= 2025 Kentucky General Assembly =

2025 session of the Kentucky General Assembly
←	2024	2026	→
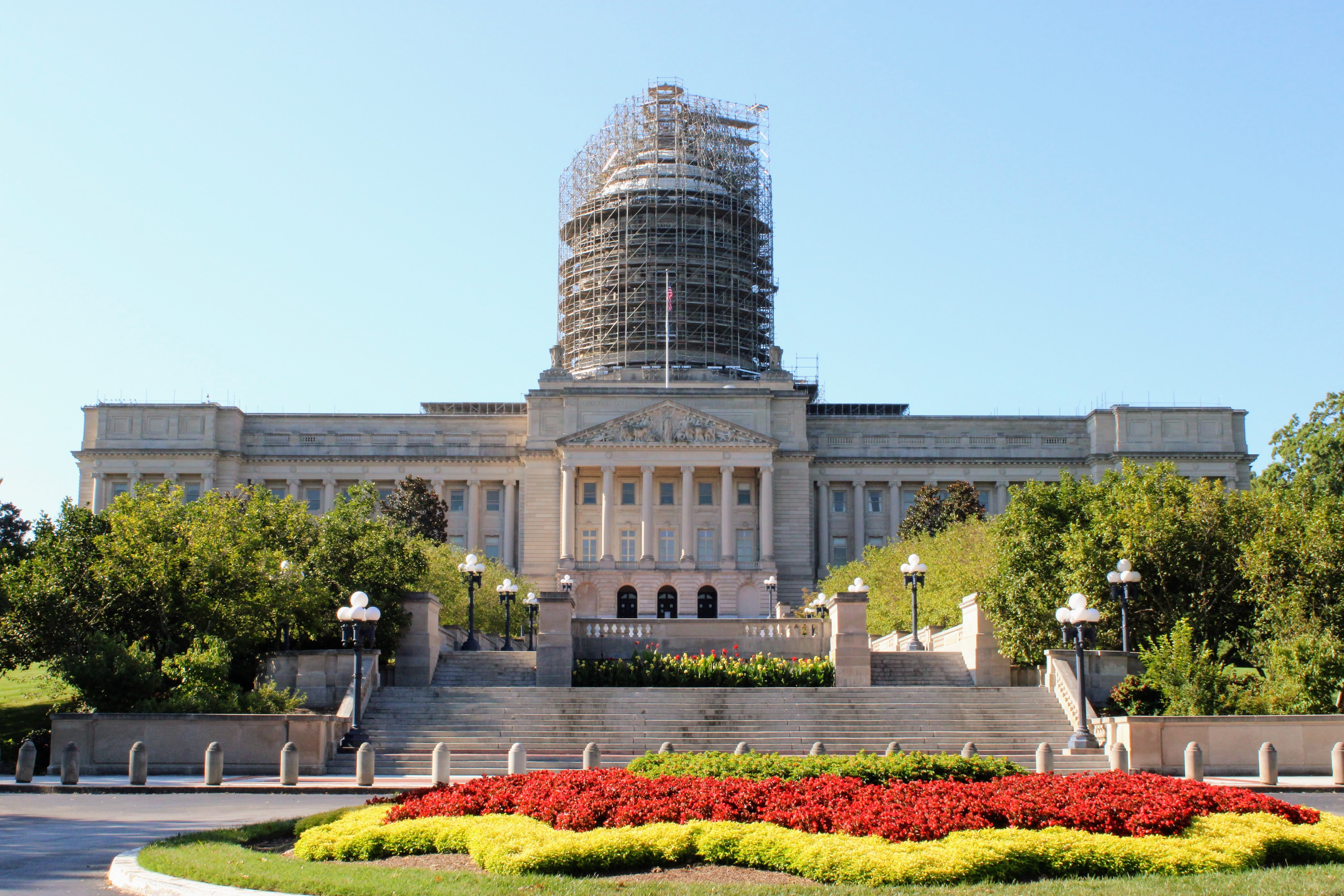
- The Kentucky State Capitol in 2023

Overview
- Legislative body: Kentucky General Assembly
- Jurisdiction: Kentucky
- Term: January 7, 2025 – March 28, 2025

Senate
- Members: 38
- President: Robert Stivers (R–25th); Jan. 8, 2013 - present
- Majority leader: Max Wise (R–16th); Jan. 7, 2025 - present
- Minority Leader: Gerald A. Neal (D–33rd); Jan. 3, 2023 - present
- Party control: Republican

House of Representatives
- Members: 100
- Speaker: David W. Osborne (R–59th); Jan. 8, 2019 - present
- Minority Leader: Pamela Stevenson (D–43rd); Jan. 7, 2025 - present
- Party control: Republican

The 2025 Kentucky General Assembly was a meeting of the Kentucky General Assembly, composed of the Kentucky Senate and the Kentucky House of Representatives. It convened in Frankfort on January 7, 2025, and adjourned sine die on March 28, 2025. It was the sixth regular session of the legislature during the tenure of governor Andy Beshear.

Republicans maintained their majorities in both chambers following the 2024 elections for the senate and the house.

== Party summary ==
=== Senate ===
Overview of Senate membership by party
	Party (shading shows control)		Total	Vacant
	Democratic	Republican	Total	Vacant
End of previous session	7	31	38	0
Begin (January 7, 2025)	7	31	38	0
Final voting share	18.4%	81.6%		
Beginning of the next session	6	32	38	0

=== House of Representatives ===
Overview of House membership by party
	Party (shading shows control)		Total	Vacant
	Democratic	Republican	Total	Vacant
End of previous session	20	80	100	0
Begin (January 7, 2025)	20	80	100	0
Final voting share	20.0%	80.0%		
Beginning of the next session	20	80	100	0

== Leadership ==
=== Senate ===
==== Presiding ====
- President: Robert Stivers (R)
- President pro tempore: David P. Givens (R)

==== Majority (Republican) ====
- Majority Leader: Max Wise
- Majority Whip: Mike Wilson
- Majority Caucus Chair: Robby Mills

==== Minority (Democratic) ====
- Minority Leader: Gerald A. Neal
- Minority Whip: David Yates
- Minority Caucus Chair: Reginald Thomas

=== House of Representatives ===
==== Presiding ====
- Speaker: David W. Osborne (R)
- Speaker pro tempore: David Meade (R)

==== Majority (Republican) ====
- Majority Leader: Steven Rudy
- Majority Whip: Jason Nemes
- Majority Caucus Chair: Suzanne Miles

==== Minority (Democratic) ====
- Minority Leader: Pamela Stevenson
- Minority Whip: Lindsey Burke
- Minority Caucus Chair: Al Gentry

== Members ==
=== Senate ===
Senators in even-numbered districts were elected in 2022, while senators in odd-numbered districts were elected in 2024.

▌1. Jason Howell (R)
▌2. Danny Carroll (R)
▌3. Craig Richardson (R)
▌4. Robby Mills (R)
▌5. Stephen Meredith (R)
▌6. Lindsey Tichenor (R)
▌7. Aaron Reed (R)
▌8. Gary Boswell (R)
▌9. David P. Givens (R)
▌10. Matthew Deneen (R)
▌11. Steve Rawlings (R)
▌12. Amanda Mays Bledsoe (R)
▌13. Reginald Thomas (D)
▌14. Jimmy Higdon (R)
▌15. Rick Girdler (R)
▌16. Max Wise (R)
▌17. Matt Nunn (R)
▌18. Robin L. Webb (D)
▌19. Cassie Chambers Armstrong (D)

▌20. Gex Williams (R)
▌21. Brandon J. Storm (R)
▌22. Donald Douglas (R)
▌23. Christian McDaniel (R)
▌24. Shelley Funke Frommeyer (R)
▌25. Robert Stivers (R)
▌26. Karen Berg (D)
▌27. Stephen West (R)
▌28. Greg Elkins (R)
▌29. Scott Madon (R)
▌30. Brandon Smith (R)
▌31. Phillip Wheeler (R)
▌32. Mike Wilson (R)
▌33. Gerald A. Neal (D)
▌34. Jared Carpenter (R)
▌35. Keturah Herron (D)
▌36. Julie Raque Adams (R)
▌37. David Yates (D)
▌38. Michael J. Nemes (R)

Senate composition by district Held by Democrats Held by Republicans

=== House of Representatives ===
All 100 house districts were last up for election in 2024.

▌1. Steven Rudy (R)
▌2. Kim Holloway (R)
▌3. Randy Bridges (R)
▌4. Wade Williams (R)
▌5. Mary Beth Imes (R)
▌6. Chris Freeland (R)
▌7. Suzanne Miles (R)
▌8. Walker Thomas (R)
▌9. Myron Dossett (R)
▌10. Josh Calloway (R)
▌11. J. T. Payne (R)
▌12. Jim Gooch Jr. (R)
▌13. DJ Johnson (R)
▌14. Scott Lewis (R)
▌15. Rebecca Raymer (R)
▌16. Jason Petrie (R)
▌17. Robert Duvall (R)
▌18. Samara Heavrin (R)
▌19. Michael Meredith (R)
▌20. Kevin Jackson (R)
▌21. Amy Neighbors (R)
▌22. Shawn McPherson (R)
▌23. Steve Riley (R)
▌24. Ryan Bivens (R)
▌25. Steve Bratcher (R)
▌26. Peyton Griffee (R)
▌27. Nancy Tate (R)
▌28. Jared Bauman (R)
▌29. Chris Lewis (R)
▌30. Daniel Grossberg (D)
▌31. Susan Witten (R)
▌32. Tina Bojanowski (D)
▌33. Jason Nemes (R)
▌34. Sarah Stalker (D)
▌35. Lisa Willner (D)
▌36. John Hodgson (R)
▌37. Emily Callaway (R)
▌38. Rachel Roarx (D)
▌39. Matt Lockett (R)
▌40. Nima Kulkarni (D)
▌41. Mary Lou Marzian (D)
▌42. Joshua Watkins (D)
▌43. Pamela Stevenson (D)
▌44. Beverly Chester-Burton (D)
▌45. Adam Moore (D)
▌46. Al Gentry (D)
▌47. Felicia Rabourn (R)
▌48. Ken Fleming (R)
▌49. Thomas Huff (R)
▌50. Candy Massaroni (R)

▌51. Michael Pollock (R)
▌52. Ken Upchurch (R)
▌53. James Tipton (R)
▌54. Daniel Elliott (R)
▌55. Kim King (R)
▌56. Daniel Fister (R)
▌57. Erika Hancock (D)
▌58. Jennifer Decker (R)
▌59. David W. Osborne (R)
▌60. Marianne Proctor (R)
▌61. Savannah Maddox (R)
▌62. Tony Hampton (R)
▌63. Kim Banta (R)
▌64. Kimberly Poore Moser (R)
▌65. Stephanie Dietz (R)
▌66. T. J. Roberts (R)
▌67. Matthew Lehman (D)
▌68. Mike Clines (R)
▌69. Steven Doan (R)
▌70. William Lawrence (R)
▌71. Josh Bray (R)
▌72. Matthew Koch (R)
▌73. Ryan Dotson (R)
▌74. David Hale (R)
▌75. Lindsey Burke (D)
▌76. Anne Donworth (D)
▌77. George Brown Jr. (D)
▌78. Mark Hart (R)
▌79. Chad Aull (D)
▌80. David Meade (R)
▌81. Deanna Frazier Gordon (R)
▌82. Nick Wilson (R)
▌83. Josh Branscum (R)
▌84. Chris Fugate (R)
▌85. Shane Baker (R)
▌86. Tom Smith (R)
▌87. Adam Bowling (R)
▌88. Vanessa Grossl (R)
▌89. Timmy Truett (R)
▌90. Derek Lewis (R)
▌91. Bill Wesley (R)
▌92. John Blanton (R)
▌93. Adrielle Camuel (D)
▌94. Mitch Whitaker (R)
▌95. Ashley Tackett Laferty (D)
▌96. Patrick Flannery (R)
▌97. Bobby McCool (R)
▌98. Aaron Thompson (R)
▌99. Richard White (R)
▌100. Scott Sharp (R)

House composition by district Held by Democrats Held by Republicans

== Changes in membership ==
=== Senate changes ===
There were no changes in Senate membership during this session.

=== House of Representatives changes ===
There were no changes in House of Representatives membership during this session.

== Committees ==
=== Senate committees ===
Committee	Chair	Vice Chair
Agriculture	Jason Howell	Gary Boswell
Appropriations and Revenue	Christian McDaniel	Amanda Mays Bledsoe
Banking and Insurance	Jared Carpenter	Rick Girdler
Committee on Committees	Robert Stivers	none
Economic Development, Tourism, and Labor	Phillip Wheeler	Shelley Funke Frommeyer
Education	Stephen West	Lindsey Tichenor
Enrollment	Matt Nunn	none
Families and Children	Danny Carroll	Amanda Mays Bledsoe
Health and Services	Stephen Meredith	Craig Richardson
Judiciary	Brandon J. Storm	Phillip Wheeler
Licensing and Occupations	Julie Raque Adams	Jason Howell
Natural Resources and Energy	Brandon Smith	Gex Williams
Rules	Robert Stivers	none
State and Local Government	Michael J. Nemes	Greg Elkins
Transportation	Jimmy Higdon	Donald Douglas
Veterans, Military Affairs, and Public Protection	Matthew Deneen	Aaron Reed

=== House of Representatives committees ===
Committee	Chair	Vice Chair(s)
Agriculture	Myron Dossett	Daniel Fister
Appropriations and Revenue	Jason Petrie	Adam Bowling and Josh Bray
Banking and Insurance	Michael Meredith	Matt Lockett and Michael Pollock
Committee on Committees	David W. Osborne	David Meade
Economic Development and Workforce Investment	Josh Branscum	Thomas Huff
Elections, Const. Amendments, and Intergovermental Affairs	DJ Johnson	John Hodgson
Enrollment	Thomas Huff	none
Families and Children	Samara Heavrin	Nick Wilson
Health Services	Kimberly Poore Moser	Robert Duvall
Judiciary	Daniel Elliott	Jennifer Decker
Licensing, Occupations, and Administrative Regulations	Matthew Koch	Tom Smith
Local Government	Patrick Flannery	Amy Neighbors
Natural Resources and Energy	Jim Gooch Jr.	Jared Bauman and Richard White
Postsecondary Education	James Tipton	Shane Baker
Primary and Secondary Education	Scott Lewis	Mike Clines
Rules	David W. Osborne	David Meade
Small Business and Information Technology	Deanna Frazier Gordon	William Lawrence
State Government	David Hale	Rebecca Raymer
Tourism and Outdoor Recreation	Kim King	Susan Witten
Transportation	John Blanton	Mary Beth Imes
Veterans, Military Affairs, and Public Protection	Bobby McCool	Bill Wesley

== See also ==
- 2024 Kentucky elections (elections leading to this session)
  - 2024 Kentucky Senate election
  - 2024 Kentucky House of Representatives election
- List of Kentucky General Assemblies
