= 2024 Kentucky General Assembly =

2024 session of the Kentucky General Assembly
←	2023	2025	→
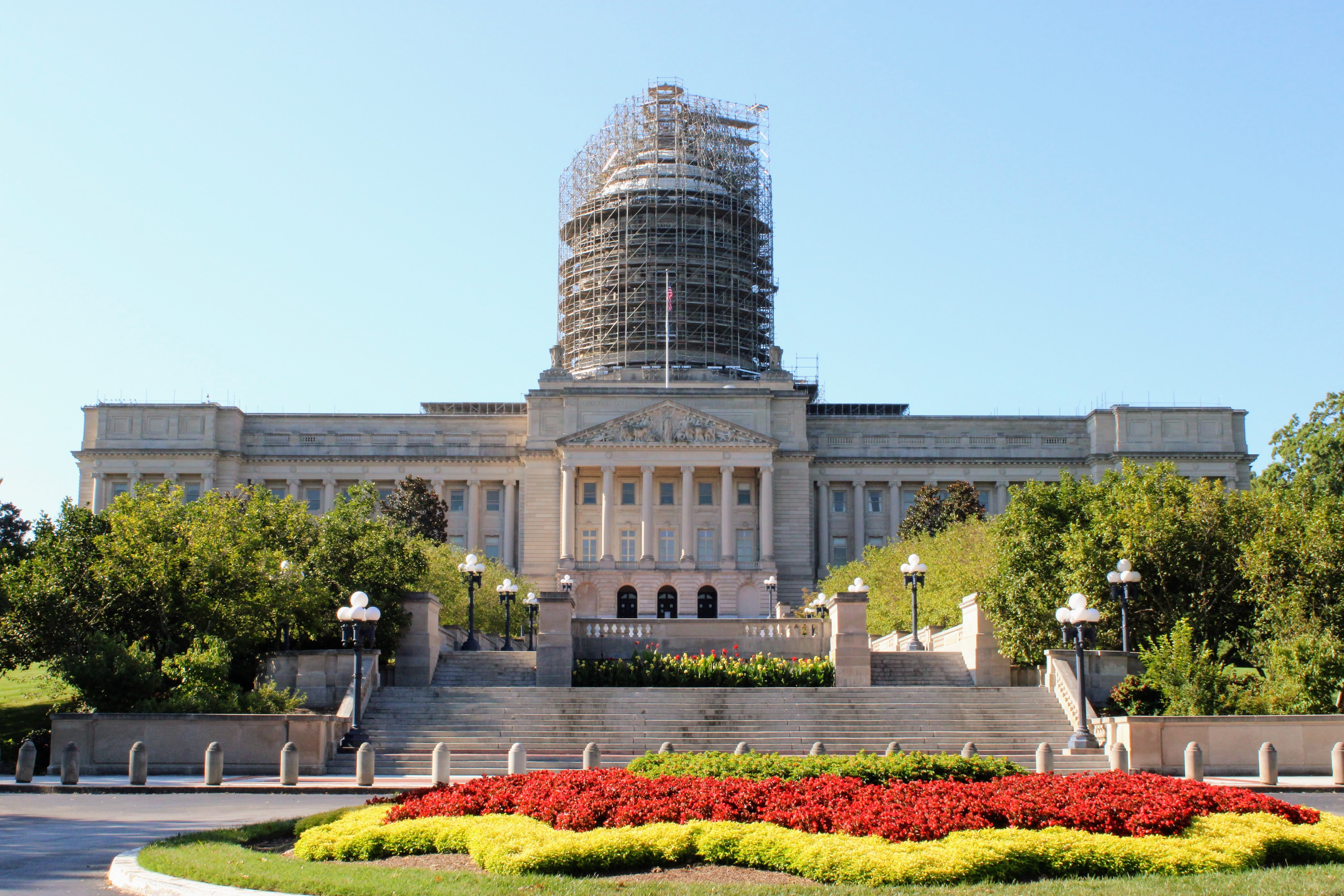
- The Kentucky State Capitol in 2023

Overview
- Legislative body: Kentucky General Assembly
- Jurisdiction: Kentucky
- Term: January 2, 2024 – April 15, 2024

Senate
- Members: 38
- President: Robert Stivers (R–25th); Jan. 8, 2013 - present
- Majority leader: Damon Thayer (R–17th); Jan. 8, 2013 - Jan. 1, 2025
- Minority Leader: Gerald Neal (D–33rd); Jan. 3, 2023 - present
- Party control: Republican

House of Representatives
- Members: 100
- Speaker: David Osborne (R–59th); Jan. 8, 2019 - present
- Minority Leader: Derrick Graham (D–57th); Jan. 3, 2023 - Jan. 1, 2025
- Party control: Republican

The 2024 Kentucky General Assembly was a meeting of the Kentucky General Assembly, composed of the Kentucky Senate and the Kentucky House of Representatives. It convened in Frankfort on January 2, 2024, and adjourned sine die on April 15, 2024. It was the fifth regular session of the legislature during the tenure of governor Andy Beshear.

Republicans maintained their majorities in both chambers following the 2022 elections for the senate and the house.

During this session, the General Assembly approved two constitutional amendments that were voted on in November 2024, including the charter schools amendment.

== Major legislation ==
=== Enacted ===
House bills

- HB 1: An act relating to government agencies, making an appropriation therefor, and declaring an emergency (passed over veto)
- HB 2: 2024 Kentucky Amendment 2: An act proposing to create a new section of the Constitution of Kentucky relating to education funding (Note: Amendments to the Constitution of Kentucky require a 3/5 majority in both houses of the legislature and a majority vote by referendum. They can not be vetoed by the governor.)
- HB 5: An act relating to crimes and punishments (passed over veto)
- HB 6: An act relating to appropriations measures providing funding and establishing conditions for the operations, maintenance, support, and functioning of the government of the Commonwealth of Kentucky and its various officers, cabinets, departments, boards, commissions, institutions, subdivisions, agencies, and other state-supported activities (passed over veto)
- HB 7: An act relating to autonomous vehicles (passed over veto)
- HB 11: An act relating to nicotine products
- HB 18: An act relating to the rights of property owners and declaring an emergency (passed over veto)
- HB 44: An act relating to voter registration (passed over veto)
- HB 53: An act relating to elections and making an appropriation therefor (without signature)
- HB 142: An act relating to products that contain nicotine
- HB 278: An act relating to the protection of children
- HB 388: An act relating to local government and declaring an emergency (passed over veto)
- HB 513: An act relating to the New State Capitol campus (passed over veto)
- HB 535: An act relating to civic education
- HB 561: An act relating to child care
- HB 611: An act relating to truancy (without signature)
- HB 622: An act relating to elections and declaring an emergency (passed over veto)
- HB 752: An act relating to disaster recovery, making an appropriation therefor, and declaring an emergency

Senate bills

- SB 2: An act relating to student safety (without signature)
- SB 20: An act relating to crimes and punishments (without signature)
- SB 143: 2024 Kentucky Amendment 1: An act proposing to amend Sections 145 and 155 of the Constitution of Kentucky relating to persons entitled to vote
- SB 198: An act relating to nuclear energy development (passed over veto)
- SB 215: An act relating to motor vehicles (without signature)

=== Passed both houses ===
Senate bills

- SB 6: An act relating to postsecondary institutions

=== Passed one house ===
House bills

- HB 96: An act relating to moments of silence and reflection
- HB 227: An act relating to school districts
- HB 255: An act relating to employment of minors
- HB 300: An act relating to the profession of education
- HB 367: An act relating to public benefits
- HB 463: An act relating to the protection of children using social media
- HB 465: An act relating to worker benefits
- HB 509: An act relating to access to the records and meetings of public agencies
- HB 575: An act relating to the acquisition of agricultural land
- HB 626: An act relating to interference with a legislative proceeding
- HB 829: An act relating to medicinal cannabis

Senate bills

- SB 3: An act relating to the Department of Agriculture and declaring an emergency
- SB 4: An act relating to sick leave for members of the Teachers' Retirement System and declaring an emergency
- SB 8: An act relating to the Kentucky Board of Education
- SB 10: An act proposing to amend Section 95 of the Constitution of Kentucky relating to the election of state officers
- SB 23: An act proposing to create a new section of the Constitution of Kentucky relating to property exempt from taxation
- SB 25: An act relating to local landlord and tenant ordinances
- SB 80: An act relating to elections
- SB 126: An act proposing to amend Sections 77 and 240 of the Constitution of Kentucky relating to limiting the Governor's ability to grant pardons and commute sentences
- SB 142: An act relating to paid parental leave
- SB 147: An act relating to adult-oriented businesses and declaring an emergency
- SB 167: An act relating to public school students' communication skills
- SB 344: An act relating to vapor products and making an appropriation therefor

=== Proposed ===
House bills

- HB 4: An act proposing to amend the Constitution of Kentucky relating to sessions of the General Assembly
- HB 9: An act relating to postsecondary education and declaring an emergency
- HB 94: An act proposing to amend Section 42 of the Constitution of Kentucky relating to sessions of the General Assembly
- HB 102: An act relating to housing opportunities
- HB 208: An act proposing an amendment to Section 183 of the Constitution of Kentucky relating to education funding
- HB 228: An act relating to postsecondary employment
- HB 259: An act relating to concealed deadly weapons
- HB 304: An act relating to education and declaring an emergency
- HB 500: An act relating to wages and hours

Senate bills

- SB 61: An act relating to elections
- SB 77: An act relating to elections
- SB 99: An act relating to exceptions to restrictions on maternal healthcare
- SB 203: An act relating to early childhood education
- SB 205: An act providing maternity leave for public school employees
- SB 300: An act relating to elections

== Major resolutions ==
=== Adopted ===
House resolutions

- HR 45: A resolution expressing support for the State of Israel and the Israeli people and condemning the violent events on October 7, 2023
- HR 57: A resolution urging Governor Andy Beshear to express support for Governor Greg Abbott and the State of Texas in their efforts to secure the border

Senate resolutions

- SR 29: A resolution honoring the life and accomplishments of former Kentucky Governor Brereton Chandler Jones
- SR 77: A resolution expressing support for the State of Israel and the Israeli people and condemning the violent events on October 7, 2023
- SR 94: A resolution honoring the 20th Black History Celebration and recognizing that Black history is American history
- SR 123: A resolution calling upon Governor Andy Beshear to support Texas Governor Greg Abbott in securing the Texas border
- SJR 140: A joint resolution directing the Public Service Commission to make all staffing, organizational, and administrative preparations necessary to be ready to discharge its regulatory duties relating to applications for the siting and construction of nuclear energy facilities in the Commonwealth
- SJR 149: A joint resolution directing the Energy and Environment Cabinet to provide guidance and consultation on best management practices for perfluoroalkyl and polyfluoroalkyl substances (PFAS) to entities that discharge directly or indirectly into Kentucky's waterways

=== Proposed ===
House resolutions

- HJR 121: A joint resolution declaring the Commonwealth of Kentucky a sanctuary state from the United States Environmental Protection Agency's overreaching regulatory actions on fossil fuel-fired power plants

Senate resolutions

- SR 50: A resolution acknowledging the events of January 6, 2021, at the United States Capitol and recognizing the citizens who have been held without due process

== Party summary ==
=== Senate ===
Overview of Senate membership by party
	Party (shading shows control)		Total	Vacant
	Democratic	Republican	Total	Vacant
End of previous session	7	30	37	1
Begin (January 2, 2024)	7	31	38	0
Final voting share	18.4%	81.6%		
Beginning of the next session	7	31	38	0

=== House of Representatives ===
Overview of House membership by party
	Party (shading shows control)		Total	Vacant
	Democratic	Republican	Total	Vacant
End of previous session	20	80	100	0
Begin (January 2, 2024) (Note: District 26: Russell Webber resigned in order to become deputy treasurer.)	20	79	99	1
January 15, 2024 (Note: District 24: Brandon Reed resigned in order to become executive director of the Kentucky Office of Agricultural Policy.)	20	78	98	2
March 25, 2024	20	80	100	0
Final voting share	20.0%	80.0%		
Beginning of the next session	20	80	100	0

== Leadership ==
=== Senate ===
==== Presiding ====
- President: Robert Stivers (R)
- President pro tempore: David P. Givens (R)

==== Majority (Republican) ====
- Majority Leader: Damon Thayer
- Majority Whip: Mike Wilson
- Majority Caucus Chair: Julie Raque Adams

==== Minority (Democratic) ====
- Minority Leader: Gerald Neal
- Minority Whip: David Yates
- Minority Caucus Chair: Reggie Thomas

=== House of Representatives ===
==== Presiding ====
- Speaker: David Osborne (R)
- Speaker pro tempore: David Meade (R)

==== Majority (Republican) ====
- Majority Leader: Steven Rudy
- Majority Whip: Jason Nemes
- Majority Caucus Chair: Suzanne Miles

==== Minority (Democratic) ====
- Minority Leader: Derrick Graham
- Minority Whip: Rachel Roberts
- Minority Caucus Chair: Cherlynn Stevenson

== Members ==
=== Senate ===
Senators in odd-numbered districts were elected in 2020, while senators in even-numbered districts were elected in 2022.

▌1. Jason Howell (R)
▌2. Danny Carroll (R)
▌3. Whitney Westerfield (R)
▌4. Robby Mills (R)
▌5. Stephen Meredith (R)
▌6. Lindsey Tichenor (R)
▌7. Adrienne Southworth (R)
▌8. Gary Boswell (R)
▌9. David P. Givens (R)
▌10. Matthew Deneen (R)
▌11. John Schickel (R)
▌12. Amanda Mays Bledsoe (R)
▌13. Reggie Thomas (D)
▌14. Jimmy Higdon (R)
▌15. Rick Girdler (R)
▌16. Max Wise (R)
▌17. Damon Thayer (R)
▌18. Robin L. Webb (D)
▌19. Cassie Chambers Armstrong (D)

▌20. Gex Williams (R)
▌21. Brandon J. Storm (R)
▌22. Donald Douglas (R)
▌23. Christian McDaniel (R)
▌24. Shelley Funke Frommeyer (R)
▌25. Robert Stivers (R)
▌26. Karen Berg (D)
▌27. Steve West (R)
▌28. Greg Elkins (R)
▌29. Johnnie Turner (R)
▌30. Brandon Smith (R)
▌31. Phillip Wheeler (R)
▌32. Mike Wilson (R)
▌33. Gerald Neal (D)
▌34. Jared Carpenter (R)
▌35. Denise Harper Angel (D)
▌36. Julie Raque Adams (R)
▌37. David Yates (D)
▌38. Michael J. Nemes (R)

Senate composition by district Held by Democrats Held by Republicans

=== House of Representatives ===
All 100 house districts were last up for election in 2022.

▌1. Steven Rudy (R)
▌2. Richard Heath (R)
▌3. Randy Bridges (R)
▌4. Wade Williams (R)
▌5. Mary Beth Imes (R)
▌6. Chris Freeland (R)
▌7. Suzanne Miles (R)
▌8. Walker Thomas (R)
▌9. Myron Dossett (R)
▌10. Josh Calloway (R)
▌11. Jonathan Dixon (R)
▌12. Jim Gooch Jr. (R)
▌13. DJ Johnson (R)
▌14. Scott Lewis (R)
▌15. Rebecca Raymer (R)
▌16. Jason Petrie (R)
▌17. Robert Duvall (R)
▌18. Samara Heavrin (R)
▌19. Michael Meredith (R)
▌20. Kevin Jackson (R)
▌21. Amy Neighbors (R)
▌22. Shawn McPherson (R)
▌23. Steve Riley (R)
▌24. Brandon Reed (R) (until January 15)

▌Courtney Gilbert (R) (from March 25)

▌25. Steve Bratcher (R)
▌26. Peyton Griffee (R) (from March 25)
▌27. Nancy Tate (R)
▌28. Jared Bauman (R)
▌29. Kevin Bratcher (R)
▌30. Daniel Grossberg (D)
▌31. Susan Tyler Witten (R)
▌32. Tina Bojanowski (D)
▌33. Jason Nemes (R)
▌34. Sarah Stalker (D)
▌35. Lisa Willner (D)
▌36. John Hodgson (R)
▌37. Emily Callaway (R)
▌38. Rachel Roarx (D)
▌39. Matt Lockett (R)
▌40. Nima Kulkarni (D)
▌41. Josie Raymond (D)
▌42. Keturah Herron (D)
▌43. Pamela Stevenson (D)
▌44. Beverly Chester-Burton (D)
▌45. Killian Timoney (R)
▌46. Al Gentry (D)
▌47. Felicia Rabourn (R)
▌48. Ken Fleming (R)
▌49. Thomas Huff (R)
▌50. Candy Massaroni (R)

▌51. Michael Pollock (R)
▌52. Ken Upchurch (R)
▌53. James Tipton (R)
▌54. Daniel Elliott (R)
▌55. Kim King (R)
▌56. Daniel Fister (R)
▌57. Derrick Graham (D)
▌58. Jennifer Decker (R)
▌59. David Osborne (R)
▌60. Marianne Proctor (R)
▌61. Savannah Maddox (R)
▌62. Phillip Pratt (R)
▌63. Kim Banta (R)
▌64. Kimberly Poore Moser (R)
▌65. Stephanie Dietz (R)
▌66. Steve Rawlings (R)
▌67. Rachel Roberts (D)
▌68. Mike Clines (R)
▌69. Steven Doan (R)
▌70. William Lawrence (R)
▌71. Josh Bray (R)
▌72. Matthew Koch (R)
▌73. Ryan Dotson (R)
▌74. David Hale (R)
▌75. Lindsey Burke (D)
▌76. Ruth Ann Palumbo (D)
▌77. George Brown Jr. (D)
▌78. Mark Hart (R)
▌79. Chad Aull (D)
▌80. David Meade (R)
▌81. Deanna Frazier (R)
▌82. Nick Wilson (R)
▌83. Josh Branscum (R)
▌84. Chris Fugate (R)
▌85. Shane Baker (R)
▌86. Tom Smith (R)
▌87. Adam Bowling (R)
▌88. Cherlynn Stevenson (D)
▌89. Timmy Truett (R)
▌90. Derek Lewis (R)
▌91. Bill Wesley (R)
▌92. John Blanton (R)
▌93. Adrielle Camuel (D)
▌94. Jacob Justice (R)
▌95. Ashley Tackett Laferty (D)
▌96. Patrick Flannery (R)
▌97. Bobby McCool (R)
▌98. Danny Bentley (R)
▌99. Richard White (R)
▌100. Scott Sharp (R)

House composition by district Held by Democrats Held by Republicans

== Changes in membership ==
=== Senate changes ===
There were no changes in Senate membership during this session.

=== House of Representatives changes ===
House changes
District	Vacated by	Reason for change	Successor	Date of successor's formal installation (Note: When seated or oath administered, not necessarily when service began.)
26	Vacant	Incumbent Russell Webber (R) resigned January 2, 2024, at the beginning of this session to become deputy treasurer in the administration of Mark Metcalf. A special election was held March 19, 2024.	Peyton Griffee (R)	March 25, 2024
24	Brandon Reed (R)	Incumbent resigned January 15, 2024, to become executive director of the Kentucky Office of Agricultural Policy. A special election was held March 19, 2024.	Courtney Gilbert (R)	March 25, 2024

== Committees ==
=== Senate committees ===
Committee	Chair	Vice Chair
Agriculture	Jason Howell	Gary Boswell
Appropriations and Revenue	Christian McDaniel	Amanda Mays Bledsoe
Banking and Insurance	Jared Carpenter	Rick Girdler
Committee on Committees	Robert Stivers	none
Economic Development, Tourism, and Labor	Max Wise	Phillip Wheeler
Education	Steve West	Gex Williams
Enrollment	Amanda Mays Bledsoe	none
Families and Children	Danny Carroll	Julie Raque Adams
Health and Services	Stephen Meredith	Donald Douglas
Judiciary	Whitney Westerfield	Phillip Wheeler
Licensing and Occupations	John Schickel	Michael J. Nemes
Natural Resources and Energy	Brandon Smith	Johnnie Turner
Rules	Robert Stivers	none
State and Local Government	Robby Mills	Michael J. Nemes
Transportation	Jimmy Higdon	Brandon J. Storm
Veterans, Military Affairs, and Public Protection	Rick Girdler	Matthew Deneen

=== House of Representatives committees ===
Committee	Chair	Vice Chair(s)
Agriculture	Richard Heath	Daniel Fister
Appropriations and Revenue	Jason Petrie	Adam Bowling and Josh Bray
Banking and Insurance	Michael Meredith	Matt Lockett and Michael Pollock
Committee on Committees	David Osborne	David Meade
Economic Development and Workforce Investment	Josh Branscum	Thomas Huff
Education	James Tipton	Shane Baker and Timmy Truett
Elections, Const. Amendments, and Intergovernmental Affairs	Kevin Bratcher	Josh Calloway
Enrollment	Thomas Huff	none
Families and Children	Samara Heavrin	Steve Riley
Health Services	Kimberly Poore Moser	Ryan Dotson
Judiciary	Daniel Elliott	Jennifer Decker
Licensing, Occupations, and Administrative Regulations	Matthew Koch	Tom Smith
Local Government	Randy Bridges	Ken Fleming
Natural Resources and Energy	Jim Gooch Jr.	Bill Wesley and Richard White
Rules	David Osborne	David Meade
Small Business and Information Technology	Phillip Pratt	William Lawrence
State Government	David Hale	Mary Beth Imes
Tourism and Outdoor Recreation	Kim King	Shawn McPherson
Transportation	John Blanton	Jonathan Dixon
Veterans, Military Affairs, and Public Protection	Walker Thomas	Scott Sharp

== See also ==
- 2022 Kentucky elections (elections leading to this session)
  - 2022 Kentucky Senate election
  - 2022 Kentucky House of Representatives election
- List of Kentucky General Assemblies
