= 2026 Kentucky General Assembly =

2026 session of the Kentucky General Assembly
| ← | 2025 | 2027 | → |
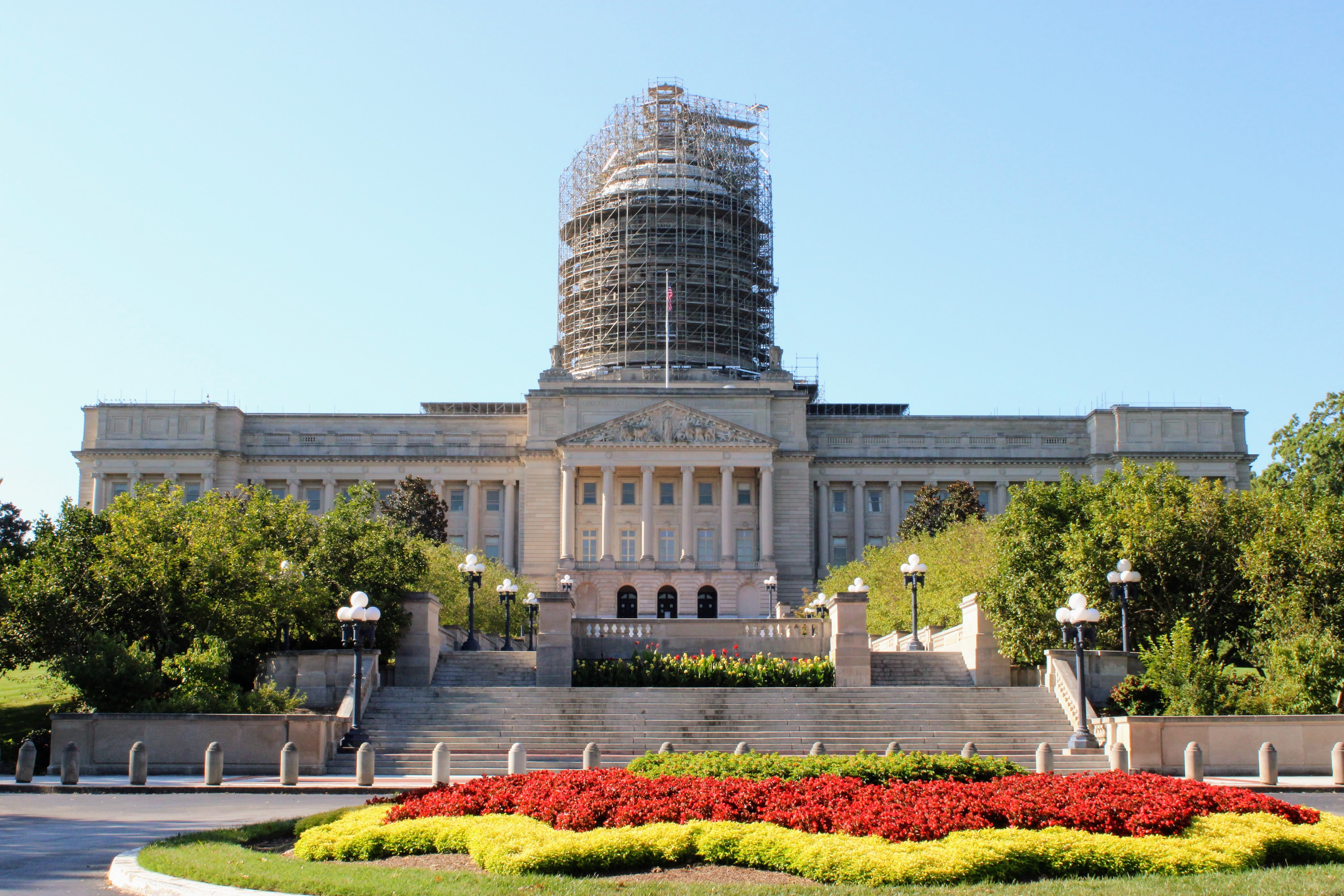
- The Kentucky State Capitol in 2023

Overview
- Legislative body: Kentucky General Assembly
- Jurisdiction: Kentucky
- Term: January 6, 2026 – April 15, 2026

Senate
- Members: 38
- President: Robert Stivers (R–25th); Jan. 8, 2013 - present
- Majority leader: Max Wise (R–16th); Jan. 7, 2025 - present
- Minority Leader: Gerald A. Neal (D–33rd); Jan. 3, 2023 - present
- Party control: Republican

House of Representatives
- Members: 100
- Speaker: David W. Osborne (R–59th); Jan. 8, 2019 - present
- Minority Leader: Pamela Stevenson (D–43rd); Jan. 7, 2025 - present
- Party control: Republican

The 2026 Kentucky General Assembly was a meeting of the Kentucky General Assembly, composed of the Kentucky Senate and the Kentucky House of Representatives. It convened in Frankfort on January 6, 2026, and adjourned sine die on April 15, 2026. It was the first regular session to be held in the General Assembly's temporary structure on the capitol grounds following the closure of the Kentucky Capitol building for long-term renovations. It was the seventh regular session of the legislature during the tenure of governor Andy Beshear.

Republicans maintained their majorities in both chambers following the 2024 elections for the senate and the house.

The impeachment of judge Julie Goodman during this session was only the second since 1991, the prior impeachment being that of commonwealth's attorney Ronnie Goldy in 2023.

== Major legislation ==
=== Enacted ===
Senate bills

- SB 10: 2026 Kentucky Amendment 1: An act proposing to amend Sections 77 and 240 of the Constitution of Kentucky relating to limiting the Governor's ability to grant pardons and commute sentences (Note: Amendments to the Constitution of Kentucky require a 3/5 majority in both houses of the legislature and a majority vote by referendum. They can not be vetoed by the governor.)

=== Passed one house ===
Senate bills

- SB 51: An act proposing to create a new section of the Constitution of Kentucky relating to property exempt from taxation
- SB 80: An act proposing an amendment to Section 145 of the Constitution of Kentucky relating to restoration of rights
- SB 262: An act proposing an amendment to Section 256 of the Constitution of Kentucky relating to the submission of constitutional amendments to voters

== Major resolutions ==
=== Adopted ===
House resolutions

- HR 124: A resolution laying before the House of Representatives Articles of Impeachment against Julie Muth Goodman, Circuit Judge for the 22nd Judicial Circuit consisting of Fayette County

== Party summary ==
=== Senate ===
Overview of Senate membership by party
| | Party (shading shows control) | | Total | Vacant |
| | Democratic | Republican | Total | Vacant |
|---|---|---|---|---|
| End of previous session | 7 | 31 | 38 | 0 |
| Begin (January 6, 2026) | 6 | 32 | 38 | 0 |
| Final voting share | 15.8% | 84.2% | | |
| Beginning of the next session | TBD | TBD | 38 | 0 |

=== House of Representatives ===
Overview of House membership by party
| | Party (shading shows control) | | Total | Vacant |
| | Democratic | Republican | Total | Vacant |
|---|---|---|---|---|
| End of previous session | 20 | 80 | 100 | 0 |
| Begin (January 6, 2026) | 20 | 80 | 100 | 0 |
| Final voting share | 20.0% | 80.0% | | |
| Beginning of the next session | TBD | TBD | 100 | 0 |

== Leadership ==
=== Senate ===
==== Presiding ====
- President: Robert Stivers (R)
- President pro tempore: David P. Givens (R)

==== Majority (Republican) ====
- Majority Leader: Max Wise
- Majority Whip: Mike Wilson
- Majority Caucus Chair: Robby Mills

==== Minority (Democratic) ====
- Minority Leader: Gerald A. Neal
- Minority Whip: Cassie Chambers Armstrong
- Minority Caucus Chair: Reginald L. Thomas

=== House of Representatives ===
==== Presiding ====
- Speaker: David W. Osborne (R)
- Speaker pro tempore: David Meade (R)

==== Majority (Republican) ====
- Majority Leader: Steven Rudy
- Majority Whip: Jason Nemes
- Majority Caucus Chair: Suzanne Miles

==== Minority (Democratic) ====
- Minority Leader: Pamela Stevenson
- Minority Whip: Joshua Watkins
- Minority Caucus Chair: Lindsey Burke

== Members ==
=== Senate ===
Senators in even-numbered districts were elected in 2022, while senators in odd-numbered districts were elected in 2024.

▌1. Jason Howell (R)
▌2. Danny Carroll (R)
▌3. Craig Richardson (R)
▌4. Robby Mills (R)
▌5. Stephen Meredith (R)
▌6. Lindsey Tichenor (R)
▌7. Aaron Reed (R)
▌8. Gary Boswell (R)
▌9. David P. Givens (R)
▌10. Matthew Deneen (R)
▌11. Steve Rawlings (R)
▌12. Amanda Mays Bledsoe (R)
▌13. Reginald L. Thomas (D)
▌14. Jimmy Higdon (R)
▌15. Rick Girdler (R)
▌16. Max Wise (R)
▌17. Matt Nunn (R)
▌18. Robin L. Webb (R)
▌19. Cassie Chambers Armstrong (D)

▌20. Gex Williams (R)
▌21. Brandon J. Storm (R)
▌22. Donald Douglas (R)
▌23. Christian McDaniel (R)
▌24. Shelley Funke Frommeyer (R)
▌25. Robert Stivers (R)
▌26. Karen Berg (D)
▌27. Stephen West (R)
▌28. Greg Elkins (R)
▌29. Scott Madon (R)
▌30. Brandon Smith (R)
▌31. Phillip Wheeler (R)
▌32. Mike Wilson (R)
▌33. Gerald A. Neal (D)
▌34. Jared Carpenter (R)
▌35. Keturah J. Herron (D)
▌36. Julie Raque Adams (R)
▌37. Gary Clemons (D)
▌38. Michael J. Nemes (R)

Senate composition by district Held by Democrats Held by Republicans

=== House of Representatives ===
All 100 house districts were last up for election in 2024.

▌1. Steven Rudy (R)
▌2. Kim Holloway (R)
▌3. Randy Bridges (R)
▌4. Wade Williams (R)
▌5. Mary Beth Imes (R)
▌6. Chris Freeland (R)
▌7. Suzanne Miles (R)
▌8. Walker Thomas (R)
▌9. Myron Dossett (R)
▌10. Josh Calloway (R)
▌11. J. T. Payne (R)
▌12. Jim Gooch Jr. (R)
▌13. DJ Johnson (R)
▌14. Scott Lewis (R)
▌15. Rebecca Raymer (R)
▌16. Jason Petrie (R)
▌17. Robert Duvall (R)
▌18. Samara Heavrin (R)
▌19. Michael Meredith (R)
▌20. Kevin Jackson (R)
▌21. Amy Neighbors (R)
▌22. Shawn McPherson (R)
▌23. Steve Riley (R)
▌24. Ryan Bivens (R)
▌25. Steve Bratcher (R)
▌26. Peyton Griffee (R)
▌27. Nancy Tate (R)
▌28. Jared Bauman (R)
▌29. Chris Lewis (R)
▌30. Daniel Grossberg (D)
▌31. Susan Witten (R)
▌32. Tina Bojanowski (D)
▌33. Jason Nemes (R)
▌34. Sarah Stalker (D)
▌35. Lisa Willner (D)
▌36. John Hodgson (R)
▌37. Emily Callaway (R)
▌38. Rachel Roarx (D)
▌39. Matt Lockett (R)
▌40. Nima Kulkarni (D)
▌41. Mary Lou Marzian (D)
▌42. Joshua Watkins (D)
▌43. Pamela Stevenson (D)
▌44. Beverly Chester-Burton (D)
▌45. Adam Moore (D)
▌46. Al Gentry (D)
▌47. Felicia Rabourn (R)
▌48. Ken Fleming (R)
▌49. Thomas Huff (R)
▌50. Candy Massaroni (R)

▌51. Michael Sarge Pollock (R)
▌52. Ken Upchurch (R)
▌53. James Tipton (R)
▌54. Daniel Elliott (R)
▌55. Kim King (R)
▌56. Daniel Fister (R)
▌57. Erika Hancock (D)
▌58. Jennifer Decker (R)
▌59. David W. Osborne (R)
▌60. Marianne Proctor (R)
▌61. Savannah Maddox (R)
▌62. Tony Hampton (R)
▌63. Kim Banta (R)
▌64. Kimberly Poore Moser (R)
▌65. Stephanie Dietz (R)
▌66. T. J. Roberts (R)
▌67. Matthew Lehman (D)
▌68. Mike Clines (R)
▌69. Steven Doan (R)
▌70. William Lawrence (R)
▌71. Josh Bray (R)
▌72. Matthew Koch (R)
▌73. Ryan Dotson (R)
▌74. David Hale (R)
▌75. Lindsey Burke (D)
▌76. Anne Gay Donworth (D)
▌77. George Brown Jr. (D)
▌78. Mark Hart (R)
▌79. Chad Aull (D)
▌80. David Meade (R)
▌81. Deanna Gordon (R)
▌82. Nick Wilson (R)
▌83. Josh Branscum (R)
▌84. Chris Fugate (R)
▌85. Shane Baker (R)
▌86. Tom Smith (R)
▌87. Adam Bowling (R)
▌88. Vanessa Grossl (R)
▌89. Timmy Truett (R)
▌90. Derek Lewis (R)
▌91. Bill Wesley (R)
▌92. John Blanton (R)
▌93. Adrielle Camuel (D)
▌94. Mitch Whitaker (R)
▌95. Ashley Tackett Laferty (D)
▌96. Patrick Flannery (R)
▌97. Bobby McCool (R)
▌98. Aaron Thompson (R)
▌99. Richard White (R)
▌100. Scott Sharp (R)

House composition by district Held by Democrats Held by Republicans

== Changes in membership ==
=== Senate changes ===
There were no changes in Senate membership during this session.

=== House of Representatives changes ===
There were no changes in House of Representatives membership during this session.

== Committees ==
=== Senate committees ===
| Committee | Chair | Vice Chair |
|---|---|---|
| Agriculture | Jason Howell | Gary Boswell |
| Appropriations and Revenue | Christian McDaniel | Amanda Mays Bledsoe |
| Banking and Insurance | Jared Carpenter | Rick Girdler |
| Committee on Committees | Robert Stivers | none |
| Economic Development, Tourism, and Labor | Phillip Wheeler | Shelley Funke Frommeyer |
| Education | Stephen West | Lindsey Tichenor |
| Enrollment | Matt Nunn | none |
| Families and Children | Danny Carroll | Amanda Mays Bledsoe |
| Health and Services | Stephen Meredith | Craig Richardson |
| Judiciary | Brandon J. Storm | Phillip Wheeler |
| Licensing and Occupations | Julie Raque Adams | Jason Howell |
| Natural Resources and Energy | Brandon Smith | Gex Williams |
| Rules | Robert Stivers | none |
| State and Local Government | Michael J. Nemes | Greg Elkins |
| Transportation | Jimmy Higdon | Donald Douglas |
| Veterans, Military Affairs, and Public Protection | Matthew Deneen | Aaron Reed |

=== House of Representatives committees ===
| Committee | Chair | Vice Chair(s) |
|---|---|---|
| Agriculture | Myron Dossett | Daniel Fister |
| Appropriations and Revenue | Jason Petrie | Adam Bowling and Josh Bray |
| Banking and Insurance | Michael Meredith | Matt Lockett and Michael Pollock |
| Committee on Committees | David W. Osborne | David Meade |
| Economic Development and Workforce Investment | Josh Branscum | Thomas Huff |
| Elections, Const. Amendments, and Intergovermental Affairs | DJ Johnson | John Hodgson |
| Enrollment | Thomas Huff | none |
| Families and Children | Samara Heavrin | Nick Wilson |
| Health Services | Kimberly Poore Moser | Robert Duvall |
| Judiciary | Daniel Elliott | Jennifer Decker |
| Licensing, Occupations, and Administrative Regulations | Matthew Koch | Tom Smith |
| Local Government | Patrick Flannery | Amy Neighbors |
| Natural Resources and Energy | Jim Gooch Jr. | Jared Bauman and Richard White |
| Postsecondary Education | James Tipton | Shane Baker |
| Primary and Secondary Education | Scott Lewis | Mike Clines |
| Rules | David W. Osborne | David Meade |
| Small Business and Information Technology | Deanna Frazier Gordon | William Lawrence |
| State Government | David Hale | Rebecca Raymer |
| Tourism and Outdoor Recreation | Kim King | Susan Witten |
| Transportation | John Blanton | Mary Beth Imes |
| Veterans, Military Affairs, and Public Protection | Bobby McCool | Bill Wesley |

== See also ==
- 2024 Kentucky elections (elections leading to this session)
  - 2024 Kentucky Senate election
  - 2024 Kentucky House of Representatives election
- List of Kentucky General Assemblies
