= 2026 Kentucky Amendment 1 =

Amendment 1
- November 3, 2026
- Gubernatorial pardons amendment

Results
Choice	Votes	%
Yes	896,220	70.69%
No	371,660	29.31%
Valid votes	1,267,880	100.00%
Invalid or blank votes	0	0.00%
Total votes	1,267,880	100.00%
- County results Yes: 60–70% 70–80% 80–90%

2026 Kentucky Amendment 1 was a legislatively referred amendment to the Kentucky Constitution, which was voted on as part of the 2026 Kentucky elections. It was approved with 71 percent of the vote. The amendment will prohibit the governor of Kentucky from granting pardons or commutations from 60 days before a gubernatorial election until the start of the next gubernatorial term.

== Text ==
Are you in favor of limiting a Governor's ability to grant pardons or commute sentences by prohibiting him or her from granting pardons or commuting sentences during the time period beginning 60 days prior to the general election at which the Governor is elected, and ending when the Governor is sworn in for that term by amending the Constitution of Kentucky as stated below?

IT IS PROPOSED THAT SECTION 77 OF THE CONSTITUTION OF KENTUCKY BE AMENDED TO READ AS FOLLOWS:

1. The Governor shall have power to:

a. Remit fines and forfeitures; and
b. Commute sentences and grant reprieves and pardons, except:

i. In case of impeachment; or
ii. For the period beginning sixty days prior to the date of the gubernatorial election and ending the fifth Tuesday succeeding the election.

2. The Governor shall file with each application therefor a statement of the reasons for his or her decision thereon, which application and statement shall always be open to public inspection.
3. In cases of treason, the Governor shall have power to grant reprieves until the end of the next session of the General Assembly, in which the power of pardoning shall be vested; but he or she shall have no power to remit the fees of the Clerk, Sheriff or Commonwealth's Attorney in penal or criminal cases.

== Legislative history ==
Amendments to the Kentucky Constitution require 3/5 support in both houses of the General Assembly and a majority vote by referendum; they can not be vetoed by the governor. The amendment was first introduced on January 8 in the 2026 General Assembly as Senate Bill 10 by senator Christian McDaniel. The bill passed both houses and will be voted on in November 2026.

== Results ==
Amendment 1
Choice	Votes	%
For	896,220	70.69
Against	371,660	29.31
Total	1,267,880	100.00

== See also ==
- 2026 Kentucky elections
- 2026 United States ballot measures
- Governor of Kentucky
