= Cluster Howard =

American politician

Member of the Kentucky House of Representatives from the 91st district
- In office January 1, 2019 – January 1, 2021
- Preceded by: Toby Herald
- Succeeded by: Bill Wesley
- In office January 1, 2015 – January 1, 2017
- Preceded by: Toby Herald
- Succeeded by: Toby Herald

Personal details
- Born: Cluster Howard; September 13, 1956 (age 69) Southfork, Kentucky
- Party: Democratic
- Spouse: Sandra Tapley Howard
- Children: 2
- Education: Lees College (AA); Berea College (BA); Morehead State University (MA)

Cluster Howard (born September 13, 1956) is an American politician from Kentucky who was a member of the Kentucky House of Representatives from 2015 to 2017 and 2019 to 2021. Howard was first elected in 2014, defeating Republican incumbent Toby Herald. In 2016 he was defeated by 1500 votes for reelection by Herald in a rematch. Howard challenged Herald again in 2018, defeating him by a margin of seven votes. Howard declined to seek reelection in 2020 and was succeeded by Republican Bill Wesley.
