= Felicia Rabourn =

American politician (born 1990)

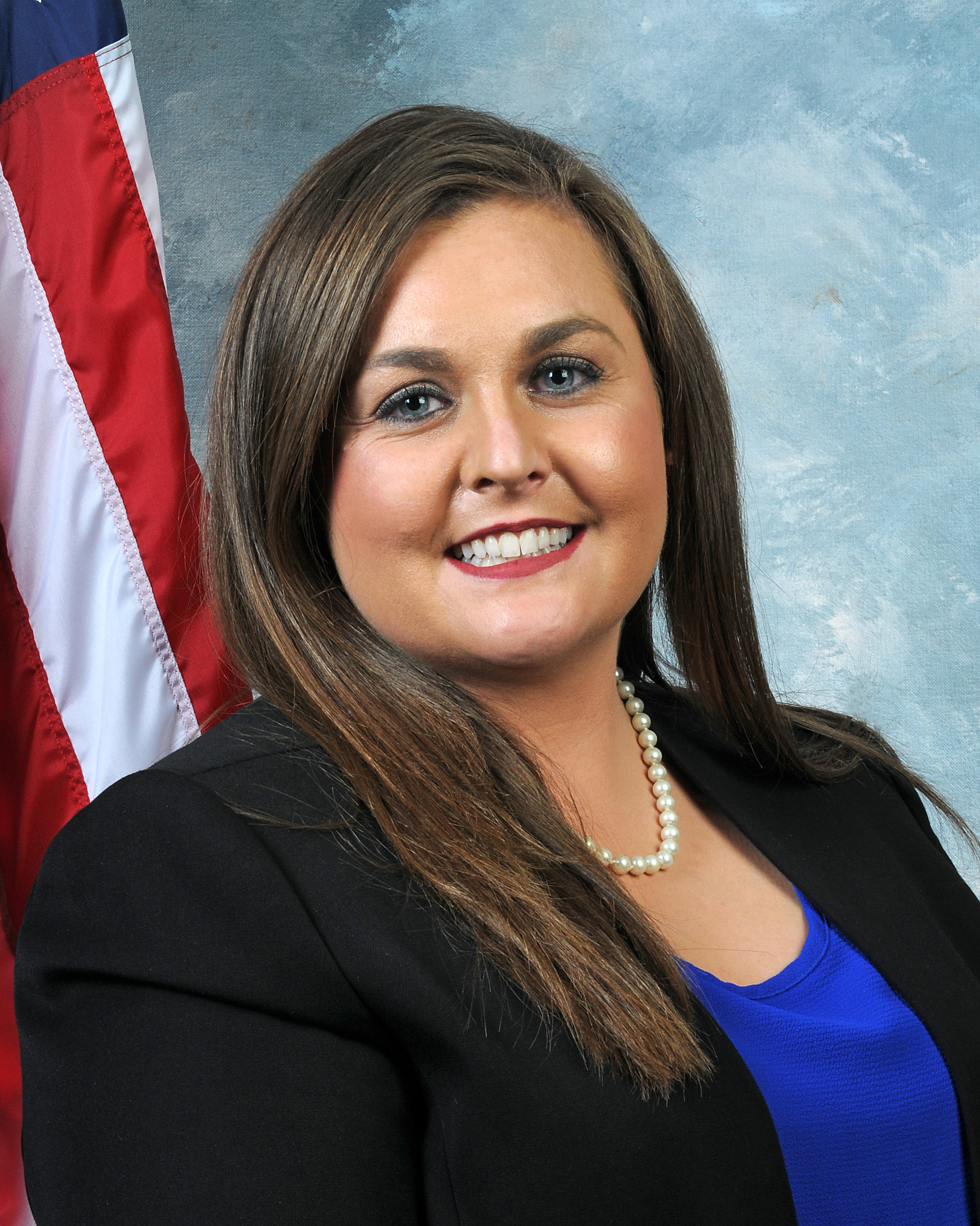

Member of the Kentucky House of Representatives from the 47th district
- Incumbent
- Assumed office January 1, 2021
- Preceded by: Rick Rand

Personal details
- Born: December 22, 1990 (age 35) Henry County, Kentucky
- Party: Republican
- Committees: Agriculture; Primary and Secondary Education; Families & Children; Health Services

Felicia Marie Rabourn (born December 22, 1990) is an American politician and Republican member of the Kentucky House of Representatives from Kentucky's 47th House district since January 2021. Her district includes Carroll, Henry, Owen, and Trimble counties.

== Background ==
Felicia Rabourn was born on December 22, 1990, in Henry County, Kentucky, and graduated from Henry County High School. She is currently employed as a branch officer administrator for Edward Jones Investments, and serves as the youth chair for the Henry County Republican Party.

== Political career ==
=== 2023 General Assembly ===
On March 30, 2023, the last day of the 2023 Kentucky General Assembly, Rabourn as well as Josh Calloway, Steven Doan, Mark Hart, and Nancy Tate were removed from multiple committee assignments by the House Committee on Committees. Rabourn accused house majority leadership of "retaliating" against her and other members due to her appeal of a ruling made by House Speaker David Osborne regarding a floor amendment made by Calloway.

Among those that spoke out against this decision were U.S. Representative Thomas Massie and fellow Kentucky House member Savannah Maddox.

During the 2023 Kentucky legislative interim, Rabourn along with eight other Kentucky House members sent a letter to House majority leadership requesting a number of changes be made to the House rules when they returned in January including the slowing down of last-minute bills and removing the ability of House leadership to strip members of committee assignments.

=== 2024 General Assembly ===
On January 2, the first day of the 2024 Kentucky General Assembly, Rabourn filed fifteen resolutions to make various amendments to the House rules. Most of these resolutions were aimed at decentralizing the authority of house leadership such as allowing committee members to internally elect their own chairs. None of these resolutions made it to the floor for a vote, and the motion to table the resolutions for further amending was supported by all House democrats as well as five republican members, including Rabourn.

On January 8, Rabourn and other members who were stripped to their committee assignments during the 2023 Kentucky General Assembly had their assignments either restored or were granted new assignments. Rabourn stated that, "I think that it shows leadership’s commitment of moving Kentucky in the right direction." Rabourn also noted that talks about future rule amendments would likely continue into the 2024 legislative interim and be brought up again when the 2025 Kentucky General Assembly returned in January.

=== 2025 General Assembly ===
On January 7, the House rules for the session were adopted following objections by member of the Democratic caucus. No republican members, including Rabourn, voted against the resolution.

=== Elections ===
- 2020 Incumbent Democratic representative Rick Rand chose not to seek reelection for Kentucky's 47th House district. Rabourn won the 2020 Republican primary with 1,748 votes (51.1%) and won the 2020 Kentucky House of Representatives election with 13,953 votes (69.4%) against Democratic candidate Jack Couch. She assumed office on January 1, 2021.
- 2022 Rabourn was unopposed in the 2022 Republican primary and won the 2022 Kentucky House of Representatives election with 11,387 (71.8%) against Democratic candidate Kimberly Hinkle Browning.
- 2024 Rabourn won the 2024 Republican primary with 2,029 votes (57.2%) against challenger Mark Gilkison and won the 2024 Kentucky House of Representatives election with 14,703 votes (68.2%) against Democratic candidate Robb Adams.
