= Patrick Flannery (politician) =

American politician

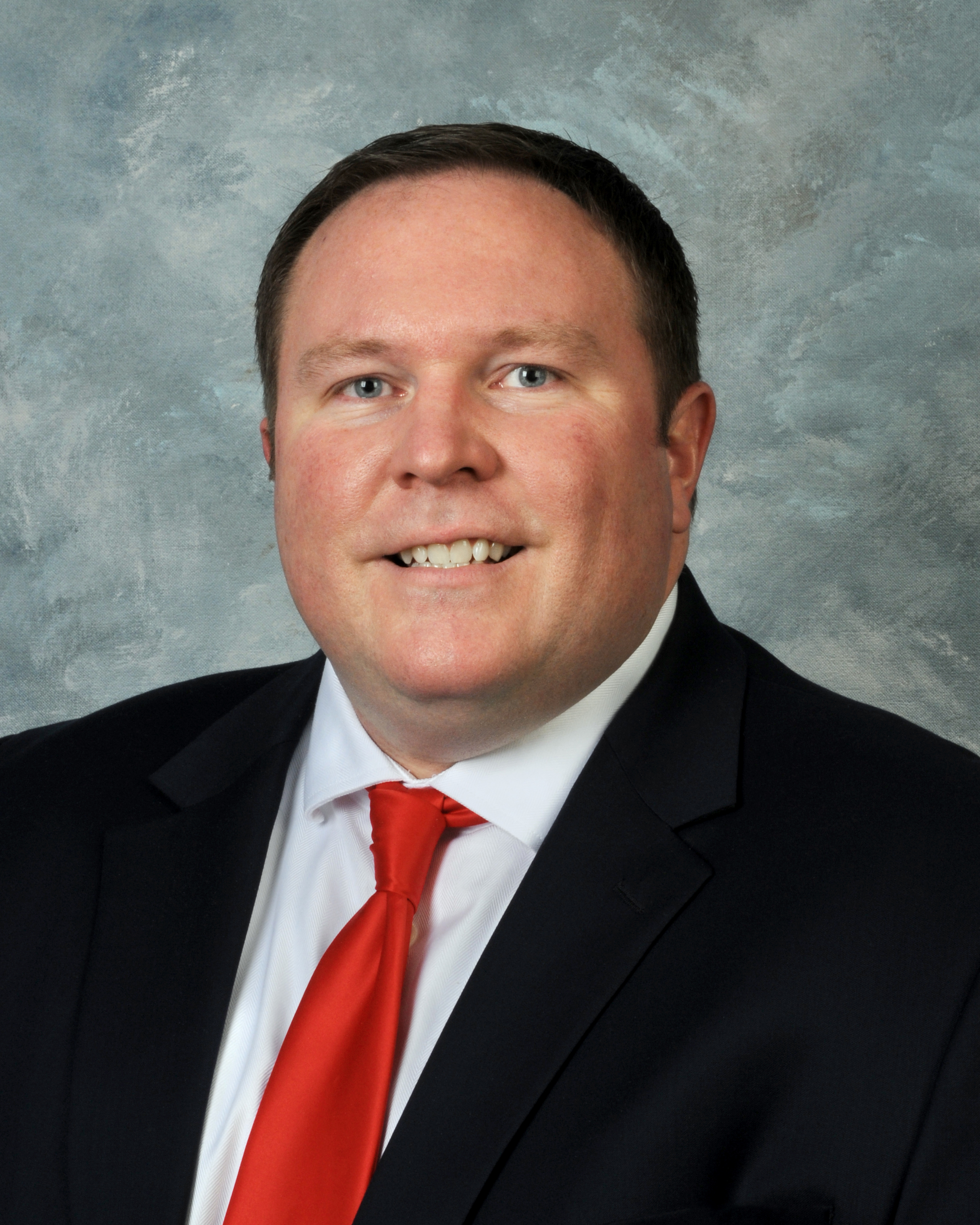

Member of the Kentucky House of Representatives from the 96th district
- Incumbent
- Assumed office January 1, 2021
- Preceded by: Kathy Hinkle

Personal details
- Party: Republican
- Children: 2
- Occupation: Attorney
- Committees: Local Government (Chair); Licensing, Occupations, & Administrative Regulations; Natural Resources & Energy; Judiciary

Patrick Clay Flannery (born December 29, 1980) is an American politician who has served as a Republican member of the Kentucky House of Representatives from Kentucky's 96th House district since January 2021. His district includes Carter and Lewis counties as well as part of Boyd County.

== Background ==
Flannery was born in Carter County, Kentucky, and graduated from West Carter High School in 1999. He would go on to play NAIA college football at Georgetown College while studying communications and political science. After graduating from Georgetown in 2003, Flannery would earn his Juris Doctor from Northern Kentucky University's Salmon P. Chase College of Law in 2008.

After returning home, Flannery opened his own private law practice and was elected Carter County Attorney in 2010. He has also served in various roles involving tax law including executive director of the Kentucky Board of Tax Appeals and deputy director of the Kentucky Claims Commission under the leadership of Governor Matthew G. Bevin and Secretary David Dickerson.

== Cancer diagnosis ==
In January 2022, Flannery was diagnosed with stage 3 testicular cancer. Since his recovery, Flannery has been outspoken advocate for testicular cancer awareness. During the 2023 Kentucky General Assembly, Flannery was the primary sponsor of HB 170, which required health insurance companies to cover reproductive preservation in cases of testicular or other urological cancers. HB 170 was passed in both chambers unanimously and signed into law by Governor Andy Beshear on March 20, 2023.

Flannery has also promised to introduce a resolution every year recognizing April as Testicular Cancer Awareness Month, which he did in both the 2023 and 2024 Kentucky General Assemblies.

== Political career ==
- 2010 Flannery won the 2010 Carter County Attorney election with 4,379 votes (51.4%) against Democratic candidate Robert W. Miller.
- 2014 Flannery was defeated for re-election as Carter County Attorney in the 2014 general election, receiving 3,576 votes (42%) with Democratic candidate Brian Bayes garnering 5,010 votes (58%).
- 2020 Flannery won the 2020 Republican primary with 2,518 votes (56.8%) and won the 2020 Kentucky House of Representatives election with 12,592 votes (68.6%) against Kentucky's 96th House district Democratic incumbent Kathy Hinkle.
- 2022 Flannery was unopposed in both the 2022 Republican primary and 2022 Kentucky House of Representatives election, winning the latter with 11,282 votes.
- 2024 Flannery was unopposed in both the 2024 Republican primary and the 2024 Kentucky House of Representatives election, winning the latter with 16,465 votes.
