= John Blanton =

American politician

Member of the Kentucky House of Representatives from the 92nd district
- Incumbent
- Assumed office January 1, 2017
- Preceded by: John Short

Personal details
- Born: May 8, 1968 (age 58)
- Party: Republican
- Children: 2
- Education: Morehead State University (BUS)
- Committees: Transportation (Chair); Judiciary; Natural Resources & Energy; Veterans, Military Affairs, & Public Protection

John Clifford Blanton (born May 8, 1968) is an American politician who has served as a Republican member of the Kentucky House of Representatives from Kentucky's 92nd House district since January 2017. His district includes Knott and Magoffin counties as well as part of Pike County.

== Background ==
In 1990, he joined the Kentucky State Police and served as a state trooper in Pikeville specializing in drug enforcement and special investigations. Throughout his career, Blanton also served the cities of Madisonville, Henderson, Morehead, and Frankfort. In 2012, he retired from the KSP as a major.

Following retirement, Blanton returned to school and graduated from Morehead State University with a Bachelor of University Studies and a concentration in criminology.

Blanton identifies as a Baptist, and serves as a pastor for multiple churches.

== Political career ==
In the 2026 Kentucky General Assembly, Blanton was appointed one of five managers in the impeachment trial of judge Julie Goodman.

=== Elections ===
- 2016 Blanton was unopposed in the 2016 Republican primary and won the 2016 Kentucky House of Representatives election with 7,745 votes (51.5%) against Kentucky's 92nd House district Democratic incumbent John Short.
- 2018 Blanton was unopposed in the 2018 Republican primary and won the 2018 Kentucky House of Representatives election with 8,120 votes (57.2%) against Democratic candidate Ryan Mosley.
- 2020 Blanton was unopposed in the 2020 Republican primary and won the 2020 Kentucky House of Representatives election with 11,447 votes (71.6%) against Democratic candidate Ancel Smith.
- 2022 Blanton was unopposed in both the 2022 Republican primary and the 2022 Kentucky House of Representatives election, winning the latter with 11,179 votes.
- 2024 Blanton was unopposed in both the 2024 Republican primary and the 2024 Kentucky House of Representatives election, winning the latter with 14,751 votes.
