= Josh Branscum =

American politician

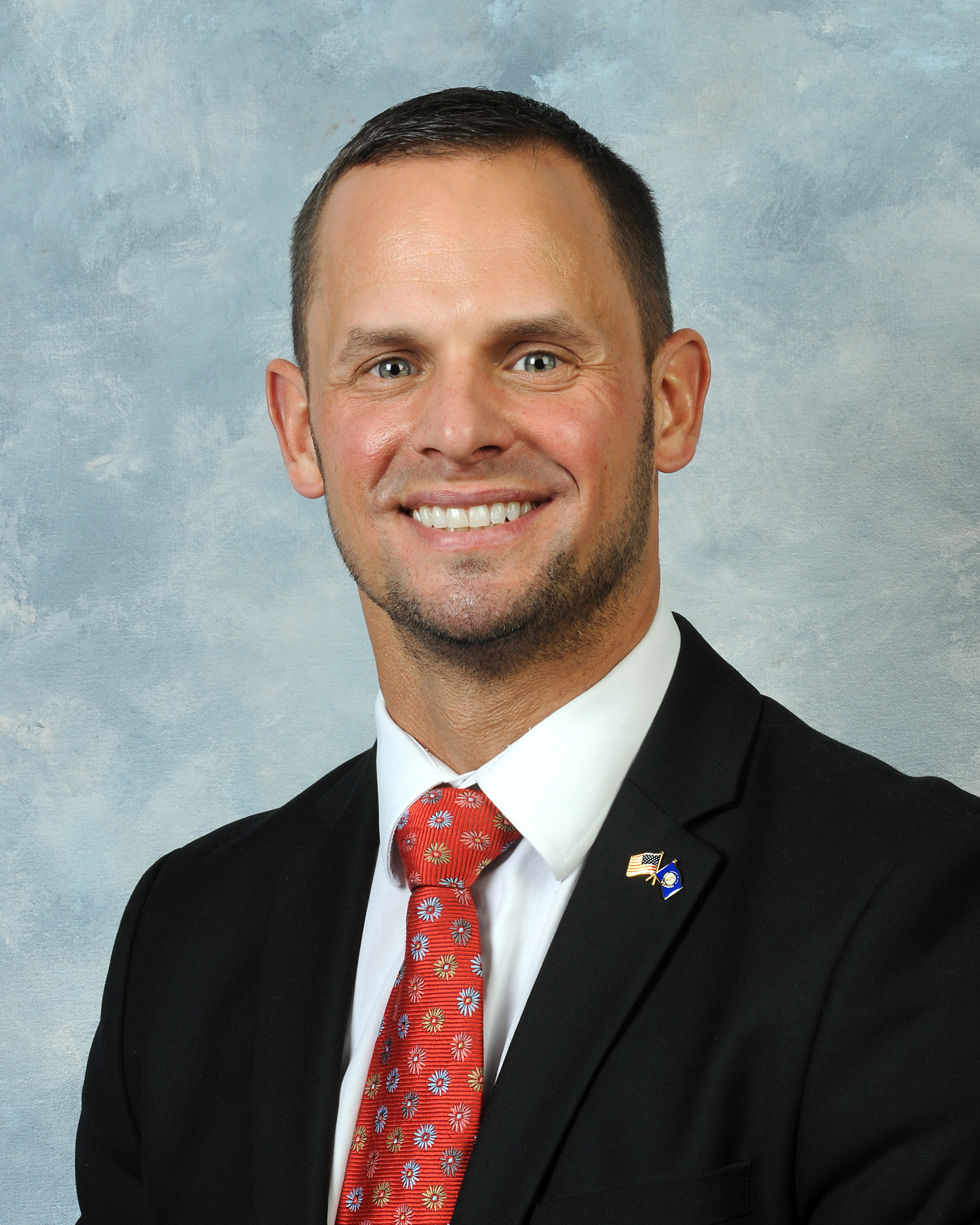

Member of the Kentucky House of Representatives from the 83rd district
- Incumbent
- Assumed office January 1, 2021
- Preceded by: Jeff Hoover

Personal details
- Born: June 13, 1982 (age 44) Russell Springs, Kentucky, U.S.
- Party: Republican
- Education: Georgetown College (BA); Eastern Kentucky University (BS)
- Committees: Economic Development & Workforce Investment (Chair); Elections, Const. Amendments & Intergovernmental Affairs; Transportation

Josh Branscum (born June 13, 1982) is an American politician and a Republican member of the Kentucky House of Representatives from Kentucky's 83rd House district. His district includes Clinton and Russell counties, as well as part of Pulaski County.

== Background ==
Branscum was born and raised in Russell Springs, Kentucky. He earned a Bachelor of Arts degree in organizational communication from Georgetown College and a Bachelor of Science in construction management from Eastern Kentucky University.

Following graduation, Branscum was employed by Branscum Construction, a company founded by his father and grandfather. He has since worked his way up the company, eventually serving as Executive Vice President before succeeding his father as president.

== Political career ==
=== Elections ===
- 2020 Kentucky's 83rd House district incumbent and former speaker, Jeff Hoover, chose not to seek reelection. Branscum won the 2020 Republican primary with 5,510 votes (56.8%) and was unopposed in the 2020 Kentucky House of Representatives election, winning with 19,498 votes.
- 2022 Branscum was unopposed in both the 2022 Republican primary and the 2022 Kentucky House of Representatives election, winning the latter with 13,055 votes.
- 2024 Branscum was unopposed in both the 2024 Republican primary and the 2024 Kentucky House of Representatives election, winning the latter with 18,293 votes.
