= James Tipton =

American politician

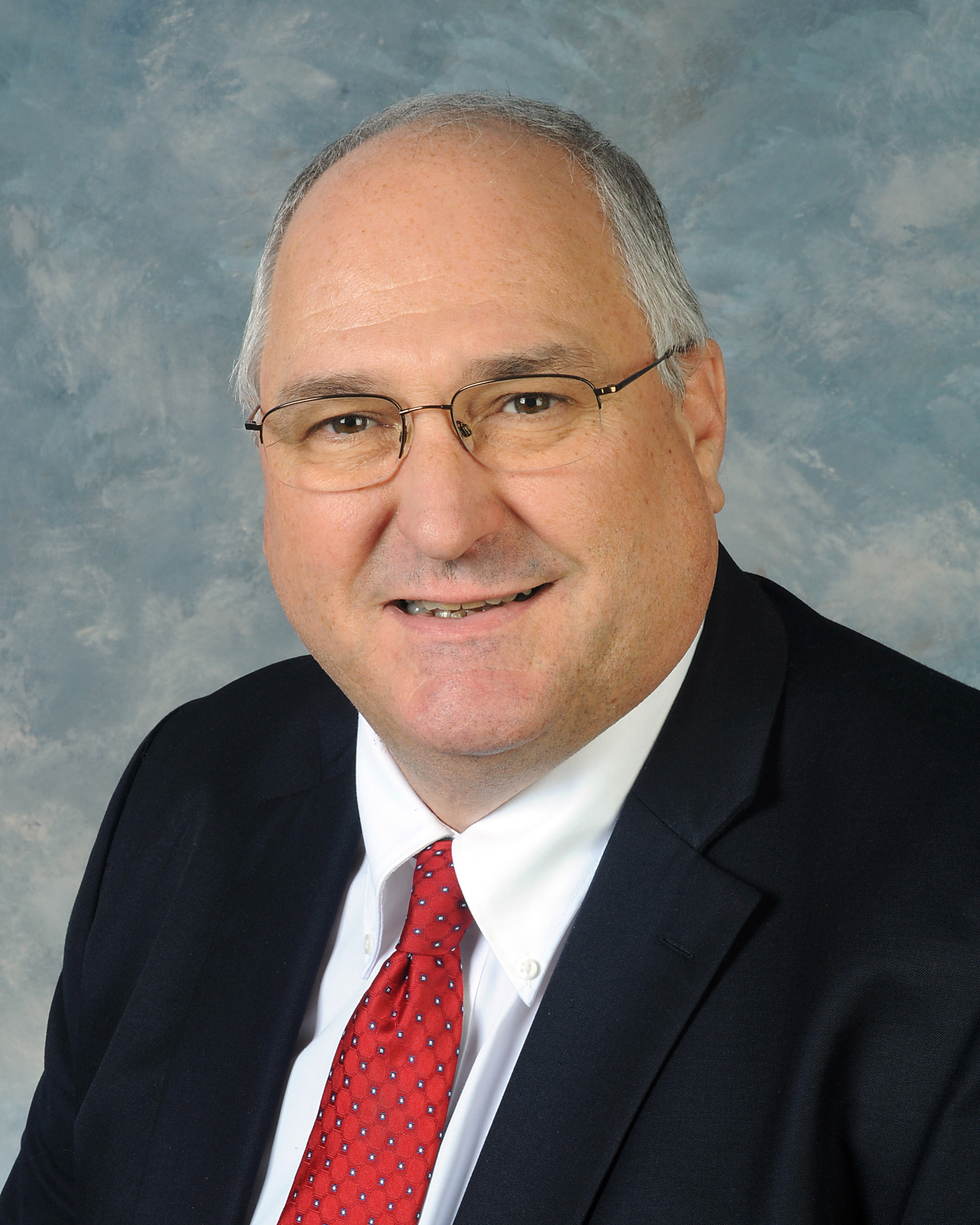

Member of the Kentucky House of Representatives from the 53rd district
- Incumbent
- Assumed office January 1, 2015
- Preceded by: Bart Rowland (redistricting)

Personal details
- Born: December 7, 1959 (age 66) Little Mount, Spencer County, Kentucky
- Party: Republican
- Education: University of Kentucky (BS, MS)
- Profession: Realtor
- Committees: Postsecondary Education (Chair); Agriculture; Primary & Secondary Education; State Government

James Allen Tipton (born December 7, 1959) is an American politician and Republican member of the Kentucky House of Representatives from Kentucky's 53rd House district since January 2015. His district consists of Anderson and Spencer counties. He currently serves as chair of the House Standing Committee on Postsecondary Education.

== Background ==
Tipton is a native of Spencer County, Kentucky, and graduated from Taylorsville High School in 1977. He would go on to attend the University of Kentucky, earning a Bachelor of Science in agriculture in 1981 and a Master of Science in vocational education in 1985.

Outside of politics, Tipton has been employed as a realtor for 25 years and is currently the principal broker for Premier Realtor LLC. He is a member of the Kentucky Association of Realtors, Kentucky Cattleman's Association, Spencer County Farm Bureau, Anderson County Chamber of Commerce, Spencer County Chamber of Commerce, and the Louisville Area Agricultural Club.

== Political career ==
=== Elections ===
- 2014 Incumbent representative Bart Rowland was redistricted into Kentucky's 23rd House district. Tipton was unopposed in the 2014 Republican primary and won the 2014 Kentucky House of Representatives election with 9,836 votes (57.4%) against Democratic candidate Kent Stevens.
- 2016 Tipton was unopposed in the 2016 Republican primary and won the 2016 Kentucky House of Representatives election with 16,091 votes (72.4%) against Democratic candidate James Sargent.
- 2018 Tipton was unopposed in the 2018 Republican primary and won the 2018 Kentucky House of Representatives election with 13,813 votes (71.1%) against Democratic candidate Dustin Burley.
- 2020 Tipton was unopposed in the 2020 Republican primary and won the 2020 Kentucky House of Representatives election with 20,087 votes (76.6%) against Democratic candidate Dustin Burley.
- 2022 Tipton was unopposed in the 2022 Republican primary and won the 2022 Kentucky House of Representatives election with 12,995 votes (76.7%) against Democratic candidate Dustin Burley.
- 2024 Tipton was unopposed in both the 2024 Republican primary and the 2024 Kentucky House of Representatives election, winning the latter with 20,101 votes.
