= Jason Howell =

American politician

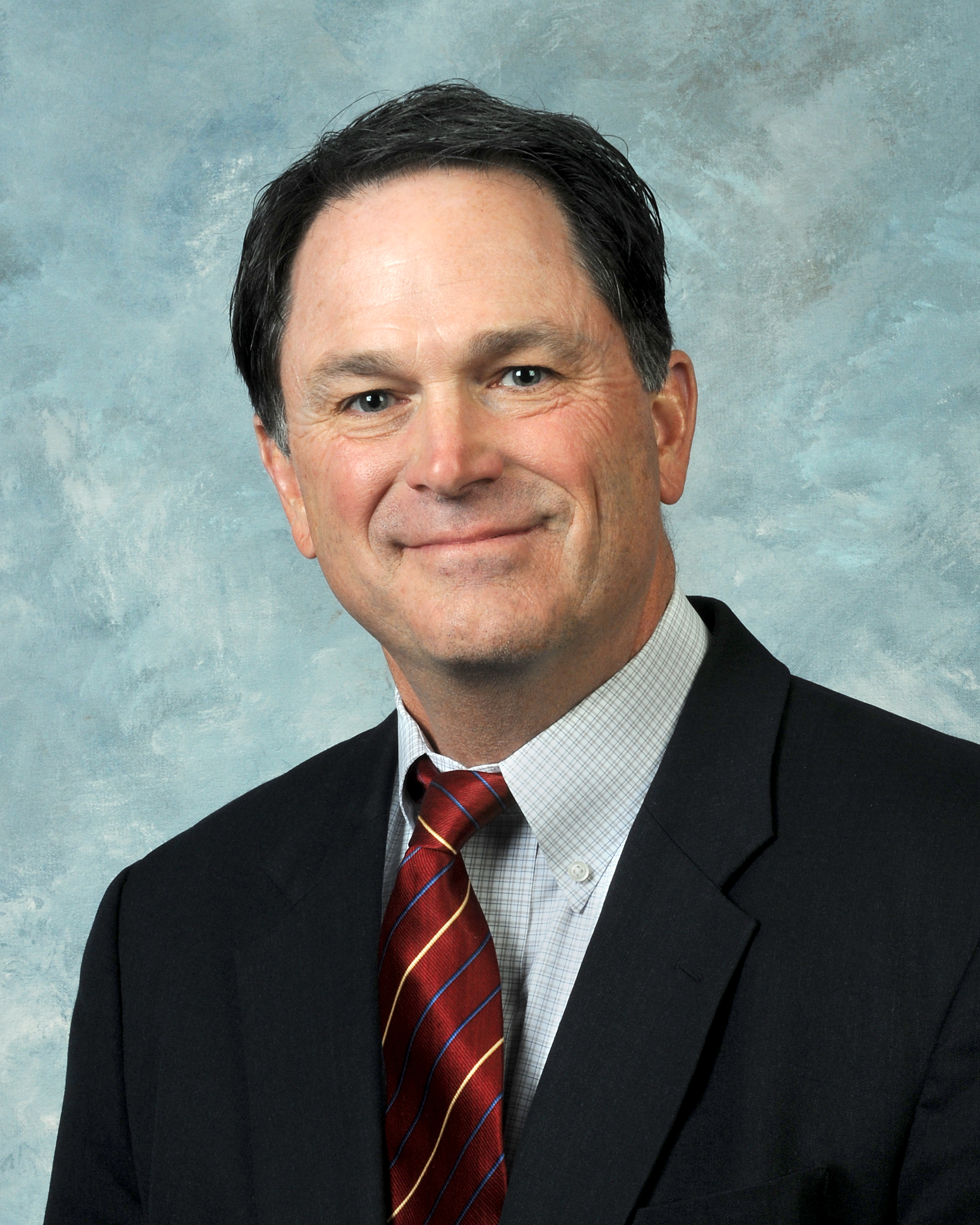
- Official portrait, 2020

Member of the Kentucky Senate from the 1st district
- Incumbent
- Assumed office January 1, 2021
- Preceded by: Stanley H. Humphries

Personal details
- Born: December 19, 1970 (age 55)
- Party: Republican
- Spouse: Renee
- Education: University of Kentucky College of Law (JD); The University of the South (BA)

Jason Glenn Howell (born December 19, 1970) is an American politician and a Republican member of the Kentucky Senate representing District 1.

== Biography ==
Howell was born in Fulton, Kentucky. He earned his JD from the University of Kentucky College of Law, and his BA from The University of the South. He is married to Renee and they have three children. Howell worked as an attorney before entering politics.

In December 2019, Howell announced that he would be a candidate for the Kentucky Senate in Kentucky's 1st Senate district in 2020. Incumbent Senator Stanley H. Humphries had announced that he would not be seeking re-election. The Republican primary for the seat was cancelled due to Howell being the only candidate.

He was elected unopposed in the November 3, 2020 general election. He was sworn into office on January 1, 2021.

== Electoral history ==
Kentucky Senate, District 1 General Election, 2020
| Party | Candidate | Votes | % |
|---|---|---|---|
| Republican | Jason Howell | 40,128 | 100.0 |
| Total votes | | 40,128 | 100.0 |

Kentucky Senate
| Preceded by Stanley H. Humphries | Member of the Kentucky Senate from the 1st district 2021–present | Incumbent |
