= Steven Doan =

American politician

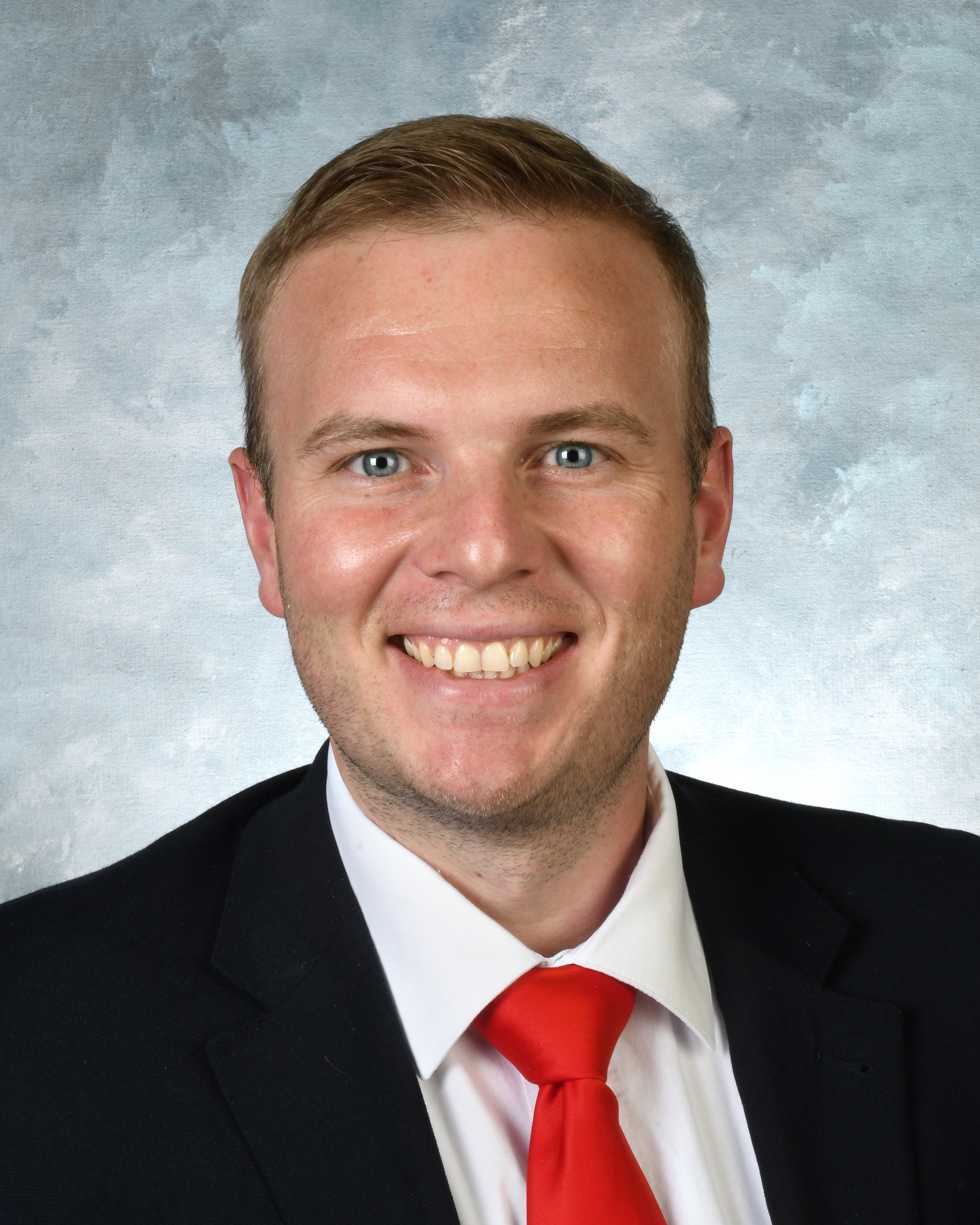

Member of the Kentucky House of Representatives from the 69th district
- Incumbent
- Assumed office January 1, 2023
- Preceded by: Adam Koenig

Personal details
- Born: October 14, 1986 (age 39) Erlanger, Kentucky
- Education: Northern Kentucky University (BS, JD)
- Occupation: Attorney
- Committees: Families and Children; Local Government; Postsecondary Education; Primary & Secondary Education

Steven Douglas Doan (born October 14, 1986) is an American attorney and politician serving as a member in the Kentucky House of Representatives from the 69th district. Elected in November 2022, he assumed office on January 1, 2023. His district comprises parts of Boone and Kenton counties.

== Background ==
Doan was raised in Erlanger, Kentucky, and attended Lloyd Memorial High School before earning a Bachelor of Science in economics and business administration from Northern Kentucky University in 2009. He went on to earn a Juris Doctor from Northern's Salmon P. Chase College of Law in 2012.

During the administration of Governor Matt Bevin, Doan was employed as general counsel for the Governor's Office of Agricultural Policy where he oversaw grant and revolving loan funds in excess of $80 million.

== Political career ==
=== Erlanger City Council ===
Following the death of long time Erlanger City Council member Kathy Cahill, Doan applied for and was subsequently appointed to fill the remainder of her unexpired term on August 9, 2021. Instead of seeking reelection to the council seat, Doan chose to challenge incumbent representative Adam Koenig in the 2022 Republican primary for Kentucky's 69th House district.

=== House of Representatives ===
In the 2026 Kentucky General Assembly, Doan was appointed one of five managers in the impeachment trial of judge Julie Goodman.

=== Elections ===
- 2022 Doan won the 2022 Republican primary with 1,369 votes (53.7%) against incumbent representative Adam Koenig and won the 2022 Kentucky House of Representatives election with 6,320 votes (60%) against Democratic candidate Chris Brown.
- 2024 Doan won the 2024 Republican primary with 1,675 votes (75.8%) and won the 2024 Kentucky House of Representatives election with 10,814 votes (62.2%) against Democratic candidate Wilanee Stangel.
