= John Hodgson (Kentucky politician) =

American politician

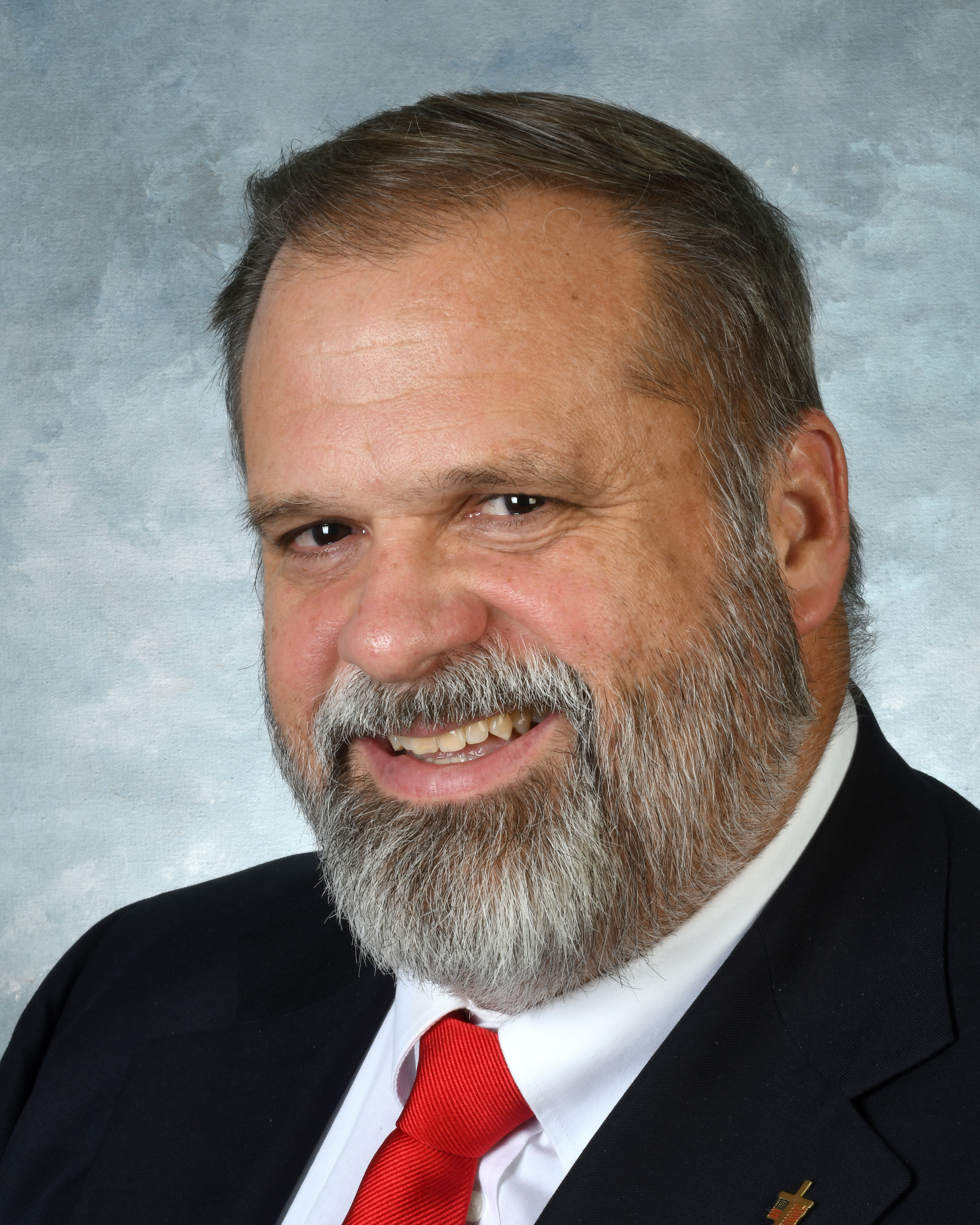

Member of the Kentucky House of Representatives from the 36th district
- Incumbent
- Assumed office January 1, 2023
- Preceded by: Jerry T. Miller

Personal details
- Born: July 11, 1961 (age 65) Fort Worth, Texas
- Party: Republican
- Education: Texas Tech University (BS); Embry-Riddle University (MA)
- Committees: Elections, Const. Amendments & Intergovernmental Affairs; State Government; Transportation

John Foster Hodgson (born July 11, 1961) is an American politician who has served as a member of the Kentucky House of Representatives since January 2023. He represents Kentucky's 36th House district, which consists of part of Jefferson County.

== Biography ==
Hodgson was born and raised in Fort Worth, Texas, where both his parents were stationed in World War II. He earned a Bachelor of Science in industrial engineering from Texas Tech University in 1984 and a Master of Science in aeronautical science from Embry-Riddle Aeronautical University in 2007. Later, Hodgson attended Liberty University and studied public policy for one year.

He moved to Jefferson County, Kentucky, in 1985 and worked for United Parcel Service (UPS). Hodgson would remain with UPS for 32 years, serving in various management positions, before retiring in 2016 to work as the operations director for Kentucky Governor Matt Bevin. Currently, Hodgson serves as president of Bigfoot Strategies, a consulting firm for businesses, non-profits, and political entities.

Hodgson has served in various community leadership roles such as chair of the Fisherville Area Neighborhood Association, president of the Louisville Tea Party, and the legislative district 36 chair of the Jefferson County Republican Party.

He is a Christian.

== Political career ==
=== Elections ===
- 2022 Hodgson won the 2022 Republican primary with 2,015 votes (47.9%) against David Howser and Richard Crawford, and was unopposed in the 2022 Kentucky House of Representatives election, winning with 14,667 votes. He assumed office on January 1, 2023.
- 2024 Hodgson was unopposed in the 2024 Republican primary and won the 2024 Kentucky House of Representatives election with 15,601 votes (57.9%) against Democratic candidate William Zorn.

Kentucky House of Representatives
Preceded by Jerry T. Miller	Member of the Kentucky House of Representatives; 2023–present	Succeeded by incumbent
