= Chad Aull =

American politician

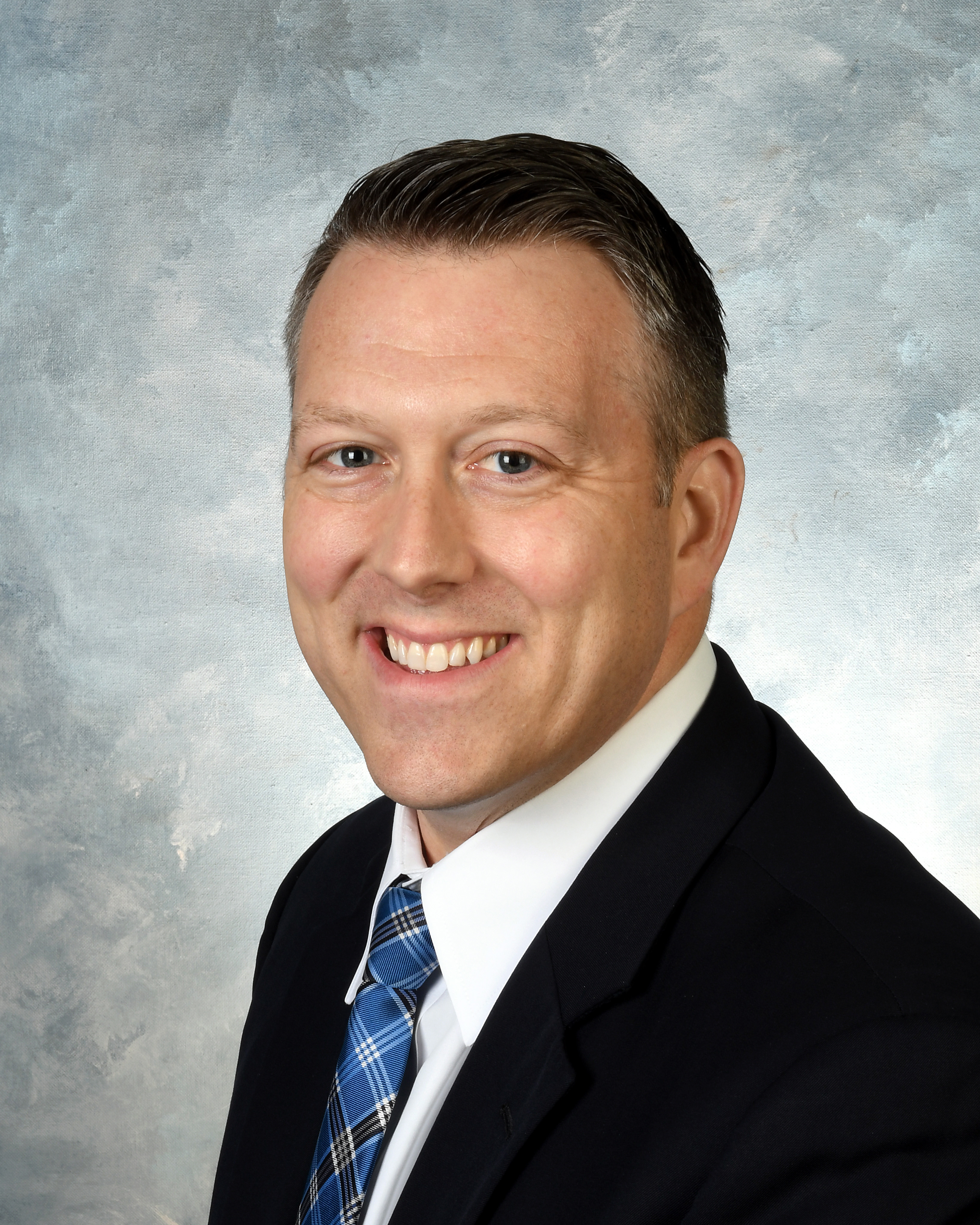

Member of the Kentucky House of Representatives from the 79th district
- Incumbent
- Assumed office January 1, 2023
- Preceded by: Susan Westrom

Personal details
- Born: January 28, 1982 (age 44)
- Party: Democratic
- Spouse: Marisa Aull
- Children: 2
- Education: Western Kentucky University (BS)
- Website: https://www.chadaull.com

Chad R. Aull (/ˈɑːl/ AHL; born January 28, 1982) is an American politician who has served as a member of the Kentucky House of Representatives since January 2023. He represents Kentucky's 79th House district.

== Biography ==
Aull earned a Bachelor of Science from Western Kentucky University in 2004. He is a Catholic.

== Electoral history ==
=== 2022 ===
Democratic primary results
Party	Candidate	Votes	%
Democratic	Chad Aull	2,790	86.9
Democratic	Justin Bramhall	422	13.1
Total votes		3,212	100.0

2022 Kentucky House of Representatives 79th district election
Party	Candidate	Votes	%
Democratic	Chad Aull	Unopposed	
Total votes		9,215	100.0
Democratic hold			

=== 2024 ===
2024 Kentucky House of Representatives 79th district election
Party	Candidate	Votes	%
Democratic	Chad Aull (incumbent)	Unopposed	
Total votes		12,659	100.0
Democratic hold			
