= Adrielle Camuel =

American politician

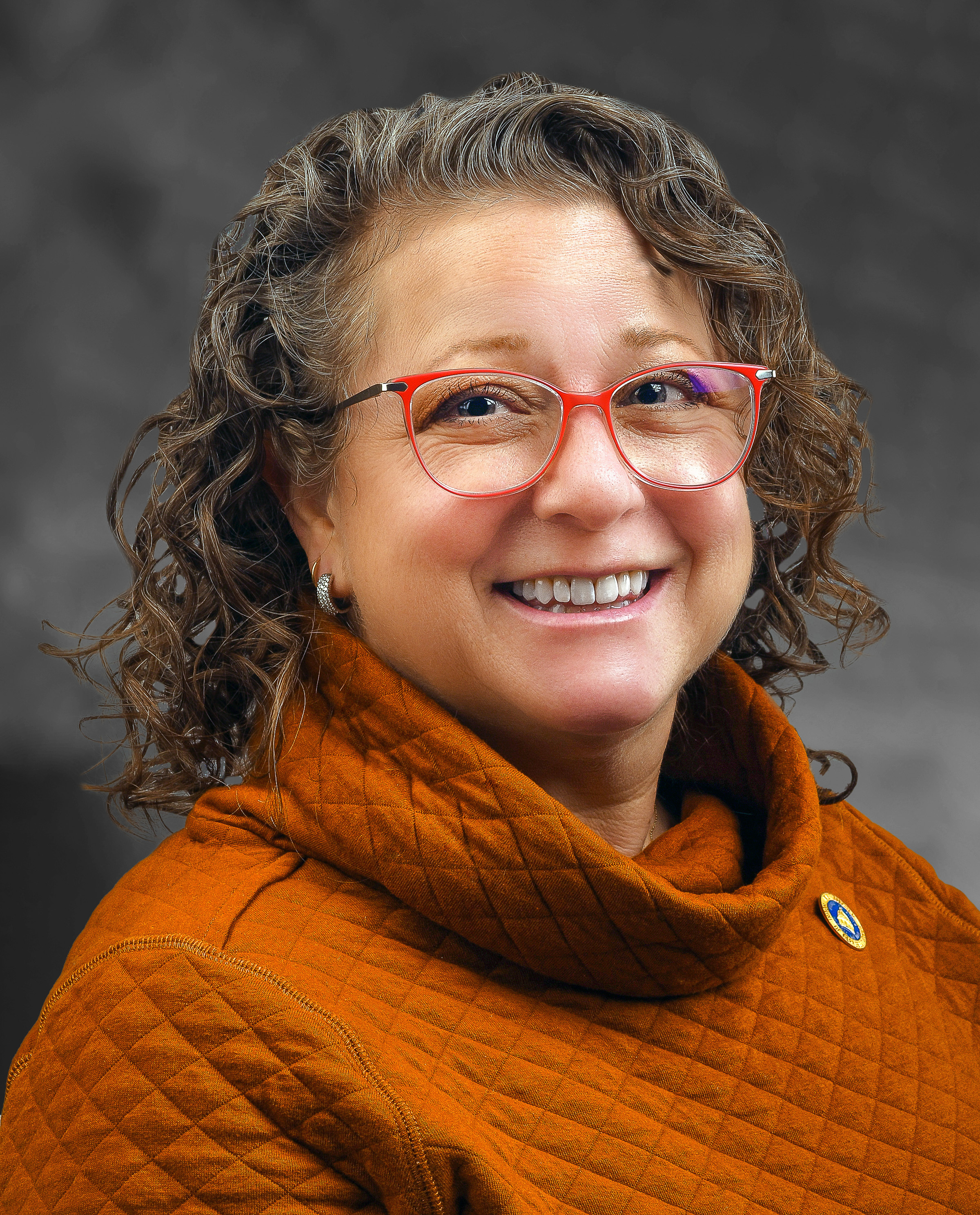

Member of the Kentucky House of Representatives from the 93rd district
- Incumbent
- Assumed office November 29, 2023
- Preceded by: Lamin Swann

Personal details
- Party: Democratic

Adrielle C. Camuel (born May 26, 1972) is an American politician from Kentucky. She is a Democrat and represents District 93 in the state house. Camuel represents southern Lexington and works as a support professional in Fayette County schools. She received a bachelor's and master's degree from the University of Louisville.

== Electoral history ==
=== 2023 ===
2023 Kentucky House of Representatives 93rd district special election
Party	Candidate	Votes	%
Democratic	Adrielle Camuel	7,924	57.6
Republican	Kyle Whalen	5,841	42.4
Total votes		13,765	100.0
Democratic hold			

=== 2024 ===
Democratic primary results
Party	Candidate	Votes	%
Democratic	Adrielle Camuel (incumbent)	1,985	72.6
Democratic	Sarah Ritter	750	27.4
Total votes		2,735	100.0

2024 Kentucky House of Representatives 93rd district election
Party	Candidate	Votes	%
Democratic	Adrielle Camuel (incumbent)	Unopposed	
Total votes		13,264	100.0
Democratic hold			
