= Peyton Griffee =

American politician

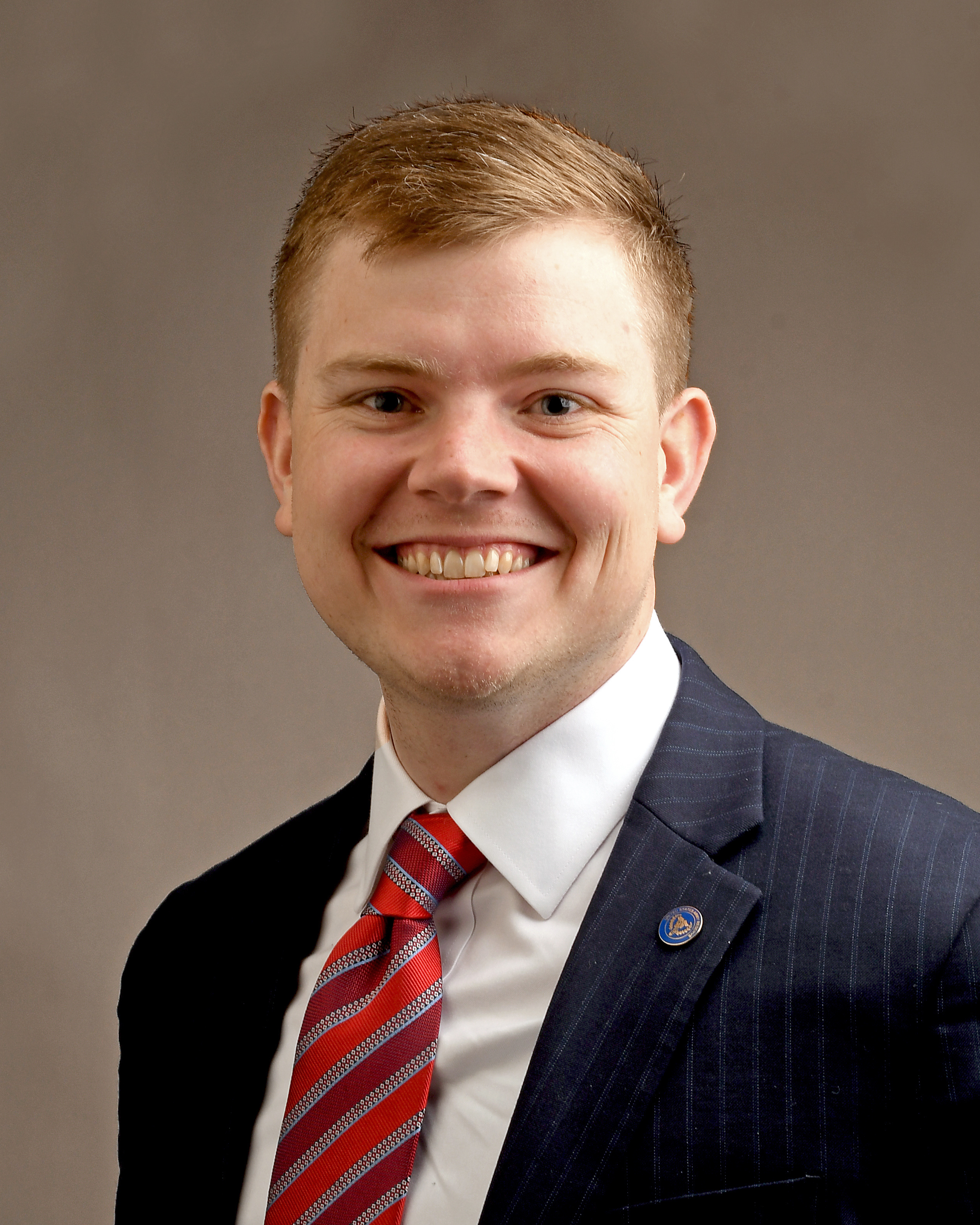

Member of the Kentucky House of Representatives from the 26th district
- Incumbent
- Assumed office March 25, 2024
- Preceded by: Russell Webber

Personal details
- Born: June 28, 1996 (age 30) Mount Washington, Kentucky
- Party: Republican
- Education: Georgetown College (BA); University of Louisville Louis D. Brandeis School of Law (JD)
- Occupation: Attorney, judge advocate
- Committees: Economic Development & Workforce Investment; Judiciary; Local Government; State Government

Military service
- Branch/service: United States Army Reserves Judge Advocate General's Corps
- Rank: Captain
- Unit: 244th Expeditionary Combat Aviation Brigade

Peyton Holmes Porter Griffee (born June 28, 1996) is an American politician from Kentucky who is a Republican member of the Kentucky House of Representatives from the 26th House District. His district comprises parts of Bullitt and Hardin counties. Following the resignation of incumbent representative Russell Webber, Griffee was elected unopposed in a special election held in March 2024.

== Background ==
=== Education ===
Griffee was born in Bullitt County and graduated from Christian Academy of Louisville in 2014. He earned a Bachelor of Arts in political science and government as well as American studies from Georgetown College in 2018. While at Georgetown, Griffee was a member of Lambda Chi Alpha, student government association, Alpha Lambda Delta Honor Society, and Omicron Delta Kappa Honor Society.

Griffee earned his Juris Doctor from the University of Louisville Louis D. Brandeis School of Law in 2021. While in law school he was a member of the Federalist Society, moot court competition team, and was a fellow of the Ordered Liberty program. During this period, Griffee clerked for Kentucky Attorney General Daniel Cameron.

=== Employment ===
Following graduation, Griffee worked for a year as an assistant county attorney in Hardin County before opening his own private practice in Shepherdsville, Kentucky.

Griffee is a captain in the United States Army Reserve, currently serving as a Judge Advocate with the 244th Expeditionary Combat Aviation Brigade.

== Political career ==
While attending Georgetown College, Griffee was elected Vice President of Academic Affairs for the Student Government Association, and also served as president of the Georgetown College Republicans and Public Relations Chair for the State of Kentucky College Republicans. While in law school, he was elected as a class representative to the Student Bar Association. During this period he also founded the Salt River Area Young Republicans, an organization he continues to chair today. Griffee also currently serves as vice-chair of the Kentucky Young Republican Federation.

=== Elections ===
- 2024 (Special): Incumbent Russell Webber of Kentucky's 26th House District resigned to accept a position as chief deputy treasurer for Kentucky State Treasurer Mark Metcalfe. Governor Andy Beshear called for a special election to be held on March 19, 2024. Griffee was unopposed in the 2024 special election.
- 2024: Griffee was unopposed in both the 2024 Republican primary and the 2024 Kentucky House of Representatives election, winning the latter with 15,070 votes.
