= Greg Elkins =

American politician

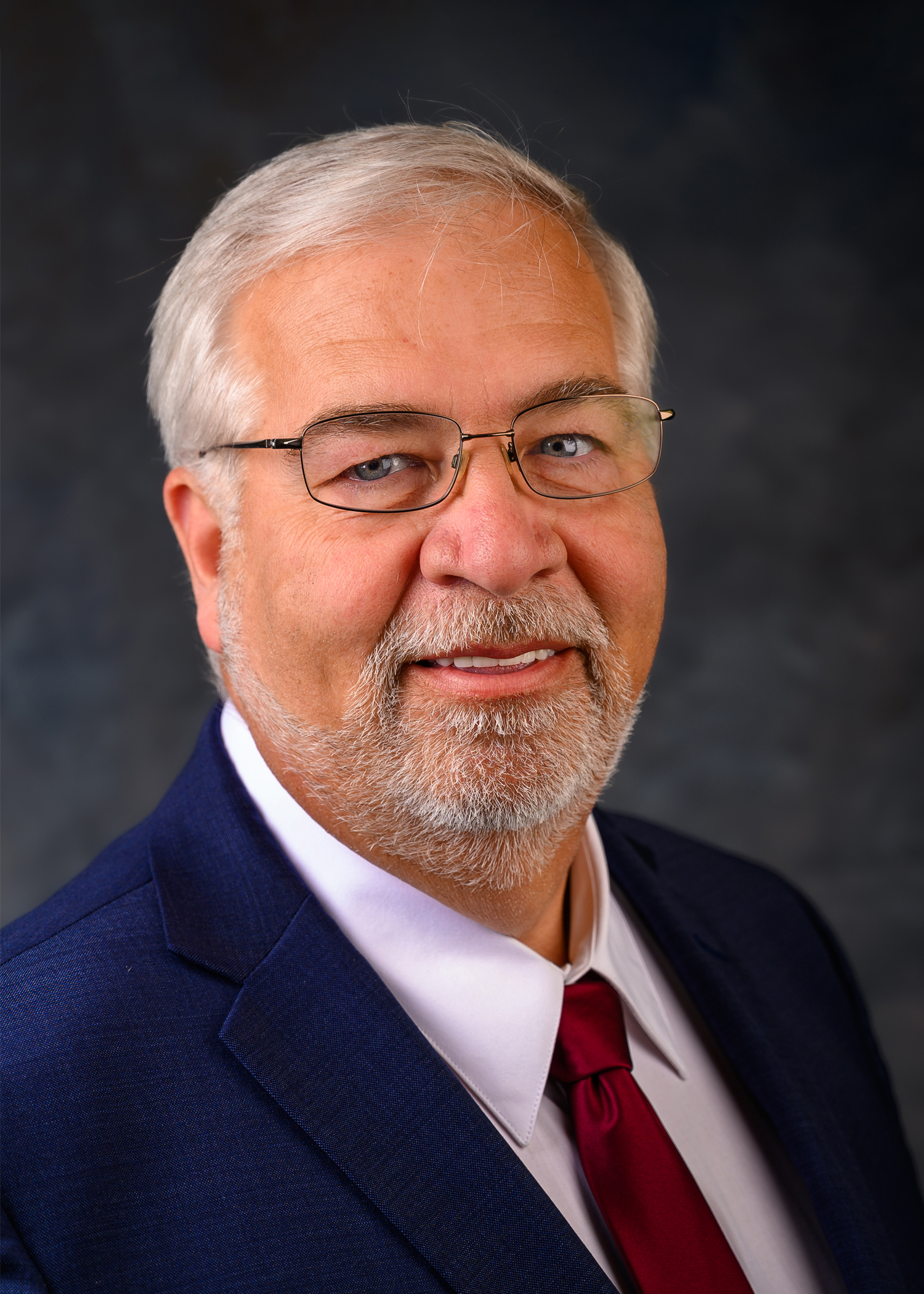
- Official portrait, 2023

Member of the Kentucky Senate from the 28th district
- Incumbent
- Assumed office June 8, 2023
- Preceded by: Ralph Alvarado

Personal details
- Born: October 10, 1964 (age 61)
- Party: Republican

Gregory Allen Elkins (born October 10, 1964) is an American politician from Kentucky. He is a Republican who has represented District 28 in the Kentucky Senate since June 8, 2023. Elkins won a special election on May 16, 2023. He is also a businessman and CEO of a waste management company. He previously served two terms as a Clark County Magistrate in Winchester, Kentucky.
