= Bill Wesley =

American politician

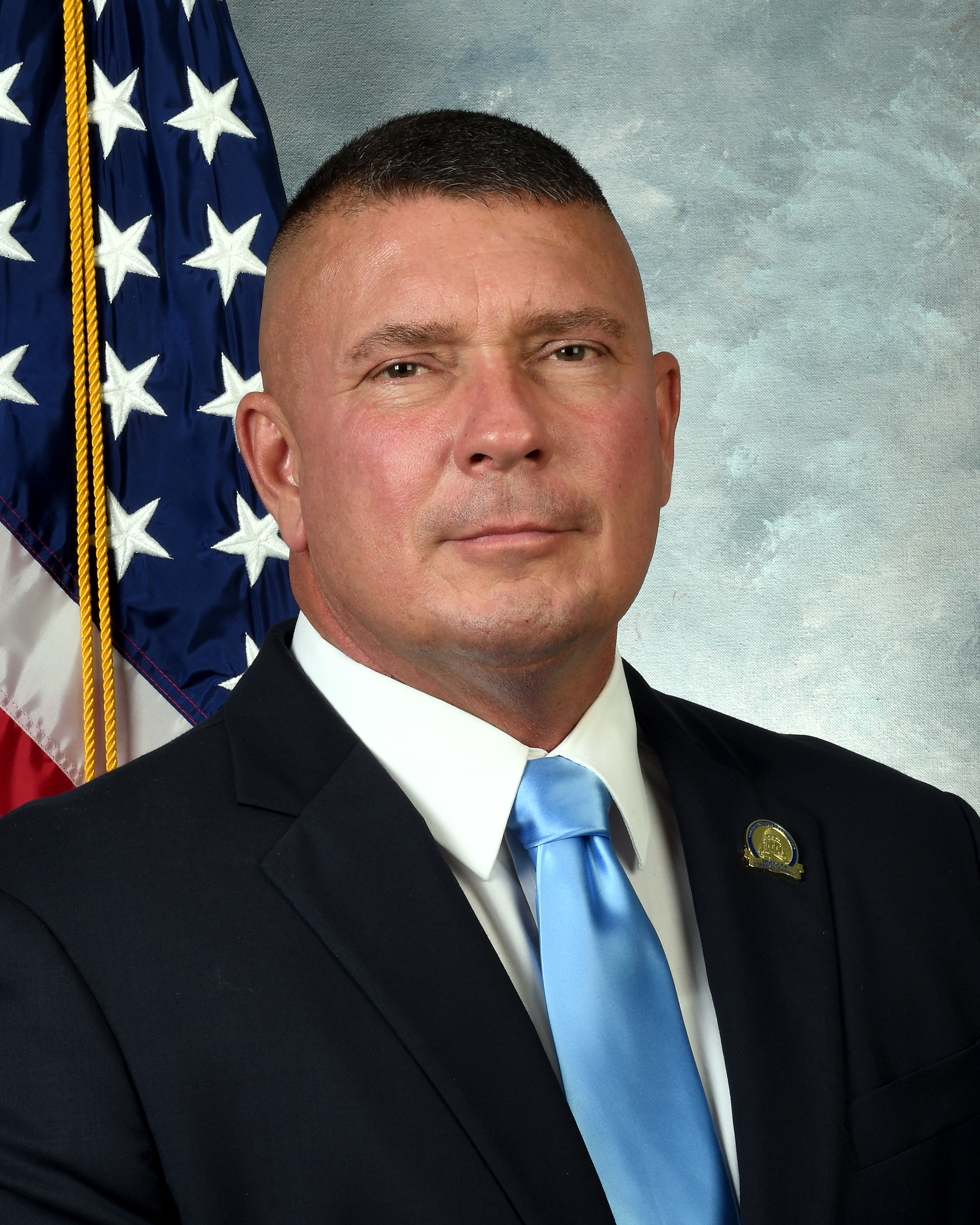

Member of the Kentucky House of Representatives from the 91st district
- Incumbent
- Assumed office January 1, 2021
- Preceded by: Cluster Howard

Personal details
- Born: October 26, 1971 (age 55)
- Party: Republican
- Children: 3
- Committees: Veterans, Military Affairs, & Public Protection (vice chair); Natural Resources & Energy; Tourism & Outdoor Recreation

Military service
- Branch/service: United States Marine Corps

Bill E. Wesley (born October 26, 1971) is an American politician. He serves as a Republican member of the Kentucky House of Representatives from Kentucky's 91st House district. His district includes Estill and Powell counties as well as part of Madison County. Wesley ran for the Kentucky Senate in 2026, losing the Republican primary to incumbent senator Brandon Smith.

== Background ==
Following his graduation from Edison High School in Milan, Ohio, Wesley enlisted in the United States Marine Corps.

He also serves as a Pentecostal pastor, and has previously served as a chaplain for the Ravenna Police Department, Irvine Police Department, and Estill County Sheriff’s Office.

== Political career ==
=== Elections ===
- 2020 Kentucky's 91st House district incumbent Cluster Howard chose not to seek reelection. Wesley won the 2020 Republican primary with 2,249 votes (51.3%) and won the 2020 Kentucky House of Representatives election with 12,274 votes (70.8%) against Democratic candidate Paula Clemons-Combs.
- 2022 Wesley won the 2022 Republican primary with 2,510 votes (63.2%) and won the 2022 Kentucky House of Representatives election with 9,050 votes (68.2%) against Democratic candidate Martina Jackson.
- 2024 Wesley won the 2024 Republican primary with 1,673 votes (53.2%) and was unopposed in the 2024 Kentucky House of Representatives election, winning with 14,878 votes.
- 2026 Wesley unsuccessfully challenged senator Brandon Smith of Kentucky's 30th Senate district in the 2026 Republican primary.
