= Phillip Wheeler =

American politician (born 1978)

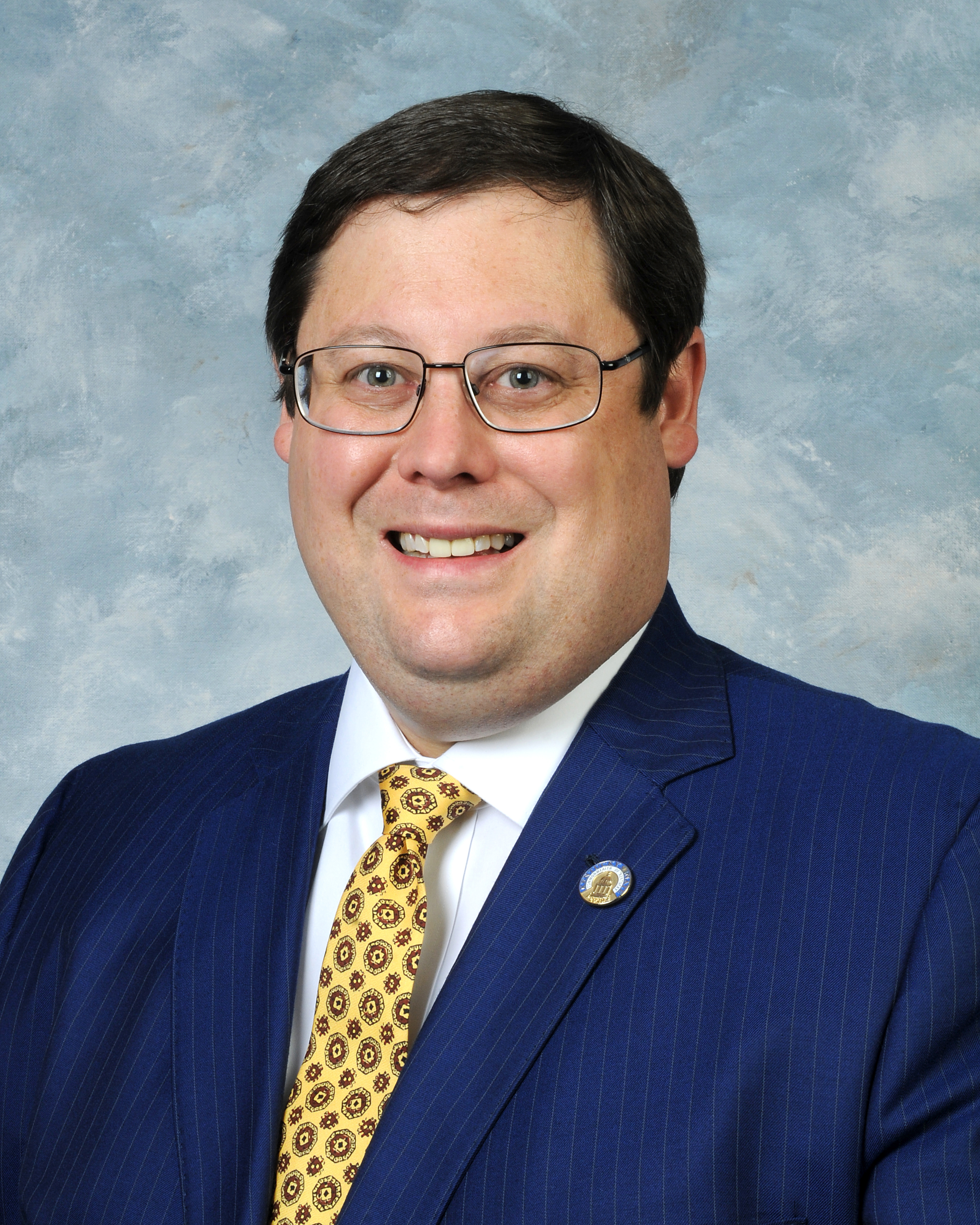
- Official portrait, 2020

Member of the Kentucky Senate from the 31st district
- Incumbent
- Assumed office March 19, 2019
- Preceded by: Ray Jones II

Personal details
- Born: April 13, 1978 (age 48) Pikeville, Kentucky, U.S.
- Party: Republican
- Education: Transylvania University (BA); University of Kentucky (JD)

Charles Phillip Wheeler Jr. (born April 13, 1978) is an American attorney and politician serving as a member of the Kentucky Senate from the 31st district. Wheeler came into office during a Special Election on March 5, 2019, defeating Democrat Darrell Pugh. He assumed office on March 19, 2019. Wheeler was re-elected for a full term with 72.8% of the vote on November 3, 2020, defeating Democratic challenger Glenn Martin Hammond.

== Early life and education ==
Wheeler was born in Pikeville, Kentucky in 1978. He earned a Bachelor of Arts degree in history and German from Transylvania University and a Juris Doctor from the University of Kentucky College of Law. Wheeler was a Fulbright scholar in Regensburg, Germany from 2000 and 2001.

== Career ==
Outside of politics, Wheeler works as a lawyer at Wheeler & Baker, PLLC in Pikeville, KY. As a lawyer, Wheeler has represented former coal miners who suffer from black lung disease. He was elected to the Kentucky Senate in a March 2019 special election, succeeding Ray Jones II. He also serves as vice chair of the House Economic Development, Tourism and Labor Committee.
