= Amy Neighbors =

American politician (born 1975)

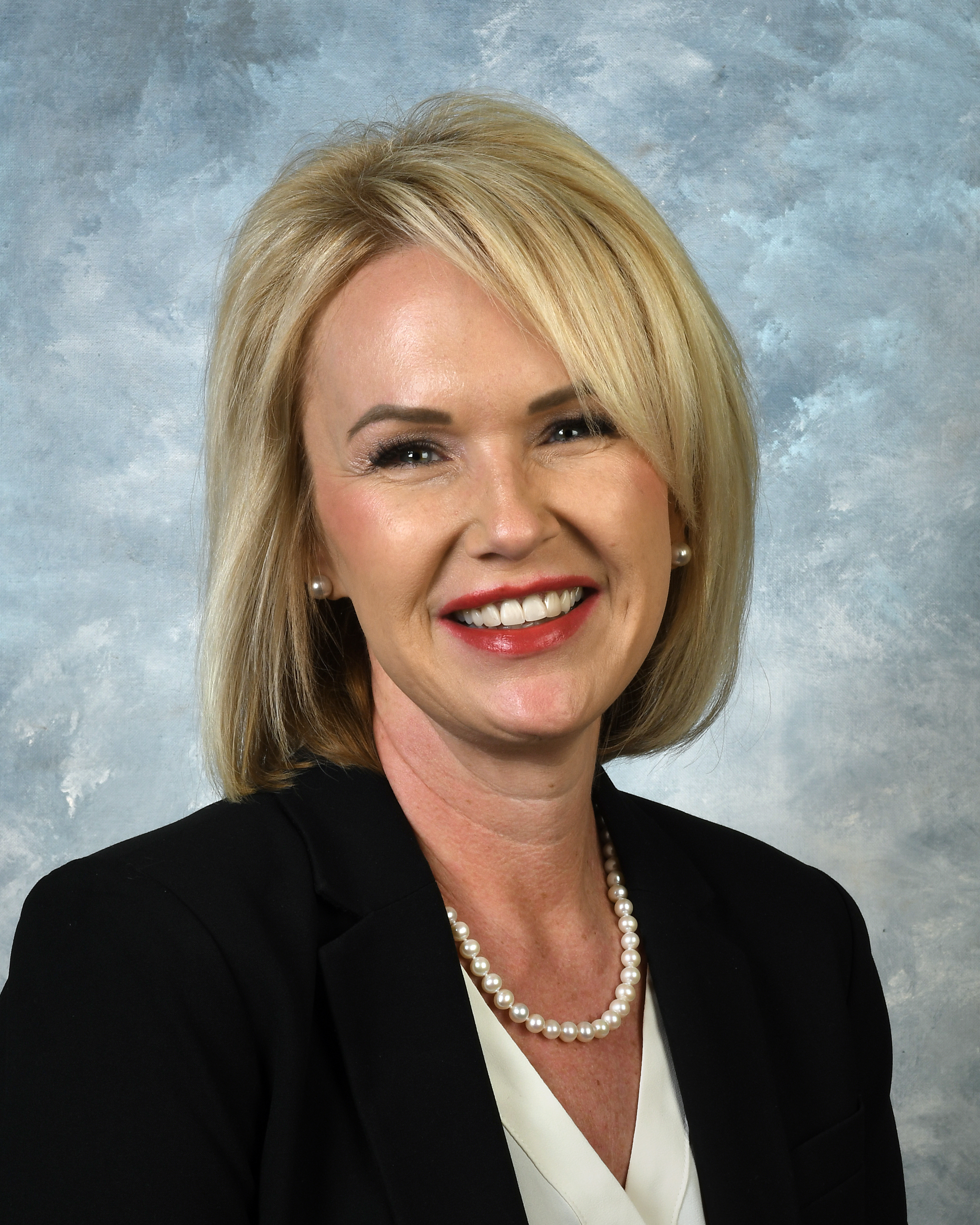

Member of the Kentucky House of Representatives from the 21st district
- Incumbent
- Assumed office January 1, 2023
- Preceded by: Bart Rowland

Personal details
- Born: November 12, 1975 (age 50)
- Party: Republican
- Education: Western Kentucky University (BS)
- Committees: Licensing, Occupations, & Administrative Regulations; Transportation; Agriculture; Health Services

Amy Danielle Neighbors (born November 12, 1975) is an American politician who has served as a member of the Kentucky House of Representatives since January 2023. She represents Kentucky's 21st House district, which includes Adair, Cumberland, Metcalfe, and Monroe Counties. She is the first woman to ever represent Metcalfe County in the House.

== Background ==
Neighbors graduated from Metcalfe County High School in 1994, and earned a Bachelor of Science in health care administration from Western Kentucky University in 1999. She is a retired nursing home administrator.

== Political career ==
=== Elections ===
2022 Neighbors won the 2022 Republican primary with 3,609 votes (33.2%) against a crowded field of four opponents. Neighbors was unopposed in the 2022 Kentucky House of Representatives election, winning with 13,283 votes. She assumed office on January 1, 2023.

2024 Neighbors was unopposed in the 2024 Republican primary and won the 2024 Kentucky House of Representatives election with 18,175 votes (82.5%) against Democratic candidate Jeffery Humble.

Kentucky House of Representatives
Preceded by Bart Rowland	Member of the Kentucky House of Representatives; 2023–present	Succeeded by incumbent
