= Shane Baker =

American politician

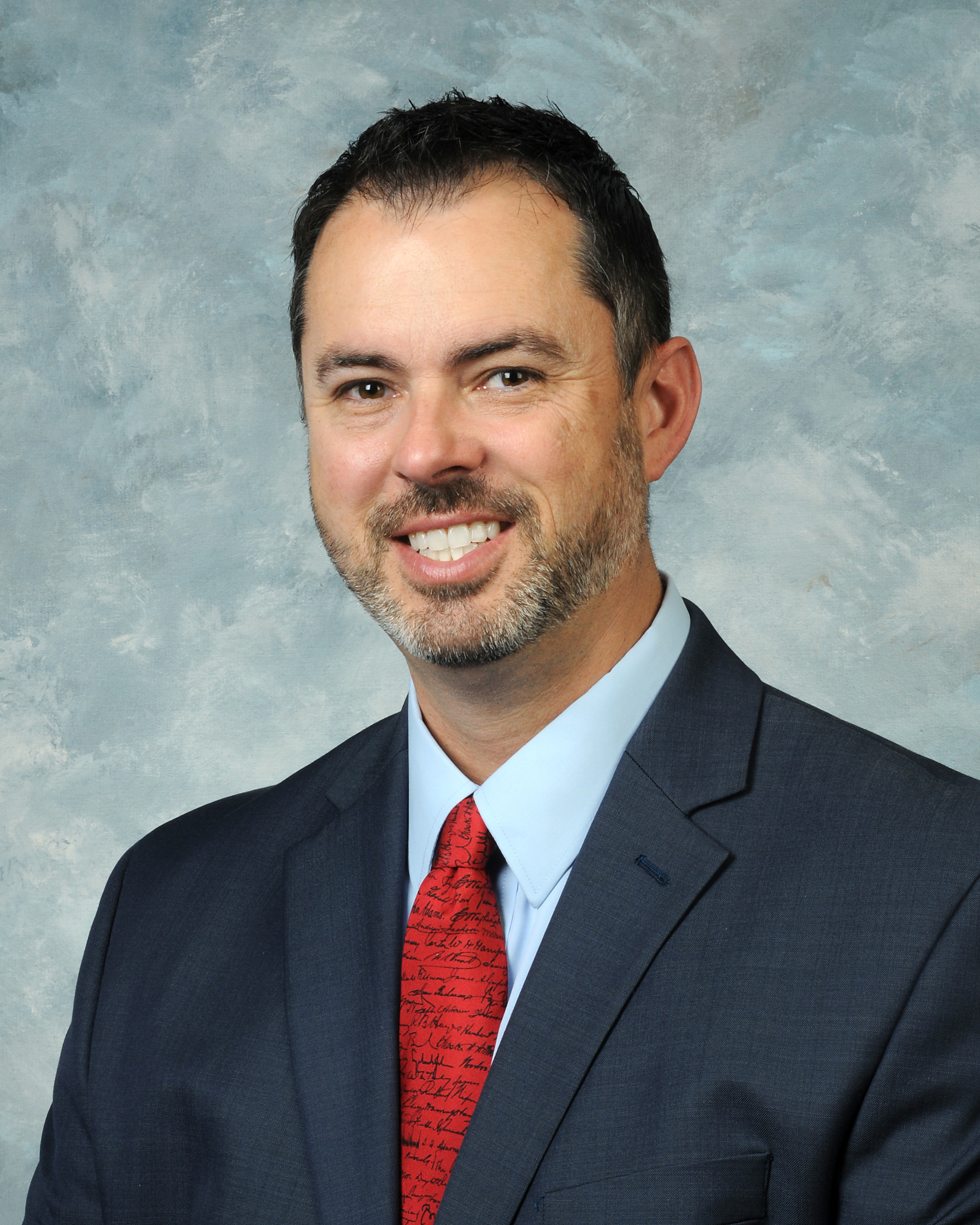

Member of the Kentucky House of Representatives from the 85th district
- Incumbent
- Assumed office January 1, 2021
- Preceded by: Tommy Turner

Personal details
- Party: Republican
- Children: 2
- Committees: Postsecondary Education (Vice Chair); Economic Development & Workforce Investment; Families & Children; Tourism & Outdoor Recreation

Reuben Shane Baker is an American politician and Republican member of the Kentucky House of Representatives from Kentucky's 85th House district. His district includes parts of Laurel and Pulaski counties. Baker was sworn into office on January 1, 2021.

== Background ==
Baker grew up in Nancy, Kentucky, and has resided in Somerset for nearly 30 years. He was a small business owner for over two decades before selling his business to work as a field representative for the Kentucky Department for Local Government during the administration of Governor Matt Bevin.

He is currently employed by Transamerica.

== Political career ==
=== Elections ===
- 2020 Kentucky's 85th House district incumbent Tommy Turner chose not to seek reelection. Baker won the 2020 Republican primary with 2,965 votes (34.3%) and was unopposed in the 2020 Kentucky House of Representatives election, winning with 18,706 votes.
- 2022 Baker was unopposed in the 2022 Republican primary and won the 2022 Kentucky House of Representatives election with 11,756 votes (81.9%) against Democratic candidate Byron Vaught.
- 2024 Baker was unopposed in both the 2024 Republican primary and the 2024 Kentucky House of Representatives election, winning the latter with 17,978 votes.
