= Lindsey Burke =

American lawyer and politician

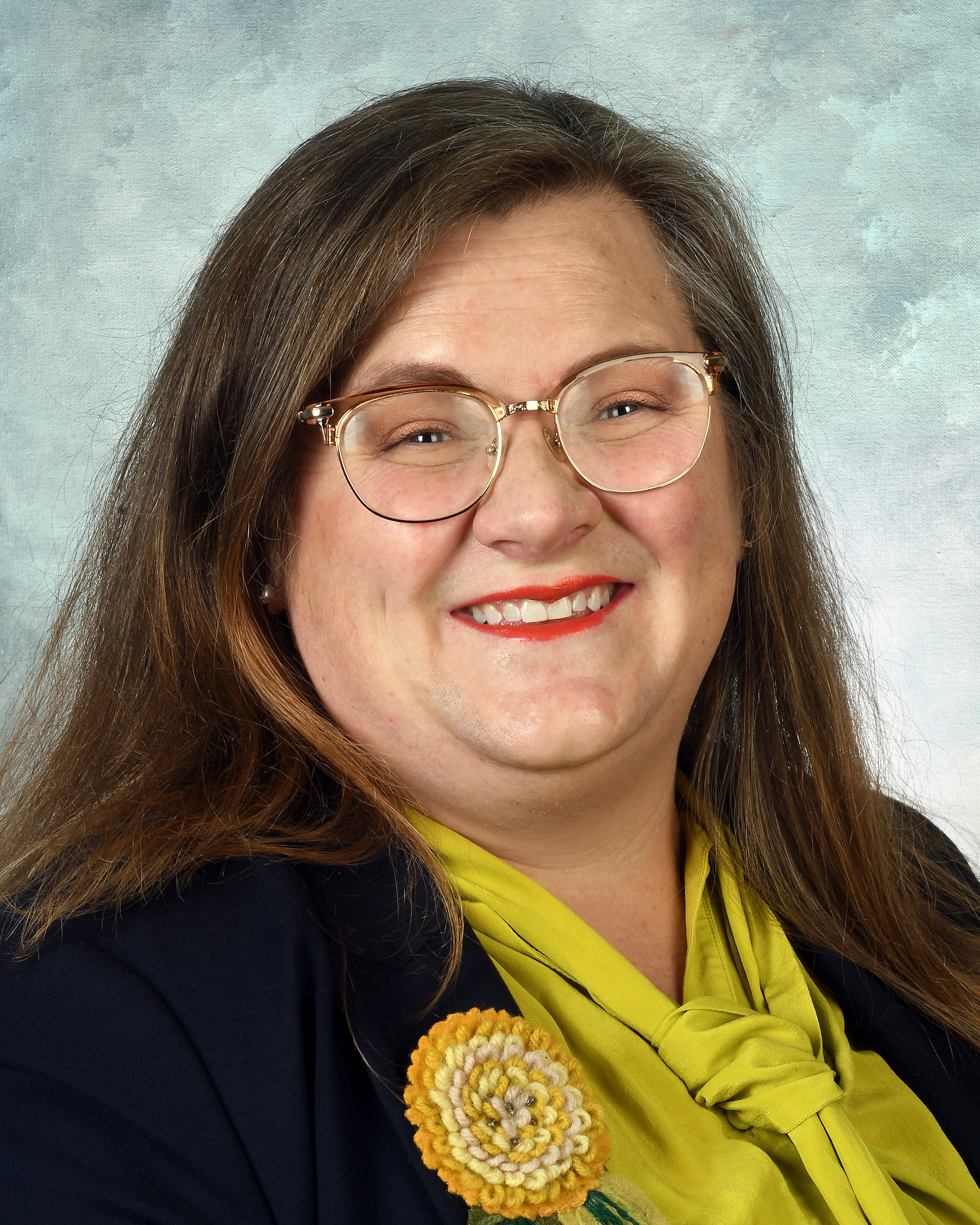

Minority Leader-designate of the Kentucky House of Representatives
- Assuming office January 5, 2027
- Succeeding: Pamela Stevenson

Member of the Kentucky House of Representatives from the 75th district
- Incumbent
- Assumed office January 1, 2023
- Preceded by: Kelly Flood

Personal details
- Born: January 29, 1984 (age 42)
- Party: Democratic
- Education: Florida State University (BS), University of Cincinnati (MA), University of Chicago (JD)
- Profession: Lawyer

Lindsey Thomas Burke (born January 29, 1984) is an American politician who has served as a member of the Kentucky House of Representatives since January 1, 2023. She is a Democrat, and represents Kentucky's 75th House district. She currently serves as House Minority Caucus Chair, and previously served as minority whip From 2024 to 2025.

== Biography ==
Burke earned a Bachelor of Science in social work from Florida State University in 2007, a Master of Arts in social service administration from the University of Chicago in 2012, and a Juris Doctor from the University of Cincinnati in 2015. She founded Micah Legal, a nonprofit civil law firm in Lexington, Kentucky and worked as one of its attorneys.

As a child, she was in Girl Scouts. She is a Disciple of Christ.

== Electoral history ==
=== 2022 ===
Democratic primary results
Party	Candidate	Votes	%
Democratic	Lindsey Burke	2,822	84.5
Democratic	Chris Couch	517	15.5
Total votes		3,339	100.0

2022 Kentucky House of Representatives 75th district election
Party	Candidate	Votes	%
Democratic	Lindsey Burke	Unopposed	
Total votes		8,440	100.0
Democratic hold			

=== 2024 ===
2024 Kentucky House of Representatives 75th district election
Party	Candidate	Votes	%
Democratic	Lindsey Burke (incumbent)	Unopposed	
Total votes		11,561	100.0
Democratic hold			

Kentucky House of Representatives
Preceded by Kelly Flood	Member of the Kentucky House of Representatives; 2023–present	Succeeded by incumbent
