= Josh Calloway =

American politician (born 1979)

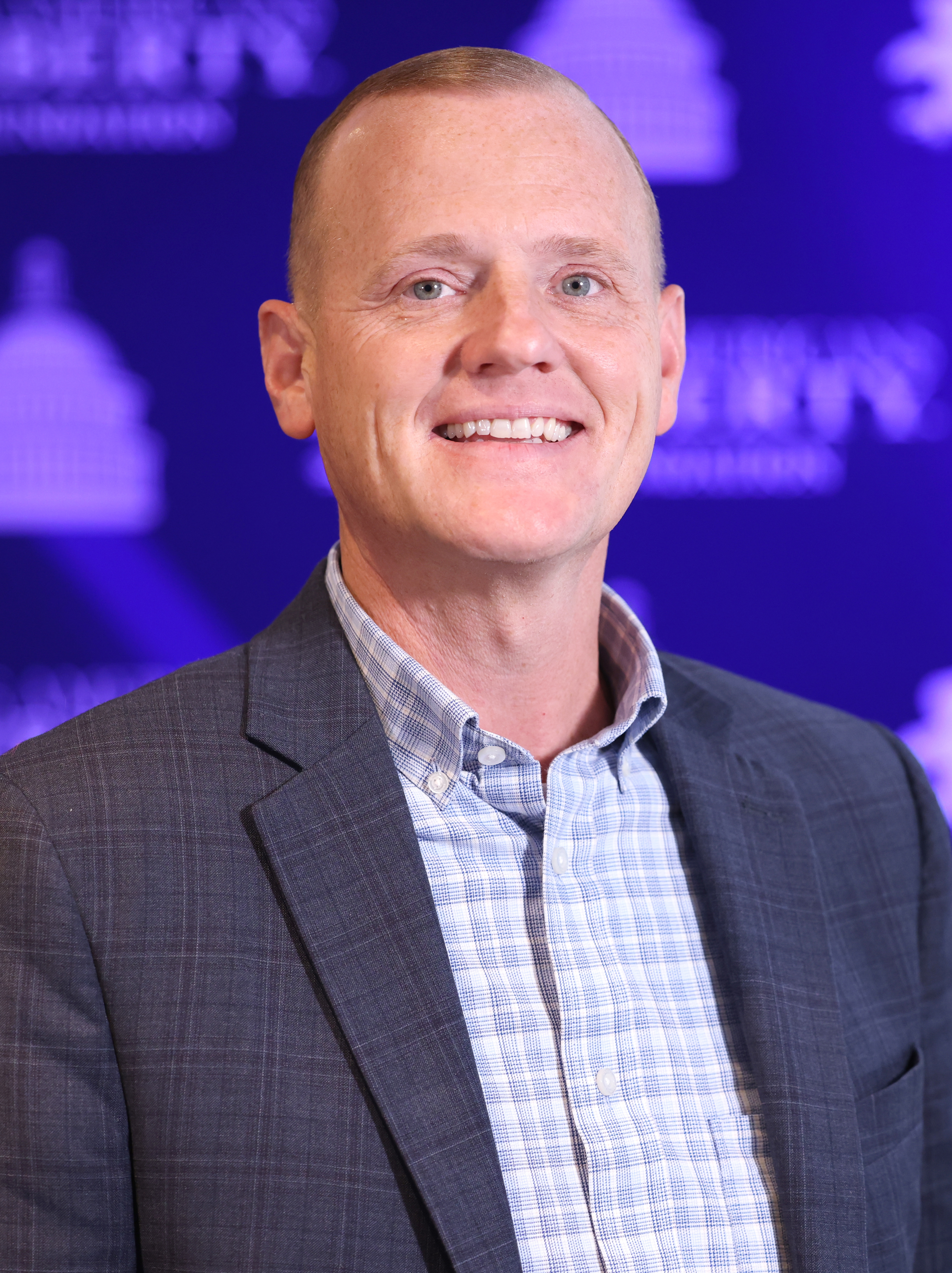
- Calloway at the 2024 Hazlitt Summit hosted by Young Americans for Liberty Foundation

Member of the Kentucky House of Representatives from the 10th district
- Incumbent
- Assumed office January 1, 2021
- Preceded by: Dean Schamore

Personal details
- Born: February 3, 1979 (age 47)
- Party: Republican
- Education: Eastern Kentucky University
- Committees: Elections, Constitutional Amendments, and Intergovernmental Affairs; Economic Development and Workforce Investment; Primary and Secondary Education

Joshua Shayne Calloway (born February 3, 1979) is an American politician from Kentucky. A member of the Republican Party, he has been a member of the Kentucky House of Representatives since January 2021. He represents Kentucky's 10th House district, which includes Breckenridge and Hardin counties.

== Early life and education ==
Calloway was born February 3, 1979. He grew up in Fordsville, Kentucky, but currently resides in Irvington. He earned a certification in health and safety from Eastern Kentucky University.

== Career ==
Prior to entering politics, he worked for the National Office Furniture and the Protech EIS Corporation. He has also been a preacher, volunteer jail chaplain, music director, and piano player at Pleasant View Baptist Church. As of 2019, he was also director of Hope Through Truth Ministries and the Hope Academy, a transitional living home for at-risk men.

== Political career ==
Calloway was elected from Kentucky's 10th House district, which includes Breckenridge and Hardin counties.

=== Elections ===
- 2018: Calloway was unopposed in the 2018 Republican primary but was defeated in the 2018 Kentucky House of Representatives election by incumbent Dean Schamore.
- 2020: Calloway was unopposed in the 2020 Republican primary and won the 2020 Kentucky House of Representatives election against incumbent Dean Schamore, winning with 11,624 votes.
- 2022: Calloway was unopposed in the 2022 Republican primary and won the 2022 Kentucky House of Representatives election against independent candidate John Whipple, winning with 11,516 votes.
- 2024: Calloway won the 2024 Republican primary against challenger Julie Cantwell, winning with 2,773 votes, and won the 2024 Kentucky House of Representatives election with 15,702 votes (69%) against Democratic candidate John Whipple.

=== Tenure ===
In 2022, Calloway opposed legislation to legalize sports betting in Kentucky. Although Republicans held a supermajority in both chambers of the Kentucky General Assembly, the party was split on the issue of gambling.

In 2024, he criticized Governor Andy Beshear for issuing an executive order to ban conversion therapy for LGBT youth. Calloway said the order defied the will of the legislature. Republican lawmakers had repeatedly blocked efforts to ban conversion therapy.

In 2024, Calloway introduced legislation (House Bill 208) to propose an amendment to the Kentucky Constitution to allow public funds to be allocated to charter schools. The state constitution currently allows education appropriations to go to "common schools" only, which the Kentucky Supreme Court has interpreted to mean public schools.
