= 2023 Kentucky General Assembly =

2023 session of the Kentucky General Assembly
←	2022	2024	→
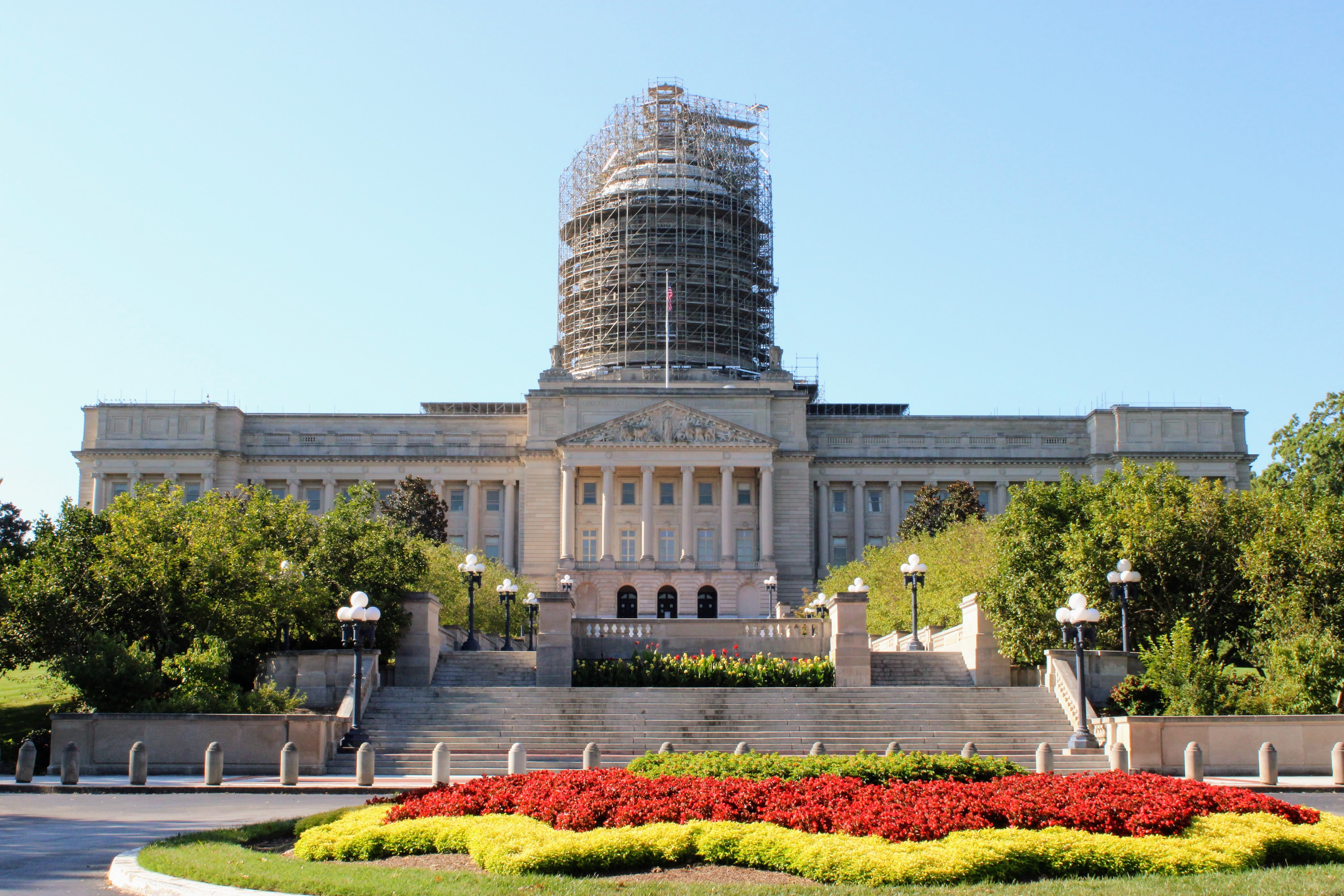
- The Kentucky State Capitol in 2023

Overview
- Legislative body: Kentucky General Assembly
- Jurisdiction: Kentucky
- Term: January 3, 2023 – March 30, 2023

Senate
- Members: 38
- President: Robert Stivers (R–25th); Jan. 8, 2013 - present
- Majority leader: Damon Thayer (R–17th); Jan. 8, 2013 - Jan. 1, 2025
- Minority Leader: Gerald Neal (D–33rd); Jan. 3, 2023 - present
- Party control: Republican

House of Representatives
- Members: 100
- Speaker: David Osborne (R–59th); Jan. 8, 2019 - present
- Minority Leader: Derrick Graham (D–57th); Jan. 3, 2023 - Jan. 1, 2025
- Party control: Republican

The 2023 Kentucky General Assembly was a meeting of the Kentucky General Assembly, composed of the Kentucky Senate and the Kentucky House of Representatives. It convened in Frankfort on January 3, 2023, and adjourned sine die on March 30, 2023. It was the fourth regular session of the legislature during the tenure of governor Andy Beshear.

Republicans maintained their majorities in both chambers following the 2022 elections for the senate and the house.

This session saw the impeachment and conviction of commonwealth's attorney Ronnie Goldy, which was the first impeachment since 1991 and the first trial held since 1888.

== Major legislation ==
=== Enacted ===
- SB 150: An act relating to children (passed over veto)

== Major resolutions ==
=== Adopted ===
House resolutions

- HR 30: A resolution laying before the House of Representatives Articles of Impeachment against Ronnie Lee Goldy, Jr., Commonwealth's attorney for the 21st Judicial Circuit consisting of Rowan, Bath, Menifee, and Montgomery Counties

== Party summary ==
=== Senate ===
Overview of Senate membership by party
	Party (shading shows control)		Total	Vacant
	Democratic	Republican	Total	Vacant
End of previous session	8	30	38	0
Begin (January 3, 2023)	6	31	37	1
January 6, 2023	6	30	36	2
March 2, 2023	7	30	37	1
Final voting share	18.9%	81.1%		
Beginning of the next session	7	31	38	0

=== House of Representatives ===
Overview of House membership by party
	Party (shading shows control)		Total	Vacant
	Democratic	Republican	Total	Vacant
End of previous session	25	75	100	0
Begin (January 3, 2023)	20	80	100	0
Final voting share	20.0%	80.0%		
Beginning of the next session	20	79	99	1

== Leadership ==
=== Senate ===
==== Presiding ====
- President: Robert Stivers (R)
- President pro tempore: David P. Givens (R)

==== Majority (Republican) ====
- Majority Leader: Damon Thayer
- Majority Whip: Mike Wilson
- Majority Caucus Chair: Julie Raque Adams

==== Minority (Democratic) ====
- Minority Leader: Gerald Neal
- Minority Whip: David Yates
- Minority Caucus Chair: Reggie Thomas

=== House of Representatives ===
==== Presiding ====
- Speaker: David Osborne (R)
- Speaker pro tempore: David Meade (R)

==== Majority (Republican) ====
- Majority Leader: Steven Rudy
- Majority Whip: Jason Nemes
- Majority Caucus Chair: Suzanne Miles

==== Minority (Democratic) ====
- Minority Leader: Derrick Graham
- Minority Whip: Rachel Roberts
- Minority Caucus Chair: Cherlynn Stevenson

== Members ==
=== Senate ===
Senators in odd-numbered districts were elected in 2020, while senators in even-numbered districts were elected in 2022.

▌1. Jason Howell (R)
▌2. Danny Carroll (R)
▌3. Whitney Westerfield (R)
▌4. Robby Mills (R)
▌5. Stephen Meredith (R)
▌6. Lindsey Tichenor (R)
▌7. Adrienne Southworth (R)
▌8. Gary Boswell (R)
▌9. David P. Givens (R)
▌10. Matthew Deneen (R)
▌11. John Schickel (R)
▌12. Amanda Mays Bledsoe (R)
▌13. Reggie Thomas (D)
▌14. Jimmy Higdon (R)
▌15. Rick Girdler (R)
▌16. Max Wise (R)
▌17. Damon Thayer (R)
▌18. Robin L. Webb (D)
▌19. Cassie Chambers Armstrong (D) (from March 2)

▌20. Gex Williams (R)
▌21. Brandon J. Storm (R)
▌22. Donald Douglas (R)
▌23. Christian McDaniel (R)
▌24. Shelley Funke Frommeyer (R)
▌25. Robert Stivers (R)
▌26. Karen Berg (D)
▌27. Steve West (R)
▌28. Ralph Alvarado (R) (until January 6)
▌29. Johnnie Turner (R)
▌30. Brandon Smith (R)
▌31. Phillip Wheeler (R)
▌32. Mike Wilson (R)
▌33. Gerald Neal (D)
▌34. Jared Carpenter (R)
▌35. Denise Harper Angel (D)
▌36. Julie Raque Adams (R)
▌37. David Yates (D)
▌38. Michael J. Nemes (R)

Senate composition at the end of the session Held by Democrats Held by Republicans Vacant

=== House of Representatives ===
All 100 house districts were last up for election in 2022.

▌1. Steven Rudy (R)
▌2. Richard Heath (R)
▌3. Randy Bridges (R)
▌4. Wade Williams (R)
▌5. Mary Beth Imes (R)
▌6. Chris Freeland (R)
▌7. Suzanne Miles (R)
▌8. Walker Thomas (R)
▌9. Myron Dossett (R)
▌10. Josh Calloway (R)
▌11. Jonathan Dixon (R)
▌12. Jim Gooch Jr. (R)
▌13. DJ Johnson (R)
▌14. Scott Lewis (R)
▌15. Rebecca Raymer (R)
▌16. Jason Petrie (R)
▌17. Robert Duvall (R)
▌18. Samara Heavrin (R)
▌19. Michael Meredith (R)
▌20. Kevin Jackson (R)
▌21. Amy Neighbors (R)
▌22. Shawn McPherson (R)
▌23. Steve Riley (R)
▌24. Brandon Reed (R)
▌25. Steve Bratcher (R)
▌26. Russell Webber (R)
▌27. Nancy Tate (R)
▌28. Jared Bauman (R)
▌29. Kevin Bratcher (R)
▌30. Daniel Grossberg (D)
▌31. Susan Tyler Witten (R)
▌32. Tina Bojanowski (D)
▌33. Jason Nemes (R)
▌34. Sarah Stalker (D)
▌35. Lisa Willner (D)
▌36. John Hodgson (R)
▌37. Emily Callaway (R)
▌38. Rachel Roarx (D)
▌39. Matt Lockett (R)
▌40. Nima Kulkarni (D)
▌41. Josie Raymond (D)
▌42. Keturah Herron (D)
▌43. Pamela Stevenson (D)
▌44. Beverly Chester-Burton (D)
▌45. Killian Timoney (R)
▌46. Al Gentry (D)
▌47. Felicia Rabourn (R)
▌48. Ken Fleming (R)
▌49. Thomas Huff (R)
▌50. Candy Massaroni (R)

▌51. Michael Pollock (R)
▌52. Ken Upchurch (R)
▌53. James Tipton (R)
▌54. Daniel Elliott (R)
▌55. Kim King (R)
▌56. Daniel Fister (R)
▌57. Derrick Graham (D)
▌58. Jennifer Decker (R)
▌59. David Osborne (R)
▌60. Marianne Proctor (R)
▌61. Savannah Maddox (R)
▌62. Phillip Pratt (R)
▌63. Kim Banta (R)
▌64. Kimberly Poore Moser (R)
▌65. Stephanie Dietz (R)
▌66. Steve Rawlings (R)
▌67. Rachel Roberts (D)
▌68. Mike Clines (R)
▌69. Steven Doan (R)
▌70. William Lawrence (R)
▌71. Josh Bray (R)
▌72. Matthew Koch (R)
▌73. Ryan Dotson (R)
▌74. David Hale (R)
▌75. Lindsey Burke (D)
▌76. Ruth Ann Palumbo (D)
▌77. George Brown Jr. (D)
▌78. Mark Hart (R)
▌79. Chad Aull (D)
▌80. David Meade (R)
▌81. Deanna Frazier (R)
▌82. Nick Wilson (R)
▌83. Josh Branscum (R)
▌84. Chris Fugate (R)
▌85. Shane Baker (R)
▌86. Tom Smith (R)
▌87. Adam Bowling (R)
▌88. Cherlynn Stevenson (D)
▌89. Timmy Truett (R)
▌90. Derek Lewis (R)
▌91. Bill Wesley (R)
▌92. John Blanton (R)
▌93. Lamin Swann (D)
▌94. Jacob Justice (R)
▌95. Ashley Tackett Laferty (D)
▌96. Patrick Flannery (R)
▌97. Bobby McCool (R)
▌98. Danny Bentley (R)
▌99. Richard White (R)
▌100. Scott Sharp (R)

House composition by district Held by Democrats Held by Republicans

== Changes in membership ==
=== Senate changes ===
Senate changes
State (class)	Vacated by	Reason for change	Successor	Date of successor's formal installation (Note: When seated or oath administered, not necessarily when service began.)
19	Vacant	Incumbent Morgan McGarvey (D) resigned at the beginning of this session, having been elected to Kentucky's 3rd congressional district in 2022. A special election was held February 21, 2023.	Cassie Chambers Armstrong (D)	March 2, 2023
28	Ralph Alvarado (R)	Incumbent resigned January 6, 2023, to become Commissioner of the Tennessee Department of Health. A special election was held May 16, 2023.	Vacant until the next session	

=== House of Representatives changes ===
There were no changes in House of Representatives membership during this session.

== Committees ==
=== Senate committees ===
Committee	Chair	Vice Chair
Agriculture	Jason Howell	Gary Boswell
Appropriations and Revenue	Christian McDaniel	Amanda Mays Bledsoe
Banking and Insurance	Jared Carpenter	Rick Girdler
Committee on Committees	Robert Stivers	none
Economic Development, Tourism, and Labor	Max Wise	Phillip Wheeler
Education	Steve West	Gex Williams
Enrollment	Amanda Mays Bledsoe	none
Families and Children	Danny Carroll	Julie Raque Adams
Health and Services	Stephen Meredith	Donald Douglas
Judiciary	Whitney Westerfield	Phillip Wheeler
Licensing and Occupations	John Schickel	Michael J. Nemes
Natural Resources and Energy	Brandon Smith	Johnnie Turner
Rules	Robert Stivers	none
State and Local Government	Robby Mills	Michael J. Nemes
Transportation	Jimmy Higdon	Brandon J. Storm
Veterans, Military Affairs, and Public Protection	Rick Girdler	Matthew Deneen

=== House of Representatives committees ===
Committee	Chair	Vice Chair(s)
Agriculture	Richard Heath	Daniel Fister
Appropriations and Revenue	Jason Petrie	Adam Bowling and Josh Bray
Banking and Insurance	Michael Meredith	Matt Lockett and Michael Pollock
Committee on Committees	David Osborne	David Meade
Economic Development and Workforce Investment	Josh Branscum	Thomas Huff
Education	James Tipton	Shane Baker and Timmy Truett
Elections, Const. Amendments, and Intergovernmental Affairs	Kevin Bratcher	Josh Calloway
Enrollment	Thomas Huff	none
Families and Children	Samara Heavrin	Steve Riley
Health Services	Kimberly Poore Moser	Ryan Dotson
Judiciary	Daniel Elliott	Jennifer Decker
Licensing, Occupations, and Administrative Regulations	Matthew Koch	Tom Smith
Local Government	Randy Bridges	Ken Fleming
Natural Resources and Energy	Jim Gooch Jr.	Bill Wesley and Richard White
Rules	David Osborne	David Meade
Small Business and Information Technology	Phillip Pratt	William Lawrence
State Government	David Hale	Mary Beth Imes
Tourism and Outdoor Recreation	Kim King	Shawn McPherson
Transportation	John Blanton	Jonathan Dixon
Veterans, Military Affairs, and Public Protection	Walker Thomas	Scott Sharp

== See also ==
- 2022 Kentucky elections (elections leading to this session)
  - 2022 Kentucky Senate election
  - 2022 Kentucky House of Representatives election
- List of Kentucky General Assemblies
