= 2021 Kentucky General Assembly =

2021 session of the Kentucky General Assembly
←	2020	2022	→
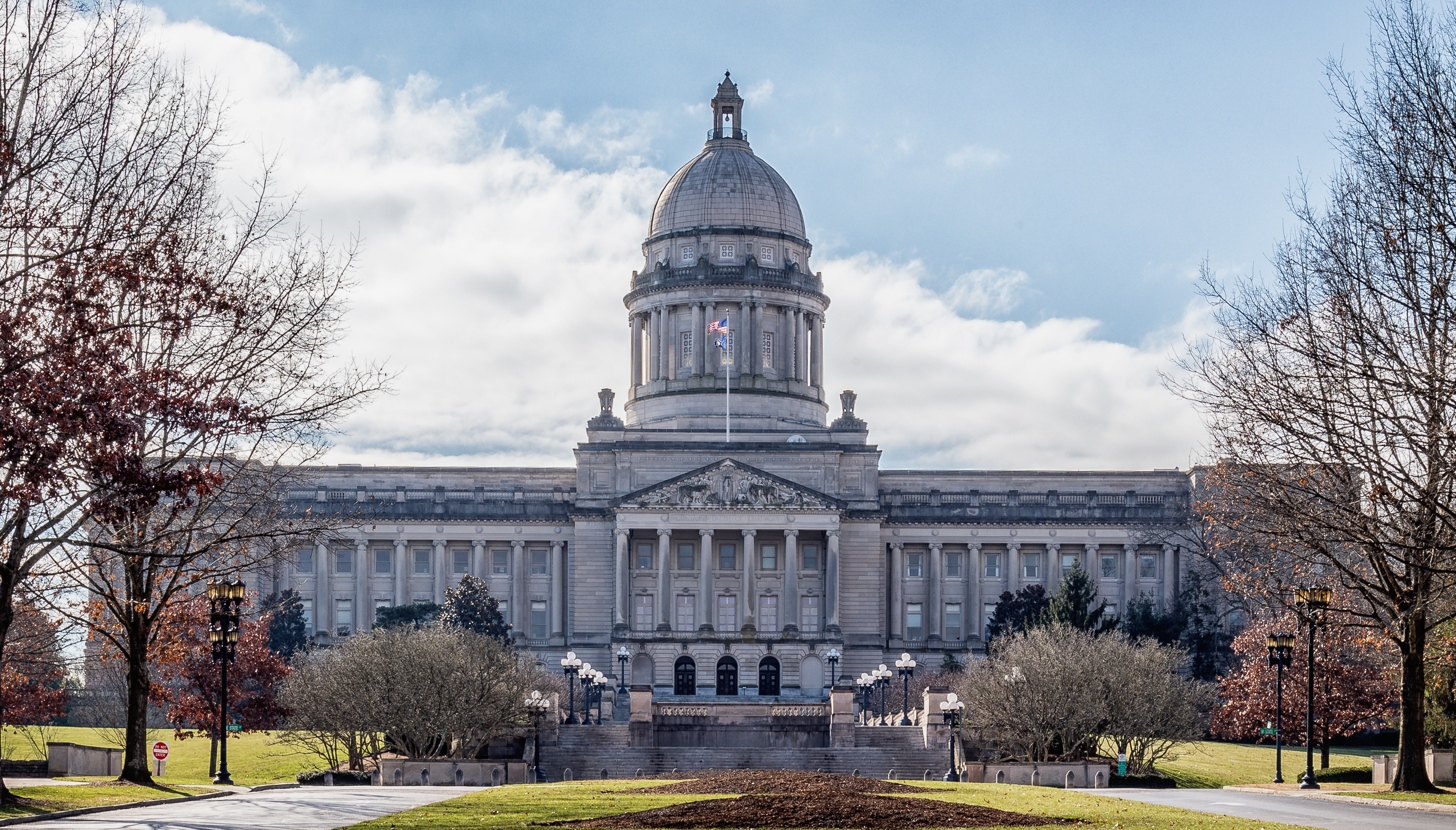
- The Kentucky State Capitol in 2016

Overview
- Legislative body: Kentucky General Assembly
- Jurisdiction: Kentucky

Senate
- Members: 38
- President: Robert Stivers (R–25th); Jan. 8, 2013 - present
- Majority leader: Damon Thayer (R–17th); Jan. 8, 2013 - Jan. 1, 2025
- Minority Leader: Morgan McGarvey (D–19th); Jan. 8, 2019 - Jan. 2, 2023
- Party control: Republican

House of Representatives
- Members: 100
- Speaker: David Osborne (R–59th); Jan. 8, 2019 - present
- Minority Leader: Joni Jenkins (D–44th); Jan. 7, 2020 - Jan. 1, 2023
- Party control: Republican

Sessions
- Regular: January 5, 2021 – March 30, 2021
- Extra.: September 7, 2021 – September 9, 2021

The 2021 Kentucky General Assembly was a meeting of the Kentucky General Assembly, composed of the Kentucky Senate and the Kentucky House of Representatives. It convened in Frankfort on January 5, 2021, and adjourned sine die on March 30, 2021. It was the second regular session of the legislature during the tenure of governor Andy Beshear. The legislature convened again in September 2021 for an extraordinary session.

Republicans maintained their majorities in both chambers following the 2020 elections for the senate and the house.

During this session, the General Assembly approved two constitutional amendments that were voted on in November 2022, including the No Right to Abortion Amendment.

== Major legislation ==
=== Enacted ===
House bills

- HB 4: 2022 Kentucky Amendment 1: An act proposing to amend the Constitution of Kentucky relating to sessions of the General Assembly (Note: Amendments to the Constitution of Kentucky require a 3/5 majority in both houses of the legislature and a majority vote by referendum. They can not be vetoed by the governor.)
- HB 91: 2022 Kentucky Amendment 2: An act proposing an amendment to the Constitution of Kentucky relating to abortion

== Party summary ==
=== Senate ===
Overview of Senate membership by party
	Party (shading shows control)		Total	Vacant
	Democratic	Republican	Total	Vacant
End of previous session	9	29	38	0
Begin (January 5, 2021)	8	30	38	0
Final voting share	21.1%	78.9%		
Extra. session	8	29	37	1
Beginning of the next session	8	30	38	0

=== House of Representatives ===
Overview of House membership by party
	Party (shading shows control)		Total	Vacant
	Democratic	Republican	Total	Vacant
End of previous session	38	62	100	0
Begin (January 5, 2021)	25	75	100	0
Final voting share	25.0%	75.0%		
Extra. session	25	73	98	2
Beginning of the next session	24	75	99	1

== Leadership ==
=== Senate ===
==== Presiding ====
- President: Robert Stivers (R)
- President pro tempore: David P. Givens (R)

==== Majority (Republican) ====
- Majority Leader: Damon Thayer
- Majority Whip: Mike Wilson
- Majority Caucus Chair: Julie Raque Adams

==== Minority (Democratic) ====
- Minority Leader: Morgan McGarvey
- Minority Whip: Dennis Parrett
- Minority Caucus Chair: Reggie Thomas

=== House of Representatives ===
==== Presiding ====
- Speaker: David Osborne (R)
- Speaker pro tempore: David Meade (R)

==== Majority (Republican) ====
- Majority Leader: Steven Rudy
- Majority Whip: Chad McCoy
- Majority Caucus Chair: Suzanne Miles

==== Minority (Democratic) ====
- Minority Leader: Joni Jenkins
- Minority Whip: Angie Hatton
- Minority Caucus Chair: Derrick Graham

== Extraordinary session ==
The legislature was convened by governor Andy Beshear from September 7 to 9 following a ruling of the Kentucky Supreme Court that his state of emergency regarding the COVID-19 pandemic required the approval of the legislature. The General Assembly approved the state of emergency, but banned Beshear from instituting mask mandates.

== Members ==
=== Senate ===
Senators in odd-numbered districts were elected in 2020, while senators in even-numbered districts were elected in 2018.

▌1. Jason Howell (R)
▌2. Danny Carroll (R)
▌3. Whitney Westerfield (R)
▌4. Robby Mills (R)
▌5. Stephen Meredith (R)
▌6. C. B. Embry (R)
▌7. Adrienne Southworth (R)
▌8. Matt Castlen (R)
▌9. David P. Givens (R)
▌10. Dennis Parrett (D)
▌11. John Schickel (R)
▌12. Alice Forgy Kerr (R)
▌13. Reggie Thomas (D)
▌14. Jimmy Higdon (R)
▌15. Rick Girdler (R)
▌16. Max Wise (R)
▌17. Damon Thayer (R)
▌18. Robin L. Webb (D)
▌19. Morgan McGarvey (D)

▌20. Paul Hornback (R)
▌21. Brandon J. Storm (R)
▌22. Tom Buford (R) (regular session)
▌23. Christian McDaniel (R)
▌24. Wil Schroder (R)
▌25. Robert Stivers (R)
▌26. Karen Berg (D)
▌27. Steve West (R)
▌28. Ralph Alvarado (R)
▌29. Johnnie Turner (R)
▌30. Brandon Smith (R)
▌31. Phillip Wheeler (R)
▌32. Mike Wilson (R)
▌33. Gerald Neal (D)
▌34. Jared Carpenter (R)
▌35. Denise Harper Angel (D)
▌36. Julie Raque Adams (R)
▌37. David Yates (D)
▌38. Michael J. Nemes (R)

Senate composition by district Held by Democrats Held by Republicans

=== House of Representatives ===
All 100 house districts were last up for election in 2020.

▌1. Steven Rudy (R)
▌2. Richard Heath (R)
▌3. Randy Bridges (R)
▌4. Lynn Bechler (R)
▌5. Mary Beth Imes (R)
▌6. Chris Freeland (R)
▌7. Suzanne Miles (R)
▌8. Walker Thomas (R)
▌9. Myron Dossett (R)
▌10. Josh Calloway (R)
▌11. Jonathan Dixon (R)
▌12. Jim Gooch Jr. (R)
▌13. DJ Johnson (R)
▌14. Scott Lewis (R)
▌15. Melinda Gibbons Prunty (R)
▌16. Jason Petrie (R)
▌17. Steve Sheldon (R)
▌18. Samara Heavrin (R)
▌19. Michael Meredith (R)
▌20. Patti Minter (D)
▌21. Bart Rowland (R)
▌22. Shawn McPherson (R)
▌23. Steve Riley (R)
▌24. Brandon Reed (R)
▌25. Jim DuPlessis (R)
▌26. Russell Webber (R)
▌27. Nancy Tate (R)
▌28. Charles Miller (D)
▌29. Kevin Bratcher (R)
▌30. Tom Burch (D)
▌31. Josie Raymond (D)
▌32. Tina Bojanowski (D)
▌33. Jason Nemes (R)
▌34. Mary Lou Marzian (D)
▌35. Lisa Willner (D)
▌36. Jerry T. Miller (R)
▌37. Jeffery Donohue (D)
▌38. McKenzie Cantrell (D)
▌39. Matt Lockett (R)
▌40. Nima Kulkarni (D)
▌41. Attica Scott (D)
▌42. Reginald Meeks (D)
▌43. Pamela Stevenson (D)
▌44. Joni Jenkins (D)
▌45. Killian Timoney (R)
▌46. Al Gentry (D)
▌47. Felicia Rabourn (R)
▌48. Ken Fleming (R)
▌49. Thomas Huff (R)
▌50. Chad McCoy (R)

▌51. John Carney (R) (regular session)
▌52. Ken Upchurch (R)
▌53. James Tipton (R)
▌54. Daniel Elliott (R)
▌55. Kim King (R)
▌56. Daniel Fister (R)
▌57. Derrick Graham (D)
▌58. Jennifer Decker (R)
▌59. David Osborne (R)
▌60. Sal Santoro (R)
▌61. Savannah Maddox (R)
▌62. Phillip Pratt (R)
▌63. Kim Banta (R)
▌64. Kimberly Poore Moser (R)
▌65. Buddy Wheatley (D)
▌66. C. Ed Massey (R)
▌67. Rachel Roberts (D)
▌68. Joseph Fischer (R)
▌69. Adam Koenig (R)
▌70. William Lawrence (R)
▌71. Josh Bray (R)
▌72. Matthew Koch (R)
▌73. Ryan Dotson (R)
▌74. David Hale (R)
▌75. Kelly Flood (D)
▌76. Ruth Ann Palumbo (D)
▌77. George Brown Jr. (D)
▌78. Mark Hart (R)
▌79. Susan Westrom (D)
▌80. David Meade (R)
▌81. Deanna Frazier (R)
▌82. Regina Bunch (R)
▌83. Josh Branscum (R)
▌84. Chris Fugate (R)
▌85. Shane Baker (R)
▌86. Tom Smith (R)
▌87. Adam Bowling (R)
▌88. Cherlynn Stevenson (D)
▌89. Robert Goforth (R) (regular session)
▌90. Derek Lewis (R)
▌91. Bill Wesley (R)
▌92. John Blanton (R)
▌93. Norma Kirk-McCormick (R)
▌94. Angie Hatton (D)
▌95. Ashley Tackett Laferty (D)
▌96. Patrick Flannery (R)
▌97. Bobby McCool (R)
▌98. Danny Bentley (R)
▌99. Richard White (R)
▌100. Scott Sharp (R)

House composition by district Held by Democrats Held by Republicans

== Changes in membership ==
=== Senate changes ===
Senate changes
State (class)	Vacated by	Reason for change	Successor	Date of successor's formal installation (Note: When seated or oath administered, not necessarily when service began.)
22	Tom Buford (R)	Incumbent died July 6, 2021. A special election was held November 2, 2021.	Vacant until the next session	

=== House of Representatives changes ===
House changes
District	Vacated by	Reason for change	Successor	Date of successor's formal installation
51	John Carney (R)	Incumbent died July 17, 2021. A special election was held November 2, 2021.	Vacant until the next session	
89	Robert Goforth (R)	Incumbent resigned August 24, 2021. A special election was held November 2, 2021.	Vacant until the next session	

== Committees ==
=== Senate committees ===
Committee	Chair	Vice Chair
Agriculture	Paul Hornback	Matt Castlen
Appropriations and Revenue	Christian McDaniel	none
Banking and Insurance	Jared Carpenter	Rick Girdler
Committee on Committees	Robert Stivers	none
Economic Development, Tourism, and Labor	Wil Schroder	Phillip Wheeler
Education	Max Wise	Steve West
Enrollment	Brandon J. Storm	none
Health and Services	Ralph Alvarado	Stephen Meredith
Judiciary	Whitney Westerfield	Danny Carroll
Licensing and Occupations	John Schickel	Jason Howell
Natural Resources and Energy	Brandon Smith	Johnnie Turner
Rules	Robert Stivers	none
State and Local Government	Robby Mills	Michael J. Nemes
Transportation	Jimmy Higdon	Brandon J. Storm
Veterans, Military Affairs, and Public Protection	C. B. Embry	Stephen Meredith

=== House of Representatives committees ===
Committee	Chair	Vice Chair(s)
Agriculture	Richard Heath	Mark Hart
Appropriations and Revenue	Jason Petrie	Brandon Reed
Banking and Insurance	Bart Rowland	Derek Lewis
Committee on Committees	David Osborne	David Meade
Economic Development and Workforce Investment	Russell Webber	Daniel Elliott
Education	Regina Bunch	John Carney and Steve Riley
Elections, Const. Amendments, and Intergovernmental Affairs	Kevin Bratcher	Scott Lewis
Enrollment	David Hale	none
Health Services	Kimberly Poore Moser	Melinda Gibbons Prunty
Judiciary	C. Ed Massey	Kim Banta
Licensing, Occupations, and Administrative Regulations	Adam Koenig	Matthew Koch
Local Government	Michael Meredith	Deanna Frazier
Natural Resources and Energy	Jim Gooch Jr.	Richard White
Rules	David Osborne	David Meade
Small Business and Information Technology	Phillip Pratt	Chris Freeland
State Government	Jerry T. Miller	Adam Bowling and Kevin Bratcher
Tourism and Outdoor Recreation	Kim King	Chris Fugate
Transportation	Ken Upchurch	Randy Bridges
Veterans, Military Affairs, and Public Protection	Walker Thomas	Bobby McCool

== See also ==
- 2020 Kentucky elections (elections leading to this session)
  - 2020 Kentucky Senate election
  - 2020 Kentucky House of Representatives election
- List of Kentucky General Assemblies
