= 2022 Kentucky General Assembly =

2022 session of the Kentucky General Assembly
←	2021	2023	→
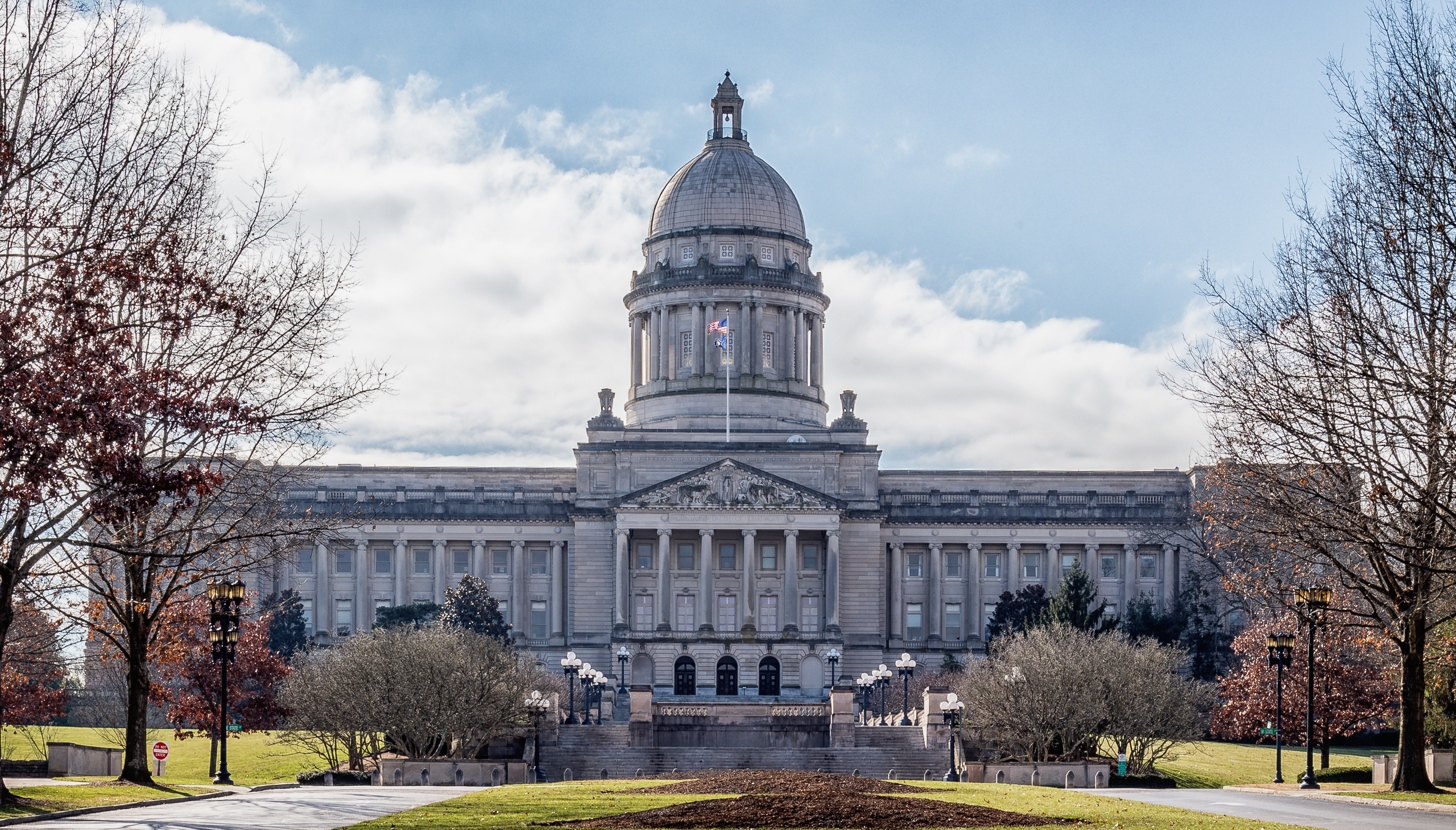
- The Kentucky State Capitol in 2016

Overview
- Legislative body: Kentucky General Assembly
- Jurisdiction: Kentucky

Senate
- Members: 38
- President: Robert Stivers (R–25th); Jan. 8, 2013 - present
- Majority leader: Damon Thayer (R–17th); Jan. 8, 2013 - Jan. 1, 2025
- Minority Leader: Morgan McGarvey (D–19th); Jan. 8, 2019 - Jan. 2, 2023
- Party control: Republican

House of Representatives
- Members: 100
- Speaker: David Osborne (R–59th); Jan. 8, 2019 - present
- Minority Leader: Joni Jenkins (D–44th); Jan. 7, 2020 - Jan. 1, 2023
- Party control: Republican

Sessions
- Regular: January 4, 2022 – April 14, 2022
- Extra.: August 24, 2022 – August 26, 2022

The 2022 Kentucky General Assembly was a meeting of the Kentucky General Assembly, composed of the Kentucky Senate and the Kentucky House of Representatives. It convened in Frankfort on January 4, 2022, and adjourned sine die on April 14, 2022. It was the third regular session of the legislature during the tenure of governor Andy Beshear. The legislature convened again in August 2022 for an extraordinary session.

Republicans maintained their majorities in both chambers following the 2020 elections for the senate and the house.

== Party summary ==
=== Senate ===
Overview of Senate membership by party
	Party (shading shows control)		Total	Vacant
	Democratic	Republican	Total	Vacant
End of previous session	8	30	38	0
Begin (January 4, 2022)	8	30	38	0
Final voting share	21.1%	78.9%		
Extra. session	8	30	38	0
Beginning of the next session	6	31	37	1

=== House of Representatives ===
Overview of House membership by party
	Party (shading shows control)		Total	Vacant
	Democratic	Republican	Total	Vacant
End of previous session	25	75	100	0
Begin (January 4, 2022)	24	75	99	1
February 28, 2022	25	75	100	0
Final voting share	25.0%	75.0%		
Extra. session	25	75	100	0
Beginning of the next session	20	80	100	0

== Leadership ==
=== Senate ===
==== Presiding ====
- President: Robert Stivers (R)
- President pro tempore: David P. Givens (R)

==== Majority (Republican) ====
- Majority Leader: Damon Thayer
- Majority Whip: Mike Wilson
- Majority Caucus Chair: Julie Raque Adams

==== Minority (Democratic) ====
- Minority Leader: Morgan McGarvey
- Minority Whip: Dennis Parrett
- Minority Caucus Chair: Reggie Thomas

=== House of Representatives ===
==== Presiding ====
- Speaker: David Osborne (R)
- Speaker pro tempore: David Meade (R)

==== Majority (Republican) ====
- Majority Leader: Steven Rudy
- Majority Whip: Chad McCoy
- Majority Caucus Chair: Suzanne Miles

==== Minority (Democratic) ====
- Minority Leader: Joni Jenkins
- Minority Whip: Angie Hatton
- Minority Caucus Chair: Derrick Graham

== Extraordinary session ==
The legislature was convened by governor Andy Beshear from August 24 to 26 to address flooding that had occurred in eastern Kentucky. A relief package totaling $213 million was approved.

== Members ==
=== Senate ===
Senators in odd-numbered districts were elected in 2020, while senators in even-numbered districts were elected in 2018.

▌1. Jason Howell (R)
▌2. Danny Carroll (R)
▌3. Whitney Westerfield (R)
▌4. Robby Mills (R)
▌5. Stephen Meredith (R)
▌6. C. B. Embry (R)
▌7. Adrienne Southworth (R)
▌8. Matt Castlen (R)
▌9. David P. Givens (R)
▌10. Dennis Parrett (D)
▌11. John Schickel (R)
▌12. Alice Forgy Kerr (R)
▌13. Reggie Thomas (D)
▌14. Jimmy Higdon (R)
▌15. Rick Girdler (R)
▌16. Max Wise (R)
▌17. Damon Thayer (R)
▌18. Robin L. Webb (D)
▌19. Morgan McGarvey (D)

▌20. Paul Hornback (R)
▌21. Brandon J. Storm (R)
▌22. Donald Douglas (R)
▌23. Christian McDaniel (R)
▌24. Wil Schroder (R)
▌25. Robert Stivers (R)
▌26. Karen Berg (D)
▌27. Steve West (R)
▌28. Ralph Alvarado (R)
▌29. Johnnie Turner (R)
▌30. Brandon Smith (R)
▌31. Phillip Wheeler (R)
▌32. Mike Wilson (R)
▌33. Gerald Neal (D)
▌34. Jared Carpenter (R)
▌35. Denise Harper Angel (D)
▌36. Julie Raque Adams (R)
▌37. David Yates (D)
▌38. Michael J. Nemes (R)

Senate composition by district Held by Democrats Held by Republicans

=== House of Representatives ===
All 100 house districts were last up for election in 2020.

▌1. Steven Rudy (R)
▌2. Richard Heath (R)
▌3. Randy Bridges (R)
▌4. Lynn Bechler (R)
▌5. Mary Beth Imes (R)
▌6. Chris Freeland (R)
▌7. Suzanne Miles (R)
▌8. Walker Thomas (R)
▌9. Myron Dossett (R)
▌10. Josh Calloway (R)
▌11. Jonathan Dixon (R)
▌12. Jim Gooch Jr. (R)
▌13. DJ Johnson (R)
▌14. Scott Lewis (R)
▌15. Melinda Gibbons Prunty (R)
▌16. Jason Petrie (R)
▌17. Steve Sheldon (R)
▌18. Samara Heavrin (R)
▌19. Michael Meredith (R)
▌20. Patti Minter (D)
▌21. Bart Rowland (R)
▌22. Shawn McPherson (R)
▌23. Steve Riley (R)
▌24. Brandon Reed (R)
▌25. Jim DuPlessis (R)
▌26. Russell Webber (R)
▌27. Nancy Tate (R)
▌28. Charles Miller (D)
▌29. Kevin Bratcher (R)
▌30. Tom Burch (D)
▌31. Josie Raymond (D)
▌32. Tina Bojanowski (D)
▌33. Jason Nemes (R)
▌34. Mary Lou Marzian (D)
▌35. Lisa Willner (D)
▌36. Jerry T. Miller (R)
▌37. Jeffery Donohue (D)
▌38. McKenzie Cantrell (D)
▌39. Matt Lockett (R)
▌40. Nima Kulkarni (D)
▌41. Attica Scott (D)
▌42. Keturah Herron (D) (from February 28)
▌43. Pamela Stevenson (D)
▌44. Joni Jenkins (D)
▌45. Killian Timoney (R)
▌46. Al Gentry (D)
▌47. Felicia Rabourn (R)
▌48. Ken Fleming (R)
▌49. Thomas Huff (R)
▌50. Chad McCoy (R)

▌51. Michael Pollock (R)
▌52. Ken Upchurch (R)
▌53. James Tipton (R)
▌54. Daniel Elliott (R)
▌55. Kim King (R)
▌56. Daniel Fister (R)
▌57. Derrick Graham (D)
▌58. Jennifer Decker (R)
▌59. David Osborne (R)
▌60. Sal Santoro (R)
▌61. Savannah Maddox (R)
▌62. Phillip Pratt (R)
▌63. Kim Banta (R)
▌64. Kimberly Poore Moser (R)
▌65. Buddy Wheatley (D)
▌66. C. Ed Massey (R)
▌67. Rachel Roberts (D)
▌68. Joseph Fischer (R)
▌69. Adam Koenig (R)
▌70. William Lawrence (R)
▌71. Josh Bray (R)
▌72. Matthew Koch (R)
▌73. Ryan Dotson (R)
▌74. David Hale (R)
▌75. Kelly Flood (D)
▌76. Ruth Ann Palumbo (D)
▌77. George Brown Jr. (D)
▌78. Mark Hart (R)
▌79. Susan Westrom (D)
▌80. David Meade (R)
▌81. Deanna Frazier (R)
▌82. Regina Bunch (R)
▌83. Josh Branscum (R)
▌84. Chris Fugate (R)
▌85. Shane Baker (R)
▌86. Tom Smith (R)
▌87. Adam Bowling (R)
▌88. Cherlynn Stevenson (D)
▌89. Timmy Truett (R)
▌90. Derek Lewis (R)
▌91. Bill Wesley (R)
▌92. John Blanton (R)
▌93. Norma Kirk-McCormick (R)
▌94. Angie Hatton (D)
▌95. Ashley Tackett Laferty (D)
▌96. Patrick Flannery (R)
▌97. Bobby McCool (R)
▌98. Danny Bentley (R)
▌99. Richard White (R)
▌100. Scott Sharp (R)

House composition by district Held by Democrats Held by Republicans

== Changes in membership ==
=== Senate changes ===
There were no changes in Senate membership during this session.

=== House of Representatives changes ===
House changes
District	Vacated by	Reason for change	Successor	Date of successor's formal installation (Note: When seated or oath administered, not necessarily when service began.)
42	Vacant	Incumbent Reginald Meeks (D) resigned before the beginning of this session. A special election was held February 22, 2022.	Keturah Herron (D)	February 28, 2022

== Committees ==
=== Senate committees ===
Committee	Chair	Vice Chair
Agriculture	Paul Hornback	Matt Castlen
Appropriations and Revenue	Christian McDaniel	none
Banking and Insurance	Jared Carpenter	Rick Girdler
Committee on Committees	Robert Stivers	none
Economic Development, Tourism, and Labor	Wil Schroder	Phillip Wheeler
Education	Max Wise	Steve West
Enrollment	Brandon J. Storm	none
Health and Services	Ralph Alvarado	Stephen Meredith
Judiciary	Whitney Westerfield	Danny Carroll
Licensing and Occupations	John Schickel	Jason Howell
Natural Resources and Energy	Brandon Smith	Johnnie Turner
Rules	Robert Stivers	none
State and Local Government	Robby Mills	Michael J. Nemes
Transportation	Jimmy Higdon	Brandon J. Storm
Veterans, Military Affairs, and Public Protection	C. B. Embry	Stephen Meredith

=== House of Representatives committees ===
Committee	Chair	Vice Chair(s)
Agriculture	Richard Heath	Mark Hart
Appropriations and Revenue	Jason Petrie	Brandon Reed
Banking and Insurance	Bart Rowland	Derek Lewis
Committee on Committees	David Osborne	David Meade
Economic Development and Workforce Investment	Russell Webber	Daniel Elliott
Education	Regina Bunch	Steve Riley
Elections, Const. Amendments, and Intergovermental Affairs	Kevin Bratcher	Scott Lewis
Enrollment	David Hale	none
Health Services	Kimberly Poore Moser	Melinda Gibbons Prunty
Judiciary	C. Ed Massey	Kim Banta
Licensing, Occupations, and Administrative Regulations	Adam Koenig	Matthew Koch
Local Government	Michael Meredith	Deanna Frazier
Natural Resources and Energy	Jim Gooch Jr.	Richard White
Rules	David Osborne	David Meade
Small Business and Information Technology	Phillip Pratt	Chris Freeland
State Government	Jerry T. Miller	Adam Bowling and Kevin Bratcher
Tourism and Outdoor Recreation	Kim King	Chris Fugate
Transportation	Ken Upchurch	Randy Bridges
Veterans, Military Affairs, and Public Protection	Walker Thomas	Bobby McCool

== See also ==
- 2020 Kentucky elections (elections leading to this session)
  - 2020 Kentucky Senate election
  - 2020 Kentucky House of Representatives election
- List of Kentucky General Assemblies
