= Virgil Moore =

American politician (born 1933)

Virgil C. Moore

Member of the Kentucky Senate from the 5th district
- In office January 1, 1993 – January 1, 2005
- Preceded by: Joe Wright
- Succeeded by: Carroll Gibson

Personal details
- Born: Barbourville, Kentucky, U.S.
- Party: Republican
- Education: Eastern Kentucky University

Virgil C. Moore (born December 4, 1933) was a member of the Kentucky Senate from 1993 to 2005 representing the state's 5th Senatorial district. In 2003, he ran for the Republican nomination for Governor of Kentucky. He resides in Leitchfield, Kentucky.

== Pre-politics ==
Moore was born near Barbourville, Kentucky and grew up in The Baughman area of rural Knox County. He graduated from Eastern Kentucky University with a Bachelor of Science degree in mathematics in 1961 and attended the U.S. Army’s Career Officers School in 1961 and the Joint Service, Air/Ground Operations School in 1971. Moore served in the army for 21 years before retiring as a major. After retirement he spent time farming and as president of Quality Wood Preserving Inc.

== Local politics ==
Moore served as the chairman of the Grayson County Republican Party from 1982 to 1990. He also served as a campaign co-chair for Republican congressional candidates in 1984, 1988, and 1990.

== State Senate campaigns ==
Moore was first elected to the state Senate in 1992. He was nominated by Republican officials in the 5th Senatorial District to replace state Rep. Ronny Layman of Leitchfield, who resigned after pleading guilty to accepting a bribe in the Boptrot sting conducted by the FBI. He defeated former State Auditor Mary Ann Tobin in the general election, 17,580 to 14,990, getting almost half his margin from the Democrat's home Breckinridge County (3,976 to 2,717). The district comprised precincts in Breckinridge, Grayson, Hart, Larue, Meade, and Ohio counties. In 1996 he defeated Joe Hager of Meade County in the general election by less than a thousand votes after not having a primary challenger. Before the election, the precincts in Larue County were moved to another district. In 2000 he defeated Bill Corum of Meade County with almost 56 percent of the vote in the general election. In 2004 Moore lost to Carroll Gibson in the Republican primary winning only 36 percent of the vote. By this time the precincts in Ohio county had been removed but precincts in Larue and Hancock counties had been added.

While in the senate he served on the Tobacco Task Force and was chairman of the Transportation Committee.

A 1998 survey by the Kentucky Center for Public Issues rated Moore as the least effective legislator in the senate.

== 2003 Gubernatorial race ==
Moore sought the Republican nomination for governor in 2003. His running mate for lieutenant governor was Don Bell of Oldham County. He finished a distant fourth in the primary winning only 1.5 percent of the vote in the election won by Ernie Fletcher. Fletcher won the governorship in the general election.
