= Kentucky's 12th House of Representatives district =

American legislative district

Kentucky's 12th State House of Representatives district
Representative
Jim Gooch Jr. R–Providence
since January 1, 1995
- Registration: 47.5% Republican; 45.0% Democratic; 7.1% No party preference
- Demographics: 90.5% White; 3.9% Black; 3.3% Hispanic; 0.2% Asian; 0.1% Native American; 0.1% Hawaiian/Pacific Islander; 0.1% Other; 1.9% Multiracial
- Population (2023): 44,351
- Registered voters (2025): 32,420

Kentucky's 12th House of Representatives district is one of 100 districts in the Kentucky House of Representatives. Located in the western part of the state, it comprises the counties of Crittenden, McLean, Union, and Webster. It has been represented by Jim Gooch Jr. (R–Providence) since 1995. As of 2023, the district had a population of 44,351.

== Voter registration ==
On January 1, 2025, the district had 32,420 registered voters, who were registered with the following parties.

Party	Registration	
Party	Voters	%
Republican	15,385	47.46
Democratic	14,597	45.02
Independent	899	2.77
Libertarian	99	0.31
Constitution	17	0.05
Green	12	0.04
Socialist Workers	2	0.01
Reform	1	0.00
"Other"	1,408	4.34
Total	32,420	100.00
Source: Kentucky State Board of Elections

== List of members representing the district ==
Member	Party	Years	Electoral history	District location
Dorsey Ridley (Dixon)	Democratic	January 1, 1987 – January 1, 1995	Elected in 1986. Reelected in 1988. Reelected in 1990. Reelected in 1992. Retired.	1985–1993; Caldwell (part), Crittenden (part), Hopkins (part), McLean (part), and Webster Counties.
Dorsey Ridley (Dixon)	Democratic	January 1, 1987 – January 1, 1995	Elected in 1986. Reelected in 1988. Reelected in 1990. Reelected in 1992. Retired.	1993–1997; Caldwell (part), Hopkins (part), McLean (part), and Webster Counties.
Jim Gooch Jr. (Providence)	Democratic	January 1, 1995 – December 28, 2015	Elected in 1994. Reelected in 1996. Reelected in 1998. Reelected in 2000. Reelected in 2002. Reelected in 2004. Reelected in 2006. Reelected in 2008. Reelected in 2010. Reelected in 2012. Reelected in 2014. Reelected in 2016. Reelected in 2018. Reelected in 2020. Reelected in 2022. Reelected in 2024. Reelected in 2026.	1993–1997; Caldwell (part), Hopkins (part), McLean (part), and Webster Counties.
Jim Gooch Jr. (Providence)	Democratic	January 1, 1995 – December 28, 2015	Elected in 1994. Reelected in 1996. Reelected in 1998. Reelected in 2000. Reelected in 2002. Reelected in 2004. Reelected in 2006. Reelected in 2008. Reelected in 2010. Reelected in 2012. Reelected in 2014. Reelected in 2016. Reelected in 2018. Reelected in 2020. Reelected in 2022. Reelected in 2024. Reelected in 2026.	1997–2003
Jim Gooch Jr. (Providence)	Democratic	January 1, 1995 – December 28, 2015	Elected in 1994. Reelected in 1996. Reelected in 1998. Reelected in 2000. Reelected in 2002. Reelected in 2004. Reelected in 2006. Reelected in 2008. Reelected in 2010. Reelected in 2012. Reelected in 2014. Reelected in 2016. Reelected in 2018. Reelected in 2020. Reelected in 2022. Reelected in 2024. Reelected in 2026.	2003–2015
Jim Gooch Jr. (Providence)	Democratic	January 1, 1995 – December 28, 2015	Elected in 1994. Reelected in 1996. Reelected in 1998. Reelected in 2000. Reelected in 2002. Reelected in 2004. Reelected in 2006. Reelected in 2008. Reelected in 2010. Reelected in 2012. Reelected in 2014. Reelected in 2016. Reelected in 2018. Reelected in 2020. Reelected in 2022. Reelected in 2024. Reelected in 2026.	2015–2023
Jim Gooch Jr. (Providence)	Republican	December 28, 2015 – present	Elected in 1994. Reelected in 1996. Reelected in 1998. Reelected in 2000. Reelected in 2002. Reelected in 2004. Reelected in 2006. Reelected in 2008. Reelected in 2010. Reelected in 2012. Reelected in 2014. Reelected in 2016. Reelected in 2018. Reelected in 2020. Reelected in 2022. Reelected in 2024. Reelected in 2026.	2015–2023
Jim Gooch Jr. (Providence)	Republican	December 28, 2015 – present	Elected in 1994. Reelected in 1996. Reelected in 1998. Reelected in 2000. Reelected in 2002. Reelected in 2004. Reelected in 2006. Reelected in 2008. Reelected in 2010. Reelected in 2012. Reelected in 2014. Reelected in 2016. Reelected in 2018. Reelected in 2020. Reelected in 2022. Reelected in 2024. Reelected in 2026.	2023–present
