= Carroll Gibson =

American politician

Majority Whip of the Kentucky Senate
- In office January 8, 2008 – January 8, 2013
- Preceded by: Dan Seum
- Succeeded by: Brandon Smith

Member of the Kentucky Senate from the 5th district
- In office January 1, 2005 – January 1, 2017
- Preceded by: Virgil Moore
- Succeeded by: Stephen Meredith

Personal details
- Born: May 26, 1945 (age 81)
- Party: Republican

Carroll Gibson (born May 26, 1945) is an American politician. He was a member of the Kentucky Senate from the 5th District, serving from 2005 to 2017. He is a member of the Republican Party.
