= Danny Ford (politician) =

American politician

Minority Leader of the Kentucky House of Representatives
- In office January 3, 1995 – January 2, 2001
- Preceded by: Tom Jensen
- Succeeded by: Jeff Hoover

Member of the Kentucky House of Representatives from the 80th district
- In office January 1, 1982 – January 1, 2013
- Preceded by: Harold DeMarcus
- Succeeded by: David Meade

Personal details
- Party: Republican

Danny Ray Ford (born April 25, 1952) is an American politician from Kentucky who was a member of the Kentucky House of Representatives from 1982 to 2013. Ford was first elected to the house in 1981 after incumbent representative Harold DeMarcus retired. He did not seek reelection in 2012 and was succeeded by David Meade.
