= Damon Thayer =

American politician

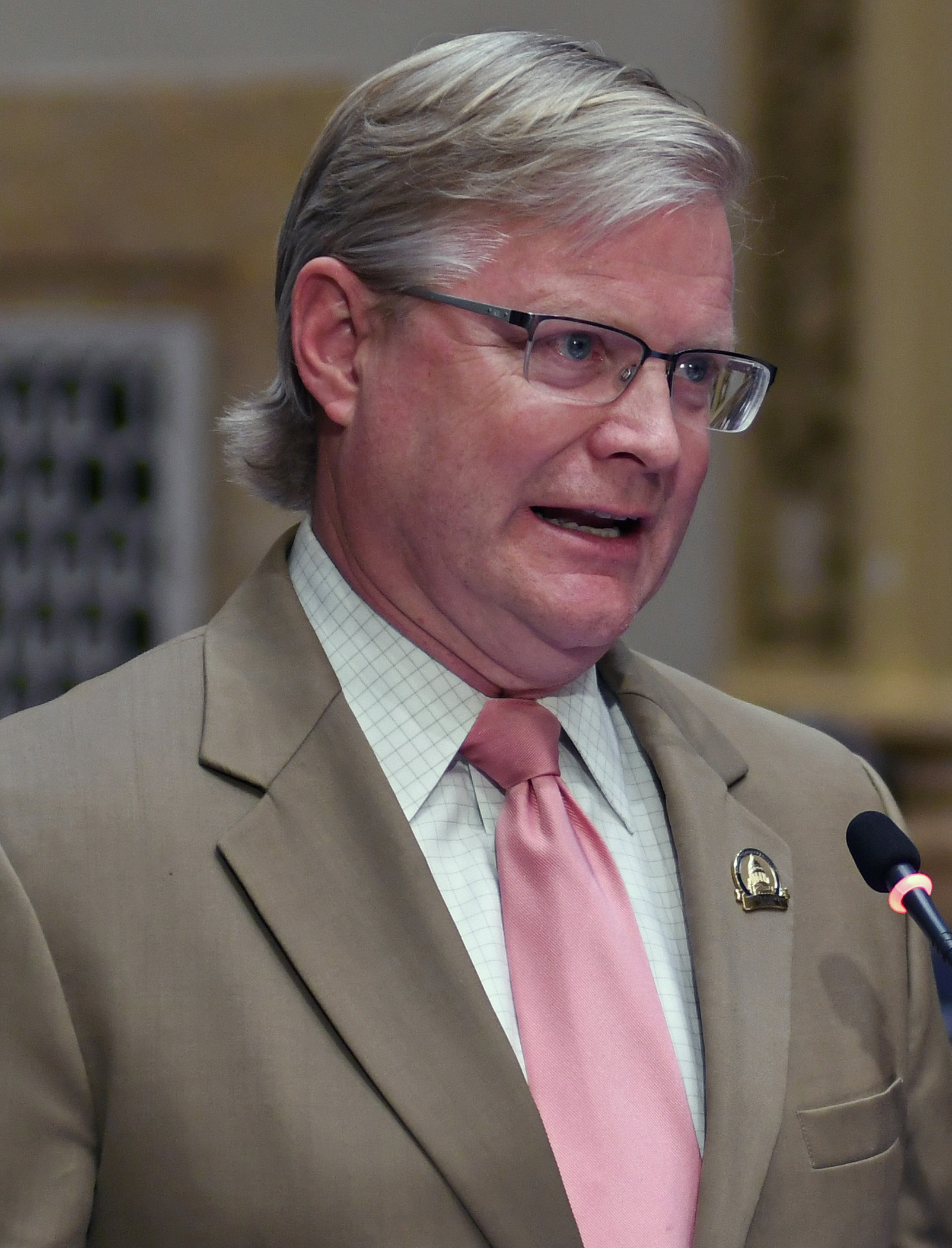
- Thayer in 2022

Majority Leader of the Kentucky Senate
- In office January 8, 2013 – January 1, 2025
- Whip: Brandon Smith; Jimmy Higdon; Mike Wilson
- Preceded by: Robert Stivers
- Succeeded by: Max Wise

Member of the Kentucky Senate from the 17th district
- In office February 4, 2003 – January 1, 2025
- Preceded by: Daniel Mongiardo (redistricting)
- Succeeded by: Matt Nunn

Personal details
- Born: Damon Daniel Thayer; September 16, 1967 (age 58)
- Party: Republican
- Education: Michigan State University (BA)

Damon Daniel Thayer (born September 16, 1967) is an American politician who served as a member of the Kentucky Senate from 2003 to 2025, and as Senate majority leader from 2013 to 2025. A member of the Republican Party, Thayer represented Kentucky's 17th Senate district, which included Grant and Scott counties as well as parts of Fayette and Kenton counties.

== Background ==
Thayer was raised in Grayling, Michigan. He graduated from Michigan State University in 1989 with a Bachelor of Arts degree in communications. He is the owner of Thayer Communications and Consulting LLC, a marketing communications firm. Thayer was vice chairman of the Republican Party of Kentucky from 1999 to 2004.

== Political career ==
In 2003, Thayer was elected to the Kentucky Senate in a special election to represent the 17th District. In 2017, he was selected Senate Majority Floor Leader. As a member of Senate leadership, he serves on the Committee on Committees, the Rules Committee, and the Legislative Research Commission.

He appeared on The Daily Show in 2013.

In March 2020 during the first session of the Kentucky Senate since Democrat Andy Beshear took office as governor, Thayer proposed legislation to limit the powers of the executive branch.

Thayer chose not to seek reelection in 2024, and retired at the end of his term. He has publicly expressed interest in running for governor in 2027.

Kentucky Senate
Preceded by Robert Stivers	Majority Leader of the Kentucky Senate; 2013–2025	Succeeded by Max Wise
