= Savannah Maddox =

American politician (born 1987)

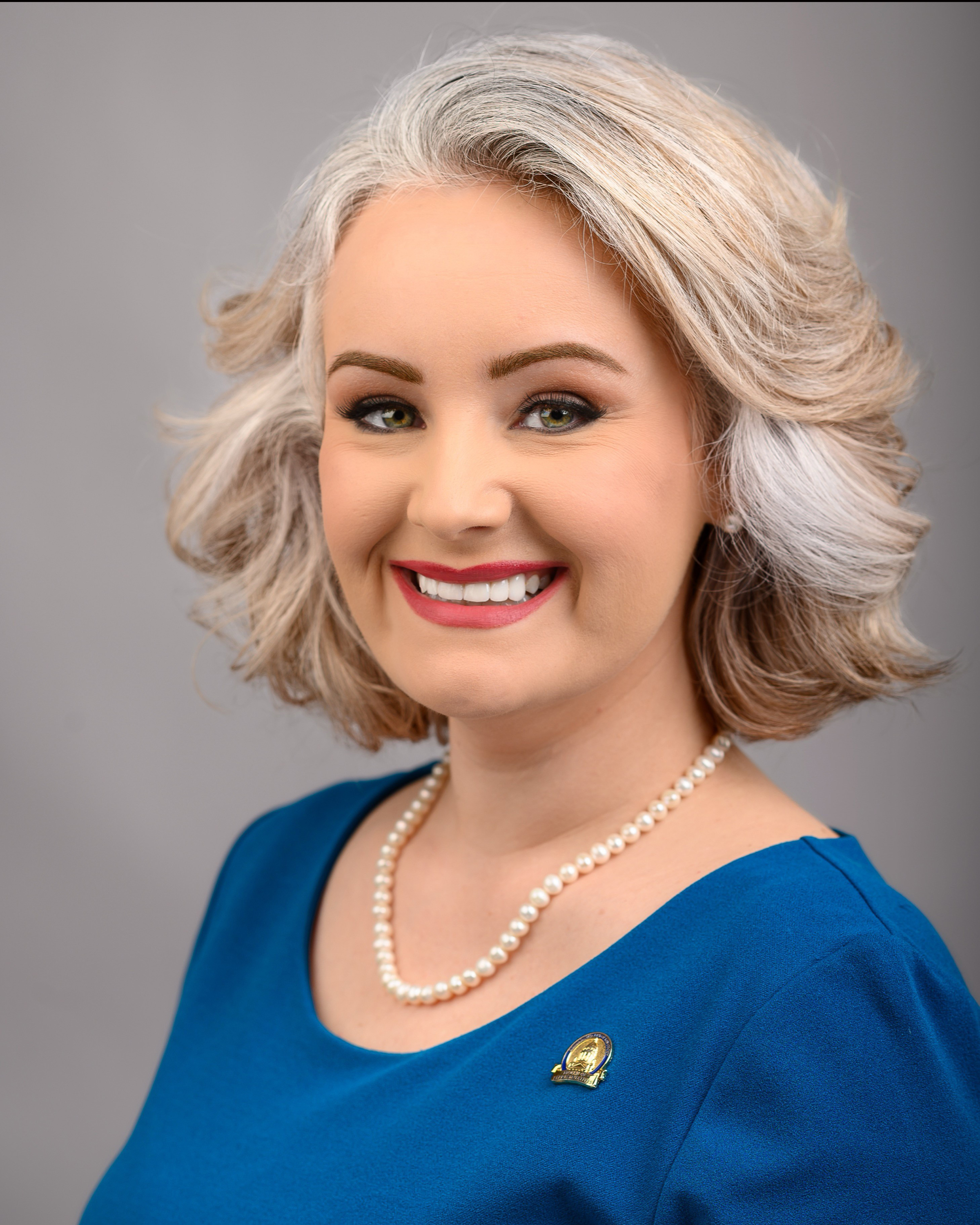
- Official portrait, 2024

Member of the Kentucky House of Representatives from the 61st district
- Incumbent
- Assumed office January 1, 2019
- Preceded by: Brian Linder

Personal details
- Born: November 2, 1987 (age 38) Kentucky, U.S.
- Party: Republican
- Spouse: Eldon Maddox (m. 2008)
- Children: 2
- Education: Northern Kentucky University (BA)
- Website: Campaign website

Savannah Lee Maddox (born November 2, 1987) is an American politician. She is a Republican and represents District 61 containing Grant County, Gallatin County, and parts of Kenton and Boone Counties in the Kentucky House of Representatives. Maddox is viewed as one of the General Assembly's furthest-right members.

== Early life and career ==
Maddox received a Bachelor of Arts in History & International Relations from Northern Kentucky University. After an internship with U.S. Representative Geoff Davis, she worked for the University of Kentucky Cooperative Extension Services. In 2016, Maddox worked on U.S. Senator Rand Paul's reelection campaign.

== Political career ==
=== Kentucky House of Representatives ===
Maddox was first elected to the Kentucky House of Representatives in 2018, when she defeated Grant County Judge-Executive Darrell Link by 5,000 votes (36%) in the general election.

Maddox supported the passage of Senate Bill 150, which legalized constitutional concealed carry for legal gun owners in Kentucky. The bill was endorsed by the National Rifle Association of America, while it was opposed by the Kentucky Fraternal Order of Police, Louisville Metro Police Department, and by the Kentucky Sheriff's Association. It was signed into law in October 2019, and Maddox, along with Governor Matt Bevin, was awarded the .50 Caliber Freedom Award from the National Association for Gun Rights for her work in passing the legislation.

Maddox introduced House Bill 321 in January 2020, which died in committee. It would have made it a felony for a doctor to perform a surgery or prescribe a medication to a minor intending to alter the child's gender.

During the COVID-19 pandemic, Maddox was an opponent of Governor Andy Beshear's emergency orders, calling them acts of "tyranny." She proposed a measure to restrict the governor's ability to enact a state of emergency, but it failed to advance. Beshear said his actions saved lives, and that they reflected guidance from the White House Coronavirus Task Force.

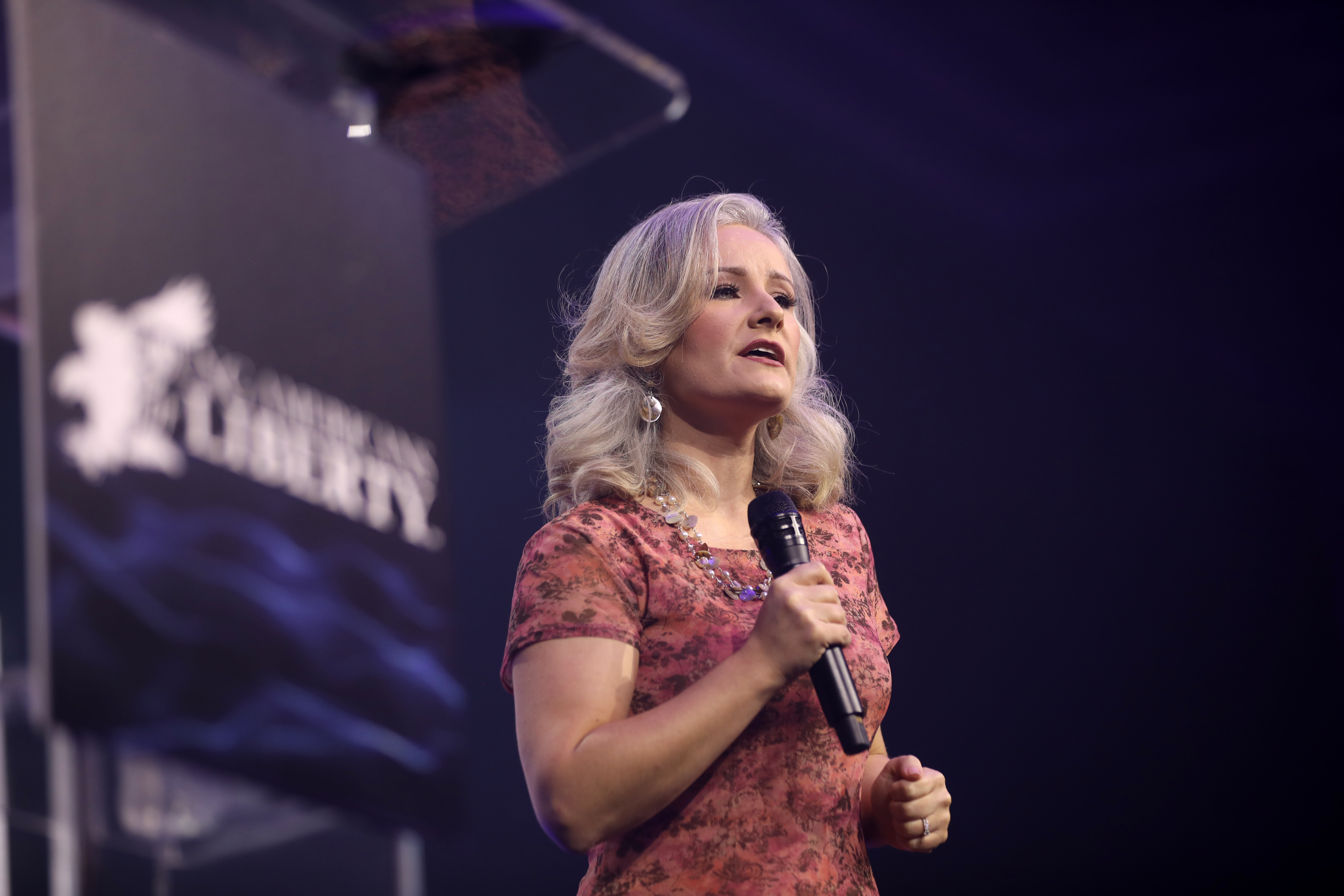
Maddox speaking at the 2024 Young Americans for Liberty National Convention

Maddox's connection to armed militia groups who organized certain protests generated controversy, as did her posting of photos of herself with white supremacists. Kentucky State House Democrats called on Republican leaders to formally censure Maddox after protestors from a local far-right anti-government militia Three Percenters Chapter that she had taken pictures with hung governor Beshear in effigy outside the state capitol in 2020. She had made comments about Beshear after a protest, that she did not personally attend, which the Democrats said encouraged the protestors to escalate their tactics. House Democrats also criticized Maddox for tweets she made in 2014 and 2015 in which she criticized Jews, Muslims, and then-President Barack Obama.

Maddox proposed House Bill 28 in January 2022, which was defeated in the Senate Committee on Health and Welfare chaired by State Senator Ralph Alvarado. As she proposed it, it would have banned the state government, local governments, state colleges, and private employers from forcing employees or applicants to disclose whether or not they have received any COVID-19 vaccine shots. The Kentucky Chamber of Commerce opposed HB 28. An amended version of the bill, which excluded private employers, cleared the House Committee in March 2022, and passed in the House.

In January 2026, Maddox criticized the killing of Alex Pretti, saying "Your federal government is trying to convince you that the mere state of being armed—...is a “threat to law enforcement.” Subverting the 2nd Amendment was not ok under Biden, and it's not ok now."

=== 2023 gubernatorial campaign ===
On June 6, 2022, Maddox announced that she would run in the 2023 Kentucky gubernatorial election. In her announcement video, she criticized Beshear's handling of the COVID-19 pandemic, and fellow Republicans for not challenging the governor's emergency orders. As of November 2022, she was reported to have raised $210,796 for her campaign. Maddox withdrew from the race on December 20, 2022.

== Personal life ==
Maddox married Eldon Maddox in 2008, and they have two children. She attends an evangelical Christian church in Williamstown, Kentucky.
