= Jim Gooch Jr. =

American politician (born 1951)

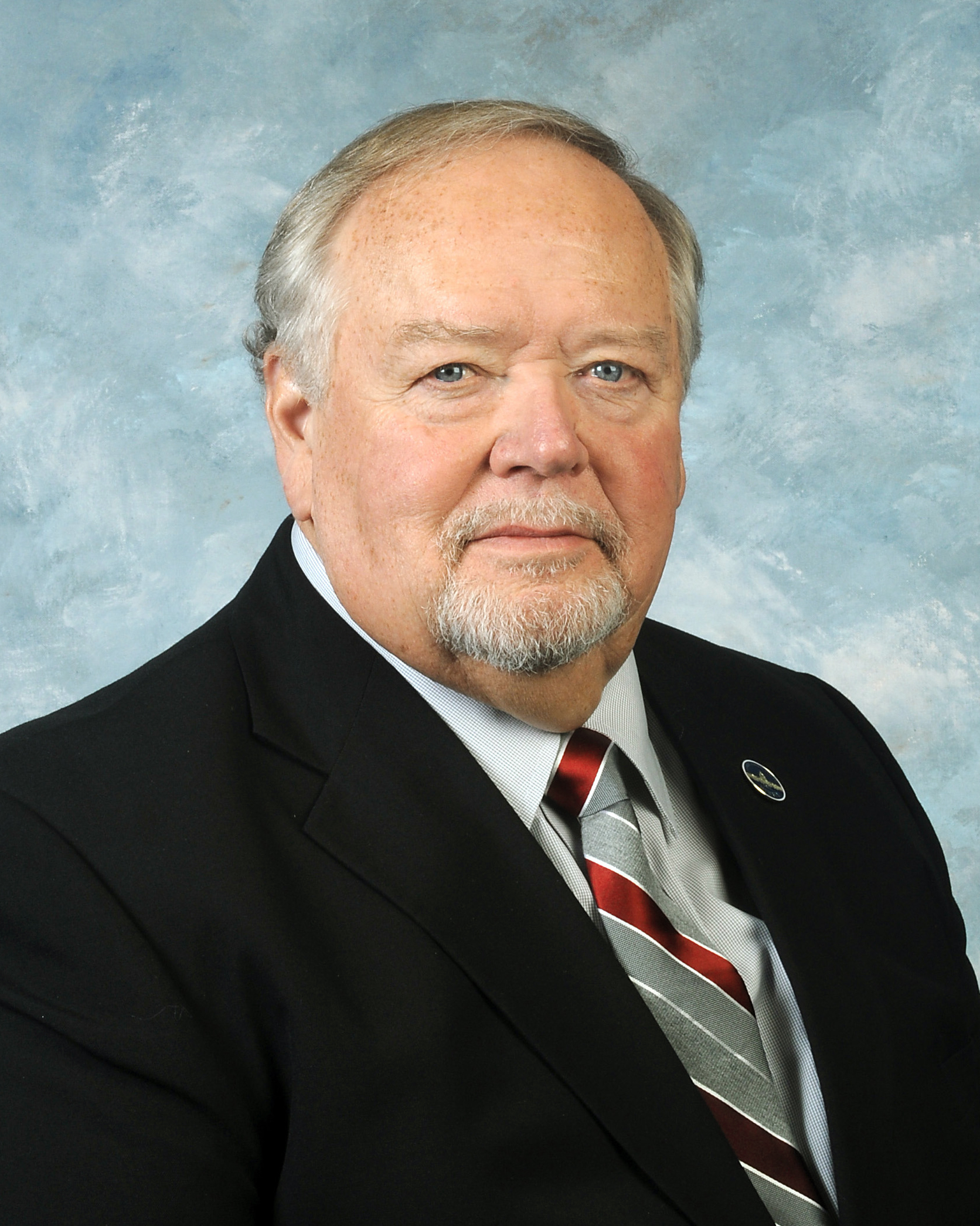
- Official portrait, 2017

Member of the Kentucky House of Representatives from the 12th district
- Incumbent
- Assumed office January 1, 1995
- Preceded by: Dorsey Ridley

Personal details
- Born: April 13, 1951 (age 75)
- Party: Republican (since 2015); Democratic (until 2015)
- Profession: Insurance agent
- Committees: Natural Resources and Energy (Chair); Banking and Insurance; Elections, Constitutional Amendments, and Intergovernmental Affairs; Veterans, Military Affairs, and Public Protection

James Alfred Gooch Jr. (born April 13, 1951) is an American politician and member of the Kentucky House of Representatives since January 1995. He represents Kentucky's 12th House district, which includes Crittenden, McLean, Union, and Webster counties. Gooch switched parties from Democratic to Republican in December 2015. He has served as chair of the House Standing Committee on Natural Resources and Energy for over 20 years. He has been the longest-serving member of the House since the retirement of Ruth Ann Palumbo in 2024.

== Background ==
Gooch was the founder and president of Gooch Insurance Associates from 1982 until it was sold in 1998. He been a licensed real estate sales associate since 1987.

He has previously served in various community roles such as president of the Providence Chamber of Commerce, Providence Jaycees, and Providence Ruritan Club as well as a board member of the Webster County Airport Board and Webster County Economic Development Board. He also previously served as Vice President of Membership, Vice President of Community Development, and State Treasurer of the Kentucky Jaycees. Gooch was named Providence “Citizen of the Year” in 1990.

== Political career ==
=== Local government ===
Gooch was elected mayor of Providence, Kentucky and served in this position from 1982 to 1986. He went on to serve on the Providence city council from 1990 to 1993 before filing to replace retiring House District 12 incumbent Dorsey Ridley.

=== Elections ===
- 1994 Gooch won the four-way 1994 Democratic Primary and was unopposed for the November 8, 1994 General election.
- 1996 Gooch was challenged in the 1996 Democratic Primary, but won, and was unopposed for the November 5, 1996 General election.
- 1998 Gooch was challenged in the three-way 1998 Democratic Primary, but won, and was unopposed for the November 3, 1998 General election.
- 2000 Gooch was challenged in the three-way 2000 Democratic Primary, winning with 1,641 votes (53.7%) and was unopposed for the November 7, 2000 General election, winning with 8,967 votes.
- 2002 Gooch was challenged in the 2002 Democratic Primary, winning with 5,906 votes (73.8%) and was unopposed for the November 5, 2002 General election, winning with 7,159 votes.
- 2004 Gooch was unopposed for both the 2004 Democratic Primary and the November 2, 2004 General election, winning with 9,973 votes.
- 2006 Gooch was unopposed for both the 2006 Democratic Primary and the November 7, 2006 General election, winning with 8,630 votes.
- 2008 Gooch was unopposed for both the 2008 Democratic Primary and the November 4, 2008 General election, winning with 12,739 votes.
- 2010 Gooch was challenged in the May 18, 2010 Democratic Primary, winning with 5,731 votes (77.8%) and was unopposed for the November 2, 2010 General election, winning with 9,842 votes.
- 2012 Gooch was challenged in the May 22, 2012 Democratic Primary, winning with 1,569 votes (66.0%) and was unopposed for the November 6, 2012 General election, winning with 12,394 votes.
- 2014 Gooch was unopposed in the May 20, 2014 Democratic Primary, and won the 2014 Kentucky House of Representatives election against Republican candidate Dianne Burns Mackey, winning with 9,465 votes.
- 2016 Gooch was unopposed in the May 17, 2016 Republican Primary, and won the 2016 Kentucky House of Representatives election against Democratic candidate Jim Townsend, winning with 12,711 votes.
- 2018 Gooch was unopposed in the May 22, 2018 Republican Primary, and won the 2018 Kentucky House of Representatives election against Democratic candidate Bruce Kunze, winning with 10,854 votes.
- 2020 Gooch was unopposed in the 2020 Republican primary, and won the 2020 Kentucky House of Representatives election against Democratic candidate Art McLaughlin, winning with 16,891 votes.
- 2022 Gooch was challenged in the May 17, 2022 Republican Primary by Lynn Belcher, but won with 2,442 votes. Gooch won the 2022 Kentucky House of Representatives election against Democratic candidate Alan Lossner, winning with 12,131 votes.
- 2024 Gooch was unopposed in the 2024 Republican Primary, and won the 2024 Kentucky House of Representatives election with 15,804 votes (79.8%) against Democratic candidate Alton Ayer.
