= Kimberly Poore Moser =

American politician (born 1962)

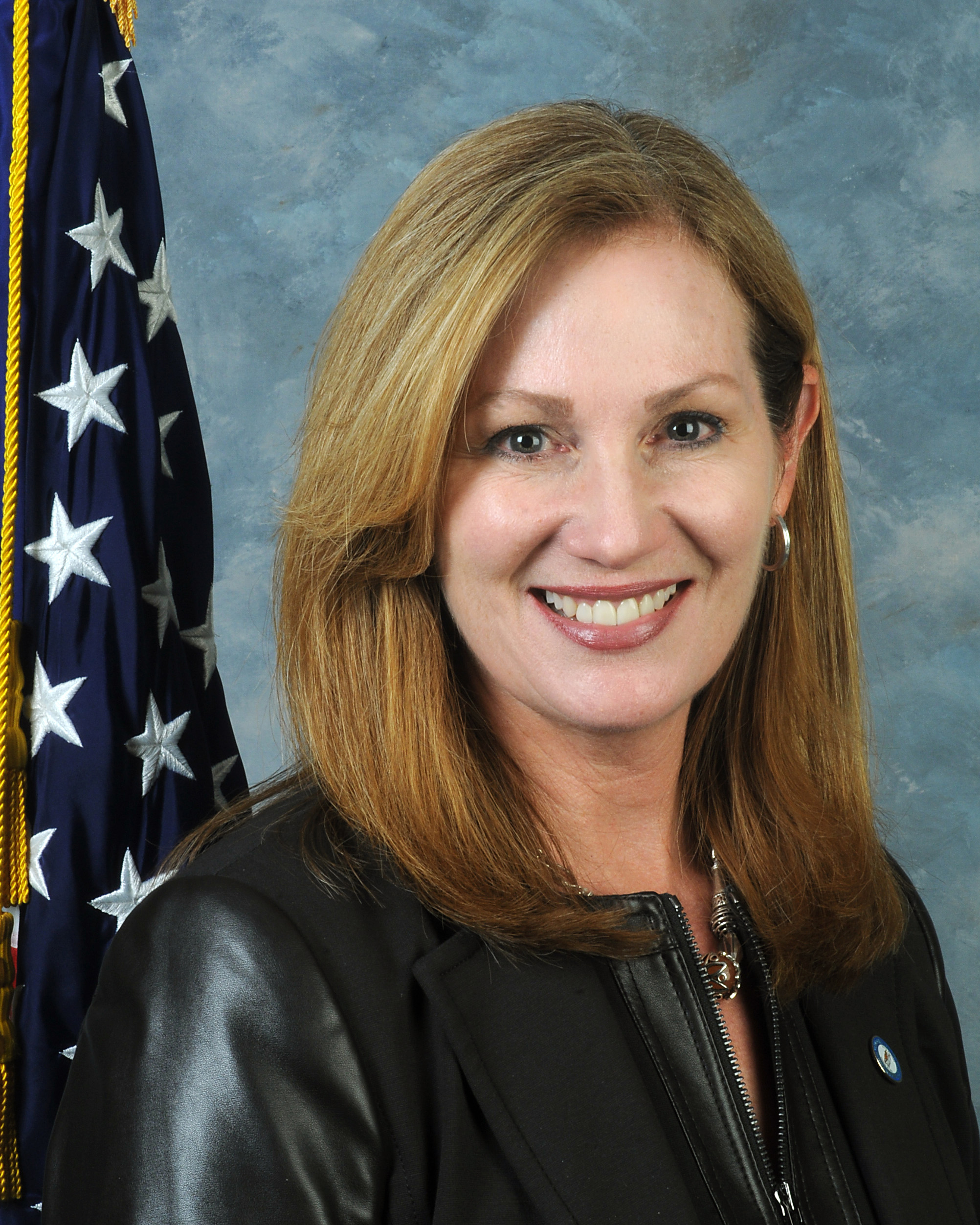
- Official portrait, 2016

Member of the Kentucky House of Representatives from the 64th district
- Incumbent
- Assumed office January 1, 2017
- Preceded by: Thomas Kerr

Personal details
- Born: June 8, 1962 (age 64)
- Party: Republican
- Spouse: Neal Moser
- Children: 5
- Education: Spalding University (BA); University of Kentucky

Kimberly Poore Moser (born June 8, 1962) is an American politician and Republican member of the Kentucky House of Representatives from Kentucky's 64th House district since January 2017. Her district includes parts of Kenton County. Currently, Moser serves as chair of the House Standing Committee on Health Services.

== Background ==
Moser was born July 8, 1962, and graduated from Connor High School in Hebron, Kentucky. She earned a Bachelor of Science in nursing from Spaulding University in 1984 and attended the University of Kentucky for architectural graduate work from 1992 until 1994.

Moser is a registered nurse and worked primarily in neonatal intensive care units as well as a flight nurse. She served as president of the Northern Kentucky Medical Society Alliance, Kentucky Medical Society Alliance, and the American Medical Association Alliance. Moser also founded and served as director of the Office of the Northern Kentucky Drug Control Policy.

== Political career ==
=== PAC and campaign leadership ===
In September 2013, Moser was elected chair of the Kentucky Physicians Political Action Committee (KPPAC), becoming the first non-physician in the nation to chair a physicians' political action committee. During this period, Moser also served as chair of Republican representative Diane St. Onge's 2014 reelection campaign to Kentucky's 63rd House district.

=== Elections ===
- 2016 Incumbent representative Thomas Kerr chose not to seek reelection following his appointment by Governor Matt Bevin as chief of staff to the Kentucky Justice and Public Safety Cabinet. Moser won the 2016 Republican primary with 1,761 votes (77%) and won the 2016 Kentucky House of Representatives election with 15,220 votes (69.1%) against Democratic candidate Lucas Deaton.
- 2018 Moser was unopposed in the 2018 Republican primary and won the 2018 Kentucky House of Representatives election with 10,728 votes (66.7%) against Democratic candidate Larry Varney.
- 2020 Moser was unopposed in the 2020 Republican primary and won the 2020 Kentucky House of Representatives election with 18,612 votes (72.5%) against Democratic candidate Larry Varney.
- 2022 Moser won the 2022 Republican primary with 2,007 votes (73.7%) and won the 2022 Kentucky House of Representatives election with 9,104 votes (65.6%) against Democratic candidate Anita Isaacs.
- 2024 Moser won the 2024 Republican primary with 1,542 votes (51.4%) and won the 2024 Kentucky House of Representatives election with 14,407 (66.1%) against Democratic candidate Heather Crabbe.
