= Deanna Gordon =

American politician and audiologist

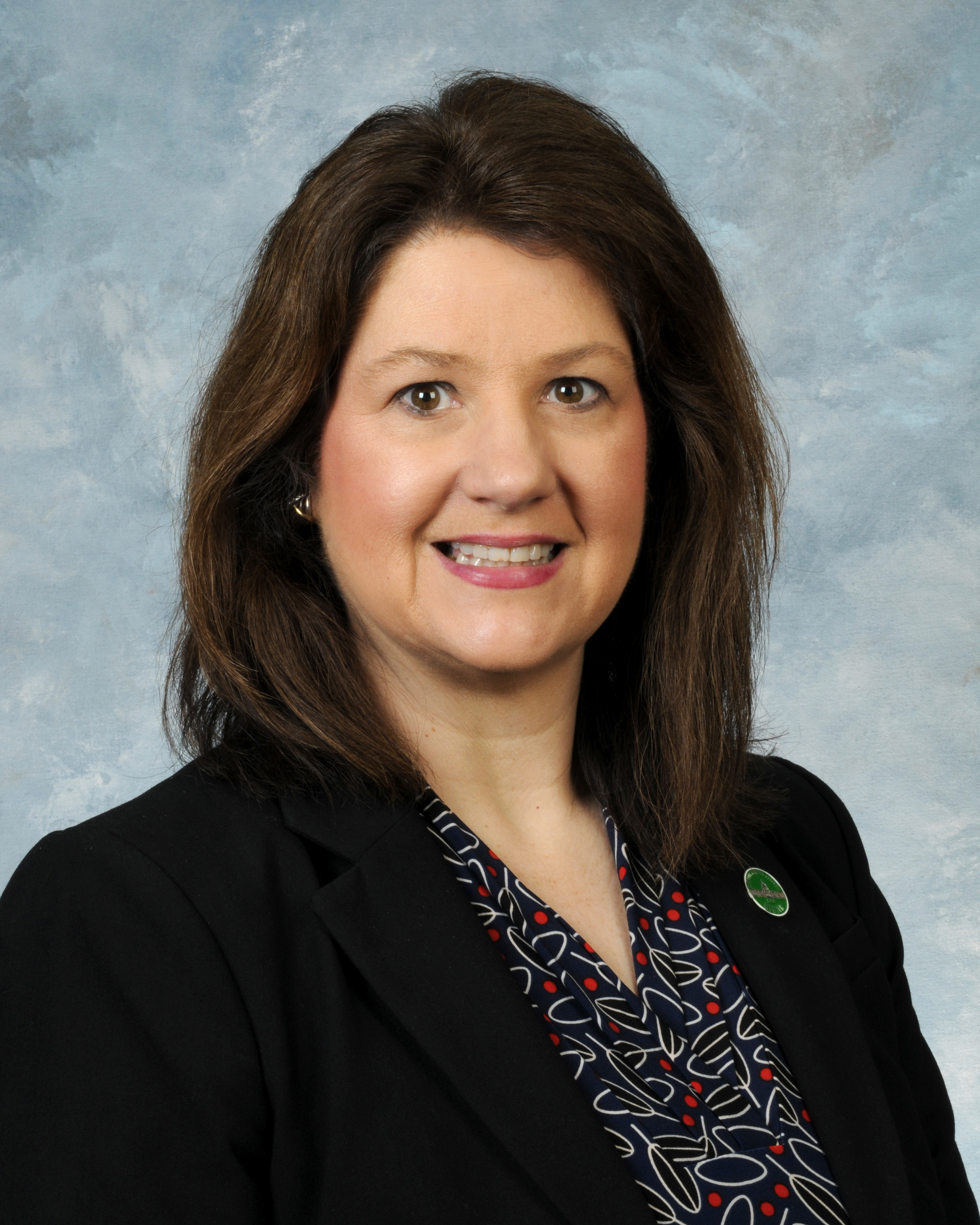
- Official portrait, 2019

Member of the Kentucky House of Representatives from the 81st district
- Incumbent
- Assumed office January 1, 2019
- Preceded by: C. Wesley Morgan

Personal details
- Born: Deanna Lynn Frazier; August 23, 1969 (age 57) Richmond, Kentucky, U.S.
- Party: Republican
- Children: 2
- Education: Eastern Kentucky University (BS); University of Cincinnati (MA); A. T. Still University (AuD)

Deanna Frazier Gordon (born August 23, 1969) is an American politician and audiologist serving as a Republican member of the Kentucky House of Representatives from Kentucky's 81st House district. Her district includes part of Madison County.

== Background ==
Gordon earned a Bachelor of Science degree in communication disorders from Eastern Kentucky University in 1991, Master of Arts in communication disorders from the University of Cincinnati, and Doctor of Audiology from the A.T. Still University School of Health Sciences in 2006.

Prior to entering politics, Gordon worked as an audiologist for the American Academy of Audiology and the Academy of Doctors of Audiology. Gordon is also the founder of Bluegrass Hearing Clinic., LLC in Manchester, Kentucky.

== Political career ==
=== 2026 congressional campaign ===
In July 2025, Gordon announced her candidacy for Kentucky's 6th congressional district following the decision of incumbent Andy Barr to run for the United States Senate in 2026. She raised $356,707 for her campaign, which included over $260,000 of self-funding. In December, Gordon announced the suspension of her campaign as well as her intent to instead seek reelection to the Kentucky House in 2026.

=== Elections ===
- 2018 Gordon won the 2018 Republican primary with 1,477 votes (56.8%) against Kentucky's 81st House district incumbent C. Wesley Morgan and won the 2018 Kentucky House of Representatives election with 8,111 votes (50.1%) against Democratic candidate Morgan Eaves.
- 2020 Gordon was unopposed in the 2020 Republican primary and won the 2020 Kentucky House of Representatives election with 12,019 votes (56.9%) against Democratic candidate Mike Eaves.
- 2022 Gordon was unopposed in both the 2022 Republican primary and the 2022 Kentucky House of Representatives election, winning the latter with 12,088 votes.
- 2024 Gordon was unopposed in both the 2024 Republican primary and the 2024 Kentucky House of Representatives election, winning the latter with 17,129 votes.
