= Rick Girdler =

American politician

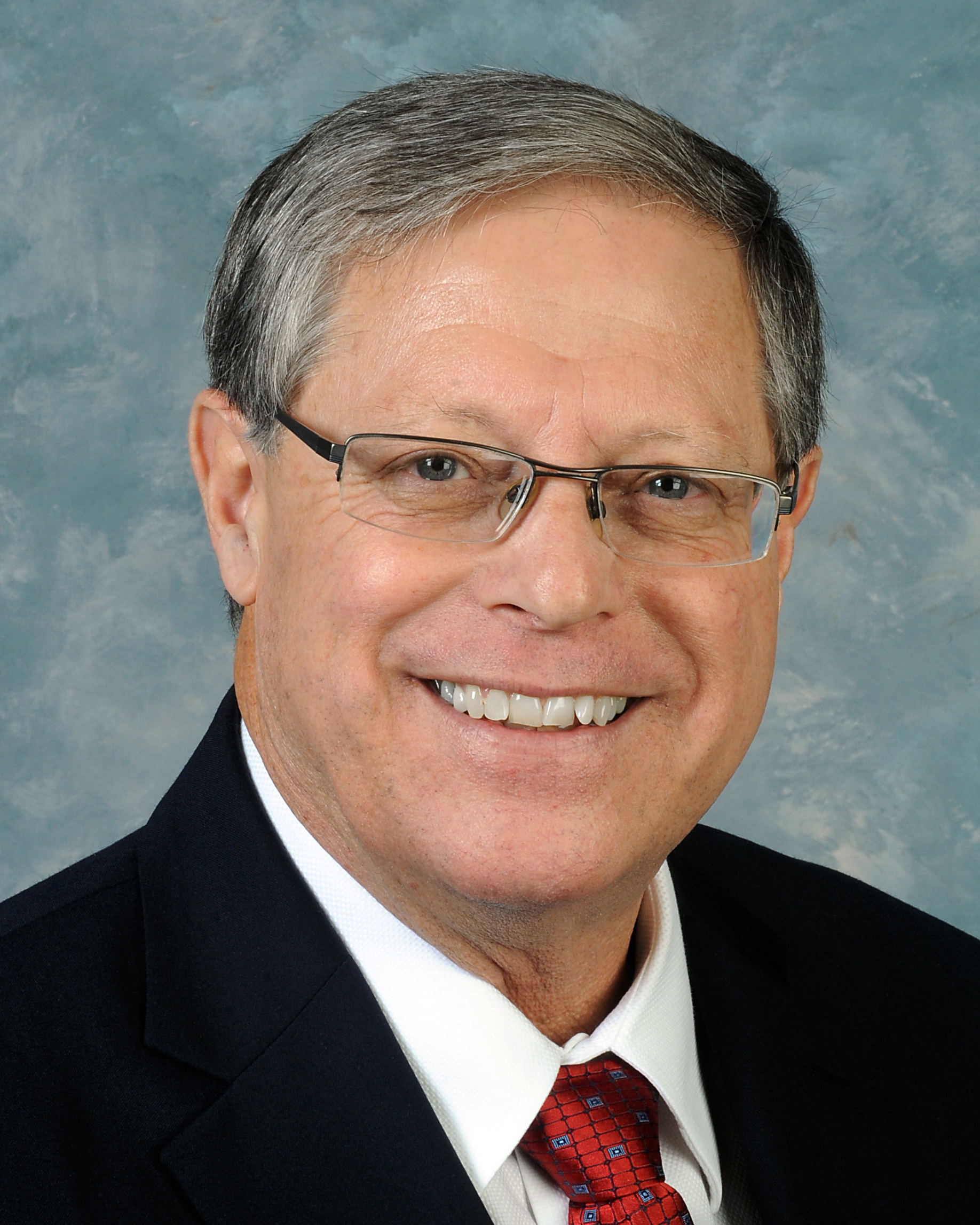
- Official portrait, 2016

Member of the Kentucky Senate from the 15th district
- Incumbent
- Assumed office January 1, 2017
- Preceded by: Chris Girdler

Personal details
- Born: May 23, 1955 (age 71) Somerset, Kentucky, U.S.
- Party: Republican

Richard A. Girdler (born May 23, 1955) is an American politician who has served in the Kentucky Senate from the 15th district since 2017.
