= David Meade =

American politician (born 1976)

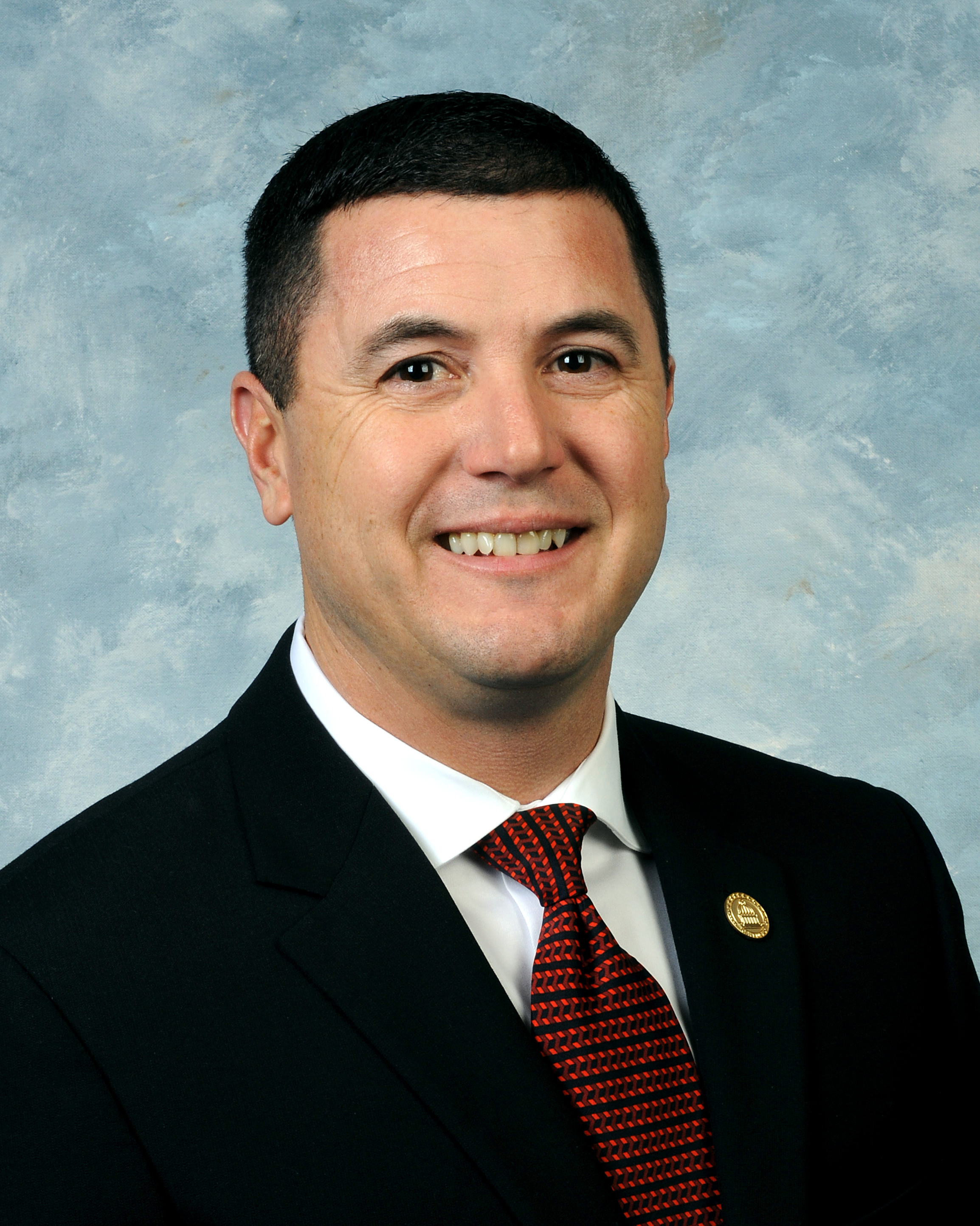
- Official portrait, 2020

Speaker pro tempore of the Kentucky House of Representatives
- Incumbent
- Assumed office January 8, 2019
- Preceded by: David Osborne

Majority Caucus Chair of the Kentucky House of Representatives
- In office January 3, 2017 – January 8, 2019
- Preceded by: Sannie Overly
- Succeeded by: Suzanne Miles

Member of the Kentucky House of Representatives from the 80th district
- Incumbent
- Assumed office January 1, 2013
- Preceded by: Danny Ford

Personal details
- Born: June 22, 1976 (age 50)
- Party: Republican
- Education: Bluegrass Community and Technical College (attended); University of Kentucky (attended)

David Ray Meade (born June 22, 1976) is an American politician and Republican member of the Kentucky House of Representatives representing Kentucky's 80th House district since January 2013. His legislative district includes Garrard and Lincoln Counties as well as part of Pulaski County. Meade serves as Speaker pro tempore of the Kentucky House of Representatives, a constitutional office and the second-highest position in the 100-member legislative chamber.

== Education ==
Meade attended Lexington Community College and the University of Kentucky, graduating from the latter with a Bachelor of Science.

== Career ==
In addition to his service as state representative, Meade is a managing broker at Lincoln Realty and Auction Company and serves as a member of the National Association of Realtors, Kentucky Association of Realtors, Kentucky Auctioneers Association, Lexington Bluegrass Association of Realtors and the Central Kentucky Association of Realtors.

He also serves on the Board of Directors for Catalyst Resources International (CRI), an organization that seeks to partner with Guatemalan pastors and other Christian organizations in an effort to meet the physical and spiritual needs of the Guatemalan people. Through the organization, Meade was a founding member of Mimi's House, a CRI property that is used as a housing facility and ministry center in Guatemala.

== Elections ==
- 2012 When District 80 Representative Danny Ford retired and left the seat open, Meade won the four-way May 22, 2012 Republican Primary with 1,843 votes (45.9%) and was unopposed for the November 6, 2012 General election, winning with 12,462 votes.
- Meade has faced no opposition since.

== Leadership in Kentucky House of Representatives ==
Shortly after Republicans took control of the Kentucky House of Representatives in November 2016 for the first time in 95 years, Meade was elected Majority Caucus Chairman by the 64 member House Republican Caucus. According to Meade, the responsibilities of the position include overseeing the caucus, voicing their concerns and opinions to the rest of the leadership team, and nurturing a strong sense of unity within the caucus. Meade became both the first Republican Majority Caucus Chairman in Kentucky history as well as the first Lincoln County representative to serve in House majority leadership.

After returning after the 2018 elections with a 61-member super majority, House Republicans nominated Meade for Speaker pro tempore, the second-highest position in the House of Representatives. Upon his election by the majority party, Meade remarked that he was "honored and humbled" by the vote of confidence from his colleagues. When the full House of Representatives convened on January 8, 2019, for the 2019 session, Meade was formally elected to the position by the full body without opposition. The House Speaker pro tempore is one of five members of majority leadership, and is responsible for assisting the Speaker of the House and presiding over the body in his absence. During his time in the legislature, the American Conservative Union gave him evaluations of 77%, 89%, 74% and 83%.

== Adoption and Foster Care Reform ==
Following the formation of a House Working Group on Adoption and Foster Care Reform in April 2017, Representative Meade led the charge in pursuing comprehensive reforms to Kentucky's foster care and adoption systems. After spending the better part of a year gathering testimony and ideas for improving Kentucky's adoption and foster care systems, Meade filed legislation to revamp the systems in the form of House Bill 1, making it the top priority of the House of Representatives during the 2018 session.

Meade described the legislation as designed to protect "the most tender citizens of the Commonwealth" with the goal of doing what is best for children by streamlining the family court system to place children into homes in a quicker manner, eliminating barriers to adoption, and giving foster parents more rights. Some highlights of HB 1 include: expanding the definition of child abuse to include pregnant women who abuse drugs yet refuse treatment, creating the Child Welfare Oversight and Advisory Committee to provide regular oversight to child welfare, creating a confidential putative father registry, creating an independent ombudsman to investigate child abuse and foster care complaints at the Cabinet for Health and Family services, and creating more specific timelines for the termination of parental rights and placement of children into new homes when a child can not be returned home safely and is eligible for adoption.

After sending the legislation onto the Governor with just one dissenting vote on April 2, 2018, Meade described passage of the measure as the proudest moment of his legislative career. Numerous advocates praised the bipartisan measure, including the Kentucky Baptist Convention and Kentucky Youth Advocates, and Meade co-wrote with First Lady Glenna Bevin that the bill would "transform Kentucky's social services, providing hope and an easier route out of state care for some of our most vulnerable citizens."

Thanks to his work on child welfare issues, Meade was awarded the sixth annual Mary Ellen award in September 2018 by Prevent Child Abuse Kentucky, a nonprofit organization dedicated to the well-being of children. Meade, an adoptive father in his own right, now serves as co-chairman of the child welfare legislative oversight committee that was established according to House Bill 1.

Meade's work on child welfare issues continued in the 2019 session, including spearheading passage of a foster child 'bill of rights.' HB 158 grants 16 statutory rights to children in out-of-home placement, including the right to "adequate food, clothing and shelter," a "safe, stable and secure family," and more. The legislation also makes an individual's voluntary consent to place a child for adoption final after 72 hours, down from the former 20 day revocation period, in order to further incentivize families to adopt Kentucky children. Meade also passed HB 446 in 2019, which is another measure to speed up adoptions, ease burdensome restrictions on foster parents and give foster parents a stronger voice in court proceedings involving the termination of parental rights. Both measures passed with widespread bipartisan support.

Kentucky House of Representatives
Preceded by David Osborne	Speaker pro tempore of the Kentucky House of Representatives; 2019–present	Incumbent
