= Richard White (Kentucky politician) =

American politician (born 1952)

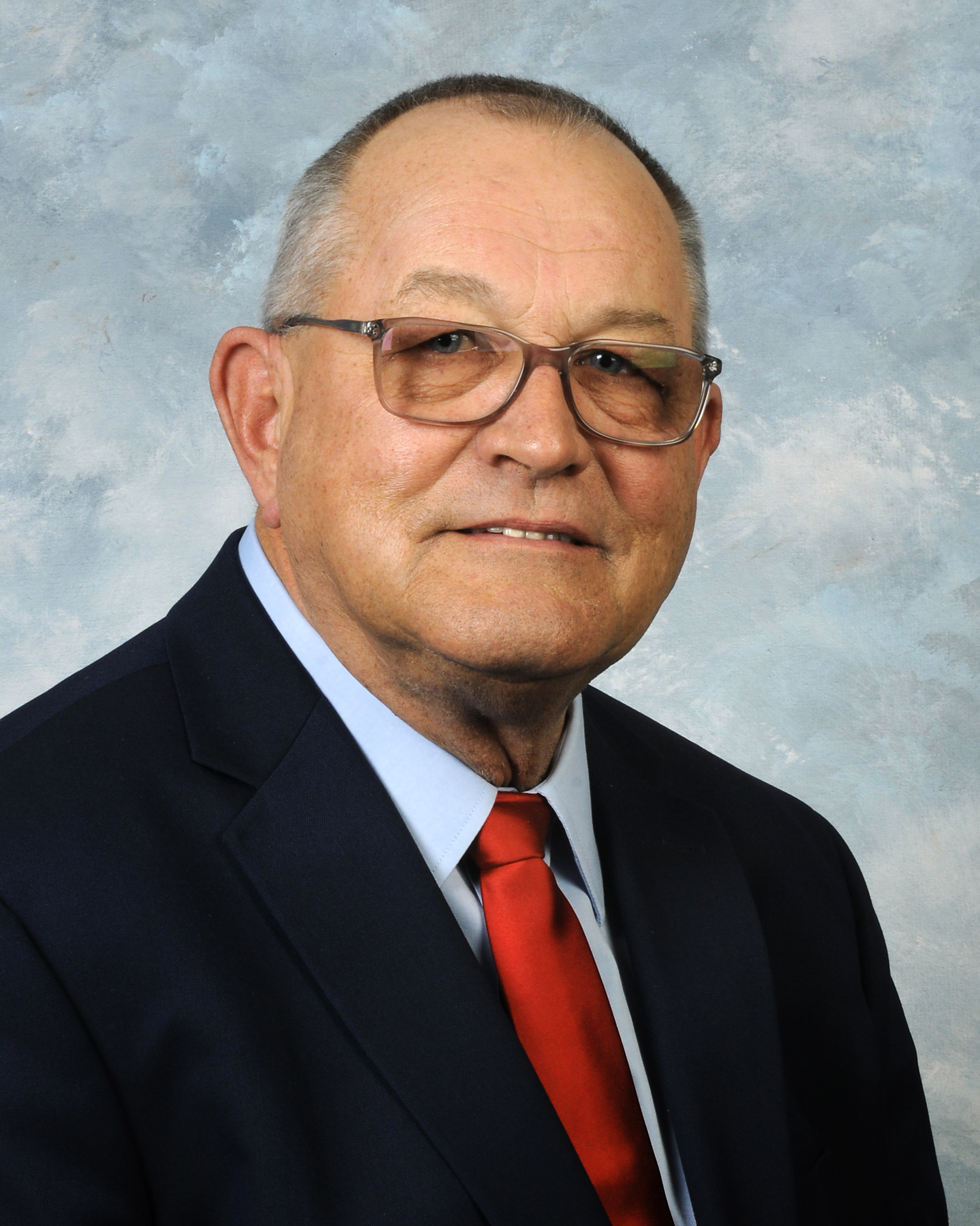

Member of the Kentucky House of Representatives from the 99th district
- Incumbent
- Assumed office March 3, 2020
- Preceded by: Rocky Adkins

Personal details
- Born: November 4, 1952 (age 73) Fort Meade, Maryland
- Party: Republican
- Children: 4
- Occupation: Businessman
- Committees: Natural Resources & Energy (Vice Chair); Small Business & Information Technology; Tourism & Outdoor Recreation

Richard Lee White (born November 4, 1952) is an American politician who has served as a Republican member of the Kentucky House of Representatives since March 2020. He represents Kentucky's 99th House district which includes Elliott, Morgan, and Rowan counties.

Following the resignation of Democratic incumbent, Rocky Adkins, White won the special election to fill the 99th House district's vacancy on February 25, 2020.

== Background ==
White was born on November 4, 1952, in Fort Meade, Maryland. He went on to graduate from the National Hardwood Lumber Association's Inspection School in 1971 before opening his own lumber business in 1976. During 1989, White attended Santa Monica College and studied psychology.

As the founder and president of Richard White Wood Products, White was active in the small business community and politics. He was appointed by President Ronald Reagan as a moderator for the White House Conference of Small Businesses, received the Small Business Exporter of the Year award by the U.S. Small Business Administration and Governor Martha Layne Collins. He also served as co-chair of the Rowan County Republican Party, chair of George W. Bush's Rowan County election committee, and a member of the Republican Party of Kentucky's central committee.

== Political career ==
=== Collapse at Kentucky State Capitol ===
In February 2022, White collapsed while in a meeting with other state legislators at the Kentucky State Capitol. He was taken by ambulance to Frankfort Regional Hospital where he was admitted under critical condition.

It was found that he had internal bleeding in his intestinal tract, and had already lost a significant amount of blood. After his condition continued to deteriorate, he was life flighted to the University of Kentucky's Albert B. Chandler Hospital for immediate surgery, which was successful.

=== Elections ===
- 1992 (special) Kentucky's 27th Senate district incumbent Woody May resigned from office on November 25, 1991, due to health concerns. Governor Paul Patton called for a special election to be held on January 7, 1992, to fill the vacancy. White was selected as the Republican candidate for the race but was defeated in the 1992 Kentucky special election, garnering 3,024 votes (32.3%) against Democratic candidate Walter Blevins.
- 1992 White won the 1992 Republican primary for Kentucky's 27th Senate district with 2,371 votes (68.6%) but was defeated in the 1992 Kentucky Senate election, garnering 14,667 votes (46.1%) against Democratic incumbent Walter Blevins.
- 2008 White was unopposed in the 2008 Republican primary for Kentucky's 27th Senate district but was defeated in the 2008 Kentucky Senate election, garnering 14,717 votes (35.1%) against Democratic incumbent Walter Blevins.
- 2020 (special) Kentucky's 99th House district incumbent and minority leader Rocky Adkins resigned from office on December 10, 2019, following his appointment as senior advisor to Governor Andy Beshear. Governor Beshear subsequently called for a special election to be held on February 25, 2020, to fill the vacancies left in the 67th and 99th House districts. White won the 2020 Kentucky House of Representatives special election with 4,750 votes (56%) against Democratic candidate Bill Redwine.
- 2020 White was unopposed in the 2020 Republican primary and won the 2020 Kentucky House of Representatives election with 12,101 votes (64.6%) against Democratic candidate Bill Redwine.
- 2022 White was unopposed in the 2022 Republican primary and won the 2022 Kentucky House of Representatives election with 8,188 votes (60.4%) against Democratic candidate Kevin Anderson.
- 2024 White was unopposed in both the 2024 Republican primary and the 2024 Kentucky House of Representatives election, winning the latter with 13,351 votes.
