= Stephen Meredith (politician) =

American politician

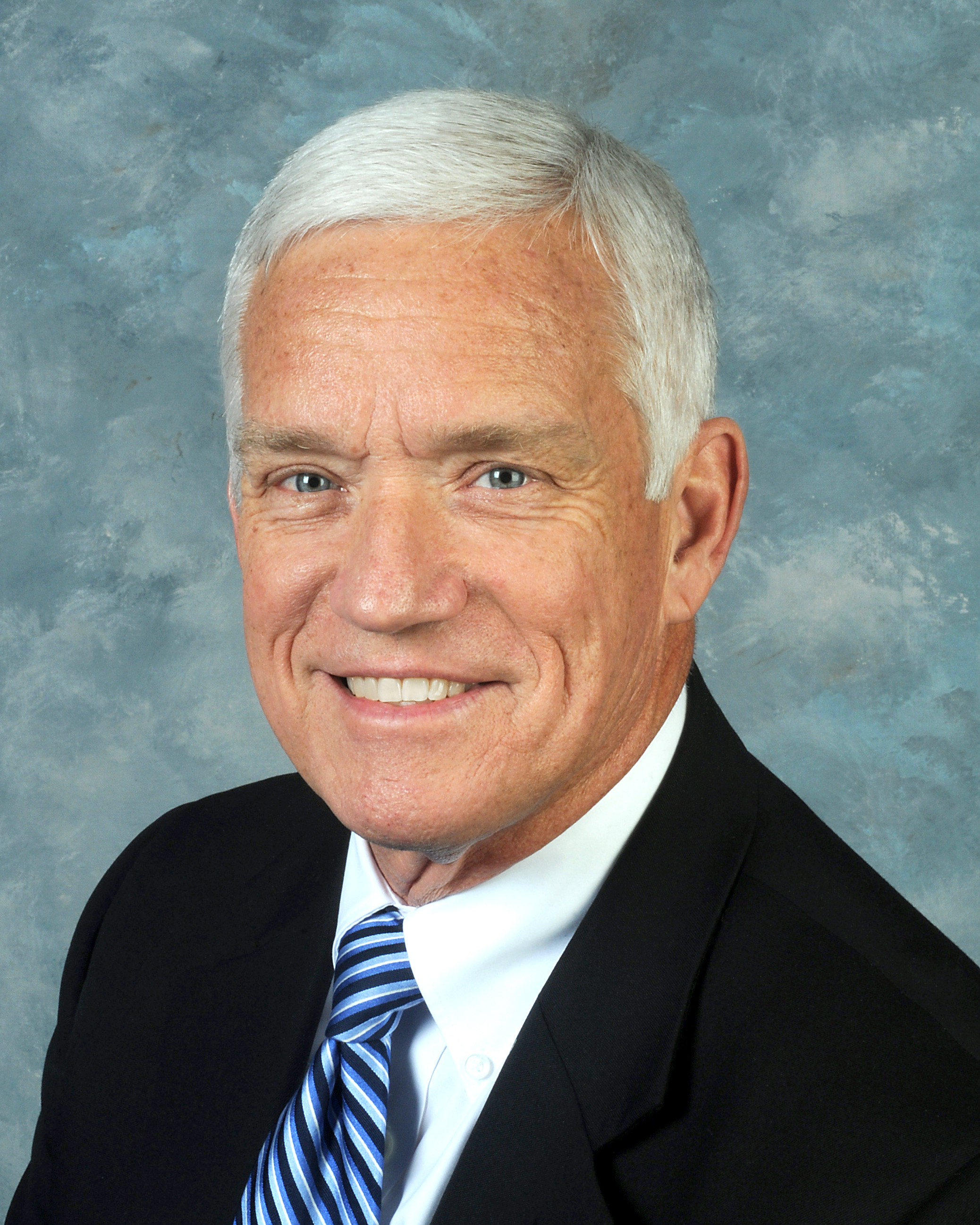
- Official portrait, 2016

Member of the Kentucky Senate from the 5th district
- Incumbent
- Assumed office January 1, 2017
- Preceded by: Carroll Gibson

Personal details
- Born: June 21, 1953 (age 73) Leitchfield, Kentucky, U.S.
- Party: Republican
- Spouse: Karen
- Relations: Chad Meredith (son)
- Children: 2
- Education: Western Kentucky University (BS); University of Minnesota (MHA)

Stephen Larry Meredith (born June 21, 1953) is an American politician serving as a member of the Kentucky Senate from the 5th district. Elected in November 2016, he assumed office in January 2017.

== Early life and education ==
Meredith was born in Leitchfield, Kentucky in 1953. He earned a Bachelor of Science degree in business administration and accounting from Western Kentucky University and a Master of Health Administration from the University of Minnesota.

== Career ==
Prior to entering politics, Meredith worked as the CEO of the Twin Lakes Regional Medical Center. He was an unsuccessful candidate for the Kentucky House of Representatives in 2012 and 2014. In 2016, he was elected to the Kentucky Senate. In the Senate, Meredith serves as chair of the Budget Review Subcommittee on Human Resources. He also serves as vice chair of the Senate Health and Welfare Committee and Senate Veterans, Military Affairs, and Public Protection Committee. He is co-chair of the Senate Medicaid Oversight and Advisory Committee and Senate Government Contract Review Committee.
