= Ryan Dotson =

American politician and pastor

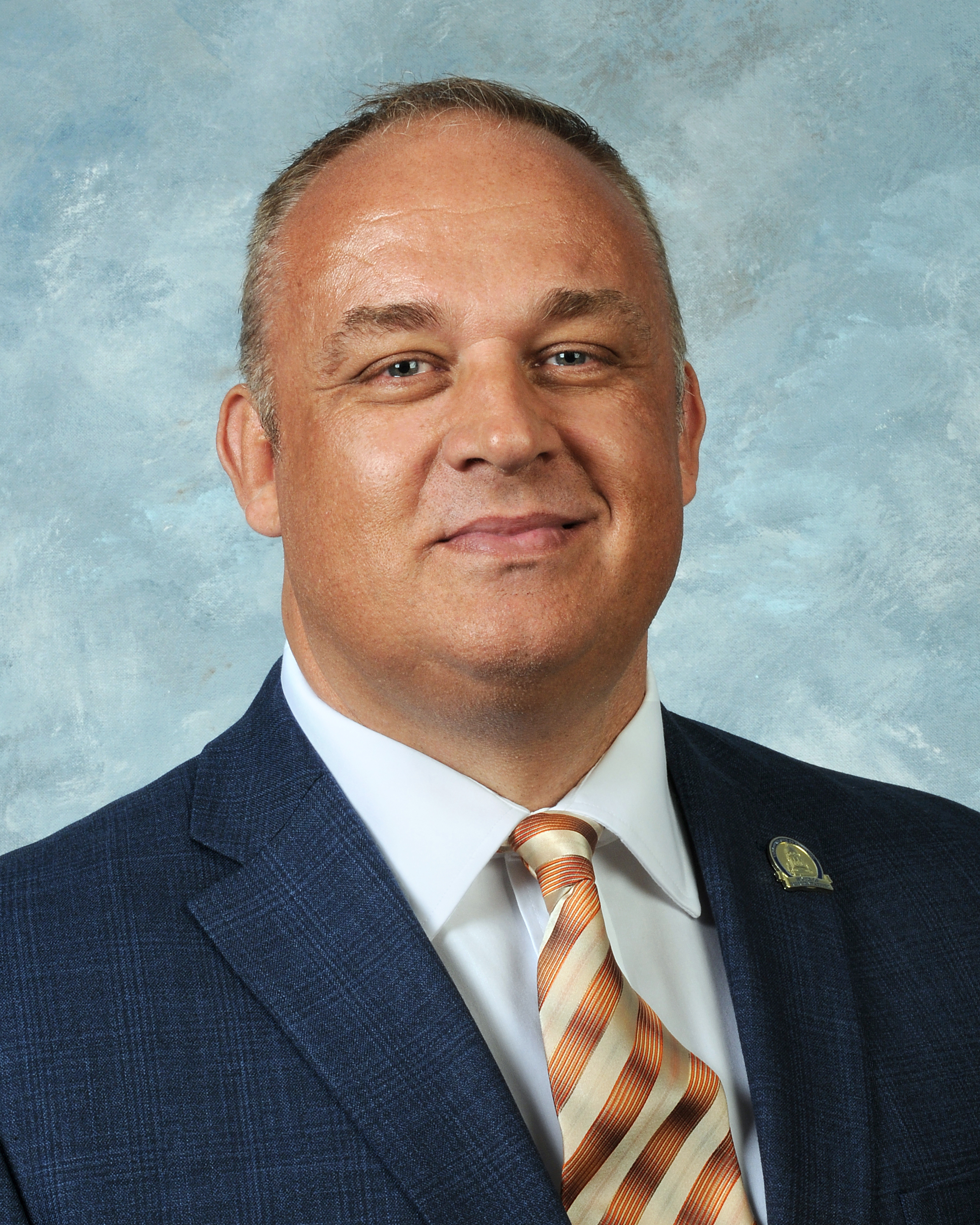

Member of the Kentucky House of Representatives from the 73rd district
- Incumbent
- Assumed office January 1, 2021
- Preceded by: Les Yates
- Succeeded by: Daniel Konstantopoulos (elect)

Personal details
- Born: David Ryan Dotson; November 22, 1972 (age 53) Pikeville, Kentucky, U.S.
- Party: Democratic (before 2012); Republican (2012–present)
- Spouse: Tresa Dotson
- Website: Campaign website State House website

Military service
- Branch/service: United States Army

David Ryan Dotson (born November 22, 1972) is an American pastor and politician who currently serves as a Republican member of the Kentucky House of Representatives. He has represented Kentucky's 73rd House district since January 2021.

In 2026, Dotson chose to run for Kentucky's 6th congressional district following incumbent Andy Barr's decision to run for the United States Senate. Dotson was defeated in the 2026 Republican primary by Ralph Alvarado.

== Background ==
Dotson was born on November 22, 1972, in Pikeville, Kentucky. He graduated from Phelps High School before attending community college in West Virginia. Dotson then enlisted in the United States Army, where he served as an X-ray tech. After leaving the army, he worked for a short time at the University of Kentucky's Albert B. Chandler Hospital before moving to Winchester, Kentucky.

While briefly involved in real estate, Dotson currently owns a daycare as well as numerous restaurants located in Winchester, Mount Sterling, Lexington, and Somerset.

Dotson is a Pentecostal Minister, and serves as senior pastor of Lighthouse World Outreach Center.

== Vanderpump Rules ==
In 2019, Dotson was scheduled to appear on an episode of Vanderpump Rules, a spin-off of the reality TV series The Real Housewives of Beverly Hills, to officiate the wedding of stars Jax Taylor and Brittany Cartwright. Dotson was later removed from the position after tweets resurfaced that were characterized as anti-LGBT and transphobic. While still invited as a guest, Dotson chose not to attend.

== Political career ==
=== Party switch ===
According to Dotson, he was raised in an environment surrounded by ancestral Democrats, where belonging to the party of Andrew Jackson and Harry S. Truman was "natural." However, Dotson switched his registration to the Republican party in 2012, citing Ronald Reagan in that the party had left him and "drifted too far left."

=== Legislative activities ===
On June 11, 2021, Dotson authored legislation that would ban transgender women from playing on women's sports teams in Kentucky. The bill passed, despite opposition from the ACLU of Kentucky, and The Human Rights Campaign.

=== 2026 House of Representatives Campaign ===
On April 22, 2025, Dotson declared his candidacy for Kentucky's 6th congressional district in the 2026 House of Representatives election after incumbent Andy Barr filed to run for U.S. Senate.

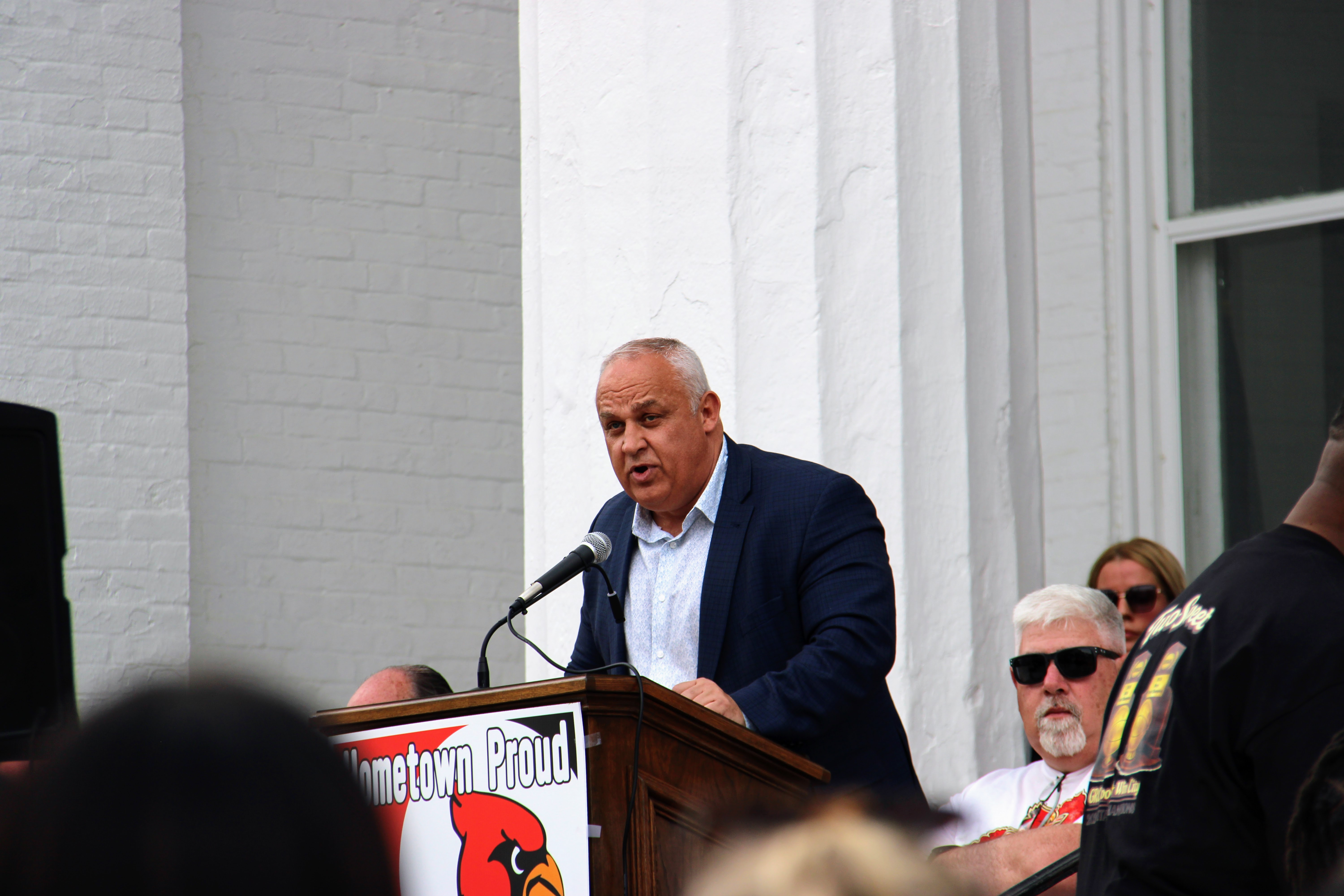
State Rep. Ryan Dotson, R-Winchester, addresses the crowd on April 12, 2026, during a parade in downtown Winchester celebrating George Rogers Clark's boys and girls basketball state championships.

=== Elections ===
- 2010 Dotson was defeated in the 2010 Democratic primary for Kentucky's 28th Senate district, garnering 6,705 votes (31.5%) against incumbent Senator and Minority Leader RJ Palmer.
- 2014 Dotson was defeated in the 2014 Kentucky general election for Clark County Judge Executive, garnering 5,343 votes (43.7%) against Democratic incumbent Henry Branham.
- 2020 Dotson won the 2020 Republican primary for Kentucky's 73rd House district with 2,356 votes (51.4%), unseating incumbent Les Yates. Dotson won the 2020 Kentucky House of Representatives election with 11,923 (56.9%) votes against Democratic candidate Kenneth Blair and write-in candidate Jada Brady.
- 2022 Dotson was unopposed in the 2022 Republican primary and won the 2022 Kentucky House of Representatives election with 8,704 votes (56.6%) against Democratic candidate Thomas Adams.
- 2024 Dotson was unopposed in the 2024 Republican primary and won the 2024 Kentucky House of Representatives election with 12,847 votes against Democratic candidate Rory Houlihan.
