= Matthew Koch =

American politician (born 1978)

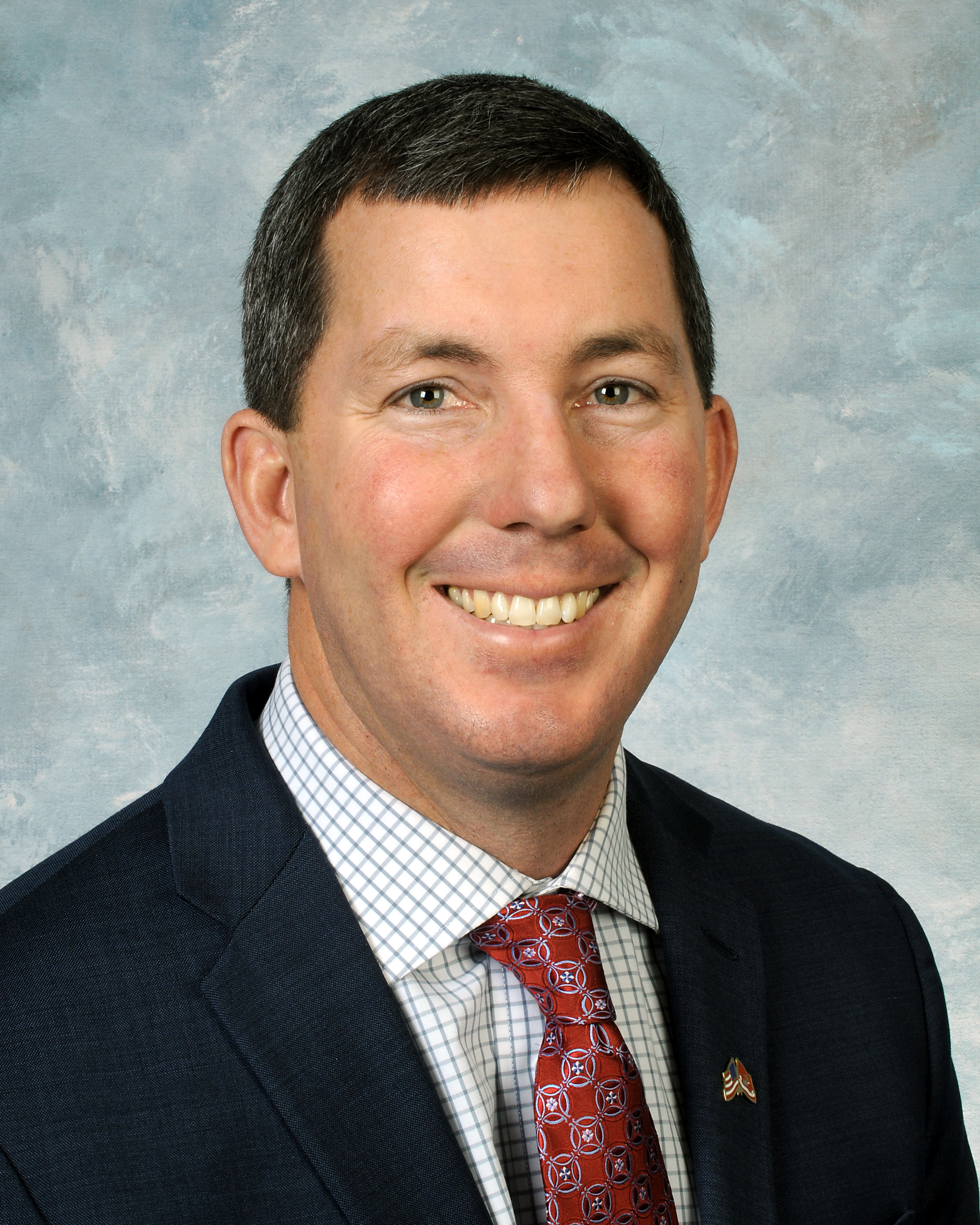

Member of the Kentucky House of Representatives from the 72nd district
- Incumbent
- Assumed office January 1, 2019
- Preceded by: Sannie Overly

Personal details
- Born: May 11, 1978 (age 48) Paris, Kentucky, U.S.
- Party: Republican
- Children: 3
- Education: University of Kentucky (BS)
- Committees: Licensing, Occupations, & Administrative Regulations (Chair); Agriculture; Elections, Const. Amendments & Intergovernmental Affairs; Veterans, Military Affairs, & Public Protection

Military service
- Branch/service: United States Marine Corps
- Years of service: 2000–2004
- Rank: Captain

Matthew Ryan Koch (born May 11, 1978) is an American politician serving as a Republican member of the Kentucky House of Representatives from Kentucky's 72nd House district. His district includes Bourbon, Fleming, and Nicholas County.

== Background ==
Koch was born in Paris, Kentucky, and graduated from Bourbon County High School. He went on to attend the Kentucky Horseshoeing School, before earning a Bachelor of Science in agriculture from the University of Kentucky College of Agriculture, Food, and Environment. Koch graduated with no student debt, and paid his way through college by working as a farrier.

In 2000, Koch served in the United States Marine Corps, and was deployed to Kosovo and Afghanistan. In 2004, he retired with the rank of captain.

In 2004, Koch began his own thoroughbred operation out of his parents' farm while still working as a farrier. In 2005, he co-founded Shawhan Place, a horse breeding and boarding farm located in Paris which he has co-owned ever since. He also serves as a board member of the Kentucky Thoroughbred Association.

== Political career ==
=== Elections ===
- 2018 Incumbent representative Sannie Overly chose not to seek reelection to Kentucky's 72nd House district. Koch was unopposed in the 2018 Republican primary and won the 2018 Kentucky House of Representatives election with 8,578 (51.3%) against Democratic candidate Emily Ferguson and Libertarian candidate Ann Cormican.
- 2020 Koch was unopposed in the 2020 Republican primary and won the 2020 Kentucky House of Representatives election with 13,268 votes (65.4%) against Democratic candidate Todd Neace.
- 2022 Koch was unopposed in both the 2022 Republican primary and the 2022 Kentucky House of Representatives election, winning the latter with 10,984 votes.
- 2024 Koch was unopposed in both the 2024 Republican primary and the 2024 Kentucky House of Representatives election, winning the latter with 15,453 votes.
