= David W. Osborne =

American politician (born 1964)

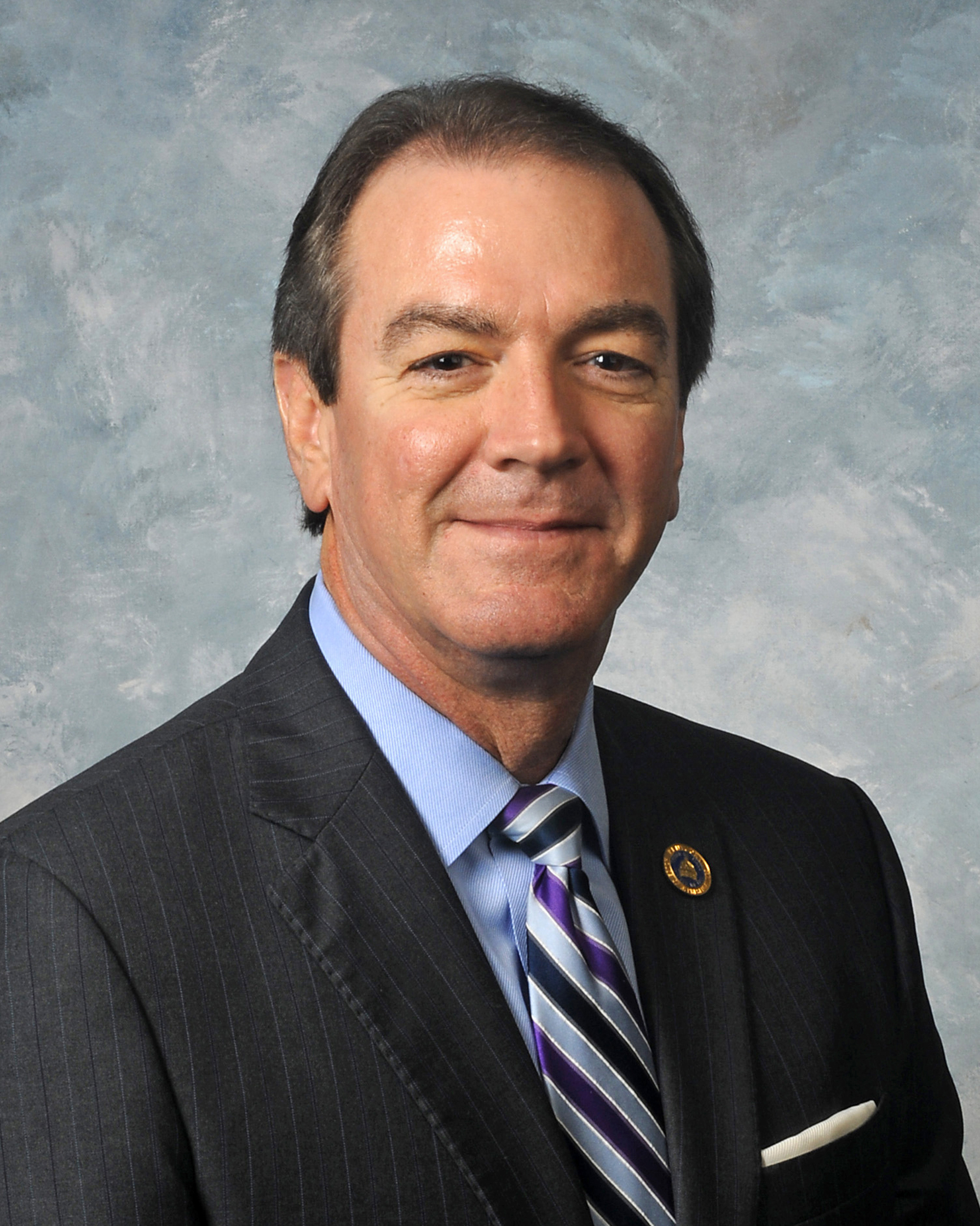
- Official portrait, 2016

94th Speaker of the Kentucky House of Representatives
- Incumbent
- Assumed office January 8, 2018 (Note: Acting: January 8, 2018 – January 8, 2019)
- Preceded by: Jeff Hoover

Speaker pro tempore of the Kentucky House of Representatives
- In office January 3, 2017 – January 8, 2019
- Preceded by: Jody Richards
- Succeeded by: David Meade

Member of the Kentucky House of Representatives from the 59th district
- Incumbent
- Assumed office May 24, 2005
- Preceded by: Tim Feeley

Personal details
- Born: March 27, 1964 (age 62) Oldham County, Kentucky, U.S.
- Party: Republican
- Education: University of Kentucky (BS)

David W. Osborne (born March 27, 1964) is an American politician who has served as a Republican member of the Kentucky House of Representatives since May 2005. He represents Kentucky's 59th House district which includes part of Oldham County.

Osborne has served as speaker of the Kentucky House of Representatives since January 8, 2019. He previously served as acting speaker following the resignation of Jeff Hoover in January 2018. In January 2017, Osborne was chosen as the first ever Republican speaker pro tempore after the party gained their first majority in the chamber since 1920.

Osborne's tenure as speaker is the longest of any Kentucky Republican, having been elected to the position for five consecutive terms.

== Early life and education ==
Osborne was born in Oldham County, Kentucky, to W. Donald "Don" and Patricia (Pearce) Osborne. His family has lived in the county for five generations, and his great-great-grandfather served as a member of the Kentucky House. According to Osborne, his mother was an active Republican volunteer with one of his oldest memories being door knocking with her in support of congressman Gene Snyder.

Osborne attended Oldham County High School, where he was an active member of both the school's Future Farmers of America chapter and served as state reporter. In 1986, he graduated with honors from the University of Kentucky, earning a Bachelor of Science degree in economics and agriculture finance.

For three years, Osborne worked as an auditor for the Farm Credit Administration. In 1989, Osborne received his real estate license and began working as a real estate agent, a career he continues today associated with Weichert, Realtors. By 2005, he also operated his own investment consulting firm aimed at assisting farmers and land owners.

== Political career ==
=== Leadership ===
In 2014, Osborne assumed the role of finance chairman of the Kentucky Republican Party following the resignation of KC Crosbie to run for lieutenant governor. In this role, Osborne worked to recruit candidates and raise funds across the state in an unsuccessful attempt to gain a majority in that year's House elections. Subsequently, Osborne ran for minority caucus chairman, narrowly losing by a one-vote margin.

After Republicans gained their first House majority in nearly a century in 2017, Osborne was elected as the chamber's first ever Republican speaker pro tempore. Following the resignation of speaker Jeff Hoover amidst a sexual harassment scandal, Osborne assumed the role of acting speaker in January 2018. He served in this capacity for a year, after which he was elected to the position permanently. Osborne's tenure as speaker is the longest of any Kentucky Republican.

=== Elections ===
- 2005 Kentucky's 59th House district incumbent Tim Feeley resigned from office following his appointment as a family court judge by Governor Ernie Fletcher. Subsequently, Fletcher called for a special election to be held on May 24, 2005. Osborne won the 2005 Special election with 2,676 votes (57.9%) against Democratic candidate Jody Curry.
- 2006 Osborne was challenged in the 2006 Republican Primary, winning with 3,677 votes (74.2%) and was unopposed for the November 7, 2006 General election, winning with 9,783 votes.
- 2008 Osborne was unopposed for both the 2008 Republican Primary and the November 4, 2008 General election, winning with 20,449 votes.
- 2010 Osborne was unopposed for both the May 18, 2010 Republican Primary and the November 2, 2010 General election, winning with 15,570 votes.
- 2012 Osborne was unopposed for both the May 22, 2012 Republican Primary, and the November 6, 2012 General election, winning with 20,623 votes.
- 2014 Osborne was unopposed for the 2014 Republican Primary, and won the November 4, 2014 General election with 12,235 votes against Democratic candidate James Victor Ewen.
- 2016 Osborne was unopposed for both the 2016 Republican Primary, and the 2016 Kentucky House of Representatives Election, winning with 19,159 votes.
- 2018 Osborne was unopposed for the 2018 Republican Primary, and won the 2018 Kentucky House of Representatives election, winning with 12,259 votes against Democratic candidate Diane Seaman and independent candidate Samantha Nicole Gerges.
- 2020 Osborne won the 2020 Republican Primary with 6,164 votes and was unopposed for the 2020 Kentucky House of Representatives election, winning with 21,687 votes.
- 2022 Osborne won the 2022 Republican Primary with 4,164 votes and was unopposed for the 2022 Kentucky House of Representatives election, winning with 12,655 votes.
- 2024 Osborne was unopposed in both the 2024 Republican Primary and the 2024 Kentucky House of Representatives election, winning the latter with 18,552 votes.

== Personal life and career ==
Osborne and his wife Lori reside at their home, Deerfield Farm, in Prospect. Operated as a thoroughbred racing and breeding operation, the couple's horses have competed across the nation.

He is a member of the Oldham County Chamber of Commerce, Farm Bureau, and the National Associations of Realtors, as well as the Realtors Land Institute. He is also a member of the American Saddlebred Horse Association, Thoroughbred Owners and Breeders Association, the U.S. Equestrian Federation, and the Kentucky Equine Education Project.

== Notes ==
Kentucky House of Representatives
Preceded by Jody Richards	Speaker pro tempore of the Kentucky House of Representatives; 2017–2019	Succeeded by David Meade
Political offices
Preceded by Jeff Hoover	Speaker of the Kentucky House of Representatives; 2018–present Acting: 2018–2019	Incumbent
