= Brandon Smith (politician) =

American politician

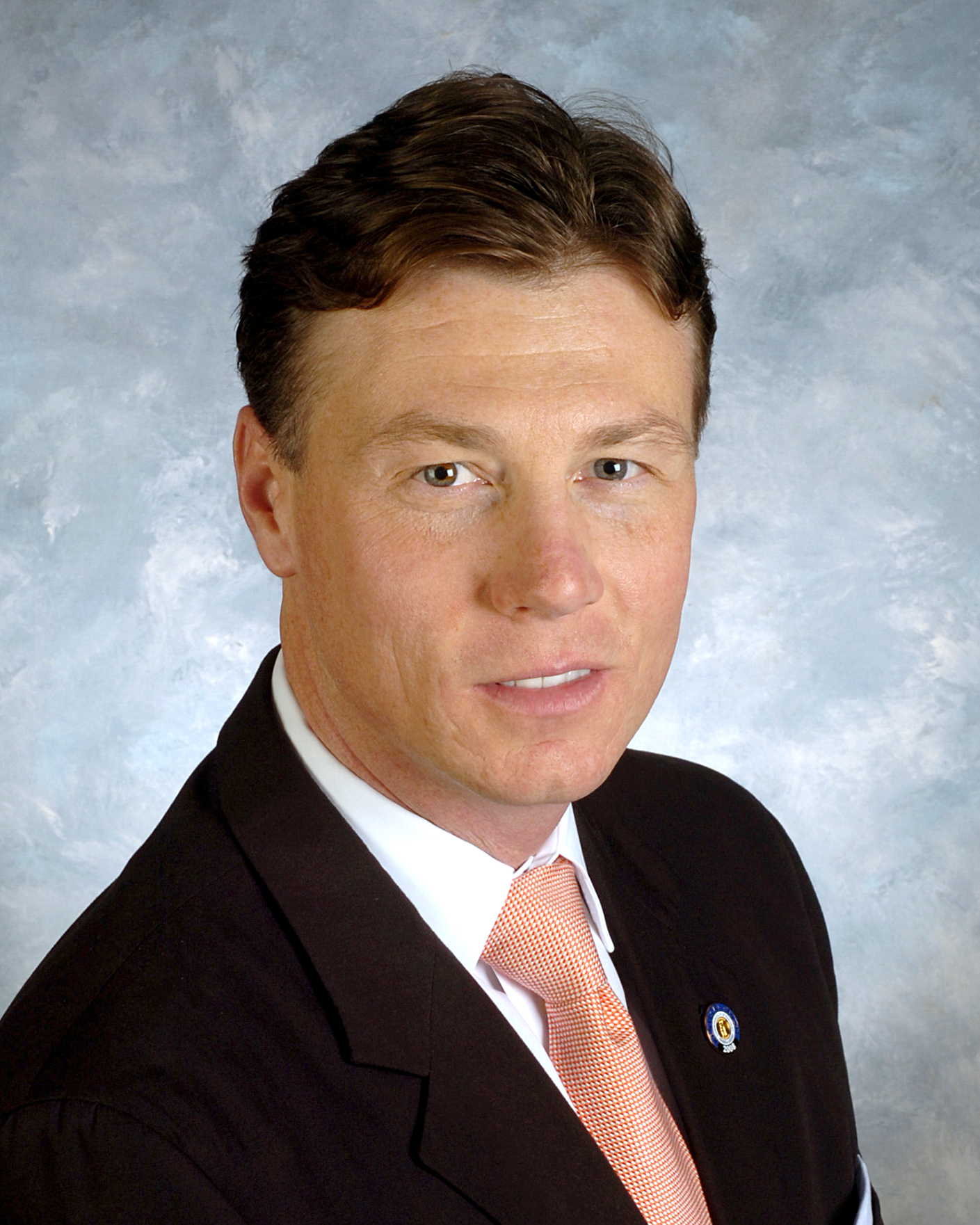
- Official portrait, 2008

Majority Whip of the Kentucky Senate
- In office January 8, 2013 – January 6, 2015
- Preceded by: Carroll Gibson
- Succeeded by: Jimmy Higdon

Member of the Kentucky Senate from the 30th district
- Incumbent
- Assumed office February 11, 2008
- Preceded by: Daniel Mongiardo

Member of the Kentucky House of Representatives from the 84th district
- In office January 1, 2001 – February 11, 2008
- Preceded by: Scott Alexander
- Succeeded by: Scott Alexander

Personal details
- Born: David Brandon Smith; June 14, 1967 (age 59) Hazard, Kentucky, U.S.
- Party: Republican
- Spouse: Laurel "Lolle"
- Children: 4
- Education: University of Kentucky
- Website: www.lrc.ky.gov/...

David Brandon Smith (born June 14, 1967) is an American businessman from Hazard, Kentucky who serves in the Commonwealth of Kentucky Senate. He is a Republican.

== Background ==
Born in Hazard, Smith is a 1991 graduate of the University of Kentucky with a B.A. in political science. He is the owner of Mohawk Energy, a small mining company based in Lexington; the company is unrelated to the Texas fracking supply corporation by the same name. He is a Presbyterian and a Freemason. Smith and his wife Laurel have five children.

== Public office ==
Smith served on the city commission of Hazard from 1993 to 1998. He was elected to District 84 of the Commonwealth of Kentucky House of Representatives in 2000, unseating Democratic incumbent Scott Alexander from Hazard Kentucky. and served there until February 5, 2008, when he was elected in a special election to the 30th district (Bell, Breathitt, Johnson, Leslie, Magoffin and Perry counties) of the Commonwealth Senate, to replace Daniel Mongiardo, newly elected as Lieutenant Governor of Kentucky (and himself a Hazard native and resident). Smith was reelected in 2010, 2014, 2018, and 2022.

=== Climate change and Mars ===
In 2014, Smith attracted local and eventually national news media attention when he stated during a legislative committee hearing:

As you [Energy and Environment Cabinet official] sit there in your chair with your data, we sit up here in ours with our data and our constituents and stuff behind us. I don't want to get into the debate about climate change, but I will simply point out that I think in academia we all agree that the temperature on Mars is exactly as it is here. Nobody will dispute that. Yet there are no coal mines on Mars. There are no factories on Mars that I'm aware of.

Despite Smith's assertion, the average temperature of Mars is colder than that of Earth by 138 degrees Fahrenheit. At the time of the senator's remarks, the Curiosity rover had last reported a high of −17 °C (1 °F), low −80 °C (−112 °F). The temperature in the capital city of Frankfort, Kentucky ranged from 21 °C (70 °F) to 27 °C (81 °F).

Smith later issued a response from his Twitter account that clarified his statement: "climate shift we see on earth comparable to those occurring on other planets in our solar system".

== Trouble with law ==
On January 6, 2015, just after 9:00 pm, Smith was arrested on Leestown Road in Frankfort. Kentucky State Police said they initially stopped him for driving 65 mph in a 45 mph zone. The trooper reported that he immediately smelled alcohol on Smith's breath when he approached the car. Smith scored a 0.088 on a breath test. A person at a 0.08 and above is considered drunk.

Smith's lawyer requested that the charges be missed based on an 1891 addition to the state constitution:

The members of the General Assembly shall, in all cases except treason, felony, breach or surety of the peace, be privileged from arrest during their attendance on the sessions of their respective Houses, and in going to and returning from the same; and for any speech or debate in either House they shall not be questioned in any other place...

Smith's arrest occurred on the first day of the legislative session. The judge has agreed to consider the motion and delayed the case.

A jury later found Smith not guilty of DUI but guilty on speeding charge. He was fined $40 plus court fees for going 20 miles per hour over the speed limit.
