= 2022 Kentucky House of Representatives election =

- November 8, 2022

All 100 seats in the Kentucky House of Representatives 51 seats needed for a majority
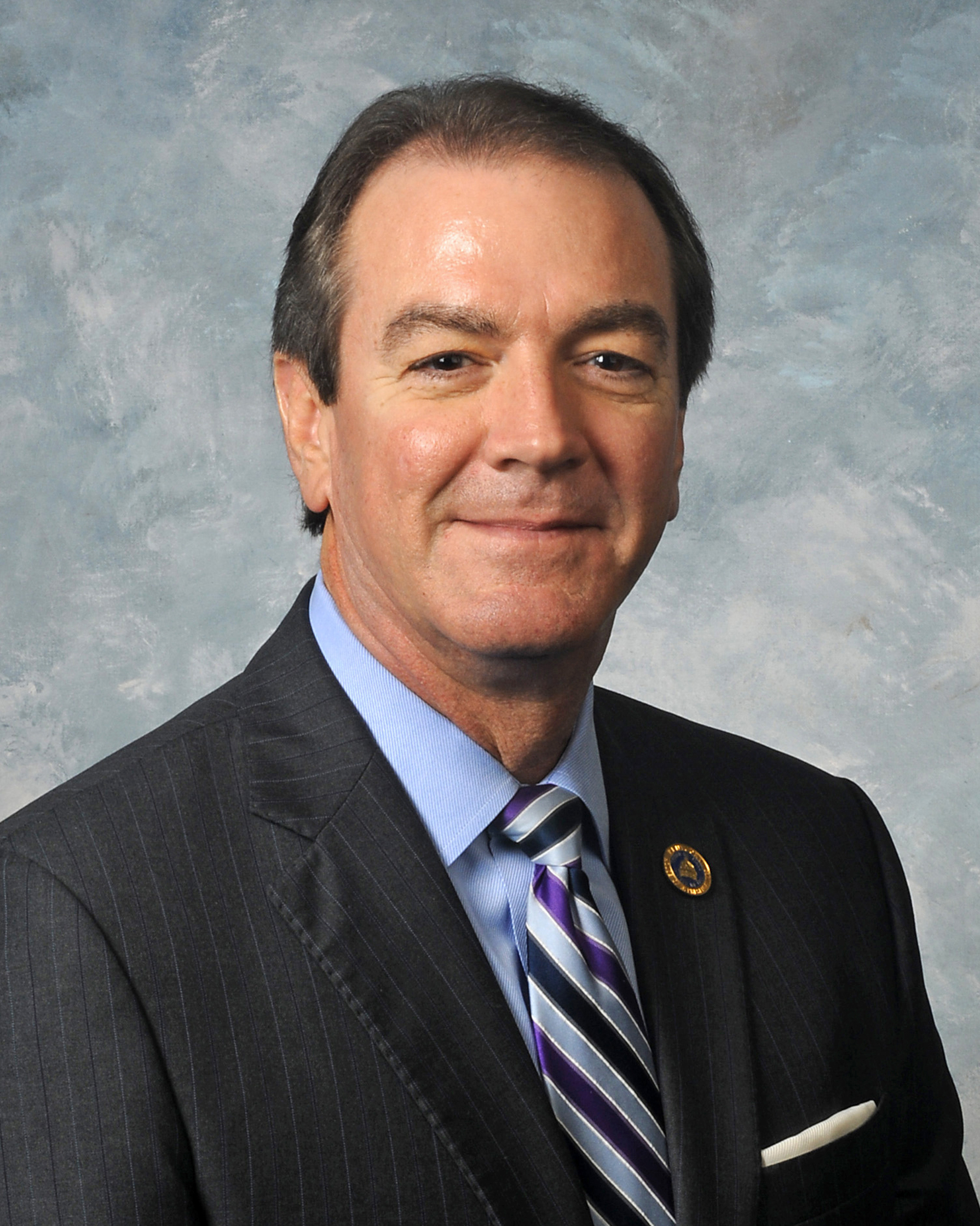

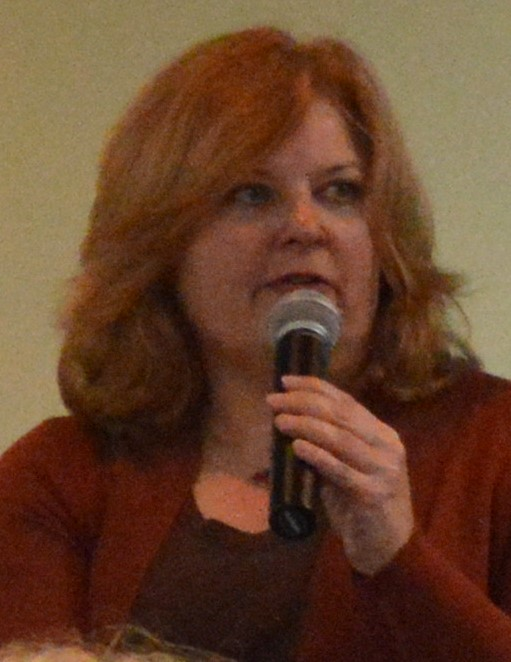
| | Majority party | Minority party |
|---|---|---|
| Leader | David Osborne | Joni Jenkins (retired) |
| Party | Republican | Democratic |
| Leader since | January 8, 2018 | January 7, 2020 |
| Leader's seat | 59th – Prospect | 44th – Shively |
| Last election | 75 | 25 |
| Seats won | 80 | 20 |
| Seat change | ▲5 | ▼5 |
| Popular vote | 904,806 | 377,805 |
| Percentage | 70.41% | 29.40% |
| Swing | ▲7.77% | ▼6.70% |
- Republican hold Republican gain Democratic hold Democratic gain 50–60% 60–70% 70–80% 80–90% >90% 50–60% 60–70% 70–80% >90%
Speaker before election
David Osborne
Republican
Elected Speaker
David Osborne
Republican

The 2022 Kentucky House of Representatives election was held on November 8, 2022. The Republican and Democratic primary elections were held on May 17. All 100 seats of the house were up for election. Republicans increased their majority in the chamber, gaining five seats.

A numbered map of the house districts can be viewed here.

== Overview ==
| Party | Candidates | | Votes | % | Seats | | |
| Party | Opposed | Unopposed | Votes | % | Before | Won | +/− |
|---|---|---|---|---|---|---|---|
| Republican | 89 | 39 | 904,806 | 70.41 | 75 | 80 | +5 |
| Democratic | 57 | 11 | 377,805 | 29.40 | 25 | 20 | -5 |
| Write-in | 5 | 0 | 2,508 | 0.20 | 0 | 0 | - |
| Total | 151 | 50 | 1,285,119 | 100.00 | 100 | 100 | ±0 |
Source: Kentucky Secretary of State

== Retiring incumbents ==
A total of 14 representatives (six Democrats and eight Republicans) retired, three of whom (two Democrats and one Republican) ran for other offices.

=== Democratic ===
1. 34th: Mary Lou Marzian (Louisville): Retired.
2. 38th: McKenzie Cantrell (Louisville): Retired to unsuccessfully run for the Kentucky Court of Appeals.
3. 41st: Attica Scott (Louisville): Retired to unsuccessfully run for Kentucky's 3rd congressional district.
4. 44th: Joni Jenkins (Shively): Retired.
5. 75th: Kelly Flood (Lexington): Retired.
6. 79th: Susan Westrom (Lexington): Retired.

=== Republican ===
1. 15th: Melinda Gibbons Prunty (Belton): Retired.
2. 17th: Steve Sheldon (Bowling Green): Retired.
3. 21st: Bart Rowland (Tompkinsville): Retired.
4. 25th: Jim DuPlessis (Elizabethtown): Retired.
5. 36th: Jerry T. Miller (Eastwood): Retired.
6. 50th: Chad McCoy (Bardstown): Retired.
7. 68th: Joseph Fischer (Fort Thomas): Retired to unsuccessfully run for the Kentucky Supreme Court.
8. 82nd: Regina Bunch (Williamsburg): Retired.

== Incumbents defeated ==
Six incumbents lost renomination in the primary election and five incumbents lost reelection in the general election.

=== In the primary election ===
==== Democrats ====
One Democrat lost renomination.

1. 30th: Tom Burch (first elected in 1971) lost renomination to Daniel Grossberg, who won the general election.

==== Republicans ====
Five Republicans lost renomination.

1. 12th: Lynn Bechler (first elected in 2012) lost a redistricting race to fellow incumbent Jim Gooch Jr., who won the general election.
2. 60th: Sal Santoro (first elected in 2006) lost renomination to Marianne Proctor, who won the general election.
3. 66th: C. Ed Massey (first elected in 2018) lost renomination to Steve Rawlings, who won the general election.
4. 69th: Adam Koenig (first elected in 2006) lost renomination to Steven Doan, who won the general election.
5. 97th: Norma Kirk-McCormick (first elected in 2020) lost a redistricting race to fellow incumbent Bobby McCool, who won the general election.

=== In the general election ===
==== Democrats ====
Five Democrats lost reelection to Republicans.

1. 20th: Patti Minter (first elected in 2018) lost to Kevin Jackson.
2. 28th: Charles Miller (first elected in 1998) lost to Jared Bauman.
3. 37th: Jeffery Donohue (first elected in 2012) lost to Emily Callaway.
4. 65th: Buddy Wheatley (first elected in 2018) lost to Stephanie Dietz.
5. 94th: Angie Hatton (first elected in 2016) lost to Jacob Justice.

==== Republicans ====
No Republicans lost reelection.

== Redistricting ==
2022 was the first election following the decennial redistricting, which moved six incumbents into different districts. Five districts had two incumbents grouped together, while five districts had no incumbent.

| District | Incumbent before redistricting | Incumbent(s) after redistricting |
|---|---|---|
| 4th | Lynn Bechler | Open seat |
| 12th | Jim Gooch Jr. | Lynn Bechler; Jim Gooch Jr. |
| 31st | Josie Raymond | Open seat |
| 34th | Mary Lou Marzian | Open seat |
| 35th | Lisa Willner | McKenzie Cantrell; Lisa Willner |
| 38th | McKenzie Cantrell | Open seat |
| 41st | Attica Scott | Mary Lou Marzian; Josie Raymond |
| 42nd | Keturah Herron | Keturah Herron; Attica Scott |
| 93rd | Norma Kirk-McCormick | Open seat |
| 97th | Bobby McCool | Norma Kirk-McCormick; Bobby McCool |

== Summary by district ==
Certified results by the Kentucky Secretary of State are available online for the primary election and general election.

| District | Incumbent | Party | Elected | Party |
|---|---|---|---|---|
| 1 | Steven Rudy | Rep | Steven Rudy | Rep |
| 2 | Richard Heath | Rep | Richard Heath | Rep |
| 3 | Randy Bridges | Rep | Randy Bridges | Rep |
| 4 | Lynn Bechler | Rep | Wade Williams | Rep |
| 5 | Mary Beth Imes | Rep | Mary Beth Imes | Rep |
| 6 | Chris Freeland | Rep | Chris Freeland | Rep |
| 7 | Suzanne Miles | Rep | Suzanne Miles | Rep |
| 8 | Walker Thomas | Rep | Walker Thomas | Rep |
| 9 | Myron Dossett | Rep | Myron Dossett | Rep |
| 10 | Josh Calloway | Rep | Josh Calloway | Rep |
| 11 | Jonathan Dixon | Rep | Jonathan Dixon | Rep |
| 12 | Jim Gooch Jr. | Rep | Jim Gooch Jr. | Rep |
| 13 | DJ Johnson | Rep | DJ Johnson | Rep |
| 14 | Scott Lewis | Rep | Scott Lewis | Rep |
| 15 | Melinda Gibbons Prunty | Rep | Rebecca Raymer | Rep |
| 16 | Jason Petrie | Rep | Jason Petrie | Rep |
| 17 | Steve Sheldon | Rep | Robert Duvall | Rep |
| 18 | Samara Heavrin | Rep | Samara Heavrin | Rep |
| 19 | Michael Meredith | Rep | Michael Meredith | Rep |
| 20 | Patti Minter | Dem | Kevin Jackson | Rep |
| 21 | Bart Rowland | Rep | Amy Neighbors | Rep |
| 22 | Shawn McPherson | Rep | Shawn McPherson | Rep |
| 23 | Steve Riley | Rep | Steve Riley | Rep |
| 24 | Brandon Reed | Rep | Brandon Reed | Rep |
| 25 | Jim DuPlessis | Rep | Steve Bratcher | Rep |
| 26 | Russell Webber | Rep | Russell Webber | Rep |
| 27 | Nancy Tate | Rep | Nancy Tate | Rep |
| 28 | Charles Miller | Dem | Jared Bauman | Rep |
| 29 | Kevin Bratcher | Rep | Kevin Bratcher | Rep |
| 30 | Tom Burch | Dem | Daniel Grossberg | Dem |
| 31 | Josie Raymond | Dem | Susan Tyler Witten | Rep |
| 32 | Tina Bojanowski | Dem | Tina Bojanowski | Dem |
| 33 | Jason Nemes | Rep | Jason Nemes | Rep |
| 34 | Mary Lou Marzian | Dem | Sarah Stalker | Dem |
| 35 | Lisa Willner | Dem | Lisa Willner | Dem |
| 36 | Jerry T. Miller | Rep | John Hodgson | Rep |
| 37 | Jeffery Donohue | Dem | Emily Callaway | Rep |
| 38 | McKenzie Cantrell | Dem | Rachel Roarx | Dem |
| 39 | Matt Lockett | Rep | Matt Lockett | Rep |
| 40 | Nima Kulkarni | Dem | Nima Kulkarni | Dem |
| 41 | Attica Scott | Dem | Josie Raymond | Dem |
| 42 | Keturah Herron | Dem | Keturah Herron | Dem |
| 43 | Pamela Stevenson | Dem | Pamela Stevenson | Dem |
| 44 | Joni Jenkins | Dem | Beverly Chester-Burton | Dem |
| 45 | Killian Timoney | Rep | Killian Timoney | Rep |
| 46 | Al Gentry | Dem | Al Gentry | Dem |
| 47 | Felicia Rabourn | Rep | Felicia Rabourn | Rep |
| 48 | Ken Fleming | Rep | Ken Fleming | Rep |
| 49 | Thomas Huff | Rep | Thomas Huff | Rep |
| 50 | Chad McCoy | Rep | Candy Massaroni | Rep |
| 51 | Michael Pollock | Rep | Michael Pollock | Rep |
| 52 | Ken Upchurch | Rep | Ken Upchurch | Rep |
| 53 | James Tipton | Rep | James Tipton | Rep |
| 54 | Daniel Elliott | Rep | Daniel Elliott | Rep |
| 55 | Kim King | Rep | Kim King | Rep |
| 56 | Daniel Fister | Rep | Daniel Fister | Rep |
| 57 | Derrick Graham | Dem | Derrick Graham | Dem |
| 58 | Jennifer Decker | Rep | Jennifer Decker | Rep |
| 59 | David Osborne | Rep | David Osborne | Rep |
| 60 | Sal Santoro | Rep | Marianne Proctor | Rep |
| 61 | Savannah Maddox | Rep | Savannah Maddox | Rep |
| 62 | Phillip Pratt | Rep | Phillip Pratt | Rep |
| 63 | Kim Banta | Rep | Kim Banta | Rep |
| 64 | Kimberly Poore Moser | Rep | Kimberly Poore Moser | Rep |
| 65 | Buddy Wheatley | Dem | Stephanie Dietz | Rep |
| 66 | C. Ed Massey | Rep | Steve Rawlings | Rep |
| 67 | Rachel Roberts | Dem | Rachel Roberts | Dem |
| 68 | Joseph Fischer | Rep | Mike Clines | Rep |
| 69 | Adam Koenig | Rep | Steven Doan | Rep |
| 70 | William Lawrence | Rep | William Lawrence | Rep |
| 71 | Josh Bray | Rep | Josh Bray | Rep |
| 72 | Matthew Koch | Rep | Matthew Koch | Rep |
| 73 | Ryan Dotson | Rep | Ryan Dotson | Rep |
| 74 | David Hale | Rep | David Hale | Rep |
| 75 | Kelly Flood | Dem | Lindsey Burke | Dem |
| 76 | Ruth Ann Palumbo | Dem | Ruth Ann Palumbo | Dem |
| 77 | George Brown Jr. | Dem | George Brown Jr. | Dem |
| 78 | Mark Hart | Rep | Mark Hart | Rep |
| 79 | Susan Westrom | Dem | Chad Aull | Dem |
| 80 | David Meade | Rep | David Meade | Rep |
| 81 | Deanna Frazier | Rep | Deanna Frazier | Rep |
| 82 | Regina Bunch | Rep | Nick Wilson | Rep |
| 83 | Josh Branscum | Rep | Josh Branscum | Rep |
| 84 | Chris Fugate | Rep | Chris Fugate | Rep |
| 85 | Shane Baker | Rep | Shane Baker | Rep |
| 86 | Tom Smith | Rep | Tom Smith | Rep |
| 87 | Adam Bowling | Rep | Adam Bowling | Rep |
| 88 | Cherlynn Stevenson | Dem | Cherlynn Stevenson | Dem |
| 89 | Timmy Truett | Rep | Timmy Truett | Rep |
| 90 | Derek Lewis | Rep | Derek Lewis | Rep |
| 91 | Bill Wesley | Rep | Bill Wesley | Rep |
| 92 | John Blanton | Rep | John Blanton | Rep |
| 93 | Norma Kirk-McCormick | Rep | Lamin Swann | Dem |
| 94 | Angie Hatton | Dem | Jacob Justice | Rep |
| 95 | Ashley Tackett Laferty | Dem | Ashley Tackett Laferty | Dem |
| 96 | Patrick Flannery | Rep | Patrick Flannery | Rep |
| 97 | Bobby McCool | Rep | Bobby McCool | Rep |
| 98 | Danny Bentley | Rep | Danny Bentley | Rep |
| 99 | Richard White | Rep | Richard White | Rep |
| 100 | Scott Sharp | Rep | Scott Sharp | Rep |

== Crossover seats ==
Seven districts voted for one party in the 2020 presidential election and another in the 2020 house election. Following the redistricting of the house, an additional six incumbents represented districts which had voted for the other party for president in 2020, while three of the seven representatives in crossover seats now represented a district which had voted for the same party for president.

=== Democratic ===
Eight districts voted for Donald Trump in 2020 but had Democratic incumbents:

| District | | | Incumbent | | |
| # | Trump/Biden margin of victory in old district | Trump margin of victory in new district | Member | Party | Incumbent margin of victory in 2020 |
|---|---|---|---|---|---|
| 20 | D+10.73 | R+3.75 | Patti Minter | Democratic | D+39.86 (Note: No Republican candidate filed for the 20th district; Minter defeated independent candidate Leanette Lopez.) |
| 28 | R+10.96 | R+11.01 | Charles Miller | Democratic | Uncontested |
| 37 | D+1.94 | R+11.96 | Jeffery Donohue | Democratic | D+8.95 |
| 65 | D+17.05 | R+2.17 | Buddy Wheatley | Democratic | D+20.96 |
| 67 | D+2.77 | R+0.08 | Rachel Roberts | Democratic | D+5.66 |
| 88 | D+4.04 | R+4.70 | Cherlynn Stevenson | Democratic | D+3.00 |
| 94 | R+58.56 | R+62.32 | Angie Hatton | Democratic | Uncontested |
| 95 | R+52.37 | R+51.14 | Ashley Tackett Laferty | Democratic | D+19.98 |

=== Republican ===
Two districts voted for Joe Biden in 2020 but had Republican incumbents:

| District | | | Incumbent | | |
| # | Trump/Biden margin of victory in old district | Biden margin of victory in new district | Member | Party | Incumbent margin of victory in 2020 |
|---|---|---|---|---|---|
| 48 | D+8.78 | D+1.76 | Ken Fleming | Republican | R+2.16 |
| 93 (Note: Redistricting moved the 93rd district from eastern Kentucky (Martin and Pike Counties) to Lexington. Kirk-McCormick unsuccessfully ran for the Republican nomination in the 97th district.) | R+65.88 | D+16.75 | Norma Kirk-McCormick | Republican | R+26.20 |

=== Former crossover seats ===
| District | | | Incumbent | | |
| # | Trump/Biden margin of victory in old district | Trump/Biden margin of victory in new district | Member | Party | Incumbent margin of victory in 2020 |
|---|---|---|---|---|---|
| 33 | D+1.82 | R+7.69 | Jason Nemes | Republican | R+8.29 |
| 45 | D+3.61 | R+3.44 | Killian Timoney | Republican | R+2.19 |
| 57 | R+0.58 | D+2.59 | Derrick Graham | Democratic | D+22.79 |

== Predictions ==
| Source | Ranking | As of |
|---|---|---|
| Sabato's Crystal Ball | Safe R | May 19, 2022 |

== Closest races ==
Seats where the margin of victory was under 10%:

1. District 88, 0.23%
2. District 65, 2.09% (gain)
3. District 38, 2.97%
4. District 31, 4.03% (gain)
5. District 93, 7.68% (gain)
6. District 48, 8.30%
7. District 20, 9.08% (gain)
8. District 46, 9.91%

== Special elections ==
=== District 51 special ===
Michael Pollock was elected in November 2021 to fill the vacancy caused by the death of John Carney in July 2021.

2021 Kentucky House of Representatives 51st district special election
| Party | Candidate | Votes | % |
|---|---|---|---|
| Republican | Michael Pollock | 5,217 | 73.7 |
| Democratic | Edwin Rogers | 1,700 | 24.0 |
| Independent | Timothy Shafer | 161 | 2.3 |
| Total votes | | 7,078 | 100.0 |
| Republican hold | | | |

=== District 89 special ===
Timmy Truett was elected in November 2021 to fill the vacancy caused by the resignation of Robert Goforth in August 2021.

2021 Kentucky House of Representatives 89th district special election
| Party | Candidate | Votes | % |
|---|---|---|---|
| Republican | Timmy Truett | 3,859 | 77.9 |
| Democratic | Maetinee Suramek | 1,097 | 22.1 |
| Total votes | | 4,956 | 100.0 |
| Republican hold | | | |

=== District 42 special ===
Keturah Herron was elected in February 2022 to fill the vacancy caused by the resignation of Reginald Meeks in December 2021.

2022 Kentucky House of Representatives 42nd district special election
| Party | Candidate | Votes | % |
|---|---|---|---|
| Democratic | Keturah Herron | 1,950 | 94.2 |
| Republican | Judy Martin Stallard | 119 | 5.8 |
| Total votes | | 2,069 | 100.0 |
| Democratic hold | | | |

== District 1 ==
Incumbent representative Steven Rudy won reelection, defeating primary election challenger Christopher Tucker.

=== Republican primary ===
==== Candidates ====
===== Nominee =====
- Steven Rudy, incumbent representative

===== Eliminated in primary =====
- Christopher Tucker

==== Results ====
Republican primary results
| Party | Candidate | Votes | % |
|---|---|---|---|
| Republican | Steven Rudy | 2,176 | 61.0 |
| Republican | Christopher Tucker | 1,394 | 39.0 |
| Total votes | | 3,570 | 100.0 |

=== General election ===
==== Results ====
2022 Kentucky House of Representatives 1st district election
| Party | Candidate | Votes | % |
|---|---|---|---|
| Republican | Steven Rudy | Unopposed | |
| Total votes | | 12,590 | 100.0 |
| Republican hold | | | |

== District 2 ==
Incumbent representative Richard Heath won reelection, defeating write-in candidate Kimberly Holloway.

=== Republican primary ===
==== Candidates ====
===== Nominee =====
- Richard Heath, incumbent representative

=== General election ===
==== Results ====
2022 Kentucky House of Representatives 2nd district election
| Party | Candidate | Votes | % |
|---|---|---|---|
| Republican | Richard Heath | 10,922 | 82.6 |
| Write-in | Kimberly Holloway | 2,300 | 17.4 |
| Total votes | | 13,222 | 100.0 |
| Republican hold | | | |

== District 3 ==
Incumbent representative Randy Bridges won reelection unopposed.

=== Republican primary ===
==== Candidates ====
===== Nominee =====
- Randy Bridges, incumbent representative

=== General election ===
==== Results ====
2022 Kentucky House of Representatives 3rd district election
| Party | Candidate | Votes | % |
|---|---|---|---|
| Republican | Randy Bridges | Unopposed | |
| Total votes | | 10,309 | 100.0 |
| Republican hold | | | |

== District 4 ==
Incumbent representative Lynn Bechler was redistricted to the 12th district and was succeeded by Wade Williams.

=== Democratic primary ===
==== Candidates ====
===== Nominee =====
- Byron Hobgood

=== Republican primary ===
==== Candidates ====
===== Nominee =====
- Wade Williams

===== Eliminated in primary =====
- David Sharp

==== Results ====
Republican primary results
| Party | Candidate | Votes | % |
|---|---|---|---|
| Republican | Wade Williams | 1,665 | 66.6 |
| Republican | David Sharp | 835 | 33.4 |
| Total votes | | 2,500 | 100.0 |

=== General election ===
==== Results ====
2022 Kentucky House of Representatives 4th district election
| Party | Candidate | Votes | % |
|---|---|---|---|
| Republican | Wade Williams | 10,624 | 72.0 |
| Democratic | Byron Hobgood | 4,140 | 28.0 |
| Total votes | | 14,764 | 100.0 |
| Republican hold | | | |

== District 5 ==
Incumbent representative Mary Beth Imes won reelection unopposed.

=== Republican primary ===
==== Candidates ====
===== Nominee =====
- Mary Beth Imes, incumbent representative

=== General election ===
==== Results ====
2022 Kentucky House of Representatives 5th district election
| Party | Candidate | Votes | % |
|---|---|---|---|
| Republican | Mary Beth Imes | Unopposed | |
| Total votes | | 11,181 | 100.0 |
| Republican hold | | | |

== District 6 ==
Incumbent representative Chris Freeland won reelection unopposed.

=== Republican primary ===
==== Candidates ====
===== Nominee =====
- Chris Freeland, incumbent representative

=== General election ===
==== Results ====
2022 Kentucky House of Representatives 6th district election
| Party | Candidate | Votes | % |
|---|---|---|---|
| Republican | Chris Freeland | Unopposed | |
| Total votes | | 14,298 | 100.0 |
| Republican hold | | | |

== District 7 ==
Incumbent representative Suzanne Miles won reelection unopposed.

=== Republican primary ===
==== Candidates ====
===== Nominee =====
- Suzanne Miles, incumbent representative

=== General election ===
==== Results ====
2022 Kentucky House of Representatives 7th district election
| Party | Candidate | Votes | % |
|---|---|---|---|
| Republican | Suzanne Miles | Unopposed | |
| Total votes | | 11,211 | 100.0 |
| Republican hold | | | |

== District 8 ==
Incumbent representative Walker Thomas won reelection, defeating primary and general election challengers.

=== Democratic primary ===
==== Candidates ====
===== Nominee =====
- Pam Dossett

=== Republican primary ===
==== Candidates ====
===== Nominee =====
- Walker Thomas, incumbent representative

===== Eliminated in primary =====
- Larry Curling

==== Results ====
Republican primary results
| Party | Candidate | Votes | % |
|---|---|---|---|
| Republican | Walker Thomas | 2,120 | 57.9 |
| Republican | Larry Curling | 1,542 | 42.1 |
| Total votes | | 3,662 | 100.0 |

=== General election ===
==== Results ====
2022 Kentucky House of Representatives 8th district election
| Party | Candidate | Votes | % |
|---|---|---|---|
| Republican | Walker Thomas | 9,573 | 68.1 |
| Democratic | Pam Dossett | 4,477 | 31.9 |
| Total votes | | 14,050 | 100.0 |
| Republican hold | | | |

== District 9 ==
Incumbent representative Myron Dossett won reelection, defeating Democratic candidate Bianca Crockam.

=== Democratic primary ===
==== Candidates ====
===== Nominee =====
- Bianca Crockam

=== Republican primary ===
==== Candidates ====
===== Nominee =====
- Myron Dossett, incumbent representative

=== General election ===
==== Results ====
2022 Kentucky House of Representatives 9th district election
| Party | Candidate | Votes | % |
|---|---|---|---|
| Republican | Myron Dossett | 5,123 | 68.6 |
| Democratic | Bianca Crockam | 2,349 | 31.4 |
| Total votes | | 7,472 | 100.0 |
| Republican hold | | | |

== District 10 ==
Incumbent representative Josh Calloway won reelection, defeating write-in candidate John Whipple.

=== Republican primary ===
==== Candidates ====
===== Nominee =====
- Josh Calloway, incumbent representative

=== General election ===
==== Results ====
2022 Kentucky House of Representatives 10th district election
| Party | Candidate | Votes | % |
|---|---|---|---|
| Republican | Josh Calloway | 11,516 | 98.8 |
| Write-in | John Whipple | 135 | 1.2 |
| Total votes | | 11,651 | 100.0 |
| Republican hold | | | |

== District 11 ==
Incumbent representative Jonathan Dixon won reelection, defeating Democratic candidate Velvet Dowdy.

=== Democratic primary ===
==== Candidates ====
===== Nominee =====
- Velvet Dowdy

=== Republican primary ===
==== Candidates ====
===== Nominee =====
- Jonathan Dixon, incumbent representative

=== General election ===
==== Results ====
2022 Kentucky House of Representatives 11th district election
| Party | Candidate | Votes | % |
|---|---|---|---|
| Republican | Jonathan Dixon | 8,850 | 63.3 |
| Democratic | Velvet Dowdy | 5,142 | 36.7 |
| Total votes | | 13,992 | 100.0 |
| Republican hold | | | |

== District 12 ==
Incumbent representative Jim Gooch Jr. was challenged for the Republican nomination by representative Lynn Bechler, who had been redistricted from the 4th district. Gooch defeated Bechler and Democratic candidate Alan Lossner in the general election.

=== Democratic primary ===
==== Candidates ====
===== Nominee =====
- Alan Lossner

=== Republican primary ===
==== Candidates ====
===== Nominee =====
- Jim Gooch Jr., incumbent representative

===== Eliminated in primary =====
- Lynn Bechler, representative from the 4th district (2013–2023)

==== Results ====
Republican primary results
| Party | Candidate | Votes | % |
|---|---|---|---|
| Republican | Jim Gooch Jr. | 2,442 | 55.3 |
| Republican | Lynn Bechler | 1,977 | 44.7 |
| Total votes | | 4,419 | 100.0 |

=== General election ===
==== Results ====
2022 Kentucky House of Representatives 12th district election
| Party | Candidate | Votes | % |
|---|---|---|---|
| Republican | Jim Gooch Jr. | 12,131 | 77.5 |
| Democratic | Alan Lossner | 3,518 | 22.5 |
| Total votes | | 15,649 | 100.0 |
| Republican hold | | | |

== District 13 ==
Incumbent representative DJ Johnson won reelection, defeating Democratic candidate Michael Johnson.

=== Democratic primary ===
==== Candidates ====
===== Nominee =====
- Michael Johnson

=== Republican primary ===
==== Candidates ====
===== Nominee =====
- DJ Johnson, incumbent representative

=== General election ===
==== Results ====
2022 Kentucky House of Representatives 13th district election
| Party | Candidate | Votes | % |
|---|---|---|---|
| Republican | DJ Johnson | 8,387 | 63.3 |
| Democratic | Michael Johnson | 4,870 | 36.7 |
| Total votes | | 13,257 | 100.0 |
| Republican hold | | | |

== District 14 ==
Incumbent representative Scott Lewis won reelection unopposed.

=== Republican primary ===
==== Candidates ====
===== Nominee =====
- Scott Lewis, incumbent representative

=== General election ===
==== Results ====
2022 Kentucky House of Representatives 14th district election
| Party | Candidate | Votes | % |
|---|---|---|---|
| Republican | Scott Lewis | Unopposed | |
| Total votes | | 12,313 | 100.0 |
| Republican hold | | | |

== District 15 ==
Incumbent representative Melinda Gibbons Prunty did not seek reelection. She was succeeded by Republican Rebecca Raymer.

=== Democratic primary ===
==== Candidates ====
===== Nominee =====
- Britt Hernandez-Stevenson

=== Republican primary ===
==== Candidates ====
===== Nominee =====
- Rebecca Raymer

===== Eliminated in primary =====
- Timothy Dukes

==== Results ====
Republican primary results
| Party | Candidate | Votes | % |
|---|---|---|---|
| Republican | Rebecca Raymer | 2,932 | 61.5 |
| Republican | Timothy Dukes | 1,836 | 38.5 |
| Total votes | | 4,768 | 100.0 |

=== General election ===
==== Results ====
2022 Kentucky House of Representatives 15th district election
| Party | Candidate | Votes | % |
|---|---|---|---|
| Republican | Rebecca Raymer | 10,664 | 74.1 |
| Democratic | Britt Hernandez-Stevenson | 3,729 | 25.9 |
| Total votes | | 14,393 | 100.0 |
| Republican hold | | | |

== District 16 ==
Incumbent representative Jason Petrie won reelection unopposed.

=== Republican primary ===
==== Candidates ====
===== Nominee =====
- Jason Petrie, incumbent representative

=== General election ===
==== Results ====
2022 Kentucky House of Representatives 16th district election
| Party | Candidate | Votes | % |
|---|---|---|---|
| Republican | Jason Petrie | Unopposed | |
| Total votes | | 10,847 | 100.0 |
| Republican hold | | | |

== District 17 ==
Incumbent representative Steve Sheldon did not seek reelection. He was succeeded by Republican Robert Duvall.

=== Republican primary ===
==== Candidates ====
===== Nominee =====
- Robert Duvall

=== General election ===
==== Results ====
2022 Kentucky House of Representatives 17th district election
| Party | Candidate | Votes | % |
|---|---|---|---|
| Republican | Robert Duvall | Unopposed | |
| Total votes | | 8,825 | 100.0 |
| Republican hold | | | |

== District 18 ==
Incumbent representative Samara Heavrin won reelection, defeating primary election challenger Jacob Clark.

=== Republican primary ===
==== Candidates ====
===== Nominee =====
- Samara Heavrin, incumbent representative

===== Eliminated in primary =====
- Jacob Clark

==== Results ====
Republican primary results
| Party | Candidate | Votes | % |
|---|---|---|---|
| Republican | Samara Heavrin | 3,181 | 57.3 |
| Republican | Jacob Clark | 2,366 | 42.7 |
| Total votes | | 5,547 | 100.0 |

=== General election ===
==== Results ====
2022 Kentucky House of Representatives 18th district election
| Party | Candidate | Votes | % |
|---|---|---|---|
| Republican | Samara Heavrin | Unopposed | |
| Total votes | | 11,423 | 100.0 |
| Republican hold | | | |

== District 19 ==
Incumbent representative Michael Meredith won reelection unopposed.

=== Republican primary ===
==== Candidates ====
===== Nominee =====
- Michael Meredith, incumbent representative

=== General election ===
==== Results ====
2022 Kentucky House of Representatives 19th district election
| Party | Candidate | Votes | % |
|---|---|---|---|
| Republican | Michael Meredith | Unopposed | |
| Total votes | | 11,852 | 100.0 |
| Republican hold | | | |

== District 20 ==
Incumbent representative Patti Minter was defeated for reelection by Republican Kevin Jackson.

=== Democratic primary ===
==== Candidates ====
===== Nominee =====
- Patti Minter, incumbent representative

=== Republican primary ===
==== Candidates ====
===== Nominee =====
- Kevin Jackson

===== Eliminated in primary =====
- Leanette Lopez

==== Results ====
Republican primary results
| Party | Candidate | Votes | % |
|---|---|---|---|
| Republican | Kevin Jackson | 2,152 | 85.7 |
| Republican | Leanette Lopez | 359 | 14.3 |
| Total votes | | 2,511 | 100.0 |

=== General election ===
==== Results ====
2022 Kentucky House of Representatives 20th district election
| Party | Candidate | Votes | % |
|---|---|---|---|
| Republican | Kevin Jackson | 6,762 | 54.5 |
| Democratic | Patti Minter | 5,636 | 45.5 |
| Total votes | | 12,398 | 100.0 |
| Republican gain from Democratic | | | |

== District 21 ==
Incumbent representative Bart Rowland did not seek reelection. He was succeeded by Republican Amy Neighbors.

=== Republican primary ===
==== Candidates ====
===== Nominee =====
- Amy Neighbors

===== Eliminated in primary =====
- Jimmy Carter
- Terry Dubree
- Joshua Ellis
- Daniel Glass

==== Results ====
Republican primary results
| Party | Candidate | Votes | % |
|---|---|---|---|
| Republican | Amy Neighbors | 3,609 | 33.2 |
| Republican | Jimmy Carter | 3,313 | 30.5 |
| Republican | Joshua Ellis | 1,494 | 13.7 |
| Republican | Terry Dubree | 1,375 | 12.6 |
| Republican | Daniel Glass | 1,079 | 9.9 |
| Total votes | | 10,870 | 100.0 |

=== General election ===
==== Results ====
2022 Kentucky House of Representatives 21st district election
| Party | Candidate | Votes | % |
|---|---|---|---|
| Republican | Amy Neighbors | Unopposed | |
| Total votes | | 13,283 | 100.0 |
| Republican hold | | | |

== District 22 ==
Incumbent representative Shawn McPherson won reelection unopposed.

=== Republican primary ===
==== Candidates ====
===== Nominee =====
- Shawn McPherson, incumbent representative

=== General election ===
==== Results ====
2022 Kentucky House of Representatives 22nd district election
| Party | Candidate | Votes | % |
|---|---|---|---|
| Republican | Shawn McPherson | Unopposed | |
| Total votes | | 11,679 | 100.0 |
| Republican hold | | | |

== District 23 ==
Incumbent representative Steve Riley won reelection unopposed.

=== Republican primary ===
==== Candidates ====
===== Nominee =====
- Steve Riley, incumbent representative

=== General election ===
==== Results ====
2022 Kentucky House of Representatives 23rd district election
| Party | Candidate | Votes | % |
|---|---|---|---|
| Republican | Steve Riley | Unopposed | |
| Total votes | | 11,747 | 100.0 |
| Republican hold | | | |

== District 24 ==
Incumbent representative Brandon Reed won reelection, defeating primary and general election challengers.

=== Democratic primary ===
==== Candidates ====
===== Nominee =====
- Keith Pruitt

===== Eliminated in primary =====
- John Pennington

==== Results ====
Democratic primary results
| Party | Candidate | Votes | % |
|---|---|---|---|
| Democratic | Keith Pruitt | 1,667 | 70.0 |
| Democratic | John Pennington | 714 | 30.0 |
| Total votes | | 2,381 | 100.0 |

=== Republican primary ===
==== Candidates ====
===== Nominee =====
- Brandon Reed, incumbent representative

===== Eliminated in primary =====
- Courtney Gilbert

==== Results ====
Republican primary results
| Party | Candidate | Votes | % |
|---|---|---|---|
| Republican | Brandon Reed | 3,769 | 68.3 |
| Republican | Courtney Gilbert | 1,751 | 31.7 |
| Total votes | | 5,520 | 100.0 |

=== General election ===
==== Results ====
2022 Kentucky House of Representatives 24th district election
| Party | Candidate | Votes | % |
|---|---|---|---|
| Republican | Brandon Reed | 11,873 | 76.2 |
| Democratic | Keith Pruitt | 3,706 | 23.8 |
| Total votes | | 15,579 | 100.0 |
| Republican hold | | | |

== District 25 ==
Incumbent representative Jim DuPlessis did not seek reelection. He was succeeded by Republican Steve Bratcher.

=== Democratic primary ===
==== Candidates ====
===== Nominee =====
- Katherine Leonard

=== Republican primary ===
==== Candidates ====
===== Nominee =====
- Steve Bratcher

===== Eliminated in primary =====
- Bill Bennett

==== Results ====
Republican primary results
| Party | Candidate | Votes | % |
|---|---|---|---|
| Republican | Steve Bratcher | 1,593 | 67.6 |
| Republican | Bill Bennett | 765 | 32.4 |
| Total votes | | 2,358 | 100.0 |

=== General election ===
==== Results ====
2022 Kentucky House of Representatives 25th district election
| Party | Candidate | Votes | % |
|---|---|---|---|
| Republican | Steve Bratcher | 7,537 | 62.4 |
| Democratic | Katherine Leonard | 4,539 | 37.6 |
| Total votes | | 12,076 | 100.0 |
| Republican hold | | | |

== District 26 ==
Incumbent representative Russell Webber won reelection unopposed.

=== Republican primary ===
==== Candidates ====
===== Nominee =====
- Russell Webber, incumbent representative

=== General election ===
==== Results ====
2022 Kentucky House of Representatives 26th district election
| Party | Candidate | Votes | % |
|---|---|---|---|
| Republican | Russell Webber | Unopposed | |
| Total votes | | 8,790 | 100.0 |
| Republican hold | | | |

== District 27 ==
Incumbent representative Nancy Tate won reelection unopposed.

=== Republican primary ===
==== Candidates ====
===== Nominee =====
- Nancy Tate, incumbent representative

=== General election ===
==== Results ====
2022 Kentucky House of Representatives 27th district election
| Party | Candidate | Votes | % |
|---|---|---|---|
| Republican | Nancy Tate | Unopposed | |
| Total votes | | 9,365 | 100.0 |
| Republican hold | | | |

== District 28 ==
2022 Kentucky House of Representatives 28th district election
- November 8, 2022
| Nominee | Jared Bauman | Charles Miller |
| Party | Republican | Democratic |
| Popular vote | 8,209 | 6,334 |
| Percentage | 56.4% | 43.6% |
- Results by precinct: Bauman: 50-60% 60-70% Miller: 50-60% 70-80%
Representative before election
Charles Miller
Democratic
Elected Representative
Jared Bauman
Republican

Incumbent representative Charles Miller was defeated for reelection by Republican Jared Bauman.

=== Democratic primary ===
==== Candidates ====
===== Nominee =====
- Charles Miller, incumbent representative

===== Eliminated in primary =====
- Almaria Baker

==== Results ====
Results by precinct: Miller: 50–60%; 60–70%; 70–80%; 80–90%; Baker: 90–100%; Tie: 50%

Democratic primary results
| Party | Candidate | Votes | % |
|---|---|---|---|
| Democratic | Charles Miller | 2,221 | 65.6 |
| Democratic | Almaria Baker | 1,167 | 34.4 |
| Total votes | | 3,388 | 100.0 |

=== Republican primary ===
==== Candidates ====
===== Nominee =====
- Jared Bauman

=== General election ===
==== Results ====
2022 Kentucky House of Representatives 28th district election
| Party | Candidate | Votes | % |
|---|---|---|---|
| Republican | Jared Bauman | 8,209 | 56.4 |
| Democratic | Charles Miller | 6,334 | 43.6 |
| Total votes | | 14,543 | 100.0 |
| Republican gain from Democratic | | | |

== District 29 ==
Incumbent representative Kevin Bratcher won reelection, defeating write-in candidate Ann Sermersheim.

=== Republican primary ===
==== Candidates ====
===== Nominee =====
- Kevin Bratcher, incumbent representative

=== General election ===
==== Results ====
2022 Kentucky House of Representatives 29th district election
| Party | Candidate | Votes | % |
|---|---|---|---|
| Republican | Kevin Bratcher | 11,389 | 99.4 |
| Write-in | Ann Sermersheim | 66 | 0.6 |
| Total votes | | 11,455 | 100.0 |
| Republican hold | | | |

== District 30 ==
Incumbent Democratic representative Tom Burch was defeated for renomination by Daniel Grossberg.

=== Democratic primary ===
==== Candidates ====
===== Nominee =====
- Daniel Grossberg

===== Eliminated in primary =====
- Tom Burch, incumbent representative
- Neal Turpin

==== Results ====
Results by precinct: Grossberg: 40–50%; 50–60%; Burch: 40–50%; 50–60%; Tie: 40–50%

Democratic primary results
| Party | Candidate | Votes | % |
|---|---|---|---|
| Democratic | Daniel Grossberg | 1,840 | 44.9 |
| Democratic | Tom Burch | 1,719 | 42.0 |
| Democratic | Neal Turpin | 536 | 13.1 |
| Total votes | | 4,095 | 100.0 |

=== General election ===
==== Results ====
2022 Kentucky House of Representatives 30th district election
| Party | Candidate | Votes | % |
|---|---|---|---|
| Democratic | Daniel Grossberg | Unopposed | |
| Total votes | | 8,015 | 100.0 |
| Democratic hold | | | |

== District 31 ==
2022 Kentucky House of Representatives 31st district election
- November 8, 2022
| Nominee | Susan Tyler Witten | Sue Foster |
| Party | Republican | Democratic |
| Popular vote | 10,095 | 9,313 |
| Percentage | 52.0% | 48.0% |
- Results by precinct: Witten: 50-60% 60-70% Foster: 50-60% 60-70% Tie: 50%
Representative before election
Josie Raymond
Democratic
Elected Representative
Susan Tyler Witten
Republican

Incumbent representative Josie Raymond was redistricted to the 41st district and was succeeded by Republican Susan Tyler Witten.

=== Democratic primary ===
==== Candidates ====
===== Nominee =====
- Sue Foster

===== Eliminated in primary =====
- Derek Penwell

==== Results ====
Results by precinct: Foster: 50–60%; 60–70%; 70–80%; Penwell: 80–90%; Tie: 50%

Democratic primary results
| Party | Candidate | Votes | % |
|---|---|---|---|
| Democratic | Sue Foster | 2,767 | 63.5 |
| Democratic | Derek Penwell | 1,593 | 36.5 |
| Total votes | | 4,360 | 100.0 |

=== Republican primary ===
==== Candidates ====
===== Nominee =====
- Susan Tyler Witten

===== Eliminated in primary =====
- Flint Breckinridge

==== Results ====
Results by precinct: Witten: 50–60%; 60–70%; 70–80%; 80–90%

Republican primary results
| Party | Candidate | Votes | % |
|---|---|---|---|
| Republican | Susan Tyler Witten | 2,769 | 76.3 |
| Republican | Flint Breckinridge | 862 | 23.7 |
| Total votes | | 3,631 | 100.0 |

=== General election ===
==== Results ====
2022 Kentucky House of Representatives 31st district election
| Party | Candidate | Votes | % |
|---|---|---|---|
| Republican | Susan Tyler Witten | 10,095 | 52.0 |
| Democratic | Sue Foster | 9,313 | 48.0 |
| Write-in | Chris Adelmann | 2 | 0.0 |
| Total votes | | 19,410 | 100.0 |
| Republican gain from Democratic | | | |

== District 32 ==
Incumbent representative Tina Bojanowski won reelection unopposed.

=== Democratic primary ===
==== Candidates ====
===== Nominee =====
- Tina Bojanowski, incumbent representative

=== General election ===
==== Results ====
2022 Kentucky House of Representatives 32nd district election
| Party | Candidate | Votes | % |
|---|---|---|---|
| Democratic | Tina Bojanowski | Unopposed | |
| Total votes | | 13,061 | 100.0 |
| Democratic hold | | | |

== District 33 ==
Incumbent representative Jason Nemes won reelection, defeating Democratic candidate Kate Turner.

=== Democratic primary ===
==== Candidates ====
===== Nominee =====
- Kate Turner

=== Republican primary ===
==== Candidates ====
===== Nominee =====
- Jason Nemes, incumbent representative

=== General election ===
==== Results ====
2022 Kentucky House of Representatives 33rd district election
| Party | Candidate | Votes | % |
|---|---|---|---|
| Republican | Jason Nemes | 10,846 | 55.2 |
| Democratic | Kate Turner | 8,803 | 44.8 |
| Total votes | | 19,649 | 100.0 |
| Republican hold | | | |

== District 34 ==
Incumbent representative Mary Lou Marzian did not seek reelection. She was succeeded by Democrat Sarah Stalker.

=== Democratic primary ===
==== Candidates ====
===== Nominee =====
- Sarah Stalker

===== Eliminated in primary =====
- Jonathan Lowe

==== Results ====
Results by precinct: Stalker: 50–60%; 60–70%; 70–80%; 80–90%; Lowe: 50–60%; Tie: 50%

Democratic primary results
| Party | Candidate | Votes | % |
|---|---|---|---|
| Democratic | Sarah Stalker | 4,958 | 61.3 |
| Democratic | Jonathan Lowe | 3,132 | 38.7 |
| Total votes | | 8,090 | 100.0 |

=== General election ===
==== Results ====
2022 Kentucky House of Representatives 34th district election
| Party | Candidate | Votes | % |
|---|---|---|---|
| Democratic | Sarah Stalker | Unopposed | |
| Total votes | | 16,352 | 100.0 |
| Democratic hold | | | |

== District 35 ==
Incumbent representative Lisa Willner won reelection unopposed.

=== Democratic primary ===
==== Candidates ====
===== Nominee =====
- Lisa Willner, incumbent representative

=== General election ===
==== Results ====
2022 Kentucky House of Representatives 35th district election
| Party | Candidate | Votes | % |
|---|---|---|---|
| Democratic | Lisa Willner | Unopposed | |
| Total votes | | 6,381 | 100.0 |
| Democratic hold | | | |

== District 36 ==
Incumbent representative Jerry T. Miller did not seek reelection. He was succeeded by Republican John Hodgson.

=== Republican primary ===
==== Candidates ====
===== Nominee =====
- John Hodgson

===== Eliminated in primary =====
- Richard Crawford
- David Howser

==== Results ====
Results by precinct: Hodgson: 30–40%; 40–50%; 50–60%; 60–70%; 80–90%; Howser: 30–40%; 40–50%; 50–60%; 90–100%; Crawford: 30–40%

Republican primary results
| Party | Candidate | Votes | % |
|---|---|---|---|
| Republican | John Hodgson | 2,105 | 49.0 |
| Republican | David Howser | 1,466 | 34.1 |
| Republican | Richard Crawford | 722 | 16.8 |
| Total votes | | 4,293 | 100.0 |

=== General election ===
==== Results ====
2022 Kentucky House of Representatives 36th district election
| Party | Candidate | Votes | % |
|---|---|---|---|
| Republican | John Hodgson | Unopposed | |
| Total votes | | 14,667 | 100.0 |
| Republican hold | | | |

== District 37 ==
Incumbent representative Jeffery Donohue was defeated for reelection by Republican Emily Callaway.

=== Democratic primary ===
==== Candidates ====
===== Nominee =====
- Jeffery Donohue, incumbent representative

=== Republican primary ===
==== Candidates ====
===== Nominee =====
- Emily Callaway

===== Eliminated in primary =====
- Jimmy Maricle

==== Results ====
Republican primary results
| Party | Candidate | Votes | % |
|---|---|---|---|
| Republican | Emily Callaway | 1,302 | 62.8 |
| Republican | Jimmy Maricle | 770 | 27.2 |
| Total votes | | 2,072 | 100.0 |

=== General election ===
==== Results ====
2022 Kentucky House of Representatives 37th district election
| Party | Candidate | Votes | % |
|---|---|---|---|
| Republican | Emily Callaway | 7,494 | 57.9 |
| Democratic | Jeffery Donohue | 5,460 | 42.1 |
| Total votes | | 12,954 | 100.0 |
| Republican gain from Democratic | | | |

== District 38 ==
2022 Kentucky House of Representatives 38th district election
- November 8, 2022
| Nominee | Rachel Roarx | Charles Breitenbach |
| Party | Democratic | Republican |
| Popular vote | 6,522 | 6,146 |
| Percentage | 51.5% | 48.5% |
- Results by precinct: Roarx: 50-60% 60-70% 70-80% Breitenbach: 50-60% 60-70%
Representative before election
McKenzie Cantrell
Democratic
Elected Representative
Rachel Roarx
Democratic

Incumbent representative McKenzie Cantrell retired from the house to run for the Kentucky Court of Appeals. She was succeeded by Democrat Rachel Roarx.

=== Democratic primary ===
==== Candidates ====
===== Nominee =====
- Rachel Roarx

=== Republican primary ===
==== Candidates ====
===== Nominee =====
- Charles Breitenbach

=== General election ===
==== Results ====
2022 Kentucky House of Representatives 38th district election
| Party | Candidate | Votes | % |
|---|---|---|---|
| Democratic | Rachel Roarx | 6,522 | 51.5 |
| Republican | Charles Breitenbach | 6,146 | 48.5 |
| Total votes | | 12,668 | 100.0 |
| Democratic hold | | | |

== District 39 ==
Incumbent representative Matt Lockett won reelection, defeating Democratic candidate Gwendolyn Mitchell.

=== Democratic primary ===
==== Candidates ====
===== Nominee =====
- Gwendolyn Mitchell

=== Republican primary ===
==== Candidates ====
===== Nominee =====
- Matt Lockett, incumbent representative

=== General election ===
==== Results ====
2022 Kentucky House of Representatives 39th district election
| Party | Candidate | Votes | % |
|---|---|---|---|
| Republican | Matt Lockett | 8,329 | 59.6 |
| Democratic | Gwendolyn Mitchell | 5,640 | 40.4 |
| Total votes | | 13,969 | 100.0 |
| Republican hold | | | |

== District 40 ==
Incumbent representative Nima Kulkarni won reelection unopposed.

=== Democratic primary ===
==== Candidates ====
===== Nominee =====
- Nima Kulkarni, incumbent representative

=== General election ===
==== Results ====
2022 Kentucky House of Representatives 40th district election
| Party | Candidate | Votes | % |
|---|---|---|---|
| Democratic | Nima Kulkarni | Unopposed | |
| Total votes | | 7,318 | 100.0 |
| Democratic hold | | | |

== District 41 ==
2022 Kentucky House of Representatives 41st district election
- November 8, 2022
| Nominee | Josie Raymond | Carrie Sanders McKeehan |
| Party | Democratic | Republican |
| Popular vote | 16,014 | 5,782 |
| Percentage | 73.5% | 26.5% |
- Results by precinct: Raymond: 50-60% 60-70% 70-80% 80-90% 90-100%
Representative before election
Attica Scott
Democratic
Elected Representative
Josie Raymond
Democratic

Incumbent representative Attica Scott retired from the house to unsuccessfully run for congress. She was succeeded by representative Josie Raymond, who had been redistricted from the 31st district.

=== Democratic primary ===
==== Candidates ====
===== Nominee =====
- Josie Raymond, representative from the 31st district (2019–2023)

===== Eliminated in primary =====
- Darryl Young

==== Results ====
Results by precinct: Raymond: 50–60%; 60–70%; 70–80%; 80–90%; 90–100%; Young: 50–60%; 80–90%; Tie: 50%

Democratic primary results
| Party | Candidate | Votes | % |
|---|---|---|---|
| Democratic | Josie Raymond | 3,753 | 77.5 |
| Democratic | Darryl Young | 1,088 | 22.5 |
| Total votes | | 4,841 | 100.0 |

=== Republican primary ===
==== Candidates ====
===== Nominee =====
- Carrie Sanders McKeehan

===== Eliminated in primary =====
- Sara-Elizabeth Cottrell
- Bryan Shepherd

==== Results ====
Results by precinct: McKeehan: 30–40%; 40–50%; 50–60%; 60–70%; 70–80%; Cottrell: 30–40%; 40–50%; 50–60%; Shepherd: 50–60%; 80–90%; Tie: 40–50%

Republican primary results
| Party | Candidate | Votes | % |
|---|---|---|---|
| Republican | Carrie Sanders McKeehan | 848 | 44.4 |
| Republican | Sara-Elizabeth Cottrell | 630 | 33.0 |
| Republican | Bryan Shepherd | 430 | 22.5 |
| Total votes | | 1,908 | 100.0 |

=== General election ===
==== Results ====
2022 Kentucky House of Representatives 41st district election
| Party | Candidate | Votes | % |
|---|---|---|---|
| Democratic | Josie Raymond | 16,014 | 73.5 |
| Republican | Carrie Sanders McKeehan | 5,782 | 26.5 |
| Total votes | | 21,796 | 100.0 |
| Democratic hold | | | |

== District 42 ==
Incumbent representative Keturah Herron, who was first elected in a February special election, won reelection unopposed.

=== Democratic primary ===
==== Candidates ====
===== Nominee =====
- Keturah Herron, incumbent representative

=== General election ===
==== Results ====
2022 Kentucky House of Representatives 42nd district election
| Party | Candidate | Votes | % |
|---|---|---|---|
| Democratic | Keturah Herron | Unopposed | |
| Total votes | | 9,595 | 100.0 |
| Democratic hold | | | |

== District 43 ==
Incumbent representative Pamela Stevenson won reelection, defeating primary election challenger Robert LeVertis Bell.

=== Democratic primary ===
==== Candidates ====
===== Nominee =====
- Pamela Stevenson, incumbent representative

===== Eliminated in primary =====
- Robert LeVertis Bell

==== Results ====
Results by precinct: Stevenson: 50–60%; 60–70%; 70–80%; 80–90%; Bell: 50–60%; 60–70%; 70–80%; 80–90%

Democratic primary results
| Party | Candidate | Votes | % |
|---|---|---|---|
| Democratic | Pamela Stevenson | 2,622 | 53.8 |
| Democratic | Robert LeVertis Bell | 2,255 | 46.2 |
| Total votes | | 4,877 | 100.0 |

=== General election ===
==== Results ====
2022 Kentucky House of Representatives 43rd district election
| Party | Candidate | Votes | % |
|---|---|---|---|
| Democratic | Pamela Stevenson | Unopposed | |
| Total votes | | 9,045 | 100.0 |
| Democratic hold | | | |

== District 44 ==
Incumbent representative and house minority leader Joni Jenkins did not seek reelection. She was succeeded by Democrat Beverly Chester-Burton.

=== Democratic primary ===
==== Candidates ====
===== Nominee =====
- Beverly Chester-Burton

=== General election ===
==== Results ====
2022 Kentucky House of Representatives 44th district election
| Party | Candidate | Votes | % |
|---|---|---|---|
| Democratic | Beverly Chester-Burton | Unopposed | |
| Total votes | | 9,091 | 100.0 |
| Democratic hold | | | |

== District 45 ==
Incumbent representative Killian Timoney won reelection unopposed.

=== Republican primary ===
==== Candidates ====
===== Nominee =====
- Killian Timoney, incumbent representative

=== General election ===
==== Results ====
2022 Kentucky House of Representatives 45th district election
| Party | Candidate | Votes | % |
|---|---|---|---|
| Republican | Killian Timoney | Unopposed | |
| Total votes | | 13,061 | 100.0 |
| Republican hold | | | |

== District 46 ==
2022 Kentucky House of Representatives 46th district election
- November 8, 2022
| Nominee | Al Gentry | Ginny Mulvey-Woolridge |
| Party | Democratic | Republican |
| Popular vote | 8,842 | 7,247 |
| Percentage | 55.0% | 45.0% |
- Results by precinct: Gentry: 50-60% 60-70% 70-80% 90-100% Mulvey-Woolridge: 50-60% 60-70% Tie: 50%
Representative before election
Al Gentry
Democratic
Elected Representative
Al Gentry
Democratic

Incumbent representative Al Gentry won reelection, defeating Republican candidate Ginny Mulvey-Woolridge.

=== Democratic primary ===
==== Candidates ====
===== Nominee =====
- Al Gentry, incumbent representative

=== Republican primary ===
==== Candidates ====
===== Nominee =====
- Ginny Mulvey-Woolridge

=== General election ===
==== Results ====
2022 Kentucky House of Representatives 46th district election
| Party | Candidate | Votes | % |
|---|---|---|---|
| Democratic | Al Gentry | 8,842 | 55.0 |
| Republican | Ginny Mulvey-Woolridge | 7,247 | 45.0 |
| Total votes | | 16,089 | 100.0 |
| Democratic hold | | | |

== District 47 ==
Incumbent representative Felicia Rabourn won reelection, defeating Democratic candidate Kimberly Browning.

=== Democratic primary ===
==== Candidates ====
===== Nominee =====
- Kimberly Browning

=== Republican primary ===
==== Candidates ====
===== Nominee =====
- Felicia Rabourn, incumbent representative

=== General election ===
==== Results ====
2022 Kentucky House of Representatives 47th district election
| Party | Candidate | Votes | % |
|---|---|---|---|
| Republican | Felicia Rabourn | 11,387 | 71.8 |
| Democratic | Kimberly Browning | 4,479 | 28.2 |
| Total votes | | 15,866 | 100.0 |
| Republican hold | | | |

== District 48 ==
Incumbent representative Ken Fleming won reelection in a rematch with former representative Maria Sorolis, who he had defeated for reelection in 2020.

=== Democratic primary ===
==== Candidates ====
===== Nominee =====
- Maria Sorolis, representative from the 48th district (2019–2021)

=== Republican primary ===
==== Candidates ====
===== Nominee =====
- Ken Fleming, incumbent representative

=== General election ===
==== Results ====
2022 Kentucky House of Representatives 48th district election
| Party | Candidate | Votes | % |
|---|---|---|---|
| Republican | Ken Fleming | 12,334 | 54.2 |
| Democratic | Maria Sorolis | 10,443 | 45.8 |
| Total votes | | 22,777 | 100.0 |
| Republican hold | | | |

== District 49 ==
Incumbent representative Thomas Huff won reelection unopposed.

=== Republican primary ===
==== Candidates ====
===== Nominee =====
- Thomas Huff, incumbent representative

=== General election ===
==== Results ====
2022 Kentucky House of Representatives 49th district election
| Party | Candidate | Votes | % |
|---|---|---|---|
| Republican | Thomas Huff | Unopposed | |
| Total votes | | 10,594 | 100.0 |
| Republican hold | | | |

== District 50 ==
Incumbent representative Chad McCoy did not seek reelection. He was succeeded by Republican Candy Massaroni.

=== Republican primary ===
==== Candidates ====
===== Nominee =====
- Candy Massaroni

===== Eliminated in primary =====
- John Bradley

==== Results ====
Republican primary results
| Party | Candidate | Votes | % |
|---|---|---|---|
| Republican | Candy Massaroni | 1,523 | 51.3 |
| Republican | John Bradley | 1,444 | 48.7 |
| Total votes | | 2,967 | 100.0 |

=== General election ===
==== Results ====
2022 Kentucky House of Representatives 50th district election
| Party | Candidate | Votes | % |
|---|---|---|---|
| Republican | Candy Massaroni | Unopposed | |
| Total votes | | 12,770 | 100.0 |
| Republican hold | | | |

== District 51 ==
Incumbent representative Michael Pollock, who was first elected in a November 2021 special election, won reelection, defeating Democratic candidate Jennifer Wheeler.

=== Democratic primary ===
==== Candidates ====
===== Nominee =====
- Jennifer Wheeler

=== Republican primary ===
==== Candidates ====
===== Nominee =====
- Michael Pollock, incumbent representative

=== General election ===
==== Results ====
2022 Kentucky House of Representatives 51st district election
| Party | Candidate | Votes | % |
|---|---|---|---|
| Republican | Michael Pollock | 10,629 | 71.9 |
| Democratic | Jennifer Wheeler | 4,162 | 28.1 |
| Total votes | | 14,791 | 100.0 |
| Republican hold | | | |

== District 52 ==
Incumbent representative Ken Upchurch won reelection, defeating primary election challenger Othel King.

=== Republican primary ===
==== Candidates ====
===== Nominee =====
- Ken Upchurch, incumbent representative

===== Eliminated in primary =====
- Othel King

==== Results ====
Republican primary results
| Party | Candidate | Votes | % |
|---|---|---|---|
| Republican | Ken Upchurch | 5,438 | 62.6 |
| Republican | Othel King | 3,244 | 37.4 |
| Total votes | | 8,682 | 100.0 |

=== General election ===
==== Results ====
2022 Kentucky House of Representatives 52nd district election
| Party | Candidate | Votes | % |
|---|---|---|---|
| Republican | Ken Upchurch | Unopposed | |
| Total votes | | 11,931 | 100.0 |
| Republican hold | | | |

== District 53 ==
Incumbent representative James Tipton won reelection, defeating Democratic candidate Dustin Burley.

=== Democratic primary ===
==== Candidates ====
===== Nominee =====
- Dustin Burley

=== Republican primary ===
==== Candidates ====
===== Nominee =====
- James Tipton, incumbent representative

=== General election ===
==== Results ====
2022 Kentucky House of Representatives 53rd district election
| Party | Candidate | Votes | % |
|---|---|---|---|
| Republican | James Tipton | 12,995 | 76.7 |
| Democratic | Dustin Burley | 3,952 | 23.3 |
| Total votes | | 16,947 | 100.0 |
| Republican hold | | | |

== District 54 ==
Incumbent representative Daniel Elliott won reelection, defeating Democratic candidate Elaine Wilson-Reddy.

=== Democratic primary ===
==== Candidates ====
===== Nominee =====
- Elaine Wilson-Reddy

=== Republican primary ===
==== Candidates ====
===== Nominee =====
- Daniel Elliott, incumbent representative

=== General election ===
==== Results ====
2022 Kentucky House of Representatives 54th district election
| Party | Candidate | Votes | % |
|---|---|---|---|
| Republican | Daniel Elliott | 11,109 | 72.4 |
| Democratic | Elaine Wilson-Reddy | 4,237 | 27.6 |
| Total votes | | 15,346 | 100.0 |
| Republican hold | | | |

== District 55 ==
Incumbent representative Kim King won reelection, defeating primary election challenger Tony Wheatley.

=== Republican primary ===
==== Candidates ====
===== Nominee =====
- Kim King, incumbent representative

===== Eliminated in primary =====
- Tony Wheatley

==== Results ====
Republican primary results
| Party | Candidate | Votes | % |
|---|---|---|---|
| Republican | Kim King | 2,257 | 54.4 |
| Republican | Tony Wheatley | 1,895 | 45.6 |
| Total votes | | 4,152 | 100.0 |

=== General election ===
==== Results ====
2022 Kentucky House of Representatives 55th district election
| Party | Candidate | Votes | % |
|---|---|---|---|
| Republican | Kim King | Unopposed | |
| Total votes | | 12,485 | 100.0 |
| Republican hold | | | |

== District 56 ==
Incumbent representative Daniel Fister won reelection, defeating Democratic candidate Grayson Vandegrift.

=== Democratic primary ===
==== Candidates ====
===== Nominee =====
- Grayson Vandegrift

===== Eliminated in primary =====
- Ben Nolan

==== Results ====
Democratic primary results
| Party | Candidate | Votes | % |
|---|---|---|---|
| Democratic | Grayson Vandegrift | 3,005 | 65.2 |
| Democratic | Ben Nolan | 1,604 | 34.8 |
| Total votes | | 4,609 | 100.0 |

=== Republican primary ===
==== Candidates ====
===== Nominee =====
- Daniel Fister, incumbent representative

=== General election ===
==== Results ====
2022 Kentucky House of Representatives 56th district election
| Party | Candidate | Votes | % |
|---|---|---|---|
| Republican | Daniel Fister | 10,284 | 56.1 |
| Democratic | Grayson Vandegrift | 8,041 | 43.9 |
| Total votes | | 18,325 | 100.0 |
| Republican hold | | | |

== District 57 ==
Incumbent representative Derrick Graham won reelection, defeating Republican candidate Gary Stratton.

=== Democratic primary ===
==== Candidates ====
===== Nominee =====
- Derrick Graham, incumbent representative

=== Republican primary ===
==== Candidates ====
===== Nominee =====
- Gary Stratton

=== General election ===
==== Results ====
2022 Kentucky House of Representatives 57th district election
| Party | Candidate | Votes | % |
|---|---|---|---|
| Democratic | Derrick Graham | 10,066 | 62.4 |
| Republican | Gary Stratton | 6,073 | 37.6 |
| Total votes | | 16,139 | 100.0 |
| Democratic hold | | | |

== District 58 ==
Incumbent representative Jennifer Decker won reelection unopposed.

=== Republican primary ===
==== Candidates ====
===== Nominee =====
- Jennifer Decker, incumbent representative

=== General election ===
==== Results ====
2022 Kentucky House of Representatives 58th district election
| Party | Candidate | Votes | % |
|---|---|---|---|
| Republican | Jennifer Decker | Unopposed | |
| Total votes | | 12,484 | 100.0 |
| Republican hold | | | |

== District 59 ==
Incumbent representative and speaker of the house David Osborne won reelection, defeating primary election challenger Bridgette Ehly.

=== Republican primary ===
==== Candidates ====
===== Nominee =====
- David Osborne, incumbent representative

===== Eliminated in primary =====
- Bridgette Ehly

==== Results ====
Republican primary results
| Party | Candidate | Votes | % |
|---|---|---|---|
| Republican | David Osborne | 4,164 | 67.8 |
| Republican | Bridgette Ehly | 1,975 | 32.2 |
| Total votes | | 6,139 | 100.0 |

=== General election ===
==== Results ====
2022 Kentucky House of Representatives 59th district election
| Party | Candidate | Votes | % |
|---|---|---|---|
| Republican | David Osborne | Unopposed | |
| Total votes | | 12,655 | 100.0 |
| Republican hold | | | |

== District 60 ==
Incumbent Republican representative Sal Santoro was defeated for renomination by Marianne Proctor.

=== Republican primary ===
==== Candidates ====
===== Nominee =====
- Marianne Proctor

===== Eliminated in primary =====
- Sal Santoro, incumbent representative

==== Results ====
Republican primary results
| Party | Candidate | Votes | % |
|---|---|---|---|
| Republican | Marianne Proctor | 1,958 | 51.7 |
| Republican | Sal Santoro | 1,827 | 48.3 |
| Total votes | | 3,785 | 100.0 |

=== General election ===
==== Results ====
2022 Kentucky House of Representatives 60th district election
| Party | Candidate | Votes | % |
|---|---|---|---|
| Republican | Marianne Proctor | Unopposed | |
| Total votes | | 12,490 | 100.0 |
| Republican hold | | | |

== District 61 ==
Incumbent representative Savannah Maddox won reelection, defeating primary and general election challengers.

=== Democratic primary ===
==== Candidates ====
===== Nominee =====
- Debby Angel

=== Republican primary ===
==== Candidates ====
===== Nominee =====
- Savannah Maddox, incumbent representative

===== Eliminated in primary =====
- Jarrod Lykins

==== Results ====
Republican primary results
| Party | Candidate | Votes | % |
|---|---|---|---|
| Republican | Savannah Maddox | 2,949 | 71.2 |
| Republican | Jarrod Lykins | 1,192 | 28.8 |
| Total votes | | 4,141 | 100.0 |

=== General election ===
==== Results ====
2022 Kentucky House of Representatives 61st district election
| Party | Candidate | Votes | % |
|---|---|---|---|
| Republican | Savannah Maddox | 11,351 | 76.5 |
| Democratic | Debby Angel | 3,493 | 23.5 |
| Total votes | | 14,844 | 100.0 |
| Republican hold | | | |

== District 62 ==
Incumbent representative Phillip Pratt won reelection, defeating primary election challenger Michelle Nance.

=== Republican primary ===
==== Candidates ====
===== Nominee =====
- Phillip Pratt, incumbent representative

===== Eliminated in primary =====
- Michelle Nance

==== Results ====
Republican primary results
| Party | Candidate | Votes | % |
|---|---|---|---|
| Republican | Phillip Pratt | 3,264 | 79.8 |
| Republican | Michelle Nance | 827 | 20.2 |
| Total votes | | 4,091 | 100.0 |

=== General election ===
==== Results ====
2022 Kentucky House of Representatives 62nd district election
| Party | Candidate | Votes | % |
|---|---|---|---|
| Republican | Phillip Pratt | Unopposed | |
| Total votes | | 11,054 | 100.0 |
| Republican hold | | | |

== District 63 ==
Incumbent representative Kim Banta won reelection unopposed.

=== Republican primary ===
==== Candidates ====
===== Nominee =====
- Kim Banta, incumbent representative

=== General election ===
==== Results ====
2022 Kentucky House of Representatives 63rd district election
| Party | Candidate | Votes | % |
|---|---|---|---|
| Republican | Kim Banta | Unopposed | |
| Total votes | | 9,359 | 100.0 |
| Republican hold | | | |

== District 64 ==
Incumbent representative Kimberly Poore Moser won reelection, defeating primary and general election challengers.

=== Democratic primary ===
==== Candidates ====
===== Nominee =====
- Anita Isaacs

=== Republican primary ===
==== Candidates ====
===== Nominee =====
- Kimberly Poore Moser, incumbent representative

===== Eliminated in primary =====
- Christopher Mann

==== Results ====
Republican primary results
| Party | Candidate | Votes | % |
|---|---|---|---|
| Republican | Kimberly Poore Moser | 2,007 | 73.7 |
| Republican | Christopher Mann | 718 | 26.3 |
| Total votes | | 2,725 | 100.0 |

=== General election ===
==== Results ====
2022 Kentucky House of Representatives 64th district election
| Party | Candidate | Votes | % |
|---|---|---|---|
| Republican | Kimberly Poore Moser | 9,104 | 65.6 |
| Democratic | Anita Isaacs | 4,769 | 34.4 |
| Total votes | | 13,873 | 100.0 |
| Republican hold | | | |

== District 65 ==
Incumbent representative Buddy Wheatley was defeated for reelection by Republican Stephanie Dietz.

=== Democratic primary ===
==== Candidates ====
===== Nominee =====
- Buddy Wheatley, incumbent representative

=== Republican primary ===
==== Candidates ====
===== Nominee =====
- Stephanie Dietz

=== General election ===
==== Results ====
2022 Kentucky House of Representatives 65th district election
| Party | Candidate | Votes | % |
|---|---|---|---|
| Republican | Stephanie Dietz | 6,912 | 51.0 |
| Democratic | Buddy Wheatley | 6,629 | 49.0 |
| Total votes | | 13,541 | 100.0 |
| Republican gain from Democratic | | | |

== District 66 ==
Incumbent Republican representative C. Ed Massey was defeated for renomination by Steve Rawlings.

=== Democratic primary ===
==== Candidates ====
===== Nominee =====
- Tim Montgomery

=== Republican primary ===
==== Candidates ====
===== Nominee =====
- Steve Rawlings

===== Eliminated in primary =====
- C. Ed Massey, incumbent representative

==== Results ====
Republican primary results
| Party | Candidate | Votes | % |
|---|---|---|---|
| Republican | Steve Rawlings | 2,695 | 68.7 |
| Republican | C. Ed Massey | 1,227 | 31.3 |
| Total votes | | 3,922 | 100.0 |

=== General election ===
==== Results ====
2022 Kentucky House of Representatives 66th district election
| Party | Candidate | Votes | % |
|---|---|---|---|
| Republican | Steve Rawlings | 11,235 | 70.4 |
| Democratic | Tim Montgomery | 4,719 | 29.6 |
| Total votes | | 15,954 | 100.0 |
| Republican hold | | | |

== District 67 ==
Incumbent representative Rachel Roberts won reelection, defeating Republican candidate Jerry Gearding.

=== Democratic primary ===
==== Candidates ====
===== Nominee =====
- Rachel Roberts, incumbent representative

=== Republican primary ===
==== Candidates ====
===== Nominee =====
- Jerry Gearding

=== General election ===
==== Results ====
2022 Kentucky House of Representatives 67th district election
| Party | Candidate | Votes | % |
|---|---|---|---|
| Democratic | Rachel Roberts | 7,673 | 56.1 |
| Republican | Jerry Gearding | 5,996 | 43.9 |
| Total votes | | 13,669 | 100.0 |
| Democratic hold | | | |

== District 68 ==
Incumbent representative Joseph Fischer retired from the house to run for the Kentucky Supreme Court. He was succeeded by Republican Mike Clines.

=== Democratic primary ===
==== Candidates ====
===== Nominee =====
- Kelly Jones

=== Republican primary ===
==== Candidates ====
===== Nominee =====
- Mike Clines

===== Eliminated in primary =====
- Mirna Eads
- Paul Kloeker

==== Results ====
Republican primary results
| Party | Candidate | Votes | % |
|---|---|---|---|
| Republican | Mike Clines | 2,827 | 53.8 |
| Republican | Paul Kloeker | 1,640 | 31.2 |
| Republican | Mirna Eads | 791 | 15.0 |
| Total votes | | 5,258 | 100.0 |

=== General election ===
==== Results ====
2022 Kentucky House of Representatives 68th district election
| Party | Candidate | Votes | % |
|---|---|---|---|
| Republican | Mike Clines | 11,964 | 63.4 |
| Democratic | Kelly Jones | 6,909 | 36.6 |
| Total votes | | 18,873 | 100.0 |
| Republican hold | | | |

== District 69 ==
Incumbent Republican representative Adam Koenig was defeated for renomination by Steven Doan.

=== Democratic primary ===
==== Candidates ====
===== Nominee =====
- Chris Brown

=== Republican primary ===
==== Candidates ====
===== Nominee =====
- Steven Doan

===== Eliminated in primary =====
- Adam Koenig, incumbent representative

==== Results ====
Republican primary results
| Party | Candidate | Votes | % |
|---|---|---|---|
| Republican | Steven Doan | 1,369 | 53.7 |
| Republican | Adam Koenig | 1,179 | 46.3 |
| Total votes | | 2,548 | 100.0 |

=== General election ===
==== Results ====
2022 Kentucky House of Representatives 69th district election
| Party | Candidate | Votes | % |
|---|---|---|---|
| Republican | Steven Doan | 6,320 | 60.0 |
| Democratic | Chris Brown | 4,218 | 40.0 |
| Total votes | | 10,538 | 100.0 |
| Republican hold | | | |

== District 70 ==
Incumbent representative William Lawrence won reelection, defeating Democratic candidate Meagan Brannon.

=== Democratic primary ===
==== Candidates ====
===== Nominee =====
- Meagan Brannon

=== Republican primary ===
==== Candidates ====
===== Nominee =====
- William Lawrence, incumbent representative

=== General election ===
==== Results ====
2022 Kentucky House of Representatives 70th district election
| Party | Candidate | Votes | % |
|---|---|---|---|
| Republican | William Lawrence | 10,890 | 65.4 |
| Democratic | Meagan Brannon | 5,758 | 34.6 |
| Total votes | | 16,648 | 100.0 |
| Republican hold | | | |

== District 71 ==
Incumbent representative Josh Bray won reelection unopposed.

=== Republican primary ===
==== Candidates ====
===== Nominee =====
- Josh Bray, incumbent representative

=== General election ===
==== Results ====
2022 Kentucky House of Representatives 71st district election
| Party | Candidate | Votes | % |
|---|---|---|---|
| Republican | Josh Bray | Unopposed | |
| Total votes | | 10,124 | 100.0 |
| Republican hold | | | |

== District 72 ==
Incumbent representative Matthew Koch won reelection unopposed.

=== Republican primary ===
==== Candidates ====
===== Nominee =====
- Matthew Koch, incumbent representative

=== General election ===
==== Results ====
2022 Kentucky House of Representatives 72nd district election
| Party | Candidate | Votes | % |
|---|---|---|---|
| Republican | Matthew Koch | Unopposed | |
| Total votes | | 10,984 | 100.0 |
| Republican hold | | | |

== District 73 ==
Incumbent representative Ryan Dotson won reelection, defeating Democratic candidate Thomas Adams.

=== Democratic primary ===
==== Candidates ====
===== Nominee =====
- Thomas Adams

===== Eliminated in primary =====
- Rory Houlihan

==== Results ====
Democratic primary results
| Party | Candidate | Votes | % |
|---|---|---|---|
| Democratic | Thomas Adams | 1,416 | 53.2 |
| Democratic | Rory Houlihan | 1,244 | 46.8 |
| Total votes | | 2,660 | 100.0 |

=== Republican primary ===
==== Candidates ====
===== Nominee =====
- Ryan Dotson, incumbent representative

=== General election ===
==== Results ====
2022 Kentucky House of Representatives 73rd district election
| Party | Candidate | Votes | % |
|---|---|---|---|
| Republican | Ryan Dotson | 8,704 | 56.6 |
| Democratic | Thomas Adams | 6,678 | 43.4 |
| Total votes | | 15,382 | 100.0 |
| Republican hold | | | |

== District 74 ==
Incumbent representative David Hale won reelection, defeating Democratic candidate Bennie Deskins.

=== Democratic primary ===
==== Candidates ====
===== Nominee =====
- Bennie Deskins

=== Republican primary ===
==== Candidates ====
===== Nominee =====
- David Hale, incumbent representative

=== General election ===
==== Results ====
2022 Kentucky House of Representatives 74th district election
| Party | Candidate | Votes | % |
|---|---|---|---|
| Republican | David Hale | 10,764 | 70.4 |
| Democratic | Bennie Deskins | 4,522 | 29.6 |
| Total votes | | 15,286 | 100.0 |
| Republican hold | | | |

== District 75 ==
Incumbent representative Kelly Flood did not seek reelection. She was succeeded by Democrat Lindsey Burke.

=== Democratic primary ===
==== Candidates ====
===== Nominee =====
- Lindsey Burke

===== Eliminated in primary =====
- Chris Couch

==== Results ====
Democratic primary results
| Party | Candidate | Votes | % |
|---|---|---|---|
| Democratic | Lindsey Burke | 2,822 | 84.5 |
| Democratic | Chris Couch | 517 | 15.5 |
| Total votes | | 3,339 | 100.0 |

=== General election ===
==== Results ====
2022 Kentucky House of Representatives 75th district election
| Party | Candidate | Votes | % |
|---|---|---|---|
| Democratic | Lindsey Burke | Unopposed | |
| Total votes | | 8,440 | 100.0 |
| Democratic hold | | | |

== District 76 ==
Incumbent representative Ruth Ann Palumbo won reelection unopposed.

=== Democratic primary ===
==== Candidates ====
===== Nominee =====
- Ruth Ann Palumbo, incumbent representative

=== General election ===
==== Results ====
2022 Kentucky House of Representatives 76th district election
| Party | Candidate | Votes | % |
|---|---|---|---|
| Democratic | Ruth Ann Palumbo | Unopposed | |
| Total votes | | 10,950 | 100.0 |
| Democratic hold | | | |

== District 77 ==
Incumbent representative George Brown Jr. won reelection, defeating Republican candidate Terry Cunningham.

=== Democratic primary ===
==== Candidates ====
===== Nominee =====
- George Brown Jr., incumbent representative

=== Republican primary ===
==== Candidates ====
===== Nominee =====
- Terry Cunningham

=== General election ===
==== Results ====
2022 Kentucky House of Representatives 77th district election
| Party | Candidate | Votes | % |
|---|---|---|---|
| Democratic | George Brown Jr. | 9,011 | 75.7 |
| Republican | Terry Cunningham | 2,892 | 24.3 |
| Total votes | | 11,903 | 100.0 |
| Democratic hold | | | |

== District 78 ==
Incumbent representative Mark Hart won reelection unopposed.

=== Republican primary ===
==== Candidates ====
===== Nominee =====
- Mark Hart, incumbent representative

=== General election ===
==== Results ====
2022 Kentucky House of Representatives 78th district election
| Party | Candidate | Votes | % |
|---|---|---|---|
| Republican | Mark Hart | Unopposed | |
| Total votes | | 12,262 | 100.0 |
| Republican hold | | | |

== District 79 ==
Incumbent representative Susan Westrom did not seek reelection. She was succeeded by Democrat Chad Aull.

=== Democratic primary ===
==== Candidates ====
===== Nominee =====
- Chad Aull

===== Eliminated in primary =====
- Justin Bramhall

==== Results ====
Democratic primary results
| Party | Candidate | Votes | % |
|---|---|---|---|
| Democratic | Chad Aull | 2,790 | 86.9 |
| Democratic | Justin Bramhall | 422 | 13.1 |
| Total votes | | 3,212 | 100.0 |

=== General election ===
==== Results ====
2022 Kentucky House of Representatives 79th district election
| Party | Candidate | Votes | % |
|---|---|---|---|
| Democratic | Chad Aull | Unopposed | |
| Total votes | | 9,215 | 100.0 |
| Democratic hold | | | |

== District 80 ==
Incumbent representative David Meade won reelection unopposed.

=== Republican primary ===
==== Candidates ====
===== Nominee =====
- David Meade, incumbent representative

=== General election ===
==== Results ====
2022 Kentucky House of Representatives 80th district election
| Party | Candidate | Votes | % |
|---|---|---|---|
| Republican | David Meade | Unopposed | |
| Total votes | | 11,696 | 100.0 |
| Republican hold | | | |

== District 81 ==
Incumbent representative Deanna Frazier won reelection unopposed.

=== Republican primary ===
==== Candidates ====
===== Nominee =====
- Deanna Frazier, incumbent representative

=== General election ===
==== Results ====
2022 Kentucky House of Representatives 81st district election
| Party | Candidate | Votes | % |
|---|---|---|---|
| Republican | Deanna Frazier | Unopposed | |
| Total votes | | 12,088 | 100.0 |
| Republican hold | | | |

== District 82 ==
Incumbent representative Regina Bunch did not seek reelection. She was succeeded by Republican Nick Wilson.

=== Republican primary ===
==== Candidates ====
===== Nominee =====
- Nick Wilson

=== General election ===
==== Results ====
2022 Kentucky House of Representatives 82nd district election
| Party | Candidate | Votes | % |
|---|---|---|---|
| Republican | Nick Wilson | Unopposed | |
| Total votes | | 10,257 | 100.0 |
| Republican hold | | | |

== District 83 ==
Incumbent representative Josh Branscum won reelection unopposed.

=== Republican primary ===
==== Candidates ====
===== Nominee =====
- Josh Branscum, incumbent representative

=== General election ===
==== Results ====
2022 Kentucky House of Representatives 83rd district election
| Party | Candidate | Votes | % |
|---|---|---|---|
| Republican | Josh Branscum | Unopposed | |
| Total votes | | 13,055 | 100.0 |
| Republican hold | | | |

== District 84 ==
Incumbent representative Chris Fugate won reelection, defeating Democratic candidate Theresa Combs.

=== Democratic primary ===
==== Candidates ====
===== Nominee =====
- Theresa Combs

=== Republican primary ===
==== Candidates ====
===== Nominee =====
- Chris Fugate, incumbent representative

=== General election ===
==== Results ====
2022 Kentucky House of Representatives 84th district election
| Party | Candidate | Votes | % |
|---|---|---|---|
| Republican | Chris Fugate | 8,676 | 68.9 |
| Democratic | Theresa Combs | 3,918 | 31.1 |
| Total votes | | 12,594 | 100.0 |
| Republican hold | | | |

== District 85 ==
Incumbent representative Shane Baker won reelection, defeating Democratic candidate Bryon Vaught.

=== Democratic primary ===
==== Candidates ====
===== Nominee =====
- Bryon Vaught

=== Republican primary ===
==== Candidates ====
===== Nominee =====
- Shane Baker, incumbent representative

=== General election ===
==== Results ====
2022 Kentucky House of Representatives 85th district election
| Party | Candidate | Votes | % |
|---|---|---|---|
| Republican | Shane Baker | 11,756 | 81.9 |
| Democratic | Bryon Vaught | 2,606 | 18.1 |
| Total votes | | 14,362 | 100.0 |
| Republican hold | | | |

== District 86 ==
Incumbent representative Tom Smith won reelection, defeating primary election challenger Keith Dinsmore.

=== Republican primary ===
==== Candidates ====
===== Nominee =====
- Tom Smith, incumbent representative

===== Eliminated in primary =====
- Keith Dinsmore

==== Results ====
Republican primary results
| Party | Candidate | Votes | % |
|---|---|---|---|
| Republican | Tom Smith | 4,367 | 76.5 |
| Republican | Keith Dinsmore | 1,344 | 23.5 |
| Total votes | | 5,711 | 100.0 |

=== General election ===
==== Results ====
2022 Kentucky House of Representatives 86th district election
| Party | Candidate | Votes | % |
|---|---|---|---|
| Republican | Tom Smith | Unopposed | |
| Total votes | | 9,142 | 100.0 |
| Republican hold | | | |

== District 87 ==
Incumbent representative Adam Bowling won reelection, defeating Democratic candidate Gary Smith.

=== Democratic primary ===
==== Candidates ====
===== Nominee =====
- Gary Smith

=== Republican primary ===
==== Candidates ====
===== Nominee =====
- Adam Bowling, incumbent representative

=== General election ===
==== Results ====
2022 Kentucky House of Representatives 87th district election
| Party | Candidate | Votes | % |
|---|---|---|---|
| Republican | Adam Bowling | 10,057 | 83.7 |
| Democratic | Gary Smith | 1,953 | 16.3 |
| Total votes | | 12,010 | 100.0 |
| Republican hold | | | |

== District 88 ==
Incumbent representative Cherlynn Stevenson won reelection, defeating Republican candidate Jim Coleman.

=== Democratic primary ===
==== Candidates ====
===== Nominee =====
- Cherlynn Stevenson, incumbent representative

=== Republican primary ===
==== Candidates ====
===== Nominee =====
- Jim Coleman

=== General election ===
==== Results ====
2022 Kentucky House of Representatives 88th district election
| Party | Candidate | Votes | % |
|---|---|---|---|
| Democratic | Cherlynn Stevenson | 8,216 | 50.11 |
| Republican | Jim Coleman | 8,179 | 49.89 |
| Total votes | | 16,395 | 100.00 |
| Democratic hold | | | |

== District 89 ==
Incumbent representative Timmy Truett, who was first elected in a November 2021 special election, won reelection, defeating Democratic candidate Brittany Oliver.

=== Democratic primary ===
==== Candidates ====
===== Nominee =====
- Brittany Oliver

=== Republican primary ===
==== Candidates ====
===== Nominee =====
- Timmy Truett, incumbent representative

=== General election ===
==== Results ====
2022 Kentucky House of Representatives 89th district election
| Party | Candidate | Votes | % |
|---|---|---|---|
| Republican | Timmy Truett | 10,756 | 77.1 |
| Democratic | Brittany Oliver | 3,194 | 22.9 |
| Total votes | | 13,950 | 100.0 |
| Republican hold | | | |

== District 90 ==
Incumbent representative Derek Lewis won reelection unopposed.

=== Republican primary ===
==== Candidates ====
===== Nominee =====
- Derek Lewis, incumbent representative

=== General election ===
==== Results ====
2022 Kentucky House of Representatives 90th district election
| Party | Candidate | Votes | % |
|---|---|---|---|
| Republican | Derek Lewis | Unopposed | |
| Total votes | | 11,092 | 100.0 |
| Republican hold | | | |

== District 91 ==
Incumbent representative Bill Wesley won reelection, defeating primary and general election challengers.

=== Democratic primary ===
==== Candidates ====
===== Nominee =====
- Martina Jackson

=== Republican primary ===
==== Candidates ====
===== Nominee =====
- Bill Wesley, incumbent representative

===== Eliminated in primary =====
- Darrell Billings

==== Results ====
Republican primary results
| Party | Candidate | Votes | % |
|---|---|---|---|
| Republican | Bill Wesley | 2,510 | 63.2 |
| Republican | Darrell Billings | 1,459 | 36.8 |
| Total votes | | 3,969 | 100.0 |

=== General election ===
==== Results ====
2022 Kentucky House of Representatives 91st district election
| Party | Candidate | Votes | % |
|---|---|---|---|
| Republican | Bill Wesley | 9,050 | 68.2 |
| Democratic | Martina Jackson | 4,214 | 31.8 |
| Total votes | | 13,264 | 100.0 |
| Republican hold | | | |

== District 92 ==
Incumbent representative John Blanton won reelection unopposed.

=== Republican primary ===
==== Candidates ====
===== Nominee =====
- John Blanton, incumbent representative

=== General election ===
==== Results ====
2022 Kentucky House of Representatives 92nd district election
| Party | Candidate | Votes | % |
|---|---|---|---|
| Republican | John Blanton | Unopposed | |
| Total votes | | 11,179 | 100.0 |
| Republican hold | | | |

== District 93 ==
Redistricting moved the 93rd district from eastern Kentucky (Martin and Pike Counties) to Lexington. Incumbent representative Norma Kirk-McCormick was redistricted to the 97th district and was succeeded by Democrat Lamin Swann.

=== Democratic primary ===
==== Candidates ====
===== Nominee =====
- Lamin Swann

=== Republican primary ===
==== Candidates ====
===== Nominee =====
- Kyle Whalen

=== General election ===
==== Results ====
2022 Kentucky House of Representatives 93rd district election
| Party | Candidate | Votes | % |
|---|---|---|---|
| Democratic | Lamin Swann | 7,699 | 53.8 |
| Republican | Kyle Whalen | 6,601 | 46.2 |
| Total votes | | 14,300 | 100.0 |
| Democratic gain from Republican | | | |

== District 94 ==
Incumbent representative Angie Hatton was defeated for reelection by Republican Jacob Justice.

=== Democratic primary ===
==== Candidates ====
===== Nominee =====
- Angie Hatton, incumbent representative

=== Republican primary ===
==== Candidates ====
===== Nominee =====
- Jacob Justice

===== Eliminated in primary =====
- Brandon Edwards

==== Results ====
Republican primary results
| Party | Candidate | Votes | % |
|---|---|---|---|
| Republican | Jacob Justice | 1,677 | 51.5 |
| Republican | Brandon Edwards | 1,578 | 48.5 |
| Total votes | | 3,255 | 100.0 |

=== General election ===
==== Results ====
2022 Kentucky House of Representatives 94th district election
| Party | Candidate | Votes | % |
|---|---|---|---|
| Republican | Jacob Justice | 7,331 | 56.7 |
| Democratic | Angie Hatton | 5,595 | 43.3 |
| Total votes | | 12,926 | 100.0 |
| Republican gain from Democratic | | | |

== District 95 ==
Incumbent representative Ashley Tackett Laferty won reelection, defeating Republican candidate Brandon Spencer.

=== Democratic primary ===
==== Candidates ====
===== Nominee =====
- Ashley Tackett Laferty, incumbent representative

=== Republican primary ===
==== Candidates ====
===== Nominee =====
- Brandon Spencer, representative from the 95th district (2007)

===== Eliminated in primary =====
- David Pennington

==== Results ====
Republican primary results
| Party | Candidate | Votes | % |
|---|---|---|---|
| Republican | Brandon Spencer | 1,110 | 58.3 |
| Republican | David Pennington | 793 | 41.7 |
| Total votes | | 1,903 | 100.0 |

=== General election ===
==== Results ====
2022 Kentucky House of Representatives 95th district election
| Party | Candidate | Votes | % |
|---|---|---|---|
| Democratic | Ashley Tackett Laferty | 8,775 | 59.8 |
| Republican | Brandon Spencer | 5,890 | 40.2 |
| Total votes | | 14,665 | 100.0 |
| Democratic hold | | | |

== District 96 ==
Incumbent representative Patrick Flannery won reelection unopposed.

=== Republican primary ===
==== Candidates ====
===== Nominee =====
- Patrick Flannery, incumbent representative

=== General election ===
==== Results ====
2022 Kentucky House of Representatives 96th district election
| Party | Candidate | Votes | % |
|---|---|---|---|
| Republican | Patrick Flannery | Unopposed | |
| Total votes | | 11,282 | 100.0 |
| Republican hold | | | |

== District 97 ==
Incumbent representative Bobby McCool was challenged for the Republican nomination by representative Norma Kirk-McCormick, who had been redistricted from the 93rd district.

=== Republican primary ===
==== Candidates ====
===== Nominee =====
- Bobby McCool, incumbent representative

===== Eliminated in primary =====
- Norma Kirk-McCormick, representative from the 93rd district (2021–2023)

==== Results ====
Republican primary results
| Party | Candidate | Votes | % |
|---|---|---|---|
| Republican | Bobby McCool | 4,244 | 60.4 |
| Republican | Norma Kirk-McCormick | 2,778 | 39.6 |
| Total votes | | 7,022 | 100.0 |

=== General election ===
==== Results ====
2022 Kentucky House of Representatives 97th district election
| Party | Candidate | Votes | % |
|---|---|---|---|
| Republican | Bobby McCool | Unopposed | |
| Total votes | | 9,395 | 100.0 |
| Republican hold | | | |

== District 98 ==
Incumbent representative Danny Bentley won reelection, defeating primary election challenger James Campbell.

=== Republican primary ===
==== Candidates ====
===== Nominee =====
- Danny Bentley, incumbent representative

===== Eliminated in primary =====
- James Campbell

==== Results ====
Republican primary results
| Party | Candidate | Votes | % |
|---|---|---|---|
| Republican | Danny Bentley | 3,495 | 73.0 |
| Republican | James Campbell | 1,294 | 27.0 |
| Total votes | | 4,789 | 100.0 |

=== General election ===
==== Results ====
2022 Kentucky House of Representatives 98th district election
| Party | Candidate | Votes | % |
|---|---|---|---|
| Republican | Danny Bentley | Unopposed | |
| Total votes | | 12,216 | 100.0 |
| Republican hold | | | |

== District 99 ==
Incumbent representative Richard White won reelection, defeating Democratic candidate Kevin Anderson.

=== Democratic primary ===
==== Candidates ====
===== Nominee =====
- Kevin Anderson

===== Eliminated in primary =====
- Edward Frazier

==== Results ====
Democratic primary results
| Party | Candidate | Votes | % |
|---|---|---|---|
| Democratic | Kevin Anderson | 3,284 | 65.6 |
| Democratic | Edward Frazier | 1,725 | 34.4 |
| Total votes | | 5,009 | 100.0 |

=== Republican primary ===
==== Candidates ====
===== Nominee =====
- Richard White, incumbent representative

=== General election ===
==== Results ====
2022 Kentucky House of Representatives 99th district election
| Party | Candidate | Votes | % |
|---|---|---|---|
| Republican | Richard White | 8,188 | 60.4 |
| Democratic | Kevin Anderson | 5,379 | 39.6 |
| Total votes | | 13,567 | 100.0 |
| Republican hold | | | |

== District 100 ==
Incumbent representative Scott Sharp won reelection, defeating write-in candidate Deborah Criss.

=== Republican primary ===
==== Candidates ====
===== Nominee =====
- Scott Sharp, incumbent representative

=== General election ===
==== Results ====
2022 Kentucky House of Representatives 100th district election
| Party | Candidate | Votes | % |
|---|---|---|---|
| Republican | Scott Sharp | 9,845 | 99.9 |
| Write-in | Deborah Criss | 5 | 0.1 |
| Total votes | | 9,850 | 100.0 |
| Republican hold | | | |

== See also ==
- 2022 Kentucky elections
  - 2022 Kentucky Senate election
  - 2022 United States Senate election in Kentucky
  - 2022 United States House of Representatives elections in Kentucky
