= Sal Santoro =

American politician (born 1951)

Member of the Kentucky House of Representatives from the 60th district
- In office January 1, 2007 – January 1, 2023
- Preceded by: Paul Marcotte
- Succeeded by: Marianne Proctor

Personal details
- Born: July 14, 1951 (age 75)
- Party: Republican
- Education: University of Cincinnati; Xavier University

Sal Santoro (born July 14, 1951) is an American politician and a Republican member of the Kentucky House of Representatives representing District 60 from 2007 to 2023. Santoro was a Kentucky State Policeman. He was defeated for renomination in 2022 by Marianne Proctor.

== Education ==
Santoro earned his BA from the University of Cincinnati and his MA from Xavier University.

== Elections ==
- 2012 Santoro was unopposed for both the May 22, 2012 Republican Primary, and the November 6, 2012 General election, winning with 21,798 votes.
- 2006 When District 60 Representative Paul Marcotte left the Legislature and left the seat open, Santoro won the 2006 Republican Primary with 1,487 votes (55.2%) and won the November 7, 2006 General election with 9,783 votes (68.4%) against Democratic nominee David Ryan.
- 2008 Santoro was unopposed for both the 2008 Republican Primary and the November 4, 2008 General election, winning with 20,471 votes.
- 2010 Santoro was unopposed for the May 18, 2010 Republican Primary and won the November 2, 2010 General election with 12,595 votes (80.4%) against Independent candidate Sean McPhillips.
