= Mike Clines =

American politician

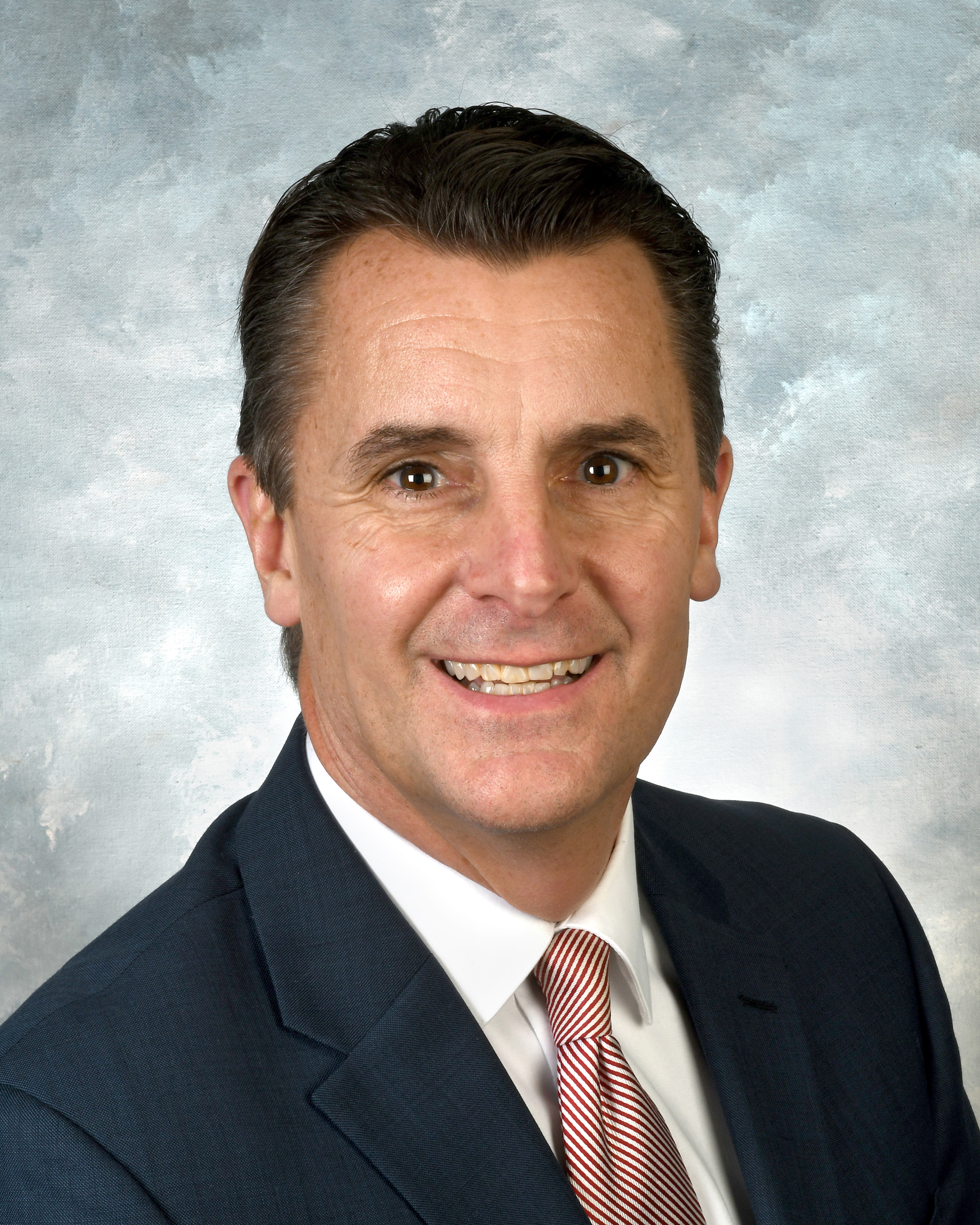

Member of the Kentucky House of Representatives from the 68th district
- Incumbent
- Assumed office January 1, 2023
- Preceded by: Joseph Fischer

Personal details
- Party: Republican
- Spouse: Tammy Clines
- Children: 3
- Education: Northern Kentucky University (BA); University of Cincinnati (M.Ed)
- Profession: Educator, consultant
- Committees: Primary & Secondary Education (vice chair); Banking and Insurance; Families & Children; Licensing, Occupations, & Administrative Regulations

Michael T. Clines (born August 4, 1968) is an American politician and Republican member of the Kentucky House of Representatives from Kentucky's 68th House district. His district includes parts of Campbell County.

== Background ==
Clines attended Grant's Lick Elementary School, St. Mary Elementary School, and graduated from Bishop Brossart High School. He earned a Bachelor of Arts in English teaching from Northern Kentucky University before earning a Master of Educational Administration from the University of Cincinnati in 1998. For 27 years, he worked in the Roman Catholic Diocese of Covington school system as a teacher, guidance counselor, and principal. He has three children and three siblings.

== Political career ==
- 2022 Incumbent representative Joseph Fischer chose not to seek reelection in order to run for the 6th district seat on the Kentucky Supreme Court. Clines won the 2022 Republican primary with 2,827 votes (53.8%) and won the 2022 Kentucky House of Representatives election with 11,964 votes (63.4%) against Democratic candidate Kelly Jones.
- 2024 Clines was unopposed in the 2024 Republican primary and won the 2024 Kentucky House of Representatives election with 16,325 votes (65.9%) against Democratic candidate Brandon Long.

Kentucky House of Representatives
Preceded by Joseph Fischer	Member of the Kentucky House of Representatives; 2023–present	Succeeded by incumbent
