= Travis Brenda =

American politician

Member of the Kentucky House of Representatives from the 71st district
- In office January 1, 2019 – January 1, 2021
- Preceded by: Jonathan Shell
- Succeeded by: Josh Bray

Personal details
- Party: Republican

R. Travis Brenda is an American politician from Kentucky who was a member of the Kentucky House of Representatives from 2019 to 2021. Brenda was elected in 2018, defeating incumbent representative Jonathan Shell in the May primary election. He was defeated for renomination in 2020 by Josh Bray.

Brenda was a math teacher before running for office. He decided to run due to discontent of Shell after he introduced and passed an education related proposal.
