= Angie Hatton =

American politician

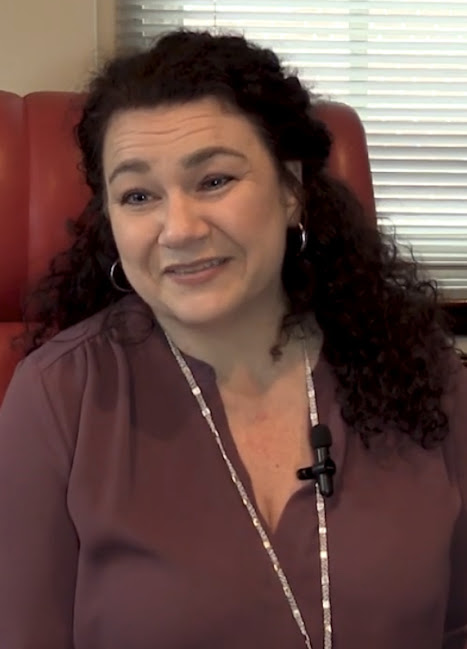
- Hatton in 2023

Chair of the Kentucky Public Service Commission
- Incumbent
- Assumed office August 6, 2024
- Preceded by: Kent Chandler

Member of the Kentucky Public Service Commission
- Incumbent
- Assumed office March 10, 2023
- Preceded by: Marianne Butler

Member of the Kentucky House of Representatives from the 94th district
- In office January 1, 2017 – January 1, 2023
- Preceded by: Leslie A. Combs
- Succeeded by: Jacob Justice

Personal details
- Born: Angie Mullins Hatton; October 28, 1972 (age 53) Whitesburg, Kentucky, U.S.
- Party: Democratic

Angie Mullins Hatton (born October 28, 1972) is an American politician who served in the Kentucky House of Representatives, representing the 94th district from 2017 to 2023. In the 2022 elections, Hatton was defeated by Republican Jacob Justice.

Governor Andy Beshear appointed Hatton to the Kentucky Public Service Commission on March 10, 2023, designating her as vice chair. On August 6, 2024, she was appointed chair of the commission, and was reappointed to a second term on July 3, 2025.
