= Daniel Grossberg =

American politician (born 1978)

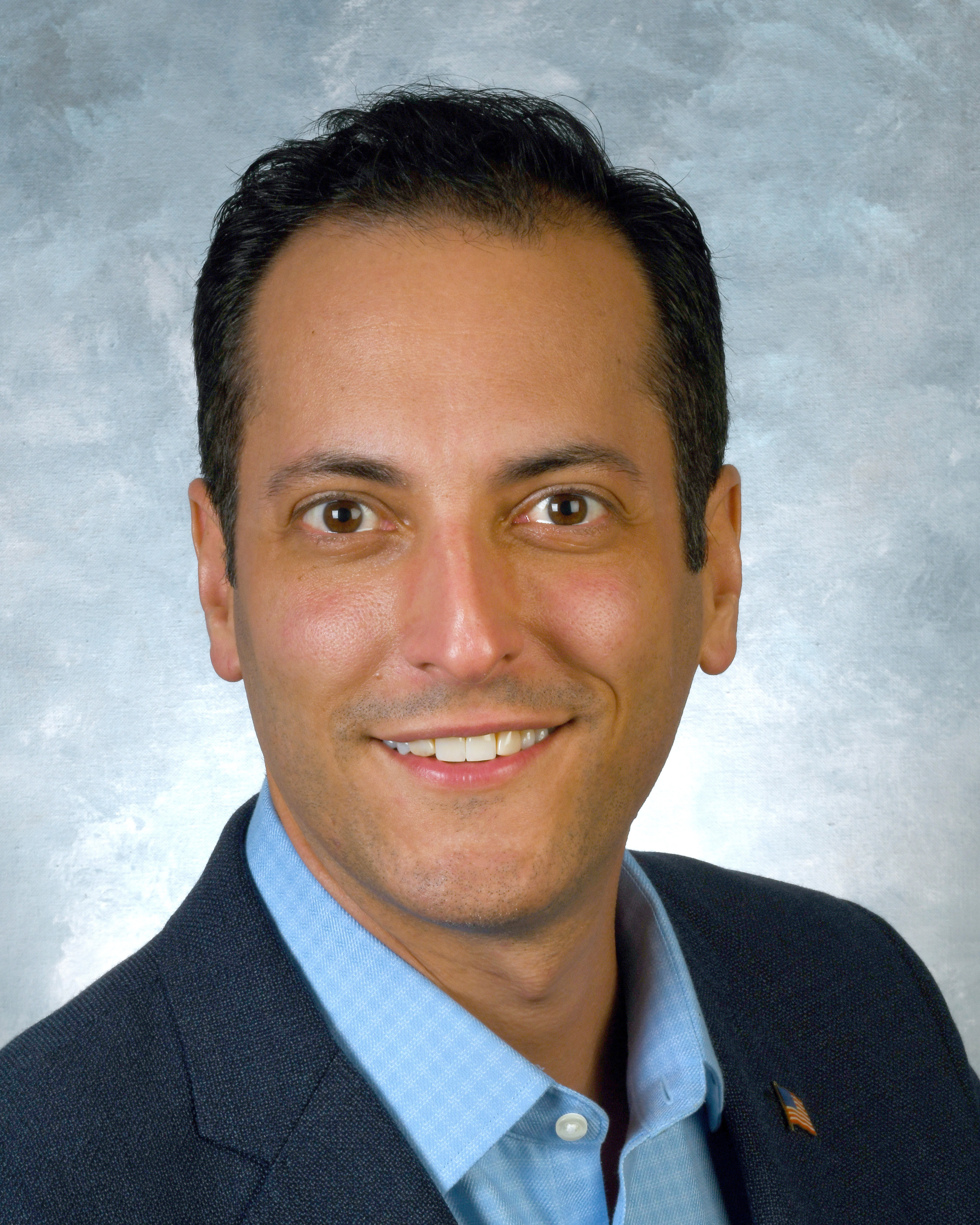
- Official portrait, 2022

Member of the Kentucky House of Representatives from the 30th district
- Incumbent
- Assumed office January 1, 2023
- Preceded by: Tom Burch

Member of the Jefferson County Commission from District A
- In office January 2015 – January 2023
- Preceded by: Furman Wallace
- Succeeded by: Noah Grimes

Personal details
- Born: September 30, 1978 (age 48)
- Party: Democratic
- Education: Grinnell College (BA)
- Profession: Realtor

Military service
- Allegiance: United States
- Branch/service: U.S. Army
- Years of service: 2006-2007

Daniel Benjamin Grossberg (born September 30, 1978) is an American politician who has served as a Democratic member of the Kentucky House of Representatives since January 2023. He represents Kentucky's 30th House district, which is in Louisville. Grossberg was defeated for renomination by Mitra Subedi in the 2026 Kentucky House of Representatives election, finishing last in the three-candidate Democratic primary with 23% of the vote. Grossberg has been the subject of a Kentucky Legislative Ethics Commission investigation and public allegations of inappropriate conduct toward women, including sexual harassment allegations; he has denied wrongdoing.

== Background ==
Grossberg graduated from Teaneck High School in 1996, and went on to earn a Bachelor of Arts in general science from Grinnell College in 2006.

In a 2003 first-person profile in The Advocate, Grossberg wrote that he had “decided to come out about being transgendered,” stating, “I am tired of living my life as a lie. If I could suddenly become a woman, I would do so in a heartbeat.”

He later served in the U.S. Army from 2006 to 2007.

While currently employed as a realtor, Grossberg has previously served as president of the Louisville Metro Democratic Club, a member of the Kentucky Democratic Party's central committee, and member of the Louisville Jewish Community Relations Council.

He is Jewish.

== Political career ==
=== County commission and state legislature ===
Grossberg began his political career in Jefferson County, Kentucky, where he served on the County Commission from 2015 to 2023, working on infrastructure improvements, affordable housing, public education, and community healthcare access.

Since Grossberg has held the position of Kentucky State Representative in 2023, he has been involved in a variety of efforts focus on public safety, civil rights, and healthcare. In 2023, he co-sponsored a bill with Senator Gerald Neal to establish a hate crime law in Kentucky. The proposed legislation aimed to extend prison sentences for crimes motivated by factors such as race, religion, sexual orientation, or gender identity.

In 2024, Grossberg, along with many others, supported legislation in to protect IVF services in Kentucky. The bills that he supported aimed to shield healthcare providers from criminal liability related to IVF procedures, ensuring continued access to reproductive services.

Grossberg also played a role in the formation of Kentucky's antisemitism task force, which focuses on proactive measures to prevent hateful acts. The task force emphasizes education at K-12 and collegiate levels about Jewish identity and related issues.

In 2025, Grossberg introduced House Bill 258, proposing the installation of cameras at approximately 9,000 Jefferson County Public Schools bus stops. This initiative was motivated by incidents of assault on immigrant students at bus stops, aiming to enhance student safety through surveillance.

=== Ethics investigation and allegations ===
In 2024 and 2025, Daniel Grossberg became the subject of an ethics investigation by the Kentucky Legislative Ethics Commission (KLEC). This investigation originated from complaints filed in August 2024 by former state House Democratic leaders Cherlynn Stevenson, Derrick Graham, and Rachel Roberts.

==== Allegations ====
On July 30, 2024, the Lexington Herald-Leader published a story regarding allegations of sexual harassment against Grossberg. According to four independent sources, three of whom were alleged female victims, the Legislative Research Commission had begun an investigation into Grossberg earlier that summer. According to the alleged victims, he had often texted each of them late in the evening with "weird" and "creepy" messages. Grossberg denied the allegations then, and has continued to deny them throughout the investigations.

On August 20, the Herald-Leader published another article in which three more women came forward with new allegations against Grossberg. Identified in the article as Woman A, B, and C, each stated that Grossberg had either messaged them or spoken to them in an inappropriate and sexually charged manner. The next day, Governor Andy Beshear, Lieutenant Governor Jacqueline Coleman, the Louisville Democratic Party, and others spoke out against Grossberg's alleged conduct. On August 29, Beshear made a more forceful statement and said, "I hope Rep. Grossberg is giving serious thought and having discussions with family members about whether a public office is the best or most appropriate place for him to be at this time." The same day, the Louisville Democratic Party barred Grossberg from attending any party events until after the conclusion of the LRC's investigation.

==== Commission findings ====
On July 8, 2025, following nearly a year of inquiry, the Kentucky Legislative Ethics Commission voted to find probable cause that Grossberg violated the state ethics code in 3 of 42 complaints:

- "Conduct related to intimidating statements or actions towards a private business"
- "Attempts to obtain contributions in exchange for possible state catering business or private company"
- "Conduct relating to his interactions with an individual at the Capitol Annex, before, during, and after a committee meeting in July 2023 and in his office at the annex involving inappropriate treatment of that person"

At this time, a public adjudicatory hearing will be scheduled. The commission also extended Grossberg and his attorneys the option to pursue a settlement.

==== Allegations dismissed ====
The majority of allegations made against Grossberg were dismissed. Claims such as that he sent women "weird" or "creepy" messages, and that he acted improperly in assisting a House Democratic colleague who had reported harassment, were dropped.

Additional allegations in the initial complaint included accusations of using "public office to obtain private benefit", including an "improper" car purchase. Another claim involved Grossberg sending a letter to Jefferson County Public Schools students who went on an overseas trip he chaperoned, sponsored by his wife, offering assistance with "college admission, scholarships, loans or any other government benefit" and stating that he would "even help you out if you ever get in trouble." A JCPS investigation into the trip found there was "an insufficient amount of evidence" to substantiate these claims.

Grossberg was also accused of telling a colleague that he "could stop the person from making the harassing communications" insinuating that he had some control over the sender or the harassing correspondence. Other claims regarding alleged inappropriate conduct with lobbyists, advocates, and staff were also dismissed.

A second ethics complaint, filed in November 2024, detailed additional alleged behavior that the complainant said "constituted as sexual harassment" and made them feel "wildly uncomfortable." These allegations were not included in the commission's probable cause findings.

==== Proposed settlement ====
In June 2025, the commission offered Grossberg an agreed order to resolve the matter. Under the proposed settlement, the commission state that "probable cause may exist to believe" Grossberg violated state law in two instances. Once during a meeting with a "volunteer issue advocate" in his legislative office, and by sending private social media requests to a legislative employee. All other alleged violations would have been dismissed if Grossberg agreed to:

- Pay a $4,000 fine
- Receive a public reprimand from the commission
- Waive his right to bring civil action against the commission or individuals involved in the investigation

Grossberg declined to signed the proposed settlement, though he later agreed to pay a reduced amount of $2,000 in early February 2026.

==== Response ====
Grossberg has consistently maintained his innocence throughout the investigation and has declined to resign from office, despite calls for his resignation from various sources. Grossberg did release a public statement on July 11, 2025, to his social media stating the following regarding the commission's findings:

"After almost a year of investigations, the Ethics Commission cleared me of 39 bogus allegations this week. I am confident they will dismiss the remaining three allegations in a fair hearing with sworn witnesses under penalty of perjury. Despite political smears and unproven sensationalism by the Lexington paper the commission did not charge that there was probable cause on any sexual harassment. The commission found no sexual harassment took place..."

==== 2026 allegation by former college classmate ====
In May 2026, the Lexington Herald-Leader reported that Christina Ross, a former classmate of Grossberg at Grinnell College, alleged that Grossberg assaulted her in 2005, when she was an 18-year-old freshman and he was a 26-year-old senior. Ross alleged that he had initiated contact when she was 17 years old. According to the newspaper, Ross's account was documented in a 2005 Grinnell Police Department report after she reported Grossberg's behavior to campus security, which then reported it to local police.

Ross told the newspaper that Grossberg repeatedly asked her for sex, that she refused, and that he grabbed her wrist and tried to prevent her from leaving her dorm room. The Herald-Leader reported that the Grinnell Police Department confirmed the authenticity of the police report and that two former classmates corroborated aspects of Ross's account. Grossberg denied the allegation, stating that he had never previously heard the claims and that the alleged incident "did not happen".

Following publication of the report, Kentucky Democratic Party chair Colmon Elridge renewed his call for Grossberg to resign.

=== Elections ===
- 2015 Grossberg was defeated in the 2015 Democratic primary for Kentucky State Treasurer, garnering 18,284 votes (11.2%) against a crowded field of candidates.
- 2018 Grossberg was unopposed in both the 2018 Democratic primary for Jefferson County Commissioner District A and the 2018 Kentucky general election, winning the latter with 200,905 votes.
- 2020 Grossberg was defeated in the 2020 Democratic primary for Kentucky's 30th House district, garnering 3,290 votes (41.2%) against incumbent Tom Burch.
- 2022 Grossberg won the 2022 Democratic primary for Kentucky's 30th House district with 1,840 votes (44.9%), unseating incumbent Tom Burch. He was unopposed in the 2022 Kentucky House of Representatives election, winning with 8,015 votes.
- 2024 Grossberg won the 2024 Democratic primary with 1,629 votes (50.8%) and was unopposed in the 2024 Kentucky House of Representatives election, winning with 10,125 votes.
- 2026 Grossberg was defeated for renomination in the 2026 Democratic primary for Kentucky's 30th House district, finishing last in a three-candidate field with 1,096 votes (23%). Mitra Subedi won the primary with 2,095 votes (45%), while Cassie Lyles received 1,495 votes (32%). WDRB reported that Subedi had "nearly doubl[ed] the vote total" for Grossberg.

== Electoral history ==
=== 2014 ===
2014 Jefferson County Commission district A election
Party	Candidate	Votes	%
Democratic	Daniel B. Grossberg	124,983	54.2
Republican	Tom Burdette	105,574	45.8
Total votes		230,557	100.0
Democratic gain from Republican			

=== 2015 ===
Democratic primary results
Party	Candidate	Votes	%
Democratic	Rick Nelson	44,411	27.3
Democratic	Neville Blakemore	36,665	22.5
Democratic	Richard Henderson	32,389	19.9
Democratic	Jim Glenn	31,153	19.1
Democratic	Daniel B. Grossberg	18,285	11.2
Total votes		162,903	100.0

=== 2018 ===
2018 Jefferson County Commission district A election
Party	Candidate	Votes	%
Democratic	Daniel B. Grossberg (incumbent)	Unopposed	
Total votes		200,905	100.0
Democratic hold			

=== 2020 ===
Democratic primary results
Party	Candidate	Votes	%
Democratic	Tom Burch (incumbent)	4,692	58.8
Democratic	Daniel Grossberg	3,290	41.2
Total votes		7,982	100.0

=== 2022 ===
Democratic primary results
Party	Candidate	Votes	%
Democratic	Daniel Grossberg	1,840	44.9
Democratic	Tom Burch (incumbent)	1,719	42.0
Democratic	Neal Turpin	536	13.1
Total votes		4,095	100.0

2022 Kentucky House of Representatives 30th district election
Party	Candidate	Votes	%
Democratic	Daniel Grossberg	Unopposed	
Total votes		8,015	100.0
Democratic hold			

=== 2024 ===
Democratic primary results
Party	Candidate	Votes	%
Democratic	Daniel Grossberg (incumbent)	1,629	50.8
Democratic	Mitra Subedi	1,579	49.2
Total votes		3,208	100.0

2024 Kentucky House of Representatives 30th district election
Party	Candidate	Votes	%
Democratic	Daniel Grossberg (incumbent)	Unopposed	
Total votes		10,125	100.0
Democratic hold			

=== 2026 ===
Democratic primary results
Party	Candidate	Votes	%
Democratic	Mitra Subedi	2,095	44.7
Democratic	Cassie Lyles	1,495	31.9
Democratic	Daniel Grossberg (incumbent)	1,096	23.4
Total votes		4,686	100.0

Kentucky House of Representatives
Preceded by Tom Burch	Member of the Kentucky House of Representatives; 2023–present	Succeeded by incumbent
