= Kentucky Public Service Commission =

Agency overview
- Formed: 1934
- Jurisdiction: Kentucky
- Headquarters: 211 Sower Blv., Frankfort, Kentucky, 40602
- Agency executives: Angie Hatton, Chair; Mary Pat Regan, Commissioner

The Kentucky Public Service Commission is the public utilities commission for the State of Kentucky.

The commission is a quasi-judicial regulatory tribunal. It regulates the intrastate rates and services of investor-owned electric, natural gas, telephone, water and sewage utilities, customer-owned electric and telephone cooperatives, water districts and associations, and certain aspects of gas pipelines in the state.
