= Jim Maggard =

American politician

Member of the Kentucky House of Representatives from the 89th district
- In office January 1, 1982 – January 1, 1997
- Preceded by: Porter Reynolds
- Succeeded by: Marie Rader

Personal details
- Party: Democratic

James Potter Maggard (born May 16, 1946) is an American politician from Kentucky who was a member of the Kentucky House of Representatives from 1982 to 1997. Maggard was first elected in 1981 after incumbent representative Porter Reynolds retired. He was defeated for reelection in 1996 by Republican Marie Rader.
