= Marie Rader =

American politician

Member of the Kentucky House of Representatives from the 89th district
- In office January 1, 1997 – December 2017
- Preceded by: Jim Maggard
- Succeeded by: Robert Goforth

Personal details
- Party: Republican

Marie L. Rader (born June 10, 1941) is a former Republican member of the Kentucky House of Representatives. She served in the Kentucky House from 1997 until December 2017. Rader was first elected to the state house in 1996, defeating Democratic incumbent Jim Maggard. She resigned from the house in December 2017.

== Education ==
Rader attended Berea College.

== Career ==
In 2017, Rader resigned from the house for health reasons. At the time, she chaired the House Committee on Transportation and was a member of the Natural Resources and Energy Committee.

== Elections ==
=== 2014 election ===
In the newly redrawn 89th district that now consist of Northern Laurel County, Southern Madison County, and Jackson County; Marie Rader faced Michael Bryant of London, KY and Gerardo Serrano of Tyner, KY in the Republican Primary. Rader, the winner, faced educator Joey Jayson Taylor II in the General Election on November 4, 2014. Taylor automatically clinched the Democratic Nomination because he was unopposed in the Democratic primary on May 20, 2014. This race was rated in the Top 10 state house races in 2014 by the CN2 News Network.

=== 2016 election ===
In 2016, Rader ran uncontested for the 89th district.
