= Timmy Truett =

American politician

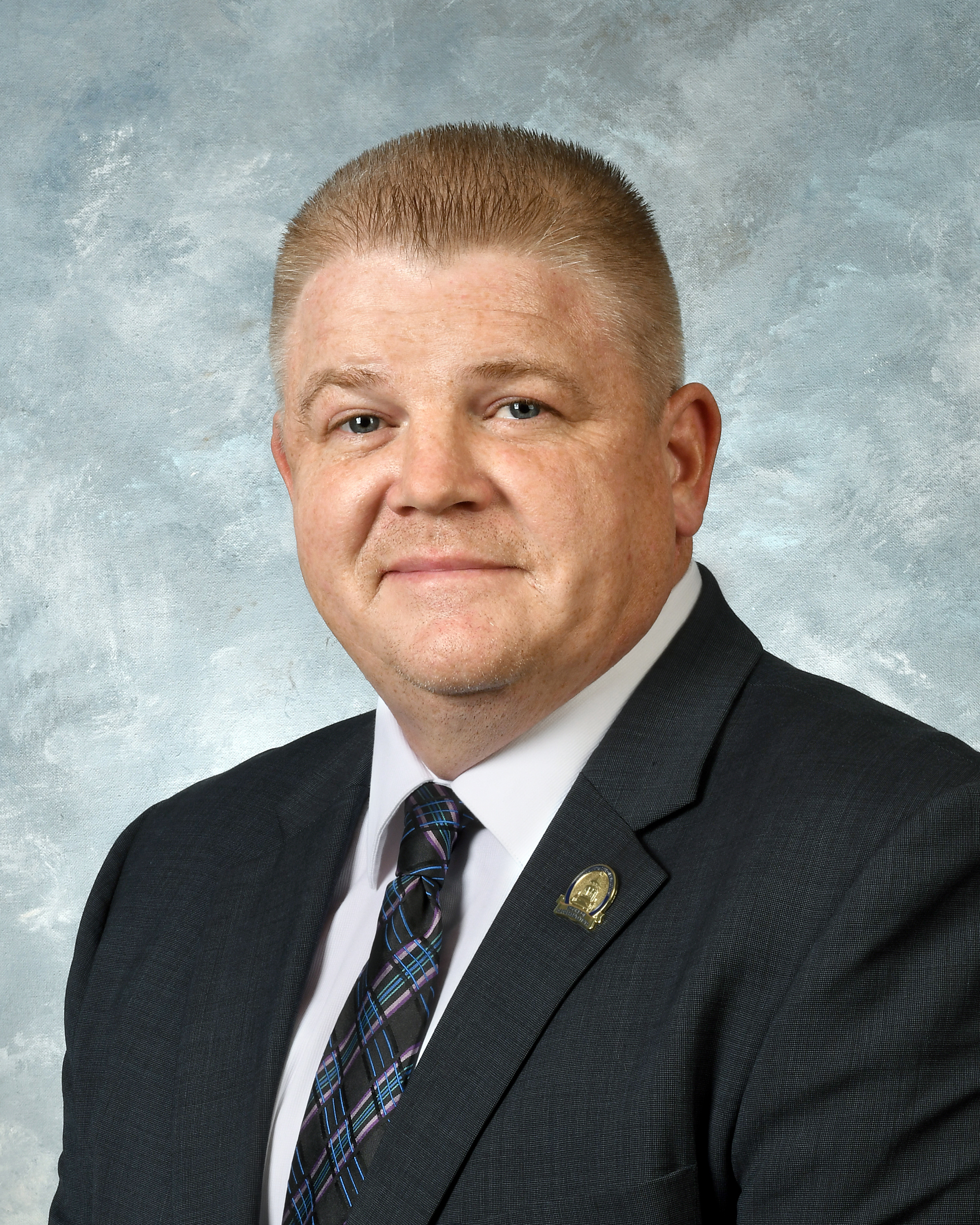

Member of the Kentucky House of Representatives from the 89th district
- Incumbent
- Assumed office November 23, 2021
- Preceded by: Robert Goforth

Personal details
- Born: Timothy Truett; December 1, 1977 (age 48) McKee, KY
- Party: Republican
- Children: 3
- Committees: Appropriations & Revenue; Economic Development & Workforce Investment; Primary & Secondary Education; Tourism & Outdoor Recreation

Timothy Dallas Truett (born December 1, 1977) is an American politician and educator who has served as a Republican member of the Kentucky House of Representatives from Kentucky's 89th House district since November 2021. His district includes Jackson, Lee, and Wolfe counties as well as parts of Laurel and Madison counties.

== Background ==
Truett has worked as a pastor, educator, and small business owner. He is currently the principal of McKee Elementary School in McKee, Kentucky.

== Political career ==
=== Elections ===
- 2021 Kentucky's 89th House district incumbent Robert Goforth resigned from his seat after being charged with domestic violence. Truett won the 2021 Kentucky House of Representatives special election with 3,859 votes (77.9%) against Democratic candidate Maetinee Suramek.
- 2022 Truett was unopposed in the 2022 Republican primary and won the 2022 Kentucky House of Representatives election with 10,756 votes (77.1%) against Democratic candidate Brittany Oliver.
- 2024 Truett won the 2024 Republican primary with 3,018 votes (89%) against challenger Idalia Holland, and was unopposed in the 2024 Kentucky House of Representatives election, winning with 17,867 votes.
