= Marianne Proctor =

American politician (born 1968)

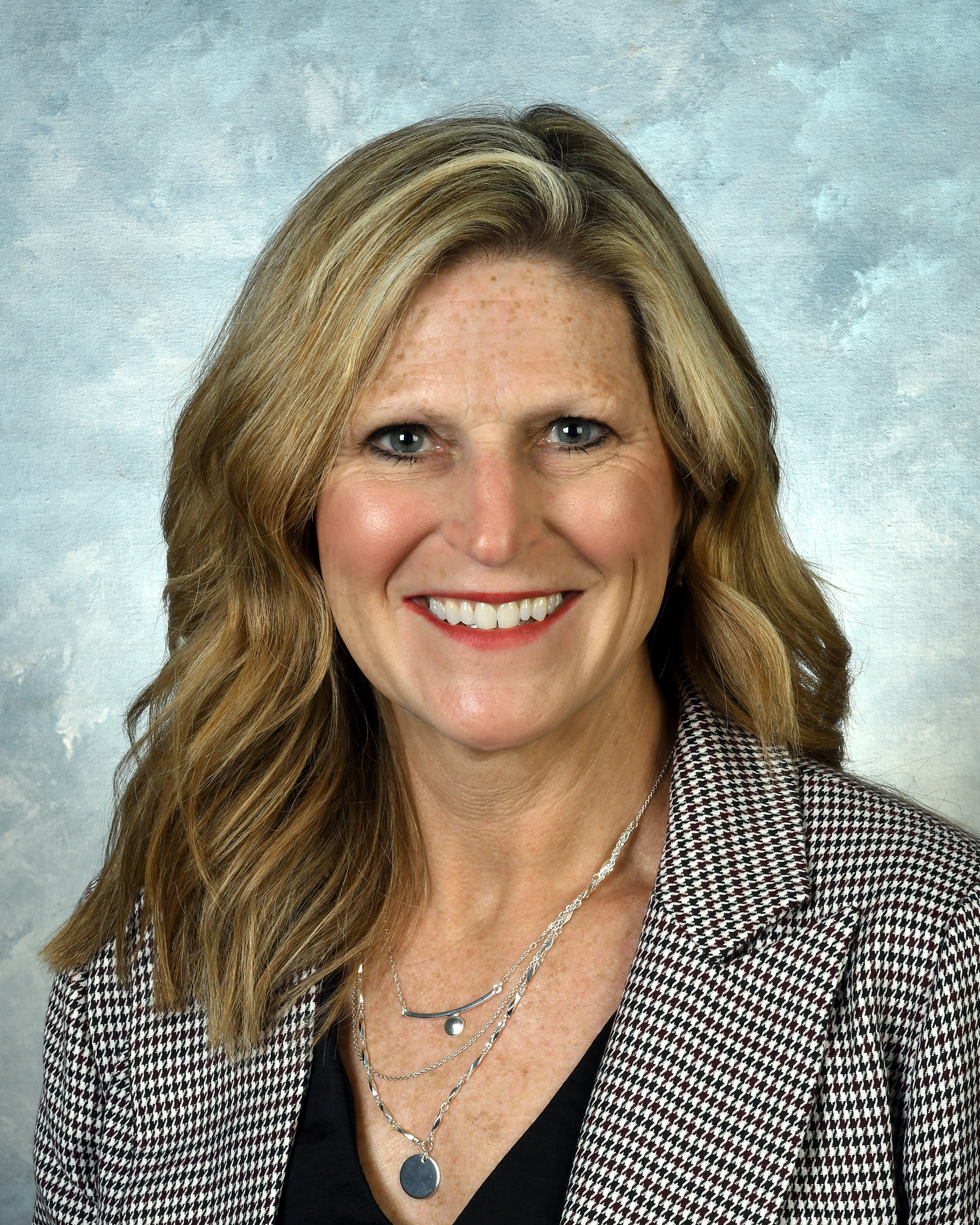

Member of the Kentucky House of Representatives from the 60th district
- Incumbent
- Assumed office January 1, 2023
- Preceded by: Sal Santoro

Personal details
- Born: February 24, 1968 (age 58) Flint, Michigan, US
- Party: Republican
- Education: Texas A&M University (BS), University of Texas at Dallas (MS)
- Committees: Families & Children; Local Government; Veterans, Military Affairs, & Public Protection
- Website: https://proctorky.com/

Marianne Proctor (born February 24, 1968) is an American politician and Republican member of the Kentucky House of Representatives from Kentucky's 60th House district. Her district comprises parts of Boone County.

== Background ==
Proctor was born on February 24, 1968, in Flint, Michigan. She earned a Bachelor of Science in health from Texas A&M University in 1990, and a Master of Science in communication disorders from the University of Texas at Dallas in 1993.

Proctor is currently employed as a speech language pathologist in Union, Kentucky. She also serves as a precinct chair of the Boone County Republican Party, and is an active member of the Northern Kentucky Tea Party.

== Political career ==
- 2022 Proctor won the 2022 Republican primary with 1,958 votes (51.7%) against incumbent representative Sal Santoro and was unopposed in the 2022 Kentucky House of Representatives election, winning with 12,490 votes.
- 2024 Proctor won the 2024 Republican primary with 3,153 votes (76.5%) and won the 2024 Kentucky House of Representatives election with 16,017 votes (66.5%) against Democratic candidate Deborah Flowers.
