= Jacob Justice =

American politician

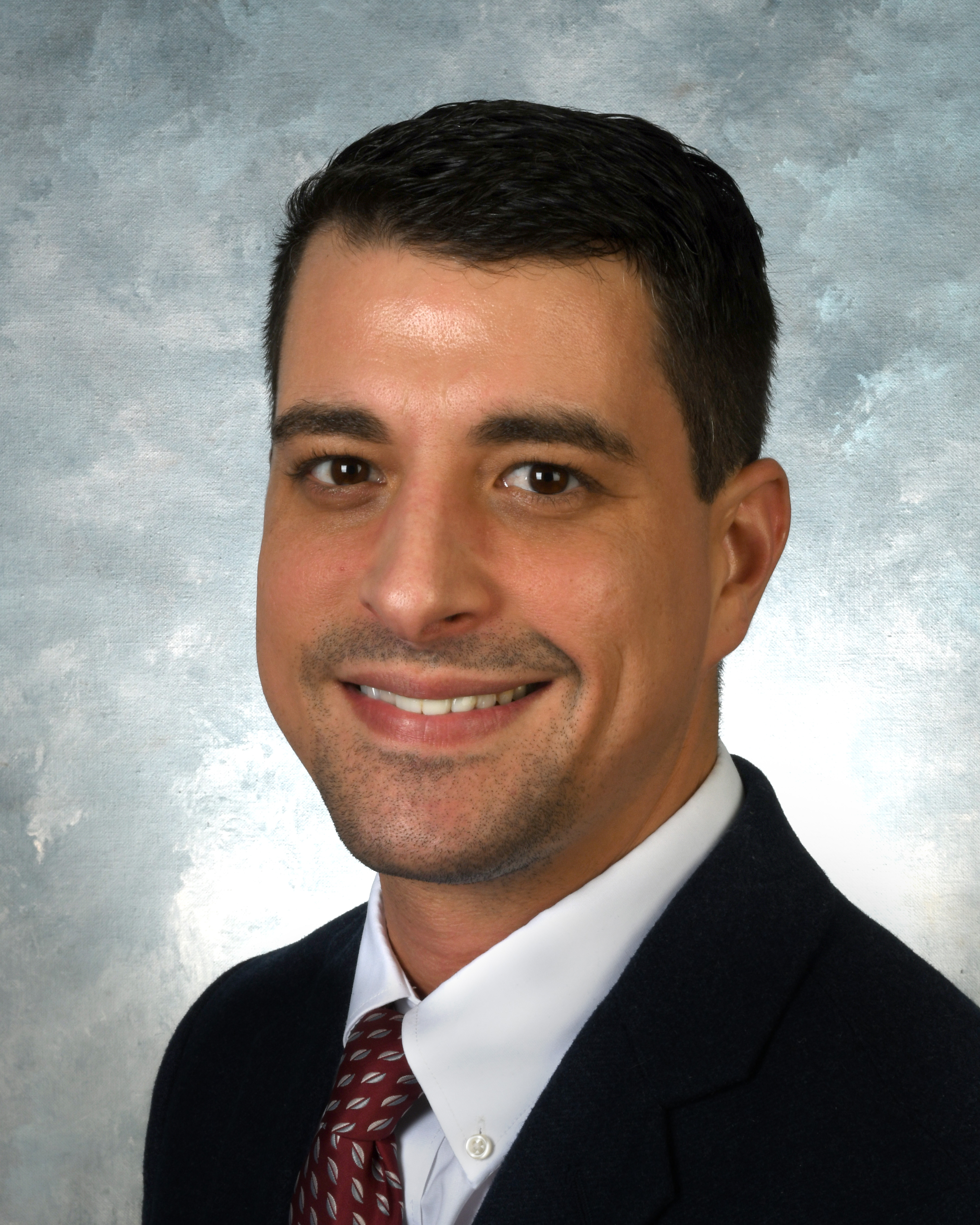

Member of the Kentucky House of Representatives from the 94th district
- In office January 1, 2023 – January 1, 2025
- Preceded by: Angie Hatton
- Succeeded by: Mitch Whitaker

Personal details
- Born: November 6, 1988 (age 37) Pikeville, Kentucky
- Party: Republican
- Children: 3
- Occupation: Dentist
- Committees: Banking & Insurance; Health Services; Local Government

Jacob D. Justice (born September 6, 1988) is an American politician who served as a Republican member of the Kentucky House of Representatives from Kentucky's 94th House district. His district included Letcher County as well as parts of Harlan and Pike counties.

He did not seek reelection in 2024.

== Background ==
Justice was born on September 6, 1988, in Pikeville, Kentucky. After graduating from East Ridge High School, he earned an associate degree from the Kentucky Community and Technical College System in 2009 and a Bachelor of Science in biology from the University of Pikeville in 2013. In 2017, Justice earned his Doctor of Dental Medicine degree from the University of Louisville. After graduation, Justice joined his father's dental practice in Elkhorn City.

Outside of politics, Justice serves as a member of the Pike County Health Department's Board of Directors and is an active Shriner.

== Political career ==
- 2020 Justice won a seat on the Elkhorn City Council with 326 votes (14.8%).
- 2022 Justice won the 2022 Republican primary with 1,677 votes (51.5%) and won the 2022 Kentucky House of Representatives election with 7,331 votes (56.7%) against Kentucky's 94th House district Democratic incumbent and House Minority Whip Angie Hatton.
