= Josh Bray (politician) =

American politician from Kentucky (born 1985)

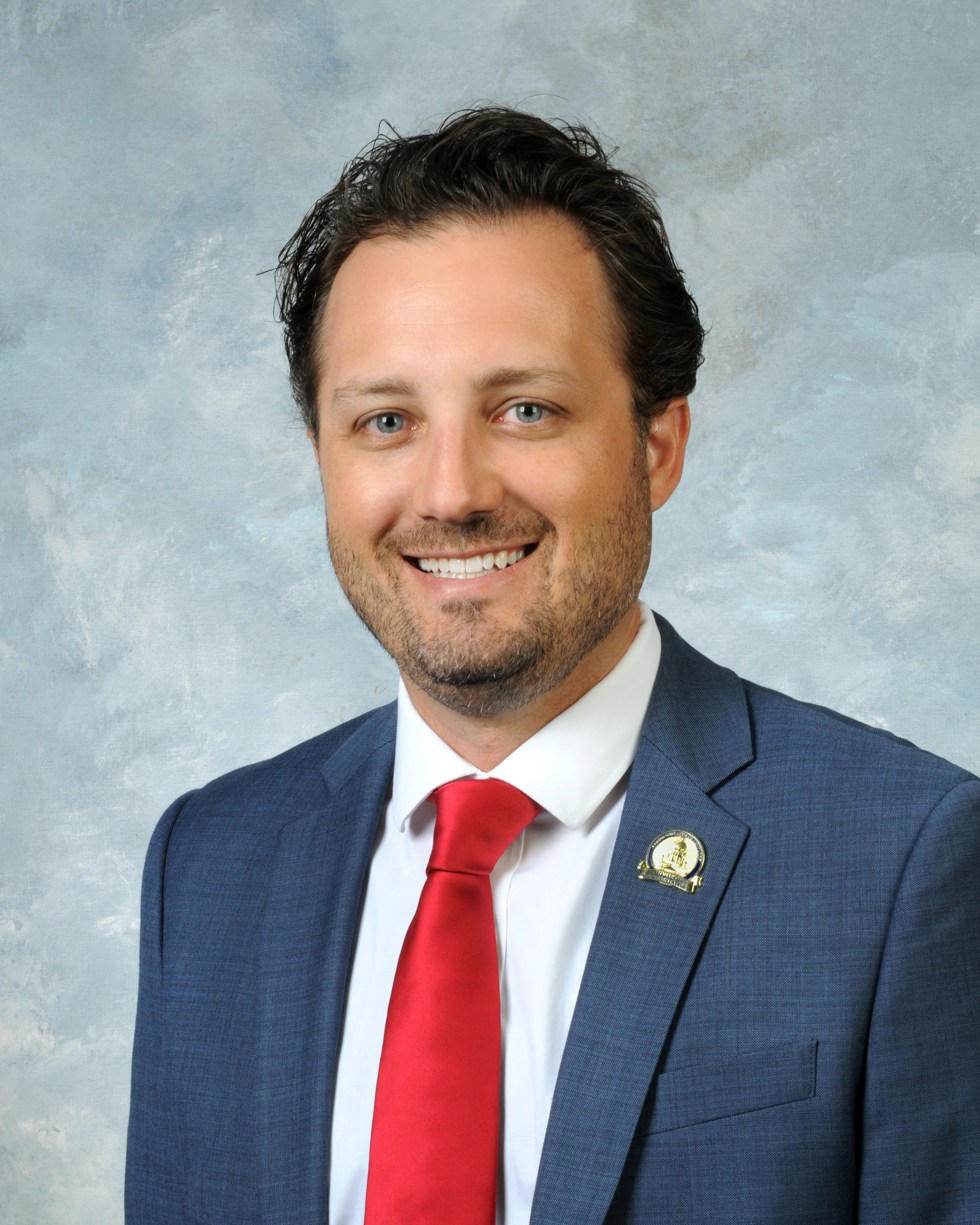

Majority Whip of the Kentucky House of Representatives
- Incumbent
- Assumed office November 10, 2026
- Preceded by: Jason Nemes

Member of the Kentucky House of Representatives from the 71st district
- Incumbent
- Assumed office January 1, 2021
- Preceded by: Travis Brenda

Personal details
- Born: March 29, 1985 (age 41)
- Party: Republican
- Spouse: Jana Bray
- Children: 2
- Education: Bachelor of Business Administration
- Profession: Farmer
- Committees: Appropriations and Revenue (Vice Chair); Banking and Insurance; Local Government; Judiciary

Joshua Crawford Bray (born March 29, 1985) is an American politician who has served as a Republican member of the Kentucky House of Representatives since January 2021, and as House Majority Whip since November 2026. He represents Kentucky's 71st House district, which consists of Rockcastle County as well as parts of Laurel, Madison, and Pulaski. He previously served as city administrator of Mount Vernon, Kentucky. Outside of politics, he is a beef farmer.

He is widely regarded as the legislature's leader in autonomous car legislation.

== Background ==
Bray earned a Bachelor of Business Administration from Eastern Kentucky University.

He identifies as a Baptist.

== Political career ==
=== Leadership ===
Following the defeat of incumbent House Majority Whip Jason Nemes in the 2026 Kentucky House of Representatives elections, Bray was elected to succeed him in the position by the House's Republican caucus.

=== Elections ===
- 2020 Bray won the 2020 Republican primary with 4,107 votes (50.2%) against incumbent representative Travis Brenda and was unopposed in the 2020 Kentucky House of Representatives election, winning with 19,879 votes.
- 2022 Bray was unopposed in both the 2022 republican primary, and the 2022 Kentucky House of Representatives election, winning the latter with 10,124 votes.
- 2024 Bray was unopposed in the 2024 republican primary, and won the 2024 Kentucky House of Representatives election with 15,168 votes (77.7%) against Democratic candidate Rachelle Riddle.

Kentucky House of Representatives
Preceded by Travis Brenda	Member of the Kentucky House of Representatives; 2021–present	Succeeded by incumbent
