= Robert Goforth =

American politician

Member of the Kentucky House of Representatives from the 89th district
- In office March 6, 2018 – August 24, 2021
- Preceded by: Marie Rader
- Succeeded by: Timmy Truett

Personal details
- Born: 1975 or 1976 (age 50–51)
- Party: Republican
- Spouse: Ashley
- Children: 4
- Education: University of Kentucky (BS); Massachusetts College of Pharmacy and Health Sciences (PharmD)

Military service
- Branch/service: United States Army
- Years of service: 1994–1996

Robert Goforth (born February 27, 1976) is an American politician and pharmacist who served as a member of the Kentucky House of Representatives for the 89th district from 2018 to 2021.

== Early life and education ==
Goforth is from East Bernstadt, Kentucky. He earned a bachelor's degree from the University of Kentucky and a Doctor of Pharmacy from Massachusetts College of Pharmacy and Health Sciences.

== Career ==
Goforth served as a combat engineer in the United States Army from 1994 to 1996. He was first elected to the Kentucky House in February 2018. Goforth challenged incumbent Republican governor Matt Bevin in the 2019 gubernatorial election, getting roughly 40 percent of the vote in the primary election.

Goforth sought re-election despite his indictment, and was condemned by a number of pro-family groups, including Kentucky for Strong Families. He was re-elected in 2020 with 70% of the vote. He resigned from office in August 2021, while still facing charges.

== Personal life ==
In April 2020, Goforth was arrested on charges relating to domestic violence. The Laurel County Sheriff's Office charged Goforth with first-degree strangulation, fourth-degree domestic assault and third-degree terroristic threatening for physically assaulting his wife, attempting to hog-tie her and strangling her with an Ethernet cord. He was taken to the Laurel County Detention Center. In September 2020, Goforth was indicted on one count of first-degree strangulation and one count of assault in the fourth degree.

In May 2022 Goforth was convicted of fraud.
