= Lamin Swann =

American politician and businessman (1977–2023)

Member of the Kentucky House of Representatives from the 93rd district
- In office January 1, 2023 – May 14, 2023
- Preceded by: Norma Kirk-McCormick (redistricting)
- Succeeded by: Adrielle Camuel

Personal details
- Born: December 2, 1977
- Died: May 14, 2023 (aged 45)
- Party: Democratic
- Education: University of Kentucky

Lamin Swann (December 2, 1977 – May 14, 2023) was an American politician and businessman who was a Democratic member of the Kentucky House of Representatives from January 2023 until his death later that year.

== Background ==
Lamin Swann was born on December 2, 1977. A native of Lexington, Kentucky, he first became involved in politics at age eight, after attending a demonstration with his grandfather at the Kentucky State Capitol, advocating for Martin Luther King Jr. Day to become a recognized holiday in Kentucky. He graduated from Tates Creek High School and the University of Kentucky, where he studied social work and wrote for the university newspaper.

Swann had cerebral palsy and had publicly discussed his experiences living with the condition.

== Career ==
Swann was a social worker within the Fayette County Family Court system, and founded a women's fashion label in Lexington. He was active in civil rights protests.

Swann was elected to the Kentucky House of Representatives in 2022, as the member for the 93rd district. He introduced and supported bills to prevent discrimination in awarding Section 8 housing, protect access to abortion, and to end a state holiday of the Robert E. Lee Day.

== Death ==
On May 9, 2023, Swann was hospitalized for an undisclosed medical emergency. He died five days later, on May 14, at the age of 45.
