= Norma Kirk-McCormick =

American politician

Member of the Kentucky House of Representatives from the 93rd district
- In office January 1, 2021 – January 1, 2023
- Preceded by: Chris Harris
- Succeeded by: Lamin Swann (redistricting)

Personal details
- Party: Republican

Norma Kirk-McCormick is an American politician from Kentucky who was a member of the Kentucky House of Representatives from 2021 to 2023. Kirk-McCormick was first elected in 2020 after incumbent representative Chris Harris retired to run for the Kentucky Supreme Court. Following the 2022 redistricting of the house, the 93rd district was moved from eastern Kentucky to Lexington. Kirk-McCormick instead ran in the 97th district, losing the Republican nomination to incumbent Bobby McCool.
