= Joseph Fischer (Kentucky politician) =

American politician

Member of the Kentucky House of Representatives from the 68th district
- In office January 1, 1999 – January 1, 2023
- Preceded by: Katie Kratz Stine
- Succeeded by: Mike Clines

Personal details
- Born: November 14, 1954 (age 71) Covington, Kentucky
- Party: Republican
- Education: Holy Cross College; University of Cincinnati College of Law

Joseph Michael Fischer (born November 14, 1954, in Covington, Kentucky) is an American politician and a Republican member of the Kentucky House of Representatives representing District 68 from 1999 to 2023.

== Education ==
Fischer earned his BA from Holy Cross College and his JD from the University of Cincinnati College of Law.

== Policies ==
Fischer is a supporter of the Tea Party movement. He also supports increasing the statewide sales tax to 7%.

Fischer, who is anti-abortion, sponsored a trigger law in Kentucky which passed in 2019, and was the lead sponsor of an anti-abortion constitutional amendment that voters rejected in 2022. He was sanctioned in 2022 by the Judicial Conduct Commission for running an overtly partisan campaign for Kentucky Supreme Court Justice, an election race that the Constitution of Kentucky designates as nonpartisan, and in which he subsequently lost to the incumbent justice.

== Elections ==
- 1998 When District 68 Representative Katie Kratz Stine ran for Kentucky Senate and left the seat open, Fischer won the three-way 1998 Republican Primary and won the November 3, 1998 General election against Democratic nominee James Daley.
- 2000 Fischer was unopposed for both the 2000 Republican Primary and the November 7, 2000 General election, winning with 12,641 votes.
- 2002 Fischer was unopposed for both the 2002 Republican Primary and the November 5, 2002 General election, winning with 8,672 votes.
- 2004 Fischer was unopposed for both the 2004 Republican Primary and the November 2, 2004 General election, winning with 14,762 votes.
- 2006 Fischer was unopposed for the 2006 Republican Primary and won the November 7, 2006 General election with 7,646 votes (53.0%) against Democratic nominee Linda Klembara.
- 2008 Fischer was unopposed for both the 2008 Republican Primary and the November 4, 2008 General election, winning with 16,690 votes.
- 2010 Fischer was unopposed for both the May 18, 2010 Republican Primary and the November 2, 2010 General election, winning with 12,210 votes.
- 2012 Fischer was unopposed for both the May 22, 2012 Republican Primary and the November 6, 2012 General election, winning with 16,795 votes.
- In 2022, Fischer lost a bid for Kentucky Supreme Court Justice against incumbent Michelle M. Keller.
