= 2026 Kentucky House of Representatives election =

- November 3, 2026

All 100 seats in the Kentucky House of Representatives 51 seats needed for a majority
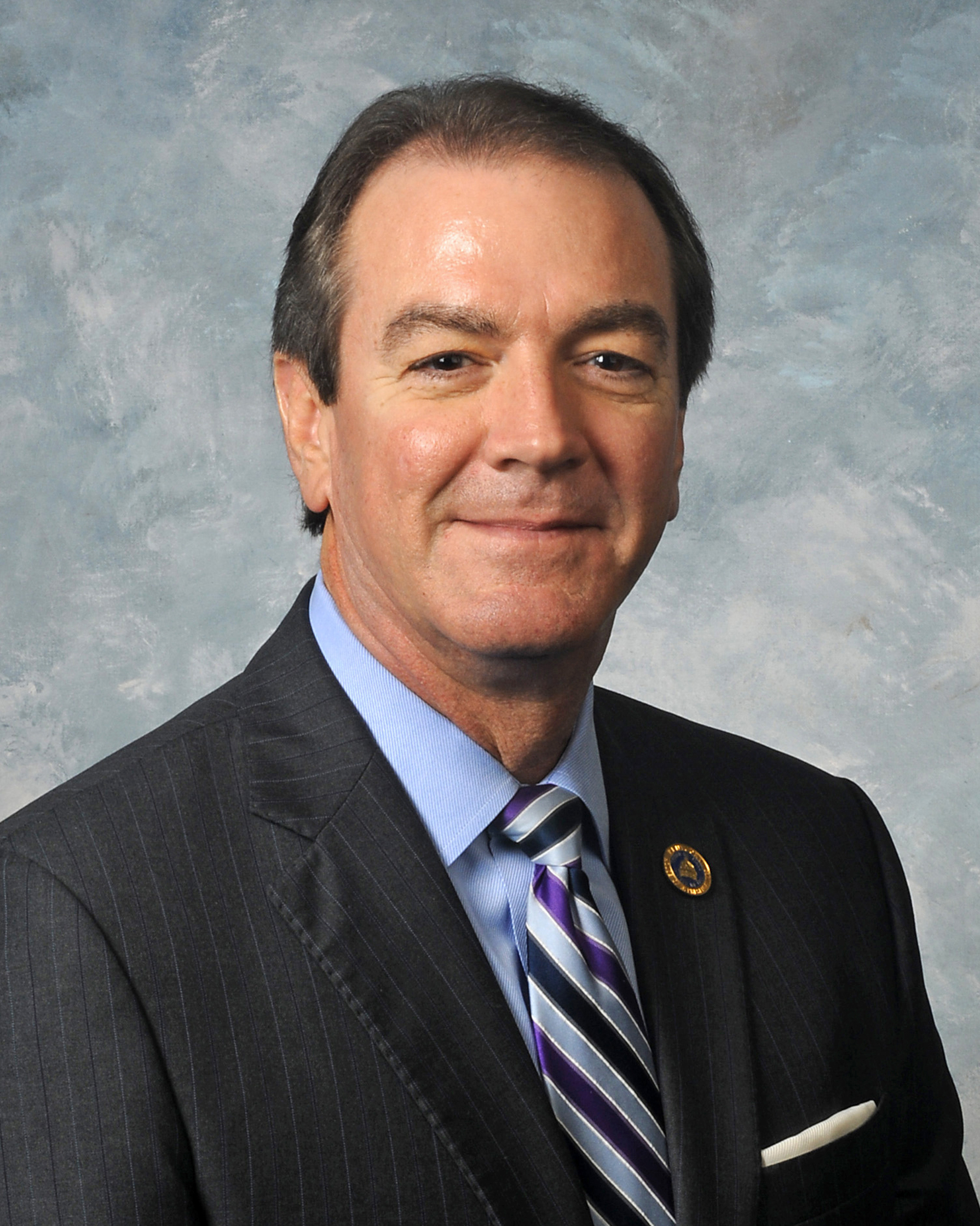

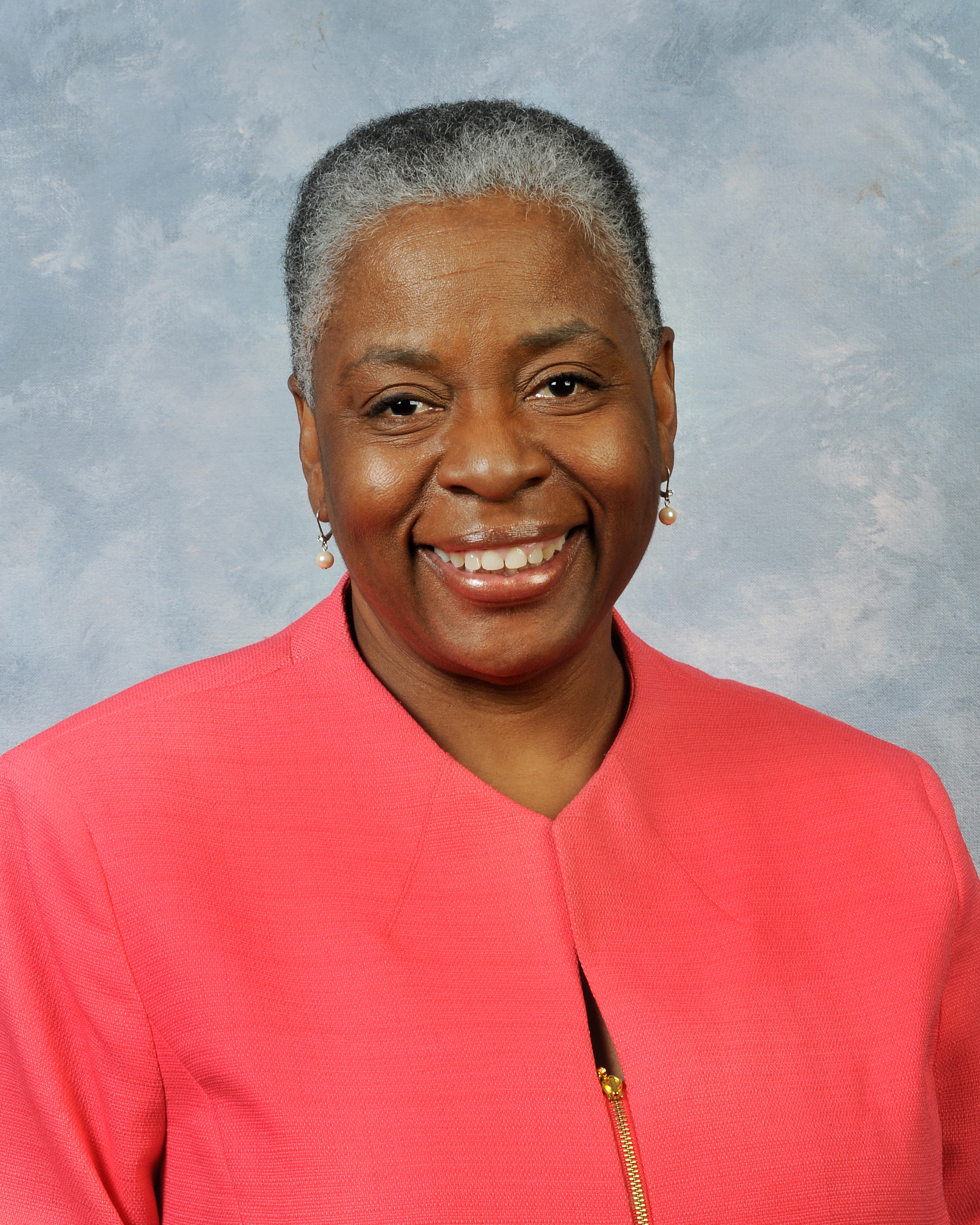
	Majority party	Minority party
Leader	David W. Osborne	Pamela Stevenson (retired)
Party	Republican	Democratic
Leader since	January 8, 2018	January 7, 2025
Leader's seat	59th – Prospect	43rd – Louisville
Last election	80	20
Seats won	74	26
Seat change	▼6	▲6
- Results of the elections: Democratic hold Democratic gain Republican hold Republican gain
Speaker before election
David W. Osborne
Republican
Elected Speaker
David W. Osborne
Republican

The 2026 Kentucky House of Representatives election was held on November 3, 2026. The Republican and Democratic primary elections were held on May 19. Following the 2024 election, Republicans and Democrats held 80 and 20 seats, respectively. The deadline for candidates to file was January 9, 2026. Republicans maintained their majority, losing six seats.

== Overview ==
Party	Candidates		Votes	%	Seats		
Party	Opposed	Unopposed	Votes	%	Before	After	+/−
Republican	49	42	803,612	64.00	80	74	-6
Democratic	49	8	444,532	35.40	20	26	+6
Independent	1	0	6,939	0.55	0	0	-
Kentucky	1	0	505	0.04	0	0	-
Write-in	1	0	73	0.01	N/A	N/A	N/A
Total	101	50	1,255,661	100.0	100	100	±0

== Summary by district ==
† – Incumbent did not seek reelection

District	Incumbent	Party	Elected	Party
1	Steven Rudy	Rep	Steven Rudy	Rep
2	Kim Holloway	Rep	Kim Holloway	Rep
3	Randy Bridges	Rep	Randy Bridges	Rep
4	Wade Williams	Rep	Wade Williams	Rep
5	Mary Beth Imes	Rep	Mary Beth Imes	Rep
6	Chris Freeland	Rep	Chris Freeland	Rep
7	Suzanne Miles	Rep	Suzanne Miles	Rep
8	Walker Thomas	Rep	Walker Thomas	Rep
9	Myron Dossett	Rep	Myron Dossett	Rep
10	Josh Calloway	Rep	Josh Calloway	Rep
11	J. T. Payne	Rep	J. T. Payne	Rep
12	Jim Gooch Jr.	Rep	Jim Gooch Jr.	Rep
13	DJ Johnson	Rep	DJ Johnson	Rep
14	Scott Lewis†	Rep	Wes Pate	Rep
15	Rebecca Raymer	Rep	Rebecca Raymer	Rep
16	Jason Petrie	Rep	Jason Petrie	Rep
17	Robert Duvall	Rep	Robert Duvall	Rep
18	Samara Heavrin	Rep	Samara Heavrin	Rep
19	Michael Meredith	Rep	Michael Meredith	Rep
20	Kevin Jackson	Rep	Kevin Jackson	Rep
21	Amy Neighbors	Rep	Amy Neighbors	Rep
22	Shawn McPherson	Rep	Shawn McPherson	Rep
23	Steve Riley	Rep	Steve Riley	Rep
24	Ryan Bivens	Rep	Ryan Bivens	Rep
25	Steve Bratcher	Rep	Steve Bratcher	Rep
26	Peyton Griffee	Rep	Peyton Griffee	Rep
27	Nancy Tate†	Rep	Joseph Redmon	Rep
28	Jared Bauman	Rep	Almaria Baker	Dem
29	Chris Lewis	Rep	Cassie Blausey	Dem
30	Daniel Grossberg	Dem	Mitra Subedi	Dem
31	Susan Witten	Rep	Tim Hall	Dem
32	Tina Bojanowski	Dem	Tina Bojanowski	Dem
33	Jason Nemes	Rep	Jennifer Hardin	Dem
34	Sarah Stalker	Dem	Sarah Stalker	Dem
35	Lisa Willner	Dem	Lisa Willner	Dem
36	John Hodgson	Rep	John Hodgson	Rep
37	Emily Callaway	Rep	Emily Callaway	Rep
38	Rachel Roarx	Dem	Rachel Roarx	Dem
39	Matt Lockett	Rep	Ryan Stanford	Dem
40	Nima Kulkarni	Dem	Nima Kulkarni	Dem
41	Mary Lou Marzian	Dem	Mary Lou Marzian	Dem
42	Joshua Watkins	Dem	Joshua Watkins	Dem
43	Pamela Stevenson†	Dem	Robert LeVertis Bell	Dem
44	Beverly Chester-Burton	Dem	Kenya Wade	Dem
45	Adam Moore	Dem	Adam Moore	Dem
46	Al Gentry	Dem	Al Gentry	Dem
47	Felicia Rabourn	Rep	Felicia Rabourn	Rep
48	Ken Fleming	Rep	Suhas Kulkarni	Dem
49	Thomas Huff	Rep	Thomas Huff	Rep
50	Candy Massaroni	Rep	Candy Massaroni	Rep
51	Michael Sarge Pollock	Rep	Michael Sarge Pollock	Rep
52	Ken Upchurch†	Rep	Kevin Jones	Rep
53	James Tipton	Rep	James Tipton	Rep
54	Daniel Elliott	Rep	Daniel Elliott	Rep
55	Kim King	Rep	Kim King	Rep
56	Daniel Fister	Rep	Daniel Fister	Rep
57	Erika Hancock	Dem	Erika Hancock	Dem
58	Jennifer Decker	Rep	Jennifer Decker	Rep
59	David W. Osborne	Rep	David W. Osborne	Rep
60	Marianne Proctor	Rep	Marianne Proctor	Rep
61	Savannah Maddox	Rep	Savannah Maddox	Rep
62	Tony Hampton	Rep	Tony Hampton	Rep
63	Kim Banta	Rep	Cole Cuzick	Rep
64	Kimberly Poore Moser	Rep	Kimberly Poore Moser	Rep
65	Stephanie Dietz	Rep	Aaron Currin	Dem
66	T. J. Roberts	Rep	T. J. Roberts	Rep
67	Matthew Lehman	Dem	Matthew Lehman	Dem
68	Mike Clines	Rep	Mike Clines	Rep
69	Steven Doan	Rep	Steven Doan	Rep
70	William Lawrence†	Rep	Mike Fisher	Rep
71	Josh Bray	Rep	Josh Bray	Rep
72	Matthew Koch	Rep	Matthew Koch	Rep
73	Ryan Dotson†	Rep	Daniel Konstantopoulos	Rep
74	David Hale†	Rep	David Charles	Rep
75	Lindsey Burke	Dem	Lindsey Burke	Dem
76	Anne Gay Donworth	Dem	Anne Gay Donworth	Dem
77	George Brown Jr.	Dem	George Brown Jr.	Dem
78	Mark Hart	Rep	Mark Hart	Rep
79	Chad Aull	Dem	Chad Aull	Dem
80	David Meade	Rep	David Meade	Rep
81	Deanna Gordon	Rep	Deanna Gordon	Rep
82	Nick Wilson	Rep	Nick Wilson	Rep
83	Josh Branscum	Rep	Josh Branscum	Rep
84	Chris Fugate	Rep	Chris Fugate	Rep
85	Shane Baker	Rep	Shane Baker	Rep
86	Tom Smith	Rep	Tom Smith	Rep
87	Adam Bowling	Rep	Adam Bowling	Rep
88	Vanessa Grossl	Rep	Vanessa Grossl	Rep
89	Timmy Truett	Rep	Timmy Truett	Rep
90	Derek Lewis	Rep	Derek Lewis	Rep
91	Bill Wesley†	Rep	Darrell Billings	Rep
92	John Blanton	Rep	John Blanton	Rep
93	Adrielle Camuel	Dem	Adrielle Camuel	Dem
94	Mitch Whitaker	Rep	Mitch Whitaker	Rep
95	Ashley Tackett Laferty†	Dem	Tanner Hesterberg	Rep
96	Patrick Flannery	Rep	Patrick Flannery	Rep
97	Bobby McCool	Rep	Bobby McCool	Rep
98	Aaron Thompson	Rep	Aaron Thompson	Rep
99	Richard White	Rep	Richard White	Rep
100	Scott Sharp	Rep	Scott Sharp	Rep

== Retirements ==
Retiring incumbents by district Democratic incumbent ran Democratic incumbent retired or lost renomination Republican incumbent ran Republican incumbent retired or lost renomination

A total of nine representatives (two Democrats and seven Republicans) retired, five of whom (two Democrats and three Republicans) ran for another office.

=== Democratic ===
1. 43rd: Pamela Stevenson (Louisville): retired to run for the United States Senate.
2. 95th: Ashley Tackett Laferty (Martin): retired to run for District Court Judge.

=== Republican ===
1. 14th: Scott Lewis (Hartford): retired.
2. 27th: Nancy Tate (Brandenburg): retired.
3. 52nd: Ken Upchurch (Monticello): retired.
4. 70th: William Lawrence (Maysville): retired to run for Mason County Commissioner.
5. 73rd: Ryan Dotson (Winchester): retired to run for Kentucky's 6th congressional district.
6. 74th: David Hale (Wellington): retired.
7. 91st: Bill Wesley (Ravenna): retired to run for Kentucky's 30th Senate district.

== Incumbents defeated ==
Three incumbents lost renomination in the primary election, and seven incumbents lost reelection in the general election.

=== In the primary election ===
==== Democrats ====
Two Democrats lost renomination.

1. 30th: Daniel Grossberg (first elected in 2022) lost renomination to Mitra Subedi, who won the general election.
2. 44th: Beverly Chester-Burton (first elected in 2022) lost renomination to Kenya Wade, who won the general election.

==== Republicans ====
One Republican lost renomination.

1. 63rd: Kim Banta (first elected in 2019) lost renomination to Cole Cuzick, who won the general election.

=== In the general election ===
==== Democrats ====
None.

==== Republicans ====
Seven Republicans lost reelection.

1. 28th: Jared Bauman (first elected in 2022) lost to Almaria Baker.
2. 29th: Chris Lewis (first elected in 2024) lost to Cassie Blausey.
3. 31st: Susan Witten (first elected in 2022) lost to Tim Hall.
4. 33rd: Jason Nemes (first elected in 2016) lost to Jennifer Hardin.
5. 39th: Matt Lockett (first elected in 2020) lost to Ryan Stanford.
6. 48th: Ken Fleming (first elected in 2016, and then reelected in 2020 after losing in 2018) lost to Suhas Kulkarni.
7. 65th: Stephanie Dietz (first elected in 2022) lost to Aaron Currin.

== Crossover seats ==
This is a list of seats that voted for one party in the 2024 presidential election and another in the 2024 house election.

=== Democratic ===
This lists the districts which Donald Trump won in 2024 that are represented by Democrats:

District		Incumbent				
#	Trump margin of victory in 2024	Member	Party	First elected	Incumbent margin of victory in 2024	Result
38	R+1.40	Rachel Roarx	Democratic	2022	D+1.44	Roarx
45	R+4.05	Adam Moore	Democratic	2024	D+0.66	Moore
57	R+1.96	Erika Hancock	Democratic	2024	D+10.82	Hancock
67	R+2.66	Matthew Lehman	Democratic	2024	D+0.16	Lehman
95	R+57.65	Ashley Tackett Laferty (retiring)	Democratic	2018	D+12.55	Hesterberg (flip)

=== Republican ===
This lists the districts which Kamala Harris won in 2024 that are represented by Republicans:

District		Incumbent				
#	Harris margin of victory in 2024	Member	Party	First elected	Incumbent margin of victory in 2024	Result
31	D+3.23	Susan Witten	Republican	2022	R+1.43	Tim Hall (flip)
48	D+2.33	Ken Fleming	Republican	2016; 2018 (lost); 2020	R+7.48	Suhas Kulkarni (flip)

== Closest races ==
Twelve races were decided by 10% or lower.

District	Winner	Margin
36th	Republican	0.48%
39th	Democratic (flip)	1.40%
56th	Republican	2.71%
33rd	Democratic (flip)	2.78%
48th	Democratic (flip)	3.67%
69th	Republican	4.02%
29th	Democratic (flip)	5.20%
88th	Republican	5.33%
65th	Democratic (flip)	6.10%
28th	Democratic (flip)	7.38%
45th	Democratic	8.38%
73rd	Republican	8.80%

== Predictions ==
Source	Ranking	As of
Sabato's Crystal Ball	Safe R	January 22, 2026
State Navigate	Safe R	October 21, 2026

== District 1 ==
=== Republican primary ===
==== Candidates ====
- Steven Rudy, incumbent representative

=== General election ===
==== Results ====
2026 Kentucky's 1st House of Representatives district election
Party	Candidate	Votes	%
Republican	Steven Jack Rudy (incumbent)	Unopposed	
Total votes		10,897	100.0
Republican hold			

== District 2 ==
=== Republican primary ===
==== Candidates ====
===== Nominee =====
- Kim Holloway, incumbent representative

===== Eliminated in primary =====
- Nate Cox
- Richard Heath, representative from the 2nd district (2012–2025)

==== Results ====
Republican primary results
Party	Candidate	Votes	%
Republican	Kim Holloway (incumbent)	3,026	56.8
Republican	Richard Heath	1,740	32.6
Republican	Nate Cox	566	10.6
Total votes		5,332	100.0

=== General election ===
==== Results ====
2026 Kentucky's 2nd House of Representatives district election
Party	Candidate	Votes	%
Republican	Kim Holloway (incumbent)	Unopposed	
Total votes		10,435	100.0
Republican hold			

== District 3 ==
=== Republican primary ===
==== Candidates ====
- Randy Bridges, incumbent representative

=== Democratic primary ===
==== Candidates ====
- Michael McVicker

=== General election ===
==== Results ====
2026 Kentucky's 3rd House of Representatives district election
Party	Candidate	Votes	%
Republican	Randy Bridges (incumbent)	8,396	61.31
Democratic	Michael McVicker	5,299	38.69
Total votes		13,695	100.0
Republican hold			

== District 4 ==
=== Republican primary ===
==== Candidates ====
- Wade Williams, incumbent representative

=== General election ===
==== Results ====
2026 Kentucky's 4th House of Representatives district election
Party	Candidate	Votes	%
Republican	D. Wade Williams (incumbent)	Unopposed	
Total votes		10,304	100.0
Republican hold			

== District 5 ==
=== Republican primary ===
==== Candidates ====
- Mary Beth Imes, incumbent representative

=== General election ===
==== Results ====
2026 Kentucky's 5th House of Representatives district election
Party	Candidate	Votes	%
Republican	Mary Beth Imes (incumbent)	Unopposed	
Total votes		10,004	100.0
Republican hold			

== District 6 ==
=== Republican primary ===
==== Candidates ====
- Chris Freeland, incumbent representative

=== General election ===
==== Results ====
2026 Kentucky's 6th House of Representatives district election
Party	Candidate	Votes	%
Republican	Chris Freeland (incumbent)	Unopposed	
Total votes		12,453	100.0
Republican hold			

== District 7 ==
=== Republican primary ===
==== Candidates ====
- Suzanne Miles, incumbent representative

=== Democratic primary ===
==== Candidates ====
- Laurie C. Campbell

=== General election ===
==== Results ====
2026 Kentucky's 7th House of Representatives district election
Party	Candidate	Votes	%
Republican	Suzanne Miles (incumbent)	8,174	55.61
Democratic	Laurie C. Campbell	6,526	44.39
Total votes		14,700	100.0
Republican hold			

== District 8 ==
=== Republican primary ===
==== Candidates ====
- Walker Thomas, incumbent representative

=== General election ===
==== Results ====
2026 Kentucky's 8th House of Representatives district election
Party	Candidate	Votes	%
Republican	Walker Wood Thomas (incumbent)	Unopposed	
Total votes		9,030	100.0
Republican hold			

== District 9 ==
=== Republican primary ===
==== Candidates ====
- Myron Dossett, incumbent representative

=== General election ===
==== Results ====
2026 Kentucky's 9th House of Representatives district election
Party	Candidate	Votes	%
Republican	Myron B. Dossett (incumbent)	Unopposed	
Total votes		4,578	100.0
Republican hold			

== District 10 ==
=== Republican primary ===
==== Candidates ====
===== Nominee =====
- Josh Calloway, incumbent representative

===== Eliminated in primary =====
- Julie Cantwell, candidate for this district in 2024

==== Results ====
Republican primary results
Party	Candidate	Votes	%
Republican	Josh Calloway (incumbent)	4,315	64.7
Republican	Julie Cantwell	2,353	35.3
Total votes		6,668	100.0

=== Democratic primary ===
==== Candidates ====
- John B. Whipple, candidate for this district in 2024

=== General election ===
==== Results ====
2026 Kentucky's 10th House of Representatives district election
Party	Candidate	Votes	%
Republican	Josh Calloway (incumbent)	9,402	60.06
Democratic	John B. Whipple	6,252	39.94
Total votes		15,654	100.0
Republican hold			

== District 11 ==
=== Republican primary ===
==== Candidates ====
- J. T. Payne, incumbent representative

=== Democratic primary ===
==== Candidates ====
- Janelle Rowena Glass

=== General election ===
==== Results ====
2026 Kentucky's 11th House of Representatives district election
Party	Candidate	Votes	%
Republican	J. T. Payne (incumbent)	8,449	62.74
Democratic	Janelle Rowena Glass	5,018	37.26
Total votes		13,467	100.0
Republican hold			

== District 12 ==
=== Republican primary ===
==== Candidates ====
- Jim Gooch Jr., incumbent representative

=== General election ===
==== Results ====
2026 Kentucky's 12th House of Representatives district election
Party	Candidate	Votes	%
Republican	Jim Gooch Jr. (incumbent)	Unopposed	
Total votes		10,628	100.0
Republican hold			

== District 13 ==
=== Republican primary ===
==== Candidates ====
- DJ Johnson, incumbent representative

=== Democratic primary ===
==== Candidates ====
- Rhondalyn Randolph

=== General election ===
==== Results ====
2026 Kentucky's 13th House of Representatives district election
Party	Candidate	Votes	%
Republican	DJ Johnson (incumbent)	7,083	55.29
Democratic	Rhondalyn Randolph	5,728	44.71
Total votes		12,811	100.0
Republican hold			

== District 14 ==
=== Republican primary ===
==== Candidates ====
===== Nominee =====
- Wes Pate, nurse and member of the Lewisport City Council (2015–2023)

===== Eliminated in primary =====
- Marty Shephard

==== Results ====
Republican primary results
Party	Candidate	Votes	%
Republican	Wes Pate	3,853	57.6
Republican	Marty Shephard	2,832	42.4
Total votes		6,685	100.0

=== Democratic primary ===
==== Candidates ====
- Donna Haynes

=== General election ===
==== Results ====
2026 Kentucky's 14th House of Representatives district election
Party	Candidate	Votes	%
Republican	Wes Pate	10,236	72.90
Democratic	Donna Haynes	3,806	27.10
Total votes		14,042	100.0
Republican hold			

== District 15 ==
=== Republican primary ===
==== Candidates ====
- Rebecca Raymer, incumbent representative

=== Democratic primary ===
==== Candidates ====
- Chris Waddell

=== General election ===
==== Results ====
2026 Kentucky's 15th House of Representatives district election
Party	Candidate	Votes	%
Republican	Rebecca Raymer (incumbent)	9,514	73.48
Democratic	Chris Waddell	3,433	26.52
Total votes		12,947	100.0
Republican hold			

== District 16 ==
=== Republican primary ===
==== Candidates ====
- Jason Petrie, incumbent representative

=== General election ===
==== Results ====
2026 Kentucky's 16th House of Representatives district election
Party	Candidate	Votes	%
Republican	Jason Petrie (incumbent)	Unopposed	
Total votes		10,085	100.0
Republican hold			

== District 17 ==
=== Republican primary ===
==== Candidates ====
- Robert Duvall, incumbent representative

=== General election ===
==== Results ====
2026 Kentucky's 17th House of Representatives district election
Party	Candidate	Votes	%
Republican	Robert B. Duvall (incumbent)	Unopposed	
Total votes		8,307	100.0
Republican hold			

== District 18 ==
=== Republican primary ===
==== Candidates ====
- Samara Heavrin, incumbent representative

=== General election ===
==== Results ====
2026 Kentucky's 18th House of Representatives district election
Party	Candidate	Votes	%
Republican	Samara Heavrin (incumbent)	Unopposed	
Total votes		10,288	100.0
Republican hold			

== District 19 ==
=== Republican primary ===
==== Candidates ====
- Michael Meredith, incumbent representative

=== General election ===
==== Results ====
2026 Kentucky's 19th House of Representatives district election
Party	Candidate	Votes	%
Republican	Michael Lee Meredith (incumbent)	Unopposed	
Total votes		10,014	100.0
Republican hold			

== District 20 ==
=== Republican primary ===
==== Candidates ====
- Kevin Jackson, incumbent representative

=== General election ===
==== Results ====
2026 Kentucky's 20th House of Representatives district election
Party	Candidate	Votes	%
Republican	Kevin Jackson (incumbent)	Unopposed	
Total votes		7,079	100.0
Republican hold			

== District 21 ==
=== Republican primary ===
==== Candidates ====
- Amy Neighbors, incumbent representative

=== General election ===
==== Results ====
2026 Kentucky's 21st House of Representatives district election
Party	Candidate	Votes	%
Republican	Amy Neighbors (incumbent)	Unopposed	
Total votes		12,044	100.0
Republican hold			

== District 22 ==
=== Republican primary ===
==== Candidates ====
- Shawn McPherson, incumbent representative

=== General election ===
==== Results ====
2026 Kentucky's 22nd House of Representatives district election
Party	Candidate	Votes	%
Republican	Shawn McPherson (incumbent)	Unopposed	
Total votes		9,830	100.0
Republican hold			

== District 23 ==
=== Republican primary ===
==== Candidates ====
- Steve Riley, incumbent representative

=== General election ===
==== Results ====
2026 Kentucky's 23rd House of Representatives district election
Party	Candidate	Votes	%
Republican	Steve Riley (incumbent)	Unopposed	
Total votes		9,234	100.0
Republican hold			

== District 24 ==
=== Republican primary ===
==== Candidates ====
===== Nominee =====
- Ryan Bivens, incumbent representative

===== Eliminated in primary =====
- Steven T. Caven

==== Results ====
Republican primary results
Party	Candidate	Votes	%
Republican	Ryan Dale Bivens (incumbent)	4,478	65.3
Republican	Steven T. Caven	2,384	34.7
Total votes		6,862	100.0

=== Democratic primary ===
==== Candidates ====
- Johnny Pennington, perennial candidate

=== General election ===
==== Results ====
2026 Kentucky's 24th House of Representatives district election
Party	Candidate	Votes	%
Republican	Ryan Dale Bivens (incumbent)	10,284	75.48
Democratic	Johnny Pennington	3,341	24.52
Total votes		13,625	100.0
Republican hold			

== District 25 ==
=== Republican primary ===
==== Candidates ====
- Steve Bratcher, incumbent representative

=== Democratic primary ===
==== Candidates ====
- Cherlyn Evette Smith, candidate for this district in 2024

=== General election ===
==== Results ====
2026 Kentucky's 25th House of Representatives district election
Party	Candidate	Votes	%
Republican	Steve Bratcher (incumbent)	7,259	55.31
Democratic	Cherlyn Evette Smith	5,866	44.69
Total votes		13,125	100.0
Republican hold			

== District 26 ==
=== Republican primary ===
==== Candidates ====
- Peyton Griffee, incumbent representative

=== General election ===
==== Results ====
2026 Kentucky's 26th House of Representatives district election
Party	Candidate	Votes	%
Republican	Peyton Griffee (incumbent)	Unopposed	
Total votes		8,430	100.0
Republican hold			

== District 27 ==
=== Republican primary ===
==== Candidates ====
===== Nominee =====
- Joseph Redmon

===== Eliminated in primary =====
- Sandra Carter
- Rachelle Frazier, candidate for this district in 2014, 2016, and 2018
- Paul Smith

==== Results ====
Republican primary results
Party	Candidate	Votes	%
Republican	Joseph Redmon	1,558	43.0
Republican	Rachelle Frazier	1,054	29.1
Republican	Paul Smith	570	15.7
Republican	Sandra Carter	443	12.2
Total votes		3,625	100.0

=== Democratic primary ===
==== Candidates ====
- Susan C. Doman

=== General election ===
==== Results ====
2026 Kentucky's 27th House of Representatives district election
Party	Candidate	Votes	%
Republican	Joseph Redmon	6,898	56.37
Democratic	Susan C. Doman	5,338	43.63
Total votes		12,236	100.0
Republican hold			

== District 28 ==
=== Republican primary ===
==== Candidates ====
- Jared Bauman, incumbent representative

=== Democratic primary ===
==== Candidates ====
- Almaria Baker, candidate for this district in 2022 and 2024

=== General election ===
==== Results ====
2026 Kentucky's 28th House of Representatives district election
Party	Candidate	Votes	%
Democratic	Almaria Baker	7,090	53.69
Republican	Jared A. Bauman (incumbent)	6,116	46.31
Total votes		13,206	100.0
Democratic gain from Republican			

== District 29 ==
=== Republican primary ===
==== Candidates ====
- Chris Lewis, incumbent representative

=== Democratic primary ===
==== Candidates ====
- Cassie Blausey

=== General election ===
==== Results ====
2026 Kentucky's 29th House of Representatives district election
Party	Candidate	Votes	%
Democratic	Cassie Blausey	9,596	52.60
Republican	Chris Lewis (incumbent)	8,647	47.40
Total votes		18,243	100.0
Democratic gain from Republican			

== District 30 ==
=== Democratic primary ===
==== Candidates ====
===== Nominee =====
- Mitra Subedi, high school teacher and candidate for this district in 2024

===== Eliminated in primary =====
- Daniel Grossberg, incumbent representative
- Cassie Lyles, high school teacher

===== Withdrawn =====
- Max Morley

==== Results ====
Results by precinct: Subedi: 30–40%; 40–50%; 50–60%; 60–70%; 70–80%; Lyles: 30–40%; 40–50%; 50–60%; Grossberg: 30–40%

Democratic primary results
Party	Candidate	Votes	%
Democratic	Mitra Subedi	2,095	44.7
Democratic	Cassie Lyles	1,495	31.9
Democratic	Daniel Grossberg (incumbent)	1,096	23.4
Total votes		4,686	100.0

=== General election ===
==== Results ====
2026 Kentucky's 30th House of Representatives district election
Party	Candidate	Votes	%
Democratic	Mitra Subedi	Unopposed	
Total votes		8,234	100.0
Democratic hold			

== District 31 ==
=== Republican primary ===
==== Candidates ====
- Susan Witten, incumbent representative

=== Democratic primary ===
==== Candidates ====
- Tim Hall

=== General election ===
==== Results ====
2026 Kentucky's 31st House of Representatives district election
Party	Candidate	Votes	%
Democratic	Tim Hall	10,375	57.01
Republican	Susan Tyler Witten (incumbent)	7,825	42.99
Total votes		18,200	100.0
Democratic gain from Republican			

== District 32 ==
=== Democratic primary ===
==== Candidates ====
- Tina Bojanowski, incumbent representative

=== General election ===
==== Results ====
2026 Kentucky's 32nd House of Representatives district election
Party	Candidate	Votes	%
Democratic	Tina Bojanowski (incumbent)	Unopposed	
Total votes		13,739	100.0
Democratic hold			

== District 33 ==
=== Republican primary ===
==== Candidates ====
- Jason Nemes, incumbent representative

=== Democratic primary ===
==== Candidates ====
===== Nominee =====
- Jennifer Hardin

===== Eliminated in primary =====
- Tarah Combs LeBlanc

==== Results ====
Democratic primary results
Party	Candidate	Votes	%
Democratic	Jennifer Hardin	2,930	65.5
Democratic	Tarah Combs LeBlanc	1,544	34.5
Total votes		4,474	100.0

=== General election ===
==== Results ====
2026 Kentucky's 33rd House of Representatives district election
Party	Candidate	Votes	%
Democratic	Jennifer Hardin	9,857	51.39
Republican	Jason Michael Nemes (incumbent)	9,323	48.61
Total votes		19,180	100.0
Democratic gain from Republican			

== District 34 ==
=== Democratic primary ===
==== Candidates ====
- Sarah Stalker, incumbent representative

=== Republican primary ===
==== Candidates ====
- Victoria Ligon

=== General election ===
==== Results ====
2026 Kentucky's 34th House of Representatives district election
Party	Candidate	Votes	%
Democratic	Sarah Stalker (incumbent)	15,782	73.54
Republican	Victoria Ligon	5,678	26.46
Total votes		21,460	100.0
Democratic hold			

== District 35 ==
=== Democratic primary ===
==== Candidates ====
- Lisa Willner, incumbent representative

=== Republican primary ===
==== Candidates ====
===== Nominee =====
- Bret Shultz

===== Eliminated in primary =====
- Charles Jungbert

==== Results ====
Republican primary results
Party	Candidate	Votes	%
Republican	Bret Shultz	931	73.1
Republican	Charles Jungbert	342	26.9
Total votes		1,273	100.0

=== General election ===
==== Results ====
2026 Kentucky's 35th House of Representatives district election
Party	Candidate	Votes	%
Democratic	Lisa Willner (incumbent)	6,359	66.48
Republican	Bret Shultz	3,206	33.52
Total votes		9,565	100.0
Democratic hold			

== District 36 ==
=== Republican primary ===
==== Candidates ====
===== Nominee =====
- John Hodgson, incumbent representative

===== Eliminated in primary =====
- Rex Toler

==== Results ====
Republican primary results
Party	Candidate	Votes	%
Republican	John F. Hodgson (incumbent)	3,576	81.4
Republican	Rex Toler	815	18.6
Total votes		4,391	100.0

=== Democratic primary ===
==== Candidates ====
- William "Woody" Zorn, candidate for this district in 2024

=== General election ===
==== Results ====
2026 Kentucky's 36th House of Representatives district election
Party	Candidate	Votes	%
Republican	John F. Hodgson (incumbent)	10,389	50.24
Democratic	William "Woody" Zorn	10,289	49.76
Total votes		20,678	100.0
Republican hold			

== District 37 ==
=== Republican primary ===
==== Candidates ====
- Emily Callaway, incumbent representative

=== General election ===
==== Results ====
2026 Kentucky's 37th House of Representatives district election
Party	Candidate	Votes	%
Republican	Emily Myers Callaway (incumbent)	Unopposed	
Total votes		7,622	100.0
Republican hold			

== District 38 ==
=== Democratic primary ===
==== Candidates ====
- Rachel Roarx, incumbent representative

=== Republican primary ===
==== Candidates ====
- Carrie Sanders McKeehan, candidate for this district in 2024 and the 41st district in 2022

=== General election ===
==== Results ====
2026 Kentucky's 38th House of Representatives district election
Party	Candidate	Votes	%
Democratic	Rachel Roarx (incumbent)	7,474	61.44
Republican	Carrie Sanders McKeehan	4,690	38.56
Total votes		12,164	100.0
Democratic hold			

== District 39 ==
=== Republican primary ===
==== Candidates ====
- Matt Lockett, incumbent representative

=== Democratic primary ===
==== Candidates ====
- Ryan Stanford, candidate for this district in 2024

=== General election ===
==== Endorsements ====
Ryan Stanford

Organizations

- Vote Common Good

==== Results ====
2026 Kentucky's 39th House of Representatives district election
Party	Candidate	Votes	%
Democratic	Ryan Stanford	7,846	50.70
Republican	Matt Lockett (incumbent)	7,630	49.30
Total votes		15,476	100.0
Democratic gain from Republican			

== District 40 ==
=== Democratic primary ===
==== Candidates ====
===== Nominee =====
- Nima Kulkarni, incumbent representative

===== Eliminated in primary =====
- Patrick Bryant Dunegan

==== Results ====
Results by precinct: Kulkarni: 50–60%; 60–70%; 70–80%; 80–90%; >90%

Democratic primary results
Party	Candidate	Votes	%
Democratic	Nima Kulkarni (incumbent)	3,271	77.4
Democratic	Patrick Bryant Dunegan	954	22.6
Total votes		4,225	100.0

=== General election ===
==== Results ====
2026 Kentucky's 40th House of Representatives district election
Party	Candidate	Votes	%
Democratic	Nima Kulkarni (incumbent)	Unopposed	
Total votes		8,047	100.0
Democratic hold			

== District 41 ==
=== Democratic primary ===
==== Candidates ====
- Mary Lou Marzian, incumbent representative

=== General election ===
==== Results ====
2026 Kentucky's 41st House of Representatives district election
Party	Candidate	Votes	%
Democratic	Mary Lou Marzian (incumbent)	Unopposed	
Total votes		17,335	100.0
Democratic hold			

== District 42 ==
=== Democratic primary ===
==== Candidates ====
- Joshua Watkins, incumbent representative

=== General election ===
==== Results ====
2026 Kentucky's 42nd House of Representatives district election
Party	Candidate	Votes	%
Democratic	Joshua Watkins (incumbent)	Unopposed	
Total votes		10,076	100.0
Democratic hold			

== District 43 ==
=== Democratic primary ===
==== Candidates ====
===== Nominee =====
- Robert LeVertis Bell, public school teacher, candidate for this district in 2022, and candidate for the Louisville Metro Council in 2020

===== Eliminated in primary =====
- Joi McAtee

==== Endorsements ====
Robert LeVertis Bell

U.S. senators

- Bernie Sanders, Vermont (2007–present) (Independent)

Organizations

- Louisville Democratic Socialists of America

==== Results ====
Results by precinct: Bell: 50–60%; 60–70%; 70–80%; 80–90%; McAtee: 50–60%; 70–80%; Tie: 50%

Democratic primary results
Party	Candidate	Votes	%
Democratic	Robert LeVertis Bell	2,938	54.6
Democratic	Joi McAtee	2,447	45.4
Total votes		5,385	100.0

=== Write-in candidates ===
- Lisa Harris, candidate for mayor of Louisville in 2026

=== General election ===
==== Results ====
2026 Kentucky's 43rd House of Representatives district election
Party	Candidate	Votes	%
Democratic	Robert LeVertis Bell	9,472	99.24
Write-in	Lisa Harris	73	0.76
Total votes		9,545	100.0
Democratic hold			

== District 44 ==
=== Democratic primary ===
==== Candidates ====
===== Nominee =====
- Kenya Wade

===== Eliminated in primary =====
- Beverly Chester-Burton, incumbent representative
- Jesten S. Slaw

==== Results ====
Results by precinct: Wade: 40–50%; 50–60%; Chester-Burton: 30–40%; 40–50%; 50–60%; 60–70%; Tie: 40–50%

Democratic primary results
Party	Candidate	Votes	%
Democratic	Kenya Wade	2,465	43.7
Democratic	Beverly Chester-Burton (incumbent)	2,460	43.6
Democratic	Jesten S. Slaw	711	12.6
Total votes		5,636	100.0

=== General election ===
==== Results ====
2026 Kentucky's 44th House of Representatives district election
Party	Candidate	Votes	%
Democratic	Kenya Wade	Unopposed	
Total votes		10,107	100.0
Democratic hold			

== District 45 ==
=== Democratic primary ===
==== Candidates ====
- Adam Moore, incumbent representative

=== Republican primary ===
==== Candidates ====
===== Nominee =====
- Killian Timoney, representative from the 45th district (2021–2025)

===== Withdrawn =====
- Jeff Thompson, member of the Idaho House of Representatives (2008–2018)

=== General election ===
==== Results ====
2026 Kentucky's 45th House of Representatives district election
Party	Candidate	Votes	%
Democratic	Adam Moore (incumbent)	11,185	54.19
Republican	Killian Timoney	9,455	45.81
Total votes		20,640	100.0
Democratic hold			

== District 46 ==
=== Democratic primary ===
==== Candidates ====
- Al Gentry, incumbent representative

=== Republican primary ===
==== Candidates ====
- Brad Woolridge

=== General election ===
==== Results ====
2026 Kentucky's 46th House of Representatives district election
Party	Candidate	Votes	%
Democratic	Al Gentry (incumbent)	10,156	65.56
Republican	Brad Woolridge	5,336	34.44
Total votes		15,492	100.0
Democratic hold			

== District 47 ==
=== Republican primary ===
==== Candidates ====
===== Nominee =====
- Felicia Rabourn, incumbent representative

===== Eliminated in primary =====
- Mark A. Gilkison, businessman and candidate for this district in 2018 and 2024

==== Results ====
Republican primary results
Party	Candidate	Votes	%
Republican	Felicia Rabourn (incumbent)	3,707	58.0
Republican	Mark A. Gilkison	2,679	42.0
Total votes		6,386	100.0

=== General election ===
==== Results ====
2026 Kentucky's 47th House of Representatives district election
Party	Candidate	Votes	%
Republican	Felicia Rabourn (incumbent)	Unopposed	
Total votes		11,325	100.0
Republican hold			

== District 48 ==
=== Republican primary ===
==== Candidates ====
- Ken Fleming, incumbent representative

=== Democratic primary ===
==== Candidates ====
===== Nominee =====
- Suhas Kulkarni, business owner and father of state representative Nima Kulkarni

===== Eliminated in primary =====
- Nathan Bellows

==== Results ====
Democratic primary results
Party	Candidate	Votes	%
Democratic	Suhas Kulkarni	4,170	72.1
Democratic	Nathan Bellows	1,613	27.9
Total votes		5,783	100.0

=== General election ===
==== Results ====
2026 Kentucky's 48th House of Representatives district election
Party	Candidate	Votes	%
Democratic	Suhas Kulkarni	11,446	51.84
Republican	Ken Fleming (incumbent)	10,635	48.16
Total votes		22,081	100.0
Democratic gain from Republican			

== District 49 ==
=== Republican primary ===
==== Candidates ====
- Thomas Huff, incumbent representative

=== General election ===
==== Results ====
2026 Kentucky's 49th House of Representatives district election
Party	Candidate	Votes	%
Republican	Thomas Huff (incumbent)	Unopposed	
Total votes		11,060	100.0
Republican hold			

== District 50 ==
=== Republican primary ===
==== Candidates ====
- Candy Massaroni, incumbent representative

=== Democratic primary ===
==== Candidates ====
- J. D. Netherton

=== General election ===
==== Results ====
2026 Kentucky's 50th House of Representatives district election
Party	Candidate	Votes	%
Republican	Candy Massaroni (incumbent)	10,513	65.79
Democratic	J. D. Netherton	5,466	34.21
Total votes		15,979	100.0
Republican hold			

== District 51 ==
=== Republican primary ===
==== Candidates ====
- Michael Sarge Pollock, incumbent representative

=== General election ===
==== Results ====
2026 Kentucky's 51st House of Representatives district election
Party	Candidate	Votes	%
Republican	Michael "Sarge" Pollock (incumbent)	Unopposed	
Total votes		10,905	100.0
Republican hold			

== District 52 ==
=== Republican primary ===
==== Candidates ====
===== Nominee =====
- Kevin G. Jones

===== Eliminated in primary =====
- Michael Jonah Neal

==== Results ====
Republican primary results
Party	Candidate	Votes	%
Republican	Kevin G. Jones	5,429	65.0
Republican	Michael Jonah Neal	2,922	35.0
Total votes		8,351	100.0

=== General election ===
==== Results ====
2026 Kentucky's 52nd House of Representatives district election
Party	Candidate	Votes	%
Republican	Kevin G. Jones	Unopposed	
Total votes		10,180	100.0
Republican hold			

== District 53 ==
=== Republican primary ===
==== Candidates ====
- James Tipton, incumbent representative

=== General election ===
==== Results ====
2026 Kentucky's 53rd House of Representatives district election
Party	Candidate	Votes	%
Republican	James Allen Tipton (incumbent)	Unopposed	
Total votes		12,723	100.0
Republican hold			

== District 54 ==
=== Republican primary ===
==== Candidates ====
- Daniel Elliott, incumbent representative

=== General election ===
==== Results ====
2026 Kentucky's 54th House of Representatives district election
Party	Candidate	Votes	%
Republican	Daniel B. Elliott (incumbent)	Unopposed	
Total votes		10,543	100.0
Republican hold			

== District 55 ==
=== Republican primary ===
==== Candidates ====
- Kim King, incumbent representative

=== Democratic primary ===
==== Candidates ====
===== Nominee =====
- Katrina A. Sexton, member of the Burgin Board of Education (2019–present) and the Burgin city council (2009–2011, 2017–2019) and candidate for this district in 2024

===== Eliminated in primary =====
- Nathan Saucedo

==== Results ====
Democratic primary results
Party	Candidate	Votes	%
Democratic	Katrina A. Sexton	1,831	57.6
Democratic	Nathan Saucedo	1,347	42.4
Total votes		3,178	100.0

=== General election ===
==== Results ====
2026 Kentucky's 55th House of Representatives district election
Party	Candidate	Votes	%
Republican	Kim King (incumbent)	9,397	58.48
Democratic	Katrina A. Sexton	6,673	41.52
Total votes		16,070	100.0
Republican hold			

== District 56 ==
=== Republican primary ===
==== Candidates ====
- Daniel Fister, incumbent representative

=== Democratic primary ===
==== Candidates ====
- David Graves

=== General election ===
==== Results ====
2026 Kentucky's 56th House of Representatives district election
Party	Candidate	Votes	%
Republican	Daniel A. Fister (incumbent)	9,816	51.36
Democratic	David Graves	9,298	48.64
Total votes		19,114	100.0
Republican hold			

== District 57 ==
=== Democratic primary ===
==== Candidates ====
- Erika Hancock, incumbent representative

=== General election ===
==== Results ====
2026 Kentucky's 57th House of Representatives district election
Party	Candidate	Votes	%
Democratic	Erika Hancock (incumbent)	Unopposed	
Total votes		11,653	100.0
Democratic hold			

== District 58 ==
=== Republican primary ===
==== Candidates ====
- Jennifer Decker, incumbent representative

=== Democratic primary ===
==== Candidates ====
- Andrew Thomas Monarch

=== General election ===
==== Results ====
2026 Kentucky's 58th House of Representatives district election
Party	Candidate	Votes	%
Republican	Jennifer Henson Decker (incumbent)	10,451	61.65
Democratic	Andrew Thomas Monarch	6,501	38.35
Total votes		16,952	100.0
Republican hold			

== District 59 ==
=== Republican primary ===
==== Candidates ====
- David W. Osborne, incumbent representative

=== Democratic primary ===
==== Candidates ====
===== Nominee =====
- Stephanie White

===== Eliminated in primary =====
- Pandora Sears

==== Results ====
Democratic primary results
Party	Candidate	Votes	%
Democratic	Stephanie White	2,635	80.5
Democratic	Pandora Sears	637	19.5
Total votes		3,272	100.0

=== General election ===
==== Results ====
2026 Kentucky's 59th House of Representatives district election
Party	Candidate	Votes	%
Republican	David W. Osborne (incumbent)	10,646	56.75
Democratic	Stephanie White	8,114	43.25
Total votes		18,760	100.0
Republican hold			

== District 60 ==
=== Republican primary ===
==== Candidates ====
- Marianne Proctor, incumbent representative

=== Democratic primary ===
==== Candidates ====
- Tracey Reid

=== General election ===
==== Results ====
2026 Kentucky's 60th House of Representatives district election
Party	Candidate	Votes	%
Republican	Marianne Proctor (incumbent)	9,884	60.15
Democratic	Tracey Reid	6,548	39.85
Total votes		16,432	100.0
Republican hold			

== District 61 ==
=== Republican primary ===
==== Candidates ====
- Savannah Maddox, incumbent representative

=== General election ===
==== Results ====
2026 Kentucky's 61st House of Representatives district election
Party	Candidate	Votes	%
Republican	Savannah Maddox (incumbent)	Unopposed	
Total votes		10,385	100.0
Republican hold			

== District 62 ==
=== Republican primary ===
==== Candidates ====
- Tony Hampton, incumbent representative

=== Democratic primary ===
==== Candidates ====
- Randy Jackson Simpkins

=== General election ===
==== Results ====
2026 Kentucky's 62nd House of Representatives district election
Party	Candidate	Votes	%
Republican	Tony Hampton (incumbent)	9,489	58.77
Democratic	Randy Jackson Simpkins	6,657	41.23
Total votes		16,146	100.0
Republican hold			

== District 63 ==
=== Republican primary ===
==== Candidates ====
===== Nominee =====
- Cole Cuzick

===== Eliminated in primary =====
- Kim Banta, incumbent representative
- Seth Winslow Young

==== Results ====
Republican primary results
Party	Candidate	Votes	%
Republican	Cole Cuzick	2,220	45.7
Republican	Kim Banta (incumbent)	2,207	45.4
Republican	Seth Winslow Young	435	8.9
Total votes		4,862	100.0

=== General election ===
==== Results ====
2026 Kentucky's 63rd House of Representatives district election
Party	Candidate	Votes	%
Republican	Cole Cuzick	Unopposed	
Total votes		8,518	100.0
Republican hold			

== District 64 ==
=== Republican primary ===
==== Candidates ====
===== Nominee =====
- Kimberly Poore Moser, incumbent representative

===== Eliminated in primary =====
- Scott Berger

==== Results ====
Republican primary results
Party	Candidate	Votes	%
Republican	Kimberly Poore Moser (incumbent)	2,835	53.5
Republican	Scott Berger	2,469	46.5
Total votes		5,304	100.0

=== Democratic primary ===
==== Candidates ====
===== Nominee =====
- William Nick Whalen

===== Eliminated in primary =====
- Nicholas C. McHargue

==== Results ====
Democratic primary results
Party	Candidate	Votes	%
Democratic	William Nick Whalen	1,400	63.9
Democratic	Nicholas C. McHargue	791	36.1
Total votes		2,191	100.0

=== General election ===
==== Results ====
2026 Kentucky's 64th House of Representatives district election
Party	Candidate	Votes	%
Republican	Kimberly Poore Moser (incumbent)	8,258	55.88
Democratic	William Nick Whalen	6,520	44.12
Total votes		14,778	100.0
Republican hold			

== District 65 ==
=== Republican primary ===
==== Candidates ====
- Stephanie Dietz, incumbent representative

=== Democratic primary ===
==== Candidates ====
- Aaron Currin, candidate for this district in 2024

=== General election ===
==== Results ====
2026 Kentucky's 65th House of Representatives district election
Party	Candidate	Votes	%
Democratic	Aaron John Currin	7,648	53.05
Republican	Stephanie A. Dietz (incumbent)	6,769	46.95
Total votes		14,417	100.0
Democratic gain from Republican			

== District 66 ==
=== Republican primary ===
==== Candidates ====
- T. J. Roberts, incumbent representative

=== Democratic primary ===
==== Candidates ====
- Jason Ellis

=== General election ===
==== Results ====
2026 Kentucky's 66th House of Representatives district election
Party	Candidate	Votes	%
Republican	T. J. Roberts (incumbent)	9,542	61.38
Democratic	Jason Ellis	6,004	38.62
Total votes		15,546	100.0
Republican hold			

== District 67 ==
=== Democratic primary ===
==== Candidates ====
- Matthew Lehman, incumbent representative

=== Republican primary ===
==== Candidates ====
- Terry Hatton, candidate for this district in 2024

=== General election ===
==== Results ====
2026 Kentucky's 67th House of Representatives district election
Party	Candidate	Votes	%
Democratic	Matthew Lehman (incumbent)	8,418	59.89
Republican	Terry Hatton	5,637	40.11
Total votes		14,055	100.0
Democratic hold			

== District 68 ==
=== Republican primary ===
==== Candidates ====
- Mike Clines, incumbent representative

=== Democratic primary ===
==== Candidates ====
- Amy Amin

=== General election ===
==== Results ====
2026 Kentucky's 68th House of Representatives district election
Party	Candidate	Votes	%
Republican	Mike Clines (incumbent)	10,538	57.77
Democratic	Amy Amin	7,702	42.23
Total votes		18,240	100.0
Republican hold			

== District 69 ==
=== Republican primary ===
==== Candidates ====
===== Nominee =====
- Steven Doan, incumbent representative

===== Eliminated in primary =====
- Jesse Foreman

==== Results ====
Republican primary results
Party	Candidate	Votes	%
Republican	Steven Doan (incumbent)	2,727	78.2
Republican	Jesse Foreman	758	21.8
Total votes		3,485	100.0

=== Democratic primary ===
==== Candidates ====
===== Nominee =====
- Wilanne Stangel, candidate for this district in 2024

===== Eliminated in primary =====
- Bryan G. Snapp

==== Results ====
Democratic primary results
Party	Candidate	Votes	%
Democratic	Wilanne Stangel	1,029	53.5
Democratic	Bryan G. Snapp	896	46.5
Total votes		1,925	100.0

=== General election ===
==== Results ====
2026 Kentucky's 69th House of Representatives district election
Party	Candidate	Votes	%
Republican	Steven Doan (incumbent)	6,046	52.01
Democratic	Wilanne Stangel	5,579	47.99
Total votes		11,625	100.0
Republican hold			

== District 70 ==
=== Republican primary ===
==== Candidates ====
===== Nominee =====
- Mike Fisher

===== Eliminated in primary =====
- Travis Huber, candidate for Judge/Executive of Mason County in 2022

==== Results ====
Republican primary results
Party	Candidate	Votes	%
Republican	Mike Fisher	3,020	57.9
Republican	Travis Huber	2,196	42.1
Total votes		5,216	100.0

=== Democratic primary ===
==== Candidates ====
- Charlotte Harris

=== General election ===
==== Results ====
2026 Kentucky's 70th House of Representatives district election
Party	Candidate	Votes	%
Republican	Mike Fisher	10,348	65.52
Democratic	Charlotte Harris	5,446	34.48
Total votes		15,794	100.0
Republican hold			

== District 71 ==
=== Republican primary ===
==== Candidates ====
- Josh Bray, incumbent representative

=== General election ===
==== Results ====
2026 Kentucky's 71st House of Representatives district election
Party	Candidate	Votes	%
Republican	Josh Bray (incumbent)	Unopposed	
Total votes		9,301	100.0
Republican hold			

== District 72 ==
=== Republican primary ===
==== Candidates ====
- Matthew Koch, incumbent representative

=== General election ===
==== Results ====
2026 Kentucky's 72nd House of Representatives district election
Party	Candidate	Votes	%
Republican	Matthew R. Koch (incumbent)	Unopposed	
Total votes		10,418	100.0
Republican hold			

== District 73 ==
=== Republican primary ===
==== Candidates ====
===== Nominee =====
- Daniel Konstantopoulos, Clark County magistrate (2015–present)

===== Eliminated in primary =====
- Les Yates, representative from the 73rd district (2019–2021) and judge/executive of Clark County (2023–2026)

==== Results ====
Republican primary results
Party	Candidate	Votes	%
Republican	Daniel Konstantopoulos	2,871	63.3
Republican	Les Yates	1,667	36.7
Total votes		4,538	100.0

=== Democratic primary ===
==== Candidates ====
===== Nominee =====
- Chelsea Kirk

===== Eliminated in primary =====
- Rory Houlihan, perennial candidate

==== Results ====
Democratic primary results
Party	Candidate	Votes	%
Democratic	Chelsea Kirk	2,226	61.8
Democratic	Rory Houlihan	1,377	38.2
Total votes		3,603	100.0

=== General election ===
==== Results ====
2026 Kentucky's 73rd House of Representatives district election
Party	Candidate	Votes	%
Republican	Daniel Konstantopoulos	8,584	54.40
Democratic	Chelsea Kirk	7,196	45.60
Total votes		15,780	100.0
Republican hold			

== District 74 ==
=== Republican primary ===
==== Candidates ====
===== Nominee =====
- David F. Charles, Montgomery County Sheriff (2019–present)

===== Eliminated in primary =====
- Shannon Denniston, Libertarian Party Montgomery County magistrate (2015–present)
- Aaron Williams

==== Results ====
Republican primary results
Party	Candidate	Votes	%
Republican	David F. Charles	3,224	65.5
Republican	Shannon Denniston	1,098	22.3
Republican	Aaron Williams	599	12.2
Total votes		4,921	100.0

=== General election ===
==== Results ====
2026 Kentucky's 74th House of Representatives district election
Party	Candidate	Votes	%
Republican	David F. Charles	Unopposed	
Total votes		11,091	100.0
Republican hold			

== District 75 ==
=== Democratic primary ===
==== Candidates ====
- Lindsey Burke, incumbent representative

=== Republican primary ===
==== Candidates ====
- Jeff Forsyth

=== Third-party candidates ===
==== Kentucky Party ====
- Geoff Young

=== General election ===
==== Results ====
2026 Kentucky's 75th House of Representatives district election
Party	Candidate	Votes	%
Democratic	Lindsey Burke (incumbent)	8,727	71.32
Republican	Jeff Forsyth	3,005	24.56
Kentucky	Geoffrey M. "Geoff" Young	505	4.13
Total votes		12,237	100.0
Democratic hold			

== District 76 ==
=== Democratic primary ===
==== Candidates ====
===== Nominee =====
- Anne Gay Donworth, incumbent representative

===== Eliminated in primary =====
- Jamie Palumbo, candidate for this district in 2024

==== Results ====
Democratic primary results
Party	Candidate	Votes	%
Democratic	Anne Gay Donworth (incumbent)	3,715	61.1
Democratic	Jamie Palumbo	2,366	38.9
Total votes		6,081	100.0

=== Republican primary ===
==== Candidates ====
- Avram Phoenix Hicks

=== General election ===
==== Results ====
2026 Kentucky's 76th House of Representatives district election
Party	Candidate	Votes	%
Democratic	Anne Gay Donworth (incumbent)	12,185	74.89
Republican	Avram Phoenix Hicks	4,085	25.11
Total votes		16,270	100.0
Democratic hold			

== District 77 ==
=== Democratic primary ===
==== Candidates ====
- George Brown Jr., incumbent representative

=== Republican primary ===
==== Candidates ====
- Jason Griffith, candidate for this district in 2024

=== General election ===
==== Results ====
2026 Kentucky's 77th House of Representatives district election
Party	Candidate	Votes	%
Democratic	George A. Brown Jr. (incumbent)	11,696	81.57
Republican	Jason Griffith	2,642	18.43
Total votes		14,338	100.0
Democratic hold			

== District 78 ==
=== Republican primary ===
==== Candidates ====
===== Nominee =====
- Mark Hart, incumbent representative

===== Eliminated in primary =====
- Brandon N. Montano

==== Results ====
Republican primary results
Party	Candidate	Votes	%
Republican	Mark Hart (incumbent)	4,852	74.2
Republican	Brandon N. Montano	1,683	25.8
Total votes		6,535	100.0

=== General election ===
==== Results ====
2026 Kentucky's 78th House of Representatives district election
Party	Candidate	Votes	%
Republican	Mark Hart (incumbent)	Unopposed	
Total votes		11,110	100.0
Republican hold			

== District 79 ==
=== Democratic primary ===
==== Candidates ====
- Chad Aull, incumbent representative

=== General election ===
==== Results ====
2026 Kentucky's 79th House of Representatives district election
Party	Candidate	Votes	%
Democratic	Chad R. Aull (incumbent)	Unopposed	
Total votes		10,226	100.0
Democratic hold			

== District 80 ==
=== Republican primary ===
==== Candidates ====
- David Meade, incumbent representative

=== Democratic primary ===
==== Candidates ====
- Mary Russell

=== General election ===
==== Results ====
2026 Kentucky's 80th House of Representatives district election
Party	Candidate	Votes	%
Republican	David Meade (incumbent)	9,583	74.83
Democratic	Mary Russell	3,223	25.17
Total votes		12,806	100.0
Republican hold			

== District 81 ==
=== Republican primary ===
==== Candidates ====
===== Nominee =====
- Deanna Gordon, incumbent representative

===== Eliminated in primary =====
- Andrew Simpson, candidate for Madison County magistrate in 2022

==== Results ====
Republican primary results
Party	Candidate	Votes	%
Republican	Deanna Frazier Gordon (incumbent)	3,212	65.6
Republican	Andrew Simpson	1,682	34.4
Total votes		4,894	100.0

=== Democratic primary ===
==== Candidates ====
- Anthony Looney

=== General election ===
==== Results ====
2026 Kentucky's 81st House of Representatives district election
Party	Candidate	Votes	%
Republican	Deanna Frazier Gordon (incumbent)	9,313	59.27
Democratic	Anthony Looney	6,399	40.73
Total votes		15,712	100.0
Republican hold			

== District 82 ==
=== Republican primary ===
==== Candidates ====
- Nick Wilson, incumbent representative

=== General election ===
==== Results ====
2026 Kentucky's 82nd House of Representatives district election
Party	Candidate	Votes	%
Republican	Nick Wilson (incumbent)	Unopposed	
Total votes		8,141	100.0
Republican hold			

== District 83 ==
=== Republican primary ===
==== Candidates ====
- Josh Branscum, incumbent representative

=== General election ===
==== Results ====
2026 Kentucky's 83rd House of Representatives district election
Party	Candidate	Votes	%
Republican	Joshua Branscum (incumbent)	Unopposed	
Total votes		11,373	100.0
Republican hold			

== District 84 ==
=== Republican primary ===
==== Candidates ====
- Chris Fugate, incumbent representative

=== General election ===
==== Results ====
2026 Kentucky's 84th House of Representatives district election
Party	Candidate	Votes	%
Republican	Chris Fugate (incumbent)	Unopposed	
Total votes		9,074	100.0
Republican hold			

== District 85 ==
=== Republican primary ===
==== Candidates ====
- Shane Baker, incumbent representative

=== General election ===
==== Results ====
2026 Kentucky's 85th House of Representatives district election
Party	Candidate	Votes	%
Republican	R. Shane Baker (incumbent)	Unopposed	
Total votes		10,818	100.0
Republican hold			

== District 86 ==
=== Republican primary ===
==== Candidates ====
- Tom Smith, incumbent representative

=== General election ===
==== Results ====
2026 Kentucky's 86th House of Representatives district election
Party	Candidate	Votes	%
Republican	Tom O'Dell Smith (incumbent)	Unopposed	
Total votes		7,846	100.0
Republican hold			

== District 87 ==
=== Republican primary ===
==== Candidates ====
- Adam Bowling, incumbent representative

=== General election ===
==== Results ====
2026 Kentucky's 87th House of Representatives district election
Party	Candidate	Votes	%
Republican	Adam Bowling (incumbent)	Unopposed	
Total votes		8,056	100.0
Republican hold			

== District 88 ==
=== Republican primary ===
==== Candidates ====
- Vanessa Grossl, incumbent representative

=== Democratic primary ===
==== Candidates ====
===== Disqualified =====
- Alisha Dawn Chaffin

=== Independent candidates ===
- L. Scott Miller

=== General election ===
==== Results ====
2026 Kentucky's 88th House of Representatives district election
Party	Candidate	Votes	%
Republican	Vanessa Grossl (incumbent)	7,720	52.66
Independent	L. Scott Miller	6,939	47.34
Total votes		14,659	100.0
Republican hold			

== District 89 ==
=== Republican primary ===
==== Candidates ====
- Timmy Truett, incumbent representative

=== General election ===
==== Results ====
2026 Kentucky's 89th House of Representatives district election
Party	Candidate	Votes	%
Republican	Timmy Truett (incumbent)	Unopposed	
Total votes		10,739	100.0
Republican hold			

== District 90 ==
=== Republican primary ===
==== Candidates ====
- Derek Lewis, incumbent representative

=== General election ===
==== Results ====
2026 Kentucky's 90th House of Representatives district election
Party	Candidate	Votes	%
Republican	Derek Lewis (incumbent)	Unopposed	
Total votes		9,514	100.0
Republican hold			

== District 91 ==
=== Republican primary ===
==== Candidates ====
===== Nominee =====
- Darrell Billings, candidate for this district in 2024 and 2022

===== Eliminated in primary =====
- Jeff Hensley

==== Results ====
Republican primary results
Party	Candidate	Votes	%
Republican	Darrell Billings	2,881	50.9
Republican	Jeff Hensley	2,783	49.1
Total votes		5,664	100.0

=== Democratic primary ===
==== Candidates ====
- David Johnson

=== General election ===
==== Results ====
2026 Kentucky's 91st House of Representatives district election
Party	Candidate	Votes	%
Republican	Darrell Billings	8,427	60.70
Democratic	David Johnson	5,457	39.30
Total votes		13,884	100.0
Republican hold			

== District 92 ==
=== Republican primary ===
==== Candidates ====
- John Blanton, incumbent representative

=== General election ===
==== Results ====
2026 Kentucky's 92nd House of Representatives district election
Party	Candidate	Votes	%
Republican	John Blanton (incumbent)	Unopposed	
Total votes		10,172	100.0
Republican hold			

== District 93 ==
=== Democratic primary ===
==== Candidates ====
- Adrielle Camuel, incumbent representative

=== Republican primary ===
==== Candidates ====
- Hannah Beth Rivera

=== General election ===
==== Results ====
2026 Kentucky's 93rd House of Representatives district election
Party	Candidate	Votes	%
Democratic	Adrielle Camuel (incumbent)	9,576	64.53
Republican	Hannah Beth Rivera	5,263	35.47
Total votes		14,839	100.0
Democratic hold			

== District 94 ==
=== Republican primary ===
==== Candidates ====
- Mitch Whitaker, incumbent representative

=== General election ===
==== Results ====
2026 Kentucky's 94th House of Representatives district election
Party	Candidate	Votes	%
Republican	Mitchum Addison Whitaker (incumbent)	Unopposed	
Total votes		8,709	100.0
Republican hold			

== District 95 ==
=== Democratic primary ===
==== Candidates ====
- Johnny Ray Turner, senator from the 29th district (2001–2021)

=== Republican primary ===
==== Candidates ====
===== Nominee =====
- Tanner Hesterberg, attorney and candidate for Kentucky's 29th Senate district in 2024

===== Eliminated in primary =====
- Willie Crase Jr., candidate for Kentucky's 29th Senate district in 2024 and Democratic nominee for judge/executive of Floyd County in 2022

==== Results ====
Republican primary results
Party	Candidate	Votes	%
Republican	Tanner Hesterberg	2,159	66.4
Republican	Willie Crase Jr.	1,092	33.6
Total votes		3,251	100.0

=== General election ===
==== Results ====
2026 Kentucky's 95th House of Representatives district election
Party	Candidate	Votes	%
Republican	Tanner Hesterberg	8,452	60.16
Democratic	Johnny Ray Turner	5,598	39.84
Total votes		14,050	100.0
Republican gain from Democratic			

== District 96 ==
=== Republican primary ===
==== Candidates ====
- Patrick Flannery, incumbent representative

=== Democratic primary ===
==== Candidates ====
- Pamela Lewis

=== General election ===
==== Results ====
2026 Kentucky's 96th House of Representatives district election
Party	Candidate	Votes	%
Republican	Patrick Flannery (incumbent)	8,140	68.32
Democratic	Pamela Lewis	3,774	31.68
Total votes		11,914	100.0
Republican hold			

== District 97 ==
=== Republican primary ===
==== Candidates ====
- Bobby McCool, incumbent representative

=== Democratic primary ===
==== Candidates ====
- Rebekah D. Skaggs

=== General election ===
==== Results ====
2026 Kentucky's 97th House of Representatives district election
Party	Candidate	Votes	%
Republican	Bobby W. McCool (incumbent)	7,995	75.53
Democratic	Rebekah D. Skaggs	2,590	24.47
Total votes		10,585	100.0
Republican hold			

== District 98 ==
=== Republican primary ===
==== Candidates ====
- Aaron Thompson, incumbent representative

=== General election ===
==== Results ====
2026 Kentucky's 98th House of Representatives district election
Party	Candidate	Votes	%
Republican	Aaron Thompson (incumbent)	Unopposed	
Total votes		9,512	100.0
Republican hold			

== District 99 ==
=== Republican primary ===
==== Candidates ====
- Richard White, incumbent representative

=== Democratic primary ===
==== Candidates ====
- Iva Markicevic Daley

=== General election ===
==== Results ====
2026 Kentucky's 99th House of Representatives district election
Party	Candidate	Votes	%
Republican	Richard Lee White (incumbent)	7,648	62.51
Democratic	Iva Markicevic Daley	4,586	37.49
Total votes		12,234	100.0
Republican hold			

== District 100 ==
=== Republican primary ===
==== Candidates ====
- Scott Sharp, incumbent representative

=== General election ===
==== Results ====
2026 Kentucky's 100th House of Representatives district election
Party	Candidate	Votes	%
Republican	Scott Sharp (incumbent)	Unopposed	
Total votes		8,021	100.0
Republican hold			

== See also ==
- 2026 Kentucky elections
  - 2026 Kentucky Senate election
  - 2026 United States Senate election in Kentucky
  - 2026 United States House of Representatives elections in Kentucky
