= Konstantopoulos =

Konstantopoulos (Greek: Κωνσταντόπουλος) is a Greek surname, with the feminine form being Konstantopoulou (Κωνσταντοπούλου). The surname is sometimes transliterated with a leading "C". Notable people with the surname include:

- Aikaterini Konstantopoulou, original name of Greek actress Katina Paxinou (1900–1973)
- Daniel Konstantopoulos, American politician
- Dimitrios Konstantopoulos (born 1978), Greek footballer
- Elina Konstantopoulou (born 1970), Greek singer
- Konstantinos Konstantopoulos (1832–1910), Greek Prime Minister
- Nikos Konstantopoulos (born 1942), Greek politician
- Zoi Konstantopoulou (born 1976), Greek politician and Speaker of Parliament

== See also ==
- Constantopoulos
