= Mitra Subedi =

American politician

Member-elect of the Kentucky House of Representatives from the 30th district
- Assuming office January 1, 2027
- Succeeding: Daniel Grossberg

Personal details
- Born: 1984 or 1985 (age 41–42) Chirang, Bhutan
- Party: Democratic
- Education: Tribhuvan University
- Occupation: Educator

Mitra Subedi (born 1984 or 1985) is an American educator and politician who is a member-elect of the Kentucky House of Representatives. A member of the Democratic Party, Subedi will represent Kentucky's 30th House district, which comprises part of Jefferson County.

== Background ==
Subedi was born in 1984 or 1985 in Chirang, Bhutan, and raised in a Bhutanese refugee camp in Nepal. In 2009, he received a postgraduate degree from Tribhuvan University. In 2011, he immigrated to the United States and settled in Louisville, Kentucky. He has since worked as bilingual instructor at Fern Creek High School as well as held leadership positions within local Bhutanese groups.

== Political career ==
=== 2024 Kentucky House election ===
In 2024, Subedi unsuccessfully challenged incumbent Daniel Grossberg for Kentucky's 30th House district, being defeated in the Democratic primary by a margin of 50 votes (49.2%).

=== 2026 Kentucky House election ===
Shortly after the 2024 election, Grossberg was accused by multiple women of sexual harassment, resulting in his expulsion from the House Democratic caucus and calls for his resignation from party leaders. However, Grossberg refused to resign and garnered three primary challengers for the 2026 election, among them being Subedi. Subedi was endorsed by former state representative Tom Burch, who previously held the seat for nearly fifty years before being defeated by Grossberg in 2022. Subedi won the Democratic primary with 2,095 votes (44.7%), and was unopposed in the general election that November.
