= Cole Cuzick =

Member-elect of the Kentucky House of Representatives from the 63rd district
- Assuming office January 1, 2027
- Succeeding: Kim Banta

Personal details
- Party: Republican
- Education: Oral Roberts University (BA)

Cole E. Cuzick is an American politician who is currently a member-elect of the Kentucky House of Representatives. A member of the Republican Party, Cuzick will represent Kentucky's 63rd House district, which comprises part of Boone and Kenton counties.

Cuzick defeated incumbent Kim Banta in the 2026 Republican primary for the seat by a margin of 13 votes.

== Background ==
Cuzick was born and raised in northern Kentucky. He attended Oral Roberts University in Tulsa, Oklahoma, where he graduated with a Bachelor of Arts degree in political science in 2017. The day after graduation, he married his wife, Rebecca, who also attended Oral Roberts. His wife is a licensed realtor who previously served as a commissioner of the Kentucky Commission on Human Rights.

Cuzick currently owns Cuzick Investments LLC., a real estate flipping investment firm which he founded in 2025.

== Political career ==
=== Early involvement ===
While in college, Cuzick worked as a field assistant for Americans for Prosperity as well as interned for Senator James Lankford of Oklahoma. After graduation, he returned to Kentucky and worked as a district staff assistant to Representative Thomas Massie of Kentucky's 4th congressional district. Afterwards, he briefly worked for The Family Foundation as a policy analyst before joining the Commonwealth Policy Center as director of political outreach in 2023.

=== 2026 Kentucky House election ===
In the 2026 Republican primary for Kentucky's 63rd House district, Cuzick defeated incumbent Kim Banta by a margin of 13 votes, garnering 2,220 votes (45.6%), and was unopposed in the general election that November.

== Electoral history ==
2026 Kentucky House of Representatives General Election Results
Party	Candidate	Votes	%
Republican	Cole Cuzick	8,518	100.0%

2026 Kentucky House of Representatives Republican Primary Election Results
Party	Candidate	Votes	%
Republican	Cole Cuzick	2,220	45.6%
Republican	Kim Banta	2,207	45.4%
Republican	Seth Winslow Young	435	8.9%
