= Joseph Redmond =

Joseph or Joe Redmond may refer to:

- Joe Redmond (American football) (Joseph R. Redmond, born c. 1945), American football coach
- Joe Redmond (footballer) (Joseph Patrick Redmond, born 2000), Irish footballer
- J. R. Redmond (Joseph Robert Redmond, born 1977), American football running back

== See also ==
- Joseph Redmon, American politician
