= Tanner Hesterberg =

American politician

Member-elect of the Kentucky House of Representatives from the 95th district
- Assuming office January 1, 2027
- Succeeding: Ashley Tackett Laferty

Personal details
- Party: Republican
- Education: Morehead State University (BA); University of Cincinnati (JD)

James Richard Tanner Hesterberg is an American politician from Kentucky. He is a member-elect of the Kentucky House of Representatives from the 95th district, which includes Floyd and part of Pike counties. He was elected in the 2026 Kentucky House of Representatives election, defeating former state senator Johnny Ray Turner. He is a member of the Republican Party.

Hesterberg was also a write-in candidate in the 2024 Kentucky Senate election in the 29th district, which had no candidates after the incumbent state senator Johnnie Turner died, and was won by Scott Madon.
