= Charles Miller (Kentucky politician) =

American politician (1939–2025)

Member of the Kentucky House of Representatives from the 28th district
- In office January 22, 1998 – January 1, 2023
- Preceded by: Bill Lile
- Succeeded by: Jared Bauman

Personal details
- Born: August 2, 1939 Tompkinsville, Kentucky, U.S.
- Died: June 8, 2025 (aged 85)
- Party: Democratic
- Education: Lindsey Wilson College; Western Kentucky University

Charles W. Miller (August 2, 1939 – June 8, 2025) was an American politician and Democratic member of the Kentucky House of Representatives from 1998 to 2023. He represented Kentucky's 28th House district, which includes southwest Jefferson County.

Miller was first elected in a January 1998 special election following the resignation of incumbent Republican representative Bill Lile. He was defeated for reelection in 2022 by Republican Jared Bauman.

== Background ==
Prior to entering politics, Miller earned his associate degree from Lindsey Wilson College, and his Bachelor of Arts degree as well as Master of Arts degree from Western Kentucky University.

He served as vice-principal of Doss High School from 1971 to 1977, and as the principal of Pleasure Ridge Park High School from 1978 to 2003. Pleasure Ridge's athletics complex is named in his honor.

Miller died on June 8, 2025, at the age of 85.

== Political career ==
=== Elections ===
- 1998 When District 28 Republican representative Bill Lile left the legislature and left the seat open, Miller was unopposed for the 1998 Democratic primary and won the November 3, 1998, general election against Republican nominee Doug Hawkins.
- 2000 Miller was unopposed for the 2000 Democratic primary and won the November 7, 2000, general election with 10,260 votes (67.1%) against Republican nominee Michael Clontz.
- 2002 Miller was unopposed for both the 2002 Democratic primary and also the November 5, 2002, general election, winning with 8,491 votes.
- 2004 Miller was unopposed for the 2004 Democratic primary and won the 2004 Kentucky House of Representatives election with 9,108 votes (53.4%) against Republican nominee Ron Gambrell.
- 2006 Miller unopposed for the 2006 Democratic primary and won the November 7, 2006, general election with 7,793 votes (63.8%) against Republican nominee John Brewer.
- 2008 Miller was unopposed for both the 2008 Democratic primary and the November 4, 2008, general election, winning with 12,859 votes.
- 2010 Miller and returning 2006 Republican challenger John Brewer both won their May 18, 2010, primaries, setting up a rematch; Miller won the November 2, 2010, general election with 6,874 votes (54.9%) against Brewer.
- 2012 Miller was unopposed for the May 22, 2012, Democratic primary and the November 6, 2012, general election, winning with 9,031 votes (56.1%) against Republican nominee Corey Koellner.
- 2014 Miller was unopposed in both the May 20, 2014, Democratic primary and the November 4, 2014, general election
- 2016 Miller was unopposed in the May 17, 2016, Democratic primary and defeated Republican Michael Payne in the 2016 Kentucky House of Representatives election.
- 2018 Miller was unopposed in the May 22, 2018, Democratic primary and is unopposed in the 2018 Kentucky House of Representatives election.
- 2020 Miller won the June 23, 2020, Democratic primary with 3,045 votes (58.7%) and was unopposed in the 2020 Kentucky House of Representatives election.
- 2022 Miller won the May 17, 2022, Democratic primary with 2,221 votes (65.6%) and was defeated in the 2022 Kentucky House of Representatives election, garnering 6,334 votes (43.6%) against Republican nominee Jared Bauman.
