= Almaria Baker =

American politician

Member-elect of the Kentucky House of Representatives from the 28th district
- Assuming office January 1, 2027
- Succeeding: Jared Bauman

Personal details
- Party: Democratic
- Education: University of Louisville; University of the Cumberlands
- Website: Campaign website

Almaria Baker is an American politician who is the member-elect for the 28th district of the Kentucky House of Representatives. She was elected at the 2026 election. She is a teacher with Jefferson County Public Schools.
