= Jim Yates (politician) =

American politician

Member of the Kentucky House of Representatives from the 44th district
- In office May 1972 – June 30, 1994
- Preceded by: James Yocom
- Succeeded by: Joni Jenkins

Personal details
- Born: James Bernard Yates; April 5, 1929 Louisville, Kentucky, U.S.
- Died: April 25, 2021 (aged 92) Louisville, Kentucky, U.S.
- Party: Democratic
- Relations: David Yates (grandson)
- Children: 4

James Bernard Yates Sr. (April 5, 1929 – April 25, 2021) was an American politician in the state of Kentucky. He served in the Kentucky House of Representatives as a Democrat from 1972 to 1995. Yates was first elected to the house in a May 1972 special election following the resignation of incumbent representative James Yocom. He did not seek reelection in 1994 and resigned from his seat early in June.
