= Kentucky's 30th House of Representatives district =

American legislative district

Kentucky's 30th State House of Representatives district
Representative
Daniel Grossberg; D–Louisville
since January 1, 2023
- Registration: 67.0% Democratic; 21.0% Republican; 11.4% No party preference
- Demographics: 35.8% White; 33.5% Black; 20.7% Hispanic; 4.9% Asian; 0.1% Native American; 0.4% Other; 4.6% Multiracial
- Population (2024): 46,041
- Registered voters (2026): 25,667

Kentucky's 30th House of Representatives district is one of 100 districts in the Kentucky House of Representatives. It comprises part of Jefferson County. It has been represented by Daniel Grossberg (D–Louisville) since 2023. As of 2024, the district had a population of 46,041.

== Voter registration ==
On January 1, 2026, the district had 25,667 registered voters, who were registered with the following parties.

Party	Registration	
Party	Voters	%
Democratic	17,190	66.97
Republican	5,389	21.00
Independent	1,204	4.69
Libertarian	90	0.35
Green	33	0.13
Constitution	16	0.06
Socialist Workers	10	0.04
Reform	1	0.00
"Other"	1,734	6.76
Total	25,667	100.00

== List of members representing the district ==
Member	Party	Years	Electoral history	District location
Tom Burch (Louisville)	Democratic	January 1, 1972 – January 1, 1976	Elected in 1971. Reelected in 1973. Lost reelection.	1972–1974; Jefferson County (part).
Tom Burch (Louisville)	Democratic	January 1, 1972 – January 1, 1976	Elected in 1971. Reelected in 1973. Lost reelection.	1974–1985; Jefferson County (part).
Jon Ackerson (Louisville)	Republican	January 1, 1976 – January 1, 1978	Elected in 1975. Retired to run for the Kentucky Senate.	1974–1985; Jefferson County (part).
Tom Burch (Louisville)	Democratic	January 1, 1978 – January 1, 2023	Elected in 1977. Reelected in 1979. Reelected in 1981. Reelected in 1984. Reelected in 1986. Reelected in 1988. Reelected in 1990. Reelected in 1992. Reelected in 1994. Reelected in 1996. Reelected in 1998. Reelected in 2000. Reelected in 2002. Reelected in 2004. Reelected in 2006. Reelected in 2008. Reelected in 2010. Reelected in 2012. Reelected in 2014. Reelected in 2016. Reelected in 2018. Reelected in 2020. Lost renomination.	1974–1985; Jefferson County (part).
Tom Burch (Louisville)	Democratic	January 1, 1978 – January 1, 2023	Elected in 1977. Reelected in 1979. Reelected in 1981. Reelected in 1984. Reelected in 1986. Reelected in 1988. Reelected in 1990. Reelected in 1992. Reelected in 1994. Reelected in 1996. Reelected in 1998. Reelected in 2000. Reelected in 2002. Reelected in 2004. Reelected in 2006. Reelected in 2008. Reelected in 2010. Reelected in 2012. Reelected in 2014. Reelected in 2016. Reelected in 2018. Reelected in 2020. Lost renomination.	1985–1993; Jefferson County (part).
Tom Burch (Louisville)	Democratic	January 1, 1978 – January 1, 2023	Elected in 1977. Reelected in 1979. Reelected in 1981. Reelected in 1984. Reelected in 1986. Reelected in 1988. Reelected in 1990. Reelected in 1992. Reelected in 1994. Reelected in 1996. Reelected in 1998. Reelected in 2000. Reelected in 2002. Reelected in 2004. Reelected in 2006. Reelected in 2008. Reelected in 2010. Reelected in 2012. Reelected in 2014. Reelected in 2016. Reelected in 2018. Reelected in 2020. Lost renomination.	1993–1997; Jefferson County (part).
Tom Burch (Louisville)	Democratic	January 1, 1978 – January 1, 2023	Elected in 1977. Reelected in 1979. Reelected in 1981. Reelected in 1984. Reelected in 1986. Reelected in 1988. Reelected in 1990. Reelected in 1992. Reelected in 1994. Reelected in 1996. Reelected in 1998. Reelected in 2000. Reelected in 2002. Reelected in 2004. Reelected in 2006. Reelected in 2008. Reelected in 2010. Reelected in 2012. Reelected in 2014. Reelected in 2016. Reelected in 2018. Reelected in 2020. Lost renomination.	1997–2003
Tom Burch (Louisville)	Democratic	January 1, 1978 – January 1, 2023	Elected in 1977. Reelected in 1979. Reelected in 1981. Reelected in 1984. Reelected in 1986. Reelected in 1988. Reelected in 1990. Reelected in 1992. Reelected in 1994. Reelected in 1996. Reelected in 1998. Reelected in 2000. Reelected in 2002. Reelected in 2004. Reelected in 2006. Reelected in 2008. Reelected in 2010. Reelected in 2012. Reelected in 2014. Reelected in 2016. Reelected in 2018. Reelected in 2020. Lost renomination.	2003–2015
Tom Burch (Louisville)	Democratic	January 1, 1978 – January 1, 2023	Elected in 1977. Reelected in 1979. Reelected in 1981. Reelected in 1984. Reelected in 1986. Reelected in 1988. Reelected in 1990. Reelected in 1992. Reelected in 1994. Reelected in 1996. Reelected in 1998. Reelected in 2000. Reelected in 2002. Reelected in 2004. Reelected in 2006. Reelected in 2008. Reelected in 2010. Reelected in 2012. Reelected in 2014. Reelected in 2016. Reelected in 2018. Reelected in 2020. Lost renomination.	2015–2023
Daniel Grossberg (Louisville)	Democratic	January 1, 2023 – present	Elected in 2022. Reelected in 2024. Lost renomination.	2023–present
Mitra Subedi (Louisville)	Democratic	Assuming office January 1, 2027	Elected in 2026.	2023–present
