= Aaron Currin =

American attorney and politician

Member-elect of the Kentucky House of Representatives from the 65th district
- Assuming office January 1, 2027
- Succeeding: Stephanie Dietz

Personal details
- Party: Democratic
- Education: Salmon P. Chase College of Law
- Occupation: Attorney; Adjunct Professor

Aaron John Currin is an American attorney and politician who is the member-elect for the Kentucky State House of Representatives from the 65th district. A member of the Democratic Party, Currin ran in the 2026 Kentucky House of Representatives election, beating incumbent Stephanie Dietz.

== Early life and education ==
Currin was born and raised within Northern Kentucky. He attended St. Pius X in Edgewood, Kentucky for elementary and middle school. Currin went on to attend Covington Catholic High School, graduating in 1995. He attended Northern Kentucky University, getting his Bachelors of Arts in English in 1999. Currin then got his Juris Doctorate from Chase College of Law in 2003.

== Career ==
Currin worked for the Kentucky Department of Public Advocacy as a public defender for 15 years. He also worked in Idaho, and is registered to practice law within Ohio.

Currin was nominated to succeed Kenton County Circuit Court Judge Gregory Bartlett, but ultimately lost the appointment to attorney Mary Malloy.

In 2024 Currin departed from being a public defender to open his own private practice.

Currin has also worked as an adjunct professor for both NKU and University of Cincinnati.

== Political Career ==
Currin first entered politics in 2024, running as the Democratic nominee in the 2024 Kentucky House of Representatives election for District 65, but lost to incumbent Stephanie Dietz.

In 2026, he faced Dietz again, this time winning the seat. He is set to assume office on January 1, 2027.

== Electoral History ==
Kentucky House of Representatives District 65 election, 2024
Party	Candidate	Votes	%
Republican	Stephanie Dietz (incumbent)	11,284	56.13%
Democratic	Aaron Currin	8,753	43.68%
Total votes		20,037	100%
Republican hold			

Kentucky House of Representatives District 65 election, 2026
Party	Candidate	Votes	%
Democratic	Aaron Currin	7,678	53%
Republican	Stephanie Dietz (incumbent)	6,769	47%
Total votes		14,417	100%
Democratic gain from Republican			
