= Kevin Jones (Kentucky politician) =

Member-elect of the Kentucky House of Representatives from the 52nd district
- Assuming office January 1, 2027
- Succeeding: Ken Upchurch

Personal details
- Party: Republican
- Occupation: Athletic director

Kevin G. Jones is an American athletic director and politician from Kentucky. A member of the Republican Party, Jones is a member-elect of the Kentucky House of Representatives from Kentucky's 52nd House district, which includes includes McCreary and Wayne counties as well as part of Pulaski County.

== Background ==
Prior to entering politics, Jones served as the athletics director of the Wayne County School District.

== Political career ==
=== 2026 Kentucky House election ===
In late 2025, longtime incumbent Ken Upchurch of Kentucky's 52nd House district announced that he would not be seeking reelection in 2026. Jones won the 2026 Republican primary with 5,429 votes (65%), and was unopposed in the general election that November.
