= Jared Bauman =

American politician

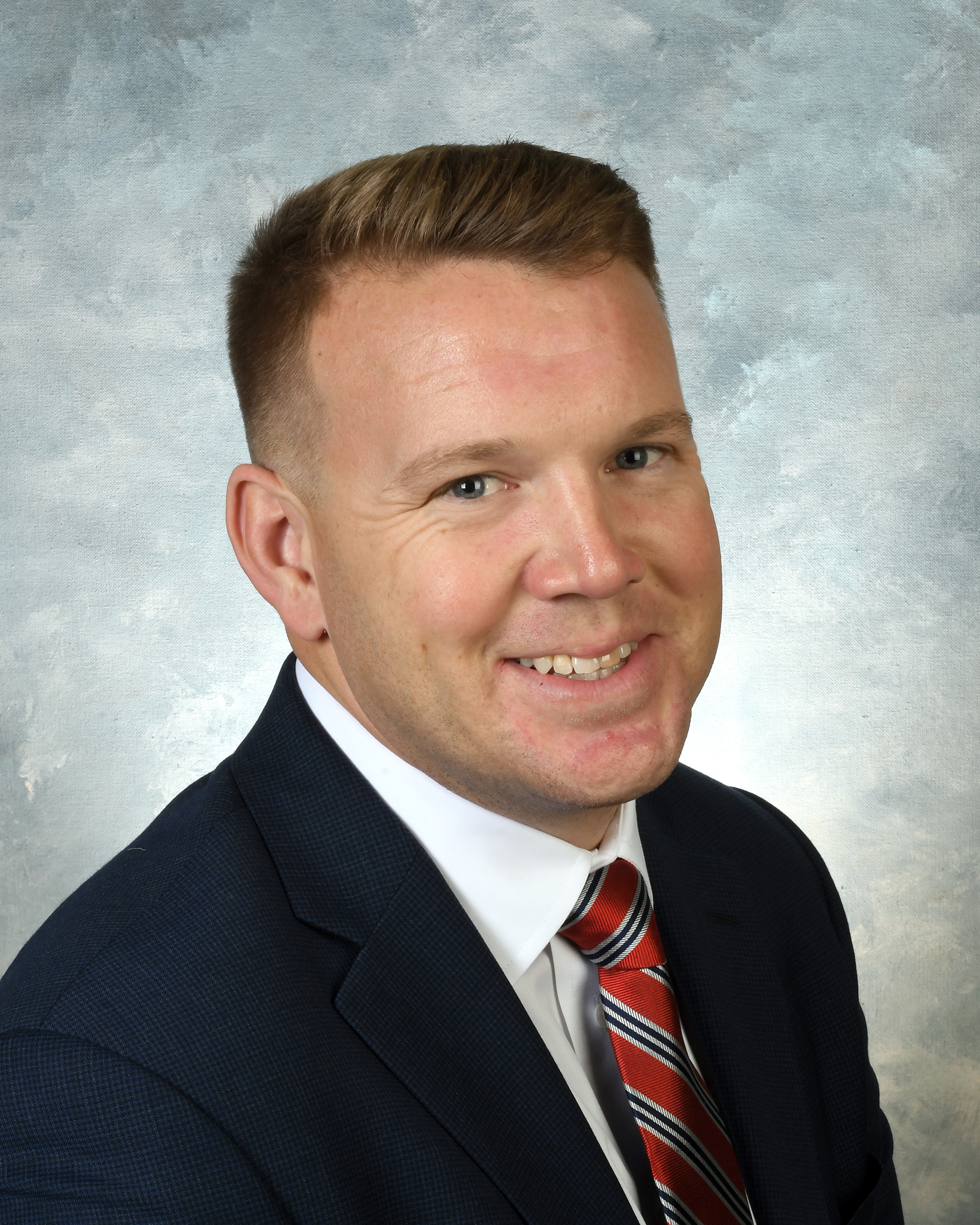

Member of the Kentucky House of Representatives from the 28th district
- Incumbent
- Assumed office January 1, 2023
- Preceded by: Charles Miller
- Succeeded by: Almaria Baker (elect)

Personal details
- Born: September 15, 1984 (age 42)
- Party: Republican
- Spouse: Amanda Bauman
- Children: 2
- Education: University of Louisville (Bachelor of Science)
- Committees: Economic Development & Workforce Investment; Education; Elections, Const. Amendments & Intergovernmental Affairs; Natural Resources & Energy

Jared A. Bauman (born September 15, 1984) is an American politician who has served as a member of the Kentucky House of Representatives since January 2023. He represents Kentucky's 28th House district which consists of southwest Louisville. Bauman was defeated for reelection in 2026, losing to Democratic candidate Almaria Baker.

== Background ==
Bauman grew up in Saint Andrews Park and attended Saint Polycarp Elementary before graduating from St. Xavier High School. He earned a Bachelor of Science in communication from the University of Louisville in 2008.

After college, Bauman worked for two years at Steel Technologies as their automotive accounts manager for North America. Since 2010, he has worked for the Lubrizol Corporation and currently is employed as manager of operational excellence for North and South America.

He is a Catholic.

== Political career ==
=== Safer Kentucky Act ===
During the 2024 Kentucky General Assembly, Bauman introduced and was the primary sponsor of House Bill 5, otherwise known as the "Safer Kentucky Act." Included in this bill were increased penalties for numerous crimes including drive by shootings, carjacking, murder of first responders, and trespassing. Also included in this bill was a "three strike law" to punish repeat violent offenders, measures to prevent charitable organizations from posting bail for violent offenders (also known as "Madelynn's Law"), and tougher sentencing for those who flee from the police (also known as "Jake's Law").

Despite being vetoed by Governor Andy Beshear, the bill was passed into law by a veto override on April 12 of that year.

=== Elections ===
- 2022 Bauman was unopposed in the 2022 Republican primary, and won the 2022 Kentucky House of Representatives election against Democratic incumbent Charles Miller, winning with 8,209 votes (56.4%).
- 2024 Bauman was unopposed in the 2024 Republican primary and won the 2024 Kentucky House of Representative election with 11,536 votes (58.6%) against Democratic candidate Almaria Baker.

Kentucky House of Representatives
Preceded by Charles Miller	Member of the Kentucky House of Representatives; 2023–present	Succeeded by incumbent
