= Buddy Wheatley =

American politician

Member of the Kentucky House of Representatives from the 65th district
- In office January 1, 2019 – January 1, 2023
- Preceded by: Arnold Simpson
- Succeeded by: Stephanie Dietz

Personal details
- Born: Charles Wheatley
- Party: Democratic
- Spouse: Judi Godsey
- Children: 2
- Education: University of Kentucky (BA); Northern Kentucky University (JD)

Charles "Buddy" Wheatley is an American politician from the Commonwealth of Kentucky. Wheatley served as a member of the Kentucky House of Representatives for the 65th District from 2019 to 2023.

In 2018, Wheatley ran for the House of Representatives, defeating Republican Jordan Huizenga. In 2020, he ran for a second term, defeating Republican Jamir Davis. In 2022, Wheatley ran for a third term but lost to Republican Stephanie Dietz by a 51%-49% margin.

On December 20, 2022, Wheatley announced that he was running for Secretary of State in 2023. He was ultimately unsuccessful, losing to incumbent secretary of state Michael Adams by a 60.6%-39.4% margin.

== Personal life ==
Wheatley graduated from the University of Kentucky with a bachelor's degree in Journalism in 1983 and an additional Bachelors of English from Northern Kentucky University (NKU) in 1997. Wheatley went on to complete his Juris Doctor from Chase Law School at NKU while serving as a Fire Chief for the Covington Fire Department in Covington, Kentucky, where he served for 20 years.

Wheatley is married to Judi Godsey; they have two children.

Party political offices
Preceded by Heather French Henry	Democratic nominee for Secretary of State of Kentucky; 2023	Most recent
