= Kentucky's 28th House of Representatives district =

American legislative district

Kentucky's 28th State House of Representatives district
Representative
| Jared Bauman; R–Louisville |
since January 1, 2023
- Registration: 50.2% Democratic; 37.7% Republican; 11.5% No party preference
- Demographics: 71.4% White; 13.0% Black; 8.8% Hispanic; 0.8% Asian; 0.1% Native American; 0.3% Other; 5.6% Multiracial
- Population (2024): 47,653
- Registered voters (2026): 33,353

Kentucky's 28th House of Representatives district is one of 100 districts in the Kentucky House of Representatives. It comprises part of Jefferson County. It has been represented by Jared Bauman (R–Louisville) since 2023. As of 2024, the district had a population of 47,653.

== Voter registration ==
On January 1, 2026, the district had 33,353 registered voters, who were registered with the following parties.

| Party | Registration | |
| Party | Voters | % |
|---|---|---|
| Democratic | 16,753 | 50.23 |
| Republican | 12,573 | 37.70 |
| Independent | 1,630 | 4.89 |
| Libertarian | 141 | 0.42 |
| Green | 23 | 0.07 |
| Constitution | 13 | 0.04 |
| Reform | 5 | 0.01 |
| Socialist Workers | 3 | 0.01 |
| "Other" | 2,212 | 6.63 |
| Total | 33,353 | 100.00 |

== List of members representing the district ==
| Member | Party | Years | Electoral history | District location |
|---|---|---|---|---|
| Bill Lile (Valley Station) | Republican | January 1, 1985 – November 15, 1997 | Redistricted from the 27th district and reelected in 1984. Reelected in 1986. Reelected in 1988. Reelected in 1990. Reelected in 1992. Reelected in 1994. Reelected in 1996. Resigned. | 1985–1993; Jefferson County (part). |
| Bill Lile (Valley Station) | Republican | January 1, 1985 – November 15, 1997 | Redistricted from the 27th district and reelected in 1984. Reelected in 1986. Reelected in 1988. Reelected in 1990. Reelected in 1992. Reelected in 1994. Reelected in 1996. Resigned. | 1993–1997; Jefferson County (part). |
| Bill Lile (Valley Station) | Republican | January 1, 1985 – November 15, 1997 | Redistricted from the 27th district and reelected in 1984. Reelected in 1986. Reelected in 1988. Reelected in 1990. Reelected in 1992. Reelected in 1994. Reelected in 1996. Resigned. | 1997–2003 |
| Charles Miller (Louisville) | Democratic | January 22, 1998 – January 1, 2023 | Elected to finish Lile's term. Reelected in 1998. Reelected in 2000. Reelected in 2002. Reelected in 2004. Reelected in 2006. Reelected in 2008. Reelected in 2010. Reelected in 2012. Reelected in 2014. Reelected in 2016. Reelected in 2018. Reelected in 2020. Lost reelection. | 1997–2003 |
| Charles Miller (Louisville) | Democratic | January 22, 1998 – January 1, 2023 | Elected to finish Lile's term. Reelected in 1998. Reelected in 2000. Reelected in 2002. Reelected in 2004. Reelected in 2006. Reelected in 2008. Reelected in 2010. Reelected in 2012. Reelected in 2014. Reelected in 2016. Reelected in 2018. Reelected in 2020. Lost reelection. | 2003–2015 |
| Charles Miller (Louisville) | Democratic | January 22, 1998 – January 1, 2023 | Elected to finish Lile's term. Reelected in 1998. Reelected in 2000. Reelected in 2002. Reelected in 2004. Reelected in 2006. Reelected in 2008. Reelected in 2010. Reelected in 2012. Reelected in 2014. Reelected in 2016. Reelected in 2018. Reelected in 2020. Lost reelection. | 2015–2023 |
| Jared Bauman (Louisville) | Republican | January 1, 2023 – present | Elected in 2022. Reelected in 2024. Lost reelection. | 2023–present |
| Almaria Baker (Louisville) | Democratic | Assuming office January 1, 2027 | Elected in 2026. | 2023–present |
