= Robert LeVertis Bell =

Member-elect of the Kentucky House of Representatives from the 43rd district
- Assuming office January 1, 2027
- Succeeding: Pamela Stevenson

Personal details
- Party: Democratic
- Other political affiliations: Democratic Socialists of America
- Education: University of Louisville; University of Michigan (attended)
- Occupation: Educator; activist

Robert LeVertis Bell Jr. is an American activist and politician from Kentucky. A member of the Democratic Party, Bell is a member-elect of the Kentucky House of Representatives from Kentucky's 43rd House district, which includes part of Jefferson County.

Bell is affiliated with the Democratic Socialists of America, and is the first self-described socialist elected to the Kentucky General Assembly in modern times.

== Background ==
Bell is a native of Louisville, Kentucky, and the grandson of local civil rights leader, Mattie Jones. He is a graduate of the University of Louisville, and was a doctoral student in American culture at the University of Michigan.

He is an english teacher at Frederick Law Olmstead Academy North, an all-boys public school in South Louisville.

== Political career ==
=== Activism and local involvement ===
Bell has been activist for over twenty years, and has long been involved with Louisville's Democratic Socialists of America (DSA) chapter. When U.S. Senator Bernie Sanders visited Louisville as part of his 2020 Presidential campaign, he was introduced by Bell. He specifically has been active in the DSA's Bread and Roses caucus, a group composed of militant-labor marxist organizers.

He served for three years as vice president of the Shelby Park Neighborhood Association.

=== Unsuccessful elections ===
In 2020, incumbent Barbara Sexton Smith of the Louisville Metro Council's 4th district chose not to seek reelection. Bell placed second in the Democratic primary election, garnering 1,236 votes (28.5%).

In 2022, Bell unsuccessfully challenged incumbent state representative Pamela Stevenson of Kentucky's 43rd House district in that year's Democratic primary election, garnering 2,255 votes (46.2%).

=== 2026 Kentucky House election ===
In 2026, Stevenson chose not to seek reelection to the Kentucky House, and instead sought the Democratic nomination for United States Senate. Bell was the first candidate endorsed in 2026 by the national DSA organization, and also received the endorsement of Sanders. He subsequently won the Democratic nomination with 2,938 votes (54.6%), and was unopposed in the general election. He is the first self-described socialist elected to the Kentucky General Assembly in modern times.
