= Beverly Chester-Burton =

American politician (born 1963)

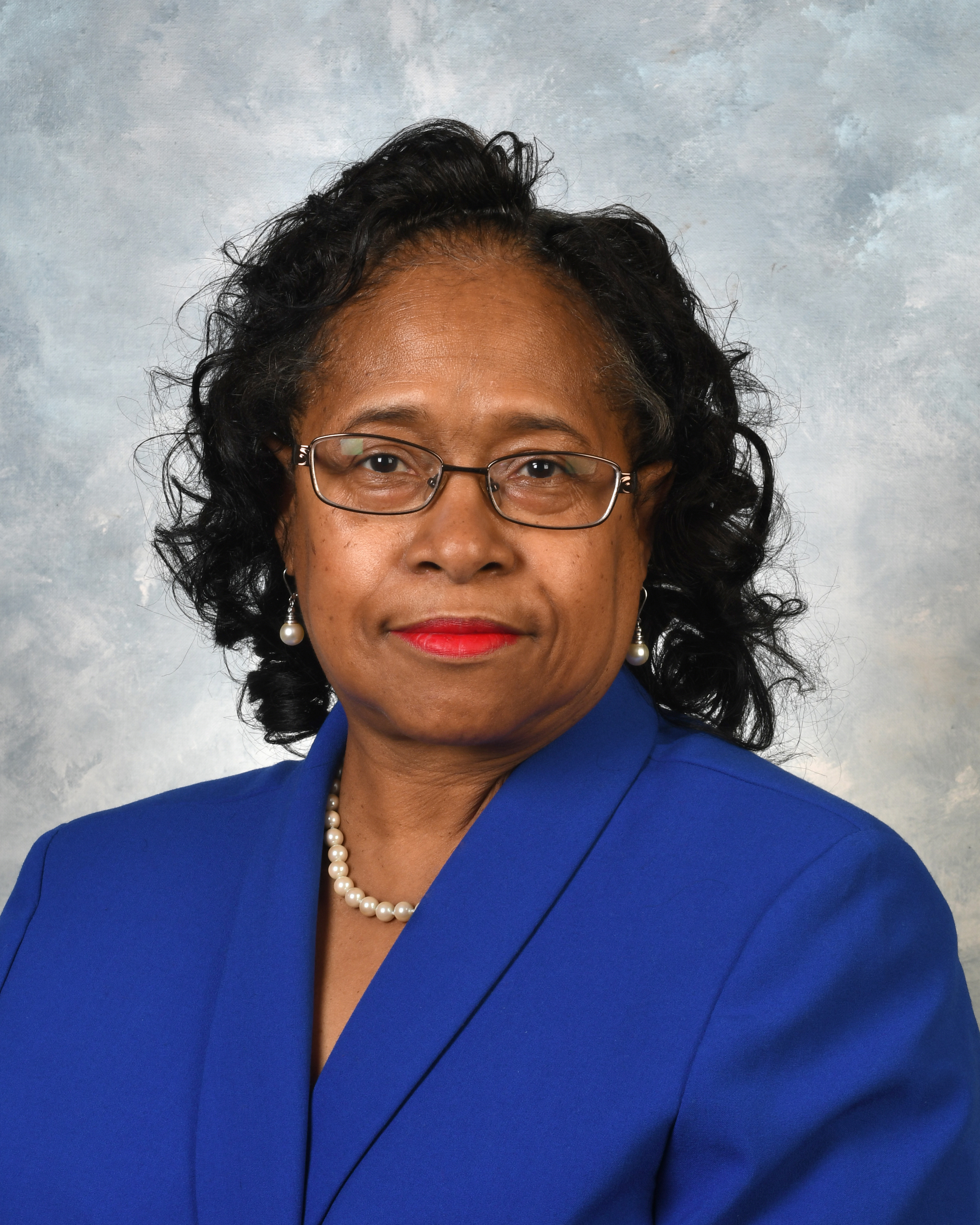

Member of the Kentucky House of Representatives from the 44th district
- Incumbent
- Assumed office January 1, 2023
- Preceded by: Joni Jenkins

Mayor of Shively
- In office January 2019 – January 2023

Personal details
- Born: October 3, 1961 (age 65)
- Party: Democratic
- Education: University of Louisville, Spalding University, Western Kentucky University

Beverly Denise Chester-Burton (born October 3, 1961) is an American politician who has served as a member of the Kentucky House of Representatives since January 1, 2023. She represents Kentucky's 44th House district. Outside of politics, she is a teacher in Jefferson County Public Schools. Chester-Burton was defeated for renomination by Kenya Wade in the 2026 Kentucky House of Representatives election.

== Electoral history ==
On November 6, 2018, she was elected as the first African-American mayor of Shively, Kentucky, with 97.8% of the vote after serving 10 years on the city council. She was elected on November 8, 2022, in the 2022 Kentucky House of Representatives election. She assumed office on January 1, 2023.

== Biography ==
Chester-Burton was born in 1961 to parents Cozy and Linnes Chester Sr. She graduated from the University of Louisville, Spalding University and Western Kentucky University.

Kentucky House of Representatives
Preceded by Joni Jenkins	Member of the Kentucky House of Representatives; 2023–present	Succeeded by incumbent
