= Kenya Wade =

American politician and activist

Member-elect of the Kentucky House of Representatives from the 44th district
- Assuming office January 1, 2027
- Succeeding: Beverly Chester-Burton

Personal details
- Party: Democratic
- Education: Sullivan University (AS); Spalding University (BA, MSW)
- Occupation: Activist; social worker (former)

Kenya Wade is an American activist and politician from Kentucky. A member of the Democratic Party, Wade is a member-elect of the Kentucky House of Representatives from Kentucky's 44th House district, which includes part of Jefferson County.

== Background and education ==
Kenya Wade is a native of Louisville, Kentucky. In October 2010, she graduated from Sullivan University with an Associate degree in legal administration. She later graduated from Spalding University with a Bachelor of Arts degree in social work as well as a Master of Social Work degree.

== Career ==
=== Social work and conviction ===
From 2017 to 2019, Wade was a social worker for the Kentuckiana Regional Planning & Development Agency (KIPDA).

In August 2019, she was hired as a social services clinician at the Kentucky State Reformatory. Shortly thereafter however, she began a relationship with Cedric Thompson, a convict known as the "Lyndon Rapist" who was serving a 70-year sentence at the reformatory for raping two woman and attempting to assault a third in 2001. This included using an alias to explicitly and sexually communicate with Thompson via the reformatory's JPay system.

She was arrested and charged with first degree official misconduct, for which she was found guilty by a jury in 2022.

=== Activism ===
Wade is the founder of Cyclebreakers Breaking Chains, a nonprofit she established in 2020 aimed at preventing gun violence by providing mentorship and education to at-risk youth. She was inspired after her teenage daughter was nearly killed in a shooting in 2016.

== Political career ==
=== 2026 Kentucky House election ===
In 2026, Wade successfully challenged incumbent Beverly Chester-Burton for Kentucky's 44th House district, winning the three-way Democratic primary by a five-vote margin, and was unopposed in the general election that November. Notably, all three candidates for the Democratic nomination had criminal records.
