= Jon Ackerson =

American lawyer and politician

Member of the Louisville Metro Council
- In office January 2009 – January 2013
- Preceded by: Julie Raque Adams
- Succeeded by: Marilyn Parker

Member of the Jeffersontown City Council
- In office January 1997 – January 2003

Member of the Kentucky House of Representatives from the 47th district
- In office January 1, 1987 – January 1, 1997
- Preceded by: Edward Holloway
- Succeeded by: Ronald Crimm

Member of the Kentucky Senate from the 34th district
- In office January 1, 1978 – January 1, 1987
- Preceded by: Daisy Thaler
- Succeeded by: Landon Sexton (redistricting)

Member of the Kentucky House of Representatives from the 30th district
- In office January 1, 1976 – January 1, 1978
- Preceded by: Tom Burch
- Succeeded by: Tom Burch

Personal details
- Born: July 29, 1943 (age 83) Louisville, Jefferson County; Kentucky, USA
- Party: Republican
- Spouse(s): (1) Patricia Ormerod Ackerson (divorced) (2) Kay B. Meurer Ackerson
- Children: From first marriage: Brent Thomas Ackerson; Marc Alan Ackerson; Stepchildren from second marriage: Mark I. Meurer; Penny A. Meurer; Amy L. Vanover
- Education: University of Indianapolis University of Louisville School of Law
- Occupation: Lawyer

Jon Winston Ackerson (born July 29, 1943) is a former member of the Kentucky House of Representatives, and the Kentucky Senate.
