= Joni Jenkins =

American politician (born 1958)

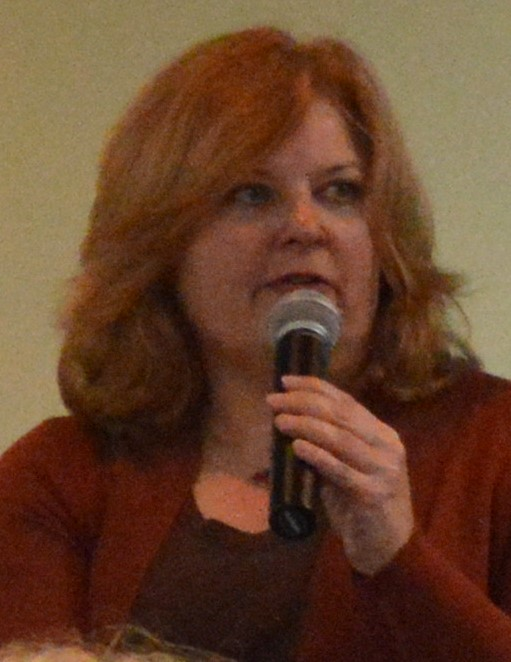

Minority Leader of the Kentucky House of Representatives
- In office December 20, 2019 – January 1, 2023
- Preceded by: Rocky Adkins
- Succeeded by: Derrick Graham

Member of the Kentucky House of Representatives from the 44th district
- In office January 1, 1995 – January 1, 2023
- Preceded by: Jim Yates
- Succeeded by: Beverly Chester-Burton

Personal details
- Born: December 6, 1958 (age 67)
- Party: Democratic
- Education: University of Kentucky (BA)
- Website: Campaign website

Joni Lynn Jenkins (born December 6, 1958) is an American politician and a former Democratic member of the Kentucky House of Representatives, representing District 44 from 1995 until 2023. She also served as Minority Leader in the House from December 2019 until January 2023.

== Education ==
Jenkins earned her BA from the University of Kentucky.

== Political career ==
In the 2000s, Jenkins began caucusing with other female legislators (including Susan Johns, Ruth Ann Palumbo, Eleanor Jordan, Mary Lou Marzian, Kathy Stein, and more) to track legislation in their individual fields of expertise and work together to affect legislation more easily than they could have done alone. One early victory involved "building statewide opposition to a bill that, before their organized effort, likely would have gone unnoticed and passed easily, [...] removing the requirement that educational institutions offer women's softball as well as men's baseball, violating the spirit if not the letter of Title IX."

== Elections ==
- 2012 Jenkins was unopposed for the May 22, 2012 Democratic Primary and won the November 6, 2012 General election with 11,810 votes (70.1%) against Republican nominee Gail Powers.
- 1994 Jenkins won the 1994 Democratic Primary and was unopposed for the November 8, 1994 General election.
- 1996 Jenkins was unopposed for both the 1996 Democratic Primary and the November 5, 1996 General election.
- 1998 Jenkins was unopposed for the 1998 Democratic Primary and won the November 3, 1998 General election against Republican nominee James Maxfield.
- 2000 Jenkins was unopposed for both the 2000 Democratic Primary and the November 7, 2000 General election, winning with 11,221 votes.
- 2002 Jenkins was challenged in the 2002 Democratic Primary, winning with 2,578 votes (69.3%) and was unopposed for the November 5, 2002 General election, winning with 8,741 votes.
- 2004 Jenkins was unopposed for both the 2004 Democratic Primary and the November 2, 2004 General election, winning with 12,782 votes.
- 2006 Jenkins was unopposed for both the 2006 Democratic Primary and the November 7, 2006 General election, winning with 9,309 votes.
- 2008 Jenkins was unopposed for both the 2008 Democratic Primary and the November 4, 2008 General election, winning with 13,911 votes.
- 2010 Jenkins was unopposed for both the May 18, 2010 Democratic Primary and the November 2, 2010 General election, winning with 8,459 votes when Republican challenger Gail Powers did not qualify.

Kentucky House of Representatives
Preceded by Rocky Adkins	Minority Leader of the Kentucky House of Representatives; 2019–2023	Succeeded by Derrick Graham
