= Kentucky's 44th House of Representatives district =

American legislative district

Kentucky's 44th State House of Representatives district
Representative
Beverly Chester-Burton; D–Louisville
since January 1, 2023
- Registration: 69.5% Democratic; 20.1% Republican; 10.0% No party preference
- Demographics: 36.5% White; 48.6% Black; 8.5% Hispanic; 0.5% Asian; 0.5% Other; 5.4% Multiracial
- Population (2024): 45,617
- Registered voters (2026): 29,991

Kentucky's 44th House of Representatives district is one of 100 districts in the Kentucky House of Representatives. It comprises part of Jefferson County. It has been represented by Beverly Chester-Burton (D–Louisville) since 2023. As of 2024, the district had a population of 45,617.

== Voter registration ==
On January 1, 2026, the district had 29,991 registered voters, who were registered with the following parties.

Party	Registration	
Party	Voters	%
Democratic	20,850	69.52
Republican	6,017	20.06
Independent	1,195	3.98
Libertarian	75	0.25
Green	24	0.08
Constitution	12	0.04
Socialist Workers	8	0.03
Reform	1	0.00
"Other"	1,809	6.03
Total	29,991	100.00

== List of members representing the district ==
Member	Party	Years	Electoral history	District location
Jim Yates (Louisville)	Democratic	May 1972 – June 30, 1994	Elected to finish Yocom's term. Reelected in 1973. Reelected in 1975. Reelected in 1977. Reelected in 1979. Reelected in 1981. Reelected in 1984. Reelected in 1986. Reelected in 1988. Reelected in 1990. Reelected in 1992. Resigned.	1972–1974; Jefferson County (part).
Jim Yates (Louisville)	Democratic	May 1972 – June 30, 1994	Elected to finish Yocom's term. Reelected in 1973. Reelected in 1975. Reelected in 1977. Reelected in 1979. Reelected in 1981. Reelected in 1984. Reelected in 1986. Reelected in 1988. Reelected in 1990. Reelected in 1992. Resigned.	1974–1985; Jefferson County (part).
Jim Yates (Louisville)	Democratic	May 1972 – June 30, 1994	Elected to finish Yocom's term. Reelected in 1973. Reelected in 1975. Reelected in 1977. Reelected in 1979. Reelected in 1981. Reelected in 1984. Reelected in 1986. Reelected in 1988. Reelected in 1990. Reelected in 1992. Resigned.	1985–1993; Jefferson County (part).
Jim Yates (Louisville)	Democratic	May 1972 – June 30, 1994	Elected to finish Yocom's term. Reelected in 1973. Reelected in 1975. Reelected in 1977. Reelected in 1979. Reelected in 1981. Reelected in 1984. Reelected in 1986. Reelected in 1988. Reelected in 1990. Reelected in 1992. Resigned.	1993–1997; Jefferson County (part).
Joni Jenkins (Shively)	Democratic	January 1, 1995 – January 1, 2023	Elected in 1994. Reelected in 1996. Reelected in 1998. Reelected in 2000. Reelected in 2002. Reelected in 2004. Reelected in 2006. Reelected in 2008. Reelected in 2010. Reelected in 2012. Reelected in 2014. Reelected in 2016. Reelected in 2018. Reelected in 2020. Retired.	1993–1997; Jefferson County (part).
Joni Jenkins (Shively)	Democratic	January 1, 1995 – January 1, 2023	Elected in 1994. Reelected in 1996. Reelected in 1998. Reelected in 2000. Reelected in 2002. Reelected in 2004. Reelected in 2006. Reelected in 2008. Reelected in 2010. Reelected in 2012. Reelected in 2014. Reelected in 2016. Reelected in 2018. Reelected in 2020. Retired.	1997–2003
Joni Jenkins (Shively)	Democratic	January 1, 1995 – January 1, 2023	Elected in 1994. Reelected in 1996. Reelected in 1998. Reelected in 2000. Reelected in 2002. Reelected in 2004. Reelected in 2006. Reelected in 2008. Reelected in 2010. Reelected in 2012. Reelected in 2014. Reelected in 2016. Reelected in 2018. Reelected in 2020. Retired.	2003–2015
Joni Jenkins (Shively)	Democratic	January 1, 1995 – January 1, 2023	Elected in 1994. Reelected in 1996. Reelected in 1998. Reelected in 2000. Reelected in 2002. Reelected in 2004. Reelected in 2006. Reelected in 2008. Reelected in 2010. Reelected in 2012. Reelected in 2014. Reelected in 2016. Reelected in 2018. Reelected in 2020. Retired.	2015–2023
Beverly Chester-Burton (Shively)	Democratic	January 1, 2023 – present	Elected in 2022. Reelected in 2024. Lost renomination.	2023–present
Kenya Wade (Louisville)	Democratic	Assuming office January 1, 2027	Elected in 2026.	2023–present
