= Mike Fisher (Kentucky politician) =

American politician

Member-elect of the Kentucky House of Representatives from the 70th district
- Assuming office January 2027
- Succeeding: William Lawrence

Personal details
- Party: Republican
- Education: University of Dayton (BS)
- Occupation: Engineer

Michael K. Fisher is an American engineer and politician from Kentucky. A member of the Republican Party, he is a member-elect of the Kentucky House of Representatives from Kentucky's 70th House district, which is composed of Bracken, Harrison, Mason, and Robertson counties.

== Background ==
Fisher attended the University of Dayton, graduating in 1988 with a Bachelor of Science degree in mechanical engineering and a minor in industrial engineering. He returned to Dayton in 1995, and graduated the next year with a degree in manufacturing engineering.

For nearly thirty years, Fisher has been employed by the 3M Corporation at their plant in Cynthiana.

== Political career ==
=== Early involvement ===
In 2010, Fisher unsuccessfully ran for a seat on the Harrison County Board of Education. Since 2012, he has served as chairman of the Harrison County Republican Party.

=== Kentucky House of Representatives ===
In 2026, incumbent state representative William Lawrence of Kentucky's 70th House district chose not to seek reelection. Fisher won the Republican primary with 3,020 votes (57.9%), and the general election with 65% of the vote.
