= Darrell Billings =

- Billings in 2026

Member-elect of the Kentucky House of Representatives from the 91st district
- Assuming office January 1, 2027
- Succeeding: Bill Wesley

Personal details
- Party: Republican
- Education: Eastern Kentucky University (attended)
- Occupation: Businessman, farmer

Darrell W. Billings is an American businessman and politician who has served as a member of the Kentucky House of Representatives since January 2027. A member of the Republican Party, Billings represents Kentucky's 91st House district, which consists of Estill and Powell counties as well as part of Madison County.

== Background ==
Darrell Billings is a native of Powell County, Kentucky. His father had a twenty-five year career in law enforcement while his mother was a teacher. He graduated from Powell County High School in 1981, and afterwards attended Eastern Kentucky University.

He is a third generation farmer, and owns a car dealership alongside his wife in Stanton.

== Political career ==
=== Appointed roles ===
From 2016 to 2024, Billings served on the board of the Kentucky High School Athletic Association as an appointee from the Kentucky Department of Education, and was the first member to serve two terms as board president. One of his terms as president took place during the COVID-19 pandemic, from which he oversaw the return of high school sports after the 2020 lockdowns.

In 2023, he was appointed by Kentucky Commissioner of Agriculture-elect Jonathan Shell to serve as a member of his transition team.

=== 2022 Kentucky House election ===
In 2022, Billings unsuccessfully challenged incumbent Bill Wesley for the Republican nomination for Kentucky's 91st House district, garnering 1,459 votes (36.8%).

=== 2024 Kentucky House election ===
In 2024, Billings again unsuccessfully challenged Wesley, garnering 1,470 votes (46.8%).

=== 2026 Kentucky House election ===
In 2026, Wesley chose not to seek reelection, and instead choose to challenge Senator Brandon Smith of Kentucky's 30th Senate district. Billings won the Republican primary election with 2,881 votes (50.9%), and the general election against Democratic nominee David Johnson.
