= Stephanie Dietz =

American politician (born 1969)

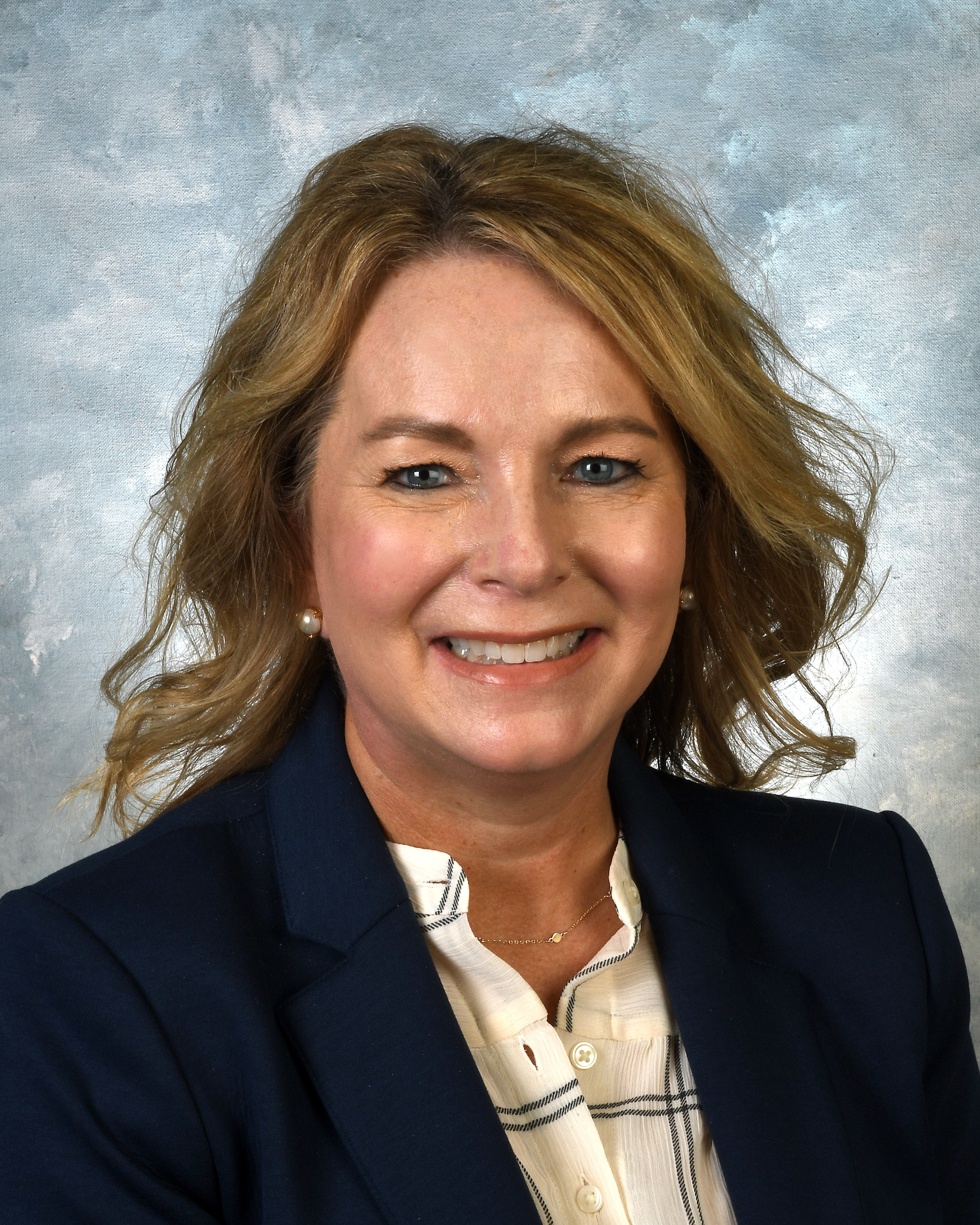

Member of the Kentucky House of Representatives from the 65th district
- Incumbent
- Assumed office January 1, 2023
- Preceded by: Buddy Wheatley

Personal details
- Born: February 2, 1969 (age 57) Versailles, Kentucky
- Party: Republican
- Children: 2
- Education: University of Kentucky (BA); Salmon P. Chase College of Law (JD)
- Profession: Attorney
- Committees: Budget Review Subcommittee on Justice, Public Safety, and Judiciary (chair); Appropriations & Revenue; Families & Children; Judiciary; Licensing, Occupations, and Administrative Regulations

Stephanie Ann Dietz (née Farley; born February 2, 1969) is an American politician and Republican member of the Kentucky House of Representatives from Kentucky's 65th House district since January 2023. Her district includes part of Kenton County. Dietz was defeated for reelection in 2026, losing to Democratic candidate Aaron Currin.

== Background ==
Dietz was born on February 2, 1969, in Versailles, Kentucky. She graduated from Woodford County High School in 1987 before earning a Bachelor of Arts in political science from the University of Kentucky in 1990. She moved to Northern Kentucky in 1991 and earned a Juris Doctor from Northern Kentucky University's Salmon P. Chase College of Law in 1994. She was admitted to the Kentucky Bar Association that same year.

In 2020, Dietz opened her own private practice in Edgewood focused on family law.

== Political career ==
- 2014 Dietz was defeated in the 2014 Kentucky 16th Judicial Circuit election, garnering 16,534 votes (45.4%) against incumbent Fifth Division Judge Lisa Osborne Bushelman.
- 2022 Dietz was unopposed in the 2022 Republican primary and won the 2022 Kentucky House of Representatives election with 6,912 votes (51%) against Democratic incumbent Charles "Buddy" Wheatley.
- 2024 Dietz was unopposed in the 2024 Republican primary and won the 2024 Kentucky House of Representatives election with face 11,284 votes (56.3%) against Democratic candidate Aaron Currin.
