= David Charles (American politician) =

American politician (born 1965)

Member-elect of the Kentucky House of Representatives from the 74th district
- Assuming office January 1, 2027
- Succeeding: David Hale

Sheriff of Montgomery County
- Incumbent
- Assumed office January 7, 2019
- Preceded by: Fred Shortridge

Personal details
- Born: David Farrell Charles; July 27, 1965 (age 61) Mount Sterling, Kentucky, U.S.
- Party: Republican

David Farrell Charles (born July 27, 1965) is an American politician who has served as sheriff of Montgomery County since January 2019. On November 3, 2026, he was elected to the Kentucky House of Representatives and will represent the 74th district, which comprises Bath, Menifee and Montgomery counties.

== Electoral history ==
=== 2026 ===
Kentucky House of Representatives
| Preceded by David Hale | Member of the Kentucky House of Representatives from the 74th district 2025–present | Succeeded by incumbent |
