= Daniel Konstantopoulos =

American politician

Member-elect of the Kentucky House of Representatives from the 73rd district
- Assuming office January 1, 2027
- Succeeding: Ryan Dotson

Personal details
- Party: Republican
- Website: Campaign website

Daniel Konstantopoulos is an American politician who is the member-elect for the 73rd district of the Kentucky House of Representatives. He was elected at the 2026 election. He is a businessman. He supports term limits.
