= Tom Burch =

American politician (born 1931)

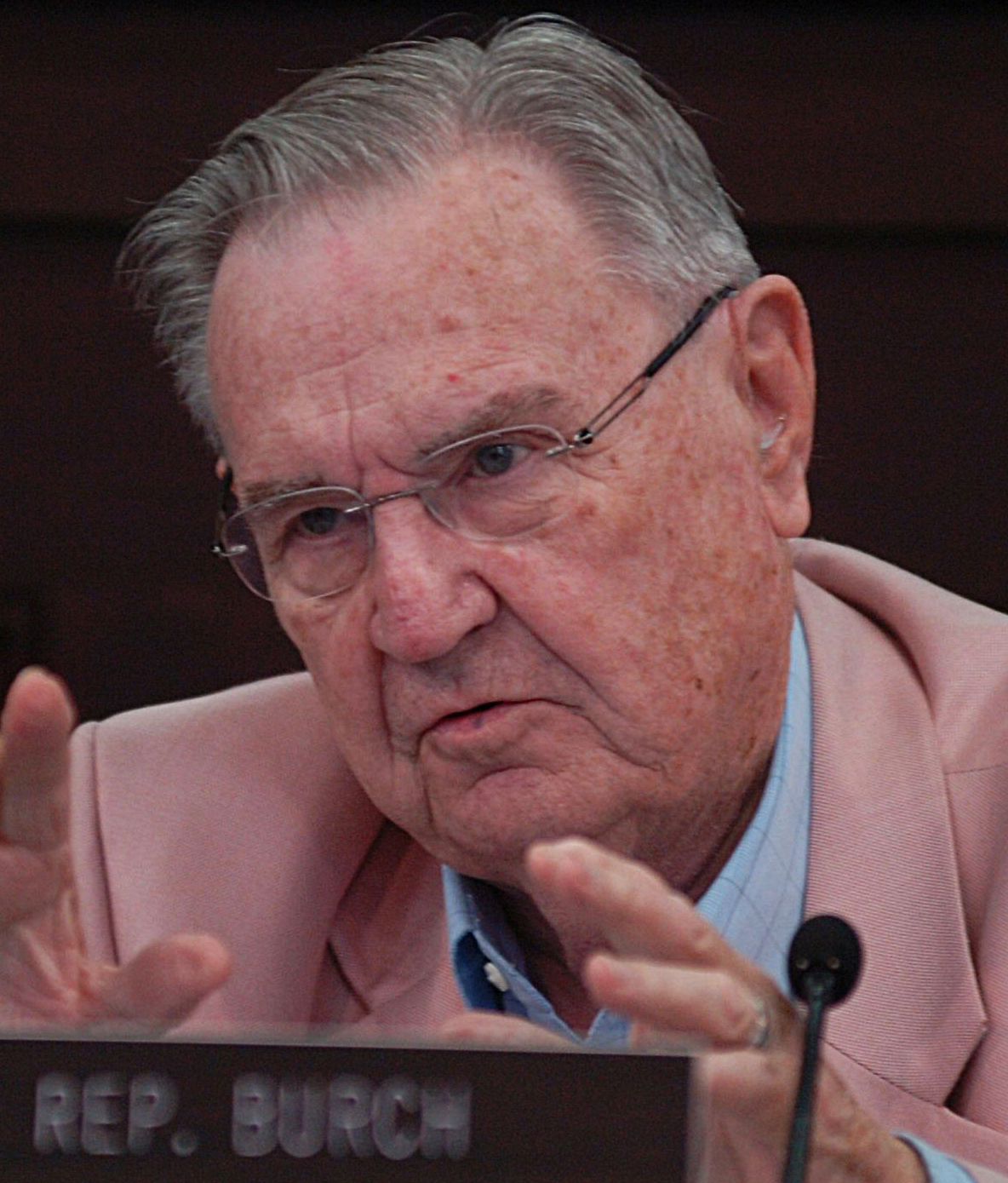
- Burch in 2019

Member of the Kentucky House of Representatives from the 30th district
- In office January 1, 1978 – January 1, 2023
- Preceded by: Jon Ackerson
- Succeeded by: Daniel Grossberg
- In office January 1, 1972 – January 1, 1976
- Preceded by: Joseph Keene (redistricting)
- Succeeded by: Jon Ackerson

Personal details
- Born: July 19, 1931 (age 95) Louisville, Kentucky, U.S.
- Party: Democratic
- Occupation: Production control manager (retired)

Military service
- Allegiance: United States
- Branch/service: United States Navy; United States Navy Reserve
- Years of service: 1948–1956

Thomas J. Burch (born July 19, 1931) is an American politician who served as a member of the Kentucky House of Representatives from 1978 to 2023. A member of the Democratic Party, Burch represented Kentucky's 30th House district, which comprised part of Jefferson County. He previously represented the same district from 1972 to 1976.

Elected to 24 two-year terms, Burch's tenure of exactly 49 years is the longest of any member of the Kentucky General Assembly.

== Early life and education ==
Thomas J. Burch was born on July 19, 1931, in Louisville, Kentucky. Burch spent his career working for General Electric from 1953 until his retirement in 1991 as a production control manager. During this time, Burch attended Bellarmine College, graduating with a degree in business in 1959.

Burch served in the United States Navy and United States Naval Reserve from 1948 to 1956.

== Political career ==
In 1969, Burch unsuccessfully ran for the Kentucky Senate, losing to incumbent Republican senator Walter Reichert. He was elected to the Kentucky House of Representatives initially in 1971, serving two terms. He was defeated for reelection by Republican Jon Ackerson in 1975. He was elected again in 1977 when Ackerson retired to run for the Kentucky Senate.

A Catholic by religion, Burch is married to Patty McDevitt and has five children and resides in Louisville. He is a member a board member of Brooklawn Youth Services, and a member of the Home of the Innocents, Kentucky Domestic Violence Association, Kentucky Organ Donor Council, Kentucky Welfare Reform Coalition, Kosair Children's Hospital, Lions Foundation, and the National Organization for Women.

In 2010, Burch released a statement regarding alleged sexual abuse he experienced as a youth by a Catholic priest.

In 2022, Burch was defeated by Daniel Grossberg in the Democratic primary election.

== Electoral history ==
Electoral history of Kevin Kiley
Year	Office	Primary			General			Result	Swing	Ref.
Year	Office	Total	%	P.	Total	%	P.	Result	Swing	Ref.
1967	Kentucky House of Representatives (46th)	Unopposed			5,525	43.91%	2nd	Lost	Hold	
1969	Kentucky Senate (34th)	2,434	68.68%	1st	16,181	48.80%	2nd	Lost	Hold	
1971	Kentucky House of Representatives (30th)	826	44.17%	1st	3,771	55.59%	1st	Won	Hold	
1973	Kentucky House of Representatives (30th)	Unopposed			4,982	66.80%	1st	Won	Hold	
1975	Kentucky House of Representatives (30th)	Unopposed			3,172	43.90%	2nd	Lost	Gain	
1977	Kentucky House of Representatives (30th)	1,222	60.02%	1st	4,741	66.28%	1st	Won	Gain	
1979	Kentucky House of Representatives (30th)	Unopposed			5,076	70.15%	1st	Won	Hold	
1981	Kentucky House of Representatives (30th)	1,280	57.71%	1st	4,922	64.74%	1st	Won	Hold	
1984	Kentucky House of Representatives (30th)	1,078	62.17%	1st	8,299	63.86%	1st	Won	Hold	
1986	Kentucky House of Representatives (30th)	1,157	79.52%	1st	4,617	71.98%	1st	Won	Hold	
1988	Kentucky House of Representatives (30th)	Unopposed			8,701	Unopposed		Won	Hold	
1990	Kentucky House of Representatives (30th)	Unopposed			4,456	51.98%	1st	Won	Hold	
1992	Kentucky House of Representatives (30th)	2,373	53.31%	1st	7,919	53.25%	1st	Won	Hold	
1994	Kentucky House of Representatives (30th)	Unopposed			4,417	53.47%	1st	Won	Hold	
1996	Kentucky House of Representatives (30th)	Unopposed			9,218	72.12%	1st	Won	Hold	
1998	Kentucky House of Representatives (30th)	Unopposed			7,164	73.61%	1st	Won	Hold	
2000	Kentucky House of Representatives (30th)	1,549	62.71%	1st	10,354	Unopposed		Won	Hold	
2002	Kentucky House of Representatives (30th)	Unopposed			9,376	Unopposed		Won	Hold	
2004	Kentucky House of Representatives (30th)	Unopposed			12,384	70.28%	1st	Won	Hold	
2006	Kentucky House of Representatives (30th)	Unopposed			9,138	74.20%	1st	Won	Hold	
2008	Kentucky House of Representatives (30th)	Unopposed			15,653	Unopposed		Won	Hold	
2010	Kentucky House of Representatives (30th)	Unopposed			9,433	72.38%	1st	Won	Hold	
2012	Kentucky House of Representatives (30th)	Unopposed			13,345	75.08%	1st	Won	Hold	
2014	Kentucky House of Representatives (30th)	Unopposed			9,647	Unopposed		Won	Hold	
2016	Kentucky House of Representatives (30th)	Unopposed			12,678	76.79%	1st	Won	Hold	
2018	Kentucky House of Representatives (30th)	2,179	55.76%	1st	9,935	75.51%	1st	Won	Hold	
2020	Kentucky House of Representatives (30th)	4,692	58.78%	1st	14,521	Unopposed		Won	Hold	
2022	Kentucky House of Representatives (30th)	1,719	41.98%	2nd	Did not advance			Lost	Hold	
