= Joseph Redmon =

American politician

Member-elect of the Kentucky House of Representatives from the 27th district
- Assuming office January 1, 2027
- Succeeding: Nancy Tate

Personal details
- Party: Republican
- Website: joeredmon.com

Joseph Redmon is an American politician who is the member-elect for the 27th district of the Kentucky House of Representatives. He was elected at the 2026 election.
