= Kim Banta =

American politician

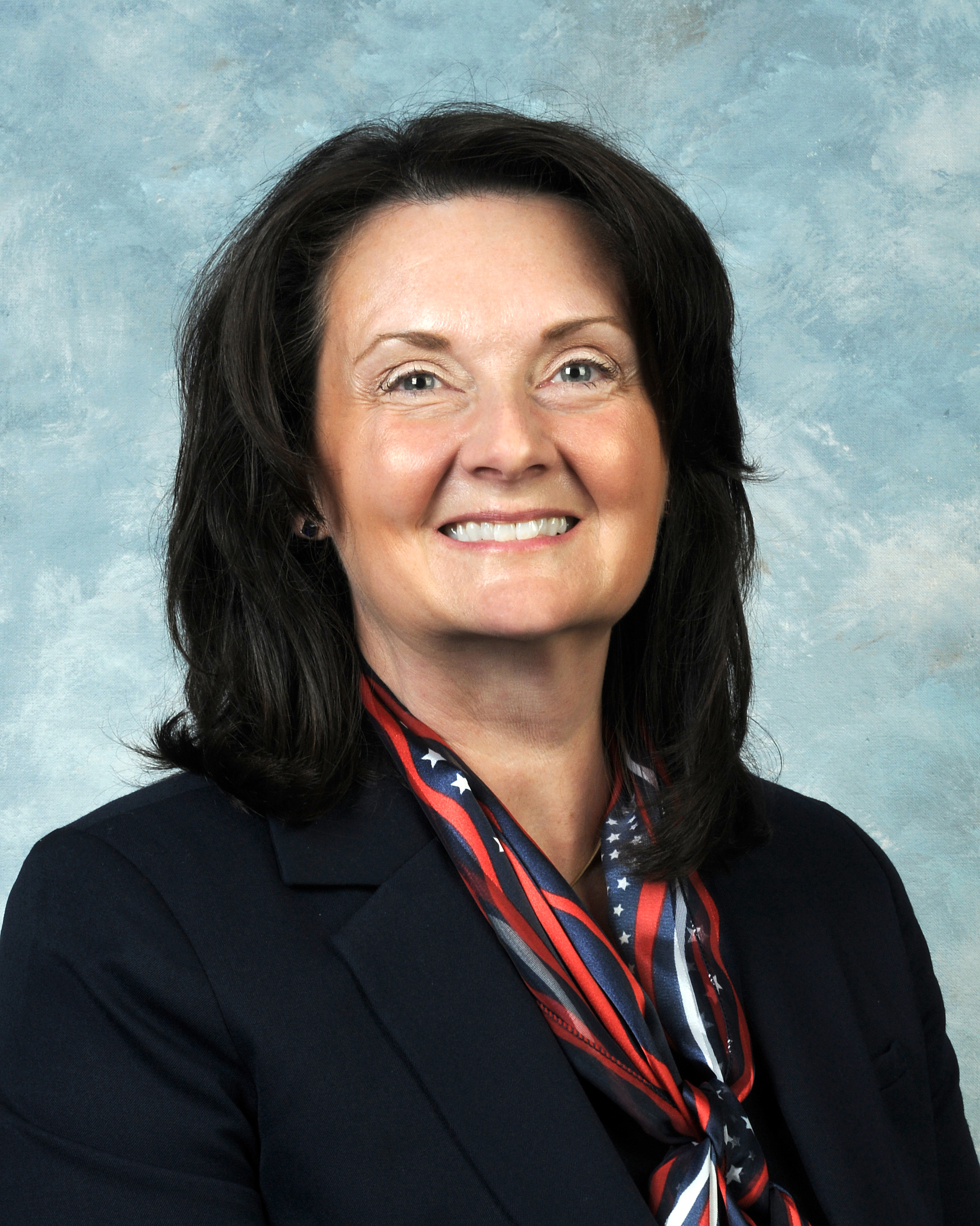

Member of the Kentucky House of Representatives from the 63rd district
- Incumbent
- Assumed office November 22, 2019
- Preceded by: Diane St. Onge

Personal details
- Born: January 17, 1964 (age 62)
- Party: Republican
- Children: 3
- Committees: Appropriations & Revenue; Licensing, Occupations, & Administrative Regulations; Judiciary

Kimberly A. Banta (born January 17, 1964) is an American politician and Republican member of the Kentucky House of Representatives from Kentucky's 63rd House district. Her district includes parts of Boone and Kenton counties. Banta was defeated for renomination by Cole Cuzick in the 2026 Kentucky House of Representatives election.

== Early life ==
Banta was born on January 17, 1964. She earned a Bachelor of Science from Indiana University Bloomington before earning her Doctor of Education from the University of Louisville.

For the entirety of her career, Banta was employed in the education field. She began as a teacher at Simon Kenton High School before becoming the assistant principal and then principal of Dixie Heights High School. She would retire in 2019 as the assistant superintendent and chief academic officer of Kenton County Schools.

== Political career ==
=== Elections ===
- 2019 Governor Matt Bevin called for a special election to be held on November 5, 2019, following the resignation of incumbent representative Diane St. Onge. Banta won the 2019 Kentucky House of Representatives special election with 10,921 votes (63.1%) against Democratic candidate Josh Blair.
- 2020 Banta was unopposed in the 2020 Republican primary and won the 2020 Kentucky House of Representatives election with 17,344 votes (67.7%) against Democratic candidate Ashley Williams.
- 2022 Banta was unopposed in both the 2022 Republican primary and 2022 Kentucky House of Representatives election, winning the latter with 9,359 votes.
- 2024 Banta was unopposed in both the 2024 Republican primary and 2024 Kentucky House of Representatives election, winning the latter with 14,325 votes.
- 2026 Banta was defeated in the 2026 Republican primary by a margin of 13 votes, garnering 2,207 votes (45.4%) against Cole Cuzick and Seth Winslow Young.

== Personal life ==
Banta identifies as a Catholic.
