= William Lawrence (Kentucky politician) =

American politician

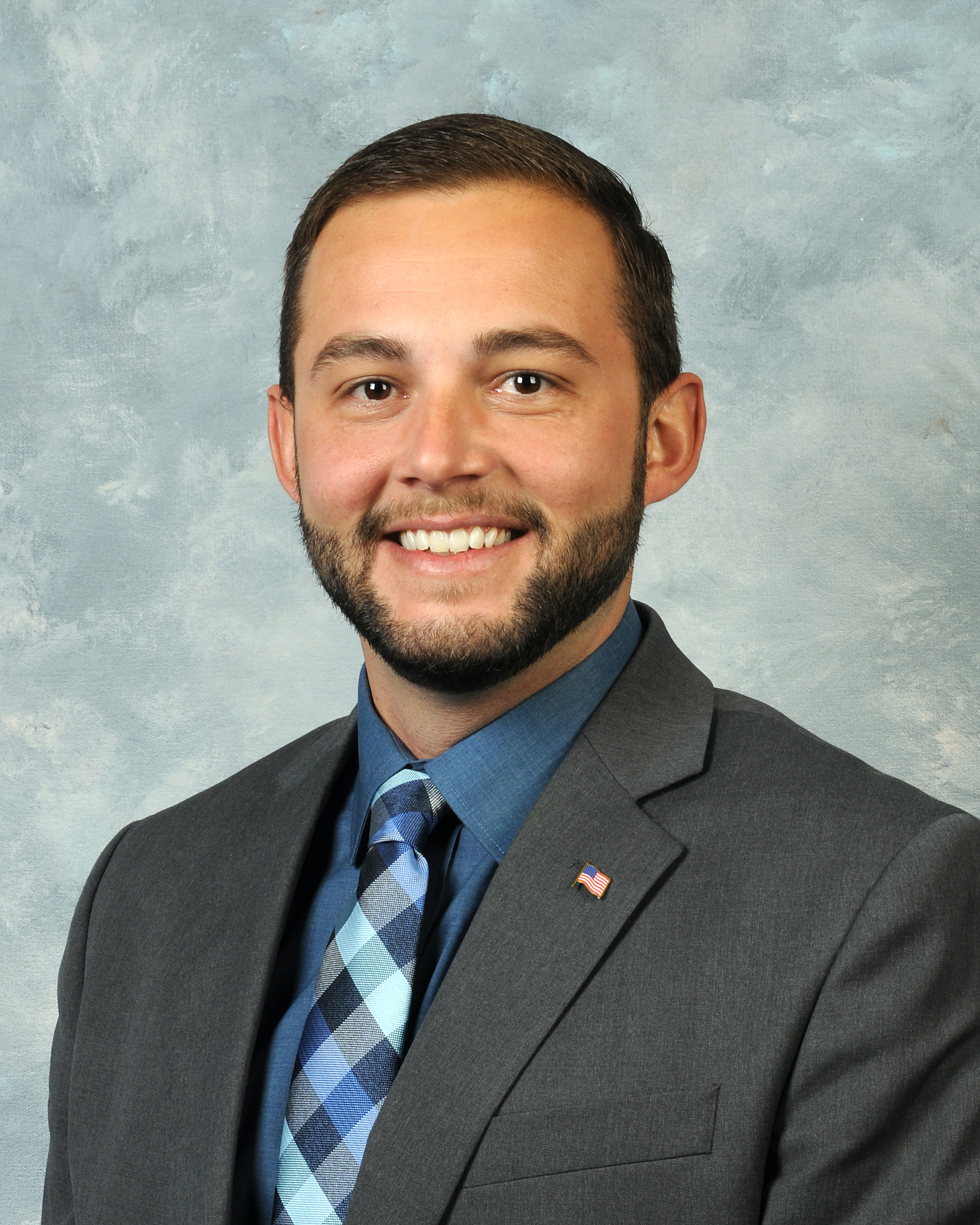

Member of the Kentucky House of Representatives from the 70th district
- Incumbent
- Assumed office January 1, 2021
- Preceded by: John Sims Jr.
- Succeeded by: Mike Fisher (elect)

Personal details
- Born: William Lee Lawrence; January 19, 1989 (age 37)
- Party: Republican
- Children: 3
- Education: Maysville Community and Technical College (AAS)
- Committees: Small Business & Information Technology (Vice Chair); Economic Development & Workforce Investment; Tourism & Outdoor Recreation

William Lee Lawrence (born January 19, 1989) is an American politician and businessman serving as a Republican member of the Kentucky House of Representatives from Kentucky's 70th House district. His district is composed of Bracken, Harrison, Mason, and Robertson counties.

He did not seek reelection to the house in 2026, instead running to be a commissioner on the Mason County Fiscal Court.

== Background ==
Lawrence attended Tolleboro Christian School before earning an Associate of Applied Science in industrial maintenance from Maysville Community and Technical College. Since 2015, Lawrence has operated Lawrence Development and Rental Properties.

Outside of business, Lawrence is a member of Lions Club International and Kiwanis International.

== Political career ==
=== Elections ===
- 2020 Incumbent representative of Kentucky's 70th House district, John Sims Jr, chose not to seek reelection in order to run for Judge Executive of Fleming County. Lawrence won the 2020 Republican primary with 2,010 votes (56.6%) and won the 2020 Kentucky House of Representatives election with 12,999 votes (64.6%) against Democratic candidate Craig Miller.
- 2022 Lawrence was unopposed in the 2022 Republican primary and won the 2022 Kentucky House of Representatives election with 10,890 votes (65.4%) against Democratic candidate Meagan Brannon.
- 2024 Lawrence was unopposed in both the 2024 Republican primary and the 2024 Kentucky House of Representatives election, winning the latter with 17,507 votes.
