= 2019 Kentucky General Assembly =

2019 session of the Kentucky General Assembly
←	2018	2020	→
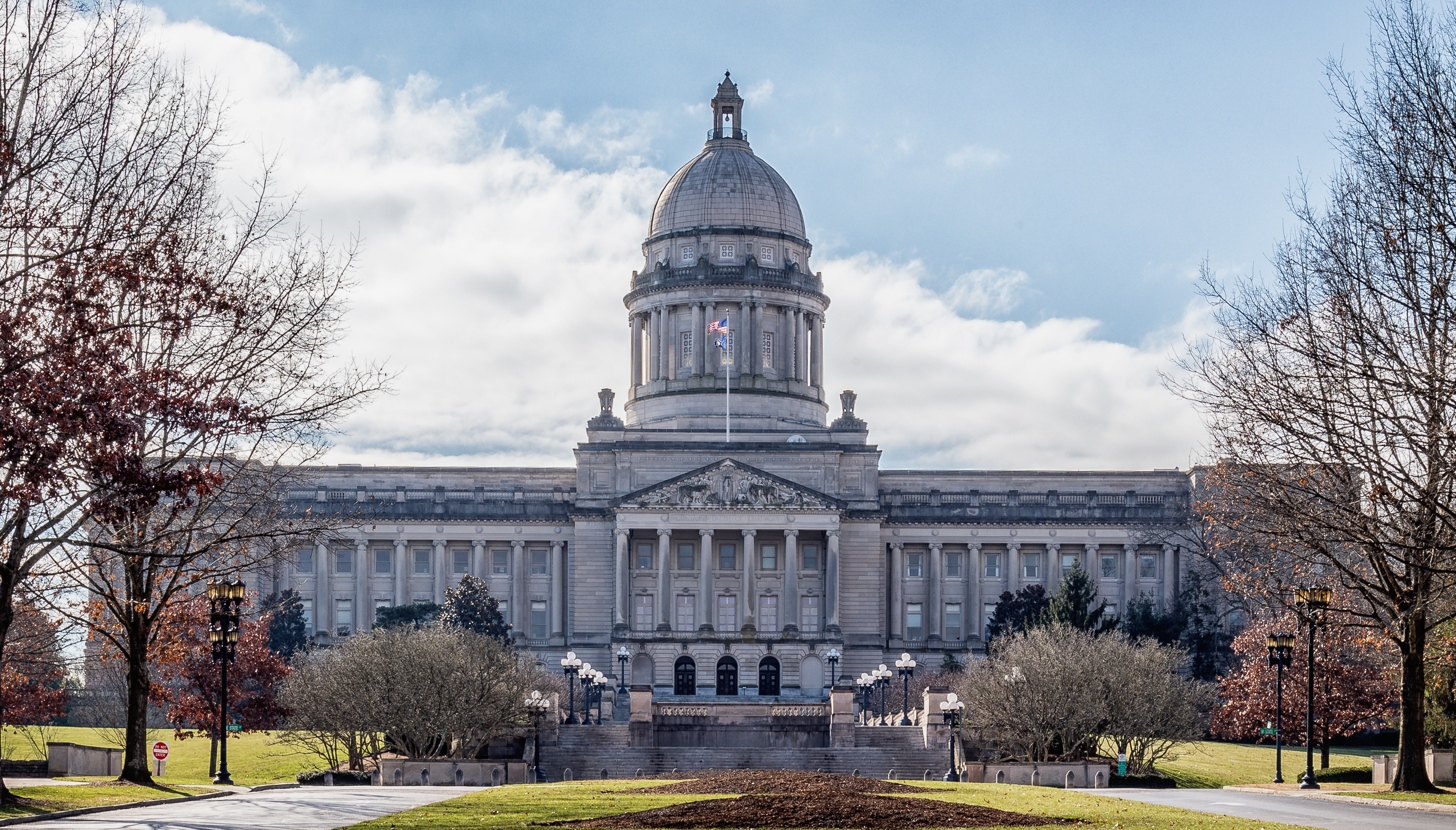
- The Kentucky State Capitol in 2016

Overview
- Legislative body: Kentucky General Assembly
- Jurisdiction: Kentucky

Senate
- Members: 38
- President: Robert Stivers (R–25th); Jan. 8, 2013 - present
- Majority leader: Damon Thayer (R–17th); Jan. 8, 2013 - Jan. 1, 2025
- Minority Leader: Morgan McGarvey (D–19th); Jan. 8, 2019 - Jan. 2, 2023
- Party control: Republican

House of Representatives
- Members: 100
- Speaker: David Osborne (R–59th); Jan. 8, 2019 - present
- Minority Leader: Rocky Adkins (D–99th); Jan. 3, 2017 - Dec. 10, 2019
- Party control: Republican

Sessions
- Regular: January 8, 2019 – March 28, 2019
- Extra.: July 19, 2019 – July 24, 2019

The 2019 Kentucky General Assembly was a meeting of the Kentucky General Assembly, composed of the Kentucky Senate and the Kentucky House of Representatives. It convened in Frankfort on January 8, 2019, and adjourned sine die on March 28, 2019. It was the fourth and last regular session of the legislature during the tenure of governor Matt Bevin. The legislature convened again in July 2019 for an extraordinary session.

Republicans maintained their majorities in both chambers following the 2018 elections for the senate and the house.

== Party summary ==
=== Senate ===
Overview of Senate membership by party
	Party (shading shows control)		Total	Vacant
	Democratic	Republican	Total	Vacant
End of previous session	11	27	38	0
Begin (January 8, 2019)	9	28	37	1
March 19, 2019	9	29	38	0
Final voting share	23.7%	76.3%		
Extra. session	9	29	38	0
Beginning of the next session	9	28	37	1

=== House of Representatives ===
Overview of House membership by party
	Party (shading shows control)		Total	Vacant
	Democratic	Republican	Total	Vacant
End of previous session	37	63	100	0
Begin (January 8, 2019)	39	61	100	0
Final voting share	39.0%	61.0%		
Extra. session	39	61	100	0
Beginning of the next session	37	61	98	2

== Leadership ==
=== Senate ===
==== Presiding ====
- President: Robert Stivers (R)
- President pro tempore: David P. Givens (R)

==== Majority (Republican) ====
- Majority Leader: Damon Thayer
- Majority Whip: Mike Wilson
- Majority Caucus Chair: Julie Raque Adams

==== Minority (Democratic) ====
- Minority Leader: Morgan McGarvey
- Minority Whip: Dennis Parrett
- Minority Caucus Chair: Johnny Ray Turner

=== House of Representatives ===
==== Presiding ====
- Speaker: David Osborne (R)
- Speaker pro tempore: David Meade (R)

==== Majority (Republican) ====
- Majority Leader: John Carney
- Majority Whip: Chad McCoy
- Majority Caucus Chair: Suzanne Miles

==== Minority (Democratic) ====
- Minority Leader: Rocky Adkins
- Minority Whip: Joni Jenkins
- Minority Caucus Chair: Derrick Graham

== Extraordinary session ==
The legislature was convened by governor Matt Bevin from July 19 to 24 to address increases in pension costs to regional universities and other agencies partially funded by the state. Bevin called the session after vetoing the plan passed by the legislature during the regular session.

== Members ==
=== Senate ===
Senators in odd-numbered districts were elected in 2016, while senators in even-numbered districts were elected in 2018.

▌1. Stanley H. Humphries (R)
▌2. Danny Carroll (R)
▌3. Whitney Westerfield (R)
▌4. Robby Mills (R)
▌5. Stephen Meredith (R)
▌6. C. B. Embry (R)
▌7. Julian Carroll (D)
▌8. Matt Castlen (R)
▌9. David P. Givens (R)
▌10. Dennis Parrett (D)
▌11. John Schickel (R)
▌12. Alice Forgy Kerr (R)
▌13. Reggie Thomas (D)
▌14. Jimmy Higdon (R)
▌15. Rick Girdler (R)
▌16. Max Wise (R)
▌17. Damon Thayer (R)
▌18. Robin L. Webb (D)
▌19. Morgan McGarvey (D)

▌20. Paul Hornback (R)
▌21. Albert Robinson (R)
▌22. Tom Buford (R)
▌23. Christian McDaniel (R)
▌24. Wil Schroder (R)
▌25. Robert Stivers (R)
▌26. Ernie Harris (R)
▌27. Steve West (R)
▌28. Ralph Alvarado (R)
▌29. Johnny Ray Turner (D)
▌30. Brandon Smith (R)
▌31. Phillip Wheeler (R) (after March 19)
▌32. Mike Wilson (R)
▌33. Gerald Neal (D)
▌34. Jared Carpenter (R)
▌35. Denise Harper Angel (D)
▌36. Julie Raque Adams (R)
▌37. Perry B. Clark (D)
▌38. Dan Seum (R)

Senate composition by district Held by Democrats Held by Republicans

=== House of Representatives ===
All 100 house districts were last up for election in 2018.

▌1. Steven Rudy (R)
▌2. Richard Heath (R)
▌3. Randy Bridges (R)
▌4. Lynn Bechler (R)
▌5. Larry Elkins (R)
▌6. Chris Freeland (R)
▌7. Suzanne Miles (R)
▌8. Walker Thomas (R)
▌9. Myron Dossett (R)
▌10. Dean Schamore (D)
▌11. Rob Wiederstein (D)
▌12. Jim Gooch Jr. (R)
▌13. Jim Glenn (D)
▌14. Scott Lewis (R)
▌15. Melinda Gibbons Prunty (R)
▌16. Jason Petrie (R)
▌17. Steve Sheldon (R)
▌18. Tim Moore (R)
▌19. Michael Meredith (R)
▌20. Patti Minter (D)
▌21. Bart Rowland (R)
▌22. Wilson Stone (D)
▌23. Steve Riley (R)
▌24. Brandon Reed (R)
▌25. Jim DuPlessis (R)
▌26. Russell Webber (R)
▌27. Nancy Tate (R)
▌28. Charles Miller (D)
▌29. Kevin Bratcher (R)
▌30. Tom Burch (D)
▌31. Josie Raymond (D)
▌32. Tina Bojanowski (D)
▌33. Jason Nemes (R)
▌34. Mary Lou Marzian (D)
▌35. Lisa Willner (D)
▌36. Jerry T. Miller (R)
▌37. Jeffery Donohue (D)
▌38. McKenzie Cantrell (D)
▌39. Russ Meyer (D)
▌40. Nima Kulkarni (D)
▌41. Attica Scott (D)
▌42. Reginald Meeks (D)
▌43. Charles Booker (D)
▌44. Joni Jenkins (D)
▌45. Stan Lee (R)
▌46. Al Gentry (D)
▌47. Rick Rand (D)
▌48. Maria Sorolis (D)
▌49. Thomas Huff (R)
▌50. Chad McCoy (R)

▌51. John Carney (R)
▌52. Ken Upchurch (R)
▌53. James Tipton (R)
▌54. Daniel Elliott (R)
▌55. Kim King (R)
▌56. Joe Graviss (D)
▌57. Derrick Graham (D)
▌58. Rob Rothenburger (R)
▌59. David Osborne (R)
▌60. Sal Santoro (R)
▌61. Savannah Maddox (R)
▌62. Phillip Pratt (R)
▌63. Diane St. Onge (R)
▌64. Kimberly Poore Moser (R)
▌65. Buddy Wheatley (D)
▌66. C. Ed Massey (R)
▌67. Dennis Keene (D)
▌68. Joseph Fischer (R)
▌69. Adam Koenig (R)
▌70. John Sims Jr. (D)
▌71. Travis Brenda (R)
▌72. Matthew Koch (R)
▌73. Les Yates (R)
▌74. David Hale (R)
▌75. Kelly Flood (D)
▌76. Ruth Ann Palumbo (D)
▌77. George Brown Jr. (D)
▌78. Mark Hart (R)
▌79. Susan Westrom (D)
▌80. David Meade (R)
▌81. Deanna Frazier (R)
▌82. Regina Bunch (R)
▌83. Jeff Hoover (R)
▌84. Chris Fugate (R)
▌85. Tommy Turner (R)
▌86. Jim Stewart (R)
▌87. Adam Bowling (R)
▌88. Cherlynn Stevenson (D)
▌89. Robert Goforth (R)
▌90. Derek Lewis (R)
▌91. Cluster Howard (D)
▌92. John Blanton (R)
▌93. Chris Harris (D)
▌94. Angie Hatton (D)
▌95. Ashley Tackett Laferty (D)
▌96. Kathy Hinkle (D)
▌97. Bobby McCool (R)
▌98. Danny Bentley (R)
▌99. Rocky Adkins (D)
▌100. Terri Branham Clark (D)

House composition by district Held by Democrats Held by Republicans

== Changes in membership ==
=== Senate changes ===
Senate changes
State (class)	Vacated by	Reason for change	Successor	Date of successor's formal installation (Note: When seated or oath administered, not necessarily when service began.)
31	Vacant	Incumbent Ray Jones II (D) resigned January 7, 2019, following his election as Judge/Executive of Pike County. A special election was held March 5, 2019.	Phillip Wheeler (R)	March 19, 2019

=== House of Representatives changes ===
There were no changes in House of Representatives membership during this session.

== Committees ==
=== Senate committees ===
Committee	Chair	Vice Chair
Agriculture	Paul Hornback	Matt Castlen
Appropriations and Revenue	Christian McDaniel	Stanley H. Humphries
Banking and Insurance	Jared Carpenter	Rick Girdler
Committee on Committees	Robert Stivers	none
Economic Development, Tourism, and Labor	Danny Carroll	Rick Girdler
Education	Max Wise	Steve West
Enrollment	Robby Mills	none
Health and Welfare	Ralph Alvarado	Stephen Meredith
Judiciary	Whitney Westerfield	Steve West
Licensing, Occupations, and Administrative Regulations	John Schickel	Paul Hornback
Natural Resources and Energy	Brandon Smith	Robby Mills
Rules	Robert Stivers	none
State and Local Government	Wil Schroder	Dan Seum
Transportation	Ernie Harris	Jimmy Higdon
Veterans, Military Affairs, and Public Protection	Albert Robinson	C. B. Embry

=== House of Representatives committees ===
Committee	Chair	Vice Chair(s)
Agriculture	Richard Heath	Mark Hart
Appropriations and Revenue	Steven Rudy	Phillip Pratt
Banking and Insurance	Bart Rowland	Joseph Fischer
Committee on Committees	David Osborne	David Meade
Economic Development and Workforce Investment	Russell Webber	Daniel Elliott
Education	Regina Bunch	Steve Riley
Elections, Const. Amendments, and Intergovermental Affairs	Kevin Bratcher	Scott Lewis
Enrollment	David Hale	John Carney
Health and Family Services	Kimberly Poore Moser	none
Judiciary	Jason Petrie	C. Ed Massey
Licensing, Occupations, and Administrative Regulations	Adam Koenig	Matthew Koch
Local Government	Michael Meredith	Rob Rothenburger
Natural Resources and Energy	Jim Gooch Jr.	Adam Bowling
Rules	David Osborne	John Carney
Small Business and Information Technology	Diane St. Onge	Les Yates
State Government	Jerry T. Miller	Kevin Bratcher and Steve Sheldon
Tourism and Outdoor Recreation	Tommy Turner	Chris Fugate
Transportation	Ken Upchurch	Walker Thomas
Veterans, Military Affairs, and Public Protection	Tim Moore	Les Yates

== See also ==
- 2018 Kentucky elections (elections leading to this session)
  - 2018 Kentucky Senate election
  - 2018 Kentucky House of Representatives election
- List of Kentucky General Assemblies
