= 2017 Kentucky General Assembly =

2017 session of the Kentucky General Assembly
| ← | 2016 | 2018 | → |
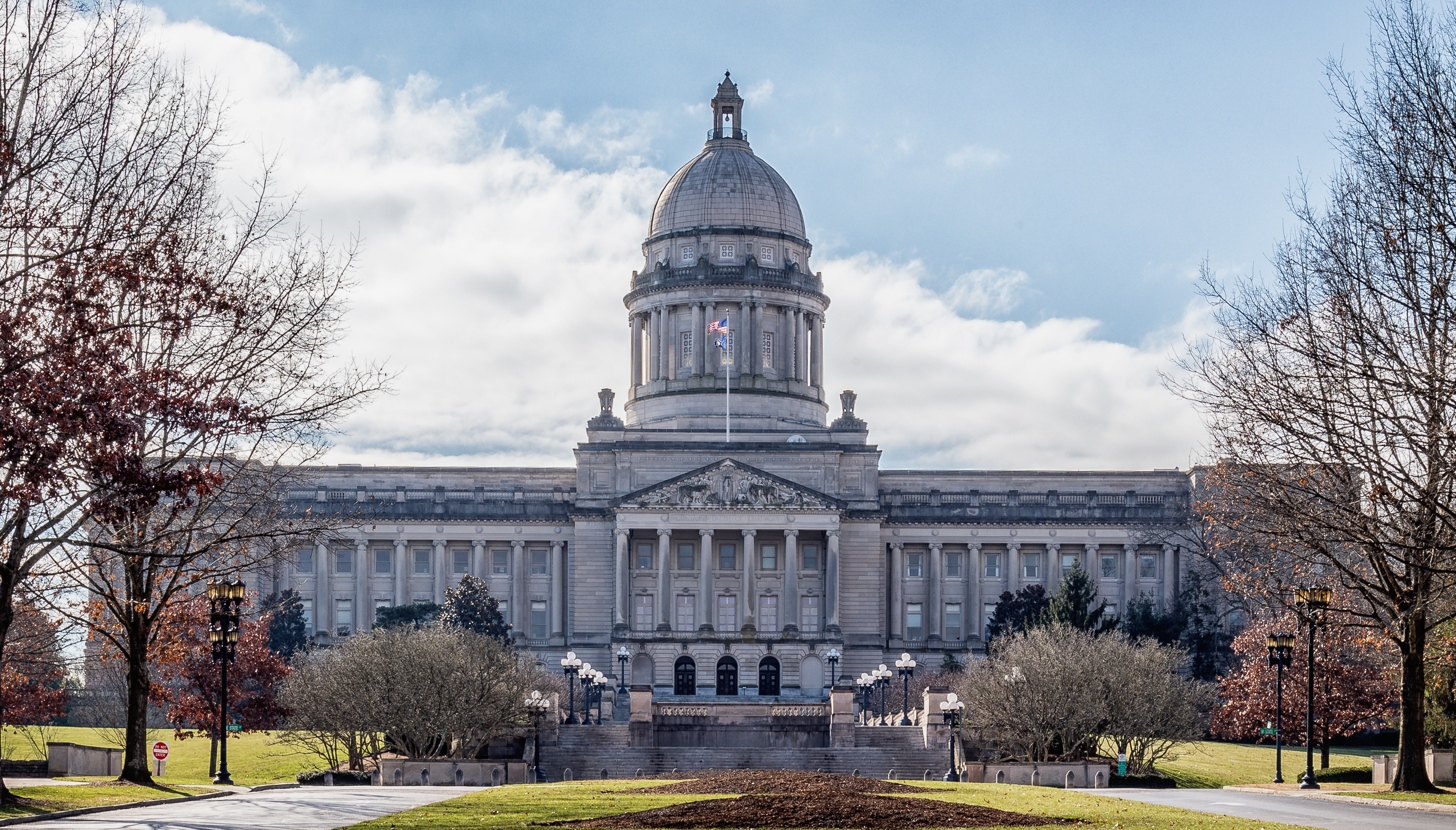
- The Kentucky State Capitol in 2016

Overview
- Legislative body: Kentucky General Assembly
- Jurisdiction: Kentucky
- Term: January 3, 2017 – March 30, 2017

Senate
- Members: 38
- President: Robert Stivers (R–25th); Jan. 8, 2013 - present
- Majority leader: Damon Thayer (R–17th); Jan. 8, 2013 - Jan. 1, 2025
- Minority Leader: Ray Jones II (D–19th); Jan. 6, 2015 - Jan. 7, 2019
- Party control: Republican

House of Representatives
- Members: 100
- Speaker: Jeff Hoover (R–83rd); Jan. 3, 2017 - January 8, 2018
- Minority Leader: Rocky Adkins (D–99th); Jan. 3, 2017 - Dec. 10, 2019
- Party control: Republican

The 2017 Kentucky General Assembly was a meeting of the Kentucky General Assembly, composed of the Kentucky Senate and the Kentucky House of Representatives. It convened in Frankfort on January 3, 2017, and adjourned sine die on March 30, 2017. It was the second regular session of the legislature during the tenure of governor Matt Bevin.

Republicans maintained their majority following the 2016 election for the senate, while flipping control of the house from the Democratic Party for the first time since the 1919 election. This was the first session with a Republican majority in the house of representatives since the 1920 session.

== Party summary ==
=== Senate ===
Overview of Senate membership by party
| | Party (shading shows control) | | Total | Vacant |
| | Democratic | Republican | Total | Vacant |
|---|---|---|---|---|
| End of previous session | 11 | 27 | 38 | 0 |
| Begin (January 3, 2017) | 11 | 27 | 38 | 0 |
| Final voting share | 28.9% | 71.1% | | |
| Beginning of the next session | 11 | 27 | 38 | 0 |

=== House of Representatives ===
Overview of House membership by party
| | Party (shading shows control) | | Total | Vacant |
| | Democratic | Republican | Total | Vacant |
|---|---|---|---|---|
| End of previous session | 53 | 47 | 100 | 0 |
| Begin (January 3, 2017) | 36 | 64 | 100 | 0 |
| Final voting share | 36.0% | 64.0% | | |
| Beginning of the next session | 36 | 62 | 98 | 2 |

== Leadership ==
=== Senate ===
==== Presiding ====
- President: Robert Stivers (R)
- President pro tempore: David P. Givens (R)

==== Majority (Republican) ====
- Majority Leader: Damon Thayer
- Majority Whip: Jimmy Higdon
- Majority Caucus Chair: Dan Seum

==== Minority (Democratic) ====
- Minority Leader: Ray Jones II
- Minority Whip: Julian Carroll
- Minority Caucus Chair: Dorsey Ridley

=== House of Representatives ===
==== Presiding ====
- Speaker: Jeff Hoover (R)
- Speaker pro tempore: David W. Osborne (R)

==== Majority (Republican) ====
- Majority Leader: Jonathan Shell
- Majority Whip: Kevin Bratcher
- Majority Caucus Chair: David Meade

==== Minority (Democratic) ====
- Minority Leader: Rocky Adkins
- Minority Whip: Wilson Stone
- Minority Caucus Chair: Dennis Keene

== Members ==
=== Senate ===
Senators in odd-numbered districts were elected in 2016, while senators in even-numbered districts were elected in 2014.

▌1. Stanley H. Humphries (R)
▌2. Danny Carroll (R)
▌3. Whitney Westerfield (R)
▌4. Dorsey Ridley (D)
▌5. Stephen Meredith (R)
▌6. C. B. Embry (R)
▌7. Julian Carroll (D)
▌8. Joseph R. Bowen (R)
▌9. David P. Givens (R)
▌10. Dennis Parrett (D)
▌11. John Schickel (R)
▌12. Alice Forgy Kerr (R)
▌13. Reggie Thomas (D)
▌14. Jimmy Higdon (R)
▌15. Rick Girdler (R)
▌16. Max Wise (R)
▌17. Damon Thayer (R)
▌18. Robin L. Webb (D)
▌19. Morgan McGarvey (D)

▌20. Paul Hornback (R)
▌21. Albert Robinson (R)
▌22. Tom Buford (R)
▌23. Christian McDaniel (R)
▌24. Wil Schroder (R)
▌25. Robert Stivers (R)
▌26. Ernie Harris (R)
▌27. Steve West (R)
▌28. Ralph Alvarado (R)
▌29. Johnny Ray Turner (D)
▌30. Brandon Smith (R)
▌31. Ray Jones II (D)
▌32. Mike Wilson (R)
▌33. Gerald Neal (D)
▌34. Jared Carpenter (R)
▌35. Denise Harper Angel (D)
▌36. Julie Raque Adams (R)
▌37. Perry B. Clark (D)
▌38. Dan Seum (R)

Senate composition by district Held by Democrats Held by Republicans

=== House of Representatives ===
All 100 house districts were last up for election in 2016.

▌1. Steven Rudy (R)
▌2. Richard Heath (R)
▌3. Gerald Watkins (D)
▌4. Lynn Bechler (R)
▌5. Kenny Imes (R)
▌6. Will Coursey (D)
▌7. Suzanne Miles (R)
▌8. Walker Thomas (R)
▌9. Myron Dossett (R)
▌10. Dean Schamore (D)
▌11. Robby Mills (R)
▌12. Jim Gooch Jr. (R)
▌13. DJ Johnson (R)
▌14. Matt Castlen (R)
▌15. Melinda Gibbons Prunty (R)
▌16. Jason Petrie (R)
▌17. Jim DeCesare (R)
▌18. Tim Moore (R)
▌19. Michael Meredith (R)
▌20. Jody Richards (D)
▌21. Bart Rowland (R)
▌22. Wilson Stone (D)
▌23. Steve Riley (R)
▌24. Brandon Reed (R)
▌25. Jim DuPlessis (R)
▌26. Russell Webber (R)
▌27. Jeff Greer (D)
▌28. Charles Miller (D)
▌29. Kevin Bratcher (R)
▌30. Tom Burch (D)
▌31. Steve Riggs (D)
▌32. Phil Moffett (R)
▌33. Jason Nemes (R)
▌34. Mary Lou Marzian (D)
▌35. Jim Wayne (D)
▌36. Jerry T. Miller (R)
▌37. Jeffery Donohue (D)
▌38. McKenzie Cantrell (D)
▌39. Russ Meyer (D)
▌40. Dennis Horlander (D)
▌41. Attica Scott (D)
▌42. Reginald Meeks (D)
▌43. Darryl Owens (D)
▌44. Joni Jenkins (D)
▌45. Stan Lee (R)
▌46. Al Gentry (D)
▌47. Rick Rand (D)
▌48. Ken Fleming (R)
▌49. Dan Johnson (R)
▌50. Chad McCoy (R)

▌51. John Carney (R)
▌52. Ken Upchurch (R)
▌53. James Tipton (R)
▌54. Daniel Elliott (R)
▌55. Kim King (R)
▌56. James Kay (D)
▌57. Derrick Graham (D)
▌58. Rob Rothenburger (R)
▌59. David W. Osborne (R)
▌60. Sal Santoro (R)
▌61. Brian Linder (R)
▌62. Phillip Pratt (R)
▌63. Diane St. Onge (R)
▌64. Kimberly Poore Moser (R)
▌65. Arnold Simpson (D)
▌66. Addia Wuchner (R)
▌67. Dennis Keene (D)
▌68. Joseph Fischer (R)
▌69. Adam Koenig (R)
▌70. John Sims Jr. (D)
▌71. Jonathan Shell (R)
▌72. Sannie Overly (D)
▌73. Donna Mayfield (R)
▌74. David Hale (R)
▌75. Kelly Flood (D)
▌76. Ruth Ann Palumbo (D)
▌77. George Brown Jr. (D)
▌78. Mark Hart (R)
▌79. Susan Westrom (D)
▌80. David Meade (R)
▌81. C. Wesley Morgan (R)
▌82. Regina Bunch (R)
▌83. Jeff Hoover (R)
▌84. Chris Fugate (R)
▌85. Tommy Turner (R)
▌86. Jim Stewart (R)
▌87. Rick Nelson (D)
▌88. Robert Benvenuti (R)
▌89. Marie Rader (R)
▌90. Tim Couch (R)
▌91. Toby Herald (R)
▌92. John Blanton (R)
▌93. Chris Harris (D)
▌94. Angie Hatton (D)
▌95. Larry D. Brown (R)
▌96. Jill York (R)
▌97. Scott Wells (R)
▌98. Danny Bentley (R)
▌99. Rocky Adkins (D)
▌100. Kevin Sinnette (D)

House composition by district Held by Democrats Held by Republicans

== Changes in membership ==
=== Senate changes ===
There were no changes in Senate membership during this session.

=== House of Representatives changes ===
There were no changes in House of Representatives membership during this session.

== Committees ==
=== Senate committees ===
| Committee | Chair | Vice Chair |
|---|---|---|
| Agriculture | Paul Hornback | Stephen West |
| Appropriations and Revenue | Christian McDaniel | Stanley H. Humphries |
| Banking and Insurance | Tom Buford | Jared Carpenter |
| Committee on Committees | Robert Stivers | none |
| Economic Development, Tourism, and Labor | Alice Forgy Kerr | Rick Girdler |
| Education | Mike Wilson | Max Wise |
| Enrollment | Max Wise | none |
| Health and Welfare | Julie Raque Adams | Ralph Alvarado |
| Judiciary | Whitney Westerfield | Wil Schroder |
| Licensing, Occupations, and Administrative Regulations | John Schickel | Paul Hornback |
| Natural Resources and Energy | Jared Carpenter | Brandon Smith |
| Rules | Robert Stivers | none |
| State and Local Government | Joseph Bowen | Stanley H. Humphries |
| Transportation | Ernie Harris | Brandon Smith |
| Veterans, Military Affairs, and Public Protection | Albert Robinson | C. B. Embry |

=== House of Representatives committees ===
| Committee | Chair | Vice Chair(s) |
|---|---|---|
| Agriculture | Richard Heath | Mark Hart |
| Appropriations and Revenue | Steven Rudy | Ken Fleming |
| Banking and Insurance | Bart Rowland | Scott Wells |
| Committee on Committees | Jeff Hoover | Jonathan Shell |
| Economic Development and Workforce Investment | Jim DeCesare | Phillip Pratt |
| Education | John Carney | Steve Riley |
| Elections, Const. Amendments, and Intergovermental Affairs | Kenny Imes | DJ Johnson |
| Enrollment | Donna Mayfield | none |
| Health and Family Services | Addia Wuchner | Melinda Gibbons Prunty |
| Judiciary | Joseph Fischer | Jason Petrie |
| Licensing, Occupations, and Administrative Regulations | Adam Koenig | Chad McCoy |
| Local Government | Michael Meredith | Rob Rothenburger |
| Natural Resources and Energy | Jim Gooch Jr. | Chris Fugate |
| Rules | Jeff Hoover | Jonathan Shell |
| Small Business and Information Technology | Diane St. Onge | Larry D. Brown |
| State Government | Jerry T. Miller | Kenny Imes |
| Tourism and Outdoor Recreation | Tommy Turner | David Hale |
| Transportation | Marie Rader | Robby Mills and Walker Thomas |
| Veterans, Military Affairs, and Public Protection | Tim Moore | Donna Mayfield |

== See also ==
- 2016 Kentucky elections (elections leading to this session)
  - 2016 Kentucky Senate election
  - 2016 Kentucky House of Representatives election
- List of Kentucky General Assemblies
