= 2018 Kentucky General Assembly =

2018 session of the Kentucky General Assembly
←	2017	2019	→
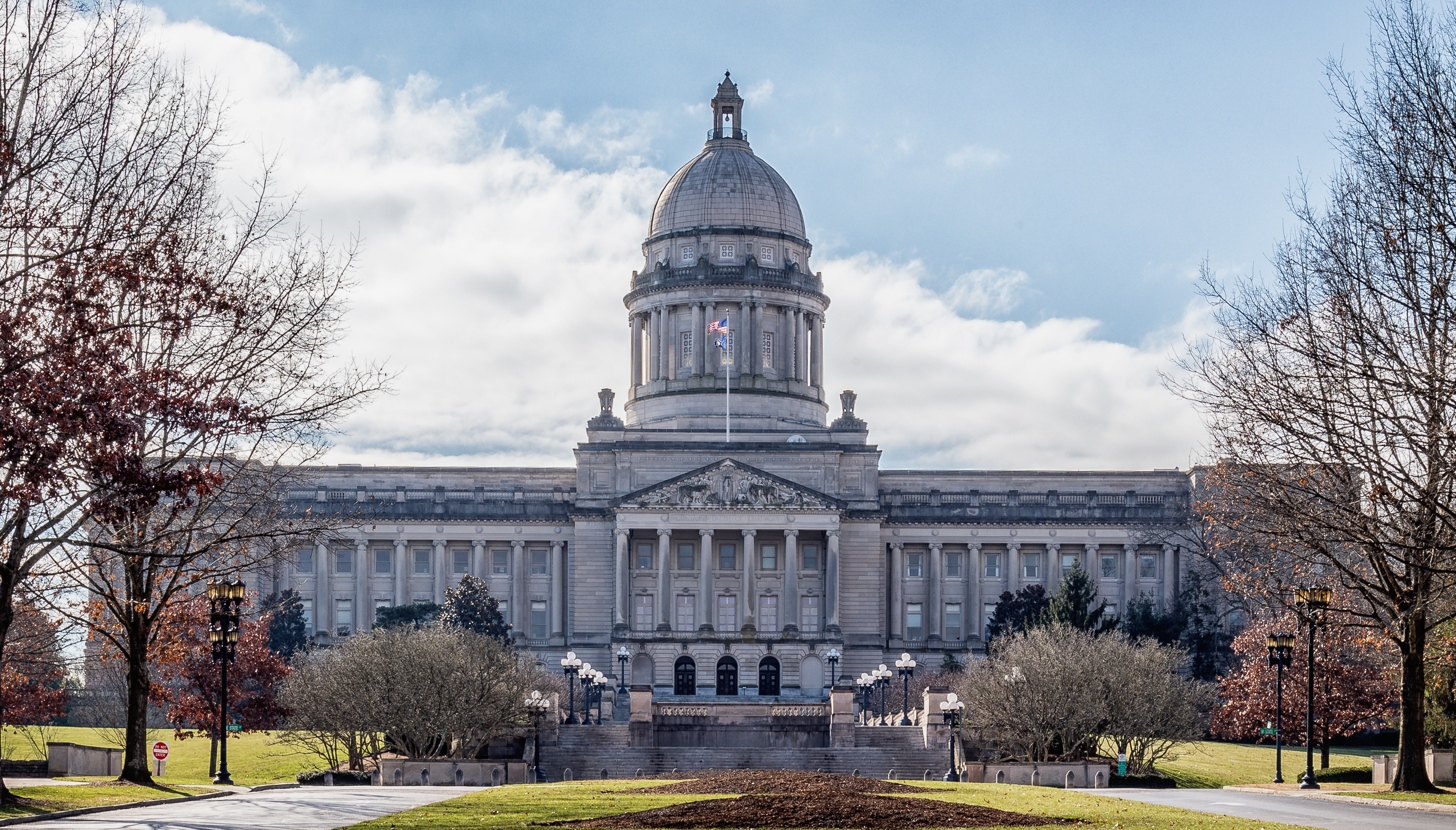
- The Kentucky State Capitol in 2016

Overview
- Legislative body: Kentucky General Assembly
- Jurisdiction: Kentucky

Senate
- Members: 38
- President: Robert Stivers (R–25th); Jan. 8, 2013 - present
- Majority leader: Damon Thayer (R–17th); Jan. 8, 2013 - Jan. 1, 2025
- Minority Leader: Ray Jones II (D–19th); Jan. 6, 2015 - Jan. 7, 2019
- Party control: Republican

House of Representatives
- Members: 100
- Speaker: Vacant
- Minority Leader: Rocky Adkins (D–99th); Jan. 3, 2017 - Dec. 10, 2019
- Party control: Republican

Sessions
- Regular: January 2, 2018 – April 14, 2018
- Extra.: December 17, 2018 – December 18, 2018

The 2018 Kentucky General Assembly was a meeting of the Kentucky General Assembly, composed of the Kentucky Senate and the Kentucky House of Representatives. It convened in Frankfort on January 2, 2018, and adjourned sine die on April 14, 2018. It was the third regular session of the legislature during the tenure of governor Matt Bevin. The legislature convened again in December 2018 for an extraordinary session.

Republicans maintained their majority following the 2016 election for the senate, while flipping control of the house from the Democratic Party for the first time since the 1919 election.

== Major legislation ==
=== Enacted ===
Senate bills

- SB 3: 2018 Kentucky Amendment 1: An act proposing to create a new section of the Constitution of Kentucky relating to crime victims' rights (Note: Amendments to the Constitution of Kentucky require a 3/5 majority in both houses of the legislature and a majority vote by referendum. They can not be vetoed by the governor.)

== Party summary ==
=== Senate ===
Overview of Senate membership by party
	Party (shading shows control)		Total	Vacant
	Democratic	Republican	Total	Vacant
End of previous session	11	27	38	0
Begin (January 2, 2018)	11	27	38	0
Final voting share	28.9%	71.1%		
Extra. session	11	27	38	0
Beginning of the next session	9	28	37	1

=== House of Representatives ===
Overview of House membership by party
	Party (shading shows control)		Total	Vacant
	Democratic	Republican	Total	Vacant
End of previous session	36	64	100	0
Begin (January 2, 2018)	36	62	98	2
February 27, 2018	37	62	99	1
March 6, 2018	37	63	100	0
Final voting share	37.0%	63.0%		
Extra. session	37	62	99	1
Beginning of the next session	39	61	100	0

== Leadership ==
=== Senate ===
==== Presiding ====
- President: Robert Stivers (R)
- President pro tempore: Jimmy Higdon (R)

==== Majority (Republican) ====
- Majority Leader: Damon Thayer
- Majority Whip: Mike Wilson
- Majority Caucus Chair: Dan Seum

==== Minority (Democratic) ====
- Minority Leader: Ray Jones II
- Minority Whip: Dennis Parrett
- Minority Caucus Chair: Dorsey Ridley

=== House of Representatives ===
==== Presiding ====
- Speaker: Vacant
- Speaker pro tempore: David W. Osborne (R)

==== Majority (Republican) ====
- Majority Leader: Jonathan Shell
- Majority Whip: Kevin Bratcher
- Majority Caucus Chair: David Meade

==== Minority (Democratic) ====
- Minority Leader: Rocky Adkins
- Minority Whip: Wilson Stone
- Minority Caucus Chair: Dennis Keene

== Extraordinary session ==
The legislature was convened by governor Matt Bevin from December 17 to 18 to address issues with the state's public pension system. The session adjourned immediately without considering any legislation.

== Members ==
=== Senate ===
Senators in odd-numbered districts were elected in 2016, while senators in even-numbered districts were elected in 2014.

▌1. Stanley H. Humphries (R)
▌2. Danny Carroll (R)
▌3. Whitney Westerfield (R)
▌4. Dorsey Ridley (D)
▌5. Stephen Meredith (R)
▌6. C. B. Embry (R)
▌7. Julian Carroll (D)
▌8. Joseph R. Bowen (R)
▌9. David P. Givens (R)
▌10. Dennis Parrett (D)
▌11. John Schickel (R)
▌12. Alice Forgy Kerr (R)
▌13. Reggie Thomas (D)
▌14. Jimmy Higdon (R)
▌15. Rick Girdler (R)
▌16. Max Wise (R)
▌17. Damon Thayer (R)
▌18. Robin L. Webb (D)
▌19. Morgan McGarvey (D)

▌20. Paul Hornback (R)
▌21. Albert Robinson (R)
▌22. Tom Buford (R)
▌23. Christian McDaniel (R)
▌24. Wil Schroder (R)
▌25. Robert Stivers (R)
▌26. Ernie Harris (R)
▌27. Steve West (R)
▌28. Ralph Alvarado (R)
▌29. Johnny Ray Turner (D)
▌30. Brandon Smith (R)
▌31. Ray Jones II (D)
▌32. Mike Wilson (R)
▌33. Gerald Neal (D)
▌34. Jared Carpenter (R)
▌35. Denise Harper Angel (D)
▌36. Julie Raque Adams (R)
▌37. Perry B. Clark (D)
▌38. Dan Seum (R)

Senate composition by district Held by Democrats Held by Republicans

=== House of Representatives ===
All 100 house districts were last up for election in 2016.

▌1. Steven Rudy (R)
▌2. Richard Heath (R)
▌3. Gerald Watkins (D)
▌4. Lynn Bechler (R)
▌5. Kenny Imes (R) (regular session)
▌6. Will Coursey (D)
▌7. Suzanne Miles (R)
▌8. Walker Thomas (R)
▌9. Myron Dossett (R)
▌10. Dean Schamore (D)
▌11. Robby Mills (R)
▌12. Jim Gooch Jr. (R)
▌13. DJ Johnson (R)
▌14. Matt Castlen (R)
▌15. Melinda Gibbons Prunty (R)
▌16. Jason Petrie (R)
▌17. Jim DeCesare (R)
▌18. Tim Moore (R)
▌19. Michael Meredith (R)
▌20. Jody Richards (D)
▌21. Bart Rowland (R)
▌22. Wilson Stone (D)
▌23. Steve Riley (R)
▌24. Brandon Reed (R)
▌25. Jim DuPlessis (R)
▌26. Russell Webber (R)
▌27. Jeff Greer (D)
▌28. Charles Miller (D)
▌29. Kevin Bratcher (R)
▌30. Tom Burch (D)
▌31. Steve Riggs (D)
▌32. Phil Moffett (R)
▌33. Jason Nemes (R)
▌34. Mary Lou Marzian (D)
▌35. Jim Wayne (D)
▌36. Jerry T. Miller (R)
▌37. Jeffery Donohue (D)
▌38. McKenzie Cantrell (D)
▌39. Russ Meyer (D)
▌40. Dennis Horlander (D)
▌41. Attica Scott (D)
▌42. Reginald Meeks (D)
▌43. Darryl Owens (D)
▌44. Joni Jenkins (D)
▌45. Stan Lee (R)
▌46. Al Gentry (D)
▌47. Rick Rand (D)
▌48. Ken Fleming (R)
▌49. Linda H. Belcher (D) (after February 27)
▌50. Chad McCoy (R)

▌51. John Carney (R)
▌52. Ken Upchurch (R)
▌53. James Tipton (R)
▌54. Daniel Elliott (R)
▌55. Kim King (R)
▌56. James Kay (D)
▌57. Derrick Graham (D)
▌58. Rob Rothenburger (R)
▌59. David W. Osborne (R)
▌60. Sal Santoro (R)
▌61. Brian Linder (R)
▌62. Phillip Pratt (R)
▌63. Diane St. Onge (R)
▌64. Kimberly Poore Moser (R)
▌65. Arnold Simpson (D)
▌66. Addia Wuchner (R)
▌67. Dennis Keene (D)
▌68. Joseph Fischer (R)
▌69. Adam Koenig (R)
▌70. John Sims Jr. (D)
▌71. Jonathan Shell (R)
▌72. Sannie Overly (D)
▌73. Donna Mayfield (R)
▌74. David Hale (R)
▌75. Kelly Flood (D)
▌76. Ruth Ann Palumbo (D)
▌77. George Brown Jr. (D)
▌78. Mark Hart (R)
▌79. Susan Westrom (D)
▌80. David Meade (R)
▌81. C. Wesley Morgan (R)
▌82. Regina Bunch (R)
▌83. Jeff Hoover (R)
▌84. Chris Fugate (R)
▌85. Tommy Turner (R)
▌86. Jim Stewart (R)
▌87. Rick Nelson (D)
▌88. Robert Benvenuti (R)
▌89. Robert Goforth (R) (after March 6)
▌90. Tim Couch (R)
▌91. Toby Herald (R)
▌92. John Blanton (R)
▌93. Chris Harris (D)
▌94. Angie Hatton (D)
▌95. Larry D. Brown (R)
▌96. Jill York (R)
▌97. Scott Wells (R)
▌98. Danny Bentley (R)
▌99. Rocky Adkins (D)
▌100. Kevin Sinnette (D)

House composition by district Held by Democrats Held by Republicans

== Changes in membership ==
=== Senate changes ===
There were no changes in Senate membership during this session.

=== House of Representatives changes ===
House changes
District	Vacated by	Reason for change	Successor	Date of successor's formal installation (Note: When seated or oath administered, not necessarily when service began.)
49	Vacant	Incumbent Dan Johnson (R) died December 13, 2017. A special election was held February 20, 2018.	Linda H. Belcher (D)	February 27, 2018
89	Vacant	Incumbent Marie Rader (R) resigned before the beginning of this session. A special election was held February 27, 2018.	Robert Goforth (R)	March 6, 2018
5	Kenny Imes (R)	Incumbent resigned October 1, 2018, to become Judge/Executive of Calloway County.	Vacant until the next session	

== Committees ==
=== Senate committees ===
Committee	Chair	Vice Chair
Agriculture	Paul Hornback	Stephen West
Appropriations and Revenue	Christian McDaniel	Stanley H. Humphries
Banking and Insurance	Tom Buford	Jared Carpenter
Committee on Committees	Robert Stivers	none
Economic Development, Tourism, and Labor	Alice Forgy Kerr	Rick Girdler
Education	Max Wise	Steve West
Enrollment	Wil Schroder	none
Health and Welfare	Julie Raque Adams	Ralph Alvarado
Judiciary	Whitney Westerfield	Wil Schroder
Licensing, Occupations, and Administrative Regulations	John Schickel	Paul Hornback
Natural Resources and Energy	Jared Carpenter	Brandon Smith
Rules	Robert Stivers	none
State and Local Government	Joseph Bowen	Stanley H. Humphries
Transportation	Ernie Harris	Brandon Smith
Veterans, Military Affairs, and Public Protection	Albert Robinson	C. B. Embry

=== House of Representatives committees ===
Committee	Chair	Vice Chair(s)
Agriculture	Richard Heath	Mark Hart
Appropriations and Revenue	Steven Rudy	Ken Fleming
Banking and Insurance	Bart Rowland	Scott Wells
Committee on Committees	none	Jonathan Shell
Economic Development and Workforce Investment	Phillip Pratt	Daniel Elliott
Education	John Carney	Steve Riley
Elections, Const. Amendments, and Intergovermental Affairs	Kenny Imes	DJ Johnson
Enrollment	Donna Mayfield	none
Health and Family Services	Addia Wuchner	Melinda Gibbons Prunty
Judiciary	Joseph Fischer	Jason Petrie
Licensing, Occupations, and Administrative Regulations	Adam Koenig	Chad McCoy
Local Government	Rob Rothenburger	DJ Johnson
Natural Resources and Energy	Jim Gooch Jr.	Chris Fugate
Rules	none	Jonathan Shell
Small Business and Information Technology	Diane St. Onge	Larry D. Brown
State Government	Jerry T. Miller	Kenny Imes
Tourism and Outdoor Recreation	Tommy Turner	David Hale
Transportation	Ken Upchurch	Robby Mills and Walker Thomas
Veterans, Military Affairs, and Public Protection	Tim Moore	Donna Mayfield

== See also ==
- 2016 Kentucky elections (elections leading to this session)
  - 2016 Kentucky Senate election
  - 2016 Kentucky House of Representatives election
- List of Kentucky General Assemblies
