= Jon Reinhardt =

American politician

Member of the Kentucky House of Representatives from the 69th district
- In office January 26, 1984 – January 1, 2007
- Preceded by: Art Schmidt
- Succeeded by: Adam Koenig

Personal details
- Born: April 1, 1943
- Died: January 9, 2020 (aged 76)
- Party: Republican

Jon David Reinhardt (April 1, 1943 – January 9, 2020) was an American politician from Kentucky who was a member of the Kentucky House of Representatives from 1984 to 2007. Reinhardt was first elected in a January 1984 special election after incumbent representative Art Schmidt resigned following his election to the Kentucky Senate. He did not seek reelection in 2006 and was succeeded by Adam Koenig.

Reinhardt died in January 2020.
