= Kentucky's 17th House of Representatives district =

American legislative district

Kentucky's 17th State House of Representatives district
Representative
Robert Duvall; R–Bowling Green
since January 1, 2023
- Registration: 46.3% Republican; 41.1% Democratic; 12.0% No party preference
- Demographics: 71.5% White; 9.1% Black; 9.6% Hispanic; 4.6% Asian; 0.1% Native American; 1.2% Hawaiian/Pacific Islander; 3.9% Multiracial
- Population (2023): 47,378
- Registered voters (2025): 32,693

Kentucky's 17th House of Representatives district is one of 100 districts in the Kentucky House of Representatives. Located in the western part of the state, it comprises part of Warren County. It has been represented by Robert Duvall (R–Bowling Green) since 2023. As of 2023, the district had a population of 47,378.

== Voter registration ==
On January 1, 2025, the district had 32,693 registered voters, who were registered with the following parties.

Party	Registration	
Party	Voters	%
Republican	15,121	46.25
Democratic	13,423	41.06
Independent	1,960	6.00
Libertarian	169	0.52
Green	33	0.10
Constitution	23	0.07
Socialist Workers	8	0.02
Reform	2	0.01
"Other"	1,954	5.98
Total	32,693	100.00
Source: Kentucky State Board of Elections

== List of members representing the district ==
Member	Party	Years	Electoral history	District location
Willard Allen (Morgantown)	Republican	January 1, 1974 – January 1, 2003	Elected in 1973. Reelected in 1975. Reelected in 1977. Reelected in 1979. Reelected in 1981. Reelected in 1984. Reelected in 1986. Reelected in 1988. Reelected in 1990. Reelected in 1992. Reelected in 1994. Reelected in 1996. Reelected in 1998. Reelected in 2000. Retired to run for Judge/Executive of Butler County.	1974–1985; Hancock, Ohio, and Butler (part) Counties.
Willard Allen (Morgantown)	Republican	January 1, 1974 – January 1, 2003	Elected in 1973. Reelected in 1975. Reelected in 1977. Reelected in 1979. Reelected in 1981. Reelected in 1984. Reelected in 1986. Reelected in 1988. Reelected in 1990. Reelected in 1992. Reelected in 1994. Reelected in 1996. Reelected in 1998. Reelected in 2000. Retired to run for Judge/Executive of Butler County.	1985–1993; Butler, Ohio, and Hancock (part) Counties.
Willard Allen (Morgantown)	Republican	January 1, 1974 – January 1, 2003	Elected in 1973. Reelected in 1975. Reelected in 1977. Reelected in 1979. Reelected in 1981. Reelected in 1984. Reelected in 1986. Reelected in 1988. Reelected in 1990. Reelected in 1992. Reelected in 1994. Reelected in 1996. Reelected in 1998. Reelected in 2000. Retired to run for Judge/Executive of Butler County.	1993–1997; Butler, Ohio, and Grayson (part) Counties.
Willard Allen (Morgantown)	Republican	January 1, 1974 – January 1, 2003	Elected in 1973. Reelected in 1975. Reelected in 1977. Reelected in 1979. Reelected in 1981. Reelected in 1984. Reelected in 1986. Reelected in 1988. Reelected in 1990. Reelected in 1992. Reelected in 1994. Reelected in 1996. Reelected in 1998. Reelected in 2000. Retired to run for Judge/Executive of Butler County.	1997–2003
C. B. Embry (Morgantown)	Republican	January 1, 2003 – January 1, 2015	Elected in 2002. Reelected in 2004. Reelected in 2006. Reelected in 2008. Reelected in 2010. Reelected in 2012. Retired to run for the Kentucky Senate.	2003–2015
Jim DeCesare (Bowling Green)	Republican	January 1, 2015 – January 1, 2019	Redistricted from the 21st district and reelected in 2014. Reelected in 2016. Retired.	2015–2023
Steve Sheldon (Bowling Green)	Republican	January 1, 2019 – January 1, 2023	Elected in 2018. Reelected in 2020. Retired.	2015–2023
Robert Duvall (Bowling Green)	Republican	January 1, 2023 – present	Elected in 2022. Reelected in 2024. Reelected in 2026.	2023–present
