= Kentucky's 22nd House of Representatives district =

American legislative district

Kentucky's 22nd State House of Representatives district
Representative
Shawn McPherson; R–Scottsville
since January 1, 2021
- Registration: 57.9% Republican; 31.9.% Democratic; 9.6% No party preference
- Demographics: 89.2% White; 3.8% Black; 2.7% Hispanic; 0.2% Asian; 0.1% Native American; 0.3% Other; 3.8% Multiracial
- Population (2023): 48,216
- Registered voters (2025): 36,461

Kentucky's 22nd House of Representatives district is one of 100 districts in the Kentucky House of Representatives. Located in the western part of the state, it comprises the counties of Allen, Simpson, and part of Warren. It has been represented by Shawn McPherson (R–Scottsville) since 2021. As of 2023, the district had a population of 48,216.

== Voter registration ==
On January 1, 2025, the district had 36,461 registered voters, who were registered with the following parties.

Party	Registration	
Party	Voters	%
Republican	21,108	57.89
Democratic	11,622	31.88
Independent	1,424	3.91
Libertarian	189	0.52
Green	26	0.07
Constitution	23	0.06
Socialist Workers	6	0.02
Reform	2	0.01
"Other"	2,061	5.65
Total	36,461	100.00
Source: Kentucky State Board of Elections

== List of members representing the district ==
Member	Party	Years	Electoral history	District location
Richard Turner (Tompkinsville)	Republican	January 1, 1980 – January 1, 1997	Elected in 1979. Reelected in 1981. Reelected in 1984. Reelected in 1986. Reelected in 1988. Reelected in 1990. Reelected in 1992. Reelected in 1994. Retired.	1974–1985; Allen, Monroe, and Simpson (part) Counties.
Richard Turner (Tompkinsville)	Republican	January 1, 1980 – January 1, 1997	Elected in 1979. Reelected in 1981. Reelected in 1984. Reelected in 1986. Reelected in 1988. Reelected in 1990. Reelected in 1992. Reelected in 1994. Retired.	1985–1993; Allen, Monroe, and Simpson (part) Counties.
Richard Turner (Tompkinsville)	Republican	January 1, 1980 – January 1, 1997	Elected in 1979. Reelected in 1981. Reelected in 1984. Reelected in 1986. Reelected in 1988. Reelected in 1990. Reelected in 1992. Reelected in 1994. Retired.	1993–1997; Allen, Monroe, and Simpson (part) Counties.
Rob Wilkey (Franklin)	Democratic	January 1, 1997 – January 1, 2009	Elected in 1996. Reelected in 1998. Reelected in 2000. Reelected in 2002. Reelected in 2004. Reelected in 2006. Retired.	1997–2003
Rob Wilkey (Franklin)	Democratic	January 1, 1997 – January 1, 2009	Elected in 1996. Reelected in 1998. Reelected in 2000. Reelected in 2002. Reelected in 2004. Reelected in 2006. Retired.	2003–2015
Wilson Stone (Scottsville)	Democratic	January 1, 2009 – January 1, 2021	Elected in 2008. Reelected in 2010. Reelected in 2012. Reelected in 2014. Reelected in 2016. Reelected in 2018. Retired.	2003–2015
Wilson Stone (Scottsville)	Democratic	January 1, 2009 – January 1, 2021	Elected in 2008. Reelected in 2010. Reelected in 2012. Reelected in 2014. Reelected in 2016. Reelected in 2018. Retired.	2015–2023
Shawn McPherson (Scottsville)	Republican	January 1, 2021 – present	Elected in 2020. Reelected in 2022. Reelected in 2024. Reelected in 2026.	2015–2023
Shawn McPherson (Scottsville)	Republican	January 1, 2021 – present	Elected in 2020. Reelected in 2022. Reelected in 2024. Reelected in 2026.	2023–present
