= T. J. Roberts (politician) =

American politician

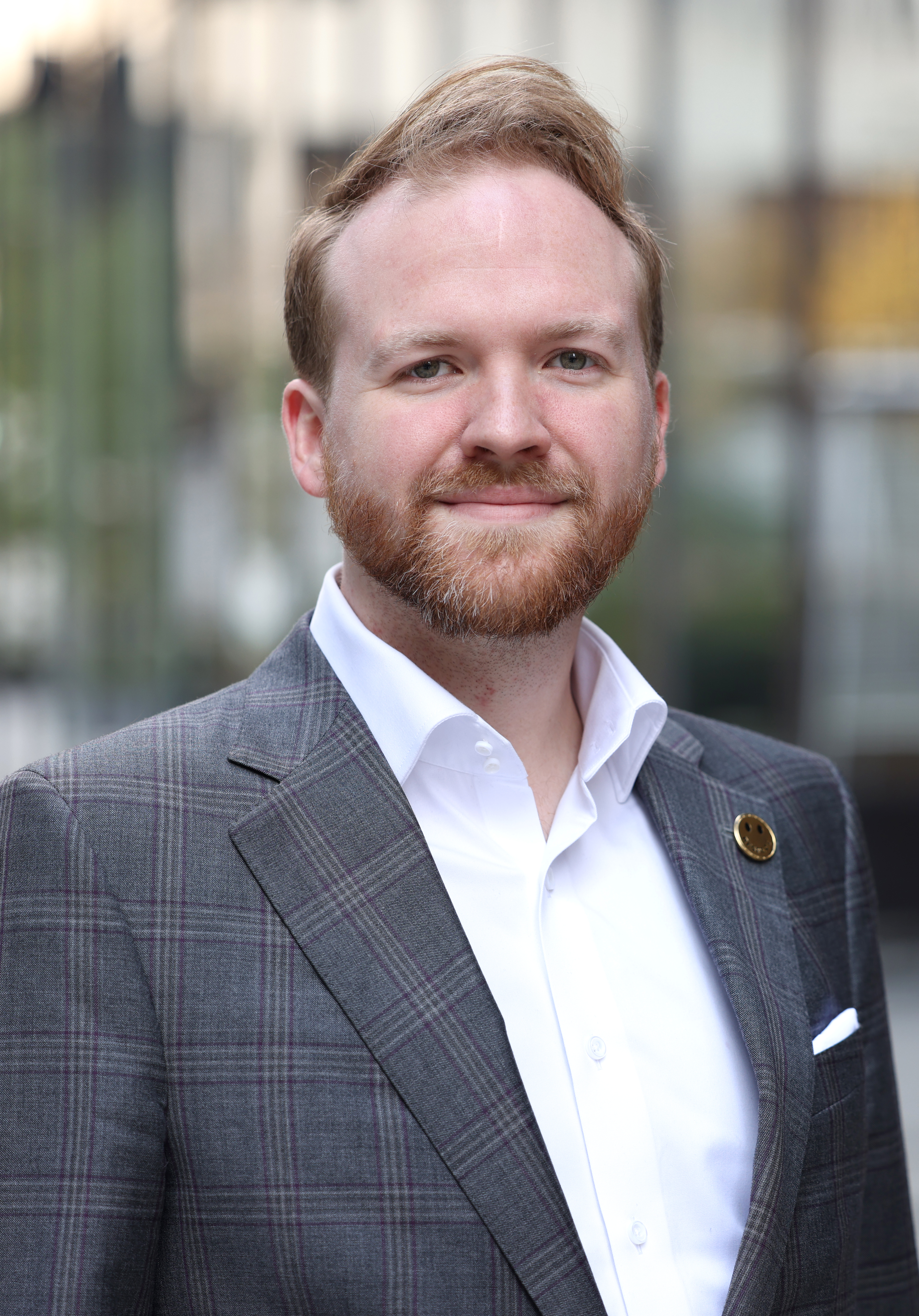
- Roberts in 2024

Member of the Kentucky House of Representatives from the 66th district
- Incumbent
- Assumed office January 1, 2025
- Preceded by: Steve Rawlings

Personal details
- Born: Theodore Joseph Roberts; February 23, 1998 (age 28) Boone County, Kentucky
- Party: Republican
- Education: Transylvania University (BA); Salmon P. Chase College of Law (JD)
- Occupation: Attorney

Theodore Joseph "T.J." Roberts (born February 23, 1998) is an American politician and constitutional attorney serving as a member of the Kentucky House of Representatives for the 66th district. A member of the Republican Party, he assumed office on January 1, 2025.

Roberts first gained prominence after successfully suing Kentucky Governor Andy Beshear over COVID-19 lockdown policies, which he argued violated constitutional rights. He is also known for his staunch support of President Donald Trump and his advocacy for increased immigration enforcement against illegal immigrants in Kentucky, individual liberties, and constitutional conservatism.

== Early life and education ==
Roberts was born in Edgewood, Kentucky, and graduated from Conner High School. He went on to earn a Bachelor of Arts from Transylvania University in 2019 and a Juris Doctor from the Salmon P. Chase College of Law in 2023.

== Political career ==
=== Early involvement ===
T.J. Roberts became politically active at a young age through the Tea Party Movement, and during the 2016 presidential election, engaged in door-to-door advocacy for then-candidate Donald Trump—a practice he continued in the 2020 and 2024 campaigns. He has been involved in several Republican campaigns in Kentucky.

In 2020, Roberts was heavily involved in efforts to nullify gun control in Boone County, Kentucky, citing constitutional conservatism.

In May 2022, in the hours following the Uvalde, Texas school shooting, T.J. Roberts, serving as leader of the Kentucky Liberty group, posted a meme to Twitter that was widely interpreted as suggesting that even the deaths of all children would not prompt him or the group to support gun control. When asked about his comments, Roberts initially stated that he stood by the meme but reversed his stance at a later date.

In 2024, at the age of 26, Roberts was elected as one of the youngest Republicans in Kentucky's legislature, representing Kentucky's 66th House district. Some of Roberts's endorsements included Congressman Thomas Massie, former congressman Ron Paul, Vivek Ramaswamy, Kyle Rittenhouse, Students for Trump - NKY, the National Association for Gun Rights, Kentucky Right to Life, and Republicans for National Renewal.

Roberts has been a vocal critic of Kentucky Governor Andy Beshear, particularly regarding policies implemented during the COVID-19 pandemic. In April 2020, Roberts, along with two other individuals, filed a successful federal lawsuit against Governor Beshear, alleging that the governor's executive orders restricting travel and banning in-person church services violated their First Amendment rights. The lawsuit was initiated after state troopers recorded license plate numbers of attendees at an Easter service at Maryville Baptist Church, subsequently issuing notices mandating two-week quarantines with criminal penalties for noncompliance.

On May 15, 2025, Roberts announced his reelection bid for Kentucky's 66th House district.

=== Kentucky House of Representatives ===
T.J. Roberts has been described as "Right of Liberty Caucus" in his tenure in the Kentucky House of Representatives. In his capacity as a State Representative, T.J. Roberts has been an active legislator, sponsoring multiple bills that reflect his commitment to conservative principles and his political platform.

As of March 2025, he had sponsored 36 bills and two resolutions in the House.

In his legislative role, Roberts has continued to challenge Governor Andy Beshear. In March 2025, he cosponsored HB 6, a measure aimed at curbing the executive branch's authority to issue regulations deemed economically significant. Roberts asserted that the bill was necessary to prevent what he described as executive overreach, emphasizing that state agencies should seek legislative approval before enacting substantial regulations. Governor Beshear filed a lawsuit to block the implementation of this law, arguing that it represented an unconstitutional power grab by the legislature.

==== Notable 2025 bills ====
HCR 50, also known as the Kentucky Discipline of Government Efficiency (KY DOGE), would establish an interim task force to examine Executive Branch expenditures, produce cost-saving measures to cut spending in following budget sessions, and move Kentucky toward Zero-Base Budgeting.

HB 2 entitles individuals who have paid sales taxes on Gold, Silver, and Platinum bullion to refunds, applied retroactively, from the Kentucky Department of Revenue or Governor's office. HB 2 became law on March 27, 2025, after the legislature overrode Governor Andy Beshear's veto.

Known as the Kentucky REINS Act, HB 6 limits the executive branch's authority by requiring legislative approval for economically significant regulations. In support of HB 6, which Roberts cosponsored, Roberts spoke on the importance of the legislature being the lawmaking branch, while condemning the Executive Branch's regulations as "Executive Branch lawmaking". Governor Andy Beshear named Roberts in a lawsuit over the adoption of HB 6 due to his floor speech.

HB 82 would expand Kentucky's prohibition on state and local officials enforcing federal gun control laws to all gun control laws enacted after December 15, 1791, the day the Second Amendment of the United States Constitution was ratified. Rep. Roberts' HB 82 would have the effect of nullifying all federal gun laws in Kentucky.

HB 83 would prohibit red flag laws in Kentucky.

HB 141, also known as the Defend the Guard Act, which Roberts cosponsored with Rep. Candy Massaroni, would have prohibited the federal government from deploying National Guardsmen to combat zones unless Congress passes a declaration of war.

HB 176 aims to establish a dollar-to-dollar tax refund for Kentuckians who have purchased regulated items under the National Firearms Act, including Suppressors, Short-Barreled Rifles, Short-Barreled Shotguns, and Machine Guns.

HB 213 would prohibit sanctuary cities in Kentucky, requiring local governments to comply with the Immigration and Customs Enforcement (ICE) policies. The bill would also give Kentuckians and their families a cause of action to sue local governments if the Kentuckian is hurt or killed by an undocumented immigrant who resided in a sanctuary city.

HB 254 would ban taxpayer-funded lobbying, and establish civil and criminal penalties for those who engage in taxpayer-funded lobbying or campaigning.

HB 281 proposes a sales and use tax exemption for firearm-related items, including firearms, ammunition, holsters, accessories, training courses, and safety devices.

HB 316 would list the abortion pill as a Schedule IV drug in Kentucky, while establishing felony penalties against individuals and companies that import the abortion pill into Kentucky.

HB 318 expands Kentucky's Open Meetings Act by providing that any formal action of a public agency is voidable by a court if there was not substantial compliance with statutes regarding video teleconferencing of meetings, recording of minutes, and conditions for attendance.

HB 353 would amend Kentucky's eminent domain laws, which would make it more difficult for the government to take private property for development purposes.

HB 376 would establish a bitcoin strategic reserve, allowing Kentucky to invest up to 10 percent of the Commonwealth's rainy day fund into cryptocurrencies with a market cap of $750 billion (so far, only Bitcoin has met this market cap) and gold. This bill further bans the use of Central Bank Digital Currencies in Kentucky.

HB 756 would amend the Kentucky Constitution to require new taxes/fees and tax/fee increases, at all levels of government, to go to the ballot. The ballot measure would include: 1. What is being taxed; 2. The rate at which it will be taxed; 3. The cost to the average taxpayer; and 4. Where the tax money will go.

=== Political positions ===
==== Abortion ====
Roberts has gained controversy for his anti-abortion stance. Roberts gained notoriety for introducing legislation to make prescribing the abortion pill a crime in Kentucky. Roberts has repeatedly declared abortion to be "murder". Roberts has been endorsed by anti-abortion groups like Kentucky Right to Life, Northern Kentucky Right to Life, and Students for Life.

==== Alternate currencies ====
Roberts, citing the Constitution and his distrust in the Federal Reserve System, has pledged to make Kentucky "the Gold, Silver, Bitcoin, and Crypto Capital of the World". Roberts has been praised by former Congressman Ron Paul for his stance on the gold standard, and taking efforts to allow Kentuckians to use alternative currencies.

==== Executive authority ====
Roberts is an open critic of Andy Beshear's use of emergency powers. In April 2020, Roberts, along with two other individuals, filed a successful federal lawsuit against Governor Beshear, alleging that the governor's executive orders restricting travel and banning in-person church services violated their First Amendment rights. The lawsuit was initiated after state troopers recorded license plate numbers of attendees at an Easter service at Maryville Baptist Church, subsequently issuing notices mandating two-week quarantines with criminal penalties for noncompliance. In 2021, Roberts advocated for significant reforms.

==== Mass surveillance and privacy ====
Roberts stood against HB 664, which aimed to codify road worker safety programs by authorizing the installation of speed cameras in highway work zones where workers are present. He argued that the measure would introduce public surveillance systems, raising concerns about government overreach and the erosion of individual privacy rights.

==== Veterans – Defend the Guard ====
Roberts has been an advocate for Defend the Guard, a controversial bill that prohibits the federal government from deploying National Guardsmen to combat zones without a Congressional Declaration of War.

==== Education ====
Roberts is a staunch advocate for school choice, and has pledged to refuse any donations from teacher's unions. Roberts has condemned school boards for using tax dollars to campaign against a constitutional amendment that would have allowed for school choice programs in Kentucky.

==== Property rights ====
Roberts is a staunch advocate for total property rights. He has pledged to introduce a constitutional amendment to abolish property taxes in Kentucky, and has introduced legislation to significantly reduce Kentucky's ability to use eminent domain.

==== Gun control ====
Roberts rejects all gun control and has called the Bureau of Alcohol, Tobacco, and Firearms "evil". Roberts has received the endorsement of organizations like the National Association for Gun Rights, his former employer, due to his positions on guns.

==== Transgender people in sports ====
Roberts's sister was a student athlete, and he has said that "men do not belong in girl's sports" to express his opposition to transgender persons participating in girl's sports.

=== Elections ===
- 2024 Kentucky's 66th House district incumbent Steve Rawlings did not seek reelection, and instead chose to run for Kentucky's 11th Senate district. Roberts won the 2024 Republican primary with 3,365 votes (74.2%) against former 66th House District Representative C. Ed Massey and won the 2024 Kentucky House of Representatives election with 16,368 votes (70.4%) against Democratic candidate Peggy Houston-Nienaber.
