= Shawn McPherson =

American politician

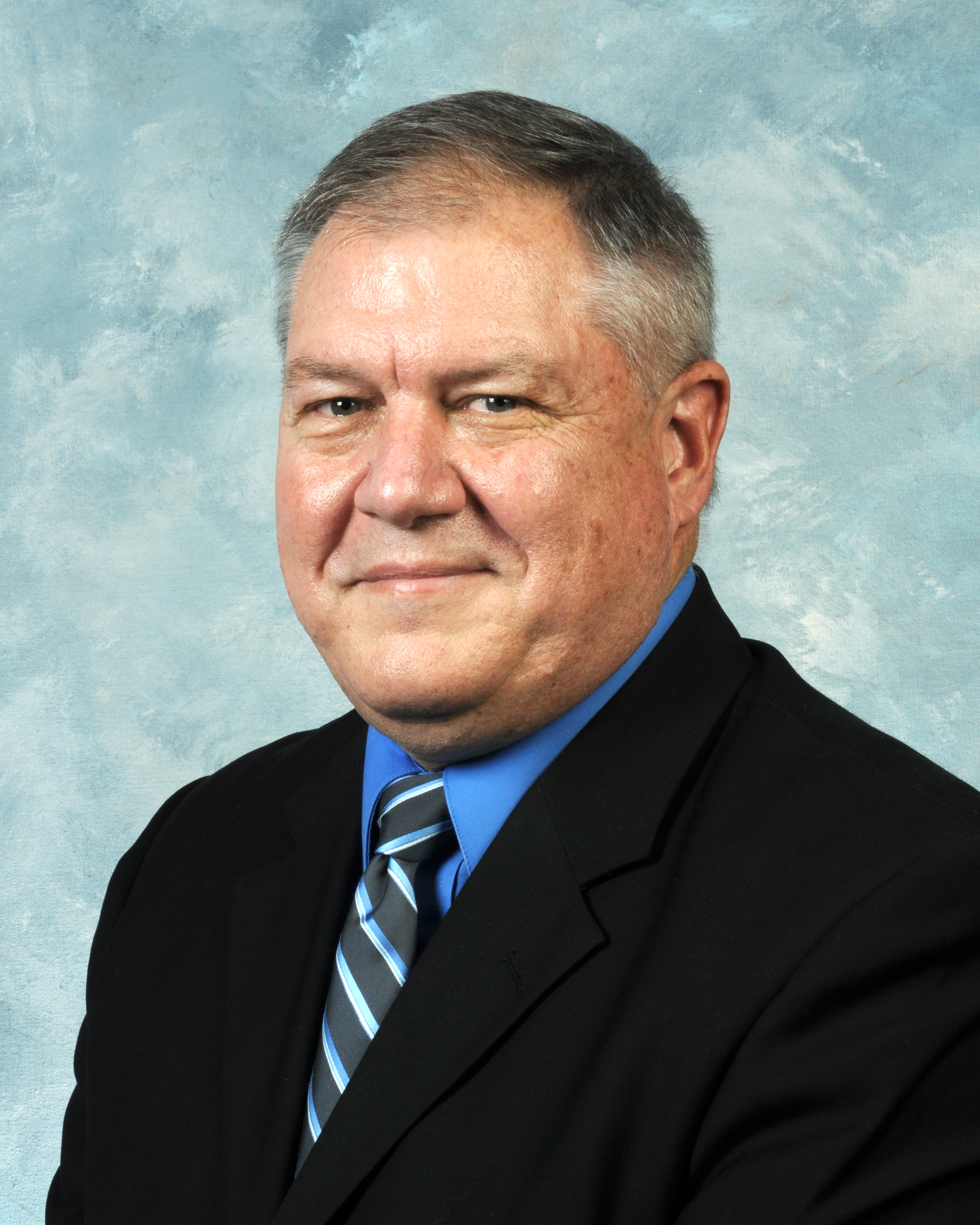

Member of the Kentucky House of Representatives from the 22nd district
- Incumbent
- Assumed office January 1, 2021
- Preceded by: Wilson Stone

Personal details
- Born: July 5, 1965 (age 61) Tompkinsville, Kentucky, U.S.
- Party: Republican
- Spouse: Susan
- Children: 4
- Education: Western Kentucky University (BS, MS)
- Committees: Capitol Project & Bond Oversight (co-chair); Appropriations & Revenue; Banking & Insurance; Tourism & Outdoor Recreation

Douglas Shawn McPherson (born July 5, 1965) is an American politician and businessman serving as a member of the Kentucky House of Representatives from Kentucky's 22nd House district. His district comprises Allen and Simpson County as well as part of Warren County.

== Background ==
McPherson was born in Tompkinsville, Kentucky on July 5, 1965, and raised on his family's dairy farm. He graduated from Gamaliel High School before earning a Bachelor of Science in agricultural business from Western Kentucky University in 1987 and a Master of Science in animal nutrition from WKU in 1991.

From 1989 to 1995, McPherson served as an appraiser for the Kentucky Transportation Cabinet. He also worked for the Kentucky Highway Department. In 1995, he founded McPherson Appraisal Service. He has also worked in various leadership positions in his family-owned assisted living facilities such as the CEO of Highland Ridge Assisted Living, CFO of Companion Care Services, and CFO of Palmer Place Assisted Living.

== Political career ==
=== Elections ===
- 2020 Democratic incumbent Wilson Stone chose not to seek reelection because of his health. McPherson won the 2020 Republican primary with 2,220 votes (48.3%) against a crowded field of three other opponents. Mcpherson won the 2020 Kentucky House of Representatives election, winning with 14,517 votes (69.3%) against Democratic candidate David Young. He assumed office on January 1, 2021.
- 2022 McPherson was unopposed in both the 2022 Republican primary and the 2022 Kentucky House of Representatives election, winning with 11,679 votes.
- 2024 McPherson was unopposed in both the 2024 Republican primary and the 2024 Kentucky House of Representatives election, winning the latter with 17,979 votes.
