= Robert Duvall (politician) =

American politician (born 1970)

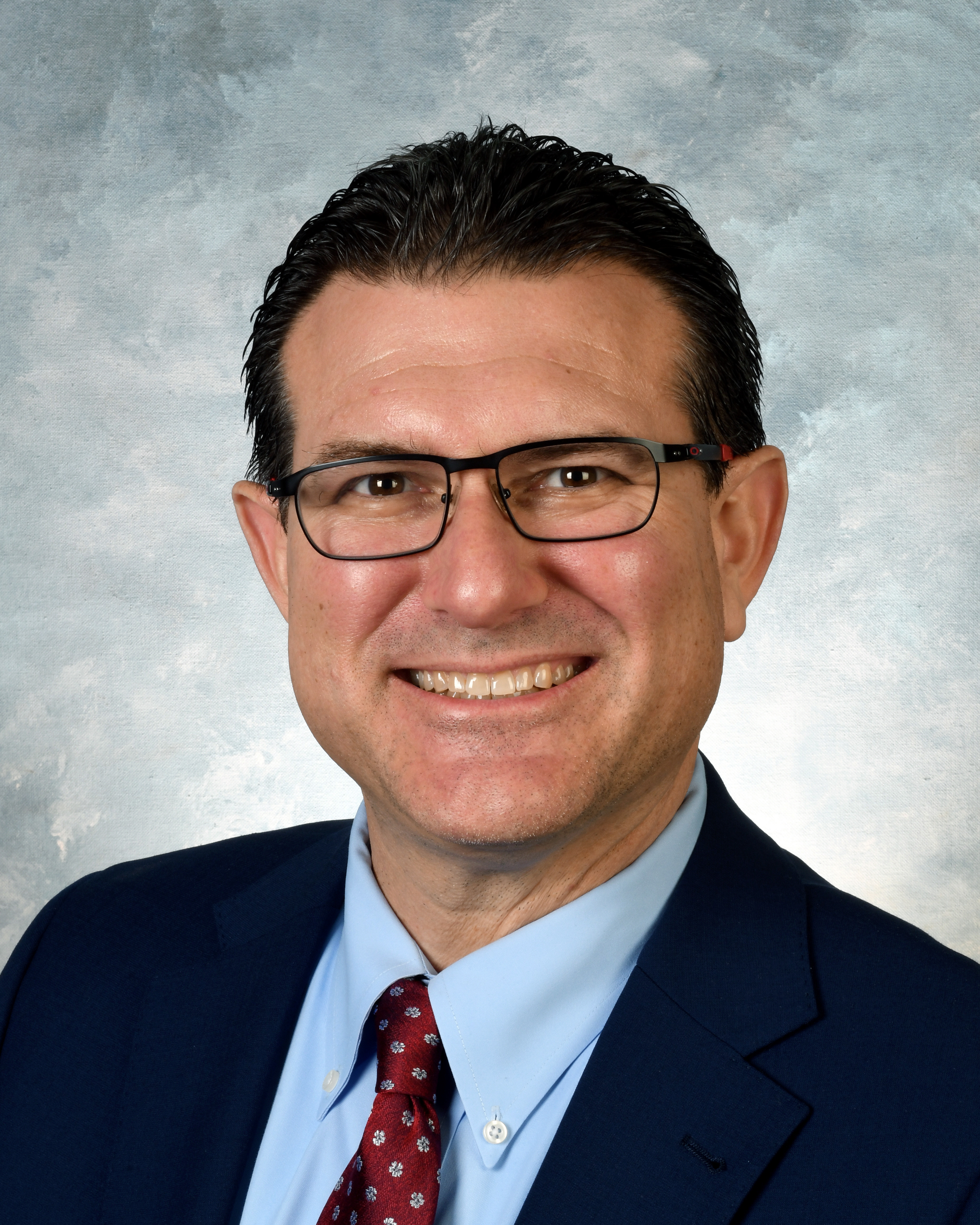
- Duvall in 2022

Member of the Kentucky House of Representatives from the 17th district
- Incumbent
- Assumed office January 1, 2023
- Preceded by: Steve Sheldon

Personal details
- Born: August 19, 1970 (age 55)
- Party: Republican
- Spouse: Amy Duvall
- Education: Western Kentucky University; University of Alabama at Birmingham (OD)
- Profession: Optometrist
- Committees: Health Services (vice chair); Banking and Insurance; Economic Development and Workforce Investment; Families and Children

Robert Burlien Duvall (born August 19, 1970) is an American politician who has served as a Republican member of the Kentucky House of Representatives since January 2023. He represents Kentucky's 17th House district, which comprises part of Warren County. He also works part-time at Western Kentucky University.

== Background ==
Duvall grew up in Warren County, Kentucky, where his father worked as a truck driver and small business owner. Duvall earned a Bachelor of Science in pre-optometry from Western Kentucky University, and then earned his Doctor of Optometry from the University of Alabama at Birmingham in 1995. He is a Baptist, and serves as an elder of Living Hope Baptist Church.

== Political career ==
=== Positions ===
Duvall is pro-life, and opposes vaccine mandates as well as sanctuary city immigration policies.

=== Elections ===
- 2022 Duvall announced his candidacy for Kentucky's 17th House District on the same day that incumbent Steve Sheldon announced that he would not be seeking reelection. Duvall was unopposed in both the 2022 Republican primary, and the 2022 Kentucky House of Representatives election. He assumed office in January 2023.
- 2024 Duvall was unopposed in both the 2024 Republican primary and the 2024 Kentucky House of Representatives election, winning the latter with 14,542 votes.

Kentucky House of Representatives
Preceded by Steve Sheldon	Member of the Kentucky House of Representatives; 2023–present	Succeeded by incumbent
