= Steve Sheldon =

American politician

Member of the Kentucky House of Representatives from the 17th district
- In office January 1, 2019 – January 1, 2023
- Preceded by: Jim DeCesare
- Succeeded by: Robert Duvall

Personal details
- Born: March 30, 1960 (age 66)
- Party: Republican

Steven Earl Sheldon (born March 30, 1960) is an American politician from Kentucky. He is a member of the Republican party and represented District 17 in the Kentucky House of Representatives from January 1, 2019, to January 1, 2023. He sponsored numerous pieces of legislation for Kentuckians. He has represented the Treasury, Auditor, Veterans, Physician Assistants, teachers and Pharmacy etc. in the State House. He did not seek reelection in 2022.
