= C. Ed Massey =

American politician

Member of the Kentucky House of Representatives from the 66th district
- In office January 1, 2019 – January 1, 2023
- Preceded by: Addia Wuchner
- Succeeded by: Steve Rawlings

Personal details
- Born: October 14, 1967 (age 58) Hebron, Kentucky, U.S.
- Party: Republican
- Spouse: Anita
- Children: 3
- Education: Eastern Kentucky University (BS); Northern Kentucky University (JD)

C. Ed Massey (born October 14, 1967) is an American attorney and politician who served as a member of the Kentucky House of Representatives, representing the 66th district from 2019 to 2023. Massey was defeated for renomination in 2022 by Steve Rawlings. He unsuccessfully ran again for his seat in 2024, losing the Republican primary to T. J. Roberts.

== Early life and education ==
Massey was born in Hebron, Kentucky in 1967. He earned a Bachelor of Science degree in criminal justice and police science from Eastern Kentucky University and a Juris Doctor from the Salmon P. Chase College of Law at Northern Kentucky University.

== Career ==
Massey is licensed to practice law in Kentucky, Ohio, and Indiana. In 2012 and 2013, he was the president of the National School Boards Association. He was also a board member of the National PTA, National Underground Railroad Freedom Center, New York Says Thank You Foundation, American Public Education Foundation, and Boone County Schools. Since 2008, he has worked as an attorney at Blankenship Massey & Associates. Massey was elected to the Kentucky House of Representatives in November 2018 and assumed office on January 1, 2019. He served as chair of the House Judiciary Committee.
