= Donna Mayfield =

American politician

Member of the Kentucky House of Representatives from the 73rd district
- In office January 1, 2011 – January 1, 2019
- Preceded by: Don Pasley
- Succeeded by: Les Yates

Personal details
- Born: July 18, 1955 (age 71) Lexington, Kentucky
- Party: Republican
- Spouse: Bob Mayfield
- Education: Lexington Community College
- Occupation: Administrative Officer, United States Marshals Service, Ret.

Donna Mayfield (born July 18, 1955) is a former Republican politician who represented district 73 in the Kentucky House of Representatives from 2011 to 2019. She was the first woman elected to represent Clark County in the Kentucky General Assembly. She did not seek reelection in 2018.

== Background ==
Donna Mayfield was born in Lexington, Kentucky, where she graduated from Bryan Station High School in 1973 and attended Lexington Community College (now Bluegrass Community and Technical College). She began working at the U.S. Attorney's Office in June 1973, and transferred to the United States Marshals Service in Lexington in June 1975. She worked at the United States Marshals Service until retiring as Administrative Officer in September 2001 and was awarded the U.S. Marshals Service Director's Special Achievement Award in 1987. In 2007 she came out of retirement to work at the Clark County Sheriff's Office in Winchester, Kentucky, where she worked until she was elected as the Kentucky State Representative for Kentucky House District 73.

Mayfield is a member of Calvary Christian Church and the Winchester Chamber of Commerce.

== Political career ==
=== 2010 election ===
In January 2010, first-time candidate Donna Mayfield announced that she would run for the Kentucky House of Representatives for the 73rd House District. At the time, the district was represented by four-term incumbent State Representative Don Pasley (D-Clark).

Both candidates were uncontested in the May primary races for their respective party nominations.

As the general election approached, both parties expected the political environment to be more favorable to the Republican candidates. Yet as late as October 20, 2010, the Richmond Register stated that incumbent Don Pasley as favored to win re-election, and Kentucky House Speaker Greg Stumbo did not list Pasley as a candidate he believed was among those Democrats especially targeted by Republicans as vulnerable. Kentucky House Minority Leader Jeff Hoover did note that Mayfield was "turning out to be a good campaigner." So it was considered an upset when Mayfield won the general election on November 2, 2010, garnering 53.11% to Pasley's 46.89% of the vote. The 73rd District includes all of Clark County and part of Madison County, making Mayfield the first female state legislator elected to represent Clark County.

In January 2011, Mayfield was sworn into office and appointed to serve on the House Committees on Education, Transportation, and Economic Development, and Interim Subcommittee on Postsecondary Education.

=== 2012 election ===
Donna Mayfield ran for reelection to the Kentucky House of Representatives for the 73rd House District. She faced Democratic challenger JoEllen Reed in the General Election in November. Both candidates were uncontested in the May primary races for their respective party nominations.

=== Animal protection ===
In 2015, Mayfield came under fire for tacking an unrelated amendment requiring fetal ultrasounds onto KY HB 177, a bill designed to assure that animals in Kentucky have adequate shelter. Kentucky has been rated the worst state for animal protection for seven years in a row, and is projected to 'win' this rating for year eight.
