= Les Yates =

American politician

Judge/Executive of Clark County
- In office January 2, 2023 – March 3, 2026
- Preceded by: Henry Branham
- Succeeded by: Steve Craycraft (interim)

Member of the Kentucky House of Representatives from the 73rd district
- In office January 1, 2019 – January 1, 2021
- Preceded by: Donna Mayfield
- Succeeded by: Ryan Dotson

Personal details
- Party: Republican

Military service
- Allegiance: United States
- Branch/service: United States Air Force
- Years of service: 1971–1975

Les Yates is an American politician from Kentucky who served as Judge/Executive of Clark County from January 2023 until his resignation in March 2026.

He previously served one term as a member of the Kentucky House of Representatives from 2019 to 2021. He was defeated for renomination in the 2020 Republican primary by Ryan Dotson, and was defeated again in the Republican primary to regain his former house seat in 2026.

== Biography ==
Les Yates was born in Eastern Kentucky, and joined the United States Air Force after graduating from high school. From 1971 to 1975, he served as an aircraft electrician and was deployed to Germany and Arizona. Afterwards, he attended Arizona State University and graduated with a Bachelor of Science degree in electrical engineering. For eighteen years afterwards, he worked in Phoenix.

=== Political career ===
Yates was defeated in the 2016 Republican primary for Kentucky's 73rd House district, garnering 375 votes (20.8%) against incumbent Donna Mayfield. Mayfield initially filed to run for reelection in 2018, but withdraw before the Republican primary. After this, Yates received the Republican nomination unopposed and won the general election with 10,856 votes (64.3%) against Democratic nominee Pat Brooks. Yates was defeated for renomination in the 2020 Republican primary, garnering 2,228 votes (48.6%) against Ryan Dotson.

Yates won the 2022 Republican primary for Judge/Executive of Clark County against Greg Elkins, and won the general election against Democratic nominee Justin Charles.

In January 2026, Yates filed to run for his former house seat instead of reelection following Dotson's decision to run for congress. Yates subsequently resigned as judge/executive on March 3 in order to focus on the election. Yates lost to magistrate Daniel Konstantopoulos for the Republican nomination in the 2026 Kentucky House of Representatives election.
