= Addia Wuchner =

American politician (born 1955)

Member of the Kentucky House of Representatives from the 66th district
- In office January 1, 2005 – January 1, 2019
- Preceded by: Charlie Walton
- Succeeded by: C. Ed Massey

Personal details
- Born: June 8, 1955 (age 71) Kentucky, U.S.
- Party: Republican
- Education: University of Louisville (BSN)

Addia Kathryn Wuchner (born June 8, 1955, in Kentucky) is an American politician and nurse who served as a Republican member of the Kentucky House of Representatives for the 66th district from 2005 to 2019. She did not run for reelection in 2018.

== Education ==
Wuchner attended Bellarmine University and Pontifical Athenaeum Regina Apostolorum before earning an RN degree from the University of Louisville.

== Elections ==
- 2012 Wuchner was challenged in the three-way May 22, 2012 Republican primary, winning with 1,995 votes (52.9%) and was unopposed for the November 6, 2012 general election, winning with 17,272 votes.
- 2004 When District 66 Representative Charlie Walton ran for Kentucky Senate and left the seat open, Wuchner won the 2004 Republican primary with 1,919 votes (62.6%) and was unopposed for the November 2, 2004 general election, winning with 15,137 votes.
- 2006 Wuchner was unopposed for both the 2006 Republican primary and the November 7, 2006 general election, winning with 8,673 votes.
- 2008 Wuchner was unopposed for both the 2008 Republican primary and the November 4, 2008 general election, winning with 16,864 votes.
- 2010 Wuchner was unopposed for both the May 18, 2010 Republican primary and the November 2, 2010 general election, winning with 11,080 votes.
- 2011 When Democratic state auditor Crit Luallen left the position open, Wuchner ran in the 2011 Republican primary, but lost to John Kemper, who lost the November 2011 general election to Democratic nominee Adam Edelen.
