= Diane St. Onge =

American politician

Member of the Kentucky House of Representatives from the 63rd district
- In office January 1, 2013 – July 2019
- Preceded by: Alecia Webb-Edgington
- Succeeded by: Kim Banta

Personal details
- Born: July 21, 1956 (age 70)
- Party: Republican
- Education: Northern Kentucky University; Santa Clara University; Salmon P. Chase College of Law
- Profession: Attorney
- Website: dianestonge.com

Diane St. Onge (born June 21, 1956) is an American politician and a former Republican member of the Kentucky House of Representatives representing District 63. She served from 2013 to 2019.

== Education ==
St. Onge earned her Bachelor of Arts from the Northern Kentucky University, graduated from Santa Clara University, and earned her Juris Doctor from Northern Kentucky University.

== Elections ==
- 2012 When District 63 Representative Alecia Webb-Edgington ran for United States House of Representatives for Kentucky's 4th congressional district and left the seat open, St. Onge won the May 22, 2012 Republican Primary with 3,366 votes (76.7%) and was unopposed for the November 6, 2012 General election, winning with 16,812 votes.

== Committees ==
St. Onge chaired the Small Business & Information Technology Committee, and served on the Kentucky House Economic Investment & Workforce Investment Committee and the Licensing, Occupations, & Administrative Regulations Committee.
