= Phillip Pratt =

American politician

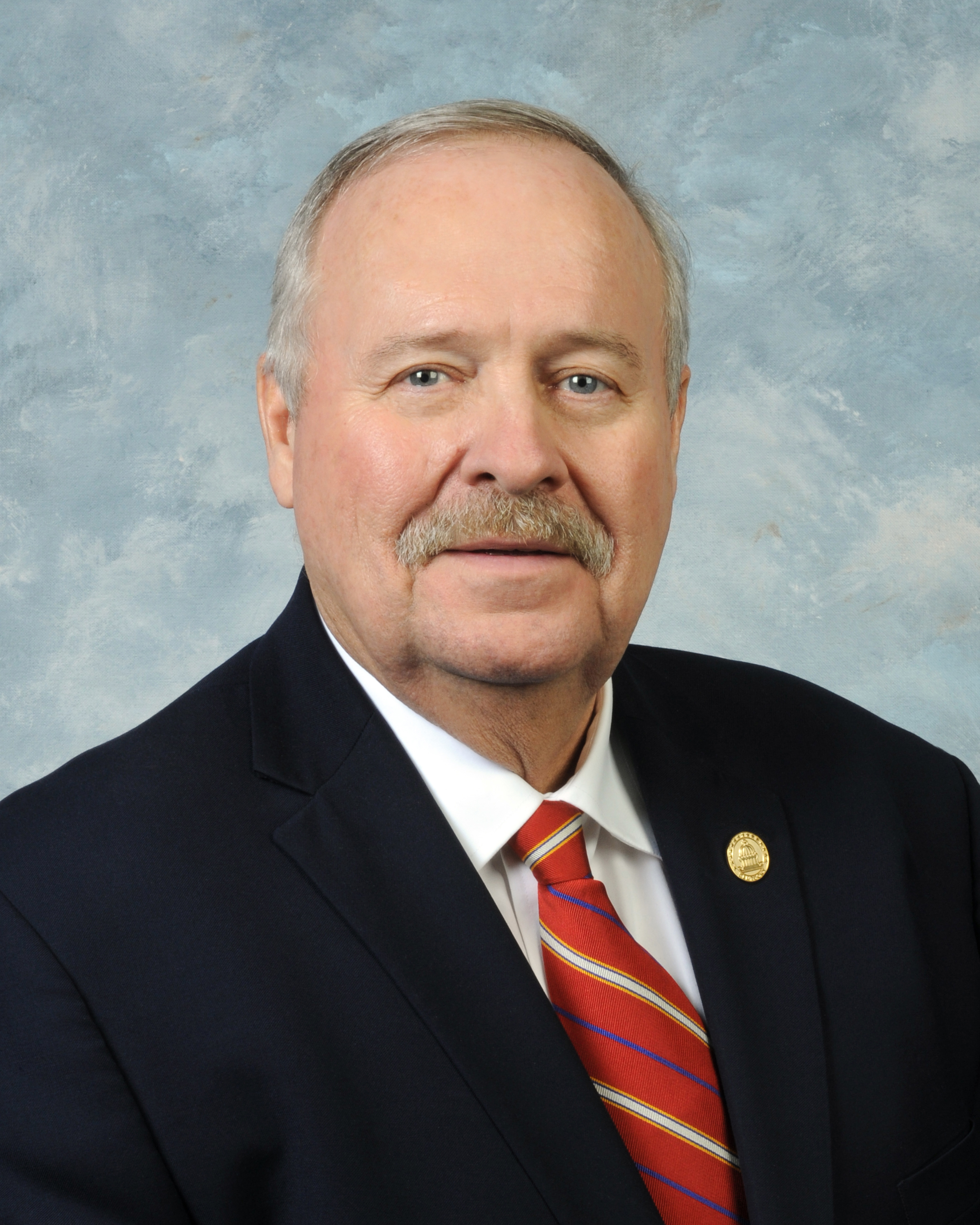

Member of the Kentucky House of Representatives from the 62nd district
- In office January 1, 2017 – January 1, 2025
- Preceded by: Chuck Tackett
- Succeeded by: Tony Hampton

Personal details
- Born: May 12, 1955 (age 71) Georgetown, Kentucky
- Party: Republican
- Spouse: Martha Jane Nave
- Children: 3
- Committees: Small Business & Information Technology (Chair); Licensing, Occupations, & Administrative Regulations; Agriculture; Economic Development & Workforce Investment

Phillip Randolph Pratt (born May 12, 1955) is an American politician who was a Republican member of the Kentucky House of Representatives from 2017 to 2025. His district consisted of part of Scott County. Pratt did not seek reelection in 2024.

== Background ==
Pratt graduated from Scott County High School before earning a Bachelor of Science in agricultural economics from the University of Kentucky. While at UK, Pratt was a member of Alpha Gamma Rho.

After graduation, Pratt was employed as an assistant manager for Southern States Cooperative and afterwards spent ten years as a location manager for Cargill. Today, Pratt is the owner and president of Pratt's Lawn and Landscape, a family business that he began with his two sons in 1995.

== Political career ==
=== Elections ===
- 2016 (special) Governor Matt Bevin called for a special election to be held on March 8, 2016, following the resignation of incumbent representative Ryan Quarles to assume the position of Kentucky Commissioner of Agriculture. Pratt was defeated in the 2016 Kentucky House of Representatives special election, garnering 3,210 votes (48.1%) against Democratic candidate Chuck Tackett.
- 2016 Pratt was unopposed in the 2016 Republican primary and won the 2016 Kentucky House of Representatives election with 12,662 votes (57.6%) against incumbent Democratic representative Chuck Tackett.
- 2018 Pratt was unopposed in the 2018 Republican primary and won the 2018 Kentucky House of Representatives election with 11,228 votes (57.8%) against Democratic candidate Jennifer Urie.
- 2020 Pratt was unopposed in the 2020 Republican primary and won the 2020 Kentucky House of Representatives election with 17,470 votes (69%) against Democratic candidate David Mayo.
- 2022 Pratt won the 2022 Republican primary with 3,264 votes (79.8%) and was unopposed in the 2022 Kentucky House of Representatives election, winning with 11,054 votes.
