= Regina Bunch =

American politician and educator

Member of the Kentucky House of Representatives from the 82nd district
- In office January 3, 2012 – January 1, 2023
- Preceded by: Dewayne Bunch
- Succeeded by: Nick Wilson

Personal details
- Party: Republican

Regina Petrey Bunch (born October 3, 1962) is an American Republican politician and educator who was a member of the Kentucky House of Representatives from 2012 to 2023. She retired from the house in 2022.

Bunch was a special education teacher in the middle school and lives in Williamsburg, Kentucky. In 2011, she was elected to the Kentucky House of Representatives in a special election succeeding her husband Dewayne Bunch who was fatally injured while breaking up a student fight at the high school where he had taught.
