= Melinda Gibbons Prunty =

American politician

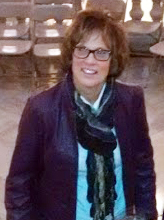
- Prunty in the Kentucky State Capitol in 2017

Member of the Kentucky House of Representatives from the 15th district
- In office January 1, 2017 – January 1, 2023
- Preceded by: Brent Yonts
- Succeeded by: Rebecca Raymer

Personal details
- Born: December 5, 1957 (age 68)
- Party: Republican
- Spouse: Marshall E. Prunty
- Children: 3
- Education: University of Kentucky; Saint Meinrad Seminary and School of Theology
- Profession: Physical therapist

Melinda Gibbons Prunty (born December 5, 1957) is a Republican politician who represented Kentucky's 15th legislative district in the Kentucky House of Representatives from 2017 to 2023. She did not seek reelection in 2022.

== Personal life ==
Prunty earned a bachelor's degree in physical therapy from the University of Kentucky in 1979. She also holds a Master of Theological Studies degree from Saint Meinrad Seminary and School of Theology in Saint Meinrad, Indiana, which she completed in 2010.

Prunty and her husband, Marshall, have three daughters – Kaci, Lindsay, and Hillary. Marshall Prunty, a doctor, was unsuccessful in three attempts to capture the 15th district seat in the Kentucky House.

Prunty was raised in the Methodist church, but converted to Roman Catholicism as an adult. She served as director of the Office of Youth Ministry for the Roman Catholic Diocese of Owensboro, resigning in 2016 to seek public office.

== Political career ==
In 2016, Prunty filed as a Republican to challenge incumbent Democrat Brent Yonts for his seat representing Kentucky's 15th district in the state House of Representatives. She said her primary impetus for running was "getting pro-life legislation passed". Her other stated priorities as a candidate were to reduce regulations, particularly those affecting small businesses and the coal industry; improving the quality and lowering the cost of healthcare, especially for veterans; reforming adoption law; and strengthening protections for religious freedom and gun rights.

In the November 8, 2016, general election Prunty defeated Yonts by a vote of 10,597 to 7,973. Yonts told The Messenger-Inquirer, "It wasn't me, it was Trump", noting that over half of the 15th district voted a Republican straight ticket, with presidential candidate Donald Trump at the top of the ballot. Prunty's election was part of a Republican landslide in Kentucky that saw the party take control of the state House for the first time since 1921. Including Prunty, 17 Republican challengers unseated Democratic incumbents in the election, turning a 53–47 Democratic majority into a 64–36 Republican majority.
