= Adam Koenig =

American politician (born 1971)

Member of the Kentucky House of Representatives from the 69th district
- In office January 1, 2007 – January 1, 2023
- Preceded by: Jon Reinhardt
- Succeeded by: Steven Doan

Kenton County Commissioner from the 3rd district
- In office January 4, 1999 – January 1, 2007
- Preceded by: Steve Arlinghaus
- Succeeded by: Kris Knochelmann

Member of the Villa Hills City Council
- In office January 3, 1994 – January 6, 1997

Personal details
- Born: February 22, 1971 (age 55) Covington, Kentucky, U.S.
- Party: Republican
- Education: Miami University (BA)

Adam Koenig (born February 22, 1971) is an American politician who represented district 69 in the Kentucky House of Representatives from 2007 to 2023. He was defeated for renomination in 2022 by Steven Doan. Koenig was the Republican nominee in the 2003 Kentucky State Treasurer election, losing to Demcoratic nominee Jonathan Miller. He previously served as a Kenton County Commissioner and as a member of the Villa Hills City Council.

== Education ==
Koenig graduated from Covington Catholic High School in 1989. He earned a Bachelor of Arts degree in political science from Miami University.

== Career ==
Koenig was the primary sponsor to a change in the law that prevents federally certified radiologists from analyzing X-rays to assess black lung compensation claims, restricting such determinations to pulmonologists.

== Elections ==
- 2012: Koenig was unopposed for both the May 22, 2012 Republican Primary, and the November 6, 2012 General election, winning with 13,337 votes.
- 2010 Koenig was challenged in the May 18, 2010 Republican Primary, winning with 2,209 votes (66.7%) and was unopposed for the November 2, 2010 General election, winning with 8,646 votes.
- 2008: Koenig was unopposed for the 2008 Republican Primary, and won the November 4, 2008 General election with 9,592 votes (56.6%) against Democratic nominee Merrick Krey.
- 2006: When district 69 Representative Jon Reinhardt retired and left his seat open, Koenig won the three-way 2006 Republican Primary with 767 votes (42.2%) and won the November 7, 2006 General election with 5,351 votes (50.9%) against Democratic nominee Randy Blankenship.
- 2003: To challenge incumbent Democratic Kentucky State Treasurer Jonathan Miller, Koenig was unopposed for the Republican Primary, but lost the November 2003 General election to Miller.

Party political offices
Vacant Title last held by James H. Lambert	Republican nominee for Kentucky State Treasurer; 2003	Succeeded by Melinda L. Wheeler
