= Bart Rowland =

American politician

Member of the Kentucky House of Representatives
- In office February 14, 2012 – January 1, 2023
- Preceded by: James Comer
- Succeeded by: Amy Neighbors
- Constituency: 53rd district (2012–2015); 21st district (2015–2023)

Personal details
- Born: April 11, 1977 (age 49)
- Party: Republican
- Education: Western Kentucky University

Bartholomew Thomas Rowland (born April 11, 1977) is an American politician and a Republican member of the Kentucky House of Representatives representing District 21 until 2023. He was first elected in a February 7, 2012 special election to fill the vacancy caused by the resignation of Representative James Comer to become state agriculture commissioner. Rowland did not seek reelection in 2022.

== Education ==
Rowland attended Western Kentucky University.

== Elections ==
- 2012 When District 53 Representative James Comer resigned and left the seat vacant, Rowland won the February 7, 2012 Special election with 2,699 votes (%) against Democratic candidate Barry Steele.
- Rowland won the three-way May 22, 2012 Republican Primary with 2,965 votes (60.9%) and won the November 6, 2012 General election with 10,688 votes (69.0%) against Democratic nominee Thomas Dodson.

Kentucky House of Representatives
Preceded by James Comer	Member of the Kentucky House of Representatives from the 53rd district 2012–2015	Succeeded by James Tipton
Preceded by Jim DeCesare	Member of the Kentucky House of Representatives from the 21st district 2015–2023	Succeeded by Amy Neighbors
