= John Sims Jr. =

American politician

John Sims

Judge/Executive of Fleming County
- Incumbent
- Assumed office January 2, 2023
- Preceded by: Larry Foxworthy

Member of the Kentucky House of Representatives from the 70th district
- In office January 1, 2017 – January 1, 2021
- Preceded by: Mike Denham
- Succeeded by: William Lawrence

Personal details
- Party: Republican (since 2021); Democratic (before 2021)

John Hanson Sims Jr. (born May 4, 1978) is an American politician from Kentucky who was a Democratic member of the Kentucky House of Representatives from 2017 to 2021. Sims was first elected in 2016 after incumbent representative Mike Denham retired. He did not seek reelection in 2020 and was succeeded by Republican William Lawrence.

In 2021 Sims announced that he would run for Judge/Executive of Fleming County. He ran as a Republican, succeeding retiring Judge/Executive Larry Foxworthy.
