= Tommy Turner (politician) =

American politician

Member of the Kentucky House of Representatives from the 85th district
- In office January 1, 1997 – January 1, 2021
- Preceded by: Tom Jensen
- Succeeded by: Shane Baker

Personal details
- Born: August 8, 1952 (age 73)
- Party: Republican

Thomas J. Turner (born August 8, 1952) is an American politician who served as a Republican member of the Kentucky House of Representatives for the 85th district from 1997 to 2021. He did not seek reelection in 2020.

== Political career ==
=== Legislative history ===
Representative Turner has distinguished himself by his lack of impact, failing to introduce a single piece of stand-alone legislation during his 20-year tenure in the legislature.

=== Animal protection ===
In 2015, Turner came under fire for tacking an amendment requiring a health insurance policy, pursuant to the Affordable Care Act, on to KY HB 177, a bill designed to assure that animals in Kentucky have adequate shelter. Kentucky has been rated the worst state for animal protection for seven years in a row, and is projected to "win" this rating for year eight.

=== Elections ===
- 1996 Turner won the four-way 1996 Republican primary and was unopposed for the November 5, 1996 general election.
- 1998 Turner was unopposed for both the 1998 Republican primary and the November 3, 1998 general election.
- 2000 Turner was unopposed for both the 2000 Republican primary and the November 7, 2000 general election, winning with 10,984 votes.
- 2002 Turner was unopposed for both the 2002 Republican primary and the November 5, 2002 general election, winning with 7,512 votes.
- 2004 Turner was unopposed for both the 2004 Republican primary and the November 2, 2004 general election, winning with 13,292 votes.
- 2006 Turner was challenged in the 2006 Republican primary, winning with 7,412 votes (80.0%) and was unopposed for the November 7, 2006 general election, winning with 10,262 votes.
- 2008 Turner was unopposed for both the 2008 Republican primary and the November 4, 2008 general election, winning with 14,887 votes.
- 2010 Turner was challenged in the May 18, 2010 Republican primary, winning with 7,310 votes (73.5%) and was unopposed for the November 2, 2010 general election, winning with 11,710 votes.
- 2012 Turner was unopposed for both the May 22, 2012 Republican primary and the November 6, 2012 general election, winning with 15,792 votes.
- 2018 Turner was challenged by Mona Hampton Eldrige, the first challenge he has faced in more than a decade.
