= Jerry T. Miller =

American politician

Member of the Kentucky House of Representatives from the 36th district
- In office January 1, 2015 – January 1, 2023
- Preceded by: Jonathan Shell (redistricting)
- Succeeded by: John Hodgson

Member of the Louisville Metro Council from the 19th district
- In office January 2011 – January 1, 2015
- Preceded by: Hal Heiner
- Succeeded by: Julie Denton

Personal details
- Born: December 11, 1951 (age 74) Louisville, Kentucky, U.S.
- Party: Republican
- Spouse: Laura
- Children: 1
- Education: University of Kentucky (BS)

Jerry Thomas Miller (born December 11, 1951) is an American politician. He is a Republican who represented District 36 in the Kentucky House of Representatives. He did not seek reelection in 2022.

== Early life ==
Miller was born in Louisville, Kentucky. He earned a Bachelor of Science in Accounting from the University of Kentucky in 1973.

== Political career ==
Miller served on the Louisville Metro Council from 2011 to 2014.

In 2014, Miller was elected to represent District 36 in the Kentucky House of Representatives. He was reelected to the position three times.

=== Electoral record ===
2014 general election: Kentucky House of Representatives, District 36
Party	Candidate	Votes	%
Republican	Jerry T. Miller	13,162	68.8%
Democratic	Debbie Barber	5,975	31.2%

Miller was unopposed in 2016.

2018 general election: Kentucky House of Representatives, District 36
Party	Candidate	Votes	%
Republican	Jerry T. Miller	13,869	58.3%
Democratic	Maurice Sweeney	9,936	41.7%
