= Wilson Stone (politician) =

American politician (1952–2022)

Member of the Kentucky House of Representatives from the 22nd district
- In office January 1, 2009 – January 1, 2021
- Preceded by: Rob Wilkey
- Succeeded by: Shawn McPherson

Personal details
- Born: November 16, 1952 Scottsville, Kentucky, U.S.
- Died: June 17, 2022 (aged 69) Bowling Green, Kentucky, U.S.
- Party: Democratic
- Spouse: Lanna
- Children: 2

Wilson Lee Stone (November 16, 1952 – June 17, 2022) was an American politician from Kentucky. He served as a member of the Kentucky House of Representatives for the 22nd district from 2009 to 2021. He did not seek reelection in 2020. Stone died following a long illness on June 17, 2022, at the age of 69.
