= George Brown Jr. (Kentucky politician) =

American politician

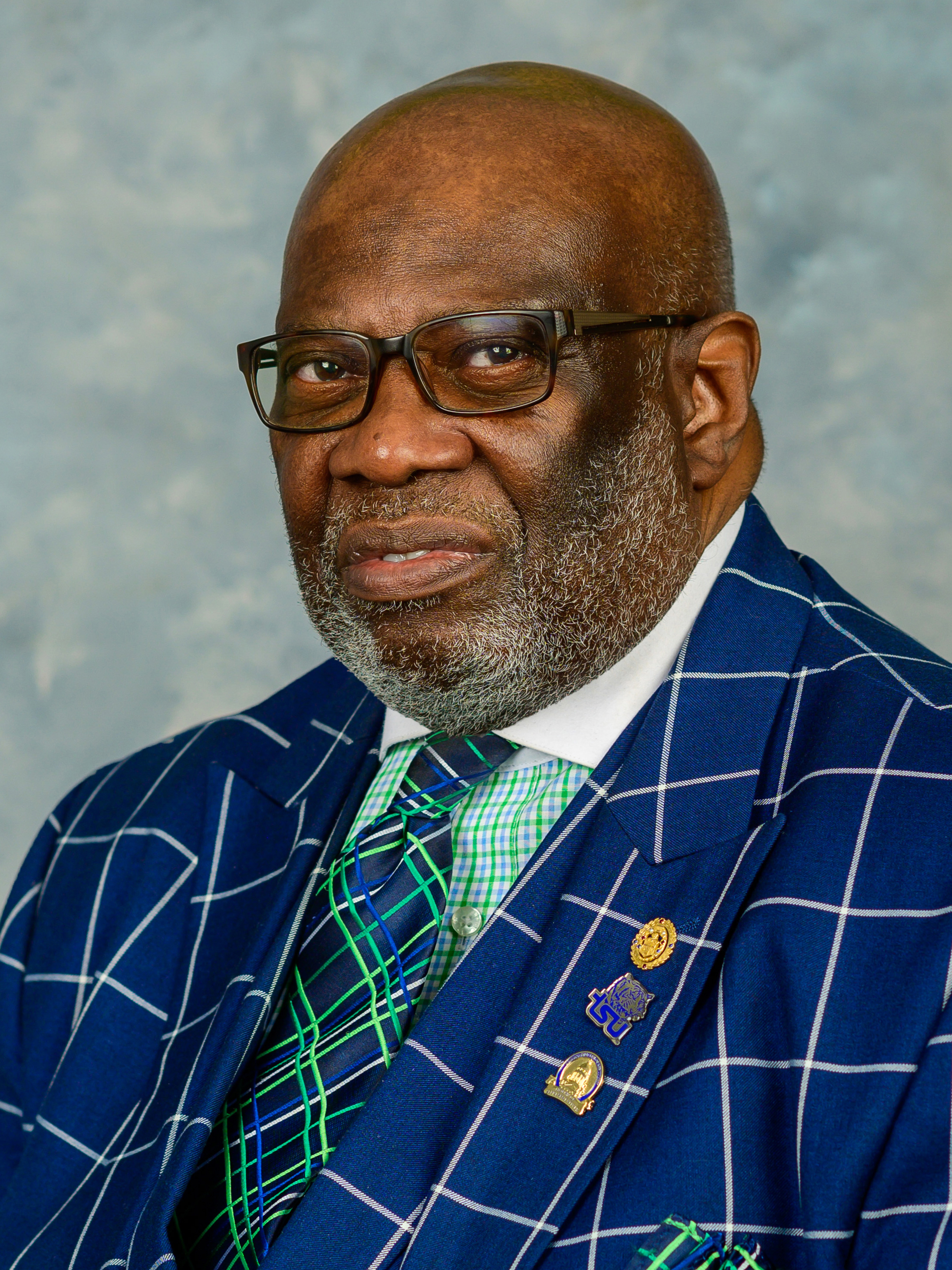

Member of the Kentucky House of Representatives from the 77th district
- Incumbent
- Assumed office January 1, 2015
- Preceded by: Jesse Crenshaw

Personal details
- Born: November 14, 1948 (age 77) Lexington, Kentucky, U.S.
- Party: Democratic
- Education: Tennessee State University (BS)

George A. Brown Jr. (born November 14, 1948) is an American politician serving as a member of the Kentucky House of Representatives from the 77th district. Elected in November 2014, he assumed office on January 1, 2015.

== Early life and education ==
Brown was born in Lexington, Kentucky. He earned a Bachelor of Science degree in business administration from Tennessee State University.

== Career ==
Outside of politics, Brown has worked for the University of Kentucky Facilities Management Department. He was elected to the Kentucky House of Representatives in November 2014 and assumed office on January 1, 2015.

== Personal life ==
Brown is Catholic and attends St. Peter Claver Catholic Church in Lexington.
