= Wil Schroder =

American politician

Member of the Kentucky Senate from the 24th district
- In office January 1, 2015 – January 1, 2023
- Preceded by: Katie Kratz Stine
- Succeeded by: Shelley Funke Frommeyer

Personal details
- Born: June 29, 1982 (age 44) Wilder, Kentucky
- Party: Republican

Wil Schroder (born June 29, 1982) is an American politician who served in the Kentucky Senate representing the 24th district from 2015 to 2023. His father, Wilfrid Schroder, served on the Kentucky Supreme Court. He announced on May 22, 2021, that he would not run for re-election in 2022.

On November 14, 2023, Kentucky Attorney General-Elect Russell Coleman announced Schroder, who was a co-chair of his Transition Team, would serve as Senior Counsel.

Schroder is running unopposed for Campbell County Attorney in the November 2026 election.
