= Paul Hornback =

American politician

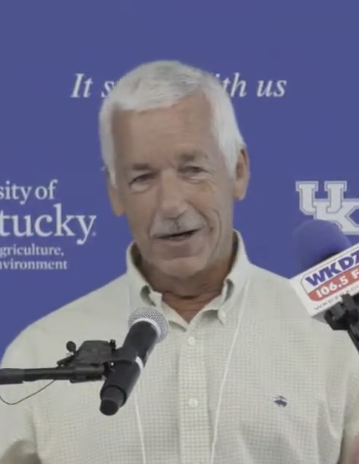

Member of the Kentucky Senate from the 20th district
- In office January 1, 2011 – January 1, 2023
- Preceded by: Gary Tapp
- Succeeded by: Gex Williams

Personal details
- Born: Shelbyville, Kentucky
- Party: Republican

Paul Hornback (born in Shelbyville, Kentucky) is an American politician and former Republican member of the Kentucky Senate. Hornback represented District 20 from January 2011 to January 2023.

== Education ==
Hornback graduated from Shelby County High School.

== Elections ==
February 24, 2023.

- 2022 Hornback did not run for re-election.
- 2018 Hornback was unopposed in the May 22, 2018, Republican Primary and defeated Democratic nominee Dave Suetholz in the November 6, 2018, general election winning with 25,775 votes (56.5%).
- 2014 Hornback won the May 20, 2014, Republican Primary with 6,079 votes (82.9%) against Tony McCurdy. Paul Hornback was unopposed in the November 4, 2014, general election.
- 2010 When District 20 Senator Gary Tapp retired and left the seat open, Hornback won the May 18, 2010, Republican Primary with 5,328 votes (62.9%) and won the November 2, 2010, general election with 26,883 votes (60.5%) against Democratic nominee David Eaton, who had run for a House seat in 2002 and 2004.
