= Stanley H. Humphries =

American teacher, farmer, and politician

Stan Humphries
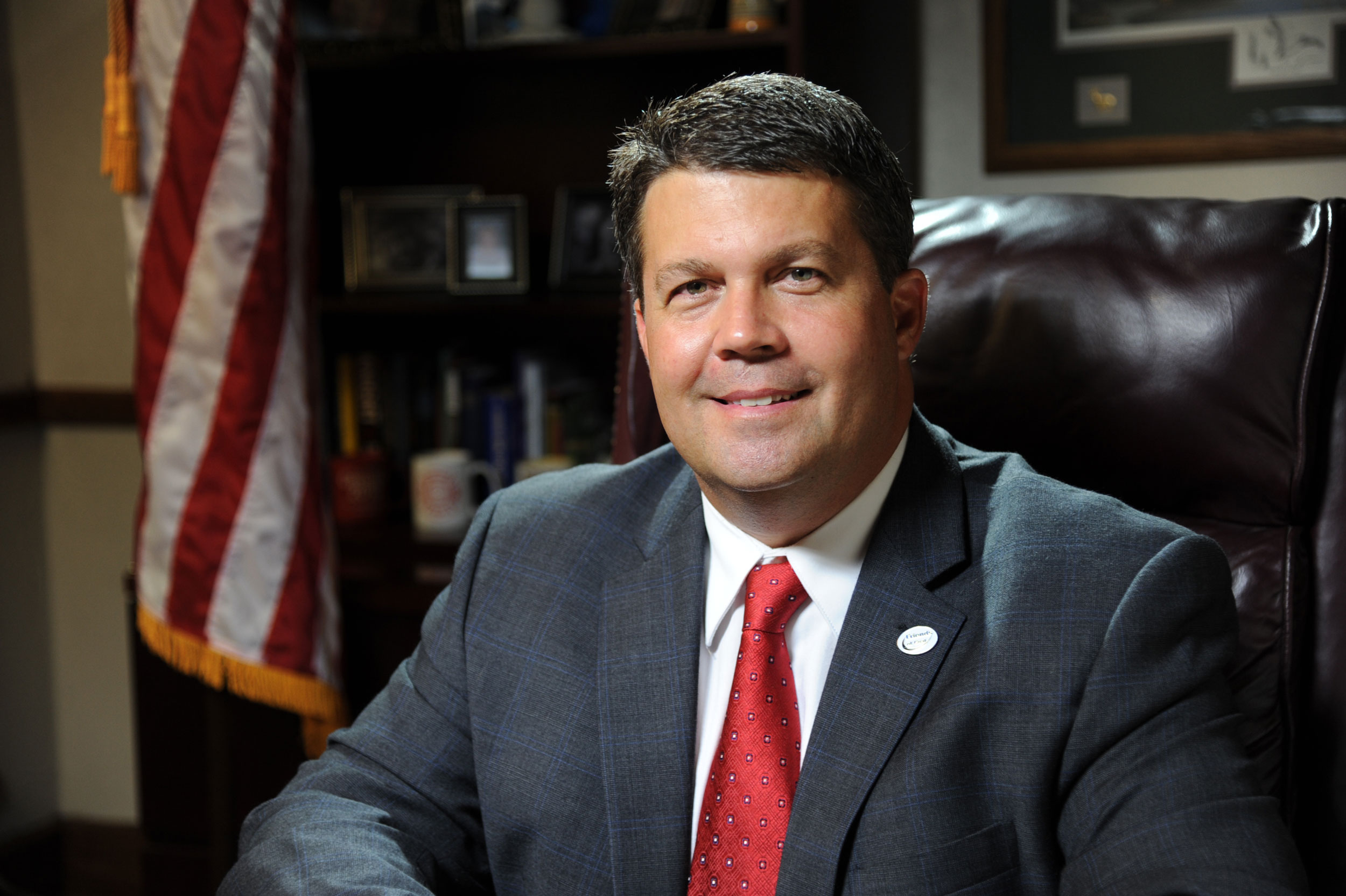

Judge/Executive of Trigg County
- Incumbent
- Assumed office January 2, 2023
- Preceded by: Hollis Alexander
- In office January 1, 2007 – December 31, 2012
- Preceded by: Berlin Moore
- Succeeded by: Hollis Alexander

Member of the Kentucky Senate from the 1st district
- In office January 1, 2013 – January 1, 2021
- Preceded by: Kenneth W. Winters
- Succeeded by: Jason Howell

Personal details
- Born: Stanley Harold Humphries; August 2, 1969 (age 57) Cadiz, Kentucky, U.S.
- Party: Republican
- Spouse: Kimberly Burnam Humphries (married 1993)
- Children: 3
- Education: Murray State University
- Occupation: Farmer, Teacher
- Website: www.lrc.ky.gov/...

Military service
- Branch/service: United States Army Reserve

Stanley Harold "Stan" Humphries (born August 2, 1969) is an American teacher, farmer, and politician. He represented District 1 in the Kentucky Senate. He was elected in 2012 to succeed fellow Republican Senator Kenneth W. Winters of Murray serving until January 1, 2021. He did not seek a third term in the senate in 2020.

Formerly, Humphries served as Judge-Executive of Trigg County, a position to which he was first elected in 2006. He resigned December 31, 2012, following his election to the state senate.

Humphries resides in his native Cadiz, Kentucky. He earned his bachelor's degree in education from Murray State University. Humphries and his wife Kim were married on July 24, 1993. They have three children, Steven (age 28–29), Lydia (age 25–26), and Luke (age 19–20).
