= Kentucky House of Representatives =

Lower house of the Kentucky General Assembly

Coordinates: 38°11′12.1″N 84°52′29.4″W

- Kentucky General Assembly

Type
- Type: Lower house
- Term limits: None

History
- New session started: January 6, 2026 (adjourned)

Leadership
- Speaker: David Osborne (R) since January 8, 2019
- Speaker pro tempore: David Meade (R) since January 8, 2019
- Majority Leader: Steven Rudy (R) since January 5, 2021
- Minority Leader: Pamela Stevenson (D) since January 7, 2025

Structure
- Seats: 100
- Political groups: Republican (80); Democratic (20)
- Length of term: 2 years

Elections
- Last election: November 3, 2026
- Next election: November 7, 2028
- Redistricting: Legislative control

Meeting place
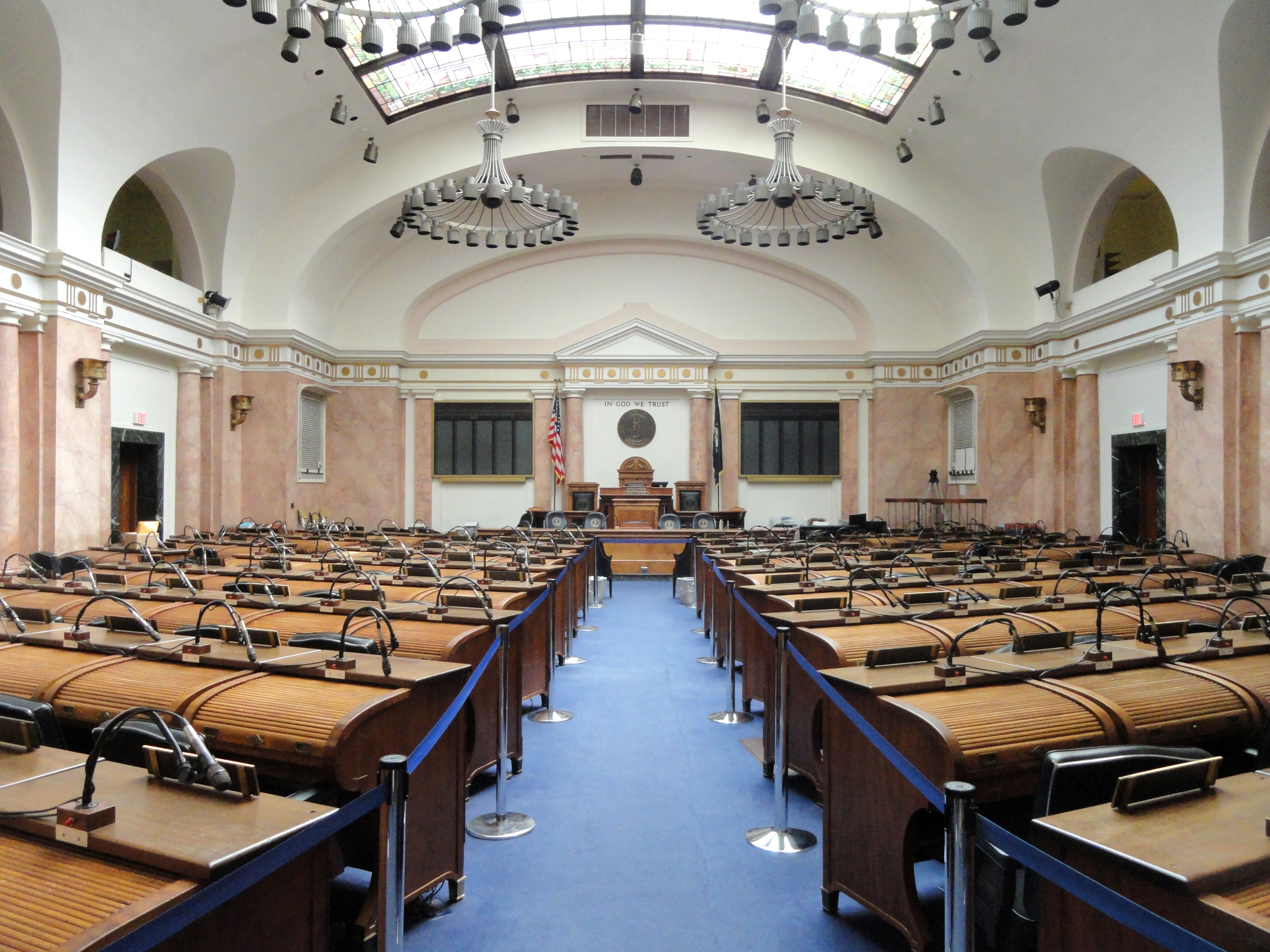
- House of Representatives Chamber; Kentucky State Capitol; Frankfort, Kentucky

Website
- Kentucky Legislative Research Commission

Rules
- Rules of the House of Representatives (2026)

The Kentucky House of Representatives is the lower house of the Kentucky General Assembly. It is composed of 100 Representatives elected from single-member districts throughout the Commonwealth. Not more than two counties can be joined to form a House district, except when necessary to preserve the principle of equal representation. Representatives are elected to two-year terms with no term limits. The Kentucky House of Representatives convenes at the State Capitol in Frankfort.

== History ==
The first meeting of the Kentucky House of Representatives was in Lexington, Kentucky, in 1792, shortly after statehood. During the first legislative session, legislators chose Frankfort to be the permanent state capital.

After women gained suffrage in Kentucky, Mary Elliott Flanery was elected as the first female member of the Kentucky House of Representatives. She took her seat in January 1922, and was the first woman elected to a Southern state legislature.

In 2017, the Republicans became the majority party in the House. They now hold a four-fifths supermajority in the chamber.

== Powers and legislative process ==
Section 47 of the Constitution of Kentucky stipulates that all bills for raising revenue must originate in the state House of Representatives.

== Membership ==
=== Current composition ===
House composition by district Held by Democrats Held by Republicans

Session	Party (Shading indicates majority caucus)		Total	Vacant
Session	Republican	Democratic	Total	Vacant
2015 session	46	54	100	0
2016 session	46	50	96	4
2017 session	64	36	100	0
2018 session	62	36	98	2
2019 session	61	39	100	0
2020 session	61	37	98	2
2021 session	75	25	100	0
2022 session	75	24	99	1
2023 session	80	20	100	0
2024 session	78	20	98	2
2025–2026 sessions	80	20	100	0
Latest voting share	80%	20%		

=== Terms and qualifications ===
According to Section 32 of the Kentucky Constitution, a state representative must: be a citizen of Kentucky, be at least 24 years old at the time of election, have resided in the state at least 2 years and the district at least 1 year prior to election. Per section 30 of the Kentucky Constitution, representatives are elected every two years in the November following a regular session of the General Assembly.

=== Leadership ===
The speaker of the Kentucky House of Representatives is the chief presiding officer of the Kentucky House. The speaker's official duties include maintaining order in the House, recognizing members during debate, appointing committee chairs and determining the composition of committees, and determining which committee has jurisdiction over which bill. Traditionally, the speaker has also served as chair of the Rules Committee and the Committee on Committees.

When the speaker is absent from the floor or otherwise unavailable, the speaker pro tempore fills in as the chief presiding officer of the House.

In addition to the speaker and speaker pro tem, each party caucus elects a floor leader, a whip, and caucus chair.

=== Leaders ===
Position	Name	Party	Residence	District
Speaker of the House	David Osborne	Republican	Prospect	59
Speaker Pro Tempore	David Meade	Republican	Stanford	80
Majority Floor Leader	Steven Rudy	Republican	Paducah	1
Majority Whip	Josh Bray	Republican	Mount Vernon	71
Majority Caucus Chair	Suzanne Miles	Republican	Owensboro	7
Minority Floor Leader	Pamela Stevenson	Democratic	Louisville	43
Minority Whip	Joshua Watkins	Democratic	Louisville	42
Minority Caucus Chair	Lindsey Burke	Democratic	Lexington	75

=== List of current representatives ===
District	Name	Party	Start	Residence	Counties
1	Steven Rudy	Republican	2005	Paducah	Ballard, Carlisle, Fulton, Hickman, McCracken
2	Kim Holloway	Republican	2025	Mayfield	Graves, McCracken
3	Randy Bridges	Republican	2019	Paducah	Livingston, McCracken
4	Wade Williams	Republican	2023	Earlington	Hopkins
5	Mary Beth Imes	Republican	2021	Murray	Calloway, Trigg
6	Chris Freeland	Republican	2019	Benton	Lyon, Marshall, McCracken
7	Suzanne Miles	Republican	2013	Owensboro	Daviess
8	Walker Thomas	Republican	2017	Hopkinsville	Caldwell, Christian, Trigg
9	Myron Dossett	Republican	2007	Pembroke	Christian
10	Josh Calloway	Republican	2021	Irvington	Breckinridge, Hardin
11	J. T. Payne	Republican	2025	Henderson	Henderson
12	Jim Gooch Jr.	Republican	1995	Providence	Crittenden, McLean, Union, Webster
13	DJ Johnson (Note: Johnson previously served in the house from 2017 to 2019.)	Republican	2021	Owensboro	Daviess
14	Scott Lewis	Republican	2019	Hartford	Daviess, Hancock, Ohio
15	Rebecca Raymer	Republican	2023	Morgantown	Butler, Muhlenberg
16	Jason Petrie	Republican	2017	Elkton	Christian, Logan, Todd
17	Robert Duvall	Republican	2023	Bowling Green	Warren
18	Samara Heavrin	Republican	2019	Leitchfield	Grayson, Hardin
19	Michael Meredith	Republican	2011	Oakland	Edmonson, Warren
20	Kevin Jackson	Republican	2023	Bowling Green	Warren
21	Amy Neighbors	Republican	2023	Edmonton	Adair, Cumberland, Metcalfe, Monroe
22	Shawn McPherson	Republican	2021	Scottsville	Allen, Simpson, Warren
23	Steve Riley	Republican	2017	Glasgow	Barren
24	Ryan Bivens	Republican	2025	Hodgenville	Green, Hart, LaRue
25	Steve Bratcher	Republican	2023	Elizabethtown	Hardin
26	Peyton Griffee	Republican	2024	Mount Washington	Bullitt, Hardin
27	Nancy Tate	Republican	2019	Brandenburg	Hardin, Meade
28	Jared Bauman	Republican	2023	Louisville	Jefferson
29	Chris Lewis	Republican	2025	Louisville	Jefferson
30	Daniel Grossberg	Democratic	2023	Louisville	Jefferson
31	Susan Witten	Republican	2023	Louisville	Jefferson
32	Tina Bojanowski	Democratic	2019	Louisville	Jefferson
33	Jason Nemes	Republican	2017	Middletown	Jefferson, Oldham, Shelby
34	Sarah Stalker	Democratic	2023	Louisville	Jefferson
35	Lisa Willner	Democratic	2019	Louisville	Jefferson
36	John Hodgson	Republican	2023	Fisherville	Jefferson
37	Emily Callaway	Republican	2023	Louisville	Bullitt, Jefferson
38	Rachel Roarx	Democratic	2023	Louisville	Jefferson
39	Matt Lockett	Republican	2021	Nicholasville	Fayette, Jessamine
40	Nima Kulkarni	Democratic	2019	Louisville	Jefferson
41	Mary Lou Marzian (Note: Marzian previously served in the house from 1994 to 2023.)	Democratic	2025	Louisville	Jefferson
42	Joshua Watkins	Democratic	2025	Louisville	Jefferson
43	Pamela Stevenson	Democratic	2021	Louisville	Jefferson
44	Beverly Chester-Burton	Democratic	2023	Shively	Jefferson
45	Adam Moore	Democratic	2025	Lexington	Fayette, Jessamine
46	Al Gentry	Democratic	2017	Louisville	Jefferson
47	Felicia Rabourn	Republican	2021	Turners Station	Carroll, Henry, Owen, Trimble
48	Ken Fleming (Note: Fleming previously served in the house from 2017 to 2019.)	Republican	2021	Louisville	Jefferson, Oldham
49	Thomas Huff	Republican	2019	Shepherdsville	Bullitt
50	Candy Massaroni	Republican	2023	Bardstown	Nelson
51	Michael Pollock	Republican	2021	Campbellsville	Marion, Taylor
52	Ken Upchurch (Note: Upchurch previously served in the house from 1999 to 2011.)	Republican	2013	Monticello	McCreary, Pulaski, Wayne
53	James Tipton	Republican	2015	Taylorsville	Anderson, Spencer
54	Daniel Elliott	Republican	2016	Danville	Boyle, Casey
55	Kim King	Republican	2011	Harrodsburg	Jessamine, Mercer, Washington
56	Daniel Fister	Republican	2021	Versailles	Franklin, Jessamine, Woodford
57	Erika Hancock	Democratic	2025	Frankfort	Franklin
58	Jennifer Decker	Republican	2021	Waddy	Shelby
59	David Osborne	Republican	2005	Prospect	Oldham
60	Marianne Proctor	Republican	2023	Union	Boone
61	Savannah Maddox	Republican	2019	Dry Ridge	Boone, Gallatin, Grant, Kenton
62	Tony Hampton	Republican	2025	Georgetown	Scott
63	Kim Banta	Republican	2019	Fort Mitchell	Boone, Kenton
64	Kimberly Poore Moser	Republican	2017	Taylor Mill	Kenton
65	Stephanie Dietz	Republican	2023	Edgewood	Kenton
66	T. J. Roberts	Republican	2025	Burlington	Boone
67	Matt Lehman	Democratic	2025	Newport	Campbell
68	Mike Clines	Republican	2023	Alexandria	Campbell
69	Steven Doan	Republican	2023	Erlanger	Boone, Kenton
70	William Lawrence	Republican	2021	Maysville	Bracken, Harrison, Mason, Robertson
71	Josh Bray	Republican	2021	Mount Vernon	Laurel, Madison, Pulaski, Rockcastle
72	Matthew Koch	Republican	2019	Paris	Bourbon, Fleming, Nicholas
73	Ryan Dotson	Republican	2021	Winchester	Clark, Fayette
74	David Hale	Republican	2015	Wellington	Bath, Menifee, Montgomery
75	Lindsey Burke	Democratic	2023	Lexington	Fayette
76	Anne Gay Donworth	Democratic	2025	Lexington	Fayette
77	George Brown	Democratic	2015	Lexington	Fayette
78	Mark Hart	Republican	2017	Falmouth	Boone, Campbell, Kenton, Pendleton
79	Chad Aull	Democratic	2023	Lexington	Fayette
80	David Meade	Republican	2013	Stanford	Garrard, Lincoln, Pulaski
81	Deanna Gordon	Republican	2019	Richmond	Madison
82	Nick Wilson	Republican	2023	Williamsburg	Laurel, Whitley
83	Josh Branscum	Republican	2021	Russell Springs	Clinton, Pulaski, Russell
84	Chris Fugate	Republican	2017	Chavies	Breathitt, Owsley, Perry
85	Shane Baker	Republican	2021	Somerset	Laurel, Pulaski
86	Tom Smith (Note: Smith previously served in the house from 1991 to 1993.)	Republican	2021	Corbin	Knox, Laurel
87	Adam Bowling	Republican	2019	Middlesboro	Bell, Harlan
88	Vanessa Grossl	Republican	2025	Georgetown	Fayette, Scott
89	Timmy Truett	Republican	2021	McKee	Jackson, Laurel, Lee, Madison, Wolfe
90	Derek Lewis	Republican	2019	London	Clay, Laurel, Leslie
91	Bill Wesley	Republican	2021	Ravenna	Estill, Madison, Powell
92	John Blanton	Republican	2017	Salyersville	Knott, Magoffin, Pike
93	Adrielle Camuel	Democratic	2023	Lexington	Fayette
94	Mitch Whitaker	Republican	2025	Fleming-Neon	Harlan, Letcher, Pike
95	Ashley Tackett Laferty	Democratic	2019	Martin	Floyd, Pike
96	Patrick Flannery	Republican	2021	Olive Hill	Boyd, Carter, Lewis
97	Bobby McCool	Republican	2019	Van Lear	Johnson, Martin, Pike
98	Aaron Thompson	Republican	2025	Russell	Boyd, Greenup
99	Richard White	Republican	2020	Morehead	Elliott, Morgan, Rowan
100	Scott Sharp	Republican	2021	Ashland	Boyd, Lawrence

=== Seating chart ===
				Miles	Bray	Bridges	Petrie	Pollock	Thomas	Sharp	Flannery
		Elliott	Bowling	Bauman	Willner	Jackson	McPherson	Fleming	Duvall	Stalker	Wesley	Truett	Fugate
	Hodgson	Bivens	Burke	Massaroni	Osborne	Fister	Riley	Upchurch	Raymer	Aull	Roberts	Grossl	Gordon	D. Lewis
		McCool	Calloway	Proctor	Griffee	Rabourn	Rudy	Hale	Clines	Thompson	Moore	Lawrence	Branscum
Smith	Blanton		Stevenson	Gentry	Whitaker	Bojanowski	S. Lewis	Heavrin	Witten	Hancock	Maddox	Meade		Koch	Banta
Huff	Dietz	Moser		Dotson	Tate	Neighbors	Wilson	Gooch	Kulkarni	C. Lewis	Nemes		Freeland	Watkins	Meredith
Marzian	Doan	Callaway	Hart		Baker	Lehman	Johnson	Lockett	Tackett Laferty	White		King	Roarx	Hampton	Tipton
	Dossett	Donworth	Chester-Burton	Brown		Imes	Decker	Holloway	Camuel		Bratcher	Payne	Grossberg	Williams
							Speaker; Osborne

== See also ==
- Kentucky General Assembly
- Kentucky Senate
- List of Kentucky General Assemblies
- Government of Kentucky
