= 2018 Kentucky House of Representatives election =

- November 6, 2018

All 100 seats in the Kentucky House of Representatives 51 seats needed for a majority
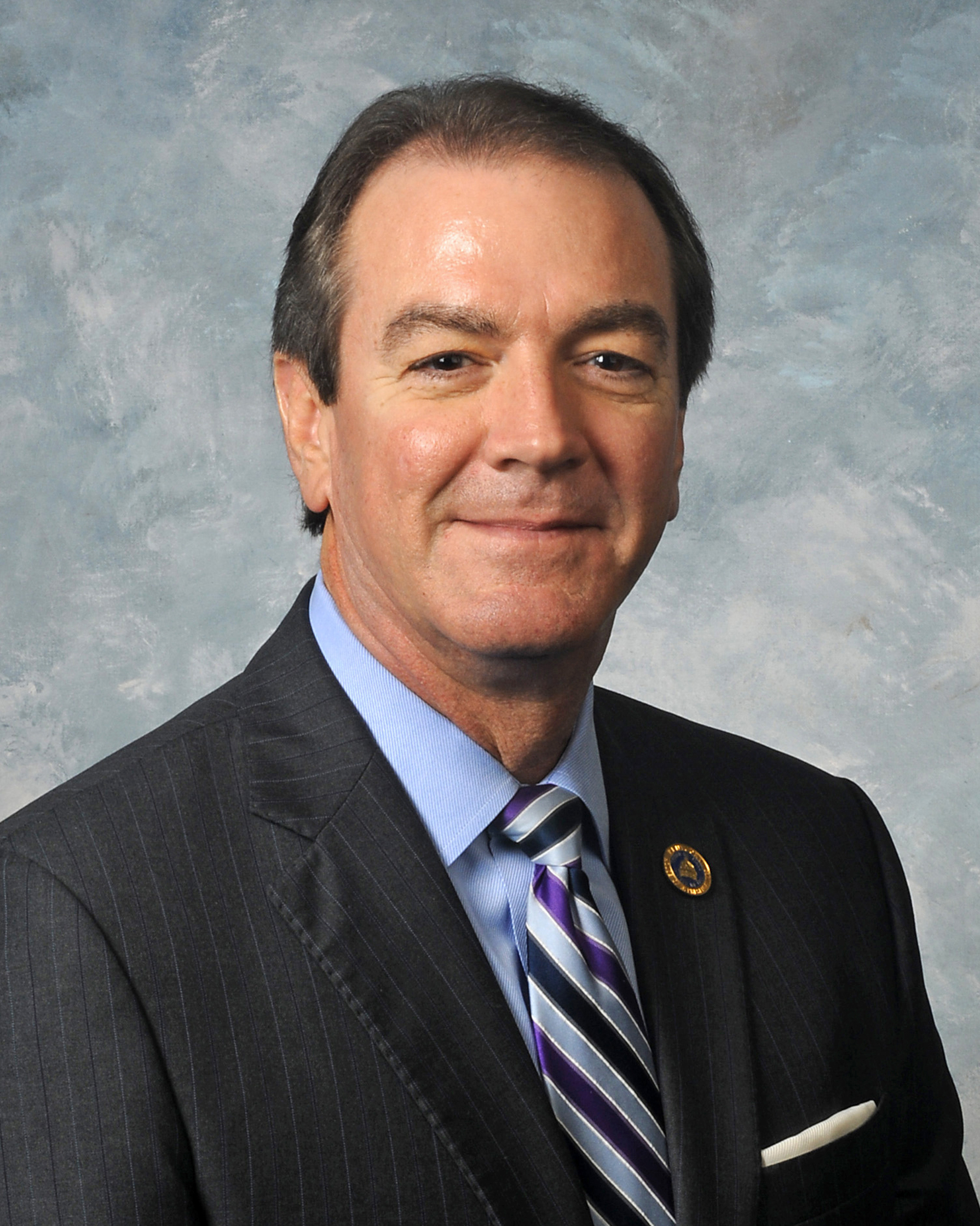

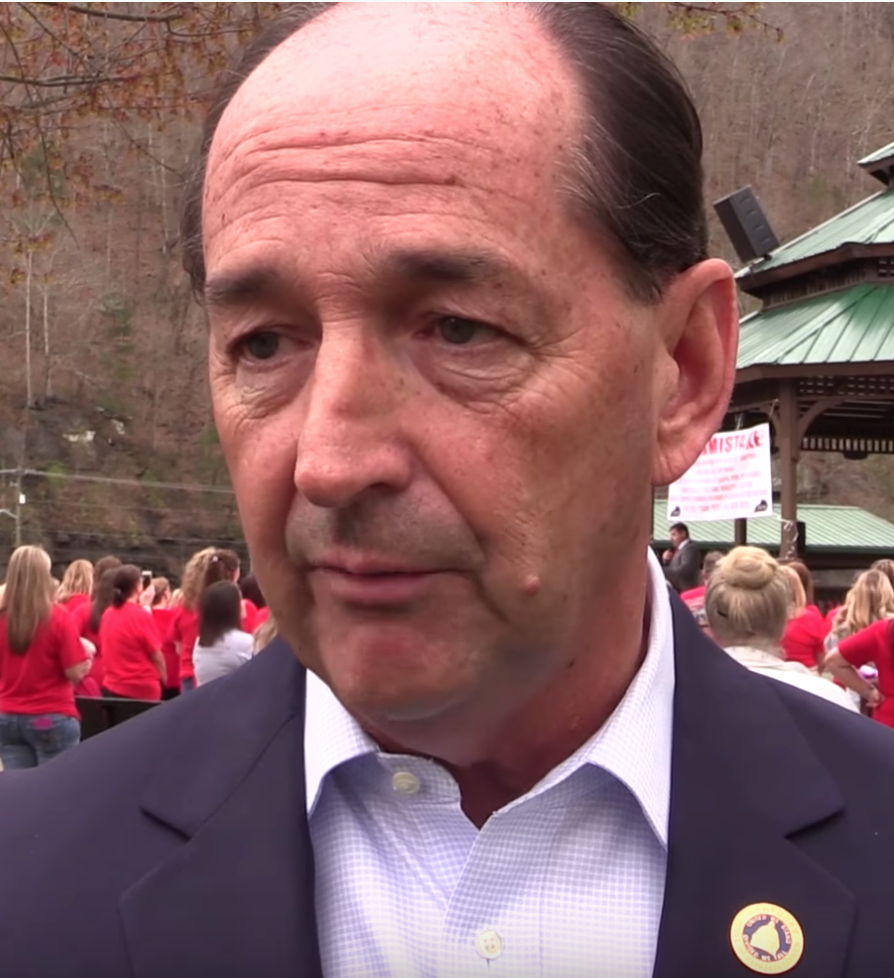
	Majority party	Minority party
Leader	David Osborne	Rocky Adkins
Party	Republican	Democratic
Last election	64	36
Seats before	63	37
Seats won	61	39
Seat change	▼2	▲2
Popular vote	814,787	699,377
Percentage	53.37%	45.81%
Swing	▼6.64%	▲5.88%
- Republican hold Republican gain Democratic hold Democratic gain 50–60% 60–70% 70–80% 80–90% >90% 50–60% 60–70% 70–80% >90%
Speaker before election
David Osborne
Republican
Elected Speaker
David Osborne
Republican

The 2018 Kentucky House of Representatives elections were held on November 6, 2018, as part of the biennial United States elections. All 100 of Kentucky's state representatives were up for reelection. In Kentucky, members of the House of Representatives serve two-year terms. Accordingly, they are up for reelection in both presidential and midterm election years.

Democrats, who had long been the dominant party at the state level in Kentucky, held a majority in the state house from 1922 to 2017. In 2016, Republicans made large gains in the chamber, winning a majority of 64 seats. Both parties flipped several seats in 2018, with Republicans grabbing six seats from the Democrats and Democrats taking eight from the Republicans, for a net gain of two Democratic seats. Many of the Democratic gains were in suburban areas, including around Louisville, Lexington, and Owensboro. Republicans made gains in some of Democrats' remaining rural districts, though they significantly underperformed in Appalachian Eastern Kentucky, where Democrats picked up multiple seats.

Several races were decided by extremely narrow margins. Four seats—Districts 13, 27, 91, and 96—were all decided by seven votes or fewer. Republicans ultimately maintained their majority in the chamber, winning 61 seats to the Democrats' 39.

== Overview ==
Party	Candidates		Votes	%	Seats		
Party	Opposed	Unopposed	Votes	%	Before	Won	+/−
Republican	90	3	814,787	53.37	63	61	-2
Democratic	85	7	699,377	45.81	37	39	+2
Independent	3	0	3,626	0.24	0	0	-
Libertarian	3	0	907	0.06	0	0	-
Write-in	8	0	8,120	0.53	N/A	0	N/A
Total	189	10	1,526,817	100.00	100	100	±0
Source: Kentucky Secretary of State

== Closest races ==
Seats where the margin of victory was under 10%:

1. District 13, 0.008% gain
2. District 96, 0.04% gain
3. District 27, 0.04% gain
4. District 91, 0.05% gain
5. District 81, 0.15%
6. District 88, 0.19% gain
7. District 48, 1.39% gain
8. District 33, 1.99%
9. District 45, 2.34%
10. District 74, 2.49%
11. District 10, 3.35%
12. District 72, 4.12% gain
13. District 8, 4.63%
14. District 22, 5.12%
15. District 3, 6.63% gain
16. District 29, 6.65%
17. District 20, 6.99%
18. District 15, 7.08%
19. District 32, 7.14% gain
20. District 11, 7.56% gain
21. District 100, 7.75%
22. District 47, 9.61%

== Predictions ==
Source	Ranking	As of
Governing	Safe R	October 8, 2018

== Crossover seats ==
20 districts voted for one party in the 2016 presidential election and another in the 2016 house election.

=== Democratic ===
This lists the districts in which Donald Trump won in 2016 but were represented by Democrats:

District		Incumbent		
#	Trump margin of victory in 2016	Member	Party	Incumbent margin of victory in 2016
3	R+22.60	Gerald Watkins	Democratic	D+10.72
6	R+50.74	Will Coursey	Democratic	D+9.22
10	R+37.00	Dean Schamore	Democratic	D+10.38
22	R+51.77	Wilson Stone	Democratic	Unopposed
27	R+34.03	Jeff Greer	Democratic	D+7.69
28	R+19.83	Charles Miller	Democratic	D+7.74
37	R+5.47	Jeffery Donohue	Democratic	D+4.01
39	R+33.20	Russ Meyer	Democratic	D+11.68
47	R+45.15	Rick Rand	Democratic	Unopposed
56	R+11.62	James Kay	Democratic	D+19.25
57	R+4.21	Derrick Graham	Democratic	Unopposed
67	R+4.64	Dennis Keene	Democratic	Unopposed
70	R+49.36	John Sims Jr.	Democratic	D+12.35
72	R+31.16	Sannie Overly	Democratic	D+8.50
87	R+66.22	Rick Nelson	Democratic	D+2.99
93	R+67.80	Chris Harris	Democratic	D+2.76
94	R+61.23	Angie Hatton	Democratic	D+1.45
99	R+39.52	Rocky Adkins	Democratic	D+31.99
100	R+35.92	Kevin Sinnette	Democratic	D+0.88

=== Republican ===
This lists the districts in which Hillary Clinton won in 2016 but were represented by Republicans:

District		Incumbent		
#	Clinton margin of victory in 2016	Member	Party	Incumbent margin of victory in 2016
32	D+0.72	Phil Moffett	Republican	Unopposed

== Special elections ==
=== District 49 special ===
Linda H. Belcher was elected on February 20, 2018, to fill the vacancy caused by the death of Dan Johnson in December 2017.

2018 Kentucky House of Representatives 49th district special election
Party	Candidate	Votes	%
Democratic	Linda H. Belcher	3,386	68.4
Republican	Rebecca Johnson	1,561	31.6
Total votes		4,947	100.0
Democratic gain from Republican			

=== District 89 special ===
Robert Goforth was elected on February 27, 2018, to fill the vacancy caused by the resignation of Marie Rader in December 2017.

2018 Kentucky House of Representatives 89th district special election
Party	Candidate	Votes	%
Republican	Robert Goforth	2,809	66.8
Democratic	Kelly Smith	1,399	33.2
Total votes		4,208	100.0
Republican hold			

== Election results ==
All results are official and certified by the Kentucky State Board of Elections.

=== District 1 ===
2018 Kentucky's 1st House of Representatives district election
Party	Candidate	Votes	%
Republican	Steven Rudy (incumbent)	11,050	66.99%
Democratic	Desiree Owen	5,445	33.01%
Total votes		16,495	100%
Republican hold			

=== District 2 ===
2018 Kentucky's 2nd House of Representatives district election
Party	Candidate	Votes	%
Republican	Richard Heath (incumbent)	10,880	68.85%
Democratic	Charlotte Goddard	4,922	31.15%
Total votes		15,802	100%
Republican hold			

=== District 3 ===
2018 Kentucky's 3rd House of Representatives district election
Party	Candidate	Votes	%
Republican	Randy Bridges	7,484	53.32%
Democratic	Martha B. Emmons	6,553	46.68%
Total votes		14,037	100%
Republican gain from Democratic			

=== District 4 ===
2018 Kentucky's 4th House of Representatives district election
Party	Candidate	Votes	%
Republican	Lynn Bechler (incumbent)	10,003	63.45%
Democratic	Abigail C. Barnes	5,763	36.55%
Total votes		15,766	100%
Republican hold			

=== District 5 ===
2018 Kentucky's 5th House of Representatives district election
Party	Candidate	Votes	%
Republican	Larry Elkins	9,326	58.05%
Democratic	David Ramey	6,739	41.95%
Total votes		16,065	100%
Republican hold			

=== District 6 ===
2018 Kentucky's 6th House of Representatives district election
Party	Candidate	Votes	%
Republican	Chris Freeland	12,236	64.53%
Democratic	Linda Story Edwards	6,727	35.47%
Total votes		18,693	100%
Republican gain from Democratic			

=== District 7 ===
2018 Kentucky's 7th House of Representatives district election
Party	Candidate	Votes	%
Republican	Suzanne Miles (incumbent)	10,723	61.54%
Democratic	Joy Gray	6,702	38.46%
Total votes		17,425	100%
Republican hold			

=== District 8 ===
2018 Kentucky's 8th House of Representatives district election
Party	Candidate	Votes	%
Republican	Walker Thomas (incumbent)	5,282	52.31%
Democratic	Jeffery R. Taylor	4,815	47.69%
Total votes		10,097	100%
Republican hold			

=== District 9 ===
2018 Kentucky's 9th House of Representatives district election
Party	Candidate	Votes	%
Republican	Myron Dossett (incumbent)	7,795	69.78%
Democratic	William Coleman	3,376	30.22%
Total votes		11,171	100%
Republican hold			

=== District 10 ===
2018 Kentucky's 10th House of Representatives district election
Party	Candidate	Votes	%
Democratic	Dean Schamore (incumbent)	8,573	51.67%
Republican	Josh Calloway	8,018	48.33%
Total votes		16,591	100%
Democratic hold			

=== District 11 ===
2018 Kentucky's 11th House of Representatives district election
Party	Candidate	Votes	%
Democratic	Rob Wiederstein	7,994	53.78%
Republican	James Buckmaster	6,870	46.22%
Total votes		14,864	100%
Democratic gain from Republican			

=== District 12 ===
2018 Kentucky's 12th House of Representatives district election
Party	Candidate	Votes	%
Republican	Jim Gooch Jr. (incumbent)	10,854	63.75%
Democratic	Bruce Kunze	6,171	36.25%
Total votes		17,025	100%
Republican hold			

=== District 13 ===
2018 Kentucky's 13th House of Representatives district election
Party	Candidate	Votes	%
Democratic	Jim Glenn	6,319	50.00%
Republican	DJ Johnson (incumbent)	6,318	50.00%
Total votes		12,637	100%
Democratic gain from Republican			

=== District 14 ===
2018 Kentucky's 14th House of Representatives district election
Party	Candidate	Votes	%
Republican	Scott Lewis	11,757	70.86%
Democratic	Elizabeth M. Belcher	4,836	29.14%
Total votes		16,593	100%
Republican hold			

=== District 15 ===
2018 Kentucky's 15th House of Representatives district election
Party	Candidate	Votes	%
Republican	Melinda Gibbons Prunty (incumbent)	8,530	53.54%
Democratic	Brent Yonts	7,402	46.46%
Total votes		16,593	100%
Republican hold			

=== District 16 ===
2018 Kentucky's 16th House of Representatives district election
Party	Candidate	Votes	%
Republican	Jason Petrie (incumbent)	10,041	87.18%
Write-In	Robert R. Nelson	1,477	12.82%
Total votes		11,518	100%
Republican hold			

=== District 17 ===
2018 Kentucky's 17th House of Representatives district election
Party	Candidate	Votes	%
Republican	Steve Sheldon	12,721	68.58%
Democratic	Malcolm Cherry	5,828	31.42%
Total votes		18,549	100%
Republican hold			

=== District 18 ===
2018 Kentucky's 18th House of Representatives district election
Party	Candidate	Votes	%
Republican	Tim Moore (incumbent)	10,210	68.61%
Democratic	Donielle M. Lovell	4,672	31.39%
Total votes		14,882	100%
Republican hold			

=== District 19 ===
2018 Kentucky's 19th House of Representatives district election
Party	Candidate	Votes	%
Republican	Michael Meredith (incumbent)	9,313	61.49%
Democratic	William "Bill" Fishback	5,832	38.51%
Total votes		15,145	100%
Republican hold			

=== District 20 ===
2018 Kentucky's 20th House of Representatives district election
Party	Candidate	Votes	%
Democratic	Patti Minter	6,253	53.49%
Republican	Benjamin T. Lawson	5,436	46.51%
Total votes		11,689	100%
Democratic hold			

=== District 21 ===
2018 Kentucky's 21st House of Representatives district election
Party	Candidate	Votes	%
Republican	Bart Rowland (incumbent)	10,907	71.15%
Democratic	Jarrett Cox	4,422	28.85%
Total votes		15,329	100%
Republican hold			

=== District 22 ===
2018 Kentucky's 22nd House of Representatives district election
Party	Candidate	Votes	%
Democratic	Wilson Stone (incumbent)	7,952	52.56%
Republican	Brian "Tiger" Gann	7,178	47.44%
Total votes		15,130	100%
Democratic hold			

=== District 23 ===
2018 Kentucky's 23rd House of Representatives district election
Party	Candidate	Votes	%
Republican	Steve Riley (incumbent)	11,019	72.01%
Democratic	LaToya Drake	4,282	27.99%
Total votes		15,301	100%
Republican hold			

=== District 24 ===
2018 Kentucky's 24th House of Representatives district election
Party	Candidate	Votes	%
Republican	Brandon Reed (incumbent)	8,981	56.78%
Democratic	Terry Mills	6,837	43.22%
Total votes		15,818	100%
Republican hold			

=== District 25 ===
2018 Kentucky's 25th House of Representatives district election
Party	Candidate	Votes	%
Republican	Jim DuPlessis (incumbent)	8,889	58.95%
Democratic	Tom Williamson	6,191	41.05%
Total votes		15,080	100%
Republican hold			

=== District 26 ===
2018 Kentucky's 26th House of Representatives district election
Party	Candidate	Votes	%
Republican	Russell Webber (incumbent)	10,330	99.37%
Write-In	Scott Matthew Hrebicik	65	0.63%
Total votes		10,395	100%
Republican hold			

=== District 27 ===
2018 Kentucky's 27th House of Representatives district election
Party	Candidate	Votes	%
Republican	Nancy Tate	6,938	50.02%
Democratic	Jeff Greer (incumbent)	6,932	49.98%
Total votes		13,870	100%
Republican gain from Democratic			

=== District 28 ===
2018 Kentucky's 28th House of Representatives district election
Party	Candidate	Votes	%
Democratic	Charles Miller (incumbent)	8,405	100%
Total votes		8,405	100%
Democratic hold			

=== District 29 ===
2018 Kentucky's 29th House of Representatives district election
Party	Candidate	Votes	%
Republican	Kevin Bratcher (incumbent)	10,570	53.33%
Democratic	Ronel A. Brown	9,251	46.67%
Total votes		19,821	100%
Republican hold			

=== District 30 ===
2018 Kentucky's 30th House of Representatives district election
Party	Candidate	Votes	%
Democratic	Tom Burch (incumbent)	9,935	75.51%
Republican	Christina O'Connor	3,223	24.49%
Total votes		13,158	100%
Democratic hold			

=== District 31 ===
2018 Kentucky's 31st House of Representatives district election
Party	Candidate	Votes	%
Democratic	Josie Raymond	10,512	59.68%
Republican	Leigh Boland Jones	7,101	40.32%
Total votes		17,613	100%
Democratic hold			

=== District 32 ===
2018 Kentucky's 32nd House of Representatives district election
Party	Candidate	Votes	%
Democratic	Tina Bojanowski	10,243	53.57%
Republican	Phil Moffett (incumbent)	8,877	46.43%
Total votes		19,120	100%
Democratic gain from Republican			

=== District 33 ===
2018 Kentucky's 33rd House of Representatives district election
Party	Candidate	Votes	%
Republican	Jason Nemes (incumbent)	11,056	51.00%
Democratic	Rob Walker	10,624	49.00%
Total votes		21,680	100%
Republican hold			

=== District 34 ===
2018 Kentucky's 34th House of Representatives district election
Party	Candidate	Votes	%
Democratic	Mary Lou Marzian (incumbent)	17,049	74.90%
Republican	Robert James Douglas	5,714	25.10%
Total votes		22,763	100%
Democratic hold			

=== District 35 ===
2018 Kentucky's 35th House of Representatives district election
Party	Candidate	Votes	%
Democratic	Lisa Willner	10,279	68.11%
Republican	Donna D. Lawlor	4,812	31.89%
Total votes		15,091	100%
Democratic hold			

=== District 36 ===
2018 Kentucky's 36th House of Representatives district election
Party	Candidate	Votes	%
Republican	Jerry T. Miller (incumbent)	13,869	58.26%
Democratic	Maurice M. Sweeney	9,936	41.74%
Total votes		23,805	100%
Republican hold			

=== District 37 ===
2018 Kentucky's 37th House of Representatives district election
Party	Candidate	Votes	%
Democratic	Jeffery Donohue (incumbent)	6,356	58.61%
Republican	Katharine Sweeton-Windsor	4,489	41.39%
Total votes		10,845	100%
Democratic hold			

=== District 38 ===
2018 Kentucky's 38th House of Representatives district election
Party	Candidate	Votes	%
Democratic	McKenzie Cantrell (incumbent)	7,116	62.73%
Republican	Karl Licht	4,228	37.27%
Total votes		11,344	100%
Democratic hold			

=== District 39 ===
2018 Kentucky's 39th House of Representatives district election
Party	Candidate	Votes	%
Democratic	Russ Meyer (incumbent)	12,099	100%
Total votes		12,099	100%
Democratic hold			

=== District 40 ===
2018 Kentucky's 40th House of Representatives district election
Party	Candidate	Votes	%
Democratic	Nima Kulkarni	8,619	74.15%
Republican	Joshua Neubert	3,004	25.85%
Total votes		11,623	100%
Democratic hold			

=== District 41 ===
2018 Kentucky's 41st House of Representatives district election
Party	Candidate	Votes	%
Democratic	Attica Scott (incumbent)	10,933	100%
Total votes		10,933	100%
Democratic hold			

=== District 42 ===
2018 Kentucky's 42nd House of Representatives district election
Party	Candidate	Votes	%
Democratic	Reginald Meeks (incumbent)	13,617	88.84%
Republican	Judy Martin Stallard	1,710	11.16%
Total votes		15,327	100%
Democratic hold			

=== District 43 ===
2018 Kentucky's 43rd House of Representatives district election
Party	Candidate	Votes	%
Democratic	Charles Booker	10,798	76.46%
Republican	Everett C. Corley	3,005	21.28%
Libertarian	John Hicks	319	2.26%
Total votes		14,122	100%
Democratic hold			

=== District 44 ===
2018 Kentucky's 44th House of Representatives district election
Party	Candidate	Votes	%
Democratic	Joni Jenkins (incumbent)	9,505	68.64%
Republican	Margaret Adkins	4,343	31.36%
Total votes		13,848	100%
Democratic hold			

=== District 45 ===
2018 Kentucky's 45th House of Representatives district election
Party	Candidate	Votes	%
Republican	Stan Lee (incumbent)	11,789	51.17%
Democratic	Josh Hicks	11,250	48.83%
Total votes		23,039	100%
Republican hold			

=== District 46 ===
2018 Kentucky's 46th House of Representatives district election
Party	Candidate	Votes	%
Democratic	Al Gentry (incumbent)	8,754	61.52%
Republican	James Stansbury	5,475	38.48%
Total votes		14,229	100%
Democratic hold			

=== District 47 ===
2018 Kentucky's 47th House of Representatives district election
Party	Candidate	Votes	%
Democratic	Rick Rand (incumbent)	8,644	54.81%
Republican	Mark A. Gilkison	7,128	45.19%
Total votes		15,772	100%
Democratic hold			

=== District 48 ===
2018 Kentucky's 48th House of Representatives district election
Party	Candidate	Votes	%
Democratic	Maria Sorolis	11,851	50.70%
Republican	Ken Fleming (incumbent)	11,525	49.30%
Total votes		23,376	100%
Democratic gain from Republican			

=== District 49 ===
2018 Kentucky's 49th House of Representatives district election
Party	Candidate	Votes	%
Republican	Thomas Huff	8,680	59.41%
Democratic	Linda H. Belcher (incumbent)	5,930	40.59%
Total votes		14,610	100%
Republican gain from Democratic			

=== District 50 ===
2018 Kentucky's 50th House of Representatives district election
Party	Candidate	Votes	%
Republican	Chad McCoy (incumbent)	9,129	55.28%
Democratic	James DeWeese	7,386	44.72%
Total votes		16,515	100%
Republican hold			

=== District 51 ===
2018 Kentucky's 51st House of Representatives district election
Party	Candidate	Votes	%
Republican	John "Bam" Carney (incumbent)	12,174	84.79%
Write-In	Richard Steele	2,184	15.21%
Total votes		14,358	100%
Republican hold			

=== District 52 ===
2018 Kentucky's 52nd House of Representatives district election
Party	Candidate	Votes	%
Republican	Ken Upchurch (incumbent)	10,188	72.97%
Democratic	Richard Steele	3,774	27.03%
Total votes		13,962	100%
Republican hold			

=== District 53 ===
2018 Kentucky's 53rd House of Representatives district election
Party	Candidate	Votes	%
Republican	James Tipton (incumbent)	13,813	71.14%
Democratic	Dustin Burley	5,605	28.86%
Total votes		19,418	100%
Republican hold			

=== District 54 ===
2018 Kentucky's 54th House of Representatives district election
Party	Candidate	Votes	%
Republican	Daniel Elliott (incumbent)	10,360	77.31%
Democratic	Lydia Coffey	3,041	22.69%
Total votes		13,401	100%
Republican hold			

=== District 55 ===
2018 Kentucky's 55th House of Representatives district election
Party	Candidate	Votes	%
Republican	Kim King (incumbent)	12,919	65.69%
Democratic	Cathy Carter	6,747	34.31%
Total votes		19,666	100%
Republican hold			

=== District 56 ===
2018 Kentucky's 56th House of Representatives district election
Party	Candidate	Votes	%
Democratic	Joe Graviss	11,343	57.56%
Republican	Daniel A. Fister	8,365	42.44%
Total votes		19,708	100%
Democratic hold			

=== District 57 ===
2018 Kentucky's 57th House of Representatives district election
Party	Candidate	Votes	%
Democratic	Derrick Graham (incumbent)	11,726	64.78%
Republican	Calen R. Studler	6,374	35.22%
Total votes		18,100	100%
Democratic hold			

=== District 58 ===
2018 Kentucky's 58th House of Representatives district election
Party	Candidate	Votes	%
Republican	Rob Rothenburger (incumbent)	11,131	64.33%
Democratic	Bobby Lacer	6,171	35.67%
Total votes		17,302	100%
Republican hold			

=== District 59 ===
2018 Kentucky's 59th House of Representatives district election
Party	Candidate	Votes	%
Republican	David Osborne (incumbent)	12,259	60.87%
Democratic	Diane Seaman	7,303	36.26%
Independent	Samantha Nicole Gerges	579	2.87%
Total votes		20,141	100%
Republican hold			

=== District 60 ===
2018 Kentucky's 60th House of Representatives district election
Party	Candidate	Votes	%
Republican	Sal Santoro (incumbent)	11,759	66.40%
Democratic	Jesse Parks	5,951	33.60%
Total votes		17,710	100%
Republican hold			

=== District 61 ===
2018 Kentucky's 61st House of Representatives district election
Party	Candidate	Votes	%
Republican	Savannah Maddox	11,312	67.77%
Democratic	Darrell L. Link	5,379	32.23%
Total votes		16,691	100%
Republican hold			

=== District 62 ===
2018 Kentucky's 62nd House of Representatives district election
Party	Candidate	Votes	%
Republican	Phillip Pratt (incumbent)	11,228	57.83%
Democratic	Jennifer Urie	8,187	42.17%
Total votes		19,415	100%
Republican hold			

=== District 63 ===
2018 Kentucky's 63rd House of Representatives district election
Party	Candidate	Votes	%
Republican	Diane St. Onge (incumbent)	10,903	59.77%
Democratic	Josh Blair	7,340	40.23%
Total votes		19,415	100%
Republican hold			

=== District 64 ===
2018 Kentucky's 64th House of Representatives district election
Party	Candidate	Votes	%
Republican	Kimberly Poore Moser (incumbent)	10,728	66.70%
Democratic	Larry Varney	5,357	33.30%
Total votes		16,085	100%
Republican hold			

=== District 65 ===
2018 Kentucky's 65th House of Representatives district election
Party	Candidate	Votes	%
Democratic	Buddy Wheatley	6,045	58.79%
Republican	Jordan Huizenga	3,848	37.42%
Independent	Alyssa Dara McDowell	389	3.78%
Total votes		10,282	100%
Democratic hold			

=== District 66 ===
2018 Kentucky's 66th House of Representatives district election
Party	Candidate	Votes	%
Republican	C. Ed Massey	9,262	55.30%
Democratic	Roberto Henriquez	4,497	26.85%
Independent	Stacie Earl	2,658	15.87%
Libertarian	Lex Hannan	328	1.96%
Write-in	Brett Wesseling	5	0.03%
Total votes		16,750	100%
Republican hold			

=== District 67 ===
2018 Kentucky's 67th House of Representatives district election
Party	Candidate	Votes	%
Democratic	Dennis Keene (incumbent)	7,288	59.78%
Republican	Bob Schrage	4,904	40.22%
Total votes		12,192	100%
Democratic hold			

=== District 68 ===
2018 Kentucky's 68th House of Representatives district election
Party	Candidate	Votes	%
Republican	Joseph Fischer (incumbent)	12,311	60.81%
Democratic	Jason Kilmer	7,933	39.19%
Total votes		20,244	100%
Republican hold			

=== District 69 ===
2018 Kentucky's 69th House of Representatives district election
Party	Candidate	Votes	%
Republican	Adam Koenig (incumbent)	7,222	55.40%
Democratic	Col Owens	5,815	44.60%
Total votes		13,037	100%
Republican hold			

=== District 70 ===
2018 Kentucky's 70th House of Representatives district election
Party	Candidate	Votes	%
Democratic	John Sims Jr. (incumbent)	11,029	100%
Total votes		11,029	100%
Democratic hold			

=== District 71 ===
2018 Kentucky's 71st House of Representatives district election
Party	Candidate	Votes	%
Republican	Travis Brenda	13,172	78.47%
Democratic	Mary J. Renfro	3,613	21.53%
Total votes		16,785	100%
Republican hold			

=== District 72 ===
2018 Kentucky's 72nd House of Representatives district election
Party	Candidate	Votes	%
Republican	Matthew Koch	8,578	51.28%
Democratic	Emily Ferguson	7,889	47.16%
Libertarian	Ann Cormican	260	1.55%
Total votes		16,727	100%
Republican gain from Democratic			

=== District 73 ===
2018 Kentucky's 73rd House of Representatives district election
Party	Candidate	Votes	%
Republican	Les Yates	10,856	64.28%
Democratic	Pat Banks	6,032	35.72%
Total votes		16,888	100%
Republican hold			

=== District 74 ===
2018 Kentucky's 74th House of Representatives district election
Party	Candidate	Votes	%
Republican	David Hale (incumbent)	9,163	51.24%
Democratic	James E. Davis	8,718	48.76%
Total votes		17,881	100%
Republican hold			

=== District 75 ===
2018 Kentucky's 75th House of Representatives district election
Party	Candidate	Votes	%
Democratic	Kelly Flood (incumbent)	11,258	100%
Total votes		11,258	100%
Democratic hold			

=== District 76 ===
2018 Kentucky's 76th House of Representatives district election
Party	Candidate	Votes	%
Democratic	Ruth Ann Palumbo (incumbent)	11,377	65.20%
Republican	Richard Marrs	6,073	34.80%
Total votes		17,450	100%
Democratic hold			

=== District 77 ===
2018 Kentucky's 77th House of Representatives district election
Party	Candidate	Votes	%
Democratic	George A. Brown Jr. (incumbent)	10,319	75.89%
Republican	Marianne Weiss	3,270	24.05%
Write-in	George Alexander III.	8	0.06%
Total votes		13,597	100%
Democratic hold			

=== District 78 ===
2018 Kentucky's 78th House of Representatives district election
Party	Candidate	Votes	%
Republican	Mark Hart (incumbent)	8,192	59.51%
Democratic	Gregory E. J. Coulson	5,574	40.49%
Total votes		13,766	100%
Republican hold			

=== District 79 ===
2018 Kentucky's 79th House of Representatives district election
Party	Candidate	Votes	%
Democratic	Susan Westrom (incumbent)	11,732	67.04%
Republican	Joshua Irvin	5,769	32.96%
Total votes		17,501	100%
Democratic hold			

=== District 80 ===
2018 Kentucky's 80th House of Representatives district election
Party	Candidate	Votes	%
Republican	David Meade (incumbent)	10,861	100%
Total votes		10,861	100%
Republican hold			

=== District 81 ===
2018 Kentucky's 81st House of Representatives district election
Party	Candidate	Votes	%
Republican	Deanna Frazier	8,111	50.07%
Democratic	Morgan H Eaves	8,087	49.93%
Total votes		16,198	100%
Republican hold			

=== District 82 ===
2018 Kentucky's 82nd House of Representatives district election
Party	Candidate	Votes	%
Republican	Regina Bunch (incumbent)	9,041	76.25%
Democratic	Stefanie J. E. Kingsley	2,816	23.75%
Total votes		11,857	100%
Republican hold			

=== District 83 ===
2018 Kentucky's 83rd House of Representatives district election
Party	Candidate	Votes	%
Republican	Jeff Hoover (incumbent)	14,167	100%
Total votes		14,167	100%
Republican hold			

=== District 84 ===
2018 Kentucky's 84th House of Representatives district election
Party	Candidate	Votes	%
Republican	Chris Fugate (incumbent)	7,992	55.66%
Democratic	Tom R. Pope	6,367	44.34%
Total votes		14,359	100%
Republican hold			

=== District 85 ===
2018 Kentucky's 85th House of Representatives district election
Party	Candidate	Votes	%
Republican	Tommy Turner (incumbent)	11,019	89.16%
Write-in	Mona Hampton-Eldridge	1,340	10.84%
Total votes		12,359	100%
Republican hold			

=== District 86 ===
2018 Kentucky's 86th House of Representatives district election
Party	Candidate	Votes	%
Republican	Jim Stewart (incumbent)	10,257	79.54%
Democratic	Debra Ferguson Payne	2,639	20.46%
Total votes		12,896	100%
Republican hold			

=== District 87 ===
2018 Kentucky's 87th House of Representatives district election
Party	Candidate	Votes	%
Republican	Adam Bowling	8,153	75.10%
Democratic	Dustin Allen	2,703	24.90%
Total votes		10,856	100%
Republican gain from Democratic			

=== District 88 ===
2018 Kentucky's 88th House of Representatives district election
Party	Candidate	Votes	%
Democratic	Cherlynn Stevenson	12,378	50.10%
Republican	Bill Farmer Jr.	12,330	49.90%
Total votes		24,708	100%
Democratic gain from Republican			

=== District 89 ===
2018 Kentucky's 89th House of Representatives district election
Party	Candidate	Votes	%
Republican	Robert Goforth (incumbent)	11,615	75.73%
Democratic	Kelly Smith	3,722	24.27%
Total votes		15,337	100%
Republican hold			

=== District 90 ===
2018 Kentucky's 90th House of Representatives district election
Party	Candidate	Votes	%
Republican	Derek Lewis	10,097	100%
Total votes		10,097	100%
Republican hold			

=== District 91 ===
Results by precinct: Howard: 50–60%; 60–70%; 70–80%; 80–90%; Herald: 50–60%; 60–70%; 70–80%; Tie: 50%

2018 Kentucky's 91st House of Representatives district election
Party	Candidate	Votes	%
Democratic	Cluster Howard	7,385	50.02%
Republican	Toby Herald (incumbent)	7,378	49.98%
Total votes		14,763	100%
Democratic gain from Republican			

=== District 92 ===
2018 Kentucky's 92nd House of Representatives district election
Party	Candidate	Votes	%
Republican	John Blanton (incumbent)	8,120	57.16%
Democratic	Ryan D. Mosley	6,086	42.84%
Total votes		14,206	100%
Republican hold			

=== District 93 ===
2018 Kentucky's 93rd House of Representatives district election
Party	Candidate	Votes	%
Democratic	Chris Harris (incumbent)	7,096	61.04%
Republican	Norma Kirk McCormick	4,529	38.96%
Total votes		11,625	100%
Democratic hold			

=== District 94 ===
2018 Kentucky's 94th House of Representatives district election
Party	Candidate	Votes	%
Democratic	Angie Hatton (incumbent)	10,036	100%
Total votes		10,036	100%
Democratic hold			

=== District 95 ===
2018 Kentucky's 95th House of Representatives district election
Party	Candidate	Votes	%
Democratic	Ashley Tackett Laferty	8,154	57.72%
Republican	Larry D. Brown (incumbent)	5,974	42.28%
Total votes		14,128	100%
Democratic gain from Republican			

=== District 96 ===
2018 Kentucky's 96th House of Representatives district election
Party	Candidate	Votes	%
Democratic	Kathy L. Hinkle	7,136	50.02%
Republican	Jill York (incumbent)	7,131	49.98%
Total votes		14,267	100%
Democratic gain from Republican			

=== District 97 ===
2018 Kentucky's 97th House of Representatives district election
Party	Candidate	Votes	%
Republican	Bobby McCool	8,514	57.77%
Democratic	Craig Lindon	6,225	42.23%
Total votes		14,739	100%
Republican hold			

=== District 98 ===
2018 Kentucky's 98th House of Representatives district election
Party	Candidate	Votes	%
Republican	Danny Bentley (incumbent)	8,131	55.40%
Democratic	R. B. McKenzie	6,547	44.60%
Total votes		14,678	100%
Republican hold			

=== District 99 ===
2018 Kentucky's 99th House of Representatives district election
Party	Candidate	Votes	%
Democratic	Rocky Adkins (incumbent)	9,871	100%
Total votes		9,871	100%
Democratic hold			

=== District 100 ===
2018 Kentucky's 100th House of Representatives district election
Party	Candidate	Votes	%
Democratic	Terri Branham Clark	7,497	53.88%
Republican	Brian Clark	6,418	46.12%
Total votes		13,915	100%
Democratic hold			
