= Russell Webber =

American politician (born 1967)

Member of the Kentucky House of Representatives
- In office January 1, 2013 – January 2, 2024
- Preceded by: Linda Belcher
- Succeeded by: Peyton Griffee
- Constituency: 49th district (2013–2015); 26th district (2015–2024)

Personal details
- Born: July 11, 1967 (age 59)
- Party: Republican
- Spouse: Sheri Webber
- Education: University of Kentucky

Russell Wayne Webber (born July 11, 1967) is an American politician and a former Republican member of the Kentucky House of Representatives, representing District 49 from 2013 until 2015 and District 26 from 2015 to 2024.

Webber resigned from the House to serve as deputy Kentucky State Treasurer.

== Education ==
Webber earned his BA from the University of Kentucky.

== Elections ==
- 1998 Webber initially challenged incumbent Republican Representative Allen Maricle in the 1998 Republican Primary, but lost to Representative Maricle, who went on to lose the November 3, 1998 General election to Democratic challenger Larry Belcher.
- 2000 To challenge Representative Larry Belcher, Webber was unopposed for the 2000 Republican Primary but lost the November 7, 2000 General election to Representative Belcher.
- 2002 When Representative Larry Belcher ran for Kentucky Senate and left the seat open, Webber ran in the 2002 Republican Primary but lost to Mary Harper, who went on to win the November 5, 2002 General election.
- 2010 To challenge Representative Linda Belcher, the widow of Larry Belcher, Webber won the May 18, 2010 Republican Primary with 1,243 votes (51.6%) but lost the November 2, 2010 General election to Representative Belcher.
- 2012 To challenge District 49 incumbent Democratic Representative Linda Belcher, Webber was unopposed for the May 22, 2012 Republican Primary and won the November 6, 2012 General election with 11,329 votes (52.8%) against Representative Belcher.

Kentucky House of Representatives
Preceded by Linda H. Belcher	Member of the Kentucky House of Representatives from the 49th district 2013–2015	Succeeded by Linda H. Belcher
Preceded by Tim Moore	Member of the Kentucky House of Representatives from the 26th district 2015–2024	Succeeded by Peyton Griffee
