= Tim Couch (politician) =

American politician (born 1961)

Member of the Kentucky House of Representatives from the 90th district
- In office January 1, 2003 – January 1, 2019
- Preceded by: Barbara Colter
- Succeeded by: Derek Lewis

Personal details
- Born: August 19, 1961 (age 65)
- Party: Republican
- Education: Hazard Community and Technical College; Cumberland College

Timothy Couch (born August 19, 1961) is an American politician and former Republican member of the Kentucky House of Representatives who represented district 90 from 2003 to 2019. He was defeated for renomination in 2018 by Derek Lewis.

== Education ==
Couch attended Hazard Community and Technical College and Cumberland College (now the University of the Cumberlands).

== Elections ==
- 2012 Couch was unopposed for both the May 22, 2012 Republican Primary and the November 6, 2012 General election, winning with 11,239 votes.
- 2002 Couch challenged District 90 incumbent Representative Barbara Colter in the three-way 2002 Republican Primary, winning with 8,389 votes (60.8%) and was unopposed for the November 5, 2002 General election, winning with 7,514 votes.
- 2004 Couch was challenged by former Representative Colter in a one-on-one rematch in the 2004 Republican Primary, winning with 4,185 votes (68.4%) and was unopposed for the November 2, 2004 General election, winning with 9,751 votes.
- 2006 Couch was unopposed for both the 2006 Republican Primary and the November 7, 2006 General election, winning with 9,167 votes.
- 2008 Couch was challenged in the three-way 2008 Republican Primary, winning with 3,002 votes (65.7%) and was unopposed for the November 4, 2008 General election, winning with 10,636 votes.
- 2010 Couch was unopposed for both the May 18, 2010 Republican Primary and the November 2, 2010 General election, winning with 8,841 votes.
