= Kentucky's 49th House of Representatives district =

American legislative district

Kentucky's 49th State House of Representatives district
Representative
Thomas Huff; R–Shepherdsville
since January 1, 2019
- Registration: 56.6% Republican; 32.1% Democratic; 10.5% No party preference
- Demographics: 93.2% White; 0.4% Black; 2.1% Hispanic; 0.4% Asian; 0.1% Other; 3.7% Multiracial
- Population (2024): 43,826
- Registered voters (2026): 35,112

Kentucky's 49th House of Representatives district is one of 100 districts in the Kentucky House of Representatives. It comprises part of Bullitt County. It has been represented by Thomas Huff (R–Shepherdsville) since 2019. As of 2024, the district had a population of 43,826.

== Voter registration ==
On January 1, 2026, the district had 35,112 registered voters, who were registered with the following parties.

Party	Registration	
Party	Voters	%
Republican	19,889	56.64
Democratic	11,288	32.15
Independent	1,638	4.67
Libertarian	189	0.54
Green	19	0.05
Constitution	18	0.05
Reform	4	0.01
Socialist Workers	2	0.01
"Other"	2,065	5.88
Total	35,112	100.00

== List of members representing the district ==
Member	Party	Years	Electoral history	District location
John Harper (Shepherdsville)	Republican	January 1, 1985 – December 31, 1993	Elected in 1984. Reelected in 1986. Reelected in 1988. Reelected in 1990. Reelected in 1992. Resigned after being elected Judge/Executive of Bullitt County.	1985–1993; Bullitt County (part).
John Harper (Shepherdsville)	Republican	January 1, 1985 – December 31, 1993	Elected in 1984. Reelected in 1986. Reelected in 1988. Reelected in 1990. Reelected in 1992. Resigned after being elected Judge/Executive of Bullitt County.	1993–1997; Bullitt County (part).
Allen Maricle (Pioneer Village)	Republican	January 13, 1994 – January 1, 1999	Elected to finish Harper's term. Reelected in 1994. Reelected in 1996. Lost reelection.	1993–1997; Bullitt County (part).
Allen Maricle (Pioneer Village)	Republican	January 13, 1994 – January 1, 1999	Elected to finish Harper's term. Reelected in 1994. Reelected in 1996. Lost reelection.	1997–2003
Larry Belcher (Shepherdsville)	Democratic	January 1, 1999 – January 1, 2003	Elected in 1998. Reelected in 2000. Retired to run for the Kentucky Senate.	1997–2003
Mary C. Harper (Shepherdsville)	Republican	January 1, 2003 – January 1, 2007	Elected in 2002. Reelected in 2004. Lost reelection.	2003–2015
Larry Belcher (Shepherdsville)	Democratic	January 1, 2007 – October 6, 2008	Elected in 2006. Died.	2003–2015
Linda H. Belcher (Shepherdsville)	Democratic	January 1, 2009 – January 1, 2013	Elected in 2008. Reelected in 2010. Lost reelection.	2003–2015
Russell Webber (Shepherdsville)	Republican	January 1, 2013 – January 1, 2015	Elected in 2012. Redistricted to the 26th district.	2003–2015
Linda H. Belcher (Shepherdsville)	Democratic	January 1, 2015 – January 1, 2017	Elected in 2014. Lost reelection.	2015–2023
Dan Johnson (Mount Washington)	Republican	January 1, 2017 – December 13, 2017	Elected in 2016. Died.	2015–2023
Linda H. Belcher (Shepherdsville)	Democratic	February 27, 2018 – January 1, 2019	Elected to finish Johnson's term. Lost reelection.	2015–2023
Thomas Huff (Shepherdsville)	Republican	January 1, 2019 – present	Elected in 2018. Reelected in 2020. Reelected in 2022. Reelected in 2024. Reelected in 2026.	2015–2023
Thomas Huff (Shepherdsville)	Republican	January 1, 2019 – present	Elected in 2018. Reelected in 2020. Reelected in 2022. Reelected in 2024. Reelected in 2026.	2023–present
