= Jeff Greer =

American politician (1964–2025)

Member of the Kentucky House of Representatives from the 27th district
- In office January 1, 2007 – January 1, 2019
- Preceded by: Gerry Lynn
- Succeeded by: Nancy Tate

Personal details
- Born: March 8, 1964 Battletown, Kentucky, U.S.
- Died: July 15, 2025 (aged 61) Brandenburg, Kentucky, U.S.
- Party: Democratic
- Education: Eastern Kentucky University
- Website: jeffgreerky.com

Jeffrey Greer (March 8, 1964 – July 15, 2025) was an American politician who served as a Democratic member of the Kentucky House of Representatives representing District 27 From January 2007 to January 2019. Greer was defeated for reelection in 2018 by Republican challenger Nancy Tate; he lost by six votes.

Greer was born in Battletown, Kentucky, on March 8, 1964. He earned his BA in business administration from Eastern Kentucky University. Greer died in Brandenburg, Kentucky, on July 15, 2025, at the age of 61.

== Elections ==
Greer challenged District 27 incumbent Republican Representative Gerry Lynn in 2006. Greer was unopposed for the 2006 Democratic Primary and won the November 7, 2006, general election with 5,888 votes (53.4%) against Representative Lynn.

Greer was unopposed for both the 2008 Democratic Primary and the November 4, 2008, general election, winning with 10,827 votes.

Greer was unopposed for the May 18, 2010, Democratic Primary and won the November 2, 2010, general election with 6,219 votes (50.5%) against Republican nominee Dalton Jantzen.

In 2012, Greer and returning 2010 Republican challenger Dalton Jantzen were both unopposed for their May 22, 2012, primaries, setting up a rematch; Greer won the November 6, 2012, general election with 7,548 votes (51.0%) against Jantzen.
