= Kentucky's 27th House of Representatives district =

American legislative district

Kentucky's 27th State House of Representatives district
Representative
Nancy Tate; R–Brandenburg
since January 1, 2019
- Registration: 48.3% Republican; 38.3% Democratic; 12.5% No party preference
- Demographics: 78.2% White; 9.2% Black; 6.3% Hispanic; 1.5% Asian; 0.1% Native American; 0.2% Hawaiian/Pacific Islander; 0.3% Other; 4.2% Multiracial
- Population (2024): 46,987
- Registered voters (2026): 32,829

Kentucky's 27th House of Representatives district is one of 100 districts in the Kentucky House of Representatives. Located in the central part of the state, it comprises Meade and part of Hardin Counties. It has been represented by Nancy Tate (R–Brandenburg) since 2019. As of 2024, the district had a population of 46,987.

== Voter registration ==
On January 1, 2026, the district had 32,829 registered voters, who were registered with the following parties.

Party	Registration	
Party	Voters	%
Republican	15,861	48.31
Democratic	12,585	38.34
Independent	1,814	5.53
Libertarian	208	0.63
Green	28	0.09
Constitution	27	0.08
Socialist Workers	9	0.03
Reform	4	0.01
"Other"	2,293	6.98
Total	32,829	100.00

== List of members representing the district ==
Member	Party	Years	Electoral history	District location
Bill Lile (Valley Station)	Republican	January 1, 1972 – January 1, 1974	Elected in 1971. Lost reelection.	1972–1974; Hardin (part) and Jefferson (part) Counties.
Archie Romines (Valley Station)	Democratic	January 1, 1974 – January 1, 1982	Elected in 1973. Reelected in 1975. Reelected in 1977. Reelected in 1979. Lost reelection.	1974–1985; Hardin (part) and Jefferson (part) Counties.
Bill Lile (Valley Station)	Republican	January 1, 1982 – January 1, 1985	Elected in 1981. Redistricted to the 28th district.	1974–1985; Hardin (part) and Jefferson (part) Counties.
Mark S. Brown (Brandenburg)	Democratic	January 1, 1985 – January 1, 1999	Elected in 1984. Reelected in 1986. Reelected in 1988. Reelected in 1990. Reelected in 1992. Reelected in 1994. Reelected in 1996. Retired to run for Judge/Executive of Meade County.	1985–1993; Bullitt (part), Hardin (part), and Meade (part) Counties.
Mark S. Brown (Brandenburg)	Democratic	January 1, 1985 – January 1, 1999	Elected in 1984. Reelected in 1986. Reelected in 1988. Reelected in 1990. Reelected in 1992. Reelected in 1994. Reelected in 1996. Retired to run for Judge/Executive of Meade County.	1993–1997; Bullitt (part), Hardin (part), and Meade (part) Counties.
Mark S. Brown (Brandenburg)	Democratic	January 1, 1985 – January 1, 1999	Elected in 1984. Reelected in 1986. Reelected in 1988. Reelected in 1990. Reelected in 1992. Reelected in 1994. Reelected in 1996. Retired to run for Judge/Executive of Meade County.	1997–2003
Jim Thompson (Battletown)	Democratic	January 1, 1999 – January 1, 2005	Elected in 1998. Reelected in 2000. Reelected in 2002. Lost reelection.	1997–2003
Jim Thompson (Battletown)	Democratic	January 1, 1999 – January 1, 2005	Elected in 1998. Reelected in 2000. Reelected in 2002. Lost reelection.	2003–2015
Gerry Lynn (Brandenburg)	Republican	January 1, 2005 – January 1, 2007	Elected in 2004. Lost reelection.	2003–2015
Jeff Greer (Brandenburg)	Democratic	January 1, 2007 – January 1, 2019	Elected in 2006. Reelected in 2008. Reelected in 2010. Reelected in 2012. Reelected in 2014. Reelected in 2016. Lost reelection.	2003–2015
Jeff Greer (Brandenburg)	Democratic	January 1, 2007 – January 1, 2019	Elected in 2006. Reelected in 2008. Reelected in 2010. Reelected in 2012. Reelected in 2014. Reelected in 2016. Lost reelection.	2015–2023
Nancy Tate (Brandenburg)	Republican	January 1, 2019 – present	Elected in 2018. Reelected in 2020. Reelected in 2022. Reelected in 2024. Retired.	2015–2023
Nancy Tate (Brandenburg)	Republican	January 1, 2019 – present	Elected in 2018. Reelected in 2020. Reelected in 2022. Reelected in 2024. Retired.	2023–present
Joseph Redmon (Brandenburg)	Republican	Assuming office January 1, 2027	Elected in 2026.	2023–present
