= Donald Farley =

Donald Farley may refer to:

- Donald Farley (skier) (1970–2016), Canadian cross-country skier
- Donald T. Farley (1933–2018), American physicist and professor of engineering
- Donald B. Farley (1935–1996), American politician
