= John Harper (Kentucky politician) =

American politician

John David Harper

Judge/Executive of Bullitt County
- In office January 3, 1994 – January 4, 1999

Member of the Kentucky House of Representatives from the 49th district
- In office January 1, 1985 – December 31, 1993
- Preceded by: Frank J. Smith
- Succeeded by: Allen Maricle

Personal details
- Born: May 3, 1930 Park Ridge, Illinois, U.S.
- Died: June 15, 2001 (aged 71) Louisville, Kentucky, U.S.
- Resting place: Resthaven Memorial Park in Louisville, Kentucky
- Party: Republican; Gubernatorial nominee, 1987
- Spouse: Mary Catherine Wigginton Harper
- Children: I. W. Harper (deceased) Alex Harper David Harper
- Education: Louisville Male High School
- Profession: Engineer; Inventor

Military service
- Branch/service: United States Air Force
- Battles/wars: Korean War

John David Harper (May 3, 1930 – June 15, 2001) was a five-term member of the Kentucky House of Representatives from Bullitt County and the 1987 Republican nominee for governor of Kentucky. Harper agreed to run for governor after the expected choice of party leaders, Lexington attorney Larry Forgy, surprisingly dropped out of the race because of fundraising problems. Harper lost to Democrat Wallace G. Wilkinson in a record landslide. Wilkinson carried 115 of Kentucky's 120 counties and won 504,367 votes (64.9 percent) to Harper's 273,035 (35.1 percent). Of the five counties Harper carried, one was his home county of Bullitt, and another was Wilkinson's county of residence, Fayette.

A son of David Harper and the former Frances Freeland, John Harper was a native of the Chicago suburb of Park Ridge, Illinois. The family subsequently moved to Louisville, where John Harper graduated from Louisville Male High School in 1948 and was later named to the school's Hall of Fame. Harper was thereafter self-educated as an engineer and inventor, having held twenty-five patents. After graduating from high school, he joined the United States Air Force, serving one year on active duty and six in the reserves. While in the Air Force reserves, he attended the University of Louisville. During the Korean War, he was recalled to active duty and trained in radio relay at Fort Bragg, North Carolina.

Harper and his wife, the former Mary Catherine Wigginton, had three sons, the late I. W. Harper, Alex Harper, and David Harper.

Harper's first run for office came in 1981, when he lost a bid to become Bullitt County's first Republican judge/executive. But he returned in 1984 to claim the House seat for the first of his five terms, defeating Democratic incumbent Frank J. Smith.

In 1993, he was elected Bullitt County Judge/Executive, a historic victory as the first Republican to win that office, just as he had been the first Republican to win his House seat. Harper served only one term as county judge and declined to run for a second in 1998 because of declining health. After Harper's death in Louisville, his widow, Mary, won her husband's former House seat in 2002 and was re-elected to a second term in 2004.

Harper died in Louisville at the age of seventy-one. A Roman Catholic, he is interred at Resthaven Memorial Park in Louisville. Thereafter, the Kentucky House of Representatives passed a resolution to honor Harper.

Party political offices
Preceded by Jim Bunning	Republican nominee for Governor of Kentucky; 1987	Succeeded by Larry Hopkins
