= Barbara Colter =

American politician (born 1941)

Member of the Kentucky House of Representatives from the 90th district
- In office January 1, 1995 – January 1, 2003
- Preceded by: Stephen Keith
- Succeeded by: Tim Couch

Personal details
- Born: June 3, 1941 (age 85) Berea, Kentucky, U.S.
- Party: Republican
- Spouse: Hugh
- Children: 3

Barbara Colter (born June 3, 1941) is an American politician from Kentucky who was a member of the Kentucky House of Representatives from 1995 to 2003. Colter was first elected in 1994 after incumbent representative Stephen Keith retired. She was defeated for renomination in 2002 by Tim Couch.
