= Derek Lewis (American politician) =

American politician

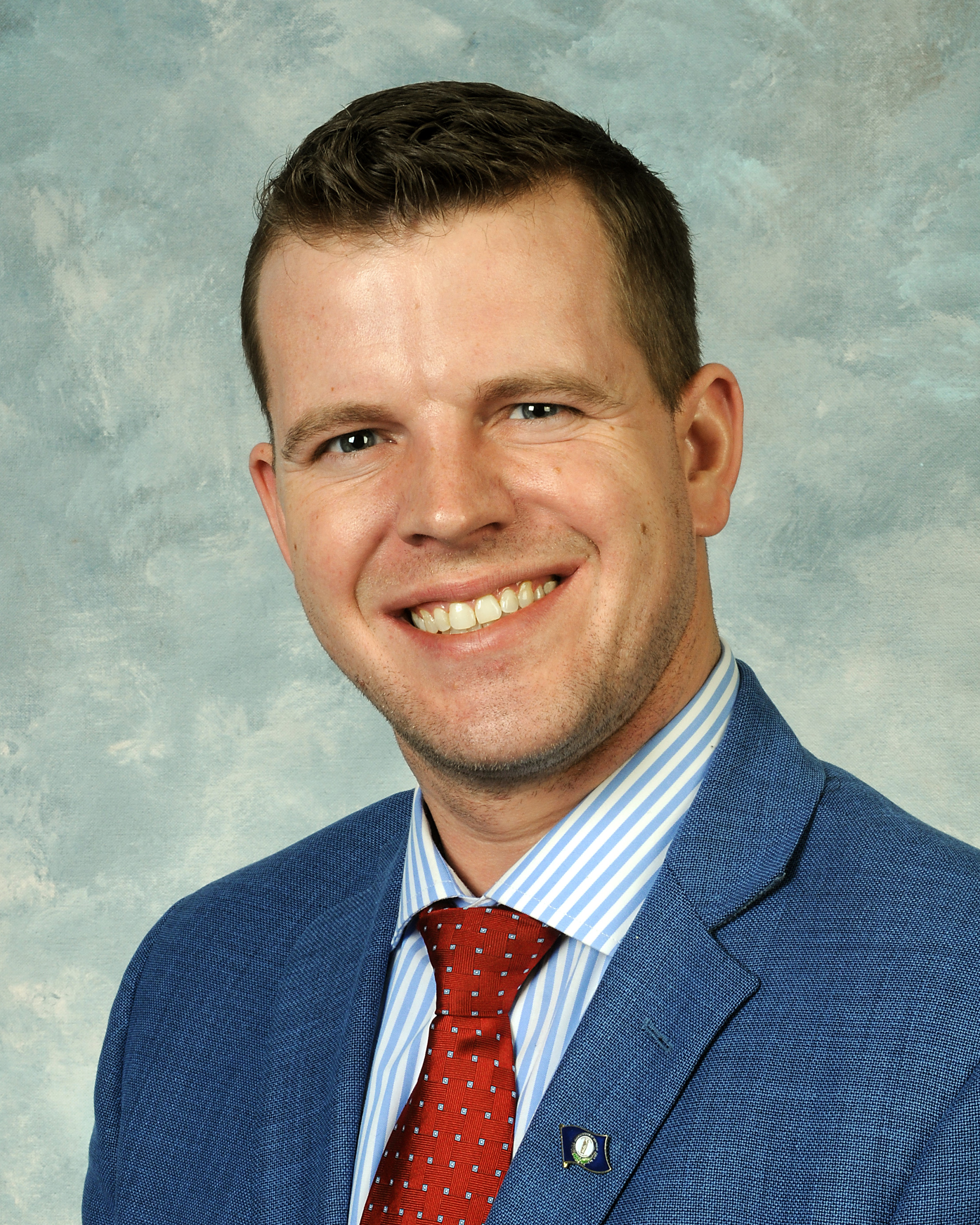

Member of the Kentucky House of Representatives from the 90th district
- Incumbent
- Assumed office January 1, 2019
- Preceded by: Tim Couch

Personal details
- Born: London, Kentucky
- Party: Republican
- Spouse: Brittany Lewis
- Children: 2
- Education: University of the Cumberlands (BS); Western Kentucky University (MBA)
- Profession: Business owner
- Committees: Administrative Regulation Review Subcommittee (Co-Chair); Banking & Insurance; Judiciary; Transportation

Derek Joel Lewis (born October 31, 1986) is an American politician who has served as a Republican member of the Kentucky House of Representatives from Kentucky's 90th House district since January 2019. His district includes Clay and Leslie counties as well as part of Laurel County.

== Background ==
Lewis was born in London, Kentucky. He earned a Bachelor of Science in accounting and communication arts from the University of the Cumberlands and a Master of Business Administration from Western Kentucky University.

He owns numerous small businesses such as a handyman service, pharmacy, and residential real estate.

He is a Baptist.

== Political career ==
=== Drinking and driving controversy ===
On April 16, 2020, two hours after the adjournment of the 2020 Kentucky General Assembly, Lewis was arrested and charged with driving under the influence. He was found in a ditch, and appeared to be intoxicated. The trial was originally scheduled for September 23, 2020; after being postponed three times, it was scheduled for May 19, 2021. Lewis was found not guilty, with a key part of his defense being a 2021 Kentucky Supreme Court ruling decided that Lewis' refusal to submit to a blood test could not be presented by prosecutors as evidence of guilt.

=== Elections ===
- 2018 Lewis won the 2018 Republican primary with 6,574 votes (54.4%) against incumbent Tim Couch and was unopposed in the 2018 Kentucky House of Representatives election, winning with 10,097 votes.
- 2020 Lewis was unopposed in the 2020 Republican primary and won the 2020 Kentucky House of Representatives election with 12,656 votes (74.4%) against Democratic candidate Ralph Hoskins.
- 2022 Lewis was unopposed in both the 2022 Republican primary and the 2022 Kentucky House of Representatives election, winning the latter with 11,092 votes.
- 2024 Lewis was unopposed in both the 2024 Republican primary and the 2024 Kentucky House of Representatives election, winning the latter with 16,293 votes.

Kentucky House of Representatives
| Preceded by Tim Couch | Member of the Kentucky House of Representatives; 2019–present | Succeeded by incumbent |
