= Stephen Keith =

American politician (1942–2024)

Member of the Kentucky House of Representatives from the 90th district
- In office January 1, 1985 – January 1, 1995
- Preceded by: Randy Moore
- Succeeded by: Barbara Colter

Personal details
- Born: October 16, 1942
- Died: January 30, 2024 (aged 81)
- Party: Republican

Stephen Conrad "Connie" Keith (October 16, 1942 – January 30, 2024) was an American politician from Kentucky who was a member of the Kentucky House of Representatives from 1985 to 1995. Keith was first elected in 1984 after defeating incumbent representative Randy Moore in the May primary election. He retired from the house in 1994. Keith died on January 30, 2024, at the age of 81.
