= John Vincent (Kentucky politician) =

American politician

Judge of the 32nd Kentucky Circuit Court
- Incumbent
- Assumed office January 16, 2018
- Preceded by: C. David Hagerman

Member of the Kentucky House of Representatives from the 100th district
- In office June 1996 – January 1, 2009
- Preceded by: Don Farley
- Succeeded by: Kevin Sinnette

Personal details
- Party: Republican

John Vincent (born October 5, 1959) is an American politician and jurist from Kentucky who was a member of the Kentucky House of Representatives from 1996 to 2009. Since 2018 he has been a judge of the 32nd Kentucky Circuit Court.

Vincent was first elected to the house in a June 1996 special election following the death of incumbent representative Don Farley. He did not seek reelection in 2008 and was succeeded by Democrat Kevin Sinnette.

In January 2018 he was appointed to the court by governor Matt Bevin in order to fill the vacancy caused by the resignation of C. David Hagerman. He was elected to the remainder of the term in November 2018 and to a full eight-year term in 2022.
