= Nancy Tate =

American politician (born 1964)

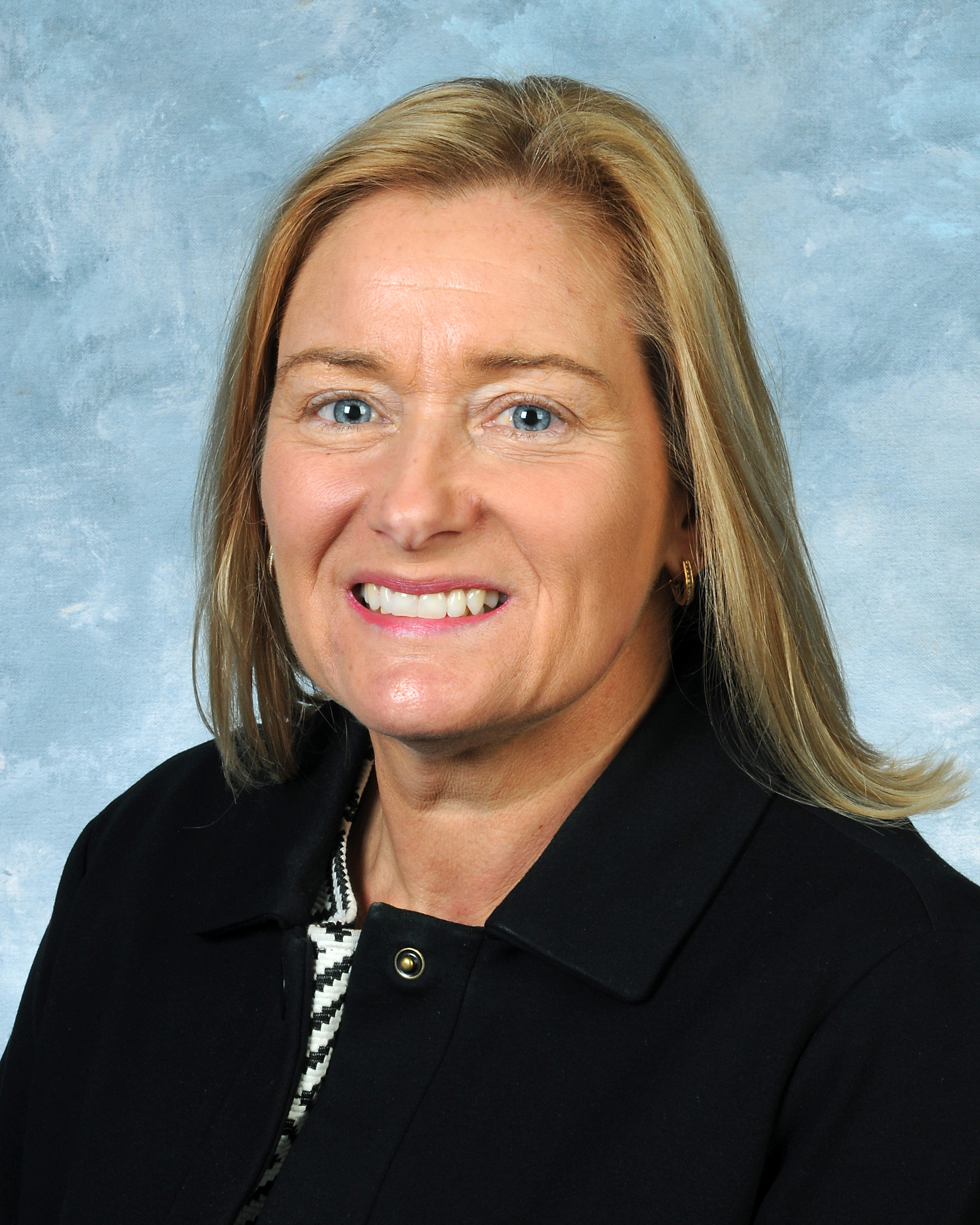

Member of the Kentucky House of Representatives from the 27th district
- Incumbent
- Assumed office January 1, 2019
- Preceded by: Jeff Greer
- Succeeded by: Joseph Redmon (elect)

Personal details
- Born: December 4, 1964 (age 61)
- Party: Republican
- Education: Mid-Continent University (BBA); George Washington University (MPM)
- Committees: Capital Planning Advisory Board (Co-Chair); Agriculture; Small Business & Information Technology; State Government
- Website: tateforkentucky.com

Nancy Jones Tate (born December 4, 1964) is an American politician and Republican member of the Kentucky House of Representatives from District 27. Her district includes all of Meade County as well as the northern portion of Hardin County, including the cities of Radcliff and Fort Knox.

== Background ==
Tate earned a Bachelor of Business Administration from Mid-Continent University before earning a Master of Project Management from George Washington University. Before entering politics, she worked for the United Parcel Service.

She is a board member of Kentucky Right to Life and president of its local Meade-Breck Chapter.

== Political career ==
=== Positions ===
Tate holds staunch anti-abortion views, chairing the Kentucky House's pro-life caucus. In 2022, she promoted a constitutional amendment that would have clarified the Constitution of Kentucky does not "secure or protect a right to abortion".

=== Elections ===
- 2018 Tate won the 2018 Republican primary with 1,355 votes (55.3%) against opponent Rachelle Frazier. Tate won the 2018 Kentucky House of Representatives election against Democratic incumbent Jeff Greer, winning with 6,938 votes and by a margin of six votes.
- 2020 Tate was unopposed in the 2020 Republican primary, and won the 2020 Kentucky House of Representatives election against Democratic candidate Brian Chism, winning with 11,179 votes (58.3%).
- 2022 Tate was unopposed in both the 2022 Republican primary and the 2022 Kentucky House of Representatives election, winning with 9,365 votes.
- 2024 Tate was unopposed in the 2024 Republican primary and won the 2024 Kentucky House of Representatives election with 11,980 votes (62.9%) against Democratic candidate Tyler Chapman.
