= Kentucky Center for Investigative Reporting =

Nonprofit digital newsroom

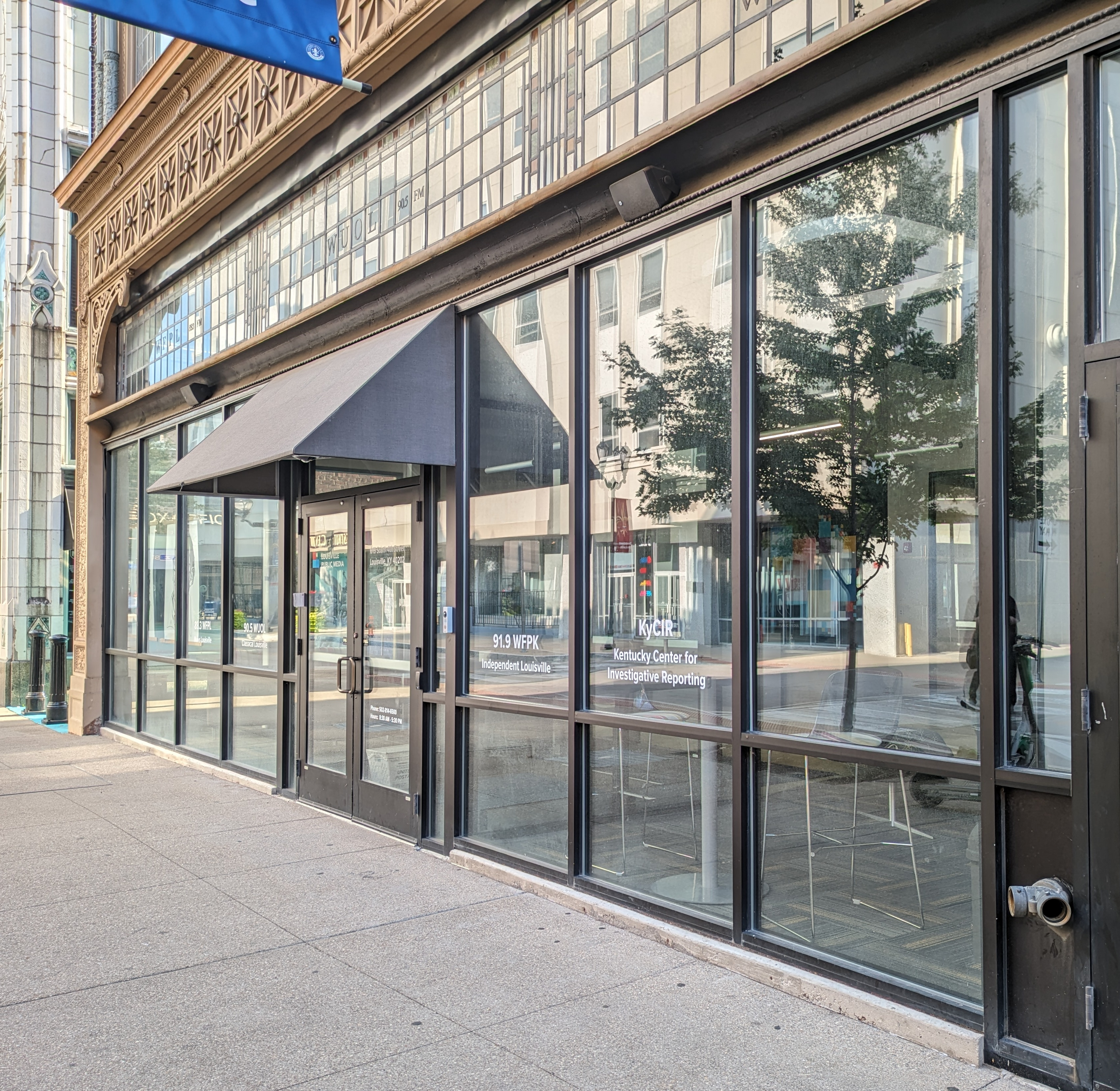
Office in Louisville

The Kentucky Center for Investigative Reporting (KyCIR) is a nonprofit digital newsroom. It is focused on watchdog journalism related to the U.S. state of Kentucky. Launched in 2013, the center is headquartered in Louisville, Kentucky. It is a service of Louisville Public Media, the NPR member organization in Louisville. Kate Howard has been the KyCIR's managing editor since 2018.

== History and structure ==
The publication is funded by its parent non-profit corporation, Louisville Public Media, which has a board of directors that includes members recruited from the University of Louisville, the Louisville Metro Government, and the community at-large. Its meetings are open to the public. Louisville Public Media's origins began with WFPL, a 10 watt FM radio station owned by the Louisville Free Public Library that began broadcasting in 1950. It now operates three full NPR stations–news/talk WFPL, classical WUOL-FM, and adult album alternative WFPK.

KyCIR incorporated in 2013. Its independence is claimed to be assured by a firewall between it and its funding individuals and organizations, and it publishes its list of donors annually. It is supported primarily by member donors, who contribute 59% of its revenues, as well as another 31% from local philanthropists and organizations, and it also receives grants and support from the Corporation for Public Broadcasting.

Louisville's Courier-Journal wrote that KyCIR was "augmenting those of traditional media" and that "When it comes to participating in a democracy, the more fact-based journalism, the better."

In 2017, KyCIR's staff included R. G. Dunlop, Kate Howard, Alexandra Kanik, and Eleanor Klibanoff.

== Coverage ==
It has published stories critical of the University of Louisville including regarding accounting problems and misspending by the university's foundation.

In recognition for reporting it did in 2015, the Center won two Green Eyeshades Award first-place awards, an award of the Society of Professional Journalists that acknowledges the work of journalists in the Southeast U.S. The stories chronicled a patronage system that rewards jailers who actually don't have existing jails, and widespread health problems in county jails. In another story which received regional recognition, the KyCIR reported on the banishment of a mentally ill man from Carrollton, Kentucky by the sheriff, in violation of court orders, sending him to Florida.

In December 2017, the KyCIR released "The Pope's Long Con", the results of an investigation of an evangelical minister and state representative, Dan Johnson, who had been accused of molestation of a 17-year-old family friend. The story, the product of over 100 interviews and reviews of over 1,000 documents, detailed Johnson's long history of arson, insurance fraud, illegal alcohol sales and preposterous claims that included raising of the dead and tales of claimed heroism at the Twin Towers. The next day, the pastor denied everything, blaming his problems on "NPR", which he said was out to get him. A day after that he killed himself, catapulting the Center into the national limelight. The Center's membership grew after the story's publication. The story won KyCIR a 2017 Peabody Award.
