= Gerry Lynn (politician) =

American politician (1952–2020)

Judge/Executive of Meade County
- In office January 3, 2011 – September 6, 2020
- Preceded by: Harry Craycroft
- Succeeded by: Leslie Stith

Member of the Kentucky House of Representatives from the 27th district
- In office January 1, 2005 – January 1, 2007
- Preceded by: Jim Thompson
- Succeeded by: Jeff Greer

Personal details
- Born: Gerald Allen Lynn; May 28, 1952
- Died: September 6, 2020 (aged 68) Brandenburg, Kentucky
- Party: Republican

Gerald Allen Lynn (May 28, 1952 – September 6, 2020) was an American politician who served as the Judge/Executive of Meade County, Kentucky from 2011 to 2020. He previously served in the Kentucky House of Representatives from the 27th district from 2005 to 2007.

Lynn served in the Kentucky National Guard. He was a general contractor and building inspector. Lynn was the owner of Lunn's Pins Bowling Center in Brandenburg, Kentucky.

Lynn was elected to the house in 2004, defeating Democratic incumbent Jim Thompson. He was defeated for reelection in 2006 by Democrat Jeff Greer.

He died on September 6, 2020, in Brandenburg, Kentucky, at age 68.
