= Chris Freeland =

American politician (born 1969)

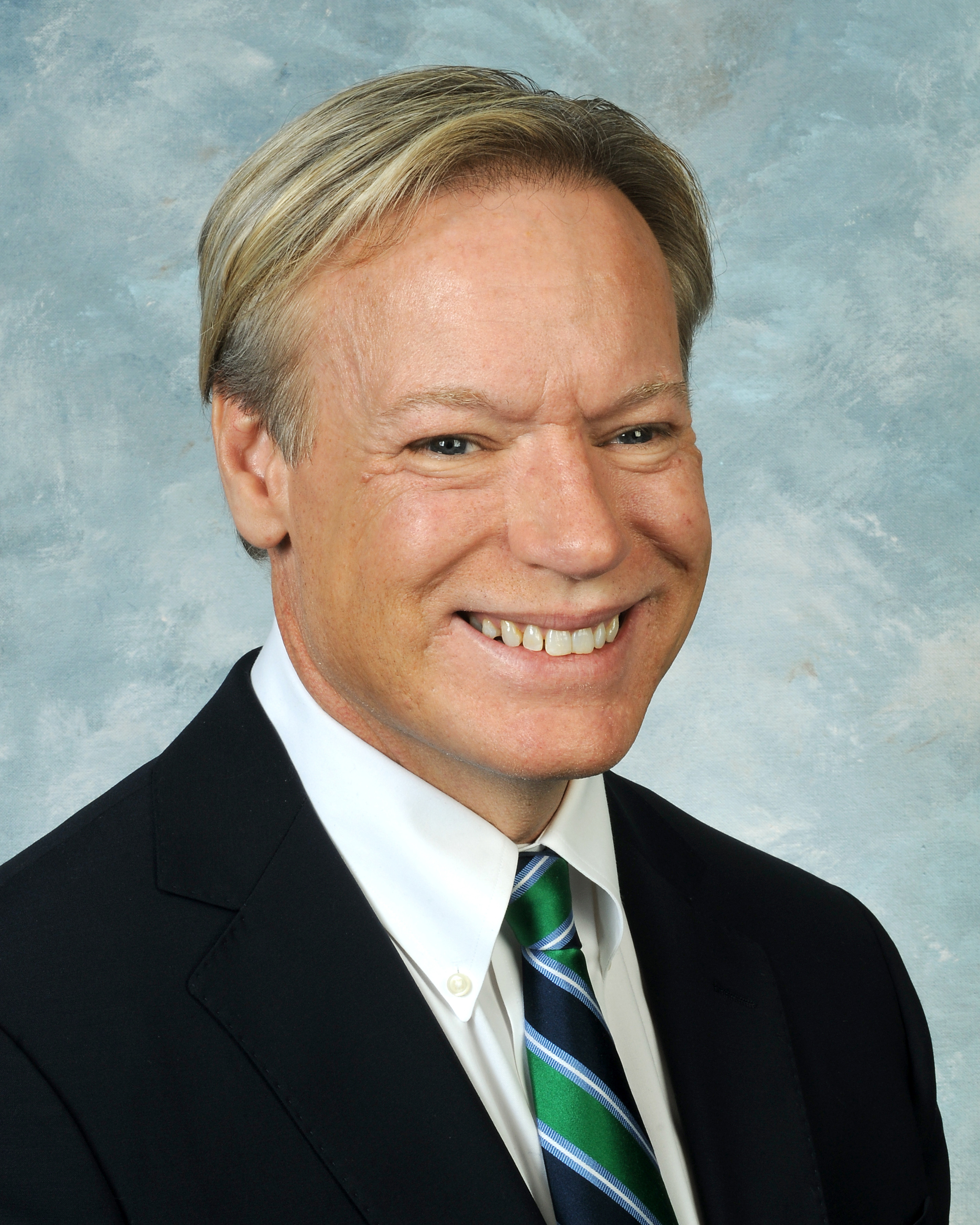
- Official portrait, 2018

Member of the Kentucky House of Representatives from the 6th district
- Incumbent
- Assumed office January 1, 2019
- Preceded by: Will Coursey

Personal details
- Born: January 7, 1969 (age 57) Benton, Kentucky
- Party: Republican
- Education: Murray State University (BA, MA)
- Committees: Budget Review Subcommittee on General Government (Chair); Agriculture; Appropriations and Revenue; Local Government; Veterans, Military Affairs, and Public Protection

Chris Barnes Freeland (born January 7, 1969) is an American politician serving as a Republican member of the Kentucky House of Representatives since January 2019. He represents Kentucky's 6th House district, which includes Lyon, Marshall, and McCracken counties.

== Early life and education ==
Freeland was born in Benton, Kentucky on January 7, 1969. He graduated from Marshall County High School and went on to attend Murray State University where he earned a Bachelor of Arts in advertising and history as well as a Master of Arts in communications.

== Career ==
=== Business ===
Freeland is the general manager of Freeland Broadcasting, a small family owned and operated media group that includes WCBL in Benton, WCCK in Calvert City, two stations in Tennessee and the online newspaper, MarshallCountyDaily.com. He also hosts an interview program, “Coffee Call,” which airs weekday mornings on WCBL.

Freeland is a member of Lions Club International, the Kentucky Broadcasters Association, the National Rifle Association of America, and the Marshall County Chamber of Commerce.

=== Elections ===
In 2018, Kentucky's 6th House district incumbent, Willy Coursey, did not seek reelection and instead chose to run for Judge Executive of Marshall County. Freeland won the 2018 Republican primary and went on to win the 2018 Kentucky House of Representatives election against Democratic candidate Linda Edwards. Freeland defeated Edwards by 29 points, and assumed office on January 1, 2019.

In 2020, Freeland was unopposed in the 2020 Republican primary and won the 2020 Kentucky House of Representatives election against Democratic candidate Al Cunningham. He ran for re-election in 2020 against Al Cunningham. Freeland defeated Cunningham by 43.8 points.

In 2022, he ran for re-election unopposed in both the 2022 Republican primary and 2022 Kentucky House of Representatives election, winning the latter with 14,928 votes.

In 2024, Freeland was unopposed in the 2024 Republican primary and won the 2024 Kentucky House of Representatives election with 16,558 votes (76.9%) against Democratic candidate Linda Edwards.

2024 Kentucky House of Representatives election - Kentucky's 6th House District
Party	Candidate	Votes	%
Republican	Chris Freeland	16,558	76.9%
Democratic	Linda Edwards	4,978	23.1%

2022 Kentucky House of Representatives election - Kentucky's 6th House District
Party	Candidate	Votes	%
Republican	Chris Freeland	14,928	100.0%

2020 Kentucky House of Representatives election - Kentucky's 6th House District
Party	Candidate	Votes	%
Republican	Chris Freeland	16,562	71.9%
Democratic	Al Cunningham	6,487	28.1%

2018 Kentucky House of Representatives election - Kentucky's 6th House District
Party	Candidate	Votes	%
Republican	Chris Freeland	12,236	64.5%
Democratic	Linda Edwards	6,727	35.5%

2018 Republican Primary election - Kentucky's 6th House District
Party	Candidate	Votes	%
Republican	Chris Freeland	1,490	63.3%
Republican	Randall Fox	863	36.7%
