= Richard Lewis (Kentucky politician) =

American politician

Member of the Kentucky House of Representatives from the 6th district
- In office January 1, 1989 – January 1, 1995
- Preceded by: J. R. Gray
- Succeeded by: J. R. Gray
- In office January 1, 1970 – May 31, 1975
- Preceded by: Shelby McCallum
- Succeeded by: J. R. Gray

Personal details
- Born: December 3, 1937
- Died: March 10, 1997 (aged 59)
- Party: Democratic

Richard Hayes Lewis (December 3, 1937 – March 11, 1997) was an American politician from Kentucky who was a member of the Kentucky House of Representatives from 1970 to 1975 and 1989 to 1995. Lewis was first elected in 1969 after incumbent representative and former speaker of the house Shelby McCallum retired. He resigned from the house in May 1975 in order to join the executive staff of governor Julian Carroll. Lewis returned to the house in 1988, defeating incumbent representative J. R. Gray for renomination. He retired from the house in 1994.

Following his time in the house, Lewis was appointed by governor Brereton C. Jones to the board of regents of Murray State University. Lewis died in March 1997.
