= Mark S. Brown =

American politician

Mark Brown

Secretary of the Kentucky Labor Cabinet
- In office December 1, 2010 – May 15, 2013
- Governor: Steve Beshear
- Preceded by: J. R. Gray
- Succeeded by: Larry Roberts

Judge/Executive of Meade County
- In office January 4, 1999 – January 6, 2003

Member of the Kentucky House of Representatives from the 27th district
- In office January 1, 1985 – January 1, 1999
- Preceded by: Bill Lile (redistricting)
- Succeeded by: Jim Thompson

Personal details
- Born: February 22, 1951 (age 75)
- Party: Democratic

Mark Stephen Brown (born February 22, 1951) is an American politician from Kentucky who was a member of the Kentucky House of Representatives from 1985 to 1999. Brown was first elected to the house in 1984. He retired from the house in 1998 in order to run for Judge/Executive of Meade County. In 2010 Brown was appointed Secretary of the Kentucky Labor Cabinet by governor Steve Beshear. He resigned from the position in May 2013.
