= Thomas Huff =

American politician (born 1963)

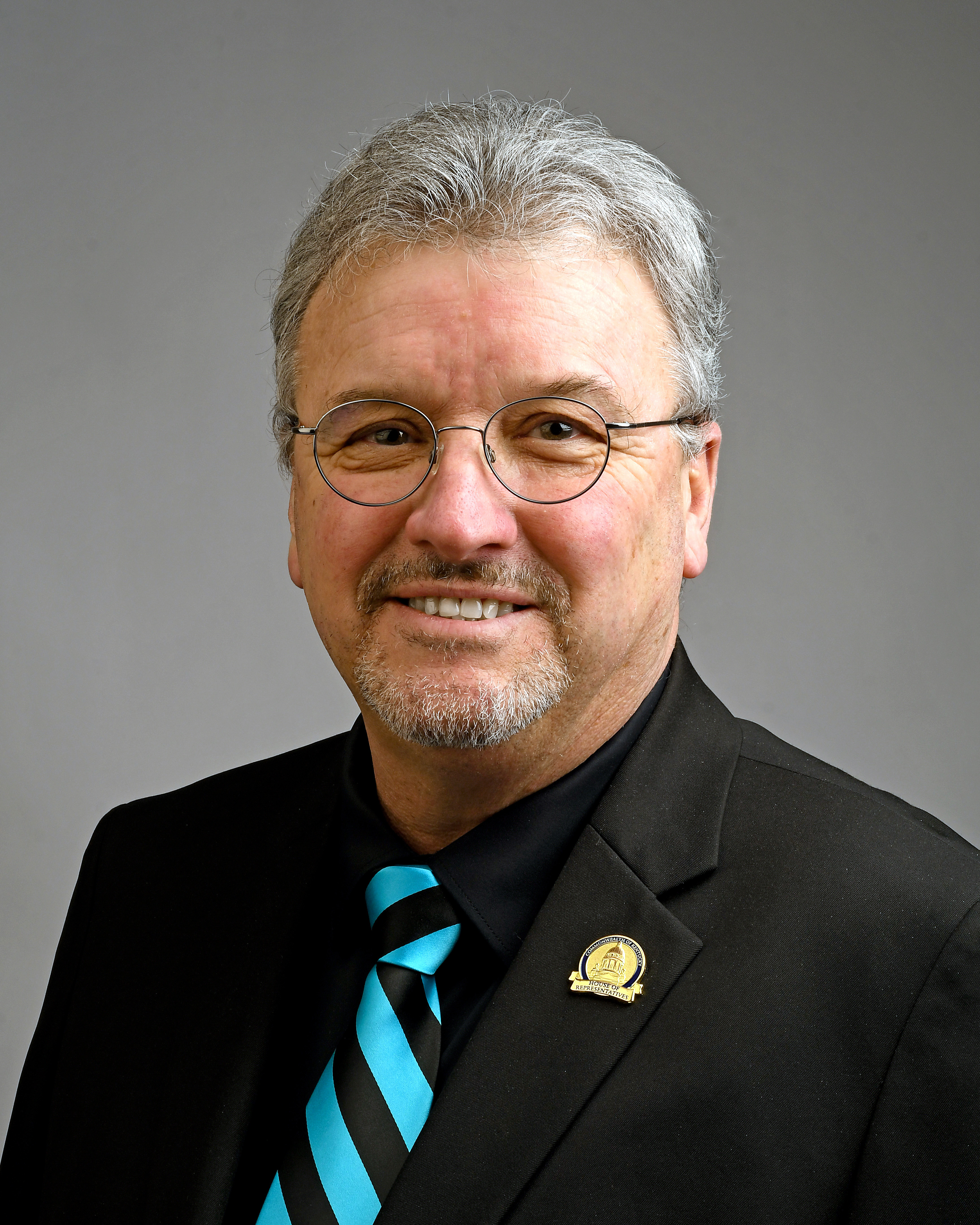

Member of the Kentucky House of Representatives from the 49th district
- Incumbent
- Assumed office January 1, 2019
- Preceded by: Linda Belcher

Personal details
- Born: June 10, 1963 (age 63) Shepherdsville, Kentucky
- Party: Republican
- Committees: Enrollment (Chair); Economic Development & Workforce Investment (Vice Chair); Licensing, Occupations, & Administrative Regulations; State Government; Transportation

Thomas Ray Huff (born June 10, 1963) is an American politician and Republican member of the Kentucky House of Representatives from Kentucky's 49th House district. His district comprises part of Bullitt County. He assumed office in January 2019.

== Background ==
Huff was born and raised in Shepherdsville, Kentucky, and graduated from Bullitt County High School. Following graduation Huff started Huff's Used Cars and Auto Parts, a small business he continues to operate today.

He is also a member of his local Shriner club, Scottish Rite lodge, and Lions Club.

== Political career ==
=== Elections ===
- 2018 Huff was unopposed in the 2018 Republican primary and won the 2018 Kentucky House of Representatives election with 8,680 votes (59.4%) against incumbent Democratic representative Linda Belcher.
- 2020 Huff was unopposed in the 2020 Republican primary and won the 2020 Kentucky House of Representatives election with 15,828 votes (72.6%) against Democratic candidate Jonathan Cacciatore and Libertarian candidate Mitch Rushing.
- 2022 Huff was unopposed in both the 2022 Republican primary and the 2022 Kentucky House of Representatives election, winning with 10,594 votes.
- 2024 Huff won the 2024 Republican primary with 1,955 votes (75.1%) against challenger William Harned and was unopposed in the 2024 Kentucky House of Representatives election, winning with 19,471 votes.
