= Jill York =

American politician

Member of the Kentucky House of Representatives from the 96th district
- In office January 5, 2010 – January 1, 2019
- Preceded by: Robin L. Webb
- Succeeded by: Kathy Hinkle

Personal details
- Born: October 21, 1966 (age 59)
- Party: Republican
- Education: Marshall University; Transylvania University
- Website: jillyork.com

Jill K. York (born October 21, 1966) is an American politician and a former Republican member of the Kentucky House of Representatives. York represented district 96 from 2010 to 2019. First elected in a December 2009 special election to fill the vacancy caused by the election of incumbent representative Robin L. Webb to the Kentucky Senate, she served until her defeat by Democrat Kathy Hinkle in 2018.

== Education ==
York attended Marshall University, Marshall University's W. Page Pitt School of Journalism and Mass Communications, and Transylvania University.

== Elections ==
- 2018: York was defeated by Democrat Kathy Hinkle.
- 2012 York was unopposed for both the May 22, 2012 Republican Primary and the November 6, 2012 General election, winning with 10,024 votes.
- 2009 When District 96 Democratic Representative Webb ran for the remainder of an unexpired Kentucky Senate term, York won the 2009 Special election with 2,545 votes (60.5%) against Democratic nominee Barry Webb.
- 2010 York won the May 18, 2010 Republican Primary with 3,488 votes (66.5%) and won the November 2, 2010 General election with 6,954 votes (58.2%) against Democratic nominee David Hayes.
