= Archie Romines =

American politician

Member of the Kentucky House of Representatives from the 27th district
- In office January 1, 1974 – January 1, 1982
- Preceded by: Bill Lile
- Succeeded by: Bill Lile

Personal details
- Born: April 28, 1929 Edmonton, Kentucky
- Died: September 20, 2020 (aged 91) Louisville, Kentucky
- Party: Democratic

Military service
- Allegiance: United States
- Branch/service: U.S. Army
- Rank: Private
- Battles/wars: World War II

Archie Neal Romines Sr. (April 28, 1929 – September 20, 2020) was an American politician who served as a Democratic member of the Kentucky House of Representatives. He represented Kentucky's 27th House district from 1974 to 1982.
