= R. G. Dunlop =

R. G. Dunlop is an American journalist for the Kentucky Center for Investigative Reporting, based in Louisville, Kentucky.

Dunlop graduated from Miami University and Northwestern University. He joined the Courier-Journal of Louisville in 1977.

Dunlop won a George Polk Award in 2002 for Local Reporting with Jason Riley for their four-part series "Justice Delayed, Justice Denied," on thousands of unresolved criminal cases in Kentucky. Dunlop also won a George Polk Award in 1998 for Environmental Reporting, with Gardiner Harris.

Dunlop has worked on the Courier-Journal special investigative series "Prescription for Tragedy," on the prescription painkiller crisis. Dunlop and fellow reporter Scott Utterback were once "detained and confronted while trying to report about a Paintsville, Kentucky pain clinic under fire for its narcotics prescription practices."

Dunlop, with fellow Courier-Journal reporters Robert T. Garrett, Mike Brown, and Bill Osinski and photographer Stewart Bowman were finalists for the 1983 Pulitzer Prize in Local Investigative Specialized Reporting "for their series on illegal and dangerous operations in the coal industry."
