= J. R. Gray =

American politician

Secretary of the Kentucky Labor Cabinet
- In office January 2008 – November 30, 2010
- Governor: Steve Beshear
- Preceded by: Office created
- Succeeded by: Mark S. Brown

Member of the Kentucky House of Representatives from the 6th district
- In office January 1, 1995 – December 2007
- Preceded by: Richard Lewis
- Succeeded by: Will Coursey
- In office January 1, 1976 – January 1, 1989
- Preceded by: Richard Lewis
- Succeeded by: Richard Lewis

Personal details
- Born: James Rhyman Gray Jr. July 17, 1938 near Eddyville, Kentucky
- Died: May 11, 2022 (aged 83) Benton, Kentucky
- Party: Democratic
- Spouse: Yvonne
- Children: 2

James Rhyman Gray Jr. (July 17, 1938 – May 11, 2022) was an American politician in the state of Kentucky. He served in the Kentucky House of Representatives as a Democrat from 1976 to 1989 and from 1995 to 2007. He was appointed Secretary of the Kentucky Labor Cabinet in 2008, by governor Steve Beshear and served until his retirement in November 2010.

Gray was first elected to the house in 1975 after incumbent Richard Lewis resigned from the house in order to join the executive staff of governor Julian Carroll. In 1988 Lewis ran for the house again and defeated Gray in the May primary election. Gray won election to the house again in 1994 after Lewis did not run for reelection.

Gray completed his journeyman apprenticeship at Youngtown Sheet & Tube in Gary, Indiana. He was employed at the Calvert City B. F. Goodrich. After a few years working at B. F. Goodrich, where he served as a steward & as the Directing Business Agent of the Machinist & Aerospace Workers “IAM,” District Lodge 154 Calvert City for twenty years.

Gray and his wife Yvonne lived in Benton from 1963 until the time of his death. They had two children, Randy and Teresa.
