= Bill Lile =

American politician

Member of the Kentucky House of Representatives
- In office January 1, 1982 – November 15, 1997
- Preceded by: Archie Romines
- Succeeded by: Charles Miller
- Constituency: 27th district (1982–1985); 28th district (1985–1997)
- In office January 1, 1972 – January 1, 1974
- Preceded by: Wallace Bartley (redistricting)
- Succeeded by: Archie Romines
- Constituency: 27th district

Personal details
- Born: January 6, 1946 (age 80)
- Party: Republican

William J. Lile (born January 6, 1946) is an American politician from Kentucky who was a member of the Kentucky House of Representatives from 1972 to 1974 and from 1982 to 1997. Lile was first elected to the house in 1971. He was defeated for reelection in 1973 by Democrat Archie Romines. Lile challenged Romines again in 1981, defeating him for reelection. He resigned from the house in November 1997 in order to join the Jefferson County Board of Elections.

Kentucky House of Representatives
Preceded by Wallace Bartley	Member of the Kentucky House of Representatives from the 27th district 1972–1974	Succeeded by Archie Romines
Preceded by Archie Romines	Member of the Kentucky House of Representatives from the 27th district 1982–1985	Succeeded by Mark S. Brown
Preceded by Jim Dunn	Member of the Kentucky House of Representatives from the 28th district 1985–1997	Succeeded by Charles Miller
