= Jim Thompson (Kentucky politician) =

American politician

Member of the Kentucky House of Representatives from the 27th district
- In office January 1, 1999 – January 1, 2005
- Preceded by: Mark S. Brown
- Succeeded by: Gerry Lynn

Personal details
- Born: January 11, 1948 (age 78)
- Party: Democratic

James Hamilton Thompson (born January 11, 1948) is an American politician from Kentucky who was a member of the Kentucky House of Representatives from 1999 to 2005. Thompson was first elected in 1998 after incumbent representative Mark S. Brown retired. He was defeated for reelection in 2004 by Republican Gerry Lynn.
