= Kentucky's 6th House of Representatives district =

American legislative district

Kentucky's 6th State House of Representatives district
Representative
Chris Freeland; R–Benton
since January 1, 2019
- Registration: 49.8% Republican; 41.6% Democratic; 8.1% No party preference
- Demographics: 93.7% White; 1.9% Black; 1.6% Hispanic; 0.5% Asian; 0.3% Native American; 0.1% Other; 2.1% Multiracial
- Population (2023): 44,011
- Registered voters (2025): 36,172

Kentucky's 6th House of Representatives district is one of 100 districts in the Kentucky House of Representatives. Located in the far west of the state, it comprises the counties of Lyon, Marshall, and part of McCracken. It has been represented by Chris Freeland (R–Benton) since 2019. As of 2023, the district had a population of 44,011.

== Voter registration ==
On January 1, 2025, the district had 36,172 registered voters, who were registered with the following parties.

Party	Registration	
Party	Voters	%
Republican	18,014	49.80
Democratic	15,060	41.63
Independent	1,356	3.75
Libertarian	147	0.41
Green	21	0.06
Constitution	9	0.02
Socialist Workers	5	0.01
Reform	2	0.01
"Other"	1,558	4.31
Total	36,172	100.00
Source: Kentucky State Board of Elections

== List of members representing the district ==
Member	Party	Years	Electoral history	District location
Richard Lewis (Benton)	Democratic	January 1, 1970 – May 31, 1975	Elected in 1969. Reelected in 1971. Reelected in 1973. Resigned to join the administration of Julian Carroll.	1964–1972; Caldwell, Lyon, and Marshall Counties.
Richard Lewis (Benton)	Democratic	January 1, 1970 – May 31, 1975	Elected in 1969. Reelected in 1971. Reelected in 1973. Resigned to join the administration of Julian Carroll.	1972–1974; Lyon, Marshall, and Crittenden (part) Counties.
Richard Lewis (Benton)	Democratic	January 1, 1970 – May 31, 1975	Elected in 1969. Reelected in 1971. Reelected in 1973. Resigned to join the administration of Julian Carroll.	1974–1985; Lyon, Marshall, and Crittenden (part) Counties.
J. R. Gray (Benton)	Democratic	January 1, 1976 – January 1, 1989	Elected in 1975. Reelected in 1977. Reelected in 1979. Reelected in 1981. Reelected in 1984. Reelected in 1986. Lost renomination.	1974–1985; Lyon, Marshall, and Crittenden (part) Counties.
J. R. Gray (Benton)	Democratic	January 1, 1976 – January 1, 1989	Elected in 1975. Reelected in 1977. Reelected in 1979. Reelected in 1981. Reelected in 1984. Reelected in 1986. Lost renomination.	1985–1993; Lyon, Marshall, and Caldwell (part) Counties.
Richard Lewis (Benton)	Democratic	January 1, 1989 – January 1, 1995	Elected in 1988. Reelected in 1990. Reelected in 1992. Retired.	1985–1993; Lyon, Marshall, and Caldwell (part) Counties.
Richard Lewis (Benton)	Democratic	January 1, 1989 – January 1, 1995	Elected in 1988. Reelected in 1990. Reelected in 1992. Retired.	1993–1997; Lyon, Marshall, and Caldwell (part) Counties.
J. R. Gray (Benton)	Democratic	January 1, 1995 – December 2007	Elected in 1994. Reelected in 1996. Reelected in 1998. Reelected in 2000. Reelected in 2002. Reelected in 2004. Reelected in 2006. Resigned to become Secretary of the Kentucky Labor Cabinet.	1993–1997; Lyon, Marshall, and Caldwell (part) Counties.
J. R. Gray (Benton)	Democratic	January 1, 1995 – December 2007	Elected in 1994. Reelected in 1996. Reelected in 1998. Reelected in 2000. Reelected in 2002. Reelected in 2004. Reelected in 2006. Resigned to become Secretary of the Kentucky Labor Cabinet.	1997–2003
J. R. Gray (Benton)	Democratic	January 1, 1995 – December 2007	Elected in 1994. Reelected in 1996. Reelected in 1998. Reelected in 2000. Reelected in 2002. Reelected in 2004. Reelected in 2006. Resigned to become Secretary of the Kentucky Labor Cabinet.	2003–2015
Will Coursey (Symsonia)	Democratic	February 11, 2008 – January 1, 2019	Elected to finish Gray's term. Reelected in 2008. Reelected in 2010. Reelected in 2012. Reelected in 2014. Reelected in 2016. Retired to run for Judge/Executive of Marshall County.	2003–2015
Will Coursey (Symsonia)	Democratic	February 11, 2008 – January 1, 2019	Elected to finish Gray's term. Reelected in 2008. Reelected in 2010. Reelected in 2012. Reelected in 2014. Reelected in 2016. Retired to run for Judge/Executive of Marshall County.	2015–2023
Chris Freeland (Benton)	Republican	January 1, 2019 – present	Elected in 2018. Reelected in 2020. Reelected in 2022. Reelected in 2024. Reelected in 2026.	2015–2023
Chris Freeland (Benton)	Republican	January 1, 2019 – present	Elected in 2018. Reelected in 2020. Reelected in 2022. Reelected in 2024. Reelected in 2026.	2023–present
