= Scott Sharp (politician) =

American politician

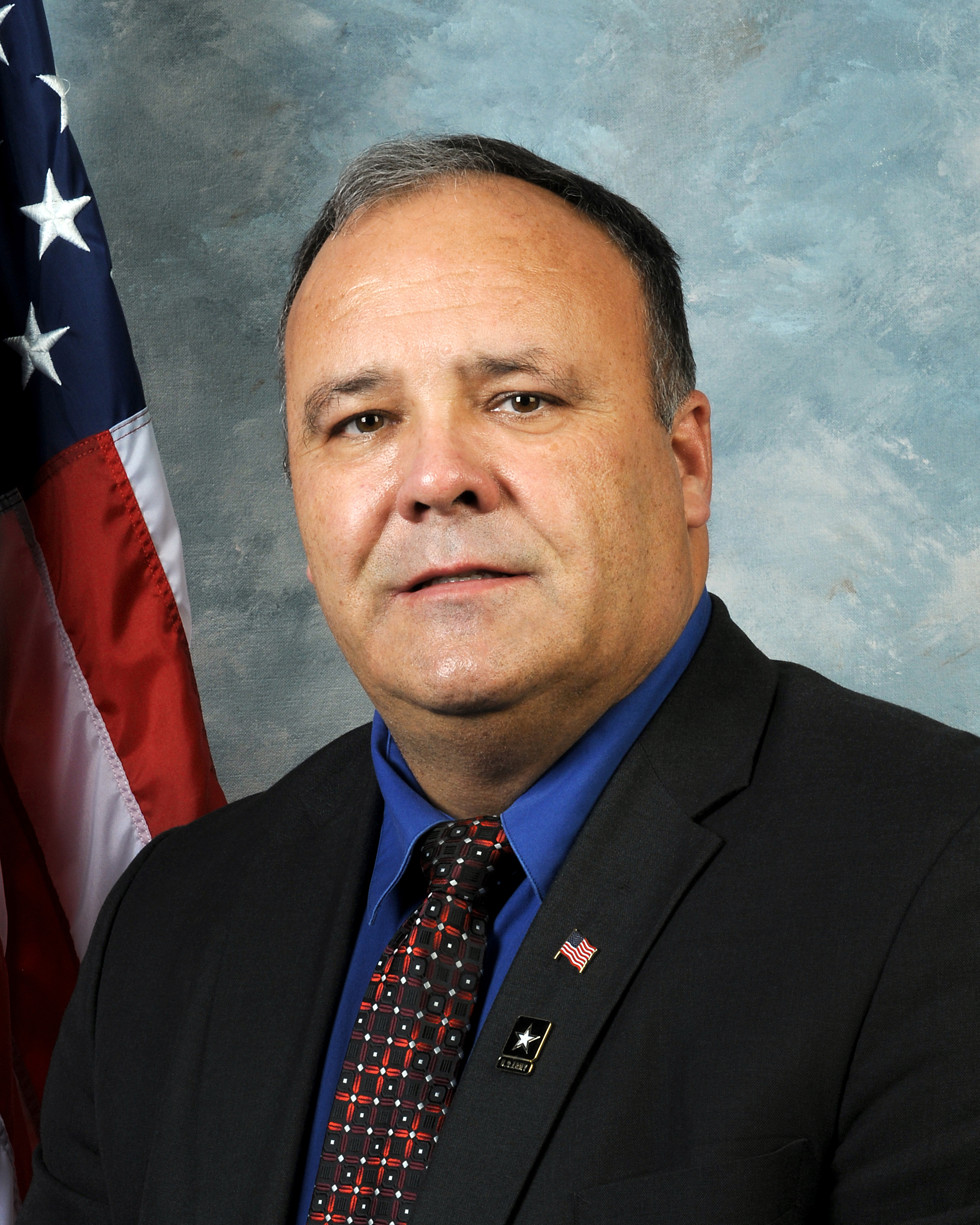

Member of the Kentucky House of Representatives from the 100th district
- Incumbent
- Assumed office January 1, 2021
- Preceded by: Terri Branham Clark

Personal details
- Born: September 25, 1963 (age 62)
- Party: Republican
- Children: 4
- Education: Wayland Baptist University (BA); Webster University (MS); St. Joseph University(MA)
- Committees: Legislative Oversight & Investigations (co-chair); Economic Development & Workforce Investment; Health Services; Veterans, Military Affairs, & Public Protection

Military service
- Allegiance: United States
- Branch/service: United States Army
- Unit: Criminal Investigation Command (USACIDC)

Scott Lindsay Sharp (born September 25, 1963) is an American politician who has served as a Republican member of the Kentucky House of Representatives since January 2021. He represents Kentucky's 100th House district, which includes Lawrence County and part of Boyd County.

== Background ==
Sharp is a native of Ashland, Kentucky. Following his high school graduation in 1982, Sharp enlisted in the United States Army. He would serve for 22 years, beginning as a military policeman but spending most of his time as a special agent with the U.S. Army Criminal Investigation Command. He also served as special agent in charge of the CID's counter drug task force and a protective services officer for General H. Norman Schwarzkopf. Sharp retired from the army in 2004, and returned to Ashland.

Sharp earned a Bachelor of Arts in criminal justice from Wayland Baptist University as well as a Master of Science in organizational psychology from St. Joseph University, and a Master of Arts in management from Webster University. He has taught law enforcement technology at Ohio University's Southern Campus and was a training course manager for the Department of Justice's Operation Alliance.

Sharp is an active member of the American Legion, CID Agents Association, and Sons of the American Revolution. He identifies as a Catholic.

== Electoral history ==
=== Elections ===
- 2014 Democratic incumbent Terry Keelin chose not to seek reelection as Boyd County Sheriff. Sharp won the 2014 Republican primary for Boyd County Sheriff with 1,506 votes (69%) but was defeated in the 2014 County Officers election, garnering 5,100 votes (35.3%) against Democratic candidate Bobby Jack Woods.
- 2018 Sharp was unopposed in the 2018 Republican primary for Kentucky's 18th Senate district but was defeated in the 2018 Kentucky Senate election, garnering 15,823 votes (42.2%) against Democratic incumbent Robin Webb.
- 2020 Sharp was unopposed in the 2020 Republican primary for Kentucky's 100th House district and won the 2020 Kentucky House of Representatives election with 10,558 votes (54.4%) against Democratic incumbent Terri Branham Clark.
- 2022 Sharp was unopposed in both the 2022 Republican primary and the 2022 Kentucky House of Representatives election, winning the latter with 9,845 votes.
- 2024 Sharp was unopposed in both the 2024 Republican primary and the 2024 Kentucky House of Representatives election, winning the latter with 15,034.

Kentucky House of Representatives
Preceded by Terri Branham Clark	Member of the Kentucky House of Representatives; 2023–present	Succeeded by incumbent
