= Terri Branham Clark =

American politician

Member of the Kentucky House of Representatives from the 100th district
- In office January 1, 2019 – January 1, 2021
- Preceded by: Kevin Sinnette
- Succeeded by: Scott Sharp

Personal details
- Party: Democratic

Terri Branham Clark (born December 22, 1966) is an American politician from Kentucky who was a member of the Kentucky House of Representatives from 2019 to 2021. Branham Clark was first elected in 2018 after incumbent representative Kevin Sinnette retired to run for the Kentucky Court of Appeals. She was defeated for reelection in 2020 by Republican Scott Sharp.
