= Allen Maricle =

American politician

Member of the Kentucky House of Representatives from the 49th district
- In office January 13, 1994 – January 1, 1999
- Preceded by: John Harper
- Succeeded by: Larry Belcher

Personal details
- Born: December 5, 1962 (age 63)
- Party: Republican
- Education: Sullivan Junior College

Delmer Allen Maricle (born December 5, 1962) is an American politician and actor.

Maricle lived in Pioneer Village, Kentucky. He went to Sullivan Junior College and worked a communication specialist. He also worked in the television industry. He served two terms as a city councilman in Pioneer Village. First elected in a special election, he served three terms as a Republican in the Kentucky House of Representatives from January 1994 to January 1999. He was defeated for reelection in 1998 by Democrat Larry Belcher. In 2023 he unsuccessfully challenged incumbent Secretary of State Michael Adams in the 2023 election.

== Filmography ==
- Speak and May The Plague Take You (2010)
- The Dinner Party (2009)
