= Larry Belcher =

American politician

Member of the Kentucky House of Representatives from the 49th district
- In office January 1, 2007 – October 6, 2008
- Preceded by: Mary C. Harper
- Succeeded by: Linda H. Belcher
- In office January 1, 1999 – January 1, 2003
- Preceded by: Allen Maricle
- Succeeded by: Mary C. Harper

Personal details
- Born: Larry Lee Belcher; April 4, 1947 Campbellsville, Kentucky, U.S.
- Died: October 6, 2008 (aged 61) Edmonson County, Kentucky, U.S.
- Party: Democratic
- Spouse: Linda Belcher
- Relations: Cecil Belcher (father); Margaret Belcher (mother); Ron Belcher (brother); Dennis Belcher (brother)
- Children: Jennifer Belcher; Jeremy Belcher
- Education: Eastern Kentucky University (BS); University of Louisville (MS)
- Occupation: Educator

Larry Lee Belcher (April 4, 1947 – October 6, 2008) was an American educator, county zoning administrator, and Democratic member of the Kentucky House of Representatives. He represented Kentucky's 49th House district, which includes parts of Bullitt County. Belcher was killed in a car accident in 2008. His wife Linda, a former elementary school principal, replaced Belcher on the 2008 ballot. She was subsequently elected to the Kentucky House of Representatives in 2008 and was reelected in 2010. She lost in 2012, won again in 2014, lost in 2016, and won a special election to return to the legislature in February 2018.

== Early life ==
Belcher was born in Campbellsville, Kentucky on April 4, 1947. His parents were Cecil Lee Belcher and Margaret Lucille Girtley. In the 1960s, Belcher was receiving his bachelor's degree from Eastern Kentucky University and his master's degree from University of Louisville. In 1970, he was beginning his career as a teacher in Bullitt County. He was also a coach in softball and gymnastics.

== Career ==
Belcher spent most of his career as a teacher and coach before becoming an administrator. He served as principal of Bernhiem Middle School in Bullitt County. He also became principal of Roby and Nichols Elementary School in the Bullitt County School District. Subsequently, Belcher served in the Kentucky House of Representatives from 1999 to 2001. In 2002, he unsuccessfully ran against Gary Tapp for the 20th Senate district. In 2005, he was appointed administrator of the Bullitt County Planning and Zoning Commission. He returned to the House in 2006 and ran for reelection in 2008.

During his run for political office in 1998, Belcher was serving as the director of buildings and ground maintenance for the Bullitt County School District. That same year, Belcher defeated Joe Walls 4,332 to 2,039 in the Democratic primary for Kentucky House district 49. Shortly after he was taking office in February 1999, the Kentucky Transportation Cabinet allotted $700,000 for the repair of roads in Bullitt County. According to the Courier-Journal, Belcher secured an additional $200,000 at the last minute for the maintenance and resurfacing of 13.6 miles of road.

== Election results ==
=== Kentucky House of Representatives ===
Date	Election	Candidate	Party	Votes	%
Kentucky House of Representatives, 49th district
November 3, 1998	General	Larry Belcher	Democratic	5,983	55.01
November 3, 1998	General	Allen Maricle	Republican	4,893	44.99
November 7, 2000	General	Russell Webber	Republican	8,839	54.12
November 7, 2000	General	Larry Belcher	Democratic	7,492	45.88
November 2, 2004	General	Mary Harper	Republican	8,222	44.07
November 2, 2004	General	Larry Belcher	Democratic	10,434	55.93
November 7, 2006	General	Larry Belcher	Democratic	4,903	53.33
November 7, 2006	General	Mary Harper	Republican	4,291	46.67

=== Kentucky Senate ===
Date	Election	Candidate	Party	Votes	%
Kentucky Senate, 20th district
November 5, 2002	General	Gary Tapp	Republican Party	17,204	56.46
November 5, 2002	General	Larry Belcher	Democratic Party	13,266	43.54

== Death ==
On October 6, 2008, Belcher was killed in a traffic accident in Edmonson County, Kentucky when his pickup truck ran into the back of a stopped tractor-trailer truck on Interstate 65. The medical cause of the accident was never determined.

== Legacy ==
On January 10, 2018, Kentucky House Resolution 59 was introduced by Representatives Steve Riggs and Joni Jenkins urging the owners of KentuckyOne Health to rename the Medical Center South Jewish Hospital in Shepherdsville in honor of Belcher and his wife Linda, for their contributions to Bullitt County. Subsequently, the University of Louisville Health-Medical Center South elected to rename its boardroom the Larry Belcher Meeting Room. As of 2020, the Larry Belcher Meeting Room is the location of the Fox Chase City Council town hall meetings.
