= Kathy Hinkle =

American politician

Member of the Kentucky House of Representatives from the 96th district
- In office January 1, 2019 – January 1, 2021
- Preceded by: Jill York
- Succeeded by: Patrick Flannery

Personal details
- Party: Democratic

Kathy L. Hinkle (born September 12, 1956) is an American politician from Kentucky. She is a Democrat and represented District 96 in the State House from 2019 to 2021.

She lost her seat to Patrick Flannery in the 2020 Kentucky House of Representatives election.
