= Linda H. Belcher =

American educator and politician

Linda Belcher

Member of the Kentucky House of Representatives from the 49th district
- In office February 27, 2018 – January 1, 2019
- Preceded by: Dan Johnson
- Succeeded by: Thomas Huff
- In office January 1, 2015 – January 1, 2017
- Preceded by: Russell Webber (redistricting)
- Succeeded by: Dan Johnson
- In office January 1, 2009 – January 1, 2013
- Preceded by: Larry Belcher
- Succeeded by: Russell Webber

Personal details
- Born: Linda Howlett Belcher; September 28, 1948 (age 77) Shepherdsville, Kentucky, U.S.
- Party: Democratic
- Spouse: Larry Belcher
- Education: Eastern Kentucky University (BA); Western Kentucky University (MA)

Linda Howlett Belcher (born September 28, 1948) is an American educator and politician. She is a three-time member of the Kentucky House of Representatives, representing the 49th district, which covers parts of Bullitt County.

== Early life and education ==
Belcher was born in Shepherdsville, Kentucky. She received a Bachelor of Arts degree in elementary education from Eastern Kentucky University and a Master of Arts in elementary education from Western Kentucky University.

== Career ==
Outside of politics, Belcher worked as an elementary teacher and was a member of the Little Flock Christian Academy School Board. Belcher served in the Kentucky House of Representatives from 2009 to 2013 and from 2015 to 2017 as a Democrat. She succeeded her husband Larry Belcher in the Kentucky General Assembly after he was killed in an auto accident.

In 2016, Belcher was defeated for re-election by Republican Dan Johnson. Johnson committed suicide in December 2017, two days after elements of his criminal past had been exposed. Belcher ran again for the open seat in a district which president Donald Trump had won with 72% of the vote. Dan's widow, Rebecca, was chosen by Republican officials as their replacement nominee, to oppose Belcher in a special election. Belcher recaptured her old seat with 68% of the vote. She lost to Republican Thomas Huff in the general election of November 2018.

== Election results ==
Date	Election	Candidate	Party	Votes	%
Kentucky House of Representatives, 49th district
Nov 4, 2008	General	Linda Belcher	Democratic	10,954	53.96
Nov 4, 2008	General	Trina Summers	Republican	9,347	46.04
Nov 4, 2008	General	Larry Belcher died in office; seat stayed Democratic			
Nov 2, 2010	General	Linda Belcher	Democratic	7,878	50.32
Nov 2, 2010	General	Russell Webber	Republican	7,777	49.68
Nov 6, 2012	General	Russell Webber	Republican	11,329	52.81
Nov 6, 2012	General	Linda Belcher	Democratic	10,124	47.19
Nov 4, 2014	General	Linda Belcher	Democratic	6,675	52.92
Nov 4, 2014	General	Michael Nemes	Republican	5,938	47.08
Nov 8, 2016	General	Dan Johnson	Republican	9,342	50.42
Nov 8, 2016	General	Linda Belcher	Democratic	9,186	49.58
Feb 20, 2018	Special	Linda Belcher	Democratic	3,386	68.45
Feb 20, 2018	Special	Rebecca Johnson	Republican	1,561	31.55
Nov 6, 2018	General	Thomas Huff	Republican	8,680	59.41
Nov 6, 2018	General	Linda Belcher	Democratic	5,930	40.59
