= Kevin Sinnette =

American politician

Member of the Kentucky House of Representatives from the 100th district
- In office January 1, 2009 – January 1, 2019
- Preceded by: John Vincent
- Succeeded by: Terri Branham Clark

Personal details
- Born: March 2, 1962 (age 64) Ashland, Kentucky
- Party: Democratic
- Education: Eastern Kentucky University; Salmon P. Chase College of Law
- Profession: Attorney
- Website: kevinsinnette.com

Kevin P. Sinnette (born March 2, 1962) is an American politician and former Democratic member of the Kentucky House of Representatives who represented district 100 from 2009 to 2019. In 2018 he unsuccessfully ran for the Kentucky Court of Appeals, failing to advance from the top-two primary.

== Education ==
Sinnette earned his BS from Eastern Kentucky University and his JD from Northern Kentucky University's Salmon P. Chase College of Law.

== Legislative Elections ==
- 2012 Sinnette was unopposed for both the May 22, 2012 Democratic Primary and the November 6, 2012 General election, winning with 11,097 votes.
- 2008 When District 100 Republican Representative John Vincent left the Legislature and left the seat open, Sinnette won the 2008 Democratic Primary with 3,006 votes (52.2%) and won the November 4, 2008 General election with 10,113 votes (64.4%) against Republican nominee Michael Stewart.
- 2010 Sinnette was unopposed for the May 18, 2010 Democratic Primary and the November 2, 2010 General election, winning with 6,557 votes (59.7%) against Republican nominee Cheryl Spriggs.

== Judiciary ==
On November 29, 2017, the Kentucky Judicial Nominating Commission, led by Chief Justice John D. Minton, Jr., announced nominees to fill a vacancy in Boyd County Circuit Court. Boyd County is in the 32nd Judicial Circuit and the vacancy was in the circuit's 2nd Division. Sinnette was one of three nominees for the Circuit Court judgeship.
