= Donald B. Farley =

American politician

Don Farley

Member of the Kentucky House of Representatives from the 100th district
- In office January 1, 1991 – March 23, 1996
- Preceded by: Clarence Jackson
- Succeeded by: John Vincent

Personal details
- Born: October 25, 1935
- Died: March 23, 1996 (aged 60)
- Party: Republican

Donald B. Farley (October 25, 1935 – March 23, 1996) was an American politician. He served as a Republican member for the 100th district of the Kentucky House of Representatives.

== Life and career ==
Farley was a real estate agent.

Farley was first elected to the Kentucky House of Representatives in 1990, defeating Democratic incumbent Clarence Jackson. He won reelection in 1992 and 1994.

Farley died of an apparent heart attack on March 23, 1996, at the age of 60.
