= Will Coursey =

American politician (born 1978)

Member of the Marshall County Board of Education from the 4th district
- Incumbent
- Assumed office March 2023
- Preceded by: Ledonia Williamson

Member of the Kentucky House of Representatives from the 6th district
- In office February 11, 2008 – January 1, 2019
- Preceded by: J. R. Gray
- Succeeded by: Chris Freeland

Personal details
- Born: William Randall Coursey; October 22, 1978 (age 47)
- Party: Democratic
- Education: University of Kentucky

William Randall Coursey (born October 22, 1978) is a U.S. politician who served as a Democratic member of the Kentucky House of Representatives from 2008 to 2019, representing the 6th district. Coursey was first elected to the house in a February 2008 special election following the resignation of incumbent representative J. R. Gray. Coursey retired from the house in 2018 to unsuccessfully run for Judge/Executive of Marshall County. In March 2023 he was appointed to the Marshall County Board of Education following the resignation of Ledonia Williamson.

== Education ==
Coursey attended the University of Kentucky.

== Elections ==
- 2012 Coursey was unopposed for both the May 22, 2012 Democratic Primary and the November 6, 2012 General election, winning with 15,021 votes.
- 2008 When District 6 Representative J. R. Gray left the Legislature and left the seat open, Coursey was unopposed for both the 2008 Democratic Primary and the November 4, 2008 General election with 14,839 votes.
- 2010 Coursey was unopposed for the May 18, 2010 Democratic Primary and the November 2, 2010 General election, winning with 8,945 votes (54.7%) against Republican nominee Monti Collins.
