= Dan Johnson (Kentucky politician) =

American religious leader and legislator (1960–2017)

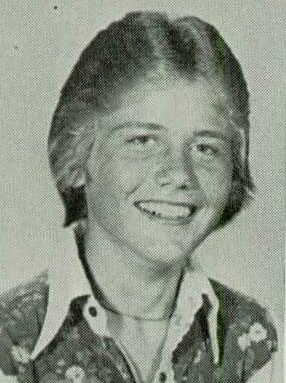
- Johnson in his 1978 high-school yearbook
- Born: Danny Ray Johnson; October 18, 1960; Bastrop, Louisiana, US
- Died: December 13, 2017 (aged 57); Mount Washington, Kentucky, US
- Cause of death: Suicide by gunshot
- Resting place: Mount Washington, Kentucky, US
- Occupations: Preacher; politician
- Political party: Republican
- Spouses: Tylia Harris (divorced); Rebecca Wilson (m. 1987)
- Children: 5
- Years active: 1977–2017

Ecclesiastical career
- Religion: Nondenominational; Christianity
- Church: Heart of Fire

Member of the Kentucky House of Representatives from the 49th district
- In office January 1, 2017 – December 13, 2017
- Preceded by: Linda H. Belcher
- Succeeded by: Linda H. Belcher

Signature
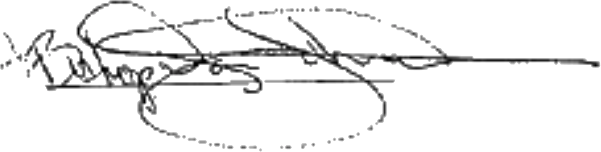

Danny Ray Johnson (October 18, 1960 – December 13, 2017) was an American religious leader and politician who died by suicide two days after the release of an exposé that refuted many of his extravagant biographical claims and gave details of criminal accusations against him.

Johnson was originally from Louisiana and became involved with Christianity in his youth. Johnson traveled with missionaries in Tennessee and South America before founding and leading the controversial Louisville-area Heart of Fire Church in the late 1970s. Heart of Fire eschewed the trappings of traditional Christian churches, and instead at times featured toplessness, cigarette smoking, underage drinking, anti-Islamism, and a tattoo parlor. In 1985, Johnson was indicted in an alleged scheme to set fire to his car for the purpose of insurance fraud, but the charges were dismissed in 1987 after he completed a diversionary program. After Heart of Fire was destroyed by church arson in 2000, Johnson was sued by his insurance provider, alleging insurance fraud; however, police never made any arrests, the lawsuit was settled in Johnson's favor, and the church was rebuilt.

Throughout his life, Johnson claimed to have been involved with many prominent Americans and in many important US events. In the 2010s, he became politically active, and despite a controversial campaign that included his own party leadership requesting his withdrawal, he was elected as a Republican to the Kentucky House of Representatives from the 49th District. After eleven months and nine days in office, an exposé by the Kentucky Center for Investigative Reporting was publicly released; it included many refutations of Johnson's self-described biography, as well as details of a 2013 child sexual abuse allegation. After denying the accusations of his alleged victim, Johnson fatally shot himself on December 13, 2017.

== Personal life ==
On October 18, 1960, Danny Ray Johnson was born to Jerry J. and Charlene Blocker Johnson in Bastrop, Louisiana; he was the middle child between sisters Teresa (older) and Rita (younger). Johnson graduated from Bastrop High School in 1979, and left home when 17 years old.

By his early 20s, Johnson had fathered a child, divorced his first wife—Tylia Harris, and filed for bankruptcy in Louisiana. Per his 1985 Jefferson County Police Department arrest record, Johnson was 6 feet 1 inch (1.85 m) tall and weighed 170 pounds (77 kg).

Johnson married his second wife, Rebecca Wilson (born August 17, 1961), in Jefferson County, Kentucky on February 14, 1987. By 2017, Johnson resided in Mount Washington, Kentucky, and had five children. Johnson was known for his hate speech, Facebook posts, "and general derision for African-Americans and Muslims".

== Refuted claims ==
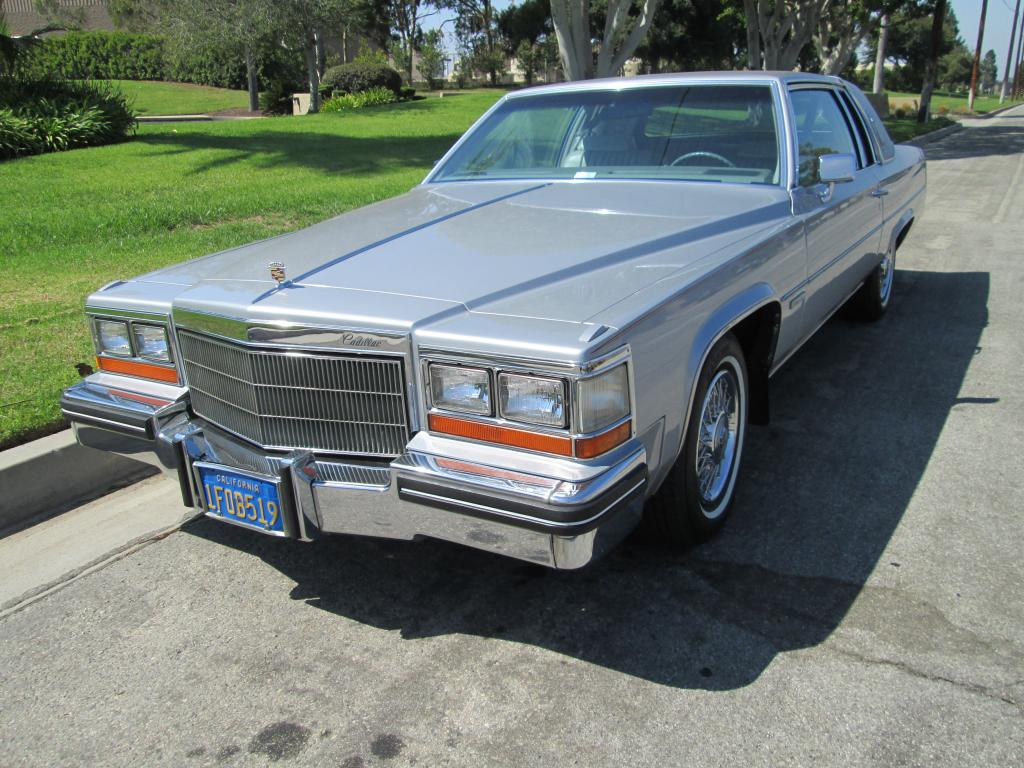
A 1982 Cadillac Coupe de Ville

On October 18, 1985, police in Louisville, Kentucky found two people about to set fire to Johnson's 1982 Cadillac Coupe de Ville. The suspects told police that Johnson had paid them over US$200 (equivalent to about $599 in 2025) to burn the car. Johnson initially signed a police report saying the vehicle was stolen, but later admitted to the insurance fraud scheme—he owed over $10,000 (equivalent to about $30,000 in 2025) on the vehicle, which also needed thousands in repairs. Felony and misdemeanor charges were dismissed in February 1987 after Johnson completed a six-month diversion program. In later years, Johnson said: "When the car came up missing, I didn't know what happened to the car. It was vandalized."

To Johnson's claim of having been the "White House Chaplain" to Presidents George H. W. Bush, Bill Clinton, and George W. Bush, an expert in the field confirmed that no such position exists; all three presidential libraries also confirmed "find[ing] no connection between Johnson and the White House". The Rev. Dr. Cecil Murray of the First African Methodist Episcopal Church of Los Angeles refuted Johnson's claim of setting up safe zones in that city during the 1992 Los Angeles riots, not only by virtue of not having seen the "golden-haired preacher from Kentucky" among the rioting people of color, but also because there were no "safe zones" during the six-day incident.

Johnson claimed to have seen the crash of United Airlines Flight 175 from his New Yorker Hotel room, a feat NBC News called unlikely for being in Midtown Manhattan, three miles (4.8 km) away from the towers. He regularly told of how he rushed to Ground Zero after the September 11 attacks, created an impromptu morgue, and administered last rites to victims for two weeks. Storm Swain, a professor of theology at Lutheran Theological Seminary at Philadelphia who authored a book on chaplains at Ground Zero, invalidated every aspect of Johnson's September 11 claims. In 2017, the Office of Chief Medical Examiner of the City of New York knew nobody who remembered Johnson. Johnson's 2016 and 2017 financial disclosures listed New York state workers' compensation as his only source of income.

Johnson had claimed, at times under oath, to hold a Doctor of Theology, a Doctor of Philosophy, and a Doctor of Divinity, the last of these from Kingsway University and Theological Seminary in Des Moines, Iowa; Kingsway confirmed that Johnson studied there, but said he did not graduate. In his 2016 election campaign, Johnson claimed that Ted Nugent had endorsed his election during a rally at Bowman Field; spokeswomen for the musician and airport both said they had no record of this.

== Religion ==
Johnson pointed to a childhood miracle as the incident that spurred his religiosity: he said a BB gun accident left him blinded in one or both of his eyes, his parents took him to a physician, and that he was seven years old when his blindness was miraculously cured. During his adolescence, Johnson attended the Swartz First Assembly of God Church in Monroe, Louisiana; Pastor Gerald Lewis recalls that Johnson, to whom he was a father figure and mentor, stopped attending church without warning or explanation. After graduating high school at age 17, Johnson left Bastrop to work with the McKeithens—a Christian missions group based out of Nashville, Tennessee—for two years.

When Dr. David Fischer was pastor of the Living Waters Church in Pasadena, California, he wrote a letter supporting alleged miracles performed by Johnson while Johnson was on a short-term mission to South America. Fischer said in his June 1991 correspondence that Johnson had cured a Venezuelan man of deafness and resurrected a Colombian man: "He spoke to death and commanded it to leave."

=== Heart of Fire Church ===
Heart of Fire Church
- Location: 657 Bogard Lane; Mount Washington, Kentucky
- Country: United States
- Denomination: Non-denominational
- Website: Official website (Archived on May 31, 2019)

History
- Founded: 1977

Clergy
- Pastor: Rebecca Johnson

According to the church's website, Johnson founded Heart of Fire Church in 1977, at 5101 Bardstown Road, with himself as its bishop.

Over its lifetime, Heart of Fire has drawn criticism from members of the local community and law-enforcement figures. Johnson frequently proselytized for political candidates (e.g. Donald Trump) from his pulpit, violating the conditions of Heart of Fire's tax-exempt status. Racism, toplessness, cigarette smoking, underage drinking, Islamophobia, and a tattoo parlor were all reported phenomena at Johnson's Heart of Fire Church throughout the years. Thrice in six years, the church was cited for selling alcoholic drinks without a liquor license; after a 2009 raid by the Kentucky Office of Alcoholic Beverage Control (ABC), Johnson was fined $250 (equivalent to about $375 in 2025) despite attempting to convince Judge Sheila Collins that the beer hidden from ABC agents was for communion rites.

After Dan Johnson died in 2017, his wife Rebecca took over as pastor of the church. As of December 2023, she was still president of Danny Johnson Heart of Fire Ministries, Inc.—doing business as Heart of Fire Church. The non-profit was still active and registered with the Secretary of State of Kentucky (ID number 0219846) at 657 Bogard Lane in Mount Washington, Kentucky.

==== Arson ====
In mid-2000, Brotherhood Mutual Insurance Company showed the non-denominational Heart of Fire Church was bankrupt: loans far exceeded the property's value, any potential sale, and the church's potential to ever settle. The church and Johnsons were also in financial straits with "dozens of bounced checks and credit card debts". Heart of Fire secretary and parishioner Michelle Cook explained how Johnson committed insurance fraud against Brotherhood Mutual to make money for himself.

On June 12, 2000, the church was set afire. A witness saw a "white, late-model Cadillac pulling out from behind the church with no lights on [whose] driver was a white guy who might have had blond hair"; Johnson, who was blond and owned a white 1995 Cadillac, instead blamed the Ku Klux Klan, saying the hate group had threatened the church. No charges were ever filed in the church arson. The losses were estimated at $1–1.75 million (equivalent to about $1.87–3.27M in 2025). Brotherhood Mutual sued Heart of Fire, saying that the church had been negligent in light of the alleged threats; both parties settled and the church was rebuilt.

==== Foreclosure ====
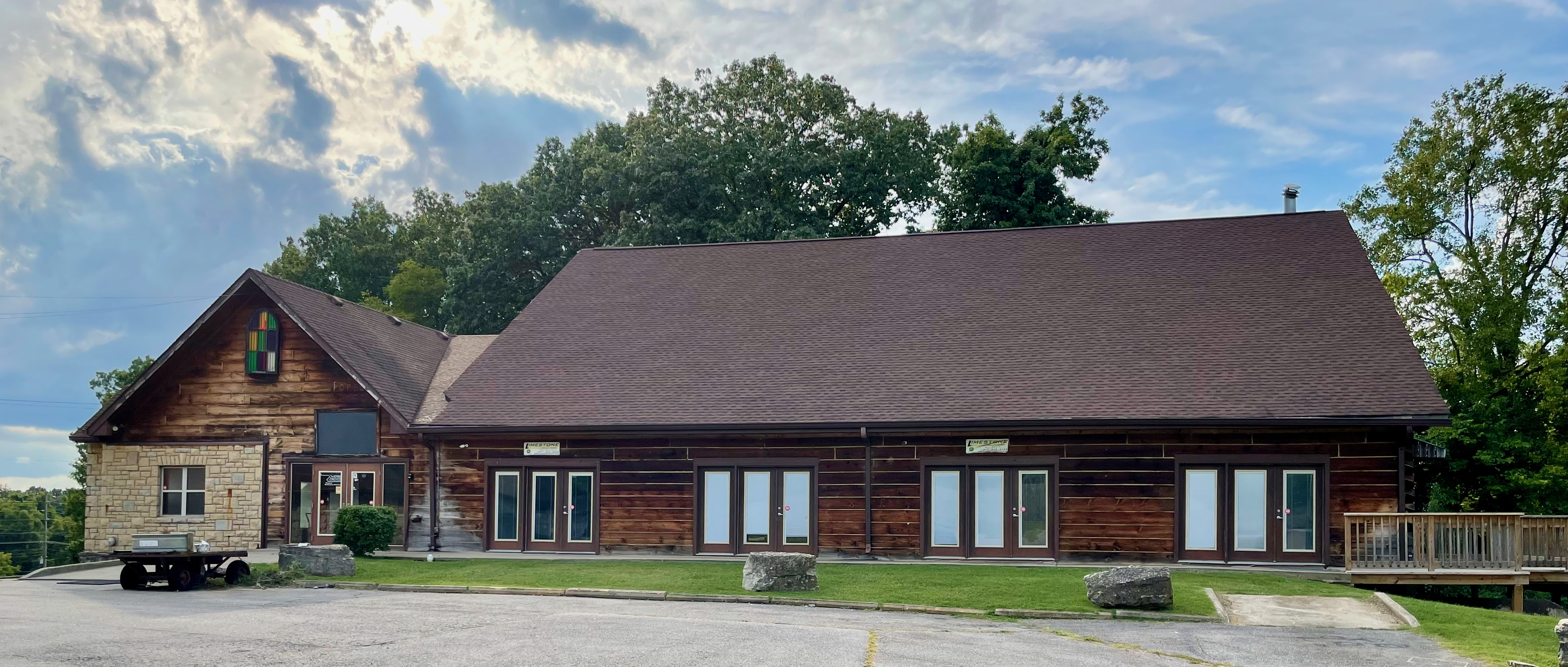
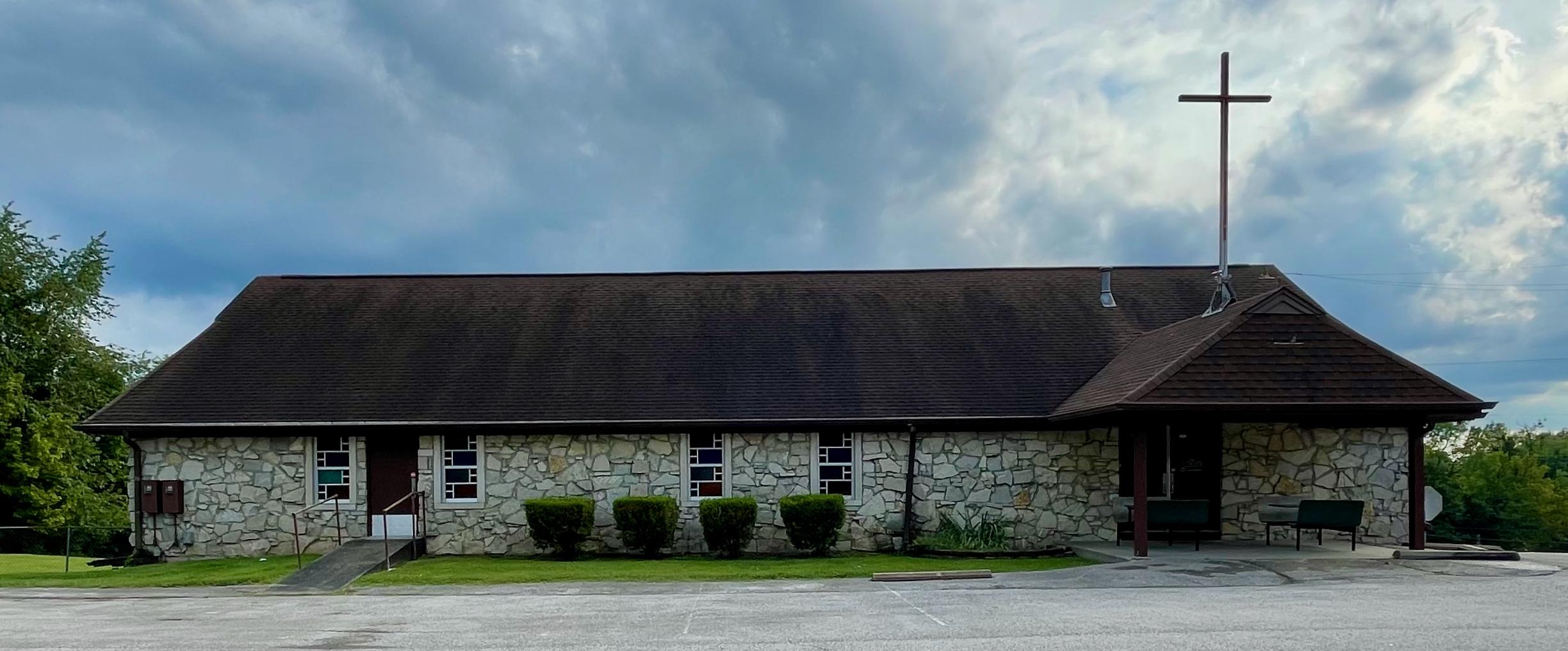
Buildings at the former Heart of Fire Church property (September 2021)

In the 1990s, the Clinton administration's Department of Housing and Urban Development (HUD) began offering loan guarantees to rebuild black churches that were victims of arson. In 2003, Heart of Fire received the third-largest of these federal loans for $1.5 million (equivalent to about $3M in 2025); the church used the money to buy the chancel it was leasing, and build a new fellowship hall-cum-bar. In 2019, Clinton-era HUD secretary Henry Cisneros described Heart of Fire's purchase and construction as not "meet[ing] the criteria that we originally had set". Less than a month after securing the guaranteed loan, and for the next 14 years, Johnson failed to have the loan forgiven. In 2009, the US federal government obtained the mortgage for Heart of Fire. In February 2018, HUD secured a court order of sale for the church—valued at $634,000 (equivalent to about $798,000 in 2025)—as the non-profit was more than $2.4M (equivalent to about $3.1M in 2025) in debt to the federal government. Heart of Fire was scheduled to hold a May 20, 2018 auction ("antiques, appliances, furniture, Harley Davidson parts and commercial kitchen equipment"), the purpose of which was described to WDRB by Pastor Rebecca Johnson as:

In 2000 our church was arsoned. It was considered a" hate crime". In 2001We started the process of filing under the Law passed by Pres Bill Clinton to restore arsoned churches. We received our first correspondence on Sept 5, 2001 from Hudd. […] Our church took up the restoration project in 2003 […]. We were initially supposed to get Grant as all other churches that filed did. They ran out of Grant money and said do it as a gaurnteed loan, Hud official in DC said we will get other funding. That never happened. This has been in court for years trying to get funds promised. Things were looking good till Dan died. They said he was dead on paper so none of the testimony counts from Dan or DC Hudd. So I ve signed with a Realtor and we're selling the property to pay the debt and relocate. […] We have an auction Sunday for items not needed in order to pay off part of construction loan put on my home. [sic]

== Rape allegation ==
At age eight, Maranda Richmond first attended Heart of Fire Church in 2004 with her father. She became friends with the Johnson children and considered Dan Johnson "a second dad". Richmond attended parties and sleepovers that were held at the church building as well as the Johnsons' house; occasionally alcoholic beverages were provided to the children by Johnson and other adults. Richmond told the Kentucky Center for Investigative Reporting (KyCIR) that she was raped by Johnson 15 days after her 17th birthday (the night of December 31, 2012); she had been staying with his daughter in the apartment under the fellowship hall. The following day, the two exchanged messages over Facebook:

[Johnson's daughter] Sarah said I was mean to Bo You and Her by telling you all to go to bed so sorry don’t remember I was told we all got drugged at TK’s anyway so sorry if I sounded mean, you know you are one of my favorites, love you sorry! Boaz did Great Sunday ! Your future Husband ! — Johnson	What you did was beyond mean, it was evil. Drugged or not, I think you know what happened that night and that’s why you’re sending this message. I never thought something like that would happen to me, especially by someone like you. I looked at you as a Dad, but now I sincerely hope I don’t see you again, but I might try to maintain a relationship with your kids. And there is no point in responding to this message either because I don’t want to talk about it ever again. — Richmond

Richmond and her parents went to the police in April 2013, but after failing to secretly record a confession from Johnson, the case was closed with no charges filed. Richmond saw a mental health professional the summer of 2013, and presented her "psychosocial assessment, notes and progress reports" to the KyCIR in 2017; the onetime honors student and drum major at Louisville Male High School had exhibited symptoms of post-traumatic stress disorder. After the KyCIR began investigating Johnson, the Louisville Metro Police Department reached out to Richmond and reopened the case at her request, but had made no actions as of five months later.

== Politics ==
In the 2010s, Johnson began to zealously express right-wing and libertarian political sentiments.

=== 2016 elections ===
Johnson ran in the Republican Party's primary for the 49th District's seat (representing part of Bullitt County, Kentucky) in the Kentucky House of Representatives; his political campaign mirrored his personal ideals of "supporting guns, liberty and pro-life causes". During a political rally at Heart of Fire, the church's billboard read, "Pray To Make America Great Again". Jennifer Stepp (a former Heart of Fire congregant) originally won the Republican primary, but was found by a judge to have been ineligible to run. The Bullitt County Republican Party executive committee held a secret ballot and selected Johnson as their replacement candidate.

In the general election for the 49th District's seat, Johnson faced the incumbent Democrat, Linda H. Belcher (born 1947/1948). Belcher had held the 49th seat for three terms after replacing her husband in 2008. Johnson eschewed their public debate in favor of making online accusations against Belcher, alleging that she ("lyin' Linda") had—among other accusations—instigated death threats and bomb threats, doxxed the Johnsons, and colluded with Barack Obama ("the Islam’crat") and Hillary Clinton to send "Chicago thugs" after Johnson's family. Belcher refuted Johnson's claims, but otherwise ran a subdued campaign, focusing instead on her record as representative. Also during his campaign, Johnson made several Facebook posts that racially-targeted the family of Barack Obama, and then refused to withdraw from the race even at the request of the Republican Party of Kentucky.

On Election Day 2016, Republican Donald Trump received almost 75% of Bullitt County's votes for president, while Johnson defeated Belcher by 156 votes.

2016, general, Kentucky state representative, 49th District
Party	Candidate	Votes	%
Republican	Dan Johnson	9,342	50.42
Democratic	Linda H. Belcher	9,186	49.58

=== Representative ===
While Johnson's constitutional tenure in the Kentucky House began on January 1, 2017, legislators didn't begin work until January 3, 2017. According to his House of Representatives profile, he was a Republican and a Kentucky Colonel.

Despite its unconstitutionality, Johnson filed a bill (Abolition of Abortion in Kentucky Act) to make abortions performed in Kentucky illegal. Physicians who performed abortions under the proposed law could be charged with "fetal homicide—a felony that can be charged as a capital offense but isn't eligible for the death penalty". Johnson also filed bills concerning freedom of speech. One such proposal would have forced public universities to allow the promulgation of speech that is "offensive, unwise, immoral, indecent, disagreeable, conservative, liberal, traditional, radical, or wrongheaded". The other would require all internet-accessible computers sold in Kentucky to come pre-installed with software to block "obscenity, child pornography, revenge pornography, and prostitution". He successfully co-sponsored a bill allowing Kentucky schools to offer bible-literacy classes.

As of November 14, 2017, he was a member of the House's committees on: State Government; Tourism, Small Business, and Information Technology; Transportation; Veterans, Military Affairs, and Public Protection; Elections, Constitutional Amendments, and Intergovernmental Affairs; and Tourism and Outdoor Recreation.

== Exposé and suicide ==
On December 11, 2017, the Kentucky Center for Investigative Reporting (KyCIR) released an exposé on Johnson ("The Pope's Long Con"), the culmination of over seven months of investigations and more than 100 interviews. Both Democrats and Republicans called for his resignation from the Kentucky General Assembly. The Republican governor of Kentucky, Matt Bevin, called Johnson "an embarrassment", while the Democratic mayor of Louisville Metro initiated a review of Richmond's 2013 allegations.

North end of the Salt River bridge carrying Greenwell Ford Road

Johnson's gravestone and accompanying bench in Mount Washington, Kentucky

Johnson held a press conference two days later at Heart of Fire Church where he denied the accusations of sexual assault, instead saying that Richmond's claims stemmed from their political differences. That afternoon at 4:59 p.m., Johnson posted a rambling missive to Facebook. After pinging the assemblyman's phone, police found his body on the north bank of the Salt River in Mount Washington, Kentucky; standing by his car at the nearby bridge, he had shot himself in the head with a .40-caliber pistol. The time of death was recorded as 8:20 p.m. The next day, Rebecca Johnson told reporters, "These high-tech lynchings based on lies and half-truths can’t be allowed to win the day"; on Today, she blamed the KyCIR ("that little greasy reporter") for her husband's death. Dan Johnson was interred in a Mount Washington cemetery on December 18, 2017.

Nominated by the Bullitt County Republican Party, Rebecca Johnson sought election to her husband's position as state representative from the 49th District. Of the 4,947 votes cast in the February 20, 2018 special election, Democrat Linda H. Belcher received 68.45 percent; Johnson blamed electoral fraud for her loss. By February 2018, both women were registered for the 2018 general election, though Johnson withdrew the following month, saying, "I feel my time can be best served with my family and my ministry".

2018, special, Kentucky state representative, 49th District
Party	Candidate	Votes	%
Democratic	Linda H. Belcher	3,386	68.45
Republican	Rebecca Johnson	1,561	31.55

== See also ==
- 2017–18 United States political sexual scandals – Heightened period of allegations
- Douglas R. Stringfellow – US soldier, politician, and military impostor (1922–1966)
