= Mary C. Harper =

American educator and politician

Mary Harper

Member of the Kentucky House of Representatives from the 49th district
- In office January 1, 2003 – January 1, 2007
- Preceded by: Larry Belcher
- Succeeded by: Larry Belcher

Personal details
- Born: May 13, 1929
- Died: May 9, 2012 (aged 82)
- Party: Republican

Mary Catherine Harper (née Wigginton; May 13, 1929 – May 9, 2012) was an American educator and politician.

Harper was born in Louisville, Kentucky and lived in Shepherdsville, Kentucky. She graduated from Spalding University and did graduate studies at DePaul University and University of Louisville. She taught school in Bullitt County, Kentucky. Harper served in the Kentucky House of Representatives from 2003 to 2007. Harper died at Jewish Hospital South in Shepherdsville, Kentucky. She was first elected to the house in 2002 when incumbent Larry Belcher ran for the Kentucky Senate. Belcher ran for the seat again in 2006 and defeated Harper.
