= Battletown, Kentucky =

Unincorporated community in Kentucky, United States

- Unincorporated community
- Location within the state of Kentucky Battletown (the United States)
- Coordinates: 38°03′50″N 86°17′38″W
- Country: United States
- State: Kentucky
- County: Meade
- Elevation: 696 ft (212 m)
- Time zone: UTC-5 (Eastern (EST))
  - Summer (DST): UTC-4 (EST)
- ZIP code: 40104
- GNIS feature ID: 486474

Battletown is an unincorporated rural community in Meade County, Kentucky, United States. It is a small unincorporated community that lies a few miles northwest of Brandenburg on KY 228, at its intersection with Pine Ridge Road.

== Notable people ==
- Rick Stansbury, college basketball coach, born in Battletown in 1959
