= Greg Stumbo =

American politician

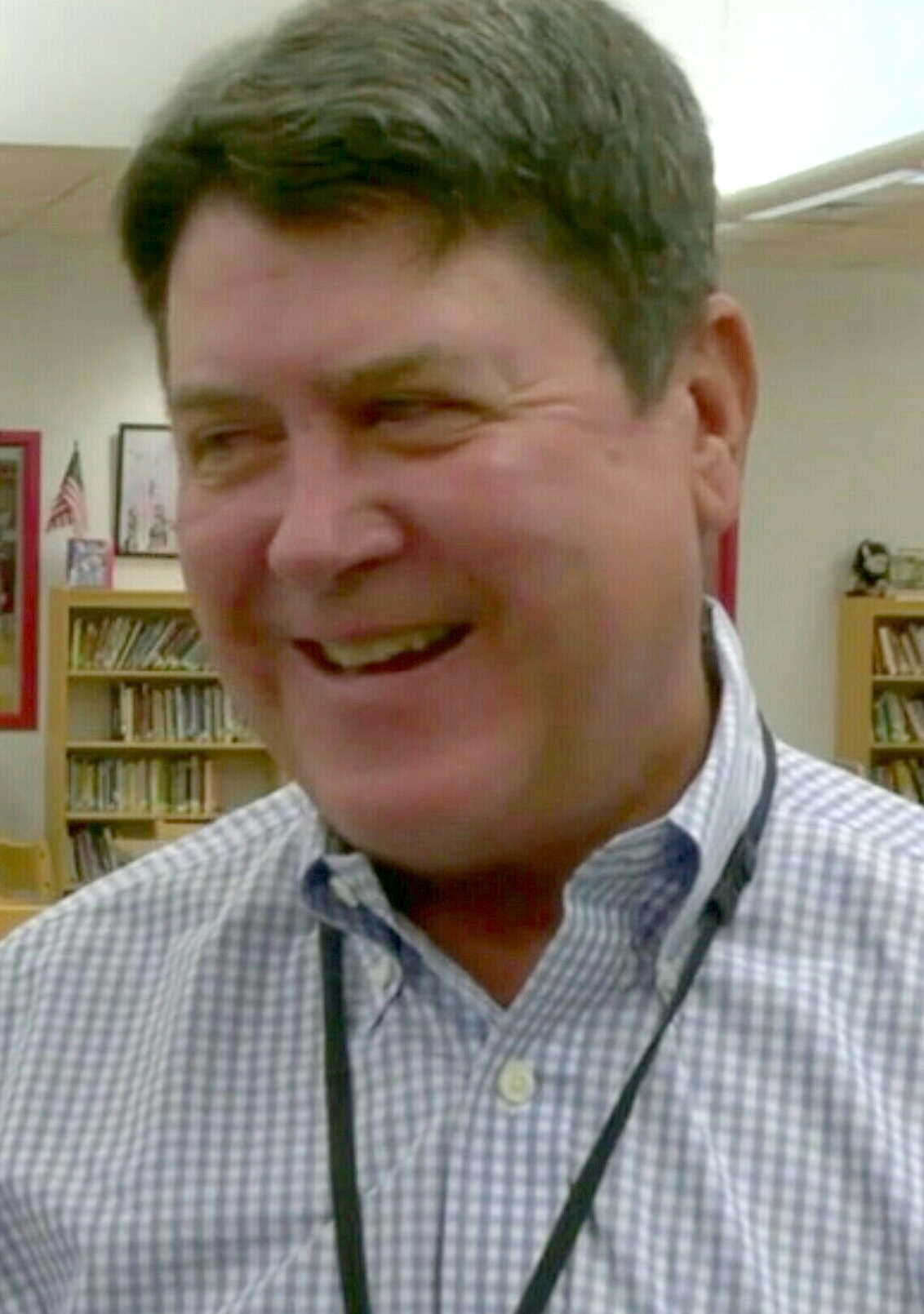
- Stumbo in 2016

92nd Speaker of the Kentucky House of Representatives
- In office January 6, 2009 – January 1, 2017
- Preceded by: Jody Richards
- Succeeded by: Jeff Hoover

Member of the Kentucky House of Representatives from the 95th district
- In office February 11, 2008 – January 1, 2017
- Preceded by: Brandon Spencer
- Succeeded by: Larry D. Brown
- In office January 1, 1980 – January 5, 2004
- Preceded by: James Allen
- Succeeded by: Chuck Meade

48th Attorney General of Kentucky
- In office January 5, 2004 – January 7, 2008
- Governor: Ernie Fletcher; Steve Beshear
- Preceded by: Ben Chandler
- Succeeded by: Jack Conway

Majority Leader of the Kentucky House of Representatives
- In office January 8, 1985 – January 5, 2004
- Speaker: Donald Blandford; Joe Clarke; Jody Richards
- Preceded by: Jim LeMaster
- Succeeded by: Rocky Adkins

Personal details
- Born: Gregory D. Stumbo; August 14, 1951 (age 74) Prestonsburg, Kentucky, U.S.
- Party: Democratic
- Spouse: Mary Karen (m. 1998)
- Education: University of Kentucky (BA); University of Louisville (JD)

Gregory D. Stumbo (born August 14, 1951) is an American lawyer and former speaker of the Kentucky House of Representatives. A member of the Democratic Party, he served as Kentucky attorney general from 2004 to 2008. He was the Democratic candidate for the 2019 election for attorney general.

== Background and education ==
Stumbo graduated from the University of Kentucky, where he was a member of the Sigma Chi fraternity. He then received his J.D. degree from the University of Louisville Brandeis School of Law.

== Early career ==
A native of Prestonsburg in Floyd County, Stumbo served as Assistant Floyd County Attorney and held the position of Martin City Attorney for three years. He also served as trial commissioner to the Floyd County District Court for one year.

Prior to his election as attorney general, Stumbo served in the Kentucky House of Representatives for twelve terms, from 1980 to 2003. During this time Stumbo was Kentucky's longest-serving House Majority Leader (1985–2003). Stumbo returned to the House of Representatives not long after his attorney general term ended.

== Attorney General of Kentucky ==
Stumbo was elected as attorney general in November 2003, taking office in January 2004.

Stumbo's office led an investigation into the hiring practices of Kentucky Republican governor Ernie Fletcher which resulted in indictments, but was dismissed by agreement with the prosecutors. On September 12, 2007, Stumbo sued Fletcher for appointing too many Republicans to the governing bodies of state universities. State law requires "proportional representation of the two leading political parties" based on voter registration. A majority of registered voters in Kentucky are Democrats, but Fletcher appointed seven Republicans and two Democrats to the University of Kentucky and eight Republicans and two Democrats to the University of Louisville.

Stumbo was also, in his time as Attorney General, known for leading a somewhat controversial and very effective attack on the sale of prescription drugs over the internet and through "pill mills", which led to the most stringent laws preventing these sales in the nation. The Ryan Haight Act, the federal law that prohibits the internet-only-based sale of narcotic prescription drugs by these same websites was modeled on the law Stumbo passed in Kentucky. A large part of the controversy surrounding Stumbo's efforts to control the sale of internet "prescriptions" was based in the objections of other states, who saw Stumbo's efforts intruding on their own state sovereignty and authority, particularly in the states where the internet pharmacy sites were based. Stumbo also faced considerable criticism from pain patient's rights groups, particularly The Pain Relief Network and its president, Siobhan Reynolds, who threatened to file lawsuits challenging the constitutionality of the proposed law. The suit was never filed and the law became the first in the nation requiring registration of internet pharmacies, wherever they were located, in the state in order for them to deliver any medication to Kentucky.

In 2019, Stumbo became the Democratic nominee for attorney general once again, running unopposed in the Democratic primary. His major party opponent was Daniel Cameron, a lawyer in private practice who had won the Republican primary. Cameron had worked for two years, beginning in 2011, for U.S. senator Mitch McConnell. Cameron told The Courier-Journal on December 21, 2018, that, if elected, he intended to focus on Kentucky's prescription opioid crisis. Cameron defeated Stumbo, 57.7% to 42.3%.

== Other statewide elections ==
Stumbo was the running mate for Bruce Lunsford in the 2007 Democratic gubernatorial primary, but their ticket lost to that of Steve Beshear and Daniel Mongiardo, 40.9% to 20.4%.

Stumbo formed an exploratory committee to run against Senator Mitch McConnell in 2008, but did not run for the office.

== Speaker of the Kentucky House of Representatives ==
On January 6, 2009, he was endorsed by Democratic lawmakers to be the party's nominee for Speaker of the House. He was sworn in as Speaker the next day, January 7.

Stumbo advocates creating new usable land for recreational opportunities from strip mining techniques, as well as other forms of post-mining economic reclamation. As an indication of his commitment to Kentucky's coal industry, Stumbo built his home in Prestonburg on a clearing where a mountaintop used to be, near the manicured 18-hole Stone Crest Golf Course.

On November 8, 2016, Stumbo was defeated by Republican challenger Larry D. Brown In reaction to this, the Republican Kentucky governor Matt Bevin, who had strongly opposed Stumbo and vice versa, remarked "'good riddance'...he will not be missed one bit. Kentucky will be better for his absence."

== Law career ==
In 2013, Stumbo became a partner at the Florida-based personal injury law firm Morgan & Morgan.

Party political offices
Preceded by Ben Chandler	Democratic nominee for Attorney General of Kentucky; 2003	Succeeded by Jack Conway
Preceded by Andy Beshear	Democratic nominee for Attorney General of Kentucky; 2019	Succeeded by Pamela Stevenson
Legal offices
Preceded by Ben Chandler	Attorney General of Kentucky; January 5, 2004 – January 7, 2008	Succeeded by Jack Conway
Political offices
Preceded by Jim LeMaster	Majority leader of the Kentucky House of Representatives; January 8, 1985 – January 5, 2004	Succeeded by Rocky Adkins
Preceded by Jody Richards	Speaker of the Kentucky House of Representatives; January 6, 2009 – January 1, 2017	Succeeded by Jeff Hoover
