= John Bowling =

John Bowling may refer to:

- John C. Bowling, president of Olivet Nazarene University
- John Bowling (politician), member of the Kentucky House of Representatives
