= Kentucky's 14th House of Representatives district =

American legislative district

Kentucky's 14th State House of Representatives district
Representative
Scott Lewis; R–Hartford
since January 1, 2019
- Registration: 56.2% Republican; 35.4% Democratic; 7.9% No party preference
- Demographics: 93.0% White; 1.0% Black; 3.3% Hispanic; 0.2% Asian; 0.1% Hawaiian/Pacific Islander; 0.3% Other; 2.2% Multiracial
- Population (2023): 44,014
- Registered voters (2025): 33,728

Kentucky's 14th House of Representatives district is one of 100 districts in the Kentucky House of Representatives. Located in the western part of the state, it comprises the counties of Hancock, Ohio, and part of Daviess. It has been represented by Scott Lewis (R–Hartford) since 2019. As of 2023, the district had a population of 44,014.

== Voter registration ==
On January 1, 2025, the district had 33,728 registered voters, who were registered with the following parties.

Party	Registration	
Party	Voters	%
Republican	18,949	56.18
Democratic	11,934	35.38
Independent	1,093	3.24
Libertarian	140	0.42
Green	18	0.05
Constitution	10	0.03
Socialist Workers	5	0.01
Reform	3	0.01
"Other"	1,576	4.67
Total	33,728	100.00
Source: Kentucky State Board of Elections

== List of members representing the district ==
Member	Party	Years	Electoral history	District location
Don Blandford (Philpot)	Democratic	January 1, 1968 – May 3, 1993	Elected in 1967. Reelected in 1969. Reelected in 1971. Reelected in 1973. Reelected in 1975. Reelected in 1977. Reelected in 1979. Reelected in 1981. Reelected in 1984. Reelected in 1986. Reelected in 1988. Reelected in 1990. Reelected in 1992. Resigned.	1964–1972; Daviess County (part).
Don Blandford (Philpot)	Democratic	January 1, 1968 – May 3, 1993	Elected in 1967. Reelected in 1969. Reelected in 1971. Reelected in 1973. Reelected in 1975. Reelected in 1977. Reelected in 1979. Reelected in 1981. Reelected in 1984. Reelected in 1986. Reelected in 1988. Reelected in 1990. Reelected in 1992. Resigned.	1972–1974; Daviess County (part).
Don Blandford (Philpot)	Democratic	January 1, 1968 – May 3, 1993	Elected in 1967. Reelected in 1969. Reelected in 1971. Reelected in 1973. Reelected in 1975. Reelected in 1977. Reelected in 1979. Reelected in 1981. Reelected in 1984. Reelected in 1986. Reelected in 1988. Reelected in 1990. Reelected in 1992. Resigned.	1974–1985; Daviess County (part).
Don Blandford (Philpot)	Democratic	January 1, 1968 – May 3, 1993	Elected in 1967. Reelected in 1969. Reelected in 1971. Reelected in 1973. Reelected in 1975. Reelected in 1977. Reelected in 1979. Reelected in 1981. Reelected in 1984. Reelected in 1986. Reelected in 1988. Reelected in 1990. Reelected in 1992. Resigned.	1985–1993; Daviess County (part).
Don Blandford (Philpot)	Democratic	January 1, 1968 – May 3, 1993	Elected in 1967. Reelected in 1969. Reelected in 1971. Reelected in 1973. Reelected in 1975. Reelected in 1977. Reelected in 1979. Reelected in 1981. Reelected in 1984. Reelected in 1986. Reelected in 1988. Reelected in 1990. Reelected in 1992. Resigned.	1993–1997; Daviess County (part).
Mark Treesh (Philpot)	Republican	June 1993 – January 1, 2003	Elected to finish Blandford's term. Reelected in 1994. Reelected in 1996. Reelected in 1998. Reelected in 2000. Retired to run for the Kentucky Senate.	1993–1997; Daviess County (part).
Mark Treesh (Philpot)	Republican	June 1993 – January 1, 2003	Elected to finish Blandford's term. Reelected in 1994. Reelected in 1996. Reelected in 1998. Reelected in 2000. Retired to run for the Kentucky Senate.	1997–2003
Tommy Thompson (Owensboro)	Democratic	January 1, 2003 – January 1, 2017	Elected in 2002. Reelected in 2004. Reelected in 2006. Reelected in 2008. Reelected in 2010. Reelected in 2012. Reelected in 2014. Lost reelection.	2003–2015
Tommy Thompson (Owensboro)	Democratic	January 1, 2003 – January 1, 2017	Elected in 2002. Reelected in 2004. Reelected in 2006. Reelected in 2008. Reelected in 2010. Reelected in 2012. Reelected in 2014. Lost reelection.	2015–2023
Matt Castlen (Owensboro)	Republican	January 1, 2017 – January 1, 2019	Elected in 2016. Retired to run for the Kentucky Senate.	2015–2023
Scott Lewis (Hartford)	Republican	January 1, 2019 – present	Elected in 2018. Reelected in 2020. Reelected in 2022. Reelected in 2024. Retired.	2015–2023
Scott Lewis (Hartford)	Republican	January 1, 2019 – present	Elected in 2018. Reelected in 2020. Reelected in 2022. Reelected in 2024. Retired.	2023–present
Wes Pate (Lewisport)	Republican	Assuming office January 1, 2027	Elected in 2026.	2023–present
