= Kentucky's 54th House of Representatives district =

American legislative district

Kentucky's 54th State House of Representatives district
Representative
| Daniel Elliott; R–Danville |
since March 15, 2016
- Registration: 59.3% Republican; 31.7% Democratic; 8.4% No party preference
- Demographics: 86.3% White; 4.7% Black; 4.3% Hispanic; 0.6% Asian; 0.5% Other; 3.7% Multiracial
- Population (2024): 46,855
- Registered voters (2026): 32,890

Kentucky's 54th House of Representatives district is one of 100 districts in the Kentucky House of Representatives. Located in the central part of the state, it comprises Boyle and Casey Counties. It has been represented by Daniel Elliott (R–Danville) since 2016. As of 2024, the district had a population of 46,855.

== Voter registration ==
On January 1, 2026, the district had 32,890 registered voters, who were registered with the following parties.

| Party | Registration | |
| Party | Voters | % |
|---|---|---|
| Republican | 19,517 | 59.34 |
| Democratic | 10,422 | 31.69 |
| Independent | 1,511 | 4.59 |
| Libertarian | 145 | 0.44 |
| Green | 22 | 0.07 |
| Constitution | 15 | 0.05 |
| Reform | 4 | 0.01 |
| Socialist Workers | 3 | 0.01 |
| "Other" | 1,251 | 3.80 |
| Total | 32,890 | 100.00 |

== List of members representing the district ==
| Member | Party | Years | Electoral history | District location |
|---|---|---|---|---|
| Joseph Clarke (Danville) | Democratic | January 1, 1972 – January 1, 1999 | Redistricted from the 50th district and reelected in 1971. Reelected in 1973. Reelected in 1975. Reelected in 1977. Reelected in 1979. Reelected in 1981. Reelected in 1984. Reelected in 1986. Reelected in 1988. Reelected in 1990. Reelected in 1992. Reelected in 1994. Reelected in 1996. Retired. | 1972–1974; Boyle and Garrard Counties. |
| Joseph Clarke (Danville) | Democratic | January 1, 1972 – January 1, 1999 | Redistricted from the 50th district and reelected in 1971. Reelected in 1973. Reelected in 1975. Reelected in 1977. Reelected in 1979. Reelected in 1981. Reelected in 1984. Reelected in 1986. Reelected in 1988. Reelected in 1990. Reelected in 1992. Reelected in 1994. Reelected in 1996. Retired. | 1974–1985; Boyle, Marion (part), and Washington (part) Counties. |
| Joseph Clarke (Danville) | Democratic | January 1, 1972 – January 1, 1999 | Redistricted from the 50th district and reelected in 1971. Reelected in 1973. Reelected in 1975. Reelected in 1977. Reelected in 1979. Reelected in 1981. Reelected in 1984. Reelected in 1986. Reelected in 1988. Reelected in 1990. Reelected in 1992. Reelected in 1994. Reelected in 1996. Retired. | 1985–1993; Boyle and Lincoln (part) Counties. |
| Joseph Clarke (Danville) | Democratic | January 1, 1972 – January 1, 1999 | Redistricted from the 50th district and reelected in 1971. Reelected in 1973. Reelected in 1975. Reelected in 1977. Reelected in 1979. Reelected in 1981. Reelected in 1984. Reelected in 1986. Reelected in 1988. Reelected in 1990. Reelected in 1992. Reelected in 1994. Reelected in 1996. Retired. | 1993–1997; Boyle and Lincoln (part) Counties. |
| Joseph Clarke (Danville) | Democratic | January 1, 1972 – January 1, 1999 | Redistricted from the 50th district and reelected in 1971. Reelected in 1973. Reelected in 1975. Reelected in 1977. Reelected in 1979. Reelected in 1981. Reelected in 1984. Reelected in 1986. Reelected in 1988. Reelected in 1990. Reelected in 1992. Reelected in 1994. Reelected in 1996. Retired. | 1997–2003 |
| John Bowling (Danville) | Democratic | January 1, 1999 – January 1, 2003 | Elected in 1998. Reelected in 2000. Retired to run for mayor of Danville. | 1997–2003 |
| Mike Harmon (Junction City) | Republican | January 1, 2003 – January 3, 2016 | Elected in 2002. Reelected in 2004. Reelected in 2006. Reelected in 2008. Reelected in 2010. Reelected in 2012. Reelected in 2014. Resigned after being elected Kentucky Auditor of Public Accounts. | 2003–2015 |
| Mike Harmon (Junction City) | Republican | January 1, 2003 – January 3, 2016 | Elected in 2002. Reelected in 2004. Reelected in 2006. Reelected in 2008. Reelected in 2010. Reelected in 2012. Reelected in 2014. Resigned after being elected Kentucky Auditor of Public Accounts. | 2015–2023 |
| Daniel Elliott (Danville) | Republican | March 15, 2016 – present | Elected to finish Harmon's term. Reelected in 2016. Reelected in 2018. Reelected in 2020. Reelected in 2022. Reelected in 2024. Reelected in 2026. | 2015–2023 |
| Daniel Elliott (Danville) | Republican | March 15, 2016 – present | Elected to finish Harmon's term. Reelected in 2016. Reelected in 2018. Reelected in 2020. Reelected in 2022. Reelected in 2024. Reelected in 2026. | 2023–present |
