= 2027 Kentucky Secretary of State election =

- November 2, 2027
Incumbent Secretary of State
Michael Adams
Republican

The 2027 Kentucky Secretary of State election will be held on November 2, 2027, to elect the Kentucky Secretary of State. The winner will succeed Republican incumbent Michael Adams, who is term limited and ineligible to seek a third consecutive term. Primary elections will be held on May 18, 2027.

== Republican primary ==
=== Candidates ===
==== Declared ====
- Mike Harmon, former auditor of public accounts (2016–2024)
- John "Brad" Holsclaw, lobbyist
- John "Jack" Whitfield, attorney
- Nick Wilson, state representative from HD-82 (2023–present)

==== Declined ====
- Josh Bray, state representative from HD-71 (2021–present)
- John Hodgson, state representative from HD-36 (2023–present)

== Democratic primary ==
=== Candidates ===
==== Declared ====
- Adam Moore, state representative from HD-45 (2025–present)

==== Publicly expressed interest ====
- Erin Petrey, writer and candidate for Kentucky's 6th congressional district in 2026
