= Kentucky's 20th House of Representatives district =

American legislative district

Kentucky's 20th State House of Representatives district
Representative
| Kevin Jackson; R–Bowling Green |
since January 1, 2023
- Registration: 44.3% Democratic; 42.7% Republican; 12.1% No party preference
- Demographics: 74.2% White; 6.0% Black; 7.3% Hispanic; 7.4% Asian; 0.1% Native American; 0.1% Hawaiian/Pacific Islander; 0.2% Other; 4.7% Multiracial
- Population (2023): 48,631
- Registered voters (2025): 31,809

Kentucky's 20th House of Representatives district is one of 100 districts in the Kentucky House of Representatives. Located in the western part of the state, it comprises part of Warren County. It has been represented by Kevin Jackson (R–Bowling Green) since 2023. As of 2023, the district had a population of 48,631.

== Voter registration ==
On January 1, 2025, the district had 31,809 registered voters, who were registered with the following parties.

| Party | Registration | |
| Party | Voters | % |
|---|---|---|
| Democratic | 14,087 | 44.29 |
| Republican | 13,571 | 42.66 |
| Independent | 1,989 | 6.25 |
| Libertarian | 213 | 0.67 |
| Green | 46 | 0.14 |
| Constitution | 19 | 0.06 |
| Socialist Workers | 11 | 0.03 |
| Reform | 3 | 0.01 |
| "Other" | 1,870 | 5.88 |
| Total | 31,809 | 100.00 |
Source: Kentucky State Board of Elections

== List of members representing the district ==
| Member | Party | Years | Electoral history | District location |
|---|---|---|---|---|
| Nicholas Kafoglis (Bowling Green) | Democratic | January 1, 1972 – January 1, 1976 | Elected in 1971. Reelected in 1973. Retired. | 1972–1974; Warren County (part). |
| Nicholas Kafoglis (Bowling Green) | Democratic | January 1, 1972 – January 1, 1976 | Elected in 1971. Reelected in 1973. Retired. | 1974–1985; Warren County (part). |
| Jody Richards (Bowling Green) | Democratic | January 1, 1976 – January 1, 2019 | Elected in 1975. Reelected in 1977. Reelected in 1979. Reelected in 1981. Reelected in 1984. Reelected in 1986. Reelected in 1988. Reelected in 1990. Reelected in 1992. Reelected in 1994. Reelected in 1996. Reelected in 1998. Reelected in 2000. Reelected in 2002. Reelected in 2004. Reelected in 2006. Reelected in 2008. Reelected in 2010. Reelected in 2012. Reelected in 2014. Reelected in 2016. Retired. | 1974–1985; Warren County (part). |
| Jody Richards (Bowling Green) | Democratic | January 1, 1976 – January 1, 2019 | Elected in 1975. Reelected in 1977. Reelected in 1979. Reelected in 1981. Reelected in 1984. Reelected in 1986. Reelected in 1988. Reelected in 1990. Reelected in 1992. Reelected in 1994. Reelected in 1996. Reelected in 1998. Reelected in 2000. Reelected in 2002. Reelected in 2004. Reelected in 2006. Reelected in 2008. Reelected in 2010. Reelected in 2012. Reelected in 2014. Reelected in 2016. Retired. | 1985–1993; Warren County (part). |
| Jody Richards (Bowling Green) | Democratic | January 1, 1976 – January 1, 2019 | Elected in 1975. Reelected in 1977. Reelected in 1979. Reelected in 1981. Reelected in 1984. Reelected in 1986. Reelected in 1988. Reelected in 1990. Reelected in 1992. Reelected in 1994. Reelected in 1996. Reelected in 1998. Reelected in 2000. Reelected in 2002. Reelected in 2004. Reelected in 2006. Reelected in 2008. Reelected in 2010. Reelected in 2012. Reelected in 2014. Reelected in 2016. Retired. | 1993–1997; Warren County (part). |
| Jody Richards (Bowling Green) | Democratic | January 1, 1976 – January 1, 2019 | Elected in 1975. Reelected in 1977. Reelected in 1979. Reelected in 1981. Reelected in 1984. Reelected in 1986. Reelected in 1988. Reelected in 1990. Reelected in 1992. Reelected in 1994. Reelected in 1996. Reelected in 1998. Reelected in 2000. Reelected in 2002. Reelected in 2004. Reelected in 2006. Reelected in 2008. Reelected in 2010. Reelected in 2012. Reelected in 2014. Reelected in 2016. Retired. | 1997–2003 |
| Jody Richards (Bowling Green) | Democratic | January 1, 1976 – January 1, 2019 | Elected in 1975. Reelected in 1977. Reelected in 1979. Reelected in 1981. Reelected in 1984. Reelected in 1986. Reelected in 1988. Reelected in 1990. Reelected in 1992. Reelected in 1994. Reelected in 1996. Reelected in 1998. Reelected in 2000. Reelected in 2002. Reelected in 2004. Reelected in 2006. Reelected in 2008. Reelected in 2010. Reelected in 2012. Reelected in 2014. Reelected in 2016. Retired. | 2003–2015 |
| Jody Richards (Bowling Green) | Democratic | January 1, 1976 – January 1, 2019 | Elected in 1975. Reelected in 1977. Reelected in 1979. Reelected in 1981. Reelected in 1984. Reelected in 1986. Reelected in 1988. Reelected in 1990. Reelected in 1992. Reelected in 1994. Reelected in 1996. Reelected in 1998. Reelected in 2000. Reelected in 2002. Reelected in 2004. Reelected in 2006. Reelected in 2008. Reelected in 2010. Reelected in 2012. Reelected in 2014. Reelected in 2016. Retired. | 2015–2023 |
| Patti Minter (Bowling Green) | Democratic | January 1, 2019 – January 1, 2023 | Elected in 2018. Reelected in 2020. Lost reelection. | 2015–2023 |
| Kevin Jackson (Bowling Green) | Republican | January 1, 2023 – present | Elected in 2022. Reelected in 2024. Reelected in 2026. | 2023–present |
