= Scott Lewis (politician) =

American politician

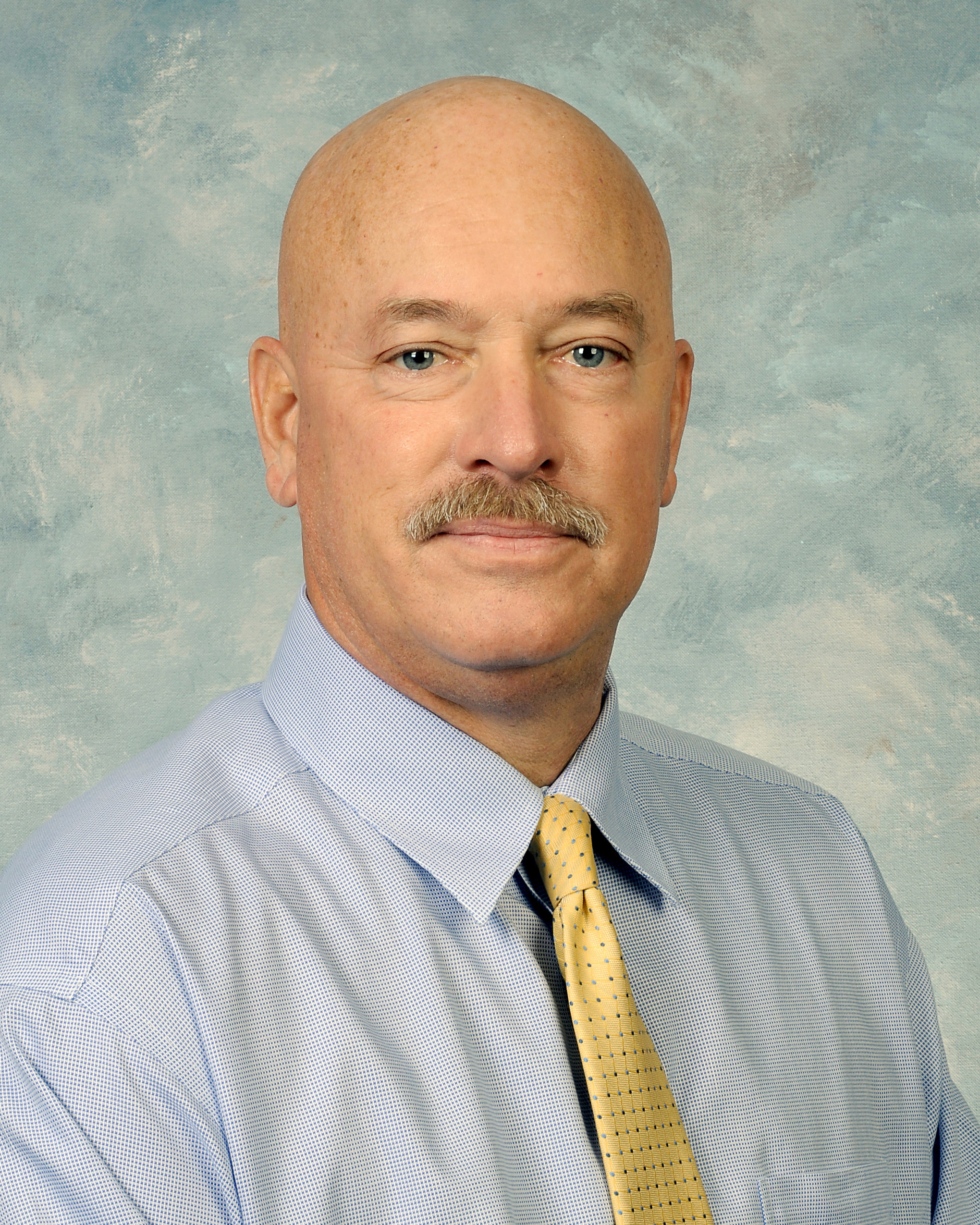
- Official portrait, 2018

Member of the Kentucky House of Representatives from the 14th district
- Incumbent
- Assumed office January 1, 2019
- Preceded by: Matt Castlen
- Succeeded by: Wes Pate (elect)

Personal details
- Born: June 2, 1961 (age 65)
- Party: Republican
- Committees: Primary and Secondary Education (Chair); Elections, Const. Amendments & Intergovernmental Affairs; Veterans, Military Affairs, & Public Protection

Anthony Scott Lewis (born June 2, 1961) is an American politician who has served as a Republican member of the Kentucky House of Representatives since January 2019. He represents Kentucky's 14th House district, which includes Hancock and Ohio counties as well as part of Daviess County. He was first elected in 2018 when incumbent Matt Castlen retired to run for the Kentucky Senate. Lewis did not seek reelection in 2026.

== Background ==
Lewis graduated from Stuart High School before attending the University of Louisville and earning a Bachelor of Science degree. He also graduated from the Kentucky State Police Academy in Frankfort. Later, he earned a Master of Arts degree and Rank I Certification from Western Kentucky University.

Lewis served as a Kentucky State Trooper in Daviess County. He has been employed as an educator at various levels including as a teacher, coach, and principal before being chosen as superintendent of Hancock County Schools in 2006. He served in this position for six years before being chosen as superintendent of Ohio County Schools in 2012. He resigned from his position on December 31, 2018, following his election to the Kentucky House of Representatives.

Lewis owns and operates storage unit rental company.

He has also held various community roles such as serving as a board member of the Ohio County Health Department, Ohio County Fair, Ohio County Industrial Foundation, Ohio County Economic Development Alliance, First United Bank Advisory Board, Owensboro Community and Technical College Foundation, and Ohio County Wellness Center. Lewis has also held statewide positions as well such as president of Green River Regional Educational Cooperative, and member of the Kentucky High School Athletic Association Board of Control, Kentucky Association of School Administrators, and Kentucky Association of School Superintendents.

== Political career ==
=== Elections ===
- 2018 Lewis won the 2018 Republican primary with 2,555 votes and won the 2018 Kentucky House of Representatives election against Democratic candidate Elizabeth Belcher, winning with 11,757 votes.
- 2020 Lewis was unopposed in both the 2020 Republican primary and the 2020 Kentucky House of Representatives election, winning with 19,304 votes.
- 2022 Lewis was unopposed in both the 2022 Republican primary and the 2022 Kentucky House of Representatives election, winning with 12,313 votes.
- 2024 Lewis was unopposed in the 2024 Republican primary and won the 2024 Kentucky House of Representatives election with 17,093 votes (80.6%) against Democratic candidate Chanda Garner.
