= Morris Weintraub =

American politician (1909–1996)

82nd Speaker of the Kentucky House of Representatives
- In office January 7, 1958 – January 1, 1960
- Preceded by: Thomas P. Fitzpatrick
- Succeeded by: Harry Lowman

Member of the Kentucky House of Representatives from the 63rd district
- In office January 1, 1946 – January 1, 1960
- Preceded by: Carl Scheben
- Succeeded by: James E. Murphy

Member of the Kentucky Senate from the 25th district
- In office January 1, 1940 – January 1, 1944
- Preceded by: Aubrey Barbour
- Succeeded by: Ira W. See (redistricting)

Personal details
- Born: May 14, 1909
- Died: January 19, 1996 (aged 86)
- Party: Democratic

Morris Aron Weintraub (May 14, 1909 – January 19, 1996) was an American politician from Kentucky who was a member of the Kentucky House of Representatives from 1946 to 1960 and the Kentucky Senate from 1940 to 1944, serving for one term as the former's speaker.

Weintraub was first elected to the senate in 1939; he served one term before being defeated for reelection by Republican John Garvey Davis. He was elected to the house in 1945 and was reelected six times. He unssuccessully sought the Democratic nomination for Kentucky's 5th congressional district in 1956 and 1958. He was elected Speaker of the Kentucky House of Representatives during the 1958 session. He did not seek reelection in 1959.

Weintraub was Jewish. He died on January 19, 1996, at age 86.
