= Stan Lee (politician) =

American politician (born 1961)

Member of the Kentucky House of Representatives from the 45th district
- In office January 1, 2001 – January 1, 2021
- Preceded by: Stan Cave
- Succeeded by: Killian Timoney

Personal details
- Born: Joseph Stanley Lee; September 26, 1961 (age 64) Marion County, Kentucky, U.S.
- Party: Republican
- Spouse: Tami Lee
- Children: 1
- Occupation: attorney

Joseph Stanley Lee (born September 26, 1961) is an American politician in the state of Kentucky. He was born in Marion County, Kentucky.

Lee, an attorney, attended the University of Kentucky where he received a Bachelor of Science and Juris Doctor.

Lee was elected to the Kentucky House of Representatives in 2000 following the retirement of incumbent representative Stan Cave. He represented the 45th district, as a Republican. He sat on the Judiciary, Natural Resources and the Local Government Committees. From 2006 to 2008 he was the minority whip. He did not seek reelection in 2020.

Lee is married to Tami and has one daughter. He is a member of the Kentucky Bar, U.S. District Court for the Eastern and Western Districts of Kentucky, U.S. Court of Appeals for the Sixth Circuit, and the Fayette County, Kentucky, and American Bar Associations. He previously practiced law as a partner with Bowles Rice Attorneys at Law.

== Awards ==
- Defending Liberty Award from Bluegrass Institute for Public Policy Solutions (2009)
- Recipient of Protector of Economic Freedom Award from Kentucky Club for Growth (2007, 2008 and 2009)
- Recipient of Public Policy Award from the American Diabetes Association (2006)

Party political offices
Preceded by Jack D. Wood	Republican nominee for Attorney General of Kentucky; 2007	Succeeded by Todd P'Pool
