= Mike Harmon (politician) =

American politician

- Harmon in 2025

Auditor of Kentucky
- In office January 4, 2016 – January 1, 2024
- Governor: Matt Bevin; Andy Beshear
- Preceded by: Adam Edelen
- Succeeded by: Allison Ball

Member of the Kentucky House of Representatives from the 54th district
- In office January 1, 2003 – January 3, 2016
- Preceded by: John Bowling
- Succeeded by: Daniel Elliott

Personal details
- Born: October 16, 1966 (age 60) Harrodsburg, Kentucky, U.S.
- Party: Republican
- Education: Eastern Kentucky University (BS)
- Website: Official website

James Michael Harmon (born October 16, 1966) is an American politician who served as the Kentucky auditor of public accounts from 2016 to 2024. He was previously a Republican member of the Kentucky House of Representatives for the 54th district. He was a 2011 candidate for Lieutenant Governor of Kentucky, but lost in the primary.

In 2015, Harmon was elected state auditor, after defeating Democratic incumbent Adam Edelen. He was the only Republican statewide candidate to run unopposed in the primary. He was elected to a second term as auditor in 2019. He ran in the primary for the 2023 gubernatorial election.

Harmon is currently a candidate for secretary of state of Kentucky in 2027.

== Education and employment ==
Harmon earned a Bachelor of Science from Eastern Kentucky University.

Harmon was a mortgage originator from 2006 to 2011. He became an associate insurance agent in 2010.

== Political career ==
=== Campaigns for District 54, lieutenant governor, and state auditor ===
Harmon did not face any opposition in the 1998 Republican primary for the District 54 seat (as continued to be the case through the 2012 primary). But Harmon lost the 1998 general election to the Democratic nominee, John Bowling. Two years later, Harmon again lost the 2000 general election to Bowling.

When Bowling left the Legislature, Harmon won the 2002 general election with 7,035 votes (57.6%) against Democrat William Erwin. Harmon won the general elections in 2004 with 9,459 votes (56.3%) against Democrat David Sparrow, in 2006 with 6,000 votes (50.3%) against Sparrow, and in 2008 with 9,375 votes (53.5%) against Sparrow, and was unopposed in 2010.

Harmon joined gubernatorial candidate Phil Moffett as his running mate for the 2011 Republican primary for governor, but they lost to President of the Kentucky Senate David L. Williams and Agricultural Commissioner Richie Farmer, who in turn lost the 2011 general election to incumbent governor Steve Beshear and Democratic lieutenant governor nominee Jerry Abramson. He won the 2012 general election for District 54 with 9,482 votes (54.8%) against Democrat Barry Harmon.

Harmon was unopposed for the Republican nomination for the office of State Auditor against incumbent Democrat Adam Edelen, won with 51.9% of the vote (486,280 votes to 449,960), and was sworn in as Kentucky's 47th state auditor in January 2016. He was again unopposed in the Republican primary election, and was re-elected to a second term in the general election. Harmon garnered 55.6% of the vote (779,327) against his opponents, Democrat Sheri Donahue and Libertarian Kyle Hugenberg.

=== 2023 Kentucky gubernatorial Republican primary ===
Harmon ran in the 2023 Kentucky gubernatorial Republican primary, against a number of Kentucky Republicans, including former U.S. Ambassador to the United Nations Kelly Craft, state Attorney General Daniel Cameron, and state Agriculture Commissioner Ryan Quarles.

As of the end of the third quarter of 2022, he had cash on hand amounting to $31,000 for his campaign, less than the amounts of cash on hand of each of his opponents. In the fourth quarter of 2022 his campaign raised $3,800, ending with $26,000 on hand. In a January 2023 poll he received support from 5% of respondents. He lost the Republican primary to Kentucky Attorney General Daniel Cameron.

=== 2027 Kentucky secretary of state election ===
On October 7, 2026, Harmon declared his candidacy for secretary of state of Kentucky in the 2027 election.

Party political offices
Preceded by John Kemper	Republican nominee for Auditor of Kentucky; 2015, 2019	Succeeded by Allison Ball
Political offices
Preceded by Adam Edelen	Auditor of Kentucky; 2016–2024	Succeeded by Allison Ball
