= Chuck Meade =

American politician

Member of the Kentucky House of Representatives from the 95th district
- In office February 23, 2004 – January 1, 2007
- Preceded by: Greg Stumbo
- Succeeded by: Brandon Spencer

Personal details
- Party: Democratic

Chuck Meade (born 1970) is an American politician from Kentucky who was a member of the Kentucky House of Representatives from 2004 to 2007. Meade was first elected in a February 2004 special election following the resignation of incumbent representative Greg Stumbo to become attorney general. He was defeated for renomination in 2006 by Brandon Spencer.
