= Stan Cave =

American politician

Member of the Kentucky House of Representatives from the 45th district
- In office January 1, 1993 – January 1, 2001
- Preceded by: Jerry Toby (redistricting)
- Succeeded by: Stan Lee

Personal details
- Born: January 16, 1963 (age 63)
- Party: Republican

Stanton Lynn Cave (born January 16, 1963) is an American politician from Kentucky who was a member of the Kentucky House of Representatives from 1993 to 2001. In 1992 redistricting moved the 45th district from Louisville to Lexington, moving incumbent representative Jerry Toby to the 29th district. Cave was then elected to the new Lexington-based 45th district. He did not seek reelection in 2000.
