= Matt Castlen =

American politician

Member of the Kentucky Senate from the 8th district
- In office January 1, 2019 – January 1, 2023
- Preceded by: Joseph R. Bowen
- Succeeded by: Gary Boswell

Member of the Kentucky House of Representatives from the 14th district
- In office January 1, 2017 – January 1, 2019
- Preceded by: Tommy Thompson
- Succeeded by: Scott Lewis

Personal details
- Born: August 14, 1986 (age 39)
- Party: Republican

Phillip Matthew Castlen (born August 14, 1986) is an American politician who last served in the Kentucky Senate representing the 8th district from 2019 to 2023. He previously served in the Kentucky House of Representatives from the 14th district from 2017 to 2019.
