= Frank Miller (Kentucky politician) =

American politician

Member of the Kentucky Senate from the 32nd district
- In office January 1, 1974 – January 1, 1987
- Preceded by: Ray B. White
- Succeeded by: Nicholas Kafoglis

Personal details
- Born: 1936
- Died: February 5, 1994 (aged 57)
- Party: Democratic

Frank Miller (1936 – February 5, 1994) was an American politician from Kentucky who was a member of the Kentucky Senate from 1974 to 1987. Miller was first elected in 1973 after incumbent senator Ray B. White retired. In 1986, he was defeated for renomination by Nicholas Kafoglis.

In 1984, Miller unsuccessfully ran for Kentucky's 2nd congressional district, losing the Democratic nomination to incumbent representative William Natcher.

Miller died on February 5, 1994.
