= Patti Minter =

American politician

Member of the Kentucky House of Representatives from the 20th district
- In office January 1, 2019 – January 1, 2023
- Preceded by: Jody Richards
- Succeeded by: Kevin Jackson

Personal details
- Born: October 1, 1964 (age 62)
- Party: Democratic
- Spouse: Michael
- Children: 1
- Education: University of Tennessee, University of Virginia
- Website: pattiminterforky.com

Patricia Hagler Minter (born October 1, 1964) is an American politician. She is a Democrat who represented the 20th district in the Kentucky House of Representatives from 2019 to 2023. In 2024, she unsuccessfully ran for mayor of Bowling Green.

== Education ==
Minter earned a bachelor's degree in history from the University of Tennessee in 1986, and a PhD in history from the University of Virginia in 1994.

== Political career ==
In 2018, Minter was elected to represent the 20th district in the Kentucky House of Representatives.

Minter lost reelection to Republican Kevin Jackson in 2022.

== Electoral record ==
2018 Democratic primary election: Kentucky House of Representatives, District 20
Party	Candidate	Votes	%
Democratic	Patti Minter	1,333	43.7%
Democratic	Rick DuBose	870	28.5%
Democratic	Ashlea Shepherd Porter	360	11.8%
Democratic	Brian Nash	281	9.2%
Democratic	Eldon John Renaud	208	6.8%

2018 general election: Kentucky House of Representatives, District 20
Party	Candidate	Votes	%
Democratic	Patti Minter	6,253	53.5%
Republican	Benjamin Lawson	5,436	46.5%
