= Nicholas Kafoglis =

American politician and physician (1930–2019)

Member of the Kentucky Senate from the 32nd district
- In office January 1, 1987 – January 1, 1999
- Preceded by: Frank Miller
- Succeeded by: Brett Guthrie

Member of the Kentucky House of Representatives from the 20th district
- In office January 1, 1972 – January 1, 1976
- Preceded by: George T. Massey
- Succeeded by: Jody Richards

Personal details
- Born: January 16, 1930 Lexington, Kentucky, U.S.
- Died: February 9, 2019 (aged 89) Branford, Connecticut, U.S.
- Party: Democratic
- Education: Yale University; University of Pennsylvania

Nicholas Zacharias Kafoglis (January 16, 1930 – February 9, 2019) was an American politician and physician in the state of Kentucky.

Kafoglis served in the Kentucky House of Representatives from 1972 to 1976 and in the Kentucky Senate from 1987 to 1999. He was a Democrat. A 1998 survey by the Kentucky Center for Public Issues rated Kafoglis as the most effective legislator in the senate. Kafoglis was born in Lexington, Kentucky and went to the Lexington public schools. He received his bachelor's and medical degrees from Yale University and the University of Pennsylvania. Kafoglis was a physician and lived in Bowling Green, Kentucky. Kafoglis served in the United States Air Force. He was the son of Greek immigrants. He died in Branford, Connecticut after breaking his hip.
