= Tommy Thompson (Kentucky politician) =

American politician

Majority Whip of the Kentucky House of Representatives
- In office January 4, 2011 – January 6, 2015
- Preceded by: John Stacy
- Succeeded by: Johnny Bell

Member of the Kentucky House of Representatives from the 14th district
- In office January 1, 2003 – January 1, 2017
- Preceded by: Mark Treesh
- Succeeded by: Matt Castlen

Personal details
- Born: October 10, 1948 (age 77) Owensboro, Kentucky
- Party: Democratic
- Education: University of Florida; Indiana University
- Website: votetommythompson.com

Thomas Nichols Thompson (born October 10, 1948) is an American politician and a Democratic member of the Kentucky House of Representatives from 2003 to 2017, representing district 14. Thompson was first elected in 2002 when Republican incumbent Mark Treesh retired to run for the Kentucky Senate. He was defeated for reelection in 2016 by Matt Castlen.

== Education ==
Thompson earned his bachelor's degree from the University of Florida and his MBA from the Indiana University School of Business.

== Elections ==
- 2012 Thompson was unopposed for the May 22, 2012 Democratic Primary and won the November 6, 2012 General election with 12,107 votes (58.0%) against Republican nominee Marian Turley.
- 2002 When District 21 Republican Representative Mark Treesh ran for Kentucky Senate and left the seat open, Thompson was unopposed for the 2002 Democratic Primary and won the November 5, 2002 General election with 7,625 votes (56.6%) against Republican nominee Ray Askins.
- 2004 Thompson was challenged in the 2004 Democratic Primary, winning with 2,300 votes (72.3%) and won the November 2, 2004 General election with 11,015 votes (55.9%) against Republican nominee Steve Winkler.
- 2006 Thompson was unopposed for both the 2006 Democratic Primary and the November 7, 2006 General election, winning with 11,493 votes.
- 2008 Thompson was unopposed for both the 2008 Democratic Primary and the November 4, 2008 General election, winning with 15,410 votes.
- 2010 Thompson was unopposed for the May 18, 2010 Democratic Primary and won the November 2, 2010 General election with 11,282 votes (67.0%) against Republican nominee Paul Estep.
