= Brandon Spencer =

American politician

Member of the Kentucky House of Representatives from the 95th district
- In office January 1, 2007 – December 18, 2007
- Preceded by: Chuck Meade
- Succeeded by: Greg Stumbo

Constable of Floyd County
- In office January 2003 – January 2007
- Constituency: 1st district

Personal details
- Party: Republican; Democratic (former)

James Brandon Spencer (born April 12, 1975) is an American politician from Kentucky. First elected as a constable in Floyd County, Spencer was elected to the Kentucky House of Representatives from the 95th district as a member of the Democratic Party in 2006 after defeating incumbent representative Chuck Meade in the primary election. He later resigned from the house less than one year into his term. In 2014, Spencer unsuccessfully ran for Floyd County Sheriff, losing the Democratic nomination.

Spencer has since changed political parties, becoming a Republican. He ran for the 95th district in 2022, losing to incumbent representative Ashley Tackett Laferty. He ran for the seat in 2024, losing again to Tackett Laferty.

== Electoral history ==
=== 2006 ===
Democratic primary results
Party	Candidate	Votes	%
Democratic	James Brandon Spencer	6,138	44.7
Democratic	Charles "Chuck" Meade (incumbent)	5,865	42.7
Democratic	James Frankie Francis	1,730	12.6
Total votes		13,733	100.0

2006 Kentucky House of Representatives 95th district election
Party	Candidate	Votes	%
Democratic	James Brandon Spencer	Unopposed	
Total votes		8,478	100.0
Democratic hold			

=== 2014 ===
Democratic primary results
Party	Candidate	Votes	%
Democratic	John Hunt	5,324	38.5
Democratic	Steve Little	4,335	31.3
Democratic	James "Brandon" Spencer	3,236	23.4
Democratic	Darren Lawson	796	5.8
Democratic	Ronald W. Blackburn	149	1.1
Total votes		13,840	100.0

=== 2022 ===
Republican primary results
Party	Candidate	Votes	%
Republican	Brandon Spencer	1,110	58.3
Republican	David Pennington	793	41.7
Total votes		1,903	100.0

2022 Kentucky House of Representatives 95th district election
Party	Candidate	Votes	%
Democratic	Ashley Tackett Laferty (incumbent)	8,775	59.8
Republican	Brandon Spencer	5,890	40.2
Total votes		14,665	100.0
Democratic hold			

=== 2024 ===
Republican primary results
Party	Candidate	Votes	%
Republican	Brandon Spencer	967	67.0
Republican	David Pennington	478	33.0
Total votes		1,445	100.0

2024 Kentucky House of Representatives 95th district election
Party	Candidate	Votes	%
Democratic	Ashley Tackett Laferty (incumbent)	10,721	56.3
Republican	Brandon Spencer	8,330	43.7
Total votes		19,051	100.0
Democratic hold			
