= 2019 Kentucky Attorney General election =

- November 5, 2019
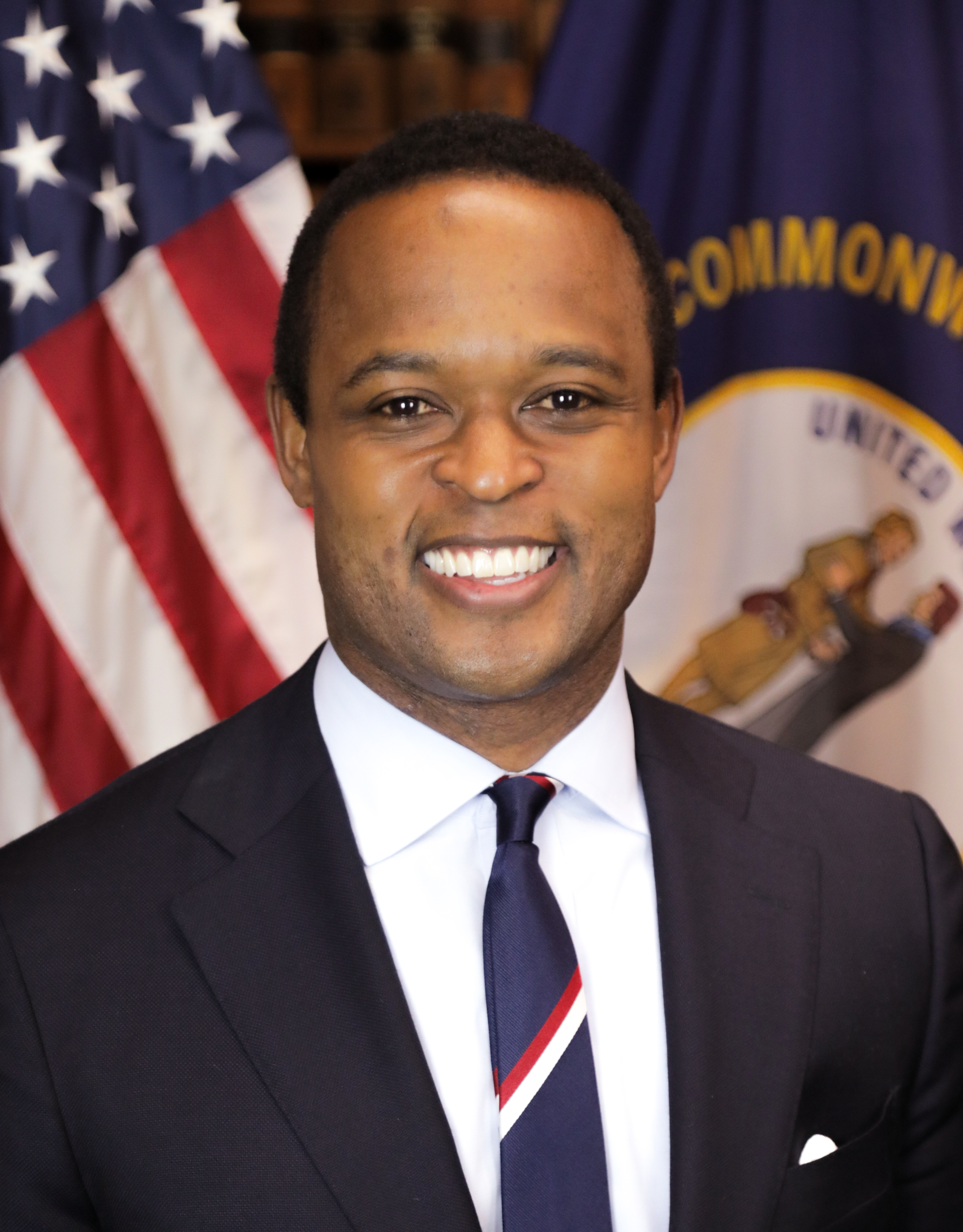

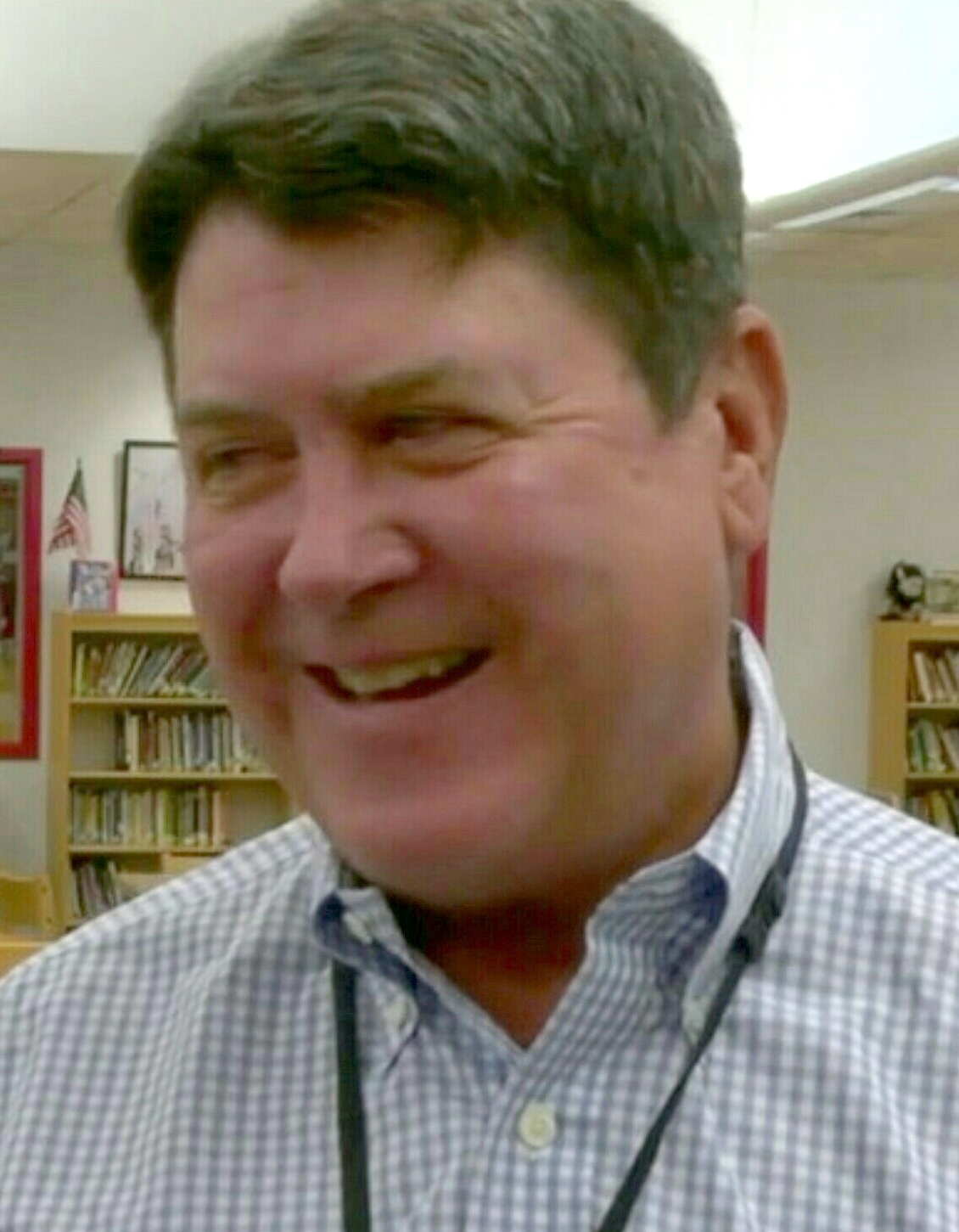
Nominee	Daniel Cameron	Greg Stumbo
Party	Republican	Democratic
Popular vote	823,343	602,218
Percentage	57.8%	42.2%
- Cameron: 50–60% 60–70% 70–80% 80–90% >90% Stumbo: 50–60% 60–70% 70–80% 80–90% >90% Tie: 50% No data
Attorney General before election
Andy Beshear
Democratic
Elected Attorney General
Daniel Cameron
Republican

The 2019 Kentucky Attorney General election was conducted on November 5. Primary elections occurred on May 21, 2019. The general election was held on November 5, 2019. Incumbent Democratic Attorney General Andy Beshear declined to seek reelection to a second term to instead successfully run for Governor. Republican nominee Daniel Cameron won with 57.8% of the vote. He became the first Republican elected attorney general of Kentucky since Eldon S. Dummit in 1943, and the state's first black attorney general.

== Democratic primary ==
=== Candidates ===
==== Declared ====
- Greg Stumbo, former Attorney General of Kentucky and former Speaker of the Kentucky House of Representatives

== Republican primary ==
=== Candidates ===
==== Declared ====
- Daniel Cameron, attorney for Senator Mitch McConnell and former University of Louisville football player
- Wil Schroder, member of the Kentucky Senate for the 24th District

==== Withdrawn ====
- Whitney Westerfield, member of the Kentucky Senate for the 3rd District and candidate for Attorney General in 2015

=== Polling ===
Poll source	Date(s) administered	Sample size	Margin of error	Daniel Cameron	Wil Schroder	Undecided
Cygnal	May 10–12, 2019	600	± 4.0%	26%	19%	55%

=== Results ===
Republican primary results
Party	Candidate	Votes	%
Republican	Daniel Cameron	132,580	55.4%
Republican	Wil Schroder	106,950	44.6%
Total votes		239,530	100.0%

== General election ==
The general election took place on November 5, 2019, following the May 21 primary elections.

=== Endorsements ===
Daniel Cameron (R)

U.S. federal officials

- Donald Trump, 45th president of the United States
- Ben Carson, U.S. Secretary of Housing and Urban Development
- Tim Scott, U.S. senator (R-SC)
- James Comer, U.S. representative (R-KY)

State and local officials

- Max Wise, state senator
- Damon Thayer, state senator
- John Schickel, state senator
- Kevin Bratcher, state representative
- Jason Nemes, state representative
- Jerry T. Miller, state representative
- Savannah Maddox, state representative

Individuals

- Patrick Morrisey, Attorney General of West Virginia
- Jason Ravnsborg, Attorney General of South Dakota

Organizations

- Kentucky Fraternal Order of Police

Newspapers

- Bowling Green Daily News
Greg Stumbo (D)

State officials

- McKenzie Cantrell, Kentucky State Representative
- Bill Clouse, Judge on Kentucky's 25th Circuit Court
- Adam Edelen, former Auditor of Kentucky and 2019 gubernatorial candidate
- Nima Kulkarni, Kentucky State Representative
- Mary Lou Marzian, Kentucky State Representative
- Joni Jenkins, Kentucky State Representative
- Derrick Graham, Kentucky State Representative

Local and county officials

- Robert Blythe, Mayor of Richmond, Kentucky
- Mike Coyle, Sheriff of Madison County, Kentucky

Individuals

- Amy McGrath, retired marine fighter pilot and nominee for KY-6 in 2018

Organizations

- Kentucky State AFL–CIO
- Kentucky Educators PAC
- Kentucky United Auto Workers
- United Steelworkers
- International Union of Painters and Allied Trades
- International Brotherhood of Boilermakers
- International Brotherhood of Teamsters
- International Union of Operating Engineers
- United Mine Workers of America
- Laborers' International Union of North America (LIUNA)
- Better Schools Kentucky

=== Predictions ===
Source	Ranking	As of
Cook	Lean R (flip)	October 25, 2019

=== Polling ===
Poll source	Date(s) administered	Sample size	Margin of error	Greg Stumbo (D)	Daniel Cameron (R)	Other	Undecided
The Trafalgar Group (R)	October 29 – November 2, 2019	1,117	± 3.0%	43%	57%	0%	0%
Clarity Campaign Labs (D) (Note: Poll sponsored by Democratic Attorney General Association)	August 12–13, 2019	792	± 3.3%	46%	39%	3%	13%
Gravis Marketing	June 11–12, 2019	741	± 3.6%	36%	47%	–	16%
WPA Intelligence (R)	June 2019	900	± 3.3%	37%	44%	–	18%

=== Results ===
Kentucky Attorney General election, 2019
Party	Candidate	Votes	%	±%
Republican	Daniel Cameron	823,343	57.8%	+7.9%
Democratic	Greg Stumbo	602,218	42.2%	−7.9%
Total votes		1,425,561	100.00%	
Republican gain from Democratic				

==== By congressional district ====
Cameron won five of six congressional districts.

District	Stumbo	Cameron	Representative
1st	33%	67%	James Comer
2nd	36%	64%	Brett Guthrie
3rd	60%	40%	John Yarmuth
4th	37%	63%	Thomas Massie
5th	32%	68%	Hal Rogers
6th	49%	51%	Andy Barr

== See also ==
- 2019 United States elections
- 2019 Kentucky elections
- 2019 Kentucky gubernatorial election

== Notes ==
Partisan clients
