= Killian Timoney =

American politician (born 1975)

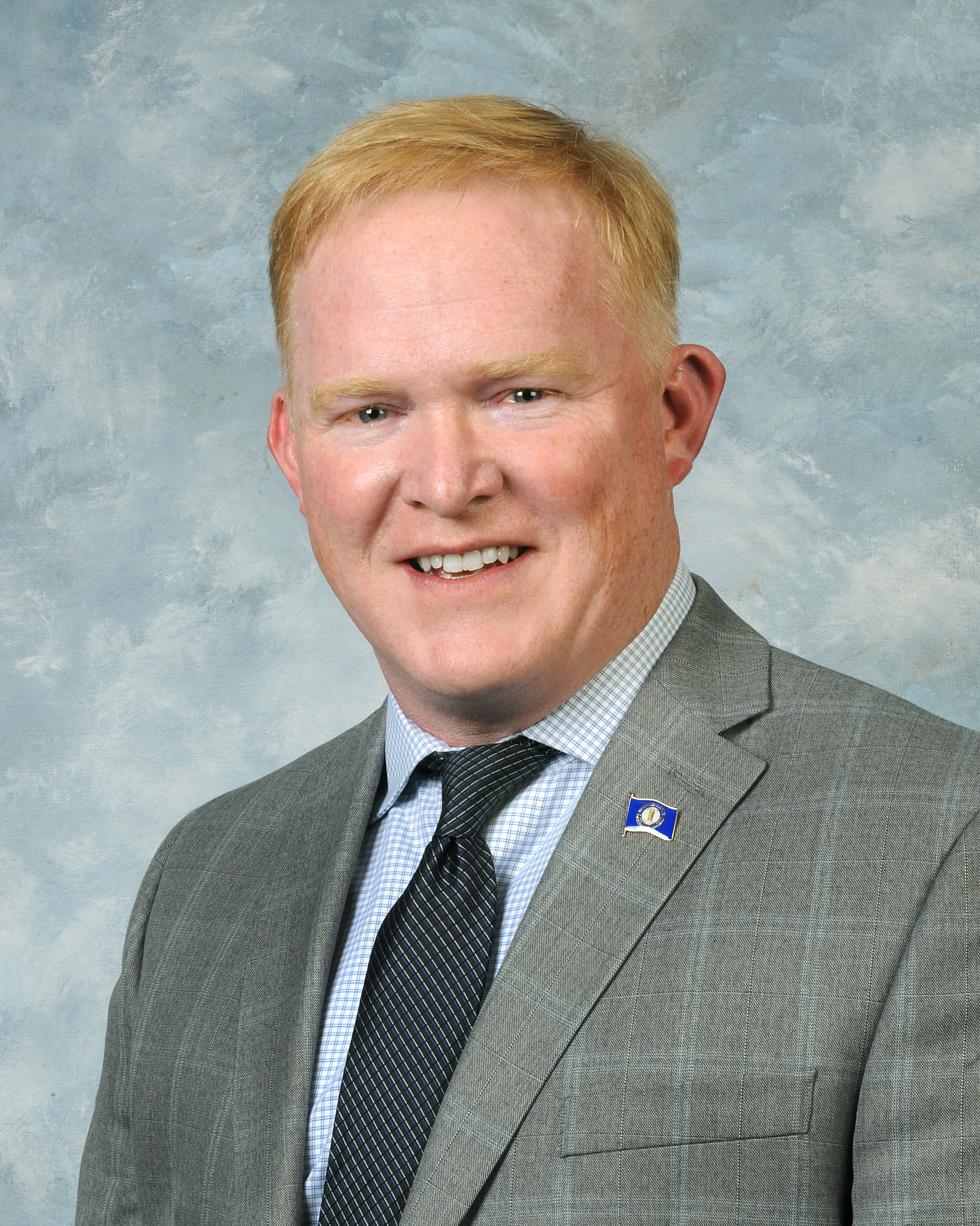

Member of the Kentucky House of Representatives from the 45th district
- In office January 1, 2021 – January 1, 2025
- Preceded by: Stan Lee
- Succeeded by: Adam Moore

Personal details
- Born: September 5, 1975 (age 50) Ithaca, New York, U.S.
- Party: Republican
- Education: University of Kentucky (BA, MA)
- Committees: Commission on Race & Access to Opportunity (Co-Chair); Budget Review Subcommittee on Postsecondary Education; Education; Licensing, Occupations, & Administrative Regulations; Tourism & Outdoor Recreation

Killian M. Timoney (born September 5, 1975) is an American politician, educator, and former Republican member of the Kentucky House of Representatives from Kentucky's 45th House district from 2021 to 2025. His district comprised parts of Fayette and Jessamine counties. Timoney was defeated in the 2024 Republican primary by challenger Thomas Jefferson, who lost the general election to Democratic candidate Adam Moore.

== Background ==
Timoney was born in Ithaca, New York, to first generation Irish immigrant parents. He graduated from Lexington Catholic High School before earning a Bachelor of Arts in history and Master of Arts in education from the University of Kentucky. While at UK, Timoney was a member of Pi Kappa Alpha.

From 1999 to 2012, Timoney worked for the Lexington-Fayette Urban County Government in the parks and recreation department.

In 1998, he began teaching social studies at Paul Laurence Dunbar High School and served as the school's assistant athletics director. He would go on to be an associate principal of Watterson Elementary School in Louisville, Kentucky, before returning Fayette County to be assistant principal of Winburn Middle School and later Director of Plant Operations.

Currently, Timoney is employed by Fayette County Public Schools as a special project coordinator.

== Political career ==
=== Elections ===
- 2020 Incumbent Republican Stan Lee withdrew from the race, and left Timoney unopposed in the 2020 Republican primary. Timoney won the 2020 Kentucky House of Representatives election with 14,236 votes (51.1%) against Democratic candidate Shirley Mitchell.
- 2022 Timoney was unopposed in both the 2022 Republican primary and the 2022 Kentucky House of Representatives election, winning with 13,061 votes.
- 2024 Timoney was defeated in the 2024 Republican primary, having garnered only 1,072 votes (27.9%) against challenger Thomas Jefferson.
