= Dottie Priddy =

American politician (1933–2008)

Member of the Kentucky House of Representatives from the 45th district
- In office January 1, 1970 – January 1, 1991
- Preceded by: Joseph H. Melton
- Succeeded by: Jerry Toby

Personal details
- Born: January 9, 1933
- Died: June 30, 2008 (aged 75)
- Party: Democratic

Dorothy Jean Priddy (January 9, 1933 – June 30, 2008) was an American politician from Kentucky who was a member of the Kentucky House of Representatives from 1970 to 1991. Priddy was first elected to the house in 1969, defeating incumbent Republican representative Joseph H. Melton. She was defeated for reelection in 1990 by Jerry Toby.

She died in June 2008 at age 75.
