= Kentucky's 45th House of Representatives district =

American legislative district

Kentucky's 45th State House of Representatives district
Representative
Adam Moore; D–Lexington
since January 1, 2025
- Registration: 45.5% Republican; 41.3% Democratic; 12.6% No party preference
- Demographics: 80.0% White; 2.5% Black; 5.0% Hispanic; 8.5% Asian; 0.2% Other; 3.8% Multiracial
- Population (2024): 43,883
- Registered voters (2026): 35,504

Kentucky's 45th House of Representatives district is one of 100 districts in the Kentucky House of Representatives. Located in the greater Lexington area, it comprises parts of Fayette and Jessamine Counties. It has been represented by Adam Moore (D–Lexington) since 2025. As of 2024, the district had a population of 43,883.

== Voter registration ==
On January 1, 2026, the district had 35,504 registered voters, who were registered with the following parties.

Party	Registration	
Party	Voters	%
Republican	16,141	45.46
Democratic	14,669	41.32
Independent	2,555	7.20
Libertarian	160	0.45
Green	30	0.08
Constitution	15	0.04
Socialist Workers	11	0.03
Reform	2	0.01
"Other"	1,921	5.41
Total	35,504	100.00

== List of members representing the district ==
Member	Party	Years	Electoral history	District location
Dottie Priddy (Louisville)	Democratic	January 1, 1970 – January 1, 1991	Elected in 1969. Reelected in 1971. Reelected in 1973. Reelected in 1975. Reelected in 1977. Reelected in 1979. Reelected in 1981. Reelected in 1984. Reelected in 1986. Reelected in 1988. Lost reelection.	1964–1972; Jefferson County (part).
Dottie Priddy (Louisville)	Democratic	January 1, 1970 – January 1, 1991	Elected in 1969. Reelected in 1971. Reelected in 1973. Reelected in 1975. Reelected in 1977. Reelected in 1979. Reelected in 1981. Reelected in 1984. Reelected in 1986. Reelected in 1988. Lost reelection.	1972–1974; Jefferson County (part).
Dottie Priddy (Louisville)	Democratic	January 1, 1970 – January 1, 1991	Elected in 1969. Reelected in 1971. Reelected in 1973. Reelected in 1975. Reelected in 1977. Reelected in 1979. Reelected in 1981. Reelected in 1984. Reelected in 1986. Reelected in 1988. Lost reelection.	1974–1985; Jefferson County (part).
Dottie Priddy (Louisville)	Democratic	January 1, 1970 – January 1, 1991	Elected in 1969. Reelected in 1971. Reelected in 1973. Reelected in 1975. Reelected in 1977. Reelected in 1979. Reelected in 1981. Reelected in 1984. Reelected in 1986. Reelected in 1988. Lost reelection.	1985–1993; Jefferson County (part).
Jerry Toby (Louisville)	Republican	January 1, 1991 – January 1, 1993	Elected in 1990. Redistricted to the 29th district and lost reelection.	1985–1993; Jefferson County (part).
Stan Cave (Lexington)	Republican	January 1, 1993 – January 1, 2001	Elected in 1992. Reelected in 1994. Reelected in 1996. Reelected in 1998. Retired.	1993–1997; Fayette County (part).
Stan Cave (Lexington)	Republican	January 1, 1993 – January 1, 2001	Elected in 1992. Reelected in 1994. Reelected in 1996. Reelected in 1998. Retired.	1997–2003
Stan Lee (Lexington)	Republican	January 1, 2001 – January 1, 2021	Elected in 2000. Reelected in 2002. Reelected in 2004. Reelected in 2006. Reelected in 2008. Reelected in 2010. Reelected in 2012. Reelected in 2014. Reelected in 2016. Reelected in 2018. Retired.	1997–2003
Stan Lee (Lexington)	Republican	January 1, 2001 – January 1, 2021	Elected in 2000. Reelected in 2002. Reelected in 2004. Reelected in 2006. Reelected in 2008. Reelected in 2010. Reelected in 2012. Reelected in 2014. Reelected in 2016. Reelected in 2018. Retired.	2003–2015
Stan Lee (Lexington)	Republican	January 1, 2001 – January 1, 2021	Elected in 2000. Reelected in 2002. Reelected in 2004. Reelected in 2006. Reelected in 2008. Reelected in 2010. Reelected in 2012. Reelected in 2014. Reelected in 2016. Reelected in 2018. Retired.	2015–2023
Killian Timoney (Lexington)	Republican	January 1, 2021 – January 1, 2025	Elected in 2020. Reelected in 2022. Lost renomination.	2015–2023
Killian Timoney (Lexington)	Republican	January 1, 2021 – January 1, 2025	Elected in 2020. Reelected in 2022. Lost renomination.	2023–present
Adam Moore (Lexington)	Democratic	January 1, 2025 – present	Elected in 2024. Reelected in 2026.	2023–present
