= Adam Moore (politician) =

Kentucky politician

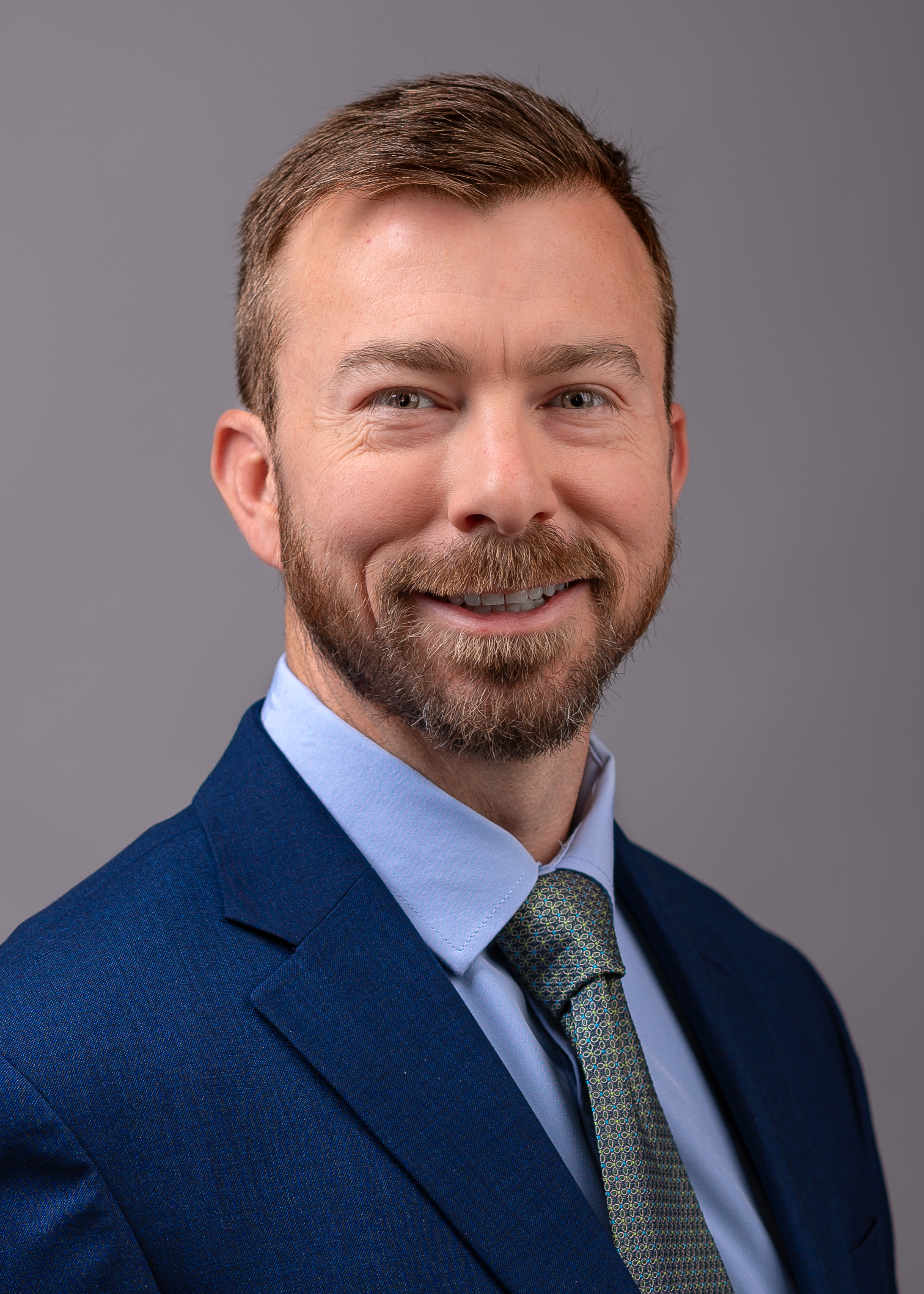
- Official portrait, 2025

Member of the Kentucky House of Representatives from the 45th district
- Incumbent
- Assumed office January 1, 2025
- Preceded by: Killian Timoney

Personal details
- Born: Adam Christopher Moore; November 30, 1984 (age 41) Frankfort, Kentucky, U.S.
- Party: Democratic
- Education: Murray State University (BA)

Adam Christopher Moore (born November 30, 1984) is an American politician who has served as a member of the Kentucky House of Representatives since January 2025. He represents the 45th district, which includes parts of Fayette and Jessamine Counties.

== Political career ==
Moore was elected in the 2024 Kentucky House of Representatives election. He received 50.3 percent of the vote, defeating Republican candidate Thomas Jefferson, who had defeated incumbent representative Killian Timoney in the primary election.

Moore was re-elected in the 2026 Kentucky House of Representatives election, receiving 54.2 percent of the vote against Timoney, who had chosen to run again in the district.

On November 18, 2026, Moore announced his candidacy in the 2027 Kentucky Secretary of State election.

== Electoral history ==
=== 2024 ===
2024 Kentucky's 45th House of Representatives district election
Party	Candidate	Votes	%
Democratic	Adam Moore	13,030	50.33
Republican	Thomas Jefferson	12,858	49.67
Total votes		25,888	100.0
Democratic gain from Republican			

=== 2026 ===
2026 Kentucky's 45th House of Representatives district election
Party	Candidate	Votes	%
Democratic	Adam Moore (incumbent)	11,185	54.19
Republican	Killian Timoney	9,455	45.81
Total votes		20,640	100.0
Democratic hold			
