= Kevin Jackson (politician) =

American politician

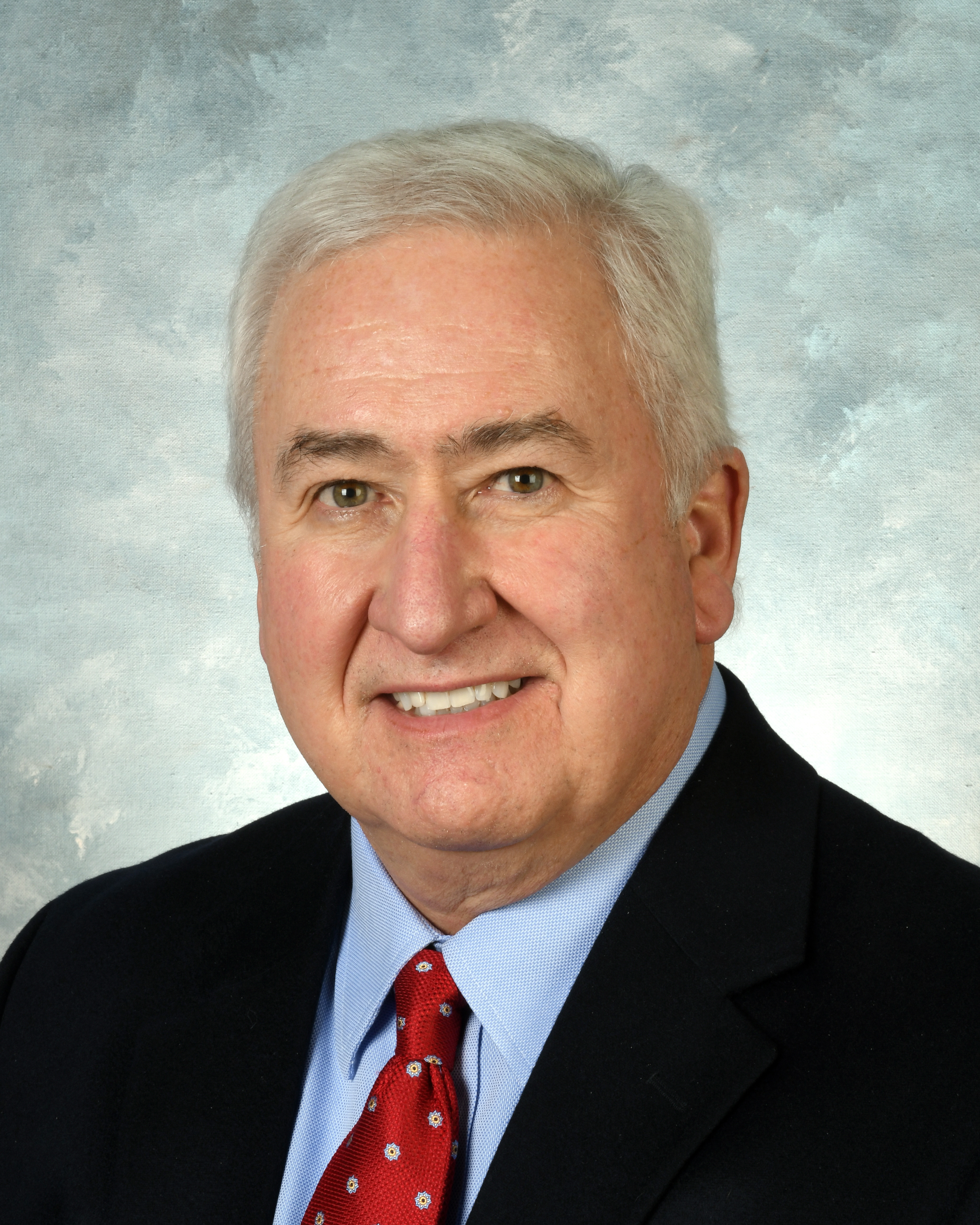

Member of the Kentucky House of Representatives from the 20th district
- Incumbent
- Assumed office January 1, 2023
- Preceded by: Patti Minter

Personal details
- Born: November 21, 1958 (age 67)
- Party: Republican
- Committees: Commission on Race and Access to Opportunity (co-chair); Economic Development & Workforce Investment; Primary and Secondary Education; Licensing, Occupations, & Administrative Regulations

Kevin Lynn Jackson (born November 21, 1958) is an American politician and Republican member of the Kentucky House of Representatives. He represents Kentucky's 20th House district, which includes parts of Bowling Green and Warren County.

== Background ==
Jackson received his Bachelor of Science, Master of Arts, and Rank I Certification from Western Kentucky University. He worked for 32 years in the Warren, Edmonson, and Barren County school systems as a teacher, guidance counselor, administrator, and coach before retiring. Since retiring from the education system, Jackson has been as a financial consultant for Studle Financial Services.

He is a former member of the Warren County Public School Board and BG-WC Community Education Board. He is also a member of the Bowling Green Area Chamber of Commerce.

== Political career ==
=== Elections ===
- 2022 Jackson won the 2022 Republican primary with 2,152 votes (85.7%) against opponent Leanette Lopez, and won the 2022 Kentucky House of Representatives election against Democratic incumbent Patti Minter, winning with 6,762 votes (54.5%).
- 2024 Jackson was unopposed in both the 2024 Republican primary and the 2024 Kentucky House of Representatives election, winning the latter with 12,103 votes.
