= Wes Pate (politician) =

American politician

Member-elect of the Kentucky House of Representatives from the 14th district
- Assuming office January 1, 2027
- Succeeding: Scott Lewis

Personal details
- Born: Hancock County, Kentucky
- Party: Republican

Wesley (Wes) Pate is an American politician who is the member-elect for the 14th district of the Kentucky House of Representatives. He was elected at the 2026 election. Pate was born and raised in Hancock County, Kentucky. He served eight years on the Lewisport City Council and has worked in health care in Owensboro for 16 years.
