= Mark Treesh =

American politician

Member of the Kentucky House of Representatives from the 14th district
- In office June 1993 – January 1, 2003
- Preceded by: Don Blandford
- Succeeded by: Tommy Thompson

Personal details
- Born: June 17, 1954 (age 72)
- Party: Republican

Mark A. Treesh (born June 17, 1954) is an American politician from Kentucky who was a member of the Kentucky House of Representatives from 1993 to 2003. Treesh was first elected in a June 1993 special election following the resignation of incumbent representative and speaker of the house Don Blandford. Treesh retired in 2002 to unsuccessfully run for the Kentucky Senate.
