= Ashley Tackett Laferty =

American politician

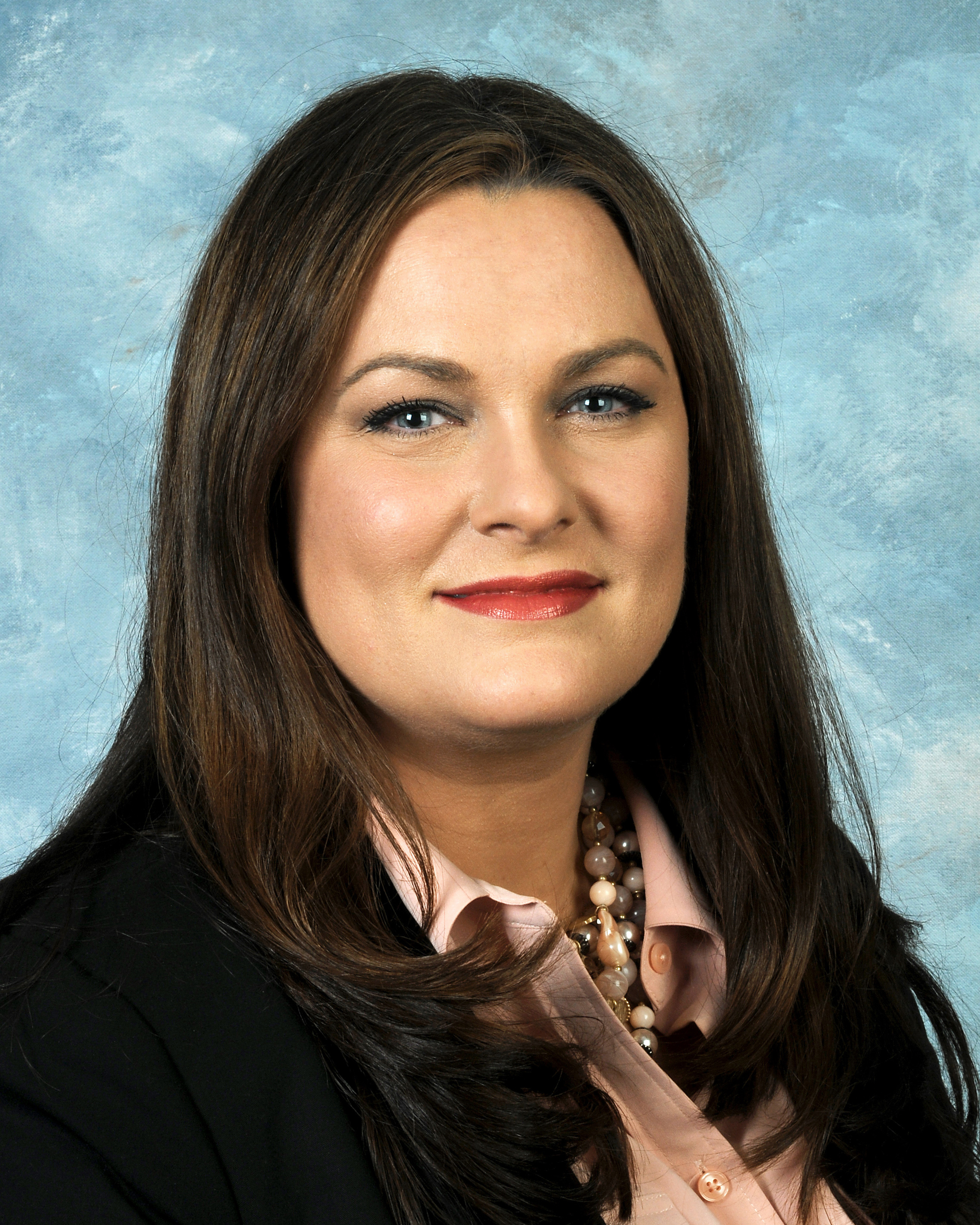

Member of the Kentucky House of Representatives from the 95th district
- Incumbent
- Assumed office January 1, 2019
- Preceded by: Larry D. Brown

Personal details
- Born: May 10, 1979 (age 47) Martin, Kentucky, U.S.
- Party: Democratic
- Education: Eastern Kentucky University (BA); University of Louisville (JD)

Ashley Nicole Tackett Laferty (born May 10, 1979) is an American attorney and politician serving as a member of the Kentucky House of Representatives from Kentucky's 95th House district. Elected in November 2018, she assumed office on January 1, 2019.

Tackett Laferty is considered to be a conservative Southern Democrat, and is the last Democrat representing the Eastern Kentucky Coalfield in the Kentucky General Assembly. Tackett Laferty did not for reelection to the house in 2026, instead running unsuccessfully to be a district judge of Kentucky's 31st judicial district.

== Early life and education ==
Tackett Laferty was born in Martin, Kentucky. She earned a Bachelor of Arts degree from Eastern Kentucky University and a Juris Doctor from the University of Louisville School of Law.

== Career ==
Since graduating from law school, Tackett Laferty has worked as an attorney. In 2014, she unsuccessfully ran to be a circuit judge of Kentucky's 31st judicial circuit.

She was elected to the Kentucky House of Representatives in November 2018, defeating incumbent Republican Larry D. Brown. She assumed office on January 1, 2019. She was re-elected in 2020 with 60% of the vote, beating Republican challenger William Matt Reynolds and was re-elected in 2022 with 60% of the vote, defeating Republican Brandon Spencer. She once again defeated Spencer in 2024.

== Policy positions ==
=== Diversity, equity and inclusion ===
In 2025, Tackett Laferty was the lone House Democrat to vote for a bill eliminating diversity, equity, and inclusion initiatives at public universities.

=== Homelessness ===
Tackett Laferty was the sole House Democrat to vote for the Safer Kentucky Act, which criminalized homelessness by banning "street camping" on public streets and under bridges.

=== Transgender youth in sports ===
Tackett Laferty opposes allowing transgender people to compete in sports that do not align with their biological sex. In 2022, she called for "little girls to play sports with little girls and little boys to play sports with little boys."

== Electoral history ==
=== 2014 ===
2014 31st Kentucky Circuit Court, 2nd division primary election
Party	Candidate	Votes	%
Nonpartisan	Ashley Tackett Laferty	4,643	31.6
Nonpartisan	Thomas M. Smith	4,157	28.3
Nonpartisan	David Allen Barber	1,966	13.4
Nonpartisan	C. V. Reynolds	1,924	13.1
Nonpartisan	Earl "Mickey" McGuire	1,323	9.0
Nonpartisan	J. Sam Doyle	692	4.7
Total votes		14,705	100.0

2014 31st Kentucky Circuit Court, 2nd division election
Party	Candidate	Votes	%
Nonpartisan	Thomas M. Smith	6,435	50.3
Nonpartisan	Ashley Tackett Laferty	6,363	49.7
Total votes		12,798	100.0

=== 2018 ===
2018 Kentucky House of Representatives 95th district election
Party	Candidate	Votes	%
Democratic	Ashley Tackett Laferty	8,154	57.7
Republican	Larry D. Brown (incumbent)	5,974	42.3
Total votes		14,128	100.0
Democratic gain from Republican			

=== 2020 ===
2020 Kentucky House of Representatives 95th district election
Party	Candidate	Votes	%
Democratic	Ashley Tackett Laferty (incumbent)	10,720	60.0
Republican	William Matt Reynolds	7,149	40.0
Total votes		17,869	100.0
Democratic hold			

=== 2022 ===
2022 Kentucky House of Representatives 95th district election
Party	Candidate	Votes	%
Democratic	Ashley Tackett Laferty (incumbent)	8,775	59.8
Republican	Brandon Spencer	5,890	40.2
Total votes		14,665	100.0
Democratic hold			

=== 2024 ===
2024 Kentucky House of Representatives 95th district election
Party	Candidate	Votes	%
Democratic	Ashley Tackett Laferty (incumbent)	10,721	56.3
Republican	Brandon Spencer	8,330	43.7
Total votes		19,051	100.0
Democratic hold			
