= Daniel Elliott (Kentucky politician) =

American politician (born 1984)

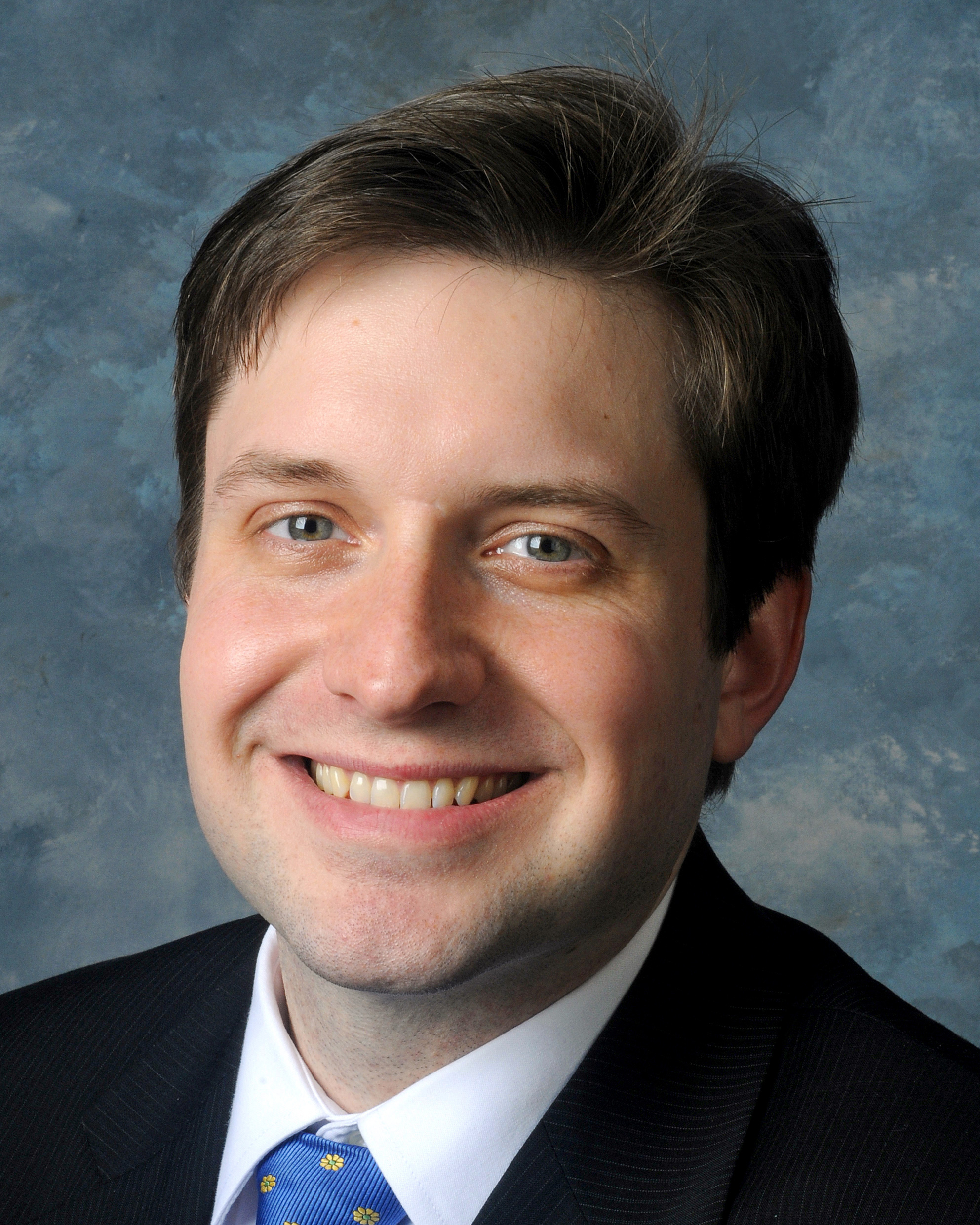

Member of the Kentucky House of Representatives from the 54th district
- Incumbent
- Assumed office March 15, 2016
- Preceded by: Mike Harmon

Personal details
- Born: August 12, 1984 (age 42) Danville, Kentucky, U.S.
- Party: Republican
- Education: Bellarmine University (BA); University of Louisville (JD)
- Committees: Judiciary (Chair); Economic Development & Workforce Investment; Families & Children; Transportation

Daniel B. Elliott (born August 12, 1984) is an American attorney and politician serving as a Republican member of the Kentucky House of Representatives from Kentucky's 54th House district since March 2016. He currently serves as chair of the House Standing Committee on Judiciary.

== Background ==
Elliott was born in Danville, Kentucky and attended Boyle County High School. He earned a Bachelor of Arts in political science from Bellarmine University in 2007, graduating magna cum laude and Omicron Delta Kappa, and a Juris Doctor from the University of Louisville School of Law. While at Bellarmine, he was a member of Phi Sigma Tau honor society and interned in the Washington D.C. office of Senator Jim Bunning.

Since graduating from law school, Elliot has worked as an attorney. He also serves as a member of the Perryville Battlefield Commission, Lake Cumberland Area Development Board of Directors, and Council of State Governments Intergovernmental Affairs Commission.

== Political career ==
=== Elections ===
- 2016 (Special) Governor Matt Bevin called for a special election to be held on March 8, 2016, following incumbent representative Mike Harmon assuming the office of Kentucky Auditor of Public Accounts. Elliot won the 2016 Kentucky House of Representatives special election with 4,275 votes (58.4%) against Democratic candidate Bill Noelker.
- 2016 Elliot won the 2016 Republican primary with 2,395 votes (80.9%) and won the 2016 Kentucky House of Representatives election with 12,607 votes (66.8%) against Democratic candidate Bill Noelker.
- 2018 Elliot was unopposed in the 2018 Republican primary and won the 2018 Kentucky House of Representatives election with 10,360 votes (77.3%) against write-in candidate Lydia Coffey.
- 2020 Elliot was unopposed in the 2020 Republican primary and won the 2020 Kentucky House of Representatives election with 14,144 votes (66.5%) against Democratic candidate Lydia Coffey.
- 2022 Elliot was unopposed in the 2022 Republican primary and won the 2022 Kentucky House of Representatives election with 11,109 votes (72.4%) against Democratic candidate Elaine Wilson-Reddy.
- 2024 Elliot was unopposed in both the 2024 Republican primary and the 2024 Kentucky House of Representatives election, winning the latter with 16,970 votes.
