= Jerry Toby =

American politician (born 1963)

Member of the Kentucky House of Representatives from the 45th district
- In office January 1, 1991 – January 1, 1993
- Preceded by: Dottie Priddy
- Succeeded by: Stan Cave (redistricting)

Personal details
- Born: December 1, 1963 (age 62)
- Party: Republican

Jerry Michael Toby (born December 1, 1963) is an American politician from Kentucky who was a member of the Kentucky House of Representatives from 1991 to 1993. Toby was elected to the house in 1990, defeating incumbent Democratic representative Dottie Priddy. In 1992 redistricting moved the 45th district from Louisville to Lexington, moving Toby to the 29th district. He ran for the 29th district, losing to Democratic candidate Dave Stengel.
