= Larry D. Brown =

American politician

Member of the Kentucky House of Representatives from the 95th district
- In office January 1, 2017 – January 1, 2019
- Preceded by: Greg Stumbo
- Succeeded by: Ashley Tackett Laferty

Personal details
- Party: Republican

Larry D. Brown is a Kentucky politician who represented the 95th district in the Kentucky House of Representatives from 2017 to 2019.

In the November 2016 general election, Brown defeated incumbent Democrat Greg Stumbo to become a Member of the Kentucky House of Representatives representing the 95th district. He was defeated by Democrat Ashley Tackett Laferty in the 2018 general election.

In December 2018, Brown was named a field commissioner for the Department for Local Government.
