= List of speakers of the Kentucky House of Representatives =

Speaker of Kentucky House of Representatives
- Seal of the Commonwealth of Kentucky

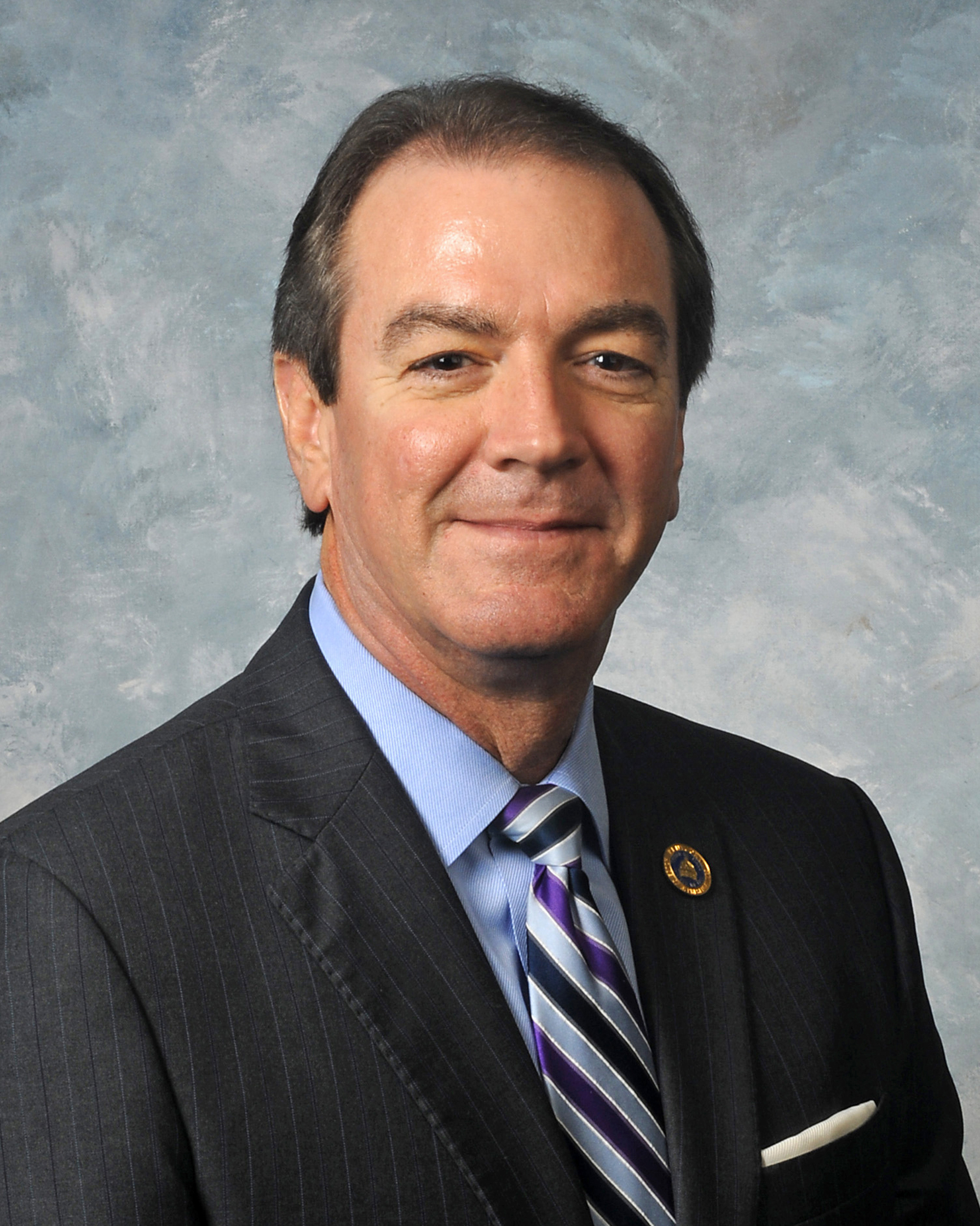
- Incumbent; David W. Osborne since January 8, 2019
- Status: Presiding officer
- Seat: Kentucky State Capitol, Frankfort
- Appointer: Kentucky House of Representatives
- Inaugural holder: Robert Breckinridge

The following is a list of speakers of the Kentucky House of Representatives since statehood.

== Speakers of the Kentucky House of Representatives ==
No.	Image	Speaker	Term	Party	County/Residence	Citation
1		Robert Breckinridge	1792–1796	Democratic-Republican		
2		Edmund Bullock	1796–1799	Democratic-Republican		
3		John Breckinridge	1799–1801	Democratic-Republican		
4		John Adair	1801–1803	Democratic-Republican		
5		William Logan	1803–1807	Democratic-Republican		
6		Henry Clay	1807–1808	Democratic-Republican		
7		William Logan	1808–1810	Democratic-Republican		
8		John Simpson	1810–1812	Democratic-Republican		
9		Joseph H. Hawkins	1812–1814	Democratic-Republican		
10		William T. Barry	1814–1815	Democratic-Republican		
11		John J. Crittenden	1815–1817	Democratic-Republican	Logan County	
12		Cabell Breckinridge	1817–1819	Democratic-Republican	Fayette County	
13		Martin D. Hardin	1819–1820	Democratic-Republican	Madison County	
14		George Claiborne Thompson	1820–1822		Mercer County	
15		Richard C. Anderson Jr.	1822–1823		Jefferson County	
16		George Robertson	1823–1824	Democratic-Republican	Fayette County	
17		Robert J. Ward	1824–1825		Scott County	
18		George Robertson	1825–1827	Democratic-Republican	Fayette County	
19		John Speed Smith	1827–1828	Democratic-Republican	Madison County	
20		Tunstall Quarles	1828–1829	Democratic-Republican	Pulaski County	
21		John J. Crittenden	1829–1833	Democratic-Republican	Franklin County	
22		Richard B. New	1833–1834		Trigg County	
23		Charles A. Wickliffe	1834–1835	Whig	Nelson County	
24		John L. Helm	1835–1837	Whig	Hardin County	
25		Robert P. Letcher	1837–1839	Whig	Garrard County	
26		John L. Helm	1839–1840	Whig	Hardin County	
27		Charles S. Morehead	1840–1842	Whig	Franklin County	
28		John L. Helm	1842–1844	Whig	Hardin County	
29		Charles S. Morehead	1844–1845	Whig	Franklin County	
30		Joseph R. Underwood	1845–1846	Whig	Warren County	
31		Leslie Combs	1846–1847	Whig	Fayette County	
32		James F. Buckner	1847–1848	Whig	Christian County	
33		Gwyn Page	1848–1849	Whig	Jeferson County	
34		Thomas W. Riley	1849–1850	Whig	Nelson County	
35		G. W. Johnston	1850–1851	Whig	Shelby County	
36		George Robertson	1851–1853	Whig	Fayette County	
37		Charles G. Wintersmith	1853–1855	Whig	Hardin County	
38		John B. Huston	1855–1857	Know Nothing	Clark County	
39		Daniel P. White	1857–1859	Democratic	Green County	
40		David Meriwether	1859–1861	Democratic	Jefferson County	
41		Richard A. Buckner	1861–1863	Unionist	Fayette County	
42		Harrison Taylor	1863–1867	Democratic	Mason County	
43		John T. Bunch	1867–1871		Louisville	
44		James B. McCreary	1871–1874	Democratic	Madison County	
45		William Johnson Stone	1875–1876	Democratic	Lyon County	
46		Ed W. Turner	1877–1878	Democratic	Madison County	
47		Joseph M. Bigger	1879–1880	Democratic	McCracken County	
48		William Claiborne Owens	1881–1882	Democratic	Scott County	
49		Charles Offutt	1883–1886	Democratic	Bourbon County	
50		Ben Johnson	1887–1888	Democratic	Nelson County	
51		Harvey Myers	1889–1890	Democratic	Kenton County	
52		William M. Moore	1891–1894	Democratic	Harrison County	
53		A. J. Carroll	1894–1896	Democratic	Jefferson County	
54		Charles J. Blandford	1896–1898	Republican	Breckinridge County	
55		J. C. W. Beckham	1898–1900	Democratic	Nelson County	
56		South Trimble	1900–1902	Democratic	Franklin County	
57		Gerald T. Finn	1902–1904	Democratic	Simpson County	
58		Eli H. Brown	1904–1906	Democratic	Daviess County	
59		Henry R. Lawrence	1906–1908	Democratic	Trigg County	
60		William J. Gooch	1908–1910	Democratic	Simpson County	
61		George S. Wilson	1910–1912	Democratic	Union County	
62		Claude B. Terrell	1912–1916	Democratic	Trimble County	
63		Hugh C. Duffy	1916–1918	Democratic	Harrison County	
64		Robert C. Crowe	1918–1920	Democratic	Oldham County	
65		Joseph Bosworth	1920–1922	Republican	Bell County	
66		James H. Thompson	1922–1924	Democratic	Bourbon County	
67		Samuel W. Adams	1924–1926	Democratic	Kenton County	
68		George L. Drury	1926–1928	Democratic	Union County	
69		John S. Milliken	1928–1932	Democratic	Simpson County	
70		John Y. Brown	1932–1933	Democratic	Fayette County	
71		Frank Lebus	1933–1934	Democratic	Harrison County	
72		W. E. Rogers	1934–1935	Democratic	Todd County	
73		Wallace Brown	1935–1936	Democratic	Nelson County	
74		John D. Kirtley	1936–1940	Democratic	McLean County	
75		Benjamin F. Shields	1940–1942	Democratic	Shelby County	
76		Stanley S. Dickson	1942–1944	Democratic	Bourbon County	
77		Harry Waterfield	1944–1948	Democratic	Hickman County	
78		Herbert Tinsley	1948–1950	Democratic	Carroll County	
79		Adron Doran	1950–1952	Democratic	Calloway County	
80		Charles W. Burnley	1952–1956	Democratic	McCracken County	
81		Thomas P. Fitzpatrick	1956–1958	Democratic	Kenton County	
82		Morris Weintraub	1958–1960	Democratic	Campbell County	
83		Harry Lowman	1960–1964	Democratic	Boyd County	
84		Shelby McCallum	1964–1968	Democratic	Marshall County	
85		Julian Carroll	1968–1971	Democratic	McCracken County	
86		Norbert Blume	1972–1976	Democratic	Jefferson County	
87		William G. Kenton	1976–1981	Democratic	Fayette County	
88		Bobby H. Richardson	1982–1985	Democratic	Barren County	
89		Donald Blandford	1985–1993	Democratic	Daviess County	
90		Joe Clarke	1993–1995	Democratic	Boyle County	
91		Jody Richards	1995–2009	Democratic	Warren County	
92		Greg Stumbo	2009–2017	Democratic	Floyd County	
93		Jeff Hoover	2017–2018	Republican	Russell County	
94		David Osborne	2018–	Republican	Oldham County	

== See also ==
- List of Kentucky General Assemblies
