= Don Blandford =

American politician

89th Speaker of the Kentucky House of Representatives
- In office January 8, 1985 – January 6, 1993
- Preceded by: Bobby H. Richardson
- Succeeded by: Joe Clarke

Speaker pro tempore of the Kentucky House of Representatives
- In office January 4, 1983 – January 8, 1985
- Preceded by: David Thomason
- Succeeded by: Pete Worthington

Member of the Kentucky House of Representatives from the 14th district
- In office January 1, 1968 – May 3, 1993
- Preceded by: R. E. Hale
- Succeeded by: Mark Treesh

Personal details
- Born: Donald Joseph Blandford; April 4, 1938 (age 88) Owensboro, Kentucky, U.S.
- Party: Democratic

Donald Joseph Blandford (born April 4, 1938) is an American retired politician in the state of Kentucky. A Democrat, he was a longtime Kentucky state representative and served as Speaker of the Kentucky House of Representatives until his indictment and conviction for bribery.

Born in Owensboro, Kentucky in 1938, Blandford was a meat cutter (butcher) who lived in Philpot, Kentucky, and represented the 14th District in the Kentucky House of Representatives from 1968 to 1993. In January 1985 Blandford unseated Speaker of the House Bobby H. Richardson to assume that office himself.

Blandford served as Speaker of the House for eight years, which was the longest tenure in that position up to that time. In 1990, he managed the passage of major education reform legislation and maintained significant administrative control over the legislative process.

== Operation Boptrot ==
During the 1992 legislative session the Federal Bureau of Investigation conducted an inquiry and sting operations involving members of the Kentucky House of Representatives and the Kentucky Senate, known as Operation Boptrot. Approximately 10% of the state's sitting legislators were indicted as a result, many for accepting bribes of as low as $100. The probe snared members of both political parties. Blandford was the highest ranking legislator indicted. (The Republican minority leader in the Senate was also indicted and convicted, as were other House members of both parties.) Blandford accepted $500 in cash from former state representative Bill McBee, a lobbyist then representing a Kentucky racetrack. "Bless your heart", Blandford said when presented with the bribe. The exchange was videotaped and audiotaped by the FBI. Blandford was charged with bribery, and convicted and sent to prison. (The FBI investigation resulted in 21 convictions overall; most or all of those convicted were sitting legislators, former legislators, or lobbyists.) Blandford resigned his seat in 1993.

In the wake of Blandford's conviction and the scandal that rocked the Kentucky General Assembly as a whole, the House elected Joe Clarke of Danville, the longtime chairman of the Appropriations and Revenue Committee, as Speaker. Clarke's impeccably clean image and sterling reputation for honesty was a marked contrast to that of his predecessor.
