= John Bowling (politician) =

American politician

Member of the Kentucky House of Representatives from the 54th district
- In office January 1, 1999 – January 1, 2003
- Preceded by: Joe Clarke
- Succeeded by: Mike Harmon

Personal details
- Born: November 8, 1938 (age 87)
- Party: Democratic

John William Bowling (born November 8, 1938) is an American politician from Kentucky who was a member of the Kentucky House of Representatives from 1999 to 2003. Bowling was first elected in 1998 after incumbent representative and former speaker Joe Clarke retired. He did not seek reelection to the house in 2002, instead being elected mayor of Danville. He later served as city manager until his resignation in 2011, citing a death threat from a public employee.
