= Joseph Clarke (Kentucky politician) =

American politician

Joe Clarke

90th Speaker of the Kentucky House of Representatives
- In office January 6, 1993 – January 4, 1995
- Preceded by: Don Blandford
- Succeeded by: Jody Richards

Member of the Kentucky House of Representatives
- In office January 1, 1970 – January 1, 1999
- Preceded by: Howard Hunt
- Succeeded by: John Bowling
- Constituency: 50th district (1970–1972); 54th district (1972–1999)

Personal details
- Born: March 12, 1933 Boyle County, Kentucky, U.S.
- Died: September 21, 2003 (aged 70) Danville, Kentucky, U.S.
- Party: Democratic

P. Joseph Clarke Jr. (March 12, 1933 – September 21, 2003) was an American politician in the state of Kentucky. He served in the Kentucky House of Representatives as a Democrat from 1970 to 1999 and as its speaker from 1993 to 1995. Clarke died by suicide in 2003, aged 70.

Kentucky House of Representatives
Preceded by Howard Hunt	Member of the Kentucky House of Representatives from the 50th district 1970–1972	Succeeded by Joseph Bernard Keene
Preceded by Bart N. Peak	Member of the Kentucky House of Representatives from the 54th district 1972–1999	Succeeded by John Bowling
