= 2004 Kentucky House of Representatives election =

- November 2, 2004

All 100 seats in the Kentucky House of Representatives 51 seats needed for a majority
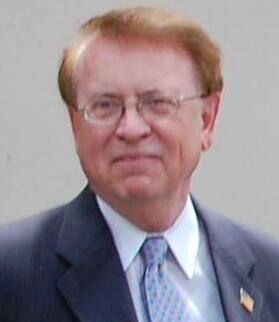

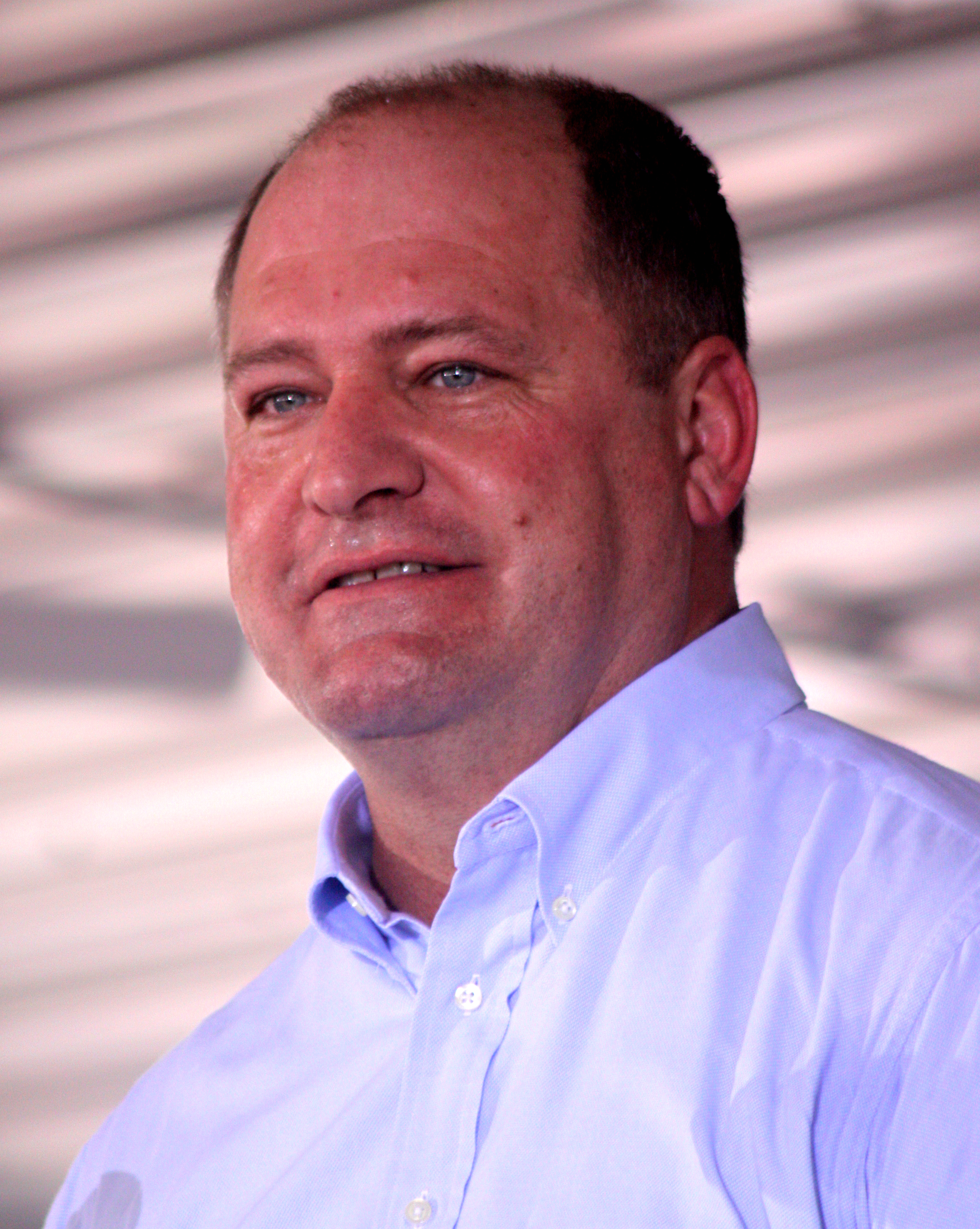
	Majority party	Minority party
Leader	Jody Richards	Jeff Hoover
Party	Democratic	Republican
Leader's seat	20th	83rd
Last election	65	35
Seats before	64	36 (Note: Thomas Kerr of the 64th district switched his party affiliation from Democratic to Republican in October 2003.)
Seats won	57	43
Seat change	▼7	▲7
Popular vote	736,877	747,292
Percentage	49.65%	50.35%
- Republican hold Republican gain Democratic hold 50–60% 60–70% 70–80% 80–90% >90% 50–60% 60–70% 70–80% >90%
Speaker before election
Jody Richards
Democratic
Elected Speaker
Jody Richards
Democratic

The 2004 Kentucky House of Representatives elections were held on November 2, 2004, as part of the biennial United States elections. All 100 of Kentucky's state representatives were up for reelection. In Kentucky, members of the House of Representatives serve two-year terms. Accordingly, they are up for reelection in both presidential and midterm election years.

Democrats held onto their majority in the House, which had been in democratic control since the 1921 elections. They continued to be the majority party in the House until the 2016 election. Despite keeping their majority, Democrats lost seven seats to Republicans in the Jackson Purchase and Pennyroyal regions.

== Closest races ==
Seats where the margin of victory was under 10%:

1. District 21, 1.04% gain
2. District 76, 1.13%
3. District 8, 1.42%
4. District 55, 1.90% gain
5. District 6, 2.85%
6. District 5, 3.88% gain
7. District 94, 5.02%
8. District 19, 5.22% gain
9. District 26, 5.53%
10. District 46, 5.75%
11. District 73, 5.92%
12. District 28, 6.86%
13. District 7, 7.95%
14. District 56, 8.00%
15. District 50, 8.02% gain
16. District 62, 8.13%
17. District 1, 9.20% gain
18. District 16, 9.38%
19. District 96, 9.69%

== Predictions ==
Source	Ranking	As of
Rothenberg	Likely D	October 1, 2004

== Election results ==
All results are official and certified by the Kentucky State Board of Elections.

=== District 1 ===
2004 Kentucky's 1st House of Representatives district election
Party	Candidate	Votes	%
Republican	Steven J. Rudy	9,749	54.60%
Democratic	Charles Geveden	8,107	45.40%
Total votes		17,856	100%
Republican gain from Democratic			

=== District 2 ===
2004 Kentucky's 2nd House of Representatives district election
Party	Candidate	Votes	%
Democratic	Fred Nesler	11,231	62.95%
Republican	George "Buddy" Petty Jr.	6,611	37.05%
Total votes		17,842	100%
Democratic hold			

=== District 3 ===
2004 Kentucky's 3rd House of Representatives district election
Party	Candidate	Votes	%
Democratic	Frank Rasche	9,871	100%
Total votes		9,871	100%
Democratic hold			

=== District 4 ===
2004 Kentucky's 4th House of Representatives district election
Party	Candidate	Votes	%
Democratic	Mike Cherry	10,960	60.85%
Republican	Fred Stubblefield	7,051	39.15%
Total votes		18,011	100%
Democratic hold			

=== District 5 ===
2004 Kentucky's 5th House of Representatives district election
Party	Candidate	Votes	%
Republican	Melvin B. Henley	8,745	51.94%
Democratic	Robert "Buddy" Buckingham	8,092	48.06%
Total votes		16,837	100%
Republican gain from Democratic			

=== District 6 ===
2004 Kentucky's 6th House of Representatives district election
Party	Candidate	Votes	%
Democratic	J.R. Gray	10,306	51.42%
Republican	Marvin Wilson	9,735	48.58%
Total votes		20,041	100%
Democratic hold			

=== District 7 ===
2004 Kentucky's 7th House of Representatives district election
Party	Candidate	Votes	%
Democratic	John A. Arnold Jr.	8,069	53.98%
Republican	Alan C. Taylor	6,880	46.02%
Total votes		14,949	100%
Democratic hold			

=== District 8 ===
2004 Kentucky's 8th House of Representatives district election
Party	Candidate	Votes	%
Democratic	James R. Carr	7,118	50.71%
Republican	Tom C. Jones	6,918	49.29%
Total votes		14,036	100%
Democratic hold			

=== District 9 ===
2004 Kentucky's 9th House of Representatives district election
Party	Candidate	Votes	%
Democratic	James E. Bruce	4,465	100%
Total votes		4,465	100%
Democratic hold			

=== District 10 ===
2004 Kentucky's 10th House of Representatives district election
Party	Candidate	Votes	%
Democratic	Joseph E. "Eddie" Ballard	9,574	100%
Total votes		9,574	100%
Democratic hold			

=== District 11 ===
2004 Kentucky's 11th House of Representatives district election
Party	Candidate	Votes	%
Democratic	Gross Clay Lindsay	10,317	100%
Total votes		10,317	100%
Democratic hold			

=== District 12 ===
2004 Kentucky's 12th House of Representatives district election
Party	Candidate	Votes	%
Democratic	Jim Gooch Jr.	9,973	100%
Total votes		9,973	100%
Democratic hold			

=== District 13 ===
2004 Kentucky's 13th House of Representatives district election
Party	Candidate	Votes	%
Republican	Joe Bowen	9,233	57.07%
Democratic	Everett E. Thompson	6,944	42.93%
Total votes		16,177	100%
Republican hold			

=== District 14 ===
2004 Kentucky's 14th House of Representatives district election
Party	Candidate	Votes	%
Democratic	Tommy Thompson	11,015	55.93%
Republican	Steve Winkler	8,681	44.07%
Total votes		19,696	100%
Democratic hold			

=== District 15 ===
2004 Kentucky's 15th House of Representatives district election
Party	Candidate	Votes	%
Democratic	Brent Yonts	10,259	100%
Total votes		10,259	100%
Democratic hold			

=== District 16 ===
2004 Kentucky's 16th House of Representatives district election
Party	Candidate	Votes	%
Republican	Sheldon E. Baugh	8,029	54.69%
Democratic	Arthur W. Green	6,652	45.31%
Total votes		14,681	100%
Republican hold			

=== District 17 ===
2004 Kentucky's 17th House of Representatives district election
Party	Candidate	Votes	%
Republican	C.B. Embry Jr.	11,045	69.33%
Democratic	Larry D. Ashlock	4,886	30.67%
Total votes		15,931	100%
Republican hold			

=== District 18 ===
2004 Kentucky's 18th House of Representatives district election
Party	Candidate	Votes	%
Republican	Dwight D. Butler	12,092	69.34%
Democratic	Judy Blair	5,346	30.66%
Total votes		17,438	100%
Republican hold			

=== District 19 ===
2004 Kentucky's 19th House of Representatives district election
Party	Candidate	Votes	%
Republican	Terry Shelton	9,031	52.61%
Democratic	Dottie J. Sims	8,135	47.39%
Total votes		17,166	100%
Republican gain from Democratic			

=== District 20 ===
2004 Kentucky's 20th House of Representatives district election
Party	Candidate	Votes	%
Democratic	Jody Richards	10,398	100%
Total votes		10,398	100%
Democratic hold			

=== District 21 ===
2004 Kentucky's 21st House of Representatives district election
Party	Candidate	Votes	%
Republican	Jim DeCesare	8,954	50.52%
Democratic	Roger Thomas	8,769	49.48%
Total votes		17,723	100%
Republican gain from Democratic			

=== District 22 ===
2004 Kentucky's 22nd House of Representatives district election
Party	Candidate	Votes	%
Democratic	Rob Wilkey	9,957	57.97%
Republican	Adam Potter	7,218	42.03%
Total votes		17,175	100%
Democratic hold			

=== District 23 ===
2004 Kentucky's 23rd House of Representatives district election
Party	Candidate	Votes	%
Republican	Stephen R. Nunn	11,322	100%
Total votes		11,322	100%
Republican hold			

=== District 24 ===
2004 Kentucky's 24th House of Representatives district election
Party	Candidate	Votes	%
Republican	Jimmy Higdon	10,806	100%
Total votes		10,806	100%
Republican hold			

=== District 25 ===
2004 Kentucky's 25th House of Representatives district election
Party	Candidate	Votes	%
Democratic	Jimmie Lee	10,990	100%
Total votes		10,990	100%
Democratic hold			

=== District 26 ===
2004 Kentucky's 26th House of Representatives district election
Party	Candidate	Votes	%
Democratic	Mike Weaver	6,788	52.76%
Republican	Donna Broadway	6,077	47.24%
Total votes		12,865	100%
Democratic hold			

=== District 27 ===
2004 Kentucky's 27th House of Representatives district election
Party	Candidate	Votes	%
Republican	Gerry Lynn	7,664	55.10%
Democratic	James H. Thompson	6,246	44.90%
Total votes		13,910	100%
Republican gain from Democratic			

=== District 28 ===
2004 Kentucky's 28th House of Representatives district election
Party	Candidate	Votes	%
Democratic	Charles W. Miller	9,108	59.32%
Republican	Ron Gambrell	6,246	40.68%
Total votes		15,354	100%
Democratic hold			

=== District 29 ===
2004 Kentucky's 29th House of Representatives district election
Party	Candidate	Votes	%
Republican	Kevin D. Bratcher	15,407	62.77%
Democratic	Bruce W. Roberts	9,137	37.23%
Total votes		24,544	100%
Republican hold			

=== District 30 ===
2004 Kentucky's 30th House of Representatives district election
Party	Candidate	Votes	%
Democratic	Tom Burch	12,384	70.28%
Republican	David Newman	5,238	29.72%
Total votes		17,622	100%
Democratic hold			

=== District 31 ===
2004 Kentucky's 31st House of Representatives district election
Party	Candidate	Votes	%
Democratic	Steve Riggs	11,986	57.69%
Republican	Darroll L. Hawkins	8,790	42.31%
Total votes		20,776	100%
Democratic hold			

=== District 32 ===
2004 Kentucky's 32nd House of Representatives district election
Party	Candidate	Votes	%
Republican	Scott W. Brinkman	14,604	63.32%
Democratic	Geri G. Anderson	8,458	36.68%
Total votes		23,062	100%
Republican hold			

=== District 33 ===
2004 Kentucky's 33rd House of Representatives district election
Party	Candidate	Votes	%
Republican	Ron Crimm	17,876	70.01%
Democratic	Daniel E. Alley	7,656	29.99%
Total votes		25,532	100%
Republican hold			

=== District 34 ===
2004 Kentucky's 34th House of Representatives district election
Party	Candidate	Votes	%
Democratic	Mary Lou Marzian	16,383	66.12%
Republican	Philip C. Kimball	8,395	33.88%
Total votes		24,778	100%
Democratic hold			

=== District 35 ===
2004 Kentucky's 35th House of Representatives district election
Party	Candidate	Votes	%
Democratic	Jim Wayne	11,071	63.98%
Republican	Charles "Buddy" Bell	6,233	36.02%
Total votes		17,304	100%
Democratic hold			

=== District 36 ===
2004 Kentucky's 36th House of Representatives district election
Party	Candidate	Votes	%
Republican	Lonnie Napier	12,107	100%
Total votes		12,107	100%
Republican hold			

=== District 37 ===
2004 Kentucky's 37th House of Representatives district election
Party	Candidate	Votes	%
Democratic	Perry B. Clark	8,571	100%
Total votes		8,571	100%
Democratic hold			

=== District 38 ===
2004 Kentucky's 38th House of Representatives district election
Party	Candidate	Votes	%
Democratic	Denver Butler	8,508	58.83%
Republican	Paul Hosse	5,955	41.17%
Total votes		14,463	100%
Democratic hold			

=== District 39 ===
2004 Kentucky's 39th House of Representatives district election
Party	Candidate	Votes	%
Democratic	Robert R. Damron	10,231	58.24%
Republican	Christopher L. Stansbury	7,336	41.76%
Total votes		17,567	100%
Democratic hold			

=== District 40 ===
2004 Kentucky's 40th House of Representatives district election
Party	Candidate	Votes	%
Democratic	Dennis Horlander	10,632	100%
Total votes		10,632	100%
Democratic hold			

=== District 41 ===
2004 Kentucky's 41st House of Representatives district election
Party	Candidate	Votes	%
Democratic	Tom Riner	11,727	100%
Total votes		11,727	100%
Democratic hold			

=== District 42 ===
2004 Kentucky's 42nd House of Representatives district election
Party	Candidate	Votes	%
Democratic	Reginald K. Meeks	14,210	100%
Total votes		14,210	100%
Democratic hold			

=== District 43 ===
2004 Kentucky's 43rd House of Representatives district election
Party	Candidate	Votes	%
Democratic	Darryl T. Owens	9,691	62.54%
Republican	Mike Czerwonka	5,805	37.46%
Total votes		15,496	100%
Democratic hold			

=== District 44 ===
2004 Kentucky's 44th House of Representatives district election
Party	Candidate	Votes	%
Democratic	Joni Jenkins	12,782	100%
Total votes		12,782	100%
Democratic hold			

=== District 45 ===
2004 Kentucky's 45th House of Representatives district election
Party	Candidate	Votes	%
Republican	Stan Lee	16,490	66.39%
Democratic	Ralph Long	8,347	33.61%
Total votes		24,837	100%
Republican hold			

=== District 46 ===
2004 Kentucky's 46th House of Representatives district election
Party	Candidate	Votes	%
Democratic	Larry Clark	10,415	52.87%
Republican	Trace Chesser	9,283	47.13%
Total votes		19,698	100%
Democratic hold			

=== District 47 ===
2004 Kentucky's 47th House of Representatives district election
Party	Candidate	Votes	%
Democratic	Rick W. Rand	12,125	100%
Total votes		12,125	100%
Democratic hold			

=== District 48 ===
2004 Kentucky's 48th House of Representatives district election
Party	Candidate	Votes	%
Republican	Bob M. DeWeese	21,293	100%
Total votes		21,293	100%
Republican hold			

=== District 49 ===
2004 Kentucky's 49th House of Representatives district election
Party	Candidate	Votes	%
Republican	Mary C. Harper	10,434	55.93%
Democratic	Larry Belcher	8,222	44.07%
Total votes		18,656	100%
Republican hold			

=== District 50 ===
2004 Kentucky's 50th House of Representatives district election
Party	Candidate	Votes	%
Republican	David W. Floyd	9,952	54.01%
Democratic	Tommy Reed	8,474	45.99%
Total votes		18,426	100%
Republican gain from Democratic			

=== District 51 ===
2004 Kentucky's 51st House of Representatives district election
Party	Candidate	Votes	%
Republican	Russ Mobley	12,203	100%
Total votes		12,203	100%
Republican hold			

=== District 52 ===
2004 Kentucky's 52nd House of Representatives district election
Party	Candidate	Votes	%
Republican	Ken Upchurch	9,627	72.07%
Democratic	Sammy Whittenburg	3,730	27.93%
Total votes		13,357	100%
Republican hold			

=== District 53 ===
2004 Kentucky's 53rd House of Representatives district election
Party	Candidate	Votes	%
Republican	James R. Comer	12,247	100%
Total votes		12,247	100%
Republican hold			

=== District 54 ===
2004 Kentucky's 54th House of Representatives district election
Party	Candidate	Votes	%
Republican	Mike Harmon	9,459	56.28%
Democratic	David C. Sparrow	7,347	43.72%
Total votes		16,806	100%
Republican hold			

=== District 55 ===
2004 Kentucky's 55th House of Representatives district election
Party	Candidate	Votes	%
Republican	Milward Dedman	10,050	50.95%
Democratic	Sharon P. Clark	9,675	49.05%
Total votes		19,725	100%
Republican gain from Democratic			

=== District 56 ===
2004 Kentucky's 56th House of Representatives district election
Party	Candidate	Votes	%
Democratic	Joe Barrows	10,262	54.00%
Republican	Tony Moreno	8,741	46.00%
Total votes		19,003	100%
Democratic hold			

=== District 57 ===
2004 Kentucky's 57th House of Representatives district election
Party	Candidate	Votes	%
Democratic	Derrick W. Graham	14,432	100%
Total votes		14,432	100%
Democratic hold			

=== District 58 ===
2004 Kentucky's 58th House of Representatives district election
Party	Candidate	Votes	%
Republican	Brad Montell	11,503	55.33%
Democratic	David B. Eaton	9,287	44.67%
Total votes		20,790	100%
Republican hold			

=== District 59 ===
2004 Kentucky's 59th House of Representatives district election
Party	Candidate	Votes	%
Republican	Timothy E. Feeley	18,444	100%
Total votes		18,444	100%
Republican hold			

=== District 60 ===
2004 Kentucky's 60th House of Representatives district election
Party	Candidate	Votes	%
Republican	Paul H. Marcotte	17,253	100%
Total votes		17,253	100%
Republican hold			

=== District 61 ===
2004 Kentucky's 61st House of Representatives district election
Party	Candidate	Votes	%
Democratic	Royce W. Adams	9,112	58.33%
Republican	Pamela Ervin Mann	6,509	41.67%
Total votes		15,621	100%
Democratic hold			

=== District 62 ===
2004 Kentucky's 62nd House of Representatives district election
Party	Candidate	Votes	%
Democratic	Charlie Hoffman	10,010	54.07%
Republican	Charles O. Bradley	8,504	45.93%
Total votes		18,514	100%
Democratic hold			

=== District 63 ===
2004 Kentucky's 63rd House of Representatives district election
Party	Candidate	Votes	%
Republican	Jon E. Draud	17,035	100%
Total votes		17,035	100%
Republican hold			

=== District 64 ===
2004 Kentucky's 64th House of Representatives district election
Party	Candidate	Votes	%
Republican	Thomas Robert Kerr	14,032	100%
Total votes		14,032	100%
Republican hold			

=== District 65 ===
2004 Kentucky's 65th House of Representatives district election
Party	Candidate	Votes	%
Democratic	Arnold R. Simpson	7,739	100%
Total votes		7,739	100%
Democratic hold			

=== District 66 ===
2004 Kentucky's 66th House of Representatives district election
Party	Candidate	Votes	%
Republican	Addia Kathryn Wuchner	15,137	100%
Total votes		15,137	100%
Republican hold			

=== District 67 ===
2004 Kentucky's 67th House of Representatives district election
Party	Candidate	Votes	%
Democratic	Dennis Keene	6,665	51.41%
Republican	Mark T. Hayden	6,299	48.59%
Total votes		12,964	100%
Democratic hold			

=== District 68 ===
2004 Kentucky's 68th House of Representatives district election
Party	Candidate	Votes	%
Republican	Joseph M. Fischer	14,762	100%
Total votes		14,762	100%
Republican hold			

=== District 69 ===
2004 Kentucky's 69th House of Representatives district election
Party	Candidate	Votes	%
Republican	Jon David Reinhardt	12,038	100%
Total votes		12,038	100%
Republican hold			

=== District 70 ===
2004 Kentucky's 70th House of Representatives district election
Party	Candidate	Votes	%
Democratic	Mitchel B. "Mike" Denham	10,461	64.80%
Republican	Dale Jefferson	5,683	35.20%
Total votes		16,144	100%
Democratic hold			

=== District 71 ===
2004 Kentucky's 71st House of Representatives district election
Party	Candidate	Votes	%
Democratic	John Will Stacy	10,329	100%
Total votes		10,329	100%
Democratic hold			

=== District 72 ===
2004 Kentucky's 72nd House of Representatives district election
Party	Candidate	Votes	%
Democratic	Carolyn Belcher	8,902	55.38%
Republican	Bryan Beauman	7,172	44.62%
Total votes		16,074	100%
Democratic hold			

=== District 73 ===
2004 Kentucky's 73rd House of Representatives district election
Party	Candidate	Votes	%
Democratic	Don Pasley	9,360	52.96%
Republican	Ralph Alvarado	8,313	47.04%
Total votes		17,673	100%
Democratic hold			

=== District 74 ===
2004 Kentucky's 74th House of Representatives district election
Party	Candidate	Votes	%
Democratic	Adrian K. Arnold	10,598	100%
Total votes		10,598	100%
Democratic hold			

=== District 75 ===
2004 Kentucky's 75th House of Representatives district election
Party	Candidate	Votes	%
Democratic	Kathy W. Stein	10,404	100%
Total votes		10,404	100%
Democratic hold			

=== District 76 ===
2004 Kentucky's 76th House of Representatives district election
Party	Candidate	Votes	%
Democratic	Ruth Ann Palumbo	9,850	50.57%
Republican	John Hampton	9,629	49.43%
Total votes		19,479	100%
Democratic hold			

=== District 77 ===
2004 Kentucky's 77th House of Representatives district election
Party	Candidate	Votes	%
Democratic	Jesse Crenshaw	10,252	100%
Total votes		10,252	100%
Democratic hold			

=== District 78 ===
2004 Kentucky's 78th House of Representatives district election
Party	Candidate	Votes	%
Democratic	Thomas M. McKee	9,375	57.08%
Republican	Roger Sullivan	7,049	42.92%
Total votes		16,424	100%
Democratic hold			

=== District 79 ===
2004 Kentucky's 79th House of Representatives district election
Party	Candidate	Votes	%
Democratic	Susan Westrom	9,865	56.34%
Republican	Rick Christman	7,644	43.66%
Total votes		17,509	100%
Democratic hold			

=== District 80 ===
2004 Kentucky's 80th House of Representatives district election
Party	Candidate	Votes	%
Republican	Danny Ford	12,176	100%
Total votes		12,176	100%
Republican hold			

=== District 81 ===
2004 Kentucky's 81st House of Representatives district election
Party	Candidate	Votes	%
Democratic	Harry Moberly Jr.	8,853	56.43%
Republican	C. "Chuck" Luke	6,836	43.57%
Total votes		15,689	100%
Democratic hold			

=== District 82 ===
2004 Kentucky's 82nd House of Representatives district election
Party	Candidate	Votes	%
Republican	Charles L. Siler	11,284	100%
Total votes		11,284	100%
Republican hold			

=== District 83 ===
2004 Kentucky's 83rd House of Representatives district election
Party	Candidate	Votes	%
Republican	Jeff Hoover	13,762	100%
Total votes		13,762	100%
Republican hold			

=== District 84 ===
2004 Kentucky's 84th House of Representatives district election
Party	Candidate	Votes	%
Republican	Brandon D. Smith	9,388	100%
Total votes		9,388	100%
Republican hold			

=== District 85 ===
2004 Kentucky's 85th House of Representatives district election
Party	Candidate	Votes	%
Republican	Tommy Turner	13,292	100%
Total votes		13,292	100%
Republican hold			

=== District 86 ===
2004 Kentucky's 86th House of Representatives district election
Party	Candidate	Votes	%
Republican	Jim Stewart	12,164	100%
Total votes		12,164	100%
Republican hold			

=== District 87 ===
2004 Kentucky's 87th House of Representatives district election
Party	Candidate	Votes	%
Democratic	Rick Nelson	9,095	100%
Total votes		9,095	100%
Democratic hold			

=== District 88 ===
2004 Kentucky's 88th House of Representatives district election
Party	Candidate	Votes	%
Republican	Bill Farmer	13,776	67.17%
Democratic	Lamin P. Swann	6,732	32.83%
Total votes		20,508	100%
Republican hold			

=== District 89 ===
2004 Kentucky's 89th House of Representatives district election
Party	Candidate	Votes	%
Republican	Marie L. Rader	12,407	100%
Total votes		12,407	100%
Republican hold			

=== District 90 ===
2004 Kentucky's 90th House of Representatives district election
Party	Candidate	Votes	%
Republican	Tim Couch	9,751	100%
Total votes		9,751	100%
Republican hold			

=== District 91 ===
2004 Kentucky's 91st House of Representatives district election
Party	Candidate	Votes	%
Democratic	Ted "Teddy" Edmonds	9,129	100%
Total votes		9,129	100%
Democratic hold			

=== District 92 ===
2004 Kentucky's 92nd House of Representatives district election
Party	Candidate	Votes	%
Democratic	Ancel Smith	9,140	62.22%
Republican	Bill B. Bates	5,549	37.78%
Total votes		14,689	100%
Democratic hold			

=== District 93 ===
2004 Kentucky's 93rd House of Representatives district election
Party	Candidate	Votes	%
Democratic	W. Keith Hall	10,119	100%
Total votes		10,119	100%
Democratic hold			

=== District 94 ===
2004 Kentucky's 94th House of Representatives district election
Party	Candidate	Votes	%
Republican	Howard Cornett	7,721	52.51%
Democratic	G.C. Kincer	6,983	47.49%
Total votes		14,704	100%
Republican hold			

=== District 95 ===
2004 Kentucky's 95th House of Representatives district election
Party	Candidate	Votes	%
Democratic	Charles "Chuck" Meade	11,549	77.25%
Republican	Bobby Stumbo	3,401	22.75%
Total votes		14,950	100%
Democratic hold			

=== District 96 ===
2004 Kentucky's 96th House of Representatives district election
Party	Candidate	Votes	%
Democratic	Robin L. Webb	8,758	54.84%
Republican	Jimmy Lykins	7,211	45.16%
Total votes		15,969	100%
Democratic hold			

=== District 97 ===
2004 Kentucky's 97th House of Representatives district election
Party	Candidate	Votes	%
Democratic	Hubert Collins	11,433	100%
Total votes		11,433	100%
Democratic hold			

=== District 98 ===
2004 Kentucky's 98th House of Representatives district election
Party	Candidate	Votes	%
Democratic	Tanya Pullin	11,178	100%
Total votes		11,178	100%
Democratic hold			

=== District 99 ===
2004 Kentucky's 99th House of Representatives district election
Party	Candidate	Votes	%
Democratic	Rocky Adkins	11,667	100%
Total votes		11,667	100%
Democratic hold			

=== District 100 ===
2004 Kentucky's 100th House of Representatives district election
Party	Candidate	Votes	%
Republican	John Vincent	10,263	100%
Total votes		10,263	100%
Republican hold			
