= 2016 United States House of Representatives elections in Kentucky =

- November 8, 2016

All 6 Kentucky seats to the United States House of Representatives
	Majority party	Minority party
Party	Republican	Democratic
Last election	5	1
Seats won	5	1
Seat change	Steady	Steady
Popular vote	1,248,140	516,904
Percentage	70.70%	29.28%
Swing	▲7.12%	▼7.14%

Republican
50–60%
60–70%
70–80%
80–90%
90–100%
Democratic
60–70%

The 2016 United States House of Representatives elections in Kentucky were held on November 8, 2016, to elect the six U.S. representatives from the state of Kentucky, one from each of the state's six congressional districts. The elections coincided with the 2016 presidential election, as well as other elections to the House of Representatives, elections to the United States Senate and various state and local elections. The primaries were held on May 17.

== Overview ==
Popular vote
Republican	70.70%
Democratic	29.28%
Other	0.02%

House seats
Republican	83.33%
Democratic	16.67%

=== By district ===
Results of the 2018 United States House of Representatives elections in Kentucky by district:

District	Republican		Democratic		Others		Total		Result
District	Votes	%	Votes	%	Votes	%	Votes	%	Result
District 1	216,959	72.56%	81,710	27.33%	332	0.11%	299,001	100.0%	Republican hold
District 2	251,825	100.0%	0	0.00%	0	0.00%	251,825	100.0%	Republican hold
District 3	122,093	36.50%	212,401	63.50%	0	0.00%	334,494	100.0%	Democratic hold
District 4	233,922	71.32%	94,065	28.68%	0	0.00%	327,987	100.0%	Republican hold
District 5	221,242	100.0%	0	0.00%	0	0.00%	221,242	100.0%	Republican hold
District 6	202,099	61.09%	128,728	38.91%	0	0.00%	330,827	100.0%	Republican hold
Total	1,248,140	70.70%	516,904	29.28%	332	0.02%	1,765,376	100.0%	

== District 1 ==
2016 Kentucky's 1st congressional district elections
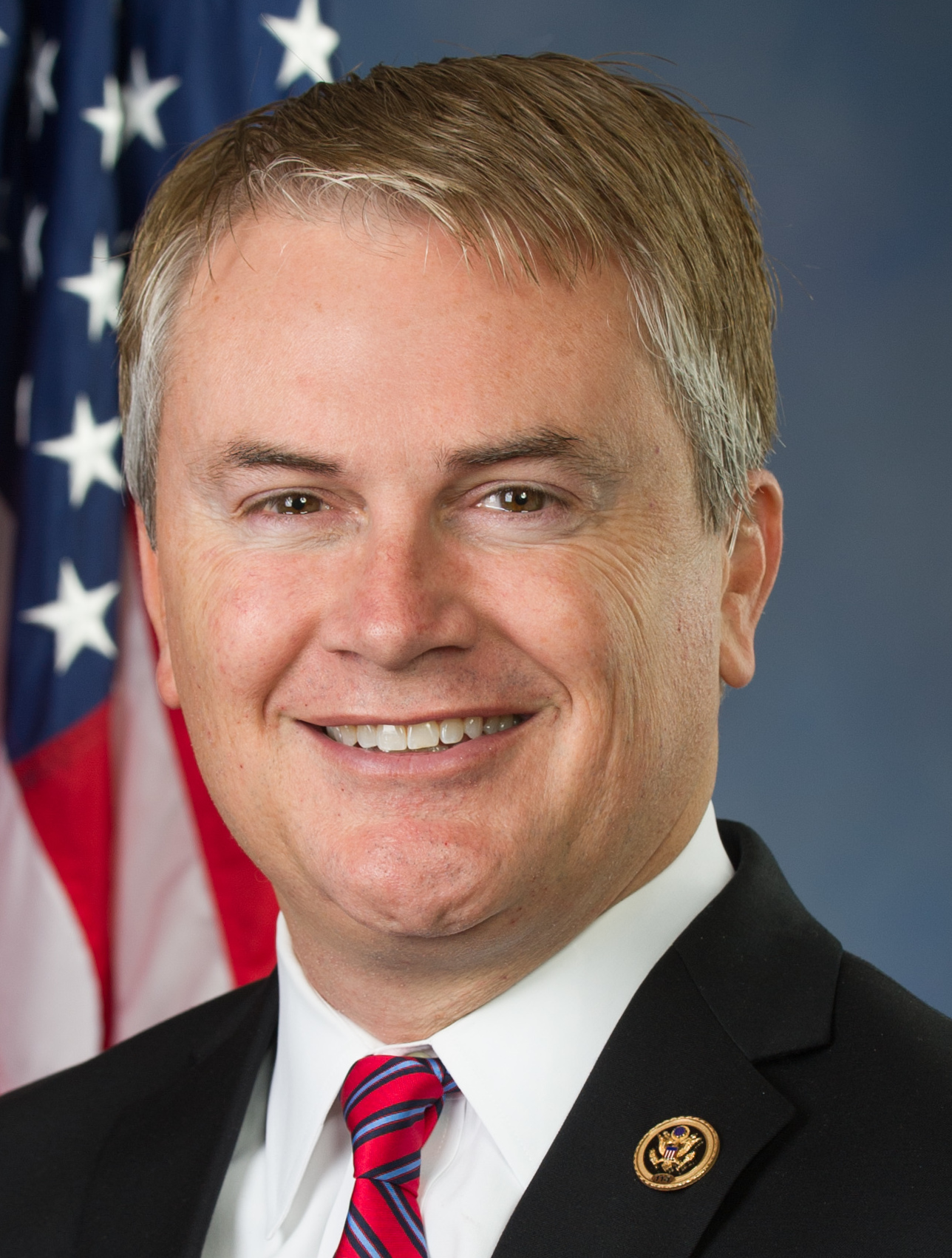

Nominee	James Comer	Sam Gaskins
Party	Republican	Democratic
Regular election	216,959; 72.6%	81,710; 27.3%
Special election	209,810; 72.2%	80,813; 27.8%
- Comer: 50–60% 60–70% 70–80% 80–90% >90%
U.S. Representative before election
Ed Whitfield
Republican
Elected U.S. Representative
James Comer
Republican

Incumbent Republican Ed Whitfield, who had represented the district since 1995, did not run for re-election for a 12th term. He was re-elected with 73% of the vote in 2014. The district had a PVI of R+18.

=== Republican primary ===
Republicans James Comer, the Agriculture Commissioner of Kentucky, and Michael Pape, Witfield's district director, ran for the Republican Party nomination. Other potential Republican candidates included former Lieutenant Governor of Kentucky nominee Robbie Rudolph, businessman Todd P'Pool, George W. Bush administration official J. Scott Jennings, and Whitfield's chief of staff Cory Hicks. State Senator Max Wise also was considered a potential candidate, but he endorsed Comer. In the May 17 primary, Comer won with 61% of the vote and went on to face Democrat Sam Gaskins in the general election.

==== Candidates ====
===== Nominee =====
- James Comer, former Kentucky Agriculture Commissioner and candidate for governor in 2015

===== Eliminated in primary =====
- Jason Batts, Hickman County Attorney
- Miles A. Caughey Jr.
- Michael Pape, district director for Congressman Ed Whitfield

===== Declined =====
- Cory Hicks, former chief of staff to Congressman Ed Whitfield
- J. Scott Jennings, former White House aide
- Todd P'Pool, former Hopkins County Attorney and nominee for attorney general in 2011
- Robbie Rudolph, businessman, former secretary of Executive Cabinet, former State Secretary of Finance and nominee for lieutenant governor in 2007
- Ed Whitfield, incumbent U.S. Representative (endorsed Pape)
- Max Wise, state senator (endorsed Comer)

==== Results ====
County results Map legend: Comer—>90%; Comer—80–90%; Comer—70–80%; Comer—60–70%; Comer—50–60%; Comer—40–50%; Pape—70–80%; Pape—50–60%; Pape—40–50%; Batts—>90%; Batts—70–80%; Batts—50–60%

Republican primary results
Party	Candidate	Votes	%
Republican	James Comer	24,342	60.6
Republican	Mike Pape	9,357	23.3
Republican	Jason Batts	5,578	13.9
Republican	Miles A. Caughey, Jr.	896	2.2
Total votes		40,173	100.0

=== Democratic primary ===
==== Candidates ====
===== Nominee =====
- Sam Gaskins, construction worker

===== Withdrawn =====
- Tom Osborne, attorney

===== Declined =====
- Brandi Harless, vice chair of the Kentucky Democratic Party and co-founder and CEO of Personal Medicine Plus
- David Ramey, chair of the Calloway County Democratic Party
- Dorsey Ridley, state senator
- John Tilley, Secretary of the Kentucky Department of Justice and Public Safety and former state representative
- Gerald Watkins, state representative

=== Special election ===
Whitfield resigned on September 6, 2016. A special election was held on November 8, concurrently with the regularly scheduled election.

==== Candidates ====
===== Republican nominee =====
- James Comer, former Kentucky Agriculture Commissioner and candidate for governor in 2015

===== Democratic nominee =====
- Sam Gaskins, construction worker

==== Results ====
Kentucky's 1st congressional district special election, 2016
Party	Candidate	Votes	%
Republican	James Comer	209,810	72.2
Democratic	Sam Gaskins	80,813	27.8
Total votes		290,623	100.0
Republican hold			

=== General election ===
==== Predictions ====
Source	Ranking	As of
The Cook Political Report	Safe R	November 7, 2016
Daily Kos Elections	Safe R	November 7, 2016
Rothenberg	Safe R	November 3, 2016
Sabato's Crystal Ball	Safe R	November 7, 2016
RCP	Safe R	October 31, 2016

==== Results ====
Kentucky's 1st congressional district, 2016
Party	Candidate	Votes	%
Republican	James Comer	216,959	72.6
Democratic	Sam Gaskins	81,710	27.3
Independent	Terry McIntosh (write-in)	332	0.1
Total votes		299,001	100.0
Republican hold			

== District 2 ==
2016 Kentucky's 2nd congressional district election
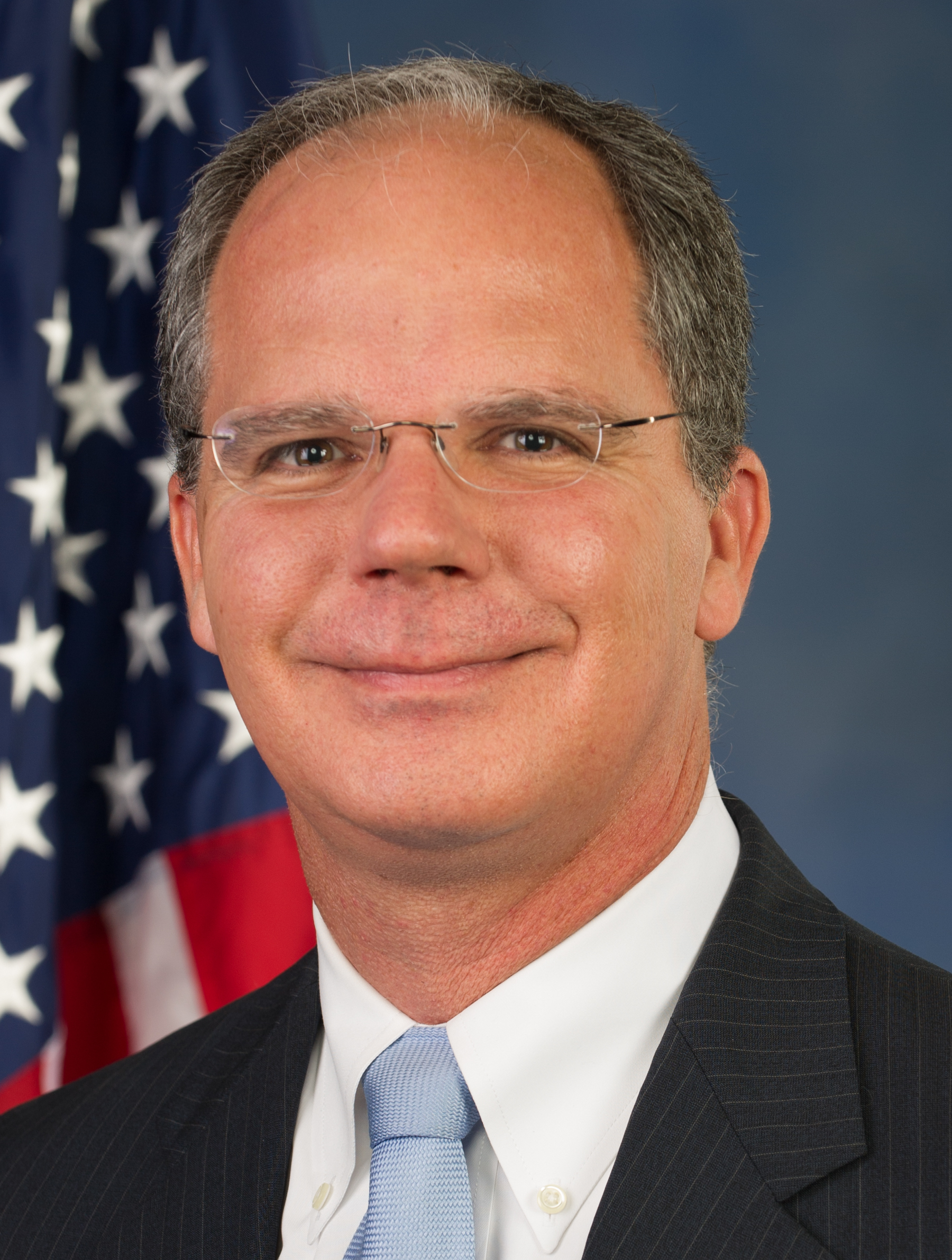
Nominee	Brett Guthrie
Party	Republican
Popular vote	251,825
Percentage	100.0%
U.S. Representative before election
Brett Guthrie
Republican
Elected U.S. Representative
Brett Guthrie
Republican

Incumbent Republican Brett Guthrie, who had represented the district since 2009, ran for re-election. He was re-elected with 69% of the vote in 2014. The district had a PVI of R+16.

=== Republican primary ===
==== Candidates ====
===== Nominee =====
- Brett Guthrie, incumbent U.S. Representative

=== Democratic primary ===
No Democrats filed to run.

=== General election ===
==== Predictions ====
Source	Ranking	As of
The Cook Political Report	Safe R	November 7, 2016
Daily Kos Elections	Safe R	November 7, 2016
Rothenberg	Safe R	November 3, 2016
Sabato's Crystal Ball	Safe R	November 7, 2016
RCP	Safe R	October 31, 2016

==== Results ====
Kentucky's 2nd Congressional District, 2016
Party	Candidate	Votes	%
Republican	Brett Guthrie (incumbent)	251,825	100.0
Total votes		251,825	100.0
Republican hold			

== District 3 ==
2016 Kentucky's 3rd congressional district election
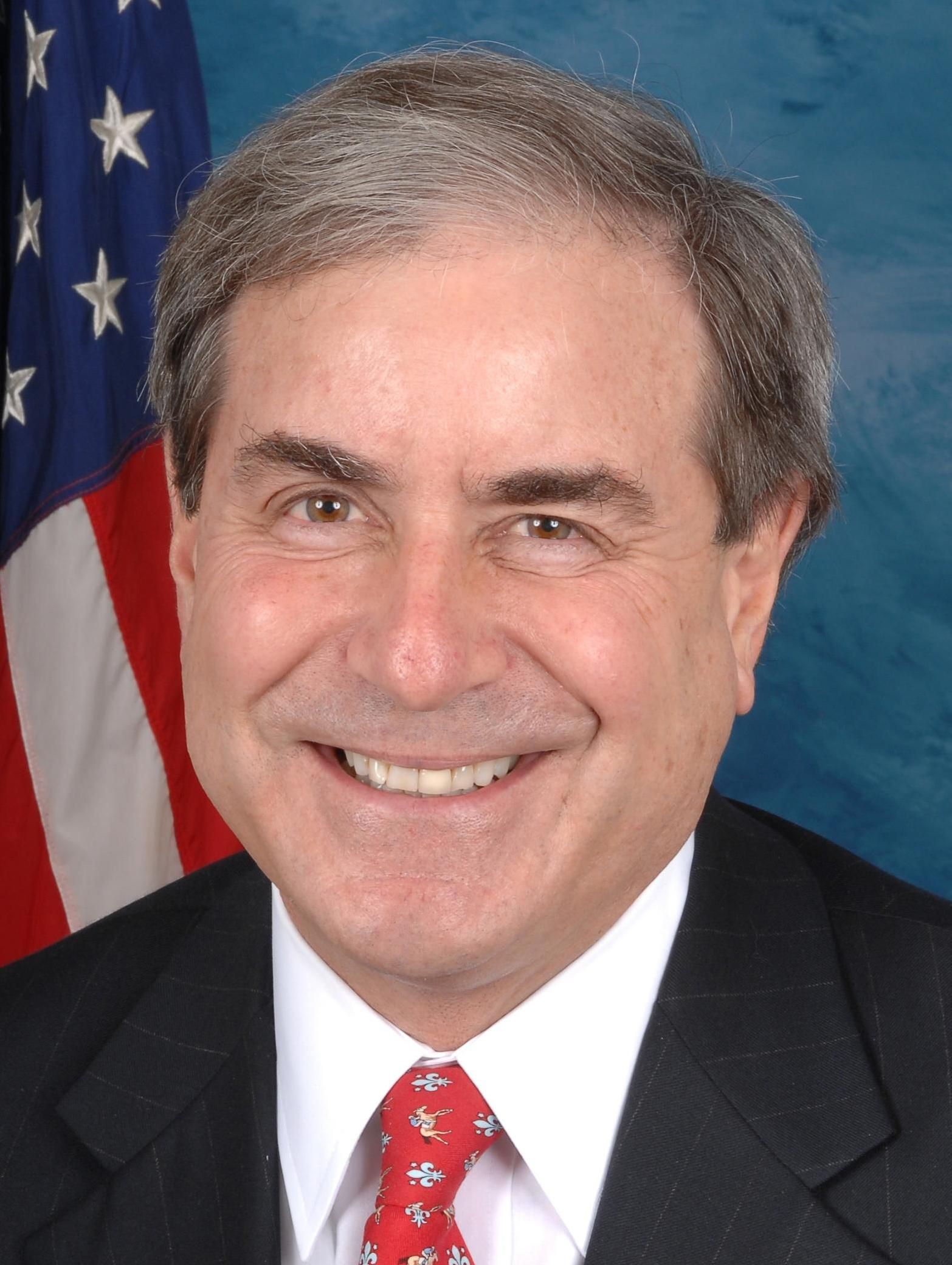

Nominee	John Yarmuth	Harold Bratcher
Party	Democratic	Republican
Popular vote	212,401	122,093
Percentage	63.5%	36.5%
- County result Yarmuth: 60–70%
U.S. Representative before election
John Yarmuth
Democratic
Elected U.S. Representative
John Yarmuth
Democratic

Incumbent Democrat John Yarmuth, who had represented the district since 2007, ran for re-election. He was re-elected with 64% of the vote in 2014. The district had a PVI of D+4.

=== Democratic primary ===
==== Candidates ====
===== Nominee =====
- John Yarmuth, incumbent U.S. Representative

=== Republican primary ===
==== Candidates ====
===== Nominee =====
- Harold Bratcher, business owner

===== Eliminated in primary =====
- Everett Corley, real estate agent
- Bob DeVore Jr., former McCreary County Board of Education member (2001–2007) and perennial candidate (Note: Candidate for Kentucky's 16th Senate district in 2006; candidate for Kentucky's 3rd congressional district in 2008, and 2012; candidate for Kentucky's 46th House district in 2010; Republican nominee for Mayor of Louisville in 2014)

==== Results ====
Republican primary results
Party	Candidate	Votes	%
Republican	Harold Bratcher	9,578	44.6
Republican	Everett Corley	7,857	36.5
Republican	Robert DeVore, Jr.	4,075	18.9
Total votes		21,510	100.0

=== General election ===
==== Predictions ====
Source	Ranking	As of
The Cook Political Report	Safe D	November 7, 2016
Daily Kos Elections	Safe D	November 7, 2016
Rothenberg	Safe D	November 3, 2016
Sabato's Crystal Ball	Safe D	November 7, 2016
RCP	Safe D	October 31, 2016

==== Results ====
Kentucky's 3rd congressional district, 2016
Party	Candidate	Votes	%
Democratic	John Yarmuth (incumbent)	212,401	63.5
Republican	Harold Bratcher	122,093	36.5
Total votes		334,494	100.0
Democratic hold			

== District 4 ==
2016 Kentucky's 4th congressional district election
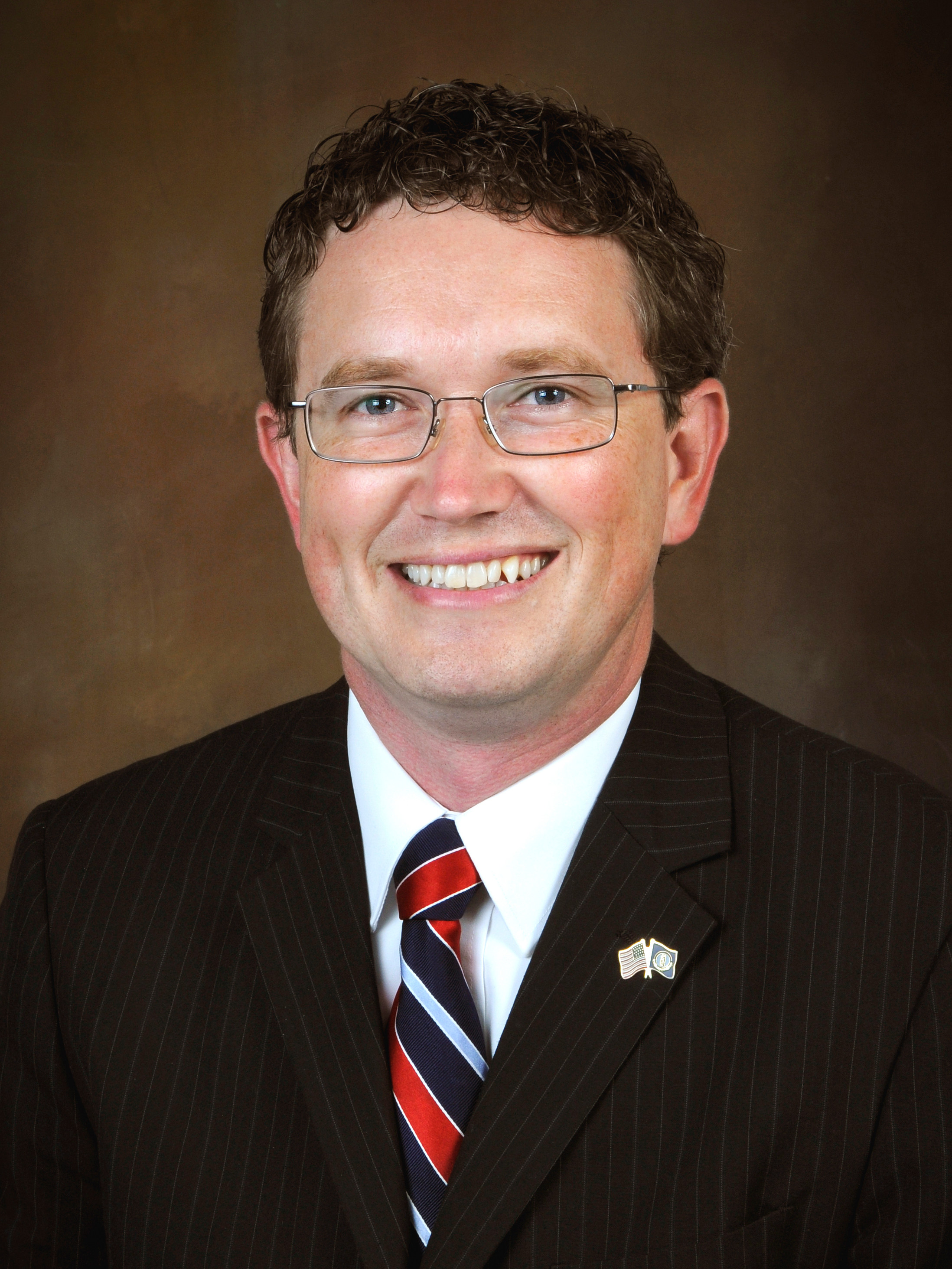

Nominee	Thomas Massie	Calvin Sidle
Party	Republican	Democratic
Popular vote	233,922	94,065
Percentage	71.3%	28.7%
- County results Massie: 60–70% 70–80% 80–90%
U.S. Representative before election
Thomas Massie
Republican
Elected U.S. Representative
Thomas Massie
Republican

Incumbent Republican Thomas Massie, who had represented the district since 2013, ran for re-election. He was re-elected with 68% of the vote in 2014. The district had a PVI of R+16.

=== Republican primary ===
==== Candidates ====
===== Nominee =====
- Thomas Massie, incumbent U.S. Representative

=== Democratic primary ===
==== Candidates ====
===== Nominee =====
- Calvin Sidle, former candidate for Pikeville City Commissioner

=== General election ===
==== Predictions ====
Source	Ranking	As of
The Cook Political Report	Safe R	November 7, 2016
Daily Kos Elections	Safe R	November 7, 2016
Rothenberg	Safe R	November 3, 2016
Sabato's Crystal Ball	Safe R	November 7, 2016
RCP	Safe R	October 31, 2016

==== Results ====
Kentucky's 4th Congressional District, 2016
Party	Candidate	Votes	%
Republican	Thomas Massie (incumbent)	233,922	71.3
Democratic	Calvin Sidle	94,065	28.7
Total votes		327,987	100.0
Republican hold			

== District 5 ==
2016 Kentucky's 5th congressional district election
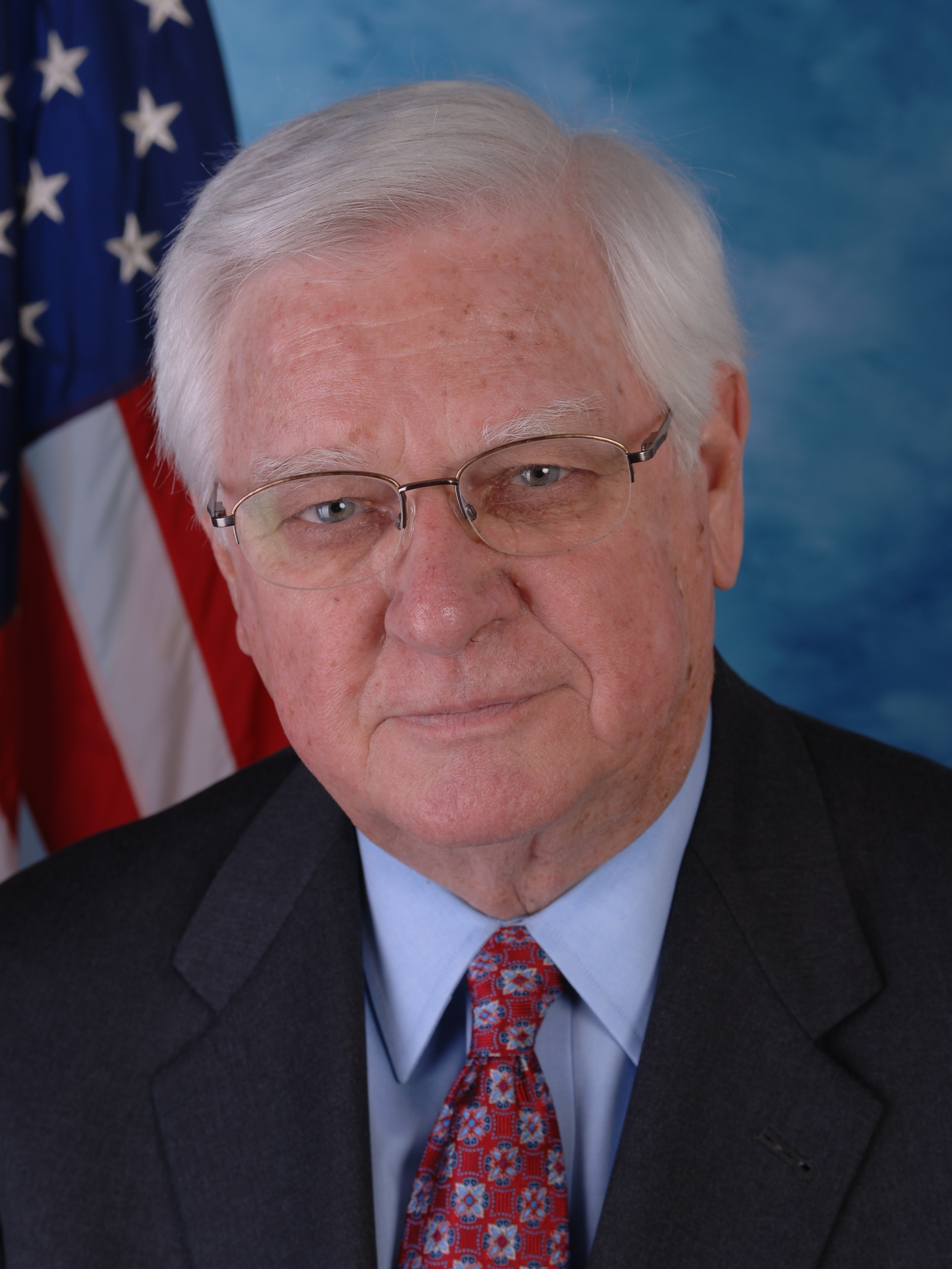
Nominee	Hal Rogers
Party	Republican
Popular vote	221,242
Percentage	100.0%
U.S. Representative before election
Hal Rogers
Republican
Elected U.S. Representative
Hal Rogers
Republican

Incumbent Republican Hal Rogers, who had represented the district since 1981, ran for re-election. He was re-elected with 78% of the vote in 2014. The district had a PVI of R+25.

=== Republican primary ===
==== Candidates ====
===== Nominee =====
- Hal Rogers, incumbent U.S. Representative

===== Eliminated in primary =====
- John Burk Jr., insurance industry worker

==== Results ====
Republican primary results
Party	Candidate	Votes	%
Republican	Hal Rogers (incumbent)	35,984	82.4
Republican	John Burk, Jr.	7,669	17.6
Total votes		43,653	100.0

=== Democratic primary ===
No Democrats filed to run.

=== General election ===
==== Predictions ====
Source	Ranking	As of
The Cook Political Report	Safe R	November 7, 2016
Daily Kos Elections	Safe R	November 7, 2016
Rothenberg	Safe R	November 3, 2016
Sabato's Crystal Ball	Safe R	November 7, 2016
RCP	Safe R	October 31, 2016

==== Results ====
Kentucky's 5th congressional district, 2016
Party	Candidate	Votes	%
Republican	Hal Rogers (Incumbent)	221,242	100.0
Total votes		221,242	100.0
Republican hold			

== District 6 ==
2016 Kentucky's 6th congressional district election
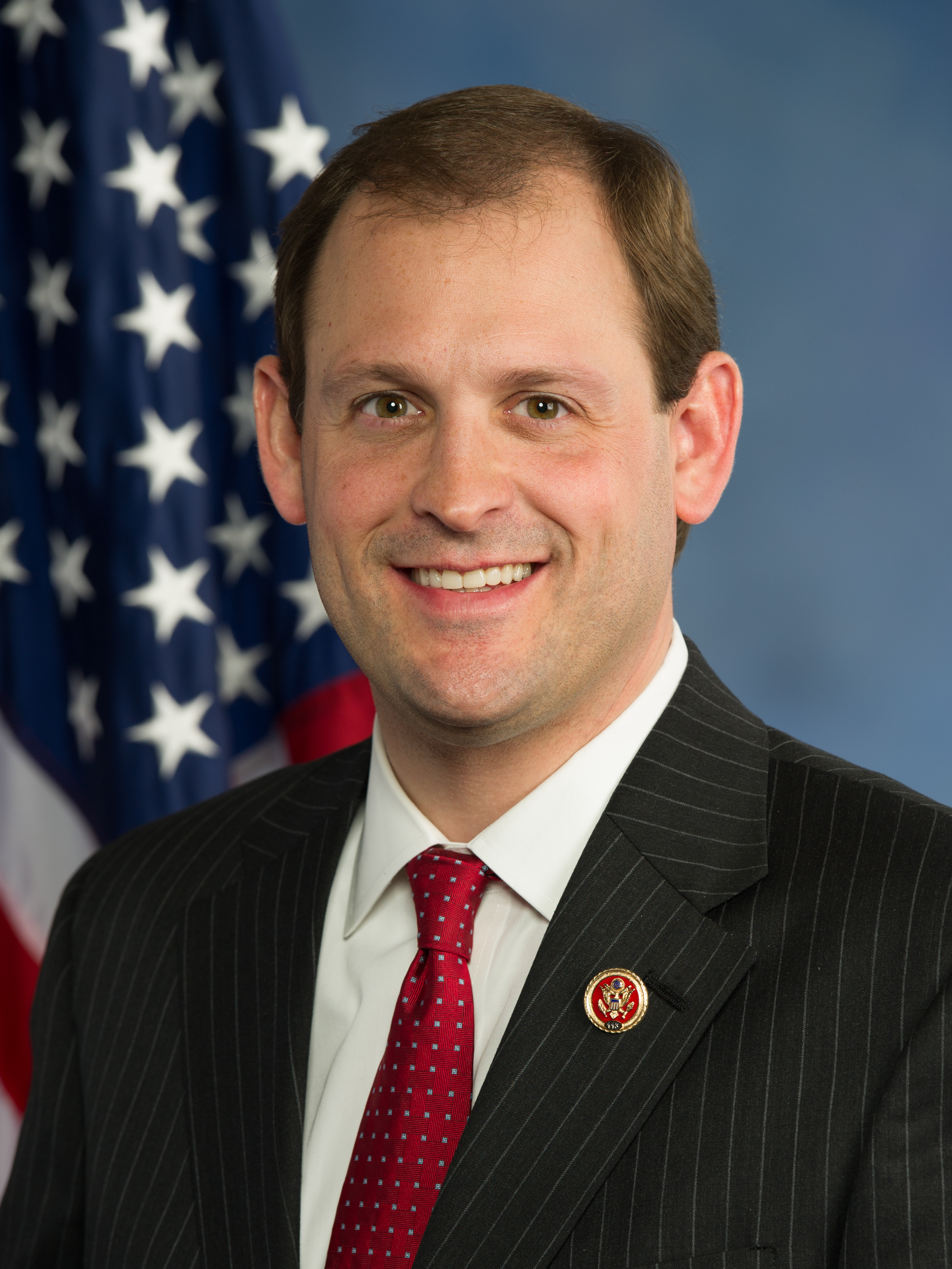

Nominee	Andy Barr	Nancy Jo Kemper
Party	Republican	Democratic
Popular vote	202,099	128,728
Percentage	61.1%	38.9%
- County results Barr: 50–60% 60–70% 70–80%
U.S. Representative before election
Andy Barr
Republican
Elected U.S. Representative
Andy Barr
Republican

Incumbent Republican Andy Barr, who had represented the district since 2013, ran for re-election. He was re-elected with 60% of the vote in 2014. The district had a PVI of R+9.

=== Republican primary ===
==== Candidates ====
===== Nominee =====
- Andy Barr, incumbent U.S. Representative

===== Eliminated in primary =====
- Roger Brill

==== Results ====
Republican primary results
Party	Candidate	Votes	%
Republican	Andy Barr (Incumbent)	25,212	84.55
Republican	Roger Brill	4,608	15.45
Total votes		29,820	100.0

=== Democratic primary ===
Matt Jones, host and founder of Kentucky Sports Radio, considered challenging Representative Barr, but announced on November 23, 2015, that he would not do so. Rev. Nancy Jo Kemper, a graduate of Yale Divinity School and former executive director of the Kentucky Council of Churches, announced she would run for the Democratic nomination on January 21, 2016.

Geoff Young, candidate for governor in Kentucky in 2014, and Michael Coblenz, a candidate for Kentucky state house in 2010 competed with Kemper for the chance to challenge Barr in the general election. Michael Coblenz later withdrew, leaving Rev. Kemper and Young as the only Democratic candidates.

==== Candidates ====
===== Nominee =====
- Nancy Jo Kemper, former executive director of the Kentucky Council of Churches

===== Eliminated in primary =====
- Geoff Young, perennial candidate

===== Withdrawn =====
- Michael Coblenz, attorney and former Air Force B-52 navigator

===== Declined =====
- Matt Jones, host and founder of Kentucky Sports Radio

==== Endorsements ====
Nancy Jo Kemper

Statewide officials

- Crit Luallen, former Lieutenant Governor of Kentucky
- Alison Lundergan Grimes, Secretary of State of Kentucky

State legislators

- Reggie Thomas, state senator
- Susan Westrom, state representative

==== Results ====
Democratic primary results
Party	Candidate	Votes	%
Democratic	Nancy Jo Kemper	63,440	80.1
Democratic	Geoff Young	15,772	19.9
Total votes		79,212	100

=== General election ===
==== Predictions ====
Source	Ranking	As of
The Cook Political Report	Safe R	November 7, 2016
Daily Kos Elections	Safe R	November 7, 2016
Rothenberg	Safe R	November 3, 2016
Sabato's Crystal Ball	Safe R	November 7, 2016
RCP	Safe R	October 31, 2016

==== Results ====
Kentucky's 6th congressional district, 2016
Party	Candidate	Votes	%
Republican	Andy Barr (incumbent)	202,099	61.1
Democratic	Nancy Jo Kemper	128,728	38.9
Total votes		330,827	100.0
Republican hold			
