= 2016 Kentucky House of Representatives election =

- November 8, 2016

All 100 seats in the Kentucky House of Representatives 51 seats needed for a majority
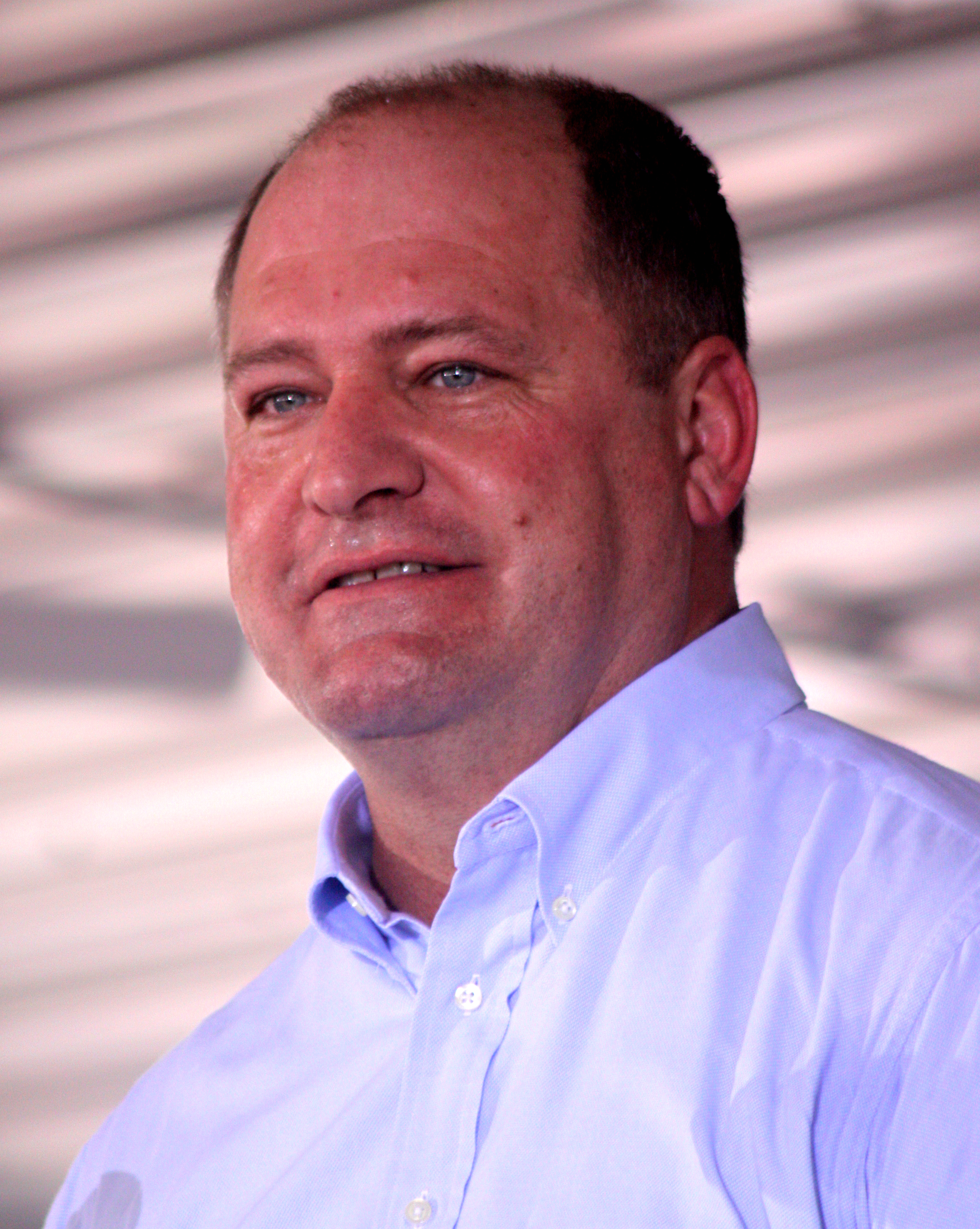

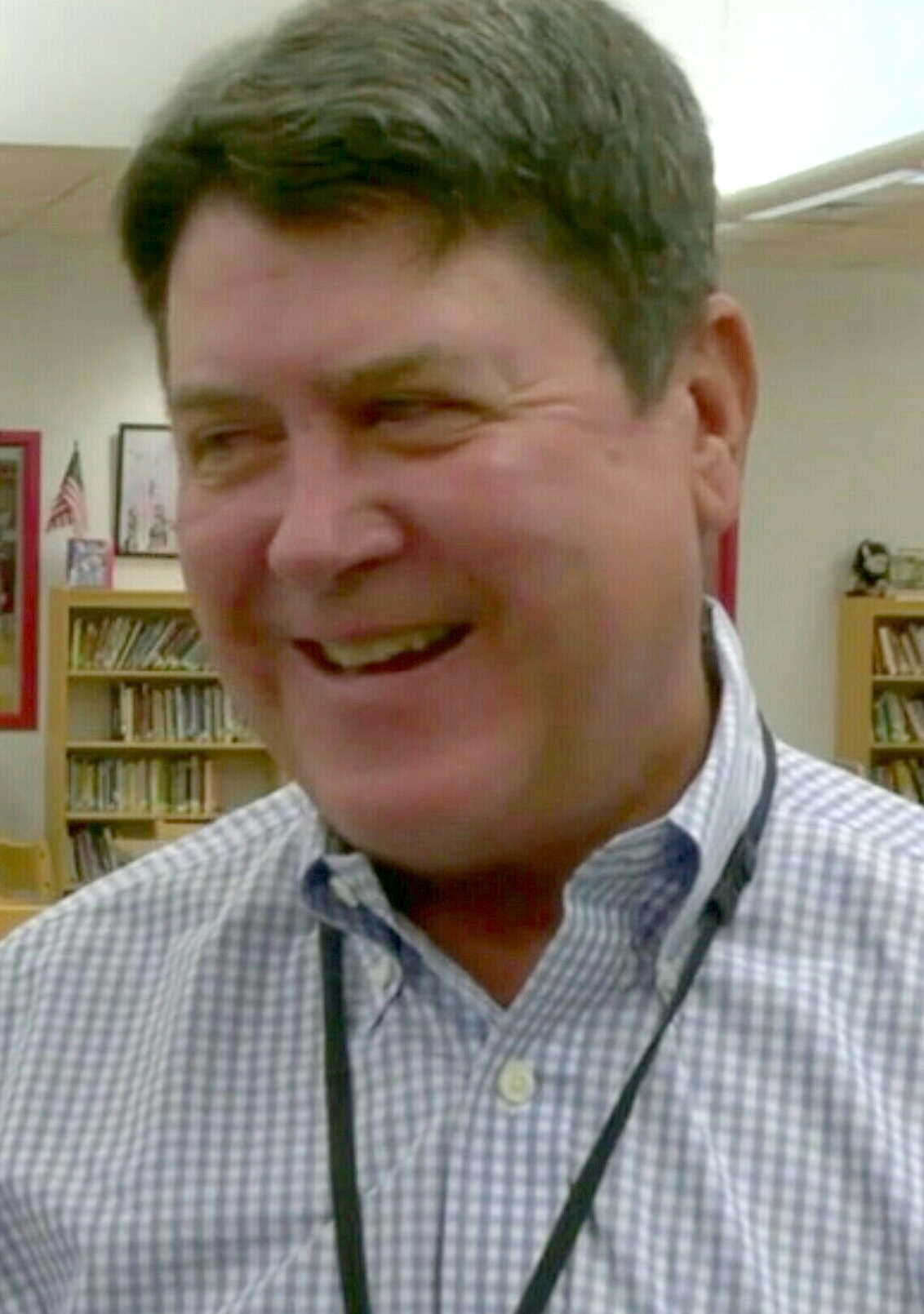
| | Majority party | Minority party |
|---|---|---|
| Leader | Jeff Hoover | Greg Stumbo (lost reelection) |
| Party | Republican | Democratic |
| Leader's seat | 83rd – Jamestown | 95th – Prestonsburg |
| Last election | 46 | 54 |
| Seats before | 47 (Note: Two democratic incumbents switched parties after the 2014 election.) | 53 (Note: Democrats flipped a seat in a March 2016 special election following the resignation of Ryan Quarles.) |
| Seats won | 64 | 36 |
| Seat change | ▲17 | ▼17 |
- Republican hold Republican gain Democratic hold Democratic gain 50–60% 60–70% 70–80% >90% 50–60% 60–70% 70–80% 80–90% >90%
Speaker before election
Greg Stumbo
Democratic
Elected Speaker
Jeff Hoover
Republican

The 2016 Kentucky House of Representatives elections were held on November 8, 2016, as part of the biennial United States elections. All 100 of Kentucky's state representatives were up for reelection. In Kentucky, members of the House of Representatives serve two-year terms. Accordingly, they are up for reelection in both presidential and midterm election years.

Republicans gained 17 seats in the election, winning the chamber outright. This ended nearly 100 years of Democratic control of the house, as the last time that Republicans won a majority was in 1919. Republicans performed well in rural districts and flipped many seats held by Democrats, including Democratic Speaker Greg Stumbo who lost reelection. Together with Republican governor Matt Bevin, this was the first time in history that Republicans gained a trifecta in the state.

A numbered map of the house districts at the time can be viewed here.

== Retiring incumbents ==
Brad Montell resigned in October 2016. Thomas Kerr resigned in September 2016.

=== Democratic ===
1. 23rd: Johnny Bell: Retired.
2. 46th: Larry Clark: Retired.
3. 70th: Mike Denham: Retired.
4. 94th: Leslie A. Combs: Retired.

=== Republican ===
1. 48th: Bob DeWeese: Retired.
2. 50th: David Floyd: Retired.

== Defeated incumbents ==
=== In primary elections ===
==== Democratic ====
1. 41st: Tom Riner (first elected in 1981) lost renomination to Attica Scott, who won the general election.

=== Republican ===
1. 33rd: Ronald Crimm (first elected in 1996) lost renomination to Jason Nemes, who won the general election.

=== In general elections ===
==== Democratic ====
1. 8th: Jeffery R. Taylor (elected in March 2016) lost to Walker Thomas.
2. 11th: David Watkins (first elected in 2006) lost to Robby Mills.
3. 13th: Jim Glenn (first elected in 2006) lost to DJ Johnson.
4. 14th: Tommy Thompson (first elected in 2002) lost to Matt Castlen.
5. 15th: Brent Yonts (first elected in 1996) lost to Melinda Gibbons Prunty.
6. 16th: Martha Jane King (first elected in 2008) lost to Jason Petrie.
7. 24th: Terry Mills (first elected in 2010) lost to Brandon Reed.
8. 49th: Linda H. Belcher (first elected in 2008) lost to Dan Johnson.
9. 62nd: Chuck Tackett (elected in March 2016) lost to Phillip Pratt.
10. 78th: Tom McKee (first elected in 1996) lost to Mark Hart.
11. 81st: Rita Smart (first elected in 2010) lost to C. Wesley Morgan.
12. 84th: Fitz Steele (first elected in 2008) lost to Chris Fugate.
13. 91st: Cluster Howard (first elected in 2014) lost to Toby Herald.
14. 92nd: John Short (first elected in 2010) lost to John Blanton.
15. 95th: Greg Stumbo (first elected in 1979) lost to Larry D. Brown.
16. 97th: Hubert Collins (first elected in 1990) lost to Scott Wells.
17. 98th: Lew Nicholls (elected in March 2016) lost to Danny Bentley.

=== Republican ===
1. 38th: Denver Butler (first elected in 2012) lost to McKenzie Cantrell.

== Predictions ==
| Source | Ranking | As of |
|---|---|---|
| Governing | Tossup | October 12, 2016 |

== Crossover seats ==
36 districts voted for one party in the 2012 presidential election and another in the 2014 house election.

=== Democratic ===
This lists the districts in which Mitt Romney won in 2012 but were represented by Democrats:

| District | | Incumbent | | |
| # | Romney margin of victory in 2012 | Member | Party | Incumbent margin of victory in 2014 |
|---|---|---|---|---|
| 3 | R+17.35 | Gerald Watkins | Democratic | D+7.23 |
| 6 | R+34.17 | Will Coursey | Democratic | D+12.91 |
| 8 | R+8.64 | John Tilley | Democratic | Unopposed |
| 10 | R+17.56 | Dean Schamore | Democratic | D+7.26 |
| 11 | R+11.52 | David Watkins | Democratic | D+26.93 |
| 12 | R+36.38 | Jim Gooch Jr. | Democratic | D+19.92 |
| 13 | R+5.70 | Jim Glenn | Democratic | D+4.56 |
| 14 | R+34.03 | Tommy Thompson | Democratic | D+23.53 |
| 15 | R+28.09 | Brent Yonts | Democratic | Unopposed |
| 16 | R+34.98 | Martha Jane King | Democratic | D+18.99 |
| 20 | R+2.66 | Jody Richards | Democratic | D+26.68 |
| 22 | R+37.33 | Wilson Stone | Democratic | Unopposed |
| 23 | R+33.45 | Johnny W. Bell | Democratic | D+8.64 |
| 24 | R+28.04 | Terry Mills | Democratic | D+9.22 |
| 27 | R+13.88 | Jeff Greer | Democratic | D+13.65 |
| 28 | R+8.77 | Charles Miller | Democratic | Unopposed |
| 39 | R+31.27 | Russ Meyer | Democratic | D+11.29 |
| 47 | R+18.25 | Rick Rand | Democratic | Unopposed |
| 49 | R+32.76 | Linda H. Belcher | Democratic | D+5.84 |
| 56 | R+13.19 | James Kay | Democratic | D+19.61 |
| 67 | R+0.74 | Dennis Keene | Democratic | Unopposed |
| 70 | R+27.31 | Mike Denham | Democratic | Unopposed |
| 72 | R+17.93 | Sannie Overly | Democratic | D+29.71 |
| 78 | R+27.11 | Tom McKee | Democratic | D+8.03 |
| 81 | R+14.07 | Rita Smart | Democratic | D+17.23 |
| 84 | R+60.97 | Fitz Steele | Democratic | Unopposed |
| 87 | R+55.30 | Rick Nelson | Democratic | Unopposed |
| 91 | R+45.63 | Cluster Howard | Democratic | D+0.10 |
| 92 | R+45.69 | John Short | Democratic | Unopposed |
| 93 | R+52.93 | Chris Harris | Democratic | Unopposed |
| 94 | R+56.00 | Leslie A. Combs | Democratic | Unopposed |
| 95 | R+35.96 | Greg Stumbo | Democratic | Unopposed |
| 97 | R+47.24 | Hubert Collins | Democratic | D+26.33 |
| 98 | R+19.11 | Tanya Pullin | Democratic | Unopposed |
| 99 | R+17.02 | Rocky Adkins | Democratic | Unopposed |
| 100 | R+15.78 | Kevin Sinnette | Democratic | Unopposed |

=== Republican ===
No districts which Barack Obama won in 2012 were represented by Republicans.

== Closest races ==
Seats where the margin of victory was under 10%:

1. District 81, 0.42% gain
2. District 49, 0.84% gain
3. District 100, 0.88%
4. District 94, 1.46%
5. District 13, 1.58% gain
6. District 38, 1.74% gain
7. District 93, 2.76%
8. District 87, 3.00%
9. District 92, 3.04% gain
10. District 11, 3.24% gain
11. District 8, 3.74% gain
12. District 37, 4.02%
13. District 6, 4.76%
14. District 95, 5.90% gain
15. District 28, 6.54%
16. District 27, 7.68%
17. District 24, 8.14% gain
18. District 98, 8.22% gain
19. District 72, 8.50%
20. District 78, 8.88% gain

== Results by district ==
| District | Democratic | | | Republican | | | Total |
| District | Candidate | % | Vote | Candidate | % | Vote | Total |
|---|---|---|---|---|---|---|---|
| 1 | Michael R. Murphy | 29.80% | 5,963 | Steven Rudy (I) | 70.20% | 14,046 | 20,009 |
| 2 | Jesse Edward Wright | 39.53% | 7,647 | Richard Heath (I) | 60.47% | 11,699 | 19,346 |
| 3 | Gerald Watkins (I) | 55.36% | 9,869 | Joni S. Hogancamp | 44.64% | 7,958 | 17,827 |
| 4 | No candidate | 0.00% | 0 | Lynn Bechler (I) | 100.00% | 15,065 | 15,065 |
| 5 | David Ramey | 30.88% | 6,153 | Kenny Imes (I) | 69.12% | 13,770 | 19,923 |
| 6 | Will Coursey (I) | 52.38% | 11,399 | Paula Rush Robinson | 43.16% | 9,393 | 21,764 |
| 7 | Joy Gray | 37.01% | 7,750 | Suzanne Miles (I) | 62.99% | 13,189 | 20,939 |
| 8 | Jeffery R. Taylor (I) | 48.13% | 6,103 | Walker Thomas | 51.87% | 6,577 | 12,680 |
| 9 | No candidate | 0.00% | 0 | Myron Dossett (I) | 100.00% | 11,425 | 11,425 |
| 10 | Dean Schamore (I) | 55.19% | 10,712 | T. W. Shortt | 44.81% | 8,698 | 19,410 |
| 11 | David Watkins (I) | 48.38% | 9,117 | Robby Mills | 51.62% | 9,728 | 18,845 |
| 12 | Jim Townsend | 38.80% | 8,059 | Jim Gooch Jr. (I) | 61.20% | 12,711 | 20,770 |
| 13 | Jim Glenn (I) | 49.21% | 8,170 | DJ Johnson | 50.79% | 8,434 | 16,604 |
| 14 | Tommy Thompson (I) | 36.45% | 7,775 | Matt Castlen | 63.55% | 13,554 | 21,329 |
| 15 | Brent Yonts (I) | 42.93% | 7,973 | Melinda Gibbons Prunty | 57.07% | 10,597 | 18,570 |
| 16 | Martha Jane King (I) | 34.60% | 5,788 | Jason Petrie | 65.40% | 10,938 | 16,726 |
| 17 | No candidate | 0.00% | 0 | Jim DeCesare (I) | 100.00% | 17,761 | 17,761 |
| 18 | No candidate | 0.00% | 0 | Tim Moore (I) | 100.00% | 14,996 | 14,996 |
| 19 | John Wayne Smith | 31.07% | 5,614 | Michael Meredith (I) | 68.93% | 12,455 | 18,069 |
| 20 | Jody Richards (I) | 58.23% | 8,561 | Melinda Hill | 41.77% | 6,140 | 14,701 |
| 21 | No candidate | 0.00% | 0 | Bart Rowland (I) | 100.00% | 13,728 | 13,728 |
| 22 | Wilson Stone (I) | 100.00% | 12,115 | No candidate | 0.00% | 0 | 12,115 |
| 23 | Danny J. Basil | 38.46% | 7,154 | Steve Riley | 61.54% | 11,445 | 18,599 |
| 24 | Terry Mills (I) | 45.93% | 8,972 | Brandon Reed | 54.07% | 10,563 | 19,535 |
| 25 | Michael D. Dile | 27.57% | 5,187 | Jim DuPlessis (I) | 72.43% | 13,629 | 18,816 |
| 26 | No candidate | 0.00% | 0 | Russell Webber (I) | 100.00% | 14,565 | 14,565 |
| 27 | Jeff Greer (I) | 53.84% | 9,056 | Rachelle Frazier | 46.16% | 7,763 | 16,819 |
| 28 | Charles Miller (I) | 53.27% | 8,953 | Michael Payne | 46.73% | 7,854 | 16,807 |
| 29 | No candidate | 0.00% | 0 | Kevin Bratcher (I) | 100.00% | 17,535 | 17,535 |
| 30 | Tom Burch (I) | 76.79% | 12,678 | Waymen Eddings | 23.21% | 3,833 | 16,511 |
| 31 | Steve Riggs (I) | 57.89% | 12,085 | Sarah Provancher | 42.11% | 8,792 | 20,877 |
| 32 | No candidate | 0.00% | 0 | Phil Moffett (I) | 100.00% | 15,243 | 15,243 |
| 33 | Rob Walker | 44.39% | 11,291 | Jason Nemes | 55.61% | 14,146 | 25,437 |
| 34 | Mary Lou Marzian (I) | 100.00% | 19,596 | No candidate | 0.00% | 0 | 19,596 |
| 35 | Jim Wayne (I) | 100.00% | 13,913 | No candidate | 0.00% | 0 | 13,913 |
| 36 | No candidate | 0.00% | 0 | Jerry T. Miller (I) | 100.00% | 21,458 | 21,458 |
| 37 | Jeffery Donohue (I) | 52.01% | 7,387 | Mark Wilson | 47.99% | 6,817 | 14,204 |
| 38 | McKenzie Cantrell | 50.87% | 7,600 | Denver Butler (I) | 49.13% | 7,341 | 14,941 |
| 39 | Russ Meyer (I) | 55.84% | 10,839 | Robert L. Guilette III | 44.16% | 8,572 | 19,411 |
| 40 | Dennis Horlander (I) | 73.55% | 11,038 | George Demic | 26.45% | 3,970 | 15,008 |
| 41 | Attica Scott | 100.00% | 13,257 | No candidate | 0.00% | 0 | 13,257 |
| 42 | Reginald Meeks (I) | 87.26% | 15,896 | James F. Howland | 12.74% | 2,320 | 18,216 |
| 43 | Darryl Owens (I) | 76.18% | 13,173 | John Mark Owen | 23.82% | 4,120 | 17,293 |
| 44 | Joni Jenkins (I) | 100.00% | 13,538 | No candidate | 0.00% | 0 | 13,538 |
| 45 | Pam Sigler | 39.39% | 9,991 | Stan Lee (I) | 60.61% | 15,375 | 25,366 |
| 46 | Al Gentry | 55.31% | 9,939 | Eric Crump | 44.69% | 8,032 | 17,971 |
| 47 | Rick Rand (I) | 100.00% | 13,033 | No candidate | 0.00% | 0 | 13,033 |
| 48 | Maria Sorolis | 42.81% | 11,302 | Ken Fleming | 57.19% | 15,097 | 26,399 |
| 49 | Linda H. Belcher (I) | 49.58% | 9,186 | Dan Johnson | 50.42% | 9,342 | 18,528 |
| 50 | James DeWeese | 36.37% | 7,457 | Chad McCoy | 63.63% | 13,048 | 20,505 |
| 51 | No candidate | 0.00% | 0 | John "Bam" Carney (I) | 100.00% | 16,344 | 16,344 |
| 52 | No candidate | 0.00% | 0 | Ken Upchurch (I) | 100.00% | 13,376 | 13,376 |
| 53 | James M. Sargent | 27.58% | 6,127 | James Tipton (I) | 72.42% | 16,091 | 22,218 |
| 54 | Bill Noelker | 33.13% | 6,245 | Daniel Elliott (I) | 66.87% | 12,607 | 18,852 |
| 55 | Tobie C. Brown | 24.99% | 5,597 | Kim King (I) | 75.01% | 16,797 | 22,394 |
| 56 | James Kay (I) | 59.63% | 12,590 | Daniel A. Fister | 40.37% | 8,525 | 21,115 |
| 57 | Derrick Graham (I) | 100.00% | 15,747 | No candidate | 0.00% | 0 | 15,747 |
| 58 | Cyndi Powell Skellie | 38.66% | 7,894 | Rob Rothenburger (I) | 61.34% | 12,527 | 20,421 |
| 59 | No candidate | 0.00% | 0 | David W. Osborne (I) | 100.00% | 19,159 | 19,159 |
| 60 | No candidate | 0.00% | 0 | Sal Santoro (I) | 100.00% | 19,737 | 19,737 |
| 61 | Kevin Napier | 24.39% | 4,958 | Brian Linder (I) | 75.61% | 15,373 | 20,331 |
| 62 | Chuck Tackett (I) | 42.31% | 9,288 | Phillip Pratt | 57.69% | 12,662 | 21,950 |
| 63 | No candidate | 0.00% | 0 | Diane St. Onge (I) | 100.00% | 18,728 | 18,728 |
| 64 | Lucas Deaton | 30.90% | 6,807 | Kimberly Poore Moser (I) | 69.10% | 15,220 | 22,027 |
| 65 | Arnold Simpson (I) | 100.00% | 10,099 | No candidate | 0.00% | 0 | 10,099 |
| 66 | No candidate | 0.00% | 0 | Addia Wuchner (I) | 100.00% | 18,743 | 18,743 |
| 67 | Dennis Keene (I) | 100.00% | 9,232 | No candidate | 0.00% | 0 | 9,232 |
| 68 | No candidate | 0.00% | 0 | Joseph Fischer (I) | 100.00% | 20,003 | 20,003 |
| 69 | No candidate | 0.00% | 0 | Adam Koenig (I) | 100.00% | 13,892 | 13,892 |
| 70 | John Sims Jr. | 56.18% | 10,049 | John VanMeter | 43.82% | 7,839 | 17,888 |
| 71 | No candidate | 0.00% | 0 | Jonathan Shell (I) | 100.00% | 16,951 | 16,951 |
| 72 | Sannie Overly (I) | 54.25% | 9,668 | Curtis Kenimer | 45.75% | 8,154 | 17,822 |
| 73 | John M. Hendricks | 39.60% | 7,464 | Donna Mayfield (I) | 60.40% | 11,385 | 18,849 |
| 74 | James E. Davis | 42.77% | 8,142 | David Hale (I) | 57.23% | 10,894 | 19,036 |
| 75 | Kelly Flood (I) | 61.61% | 9,816 | Gary McCollum | 38.39% | 6,116 | 15,932 |
| 76 | Ruth Ann Palumbo (I) | 100.00% | 15,028 | No candidate | 0.00% | 0 | 15,028 |
| 77 | George Brown Jr. (I) | 100.00% | 13,245 | No candidate | 0.00% | 0 | 13,245 |
| 78 | Tom McKee (I) | 45.56% | 7,562 | Mark Hart | 54.44% | 9,035 | 16,597 |
| 79 | Susan Westrom (I) | 59.36% | 11,909 | Ken Kearns | 40.64% | 8,155 | 20,064 |
| 80 | No candidate | 0.00% | 0 | David Meade (I) | 100.00% | 13,698 | 13,698 |
| 81 | Rita Smart (I) | 49.79% | 8,980 | C. Wesley Morgan | 50.21% | 9,056 | 18,036 |
| 82 | Bill Conn | 21.53% | 3,639 | Regina Bunch (I) | 78.47% | 13,265 | 16,904 |
| 83 | No candidate | 0.00% | 0 | Jeff Hoover (I) | 100.00% | 16,813 | 16,813 |
| 84 | Fitz Steele (I) | 36.91% | 6,012 | Chris Fugate | 63.09% | 10,278 | 16,290 |
| 85 | No candidate | 0.00% | 0 | Tommy Turner (I) | 100.00% | 15,858 | 15,858 |
| 86 | No candidate | 0.00% | 0 | Jim Stewart (I) | 100.00% | 14,497 | 14,497 |
| 87 | Rick Nelson (I) | 51.50% | 7,224 | Chad Shannon | 48.50% | 6,804 | 14,028 |
| 88 | No candidate | 0.00% | 0 | Robert Benvenuti (I) | 100.00% | 20,242 | 20,242 |
| 89 | No candidate | 0.00% | 0 | Marie Rader (I) | 100.00% | 15,479 | 15,479 |
| 90 | No candidate | 0.00% | 0 | Tim Couch (I) | 100.00% | 12,758 | 12,758 |
| 91 | Cluster Howard (I) | 44.79% | 7,161 | Toby Herald | 55.21% | 8,828 | 15,989 |
| 92 | John Short (I) | 48.48% | 7,287 | John Blanton | 51.52% | 7,745 | 15,032 |
| 93 | Chris Harris (I) | 51.38% | 7,363 | Norma Kirk-McCormick | 48.62% | 6,968 | 14,331 |
| 94 | Angie Hatton | 50.73% | 8,393 | Frank D. Justice II | 49.27% | 8,153 | 16,546 |
| 95 | Greg Stumbo (I) | 47.05% | 8,466 | Larry D. Brown | 52.95% | 9,528 | 17,994 |
| 96 | Josh McGuire | 41.95% | 6,760 | Jill York (I) | 58.05% | 9,353 | 16,113 |
| 97 | Hubert Collins (I) | 42.28% | 6,978 | Scott Wells | 57.72% | 9,525 | 16,503 |
| 98 | Lew Nicholls (I) | 45.89% | 8,330 | Danny Bentley | 54.11% | 9,823 | 18,153 |
| 99 | Rocky Adkins (I) | 66.00% | 11,143 | Wendy Fletcher | 34.00% | 5,741 | 16,884 |
| 100 | Kevin Sinnette (I) | 50.44% | 9,215 | Eric Chaney | 49.56% | 9,055 | 18,270 |
| Totals | | 39.93% | 695,707 | | 60.01% | 1,045,502 | 1,742,181 |
