= 2006 Kentucky elections =

A general election was held in the U.S. state of Kentucky on November 7, 2006. The primary election for all offices was held on May 16, 2006.

== Federal offices ==
=== United States House of Representatives ===
Kentucky has six congressional districts, electing four Republicans and two Democrats.

== State offices ==
=== Kentucky Senate ===
The Kentucky Senate consists of 38 members. In 2006, half of the chamber (all even-numbered districts) was up for election. Republicans maintained their majority, without gaining or losing any seats.

=== Kentucky House of Representatives ===
Results by district

All 100 seats in the Kentucky House of Representatives were up for election in 2006. Democrats maintained their majority, picking up five seats.

=== Kentucky Supreme Court ===
2006 Kentucky Supreme Court elections
- November 7, 2006

5 of the 7 districts of the Kentucky Supreme Court

The Kentucky Supreme Court consists of seven justices elected in non-partisan elections to staggered eight-year terms. Districts 1, 2, 4, and 6 were up for election in 2006. Additionally, a special election was held in District 5.

==== District 1 ====
2006 Kentucky Supreme Court 1st district election
- District 1
Candidate	Bill Cunningham	Rick Johnson
Popular vote	77,763	49,165
Percentage	61.27%	38.73%
- County results Cunningham: 50–60% 60–70% 70–80% 80–90% Johnson: 50–60% 60–70% 70–80%
Justice before election
William Graves
Elected Justice
Bill Cunningham

2006 Kentucky Supreme Court 1st district election
Candidate	Votes	%
Bill Cunningham	77,763	61.27
Rick Johnson	49,165	38.73
Total votes	126,928	100.0

==== District 2 ====
2006 Kentucky Supreme Court 2nd district election
- District 2
Candidate	John D. Minton Jr.
Popular vote	102,442
Percentage	100.0%
Justice before election
John D. Minton Jr.
Elected Justice
John D. Minton Jr.

2006 Kentucky Supreme Court 2nd district election
Candidate	Votes	%
John D. Minton Jr. (incumbent)	Unopposed	
Total votes	102,442	100.0

==== District 4 ====
2006 Kentucky Supreme Court 4th district election
- District 4
Candidate	William E. McAnulty Jr.	Ann O'Malley Shake
Popular vote	104,616	97,483
Percentage	51.8%	48.2%
Justice before election
William E. McAnulty Jr.
Elected Justice
William E. McAnulty Jr.

===== Primary election =====
Primary results
Candidate	Votes	%
William E. McAnulty Jr.	36,201	47.06
Ann O'Malley Shake	33,602	43.68
Philip C. Kimball	7,120	9.26
Total votes	76,923	100.0

===== General election =====
2006 Kentucky Supreme Court 4th district election
Candidate	Votes	%
William E. McAnulty Jr. (incumbent)	104,616	51.76
Ann O'Malley Shake	97,483	48.24
Total votes	202,099	100.0

==== District 5 ====
2006 Kentucky Supreme Court 5th district special election
- District 5
Candidate	Mary C. Noble	John C. Roach
Popular vote	96,337	65,378
Percentage	59.57%	40.43%
- County results Noble: 50–60% 60–70%
Justice before election
John C. Roach
Elected Justice
Mary C. Noble

2006 Kentucky Supreme Court 5th district special election
Candidate	Votes	%
Mary C. Noble	96,337	59.57
John C. Roach (incumbent)	65,378	40.43
Total votes	161,715	100.0

==== District 6 ====
2006 Kentucky Supreme Court 6th district election
- District 6
Candidate	Wilfrid Schroder	Marcus Carey
Popular vote	84,467	46,666
Percentage	64.41%	35.59%
- County results Schroder: 50–60% 60–70% 70–80% Carey: 50–60%
Justice before election
Donald C. Wintersheimer
Elected Justice
Wilfrid Schroder

2006 Kentucky Supreme Court 6th district election
Candidate	Votes	%
Wilfrid Schroder	84,467	64.41
Marcus Carey	46,666	35.59
Total votes	131,133	100.0

=== Other judicial elections ===
All judges of the Kentucky Court of Appeals and the Kentucky Circuit Courts were elected in non-partisan elections to eight-year terms. All judges of the Kentucky District Courts were elected in non-partisan elections to four-year terms.

=== Commonwealth’s Attorneys ===
Commonwealth's Attorneys, who serve as the prosecutors for felonies in the state, are elected to six-year terms. One attorney is elected for each of the 57 circuits of the Kentucky Circuit Courts.

=== Circuit Clerks ===
Each county elected a Circuit Court Clerk to a six-year term.

== Local offices ==
=== County officers ===
All county officials were elected in partisan elections to four-year terms. The offices include the County Judge/Executive, the Fiscal Court (Magistrates and/or Commissioners), County Clerk, County Attorney, Jailer, Coroner, Surveyor, Property Value Administrator, Constables, and Sheriff.

=== Mayors ===
Mayors in Kentucky are elected to four-year terms, with cities holding their elections in either presidential or midterm years. Cities with elections in 2006 included those in Louisville and in Lexington.

=== City councils ===
Each incorporated city elected its council members to a two-year term.

=== School boards ===
Local school board members are elected to staggered four-year terms, with half up for election in 2006.

=== Louisville Metro Council ===
The Louisville Metro Council is elected to staggered four-year terms, with odd-numbered districts up for election in 2006.

== See also ==
- Elections in Kentucky
- Politics of Kentucky
- Political party strength in Kentucky
