= Walker Thomas =

American politician

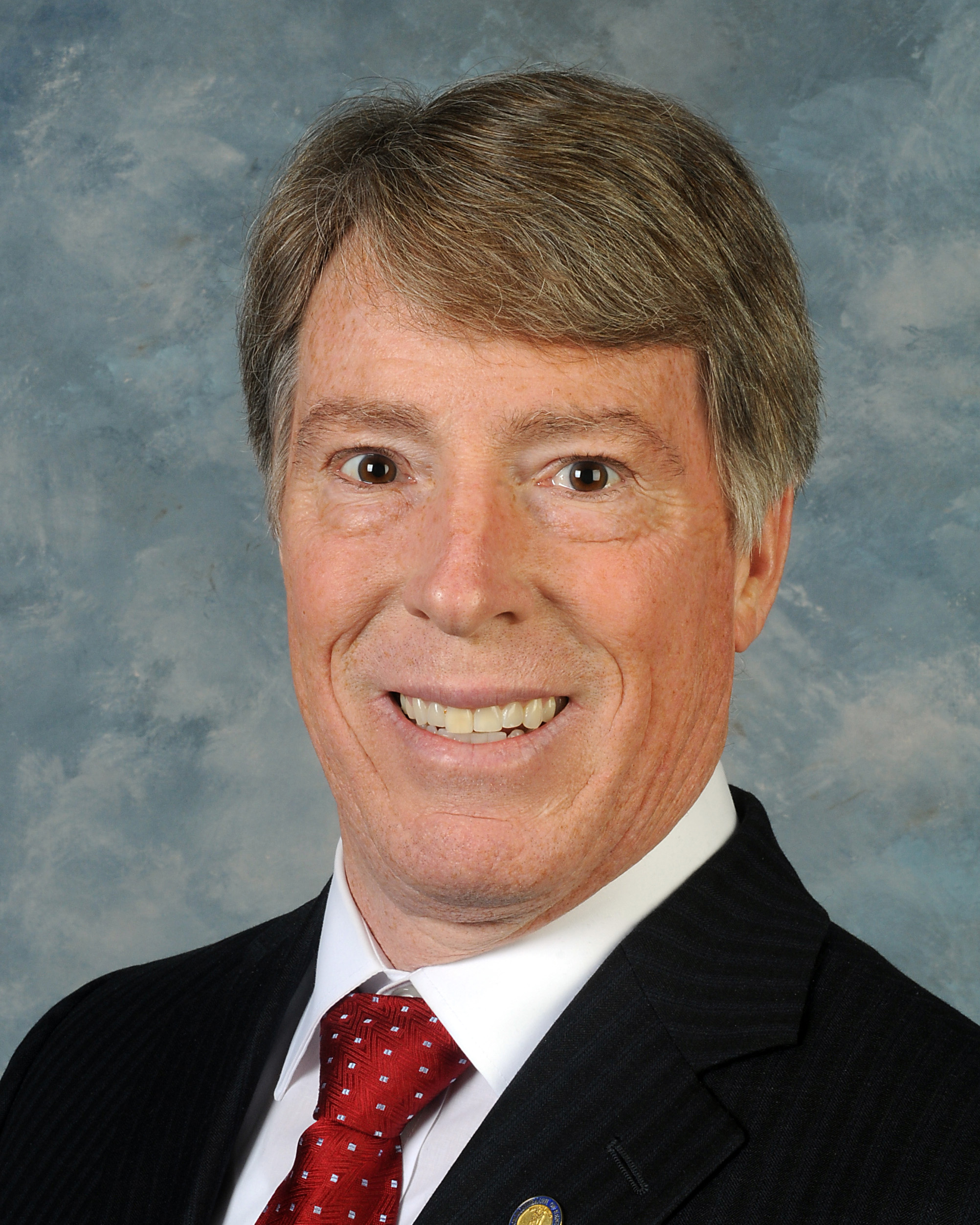
- Official portrait, 2016

Member of the Kentucky House of Representatives from the 8th district
- Incumbent
- Assumed office January 1, 2017
- Preceded by: Jeffery R. Taylor

Personal details
- Born: August 13, 1963 (age 62) Hopkinsville, Kentucky, U.S.
- Party: Republican
- Committees: Budget Review Subcommittee on Personnel, Public Retirement, & Finance (Chair); Agriculture; Appropriations and Revenue; Transportation; Veterans, Military Affairs, and Public Protection

Walker Wood Thomas (born August 13, 1963) is an American politician who has served as a Republican member of the Kentucky House of Representatives since January 2017. He represents Kentucky's 8th House district, which includes Caldwell County as well as part of Christian and Trigg counties. Thomas currently serves as chair of the House Standing Committee on Veterans, Military Affairs, and Public Protection.

== Biography ==
Thomas was born in Hopkinsville, Kentucky, and graduated from Austin Peay State University with a Bachelor of Business Administration.

Thomas has owned numerous business interests such as a family entertainment center and Kentucky Moving and Storage. He previously served a term on the Hopkinsville City Council as well as President of the Hopkinsville Rotary Club and Salvation Army.

== Political career ==
=== Elections ===
- 2016 (special) Kentucky's 8th House district incumbent John Tilley resigned following his appointment by Governor Matt Bevin as Secretary of the Kentucky Justice and Public Safety Cabinet. A special election was called and held on March 8, 2016. Walker was defeated by Democratic candidate Jeffery R. Taylor by a margin of 1,025 votes.
- 2016 (general) Walker was unopposed in the 2016 republican primary, and won the 2016 Kentucky House of Representatives election against incumbent Jeffery R. Taylor by a margin of 474 votes.
- 2018 Walker was unopposed in the 2018 republican primary, and won the 2018 Kentucky House of Representatives election against Democratic candidate Jeffery R. Taylor by a margin of 467 votes.
- 2020 Walker was unopposed in the 2020 republican primary, and won the 2020 Kentucky House of Representatives election against Democratic candidate Pam Dossett by a margin of 1,280 votes.
- 2022 Walker won the 2022 republican primary against challenger Larry Curling by a margin of 560 votes, and won the 2022 Kentucky House of Representatives election against Democratic candidate Pam Dossett by a margin of 5,096 votes.
- 2024 Walker was unopposed in the 2024 republican primary and the 2024 Kentucky House of Representatives election, winning the latter with 14,661 votes.
