= Jeffery R. Taylor =

American politician

Jeffery Taylor

Member of the Kentucky House of Representatives from the 8th district
- In office March 15, 2016 – January 1, 2017
- Preceded by: John Tilley
- Succeeded by: Walker Thomas

Personal details
- Born: August 30, 1959 (age 66)
- Party: Democratic

Jeffery Ray Taylor (born August 30, 1959) is an American politician from Kentucky who was a member of the Kentucky House of Representatives from March 2016 to January 2017. Taylor was elected in a March 2016 special election following the resignation of Democratic incumbent John Tilley to become Kentucky Secretary of Justice and Public Safety in the administration of Matt Bevin. He was defeated in November 2016 by Republican Walker Thomas in a rematch of the special election.
