= Scott Wells =

Scott Wells may refer to:

- Scott Wells (American football), American football player
- Scott Wells (politician), member of the Kentucky House of Representatives
- Scott James Wells, American actor and model
