= Bobby McCool (politician) =

American politician

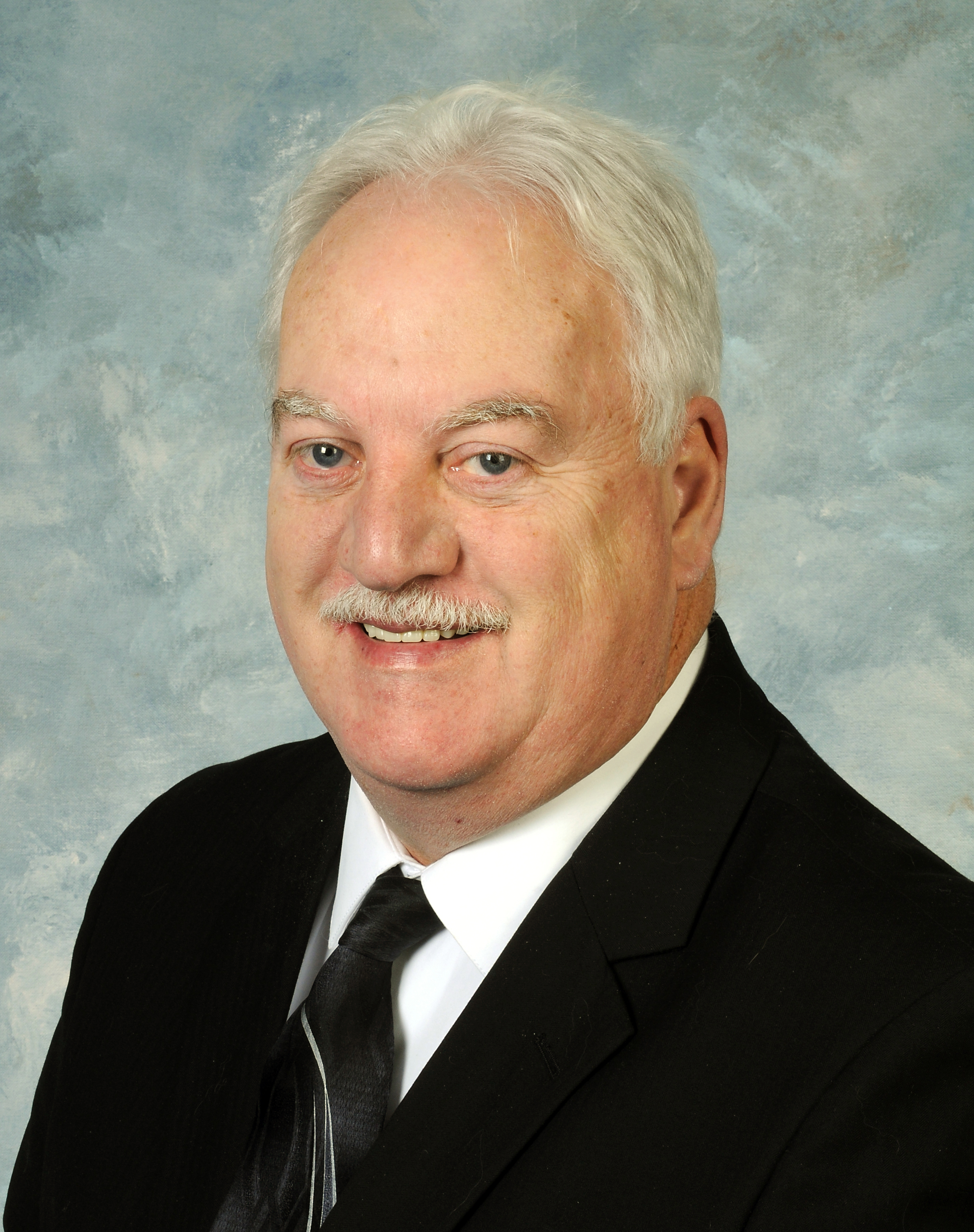

Member of the Kentucky House of Representatives from the 97th district
- Incumbent
- Assumed office January 1, 2019
- Preceded by: Scott Wells

Personal details
- Born: May 7, 1959 (age 67)
- Party: Republican
- Children: 2
- Education: Eastern Kentucky University (BA); Morehead State University (MA); Florida State University (PGS); University of Kentucky (ABD)
- Occupation: Educator (ret.)
- Committees: Veterans, Military Affairs, and Public Protection (Chair); Postsecondary Education; Transportation; Natural Resources & Energy

Military service
- Allegiance: United States
- Branch/service: United States Marine Corp, Air National Guard

Bobby Wayne McCool (born May 7, 1959) is an American politician who has served as a Republican member of the Kentucky House of Representatives since January 2019. His district consists of Johnson, Martin, and Pike counties.

== Background ==
McCool was raised in Letcher County, and after graduating high school chose to enter the workforce as a coal miner. Later, he was laid off from this position and enlisted in the United States Marine Corp. After receiving an honorable discharge, McCool attempted to return to Eastern Kentucky but was unable to find work, choosing instead to move to Lexington to further his education.

He earned a Bachelor of Arts in education from Eastern Kentucky University in 1991, a Master of Arts in education from Morehead State University, a postgraduate certificate in research from Florida State University, and has completed coursework towards a Doctor of Education Leadership degree at the University of Kentucky. During his education, McCool worked as a teacher at Rockcastle County High School as well as the food service industry.

After graduation, McCool was employed as a welding instructor by Mayo Technical College (now Big Sandy Community and Technical College) in Paintsville. He would remain at BCTCS for over 27 years, serving as one of the first members of the Kentucky Community and Technical College System Board of Regents, Director of the Mayo campus, and finally as a vice president and Chief Institutional Office of BCTCS. During this period, McCool was also a member of the Paintsville/ Johnson County Chamber of Commerce Board of Directors and governing board of the Kentucky Historical Society. Following retirement, he returned to BCTCS in 2017 after being appointed to the college's Board of Directors by Governor Matt Bevin.

== Political career ==
=== Elections ===
- 2012 McCool was unopposed in the 2012 Republican primary for Kentucky's 97th House district but was defeated in the 2012 Kentucky House of Representatives election by Democratic incumbent Hubert Collins. McCool garnered 5,763 votes (41%).
- 2014 McCool won the 2014 Republican primary with 1,610 votes (46.2%) but was defeated in the 2014 Kentucky House of Representatives election by Democratic incumbent Hubert Collins. McCool garnered 5,199 votes (36.8%).
- 2018 Kentucky's 97th House district incumbent Scott Wells chose not to seek reelection. McCool won the 2018 Republican primary with 1,949 votes (52.4%) and won the 2018 Kentucky House of Representatives election with 8,514 votes (57.8%) against Democratic candidate Craig Lindon.
- 2020 McCool was unopposed in the 2020 Republican primary and won the 2020 Kentucky House of Representatives election with 14,459 votes (78.5%) against Democratic candidate Will Hurst.
- 2022 McCool won the 2022 Republican primary with 4,244 votes (60.4%) against Norma Kirk-McCormick, who was the incumbent representative of Kentucky's 93rd House district who had been redistricted following the enactment of the 2022 Kentucky redistricting map. McCool was unopposed in the 2022 Kentucky House of Representatives election, winning with 9,395 votes.
- 2024 McCool was unopposed in both the 2024 Republican primary and the 2024 Kentucky House of Representatives election, winning the latter with 14,907 votes.
