= Wesley Morgan =

Wesley Morgan may refer to:

- Wes Morgan, Jamaican footballer
- Wesley Morgan (actor), Canadian actor and model
- C. Wesley Morgan, American businessman and politician
