= Kentucky's 8th House of Representatives district =

American legislative district

Kentucky's 8th State House of Representatives district
Representative
Walker Thomas; R–Hopkinsville
since January 1, 2017
- Registration: 46.7% Democratic; 43.6% Republican; 9.1% No party preference
- Demographics: 75.6% White; 16.3% Black; 2.8% Hispanic; 0.2% Asian; 0.1% Native American; 0.4% Other; 4.6% Multiracial
- Population (2023): 46,279
- Registered voters (2025): 35,424

Kentucky's 8th House of Representatives district is one of 100 districts in the Kentucky House of Representatives. Located in the western part of the state, it comprises Caldwell County and parts of Christian and Trigg Counties. It has been represented by Walker Thomas (R–Hopkinsville) since 2017. As of 2023, the district had a population of 46,279.

== Voter registration ==
On January 1, 2025, the district had 35,424 registered voters, who were registered with the following parties.

Party	Registration	
Party	Voters	%
Democratic	16,553	46.73
Republican	15,459	43.64
Independent	1,333	3.76
Libertarian	142	0.40
Constitution	21	0.06
Green	20	0.06
Socialist Workers	3	0.01
Reform	0	0.00
"Other"	1,893	5.34
Total	35,424	100.00
Source: Kentucky State Board of Elections

== List of members representing the district ==
Member	Party	Years	Electoral history	District location
Ed Whitfield (Hopkinsville)	Democratic	January 1, 1974 – January 1, 1976	Elected in 1973. Retired.	1974–1985; Christian (part) and Trigg (part) Counties.
Ramsey Morris (Hopkinsville)	Democratic	January 1, 1976 – January 1, 1997	Elected in 1975. Reelected in 1977. Reelected in 1979. Reelected in 1981. Reelected in 1984. Reelected in 1986. Reelected in 1988. Reelected in 1990. Reelected in 1992. Reelected in 1994. Retired to run for Kentucky's; 1st congressional district.	1974–1985; Christian (part) and Trigg (part) Counties.
Ramsey Morris (Hopkinsville)	Democratic	January 1, 1976 – January 1, 1997	Elected in 1975. Reelected in 1977. Reelected in 1979. Reelected in 1981. Reelected in 1984. Reelected in 1986. Reelected in 1988. Reelected in 1990. Reelected in 1992. Reelected in 1994. Retired to run for Kentucky's; 1st congressional district.	1985–1993; Christian (part) and Trigg (part) Counties.
Ramsey Morris (Hopkinsville)	Democratic	January 1, 1976 – January 1, 1997	Elected in 1975. Reelected in 1977. Reelected in 1979. Reelected in 1981. Reelected in 1984. Reelected in 1986. Reelected in 1988. Reelected in 1990. Reelected in 1992. Reelected in 1994. Retired to run for Kentucky's; 1st congressional district.	1993–1997; Christian (part) and Trigg (part) Counties.
John W. Adams (Hopkinsville)	Democratic	January 1, 1997 – January 1, 2005	Elected in 1996. Reelected in 1998. Reelected in 2000. Reelected in 2002. Lost renomination.	1997–2003
John W. Adams (Hopkinsville)	Democratic	January 1, 1997 – January 1, 2005	Elected in 1996. Reelected in 1998. Reelected in 2000. Reelected in 2002. Lost renomination.	2003–2015
James R. Carr (Hopkinsville)	Democratic	January 1, 2005 – October 3, 2005	Elected in 2004. Lost reelection.	2003–2015
James R. Carr (Hopkinsville)	Republican	October 3, 2005 – January 1, 2007	Elected in 2004. Lost reelection.	2003–2015
John Tilley (Hopkinsville)	Democratic	January 1, 2007 – December 21, 2015	Elected in 2006. Reelected in 2008. Reelected in 2010. Reelected in 2012. Reelected in 2014. Resigned to become Secretary of the Kentucky Justice and Public Safety Cabinet.	2003–2015
John Tilley (Hopkinsville)	Democratic	January 1, 2007 – December 21, 2015	Elected in 2006. Reelected in 2008. Reelected in 2010. Reelected in 2012. Reelected in 2014. Resigned to become Secretary of the Kentucky Justice and Public Safety Cabinet.	2015–2023
Jeffery R. Taylor (Hopkinsville)	Democratic	March 15, 2016 – January 1, 2017	Elected to finish Tilley's term. Lost reelection.	2015–2023
Walker Thomas (Hopkinsville)	Republican	January 1, 2017 – present	Elected in 2016. Reelected in 2018. Reelected in 2020. Reelected in 2022. Reelected in 2024. Reelected in 2026.	2015–2023
Walker Thomas (Hopkinsville)	Republican	January 1, 2017 – present	Elected in 2016. Reelected in 2018. Reelected in 2020. Reelected in 2022. Reelected in 2024. Reelected in 2026.	2023–present
