= Electricity Security and Affordability Act =

- Long title: To provide direction to the Administrator of the Environmental Protection Agency regarding the establishment of standards for emissions of any greenhouse gas from fossil fuel-fired electric utility generating units, and for other purposes.
- Announced in: the 113th United States Congress
- Sponsored by: Rep. Ed Whitfield (R, KY-1)
- Number of co-sponsors: 59

Codification
- Acts affected: Clean Air Act
- U.S.C. sections affected: 42 U.S.C. § 7411
- Agencies affected: United States Congress, United States Environmental Protection Agency

Legislative history
- Introduced in the House as H.R. 3826 by Rep. Ed Whitfield (R, KY-1) on January 9, 2014; Committee consideration by United States House Committee on Energy and Commerce, United States House Energy Subcommittee on Energy and Power; Passed the House on March 6, 2014 (229-183)

The Electricity Security and Affordability Act (H.R. 3826) is a bill that would repeal a pending rule published by the Environmental Protection Agency (EPA) on January 8, 2014. The proposed rule would establish uniform national limits on greenhouse gas (GHG) emissions from new electricity-generating facilities that use coal or natural gas. The rule also sets new standards of performance for those power plants, including the requirement to install carbon capture and sequestration technology.

The bill passed in the United States House of Representatives during the 113th United States Congress.

== Provisions of the bill ==
This summary is based largely on the summary provided by the Congressional Research Service, a public domain source.

The Electricity Security and Affordability Act would prohibit the Administrator of the Environmental Protection Agency (EPA) from issuing, implementing, or enforcing any proposed or final rule under the Clean Air Act that establishes a performance standard for greenhouse gas emissions from any new source that is a fossil fuel-fired electric utility generating unit unless the rule meets specified requirements of this Act.

The bill would require the Administrator to separate sources fueled with coal and natural gas into separate categories.

The bill would prohibit the Administrator, however, from setting a standard based on the best system of emission reduction for new sources within the coal category unless it has been achieved on average for at least one continuous 12-month period (excluding planned outages) by each of at least 6 units within the category. Requires each such unit to: (1) be located at a different electric generating station in the United States, (2) be representative of the operating characteristics of electric generation at its location, and (3) be operated for the entire 12-month period on a full commercial basis. Prohibits the use of any results obtained from a demonstration project in setting the standard.

The bill would require the Administrator, in separating sources fueled with coal into a separate category, to establish a separate subcategory for new sources that are fossil fuel-fired electric utility generating units using coal with an average heat content of 8300 or less British Thermal Units (BTUs) per pound.

The bill would prohibit the Administrator, in issuing any rule establishing performance standards for greenhouse gas emissions from new sources in such subcategory, from setting a standard based on the best system of emission reduction unless the standard has been achieved on average for at least one continuous 12-month period (excluding planned outages) by each of at least 3 units within such subcategory that meets the unit requirements specified by this Act for the coal category.

The bill would preclude from taking effect, unless a federal law is enacted specifying an effective date, any EPA rule or guideline that: (1) establishes any performance standard for greenhouse gas emissions from a modified or reconstructed source that is a fossil fuel-fired electric utility generating unit, or (2) applies to greenhouse gas emissions from such an existing source.

The bill would nullify the force and effect of specified proposed rules (or similar successor proposed or final rules) for Standards of Performance for Greenhouse Gas Emissions for New Stationary Sources: Electric Utility Generating Units that are issued before enactment of this Act. ↔

== Congressional Budget Office report ==
This summary is based largely on the summary provided by the Congressional Budget Office, as ordered reported by the House Committee on Energy and Commerce on January 28, 2014. This is a public domain source.

On January 8, 2014, the Environmental Protection Agency (EPA) published a proposed rule that would establish uniform national limits on greenhouse gas (GHG) emissions from new electricity-generating facilities that use coal or natural gas. The rule also sets new standards of performance for those power plants, including the requirement to install carbon capture and sequestration technology. H.R. 3826 would repeal this pending rule and place new requirements on any future regulations addressing GHG emissions from new or existing power plants.

The Congressional Budget Office (CBO) estimates that implementing this legislation would cost $2 million over the 2015-2019 period, subject to the availability of appropriated funds. Enacting H.R. 3826 would not affect direct spending or revenues; therefore, pay-as-you-go procedures do not apply.

H.R. 3826 contains no intergovernmental or private-sector mandates as defined in the Unfunded Mandates Reform Act and would not affect the budgets of state, local, or tribal governments.

== Procedural history ==
The Electricity Security and Affordability Act was introduced into the United States House of Representatives on January 9, 2014, by Rep. Ed Whitfield (R, KY-1). It was referred to the United States House Committee on Energy and Commerce and the United States House Energy Subcommittee on Energy and Power. It was reported by the committee on February 28, 2014, alongside House Report 113-365. On February 29, 2014, House Majority Leader Eric Cantor announced that H.R. 3826 would be considered on March 5, 2014. The bill passed the House on March 6, 2014, in a vote of 229–183.

== Debate and discussion ==
Republicans thought the bill was needed to stop the EPA from implementing a rule that would force new coal-fired power plants to meet an impossible emissions standard. Bill sponsor Ed Whitfield (R-KY) said that, if finalized, the EPA's rule would "make it impossible to build a new coal-powered plant in American... That is hard to believe that that will can be the situation in our great country, particularly since 40 percent of our electricity comes from coal." Whitfield argued that the legislation was needed because the EPA refused to respond to criticism or complaints about their proposed rule. Republicans also criticized the EPA's proposed rule, suggesting that it could raise electricity prices by up to $1,200 per household.

The activist group FreedomWorks supported the bill and asked its members to contact their representatives about it. In a blog post FreedomWorks president Matt Kibbe said that the bill would go a "long way in curbing the Environmental Protection Agency’s (EPA) radical war on affordable and reliable energy from fossil fuels." Kibbe argued that the EPA's proposed rule was "an obvious backdoor attempt to effectively outlaw coal" because the standards were set "well below the emissions levels achieved by even the most advanced coal facilities."

The bill was also supported by Grover Norquist of Americans for Tax Reform. Norquist said "Congress never intended for the EPA to unilaterally determine what source of energy Americans consume. The Electricity Security and Affordability Act also reaffirms Congress's legislative duties by enacting numerous safeguards against EPA partisan overreach."

Most Democrats opposed the bill, arguing that it was meant to derail efforts to reduce carbon emissions. Rep. Henry Waxman (D-CA) said that "If we pass this terrible bill, we will vote to let China leap ahead of us in the race to build the clean energy economy for the future, and we will be ignoring our moral obligation to protect the planet for our children and grandchildren."

President Barack Obama said that he would veto the bill. Rep. John Dingell (D-MI) did not believe that the bill would pass the Senate, so "we are wasting the time of the American people."

== See also ==
- List of bills in the 113th United States Congress
- Energy in the United States
- Electricity sector of the United States
- Energy policy of the United States
- United States energy independence
- Coal power in the United States
