= Phillip Childers =

American politician

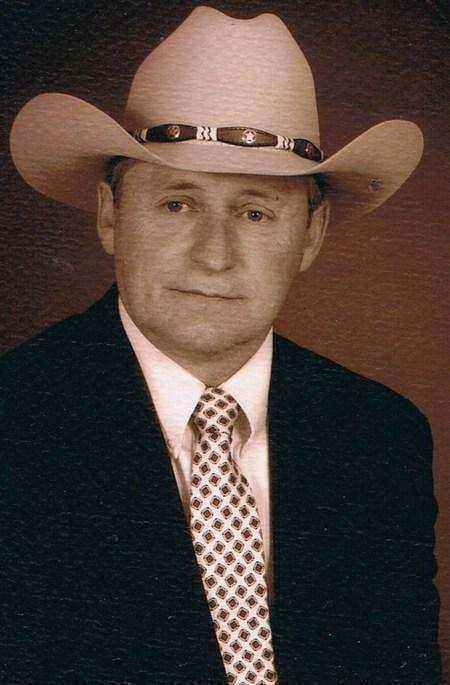
- Official portrait, 2002

Member of the Kentucky House of Representatives from the 92nd district
- In office January 1, 1999 – January 1, 2003
- Preceded by: Donnie Newsome
- Succeeded by: Ancel Smith

Personal details
- Born: October 26, 1951 Lackey, Kentucky, U.S.
- Died: December 18, 2010 (aged 59) Hazard, Kentucky, U.S.
- Party: Democratic
- Spouse: Donna Walton
- Children: 2

Phillip Alvin Childers (October 26, 1951 – December 18, 2010) was an American politician who served as a member of the Kentucky House of Representatives from 1999 to 2003. He was a member of the Democratic Party.

== Early life and education ==
Phillip Alvin Childers was born on October 26, 1951, in Lackey, Kentucky.

== Kentucky House of Representatives (1999–2003) ==
After incumbent Donnie Newsome retired to run for Judge/Executive of Knott County, Childers was elected to the Kentucky House of Representatives in 1998. He was defeated for renomination by Ancel Smith in 2002, who had unsuccessfully challenged him in 2000.

== Personal life and death ==
Childers was married to Donna Walton; they had two children. He was a patrilineal descendent of Kentucky pioneer Abraham Childers.

Childers died on December 18, 2010, at age 59, in Hazard, Kentucky.
