= Donnie Newsome =

American politician

Judge/Executive of Knott County
- In office January 4, 1999 – September 30, 2005
- Preceded by: Homer Sawyer
- Succeeded by: Randy Thompson

Member of the Kentucky House of Representatives from the 92nd district
- In office January 1, 1995 – January 1, 1999
- Preceded by: Russell Bentley
- Succeeded by: Phillip Childers

Personal details
- Party: Democratic

Donnie Newsome (born 1950) is an American politician from Kentucky who was the Judge/Executive of Knott County from 1999 to 2005 and a member of the Kentucky House of Representatives from 1995 to 1999. Newsome was first elected to the house in 1994, defeating incumbent representative Russell Bentley for renomination.

In 1998 he ran for Judge/Executive of Knott County, defeating Democratic incumbent Homer Sawyer for renomination. In October 2003 he was convicted on federal voter fraud charges. He remained in office for the entirety of his 16-month prison sentence due to a provision of the Kentucky Constitution that allows convicted officeholders to remain in office until the appeals process is complete. He resigned from office in September 2005. He ran again for the office in 2010, losing the Democratic primary to Ronnie Watts.
