= John Short (Kentucky politician) =

American politician

Member of the Kentucky House of Representatives from the 92nd district
- In office January 1, 2011 – January 1, 2017
- Preceded by: Ancel Smith
- Succeeded by: John Blanton

Personal details
- Born: August 24, 1964 (age 61)
- Party: Democratic

John W. Short (born August 24, 1964) is an American politician and former Democratic member of the Kentucky House of Representatives who represented district 92 from 2011 to 2017. He was defeated for reelection in 2016 by Republican John Blanton.

== Elections ==
- 2012 Short was challenged in the May 22, 2012 Democratic Primary, winning with 3,934 votes (75.9%) and was unopposed for the November 6, 2012 General election, winning with 9,807 votes.
- 2010 Short challenged District 92 incumbent Representative Ancel Smith in the May 18, 2010, Democratic Primary, winning with 6,474 votes (52.3%) and won the November 2, 2010 General election with 10,149 votes (72.7%) against Republican nominee Ruby Couch.
