= Kerry B. Harvey =

American attorney

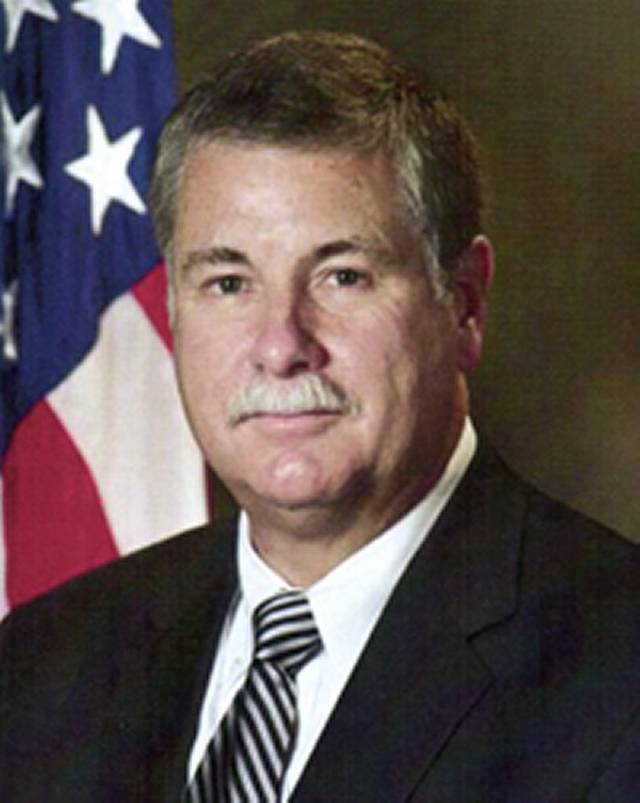

Secretary of the Kentucky Justice and Public Safety Cabinet
- In office August 2, 2021 – February 1, 2024
- Governor: Andy Beshear
- Preceded by: Mary C. Noble
- Succeeded by: Keith Jackson

Secretary of the Kentucky Public Protection Cabinet
- In office December 10, 2019 – August 2, 2021
- Governor: Andy Beshear
- Preceded by: Gail Russell
- Succeeded by: Ray Perry

United States Attorney for the Eastern District of Kentucky
- In office May 14, 2010 – January 13, 2017
- President: Barack Obama
- Preceded by: James A. Zerhusen (acting)
- Succeeded by: Robert M. Duncan Jr.

Personal details
- Born: February 26, 1957 (age 68)
- Party: Democratic
- Education: Murray State University; University of Kentucky College of Law J.D.

Kerry B. Harvey (born February 26, 1957) is an American attorney who served as the United States Attorney for the Eastern District of Kentucky from 2010 to 2017. He was secretary of the Kentucky Justice and Public Safety Cabinet from 2021 to 2024.
