= Larry Brandstetter =

American politician

Member of the Kentucky House of Representatives from the 79th district
- In office January 1, 1995 – January 1, 1999
- Preceded by: Bill Lear
- Succeeded by: Susan Westrom

Personal details
- Party: Republican

Lawrence W. Brandstetter (born 1949) is an American politician from Kentucky who was a member of the Kentucky House of Representatives from 1995 to 1999. Brandstetter was first elected in 1994 after incumbent representative Bill Lear retired. He was defeated for reelection in 1998 by Democrat Susan Westrom.
