= Russell Bentley (politician) =

American politician

Member of the Kentucky House of Representatives from the 92nd district
- In office January 1, 1989 – January 1, 1995
- Preceded by: Sidney Adams
- Succeeded by: Donnie Newsome

Personal details
- Born: 1946 (age 79–80)
- Party: Democratic

Russell Bentley (born 1946) is an American politician from Kentucky who was a member of the Kentucky House of Representatives from 1989 to 1995. Bentley was first elected in 1988 after incumbent representative Sidney Adams retired. He was defeated for renomination in 1994 by Donnie Newsome.
