= Ancel Smith =

American politician

Member of the Kentucky House of Representatives from the 92nd district
- In office January 1, 2003 – January 1, 2011
- Preceded by: Phillip Childers
- Succeeded by: John Short

Personal details
- Born: February 9, 1946 (age 80)
- Party: Democratic

Ancel "Hard Rock" Smith (born February 9, 1946) is an American politician from Kentucky who served in the Kentucky House of Representatives from 2003 to 2011. Smith was first elected in 2002 after defeating incumbent representative Phillip Childers in the May primary election. He had previously challenged Childers in 2000, losing by six percent. He was defeated for renomination in 2010 by John Short.
