= Rita Smart =

American politician (born 1948)

Member of the Kentucky House of Representatives from the 81st district
- In office January 1, 2011 – January 1, 2017
- Preceded by: Harry Moberly
- Succeeded by: C. Wesley Morgan

Personal details
- Born: November 13, 1948 (age 77) Jessamine County, Kentucky
- Party: Democratic
- Spouse: Richard Smart
- Education: Eastern Kentucky University; University of Kentucky
- Website: www.bennetthousebb.com

Rita H. Smart (born November 13, 1948, in Jessamine County, Kentucky) is an American politician and a former Democratic member of the Kentucky House of Representatives who represented district 81 from 2011 to 2016. She was unseated by C. Wesley Morgan of Richmond in 2016.

== Education ==
Smart earned her BS from Eastern Kentucky University and her MS from the University of Kentucky.

== Elections ==
- 2012 Smart was unopposed for the May 22, 2012 Democratic Primary and won the November 6, 2012 General election with 10,263 votes (61.4%) against Republican nominee Mary Long.
- 2010 When District 81 Representative Harry Moberly retired and left the seat open, Smart won the May 18, 2010 Democratic Primary with 3,304 votes (59.1%) and won the November 2, 2010 General election with 6,778 votes (55.8%) against Republican nominee Tiffany Nash.
