= Tom McKee =

American politician

Member of the Kentucky House of Representatives from the 78th district
- In office January 1, 1997 – January 1, 2017
- Preceded by: Ernie Fletcher (redistricting)
- Succeeded by: Mark Hart

Personal details
- Born: March 13, 1941 (age 85) Cynthiana, Kentucky, U.S.
- Party: Democratic
- Spouse: Sue McKee

Thomas M. McKee (born March 13, 1941) is an American politician and farmer who served as a member of the Kentucky House of Representatives for the 78th district from 1997 to 2017. He was defeated for reelection in 2016 by Republican Mark Hart.

== Career ==
McKee, a tobacco farmer and resident of Cynthiana, Kentucky, was first elected to the house seat in 1996. His district includes Harrison, Pendleton and Robertson counties and part of Campbell County, Kentucky.

In 1996, when state house district lines were redrawn, McKee ran in his new district. He collected 54 percent of the vote, according to The Kentucky Enquirer. He faced no opponent in 1998.

In 2004, he faced a challenge from Roger Sullivan, a Falmouth, Kentucky Republican, and won by collecting approximately 57 percent of the vote, according to The Campbell County Recorder. During his tenure in the House, McKee served as chair of the House Agriculture Committee.
