= Ramsey Morris =

American politician

Member of the Kentucky House of Representatives from the 8th district
- In office January 1, 1976 – January 1, 1997
- Preceded by: Ed Whitfield
- Succeeded by: John W. Adams

Personal details
- Born: November 7, 1940 (age 85)
- Party: Democratic

Henry Ramsey Morris Jr. (born November 7, 1940) is an American politician from Kentucky who was a member of the Kentucky House of Representatives from 1976 to 1997. Morris was first elected in 1975 after incumbent Democratic representative Ed Whitfield retired. In 1996 Morris ran for Kentucky's 1st congressional district to defeat Whitfield, who had been elected to congress as a Republican in 1994. Morris was defeated for the Democratic nomination by Dennis Null.
