= James R. Carr =

American politician

James Carr

Member of the Kentucky House of Representatives from the 8th district
- In office January 1, 2005 – January 1, 2007
- Preceded by: John W. Adams
- Succeeded by: John Tilley

Personal details
- Born: 1964 (age 61–62)
- Party: Republican (since 2005)
- Other political affiliations: Democratic (before 2005)

James R. Carr (born 1964) is an American politician from Kentucky who was a member of the Kentucky House of Representatives from 2005 to 2007. Carr was first elected in 2004, defeating incumbent representative John W. Adams in the Democratic primary election. Carr switched to the Republican party in October 2005 and was defeated for reelection by Democrat John Tilley.
