= Mary C. Noble =

American judge (born 1949)

Secretary of the Kentucky Justice and Public Safety Cabinet
- In office December 10, 2019 – July 15, 2021
- Governor: Andy Beshear
- Preceded by: John Tilley
- Succeeded by: Kerry B. Harvey

Justice of the Kentucky Supreme Court
- In office November 27, 2006 – January 2, 2017
- Preceded by: John C. Roach
- Succeeded by: Laurance B. VanMeter

Judge of the 22nd Kentucky Circuit Court
- In office January 6, 1992 – November 27, 2006
- Preceded by: Charles Tackett
- Succeeded by: Lucinda Masterton

Personal details
- Born: March 21, 1949 (age 77) Jackson, Kentucky, U.S.
- Education: Austin Peay State University; University of Kentucky

Mary C. Noble (born March 21, 1949) is the former Secretary of the Kentucky Justice and Public Safety Cabinet and a former Deputy Chief Justice of the Kentucky Supreme Court. Noble was elected to the court in November 2006 where she represented the 5th Supreme Court District. She defeated appointed Justice John C. Roach. Prior to that election, she served as a circuit judge in Fayette County. Chief Justice John D. Minton Jr. named Noble Deputy Chief Justice on September 1, 2010. Prior to her election to the Supreme Court, Noble was elected to the Fayette Fifth Circuit Court in 1991, and she was re-elected in 2000. Noble retired from the bench in 2017.

In December 2019, Governor Andy Beshear appointed Noble to the position of Secretary of the Kentucky Justice and Public Safety Cabinet. In this capacity as secretary, she oversees more than 7,000 employees and five major departments, including Corrections, Criminal Justice Training, Public Advocacy, Juvenile Justice, and the Kentucky State Police. The office also oversees the State Medical Examiner and the Office of Drug Control Policy.

Noble received a B.S. in English and sociology from Austin Peay State University in 1971, an M.A. in psychology from Austin Peay State University in 1975 and a J.D. from the University of Kentucky in 1981.
