= Bill Lear (politician) =

American politician

Member of the Kentucky House of Representatives from the 79th district
- In office January 1, 1985 – January 1, 1995
- Preceded by: Hank List
- Succeeded by: Larry Brandstetter

Personal details
- Party: Democratic

William Marvin Lear Jr. (born June 26, 1950) is an American politician from Kentucky who was a member of the Kentucky House of Representatives from 1985 to 1995. Lear was first elected in 1984 after incumbent representative Hank List retired. He did not seek reelection in 1994 and was succeeded by Republican Larry Brandstetter.
