= Harry Moberly =

American politician

Member of the Kentucky House of Representatives from the 81st district
- In office January 1, 1980 – January 1, 2011
- Preceded by: Dwight Wells
- Succeeded by: Rita Smart

Personal details
- Party: Democratic

Harry Moberly Jr. (born September 2, 1950) is an American politician from Kentucky who was a member of the Kentucky House of Representatives from 1980 to 2011. Moberly was first elected to the house in 1979 after defeating incumbent representative Dwight Wells in the May primary election. He did not seek reelection in 2010 and was succeeded by Rita Smart.
