= John W. Adams (Kentucky politician) =

American politician

John Adams

Member of the Kentucky House of Representatives from the 8th district
- In office January 1, 1997 – January 1, 2005
- Preceded by: Ramsey Morris
- Succeeded by: James R. Carr

Personal details
- Born: June 29, 1936
- Died: August 18, 2011 (aged 75)
- Party: Democratic

John William Adams (June 29, 1936 – August 18, 2011) was an American politician from Kentucky who was a member of the Kentucky House of Representatives from 1997 to 2005. Adams was first elected in 1996 when incumbent representative Ramsey Morris retired to run for Kentucky's 1st congressional district. Adams was defeated for renomination by James R. Carr in 2004.

Adams died on August 18, 2011.
