= Mark Hart (politician) =

American politician, paramedic, and firefighter

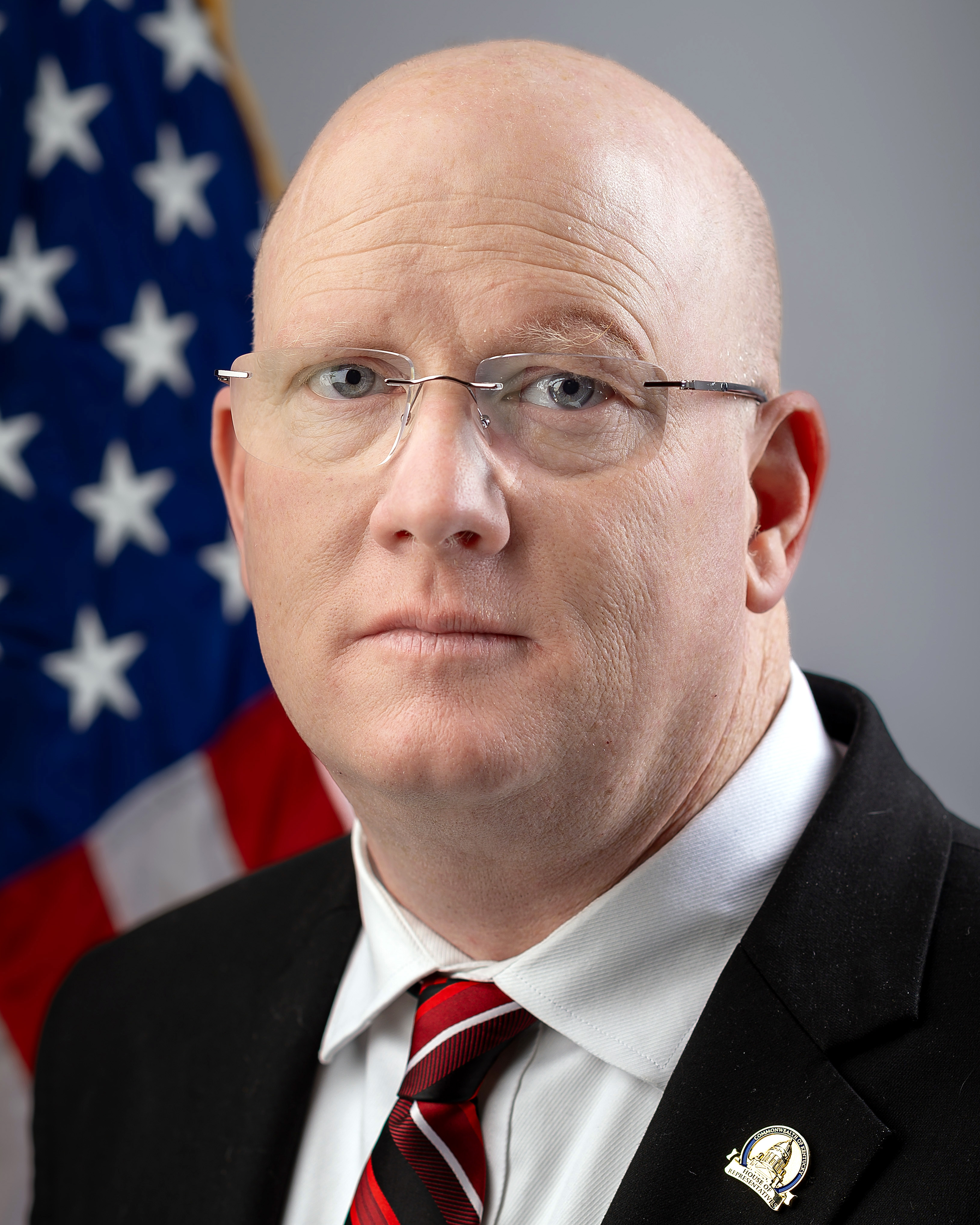

Member of the Kentucky House of Representatives from the 78th district
- Incumbent
- Assumed office January 1, 2017
- Preceded by: Tom McKee

Personal details
- Born: December 9, 1968 (age 57)
- Party: Republican
- Education: Northern Kentucky University (BS)
- Committees: Agriculture; Appropriations & Revenue; Local Government; Veterans, Military Affairs, & Public Protection

Military service
- Branch/service: United States Army
- Years of service: 1994–2003
- Unit: Kentucky Army National Guard

Mark Allen Hart (born December 9, 1968) is an American politician serving as a Republican member of the Kentucky House of Representatives from Kentucky's 78th House district. His district includes Pendleton County as well as parts of Boone, Campbell, and Kenton counties. Elected in November 2016, he assumed office in January 2017.

== Background ==
Hart was born in December 1968, and graduated from Pendleton County Memorial High School. He went on to earn a Bachelor of Science degree in biology with a minor in psychology from Northern Kentucky University. Hart was a member of the Boy Scouts of America, and achieved the rank of Eagle Scout.

In 1995, Hart began his career as a biological science research assistant for the Centers for Disease Control and Prevention. From 1993 to 1996, he worked as a substitute teacher for the Pendleton County Schools, and from 1996 to 1999 Hart was a blood bank technician at the Hoxworth Blood Center. From 1994 to 2003, Hart served as an artilleryman and medic in the Kentucky Army National Guard. He later served as a lieutenant in the Lexington Fire Department. He also worked for the Cynthiana/Harrison County Emergency Management Agency and served as a captain for the Pendleton County Emergency Medical Service.

== Political career ==
=== Elections ===
- 2016 Hart was unopposed in the 2016 Republican primary and won the 2016 Kentucky House of Representatives election with 9,035 votes (54.4%) against Democratic incumbent Tom McKee of Kentucky's 78th House district.
- 2018 Hart was unopposed in the 2018 Republican primary and won the 2018 Kentucky House of Representatives election with 8,192 votes (59.5%) against Democratic candidate Gregory Coulson.
- 2020 Hart was unopposed in the 2020 Republican primary and won the 2020 Kentucky House of Representatives election with 14,392 votes (83.1%) against Libertarian candidate James Toller.
- 2022 Hart was unopposed in both the 2022 Republican primary and 2022 Kentucky House of Representatives election, winning the latter with 12,262 votes.
- 2024 Hart was unopposed in the 2024 Republican primary and won the 2024 Kentucky House of Representatives election with 17,024 votes (81.9%) against independent candidate Timothy Johnson.
