= Scott Wells (politician) =

American politician

Member of the Kentucky House of Representatives from the 97th district
- In office January 1, 2017 – January 1, 2019
- Preceded by: Hubert Collins
- Succeeded by: Bobby McCool

Personal details
- Party: Republican

William "Scott" Wells is an American politician from Kentucky who was a member of the Kentucky House of Representatives from 2017 to 2019. Wells was first elected in 2016, defeating Democratic incumbent Hubert Collins. He did not seek reelection in 2018 and was succeeded by Bobby McCool.
