= Hubert Collins =

American politician

Member of the Kentucky House of Representatives from the 97th district
- In office January 1, 1991 – January 1, 2017
- Preceded by: Ray Preston
- Succeeded by: Scott Wells

Personal details
- Born: August 19, 1936 Wittensville, Kentucky, U.S.
- Died: April 21, 2023 (aged 86)
- Party: Democratic

Hubert Collins (August 19, 1936 – April 21, 2023) was an American politician from Kentucky, who represented the 97th district in the Kentucky House of Representatives from 1991 to 2017. He was first elected to the house in 1990, defeating Republican Tom Hardin who had defeated incumbent Ray Preston for renomination. A former teacher, auctioneer, car dealer and broker, Collins attended Morehead State University. He was defeated for reelection in 2016 by Scott Wells.

Collins died in April 2023.
