= Susan Westrom =

American social worker and politician (born 1952)

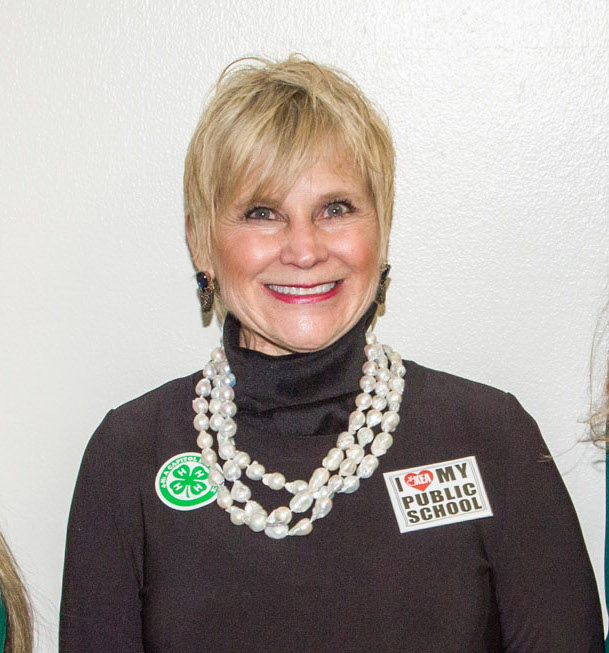
- Westrom in 2018
- Born: May 15, 1952 (age 74); Iowa, United States
- Other name: Susan Westrom-Becknell
- Education: BSW & MSW, U. of Kentucky
- Occupations: Real estate agent; child advocate; politician
- Political party: Democratic

Member of the Kentucky House of Representatives from the 79th district
- In office 1999–2022
- Governor: Paul E. Patton; Ernie Fletcher; Steve Beshear; Matt Bevin; Andy Beshear
- Preceded by: Larry Brandstetter
- Succeeded by: Chad Aull

Signature
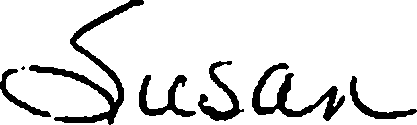

Susan Westrom (born May 15, 1952) is an American real estate agent, social worker, and politician who served in the Kentucky House of Representatives from 1999 to 2022.

== Personal life ==
Born in Iowa on May 15, 1952, by the mid-1980s Susan Westrom was a single parent of two children. After attending Lexington Community College at age 32, Westrom received a bachelor's (1993) and master's degree (1995) in social work from the University of Kentucky.

== Career ==
Before entering politics, Westrom was the director of advocacy and marketing for the Buckhorn Children's Home as well as a real estate agent with Keller Williams Bluegrass. By the mid-1990s, Westrom was a social worker and led the Lexington, Kentucky chapter of the Association for Children for the Enforcement of Support; on May 20, 1994, she led a rally and candlelight vigil on the local courthouse steps. By November 1998, she was working as a child advocate for the Buckhorn Foundation.

=== Politics ===
In the 1998 election, Westrom was first elected to represent District 79 in the Kentucky House of Representatives, defeating Republican incumbent Larry Brandstetter. In the 2016 Kentucky House of Representatives election for District 79, Westrom defeated Ken Kearns with 59.4% of the 20,064 votes cast (11,909 to 8,155). She won the 2020 Kentucky House of Representatives election for her district, defeating Jon Larson, who conceded the race in-person at Westrom's Lexington home. In June 2021, the Democratic representative was on ten legislative committees.

In the Kentucky legislature, Westrom worked towards removing juveniles from adult prisons, promoting the equine industry in Kentucky, facilitating families' access to Kentucky Housing Corporation benefits, and improving electric utility accountability.

After no Republicans filed to run against her, and being comfortable with her likely successor, Westrom announced her withdrawal from the 2022 election on February 10, 2022. She planned to serve the rest of her term through the end of the year. Chad Aull won his primary election in a "landslide", and being unopposed in the general, was elected to Westrom's seat.
