= John Tilley (Kentucky politician) =

American politician

Secretary of the Kentucky Justice and Public Safety Cabinet
- In office December 10, 2015 – December 10, 2019
- Governor: Matt Bevin
- Preceded by: J. Michael Brown
- Succeeded by: Mary C. Noble

Member of the Kentucky House of Representatives from the 8th district
- In office January 1, 2007 – December 21, 2015
- Preceded by: James R. Carr
- Succeeded by: Jeffery R. Taylor

Personal details
- Born: December 25, 1968 (age 57) Hopkinsville, Kentucky
- Party: Democratic
- Education: UK College of Communications; Salmon P. Chase College of Law

John Charles Tilley is an American politician and attorney. He is a former member of the Kentucky House of Representatives and served as the Secretary of the Kentucky Justice and Public Safety Cabinet.

Tilley is a former chair of the National Association of State Legislature's Criminal Law and Justice Committee. He has worked both nationally and internationally in the areas of criminal justice reform, drug policy, and juvenile justice. Previously, Tilley served on various boards and committees, including the Council of State Governments (CSG) Leadership Council and the CSG Justice Center's Executive Committee until his term was up in 2019.

== Early life ==
Tilley is from Hopkinsville, Kentucky. He graduated from Christian County High School. He then went to the University of Kentucky and graduated from the College of Communications with a degree in journalism in 1991. He interned at WKYT-TV and worked for them as a general assignment reporter. and then earned his Juris Doctor from Salmon P. Chase College of Law at Northern Kentucky University.

== Political career ==
Tilley challenged James R. Carr, the incumbent Republican Representative for Kentucky's 8th State House district, in the 2006 elections. Carr had been elected as a Democrat in 2004, but switched to the Republican Party in 2005. Tilley defeated Carr in the election.

During his time in the House, Tilley served as the chairman of the Judiciary Committee from 2009 to 2015. During his tenure, he sponsored legislation to strengthen public safety, while controlling corrections costs and increasing drug treatment. He also sponsored or championed sweeping legislation on opioids and pill mills, dating violence, stalking and sexual assault, synthetic drugs, juvenile justice and internet crimes against children. He was interested in running for Attorney General of Kentucky in the 2015 election, but declined to run.

In December 2015, Governor Matt Bevin appointed Tilley to the position of Secretary of the Kentucky Justice and Public Safety Cabinet. In his capacity as secretary, he oversaw more than 7,000 employees and five major departments, including Corrections, Criminal Justice Training, Public Advocacy, Juvenile Justice, and the Kentucky State Police. The office also oversaw the State Medical Examiner and the Office of Drug Control Policy. He has led an overhaul of the Department of Juvenile Justice to modernize policy, lower costs, and achieve better outcomes for both children and public safety. He also spearheaded a redesign of the Department of Corrections Reentry Division to focus resources on training inmates and connecting them with sustainable employment, housing and transportation. In addition, Tilley headed up the 23-member Criminal Justice Policy Assessment Council, a bipartisan panel focused on lowering recidivism and building a fairer system of justice. The council's work led to successful reforms that reduced barriers to reentry and boosted job training for inmates.

== Arrest ==
In August 2022, Tilley was charged with first-degree rape in connection to an alleged incident that occurred earlier that year. He was acquitted of rape on July 23, 2024.
