= Ed Whitfield =

American politician (born 1943)

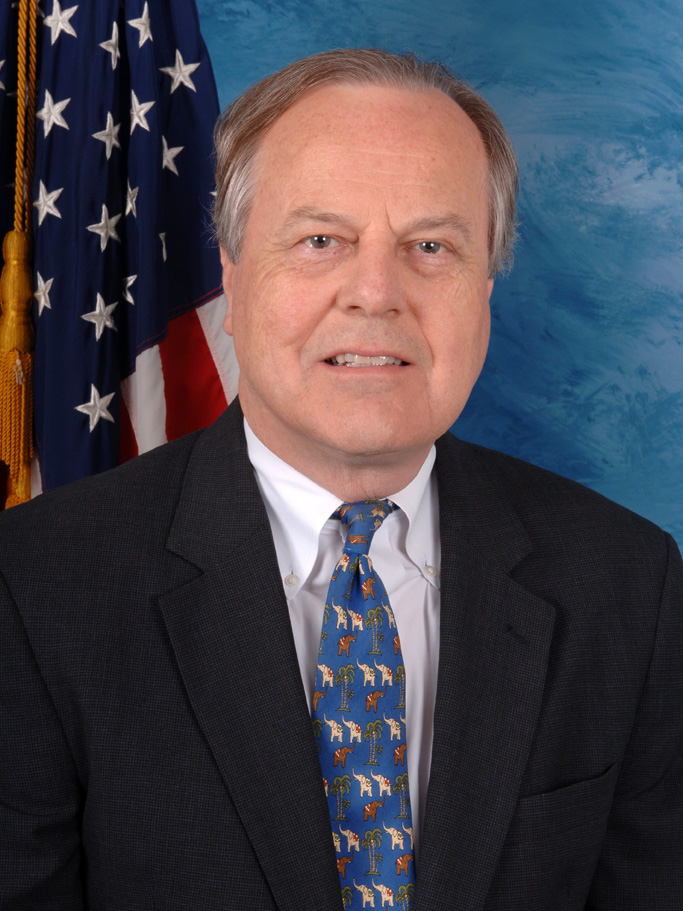

Member of the U.S. House of Representatives from Kentucky's 1st district
- In office January 3, 1995 – September 6, 2016
- Preceded by: Tom Barlow
- Succeeded by: James Comer

Member of the Kentucky House of Representatives from the 8th district
- In office January 1, 1974 – January 1, 1976
- Preceded by: John Hardin
- Succeeded by: Ramsey Morris

Personal details
- Born: Wayne Edward Whitfield; May 25, 1943 (age 83) Hopkinsville, Kentucky, U.S.
- Party: Democratic (before 1994); Republican (1994–present)
- Spouse: Constance Whitfield (m. 1990)
- Children: 1
- Education: University of Kentucky (BS, JD); Wesley Theological Seminary

Military service
- Allegiance: United States
- Branch/service: United States Army Reserve
- Years of service: 1967–1973
- Rank: First Lieutenant
- Unit: 100th Infantry Division

Wayne Edward Whitfield (born May 25, 1943) is an American politician and attorney who served as the U.S. representative of Kentucky's 1st congressional district from January 1995, until his resignation in September 2016. He is a member of the Republican Party, and the first to represent the district. His district covered much of the western part of the state, including Hopkinsville, Paducah, Henderson and Kentucky's share of Fort Campbell.

== Early life, education and career ==
Whitfield was born in Hopkinsville, Kentucky; his family later moved to Madisonville, Kentucky, where he graduated from Madisonville High School. He attended the University of Kentucky for both undergraduate and law school, where he was a member of Delta Tau Delta fraternity. He also attended the Wesley Theological Seminary. He served in the United States Army Reserve and reached the rank of First Lieutenant. He served as legal counsel to executives at Seaboard System Railroad of Washington. He served as a Vice President for the later CSX Corporation in two different capacities and was the Legal Counsel to the Chairman of the Interstate Commerce Commission from 1991 to 1993. this was a time when the Commission was deregulating the railroad and trucking industries. He was elected to the United States Congress in November 1994 and began his term in January, 1995, as a member of the 104th Congress. During his 21 plus years in the congress, Whitfield served on the Energy and Commerce Committee and served as Chairman of the Oversight and Investigation, Energy and Power Subcommittees.

== Kentucky House of Representatives ==
Whitfield first became interested in politics as a high school student and attended his first political event at a rally for former United States Senator Dee Huddleston. At the time, like Huddleston, Whitfield was a Democrat. As a student at the University of Kentucky, Whitfield was elected President of the University Young Democrats and in 1962 became involved in Edward T. Breathitt's successful campaign for Governor of Kentucky. As a student, Whitfield worked in the State Treasurer's office and after graduating from U.K. Law School he was elected to the Kentucky House of Representatives in 1973 as a Democrat. He represented Hopkinsville and parts of Trigg County. After serving one term he decided not to seek re-election in 1975 or challenge freshman U.S. representative Carroll Hubbard in the 1976 primary. He focused on his family's oil distributorship until he went to work with Seaboard System Railroad as legal counsel in 1979.

== U.S. Representative ==
=== Committee assignments ===
- Committee on Energy and Commerce
  - Subcommittee on Energy and Power (Chair)
  - Subcommittee on Environment and Economy
  - Subcommittee on Health

Whitfield was a member of the moderate Republican Main Street Partnership. On his official website, he represented himself as a conservative who has consistently voted anti-abortion and "supports allowing students to engage in voluntary school prayer." He also lists military issues and encouraging the continued use of coal and nuclear as an anchor for baseload power to insure the use of an abundant, affordable and reliable source of electricity in the United States. The Sunlight Foundation reported in 2008 that among the 435 members of the U.S. House of Representatives, Whitfield had the seventh-highest amount of investment in oil stocks. Whitfield was co-founder of the United States Turkish Caucus in the United States Congress. Recognizing the important role Turkey plays as the only Muslim Nation in NATO and having had many conversations with commanding generals of the 101st Airborne Division at Fort Campbell, Kentucky, Whitfield thought it was important to form a Congressional entity to provide support for Turkey in its role as a NATO Member.

He was one of three Republicans who voted for the Lilly Ledbetter Fair Pay Act in 2009.

When chairman of the Subcommittee on Oversight and Investigations within the Committee on Energy and Commerce, Whitfield held hearings on child pornography and during his tenure as Chairman of Energy and Power has chaired over 40 hearings on energy issues. He has focused significant time and resources to inform the American people about President Obama's Clean Power Plan which was initiated by regulation through the EPA. President Obama and EPA did not consult or make any effort to work with Congress before issuing the Clean Power Plan to dictate the way electricity would be generated in the future. Chairman Whitfield referred to the Clean Power Plan as "extreme" and an "unprecedented power grab". At one of his hearings, Professor Lawrence Tribe, who teaches constitutional law at Harvard University, said the Clean Power Plan if implemented would be like tearing up the Constitution of the United States. The Supreme Court, in considering a petition filed by 27 states opposed to the Clean Power Plan, issued an injunction to stop implementation of the plan. The DC Circuit Court of Appeals is currently preparing to hear oral arguments on the Clean Power Plan.

=== Legislation sponsored ===
Whitfield introduced the Electricity Security and Affordability Act (H.R. 3826; 113th Congress) into the House on January 9, 2014. The bill would repeal a pending rule published by the Environmental Protection Agency (EPA) on January 8, 2014. The proposed rule would establish uniform national limits on greenhouse gas (GHG) emissions from new electricity-generating facilities that use coal or natural gas. The rule also sets new standards of performance for those power plants, including the requirement to install carbon capture and sequestration technology. Whitfield said that, if finalized, the EPA's rule would "make it impossible to build a new coal-powered plant in American... That is hard to believe that that will can be the situation in our great country, particularly since 40 percent of our electricity comes from coal." Whitfield argued that the legislation was needed because the EPA refused to respond to criticism or complaints about their proposed rule. He also introduced and managed the floor debate on two Congressional Review Acts that had passed the United States Senate to stop the Clean Energy Plan Regulations adopted by EPA. He was successful in passing both measures on the House floor.

Whitfield's major legislative accomplishments are creating the 170,000 acre of National Recreation Area at the Land between the Lakes. He also introduced and helped pass a health compensation program at the Paducah Gaseous Diffusion Plant, which paid over $315,000,000 to the 3,139 employees and victims of toxic contamination. He also helped create the first Medicare Prescription Drug benefit plan for seniors.

Whitfield has introduced, sponsored and helped pass several bills to strengthen and insure the humane treatment of animals in the United States. He is a recognized leader regarding the humane treatment of animals. His major national accomplishment may have been the banning of U.S. horse slaughter for human consumption, with an amendment that barred the U.S. Department of Agriculture from spending money on inspections of horse slaughterhouses, which fed demand for horsemeat in some European and Asian countries. The ban is no longer in place, but it had the effect of killing the horse-slaughter industry in the U.S.

Whitfield's legislation to prohibit the soring of Tennessee Walking Horses garnered the support of 311 House members and 57 Members of the United States Senate but was not brought to the floor of the House of Representatives because of an ethics complaint filed by individuals who sored horses . The individuals who filed the complaint had a total of 52 violations of the 1970 Horse Protection Act. In July 2016, the House Ethics Committee reproved him for failing to prohibit lobbying contacts between his staff and Connie Harriman Whitfield, a lobbyist for the Humane Society of the United States. The bill was introduced by Congressman Whitfield and had been a concern of his for many years; the Humane Society of the United States supported the legislation and was a part of a coalition of over 75 entities working to adopt it. The Ethics Committee issued a report stating that Whitfield's breach was unintentional. Whitfield said the individuals who filed the complaint had accomplished their goal of stopping his legislation.

Whitfield was ranked as the 43rd most bipartisan member of the U.S. House of Representatives during the 114th United States Congress (and the most bipartisan member of the U.S. House of Representatives from Kentucky) in the Bipartisan Index created by The Lugar Center and the McCourt School of Public Policy that ranks members of the United States Congress by their degree of bipartisanship (by measuring the frequency each member's bills attract co-sponsors from the opposite party and each member's co-sponsorship of bills by members of the opposite party).

== Political campaigns ==
Whitfield had been a Democrat for most of his life, but in 1994 filed to run in the 1st District as a Republican. He defeated the 1992 Republican nominee, Steve Hamrick, in the primary, and then defeated freshman Democratic Congressman Tom Barlow by 2,500 votes. He defeated Dennis Null in 1996 even as Bill Clinton carried the district, and never faced a close race afterwards. On September 29, 2015, Whitfield announced that he would not seek re-election in 2016. Critics said he did not seek re-election because of an ethics complaint filed against him by a group opposed to his legislation to stop the soring of Tennessee walking horses. That complaint was filed in 2013, and despite publicity throughout his district, Whitfield was re-elected overwhelmingly. He won every county in his district with the exception of Marion. On August 31, 2016, Whitfield announced that he would resign, effective September 6, prompting a special election that would allow his successor to serve in the lame duck session of Congress after the Nov. 8 election.

== Personal life ==
Connie Whitfield is the Congressman's second wife. She was a former Justice Department attorney as well as Assistant Secretary of Interior for Fish, Wildlife and National Parks in the George H.W. Bush Presidency. She was also a Director of the Export-Import Bank of the United States and was appointed Vice Chair of the Kentucky Horse Racing Commission by Kentucky Governor Ernie Fletcher. On November 14, 2016, Whitfield was presented the Distinguished Rural Kentuckian Award by the Kentucky Association of Electric Cooperatives at a ceremony in Louisville, Kentucky.

U.S. House of Representatives
Preceded by Thomas Barlow	Member of the U.S. House of Representatives from Kentucky's 1st congressional district 1995–2016	Succeeded by James Comer
U.S. order of precedence (ceremonial)
Preceded by Patrick McHenry as Former U.S. Representative	Order of precedence of the United States as Former U.S. Representative	Succeeded by Tim Ryan as Former U.S. Representative
