= John C. Roach =

American judge

Justice of the Kentucky Supreme Court
- In office June 10, 2005 – December 31, 2006
- Nominated by: Ernie Fletcher
- Preceded by: James E. Keller
- Succeeded by: Mary C. Noble

Personal details
- Born: Frankfort, Kentucky
- Spouse: Maria Roach
- Education: University of Kentucky College of Law

John C. Roach is a former Justice of the Kentucky Supreme Court. He was appointed by Governor Ernie Fletcher on June 10, 2005. His term ended on December 31, 2006. He lost an election to a new eight-year term in the November 2006 election to Judge Mary C. Noble.

== Biography ==
Roach was born and raised in Frankfort, Kentucky. He and his wife Maria have two children named Catherine and Bennett.

Roach attended Washington and Lee University for his undergraduate studies. He then went on to the University of Kentucky College of Law, where he graduated in the top five of his law school class, served as Articles Editor of the Kentucky Law Journal, and was a member of the Order of the Coif. After law school he clerked for Judge Pierce Lively on the United States Court of Appeals for the Sixth Circuit. Thereafter, Roach was an attorney with Akin, Gump, Strauss, Hauer & Feld in Washington, D.C. In 1995, he joined the law firm of Ransdell, Roach & Wier, PLLC in Lexington, Kentucky and was a partner there from 1996 until 2001.

Roach was General Counsel to Governor Fletcher before his appointment to the bench at the age of 38. He was Justice for the Fifth Judicial District.

Roach is currently a partner at Ransdell, Roach & Royce, a Lexington, Kentucky law firm.

Preceded by Denis Fleming	General Counsel to the Governor of Kentucky; 2003–2005	Succeeded by James Deckard
Preceded by James E. Keller	Justice of the Supreme Court of Kentucky, 5th District; 2005–2007	Succeeded by Mary C. Noble
