= C. Wesley Morgan =

American politician (born 1950)

Wesley Morgan

Member of the Kentucky House of Representatives from the 81st district
- In office January 1, 2017 – January 1, 2019
- Preceded by: Rita Smart
- Succeeded by: Deanna Frazier

Personal details
- Born: Clinton Wesley Morgan; July 23, 1950 (age 76) Hyden, Kentucky, U.S.
- Party: Republican
- Spouse: Lindsey
- Children: 2
- Education: University of the Cumberlands (BS); Eastern Kentucky University (BBA)

Clinton Wesley Morgan (born July 23, 1950) is an American businessman and politician from the state of Kentucky. A member of the Republican Party, Morgan is a former member of the Kentucky House of Representatives for the 81st district.

== Early life and career ==
Morgan grew up in Leslie County, Kentucky. He graduated from Leslie County High School, Cumberland College, and Eastern Kentucky University.

After working as a criminal investigator for the Bureau of Alcohol, Tobacco & Firearms as a young man, Morgan returned to Richmond, Kentucky, and opened a liquor store in 1982. Eventually, he opened a large business called Liquor World and became wealthy. He expanded Liquor World into a chain of four stores.

== Political career ==
Morgan ran for the Kentucky House of Representatives in the 81st district in the 2014 elections. He lost to Democrat Rita Smart, the incumbent. In November 2016, buoyed by strong local support for Donald Trump, Morgan defeated Smart, receiving 9,056 votes to 8,980 for Smart, a margin of just 76 votes.

Early in his single term, Morgan was criticized for introducing legislation that would have benefitted the liquor industry. Democratic legislators criticized Morgan for introducing bills that would have immunized drivers who hit protesters in roads and would have allowed teachers to carry guns at school.

Morgan clashed with Republican leaders as well. In November 2017, he called for the resignation of Republican Jeff Hoover, Speaker of the Kentucky House of Representatives, after the news emerged that Hoover had secretly settled a sexual harassment case brought by a female staffer. Hoover resigned as speaker, but kept his house seat.

Morgan lost renomination to the Kentucky House to Deanna Frazier in the 2018 elections. Morgan endorsed the Democratic nominee in the race. Morgan unsuccessfully ran for the Republican nomination in the 2020 U.S. Senate election in Kentucky against Mitch McConnell, placing second with 6.2% of the vote. During the campaign, he denounced McConnell as a "deep-state traitor" and praised what he called the "patriots" of QAnon.

== Personal life ==
Morgan and his first wife had a daughter, Jordan. He and his second wife, Lindsey, have a daughter named Sydney.

=== Mansion ===
In 2009, convinced that the presidency of Barack Obama would lead the country to social breakdown, civil war, and "roving bands of gangs", Morgan purchased 200 acres (81 ha) of land near Richmond and built a 14,300-square-foot (1,330 m^{2}) house with nine bedrooms and three kitchens. He built a 2,000-square-foot (190 m^{2}) survival bunker 26 feet (7.9 m) below ground level, with a 39-inch (990 mm) thick ceiling and two tunnels. After his defeat in the 2020 U.S. Senate primary, Morgan decided to sell his house and leave Kentucky. He listed his house for $6.5 million on Zillow. The listing went viral and attracted unwanted attention and criticism because of the underground survival bunker.

=== 2022 home invasion ===
On the night of February 22, 2022, an intruder climbed to a second-floor balcony, broke into the house, and killed Morgan's 32-year-old daughter Jordan in her bed. The man then shot Morgan in the arm; Morgan returned fire with a pistol, but the intruder escaped. He was arrested several days later and charged with murder and attempted murder. The suspect was identified as Shannon Gilday, a former soldier and self proclaimed Marxist with psychiatric problems who had intended to take control of the underground bunker. The listing for the home and bunker was removed from the market in August 2023. In March 2026, Gilday was found guilty but mentally ill on all charges, and received a life sentence, with parole eligibility in 25 years.
