= Kentucky Department of Juvenile Justice =

State agency of Kentucky

The Kentucky Department of Juvenile Justice (KYDJJ) is a state agency of Kentucky headquartered in unincorporated Franklin County, near Frankfort. The agency operates juvenile correctional facilities.

It was established after a 1996 act of the Kentucky General Assembly.

== Facilities ==
=== Regional Juvenile Detention Centers ===
- Adair Regional Juvenile Detention Center (ARJDC), Columbia
- Boyd Regional Juvenile Detention Center, (BRJDC), Ashland
- Breathitt Regional Youth Detention Center (BRYDC), Jackson
- Campbell Regional Juvenile Detention Center (CRJDC), Newport
- Fayette Regional Juvenile Detention Center (FRJDC), Lexington
- Jefferson Regional Juvenile Detention Center (JRJDC), Lyndon
- McCracken Regional Juvenile Detention Center (MRJDC), Paducah
- Warren Regional Juvenile Detention Center (WRJDC), Bowling Green

=== Youth Development Centers ===
These are places for adjudicated (convicted of juvenile crimes) youth who are to be treated.

- Adair Youth Development Center, Columbia
  - Houses up to 80 boys and girls
- Lake Cumberland Youth Development Center, Monticello
- Mayfield Youth Development Center, Mayfield
- Morehead Youth Development Center, Morehead
  - Houses only girls: they are incarcerated for more minor crimes, such as truancy, and more serious ones, such as murder.
- Northern Kentucky Youth Development Center, Crittenden
- Woodsbend Youth Development Center, West Liberty

=== Group Homes ===
- Ashland Group Home, Ashland
- Burnside Group Home, Burnside
- Frankfort Group Home, Frankfort
- Frenchburg Group Home, Denniston
- Hopkinsville Group Home, Hopkinsville
- Jackson Group Home, Jackson
- London Group Home, London
- Middlesboro Group Home, Middlesboro
- Westport Group Home, Louisville

=== Day Treatment Centers ===
- Ashland Day Treatment Center, Boyd County, Ashland
- Breathitt Day Treatment Center, Breathitt County, Breathitt
- Christian County Day Treatment Center, Christian County, Hopkinsville
- Hardin County Day Treatment Center, Hardin County, Elizabethtown
- Louisville Day Treatment Center, Jefferson County, Louisville
- Owensboro Day Treatment Center, Daviess County, Owensboro
