= Kentucky Justice and Public Safety Cabinet =

- Seal of the State of Kentucky

Agency overview
- Headquarters: 125 Holmes Street; Frankfort, Kentucky
- Employees: about 8,000
- Agency executive: Keith Jackson, Cabinet Secretary
- Website: Kentucky Justice and Public Safety Cabinet

The Kentucky Justice and Public Safety Cabinet (JPSC) is an agency of the U.S. Commonwealth of Kentucky that is responsible for providing law enforcement, criminal justice and correctional services to the citizens of Kentucky. The Cabinet is headed by a Cabinet Secretary appointed by the Governor of Kentucky, with the consent of the Kentucky State Senate. The Cabinet Secretary is a key member of the Governor's senior policy staff.

The current Secretary of the Justice and Public Safety Cabinet is Keith Jackson, who succeeded Kerry B. Harvey and Mary C. Noble as governor Andy Beshear's third secretary of the cabinet.

== Organization ==
The Justice and Public Safety Cabinet is headed by a Secretary, who is appointed by the Governor. The Secretary is assisted in managing the Cabinet by a Deputy Secretary, who oversees the activities of the Cabinet in the absence of the Secretary. The Cabinet is composed of several agencies and organizational units. The staff of the Cabinet is divided between the Executive Staff, which provides management and administrative services to the entire Cabinet, and the Departmental Staff, which perform the work of the Cabinet.

- Cabinet Secretary
  - Deputy Secretary
    - Office of the Secretary
    - Kentucky State Police
    - Kentucky Department of Criminal Justice Training
      - Law Enforcement Council
    - Kentucky Department of Corrections
      - State Corrections Commission
    - Kentucky Department of Juvenile Justice
    - Kentucky Department of Public Advocacy
    - Office of Drug Control Policy
    - Office of Legal Services
    - Office of Legislative and Intergovernmental Services
      - Criminal Justice Council
    - Office of Management and Administrative Services
    - Office of the State Medical Examiner
    - Office of Investigations
    - Kentucky Parole Board
