= List of special elections to the Kentucky House of Representatives =

Special elections to the Kentucky House of Representatives are held when a vacancy occurs in the Kentucky House of Representatives. Elections are called by the governor of Kentucky when the General Assembly is not in session, and by the speaker of the House when it is in session.

== List of special elections ==
District	Date	Predecessor	Winner
82	January 15, 1971	Archie Brown (R)	Randolph Smith (R)
42	February 18, 1971	Hughes McGill (D)	Charlotte McGill (D)
31	February 26, 1971	Leo Bleemel (D)	Virginia Bleemel (D)
57	December 28, 1971	None (Note: The special election was held before the term began. The winner of the regular November election, William P. Curlin Jr., declined his seat after winning a special election to Kentucky's 6th congressional district.)	Kenneth C. Wood (D)
44	May 23, 1972	James Yocom (D)	Jim Yates (D)
50	May 23, 1972	Bernard Keene (D)	John Hurst (D) (Note: Hurst, a registered Democrat, was first elected as an independent "Freedom Party" candidate.)
67	May 23, 1972	James E. Murphy (D)	Terry L. Mann (D)
10	November 5, 1974	W. Michael Troop (D)	William T. Brinkley (D)
15	November 5, 1974	Bill Paxton (D)	Phillip Stone (D)
40	November 5, 1974	George Siemens Sr. (D)	George Siemens Jr. (D)
59	November 5, 1974	W. J. Louden (D)	Stanley Billingsley (D)
72	November 5, 1974	Brooks Hinkle (D)	Ted Kuster (R)
3	November 2, 1976	Fred Morgan (D)	Alice H. McNutt (D)
4	November 7, 1978	J. W. Boatwright Jr. (D)	Linda Boatwright (D)
78	January 27, 1979	Jack Trevey (R)	Pat Freibert (R)
89	March 8, 1980	Russell Reynolds (D)	Porter Reynolds (D)
75	January 25, 1982	William G. Kenton (D)	Carolyn Kenton (D)
86	November 8, 1983	Jimmy White (D)	Caroline White (D)
7	January 17, 1984	David Boswell (D)	Sam McElroy (D) (Note: McElroy, a registered Democrat, was first elected as an independent candidate.)
18	January 24, 1984	Mary Ann Tobin (D)	Donnie Gedling (D)
46	January 24, 1984	Harold Haering (R)	Larry Clark (D)
69	January 24, 1984	Art Schmidt (R)	Jon Reinhardt (R)
99	January 22, 1986	Ray O. Brown (D)	Frances Brown (D)
53	January 27, 1987	Vacant (Note: The winner of the 1986 election, Welby Hoover, died before the term began.)	Mae Hoover (R)
34	August 4, 1987	Gerta Bendl (D)	Jack Will (R)
32	November 3, 1987	Fred Cowan (D)	Anne Northup (R)
1	December 15, 1987	Ward Burnette (D)	Charles Geveden (D)
76	December 29, 1989	Jerry Lundergan (D)	Tony Curtsinger (R)
2	August 27, 1991	Dick Castleman (D)	Robbie Castleman (D)
71	February 15, 1992	Walter Blevins (D)	Jerry Ravenscraft (D)
40	September 15, 1992	Jerry Bronger (D)	Donna Shacklette (D)
61	September 15, 1992	Clay Crupper (D)	Royce Adams (D)
14	June 15, 1993	Don Blandford (D)	Mark Treesh (R)
86	June 15, 1993	Tom Smith (R)	Elbert Hampton (R)
26	November 2, 1993	Virgil Pearman (D)	Kaye Bondurant (D)
24	January 11, 1994	David Hourigan (D)	William Scott (D)
34	January 11, 1994	Mike Ward (D)	Mary Lou Marzian (D)
49	January 11, 1994	John Harper (R)	Allen Maricle (R)
65	January 11, 1994	Martin Sheehan (D)	Arnold Simpson (D)
21	February 20, 1996	Billy Ray Smith (D)	Roger Thomas (D)
40	February 20, 1996	Donna Shacklette (D)	Dennis Horlander (D)
42	February 20, 1996	Leonard Gray (D)	Eleanor Jordan (D)
62	June 25, 1996	Mark Farrow (D)	Dean House (D)
100	June 25, 1996	Donald B. Farley (R)	John Vincent (R)
19	November 5, 1996	Richie Sanders (R)	Anthony Mello (R)
28	January 20, 1998	Bill Lile (R)	Charles Miller (D)
91	March 16, 1999	Vacant (Note: The winner of the 1998 election, Paul Mason, died before the term began.)	Howard Cornett (R)
43	January 18, 2000	E. Porter Hatcher Jr. (D)	Paul Bather (D)
73	November 6, 2001	R. J. Palmer (D)	Don Pasley (D)
95	February 17, 2004	Greg Stumbo (D)	Chuck Meade (D)
59	May 24, 2005	Tim Feeley (R)	David W. Osborne (R)
37	February 14, 2006	Perry B. Clark (D)	Ron Weston (D)
63	January 8, 2008	Jon Draud (R)	Alecia Webb-Edgington (R)
72	January 8, 2008	Carolyn Belcher (D)	Sannie Overly (D)
6	February 5, 2008	J. R. Gray (D)	Will Coursey (D)
95	February 5, 2008	Brandon Spencer (D)	Greg Stumbo (D)
84	March 18, 2008	Brandon Smith (R)	Scott Alexander (D)
96	December 8, 2009	Robin L. Webb (D)	Jill York (R)
24	February 2, 2010	Jimmy Higdon (R)	Terry Mills (D)
82	December 20, 2011	Dewayne Bunch (R)	Regina Bunch (R)
53	February 7, 2012	James Comer (R)	Bart Rowland (R)
2	November 6, 2012	Fred Nesler (D)	Richard Heath (R)
52	February 12, 2013	Vacant (Note: The winner of the 2012 election, Sara Beth Gregory, declined her seat after winning a special election to the 16th Senate district.)	Ken Upchurch (R)
56	June 25, 2013	Carl Rollins (D)	James Kay (D)
7	December 10, 2013	John Arnold (D)	Suzanne Miles (R)
8	March 8, 2016	John Tilley (D)	Jeffery R. Taylor (D)
54	March 8, 2016	Mike Harmon (R)	Daniel Elliott (R)
62	March 8, 2016	Ryan Quarles (R)	Chuck Tackett (D)
98	March 8, 2016	Tanya Pullin (D)	Lew Nicholls (D)
49	February 20, 2018	Dan Johnson (R)	Linda H. Belcher (D)
89	February 27, 2018	Marie Rader (R)	Robert Goforth (R)
18	November 5, 2019	Tim Moore (R)	Samara Heavrin (R)
63	November 5, 2019	Diane St. Onge (R)	Kim Banta (R)
67	February 25, 2020	Dennis Keene (D)	Rachel Roberts (D)
99	February 25, 2020	Rocky Adkins (D)	Richard White (R)
51	November 2, 2021	John Carney (R)	Michael Pollock (R)
89	November 2, 2021	Robert Goforth (R)	Timmy Truett (R)
42	February 22, 2022	Reginald Meeks (D)	Keturah Herron (D)
93	November 7, 2023	Lamin Swann (D)	Adrielle Camuel (D)
24	March 19, 2024	Brandon Reed (R)	Courtney Gilbert (R)
26	March 19, 2024	Russell Webber (R)	Peyton Griffee (R)
