= 2014 Kentucky House of Representatives election =

- November 4, 2014

All 100 seats in the Kentucky House of Representatives 51 seats needed for a majority
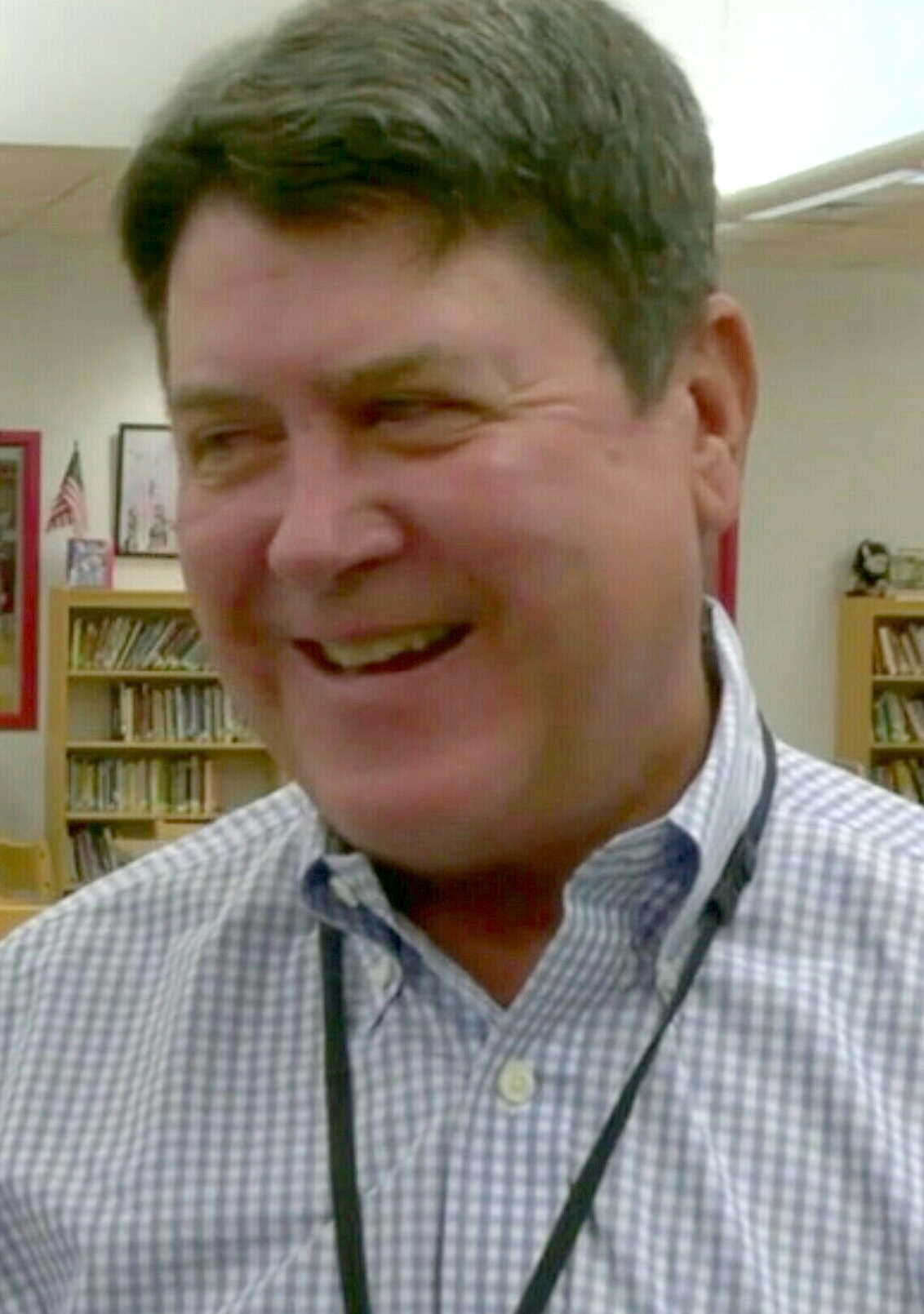

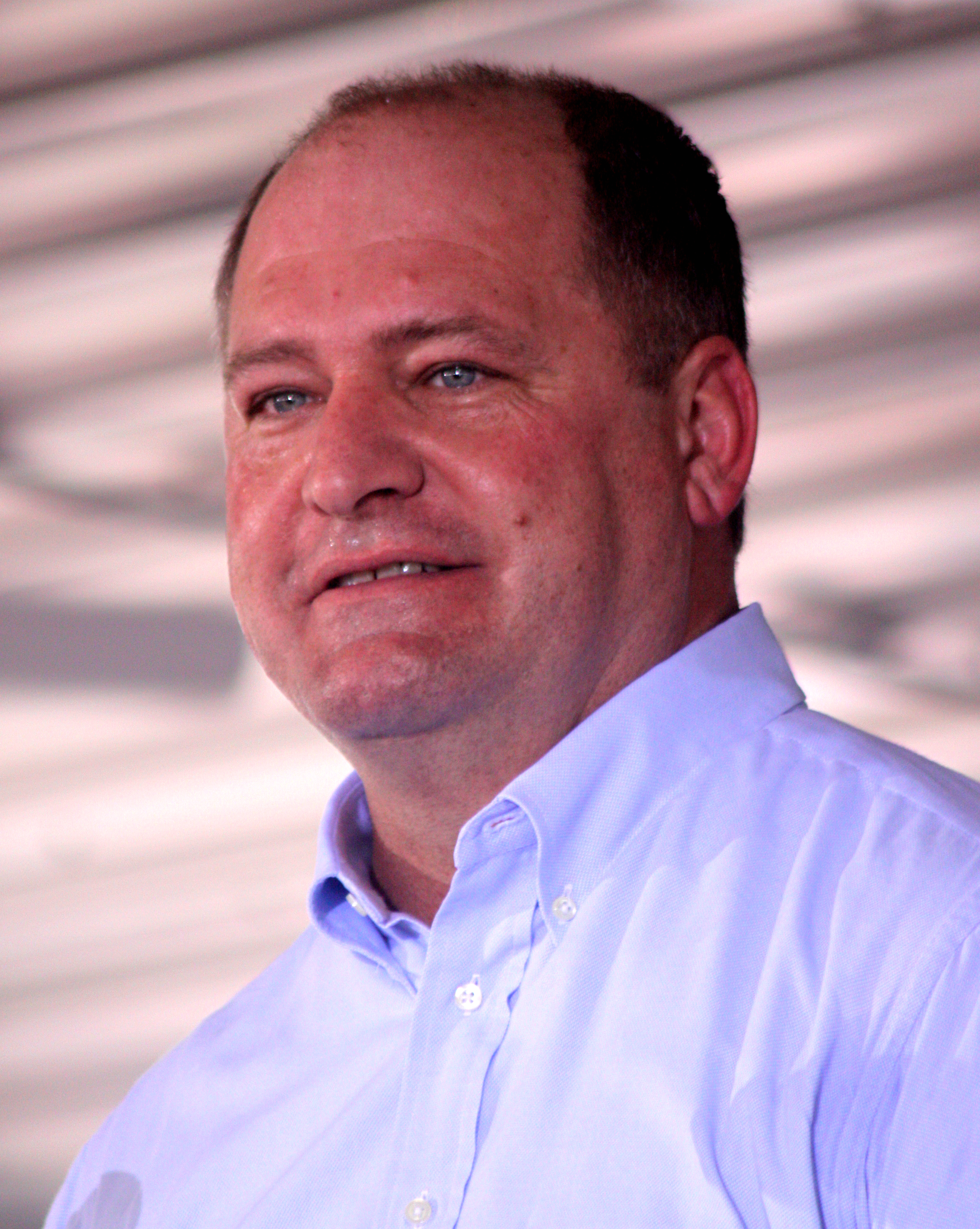
| | Majority party | Minority party |
|---|---|---|
| Leader | Greg Stumbo | Jeff Hoover |
| Party | Democratic | Republican |
| Leader since | January 6, 2009 | January 2, 2001 |
| Leader's seat | 95th – Prestonsburg | 83rd – Jamestown |
| Last election | 55 | 45 |
| Seats before | 54 | 46 (Note: Republicans flipped a seat in a December 2013 special election following the resignation of John Arnold.) |
| Seats won | 54 | 46 |
| Seat change | Steady | Steady |
- Democratic hold Democratic gain Republican hold Republican gain 50–60% 60–70% 70–80% 80–90% >90% 50–60% 60–70% 70–80% 80–90% >90%
Speaker before election
Greg Stumbo
Democratic
Elected Speaker
Greg Stumbo
Democratic

The 2014 Kentucky House of Representatives election was held on November 4, 2014. The Democratic and Republican primary elections were held on May 20. Democrats maintained their majority in the chamber without gaining or losing any seats. This is the most recent election where Democrats won a majority in the chamber, following their loss in the 2016 election.

== Overview ==
| Party | Candidates | | Votes | % | Seats | | |
| Party | Opposed | Unopposed | Votes | % | Before | Won | +/− |
|---|---|---|---|---|---|---|---|
| Democratic | 51 | 25 | 615,266 | 48.94 | 54 | 54 | - |
| Republican | 51 | 23 | 635,192 | 50.53 | 46 | 46 | - |
| Independent | 2 | 0 | 6,656 | 0.53 | 0 | 0 | - |
| Total | 104 | 48 | 1,257,114 | 100.00 | 100 | 100 | ±0 |
Source: Kentucky Secretary of State

== Retirements ==
A total of seven representatives (three Democrats and four Republicans) retired, four of whom (one Democrat and three Republicans) retired to run for other offices.

=== Democratic ===
1. 39th: Robert Damron (Nicholasville): Retired to run for Judge/Executive of Jessamine County.
2. 71st: John Stacy (West Liberty): Retired.
3. 77th: Jesse Crenshaw (Lexington): Retired.

=== Republican ===
1. 10th: Ben Waide (Madisonville): Retired to run for Judge/Executive of Hopkins County.
2. 17th: C. B. Embry (Morgantown): Retired to run for the Kentucky Senate.
3. 18th: Dwight Butler (Harned): Retired.
4. 32nd: Julie Raque Adams (Louisville): Retired to run for the Kentucky Senate.

== Incumbents defeated ==
One incumbent lost renomination in the primary election and three incumbents lost reelection in the general election.

=== In the primary election ===
==== Democrats ====
One Democrat lost renomination.

1. 93rd: Keith Hall (first elected in 2000) lost renomination to Chris Harris, who won the general election.

==== Republicans ====
No Republicans lost renomination.

=== In the general election ===
==== Democrats ====
Two Democrats lost reelection to Republicans.

1. 25th: Jimmie Lee (first elected in 1992) lost to Jim DuPlessis.
2. 74th: Richard Henderson (first elected in 2006) lost to David Hale.

==== Republicans ====
One Republican lost reelection to a Democrat.

1. 91st: Toby Herald (first elected in 2012) lost to Cluster Howard.

== Redistricting ==
2014 was the first election following the redistricting of the house in 2013, which moved eight incumbents into different districts. Three districts had two incumbents grouped together, while three districts had no incumbent.

| District | Incumbent before redistricting | Incumbent(s) after redistricting |
|---|---|---|
| 9th | Myron Dossett | Myron Dossett; Ben Waide |
| 10th | Ben Waide | Dwight Butler |
| 17th | C. B. Embry | Jim DeCesare; C. B. Embry |
| 18th | Dwight Butler | Tim Moore |
| 21st | Jim DeCesare | Bart Rowland |
| 26th | Tim Moore | Russell Webber |
| 36th | Jonathan Shell | Open seat |
| 49th | Russell Webber | Open seat |
| 53rd | Bart Rowland | Open seat |
| 71st | John Stacy | Jonathan Shell |
| 97th | Hubert Collins | Hubert Collins; John Stacy |

== Summary by district ==
(*) – Incumbent redistricted to another district
† – Incumbent did not seek reelection

| District | Incumbent | Party | Elected | Party |
|---|---|---|---|---|
| 1 | Steven Rudy | Rep | Steven Rudy | Rep |
| 2 | Richard Heath | Rep | Richard Heath | Rep |
| 3 | Gerald Watkins | Dem | Gerald Watkins | Dem |
| 4 | Lynn Bechler | Rep | Lynn Bechler | Rep |
| 5 | Kenny Imes | Rep | Kenny Imes | Rep |
| 6 | Will Coursey | Dem | Will Coursey | Dem |
| 7 | Suzanne Miles | Rep | Suzanne Miles | Rep |
| 8 | John Tilley | Dem | John Tilley | Dem |
| 9 | Myron Dossett | Rep | Myron Dossett | Rep |
| 10 | Ben Waide*† | Rep | Dean Schamore | Dem |
| 11 | David Watkins | Dem | David Watkins | Dem |
| 12 | Jim Gooch Jr. | Dem | Jim Gooch Jr. | Dem |
| 13 | Jim Glenn | Dem | Jim Glenn | Dem |
| 14 | Tommy Thompson | Dem | Tommy Thompson | Dem |
| 15 | Brent Yonts | Dem | Brent Yonts | Dem |
| 16 | Martha Jane King | Dem | Martha Jane King | Dem |
| 17 | C. B. Embry† | Rep | Jim DeCesare | Rep |
| 18 | Dwight Butler*† | Rep | Tim Moore | Rep |
| 19 | Michael Meredith | Rep | Michael Meredith | Rep |
| 20 | Jody Richards | Dem | Jody Richards | Dem |
| 21 | Jim DeCesare* | Rep | Bart Rowland | Rep |
| 22 | Wilson Stone | Dem | Wilson Stone | Dem |
| 23 | Johnny Bell | Dem | Johnny Bell | Dem |
| 24 | Terry Mills | Dem | Terry Mills | Dem |
| 25 | Jimmie Lee | Dem | Jim DuPlessis | Rep |
| 26 | Tim Moore* | Rep | Russell Webber | Rep |
| 27 | Jeff Greer | Dem | Jeff Greer | Dem |
| 28 | Charles Miller | Dem | Charles Miller | Dem |
| 29 | Kevin Bratcher | Rep | Kevin Bratcher | Rep |
| 30 | Tom Burch | Dem | Tom Burch | Dem |
| 31 | Steve Riggs | Dem | Steve Riggs | Dem |
| 32 | Julie Raque Adams† | Rep | Phil Moffett | Rep |
| 33 | Ronald Crimm | Rep | Ronald Crimm | Rep |
| 34 | Mary Lou Marzian | Dem | Mary Lou Marzian | Dem |
| 35 | Jim Wayne | Dem | Jim Wayne | Dem |
| 36 | Jonathan Shell* | Rep | Jerry T. Miller | Rep |
| 37 | Jeffery Donohue | Dem | Jeffery Donohue | Dem |
| 38 | Denver Butler | Dem | Denver Butler | Dem |
| 39 | Robert Damron† | Dem | Russ Meyer | Dem |
| 40 | Dennis Horlander | Dem | Dennis Horlander | Dem |
| 41 | Tom Riner | Dem | Tom Riner | Dem |
| 42 | Reginald Meeks | Dem | Reginald Meeks | Dem |
| 43 | Darryl Owens | Dem | Darryl Owens | Dem |
| 44 | Joni Jenkins | Dem | Joni Jenkins | Dem |
| 45 | Stan Lee | Rep | Stan Lee | Rep |
| 46 | Larry Clark | Dem | Larry Clark | Dem |
| 47 | Rick Rand | Dem | Rick Rand | Dem |
| 48 | Bob DeWeese | Rep | Bob DeWeese | Rep |
| 49 | Russell Webber* | Rep | Linda H. Belcher | Dem |
| 50 | David Floyd | Rep | David Floyd | Rep |
| 51 | John Carney | Rep | John Carney | Rep |
| 52 | Ken Upchurch | Rep | Ken Upchurch | Rep |
| 53 | Bart Rowland* | Rep | James Tipton | Rep |
| 54 | Mike Harmon | Rep | Mike Harmon | Rep |
| 55 | Kim King | Rep | Kim King | Rep |
| 56 | James Kay | Dem | James Kay | Dem |
| 57 | Derrick Graham | Dem | Derrick Graham | Dem |
| 58 | Brad Montell | Rep | Brad Montell | Rep |
| 59 | David W. Osborne | Rep | David W. Osborne | Rep |
| 60 | Sal Santoro | Rep | Sal Santoro | Rep |
| 61 | Brian Linder | Rep | Brian Linder | Rep |
| 62 | Ryan Quarles | Rep | Ryan Quarles | Rep |
| 63 | Diane St. Onge | Rep | Diane St. Onge | Rep |
| 64 | Thomas Kerr | Rep | Thomas Kerr | Rep |
| 65 | Arnold Simpson | Dem | Arnold Simpson | Dem |
| 66 | Addia Wuchner | Rep | Addia Wuchner | Rep |
| 67 | Dennis Keene | Dem | Dennis Keene | Dem |
| 68 | Joseph Fischer | Rep | Joseph Fischer | Rep |
| 69 | Adam Koenig | Rep | Adam Koenig | Rep |
| 70 | Mike Denham | Dem | Mike Denham | Dem |
| 71 | John Stacy*† | Dem | Jonathan Shell | Rep |
| 72 | Sannie Overly | Dem | Sannie Overly | Dem |
| 73 | Donna Mayfield | Rep | Donna Mayfield | Rep |
| 74 | Richard Henderson | Dem | David Hale | Rep |
| 75 | Kelly Flood | Dem | Kelly Flood | Dem |
| 76 | Ruth Ann Palumbo | Dem | Ruth Ann Palumbo | Dem |
| 77 | Jesse Crenshaw† | Dem | George Brown Jr. | Dem |
| 78 | Tom McKee | Dem | Tom McKee | Dem |
| 79 | Susan Westrom | Dem | Susan Westrom | Dem |
| 80 | David Meade | Rep | David Meade | Rep |
| 81 | Rita Smart | Dem | Rita Smart | Dem |
| 82 | Regina Bunch | Rep | Regina Bunch | Rep |
| 83 | Jeff Hoover | Rep | Jeff Hoover | Rep |
| 84 | Fitz Steele | Dem | Fitz Steele | Dem |
| 85 | Tommy Turner | Rep | Tommy Turner | Rep |
| 86 | Jim Stewart | Rep | Jim Stewart | Rep |
| 87 | Rick Nelson | Dem | Rick Nelson | Dem |
| 88 | Robert Benvenuti | Rep | Robert Benvenuti | Rep |
| 89 | Marie Rader | Rep | Marie Rader | Rep |
| 90 | Tim Couch | Rep | Tim Couch | Rep |
| 91 | Toby Herald | Rep | Cluster Howard | Dem |
| 92 | John Short | Dem | John Short | Dem |
| 93 | Keith Hall | Dem | Chris Harris | Dem |
| 94 | Leslie A. Combs | Dem | Leslie A. Combs | Dem |
| 95 | Greg Stumbo | Dem | Greg Stumbo | Dem |
| 96 | Jill York | Rep | Jill York | Rep |
| 97 | Hubert Collins | Dem | Hubert Collins | Dem |
| 98 | Tanya Pullin | Dem | Tanya Pullin | Dem |
| 99 | Rocky Adkins | Dem | Rocky Adkins | Dem |
| 100 | Kevin Sinnette | Dem | Kevin Sinnette | Dem |

== Closest races ==
Fourteen races were decided by 10% or lower.

| District | Winner | Margin |
|---|---|---|
| 91st | Democratic (flip) | 0.10% |
| 25th | Republican (flip) | 1.79% |
| 13th | Democratic | 4.56% |
| 29th | Republican | 4.97% |
| 74th | Republican (flip) | 5.65% |
| 49th | Democratic (flip) | 5.84% |
| 50th | Republican | 6.63% |
| 32nd | Republican | 6.69% |
| 7th | Republican | 7.07% |
| 3rd | Democratic | 7.23% (Note: This seat was the tipping point seat for a Democratic majority.) |
| 10th | Democratic (flip) | 7.26% (Note: This seat was the tipping point seat for a Republican majority.) |
| 78th | Democratic | 8.03% |
| 23rd | Democratic | 8.64% |
| 24th | Democratic | 9.22% |

== Special elections ==
=== District 52 special ===
Ken Upchurch was elected in February 2013 after the winner of the 2012 election, Sara Beth Gregory, declined her seat in order to serve in the Kentucky Senate.

2013 Kentucky House of Representatives 52nd district special election
| Party | Candidate | Votes | % |
|---|---|---|---|
| Republican | Ken Upchurch | 1,666 | 59.1 |
| Democratic | Harvey Shearer | 1,153 | 40.9 |
| Total votes | | 2,819 | 100.0 |

=== District 56 special ===
James Kay was elected in June 2013 to fill the vacancy caused by the resignation of Carl Rollins in April 2013.

2013 Kentucky House of Representatives 56th district special election
| Party | Candidate | Votes | % |
|---|---|---|---|
| Democratic | James Kay | 3,925 | 44.0 |
| Republican | Lyen Crews | 3,065 | 34.4 |
| Independent | John-Mark B. Hack | 1,925 | 21.6 |
| Total votes | | 8,915 | 100.0 |
| Democratic hold | | | |

=== District 7 special ===
Suzanne Miles was elected in December 2013 to fill the vacancy caused by the resignation of John Arnold in September 2013.

2013 Kentucky House of Representatives 7th district special election
| Party | Candidate | Votes | % |
|---|---|---|---|
| Republican | Suzanne Miles | 3,548 | 50.8 |
| Democratic | Kim Humphrey | 3,436 | 49.2 |
| Total votes | | 6,984 | 100.0 |
| Republican gain from Democratic | | | |

== District 1 ==
=== Republican primary ===
==== Candidates ====
===== Nominee =====
- Steven Rudy, incumbent representative

=== General election ===
==== Results ====
2014 Kentucky House of Representatives 1st district election
| Party | Candidate | Votes | % |
|---|---|---|---|
| Republican | Steven Jack Rudy (incumbent) | Unopposed | |
| Total votes | | 13,017 | 100.0 |
| Republican hold | | | |

== District 2 ==
=== Republican primary ===
==== Candidates ====
===== Nominee =====
- Richard Heath, incumbent representative

=== Democratic primary ===
==== Candidates ====
===== Nominee =====
- Jesse Wright

=== General election ===
==== Results ====
2014 Kentucky House of Representatives 2nd district election
| Party | Candidate | Votes | % |
|---|---|---|---|
| Republican | Richard Heath (incumbent) | 9,181 | 59.5 |
| Democratic | Jesse Wright | 6,258 | 40.5 |
| Total votes | | 15,439 | 100.0 |
| Republican hold | | | |

== District 3 ==
=== Democratic primary ===
==== Candidates ====
===== Nominee =====
- Gerald Watkins, incumbent representative

=== Republican primary ===
==== Candidates ====
===== Nominee =====
- Randy Bridges

=== General election ===
==== Results ====
2014 Kentucky House of Representatives 3rd district election
| Party | Candidate | Votes | % |
|---|---|---|---|
| Democratic | Gerald Watkins (incumbent) | 7,153 | 53.6 |
| Republican | Randy Bridges | 6,188 | 46.4 |
| Total votes | | 13,341 | 100.0 |
| Democratic hold | | | |

== District 4 ==
=== Republican primary ===
==== Candidates ====
===== Nominee =====
- Lynn Bechler, incumbent representative

=== Democratic primary ===
==== Candidates ====
===== Nominee =====
- Jarrod H. Jackson

=== General election ===
==== Results ====
2014 Kentucky House of Representatives 4th district election
| Party | Candidate | Votes | % |
|---|---|---|---|
| Republican | Lynn Bechler (incumbent) | 8,328 | 55.2 |
| Democratic | Jarrod H. Jackson | 6,748 | 44.8 |
| Total votes | | 15,076 | 100.0 |
| Republican hold | | | |

== District 5 ==
=== Republican primary ===
==== Candidates ====
===== Nominee =====
- Kenny Imes, incumbent representative

=== General election ===
==== Results ====
2014 Kentucky House of Representatives 5th district election
| Party | Candidate | Votes | % |
|---|---|---|---|
| Republican | Kenny Imes (incumbent) | Unopposed | |
| Total votes | | 12,241 | 100.0 |
| Republican hold | | | |

== District 6 ==
=== Democratic primary ===
==== Candidates ====
===== Nominee =====
- Will Coursey, incumbent representative

=== Republican primary ===
==== Candidates ====
===== Nominee =====
- Keith Travis

=== General election ===
==== Results ====
2014 Kentucky House of Representatives 6th district election
| Party | Candidate | Votes | % |
|---|---|---|---|
| Democratic | Will R. Coursey (incumbent) | 10,041 | 56.5 |
| Republican | Keith Travis | 7,745 | 43.5 |
| Total votes | | 17,786 | 100.0 |
| Democratic hold | | | |

== District 7 ==
=== Republican primary ===
==== Candidates ====
===== Nominee =====
- Suzanne Miles, incumbent representative

=== Democratic primary ===
==== Candidates ====
===== Nominee =====
- John Warren

=== General election ===
==== Results ====
2014 Kentucky House of Representatives 7th district election
| Party | Candidate | Votes | % |
|---|---|---|---|
| Republican | Suzanne Miles (incumbent) | 8,343 | 53.5 |
| Democratic | John Warren | 7,241 | 46.5 |
| Total votes | | 15,584 | 100.0 |
| Republican hold | | | |

== District 8 ==
=== Democratic primary ===
==== Candidates ====
===== Nominee =====
- John Tilley, incumbent representative

=== General election ===
==== Results ====
2014 Kentucky House of Representatives 8th district election
| Party | Candidate | Votes | % |
|---|---|---|---|
| Democratic | John Tilley (incumbent) | Unopposed | |
| Total votes | | 7,400 | 100.0 |
| Democratic hold | | | |

== District 9 ==
Incumbent Republican representative Myron Dossett won reelection. Representative Ben Waide was redistricted into the 9th district from the 10th district but declined to seek reelection.

=== Republican primary ===
==== Candidates ====
===== Nominee =====
- Myron Dossett, incumbent representative

===== Declined =====
- Ben Waide, representative from the 10th district (2011–2015)

=== General election ===
==== Results ====
2014 Kentucky House of Representatives 9th district election
| Party | Candidate | Votes | % |
|---|---|---|---|
| Republican | Myron B. Dossett (incumbent) | Unopposed | |
| Total votes | | 7,770 | 100.0 |
| Republican hold | | | |

== District 10 ==
Incumbent Republican representative Ben Waide was redistricted to the 9th district. Representative Dwight Butler was redistricted into the 10th district from the 18th district but declined to seek reelection.

=== Republican primary ===
==== Candidates ====
===== Nominee =====
- Alan Claypool

===== Eliminated in primary =====
- Brian Key
- Jerry Lloyd Lucas

===== Declined =====
- Dwight Butler, representative from the 18th district (1995–2015)

==== Results ====
Republican primary results
| Party | Candidate | Votes | % |
|---|---|---|---|
| Republican | Alan Claypool | 1,807 | 51.4 |
| Republican | Jerry Lloyd Lucas | 1,359 | 38.6 |
| Republican | Brian Key | 352 | 10.0 |
| Total votes | | 3,518 | 100.0 |

=== Democratic primary ===
==== Candidates ====
===== Nominee =====
- Dean Schamore

=== General election ===
==== Results ====
2014 Kentucky House of Representatives 10th district election
| Party | Candidate | Votes | % |
|---|---|---|---|
| Democratic | Dean Schamore | 8,099 | 53.6 |
| Republican | Alan Claypool | 7,002 | 46.4 |
| Total votes | | 15,101 | 100.0 |
| Democratic gain from Republican | | | |

== District 11 ==
=== Democratic primary ===
==== Candidates ====
===== Nominee =====
- David Watkins, incumbent representative

===== Eliminated in primary =====
- James Buckmaster

==== Results ====
Democratic primary results
| Party | Candidate | Votes | % |
|---|---|---|---|
| Democratic | David A. Watkins (incumbent) | 2,746 | 61.4 |
| Democratic | James Buckmaster | 1,725 | 38.6 |
| Total votes | | 4,471 | 100.0 |

=== Republican primary ===
==== Candidates ====
===== Nominee =====
- Paul A. DeSpain

=== General election ===
==== Results ====
2014 Kentucky House of Representatives 11th district election
| Party | Candidate | Votes | % |
|---|---|---|---|
| Democratic | David A. Watkins (incumbent) | 8,435 | 63.5 |
| Republican | Paul A. DeSpain | 4,856 | 36.5 |
| Total votes | | 13,291 | 100.0 |
| Democratic hold | | | |

== District 12 ==
=== Democratic primary ===
==== Candidates ====
===== Nominee =====
- Jim Gooch Jr., incumbent representative

=== Republican primary ===
==== Candidates ====
===== Nominee =====
- Dianne Burns Mackey

=== General election ===
==== Results ====
2014 Kentucky House of Representatives 12th district election
| Party | Candidate | Votes | % |
|---|---|---|---|
| Democratic | Jim Gooch Jr. (incumbent) | 9,465 | 60.0 |
| Republican | Dianne Burns Mackey | 6,320 | 40.0 |
| Total votes | | 15,785 | 100.0 |
| Democratic hold | | | |

== District 13 ==
=== Democratic primary ===
==== Candidates ====
===== Nominee =====
- Jim Glenn, incumbent representative

===== Eliminated in primary =====
- J. D. Warfield

==== Results ====
Democratic primary results
| Party | Candidate | Votes | % |
|---|---|---|---|
| Democratic | Jim Glenn (incumbent) | 2,378 | 79.7 |
| Democratic | J. D. Warfield | 606 | 20.3 |
| Total votes | | 2,984 | 100.0 |

=== Republican primary ===
==== Candidates ====
===== Nominee =====
- Alan Braden

=== General election ===
==== Results ====
2014 Kentucky House of Representatives 13th district election
| Party | Candidate | Votes | % |
|---|---|---|---|
| Democratic | Jim Glenn (incumbent) | 6,253 | 52.3 |
| Republican | Alan Braden | 5,708 | 47.7 |
| Total votes | | 11,961 | 100.0 |
| Democratic hold | | | |

== District 14 ==
=== Democratic primary ===
==== Candidates ====
===== Nominee =====
- Tommy Thompson, incumbent representative

=== Republican primary ===
==== Candidates ====
===== Nominee =====
- Marian Turley

=== General election ===
==== Results ====
2014 Kentucky House of Representatives 14th district election
| Party | Candidate | Votes | % |
|---|---|---|---|
| Democratic | Tommy Thompson (incumbent) | 10,202 | 61.8 |
| Republican | Marian Turley | 6,315 | 38.2 |
| Total votes | | 16,517 | 100.0 |
| Democratic hold | | | |

== District 15 ==
=== Democratic primary ===
==== Candidates ====
===== Nominee =====
- Brent Yonts, incumbent representative

=== General election ===
==== Results ====
2014 Kentucky House of Representatives 15th district election
| Party | Candidate | Votes | % |
|---|---|---|---|
| Democratic | Brent Yonts (incumbent) | Unopposed | |
| Total votes | | 10,393 | 100.0 |
| Democratic hold | | | |

== District 16 ==
=== Democratic primary ===
==== Candidates ====
===== Nominee =====
- Martha Jane King, incumbent representative

=== Independent candidates ===
- Jason Petrie

=== General election ===
==== Results ====
2014 Kentucky House of Representatives 16th district election
| Party | Candidate | Votes | % |
|---|---|---|---|
| Democratic | Martha Jane King (incumbent) | 6,804 | 59.5 |
| Independent | Jason Petrie | 4,632 | 40.5 |
| Total votes | | 11,436 | 100.0 |
| Democratic hold | | | |

== District 17 ==
Incumbent Republican representative C. B. Embry declined to seek reelection. Representative Jim DeCesare was redistricted into the 17th district from the 21st district.

=== Republican primary ===
==== Candidates ====
===== Nominee =====
- Jim DeCesare, representative from the 21st district (2005–2015)

===== Declined =====
- C. B. Embry, incumbent representative

=== General election ===
==== Results ====
2014 Kentucky House of Representatives 17th district election
| Party | Candidate | Votes | % |
|---|---|---|---|
| Republican | Jim DeCesare | Unopposed | |
| Total votes | | 12,105 | 100.0 |
| Republican hold | | | |

== District 18 ==
Incumbent Republican representative Dwight Butler was redistricted to the 10th district. Representative Tim Moore was redistricted into the 18th district from the 26th district.

=== Republican primary ===
==== Candidates ====
===== Nominee =====
- Tim Moore, representative from the 26th district (2007–2015)

===== Eliminated in primary =====
- Stephen Meredith

==== Results ====
Republican primary results
| Party | Candidate | Votes | % |
|---|---|---|---|
| Republican | Tim Moore | 3,104 | 52.9 |
| Republican | Stephen L. Meredith | 2,762 | 47.1 |
| Total votes | | 5,866 | 100.0 |

=== General election ===
==== Results ====
2014 Kentucky House of Representatives 18th district election
| Party | Candidate | Votes | % |
|---|---|---|---|
| Republican | Tim Moore | Unopposed | |
| Total votes | | 10,636 | 100.0 |
| Republican hold | | | |

== District 19 ==
=== Republican primary ===
==== Candidates ====
===== Nominee =====
- Michael Meredith, incumbent representative

=== Democratic primary ===
==== Candidates ====
===== Nominee =====
- John Wayne Smith

=== General election ===
==== Results ====
2014 Kentucky House of Representatives 19th district election
| Party | Candidate | Votes | % |
|---|---|---|---|
| Republican | Michael Lee Meredith (incumbent) | 8,165 | 62.4 |
| Democratic | John Wayne Smith | 4,914 | 37.6 |
| Total votes | | 13,079 | 100.0 |
| Republican hold | | | |

== District 20 ==
=== Democratic primary ===
==== Candidates ====
===== Nominee =====
- Jody Richards, incumbent representative

=== Republican primary ===
==== Candidates ====
===== Nominee =====
- Jenean Hampton

=== General election ===
==== Results ====
2014 Kentucky House of Representatives 20th district election
| Party | Candidate | Votes | % |
|---|---|---|---|
| Democratic | Jody Richards (incumbent) | 6,237 | 63.3 |
| Republican | Jenean M. Hampton | 3,610 | 36.7 |
| Total votes | | 9,847 | 100.0 |
| Democratic hold | | | |

== District 21 ==
Incumbent Republican representative Jim DeCesare was redistricted to the 17th district. Representative Bart Rowland was redistricted into the 21st district from the 53rd district.

=== Republican primary ===
==== Candidates ====
===== Nominee =====
- Bart Rowland, representative from the 53rd district (2012–2015)

=== Democratic primary ===
==== Candidates ====
===== Nominee =====
- Joe Choate

=== General election ===
==== Results ====
2014 Kentucky House of Representatives 21st district election
| Party | Candidate | Votes | % |
|---|---|---|---|
| Republican | Bart Rowland | 8,613 | 57.4 |
| Democratic | Joe Choate | 6,391 | 42.6 |
| Total votes | | 15,004 | 100.0 |
| Republican hold | | | |

== District 22 ==
=== Democratic primary ===
==== Candidates ====
===== Nominee =====
- Wilson Stone, incumbent representative

=== General election ===
==== Results ====
2014 Kentucky House of Representatives 22nd district election
| Party | Candidate | Votes | % |
|---|---|---|---|
| Democratic | Wilson Stone (incumbent) | Unopposed | |
| Total votes | | 9,893 | 100.0 |
| Democratic hold | | | |

== District 23 ==
=== Democratic primary ===
==== Candidates ====
===== Nominee =====
- Johnny Bell, incumbent representative

=== Republican primary ===
==== Candidates ====
===== Nominee =====
- Jeff Jobe

=== General election ===
==== Results ====
2014 Kentucky House of Representatives 23rd district election
| Party | Candidate | Votes | % |
|---|---|---|---|
| Democratic | Johnny W. Bell (incumbent) | 7,504 | 54.3 |
| Republican | Jeff Jobe | 6,310 | 45.7 |
| Total votes | | 13,814 | 100.0 |
| Democratic hold | | | |

== District 24 ==
=== Democratic primary ===
==== Candidates ====
===== Nominee =====
- Terry Mills, incumbent representative

=== Republican primary ===
==== Candidates ====
===== Nominee =====
- J. Alex LaRue

===== Eliminated in primary =====
- Richard Treitz

==== Results ====
Republican primary results
| Party | Candidate | Votes | % |
|---|---|---|---|
| Republican | J. Alex LaRue | 1,400 | 54.6 |
| Republican | Richard Treitz | 1,166 | 45.4 |
| Total votes | | 2,566 | 100.0 |

=== General election ===
==== Results ====
2014 Kentucky House of Representatives 24th district election
| Party | Candidate | Votes | % |
|---|---|---|---|
| Democratic | Terry Mills (incumbent) | 8,254 | 54.6 |
| Republican | J. Alex LaRue | 6,860 | 45.4 |
| Total votes | | 15,114 | 100.0 |
| Democratic hold | | | |

== District 25 ==
=== Democratic primary ===
==== Candidates ====
===== Nominee =====
- Jimmie Lee, incumbent representative

===== Eliminated in primary =====
- Glenn Fonda

==== Results ====
Democratic primary results
| Party | Candidate | Votes | % |
|---|---|---|---|
| Democratic | Jimmie Lee (incumbent) | 3,295 | 80.9 |
| Democratic | Glenn Fonda | 780 | 19.1 |
| Total votes | | 4,075 | 100.0 |

=== Republican primary ===
==== Candidates ====
===== Nominee =====
- Jim DuPlessis

=== General election ===
==== Results ====
2014 Kentucky House of Representatives 25th district election
| Party | Candidate | Votes | % |
|---|---|---|---|
| Republican | Jim DuPlessis | 7,058 | 50.9 |
| Democratic | Jimmie Lee (incumbent) | 6,810 | 49.1 |
| Total votes | | 13,868 | 100.0 |
| Republican gain from Democratic | | | |

== District 26 ==
Incumbent Republican representative Tim Moore was redistricted to the 18th district. Representative Russell Webber was redistricted into the 26th district from the 49th district.

=== Republican primary ===
==== Candidates ====
===== Nominee =====
- Russell Webber, representative from the 49th district (2013–2015)

===== Eliminated in primary =====
- Alex Wimsatt

==== Results ====
Republican primary results
| Party | Candidate | Votes | % |
|---|---|---|---|
| Republican | Russell Webber | 1,642 | 68.3 |
| Republican | Alex Wimsatt | 763 | 31.7 |
| Total votes | | 2,405 | 100.0 |

=== Democratic primary ===
==== Candidates ====
===== Nominee =====
- J. Scott Wantland

=== General election ===
==== Results ====
2014 Kentucky House of Representatives 26th district election
| Party | Candidate | Votes | % |
|---|---|---|---|
| Republican | Russell Webber | 6,941 | 58.3 |
| Democratic | J. Scott Wantland | 4,972 | 41.7 |
| Total votes | | 11,913 | 100.0 |
| Republican hold | | | |

== District 27 ==
=== Democratic primary ===
==== Candidates ====
===== Nominee =====
- Jeff Greer, incumbent representative

=== Republican primary ===
==== Candidates ====
===== Nominee =====
- Rachelle Frazier

=== General election ===
==== Results ====
2014 Kentucky House of Representatives 27th district election
| Party | Candidate | Votes | % |
|---|---|---|---|
| Democratic | Jeff Greer (incumbent) | 7,036 | 56.8 |
| Republican | Rachelle Frazier | 5,346 | 43.2 |
| Total votes | | 12,382 | 100.0 |
| Democratic hold | | | |

== District 28 ==
=== Democratic primary ===
==== Candidates ====
===== Nominee =====
- Charles Miller, incumbent representative

=== General election ===
==== Results ====
2014 Kentucky House of Representatives 28th district election
| Party | Candidate | Votes | % |
|---|---|---|---|
| Democratic | Charles W. Miller (incumbent) | Unopposed | |
| Total votes | | 7,941 | 100.0 |
| Democratic hold | | | |

== District 29 ==
=== Republican primary ===
==== Candidates ====
===== Nominee =====
- Kevin Bratcher, incumbent representative

=== Democratic primary ===
==== Candidates ====
===== Nominee =====
- Dave Stengel, Commonwealth's Attorney of the 30th Kentucky Circuit Court (1996–2013) and representative from the 29th district (1993–1996)

=== General election ===
==== Results ====
2014 Kentucky House of Representatives 29th district election
| Party | Candidate | Votes | % |
|---|---|---|---|
| Republican | Kevin D. Bratcher (incumbent) | 8,892 | 52.5 |
| Democratic | Dave Stengel | 8,050 | 47.5 |
| Total votes | | 16,942 | 100.0 |
| Republican hold | | | |

== District 30 ==
=== Democratic primary ===
==== Candidates ====
===== Nominee =====
- Tom Burch, incumbent representative

=== General election ===
==== Results ====
2014 Kentucky House of Representatives 30th district election
| Party | Candidate | Votes | % |
|---|---|---|---|
| Democratic | Tom Burch (incumbent) | Unopposed | |
| Total votes | | 9,647 | 100.0 |
| Democratic hold | | | |

== District 31 ==
=== Democratic primary ===
==== Candidates ====
===== Nominee =====
- Steve Riggs, incumbent representative

=== Republican primary ===
==== Candidates ====
===== Nominee =====
- Nicholas X. Simon

=== General election ===
==== Results ====
2014 Kentucky House of Representatives 31st district election
| Party | Candidate | Votes | % |
|---|---|---|---|
| Democratic | Steve Riggs (incumbent) | 9,315 | 60.7 |
| Republican | Nicholas X. Simon | 6,037 | 39.3 |
| Total votes | | 15,352 | 100.0 |
| Democratic hold | | | |

== District 32 ==
=== Republican primary ===
==== Candidates ====
===== Nominee =====
- Phil Moffett, candidate for governor in 2011

===== Eliminated in primary =====
- Shellie May

===== Declined =====
- Julie Raque Adams, incumbent representative

==== Results ====
Republican primary results
| Party | Candidate | Votes | % |
|---|---|---|---|
| Republican | Phil Moffett | 2,036 | 53.1 |
| Republican | Shellie May | 1,797 | 46.9 |
| Total votes | | 3,833 | 100.0 |

=== Democratic primary ===
==== Candidates ====
===== Nominee =====
- Ashley Miller

=== General election ===
==== Results ====
2014 Kentucky House of Representatives 32nd district election
| Party | Candidate | Votes | % |
|---|---|---|---|
| Republican | Phil Moffett | 9,078 | 53.3 |
| Democratic | Ashley Miller | 7,939 | 46.7 |
| Total votes | | 17,017 | 100.0 |
| Republican hold | | | |

== District 33 ==
=== Republican primary ===
==== Candidates ====
===== Nominee =====
- Ronald Crimm, incumbent representative

=== General election ===
==== Results ====
2014 Kentucky House of Representatives 33rd district election
| Party | Candidate | Votes | % |
|---|---|---|---|
| Republican | Ron Crimm (incumbent) | Unopposed | |
| Total votes | | 13,751 | 100.0 |
| Republican hold | | | |

== District 34 ==
=== Democratic primary ===
==== Candidates ====
===== Nominee =====
- Mary Lou Marzian, incumbent representative

=== Republican primary ===
==== Candidates ====
===== Nominee =====
- Michael McNair

=== General election ===
==== Results ====
2014 Kentucky House of Representatives 34th district election
| Party | Candidate | Votes | % |
|---|---|---|---|
| Democratic | Mary Lou Marzian (incumbent) | 13,830 | 69.2 |
| Republican | Michael McNair | 6,160 | 30.8 |
| Total votes | | 19,990 | 100.0 |
| Democratic hold | | | |

== District 35 ==
=== Democratic primary ===
==== Candidates ====
===== Nominee =====
- Jim Wayne, incumbent representative

=== Republican primary ===
==== Candidates ====
===== Nominee =====
- Carl Nett

=== General election ===
==== Results ====
2014 Kentucky House of Representatives 35th district election
| Party | Candidate | Votes | % |
|---|---|---|---|
| Democratic | Jim Wayne (incumbent) | 7,781 | 58.3 |
| Republican | Carl Nett | 5,566 | 41.7 |
| Total votes | | 13,347 | 100.0 |
| Democratic hold | | | |

== District 36 ==
Incumbent Republican representative Jonathan Shell was redistricted to the 71st district, leaving the 36th district without an incumbent.

=== Republican primary ===
==== Candidates ====
===== Nominee =====
- Jerry T. Miller

=== Democratic primary ===
==== Candidates ====
===== Nominee =====
- Debbie Barber

=== General election ===
==== Results ====
2014 Kentucky House of Representatives 36th district election
| Party | Candidate | Votes | % |
|---|---|---|---|
| Republican | Jerry T. Miller | 13,162 | 68.8 |
| Democratic | Debbie Barber | 5,975 | 31.2 |
| Total votes | | 19,137 | 100.0 |
| Republican hold | | | |

== District 37 ==
=== Democratic primary ===
==== Candidates ====
===== Nominee =====
- Jeffery Donohue, incumbent representative

=== General election ===
==== Results ====
2014 Kentucky House of Representatives 37th district election
| Party | Candidate | Votes | % |
|---|---|---|---|
| Democratic | Jeffery M. Donohue (incumbent) | Unopposed | |
| Total votes | | 5,355 | 100.0 |
| Democratic hold | | | |

== District 38 ==
=== Democratic primary ===
==== Candidates ====
===== Nominee =====
- Denver Butler, incumbent representative

=== General election ===
==== Results ====
2014 Kentucky House of Representatives 38th district election
| Party | Candidate | Votes | % |
|---|---|---|---|
| Democratic | Denver "Denny" Butler (incumbent) | Unopposed | |
| Total votes | | 7,320 | 100.0 |
| Democratic hold | | | |

== District 39 ==
=== Democratic primary ===
==== Candidates ====
===== Nominee =====
- Russ Meyer

===== Declined =====
- Robert Damron, incumbent representative

=== Republican primary ===
==== Candidates ====
===== Nominee =====
- Jonah Mitchell

=== General election ===
==== Results ====
2014 Kentucky House of Representatives 39th district election
| Party | Candidate | Votes | % |
|---|---|---|---|
| Democratic | Russ Meyer | 7,836 | 55.6 |
| Republican | Jonah Mitchell | 6,246 | 44.4 |
| Total votes | | 14,082 | 100.0 |
| Democratic hold | | | |

== District 40 ==
=== Democratic primary ===
==== Candidates ====
===== Nominee =====
- Dennis Horlander, incumbent representative

=== Republican primary ===
==== Candidates ====
===== Nominee =====
- Ronald Seiter

=== General election ===
==== Results ====
2014 Kentucky House of Representatives 40th district election
| Party | Candidate | Votes | % |
|---|---|---|---|
| Democratic | Dennis L. Horlander (incumbent) | 7,427 | 73.5 |
| Republican | Ronald Seiter | 2,679 | 26.5 |
| Total votes | | 10,106 | 100.0 |
| Democratic hold | | | |

== District 41 ==
=== Democratic primary ===
==== Candidates ====
===== Nominee =====
- Tom Riner, incumbent representative

=== General election ===
==== Results ====
2014 Kentucky House of Representatives 41st district election
| Party | Candidate | Votes | % |
|---|---|---|---|
| Democratic | Tom Riner (incumbent) | Unopposed | |
| Total votes | | 9,583 | 100.0 |
| Democratic hold | | | |

== District 42 ==
=== Democratic primary ===
==== Candidates ====
===== Nominee =====
- Reginald Meeks, incumbent representative

=== Republican primary ===
==== Candidates ====
===== Nominee =====
- James F. Howland

=== General election ===
==== Results ====
2014 Kentucky House of Representatives 42nd district election
| Party | Candidate | Votes | % |
|---|---|---|---|
| Democratic | Reginald K. Meeks (incumbent) | 11,296 | 87.9 |
| Republican | James F. Howland | 1,558 | 12.1 |
| Total votes | | 12,854 | 100.0 |
| Democratic hold | | | |

== District 43 ==
=== Democratic primary ===
==== Candidates ====
===== Nominee =====
- Darryl Owens, incumbent representative

=== Republican primary ===
==== Candidates ====
===== Nominee =====
- Corley Everett

=== General election ===
==== Results ====
2014 Kentucky House of Representatives 43rd district election
| Party | Candidate | Votes | % |
|---|---|---|---|
| Democratic | Darryl T. Owens (incumbent) | 9,864 | 74.6 |
| Republican | Corley Everett | 3,367 | 25.4 |
| Total votes | | 13,231 | 100.0 |
| Democratic hold | | | |

== District 44 ==
=== Democratic primary ===
==== Candidates ====
===== Nominee =====
- Joni Jenkins, incumbent representative

=== General election ===
==== Results ====
2014 Kentucky House of Representatives 44th district election
| Party | Candidate | Votes | % |
|---|---|---|---|
| Democratic | Joni Jenkins (incumbent) | Unopposed | |
| Total votes | | 9,339 | 100.0 |
| Democratic hold | | | |

== District 45 ==
=== Republican primary ===
==== Candidates ====
===== Nominee =====
- Stan Lee, incumbent representative

=== General election ===
==== Results ====
2014 Kentucky House of Representatives 45th district election
| Party | Candidate | Votes | % |
|---|---|---|---|
| Republican | Stan Lee (incumbent) | Unopposed | |
| Total votes | | 13,716 | 100.0 |
| Republican hold | | | |

== District 46 ==
=== Democratic primary ===
==== Candidates ====
===== Nominee =====
- Larry Clark, incumbent representative

=== Republican primary ===
==== Candidates ====
===== Nominee =====
- David Rainey

=== General election ===
==== Results ====
2014 Kentucky House of Representatives 46th district election
| Party | Candidate | Votes | % |
|---|---|---|---|
| Democratic | Larry Clark (incumbent) | 8,288 | 65.0 |
| Republican | David Rainey | 4,454 | 35.0 |
| Total votes | | 12,742 | 100.0 |
| Democratic hold | | | |

== District 47 ==
=== Democratic primary ===
==== Candidates ====
===== Nominee =====
- Rick Rand, incumbent representative

=== General election ===
==== Results ====
2014 Kentucky House of Representatives 47th district election
| Party | Candidate | Votes | % |
|---|---|---|---|
| Democratic | Rick W. Rand (incumbent) | Unopposed | |
| Total votes | | 11,826 | 100.0 |
| Democratic hold | | | |

== District 48 ==
=== Republican primary ===
==== Candidates ====
===== Nominee =====
- Bob DeWeese, incumbent representative

=== Democratic primary ===
==== Candidates ====
===== Nominee =====
- Gretchen Hunt

=== General election ===
==== Results ====
2014 Kentucky House of Representatives 48th district election
| Party | Candidate | Votes | % |
|---|---|---|---|
| Republican | Bob M. DeWeese (incumbent) | 11,371 | 57.0 |
| Democratic | Gretchen Hunt | 8,562 | 43.0 |
| Total votes | | 19,933 | 100.0 |
| Republican hold | | | |

== District 49 ==
Incumbent Republican representative Russell Webber was redistricted to the 26th district, leaving the 49th district without an incumbent.

=== Republican primary ===
==== Candidates ====
===== Nominee =====
- Michael J. Nemes, representative from the 38th district (2011–2013)

=== Democratic primary ===
==== Candidates ====
===== Nominee =====
- Linda H. Belcher, representative from the 49th district (2009–2013)

===== Eliminated in primary =====
- Jonathan Cacciatore

==== Results ====
Democratic primary results
| Party | Candidate | Votes | % |
|---|---|---|---|
| Democratic | Linda Howlett Belcher | 2,353 | 82.5 |
| Democratic | Jonathan Cacciatore | 499 | 17.5 |
| Total votes | | 2,852 | 100.0 |

=== General election ===
==== Results ====
2014 Kentucky House of Representatives 49th district election
| Party | Candidate | Votes | % |
|---|---|---|---|
| Democratic | Linda Howlett Belcher | 6,675 | 52.9 |
| Republican | Michael J. Nemes | 5,938 | 47.1 |
| Total votes | | 12,613 | 100.0 |
| Democratic gain from Republican | | | |

== District 50 ==
=== Republican primary ===
==== Candidates ====
===== Nominee =====
- David Floyd, incumbent representative

=== Democratic primary ===
==== Candidates ====
===== Nominee =====
- Audrey Haydon

=== General election ===
==== Results ====
2014 Kentucky House of Representatives 50th district election
| Party | Candidate | Votes | % |
|---|---|---|---|
| Republican | David Floyd (incumbent) | 7,933 | 53.3 |
| Democratic | Audrey Haydon | 6,947 | 46.7 |
| Total votes | | 14,880 | 100.0 |
| Republican hold | | | |

== District 51 ==
=== Republican primary ===
==== Candidates ====
===== Nominee =====
- John Carney, incumbent representative

=== General election ===
==== Results ====
2014 Kentucky House of Representatives 51st district election
| Party | Candidate | Votes | % |
|---|---|---|---|
| Republican | John "Bam" Carney (incumbent) | Unopposed | |
| Total votes | | 13,537 | 100.0 |
| Republican hold | | | |

== District 52 ==
=== Republican primary ===
==== Candidates ====
===== Nominee =====
- Ken Upchurch, incumbent representative

===== Eliminated in primary =====
- Jessica A. Burke

==== Results ====
Republican primary results
| Party | Candidate | Votes | % |
|---|---|---|---|
| Republican | Ken Upchurch (incumbent) | 4,959 | 64.0 |
| Republican | Jessica A. Burke | 2,792 | 36.0 |
| Total votes | | 7,751 | 100.0 |

=== General election ===
==== Results ====
2014 Kentucky House of Representatives 52nd district election
| Party | Candidate | Votes | % |
|---|---|---|---|
| Republican | Ken Upchurch (incumbent) | Unopposed | |
| Total votes | | 11,023 | 100.0 |
| Republican hold | | | |

== District 53 ==
Incumbent Republican representative Bart Rowland was redistricted to the 21st district, leaving the 53rd district without an incumbent.

=== Republican primary ===
==== Candidates ====
===== Nominee =====
- James Tipton

=== Democratic primary ===
==== Candidates ====
===== Nominee =====
- Kent Stevens, representative from the 55th district (2009–2011)

===== Eliminated in primary =====
- Donna Crain Drury
- Stewart Gritton

==== Results ====
Democratic primary results
| Party | Candidate | Votes | % |
|---|---|---|---|
| Democratic | Kent Stevens | 3,363 | 56.3 |
| Democratic | Stewart Gritton | 1,423 | 23.8 |
| Democratic | Donna Crain Drury | 1,190 | 19.9 |
| Total votes | | 5,976 | 100.0 |

=== General election ===
==== Results ====
2014 Kentucky House of Representatives 53rd district election
| Party | Candidate | Votes | % |
|---|---|---|---|
| Republican | James A. Tipton | 9,836 | 57.4 |
| Democratic | Kent Stevens | 7,291 | 42.6 |
| Total votes | | 17,127 | 100.0 |
| Republican hold | | | |

== District 54 ==
=== Republican primary ===
==== Candidates ====
===== Nominee =====
- Mike Harmon, incumbent representative

=== General election ===
==== Results ====
2014 Kentucky House of Representatives 54th district election
| Party | Candidate | Votes | % |
|---|---|---|---|
| Republican | Mike Harmon (incumbent) | Unopposed | |
| Total votes | | 10,850 | 100.0 |
| Republican hold | | | |

== District 55 ==
=== Republican primary ===
==== Candidates ====
===== Nominee =====
- Kim King, incumbent representative

=== Democratic primary ===
==== Candidates ====
===== Nominee =====
- Jacqueline Coleman

=== General election ===
==== Results ====
2014 Kentucky House of Representatives 55th district election
| Party | Candidate | Votes | % |
|---|---|---|---|
| Republican | Kim King (incumbent) | 11,110 | 65.2 |
| Democratic | Jacqueline Coleman | 5,927 | 34.8 |
| Total votes | | 17,037 | 100.0 |
| Republican hold | | | |

== District 56 ==
=== Democratic primary ===
==== Candidates ====
===== Nominee =====
- James Kay, incumbent representative

=== Republican primary ===
==== Candidates ====
===== Nominee =====
- Ryan Schwartz

=== General election ===
==== Results ====
2014 Kentucky House of Representatives 56th district election
| Party | Candidate | Votes | % |
|---|---|---|---|
| Democratic | James Kay (incumbent) | 9,668 | 59.8 |
| Republican | Ryan Schwartz | 6,498 | 40.2 |
| Total votes | | 16,166 | 100.0 |
| Democratic hold | | | |

== District 57 ==
=== Democratic primary ===
==== Candidates ====
===== Nominee =====
- Derrick Graham, incumbent representative

=== General election ===
==== Results ====
2014 Kentucky House of Representatives 57th district election
| Party | Candidate | Votes | % |
|---|---|---|---|
| Democratic | Derrick W. Graham (incumbent) | Unopposed | |
| Total votes | | 13,384 | 100.0 |
| Democratic hold | | | |

== District 58 ==
=== Republican primary ===
==== Candidates ====
===== Nominee =====
- Brad Montell, incumbent representative

=== General election ===
==== Results ====
2014 Kentucky House of Representatives 58th district election
| Party | Candidate | Votes | % |
|---|---|---|---|
| Republican | Brad Montell (incumbent) | Unopposed | |
| Total votes | | 11,674 | 100.0 |
| Republican hold | | | |

== District 59 ==
=== Republican primary ===
==== Candidates ====
===== Nominee =====
- David W. Osborne, incumbent representative

=== Democratic primary ===
==== Candidates ====
===== Nominee =====
- James Victor Ewen

=== General election ===
==== Results ====
2014 Kentucky House of Representatives 59th district election
| Party | Candidate | Votes | % |
|---|---|---|---|
| Republican | David W. Osborne (incumbent) | 12,235 | 73.3 |
| Democratic | James Victor Ewen | 4,447 | 26.7 |
| Total votes | | 16,682 | 100.0 |
| Republican hold | | | |

== District 60 ==
=== Republican primary ===
==== Candidates ====
===== Nominee =====
- Sal Santoro, incumbent representative

=== General election ===
==== Results ====
2014 Kentucky House of Representatives 60th district election
| Party | Candidate | Votes | % |
|---|---|---|---|
| Republican | Sal Santoro (incumbent) | Unopposed | |
| Total votes | | 11,506 | 100.0 |
| Republican hold | | | |

== District 61 ==
=== Republican primary ===
==== Candidates ====
===== Nominee =====
- Brian Linder, incumbent representative

=== General election ===
==== Results ====
2014 Kentucky House of Representatives 61st district election
| Party | Candidate | Votes | % |
|---|---|---|---|
| Republican | Brian E. Linder (incumbent) | Unopposed | |
| Total votes | | 10,931 | 100.0 |
| Republican hold | | | |

== District 62 ==
=== Republican primary ===
==== Candidates ====
===== Nominee =====
- Ryan Quarles, incumbent representative

=== Democratic primary ===
==== Candidates ====
===== Nominee =====
- Chuck Tackett

=== General election ===
==== Results ====
2014 Kentucky House of Representatives 62nd district election
| Party | Candidate | Votes | % |
|---|---|---|---|
| Republican | Ryan F. Quarles (incumbent) | 9,163 | 58.7 |
| Democratic | Chuck Tackett | 6,439 | 41.3 |
| Total votes | | 15,602 | 100.0 |
| Republican hold | | | |

== District 63 ==
=== Republican primary ===
==== Candidates ====
===== Nominee =====
- Diane St. Onge, incumbent representative

=== General election ===
==== Results ====
2014 Kentucky House of Representatives 63rd district election
| Party | Candidate | Votes | % |
|---|---|---|---|
| Republican | Diane St. Onge (incumbent) | Unopposed | |
| Total votes | | 12,618 | 100.0 |
| Republican hold | | | |

== District 64 ==
=== Republican primary ===
==== Candidates ====
===== Nominee =====
- Thomas Kerr, incumbent representative

=== General election ===
==== Results ====
2014 Kentucky House of Representatives 64th district election
| Party | Candidate | Votes | % |
|---|---|---|---|
| Republican | Thomas Robert Kerr (incumbent) | Unopposed | |
| Total votes | | 10,670 | 100.0 |
| Republican hold | | | |

== District 65 ==
=== Democratic primary ===
==== Candidates ====
===== Nominee =====
- Arnold Simpson, incumbent representative

=== General election ===
==== Results ====
2014 Kentucky House of Representatives 65th district election
| Party | Candidate | Votes | % |
|---|---|---|---|
| Democratic | Arnold R. Simpson (incumbent) | Unopposed | |
| Total votes | | 6,209 | 100.0 |
| Democratic hold | | | |

== District 66 ==
=== Republican primary ===
==== Candidates ====
===== Nominee =====
- Addia Wuchner, incumbent representative

===== Eliminated in primary =====
- David Martin

==== Results ====
Republican primary results
| Party | Candidate | Votes | % |
|---|---|---|---|
| Republican | Addia Kathryn Wuchner (incumbent) | 2,875 | 60.7 |
| Republican | David Martin | 1,861 | 39.3 |
| Total votes | | 4,736 | 100.0 |

=== General election ===
==== Results ====
2014 Kentucky House of Representatives 66th district election
| Party | Candidate | Votes | % |
|---|---|---|---|
| Republican | Addia Kathryn Wuchner (incumbent) | Unopposed | |
| Total votes | | 11,091 | 100.0 |
| Republican hold | | | |

== District 67 ==
=== Democratic primary ===
==== Candidates ====
===== Nominee =====
- Dennis Keene, incumbent representative

=== General election ===
==== Results ====
2014 Kentucky House of Representatives 67th district election
| Party | Candidate | Votes | % |
|---|---|---|---|
| Democratic | Dennis Keene (incumbent) | Unopposed | |
| Total votes | | 7,350 | 100.0 |
| Democratic hold | | | |

== District 68 ==
=== Republican primary ===
==== Candidates ====
===== Nominee =====
- Joseph Fischer, incumbent representative

=== Democratic primary ===
==== Candidates ====
===== Nominee =====
- Shae Hornback

=== General election ===
==== Results ====
2014 Kentucky House of Representatives 68th district election
| Party | Candidate | Votes | % |
|---|---|---|---|
| Republican | Joseph M. Fischer (incumbent) | 12,606 | 73.5 |
| Democratic | Shae Hornback | 4,535 | 26.5 |
| Total votes | | 17,141 | 100.0 |
| Republican hold | | | |

== District 69 ==
=== Republican primary ===
==== Candidates ====
===== Nominee =====
- Adam Koenig, incumbent representative

=== General election ===
==== Results ====
2014 Kentucky House of Representatives 69th district election
| Party | Candidate | Votes | % |
|---|---|---|---|
| Republican | Adam Koenig (incumbent) | Unopposed | |
| Total votes | | 8,475 | 100.0 |
| Republican hold | | | |

== District 70 ==
=== Democratic primary ===
==== Candidates ====
===== Nominee =====
- Mike Denham, incumbent representative

=== General election ===
==== Results ====
2014 Kentucky House of Representatives 70th district election
| Party | Candidate | Votes | % |
|---|---|---|---|
| Democratic | Mitchel B. "Mike" Denham (incumbent) | Unopposed | |
| Total votes | | 11,362 | 100.0 |
| Democratic hold | | | |

== District 71 ==
Incumbent Democratic representative John Stacy was redistricted to the 97th district. Representative Jonathan Shell was redistricted into the 71st district from the 36th district.

=== Republican primary ===
==== Candidates ====
===== Nominee =====
- Jonathan Shell, representative from the 36th district (2013–2015)

=== General election ===
==== Results ====
2014 Kentucky House of Representatives 71st district election
| Party | Candidate | Votes | % |
|---|---|---|---|
| Republican | Jonathan Shell | Unopposed | |
| Total votes | | 11,915 | 100.0 |
| Republican gain from Democratic | | | |

== District 72 ==
=== Democratic primary ===
==== Candidates ====
===== Nominee =====
- Sannie Overly, incumbent representative

=== Republican primary ===
==== Candidates ====
===== Nominee =====
- Dwaine Curran

=== General election ===
==== Results ====
2014 Kentucky House of Representatives 72nd district election
| Party | Candidate | Votes | % |
|---|---|---|---|
| Democratic | Sannie Overly (incumbent) | 8,846 | 64.9 |
| Republican | Dwaine Curran | 4,794 | 35.1 |
| Total votes | | 13,640 | 100.0 |
| Democratic hold | | | |

== District 73 ==
=== Republican primary ===
==== Candidates ====
===== Nominee =====
- Donna Mayfield, incumbent representative

=== Democratic primary ===
==== Candidates ====
===== Nominee =====
- Bonnie R. Hummel

=== General election ===
==== Results ====
2014 Kentucky House of Representatives 73rd district election
| Party | Candidate | Votes | % |
|---|---|---|---|
| Republican | Donna Mayfield (incumbent) | 8,590 | 60.3 |
| Democratic | Bonnie R. Hummel | 5,656 | 39.7 |
| Total votes | | 14,246 | 100.0 |
| Republican hold | | | |

== District 74 ==
=== Democratic primary ===
==== Candidates ====
===== Nominee =====
- Richard Henderson, incumbent representative

=== Republican primary ===
==== Candidates ====
===== Nominee =====
- David Hale

===== Eliminated in primary =====
- Woody Wells

==== Results ====
Republican primary results
| Party | Candidate | Votes | % |
|---|---|---|---|
| Republican | David Hale | 1,387 | 71.5 |
| Republican | Woody Wells | 552 | 28.5 |
| Total votes | | 1,939 | 100.0 |

=== General election ===
==== Results ====
2014 Kentucky House of Representatives 74th district election
| Party | Candidate | Votes | % |
|---|---|---|---|
| Republican | David Hale | 8,346 | 52.8 |
| Democratic | Richard Henderson (incumbent) | 7,453 | 47.2 |
| Total votes | | 15,799 | 100.0 |
| Republican gain from Democratic | | | |

== District 75 ==
=== Democratic primary ===
==== Candidates ====
===== Nominee =====
- Kelly Flood, incumbent representative

=== General election ===
==== Results ====
2014 Kentucky House of Representatives 75th district election
| Party | Candidate | Votes | % |
|---|---|---|---|
| Democratic | Kelly Flood (incumbent) | Unopposed | |
| Total votes | | 8,407 | 100.0 |
| Democratic hold | | | |

== District 76 ==
=== Democratic primary ===
==== Candidates ====
===== Nominee =====
- Ruth Ann Palumbo, incumbent representative

=== Republican primary ===
==== Candidates ====
===== Nominee =====
- Richard Marris

===== Eliminated in primary =====
- Lavinia Theodoli Spirito

==== Results ====
Republican primary results
| Party | Candidate | Votes | % |
|---|---|---|---|
| Republican | Richard Marris | 1,402 | 60.5 |
| Republican | Lavinia Theodoli Spirito | 915 | 39.5 |
| Total votes | | 2,317 | 100.0 |

=== General election ===
==== Results ====
2014 Kentucky House of Representatives 76th district election
| Party | Candidate | Votes | % |
|---|---|---|---|
| Democratic | Ruth Ann Palumbo (incumbent) | 8,138 | 59.1 |
| Republican | Richard Marris | 5,622 | 40.9 |
| Total votes | | 13,760 | 100.0 |
| Democratic hold | | | |

== District 77 ==
=== Democratic primary ===
==== Candidates ====
===== Nominee =====
- George Brown Jr.

===== Eliminated in primary =====
- Michael Haskins

===== Declined =====
- Jesse Crenshaw, incumbent representative

==== Results ====
Democratic primary results
| Party | Candidate | Votes | % |
|---|---|---|---|
| Democratic | George A. Brown Jr. | 2,403 | 62.0 |
| Democratic | Michael Haskins | 1,474 | 38.0 |
| Total votes | | 3,877 | 100.0 |

=== General election ===
==== Results ====
2014 Kentucky House of Representatives 77th district election
| Party | Candidate | Votes | % |
|---|---|---|---|
| Democratic | George A. Brown Jr. | Unopposed | |
| Total votes | | 8,749 | 100.0 |
| Democratic hold | | | |

== District 78 ==
=== Democratic primary ===
==== Candidates ====
===== Nominee =====
- Tom McKee, incumbent representative

=== Republican primary ===
==== Candidates ====
===== Nominee =====
- Mark Hart

=== General election ===
==== Results ====
2014 Kentucky House of Representatives 78th district election
| Party | Candidate | Votes | % |
|---|---|---|---|
| Democratic | Thomas M. McKee (incumbent) | 6,519 | 54.0 |
| Republican | Mark Hart | 5,550 | 46.0 |
| Total votes | | 12,069 | 100.0 |
| Democratic hold | | | |

== District 79 ==
=== Democratic primary ===
==== Candidates ====
===== Nominee =====
- Susan Westrom, incumbent representative

=== Republican primary ===
==== Candidates ====
===== Nominee =====
- Ken Kearns II

===== Eliminated in primary =====
- George G. Myers

==== Results ====
Republican primary results
| Party | Candidate | Votes | % |
|---|---|---|---|
| Republican | Ken Kearns II | 1,234 | 56.2 |
| Republican | George G. Myers | 960 | 43.8 |
| Total votes | | 2,194 | 100.0 |

=== General election ===
==== Results ====
2014 Kentucky House of Representatives 79th district election
| Party | Candidate | Votes | % |
|---|---|---|---|
| Democratic | Susan Westrom (incumbent) | 8,473 | 61.4 |
| Republican | Ken Kearns II | 5,321 | 38.6 |
| Total votes | | 13,794 | 100.0 |
| Democratic hold | | | |

== District 80 ==
=== Republican primary ===
==== Candidates ====
===== Nominee =====
- David Meade, incumbent representative

=== General election ===
==== Results ====
2014 Kentucky House of Representatives 80th district election
| Party | Candidate | Votes | % |
|---|---|---|---|
| Republican | David Meade (incumbent) | Unopposed | |
| Total votes | | 10,057 | 100.0 |
| Republican hold | | | |

== District 81 ==
=== Democratic primary ===
==== Candidates ====
===== Nominee =====
- Rita Smart, incumbent representative

=== Republican primary ===
==== Candidates ====
===== Nominee =====
- C. Wesley Morgan

=== General election ===
==== Results ====
2014 Kentucky House of Representatives 81st district election
| Party | Candidate | Votes | % |
|---|---|---|---|
| Democratic | Rita H. Smart (incumbent) | 7,318 | 58.6 |
| Republican | C. Wesley Morgan | 5,167 | 41.4 |
| Total votes | | 12,485 | 100.0 |
| Democratic hold | | | |

== District 82 ==
=== Republican primary ===
==== Candidates ====
===== Nominee =====
- Regina Bunch, incumbent representative

===== Eliminated in primary =====
- Eskridge Andy Shelton

==== Results ====
Republican primary results
| Party | Candidate | Votes | % |
|---|---|---|---|
| Republican | Regina Petrey Bunch (incumbent) | 5,330 | 58.7 |
| Republican | Eskridge Andy Shelton | 3,754 | 41.3 |
| Total votes | | 9,084 | 100.0 |

=== General election ===
==== Results ====
2014 Kentucky House of Representatives 82nd district election
| Party | Candidate | Votes | % |
|---|---|---|---|
| Republican | Regina Petrey Bunch (incumbent) | Unopposed | |
| Total votes | | 9,544 | 100.0 |
| Republican hold | | | |

== District 83 ==
=== Republican primary ===
==== Candidates ====
===== Nominee =====
- Jeff Hoover, incumbent representative

=== General election ===
==== Results ====
2014 Kentucky House of Representatives 83rd district election
| Party | Candidate | Votes | % |
|---|---|---|---|
| Republican | Jeff Hoover (incumbent) | Unopposed | |
| Total votes | | 13,667 | 100.0 |
| Republican hold | | | |

== District 84 ==
=== Democratic primary ===
==== Candidates ====
===== Nominee =====
- Fitz Steele, incumbent representative

===== Eliminated in primary =====
- Neal Feltner

==== Results ====
Democratic primary results
| Party | Candidate | Votes | % |
|---|---|---|---|
| Democratic | Fitz Steele (incumbent) | 6,538 | 71.6 |
| Democratic | Neal Feltner | 2,588 | 28.4 |
| Total votes | | 9,126 | 100.0 |

=== General election ===
==== Results ====
2014 Kentucky House of Representatives 84th district election
| Party | Candidate | Votes | % |
|---|---|---|---|
| Democratic | Fitz Steele (incumbent) | Unopposed | |
| Total votes | | 11,234 | 100.0 |
| Democratic hold | | | |

== District 85 ==
=== Republican primary ===
==== Candidates ====
===== Nominee =====
- Tommy Turner, incumbent representative

=== General election ===
==== Results ====
2014 Kentucky House of Representatives 85th district election
| Party | Candidate | Votes | % |
|---|---|---|---|
| Republican | Tommy Turner (incumbent) | Unopposed | |
| Total votes | | 11,601 | 100.0 |
| Republican hold | | | |

== District 86 ==
=== Republican primary ===
==== Candidates ====
===== Nominee =====
- Jim Stewart, incumbent representative

=== General election ===
==== Results ====
2014 Kentucky House of Representatives 86th district election
| Party | Candidate | Votes | % |
|---|---|---|---|
| Republican | Jim Stewart (incumbent) | Unopposed | |
| Total votes | | 11,362 | 100.0 |
| Republican hold | | | |

== District 87 ==
=== Democratic primary ===
==== Candidates ====
===== Nominee =====
- Rick Nelson, incumbent representative

=== General election ===
==== Results ====
2014 Kentucky House of Representatives 87th district election
| Party | Candidate | Votes | % |
|---|---|---|---|
| Democratic | Rick Nelson (incumbent) | Unopposed | |
| Total votes | | 9,742 | 100.0 |
| Democratic hold | | | |

== District 88 ==
=== Republican primary ===
==== Candidates ====
===== Nominee =====
- Robert Benvenuti, incumbent representative

=== Democratic primary ===
==== Candidates ====
===== Nominee =====
- Creasa E. Reed

=== General election ===
==== Results ====
2014 Kentucky House of Representatives 88th district election
| Party | Candidate | Votes | % |
|---|---|---|---|
| Republican | Robert J. Benvenuti III (incumbent) | 11,592 | 64.2 |
| Democratic | Creasa E. Reed | 6,473 | 35.8 |
| Total votes | | 18,065 | 100.0 |
| Republican hold | | | |

== District 89 ==
=== Republican primary ===
==== Candidates ====
===== Nominee =====
- Marie Rader, incumbent representative

===== Eliminated in primary =====
- Michael Bryant
- Gerardo Serrano

==== Results ====
Republican primary results
| Party | Candidate | Votes | % |
|---|---|---|---|
| Republican | Marie L. Rader (incumbent) | 4,881 | 65.4 |
| Republican | Michael Bryant | 2,042 | 27.3 |
| Republican | Gerardo Serrano | 544 | 7.3 |
| Total votes | | 7,467 | 100.0 |

=== Democratic primary ===
==== Candidates ====
===== Nominee =====
- Joey Jayson Taylor II

=== General election ===
==== Results ====
2014 Kentucky House of Representatives 89th district election
| Party | Candidate | Votes | % |
|---|---|---|---|
| Republican | Marie L. Rader (incumbent) | 9,677 | 70.2 |
| Democratic | Joey Jayson Taylor II | 4,116 | 29.8 |
| Total votes | | 13,793 | 100.0 |
| Republican hold | | | |

== District 90 ==
=== Republican primary ===
==== Candidates ====
===== Nominee =====
- Tim Couch, incumbent representative

=== Independent candidates ===
- Darrell D. Mills

=== General election ===
==== Results ====
2014 Kentucky House of Representatives 90th district election
| Party | Candidate | Votes | % |
|---|---|---|---|
| Republican | Tim Couch (incumbent) | 10,335 | 83.6 |
| Independent | Darrell D. Mills | 2,024 | 16.4 |
| Total votes | | 12,359 | 100.0 |
| Republican hold | | | |

== District 91 ==
=== Republican primary ===
==== Candidates ====
===== Nominee =====
- Toby Herald, incumbent representative

=== Democratic primary ===
==== Candidates ====
===== Nominee =====
- Cluster Howard

===== Eliminated in primary =====
- Arch Johnson Jr.

==== Results ====
Democratic primary results
| Party | Candidate | Votes | % |
|---|---|---|---|
| Democratic | Cluster Howard | 3,796 | 53.1 |
| Democratic | Arch Johnson Jr. | 3,350 | 46.9 |
| Total votes | | 7,146 | 100.0 |

=== General election ===
==== Results ====
2014 Kentucky House of Representatives 91st district election
| Party | Candidate | Votes | % |
|---|---|---|---|
| Democratic | Cluster Howard | 6,937 | 50.1 |
| Republican | Gary "Toby" Herald (incumbent) | 6,923 | 49.9 |
| Total votes | | 13,860 | 100.0 |
| Democratic gain from Republican | | | |

== District 92 ==
=== Democratic primary ===
==== Candidates ====
===== Nominee =====
- John Short, incumbent representative

=== General election ===
==== Results ====
2014 Kentucky House of Representatives 92nd district election
| Party | Candidate | Votes | % |
|---|---|---|---|
| Democratic | John W. Short (incumbent) | Unopposed | |
| Total votes | | 9,477 | 100.0 |
| Democratic hold | | | |

== District 93 ==
=== Democratic primary ===
==== Candidates ====
===== Nominee =====
- Chris Harris

===== Eliminated in primary =====
- Keith Hall, incumbent representative

==== Results ====
Democratic primary results
| Party | Candidate | Votes | % |
|---|---|---|---|
| Democratic | Chris Harris | 3,851 | 51.4 |
| Democratic | W. Keith Hall (incumbent) | 3,642 | 48.6 |
| Total votes | | 7,493 | 100.0 |

=== General election ===
==== Results ====
2014 Kentucky House of Representatives 93rd district election
| Party | Candidate | Votes | % |
|---|---|---|---|
| Democratic | Chris Harris | Unopposed | |
| Total votes | | 8,517 | 100.0 |
| Democratic hold | | | |

== District 94 ==
=== Democratic primary ===
==== Candidates ====
===== Nominee =====
- Leslie A. Combs, incumbent representative

=== General election ===
==== Results ====
2014 Kentucky House of Representatives 94th district election
| Party | Candidate | Votes | % |
|---|---|---|---|
| Democratic | Leslie A. Combs (incumbent) | Unopposed | |
| Total votes | | 10,187 | 100.0 |
| Democratic hold | | | |

== District 95 ==
=== Democratic primary ===
==== Candidates ====
===== Nominee =====
- Greg Stumbo, incumbent representative

=== General election ===
==== Results ====
2014 Kentucky House of Representatives 95th district election
| Party | Candidate | Votes | % |
|---|---|---|---|
| Democratic | Gregory D. Stumbo (incumbent) | Unopposed | |
| Total votes | | 10,602 | 100.0 |
| Democratic hold | | | |

== District 96 ==
=== Republican primary ===
==== Candidates ====
===== Nominee =====
- Jill York, incumbent representative

=== Democratic primary ===
==== Candidates ====
===== Nominee =====
- Barry Webb

=== General election ===
==== Results ====
2014 Kentucky House of Representatives 96th district election
| Party | Candidate | Votes | % |
|---|---|---|---|
| Republican | Jill York (incumbent) | 7,541 | 55.7 |
| Democratic | Barry Webb | 5,991 | 44.3 |
| Total votes | | 13,532 | 100.0 |
| Republican hold | | | |

== District 97 ==
Incumbent Democratic representative Hubert Collins won reelection. Representative John Stacy was redistricted into the 97th district from the 71st district but declined to seek reelection.

=== Democratic primary ===
==== Candidates ====
===== Nominee =====
- Hubert Collins, incumbent representative

===== Eliminated in primary =====
- Sid Allen

===== Declined =====
- John Stacy, representative from the 71st district (1993–2015)

==== Results ====
Democratic primary results
| Party | Candidate | Votes | % |
|---|---|---|---|
| Democratic | Hubert Collins (incumbent) | 4,784 | 60.5 |
| Democratic | Sid Allen | 3,127 | 39.5 |
| Total votes | | 7,911 | 100.0 |

=== Republican primary ===
==== Candidates ====
===== Nominee =====
- Bobby McCool

===== Eliminated in primary =====
- Dewie Ison
- Scott Wells

==== Results ====
Republican primary results
| Party | Candidate | Votes | % |
|---|---|---|---|
| Republican | Bobby W. McCool | 1,610 | 46.2 |
| Republican | William Scott Wells | 1,480 | 42.4 |
| Republican | Dewie Ison | 398 | 11.4 |
| Total votes | | 3,488 | 100.0 |

=== General election ===
==== Results ====
2014 Kentucky House of Representatives 97th district election
| Party | Candidate | Votes | % |
|---|---|---|---|
| Democratic | Hubert Collins (incumbent) | 8,915 | 63.2 |
| Republican | Bobby W. McCool | 5,199 | 36.8 |
| Total votes | | 14,114 | 100.0 |
| Democratic hold | | | |

== District 98 ==
=== Democratic primary ===
==== Candidates ====
===== Nominee =====
- Tanya Pullin, incumbent representative

=== General election ===
==== Results ====
2014 Kentucky House of Representatives 98th district election
| Party | Candidate | Votes | % |
|---|---|---|---|
| Democratic | Tanya Pullin (incumbent) | Unopposed | |
| Total votes | | 9,961 | 100.0 |
| Democratic hold | | | |

== District 99 ==
=== Democratic primary ===
==== Candidates ====
===== Nominee =====
- Rocky Adkins, incumbent representative

=== General election ===
==== Results ====
2014 Kentucky House of Representatives 99th district election
| Party | Candidate | Votes | % |
|---|---|---|---|
| Democratic | Rocky Adkins (incumbent) | Unopposed | |
| Total votes | | 9,572 | 100.0 |
| Democratic hold | | | |

== District 100 ==
=== Democratic primary ===
==== Candidates ====
===== Nominee =====
- Kevin Sinnette, incumbent representative

=== General election ===
==== Results ====
2014 Kentucky House of Representatives 100th district election
| Party | Candidate | Votes | % |
|---|---|---|---|
| Democratic | Kevin P. Sinnette (incumbent) | Unopposed | |
| Total votes | | 10,072 | 100.0 |
| Democratic hold | | | |

== See also ==
- 2014 Kentucky elections
  - 2014 Kentucky Senate election
  - 2014 United States Senate election in Kentucky
  - 2014 United States House of Representatives elections in Kentucky
