= Kentucky's 58th House of Representatives district =

American legislative district

Kentucky's 58th State House of Representatives district
Representative
Jennifer Decker; R–Waddy
since January 1, 2021
- Registration: 51.9% Republican; 36.9% Democratic; 10.6% No party preference
- Demographics: 77.2% White; 3.7% Black; 11.6% Hispanic; 0.8% Asian; 0.2% Native American; 0.4% Other; 6.2% Multiracial
- Population (2024): 46,490
- Registered voters (2026): 36,537

Kentucky's 58th House of Representatives district is one of 100 districts in the Kentucky House of Representatives. Located in the central part of the state, it comprises part of Shelby County. It has been represented by Jennifer Decker (R–Waddy) since 2021. As of 2024, the district had a population of 46,490.

== Voter registration ==
On January 1, 2026, the district had 36,537 registered voters, who were registered with the following parties.

Party	Registration	
Party	Voters	%
Republican	18,962	51.90
Democratic	13,486	36.91
Independent	2,006	5.49
Libertarian	179	0.49
Green	25	0.07
Constitution	16	0.04
Reform	5	0.01
Socialist Workers	2	0.01
"Other"	1,856	5.08
Total	36,537	100.00

== List of members representing the district ==
Member	Party	Years	Electoral history	District location
Marshall Long (Shelbyville)	Democratic	January 1, 1982 – January 1, 1999	Elected in 1981. Reelected in 1984. Reelected in 1986. Reelected in 1988. Reelected in 1990. Reelected in 1992. Reelected in 1994. Reelected in 1996. Retired to run for the Kentucky Senate.	1974–1985; Franklin (part), Henry, and Shelby Counties.
Marshall Long (Shelbyville)	Democratic	January 1, 1982 – January 1, 1999	Elected in 1981. Reelected in 1984. Reelected in 1986. Reelected in 1988. Reelected in 1990. Reelected in 1992. Reelected in 1994. Reelected in 1996. Retired to run for the Kentucky Senate.	1985–1993; Henry and Shelby Counties.
Marshall Long (Shelbyville)	Democratic	January 1, 1982 – January 1, 1999	Elected in 1981. Reelected in 1984. Reelected in 1986. Reelected in 1988. Reelected in 1990. Reelected in 1992. Reelected in 1994. Reelected in 1996. Retired to run for the Kentucky Senate.	1993–1997; Henry, Shelby, and Trimble (part) Counties.
Marshall Long (Shelbyville)	Democratic	January 1, 1982 – January 1, 1999	Elected in 1981. Reelected in 1984. Reelected in 1986. Reelected in 1988. Reelected in 1990. Reelected in 1992. Reelected in 1994. Reelected in 1996. Retired to run for the Kentucky Senate.	1997–2003
Gary Tapp (Shelbyville)	Republican	January 1, 1999 – January 1, 2003	Elected in 1998. Reelected in 2000. Retired to run for the Kentucky Senate.	1997–2003
Brad Montell (Shelbyville)	Republican	January 1, 2003 – October 1, 2016	Elected in 2002. Reelected in 2004. Reelected in 2006. Reelected in 2008. Reelected in 2010. Reelected in 2012. Reelected in 2014. Resigned to become deputy secretary of the Kentucky Education and Workforce Development Cabinet.	2003–2015
Brad Montell (Shelbyville)	Republican	January 1, 2003 – October 1, 2016	Elected in 2002. Reelected in 2004. Reelected in 2006. Reelected in 2008. Reelected in 2010. Reelected in 2012. Reelected in 2014. Resigned to become deputy secretary of the Kentucky Education and Workforce Development Cabinet.	2015–2023
Rob Rothenburger (Shelbyville)	Republican	January 1, 2017 – January 1, 2021	Elected in 2016. Reelected in 2018. Retired.	2015–2023
Jennifer Decker (Waddy)	Republican	January 1, 2021 – present	Elected in 2020. Reelected in 2022. Reelected in 2024. Reelected in 2026.	2015–2023
Jennifer Decker (Waddy)	Republican	January 1, 2021 – present	Elected in 2020. Reelected in 2022. Reelected in 2024. Reelected in 2026.	2023–present
