= Heavrin =

Heavrin is a surname of American origin. Notable people with the surname include:

- Amanda Heavrin, American individual in the murder of Shanda Sharer
- Samara Heavrin (born 1992), American politician

== See also ==
- Hearing
- Heaven
