= Eddie Ballard (politician) =

American politician

Member of the Kentucky House of Representatives from the 10th district
- In office January 1, 1987 – January 1, 2011
- Preceded by: William T. Brinkley
- Succeeded by: Ben Waide

Personal details
- Born: December 16, 1929
- Died: May 31, 2011 (aged 81)
- Party: Democratic

Joseph "Eddie" Ballard (December 16, 1929 – May 31, 2011) was an American politician from Kentucky who was a member of the Kentucky House of Representatives from 1987 to 2011. Ballard was first elected in 1986 after incumbent representative William Brinkley retired to for the Kentucky Senate. He did not seek reelection in 2010 and was succeeded by Republican Ben Waide.

Ballard died on May 31, 2011.
