= Marshall Long =

American politician (1936–2018)

Minority Whip of the Kentucky Senate
- In office October 26, 1999 – January 1, 2003
- Preceded by: Elizabeth Tori
- Succeeded by: Bob Jackson

Member of the Kentucky Senate from the 20th district
- In office January 1, 1999 – January 1, 2003
- Preceded by: Fred Bradley
- Succeeded by: Gary Tapp

Member of the Kentucky House of Representatives from the 58th district
- In office January 1, 1982 – January 1, 1999
- Preceded by: Stephen Wilborn
- Succeeded by: Gary Tapp

Personal details
- Born: October 23, 1936 Louisville, Kentucky, U.S.
- Died: December 19, 2018 (aged 82)
- Party: Democratic

David Marshall Long (October 23, 1936 – December 19, 2018) was an American politician in the state of Kentucky.

== Biography ==
Marshall was born in Louisville, Kentucky. He served in the United States Air Force and was commissioned a captain. Marshall received his bachelor's degree from Centre College in 1959. He lived in Shelbyville, Kentucky and was in the real estate business. Long served as mayor of Shelbyville from 1972 to 1981. He served in the Kentucky House of Representatives from 1982 to 1999 and the Kentucky Senate from 1999 to 2003, as a Democrat. A 1998 survey by the Kentucky Center for Public Issues rated Long as the most effective legislator in the house. Long was elected to the senate in 1998 when incumbent Democratic senator Fred Bradley retired. He did not seek reelection in 2002. Long died on December 19, 2018.
