= Gary Tapp =

American politician

Member of the Kentucky Senate from the 20th district
- In office January 1, 2003 – January 1, 2011
- Preceded by: Marshall Long
- Succeeded by: Paul Hornback

Member of the Kentucky House of Representatives from the 58th district
- In office January 1, 1999 – January 1, 2003
- Preceded by: Marshall Long
- Succeeded by: Brad Montell

Personal details
- Born: December 29, 1953 (age 72) Louisville, Kentucky
- Party: Republican

Gary L. Tapp (born December 29, 1953) is an American politician who served in the Kentucky House of Representatives from the 58th district from 1999 to 2003 and in the Kentucky Senate from the 20th district from 2003 to 2011.
