= Chris Fugate =

American politician (born 1969)

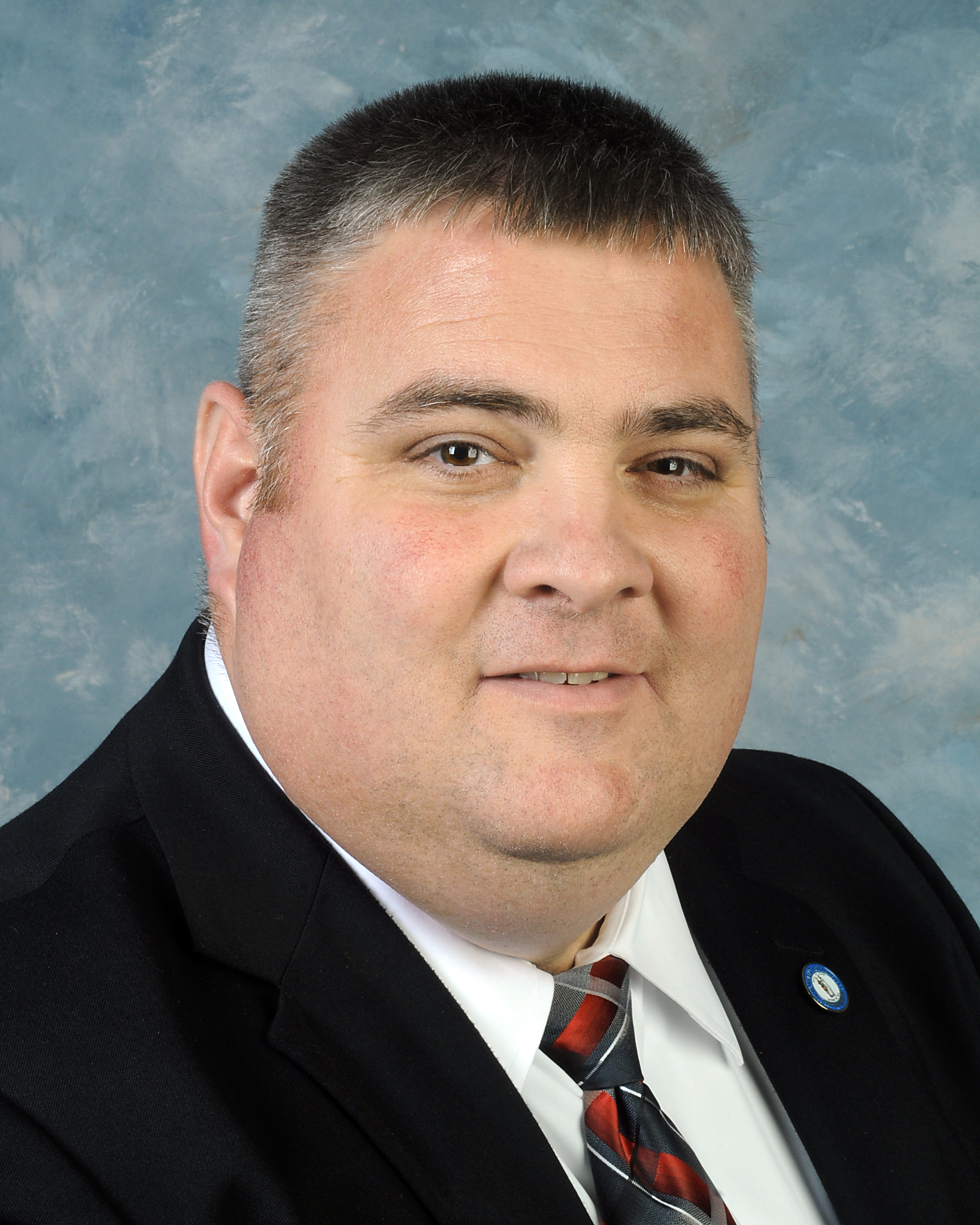

Member of the Kentucky House of Representatives from the 84th district
- Incumbent
- Assumed office January 1, 2017
- Preceded by: Fitz Steele

Personal details
- Born: December 28, 1969 (age 56) Chavies, Kentucky
- Party: Republican
- Occupation: Pastor
- Committees: Budget Review Subcommittee on Econ. Dev., Public Pro., Tour., and Energy (Chair); Appropriations & Revenue; Natural Resources & Energy; Tourism & Outdoor Recreation; Veterans, Military Affairs, & Public Protection

Christopher Wade Fugate (/ˈfjuːɡɪt/ FEW-git; born December 28, 1969) is an American politician and Republican member of the Kentucky House of Representatives from Kentucky's 84th House district. His district includes Breathitt, Owsley, and Perry counties. He also preaches at his church, Gospel Light Baptist Church, in Hazard, Kentucky.

== Background ==
Fugate was born on December 28, 1969, in Chavies, Kentucky. He was employed as a dispatcher for the Kentucky State Police before graduating from the Kentucky State Police Academy and becoming a state trooper.

Currently, Fugate serves as the pastor of Gospel Light Baptist Church in Hazard, Kentucky.

== Political career ==
=== Elections ===
- 2016 Fugate was unopposed in the 2016 Republican primary and won the 2016 Kentucky House of Representatives election with 10,278 votes (63.1%) against Kentucky's 84th House district Democratic incumbent Fitz Steele.
- 2018 Fugate was unopposed in the 2018 Republican primary and won the 2018 Kentucky House of Representatives election with 7,992 votes (55.7%) against Democratic candidate Tom Pope.
- 2020 Fugate was unopposed in the 2020 Republican primary and won the 2020 Kentucky House of Representatives election with 12,098 votes (73.5%) against Democratic candidate Kenneth Hall.
- 2022 Fugate was unopposed in the 2022 Republican primary and won the 2022 Kentucky House of Representatives election with 8,676 votes (68.9%) against Democratic candidate Theresa Combs.
- 2024 Fugate was unopposed in the 2024 Republican primary and won the 2024 Kentucky House of Representatives election with 10,607 votes (65.1%) against Democratic candidate Zackary Hall.
