= Rob Rothenburger =

American politician

Member of the Kentucky House of Representatives from the 58th district
- In office January 1, 2017 – January 1, 2021
- Preceded by: Brad Montell
- Succeeded by: Jennifer Decker

Judge/Executive of Shelby County
- In office January 6, 2003 – January 1, 2017
- Preceded by: Robert Stratton
- Succeeded by: Danny R. Ison

Personal details
- Born: December 18, 1958 (age 67) Louisville, Kentucky
- Party: Republican

Robert A. Rothenburger (born December 18, 1958) is an American politician who served as judge/executive of Shelby County, Kentucky, from 2003 to 2017 and as a member of the Kentucky House of Representatives from Kentucky's 58th House district from 2017 to 2021.

Rothenburger won the 2026 Republican primary for Shelby County judge/executive in 2026 by 167 votes. He has won the November 3rd General Election and will take office in January.
