= Kentucky's 18th House of Representatives district =

American legislative district

Kentucky's 18th State House of Representatives district
Representative
Samara Heavrin; R–Leitchfield
since December 2, 2019
- Registration: 62.6% Republican; 28.5% Democratic; 8.3% No party preference
- Demographics: 93.4% White; 1.6% Black; 2.0% Hispanic; 0.3% Asian; 0.1% Native American; 0.1% Other; 2.5% Multiracial
- Population (2023): 42,733
- Registered voters (2025): 32,739

Kentucky's 18th House of Representatives district is one of 100 districts in the Kentucky House of Representatives. Located in the western part of the state, it comprises the counties of Grayson and part of Hardin. It has been represented by Samara Heavrin (R–Leitchfield) since 2019. As of 2023, the district had a population of 42,733.

== Voter registration ==
On January 1, 2025, the district had 32,739 registered voters, who were registered with the following parties.

Party	Registration	
Party	Voters	%
Republican	20,508	62.64
Democratic	9,331	28.50
Independent	1,139	3.48
Libertarian	132	0.40
Green	20	0.06
Constitution	16	0.05
Socialist Workers	7	0.02
Reform	2	0.01
"Other"	1,584	4.84
Total	32,739	100.00
Source: Kentucky State Board of Elections

== List of members representing the district ==
Member	Party	Years	Electoral history	District location
Mary Ann Tobin (Irvington)	Democratic	January 1, 1976 – January 1984	Elected in 1975. Reelected in 1977. Reelected in 1979. Reelected in 1981. Resigned after being elected Auditor of Kentucky.	1974–1985; Breckinridge and Meade Counties.
Donnie Gedling (Hardinsburg)	Democratic	January 25, 1984 – January 1, 1995	Elected to finish Tobin's term. Reelected in 1984. Reelected in 1986. Reelected in 1988. Reelected in 1990. Reelected in 1992. Retired.	1974–1985; Breckinridge and Meade Counties.
Donnie Gedling (Hardinsburg)	Democratic	January 25, 1984 – January 1, 1995	Elected to finish Tobin's term. Reelected in 1984. Reelected in 1986. Reelected in 1988. Reelected in 1990. Reelected in 1992. Retired.	1985–1993; Breckinridge, Hancock (part), and Meade (part) Counties.
Donnie Gedling (Hardinsburg)	Democratic	January 25, 1984 – January 1, 1995	Elected to finish Tobin's term. Reelected in 1984. Reelected in 1986. Reelected in 1988. Reelected in 1990. Reelected in 1992. Retired.	1993–1997; Breckinridge, Hancock, Hardin (part), and Meade (part) Counties.
Dwight Butler (Harned)	Republican	January 1, 1995 – January 1, 2015	Elected in 1994. Reelected in 1996. Reelected in 1998. Reelected in 2000. Reelected in 2002. Reelected in 2004. Reelected in 2006. Reelected in 2008. Reelected in 2010. Reelected in 2012. Retired after being redistricted to the 10th district.	1993–1997; Breckinridge, Hancock, Hardin (part), and Meade (part) Counties.
Dwight Butler (Harned)	Republican	January 1, 1995 – January 1, 2015	Elected in 1994. Reelected in 1996. Reelected in 1998. Reelected in 2000. Reelected in 2002. Reelected in 2004. Reelected in 2006. Reelected in 2008. Reelected in 2010. Reelected in 2012. Retired after being redistricted to the 10th district.	1997–2003
Dwight Butler (Harned)	Republican	January 1, 1995 – January 1, 2015	Elected in 1994. Reelected in 1996. Reelected in 1998. Reelected in 2000. Reelected in 2002. Reelected in 2004. Reelected in 2006. Reelected in 2008. Reelected in 2010. Reelected in 2012. Retired after being redistricted to the 10th district.	2003–2015
Tim Moore (Elizabethtown)	Republican	January 1, 2015 – September 10, 2019	Redistricted from the 26th district and reelected in 2014. Reelected in 2016. Reelected in 2018. Resigned.	2015–2023
Samara Heavrin (Leitchfield)	Republican	December 2, 2019 – present	Elected to finish Moore's term. Reelected in 2020. Reelected in 2022. Reelected in 2024. Reelected in 2026.	2015–2023
Samara Heavrin (Leitchfield)	Republican	December 2, 2019 – present	Elected to finish Moore's term. Reelected in 2020. Reelected in 2022. Reelected in 2024. Reelected in 2026.	2023–present
