= Jennifer Decker (politician) =

American politician

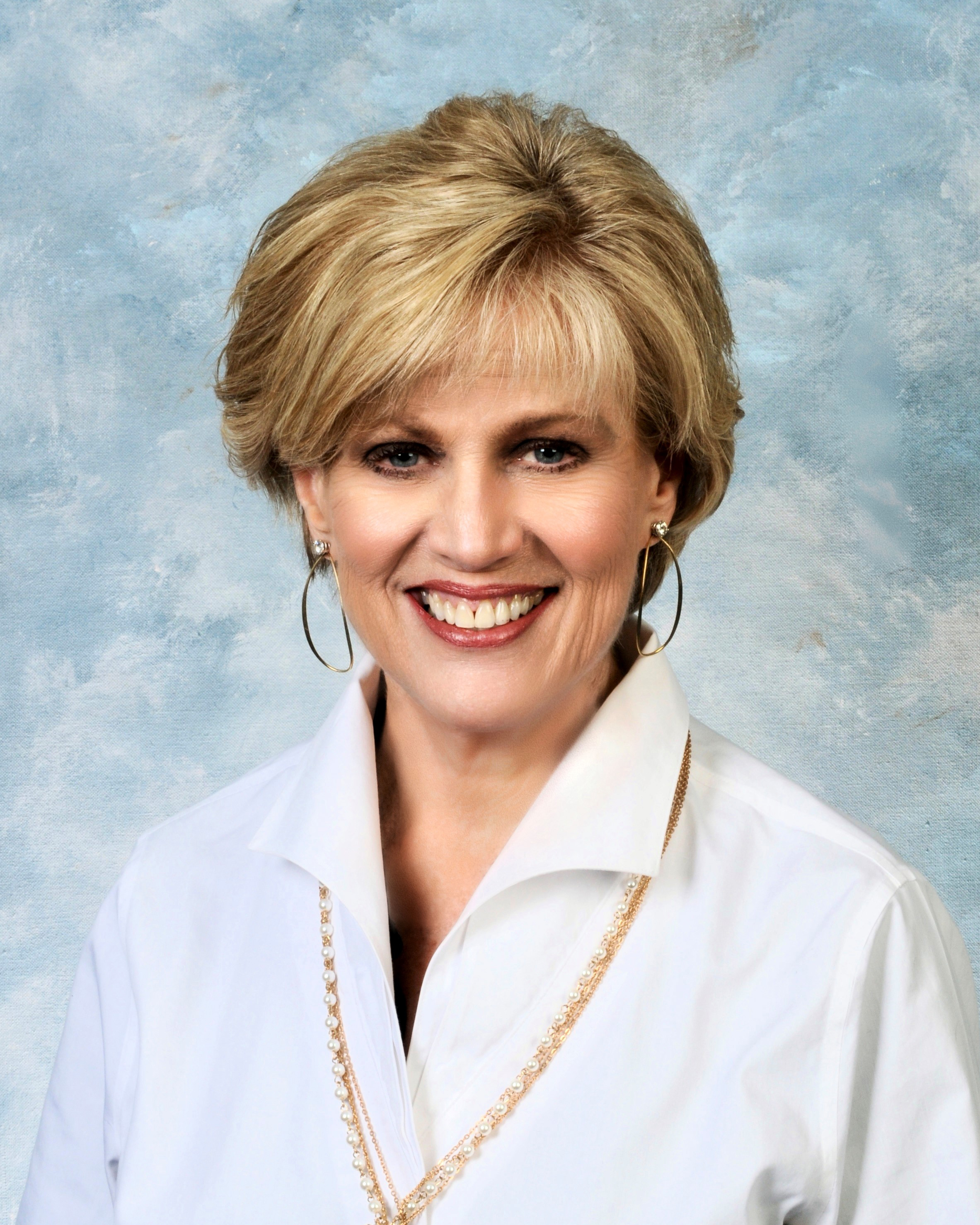

Member of the Kentucky House of Representatives from the 58th district
- Incumbent
- Assumed office January 1, 2021
- Preceded by: Rob Rothenburger

Personal details
- Born: January 19, 1956 (age 70)
- Party: Republican
- Education: Eastern Kentucky University (BA, MA); University of Kentucky College of Law (JD)
- Committees: Judiciary (Vice Chair); Education; Elections, Const. Amendments & Intergovernmental Affairs; Families & Children

Jennifer Henson Decker (born January 19, 1956) is an American politician and Republican member of the Kentucky House of Representatives since January 2021. She represents Kentucky 58th House district which comprises part of Shelby County.

== Background ==
Decker attended Eastern Kentucky University where she was a majorette for four years and member of Kappa Delta Tau, Sigma Tau Delta, and the Wesley Foundation. She earned a Bachelor of Arts in English in 1978 and Master of Arts in 1980, graduating with distinction both times. She would also go on to earn a Juris Doctor from the University of Kentucky College of Law, graduating Order of the Coif in 1982.

Decker worked as a trial attorney for the Internal Revenue Service before opening her own private practice in 2000. She is also the co-owner of Decker Quality Stock, a sheep farm, as well as J&B Investments.

Since 2015, Decker has been the executive director of Operation Care, a Christian-based non-profit and charity organization for those in crisis. She had previously served as a volunteer and member of the organization's board of directors.

== Political career ==
In the 2026 Kentucky General Assembly, Decker was appointed one of five managers in the impeachment trial of judge Julie Goodman.

=== Elections ===
- 2020 Rob Rothenburger, then incumbent representative of Kentucky's 58th House district, chose not to seek reelection. Decker won the 2020 Republican primary with 4,381 votes (75.2%) and won the 2020 Kentucky House of Representatives election with 15,263 votes (65.7%) against Democratic candidate Will Barnett.
- 2022 Decker was unopposed in both the 2022 Republican primary and the 2022 Kentucky House of Representatives election, winning the latter with 12,484 votes.
- 2024 Decker was unopposed in the 2024 Republican primary. On July 30, 2024, Decker's Democratic opponent Richard Henderson was disqualified due to his two filing signatories were not registered Democrats. Henderson stated that he would not appeal the decision, and instead will seek the Democratic nomination for the seat in 2026. As such, Decker was unopposed in the 2024 Kentucky House of Representatives election, winning with 17,330 votes.
