= Scott Alexander (Kentucky politician) =

American politician (born 1970)

Judge/Executive of Perry County
- Incumbent
- Assumed office January 5, 2015
- Preceded by: Denny Ray Noble

Member of the Kentucky House of Representatives from the 84th district
- In office March 21, 2008 – January 1, 2009
- Preceded by: Brandon Smith
- Succeeded by: Fitz Steele
- In office January 1, 1997 – January 1, 2001
- Preceded by: Clarence Noland (redistricting)
- Succeeded by: Brandon Smith

Personal details
- Party: Democratic

Scott Alexander (born 1970) is an American politician from Kentucky currently serving as Judge/Executive of Perry County. Alexander was elected Judge/Executive in 2014, defeating incumbent Denny Ray Noble in the May primary election.

He was previously a member of the Kentucky House of Representatives from 1997 to 2001 and briefly in 2008. He was first elected to the house in 1996, but was defeated for reelection in 2000 by Republican Brandon Smith. He was again elected to the house in a March 2008 special election when Smith was elected to the Kentucky Senate. Alexander faced criticism when he left the state soon after being sworn in, in order to chaperone his daughter's school field trip to Costa Rica.

== Electoral history ==
=== 1996 ===
Democratic primary results
Party	Candidate	Votes	%
Democratic	Scott Alexander	1,121	22.24
Democratic	Culley Abner	1,119	22.20
Democratic	Patrick Strong	1,055	20.9
Democratic	Larry M. Crutcher	890	17.7
Democratic	James Doug Holliday	855	17.0
Total votes		5,040	100.0

1996 Kentucky House of Representatives 84th district election
Party	Candidate	Votes	%
Democratic	Scott Alexander	6,012	57.0
Republican	Bill Morton	4,534	43.0
Total votes		10,546	100.0
Democratic gain from Republican			

=== 1998 ===
Democratic primary results
Party	Candidate	Votes	%
Democratic	Scott Alexander (incumbent)	4,901	55.2
Democratic	Culley Abner	3,971	44.8
Total votes		8,872	100.0

1998 Kentucky House of Representatives 84th district election
Party	Candidate	Votes	%
Democratic	Scott Alexander (incumbent)	Unopposed	
Total votes		7,682	100.0
Democratic hold			

=== 2000 ===
2000 Kentucky House of Representatives 84th district election
Party	Candidate	Votes	%
Republican	Brandon Smith	6,674	54.4
Democratic	Scott Alexander (incumbent)	5,585	45.6
Total votes		12,259	100.0
Republican gain from Democratic			

=== 2006 ===
2006 Kentucky House of Representatives 84th district election
Party	Candidate	Votes	%
Republican	Brandon Smith (incumbent)	6,979	50.14
Democratic	Scott Alexander	6,939	49.86
Total votes		13,918	100.0
Republican hold			

=== 2008 ===
2008 Kentucky Senate 30th district special election
Party	Candidate	Votes	%
Republican	Brandon Smith	10,409	51.0
Democratic	Scott Alexander	10,008	49.0
Total votes		20,417	100.0
Republican gain from Democratic			

2008 Kentucky House of Representatives 84th district special election
Party	Candidate	Votes	%
Democratic	Scott Alexander	Unopposed	
Total votes		691	100.0
Democratic gain from Republican			

=== 2014 ===
Democratic primary results
Party	Candidate	Votes	%
Democratic	Scott Alexander	4,424	62.1
Democratic	Denny Ray Noble (incumbent)	2,702	37.9
Total votes		7,126	100.0

2014 Perry County Judge/Executive election
Party	Candidate	Votes	%
Democratic	Scott Alexander	6,769	71.0
Republican	Eddie N. Campbell	2,770	29.0
Total votes		9,539	100.0
Democratic hold			

=== 2018 ===
Democratic primary results
Party	Candidate	Votes	%
Democratic	Scott Alexander (incumbent)	3,546	58.9
Democratic	Keith Miller	2,477	41.1
Total votes		6,023	100.0

2018 Perry County Judge/Executive election
Party	Candidate	Votes	%
Democratic	Scott Alexander (incumbent)	5,793	58.4
Republican	Denny Ray Noble	4,132	41.6
Total votes		9,925	100.0
Democratic hold			

=== 2022 ===
2022 Perry County Judge/Executive election
Party	Candidate	Votes	%
Democratic	Scott Alexander (incumbent)	Unopposed	
Total votes		5,346	100.0
Democratic hold			
