= Ben Waide =

American politician

Member of the Kentucky House of Representatives from the 10th district
- In office January 1, 2011 – January 1, 2015
- Preceded by: Eddie Ballard
- Succeeded by: Dean Schamore (redistricting)

Personal details
- Born: May 17, 1963 (age 63)
- Party: Republican
- Education: University of Louisville

Forrest Lynn "Ben" Waide (born May 17, 1963) is an American politician and a Republican member of the Kentucky House of Representatives from January 2011 to January 2015, representing District 10. In the 2014 redistricting of the house, the 10th district was redrawn such that Waide lived in the 9th district alongside incumbent Myron Dossett. He did not run for reelection, instead running unsuccessfully for Judge/Executive of Hopkins County.

== Education ==
Waide earned his BS in health sciences from the University of Louisville.

== Elections ==
- 2012: Waide was unopposed for the May 22, 2012 Republican primary and won the November 6, 2012 general election with 9,441 votes (60.4%) against Democratic nominee Mike Seiber.
- 2010: When District 10 Democratic Representative Eddie Ballard retired and left the seat open, Waide was unopposed for the May 18, 2010 Republican Primary and won the November 2, 2010 general election with 7,032 votes (56.4%) against Democratic nominee Michael Duncan.

== Conviction ==
Representative Waide pleaded guilty to violations of campaign laws by using campaign funds for purposes other than his campaign. He was sentenced to 12 months' supervision.
