= Mary Ann Tobin =

American politician (1941–2025)

Auditor of Kentucky
- In office January 2, 1984 – January 4, 1988
- Governor: Martha Layne Collins; Wallace Wilkinson
- Preceded by: James B. Graham
- Succeeded by: Bob Babbage

Member of the Kentucky House of Representatives from the 18th district
- In office January 1, 1976 – January 1984
- Preceded by: Alec Stone
- Succeeded by: Donnie Gedling

Personal details
- Born: July 23, 1941 Guston, Kentucky, U.S.
- Died: June 23, 2025 (aged 83) Irvington, Kentucky, U.S.
- Party: Democratic
- Education: University of Kentucky (BS)
- Website: Campaign website

Mary Ann Tobin (July 23, 1941 – June 23, 2025) was an American politician who was a member of the Kentucky House of Representatives, serving from 1976 to 1984. She served as Kentucky Auditor of Public Accounts from 1984 to 1988. She was a member of the Democratic Party.

== Background ==
Mary Ann Tobin was born to Joseph Dalton Tobin Sr. and Mary Hulett (Broadbent) Tobin on July 23, 1941. She had one brother, Joseph Dalton “Joe” Tobin Jr., who was a regional businessman.

She graduated from the University of Kentucky with a Bachelor of Science degree in accounting. While at UK, she was named the first Ms. Keeneland in 1963. She was also a member of Chi Omega sorority and Beta Alpha Psi honor society.

In later life she was a Sunday School teacher for the Irvington Methodist Church.

Tobin died on June 22, 2025, at the age of 83.

== Political career ==
=== Kentucky House of Representatives ===
In 1975, Tobin was elected to be a member of the Kentucky State House of Representatives from the 18th District which comprised Breckinridge and Meade counties. She served in the House from 1976 to 1984. In her first race, she defeated two other Democrats in the primaries (Lynn Thompson and Wade Glasscock) before she defeated Republican Henry Gibson in the general election (4,287 to 2,915 votes). In 1977, she defeated Keenan O'Connell in the primary election and faced no organized candidate in the general election. In 1979, she ran unopposed in both the primary and general elections. In 1981, she defeated F. Wayne Moore in the primaries but again faced no opposition in the general election. While in the House, she served as Chair of the Capital Construction Oversight Committee as well as worked to update the state's judicial system, automobile title laws, and driver's license plan.

=== Kentucky Auditor of Public Accounts ===
In 1983, Tobin decided to campaign to be the Kentucky Auditor of Public Accounts. In the Democratic Party primary, she beat out Jerry Lundergan, Ed W. Hancock, Tom Ray, Logan Turner, and Doris Faye with 143.836 votes. Lundergan was the second-place finisher with 77,419 votes.

In the general election, she defeated Republican Ronald B. Halleck with 503,954 votes to Halleck's 280,331 votes. She served in the position from 1984 until 1988.

As Auditor, she started a hotline to report fraud and established the Economy and Efficiency Audit Division as a way to try to stop waste in government.

=== Kentucky Senate campaign ===
Tobin sat out of politics for several years but in 1992 she decided to run for the district 5 seats in the Kentucky State Senate. She won the Democratic primary election which had seven candidates. She lost the general election to Republican Virgil Moore by 2,590 votes.

=== 2020 U.S. Senate campaign ===
Tobin ran in the Democratic primary in Kentucky's 2020 election for the U.S. Senate. Tobin placed fourth behind Amy McGrath, Charles Booker, and Mike Broihier.

== Business dealings ==
After leaving politics Tobin focused on her family's, and personal, businesses. She was the co-owner of Broadbent Wildlife Sanctuary in Meade County. She was a part owner of First State Bank located in Irvington, a co-owner of Brandenburg Telephone company and owned a 3,300-acre farm.

Party political offices
Preceded by James B. Graham	Democratic nominee for Kentucky Auditor of Public Accounts; 1983	Succeeded by Bob Babbage
Political offices
Preceded by James B. Graham	Auditor of Kentucky; 1984–1988	Succeeded by Bob Babbage
