= Thomas Kerr (Kentucky politician) =

American politician

Member of the Kentucky House of Representatives from the 64th district
- In office January 1, 1985 – September 16, 2016
- Preceded by: Charles Petty
- Succeeded by: Kimberly Moser

Personal details
- Born: July 25, 1950 (age 76) Covington, Kentucky, United States
- Party: Democratic (until 2003); Republican (2003-present)
- Education: University of Kentucky (BA); Northern Kentucky University (PhD)
- Profession: Attorney
- Website: keepkerr.com

Military service
- Allegiance: United States
- Branch/service: Ohio Air National Guard
- Years of service: 1971–1977

Thomas Robert Kerr (born July 25, 1950) is an American politician and a Republican who served in the Kentucky House of Representatives representing District 64 from 1985 to 2016. He did not run for reelection in 2016 and resigned from the house in September of that year in order to join the administration of governor Matt Bevin.

== Education ==
Kerr earned his BBA from the University of Kentucky and his JD from Northern Kentucky University's Salmon P. Chase College of Law.

== Electoral history ==
- 2012 Kerr was unopposed for both the May 22, 2012 Republican Primary and the November 6, 2012 General election, winning with 16,294 votes.
- 1980s and early 1990s Kerr was initially elected in the 1984 Democratic Primary and the November 6, 1984 General election and re-elected in the general elections of November 4, 1986, November 8, 1988, November 6, 1990, and November 3, 1992.
- 1994 Kerr was unopposed for the 1994 Democratic Primary and won the November 8, 1994 General election against Republican nominee Ernest Robinson.
- 1996 Kerr was unopposed for both the 1996 Democratic Primary and the November 5, 1996 General election.
- 1998 Kerr was unopposed for the 1998 Democratic Primary and won the November 3, 1998 General election against Republican nominee Anita Steffen.
- 2000 Kerr was unopposed for both the 2000 Democratic Primary and the November 7, 2000 General election, winning with 9,853 votes.
- 2002 Kerr was unopposed for both the 2002 Democratic Primary and the November 5, 2002 General election, winning with 5,448 votes.
- 2004 Having changed parties, Kerr was unopposed for both the 2004 Republican Primary and the November 2, 2004 General election, winning with 14,032 votes.
- 2006 Kerr was unopposed for both the 2006 Republican Primary and the November 7, 2006 General election, winning with 8,675 votes after a challenger withdrew.
- 2008 Kerr was challenged in the 2008 Republican Primary, winning with 1,796 votes (67.5%) and was unopposed for the November 4, 2008 General election, winning with 16,093 votes after a challenger withdrew.
- 2010 Kerr was unopposed for both the May 18, 2010 Republican Primary and the November 2, 2010 General election, winning with 10,466 votes.
