= Dwight Butler =

American politician

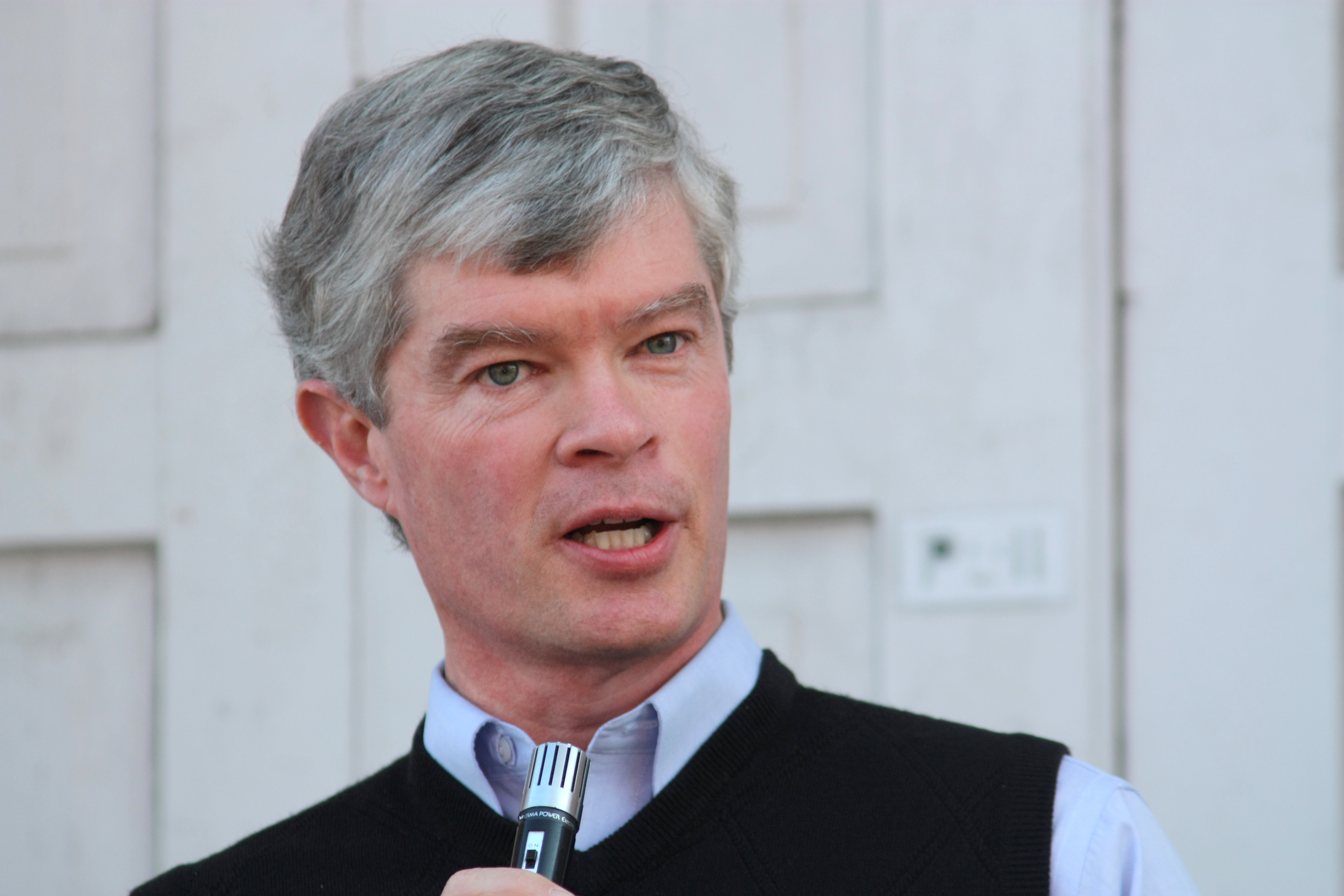

Member of the Kentucky House of Representatives from the 18th district
- In office January 1, 1995 – January 1, 2015
- Preceded by: Donnie Gedling
- Succeeded by: Tim Moore (redistricting)

Personal details
- Born: November 21, 1963 (age 63)
- Party: Republican
- Education: Eastern Kentucky University; Western Kentucky University

Dwight D. Butler (born November 21, 1963) is an American politician and was a Republican member of the Kentucky House of Representatives representing District 18 until January 2015.

== Education ==
Butler earned his BA from Eastern Kentucky University and his MPA from Western Kentucky University.

== Elections ==
- 2012 Butler was unopposed for both the May 22, 2012 Republican Primary and the November 6, 2012 General election, winning with 13,772 votes.
- 1994 Butler was unopposed for the 1994 Republican Primary and won the November 8, 1994 General election against Democratic nominee Donald Gedling.
- 1996 Butler was unopposed for both the 1996 Republican Primary and the November 5, 1996 General election.
- 1998 Butler was unopposed for both the 1998 Republican Primary and the November 3, 1998 General election.
- 2000 Butler was unopposed for both the 2000 Republican Primary and the November 7, 2000 General election, winning with 10,566 votes.
- 2002 Butler was unopposed for both the 2002 Republican Primary and the November 5, 2002 General election, winning with 9,034 votes.
- 2004 Butler was unopposed for the 2004 Republican Primary and won the November 2, 2004 General election with 12,092 votes (69.3%) against Democratic nominee Judy Blair.
- 2006 Butler was unopposed for both the 2006 Republican Primary and the November 7, 2006 General election, winning with 10,075 votes.
- 2008 Butler was unopposed for both the 2008 Republican Primary and the November 4, 2008 General election, winning with 13,411 votes.
- 2010 Butler was unopposed for both the May 18, 2010 Republican Primary and the November 2, 2010 General election, winning with 10,900 votes.

== Final year as Kentucky Representative ==
Dwight Butler, after nearly 2 decades in the same seat, has decided to not run for reelection in 2014. Butler didn't pick anybody to succeed him, and left his seat open for the 2014 campaign. Dean Schamore won his seat in the November 4, 2014 election. Butler only faced challengers to his seat 2 times during his 2 decades in office, and retired without having ever lost an election. Butler said that Kentucky's "General Assembly is more bi-partisan now" than it was when he first arrived in Frankfort (in 1995).
