= Donnie Gedling =

American politician (1939–2024)

Member of the Kentucky House of Representatives from the 18th district
- In office January 25, 1984 – January 1, 1995
- Preceded by: Mary Ann Tobin
- Succeeded by: Dwight Butler

Personal details
- Born: December 9, 1939 Owensboro, Kentucky, U.S.
- Died: December 4, 2024 (aged 84) Owensboro, Kentucky, U.S.
- Party: Democratic
- Spouse: Marilyn Collard
- Children: Donald Joseph Gedling Jr.
- Education: Brescia University
- Profession: Farmer and Politician

Donald Joseph Gedling (December 9, 1939 – December 4, 2024) was an American politician who was the County Clerk for Breckinridge County, Kentucky and a member of the Kentucky House of Representatives from 1984 to 1995, representing the 18th district. He was also a tobacco farmer from Breckinridge County, Kentucky.

== First election and early General Assembly work ==
Gedling was first elected in a January 1984 special election following the resignation of incumbent Mary Ann Tobin to become Kentucky Auditor of Public Accounts. Gedling was later elected to the Kentucky General Assembly in November 1984 when he ran unopposed as a Democrat from Hardinsburg, Kentucky. At the time, the district was composed of Breckinridge County as well as parts of Meade and Hancock Counties. He ran unopposed again in 1986 and 1988.

During this time he served on the House's Agricultural and Small Business Committee and the State Government Committee. He was the Vice Chairman of the Counties and Special Districts Committee. He also served as Chairman of the General Assembly's Tobacco Task Force.

== Later General Assembly work ==
In 1990, Gedling received his first challenge for his seat when Republican James Holbrook ran against him. He defeated Holbrook with 73 percent of the vote. In 1992, he again ran unopposed. By this time, parts of Hardin County had been added to the district.

In the late 1980s and early 1990s Gedling became known as a fierce defender of tobacco and smokers’ rights. In 1990 he was able to get a Smokers’ Bill of Rights bill passed by the Kentucky House of Representatives. During this time he was still the Chairman of the General Assembly's Tobacco Task Force. He was highly critical of the University of Louisville when it became the first state university in Kentucky to have smoking restrictions. He thought it was very hypocritical to take state funds (much of which came from the tobacco industry) and then try to ban the product from areas of campus.

In Gedling's later terms he was a member of the Joint Committee on Agricultural and Natural Resources; the Joint Committee on Counties, Special Districts, and Local Government; the Joint Committee on State Government; the Tobacco Task Force; and a sub-committee for rural fire protection. .

In 1994, Gedling retired and his son, Joey, lost the election to Republican Dwight Butler, 55 percent to 45 percent.

== Personal life ==
Before politics, he had been a social worker for the state of Kentucky and a veteran of the U.S. Army.

Gedling set up a scholarship in his name for any students from Breckinridge or Hancock counties in Kentucky who attend Brescia University in Owensboro, Kentucky after his retirement from politics.

He was a member of St. Rose Catholic Church in Cloverport, Kentucky and the Knights of Columbus.

Gedling died in Owensboro on December 4, 2024, at the age of 84.
