= Fitz Steele =

American politician

Member of the Kentucky House of Representatives from the 84th district
- In office January 1, 2009 – January 1, 2017
- Preceded by: Scott Alexander
- Succeeded by: Chris Fugate

Personal details
- Born: June 19, 1965 (age 61)
- Party: Democratic

Fitz Steele (born June 19, 1965) is a Democratic American politician and who served in the Kentucky House of Representatives representing District 84 from 2009 to 2017. He was defeated for reelection in 2016 by Republican Chris Fugate.

== Elections ==
- 2012 Steele was unopposed for both the May 22, 2012 Democratic Primary and the November 6, 2012 General election, winning with 10,148 votes.
- 2008 When District 84 Republican Representative Brandon Smith ran for Kentucky Senate, Steele won the four-way 2008 Democratic Primary with 3,088 votes (38.1%) and was unopposed for the November 4, 2008 General election with 9,375 votes.
- 2010 Steele was unopposed for both the May 18, 2010 Democratic Primary and also the November 2, 2010 General election, winning with 9,094 votes.
