= Dean Schamore =

American politician

Member of the Kentucky House of Representatives from the 10th district
- In office January 1, 2015 – January 1, 2021
- Preceded by: Ben Waide (redistricting)
- Succeeded by: Josh Calloway

Personal details
- Born: August 19, 1968 (age 57) Hardinsburg, Kentucky, U.S.
- Party: Democratic
- Spouse: Dana Powers Schamore

Military service
- Branch/service: United States Navy
- Battles/wars: Gulf War

Dean Alan Schamore (born August 19, 1968) is an American politician and businessman who served as a member of the Kentucky House of Representatives from the 10th district from 2015 to 2021.

== Early life ==
Schamore was born and raised in Hardinsburg, Kentucky. He served in the United States Navy during the first Gulf War.

== Career ==
In 1993, Schamore founded Digital Connections Plus (DC+) as Dean's Computers Plus. As Dean's Computers Plus, the company's focus was on desktop support and networking. Dean's Computer's largest customer was in manufacturing.

=== Kentucky House of Representatives ===
In 2014, Schamore was elected to the Kentucky House of Representatives, defeating Republican nominee Alan Claypool and succeeding Dwight Butler.

On November 4, 2014, Schamore defeated Claypool in the general election with 8,099 votes (53.6%) to Claypool's 7,002 (46.4%). Schamore was easily reelected in 2016, defeating Republican T. W. Shortt. Schamore went on to win one additional two-year term in 2018 but was beaten by Republican Josh Calloway in the 2020 election.

== Electoral history ==
Kentucky House of Representatives Election, 2014
| Party | Candidate | Votes | % |
|---|---|---|---|
| Democratic | Dean Schamore | 8,099 | 53.6 |
| Republican | Alan Claypool | 7,002 | 46.4 |
| Total votes | | 15,101 | 100.0 |
| Democratic gain from Republican | | | |

Kentucky House of Representatives Election, 2016
| Party | Candidate | Votes | % |
|---|---|---|---|
| Democratic | Dean Schamore (incumbent) | 10,712 | 55.1 |
| Republican | T.W. Shortt | 8,698 | 44.9 |
| Total votes | | 19,410 | 100.0 |
| Democratic hold | | | |

Kentucky House of Representatives Election, 2018
| Party | Candidate | Votes | % |
|---|---|---|---|
| Democratic | Dean Schamore (incumbent) | 8,573 | 51.7 |
| Republican | Josh Calloway | 8,018 | 48.3 |
| Total votes | | 16,591 | 100.0 |
| Democratic hold | | | |
