= Brad Montell =

American politician

Member of the Kentucky House of Representatives from the 58th district
- In office January 1, 2003 – October 1, 2016
- Preceded by: Gary Tapp
- Succeeded by: Rob Rothenburger

Personal details
- Born: December 5, 1956 (age 69) Fayette County, Kentucky
- Party: Republican

William Brad Montell (born December 5, 1956) is an American politician and was a Republican member of the Kentucky House of Representatives representing District 58 from January 2003 to October 2016, when he resigned his seat to accept a position with Governor Matt Bevin's administration.

== Education ==
Montell earned his BA and MA from Western Kentucky University.

== Elections ==
- 2002: With District 58 incumbent Representative Gary Tapp ran for Kentucky Senate, Montell was unopposed for the 2002 Republican Primary and won the November 5, 2002 General election with 7,154 votes (52.1%) against Democratic nominee David Eaton.
- 2004: Montell and returning 2002 Democratic opponent David Eaton both won their 2004 primaries, setting up a rematch; Montell won the November 2, 2004 General election with 11,503 votes (55.3%) against Eaton.
- 2006: Montell was unopposed for the 2006 Republican Primary and won the November 7, 2006 General election with 9,377 votes (55.1%) against Democratic nominee Bill Young.
- 2008: Montell and returning 2006 Democratic challenger Bill Young were both unopposed for their 2008 primaries, setting up a rematch; Montell won the November 4, 2008 General election with 14,064 votes (57.4%) against Young.
- 2010: Montell ran unopposed for both the May 18, 2010 Republican Primary and the November 2, 2010 General election, winning with 15,592 votes.
- 2012: Montell again ran unopposed for both the May 22, 2012 Republican Primary and the November 6, 2012 General election, winning with 19,491 votes.
