= Kentucky's 10th House of Representatives district =

American legislative district

Kentucky's 10th State House of Representatives district
Representative
Josh Calloway; R–Irvington
since January 1, 2021
- Registration: 53.5% Republican; 35.3% Democratic; 10.5% No party preference
- Demographics: 85.8% White; 4.5% Black; 3.0% Hispanic; 0.7% Asian; 0.1% Native American; 0.3% Hawaiian/Pacific Islander; 0.6% Other; 5.1% Multiracial
- Population (2023): 45,838
- Registered voters (2025): 39,194

Kentucky's 10th House of Representatives district is one of 100 districts in the Kentucky House of Representatives. Located in the western part of the state, it comprises Breckinridge and part of Hardin Counties. It has been represented by Josh Calloway (R–Irvington) since 2021. As of 2023, the district had a population of 45,838.

== Voter registration ==
On January 1, 2025, the district had 39,194 registered voters, who were registered with the following parties.

Party	Registration	
Party	Voters	%
Republican	20,977	53.52
Democratic	13,850	35.34
Independent	1,955	4.99
Libertarian	196	0.50
Constitution	34	0.09
Green	25	0.06
Socialist Workers	5	0.01
Reform	0	0.00
"Other"	2,152	5.49
Total	39,194	100.00
Source: Kentucky State Board of Elections

== List of members representing the district ==
Member	Party	Years	Electoral history	District location
William T. Brinkley (Madisonville)	Democratic	November 1974 – January 1, 1987	Elected to finish Troop's term. Reelected in 1975. Reelected in 1977. Reelected in 1979. Reelected in 1981. Reelected in 1984. Retired to run for the Kentucky Senate.	1974–1985; Hopkins County (part).
William T. Brinkley (Madisonville)	Democratic	November 1974 – January 1, 1987	Elected to finish Troop's term. Reelected in 1975. Reelected in 1977. Reelected in 1979. Reelected in 1981. Reelected in 1984. Retired to run for the Kentucky Senate.	1985–1993; Hopkins County (part).
Eddie Ballard (Madisonville)	Democratic	January 1, 1987 – January 1, 2011	Elected in 1986. Reelected in 1988. Reelected in 1990. Reelected in 1992. Reelected in 1994. Reelected in 1996. Reelected in 1998. Reelected in 2000. Reelected in 2002. Reelected in 2004. Reelected in 2006. Reelected in 2008. Retired.	1985–1993; Hopkins County (part).
Eddie Ballard (Madisonville)	Democratic	January 1, 1987 – January 1, 2011	Elected in 1986. Reelected in 1988. Reelected in 1990. Reelected in 1992. Reelected in 1994. Reelected in 1996. Reelected in 1998. Reelected in 2000. Reelected in 2002. Reelected in 2004. Reelected in 2006. Reelected in 2008. Retired.	1993–1997; Hopkins County (part).
Eddie Ballard (Madisonville)	Democratic	January 1, 1987 – January 1, 2011	Elected in 1986. Reelected in 1988. Reelected in 1990. Reelected in 1992. Reelected in 1994. Reelected in 1996. Reelected in 1998. Reelected in 2000. Reelected in 2002. Reelected in 2004. Reelected in 2006. Reelected in 2008. Retired.	1997–2003
Eddie Ballard (Madisonville)	Democratic	January 1, 1987 – January 1, 2011	Elected in 1986. Reelected in 1988. Reelected in 1990. Reelected in 1992. Reelected in 1994. Reelected in 1996. Reelected in 1998. Reelected in 2000. Reelected in 2002. Reelected in 2004. Reelected in 2006. Reelected in 2008. Retired.	2003–2015
Ben Waide (Madisonville)	Republican	January 1, 2011 – January 1, 2015	Elected in 2010. Reelected in 2012. Redistricted to the 9th district and retired to run for Judge/Executive of Hopkins County.	2003–2015
Dean Schamore (Hardinsburg)	Democratic	January 1, 2015 – January 1, 2021	Elected in 2014. Reelected in 2016. Reelected in 2018. Lost reelection.	2015–2023
Josh Calloway (Irvington)	Republican	January 1, 2021 – present	Elected in 2020. Reelected in 2022. Reelected in 2024. Reelected in 2026.	2015–2023
Josh Calloway (Irvington)	Republican	January 1, 2021 – present	Elected in 2020. Reelected in 2022. Reelected in 2024. Reelected in 2026.	2023–present
