= Samara Heavrin =

American politician (born 1992)

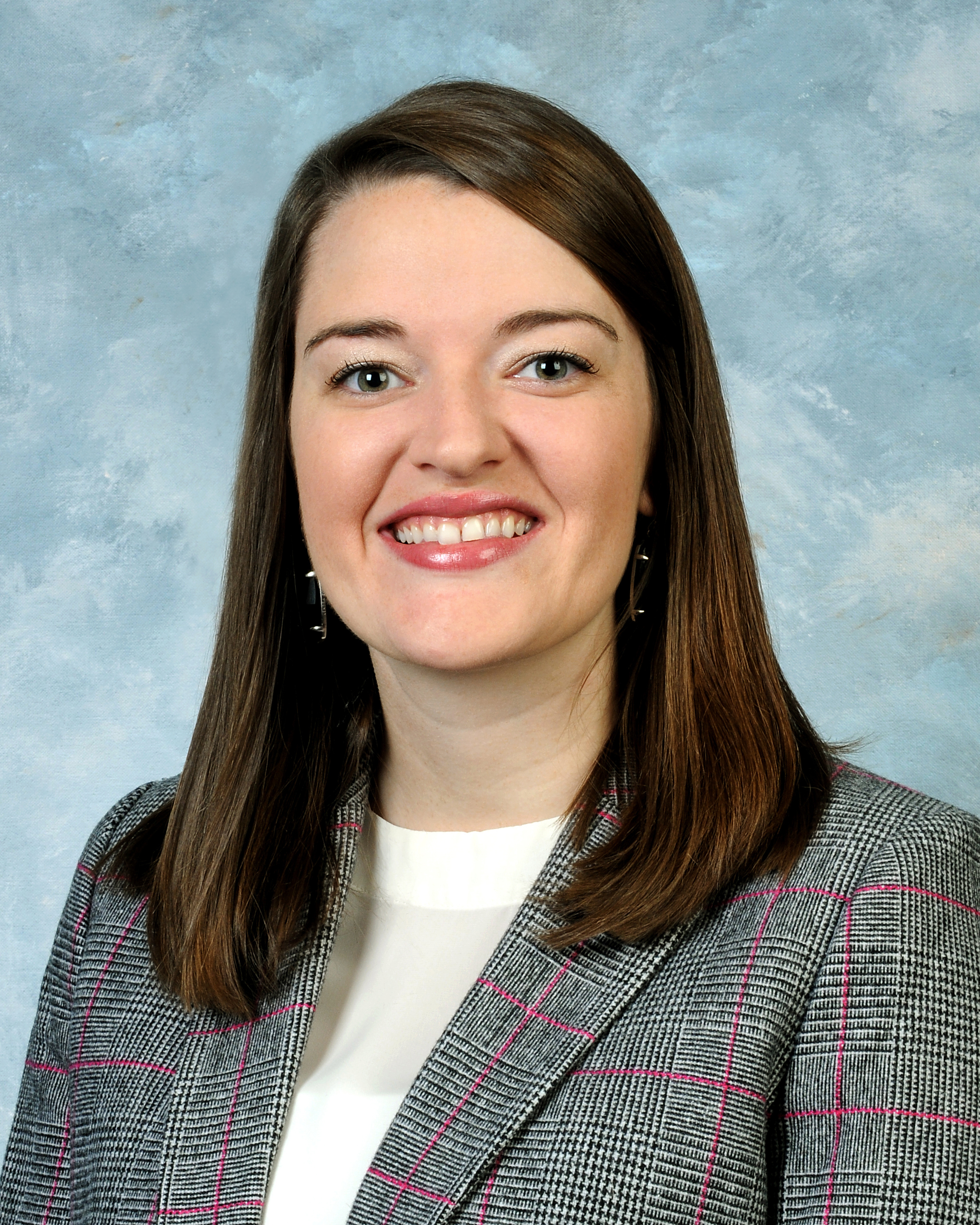

Member of the Kentucky House of Representatives from the 18th district
- Incumbent
- Assumed office December 2, 2019
- Preceded by: Tim Moore

Personal details
- Born: March 12, 1992 (age 34)
- Party: Republican
- Education: Western Kentucky University (BA)
- Committees: Families and Children (Chair); Banking and Insurance; Licensing, Occupations, and Administrative Regulations; Transportation

Samara Rae Heavrin (born March 12, 1992) is an American politician and Republican member of the Kentucky House of Representatives. She represents Kentucky's 18th House district, which includes Grayson County as well as part of Hardin County.

She was elected in a special election in late 2019 after the sudden resignation of Tim Moore, becoming the youngest female state representative in Kentucky history.

== Background ==
Heavrin earned her bachelor's degree from Western Kentucky University in 2014. Following graduation, she was hired to work for Congressman Brett Guthrie in Washington, DC. She served in a variety of roles in his office before being becoming Director of Scheduling. She returned to Kentucky in 2017 to work for the Kentucky State Treasury as Director of Initiatives. She opened her own small business, Barb's Solutions, in 2021.

She serves as a board member of the Grayson County Chamber of Commerce and Owensboro Health Foundation Board.

She is a Catholic.

== Political career ==
=== Elections ===
- 2019 Incumbent Tim Moore of Kentucky's 18th House district resigned to take a position as Director of Lamb and Lion Ministries. Heavrin won the 2019 Kentucky House of Representatives special election with 8,655 votes (60.3%) against Democratic candidate Becky Miller.
- 2020 Heavrin was unopposed in the 2020 Republican primary, and won the 2020 Kentucky House of Representatives election against Libertarian candidate Jacob Clark, winning with 16,409 votes (83%).
- 2022 Heavrin won the 2022 Republican primary with 3,181 votes (57.3%) against challenger Jacob Clark. Heavrin was unopposed in the 2022 Kentucky House of Representatives election, winning with 11,423 votes.
- 2024 Heavrin was unopposed in both the 2024 Republican primary and the 2024 Kentucky House of Representatives election, winning the latter with 17,483 votes.
