= Chuck Tackett =

American politician

Member of the Kentucky House of Representatives from the 62nd district
- In office March 15, 2016 – January 1, 2017
- Preceded by: Ryan Quarles
- Succeeded by: Phillip Pratt

Personal details
- Party: Democratic
- Spouse: Sandra
- Children: 5

Charles "Chuck" Tackett is an American politician from Kentucky who was a member of the Kentucky House of Representatives from March 2016 to January 2017. Tackett was elected in a March 2016 special election following the resignation of Republican incumbent Ryan Quarles to become Kentucky agriculture commissioner. He was defeated in November 2016 by Republican Phillip Pratt in a rematch of the special election.
