= Tim Moore (Kentucky politician) =

American politician (born 1966)

Member of the Kentucky House of Representatives
- In office January 1, 2007 – September 10, 2019
- Preceded by: Mike Weaver
- Succeeded by: Samara Heavrin
- Constituency: 26th district (2007–2015); 18th district (2015–2019)

Personal details
- Born: July 25, 1966 (age 60) Paducah, Kentucky, U.S.
- Party: Republican
- Spouse: Amy Moore
- Children: Julienne Moore, Caleb Moore, Eliza Kate Moore, Miriam Moore
- Education: United States Air Force Academy; University of Arkansas
- Website: mooreforstaterep.info

Military service
- Branch/service: United States Air Force
- Years of service: 1984–1998

Timothy D. Moore (born July 25, 1966) is an American politician and a Republican member of the Kentucky House of Representatives from 2007 to 2019. He resigned in September 2019 and was succeeded by Samara Heavrin.

== Education ==
Moore earned his BS in engineering mechanics from the United States Air Force Academy and his MS in operations management from the University of Arkansas.

== Elections ==
- 2012 Moore was unopposed for both the May 22, 2012 Republican Primary, and the November 6, 2012 General election, winning with 11,179 votes.
- 2006 When District 26 Democratic Representative Mike Weaver left the Legislature and left the seat open, Moore won the 2006 Republican Primary with 1,233 votes (75.6%) and won the November 7, 2006 General election with 4,949 votes (53.0%) against Democratic nominee Jerry Brown.
- 2008 Moore and former Democratic Representative Weaver were both unopposed for their 2008 primaries, but had not been election opponents before; Moore won the November 4, 2008 General election with 7,659 votes (50.4%) against former Representative Moore.
- 2010 Moore was unopposed for the May 18, 2010 Republican Primary and won the November 2, 2010 General election with 6,782 votes (65.8%) against Democratic nominee Allan Francis.
- 2018 Moore's faced first-time runner, Donielle Lovell. Moore won the November 6, 2018 general election with 10,110 votes (nearly 69%) against Lovell.

Political offices
Preceded by Mike Weaver	Member of the Kentucky House of Representatives from the 26th district 2007–2015	Succeeded by Russell Webber
Preceded by Dwight Butler	Member of the Kentucky House of Representatives from the 18th district 2015–2019	Succeeded by Samara Heavrin
