= Arnold Simpson =

American politician (born 1952)

Member of the Kentucky House of Representatives from the 65th district
- In office January 13, 1994 – January 1, 2019
- Preceded by: Martin Sheehan
- Succeeded by: Buddy Wheatley

Personal details
- Born: April 26, 1952 (age 74)
- Party: Democratic
- Education: Kentucky State University; University of Kentucky College of Law
- Profession: Attorney
- Website: arnoldsimpson.com

Arnold Ray Simpson (born April 26, 1952) is an American politician and a former Democratic member of the Kentucky House of Representatives representing District 65 from January 1994 to 2019, when he retired. Simpson was first elected to the house in a January 1994 special election.

== Education ==
Simpson earned his BA from Kentucky State University and his JD from the University of Kentucky College of Law.

== Elections ==
- 1994 Simpson won the 1994 Democratic Primary and the November 8, 1994 General election.
- 1996 Simpson was unopposed for both the 1996 Democratic Primary and the November 5, 1996 General election.
- 1998 Simpson was unopposed for both the 1998 Democratic Primary and the November 3, 1998 General election.
- 2000 Simpson was unopposed for both the 2000 Democratic Primary and the November 7, 2000 General election, winning with 5,738 votes.
- 2002 Simpson was unopposed for both the 2002 Democratic Primary and the November 5, 2002 General election, winning with 4,112 votes.
- 2004 Simpson was unopposed for both the 2004 Democratic Primary and the November 2, 2004 General election, winning with 7,739 votes.
- 2006 Simpson was unopposed for the 2006 Democratic Primary and won the November 7, 2006 General election with 4,628 votes (65.5%) against Republican nominee Ray Murphy.
- 2008 Simpson was unopposed for both the 2008 Democratic Primary and the November 4, 2008 General election, winning with 9,285 votes.
- 2010 Simpson was unopposed for both the May 18, 2010 Democratic Primary and the November 2, 2010 General election, winning with 5,022 votes.
- 2012 Simpson was unopposed for both the May 22, 2012 Democratic Primary and the November 6, 2012 General election, winning with 8,293 votes.
