= Kentucky's 24th House of Representatives district =

American legislative district

Kentucky's 24th State House of Representatives district
Representative
Ryan Bivens; R–Hodgenville
since January 1, 2025
- Registration: 56.9% Republican; 35.2% Democratic; 7.4% No party preference
- Demographics: 91.4% White; 2.9% Black; 2.5% Hispanic; 0.2% Asian; 0.1% Native American; 0.4% Other; 2.6% Multiracial
- Population (2023): 45,776
- Registered voters (2025): 34,255

Kentucky's 24th House of Representatives district is one of 100 districts in the Kentucky House of Representatives. Located in the central part of the state, it comprises the counties of Green, Hart, and LaRue. It has been represented by Ryan Bivens (R–Hodgenville) since 2025. As of 2023, the district had a population of 45,776.

== Voter registration ==
On January 1, 2025, the district had 34,255 registered voters, who were registered with the following parties.

Party	Registration	
Party	Voters	%
Republican	19,481	56.87
Democratic	12,059	35.20
Independent	1,074	3.14
Libertarian	136	0.40
Green	21	0.06
Constitution	12	0.04
Socialist Workers	3	0.01
Reform	3	0.01
"Other"	1,466	4.28
Total	34,255	100.00
Source: Kentucky State Board of Elections

== List of members representing the district ==
Member	Party	Years	Electoral history	District location
David Hourigan (Gravel Switch)	Democratic	January 1, 1987 – December 1993	Elected in 1986. Reelected in 1988. Reelected in 1990. Reelected in 1992. Resigned after being elected Judge/Executive of Marion County.	1985–1993; Hart, Marion, and LaRue (part) Counties.
David Hourigan (Gravel Switch)	Democratic	January 1, 1987 – December 1993	Elected in 1986. Reelected in 1988. Reelected in 1990. Reelected in 1992. Resigned after being elected Judge/Executive of Marion County.	1993–1997; Hart, LaRue (part), Marion, and Washington (part) Counties.
William Scott (Raywick)	Democratic	January 13, 1994 – January 1, 2003	Elected to finish Hourigan's term. Reelected in 1994. Reelected in 1996. Reelected in 1998. Reelected in 2000. Retired.	1993–1997; Hart, LaRue (part), Marion, and Washington (part) Counties.
William Scott (Raywick)	Democratic	January 13, 1994 – January 1, 2003	Elected to finish Hourigan's term. Reelected in 1994. Reelected in 1996. Reelected in 1998. Reelected in 2000. Retired.	1997–2003
Jimmy Higdon (Lebanon)	Republican	January 1, 2003 – December 16, 2009	Elected in 2002. Reelected in 2004. Reelected in 2006. Reelected in 2008. Resigned after being elected to the Kentucky Senate.	2003–2015
Terry Mills (Lebanon)	Democratic	February 8, 2010 – January 1, 2017	Elected to finish Higdon's term. Reelected in 2010. Reelected in 2012. Reelected in 2014. Lost reelection.	2003–2015
Terry Mills (Lebanon)	Democratic	February 8, 2010 – January 1, 2017	Elected to finish Higdon's term. Reelected in 2010. Reelected in 2012. Reelected in 2014. Lost reelection.	2015–2023
Brandon Reed (Hodgenville)	Republican	January 1, 2017 – January 15, 2024	Elected in 2016. Reelected in 2018. Reelected in 2020. Reelected in 2022. Resigned.	2015–2023
Brandon Reed (Hodgenville)	Republican	January 1, 2017 – January 15, 2024	Elected in 2016. Reelected in 2018. Reelected in 2020. Reelected in 2022. Resigned.	2023–present
Courtney Gilbert (Hodgenville)	Republican	March 25, 2024 – January 1, 2025	Elected to finish Reed's term. Retired.	2023–present
Ryan Bivens (Hodgenville)	Republican	January 1, 2025 – present	Elected in 2024. Reelected in 2026.	2023–present
