= 2024 Kentucky House of Representatives election =

- November 5, 2024

All 100 seats in the Kentucky House of Representatives 51 seats needed for a majority
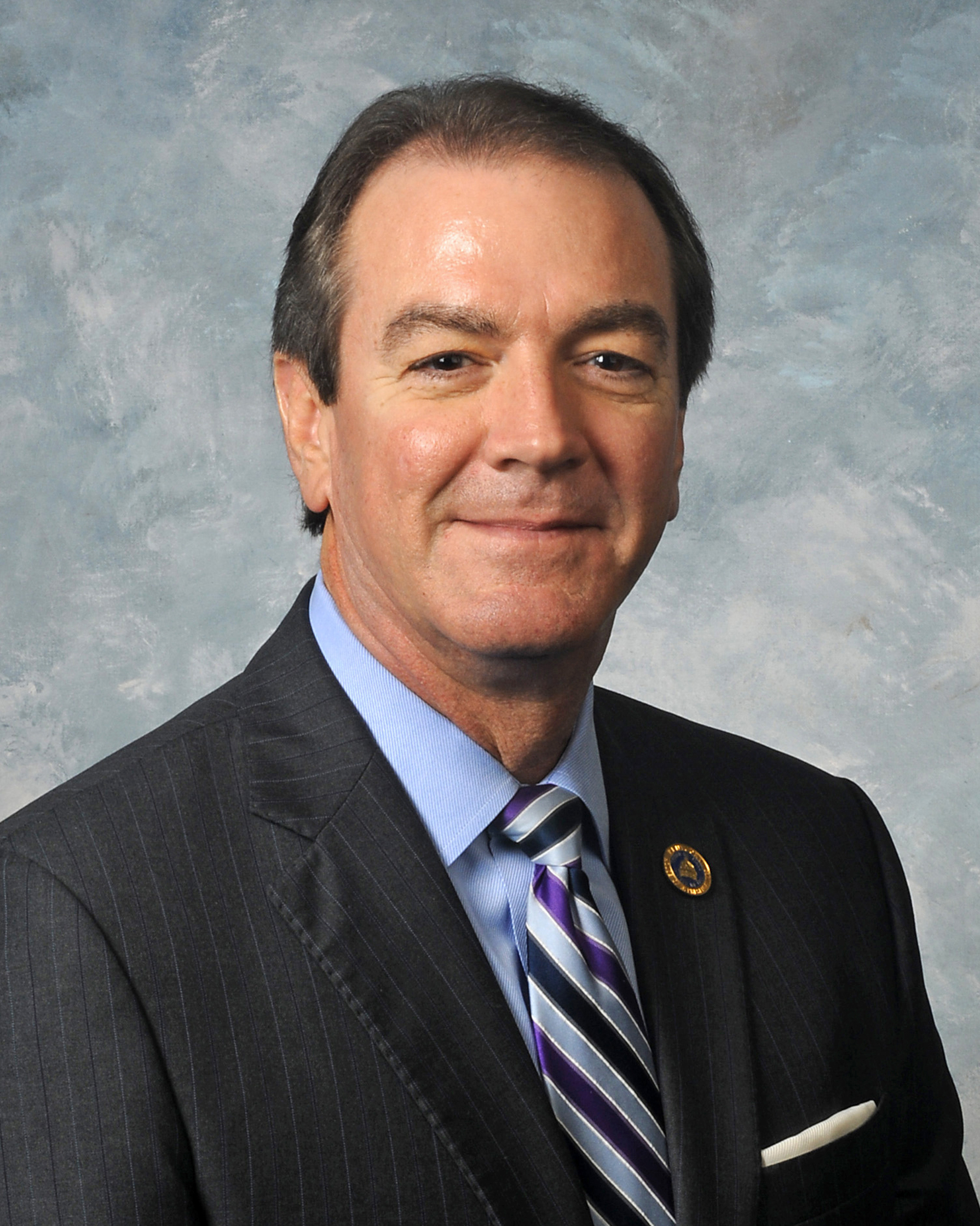

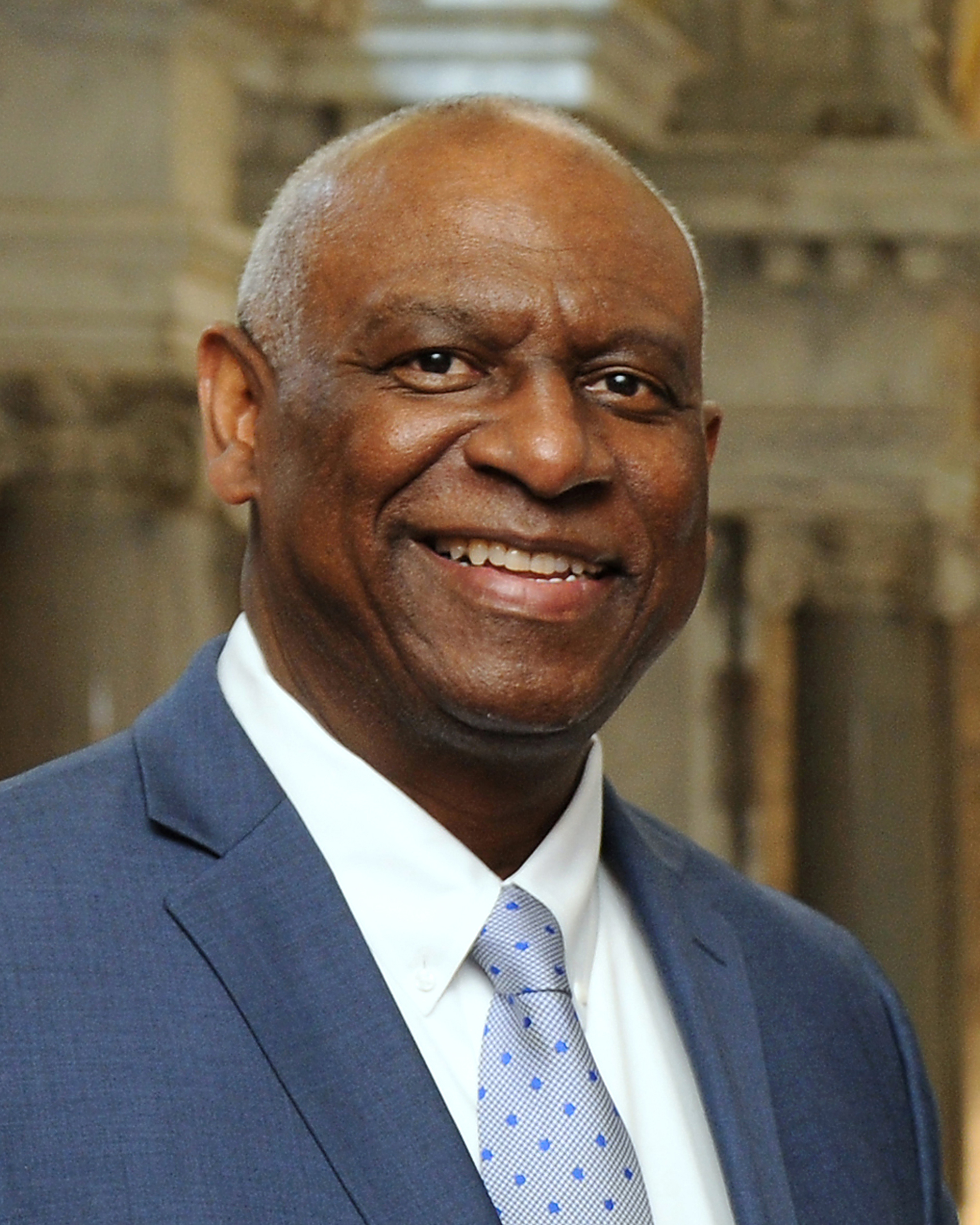
	Majority party	Minority party
Leader	David W. Osborne	Derrick Graham (retired)
Party	Republican	Democratic
Leader since	January 8, 2018	January 3, 2023
Leader's seat	59th – Prospect	57th – Frankfort
Last election	80	20
Seats won	80	20
Seat change	Steady	Steady
- Republican hold Republican gain Democratic hold Democratic gain 50–60% 60–70% 70–80% 80–90% >90% 50–60% 70–80% >90%
Speaker before election
David W. Osborne
Republican
Elected Speaker
David W. Osborne
Republican

The 2024 Kentucky House of Representatives election was held on November 5, 2024. The Republican and Democratic primary elections were held on May 21. Following the 2022 election, Republicans and Democrats held 80 and 20 seats, respectively. The deadline for candidates to file was January 5, 2024. Republicans maintained their majority in the chamber without gaining or losing any seats.

A numbered map of the house districts can be viewed at the Kentucky House of Representatives' website.

== Overview ==
Party	Candidates		Votes	%	Seats		
Party	Opposed	Unopposed	Votes	%	Before	Won	+/−
Republican	45	43	1,291,761	71.35	80	80	-
Democratic	44	12	514,267	28.40	20	20	-
Independent	2	0	4,514	0.25	0	0	-
Total	91	55	1,810,542	100.00	100	100	±0
Source: Kentucky Secretary of State

== Retiring incumbents ==
Retiring incumbents by district Democratic incumbent ran Democratic incumbent retired Republican incumbent ran Republican incumbent retired or lost renomination

A total of 12 representatives (five Democrats and seven Republicans) retired, four of whom (two Democrats and two Republicans) retired to run for other offices.

=== Democratic ===
1. 41st: Josie Raymond (Louisville): Retired to run for the Louisville Metro Council.
2. 42nd: Keturah Herron (Louisville): Retired to run for the 35th senate district.
3. 57th: Derrick W. Graham (Frankfort): Retired.
4. 67th: Rachel Roberts (Newport): Retired.
5. 76th: Ruth Ann Palumbo (Lexington): Retired.

=== Republican ===
1. 11th: Jonathan Dixon (Corydon): Retired.
2. 24th: Courtney Gilbert (Hodgenville): Retired.
3. 29th: Kevin D. Bratcher (Louisville): Retired to run for the Louisville Metro Council.
4. 62nd: Phillip R. Pratt (Georgetown): Retired.
5. 66th: Steve Rawlings (Burlington): Retired to run for the 11th senate district.
6. 94th: Jacob D. Justice (Elkhorn City): Retired.
7. 98th: Danny R. Bentley (Russell): Retired.

== Incumbents defeated ==
Two incumbents lost renomination in the primary election, and one incumbent lost reelection in the general election.

=== In the primary election ===
==== Democrats ====
None.

==== Republicans ====
Two Republicans lost renomination.

1. 2nd: Richard Heath (first elected in 2012) lost renomination to Kimberly Holloway, who won the general election.
2. 45th: Killian Timoney (first elected in 2020) lost renomination to Thomas Jefferson, who lost the general election.

=== In the general election ===
==== Democrats ====
One Democrat lost reelection.

1. 88th: Cherlynn Stevenson (first elected in 2018) lost to Vanessa Grossl.

==== Republicans ====
None.

== Partisan background ==
In the 2020 presidential election, Republican Donald Trump won 81 of 100 districts, while Democratic candidate Joe Biden won 19.

2020 presidential data by house district: Trump: 40–50% 50–60%; 60–70%; 70–80%; 80–90%; Biden: 50–60%; 60–70%; 70–80%; 80–90%

== Crossover seats ==
Five districts voted for one party in the 2020 presidential election and another in the 2022 house election.

=== Democratic ===
This lists the districts in which Donald Trump won in 2020 but were represented by Democrats:

District		Incumbent		
#	Trump margin of victory in 2020	Member	Party	Incumbent margin of victory in 2022
67	R+0.08	Rachel Roberts	Democratic	D+12.27
88	R+4.70	Cherlynn Stevenson	Democratic	D+0.23
95	R+51.14	Ashley Tackett Laferty	Democratic	D+19.67

=== Republican ===
This lists the districts in which Joe Biden won in 2020 but were represented by Republicans:

District		Incumbent		
#	Biden margin of victory in 2020	Member	Party	Incumbent margin of victory in 2022
31	D+3.33	Susan Tyler Witten	Republican	R+4.03
48	D+1.76	Ken Fleming	Republican	R+8.30

== Predictions ==
Source	Ranking	As of
Sabato's Crystal Ball	Safe R	October 23, 2024

== Summary by district ==
† – Incumbent did not seek re-election

District	Incumbent	Party	Elected	Party
1	Steven Jack Rudy	Rep	Steven Jack Rudy	Rep
2	Richard Heath	Rep	Kimberly Holloway	Rep
3	Randy Bridges	Rep	Randy Bridges	Rep
4	D. Wade Williams	Rep	D. Wade Williams	Rep
5	Mary Beth Imes	Rep	Mary Beth Imes	Rep
6	Chris Freeland	Rep	Chris Freeland	Rep
7	Suzanne Miles	Rep	Suzanne Miles	Rep
8	Walker Wood Thomas	Rep	Walker Wood Thomas	Rep
9	Myron B. Dossett	Rep	Myron B. Dossett	Rep
10	Josh Calloway	Rep	Josh Calloway	Rep
11	Jonathan Dixon†	Rep	J. T. Payne	Rep
12	Jim Gooch Jr.	Rep	Jim Gooch Jr.	Rep
13	D. J. Johnson	Rep	D. J. Johnson	Rep
14	Scott Lewis	Rep	Scott Lewis	Rep
15	Rebecca Raymer	Rep	Rebecca Raymer	Rep
16	Jason Petrie	Rep	Jason Petrie	Rep
17	Robert B. Duvall	Rep	Robert B. Duvall	Rep
18	Samara Heavrin	Rep	Samara Heavrin	Rep
19	Michael Lee Meredith	Rep	Michael Lee Meredith	Rep
20	Kevin L. Jackson	Rep	Kevin L. Jackson	Rep
21	Amy Neighbors	Rep	Amy Neighbors	Rep
22	Shawn McPherson	Rep	Shawn McPherson	Rep
23	Steve Riley	Rep	Steve Riley	Rep
24	Courtney Gilbert†	Rep	Ryan Bivens	Rep
25	Steve Bratcher	Rep	Steve Bratcher	Rep
26	Peyton Griffee	Rep	Peyton Griffee	Rep
27	Nancy J. Tate	Rep	Nancy J. Tate	Rep
28	Jared A. Bauman	Rep	Jared A. Bauman	Rep
29	Kevin D. Bratcher†	Rep	Chris Lewis	Rep
30	Daniel Grossberg	Dem	Daniel Grossberg	Dem
31	Susan Tyler Witten	Rep	Susan Tyler Witten	Rep
32	Tina Bojanowski	Dem	Tina Bojanowski	Dem
33	Jason Michael Nemes	Rep	Jason Michael Nemes	Rep
34	Sarah Stalker	Dem	Sarah Stalker	Dem
35	Lisa Willner	Dem	Lisa Willner	Dem
36	John F. Hodgson	Rep	John F. Hodgson	Rep
37	Emily Callaway	Rep	Emily Callaway	Rep
38	Rachel Roarx	Dem	Rachel Roarx	Dem
39	Matt Lockett	Rep	Matt Lockett	Rep
40	Nima Kulkarni	Dem	Nima Kulkarni	Dem
41	Josie Raymond†	Dem	Mary Lou Marzian	Dem
42	Keturah Herron†	Dem	Joshua Watkins	Dem
43	Pamela Stevenson	Dem	Pamela Stevenson	Dem
44	Beverly D. Chester-Burton	Dem	Beverly D. Chester-Burton	Dem
45	Killian Timoney	Rep	Adam Moore	Dem
46	Alan "Al" Gentry	Dem	Alan "Al" Gentry	Dem
47	Felicia Rabourn	Rep	Felicia Rabourn	Rep
48	Ken Fleming	Rep	Ken Fleming	Rep
49	Thomas Huff	Rep	Thomas Huff	Rep
50	Candy Massaroni	Rep	Candy Massaroni	Rep
51	Michael "Sarge" Pollock	Rep	Michael "Sarge" Pollock	Rep
52	Ken Upchurch	Rep	Ken Upchurch	Rep
53	James Allen Tipton	Rep	James Allen Tipton	Rep
54	Daniel B. Elliott	Rep	Daniel B. Elliott	Rep
55	Kim King	Rep	Kim King	Rep
56	Daniel A. Fister	Rep	Daniel A. Fister	Rep
57	Derrick W. Graham†	Dem	Erika Marie Hancock	Dem
58	Jennifer Henson Decker	Rep	Jennifer Henson Decker	Rep
59	David W. Osborne	Rep	David W. Osborne	Rep
60	Marianne Proctor	Rep	Marianne Proctor	Rep
61	Savannah Maddox	Rep	Savannah Maddox	Rep
62	Phillip R. Pratt†	Rep	Tony Hampton	Rep
63	Kim Banta	Rep	Kim Banta	Rep
64	Kimberly Poore Moser	Rep	Kimberly Poore Moser	Rep
65	Stephanie Ann Dietz	Rep	Stephanie Ann Dietz	Rep
66	Steve Rawlings†	Rep	T. J. Roberts	Rep
67	Rachel Roberts†	Dem	Matthew Lehman	Dem
68	Mike Clines	Rep	Mike Clines	Rep
69	Steven Doan	Rep	Steven Doan	Rep
70	William Lee Lawrence	Rep	William Lee Lawrence	Rep
71	Josh Bray	Rep	Josh Bray	Rep
72	Matthew R. Koch	Rep	Matthew R. Koch	Rep
73	D. Ryan Dotson	Rep	D. Ryan Dotson	Rep
74	David Hale	Rep	David Hale	Rep
75	Lindsey Burke	Dem	Lindsey Burke	Dem
76	Ruth Ann Palumbo†	Dem	Anne Gay Donworth	Dem
77	George A. Brown Jr.	Dem	George A. Brown Jr.	Dem
78	Mark Hart	Rep	Mark Hart	Rep
79	Chad Aull	Dem	Chad Aull	Dem
80	David Meade	Rep	David Meade	Rep
81	Deanna Frazier Gordon	Rep	Deanna Frazier Gordon	Rep
82	Nick Wilson	Rep	Nick Wilson	Rep
83	Josh Branscum	Rep	Josh Branscum	Rep
84	Chris Fugate	Rep	Chris Fugate	Rep
85	R. Shane Baker	Rep	R. Shane Baker	Rep
86	Tom O’dell Smith	Rep	Tom O’dell Smith	Rep
87	Adam Bowling	Rep	Adam Bowling	Rep
88	Cherlynn Stevenson	Dem	Vanessa Grossl	Rep
89	Timmy Truett	Rep	Timmy Truett	Rep
90	Derek Lewis	Rep	Derek Lewis	Rep
91	Billy E. Wesley	Rep	Billy E. Wesley	Rep
92	John Blanton	Rep	John Blanton	Rep
93	Adrielle Camuel	Dem	Adrielle Camuel	Dem
94	Jacob D. Justice†	Rep	Mitchum Addison Whitaker	Rep
95	Ashley Tackett Laferty	Dem	Ashley Tackett Laferty	Dem
96	Patrick Flannery	Rep	Patrick Flannery	Rep
97	Bobby W. McCool	Rep	Bobby W. McCool	Rep
98	Danny R. Bentley†	Rep	Aaron Thompson	Rep
99	Richard L. White	Rep	Richard L. White	Rep
100	Scott L. Sharp	Rep	Scott L. Sharp	Rep

== Closest races ==
Seats where the margin of victory was under 10%:

1. District 67, 0.16%
2. District 88, 0.54% (gain)
3. District 45, 0.66% (gain)
4. District 31, 1.43%
5. District 38, 1.44%
6. District 48, 7.48%

== Special elections ==
=== District 93 special ===
Precinct results: Camuel: 50–60%; 60–70%; 70–80%; Whalen: 50–60%; 60–70%

Adrielle Camuel was elected in November 2023 to fill the vacancy caused by the death of Lamin Swann in May 2023.

2023 Kentucky House of Representatives 93rd district special election
Party	Candidate	Votes	%
Democratic	Adrielle Camuel	7,924	57.6
Republican	Kyle Whalen	5,841	42.4
Total votes		13,765	100.0
Democratic hold			

=== District 24 special ===
Courtney Gilbert was elected in March 2024 to fill the vacancy caused by the resignation of Brandon Reed on January 15 in order to become executive director of the Kentucky Office of Agricultural Policy.

2024 Kentucky House of Representatives 24th district special election
Party	Candidate	Votes	%
Republican	Courtney Gilbert	1,025	62.5
Democratic	John Pennington	372	22.7
Write-in	Craig Astor	244	14.9
Total votes		1,641	100.0
Republican hold			

=== District 26 special ===
Peyton Griffee was elected in March 2024 to fill the vacancy caused by the resignation of Russell Webber on January 2 in order to become deputy treasurer in the administration of Mark Metcalf.

2024 Kentucky House of Representatives 26th district special election
Party	Candidate	Votes	%
Republican	Peyton Griffee	Unopposed	
Total votes		75	100.0
Republican hold			

== Predictions ==
Source	Ranking	As of
270toWin	Safe R	November 1, 2024
CNalysis	Solid R	November 1, 2024
Sabato's Crystal Ball	Safe R	June 18, 2024

== District 1 ==
=== Democratic primary ===
==== Candidates ====
===== Nominee =====
- Fredrick Fountain

=== Republican primary ===
==== Candidates ====
===== Nominee =====
- Steven Jack Rudy, incumbent representative and house majority leader

=== General election ===
==== Endorsements ====
Fredrick Fountain (D)

Organizations

- The Fairness Campaign
- Kentucky AFL-CIO
- Kentucky Sierra Club
- United Auto Workers
Steven Jack Rudy (R)

Organizations

- Kentucky Chamber of Commerce
- Kentucky Fraternal Order of Police
- NRA Political Victory Fund

==== Results ====
2024 Kentucky House of Representatives 1st district election
Party	Candidate	Votes	%
Republican	Steven Jack Rudy (incumbent)	16,074	76.7
Democratic	Fredrick Fountain	4,881	23.3
Total votes		20,955	100.0
Republican hold			

== District 2 ==
Incumbent representative Richard Heath was defeated for renomination by Kimberly Holloway.

=== Republican primary ===
==== Candidates ====
===== Nominee =====
- Kimberly Holloway, write-in candidate for this district in 2022

===== Eliminated in primary =====
- Richard Heath, incumbent representative and candidate for agriculture commissioner in 2015 and 2023

==== Endorsements ====
Richard Heath

Organizations

- Kentucky Chamber of Commerce
- Kentucky Right to Life Victory PAC
- NRA Political Victory Fund
Kimberly Holloway

Organizations

- Kentucky Liberty Caucus

==== Fundraising ====
Final campaign finance reports
Candidate	Raised	Spent	Cash on hand
Richard Heath	$79,307.04	$76,882.97	$2,424.07
Kimberly Holloway	$29,715.51	$29,715.51	$0.00
Source: Kentucky Registry of Election Finance

==== Results ====
Republican primary results
Party	Candidate	Votes	%
Republican	Kimberly Holloway	1,904	52.2
Republican	Richard Heath (incumbent)	1,743	47.8
Total votes		3,647	100.0

=== General election ===
==== Results ====
2024 Kentucky House of Representatives 2nd district election
Party	Candidate	Votes	%
Republican	Kimberly Holloway	Unopposed	
Total votes		16,855	100.0
Republican hold			

== District 3 ==
=== Democratic primary ===
==== Candidates ====
===== Nominee =====
- Carrie Gottschalk Singler

=== Republican primary ===
==== Candidates ====
===== Nominee =====
- Randy Bridges, incumbent representative

=== General election ===
==== Endorsements ====
Carrie Gottschalk Singler (D)

Organizations

- Kentucky AFL-CIO
- Kentucky Sierra Club
- United Auto Workers
Randy Bridges (R)

Organizations

- Kentucky Chamber of Commerce
- Kentucky Fraternal Order of Police
- Kentucky Right to Life Victory PAC
- NRA Political Victory Fund

==== Results ====
2024 Kentucky House of Representatives 3rd district election
Party	Candidate	Votes	%
Republican	Randy Bridges (incumbent)	13,455	67.0
Democratic	Carrie Gottschalk Singler	6,632	33.0
Total votes		20,087	100.0
Republican hold			

== District 4 ==
=== Democratic primary ===
==== Candidates ====
===== Nominee =====
- Lloyd Smith

=== Republican primary ===
==== Candidates ====
===== Nominee =====
- D. Wade Williams, incumbent representative

=== General election ===
==== Endorsements ====
Lloyd Smith (D)

Organizations

- Kentucky AFL-CIO
- United Auto Workers
- United Mine Workers of America
D. Wade Williams (R)

Organizations

- Kentucky Chamber of Commerce
- Kentucky Fraternal Order of Police
- NRA Political Victory Fund

==== Results ====
2024 Kentucky House of Representatives 4th district election
Party	Candidate	Votes	%
Republican	D. Wade Williams (incumbent)	15,338	75.4
Democratic	Lloyd Smith	5,008	24.6
Total votes		20,346	100.0
Republican hold			

== District 5 ==
=== Democratic primary ===
==== Candidates ====
===== Nominee =====
- Lauren Hines, teacher

=== Republican primary ===
==== Candidates ====
===== Nominee =====
- Mary Beth Imes, incumbent representative

=== General election ===
==== Endorsements ====
Lauren Hines (D)

Organizations

- Emerge Kentucky
- The Fairness Campaign
- Kentucky AFL-CIO
- United Auto Workers
Mary Beth Imes (R)

Organizations

- Kentucky Chamber of Commerce
- Kentucky Fraternal Order of Police
- Kentucky Right to Life Victory PAC
- NRA Political Victory Fund

==== Results ====
2024 Kentucky House of Representatives 5th district election
Party	Candidate	Votes	%
Republican	Mary Beth Imes (incumbent)	13,247	65.5
Democratic	Lauren Hines	6,977	34.5
Total votes		20,224	100.0
Republican hold			

== District 6 ==
=== Democratic primary ===
==== Candidates ====
===== Nominee =====
- Linda Story Edwards, Democratic nominee for this district in 2018 and candidate for the Democratic nomination in 2020

=== Republican primary ===
==== Candidates ====
===== Nominee =====
- Chris Freeland, incumbent representative

=== General election ===
==== Endorsements ====
Linda Story Edwards (D)

Organizations

- Kentucky AFL-CIO
- United Auto Workers
Chris Freeland (R)

Organizations

- Kentucky Chamber of Commerce
- Kentucky Fraternal Order of Police
- Kentucky Right to Life Victory PAC
- NRA Political Victory Fund

==== Results ====
2024 Kentucky House of Representatives 6th district election
Party	Candidate	Votes	%
Republican	Chris Freeland (incumbent)	17,949	76.9
Democratic	Linda Story Edwards	5,405	23.1
Total votes		23,354	100.0
Republican hold			

== District 7 ==
=== Republican primary ===
==== Candidates ====
- Suzanne Miles, incumbent representative

=== General election ===
==== Results ====
2024 Kentucky House of Representatives 7th district election
Party	Candidate	Votes	%
Republican	Suzanne Miles (incumbent)	Unopposed	
Total votes		16,678	100.0
Republican hold			

== District 8 ==
=== Republican primary ===
==== Candidates ====
- Walker Wood Thomas, incumbent representative

=== General election ===
==== Results ====
2024 Kentucky House of Representatives 8th district election
Party	Candidate	Votes	%
Republican	Walker Wood Thomas (incumbent)	Unopposed	
Total votes		14,661	100.0
Republican hold			

== District 9 ==
=== Democratic primary ===
==== Candidates ====
===== Nominee =====
- Twyla Dillard, small business owner and candidate for the Hopkinsville city council in 2022

=== Republican primary ===
==== Candidates ====
===== Nominee =====
- Myron B. Dossett, incumbent representative

=== General election ===
==== Endorsements ====
Twyla Dillard (D)

Organizations

- Kentucky AFL-CIO
- United Auto Workers
Myron B. Dossett (R)

Organizations

- Kentucky Chamber of Commerce
- Kentucky Fraternal Order of Police
- Kentucky Right to Life Victory PAC
- NRA Political Victory Fund

==== Results ====
2024 Kentucky House of Representatives 9th district election
Party	Candidate	Votes	%
Republican	Myron B. Dossett (incumbent)	7,124	67.4
Democratic	Twyla Dillard	3,442	32.6
Total votes		10,566	100.0
Republican hold			

== District 10 ==
=== Democratic primary ===
==== Candidates ====
===== Nominee =====
- John Whipple, teacher, independent candidate for the 5th senate district in 2020, and write-in candidate for the 10th house district in 2022

=== Republican primary ===
==== Candidates ====
===== Nominee =====
- Josh Calloway, incumbent representative

===== Eliminated in primary =====
- Julie Cantwell, medical marijuana advocate

==== Endorsements ====
Josh Calloway

Organizations

- Kentucky Liberty Caucus
- Kentucky Right to Life Victory PAC
- NRA Political Victory Fund
Julie Cantwell

Organizations

- Kentucky AFL-CIO
- Kentucky Sierra Club

==== Fundraising ====
Final campaign finance reports
Candidate	Raised	Spent	Cash on hand
Josh Calloway	$19,606.00	$17,572.76	$2,033.24
Julie Cantwell	$14,625.88	$14,625.88	$0.00
Source: Kentucky Registry of Election Finance

==== Results ====
Republican primary results
Party	Candidate	Votes	%
Republican	Josh Calloway (incumbent)	2,773	79.0
Republican	Julie Cantwell	738	21.0
Total votes		3,511	100.0

=== General election ===
==== Endorsements ====
John Whipple (D)

Organizations

- Kentucky AFL-CIO
- Planned Parenthood Action Fund
- United Auto Workers
Josh Calloway (R)

Organizations

- Kentucky Fraternal Order of Police
- Kentucky Right to Life Victory PAC
- NRA Political Victory Fund

==== Results ====
2024 Kentucky House of Representatives 10th district election
Party	Candidate	Votes	%
Republican	Josh Calloway (incumbent)	15,702	69.0
Democratic	John Whipple	7,047	31.0
Total votes		22,749	100.0
Republican hold			

== District 11 ==
Incumbent Representative Jonathan Dixon was retiring.

=== Republican primary ===
==== Candidates ====
- J. T. Payne, farmer and member of the Henderson County Republican committee

=== General election ===
==== Results ====
2024 Kentucky House of Representatives 11th district election
Party	Candidate	Votes	%
Republican	J. T. Payne	Unopposed	
Total votes		14,964	100.0
Republican hold			

== District 12 ==
=== Democratic primary ===
==== Candidates ====
===== Nominee =====
- Alton M. Ayer

=== Republican primary ===
==== Candidates ====
===== Nominee =====
- Jim Gooch Jr., incumbent representative

=== General election ===
==== Endorsements ====
Alton M. Ayer (D)

Organizations

- Kentucky AFL-CIO
- United Auto Workers
Jim Gooch Jr. (R)

Organizations

- Kentucky Chamber of Commerce
- Kentucky Fraternal Order of Police
- NRA Political Victory Fund

==== Results ====
2024 Kentucky House of Representatives 12th district election
Party	Candidate	Votes	%
Republican	Jim Gooch Jr. (incumbent)	15,804	79.8
Democratic	Alton M. Ayer	3,989	20.2
Total votes		19,793	100.0
Republican hold			

== District 13 ==
=== Republican primary ===
==== Candidates ====
- D. J. Johnson, incumbent representative

=== General election ===
==== Results ====
2024 Kentucky House of Representatives 13th district election
Party	Candidate	Votes	%
Republican	D. J. Johnson (incumbent)	Unopposed	
Total votes		13,913	100.0
Republican hold			

== District 14 ==
=== Democratic primary ===
==== Candidates ====
===== Nominee =====
- Chanda Garner, store manager and treasurer of the Ohio County Democratic party

=== Republican primary ===
==== Candidates ====
===== Nominee =====
- Scott Lewis, incumbent representative

=== General election ===
==== Endorsements ====
Chanda Garner (D)

Organizations

- The Fairness Campaign
Scott Lewis (R)

Organizations

- Kentucky AFL-CIO
- Kentucky Fraternal Order of Police
- Kentucky Right to Life Victory PAC
- NRA Political Victory Fund
- United Auto Workers
- United Mine Workers of America

==== Results ====
2024 Kentucky House of Representatives 14th district election
Party	Candidate	Votes	%
Republican	Scott Lewis (incumbent)	17,093	80.6
Democratic	Chanda Garner	4,106	19.4
Total votes		21,199	100.0
Republican hold			

== District 15 ==
=== Republican primary ===
==== Candidates ====
===== Nominee =====
- Rebecca Raymer, incumbent representative

===== Withdrawn =====
- Kathy Perry-Russell (withdrew February 15, 2024, remained on ballot)

=== General election ===
==== Results ====
2024 Kentucky House of Representatives 15th district election
Party	Candidate	Votes	%
Republican	Rebecca Raymer (incumbent)	Unopposed	
Total votes		15,707	100.0
Republican hold			

== District 16 ==
=== Republican primary ===
==== Candidates ====
- Jason Petrie, incumbent representative

=== General election ===
==== Results ====
2024 Kentucky House of Representatives 16th district election
Party	Candidate	Votes	%
Republican	Jason Petrie (incumbent)	Unopposed	
Total votes		16,503	100.0
Republican hold			

== District 17 ==
=== Republican primary ===
==== Candidates ====
- Robert B. Duvall, incumbent representative

=== General election ===
==== Results ====
2024 Kentucky House of Representatives 17th district election
Party	Candidate	Votes	%
Republican	Robert B. Duvall (incumbent)	Unopposed	
Total votes		14,542	100.0
Republican hold			

== District 18 ==
=== Republican primary ===
==== Candidates ====
- Samara Heavrin, incumbent representative

=== General election ===
==== Results ====
2024 Kentucky House of Representatives 18th district election
Party	Candidate	Votes	%
Republican	Samara Heavrin (incumbent)	Unopposed	
Total votes		17,483	100.0
Republican hold			

== District 19 ==
=== Republican primary ===
==== Candidates ====
===== Nominee =====
- Michael Lee Meredith, incumbent representative

===== Eliminated in primary =====
- Kelcey Rock, farmer and candidate for Warren County magistrate in 2022

==== Endorsements ====
Michael Lee Meredith

Organizations

- Kentucky Chamber of Commerce
- Kentucky Educators' PAC
- NRA Political Victory Fund
Kelcey Rock

Organizations

- Kentucky Liberty Caucus
- Kentucky Right to Life Victory PAC

==== Fundraising ====
Campaign finance reports as of May 8, 2024
Candidate	Raised	Spent	Cash on hand
Michael Lee Meredith	$175,361.59	$175,361.59	$0.00
Kelcey Rock	$13,863.13	$12,756.25	$1,106.88
Source: Kentucky Registry of Election Finance

==== Results ====
Results by precinct: Meredith: 50–60%; 60–70%; 70–80%; 80–90%

Republican primary results
Party	Candidate	Votes	%
Republican	Michael Lee Meredith (incumbent)	3,334	75.9
Republican	Kelcey Rock	1,059	24.1
Total votes		4,393	100.0

=== General election ===
==== Results ====
2024 Kentucky House of Representatives 19th district election
Party	Candidate	Votes	%
Republican	Michael Lee Meredith (incumbent)	Unopposed	
Total votes		18,135	100.0
Republican hold			

== District 20 ==
=== Republican primary ===
==== Candidates ====
- Kevin L. Jackson, incumbent representative

=== General election ===
==== Results ====
2024 Kentucky House of Representatives 20th district election
Party	Candidate	Votes	%
Republican	Kevin L. Jackson (incumbent)	Unopposed	
Total votes		12,103	100.0
Republican hold			

== District 21 ==
=== Democratic primary ===
==== Candidates ====
===== Nominee =====
- Jeffery Humble, insurance agent

=== Republican primary ===
==== Candidates ====
===== Nominee =====
- Amy Neighbors, incumbent representative

=== General election ===
==== Endorsements ====
Jeffery Humble (D)

Organizations

- The Fairness Campaign
- Kentucky AFL-CIO
Amy Neighbors (R)

Organizations

- Kentucky Chamber of Commerce
- Kentucky Fraternal Order of Police
- NRA Political Victory Fund

==== Results ====
2024 Kentucky House of Representatives 21st district election
Party	Candidate	Votes	%
Republican	Amy Neighbors (incumbent)	18,175	82.5
Democratic	Jeffery Humble	3,868	17.5
Total votes		22,043	100.0
Republican hold			

== District 22 ==
=== Republican primary ===
==== Candidates ====
- Shawn McPherson, incumbent representative

=== General election ===
==== Results ====
2024 Kentucky House of Representatives 22nd district election
Party	Candidate	Votes	%
Republican	Shawn McPherson (incumbent)	Unopposed	
Total votes		17,979	100.0
Republican hold			

== District 23 ==
=== Republican primary ===
==== Candidates ====
- Steve Riley, incumbent representative

=== General election ===
==== Results ====
2024 Kentucky House of Representatives 23rd district election
Party	Candidate	Votes	%
Republican	Steve Riley (incumbent)	Unopposed	
Total votes		16,517	100.0
Republican hold			

== District 24 ==
Incumbent Representative Courtney Gilbert was retiring.

=== Democratic primary ===
==== Candidates ====
===== Nominee =====
- Johnny Pennington, candidate for the 21st district in 2020, and the 24th district in 2022 and March 2024

=== Republican primary ===
==== Candidates ====
===== Nominee =====
- Ryan Bivens, farmer

===== Eliminated in primary =====
- Asa L. T. Waggoner

===== Withdrawn =====
- Brandon Reed, representative from the 24th district (2017–2024) (withdrew January 5, 2024)

==== Endorsements ====
Ryan Bivens

Organizations

- Kentucky Chamber of Commerce
- Kentucky Right to Life Victory PAC
Asa L. T. Waggoner

Organizations

- Kentucky Liberty Caucus

==== Fundraising ====
Final campaign finance reports
Candidate	Raised	Spent	Cash on hand
Ryan Bivens	$90,232.22	$90,232.22	$0.00
Asa L. T. Waggoner	$11,776.99	$11,776.99	$0.00
Source: Kentucky Registry of Election Finance

==== Results ====
Republican primary results
Party	Candidate	Votes	%
Republican	Ryan Bivens	2,636	75.0
Republican	Asa L. T. Waggoner	878	25.0
Total votes		3,514	100.0

=== General election ===
==== Endorsements ====
Johnny Pennington (D)

Organizations

- The Fairness Campaign
- Kentucky AFL-CIO
- United Auto Workers
Ryan Bivens (R)

Organizations

- Kentucky Chamber of Commerce
- Kentucky Fraternal Order of Police
- Kentucky Right to Life Victory PAC
- NRA Political Victory Fund

==== Results ====
2024 Kentucky House of Representatives 24th district election
Party	Candidate	Votes	%
Republican	Ryan Bivens	17,097	81.6
Democratic	Johnny Pennington	3,860	18.4
Total votes		20,957	100.0
Republican hold			

== District 25 ==
=== Democratic primary ===
==== Candidates ====
===== Nominee =====
- Cherlyn Evette Smith, candidate for Elizabethtown city council in 2022

=== Republican primary ===
==== Candidates ====
===== Nominee =====
- Steve Bratcher, incumbent representative

=== Independent candidates ===
- Eric S. Parrish

=== General election ===
==== Endorsements ====
Cherlyn Evette Smith (D)

Organizations

- Emerge Kentucky
- The Fairness Campaign
- Kentucky Sierra Club
Steve Bratcher (R)

Organizations

- Kentucky Chamber of Commerce
- Kentucky Fraternal Order of Police
- NRA Political Victory Fund

==== Results ====
2024 Kentucky House of Representatives 25th district election
Party	Candidate	Votes	%
Republican	Steve Bratcher (incumbent)	11,792	62.8
Democratic	Cherlyn Evette Smith	6,245	33.3
Independent	Eric S. Parrish	744	4.0
Total votes		18,781	100.0
Republican hold			

== District 26 ==
=== Republican primary ===
==== Candidates ====
- Peyton Griffee, incumbent representative

=== General election ===
==== Results ====
2024 Kentucky House of Representatives 26th district election
Party	Candidate	Votes	%
Republican	Peyton Griffee (incumbent)	Unopposed	
Total votes		15,070	100.0
Republican hold			

== District 27 ==
=== Democratic primary ===
==== Candidates ====
===== Nominee =====
- Tyler Chapman, financial consultant

=== Republican primary ===
==== Candidates ====
===== Nominee =====
- Nancy J. Tate, incumbent representative

=== General election ===
==== Endorsements ====
Tyler Chapman (D)

Organizations

- The Fairness Campaign
- Kentucky AFL-CIO
- Kentucky Sierra Club
- Planned Parenthood Action Fund
- United Auto Workers
Nancy J. Tate (R)

Organizations

- Kentucky Chamber of Commerce
- Kentucky Fraternal Order of Police
- Kentucky Right to Life Victory PAC
- NRA Political Victory Fund

==== Results ====
2024 Kentucky House of Representatives 27th district election
Party	Candidate	Votes	%
Republican	Nancy J. Tate (incumbent)	11,980	62.9
Democratic	Tyler Chapman	7,065	37.1
Total votes		19,045	100.0
Republican hold			

== District 28 ==
=== Democratic primary ===
==== Candidates ====
===== Nominee =====
- Almaria Baker, teacher, candidate for this district in 2022, and the Louisville Metro Council in 2018

=== Republican primary ===
==== Candidates ====
===== Nominee =====
- Jared A. Bauman, incumbent representative

=== General election ===
==== Endorsements ====
Almaria Baker (D)

Organizations

- Emerge Kentucky
- The Fairness Campaign
- Kentuckians for the Commonwealth New Power PAC
- Kentucky AFL-CIO
- Kentucky Sierra Club
- Planned Parenthood Action Fund
- United Auto Workers
Jared A. Bauman (R)

Organizations

- Kentucky Chamber of Commerce
- Kentucky Fraternal Order of Police
- NRA Political Victory Fund

==== Results ====
2024 Kentucky House of Representatives 28th district election
Party	Candidate	Votes	%
Republican	Jared A. Bauman (incumbent)	11,536	58.6
Democratic	Almaria Baker	8,134	41.4
Total votes		19,670	100.0
Republican hold			

== District 29 ==
Incumbent Representative Kevin D. Bratcher was retiring to run for the Louisville Metro Council.

=== Democratic primary ===
==== Candidates ====
===== Nominee =====
- Timothy Findley Jr., pastor and candidate for mayor of Louisville in 2022

===== Eliminated in primary =====
- Matthew Pfaadt, engineer and Democratic nominee for this district in 2022 before withdrawing
- Ricky Santiago, president of the National Puerto Rican Chamber of Commerce

==== Endorsements ====
Matthew Pfaadt

Organizations

- 314 Action

==== Fundraising ====
Final campaign finance reports
Candidate	Raised	Spent	Cash on hand
Timothy Findley Jr.	$1,189.74	$1,189.74	$0.00
Matthew Pfaadt	$15,291.10	$9,037.57	$6,253.53
Ricky Santiago	$15,677.34	$14,099.47	$1,577.87
Source: Kentucky Registry of Election Finance

==== Results ====
Results by precinct: Findley Jr.: 40–50%; 50–60%; 90–100%; Pfaadt: 30–40%; 40–50%; 50–60%; 60–70%; Tie: 40–50%

Democratic primary results
Party	Candidate	Votes	%
Democratic	Timothy Findley Jr.	1,027	41.9
Democratic	Matthew Pfaadt	982	40.0
Democratic	Ricky Santiago	443	18.1
Total votes		2,452	100.0

=== Republican primary ===
==== Candidates ====
===== Nominee =====
- Chris Lewis, Republican strategist

===== Eliminated in primary =====
- Wyatt Allison, candidate for the Louisville Metro Council in 2020
- Debbie Peden, teacher and Republican nominee for the 2006 37th senate district special election

==== Endorsements ====
Chris Lewis

Organizations

- Kentucky Right to Life Victory PAC
Debbie Peden

Organizations

- Americans for Prosperity-Kentucky

==== Fundraising ====
Campaign finance reports as of June 24, 2024
Candidate	Raised	Spent	Cash on hand
Wyatt Allison	$2,026.00	$0.00	$2,026.00
Chris Lewis	$52,615.00	$52,166.02	$448.98
Debbie Peden	$9,639.68	$9,639.68	$0.00
Source: Kentucky Registry of Election Finance

==== Results ====
Results by precinct: Lewis: 50–60%; 60–70%; 70–80%; 80–90%; 90–100%; Peden: 50–60%; Tie: 50%

Republican primary results
Party	Candidate	Votes	%
Republican	Chris Lewis	2,063	68.0
Republican	Debbie Peden	822	27.1
Republican	Wyatt Allison	151	5.0
Total votes		3,036	100.0

=== General election ===
==== Endorsements ====
Timothy Findley Jr. (D)

Organizations

- The Fairness Campaign
- Kentuckians for the Commonwealth New Power PAC
- Kentucky AFL-CIO
- Kentucky Sierra Club
Chris Lewis (R)

Organizations

- Kentucky Chamber of Commerce
- Kentucky Fraternal Order of Police
- Kentucky Right to Life Victory PAC
Declined to endorse

Organizations

- NRA Political Victory Fund

==== Results ====
2024 Kentucky House of Representatives 29th district election
Party	Candidate	Votes	%
Republican	Chris Lewis	14,051	57.5
Democratic	Timothy Findley Jr.	10,371	42.5
Total votes		24,422	100.0
Republican hold			

== District 30 ==
=== Democratic primary ===
==== Candidates ====
===== Nominee =====
- Daniel Grossberg, incumbent representative

===== Eliminated in primary =====
- Mitra Subedi, teacher

==== Endorsements ====
Daniel Grossberg

Statewide officials

- Andy Beshear, governor of Kentucky (2019–present)

Organizations

- The Fairness Campaign
- Kentucky AFL-CIO
- Kentucky Educators' PAC

==== Fundraising ====
Final campaign finance reports
Candidate	Raised	Spent	Cash on hand
Daniel Grossberg	$96,537.00	$39,894.88	$56,642.12
Mitra Subedi	$55,479.34	$55,479.34	$0.00
Source: Kentucky Registry of Election Finance

==== Results ====
Results by precinct: Grossberg: 50–60%; 60–70%; Subedi: 50–60%; 60–70%

Democratic primary results
Party	Candidate	Votes	%
Democratic	Daniel Grossberg (incumbent)	1,629	50.8
Democratic	Mitra Subedi	1,579	49.2
Total votes		3,208	100.0

=== General election ===
==== Results ====
2024 Kentucky House of Representatives 30th district election
Party	Candidate	Votes	%
Democratic	Daniel Grossberg (incumbent)	Unopposed	
Total votes		10,125	100.0
Democratic hold			

== District 31 ==
=== Democratic primary ===
==== Candidates ====
===== Nominee =====
- Colleen Orsella Davis, attorney

===== Eliminated in primary =====
- Carma Bell Marshall, transgender rights activist

==== Endorsements ====
Colleen Orsella Davis

Organizations

- Kentucky AFL-CIO
Carma Bell Marshall

Organizations

- The Fairness Campaign

==== Fundraising ====
Campaign finance reports as of May 8, 2024
Candidate	Raised	Spent	Cash on hand
Colleen Orsella Davis	$75,931.25	$75,931.25	$0.00
Carma Bell Marshall	$1,165.00	$15.99	$1,149.01
Source: Kentucky Registry of Election Finance

==== Results ====
Results by precinct: Davis: 50–60%; 60–70%; 70–80%; 90–100%; Marshall: 60–70%

Democratic primary results
Party	Candidate	Votes	%
Democratic	Colleen Orsella Davis	1,889	65.9
Democratic	Carma Bell Marshall	976	34.1
Total votes		2,865	100.0

=== Republican primary ===
==== Candidates ====
===== Nominee =====
- Susan Tyler Witten, incumbent representative

=== Independent candidates ===
==== Withdrawn ====
- G. Perry Adelmann, candidate for the Kentucky Senate in 2018 and the Jefferson County Board of Education in 2022 (withdrew September 3, 2024)

=== General election ===
==== Endorsements ====
Colleen Orsella Davis (D)

Statewide officials

- Andy Beshear, governor of Kentucky (2019–present)

Organizations

- The Fairness Campaign
- Kentucky AFL-CIO
- Kentucky Sierra Club
- Planned Parenthood Action Fund
- United Auto Workers
Susan Tyler Witten (R)

Organizations

- Americans for Prosperity-Kentucky
- Kentucky Chamber of Commerce
- Kentucky Fraternal Order of Police
- NRA Political Victory Fund

==== Results ====
2024 Kentucky House of Representatives 31st district election
Party	Candidate	Votes	%
Republican	Susan Tyler Witten (incumbent)	12,067	50.7
Democratic	Colleen Orsella Davis	11,727	49.3
Total votes		23,794	100.0
Republican hold			

== District 32 ==
=== Democratic primary ===
==== Candidates ====
- Tina Bojanowski, incumbent representative

=== General election ===
==== Results ====
2024 Kentucky House of Representatives 32nd district election
Party	Candidate	Votes	%
Democratic	Tina Bojanowski (incumbent)	Unopposed	
Total votes		16,494	100.0
Democratic hold			

== District 33 ==
=== Democratic primary ===
==== Candidates ====
===== Nominee =====
- Taylor Jolly, pension actuary

=== Republican primary ===
==== Candidates ====
===== Nominee =====
- Jason Michael Nemes, incumbent representative and house majority whip

=== General election ===
==== Endorsements ====
Taylor Jolly (D)

Statewide officials

- Andy Beshear, governor of Kentucky (2019–present)

Organizations

- Kentuckians for the Commonwealth New Power PAC
- Kentucky AFL-CIO
- Kentucky Sierra Club
- Run for Something
- United Auto Workers
- United Mine Workers of America
Jason Michael Nemes (R)

Organizations

- Kentucky Chamber of Commerce
- Kentucky Fraternal Order of Police
- Kentucky Right to Life Victory PAC
- NRA Political Victory Fund

==== Results ====
2024 Kentucky House of Representatives 33rd district election
Party	Candidate	Votes	%
Republican	Jason Michael Nemes (incumbent)	14,349	56.9
Democratic	Taylor Jolly	10,882	43.1
Total votes		25,231	100.0
Republican hold			

== District 34 ==
=== Democratic primary ===
==== Candidates ====
- Sarah Stalker, incumbent representative

=== General election ===
==== Results ====
2024 Kentucky House of Representatives 34th district election
Party	Candidate	Votes	%
Democratic	Sarah Stalker (incumbent)	Unopposed	
Total votes		19,214	100.0
Democratic hold			

== District 35 ==
=== Democratic primary ===
==== Candidates ====
- Lisa Willner, incumbent representative

=== General election ===
==== Results ====
2024 Kentucky House of Representatives 35th district election
Party	Candidate	Votes	%
Democratic	Lisa Willner (incumbent)	Unopposed	
Total votes		8,662	100.0
Democratic hold			

== District 36 ==
=== Democratic primary ===
==== Candidates ====
===== Nominee =====
- William "Woody" Zorn, teacher

===== Eliminated in primary =====
- Colin Daugherty McDowell

==== Endorsements ====
William "Woody" Zorn

Organizations

- Kentucky AFL-CIO
- Kentucky Educators' PAC

==== Fundraising ====
Campaign finance reports as of May 8, 2024
Candidate	Raised	Spent	Cash on hand
Colin Daugherty McDowell	$50.00	$29.97	$20.03
William "Woody" Zorn	$9,433.63	$9,433.63	$0.00
Source: Kentucky Registry of Election Finance

==== Results ====
Results by precinct: Zorn: 50–60%; 60–70%; 70–80%; McDowell: 50–60%; 60–70%; 70–80%; 90–100%; Tie: 50%

Democratic primary results
Party	Candidate	Votes	%
Democratic	William "Woody" Zorn	1,019	50.1
Democratic	Colin Daugherty McDowell	1,014	49.9
Total votes		2,033	100.0

=== Republican primary ===
==== Candidates ====
===== Nominee =====
- John F. Hodgson, incumbent representative

=== General election ===
==== Endorsements ====
William "Woody" Zorn (D)

Organizations

- The Fairness Campaign
- Kentucky AFL-CIO
- Kentucky Sierra Club
- United Auto Workers
John F. Hodgson (R)

Organizations

- Kentucky Chamber of Commerce
- Kentucky Fraternal Order of Police
- Kentucky Right to Life Victory PAC
- NRA Political Victory Fund

==== Results ====
2024 Kentucky House of Representatives 36th district election
Party	Candidate	Votes	%
Republican	John F. Hodgson (incumbent)	15,601	57.9
Democratic	William "Woody" Zorn	11,364	42.1
Total votes		26,965	100.0
Republican hold			

== District 37 ==
=== Democratic primary ===
==== Candidates ====
===== Nominee =====
- John J. Stovall, president of the Jefferson County Public Schools bus drivers’ union (Teamsters Local 783)

=== Republican primary ===
==== Candidates ====
===== Nominee =====
- Emily Callaway, incumbent representative

=== General election ===
==== Endorsements ====
John J. Stovall (D)

Statewide officials

- Andy Beshear, governor of Kentucky (2019–present)

Organizations

- Kentuckians for the Commonwealth New Power PAC
- Kentucky AFL-CIO
- United Auto Workers
- United Mine Workers of America
Emily Callaway (R)

Organizations

- Kentucky Fraternal Order of Police
- NRA Political Victory Fund

==== Results ====
2024 Kentucky House of Representatives 37th district election
Party	Candidate	Votes	%
Republican	Emily Callaway (incumbent)	10,330	56.4
Democratic	John J. Stovall	7,970	43.6
Total votes		18,300	100.0
Republican hold			

== District 38 ==
=== Democratic primary ===
==== Candidates ====
===== Nominee =====
- Rachel Roarx, incumbent representative

=== Republican primary ===
==== Candidates ====
===== Nominee =====
- Carrie Sanders McKeehan, teacher and Republican nominee for the 41st district in 2022

=== General election ===
==== Endorsements ====
Rachel Roarx (D)

Statewide officials

- Andy Beshear, governor of Kentucky (2019–present)

Organizations

- The Fairness Campaign
- Kentuckians for the Commonwealth New Power PAC
- Kentucky AFL-CIO
- Kentucky Fraternal Order of Police
- Kentucky Sierra Club
- Planned Parenthood Action Fund
- United Auto Workers
Carrie Sanders McKeehan (R)

Organizations

- Kentucky Right to Life Victory PAC
Declined to endorse

Organizations

- NRA Political Victory Fund

==== Results ====
2024 Kentucky House of Representatives 38th district election
Party	Candidate	Votes	%
Democratic	Rachel Roarx (incumbent)	8,743	50.7
Republican	Carrie Sanders McKeehan	8,494	49.3
Total votes		17,237	100.0
Democratic hold			

== District 39 ==
=== Democratic primary ===
==== Candidates ====
===== Nominee =====
- Ryan Stanford, exterminator

=== Republican primary ===
==== Candidates ====
===== Nominee =====
- Matt Lockett, incumbent representative

=== General election ===
==== Endorsements ====
Ryan Stanford (D)

Organizations

- The Fairness Campaign
- Kentucky Sierra Club
Matt Lockett (R)

Organizations

- Kentucky Chamber of Commerce
- Kentucky Fraternal Order of Police
- Kentucky Right to Life Victory PAC
- NRA Political Victory Fund

==== Results ====
2024 Kentucky House of Representatives 39th district election
Party	Candidate	Votes	%
Republican	Matt Lockett (incumbent)	12,660	59.6
Democratic	Ryan Stanford	8,593	40.4
Total votes		21,253	100.0
Republican hold			

== District 40 ==
Incumbent Representative Nima Kulkarni was unopposed for reelection following her victory in the primary election. However, her nomination in the primary election was disqualified by the Kentucky Supreme Court due to errors on the signatures of her candidacy papers. Following the ruling, Secretary of State Michael Adams certified that a vacancy existed in the nomination for the district, and that the Democratic and Republican parties would be able to nominate candidates for the general election. The Democratic party again selected Kulkarni, while Republicans did not field a candidate.

=== Democratic nomination ===
==== Nominee ====
- Nima Kulkarni, incumbent representative

==== Primary election ====
===== Candidates =====
- Nima Kulkarni
- William Zeitz

===== Endorsements =====
Nima Kulkarni

Organizations

- Emerge Kentucky
- The Fairness Campaign
- Kentucky AFL-CIO
- Kentuckians for the Commonwealth New Power PAC
- Kentucky Educators' PAC

===== Results =====
Results by precinct: Kulkarni: 50–60%; 60–70%; 70–80%; 80–90%; 90–100%; Tie: 50%

Democratic primary results (unofficial)
Party	Candidate	Votes	%
Democratic	Nima Kulkarni (incumbent)	2,006	78.0
Democratic	William Zeitz	565	22.0
Total votes		2,571	100.0

=== Republican nomination ===
==== Nominee ====
- None selected

=== General election ===
==== Results ====
2024 Kentucky House of Representatives 40th district election
Party	Candidate	Votes	%
Democratic	Nima Kulkarni (incumbent)	Unopposed	
Total votes		10,293	100.0
Democratic hold			

== District 41 ==
Incumbent Representative Josie Raymond was retiring to run for the Louisville Metro Council.

=== Democratic primary ===
==== Candidates ====
===== Nominee =====
- Mary Lou Marzian, representative from the 34th district (1994–2023)

===== Eliminated in primary =====
- William "Rick" Adams, attorney

==== Endorsements ====
Mary Lou Marzian

State legislators

- Joni Jenkins, state representative from the 44th district (1995–2023)

Organizations

- The Fairness Campaign
- Kentucky AFL-CIO
- Kentucky Educators' PAC

==== Fundraising ====
Final campaign finance reports
Candidate	Raised	Spent	Cash on hand
William "Rick" Adams	$80,907.18	$74,562.55	$6,344.63
Mary Lou Marzian	$90,415.14	$56,526.68	$33,888.46
Source: Kentucky Registry of Election Finance

==== Results ====
Results by precinct: Marzian: 50–60%; 60–70%; 70–80%; 80–90%; Adams: 50–60%; 60–70%

Democratic primary results
Party	Candidate	Votes	%
Democratic	Mary Lou Marzian	4,946	70.9
Democratic	William "Rick" Adams	2,034	29.1
Total votes		6,980	100.0

=== Republican primary ===
==== Candidates ====
===== Nominee =====
- Sara-Elizabeth Cottrell, candidate for the Republican nomination for this district in 2022

=== General election ===
==== Endorsements ====
Mary Lou Marzian (D)

Organizations

- The Fairness Campaign
- Kentuckians for the Commonwealth New Power PAC
- Kentucky AFL-CIO
- Kentucky Sierra Club
- Planned Parenthood Action Fund
- United Auto Workers
Sara-Elizabeth Cottrell (R)

Organizations

- Kentucky Fraternal Order of Police
Declined to endorse

Organizations

- NRA Political Victory Fund

==== Results ====
2024 Kentucky House of Representatives 41st district election
Party	Candidate	Votes	%
Democratic	Mary Lou Marzian	18,485	74.0
Republican	Sara-Elizabeth Cottrell	6,511	26.0
Total votes		24,996	100.0
Democratic hold			

== District 42 ==
Incumbent Representative Keturah Herron was retiring to run for the 35th senate district.

=== Democratic primary ===
==== Candidates ====
===== Nominee =====
- Joshua Watkins, realtor

===== Eliminated in primary =====
- Jonathan Musselwhite, union steward and candidate for the Louisville Metro Council in 2014
- Jack W. Walker, candidate for the 35th district in 2018

==== Endorsements ====
Joshua Watkins

Organizations

- The Fairness Campaign

==== Fundraising ====
Final campaign finance reports
Candidate	Raised	Spent	Cash on hand
Jonathan Musselwhite	$11,220.00	$10,846.07	$373.93
Jack W. Walker	$20,805.00	$20,805.00	$0.00
Joshua Watkins	$44,825.65	$44,825.65	$0.00
Source: Kentucky Registry of Election Finance

==== Results ====
Results by precinct: Watkins: 30–40%; 40–50%; 50–60%; 60–70%; 70–80%; Musselwhite: 30–40%; 50–60%; Walker: 30–40%; Tie: 30–40%; 40–50%; 50%

Democratic primary results
Party	Candidate	Votes	%
Democratic	Joshua Watkins	2,103	53.0
Democratic	Jonathan Musselwhite	951	24.0
Democratic	Jack W. Walker	914	23.0
Total votes		3,968	100.0

=== General election ===
==== Results ====
2024 Kentucky House of Representatives 42nd district election
Party	Candidate	Votes	%
Democratic	Joshua Watkins	Unopposed	
Total votes		12,350	100.0
Democratic hold			

== District 43 ==
=== Democratic primary ===
==== Candidates ====
- Pamela Stevenson, incumbent representative and Democratic nominee for attorney general in 2023

=== General election ===
==== Results ====
2024 Kentucky House of Representatives 43rd district election
Party	Candidate	Votes	%
Democratic	Pamela Stevenson (incumbent)	Unopposed	
Total votes		12,088	100.0
Democratic hold			

== District 44 ==
=== Democratic primary ===
==== Candidates ====
- Beverly D. Chester-Burton, incumbent representative

===== Eliminated in primary =====
- Daniel Deshawn Cockrell
- Shreeta Waldon

==== Endorsements ====
Beverly D. Chester-Burton

Organizations

- Emerge Kentucky (co-endorsement with Waldon)
- Kentucky AFL-CIO
- Kentucky Educators' PAC
Shreeta Waldon

Organizations

- Emerge Kentucky (co-endorsement with Chester-Burton)

==== Fundraising ====
Campaign finance reports as of July 23, 2024
Candidate	Raised	Spent	Cash on hand
Beverly D. Chester-Burton	$0.00	$0.00	$0.00
Daniel Deshawn Cockrell	$0.00	$0.00	$0.00
Shreeta Waldon	$1,173.00	$415.44	$757.56
Source: Kentucky Registry of Election Finance

==== Results ====
Results by precinct: Chester-Burton: 30–40%; 40–50%; 50–60%; 60–70%; 70–80%; Waldon: 40–50%; Cockrell: 30–40%; 40–50%; Tie: 30–40%

Democratic primary results
Party	Candidate	Votes	%
Democratic	Beverly D. Chester-Burton (incumbent)	1,646	50.7
Democratic	Shreeta Waldon	918	28.3
Democratic	Daniel Deshawn Cockrell	684	21.1
Total votes		3,248	100.0

=== General election ===
==== Results ====
2024 Kentucky House of Representatives 44th district election
Party	Candidate	Votes	%
Democratic	Beverly D. Chester-Burton (incumbent)	Unopposed	
Total votes		12,888	100.0
Democratic hold			

== District 45 ==
Incumbent representative Killian Timoney was defeated for renomination by Thomas Jefferson, who lost the general election to Democratic candidate Adam Moore.

=== Democratic primary ===
==== Candidates ====
===== Nominee =====
- Adam Moore, veteran and personal fitness coach

=== Republican primary ===
==== Candidates ====
===== Nominee =====
- Thomas Jefferson, retired salesman

===== Eliminated in primary =====
- Killian Timoney, incumbent representative

==== Endorsements ====
Thomas Jefferson

State legislators

- Stan Cave, state representative from the 45th district (1993–2001)

Individuals

- Andrew Cooperrider, conservative radio host and candidate for the 22nd senate district in 2022

Organizations

- Jessamine County Republican party
- Kentucky Liberty Caucus
Killian Timoney

Newspapers

- The Lexington Herald-Leader

Organizations

- Kentucky Chamber of Commerce
- Kentucky Educators' PAC
Declined to endorse

Organizations

- Kentucky Right to Life Victory PAC (Note: The PAC "recommended" Jefferson but declined to fully endorse his candidacy.)
- Kentucky Sierra Club (Note: The Sierra Club endorsed "against" Jefferson, but did not endorse Timoney's candidacy.)
- NRA Political Victory Fund

==== Results ====
Results by precinct: Jefferson: 50–60%; 60–70%; 70–80%; 80–90%

Republican primary results
Party	Candidate	Votes	%
Republican	Thomas Jefferson	2,773	72.1
Republican	Killian Timoney (incumbent)	1,072	27.9
Total votes		3,845	100.0

=== General election ===
==== Endorsements ====
Adam Moore (D)

Statewide officials

- Andy Beshear, governor of Kentucky (2019–present)

Newspapers

- The Lexington Herald-Leader

Organizations

- The Fairness Campaign
- Kentucky AFL-CIO
- Kentucky Sierra Club
- Planned Parenthood Action Fund
- Run for Something
- United Auto Workers

==== Results ====
2024 Kentucky House of Representatives 45th district election
Party	Candidate	Votes	%
Democratic	Adam Moore	13,030	50.3
Republican	Thomas Jefferson	12,858	49.7
Total votes		25,888	100.0
Democratic gain from Republican			

== District 46 ==
=== Democratic primary ===
==== Candidates ====
===== Nominee =====
- Alan "Al" Gentry, incumbent representative

=== Republican primary ===
==== Candidates ====
===== Nominee =====
- Bob DeVore, former McCreary County Board of Education member (2001–2007) and perennial candidate (Note: Candidate for Kentucky's 16th Senate district in 2006; candidate for Kentucky's 3rd congressional district in 2008, 2012, 2016, and 2022; candidate for Kentucky's 46th House district in 2010 and nominee in 2020; Republican nominee for Mayor of Louisville in 2014 and candidate in 2018; candidate for Governor of Kentucky in 2023)

=== General election ===
==== Endorsements ====
Alan “Al” Gentry (D)

Organizations

- 314 Action
- The Fairness Campaign
- Kentuckians for the Commonwealth New Power PAC
- Kentucky AFL-CIO
- Kentucky Fraternal Order of Police
- Kentucky Sierra Club
- United Auto Workers

==== Results ====
2024 Kentucky House of Representatives 46th district election
Party	Candidate	Votes	%
Democratic	Alan “Al” Gentry (incumbent)	11,755	56.6
Republican	Bob DeVore	9,019	43.4
Total votes		20,774	100.0
Democratic hold			

== District 47 ==
=== Democratic primary ===
==== Candidates ====
===== Nominee =====
- Robb Adams, firefighter, mayor of Carrollton (2015–present), and member of the Carrollton city council (2011–2015)

=== Republican primary ===
==== Candidates ====
===== Nominee =====
- Felicia Rabourn, incumbent representative

===== Eliminated in primary =====
- Mark A. Gilkison, Republican nominee for this district in 2018

==== Endorsements ====
Mark A. Gilkison

Organizations

- Kentucky Chamber of Commerce
Felicia Rabourn

Organizations

- Kentucky Liberty Caucus
- Kentucky Right to Life Victory PAC
- NRA Political Victory Fund

==== Fundraising ====
Final campaign finance reports
Candidate	Raised	Spent	Cash on hand
Mark A. Gilkison	$40,649.21	$35,814.77	$4,834.44
Felicia Rabourn	$34,209.81	$34,209.81	$0.00
Source: Kentucky Registry of Election Finance

==== Results ====
Republican primary results
Party	Candidate	Votes	%
Republican	Felicia Rabourn (incumbent)	2,029	57.2
Republican	Mark A. Gilkison	1,518	42.8
Total votes		3,547	100.0

=== General election ===
==== Endorsements ====
Robb Adams (D)

Organizations

- Kentucky AFL-CIO
- Kentucky Fraternal Order of Police
- United Auto Workers
Felicia Rabourn (R)

Organizations

- Kentucky Right to Life Victory PAC
- NRA Political Victory Fund

==== Results ====
2024 Kentucky House of Representatives 47th district election
Party	Candidate	Votes	%
Republican	Felicia Rabourn (incumbent)	14,703	68.2
Democratic	Robb Adams	6,844	31.8
Total votes		21,547	100.0
Republican hold			

== District 48 ==
=== Democratic primary ===
==== Candidates ====
===== Nominee =====
- Kate Farrow, Louisville Water Company operations manager and candidate for the Oldham County Board of Education in 2022

===== Eliminated in primary =====
- Debbie Wesslund, member of the Jefferson County Board of Education (2007–2015)

==== Endorsements ====
Kate Farrow

Organizations

- The Fairness Campaign
- Kentucky AFL-CIO

==== Fundraising ====
Final campaign finance reports
Candidate	Raised	Spent	Cash on hand
Kate Farrow	$53,715.74	$53,715.74	$0.00
Debbie Wesslund	$19,507.83	$19,507.83	$0.00
Source: Kentucky Registry of Election Finance

==== Results ====
Results by precinct: Farrow: 50–60%; 60–70%; 70–80%; Wesslund: 50–60%; 60–70%; 80–90%; Tie: 50%

Democratic primary results
Party	Candidate	Votes	%
Democratic	Kate Farrow	1,912	59.1
Democratic	Debbie Wesslund	1,323	40.9
Total votes		3,235	100.0

=== Republican primary ===
==== Candidates ====
===== Nominee =====
- Ken Fleming, incumbent representative

=== General election ===
==== Endorsements ====
Kate Farrow (D)

Statewide officials

- Andy Beshear, governor of Kentucky (2019–present)

Organizations

- The Fairness Campaign
- Kentucky AFL-CIO
- Kentucky Sierra Club
- LGBTQ Victory Fund
- Planned Parenthood Action Fund
- United Auto Workers
Ken Fleming (R)

Organizations

- Americans for Prosperity-Kentucky
- Kentucky Chamber of Commerce
- Kentucky Fraternal Order of Police
- NRA Political Victory Fund

==== Results ====
2024 Kentucky House of Representatives 48th district election
Party	Candidate	Votes	%
Republican	Ken Fleming (incumbent)	15,195	53.7
Democratic	Kate Farrow	13,081	46.3
Total votes		28,276	100.0
Republican hold			

== District 49 ==
=== Republican primary ===
==== Candidates ====
===== Nominee =====
- Thomas Huff, incumbent representative

===== Eliminated in primary =====
- William Harned, chairman of the Bullitt County Soil Conservation District

==== Endorsements ====
Thomas Huff

Organizations

- Kentucky Chamber of Commerce
- Kentucky Liberty Caucus
- Kentucky Right to Life Victory PAC
- NRA Political Victory Fund

==== Fundraising ====
Final campaign finance reports
Candidate	Raised	Spent	Cash on hand
William Harned	$8,200.00	$7,890.68	$309.32
Thomas Huff	$64,990.65	$64,990.65	$0.00
Source: Kentucky Registry of Election Finance

==== Results ====
Results by precinct: Huff: 60–70%; 70–80%; 80–90%

Republican primary results
Party	Candidate	Votes	%
Republican	Thomas Huff (incumbent)	1,955	75.1
Republican	William Harned	647	24.9
Total votes		2,602	100.0

=== General election ===
==== Results ====
2024 Kentucky House of Representatives 49th district election
Party	Candidate	Votes	%
Republican	Thomas Huff (incumbent)	Unopposed	
Total votes		19,471	100.0
Republican hold			

== District 50 ==
=== Republican primary ===
==== Candidates ====
===== Nominee =====
- Candy Massaroni, incumbent representative

===== Eliminated in primary =====
- Andy Stone, pilot and member of the Bardstown Board of Education (2013–2025)

===== Withdrawn =====
- Don Thrasher, candidate for judge/executive of Nelson County in 2018 and 2022, and candidate for this district in 2020 (withdrew April 19, 2024, remained on ballot)

==== Endorsements ====
Candy Massaroni

Organizations

- Kentucky Liberty Caucus
- Kentucky Right to Life Victory PAC
- Make Liberty Win PAC
- NRA Political Victory Fund
Andy Stone

Organizations

- Kentucky Chamber of Commerce

==== Fundraising ====
Final campaign finance reports
Candidate	Raised	Spent	Cash on hand
Candy Massaroni	$35,165.80	$35,165.80	$0.00
Andy Stone	$57,746.97	$57,746.97	$0.00
Source: Kentucky Registry of Election Finance

==== Results ====
Results by precinct: Massaroni: 50–60%; 60–70%; 70–80%; Stone: 50–60%

Republican primary results
Party	Candidate	Votes	%
Republican	Candy Massaroni (incumbent)	2,183	64.4
Republican	Andy Stone	1,208	35.6
Total votes		3,391	100.0

=== General election ===
==== Results ====
2024 Kentucky House of Representatives 50th district election
Party	Candidate	Votes	%
Republican	Candy Massaroni (incumbent)	Unopposed	
Total votes		16,783	100.0
Republican hold			

== District 51 ==
=== Republican primary ===
==== Candidates ====
- Michael “Sarge” Pollock, incumbent representative

=== General election ===
==== Results ====
2024 Kentucky House of Representatives 51st district election
Party	Candidate	Votes	%
Republican	Michael “Sarge” Pollock (incumbent)	Unopposed	
Total votes		17,064	100.0
Republican hold			

== District 52 ==
=== Republican primary ===
==== Candidates ====
- Ken Upchurch, incumbent representative

=== General election ===
==== Results ====
2024 Kentucky House of Representatives 52nd district election
Party	Candidate	Votes	%
Republican	Ken Upchurch (incumbent)	Unopposed	
Total votes		16,723	100.0
Republican hold			

== District 53 ==
=== Republican primary ===
==== Candidates ====
- James Allen Tipton, incumbent representative

=== General election ===
==== Results ====
2024 Kentucky House of Representatives 53rd district election
Party	Candidate	Votes	%
Republican	James Allen Tipton (incumbent)	Unopposed	
Total votes		20,101	100.0
Republican hold			

== District 54 ==
=== Republican primary ===
==== Candidates ====
- Daniel B. Elliott, incumbent representative

=== General election ===
==== Results ====
2024 Kentucky House of Representatives 54th district election
Party	Candidate	Votes	%
Republican	Daniel B. Elliott (incumbent)	Unopposed	
Total votes		16,970	100.0
Republican hold			

== District 55 ==
=== Democratic primary ===
==== Candidates ====
===== Nominee =====
- Katrina A. Sexton, member of the Burgin Board of Education (2019–present) and the Burgin city council (2009–2011, 2017–2019)

=== Republican primary ===
==== Candidates ====
===== Nominee =====
- Kim King, incumbent representative

===== Withdrawn =====
- James Toller, Libertarian nominee for the 78th district in 2020 (withdrew May 2, 2024, remained on ballot)

=== General election ===
==== Endorsements ====
Katrina A. Sexton (D)

Organizations

- Kentucky Sierra Club
Kim King (R)

Organizations

- Kentucky Chamber of Commerce
- Kentucky Fraternal Order of Police
- Kentucky Right to Life Victory PAC
- NRA Political Victory Fund

==== Results ====
2024 Kentucky House of Representatives 55th district election
Party	Candidate	Votes	%
Republican	Kim King (incumbent)	16,382	73.4
Democratic	Katrina A. Sexton	5,922	26.6
Total votes		22,304	100.0
Republican hold			

== District 56 ==
=== Democratic primary ===
==== Candidates ====
===== Nominee =====
- Chantel Bingham, member of the Versailles city council (2023–2025)

===== Eliminated in primary =====
- Dencia Miche Branscum

==== Endorsements ====
Dencia Miche Branscum

Organizations

- Emerge Kentucky

==== Fundraising ====
Final campaign finance reports
Candidate	Raised	Spent	Cash on hand
Chantel Bingham	$12,770.27	$12,770.27	$0.00
Dencia Miche Branscum	$6,177.00	$6,147.13	$29.87
Source: Kentucky Registry of Election Finance

==== Results ====
Results by precinct: Bingham: 50–60%; 60–70%; 70–80%; Branscum: 50–60%

Democratic primary results
Party	Candidate	Votes	%
Democratic	Chantel Bingham	2,609	66.1
Democratic	Dencia Miche Branscum	1,336	33.9
Total votes		3,945	100.0

=== Republican primary ===
==== Candidates ====
===== Nominee =====
- Daniel A. Fister, incumbent representative

=== General election ===
==== Endorsements ====
Chantel Bingham (D)

Organizations

- Kentucky AFL-CIO
- Kentucky Sierra Club
Daniel A. Fister (R)

Organizations

- Kentucky Chamber of Commerce
- Kentucky Fraternal Order of Police
- Kentucky Right to Life Victory PAC
- NRA Political Victory Fund

==== Results ====
2024 Kentucky House of Representatives 56th district election
Party	Candidate	Votes	%
Republican	Daniel A. Fister (incumbent)	13,863	57.4
Democratic	Chantel Bingham	10,269	42.6
Total votes		24,132	100.0
Republican hold			

== District 57 ==
Incumbent Representative and House Minority Leader Derrick W. Graham was retiring.

=== Democratic primary ===
==== Candidates ====
===== Nominee =====
- Erika Marie Hancock

===== Eliminated in primary =====
- Kristie Powe, Legislative Research Commission employee

==== Endorsements ====
Kristie Powe

Organizations

- The Fairness Campaign

==== Fundraising ====
Final campaign finance reports
Candidate	Raised	Spent	Cash on hand
Erika Marie Hancock	$64,097.00	$64,097.00	$0.00
Kristie Powe	$14,385.00	$14,113.74	$271.26
Source: Kentucky Registry of Election Finance

==== Results ====
Results by precinct: Hancock: 50–60%; 60–70%; 70–80%; Powe: 60–70%

Democratic primary results
Party	Candidate	Votes	%
Democratic	Erika Marie Hancock	4,467	67.3
Democratic	Kristie Powe	2,168	32.7
Total votes		6,635	100.0

=== Republican primary ===
==== Candidates ====
===== Nominee =====
- Kyle T. Thompson, Frankfort city commissioner (2021–2022, 2023–2025) (Note: The city commission removed Thompson from office in March 2022 due to allegations of misconduct. Thompson was reelected in 2022, and his removal was later declared to have been unlawful.) and candidate for mayor of Frankfort in 2012

=== General election ===
==== Endorsements ====
Erika Marie Hancock (D)

Statewide officials

- Andy Beshear, governor of Kentucky (2019–present)

Organizations

- The Fairness Campaign
- Kentucky AFL-CIO
- Kentucky Sierra Club
- Planned Parenthood Action Fund
Kyle T. Thompson (R)

Organizations

- Kentucky Right to Life Victory PAC
Declined to endorse

Organizations

- NRA Political Victory Fund

==== Results ====
2024 Kentucky House of Representatives 57th district election
Party	Candidate	Votes	%
Democratic	Erika Marie Hancock	11,342	55.4
Republican	Kyle T. Thompson	9,127	44.6
Total votes		20,469	100.0
Democratic hold			

== District 58 ==
=== Democratic primary ===
==== Candidates ====
===== Disqualified =====
- Richard A. Henderson

=== Republican primary ===
==== Candidates ====
===== Nominee =====
- Jennifer Henson Decker, incumbent representative

=== General election ===
==== Results ====
2024 Kentucky House of Representatives 58th district election
Party	Candidate	Votes	%
Republican	Jennifer Henson Decker (incumbent)	Unopposed	
Total votes		17,330	100.0
Republican hold			

== District 59 ==
=== Republican primary ===
==== Candidates ====
- David W. Osborne, incumbent representative and speaker of the house

=== General election ===
==== Results ====
2024 Kentucky House of Representatives 59th district election
Party	Candidate	Votes	%
Republican	David W. Osborne (incumbent)	Unopposed	
Total votes		18,552	100.0
Republican hold			

== District 60 ==
=== Democratic primary ===
==== Candidates ====
===== Nominee =====
- Deborah Ison Flowers, retired nurse

=== Republican primary ===
==== Candidates ====
===== Nominee =====
- Marianne Proctor, incumbent representative

===== Eliminated in primary =====
- Christopher Pavese, engineer

===== Withdrawn =====
- Darren Nichols (withdrew January 17, 2024)

==== Endorsements ====
Christopher Pavese

Organizations

- Kentucky Chamber of Commerce
Marianne Proctor

Organizations

- Americans for Prosperity-Kentucky
- Kentucky Liberty Caucus
- Kentucky Right to Life Victory PAC
- Make Liberty Win PAC
- Northern Kentucky Right to Life PAC
- NRA Political Victory Fund

==== Fundraising ====
Final campaign finance reports
Candidate	Raised	Spent	Cash on hand
Christopher Pavese	$49,086.56	$49,086.56	$0.00
Marianne Proctor	$45,838.79	$45,838.79	$0.00
Source: Kentucky Registry of Election Finance

==== Results ====
Results by precinct: Proctor: 60–70%; 70–80%; 80–90%

Republican primary results
Party	Candidate	Votes	%
Republican	Marianne Proctor (incumbent)	3,153	76.5
Republican	Christopher Pavese	970	23.5
Total votes		4,123	100.0

=== General election ===
==== Endorsements ====
Deborah Ison Flowers (D)

Organizations

- Emerge Kentucky
- Kentuckians for the Commonwealth New Power PAC
- Kentucky AFL-CIO
- Kentucky Sierra Club
- Planned Parenthood Action Fund
- United Auto Workers
Marianne Proctor (R)

Organizations

- Kentucky Fraternal Order of Police
- Kentucky Right to Life Victory PAC
- Northern Kentucky Right to Life PAC
- NRA Political Victory Fund

==== Results ====
2024 Kentucky House of Representatives 60th district election
Party	Candidate	Votes	%
Republican	Marianne Proctor (incumbent)	16,017	66.5
Democratic	Deborah Ison Flowers	8,060	33.5
Total votes		24,077	100.0
Republican hold			

== District 61 ==
=== Republican primary ===
==== Candidates ====
===== Nominee =====
- Savannah Maddox, incumbent representative

===== Eliminated in primary =====
- Jarrod M. Lykins, candidate for this district in 2022

==== Endorsements ====
Savannah Maddox

Organizations

- Kentucky Liberty Caucus
- Kentucky Right to Life Victory PAC
- Northern Kentucky Right to Life PAC
- NRA Political Victory Fund

==== Fundraising ====
Campaign finance reports as of June 24, 2024
Candidate	Raised	Spent	Cash on hand
Jarrod M. Lykins	$0.00	$0.00	$0.00
Savannah Maddox	$34,451.48	$16,611.48	$17,840.00
Source: Kentucky Registry of Election Finance

==== Results ====
Republican primary results
Party	Candidate	Votes	%
Republican	Savannah Maddox (incumbent)	2,756	82.9
Republican	Jarrod M. Lykins	568	17.1
Total votes		3,324	100.0

=== General election ===
==== Results ====
2024 Kentucky House of Representatives 61st district election
Party	Candidate	Votes	%
Republican	Savannah Maddox (incumbent)	Unopposed	
Total votes		18,073	100.0
Republican hold			

== District 62 ==
Incumbent Representative Phillip R. Pratt was retiring.

=== Democratic primary ===
==== Candidates ====
===== Nominee =====
- Kevin Kidwell, member of the Scott County Board of Education (2015–2023)

=== Republican primary ===
==== Candidates ====
===== Nominee =====
- Tony Hampton, Scott County sheriff (2011–2024)

===== Eliminated in primary =====
- Bill Parker, former Scott County magistrate and candidate for county judge/executive in 2014

==== Endorsements ====
Tony Hampton

State legislators

- Phillip Pratt, state representative from the 62nd district (2017–2025)

Organizations

- Kentucky Chamber of Commerce
- NRA Political Victory Fund

==== Fundraising ====
Final campaign finance reports
Candidate	Raised	Spent	Cash on hand
Tony Hampton	$24,715.40	$21,177.96	$3,537.44
Bill Parker	$6,821.15	$6,821.15	$0.00
Source: Kentucky Registry of Election Finance

==== Results ====
Results by precinct: Hampton: 60–70%; 70–80%

Republican primary results
Party	Candidate	Votes	%
Republican	Tony Hampton	2,895	70.1
Republican	Bill Parker	1,232	29.9
Total votes		4,127	100.0

=== General election ===
==== Endorsements ====
Kevin Kidwell (D)

Organizations

- Kentuckians for the Commonwealth New Power PAC
- Kentucky AFL-CIO
- Kentucky Fraternal Order of Police
- Kentucky Sierra Club
- United Auto Workers
Tony Hampton (R)

Organizations

- Kentucky Chamber of Commerce
- NRA Political Victory Fund

==== Results ====
2024 Kentucky House of Representatives 62nd district election
Party	Candidate	Votes	%
Republican	Tony Hampton	14,937	66.4
Democratic	Kevin Kidwell	7,565	33.6
Total votes		22,502	100.0
Republican hold			

== District 63 ==
=== Republican primary ===
==== Candidates ====
- Kim Banta, incumbent representative

=== General election ===
==== Results ====
2024 Kentucky House of Representatives 63rd district election
Party	Candidate	Votes	%
Republican	Kim Banta (incumbent)	Unopposed	
Total votes		14,325	100.0
Republican hold			

== District 64 ==
=== Democratic primary ===
==== Candidates ====
===== Nominee =====
- Heather Crabbe, attorney

=== Republican primary ===
==== Candidates ====
===== Nominee =====
- Kimberly Poore Moser, incumbent representative

===== Eliminated in primary =====
- Karen Campbell, realtor

==== Endorsements ====
Karen Campbell

Organizations

- Kentucky Liberty Caucus
- Northern Kentucky Right to Life PAC
Kimberly Poore Moser

Organizations

- Kentucky Chamber of Commerce
- Kentucky Right to Life Victory PAC
- NRA Political Victory Fund

==== Fundraising ====
Final campaign finance reports
Candidate	Raised	Spent	Cash on hand
Karen Campbell	$11,229.00	$7,926.67	$3,302.33
Kimberly Poore Moser	$209,193.50	$142,103.20	$67,090.30
Source: Kentucky Registry of Election Finance

==== Results ====
Results by precinct: Moser: 50–60%; 60–70%; Campbell: 50–60%; 60–70%; 90–100%

Republican primary results
Party	Candidate	Votes	%
Republican	Kimberly Poore Moser (incumbent)	1,542	51.4
Republican	Karen Campbell	1,458	48.6
Total votes		3,000	100.0

=== General election ===
==== Endorsements ====
Heather Crabbe (D)

Organizations

- Kentuckians for the Commonwealth New Power PAC
- Kentucky AFL-CIO
- United Auto Workers
Kimberly Poore Moser (R)

Organizations

- Kentucky Chamber of Commerce
- Kentucky Fraternal Order of Police
- Kentucky Right to Life Victory PAC
- NRA Political Victory Fund

==== Results ====
2024 Kentucky House of Representatives 64th district election
Party	Candidate	Votes	%
Republican	Kimberly Poore Moser (incumbent)	14,407	66.1
Democratic	Heather Crabbe	7,390	33.9
Total votes		21,797	100.0
Republican hold			

== District 65 ==
=== Democratic primary ===
==== Candidates ====
===== Nominee =====
- Aaron Currin, public defender

=== Republican primary ===
==== Candidates ====
===== Nominee =====
- Stephanie Ann Dietz, incumbent representative

=== General election ===
==== Endorsements ====
Aaron Currin (D)

Statewide officials

- Andy Beshear, governor of Kentucky (2019–present)

Organizations

- Kentucky AFL-CIO
- United Auto Workers
Stephanie Ann Dietz (R)

Organizations

- Kentucky Chamber of Commerce
- Kentucky Fraternal Order of Police
- NRA Political Victory Fund

==== Results ====
2024 Kentucky House of Representatives 65th district election
Party	Candidate	Votes	%
Republican	Stephanie Ann Dietz (incumbent)	11,284	56.3
Democratic	Aaron Currin	8,753	43.7
Total votes		20,037	100.0
Republican hold			

== District 66 ==
Incumbent Representative Steve Rawlings was retiring to run for the 11th senate district.

=== Democratic primary ===
==== Candidates ====
===== Nominee =====
- Peggy Houston-Nienaber

=== Republican primary ===
==== Campaign ====
On January 22, the Boone County Republican Party censured Massey for donating to Democratic candidates in 2008 and 2010, as well as voting against impeaching Democratic governor Andy Beshear.

==== Candidates ====
===== Nominee =====
- T. J. Roberts, Republican operative

===== Eliminated in primary =====
- C. Ed Massey, representative from the 66th district (2019–2023)

==== Endorsements ====
C. Ed Massey

Executive branch officials

- Kelly Craft, former U.S. Ambassador to the United Nations (2019–2021) and candidate for governor of Kentucky in 2023

Organizations

- Kentucky Chamber of Commerce
- Kentucky Educators' PAC
- NRA Political Victory Fund
T. J. Roberts

U.S. representatives

- Thomas Massie, U.S. representative from KY-04 (2012–present)
- Ron Paul, U.S. representative from TX-14 (1997–2013) and TX-22 (1976–1977, 1979–1985)

State legislators

- Steven Doan, state representative from the 69th district (2023–present)
- Mark Hart, state representative from the 78th district (2017–present)
- Savannah Maddox, state representative from the 61st district (2019–present)
- Candy Massaroni, state representative from the 50th district (2023–present)
- Gex Williams, state senator from the 20th district (2023–present) and the 24th district (1993–1999)

Individuals

- Vivek Ramaswamy, entrepreneur and candidate for president in 2024

Organizations

- Kentucky Liberty Caucus
- Kentucky Right to Life Victory PAC
- Northern Kentucky Right to Life PAC

==== Fundraising ====
Final campaign finance reports
Candidate	Raised	Spent	Cash on hand
C. Ed Massey	$129,141.98	$129,141.98	$0.00
T. J. Roberts	$63,076.11	$63,076.11	$0.00
Source: Kentucky Registry of Election Finance

==== Results ====
Results by precinct: Roberts: 60–70%; 70–80%; 80–90%

Republican primary results
Party	Candidate	Votes	%
Republican	T. J. Roberts	3,365	74.2
Republican	C. Ed Massey	1,173	25.8
Total votes		4,538	100.0

=== General election ===
==== Endorsements ====
Peggy Houston-Nienaber (D)

Organizations

- Kentuckians for the Commonwealth New Power PAC
- Kentucky AFL-CIO
- United Auto Workers
T. J. Roberts (R)

Organizations

- Kentucky Fraternal Order of Police
- Kentucky Right to Life Victory PAC
- Northern Kentucky Right to Life PAC
- NRA Political Victory Fund

==== Results ====
2024 Kentucky House of Representatives 66th district election
Party	Candidate	Votes	%
Republican	T. J. Roberts	16,368	70.5
Democratic	Peggy Houston-Nienaber	6,861	29.5
Total votes		23,229	100.0
Republican hold			

== District 67 ==
Incumbent Representative and House Minority Whip Rachel Roberts was retiring.

=== Democratic primary ===
==== Candidates ====
===== Nominee =====
- Matthew Lehman, medical consultant and Democratic nominee for Kentucky's 4th congressional district in 2022

===== Withdrawn =====
- Rachel Roberts, incumbent representative (withdrew December 20, 2023)

=== Republican primary ===
==== Candidates ====
===== Nominee =====
- Terry W. Hatton, candidate for Bellevue city council in 2018 and 2022

===== Eliminated in primary =====
- Brian K. Ormes

===== Withdrawn =====
- Jerry C. Gearding (withdrew February 27, 2024, remained on ballot)

==== Fundraising ====
Final campaign finance reports
Candidate	Raised	Spent	Cash on hand
Terry W. Hatton	$17,165.59	$14,076.05	$3,089.54
Brian K. Ormes	Has not filed		
Source: Kentucky Registry of Election Finance

==== Results ====
Republican primary results
Party	Candidate	Votes	%
Republican	Terry W. Hatton	909	81.7
Republican	Brian K. Ormes	203	18.3
Total votes		1,112	100.0

=== General election ===
==== Endorsements ====
Matthew Lehman (D)

Statewide officials

- Andy Beshear, governor of Kentucky (2019–present)

Organizations

- The Fairness Campaign
- Kentuckians for the Commonwealth New Power PAC
- Kentucky AFL-CIO
- Kentucky Sierra Club
- United Auto Workers
Terry W. Hatton (R)

Organizations

- Kentucky Fraternal Order of Police

==== Results ====
2024 Kentucky House of Representatives 67th district election
Party	Candidate	Votes	%
Democratic	Matthew Lehman	9,435	50.08
Republican	Terry W. Hatton	9,405	49.92
Total votes		18,840	100.0
Democratic hold			

== District 68 ==
=== Democratic primary ===
==== Candidates ====
===== Nominee =====
- K. Brandon Long, teacher and minister

=== Republican primary ===
==== Candidates ====
===== Nominee =====
- Mike Clines, incumbent representative

=== General election ===
==== Endorsements ====
K. Brandon Long (D)

Organizations

- The Fairness Campaign
- Kentuckians for the Commonwealth New Power PAC
- Kentucky AFL-CIO
- Kentucky Sierra Club
- Planned Parenthood Action Fund
- Run for Something
- United Auto Workers
Mike Clines (R)

Organizations

- Kentucky Chamber of Commerce
- Kentucky Fraternal Order of Police
- NRA Political Victory Fund
Declined to endorse

Organizations

- Northern Kentucky Right to Life PAC

==== Results ====
2024 Kentucky House of Representatives 68th district election
Party	Candidate	Votes	%
Republican	Mike Clines (incumbent)	16,325	65.9
Democratic	K. Brandon Long	8,456	34.1
Total votes		24,781	100.0
Republican hold			

== District 69 ==
=== Democratic primary ===
==== Candidates ====
===== Nominee =====
- Wilanne Stangel, librarian

=== Republican primary ===
==== Candidates ====
===== Nominee =====
- Steven Doan, incumbent representative

===== Eliminated in primary =====
- Diane Brown

==== Endorsements ====
Diane Brown

Organizations

- Kentucky Chamber of Commerce
Steven Doan

Organizations

- Kentucky Liberty Caucus
- Kentucky Right to Life Victory PAC
- Make Liberty Win PAC
- Northern Kentucky Right to Life PAC
- NRA Political Victory Fund

==== Fundraising ====
Final campaign finance reports
Candidate	Raised	Spent	Cash on hand
Diane Brown	$11,440.00	$10,156.38	$1,283.62
Steven Doan	$54,511.97	$54,511.97	$0.00
Source: Kentucky Registry of Election Finance

==== Results ====
Results by precinct: Doan: 50–60%; 60–70%; 70–80%; 80–90%

Republican primary results
Party	Candidate	Votes	%
Republican	Steven Doan (incumbent)	1,675	75.8
Republican	Diane Brown	534	24.2
Total votes		2,209	100.0

=== General election ===
==== Endorsements ====
Wilanne Stangel (D)

Organizations

- Emerge Kentucky
- Kentuckians for the Commonwealth New Power PAC
- Kentucky AFL-CIO
- Kentucky Sierra Club
- United Auto Workers
Steven Doan (R)

Organizations

- Kentucky Fraternal Order of Police
- Kentucky Right to Life Victory PAC
- Northern Kentucky Right to Life PAC
- NRA Political Victory Fund

==== Results ====
2024 Kentucky House of Representatives 69th district election
Party	Candidate	Votes	%
Republican	Steven Doan (incumbent)	10,814	62.2
Democratic	Wilanne Stangel	6,563	37.8
Total votes		17,377	100.0
Republican hold			

== District 70 ==
=== Republican primary ===
==== Candidates ====
- William Lee Lawrence, incumbent representative

=== General election ===
==== Results ====
2024 Kentucky House of Representatives 70th district election
Party	Candidate	Votes	%
Republican	William Lee Lawrence (incumbent)	Unopposed	
Total votes		17,507	100.0
Republican hold			

== District 71 ==
=== Democratic primary ===
==== Candidates ====
===== Nominee =====
- Rachelle Riddle

=== Republican primary ===
==== Candidates ====
===== Nominee =====
- Josh Bray, incumbent representative

=== General election ===
==== Endorsements ====
Rachelle Riddle (D)

Organizations

- Kentucky AFL-CIO
- United Auto Workers
Josh Bray (R)

Organizations

- Kentucky Chamber of Commerce
- Kentucky Fraternal Order of Police
- NRA Political Victory Fund

==== Results ====
2024 Kentucky House of Representatives 71st district election
Party	Candidate	Votes	%
Republican	Josh Bray (incumbent)	15,168	77.7
Democratic	Rachelle Riddle	4,350	22.3
Total votes		19,518	100.0
Republican hold			

== District 72 ==
=== Republican primary ===
==== Candidates ====
- Matthew R. Koch, incumbent representative

=== General election ===
==== Results ====
2024 Kentucky House of Representatives 72nd district election
Party	Candidate	Votes	%
Republican	Matthew R. Koch (incumbent)	Unopposed	
Total votes		15,453	100.0
Republican hold			

== District 73 ==
=== Democratic primary ===
==== Candidates ====
===== Nominee =====
- Rory Houlihan, candidate for the Democratic nomination for this district in 2018, 2020, and 2022; candidate for the U. S. Senate in 2016

=== Republican primary ===
==== Candidates ====
===== Nominee =====
- D. Ryan Dotson, incumbent representative

=== General election ===
==== Endorsements ====
D. Ryan Dotson (R)

Organizations

- Kentucky Chamber of Commerce
- Kentucky Fraternal Order of Police
- NRA Political Victory Fund

==== Results ====
2024 Kentucky House of Representatives 73rd district election
Party	Candidate	Votes	%
Republican	D. Ryan Dotson (incumbent)	12,847	60.2
Democratic	Rory Houlihan	8,498	39.8
Total votes		21,345	100.0
Republican hold			

== District 74 ==
=== Republican primary ===
==== Candidates ====
- David Hale, incumbent representative

=== General election ===
==== Results ====
2024 Kentucky House of Representatives 74th district election
Party	Candidate	Votes	%
Republican	David Hale (incumbent)	Unopposed	
Total votes		17,010	100.0
Republican hold			

== District 75 ==
=== Democratic primary ===
==== Candidates ====
- Lindsey Burke, incumbent representative

=== General election ===
==== Results ====
2024 Kentucky House of Representatives 75th district election
Party	Candidate	Votes	%
Democratic	Lindsey Burke (incumbent)	Unopposed	
Total votes		11,561	100.0
Democratic hold			

== District 76 ==
Incumbent Representative Ruth Ann Palumbo was retiring.

=== Democratic primary ===
==== Candidates ====
===== Nominee =====
- Anne Gay Donworth, Lexington Public Library director of development, marketing, and communications

===== Eliminated in primary =====
- Joshua Daniel Buckman, social worker and write-in candidate for the Kentucky Senate in 2022
- James “Jamie” Palumbo

==== Endorsements ====
Joshua Daniel Buckman

Organizations

- Kentuckians for the Commonwealth New Power PAC
Anne Gay Donworth

Organizations

- Emerge Kentucky
James “Jamie” Palumbo

Newspapers

- The Lexington Herald-Leader

Organizations

- The Fairness Campaign
- Kentucky AFL-CIO
- Kentucky Educators' PAC
- Kentucky Sierra Club
- LGBTQ Victory Fund

==== Fundraising ====
Final campaign finance reports
Candidate	Raised	Spent	Cash on hand
Joshua Daniel Buckman	$7,566.00	$7,566.00	$0.00
Anne Gay Donworth	$93,079.00	$90,842.46	$2,236.54
James “Jamie” Palumbo	$153,813.81	$132,170.26	$21,643.55
Source: Kentucky Registry of Election Finance

==== Results ====
Results by precinct: Donworth: 30–40%; 40–50%; 50–60%; 60–70%; Palumbo: 40–50%; 50–60%; Buckman: 30–40%; Tie: 30–40%; 40–50%

Democratic primary results
Party	Candidate	Votes	%
Democratic	Anne Gay Donworth	1,777	44.4
Democratic	James “Jamie” Palumbo	1,627	40.7
Democratic	Joshua Daniel Buckman	594	14.9
Total votes		3,998	100.0

=== General election ===
==== Results ====
2024 Kentucky House of Representatives 76th district election
Party	Candidate	Votes	%
Democratic	Anne Gay Donworth	Unopposed	
Total votes		14,790	100.0
Democratic hold			

== District 77 ==
=== Democratic primary ===
==== Candidates ====
===== Nominee =====
- George A. Brown Jr., incumbent representative

===== Eliminated in primary =====
- Daniel E. Whitley, attorney

==== Endorsements ====
George A. Brown Jr.

Organizations

- Kentuckians for the Commonwealth New Power PAC
- Kentucky AFL-CIO
- Kentucky Educators' PAC
Daniel E. Whitley

Newspapers

- The Lexington Herald-Leader

==== Fundraising ====
Final campaign finance reports
Candidate	Raised	Spent	Cash on hand
George A. Brown Jr.	$39,111.17	$28,528.12	$10,583.05
Daniel E. Whitley	$21,234.42	$21,066.58	$167.84
Source: Kentucky Registry of Election Finance

==== Results ====
Results by precinct: Brown Jr.: 50–60%; 60–70%; 70–80%; Whitley: 50–60%; Tie: 50%

Democratic primary results
Party	Candidate	Votes	%
Democratic	George A. Brown Jr. (incumbent)	2,128	63.3
Democratic	Daniel E. Whitley	1,234	36.7
Total votes		3,362	100.0

=== Republican primary ===
==== Candidates ====
===== Nominee =====
- Jason Griffith, Toyota Motor Manufacturing Kentucky employee

=== General election ===
==== Endorsements ====
George A. Brown Jr. (D)

Organizations

- The Fairness Campaign
- Kentucky AFL-CIO
- United Auto Workers

==== Results ====
2024 Kentucky House of Representatives 77th district election
Party	Candidate	Votes	%
Democratic	George A. Brown Jr. (incumbent)	12,808	72.5
Republican	Jason Griffith	4,862	27.5
Total votes		17,670	100.0
Democratic hold			

== District 78 ==
=== Republican primary ===
==== Candidates ====
===== Nominee =====
- Mark Hart, incumbent representative

=== Independent candidates ===
- Timothy D. Johnson

=== General election ===
==== Endorsements ====
Mark Hart (R)

Organizations

- Kentucky Chamber of Commerce
- Kentucky Fraternal Order of Police
- Kentucky Right to Life Victory PAC
- Northern Kentucky Right to Life PAC
- NRA Political Victory Fund

==== Results ====
2024 Kentucky House of Representatives 78th district election
Party	Candidate	Votes	%
Republican	Mark Hart (incumbent)	17,024	81.9
Independent	Timothy D. Johnson	3,770	18.1
Total votes		20,794	100.0
Republican hold			

== District 79 ==
=== Democratic primary ===
==== Candidates ====
- Chad Aull, incumbent representative

=== General election ===
==== Results ====
2024 Kentucky House of Representatives 79th district election
Party	Candidate	Votes	%
Democratic	Chad Aull (incumbent)	Unopposed	
Total votes		12,659	100.0
Democratic hold			

== District 80 ==
=== Republican primary ===
==== Candidates ====
- David Meade, incumbent representative

=== General election ===
==== Results ====
2024 Kentucky House of Representatives 80th district election
Party	Candidate	Votes	%
Republican	David Meade (incumbent)	Unopposed	
Total votes		17,542	100.0
Republican hold			

== District 81 ==
=== Republican primary ===
==== Candidates ====
- Deanna Frazier Gordon, incumbent representative

=== General election ===
==== Results ====
2024 Kentucky House of Representatives 81st district election
Party	Candidate	Votes	%
Republican	Deanna Frazier Gordon (incumbent)	Unopposed	
Total votes		17,129	100.0
Republican hold			

== District 82 ==
=== Republican primary ===
==== Candidates ====
- Nick Wilson, incumbent representative

=== General election ===
==== Results ====
2024 Kentucky House of Representatives 82nd district election
Party	Candidate	Votes	%
Republican	Nick Wilson (incumbent)	Unopposed	
Total votes		15,343	100.0
Republican hold			

== District 83 ==
=== Republican primary ===
==== Candidates ====
- Josh Branscum, incumbent representative

=== General election ===
==== Results ====
2024 Kentucky House of Representatives 83rd district election
Party	Candidate	Votes	%
Republican	Josh Branscum (incumbent)	Unopposed	
Total votes		18,293	100.0
Republican hold			

== District 84 ==
=== Democratic primary ===
==== Candidates ====
===== Nominee =====
- Zackary H. Hall, nonprofit worker and former teacher

=== Republican primary ===
==== Candidates ====
===== Nominee =====
- Chris Fugate, incumbent representative

=== General election ===
==== Endorsements ====
Zackary H. Hall (D)

Organizations

- Kentuckians for the Commonwealth New Power PAC
- Kentucky AFL-CIO
- United Mine Workers of America
Chris Fugate (R)

Organizations

- Kentucky Fraternal Order of Police
- NRA Political Victory Fund

==== Results ====
2024 Kentucky House of Representatives 84th district election
Party	Candidate	Votes	%
Republican	Chris Fugate (incumbent)	10,607	65.1
Democratic	Zackary H. Hall	5,698	34.9
Total votes		16,305	100.0
Republican hold			

== District 85 ==
=== Republican primary ===
==== Candidates ====
- R. Shane Baker, incumbent representative

=== General election ===
==== Results ====
2024 Kentucky House of Representatives 85th district election
Party	Candidate	Votes	%
Republican	R. Shane Baker (incumbent)	Unopposed	
Total votes		17,978	100.0
Republican hold			

== District 86 ==
=== Republican primary ===
==== Candidates ====
===== Nominee =====
- Tom O’dell Smith, incumbent representative

===== Eliminated in primary =====
- Billy J. Taylor

==== Endorsements ====
Tom O’dell Smith

Organizations

- Kentucky Chamber of Commerce
- Kentucky Right to Life Victory PAC
- NRA Political Victory Fund

==== Results ====
Republican primary results
Party	Candidate	Votes	%
Republican	Tom O’dell Smith (incumbent)	2,913	63.0
Republican	Billy J. Taylor	1,710	37.0
Total votes		4,623	100.0

=== General election ===
==== Results ====
2024 Kentucky House of Representatives 86th district election
Party	Candidate	Votes	%
Republican	Tom O’dell Smith (incumbent)	Unopposed	
Total votes		15,285	100.0
Republican hold			

== District 87 ==
=== Republican primary ===
==== Candidates ====
- Adam Bowling, incumbent representative

=== General election ===
==== Results ====
2024 Kentucky House of Representatives 87th district election
Party	Candidate	Votes	%
Republican	Adam Bowling (incumbent)	Unopposed	
Total votes		13,490	100.0
Republican hold			

== District 88 ==
=== Democratic primary ===
==== Candidates ====
===== Nominee =====
- Cherlynn Stevenson, incumbent representative

=== Republican primary ===
==== Candidates ====
===== Nominee =====
- Vanessa Grossl, civil servant and former teacher

=== General election ===
==== Endorsements ====
Cherlynn Stevenson (D)

Statewide officials

- Andy Beshear, governor of Kentucky (2019–present)

Newspapers

- The Lexington Herald-Leader

Organizations

- The Fairness Campaign
- Kentuckians for the Commonwealth New Power PAC
- Kentucky AFL-CIO
- Kentucky Sierra Club
- Planned Parenthood Action Fund
- United Auto Workers
- United Mine Workers of America
Vanessa Grossl (R)

Organizations

- Americans for Prosperity-Kentucky
Declined to endorse

Organizations

- NRA Political Victory Fund

==== Results ====
2024 Kentucky House of Representatives 88th district election
Party	Candidate	Votes	%
Republican	Vanessa Grossl	11,722	50.3
Democratic	Cherlynn Stevenson (incumbent)	11,597	49.7
Total votes		23,319	100.0
Republican gain from Democratic			

== District 89 ==
=== Republican primary ===
==== Candidates ====
===== Nominee =====
- Timmy Truett, incumbent representative

===== Eliminated in primary =====
- Idalia Holland

==== Endorsements ====
Timmy Truett

Organizations

- Kentucky AFL-CIO
- Kentucky Educators' PAC
- Kentucky Liberty Caucus
- Kentucky Right to Life Victory PAC
- NRA Political Victory Fund

==== Results ====
Republican primary results
Party	Candidate	Votes	%
Republican	Timmy Truett (incumbent)	3,018	89.0
Republican	Idalia Holland	374	11.0
Total votes		3,392	100.0

=== General election ===
==== Results ====
2024 Kentucky House of Representatives 89th district election
Party	Candidate	Votes	%
Republican	Timmy Truett (incumbent)	Unopposed	
Total votes		17,867	100.0
Republican hold			

== District 90 ==
=== Republican primary ===
==== Candidates ====
- Derek Lewis, incumbent representative

=== General election ===
==== Results ====
2024 Kentucky House of Representatives 90th district election
Party	Candidate	Votes	%
Republican	Derek Lewis (incumbent)	Unopposed	
Total votes		16,293	100.0
Republican hold			

== District 91 ==
=== Republican primary ===
==== Candidates ====
===== Nominee =====
- Billy E. Wesley, incumbent representative

===== Eliminated in primary =====
- Darrell Billings, farmer and candidate for this district in 2022

==== Endorsements ====
Darrell W. Billings

U.S. representatives

- Andy Barr, U.S. representative from KY-06 (2013–present)
- James Comer, U.S. representative from KY-01 (2016–present)

Statewide officials

- Mark Metcalf, Kentucky State Treasurer (2024–present)
- Jonathan Shell, Kentucky Commissioner of Agriculture (2024–present)

Organizations

- Kentucky Chamber of Commerce
Billy E. Wesley

Organizations

- Kentucky Liberty Caucus
- Kentucky Right to Life Victory PAC
- NRA Political Victory Fund

==== Fundraising ====
Final campaign finance reports
Candidate	Raised	Spent	Cash on hand
Darrell W. Billings	$88,904.87	$88,904.87	$0.00
Billy E. Wesley	$26,725.00	$26,645.47	$79.53
Source: Kentucky Registry of Election Finance

==== Results ====
Republican primary results
Party	Candidate	Votes	%
Republican	Billy E. Wesley (incumbent)	1,673	53.2
Republican	Darrell W. Billings	1,470	46.8
Total votes		3,143	100.0

=== General election ===
==== Results ====
2024 Kentucky House of Representatives 91st district election
Party	Candidate	Votes	%
Republican	Billy E. Wesley (incumbent)	Unopposed	
Total votes		14,878	100.0
Republican hold			

== District 92 ==
=== Republican primary ===
==== Candidates ====
- John Blanton, incumbent representative

=== General election ===
==== Results ====
2024 Kentucky House of Representatives 92nd district election
Party	Candidate	Votes	%
Republican	John Blanton (incumbent)	Unopposed	
Total votes		14,751	100.0
Republican hold			

== District 93 ==
=== Democratic primary ===
==== Candidates ====
===== Nominee =====
- Adrielle Camuel, incumbent representative

===== Eliminated in primary =====
- Sarah Ritter, Lexington tourism employee

==== Endorsements ====
Adrielle Camuel

Newspapers

- The Lexington Herald-Leader

Organizations

- The Fairness Campaign
- Kentucky AFL-CIO
- Kentucky Sierra Club

==== Fundraising ====
Final campaign finance reports
Candidate	Raised	Spent	Cash on hand
Adrielle Camuel	$52,227.37	$47,466.04	$4,761.33
Sarah Ritter	$17,654.36	$17,298.34	$356.02
Source: Kentucky Registry of Election Finance

==== Results ====
Results by precinct: Camuel: 50–60%; 60–70%; 70–80%; 80–90%; 90–100%

Democratic primary results
Party	Candidate	Votes	%
Democratic	Adrielle Camuel (incumbent)	1,985	72.6
Democratic	Sarah Ritter	750	27.4
Total votes		2,735	100.0

=== General election ===
==== Results ====
2024 Kentucky House of Representatives 93rd district election
Party	Candidate	Votes	%
Democratic	Adrielle Camuel (incumbent)	Unopposed	
Total votes		13,264	100.0
Democratic hold			

== District 94 ==
Incumbent Representative Jacob D. Justice was retiring.

=== Republican primary ===
==== Candidates ====
- Mitchum Addison Whitaker, attorney and chairman of the Mothers Against Drunk Driving Advisory Board of Kentucky

=== General election ===
==== Results ====
2024 Kentucky House of Representatives 94th district election
Party	Candidate	Votes	%
Republican	Mitchum Addison Whitaker	Unopposed	
Total votes		13,429	100.0
Republican hold			

== District 95 ==
=== Democratic primary ===
==== Candidates ====
===== Nominee =====
- Ashley Tackett Laferty, incumbent representative

=== Republican primary ===
==== Candidates ====
===== Nominee =====
- Brandon Spencer, representative from the 95th district (2007)

===== Eliminated in primary =====
- David Pennington, candidate for the Republican nomination for this district in 2022

==== Endorsements ====
David Pennington

Organizations

- Kentucky Liberty Caucus

==== Results ====
Results by precinct: Spencer: 50–60%; 60–70%; 70–80%; 80–90%; 90–100%; Pennington: 50–60%; 60–70%; 70–80%; Tie: 50%

Republican primary results
Party	Candidate	Votes	%
Republican	Brandon Spencer	967	67.0
Republican	David Pennington	478	33.0
Total votes		1,445	100.0

=== General election ===
==== Endorsements ====
Ashley Tackett Laferty (D)

Organizations

- Democrats for Life of America
- Kentucky AFL-CIO
- Kentucky Fraternal Order of Police
- NRA Political Victory Fund
- United Auto Workers
- United Mine Workers of America

==== Results ====
2024 Kentucky House of Representatives 95th district election
Party	Candidate	Votes	%
Democratic	Ashley Tackett Laferty (incumbent)	10,721	56.3
Republican	Brandon Spencer	8,330	43.7
Total votes		19,051	100.0
Democratic hold			

== District 96 ==
=== Republican primary ===
==== Candidates ====
- Patrick Flannery, incumbent representative

=== General election ===
==== Results ====
2024 Kentucky House of Representatives 96th district election
Party	Candidate	Votes	%
Republican	Patrick Flannery (incumbent)	Unopposed	
Total votes		16,465	100.0
Republican hold			

== District 97 ==
=== Republican primary ===
==== Candidates ====
- Bobby W. McCool, incumbent representative

=== General election ===
==== Results ====
2024 Kentucky House of Representatives 97th district election
Party	Candidate	Votes	%
Republican	Bobby W. McCool (incumbent)	Unopposed	
Total votes		14,907	100.0
Republican hold			

== District 98 ==
Incumbent Representative Danny R. Bentley was retiring.

=== Democratic primary ===
==== Candidates ====
===== Nominee =====
- Tammie Womack, Greenup County constable (2015–2023)

===== Eliminated in primary =====
- Shawn Lawrence Assar, teacher
- James M. Reneau, Shawnee State University professor
- Joe Virgin, insurance agent

==== Fundraising ====
Final campaign finance reports
Candidate	Raised	Spent	Cash on hand
Shawn Lawrence Assar	$2,473.84	$1,046.39	$1,427.45
James M. Reneau	$1,336.77	$1,336.77	$0.00
Joe Virgin	$15,450.00	$15,450.00	$0.00
Tammie Womack	$5,963.60	$5,963.60	$0.00
Source: Kentucky Registry of Election Finance

==== Results ====
Democratic primary results
Party	Candidate	Votes	%
Democratic	Tammie Womack	808	42.3
Democratic	Joe Virgin	766	40.1
Democratic	James M. Reneau	179	9.4
Democratic	Shawn Lawrence Assar	158	8.3
Total votes		1,911	100.0

=== Republican primary ===
==== Candidates ====
===== Nominee =====
- Aaron Thompson, field representative in the Kentucky Department for Local Government

=== General election ===
==== Endorsements ====
Aaron Thompson (R)

Organizations

- Kentucky AFL-CIO
- Kentucky Chamber of Commerce
- NRA Political Victory Fund
- United Auto Workers

==== Results ====
2024 Kentucky House of Representatives 98th district election
Party	Candidate	Votes	%
Republican	Aaron Thompson	15,561	71.9
Democratic	Tammie Womack	6,087	28.1
Total votes		21,648	100.0
Republican hold			

== District 99 ==
=== Republican primary ===
==== Candidates ====
- Richard L. White, incumbent representative

=== General election ===
==== Results ====
2024 Kentucky House of Representatives 99th district election
Party	Candidate	Votes	%
Republican	Richard L. White (incumbent)	Unopposed	
Total votes		13,351	100.0
Republican hold			

== District 100 ==
=== Republican primary ===
==== Candidates ====
- Scott L. Sharp, incumbent representative

=== General election ===
==== Results ====
2024 Kentucky House of Representatives 100th district election
Party	Candidate	Votes	%
Republican	Scott L. Sharp (incumbent)	Unopposed	
Total votes		15,034	100.0
Republican hold			

== See also ==
- 2024 Kentucky elections
  - 2024 Kentucky Senate election
  - 2024 United States House of Representatives elections in Kentucky
