= Courtney Gilbert =

American politician

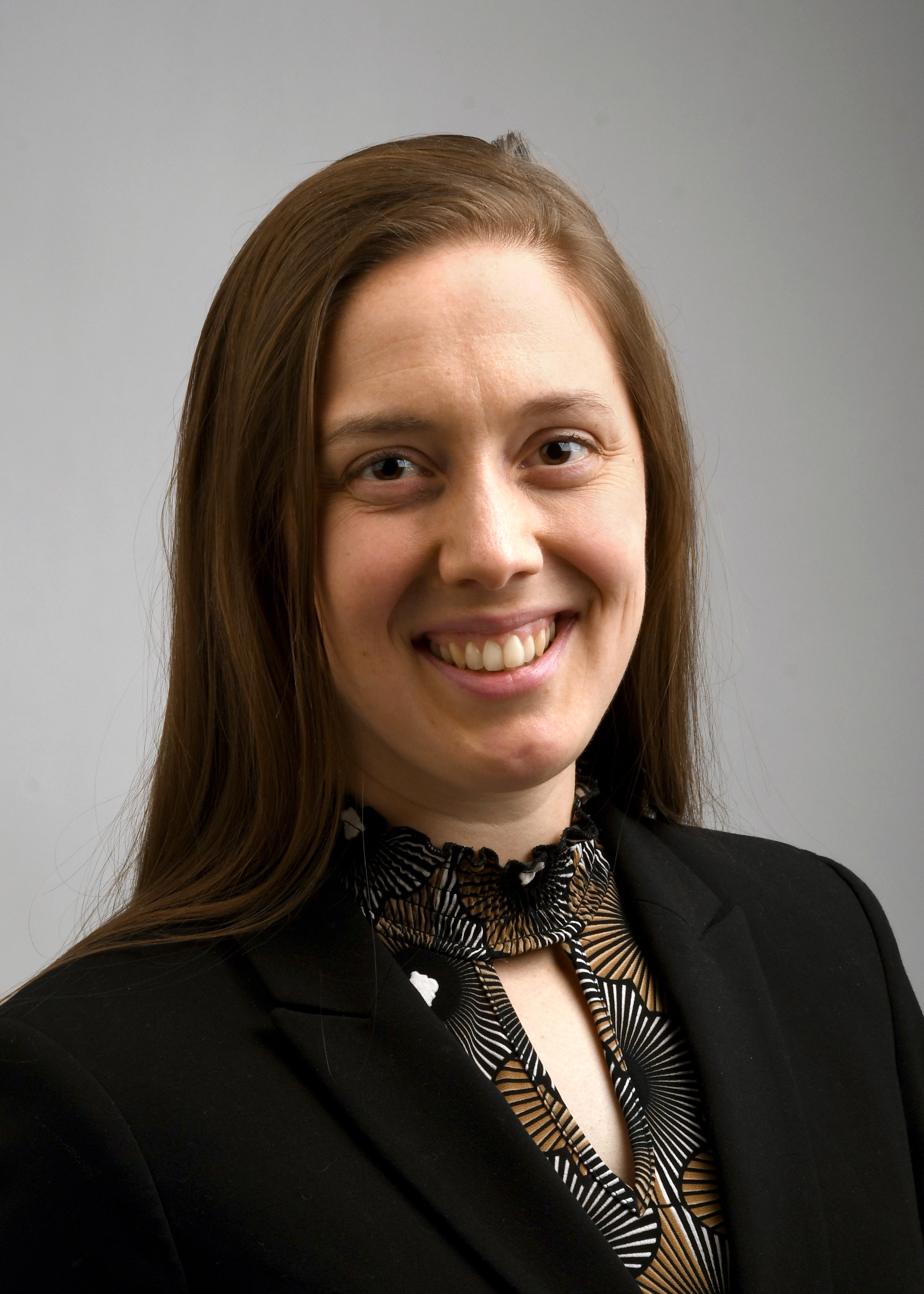

Member of the Kentucky House of Representatives from the 24th district
- In office March 25, 2024 – January 1, 2025
- Preceded by: Brandon Reed
- Succeeded by: Ryan Bivens

Personal details
- Party: Republican
- Relatives: Adrienne Southworth (sister)
- Education: Louisiana Baptist University (BA)
- Committees: Veterans, Military Affairs, and Public Protection (Interim)

Courtney Gilbert (born November 14, 1989) is an American politician from Kentucky who was a Republican member of the Kentucky House of Representatives. She represented Kentucky's 24th District which comprises Green, Hart, and LaRue counties. She was elected in a special election following the resignation of incumbent Brandon Reed, and assumed office on March 25, 2024. She did not seek reelection in 2024.

== Background ==
Gilbert graduated with a Bachelor of Arts in communication and music from Louisiana Baptist University. She is self employed as a private instructor of violin, piano, Spanish and German. She is also a bookkeeper for three small businesses. Gilbert also serves as a Christian missionary.

She is an active member of the LaRue County Republican Party, having served as their youth chair for nine years, as well as a delegate to the 2nd Congressional District and state Republican Party conventions. She is currently a precinct captain.

Gilbert is the sister of Adrienne Southworth, who represented District 7 in the Kentucky Senate from 2021 to 2025.

== Political career ==
=== Elections ===
- 2022 Gilbert was defeated in the 2022 Republican primary for Kentucky's 24th House district, garnering 1,751 votes (31.7%) against incumbent Brandon Reed.
- 2024 Incumbent Brandon Reed resigned in order to take a position with the Kentucky Department of Agriculture. Governor Andy Beshear called for a special election to be held on March 19, 2024. Gilbert won the 2024 special election with 1,025 votes (62.5%) against Democratic candidate Johnny Pennington and Independent candidate Craig Astor. Gilbert did not seek reelection to a full term in the 2024 Kentucky House of Representatives election.
