= Mitch Whitaker =

American politician (born 1993)

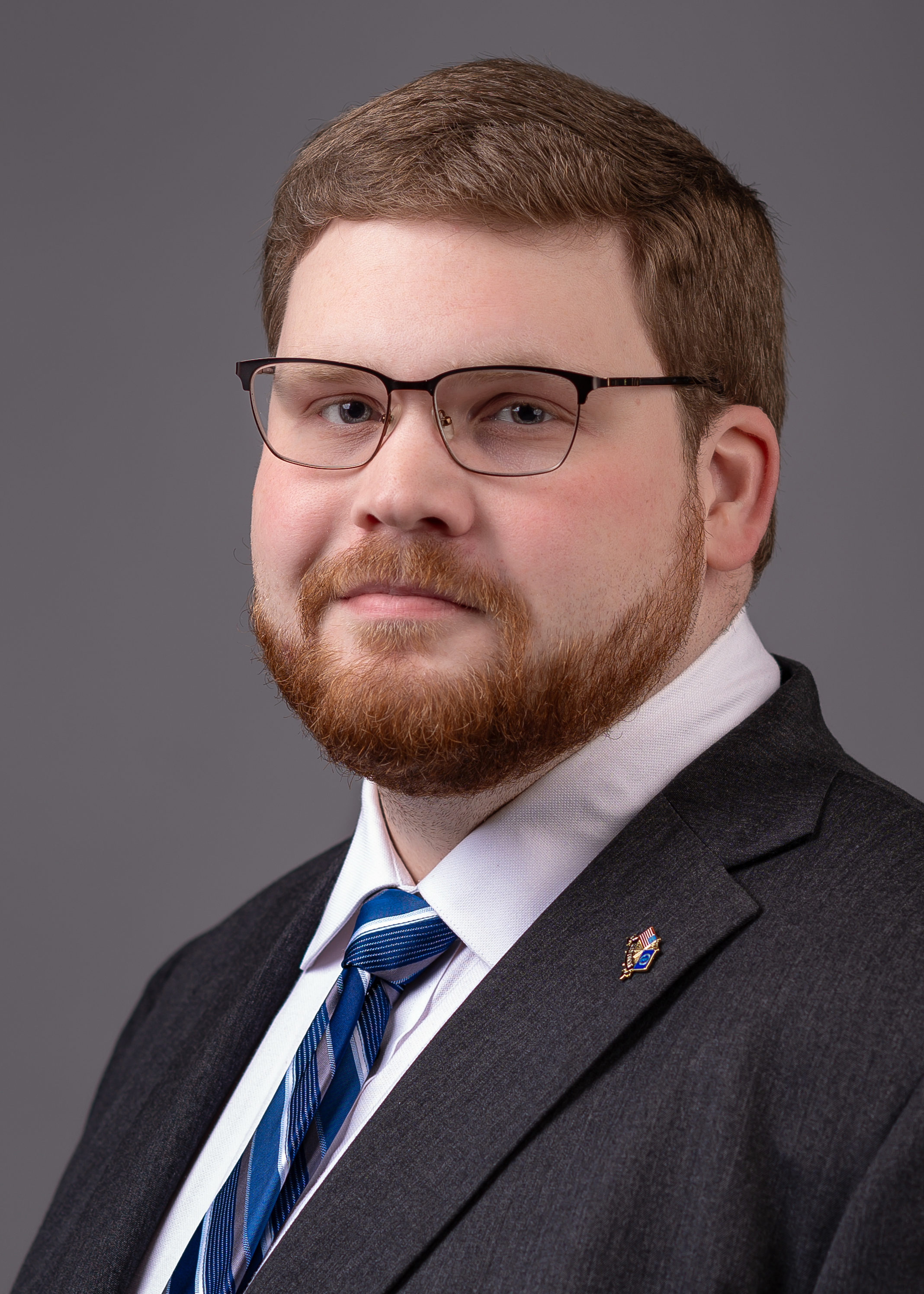
- Official portrait, 2025

Member of the Kentucky House of Representatives from the 94th district
- Incumbent
- Assumed office January 1, 2025
- Preceded by: Jacob Justice

Personal details
- Born: May 12, 1993 (age 33) Letcher County, Kentucky
- Party: Republican
- Education: University of Kentucky (BS, JD)
- Occupation: Attorney

Mitchum Addison Whitaker (born May 12, 1993) is an American attorney and politician who has served as a member of the Kentucky House of Representatives since January 2025. A member of the Republican Party, Whitaker represents Kentucky's 94th House district, which includes Letcher County as well as part of Harlan and Pike counties.

== Background ==
Whitaker was born and raised in Letcher County, Kentucky. When he was 17, his parents were involved in a car accident caused by a drunk driver. His father suffered minor injuries, but his mother died from her injuries the next day.

In 2011, he graduated from Letcher County High School and continued his education at the University of Kentucky. While at UK, he was president of Alpha Gamma Rho, a member of the Interfraternal Council, and completed internships with the Kentucky Department of Agriculture and U.S. Representative Hal Rogers. In 2015, he graduated with a Bachelor of Science degree in agricultural economics and a minor in business. He went on to attend the J. David Rosenberg College of Law, graduating with a Juris Doctor degree in 2021. While in law school, Whitaker served as president of the Appalachian Law Caucus, an at-large representative of the Student Bar Association, and a graduate senator-at-large of the Student Government Association. He also clerked for the personal injury law firm Hicks & Funfsinn, which he joined as an attorney following graduation.

He remained with Hicks & Funfsinn until 2024, and afterwards joined another firm before opening his own practice in 2026. He currently serves as city attorney of both Fleming-Neon and Elkhorn City. He has also served as chair of the Letcher County Republican Party and president of the local Mother's Against Drunk Driving advisory board.

== Political career ==
- 2024 Kentucky's 94th House district incumbent Jacob Justice chose not to seek reelection. Whitaker was unopposed in both the 2024 Republican primary and 2024 Kentucky House of Representatives election, winning the latter with 13,492 votes.
