= David Hourigan =

American politician

Judge/Executive of Marion County
- In office January 3, 1994 – September 11, 2006

Member of the Kentucky House of Representatives from the 24th district
- In office January 1, 1987 – December 1993
- Preceded by: Sam Thomas
- Succeeded by: William Scott

Personal details
- Born: May 27, 1947
- Died: September 11, 2006 (aged 59)
- Party: Democratic

David Ross Hourigan (May 27, 1947 – September 11, 2006) was an American politician from Kentucky who was a member of the Kentucky House of Representatives from 1987 to 1993 and the Judge/Executive of Marion County from 1994 until his death in 2006. Hourigan was first elected to the house in 1986 after incumbent representative Sam Thomas retired. In 1993 he was elected Judge/Executive of Marion County.

He died in September 2006 at age 59.
