= Tony Hampton =

Kentucky politician

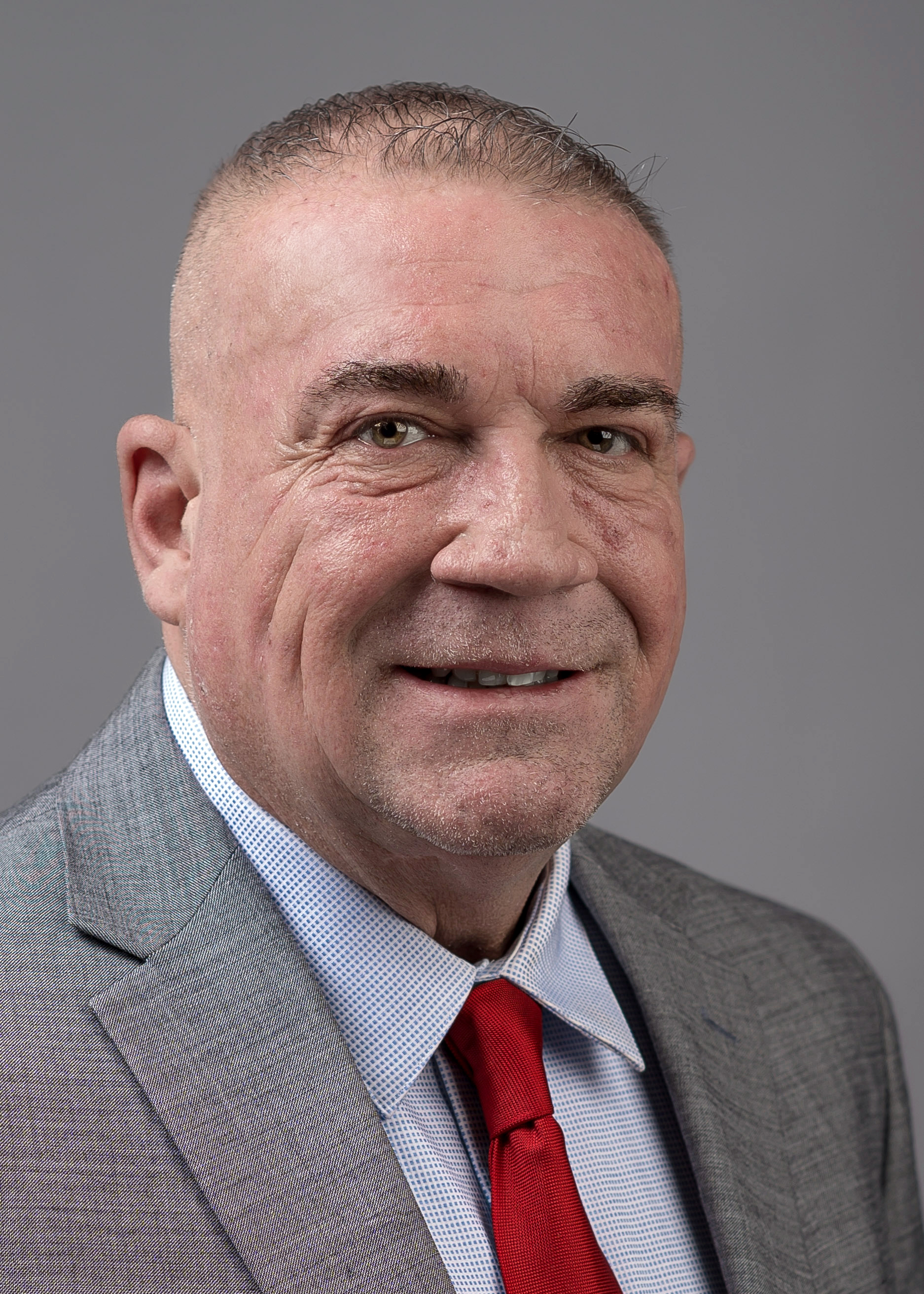

Member of the Kentucky House of Representatives from the 62nd district
- Incumbent
- Assumed office January 1, 2025
- Preceded by: Phillip Pratt

Sheriff of Scott County
- In office January 3, 2011 – October 1, 2024
- Preceded by: Bobby Hammons
- Succeeded by: Jeremy Nettles

Personal details
- Born: August 13, 1971 (age 54)
- Party: Republican

Anthony Joseph Hampton (born August 13, 1971) is an American politician who has served as a member of the Kentucky House of Representatives since January 2025. He represents the 62nd district, which includes part of Scott County. He previously served as sheriff of Scott County from 2011 to 2024.

== Political career ==
Hampton was elected sheriff of Scott County in 2010, defeating Democratic incumbent Bobby Hammons. He was then reelected in 2014, 2018, and 2022. He resigned as sheriff on October 1, 2024, in order to pursue a seat in the Kentucky House of Representatives.

Hampton was elected to the house in the 2024 Kentucky House of Representatives election. He received 66.4 percent of the vote, defeating Democratic candidate Kevin Kidwell. He defeated Bill Parker in the May primary election.

== Electoral history ==
=== 2024 ===
Republican primary results
Party	Candidate	Votes	%
Republican	Tony Hampton	2,895	70.1
Republican	Bill Parker	1,232	29.9
Total votes		4,127	100.0

2024 Kentucky House of Representatives 62nd district election
Party	Candidate	Votes	%
Republican	Tony Hampton	14,937	66.4
Democratic	Kevin Kidwell	7,565	33.6
Total votes		22,502	100.0
Republican hold			

Kentucky House of Representatives
Preceded by Phillip Pratt	Member of the Kentucky House of Representatives from the 62nd district 2025–present	Succeeded by incumbent
