= William Scott (Kentucky politician) =

American politician

Member of the Kentucky House of Representatives from the 24th district
- In office January 13, 1994 – January 1, 2003
- Preceded by: David Hourigan
- Succeeded by: Jimmy Higdon

Personal details
- Born: October 16, 1947 (age 78)
- Party: Democratic

William Upt Scott (born October 16, 1947) is an American politician from Kentucky who was a member of the Kentucky House of Representatives from 1994 to 2003. Scott was first elected in a January 1994 special election after incumbent representative David Hourigan resigned to become Judge/Executive of Marion County. He did not seek reelection in 2002 and was succeeded by Republican Jimmy Higdon.
