= Terry Mills (American politician) =

American politician

Member of the Kentucky House of Representatives from the 24th district
- In office February 8, 2010 – January 1, 2017
- Preceded by: Jimmy Higdon
- Succeeded by: Brandon Reed

Personal details
- Born: October 12, 1950 (age 75)
- Party: Democratic
- Education: Western Kentucky University (B.S.)
- Website: terrymills.org

William Terry Mills (born October 12, 1950) is an American politician and a former Democratic member of the Kentucky House of Representatives who represented District 24. Mills won a February 2010 Special election to fill the vacancy caused by the election of Representative Jimmy Higdon to the Kentucky Senate. He served until he was defeated by Republican candidate Brandon Reed on November 8, 2016.

== Education ==
Mills earned his BS in business from Western Kentucky University.

== Elections ==
- 2016 Mills was unopposed for the May 17, 2016 Democratic Primary and lost the November 8, 2016 General election to Republican nominee Brandon Reed 10,563 votes (54.07%) to 8,972 votes (45.93%).
- 2014 Mills was unopposed for the May 20, 2014 Democratic Primary and won the November 4, 2014 General election with 8,254 votes (54.6%) against Republican nominee J. Alex Larue.
- 2012 Mills was unopposed for the May 22, 2012 Democratic Primary and won the November 6, 2012 General election with 9,288 votes (61.3%) against Republican nominee Bill Pickerill.
- 2010 Special - When District 24 Republican Representative Higdon ran for the remainder of an unexpired Kentucky Senate term, Mills won the February 2010 Special election with 3,001 votes (54.4%) against Republican nominee Leo Johnson.
- 2010 Mills and his Special election opponent Leo Johnson were both unopposed for their May 18, 2010 primaries, setting up a rematch; Mills won the November 2, 2010 General election with 6,204 votes (53.6%) against Johnson.
