= Ryan Bivens =

Kentucky politician

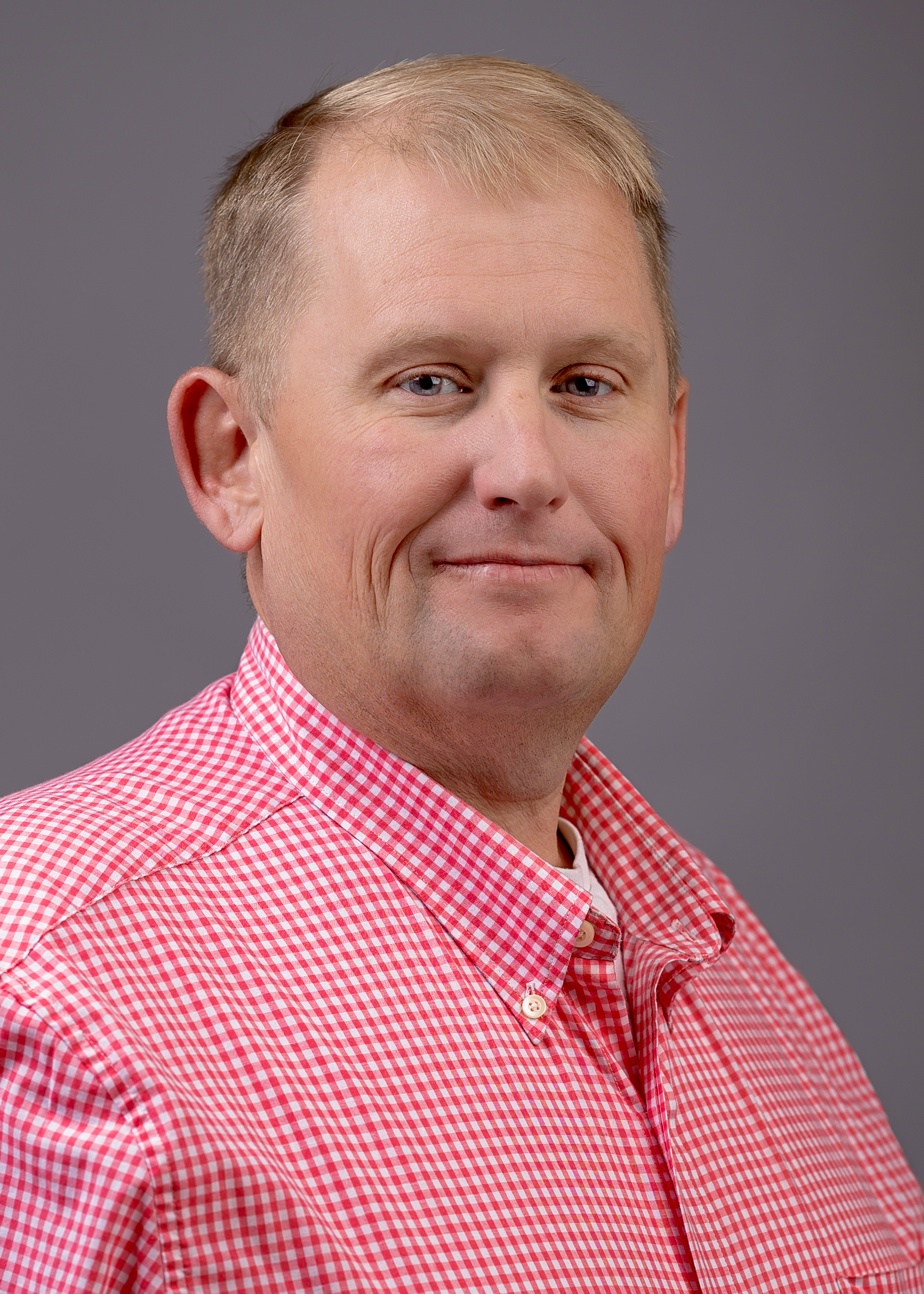

Member of the Kentucky House of Representatives from the 24th district
- Incumbent
- Assumed office January 1, 2025
- Preceded by: Courtney Gilbert

Personal details
- Born: January 29, 1979 (age 47)
- Party: Republican

Ryan Dale Bivens (born January 29, 1979) is an American politician who has served as a member of the Kentucky House of Representatives since January 2025. He represents Kentucky's 24th House district, which includes Green, Hart, and LaRue Counties.

== Political career ==
Bivens was elected in the 2024 Kentucky House of Representatives election. He received 81.6 percent of the vote, defeating Democratic candidate Johnny Pennington. He defeated Asa L. T. Waggoner in the May primary election.

== Electoral history ==
=== 2024 ===
Republican primary results
Party	Candidate	Votes	%
Republican	Ryan Bivens	2,636	75.0
Republican	Asa L. T. Waggoner	878	25.0
Total votes		3,514	100.0

2024 Kentucky House of Representatives 24th district election
Party	Candidate	Votes	%
Republican	Ryan Bivens	17,097	81.6
Democratic	Johnny Pennington	3,860	18.4
Total votes		20,957	100.0
Republican hold			

Kentucky House of Representatives
Preceded by Courtney Gilbert	Member of the Kentucky House of Representatives from the 24th district 2025–present	Succeeded by incumbent
