= Brandon Reed =

American politician

Member of the Kentucky House of Representatives from the 24th district
- In office January 1, 2017 – January 15, 2024
- Preceded by: Terry Mills
- Succeeded by: Courtney Gilbert

Personal details
- Born: October 22, 1980 (age 46)
- Party: Republican

William Brandon Reed (born October 22, 1980) is an American politician from Hodgenville, Kentucky. He is a Republican and represented Kentucky's 24th House district in the Kentucky House of Representatives from 2017 to 2024. Reed is a licensed minister and is involved with various agriculture and farming associations.

Reed resigned on January 15, 2024, to become executive director of the Kentucky Office of Agricultural Policy.
