= Kentuckians for the Commonwealth =

Appalachian-American community organization

Kentuckians For The Commonwealth Logo

Kentuckians for the Commonwealth (KFTC) is a grassroots community organization under the original name of the Kentuckian Fair Tax Coalition. It began when 26 people from 12 countries met in Hazard on August 17, 1981. Though statewide, KFTC has deep roots in eastern Kentucky where coal mining remains the dominant industry. KFTC is a multi-issue organization of working-class families, with a history of working for land reform, environmental justice, and low income assistance programs. In the 1980s, KFTC was part of a campaign to end strip mining using the broad form deed and has since continued to provide support to the Appalachian region. Joe Szakos was one of the founding organizers.

== Notable accomplishments ==
The first major issue that KFTC tackled was tax reform. They wanted coal and timber companies to pay their fair taxes to support healthy communities in the Appalachian mountains.

On January 7, 1982, KFTC held their first meeting to develop a platform for an upcoming Kentucky General Assembly meeting, establishing a series of demands and support for legislation including an unmined mineral tax, an increase in the mining severance tax, and primary support for House Bill 44. In 1988, after a series of legislative efforts pushed and supported by KFTC the broad form deed laws were amended and removed in Kentucky preventing companies from mining land without land owner's permission.

In the early 1990s, KFTC members focused on protecting the community by bringing awareness to strip-mining. Surface mining can be harmful in many cases because it can erode soil, pollute waters, and harm wildlife. These issues with mining create unhealthy living conditions for the people living in this area. KFTC has advocated for the end of strip mining because it is harmful and also is only used because it is cheaper for coal companies.

In 2004, Kentuckians for the commonwealth began to focus on restoring voting rights to people who have received a felony. KFTC believes that a Democracy works better when everyone has a voice and a vote. About 1 in 11 voting age Kentuckians cannot vote due to Kentucky's voting laws. The Kentuckians for the Commonwealth organization is attempting to change this by raising awareness toward this issue.

KFTC also advocates for racial justice and creating equal opportunities for everyone in the state of Kentucky.

KFTC has continued to encourage growth towards its platform by helping establish an unmined coal tax that provides funding for local schools. They also worked with lawmakers to cut sales tax for residents below the poverty line and further develop safe mining regulation standards and mine safety provisions. KFTC is committed to supporting and encouraging a stronger and more accountable system for low-income areas that have been being taken advantage of by coal companies and corrupt policies.

== See also ==
- I Love Mountains
