= List of Murray State University alumni =

Murray State University is a public university in Murray, Kentucky. Following are some of its notable alumni.

== Art ==
Name	Class	Major	Notability	References
Jeff Easley	1977	Painting	Oil painter who creates fantasy artwork for role-playing games, comics, and magazines	
Alma Lesch	1941	Teaching	Fiber artist	
Joe Staton	1970		Comic book artist	

== Athletics ==
Name	Class	Major	Notability	References
Rex Alexander	1949		College basketball and tennis coach	
Shane Andrus	2004	Business and marketing	Professional football player with the Indianapolis Colts, Tampa Bay Buccaneers, and San Francisco 49ers	
Ivan Aska	2012	Health and physical education	Professional basketball player in the Israeli National League	
Leva Bates	2003	Theater, radio, and television	Professional wrestler with All Elite Wrestling known as The Librarian	
Marcus Brown	1996		Professional basketball player and college basketball coach	
Shaq Buchanan	2017	Integrated studies-health and exercise	Professional basketball player in the Israeli Basketball Premier League	
Todd Buchanan	1995	Physical education and psychology	Head coach of women's basketball at the University of Houston	
Chester Caddas	1957		Head football coach at the University of the Pacific and Colorado State University	
Isaiah Canaan	2013	Advertising	Professional basketball player with the Houston Rockets, Philadelphia 76ers, Chicago Bulls and Phoenix Suns	
Mike Cherry			Professional football player with the New York Giants	
Ed Daniel	2013	Healthcare administration	Professional basketball player with the Israeli team Maccabi Ashdod	
Bud Foster	1981		College football coach at Virginia Tech	
Tony Franklin	1979, 1989	History, M.A. education	Offensive coordinator and quarterback coach at Middle Tennessee State University	
Justin Fuente	1999		Head football coach at Virginia Tech, University of Memphis, and Texas Christian University	
Joe Fulks	Non-degree		Professional basketball player and inductee of the Naismith Memorial Basketball Hall of Fame	
Ron Greene	1962	Health and physical education	Head basketball coach of Mississippi State University and Murray State University	
Pete Gudauskas	1940		Professional football player with the Chicago Bears	
Rod Harper	2008	Social science	Professional football player with the New Orleans Saints and Super Bowl champion	
Rob Hart	1999	American history	Professional football player with the Tampa Bay Buccaneers, New Orleans Saints, and the Miami Dolphins	
Morgan Hicks	2004		2004 Summer Olympics in three-position smallbore shooting and head coach of Nebraska Cornhuskers rifle	
Ron Hopkins	1982		Professional football player with the Canadian Football League	
Emily Hoskins	2011	M.A., clinical psychology	2004 and 2008 U.S. Paralympian Basketball gold medalist; USOPC Hall of Fame	
Popeye Jones	1992		Professional basketball player with the Dallas Mavericks, Boston Celtics, Denver Nuggets, and Washington Wizards and assistant coach with the Denver Nuggets	
Ruth Jones		MEd physical education	Head coach for Purdue University women's basketball	
Irby Koffman			Head football coach at Murray State University	
Wesley Korir	Non-degreed		Winner of the 2012 Boston Marathon and Kenyan Member of Parliament	
Austen Lane	2009	Journalism	Professional football player with the Chicago Bears and the Jacksonville Jaguars	
Gil Mains			Professional football player with the Detroit Lions and professional wrestler	
Jeff Martin	1989		Professional basketball player	
Ja Morant	Non-degreed		Professional basketball player with the Memphis Grizzlies	
Cameron Payne	Non-degreed	Undeclared	Professional basketball player with the Phoenix Suns, Oklahoma City Thunder, Chicago Bulls, and Cleveland Cavaliers	
Pat Pitney		Engineering physics	1984 Summer Olympics gold medalist in rifle and president of the University of Alaska system	
Walt Powell	2013	Advertising	Professional football player	
Michael Proctor	1990	Safety engineering and health	Professional football player with the Canadian Football League	
Bennie Purcell	1952, 1961	B.A., M.A.	Professional basketball player with the Harlem Globetrotters and college tennis coach	
Johnny Reagan	1947		College baseball coach and minor league baseball player	
Mark Riggins			Pitching coach for Chicago Cubs and Cincinnati Reds	
Kirk Rueter	1991		Professional baseball player with the Montreal Expos and San Francisco Giants	
Heather Samuel			Sprinter at the 1992 Summer Olympics, 1996 Summer Olympics, and 2000 Summer Olympics	
James Singleton	2003		Professional basketball player	
Fred Sowerby	1973		1976 Summer Olympics track and field athlete and head track and field coach of Delaware State University	
Reggie Swinton			Professional football player with the Detroit Lions and Dallas Cowboys	
Chuck Taylor	2011		Professional wrestler	
Claude Virden			Professional basketball player	
Quincy Williams	2018	Public relations	Professional football player with the Jacksonville Jaguars	
Roger Withrow			1984 Summer Paralympics rifle gold medalist	
Jared Wolfe			Professional golfer	

== Clergy ==
Name	Class	Major	Notability	References
Brian Lee Cole	1989	Business administration	Episcopal bishop of East Tennessee	
Hartman Rector Jr.			General authority of the Church of Jesus Christ of Latter-day Saints (LDS Church)	

== Education ==
Name	Class	Major	Notability	References
Adron Doran	1938, 1948	B.A., M.A.	President of Morehead State University, director of the Division of Teacher Education and Certification for the Kentucky Department of Education, namesake of the Adron Doran University Center	
Bob Jackson	1985	Finance and economics	President of Murray State University and Kentucky Senate	
Patricia J. Johnson		Biology	Professor of Microbiology at University of California, Los Angeles	
Alison Marr	2002	Mathematics	Professor of mathematics and computer science at Southwestern University in Texas	
Pat Pitney		Engineering physics	President of the University of Alaska system and 1984 Summer Olympics gold medalist in rifle	
Forrest Pogue	1931		Director of the George C. Marshall Foundation and the Marshall Library at Virginia Military Institute; United States Army historian	
Kenneth W. Winters	1957	Industrial arts	Kentucky Senate and president of Campbellsville University	

== Entertainment ==
Name	Class	Major	Notability	References
Dee Barton			Jazz trombonist and big band drummer known with the Stan Kenton Orchestra	
W. Earl Brown	1986	Theater and radio/television	Actor	
Jerry Crutchfield	Non-degreed		Singer, songwriter, and record producer	
Tericka Dye			Former pornographic actress and teacher	
S.G. Goodman			Singer-songwriter	
Alex Harvey	1964	M.A. in music and education	Country music singer and songwriter	
Thomas Rickman	1965	English	Film director, playwright, and screenwriter	
Hal Riddle	1942		Actor	
Chrishell Stause	2003	Theater	Actress, best known for All My Children and Selling Sunset	
Chris Thile	Non-degreed	Music	Musician and member of Nickel Creek and Punch Brothers	
Jilon VanOver	2001	Theater arts	Actor	
J. D. Wilkes		Studio arts	Musician, visual artist, filmmaker	

== Law ==
Name	Class	Major	Notability	References
Bill Cunningham	1962		Justice of the Kentucky Supreme Court	
Steven H. David	1979		Justice of the Indiana Supreme Court	

== Literature and journalism ==
Name	Class	Major	Notability	References
Kevin Brown	2012	MFA poetry	Poet and author	
John Mack Carter	1948		Editor of Ladies’ Home Journal and Good Housekeeping, president and CEO of Hearst Magazines Enterprises	
Jude Deveraux	1970	Art	Historical romance novelist	
Taghreed El-Khodary	2000	M.S. mass communications	Correspondent in Gaza for The New York Times	
John Fetterman	1948		Journalist and winner of the Pulitzer Prize	
Gene Graham	1948		Journalist and co-winner of the Pulitzer Prize for National Reporting	
Mike Long		Physics and mathematics	Speechwriter and author	
Richard Thomas	2012	MFA creative writing	Author of speculative fiction	

== Military ==
Name	Class	Major	Notability	References
Mary A. Marsh	1951	Music	Brigadier general in the United States Air Force	

== Politics ==
Name	Class	Major	Notability	References
David L. Armstrong	1966		Mayor of Louisville, Kentucky	
Bill Bailey	1970		Indiana House of Representatives and mayor of Seymour, Indiana	
Joseph L. Bocchini Jr.		Education	New Jersey General Assembly	
Marion E. Burks	1935		Illinois House of Representatives and circuit court judge for Cook County, Illinois	
Myron Dossett			Kentucky House of Representatives	
Larry Elkins			Kentucky House of Representatives	
Fats Everett	1936		United States House of Representatives	
Ed Gallrein	1981 (bachelor's), 1984 (masters)	Agricultural economics	Farmer, former Navy SEAL officer, Republican Party nominee in the U.S. House of Representatives election for Kentucky's fourth congressional district in 2026	
Milton H. Hamilton Jr.	1955		Tennessee General Assembly, Tennessee Senate, and Tennessee commissioner of Environment and Conservation	
Richard Heath		Agricultural education, M.A. agriculture	Kentucky House of Representatives	
Melvin Henley	1961, 1964	Chemistry	Kentucky House of Representatives	
Larry J. Hopkins			United States House of Representatives	
Stanley H. Humphries	1992	Education	Kentucky Senate	
Kenny Imes			Kentucky House of Representatives	
Bob Jackson		Finance	Kentucky Senate and president of Murray State University	
Wesley Korir	Non-degreed		Winner of the 2012 Boston Marathon and Kenyan member of Parliament	
Adam Moore	2007	International affairs	Kentucky House of Representatives	
William F. Paxton			Mayor of Paducah, Kentucky	
Bill Redmond	1976	Political science and accounting	United States House of Representatives	
Steven Rudy	2000	Agriculture education	Kentucky House of Representatives	
Harry Lee Waterfield	1932		Lieutenant governor of Kentucky	
Gerald Watkins	1981, 1984	Business administration, MBA	Kentucky House of Representatives	
Wade Williams		MPA	Kentucky House of Representatives	
Kenneth W. Winters	1957	Industrial arts	Kentucky Senate and president of Campbellsville University	
Evan Wynn			Wisconsin State Assembly	
Brent Yonts	1971	Political science	Kentucky House of Representatives	

== Science and medicine ==
Name	Class	Major	Notability	References
Vicki Funk	1969	Biology and history	Botanist and curator at the Smithsonian's National Museum of Natural History	
Rex Geveden	1983, 1984	Engineering physics, M.S. physics	Deputy director of NASA's Marshall Space Flight Center and CEO of BWX Technologies	
J. Paul Hogan	1942	Chemistry and physics	Research chemist	
Edward G McFarland		Biology	Professor of shoulder surgery at Johns Hopkins School of Medicine	
Lois Ann Pfiester	1970	Biology	Phycologist and protistologist, specializing in freshwater dinoflagellate species	
Jerry A. Shields	1960	Biology	Ophthalmologist with the Wills Eye Institute	
Frances Strickland	1963	Health and physical education	Educational psychologist and former First Lady of Ohio	
