= Kentucky's 15th House of Representatives district =

American legislative district

Kentucky's 15th State House of Representatives district
Representative
Rebecca Raymer; R–Morgantown
since January 1, 2023
- Registration: 51.3% Republican; 41.7% Democratic; 6.5% No party preference
- Demographics: 92.3% White; 1.6% Black; 2.8% Hispanic; 0.8% Asian; 0.1% Native American; 2.5% Multiracial
- Population (2023): 43,085
- Registered voters (2025): 31,676

Kentucky's 15th House of Representatives district is one of 100 districts in the Kentucky House of Representatives. Located in the western part of the state, it comprises the counties of Butler and Muhlenberg. It has been represented by Rebecca Raymer (R–Morgantown) since 2023. As of 2023, the district had a population of 43,085.

== Voter registration ==
On January 1, 2025, the district had 31,676 registered voters, who were registered with the following parties.

Party	Registration	
Party	Voters	%
Republican	16,251	51.30
Democratic	13,214	41.72
Independent	890	2.81
Libertarian	110	0.35
Green	24	0.08
Constitution	15	0.05
Socialist Workers	3	0.01
Reform	1	0.00
"Other"	1,168	3.69
Total	31,676	100.00
Source: Kentucky State Board of Elections

== List of members representing the district ==
Member	Party	Years	Electoral history	District location
Charles Nelson (Bremen)	Democratic	January 1, 1989 – January 1, 1997	Elected in 1988. Reelected in 1990. Reelected in 1992. Reelected in 1994. Retired.	1985–1993; Muhlenberg and McLean (part) Counties.
Charles Nelson (Bremen)	Democratic	January 1, 1989 – January 1, 1997	Elected in 1988. Reelected in 1990. Reelected in 1992. Reelected in 1994. Retired.	1993–1997; Muhlenberg and McLean (part) Counties.
Brent Yonts (Greenville)	Democratic	January 1, 1997 – January 1, 2017	Elected in 1996. Reelected in 1998. Reelected in 2000. Reelected in 2002. Reelected in 2004. Reelected in 2006. Reelected in 2008. Reelected in 2010. Reelected in 2012. Reelected in 2014. Lost reelection.	1997–2003
Brent Yonts (Greenville)	Democratic	January 1, 1997 – January 1, 2017	Elected in 1996. Reelected in 1998. Reelected in 2000. Reelected in 2002. Reelected in 2004. Reelected in 2006. Reelected in 2008. Reelected in 2010. Reelected in 2012. Reelected in 2014. Lost reelection.	2003–2015
Brent Yonts (Greenville)	Democratic	January 1, 1997 – January 1, 2017	Elected in 1996. Reelected in 1998. Reelected in 2000. Reelected in 2002. Reelected in 2004. Reelected in 2006. Reelected in 2008. Reelected in 2010. Reelected in 2012. Reelected in 2014. Lost reelection.	2015–2023
Melinda Gibbons Prunty (Belton)	Republican	January 1, 2017 – January 1, 2023	Elected in 2016. Reelected in 2018. Reelected in 2020. Retired.	2015–2023
Rebecca Raymer (Morgantown)	Republican	January 1, 2023 – present	Elected in 2022. Reelected in 2024. Reelected in 2026.	2023–present
