= Abdelouahab Aissaoui =

Algerian novelist

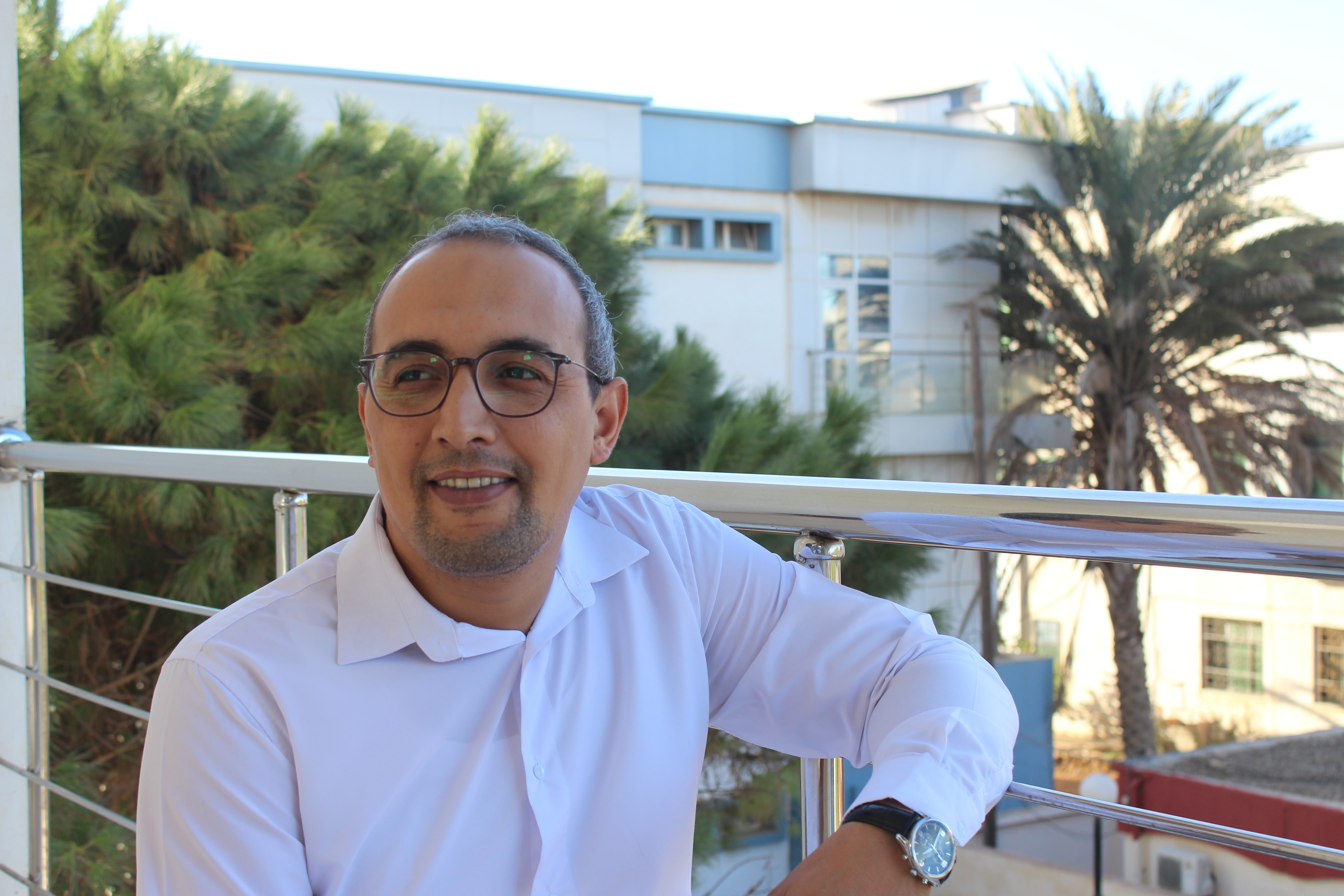
- Born: March 1985 (age 41)
- Writing career
- Notable awards: International Prize for Arabic Fiction 2020

Abdelouahab Aissaoui (born 1985) is an Algerian writer. He was born in Djelfa and studied engineering at Zayan Ashour University. He has written a series of novels, the most recent of which, The Spartan Court, won the International Prize for Arabic Fiction (IPAF) in 2020.

He was born in Djelfa, Algeria, in 1985. He studied there at the Zayan Ashour University, graduating with a degree in electromechanical engineering. He works as a maintenance engineer.

He is the first Algerian to win the IPAF. He also participated in the International Prize for Arabic Fiction Nadwa in 2016.

== Works ==
- Jacob's Cinema (Algiers: Dar Vescera, 2012; winner of 2012 President of the Republic Prize)
- Mountain of Death (Lebanon: Dar El Saqi, 2015; winner of the Assia Djebar Prize)
- Circles and Doors (Kuwait: Dar Suad Al Sabah and Algiers: Dar Mim, 2017; winner of the 2017 Kuwaiti Suad al-Sabah Novel Prize)
- Testament of the Deeds of the Forgotten Ones (Qatar: Katara, 2018; winner of the 2017 Katara Prize for Arabic Novel in the unpublished novel category)
- The Spartan Court (Algiers: Dar Mim, 2018; winner of the 2020 Arabic Booker Prize (IPAF))

The Spartan Court has been described as "polyphonic," offering "a multilayered insight into the historical occupation of Algeria, and, from this, the conflicts of the entire Mediterranean region." It is set in Algiers from 1815 to 1833. Yasir Suleiman described the book as "captivating" and "a work to celebrate," with "intertwined narratives that keep the reader glued to its enchanting characters and their tortuous fortunes."

Mountain of Death tells the story of Spanish communists imprisoned in North Africa following the Spanish civil war.
