= List of mayors of Paducah, Kentucky =

Paducah, Kentucky formed from a mixed settlement of Native Americans and White Settlers along the confluence of the Tennessee River and Ohio River. The town was incorporated in 1830 and chartered as a city in 1856. The city is governed as a council–manager form of government whereby a directly elected mayor and directly elected city commissioners. The mayor is a ceremonial title, as the City Manager is appointed to oversee daily operations of the city. The following is a list of mayors of Paducah, Kentucky from the charter date thru to the present.

== History of the office ==
The first election to take place under the Act of Incorporation took place in 1857 resulting in the first Mayor of Paducah, Jesse H. Gardner, taking the office. The office has been under direct election since its beginning and each incumbent resides in office for four (previously two) years before the next election.

== Incorporated city ==
Mayor	Term Began	Term Ended	Political Party
Jesse H. Gardner	1857	1859	
John W. Sauner	1859	1863	
John G. Fisher	1863	1867	
John W. Sauner	1867	1871	
Meyer Weil	1871	1875	
John G. Fisher	1875	1877	
Meyer Weil	1877	1881	
Charles Reed	1881	1889	
Joseph H. Johnson	1889	1891	
David A. Yeiser Sr.	1891	1897	
James M. Lang	1897	1901	Democrat
David A. Yeiser Sr.	1902	1907	
James P. Smith	1908	1911	Republican
Thomas N. Hazelip	1912	1915	Republican
Ernest Lackey	1916	1916	Democrat
Frank N. Burns	1916	1919	Democrat
F. W. Katterjohn	1920	1924	Democrat
Jacob N. Bailey	1924	1928	Democrat
Ernest Lackey	1928	1932	Democrat
Edward G. Scott	1932	1936	Democrat
Edgar T. Washburn	1936	1940	Democrat
Pierce E. Lackey	1940	1944	Democrat
Wayne C. Seaton	1944	1948	Democrat
Gene Peak	1948	1949	Democrat
Stuart Johnston	1949	1952	Democrat
Robert C. Cherry	1952	1956	Democrat
George G. Jacobs	1956	1960	Democrat
Robert C. Cherry	1960	1964	Republican
Thomas W. Wilson	1964	1968	Republican
Robert C. Cherry	1968	1972	Democrat
Dolly McNutt	1972	1976	Democrat
William S. Murphy	1976	1980	Democrat
John K. Penrod	1980	1984	Democrat
Joe Viterisi	1984	1988	Republican
Gerry B. Montgomery	1988	1996	Republican
J. Albert Jones	1996	2000	Democrat
William F. Paxton	2000	2012	Democrat
Gayle Kaler	2012	2016	Republican
Brandi Harless	2016	2020	Democrat
George Bray	2020		Republican
