= Media coverage of the Gaza War (2008–2009) =

Media played an important part of the 2008–2009 Israel–Gaza conflict. Foreign press access to Gaza has been limited since November 2008 via either Egypt or Israel. On 29 December 2008, the Israeli Supreme Court ordered that journalists be allowed into Gaza whenever the crossings were opened, but the IDF refused to comply. There have been arrests of journalists due to violations of wartime censorship in Israel, and these have been denounced by international press organizations. Media infrastructure, including Al-Aqsa TV transmission equipment and foreign and local press offices, were hit during the conflict. Media relations also played an important role, with the use of new media on the part of Israel, as well as a clear public relations campaign.

== Background ==
Following Israel withdrawal from Gaza there were number of cases of violence targeted at foreign journalists claimed by previously unknown groups sometimes linked to Al Qaeda. The most notable case is kidnapping of BBC journalist, Alan Johnston. Palestinian security sources urged all foreigners (especially Europeans and Americans), including aid workers of international organizations, to leave Gaza soil "for fears of new kidnappings". Hamas is known to take part in negotiation and release of hostages in many cases. Subsequently, the Foreign Press Association issued a statement saying Gaza had become a "no-go zone". International organisations instead relied on their local staff to gather information.

== Foreign press in Gaza ==
Israel and Egypt, the only two countries sharing borders with Gaza, have refused access to Gaza by foreign journalists since November 2008. The Israeli Supreme Court ruled on 29 December that journalists must be allowed access to Gaza at times when the main border crossing is open, but the military has not complied. A spokesman for the Israeli embassy in the United Kingdom said that Israel was restricting entry into Gaza because Gaza is a war zone, and that other countries would do the same.

Various press associations and organizations have called this ban as "unprecedented", and the Foreign Press Association (FPA) of Israel called the ban a "violation of press freedom" as practiced by other regimes. The International Federation of Journalists said that the ban on foreign media entering Gaza, combined with the Military Censor's now following strict guidelines issued by the head censorship office in Israel, meant that the world was not being allowed to see what is happening in Gaza. As of January 2009, Al Jazeera, whose reporters Ayman Mohyeldin and Sherine Tadros were already inside Gaza when the conflict began, is the only international broadcaster with a journalist reporting from inside Gaza. The BBC has a local producer Rushdi Abu Alouf within Gaza.

The New York Times reported on 10 January that "Israel has also managed to block cellphone bandwidth, so very few amateur cellphone photographs are getting out of Gaza."

On 18 January, journalists entered Gaza via the Erez crossing after a ceasefire was declared.

Hamas officials stopped the BBC from filming at one site, possibly because there was a military target nearby.

== Hits by IDF ==
Media facilities in Gaza, both foreign and domestic, have come under Israeli fire since the military campaign began. On 29 December, the IDF destroyed the facilities and headquarters of Al-Aqsa TV (though broadcasts continue from elsewhere), and on 5 January, the IDF bombed the offices of the Hamas-affiliated Al-Risala newsweekly. On 9 January, the IDF hit the Johara tower of Gaza City, which houses more than 20 international news organizations, including Turkish, French, and Iranian outlets. Haaretz publish video tape of Gaza reporter confirming Hamas fired rockets near TV offices. Gaza reporter Hanan Al-Masri from Johara tower on Al-Arabiya: "A Grad rocket from here? It's here. Listen, it's here, below the building...". Al-Jazeera reported that at least one journalist was injured in the attack and Press TV reported that satellite transmission equipment was damaged. An IDF Spokesperson's Unit said the building had not been targeted, though it may have sustained collateral damage.

== Media restrictions ==
Two Arab journalists from East Jerusalem working for an Iranian TV station were arrested by Israeli authorities on 12 January, and charged with violating IDF censorship protocols for allegedly reporting on the IDF ground offensive into Gaza hours before they were given permission. The journalists denied the charges, maintaining that they merely reported what was being said in the international media. One Italian journalist, after obtaining clearance from the IDF to travel to Netzarim, was fired on at an Israeli checkpoint even after renewed telephonic contact with the military authorities about the incident led to assurances he could proceed safely.

Government Press Office chief Daniel Seaman on 25 January denied that Israeli government policy banned foreign reporters from Gaza from 8 November 2008 through 21 January 2009, and denigrated the media as "crybabies...unwilling to make effort" to get to Gaza, and asserted that all but 3 percent act as "a figleaf for Hamas". The Foreign Press Association had petitioned Israel's High Court to get unfettered access to the Gaza strip. Press restriction appears to have been part of the propaganda campaign of Operation Cast Lead

Nachman Shai, a former Israeli army spokesman, claimed that Israel's tight regulation of the media was a reaction to "confusing" reporting during the 2006 Israel-Lebanon conflict. The Foreign Press Association of Israel released a statement saying, "The unprecedented denial of access to Gaza for the world’s media amounts to a severe violation of press freedom and puts the state of Israel in the company of a handful of regimes around the world which regularly keep journalists from doing their jobs".

== Media campaigns ==
Haaretz reported that Israeli Foreign Minister Tzipi Livni "instructed senior ministry officials to open an aggressive and diplomatic international public relations campaign in order to gain support for Israel Defense Forces operations in the Gaza Strip." Israeli officials at embassies and consulates worldwide have mounted campaigns in local media, and to that end have recruited people who speak the native language. Israel has also opened an international media centre in Sderot. Deputy Israel's consulate in New York City began holding online press conferences on Twitter, a microblogging website.

Israeli Deputy Foreign Minister Majallie Whbee has criticised some of the international media for not showing the Israeli perspective, saying that some outlets "have often failed to report on the pervasive Kassam attacks that preceded the [current] violence", according to the Jerusalem Post.

There has been a YouTube channel opened by IDF Spokesperson's Unit, with many combat videos and a narrative video log. The videos are intended to bolster Israel's positions on contentious issues. The accuracy of one of the videos has been disputed B'Tselem and Human Rights Watch who claimed that a purported Israeli strike on militants, in fact, killed several civilians. Hamas has also launched a YouTube-like video site broadcasting criticism of Fatah and videos of Hamas attacks and Israeli casualty numbers.

== Media bias accusations ==
=== Israeli media ===
Israel's media has been criticized for practicing alleged self-censorship and muzzling dissent with coverage on the conflict that has been described as overtly patriotic and biased against Hamas. Eight Israeli human rights groups wrote a letter to newspaper editors, broadcasters and websites claiming, "opinions criticising the decision to launch the offensive or the army's conduct during the war are hardly heard." Critics pointed to newspaper headlines describing the surprise airstrikes against Gaza, including the Yedioth Ahronoth headline "Better Late Than Never" and the Maariv headline "Fighting Back." Keshev, an Israeli media watchdog group, said Israeli television channels dispatched their anchors to towns hit by Hamas rockets, but provided little attention to reports of the devastation inside Gaza. As an example, Yizhar Be'er, head of Keshev, cited the relatively little Israeli coverage afforded to the deaths of almost 50 people on 6 January airstrikes on three United Nations schools, which Israeli forces mistakenly believed were used as militant hide-outs. Regarding the overall coverage, Be'er said:

"The media's coverage of the first days of the fighting was characterised by feelings of self-righteousness and a sense of catharsis following what was felt to be undue restraint in the face of attacks by the enemy, along with support for the military action and few expressions of criticism."

A Channel 10 senior editor acknowledged a large amount of patriotism in coverage of the conflict, but attributed it largely to Israel's refusal to allow journalists into Hamas and the army's restrictions over information coming from the battlefield. He told Agence France-Presse, "There are no means to develop criticism because we receive very few details from the army on the fighting inside Gaza. ... When there is no criticism there is more room for patriotism."

=== United Kingdom ===
The BBC received accusations of bias, both for and against Israel, during the conflict, but received particularly intense criticism for its decision not to broadcast a television appeal by aid agencies for victims of the airstrikes against Gaza. BBC officials said the decision stemmed from a policy of maintaining impartiality in the dispute. But many parties criticized the decision, including both Church of England archbishops, British government ministers and even some BBC employees. BBC officials described the criticism as unprecedented, including more than 11,000 complaints in a three-day span. Some protests have accused the company of giving in to pressure from Israel or Jewish groups, while others attribute it to a fear of controversy in light of prior embarrassments over Middle East coverage; the BBC has strongly denied both claims.

Arab Media Watch, a London-based watchdog, with the stated aim of striving for objective coverage of Arab issues in the British media, said it had found pro-Israel bias in the British press. According to their study, when the British press represents one party as retaliating, the party is Israel more than three-quarters of the time; in the tabloid press, Israel is portrayed as the retaliating party 100 percent of the time. Violent actions by Israel were portrayed as "retaliations" three times more often than they were portrayed as "provocations." An Arab Media Watch advisor said "inevitably, these trends in reporting leave Palestinian violence largely unexplained, causing it to appear as unwarranted 'aggression.'"

=== New York Times ===
Taghreed El-Khodary, a correspondent for The New York Times, was among the few correspondents reporting from Gaza during the 2008–2009 Israel–Gaza conflict after Israel prevented correspondents from crossing the Gaza–Israel border. El-Khodary describes herself as among the "very few objective reporters" covering the conflict. She was praised for the "in-depth, balanced coverage" of the conflict.

El-Khodary, who covered the conflict from a position near the Al-Shifa Hospital, was criticized for failing to cover Hamas's use of homes, mosques, hospitals and schools for weapons storage, not reporting on Hamas's use of human shields, not reporting on Hamas's use of children as to assist soldiers, not reporting on Hamas's wartime execution of accused "collaborators," and not reporting on the location of the Hamas leadership in a bunker beneath the Shifa Hospital. The Times was accused of failing to balance reports by a journalist whose "personal perspective" placed blame for the conflict on Israel alone. As El-Khodary put it in a CNN interview, "The real issue" in the 2008–2009 Israel–Gaza conflict is "The Israeli military occupation." And of publishing a distorted picture of, as El-Khodary expressed it, a situation in which "ordinary people are squeezed between suicidal fighters and a military behemoth," and of covering civilian casualties in Gaza "to the virtual exclusion of any other issues."

== Hacktivism ==
The conflict also engendered considerable propaganda, hacktivism and cyber warfare (both on the part of the combatants and polities directly involved and of independent, private parties) which resulted in numerous website defacements, denial-of-service attacks and domain name and account hijackings. An opt-in anti-Hamas botnet created by Israeli students appeared, and new media diplomacy appeared on social networking sites such as Facebook and Second Life, and on new media such as Twitter.

== See also ==
- Media coverage of the Arab–Israeli conflict
