= Tuvia Grossman =

American-Israeli man misidentified as a Palestinian in a 2000 Associated Press article

The photograph's caption as it appeared in The New York Times during the Second Intifada, misidentifying Grossman as a Palestinian and the location in the background as the Temple Mount. In reality, the photograph had been taken at a gas station near Wadi al-Joz, where Grossman was attacked by a Palestinian mob after his taxi driver attempted to take a shortcut through their neighbourhood.

Tuvia Grossman (Hebrew: טוביה גרוסמן) is an Israeli-American man who was erroneously identified as a Palestinian in the caption of a photograph that was published by the Associated Press (AP) during the Second Intifada. Taken on the eve of Rosh Hashanah in September 2000, the photograph shows an officer of the Israel Border Police defending Grossman at a gas station after the latter was surrounded, stabbed, and beaten by a Palestinian mob when his taxi driver attempted to take a shortcut through a Palestinian neighbourhood in Jerusalem. However, the AP's caption identified Grossman as a Palestinian man at the Temple Mount, giving the impression that he had been brutalized by the Israeli police officer. It was marketed widely by the AP and featured in several Arab media and government outlets, in addition to mainstream American newspapers like The New York Times and The Wall Street Journal.

Following the publishing, Grossman's father contacted The New York Times to correct his son's identity and reveal the true context of incident that was occurring when the photograph was taken. An article was then published by the newspaper to explain that Grossman was actually a Jewish student, that the photograph was not taken at the Temple Mount, and that the Israeli police officer—later identified as Gidon Tzefadi (Arabic: جدعون تزيفادي), a Druze from Kisra-Sumei—was ordering the attacking Palestinian mob to stay back.

The AP publishing of Grossman's photograph highlights one of many contentious media incidents in the Israeli–Palestinian conflict. It received severe backlash from a number of pro-Israel watchdogs and advocacy organizations.

== Second Intifada incident ==
On the eve of Rosh Hashana in September 2000, Grossman, a Jewish student from Chicago who was enrolled at Yeshivas Bais Yisroel in the Israeli settlement of Neve Yaakov (a neighborhood of Jerusalem), hailed a taxi with two friends to visit the Western Wall. When the driver took a shortcut through the East Jerusalem Palestinian neighborhood of Wadi al-Joz, a mob of about 40 Palestinian Arabs surrounded the taxi, smashed the windows, and dragged Grossman out, whereupon they beat him. The mob kicked him repeatedly, stabbed him once in the leg, and then pounded his head with rocks. Grossman managed to run to a nearby gas station where he collapsed, and an Israeli policeman, wielding a club, protected him and threatened the mob. The photograph was taken at that time by a freelance photographer who was at the gas station; in the photo, Grossman is shown bleeding and crouched under the policeman who is shouting and waving his club.

=== News coverage ===
At the outset of the Second Intifada on 30 September 2000, the New York Times and other media outlets published an AP photo of a bloodied Grossman crouching beneath a club-wielding Israeli Border Police officer. The caption under the photo simply identified the two as an "Israeli policeman and a Palestinian".

==== Corrections ====
The victim's true identity was revealed when Dr. Aaron Grossman of Chicago, the father of Tuvia Grossman, sent the following letter to the New York Times:

Regarding your picture on page A5 of the Israeli soldier and the Palestinian on the Temple Mount -- that Palestinian is actually my son, Tuvia Grossman, a Jewish student from Chicago. He, and two of his friends, were pulled from their taxicab while traveling in Jerusalem, by a mob of Palestinian Arabs, and were severely beaten and stabbed. That picture could not have been taken on the Temple Mount because there are no gas stations on the Temple Mount and certainly none with Hebrew lettering, like the one clearly seen behind the Israeli soldier attempting to protect my son from the mob.

In response, the New York Times published a correction on 4 October 2000, stating the following:

A picture caption on Saturday about fighting between Israelis and Palestinians in Jerusalem included an erroneous identification from The Associated Press for a wounded man shown with an Israeli policeman. He was Tuvia Grossman of Chicago, an American student in Israel, not an unidentified Palestinian. In some copies the caption also misidentified the site where Mr. Grossman was wounded. It was in Jerusalem's Old City, but not on the Temple Mount.

In this correction, Tuvia Grossman is accurately identified as "an American student in Israel," but it is not noted that he is Jewish and his beating is not described. The location is still misstated, this time as Jerusalem's Old City, while the true location was the Palestinian Arab neighborhood of Wadi al-Joz.

Three days later, on 7 October 2000, the Times published another correction:

A picture caption on Page A6 last Saturday about fighting in Jerusalem gave an erroneous identification from The Associated Press for a wounded man shown with an Israeli policeman. He was Tuvia Grossman of Chicago, an American studying at a Jewish seminary in Jerusalem, not an unidentified Palestinian. In some copies the caption also included the news agency's erroneous reference to the site. The incident occurred in an Arab neighborhood of Jerusalem, not on the Temple Mount or elsewhere in the Old City. A correction in this space on Wednesday cited the errors incompletely and omitted an explanation of the scene. The officer was waving a nightstick at Palestinians, telling them to stay away from Mr. Grossman. He was not beating Mr. Grossman.

This note was accurate, and accompanied by an article which described the beating:

They looked out, as they recalled later, and saw a crowd of Palestinian youths blocking the road and closing in on them. A stone crashed through the back window and Mr. Pollock's head was gashed. Then all of the taxi's windows were shattered in a volley of rocks, and the terrified Americans tried to huddle down and cover their faces. The doors were jerked open, they said, and they were dragged out by the mob and beaten.

The article further noted the following:

The officer [shown above Grossman in picture], wielding a club and moving toward him protectively, ordered the Palestinians to back off.

"He recognized that Tuvia was Jewish and was being pursued, and he was yelling, 'Back off! Back off!'" Mr. Grossman's aunt, Shelley Winkler, of Far Rockaway, Queens, said yesterday, having learned what happened from Mr. Grossman's parents, Dr. Aaron and Tzirel Grossman, who went to Israel early in the week

==== Usage in Arab media and government outlets ====
Several organizations have used Grossman's picture, falsely presenting him as a Palestinian. One of them was an Egyptian government website, along with a number of other Arab sites.

This same picture has been used to cause anger toward Coca-Cola by falsely identifying Grossman as a Palestinian.

=== Aftermath ===
In April 2002, a District Court in Paris ordered the French daily newspaper Libération and the Associated Press to pay 4,500 Euros to Grossman in damages for misrepresenting him.

Seth Ackerman of FAIR, a progressive left-leaning media watchdog, posited that the response of pro-Israel media critics was excessive, as "no one alleged any deliberate falsification" by AP, adding that "the vast majority of injuries in Jerusalem the day the Grossman photograph was taken were sustained by Palestinians".

According to Ackerman, seven to eight U.S. newspapers picked up the photo along with the original erroneous caption. The Associated Press acknowledged the error and set about correcting it, along with almost all of the newspapers that printed the photograph. The New York Times published two retractions (one on 4 October 2000 and another three days later) as well as a 670-word news article tracing the incident from the time the photograph was taken to when it was published.

"Newspapers across the country carried angry commentaries and letters by supporters of Israel brandishing the mislabeled photograph as palpable proof of their long-held suspicions. The New York Post (10/5/00) and Wall Street Journal (10/6/00) each ran op-eds on the photo. In commentaries, the mislabeled photo was proof that pro-Palestinian "misreporting by the media has been rampant" (Albany Times-Union, 10/25/00), and that "Anti-Israel Bias Warps American Minds" (Providence Journal-Bulletin, 10/13/00). Daily Oklahoman columnist Edie Roodman (10/13/00) accused the media of "'indirectly stimulating riots' by Palestinians." – Seth Ackerman, FAIR

== Later life ==
In September 2005, Tuvia Grossman made aliyah (immigrated to Israel): "I knew that I wanted to be here, in Israel," Grossman said as he prepared to leave his hometown of Chicago for his flight. "Nothing was going to stop me." Grossman had studied law in his native Chicago. After immigrating to Israel, he did an internship at the Israeli Supreme Court, passed the Israeli bar, and became a lawyer. Grossman worked for a time as an energy and infrastructure lawyer at both Gornitzky & Co. and Epstein Rosenblum Maoz (ERM) in Tel Aviv. As of 2025, he is the Chief Legal Officer at Pangea.

=== Identity of the police officer ===
In 2010, ten years after the incident, Tuvia Grossman finally met the police officer who saved his life, learning that his name was Gidon Tzefadi. Tzefadi is an Israeli Druze and former Chief Superintendent of the Israeli East Jerusalem Border Police. The event was documented on the website HonestReporting.

== See also ==
- Media coverage of the Israeli–Palestinian conflict § Photo of Tuvia Grossman
