= Brent Housman =

American politician

Member of the Kentucky House of Representatives from the 3rd district
- In office January 1, 2009 – January 1, 2013
- Preceded by: Frank Rasche
- Succeeded by: Gerald Watkins

Personal details
- Born: June 10, 1973 (age 53)
- Party: Republican

David Brent Housman (born June 10, 1973) is an American politician from Kentucky who was a member of the Kentucky House of Representatives from 2009 to 2013. Housman was first elected in 2008 after incumbent representative Frank Rasche resigned from the house in order to become the legislative liaison for the state Department of Education. Housman retired from the house in 2012.
