= J. Albert Jones =

American lawyer and politician (1929–2021)

Mayor of Paducah
- In office January 1, 1996 – January 1, 2001
- Preceded by: Gerry Montgomery
- Succeeded by: William F. Paxton

Member of the Kentucky House of Representatives from the 3rd district
- In office January 1, 1987 – January 1, 1993
- Preceded by: Dolly McNutt
- Succeeded by: Frank Rasche

United States Attorney for the Western District of Kentucky
- In office August 5, 1977 – May 31, 1980
- President: Jimmy Carter
- Preceded by: George J. Long Jr.
- Succeeded by: Jack Smith (acting)

Commonwealth's Attorney of the 2nd Kentucky Circuit Court
- In office January 6, 1964 – August 2, 1977
- Preceded by: James E. Moore
- Succeeded by: Mark Bryant

Personal details
- Born: November 11, 1929
- Died: February 10, 2021 (aged 91)
- Party: Democratic

James Albert Jones (November 11, 1929 – February 10, 2021) was an American lawyer and politician from Kentucky who was a member of the Kentucky House of Representatives from 1987 to 1993. He previously served as the United States Attorney for the Western District of Kentucky from 1977 to 1981, and as the Commonwealth's Attorney of the 2nd Kentucky Circuit Court from 1964 to 1977.

Jones was first elected Commonwealth's Attorney in 1963, defeating incumbent James E. Moore in the Democratic primary election. He won reelection in 1969 and 1975, and served until 1977 when he was appointed by president Jimmy Carter as US Attorney. His nomination was confirmed by the Senate on July 27 of that year, and he resigned as Commonwealth's Attorney effective August 2. He was sworn in as US Attorney on August 5. He resigned on May 31, 1980.

Jones was first elected to the house in 1986 when incumbent representative Dolly McNutt retired. He did not seek reelection in 1992.

He died in February 2021 at age 91.
