= Dar Mim =

Dar Mim (est. 2007) is a publishing house for Arabic literature based in Algiers, Algeria. Many of the works it has published have gone on to receive international critical acclaim.

Dar Mim was founded in 2007 by Assia Ali Moussa. In addition to novels, it publishes poetry, theatre, and literary and philosophical criticism and research. Some novels published by Dar Mim have gone on to win and be nominated for international literary awards.

It primarily focuses on works by young Algerian Arabophone authors such as Djamila Morani, Ismail Yabrir, Malika Rafa, Samia Ben Dris, Saliha Laradji, Sofiane Mokhenache, and Abdelouahab Aissaoui.

== Selected works ==
Dar Mim publishes in Arabic.

- Lā yatrak fī mutanāwal alatfāl ("Keep it Beyond the Reach of Children," novel) by Sofiane Mokhenache (2012)
- Mukhāḍ al-sulḥafā ("Tortoise Birth," novel) by Sofiane Mokhenache (2016)
- Tāj al-khaṭīʾa ("Crown's Sin") by Djamila Morani (2017)
- Al-duwāʾir wa al-ʾabwāb ("The Circles and Doors," novel) by Abdelouahab Aissaou (2017)
- Al-dīwān al-ʾasbartʾ ("The Spartan Court, novel) by Abdelouahab Aissaou (2017; winner of the 2020 Arabic Booker Prize (IPAF))
- ānā wa ḥāyīm ("Me and Haim," novel) by Habib Sayah (longlisted for the IPAF in 2019)
- ʿAin ḥamūrābi ("The Eye of Hammurabi," novel) by Abdulatif Ould Abdullah (2020; shortlisted for the 2021 IPAF)
