= Media coverage of the 2014 Gaza War =

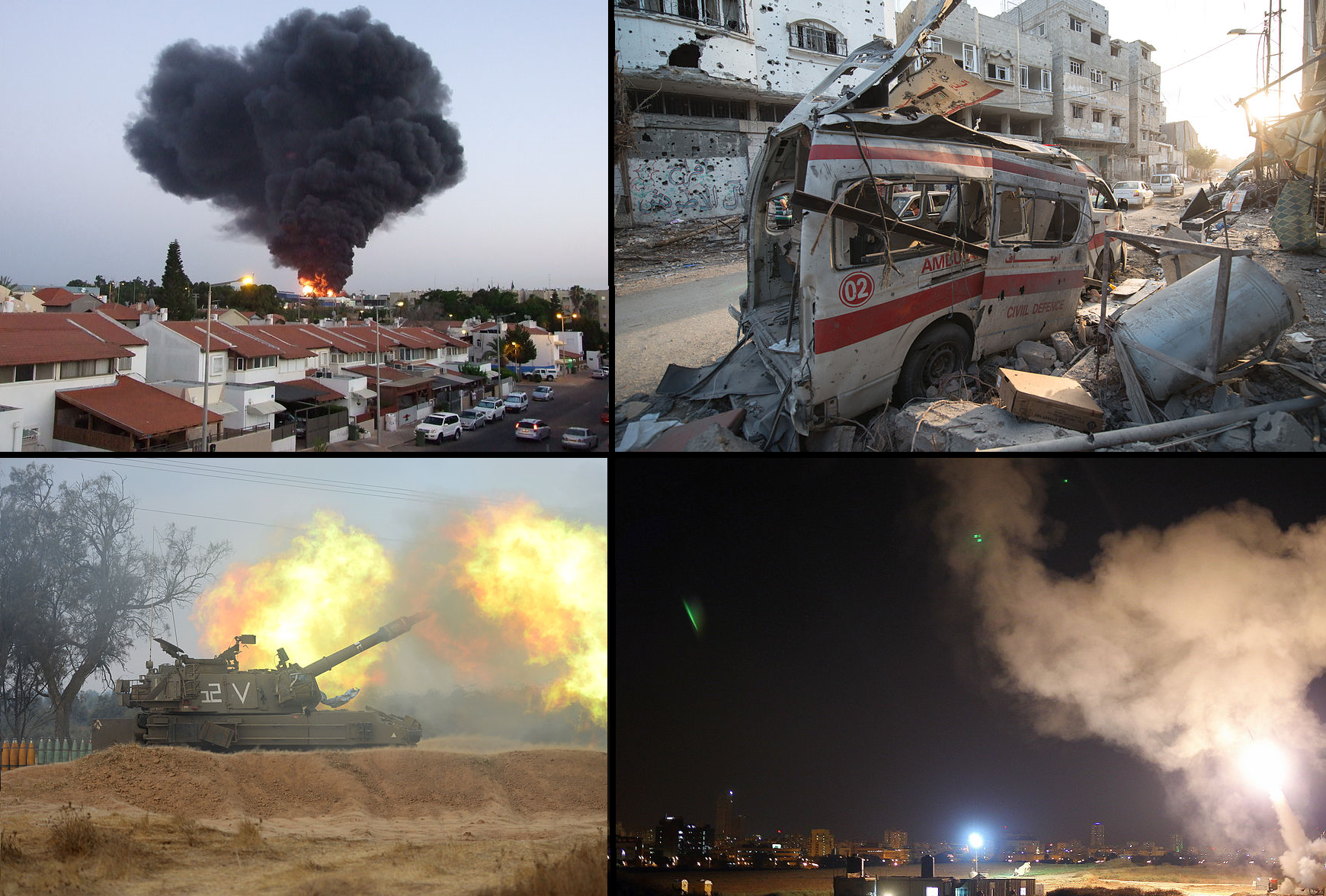
Collage of the 2014 Israeli-Gaza conflict

Media coverage of the 2014 Gaza War were varied depending on the media source. In the English-speaking world, U.S. news sources were often more sympathetic to Israel, while British news sources were more critical of Israel. Commentators on both sides have claimed that the media is biased either for or against Israel. According to The Times of Israel, British sources were more often critical of Israel. As the conflict progressed and Palestinian deaths increased, media became somewhat more critical of Israel.

Within Israel, the newspaper Haaretz issued an editorial that the "soft Gaza sand ... could turn into quicksand" for the Israeli military and warning about the "wholesale killing" of Palestinian civilians. The article declared, "There can be no victory here." Naturally there was a lot of coverage in the Israeli media.

In Egypt, Hamas received criticism from TV hosts.

== Operation names ==
- The Israeli media the operation called "מבצע צוק איתן" meaning "Strong Cliff".
- Israel chose to use "Operation Protective Edge" in English. Most media around the world didn't distinguish between the operation against Hamas and the Israel–Gaza conflict.
- Hamas's media called the operation "العصف المأكول". The last sentence from Surat Al-Fil, "and He made them like eaten straw".
- PIJ called it "البنيان المرصوص", also from the Quran, Surat 61.4, "Verily, God loves those who fight in His cause in rows as if they were a solid structure"

== Threats against reporters ==
Hamas allegedly threatened reporters in Gaza and deterred them from reporting news that was critical of Hamas. This is allegedly why many news updates were released only after the TV teams left Gaza strip. NDTV published news that Hamas had fired from civilian areas. The reporter Gallagher Fenwick from FRANCE 24, used exclusive footage of a Hamas rocket to prove the militant group has been firing from populated areas.

Israel's Channel 10 was hacked by Hamas with a message "Prepare for a drawn-out stay in bomb shelters", showing pictures of wounded civilians in Gaza. Thousands of editors requested on Yonit Levi's Facebook page that she should be fired after she reported on, the deaths and casualties in Gaza, on Israel's Channel 2 Prime Time News. Many threats were so abusive that police had to conduct an investigation of them. In the Knesset Yariv Levin called for Gideon Levy, who had been the subject of numerous death threats, which required him to be protected by bodyguards, to be indicted for treason because his articles displayed empathy with Palestinians and were vocal in opposing the war. Eldad Yaniv on Facebook wrote "The late Gideon Levy: get used to it." Friends recommended that he should leave the country for his own safety. Israeli-Arab Knesset member Haneen Zoabi controversially said that those who had murdered the three kidnapped Israeli teenagers were not terrorists but responding to the ongoing Israeli occupation of the West Bank. Later she also became the victim of a death threat campaign and was confined to her home on security grounds.

== Criticism of coverage ==
=== Purported pro-Israel bias ===
In The Guardian, Owen Jones called the BBC's headline "Israel under renewed Hamas attack" [as] "perverse as Mike Tyson punching a toddler, followed by a headline claiming that the child spat at him", and that "the macabre truth is that Israeli life is deemed by the Western media to be worth more than a Palestinian life."

In London, Newcastle, Manchester, Liverpool and Glasgow, protesting demonstrators accused the BBC of "pro-Israeli bias" in its coverage of the ongoing conflict. It claimed that news coverage was "entirely devoid of context or background". An open letter to BBC director signed by 45,000 people including Noam Chomsky, John Pilger, Ken Loach, Brian Eno and Jeremy Hardy said it would "like to remind the BBC that Gaza is under Israeli occupation and siege [and] that Israel is bombing a refugee population". (Israel ended its occupation of Gaza in September 2005.) The BBC has defended its coverage.

Building on research by the Glasgow University Media Group that examined the media coverage of recent Israeli attacks on Lebanon and Gaza, Greg Philo, research director of the university's media unit, described how senior BBC journalists have spoken to him about being unable to get the Palestinian viewpoint across. The organization, through a spokesperson, has said in response to criticism, "We cover stories based on how newsworthy they are, and what else is happening."

ABC News received criticism when Diane Sawyer misidentified photos of rubble in Gaza as being in Israel. Sawyer later apologized on-air for the error.

British politician George Galloway said that "300 Palestinians are completely ignored by the same newspapers, by the same television stations and by the same political leaders who are threatening sanctions and war against Russia.... Why the double standard? Why is the blood in Ukraine so much more noteworthy than the blood in Gaza?"

NBC News was criticized for ordering its correspondent Ayman Mohyeldin out of Gaza after witnessing the killing of four Palestinian children. He was later reinstated. NBC News stated that their deployments are constantly reassessed, but did not officially give a reason for his removal or reinstatement.

=== Purported anti-Israel bias ===
CAMERA, a pro-Israel media advocacy and lobbying body and its affiliates (including BBC Watch), criticized British and American news outlets, including The New York Times, CNN, The Guardian, Associated Press, The Washington Post, and the BBC, for an anti-Israel bias. It alleged factual errors, omissions, biased wording and anti-Semitism that led to Israel being portrayed in what it construed as an overly-negative light.

Investigative reporter Judith Miller criticized US media, and her former employer The New York Times in particular, for being unsympathetic to Israel and downplaying the context of the kidnapping and murder of Israeli teenagers.

Diplomat Dore Gold and his Jerusalem Center for Public Affairs think tank have been highly critical of international media coverage of the conflict, saying "The real truth about what transpired during the war was superseded by a highly subjective presentation that suited the Hamas interest, and which it skillfully sold to international opinion-makers."

In June 2015 the Israeli Foreign Ministry released a controversial cartoon video that mocked international media coverage of the conflict, claiming it was heavily biased against Israel. The Foreign Press Association in Jerusalem released a statement officially rebuking the video.

== Social media ==
The ubiquity of social media in this conflict has in its immediacy changed how people understand war, given how it short circuits the traditional editorial process. There are more journalists on the ground than during the 2009 conflict, and what once could have been a remark made to a friend in bar can now be sent out on Twitter.

In the eight days leading up to Operation Protective Edge, the social media site Twitter hashtag #GazaUnderAttack was used over 375,000 times. Often the hashtag was used on tweets using photos that claimed to show how people were suffering due to Israeli attacks. A BBC study showed that in some cases these photos were from previous Israeli attacks, or from wars in Syria and Iraq, with some images being recycled from as long ago as 2007.

A false report was circulated on social media and via SMS that a rocket from Gaza had hit a petrochemical plant in Haifa. These reports cited Haaretz as their source but turned out to be false. Haaretz denied issuing such warnings.

A photograph published by Danish journalist Allan Sørensen on Twitter caused uproar online, gathering more than 8,500 retweets. It showed Israelis in Sderot gathered on top of a hill to celebrate and cheer as they watched Israeli airstrikes on Gaza. People reportedly brought chairs, sofas, popcorn, and hookahs with them. The scene was described as "something resembling a party". Similarly, according to The Jerusalem Post, Palestinians in Hebron cheered as Gazan rockets were fired at Tel Aviv. People reportedly stood at rooftops chanting "Allahu Akbar!" ["God is greatest!"] at the sight. When four Palestinian children were killed by Israeli fire while playing on a beach in Gaza, the Israeli newssite Walla!'s talkback received comments ranging from "There isn't a more beautiful picture than those of dead Arab children," and "Really, these are great pictures. They make me so happy, I want to look at them again and again," to "As many children as possible should die."

After 13 soldiers were killed in Gaza on 20 July, many families found out about their family member's death via WhatsApp hours before officially being told by the IDF, which eventually led to the arrest of three soldiers for leaking the news.

Many foreign journalists inside Gaza have Tweeted that they were witnessing Hamas using human shields by launching rockets from within civilian areas including hospitals and the hotels the journalists were staying, as well as Hamas members allegedly dressing up as civilians while hiding weapons. Pro-Palestinian Tweeters responded by making threats and calling the journalists Israeli spies.

=== YouTube ===
Shock Israel's Security is a propaganda song produced by Izz ad-Din al-Qassam Brigades in 2012, advocating shocking the security of Israel by terrorist attacks. It removed from YouTube because it violated its policy prohibiting hate speech.

On 16 July, reserve soldiers resented Netanyahu for not letting them into Gaza after nine days on the border, having left their wives and work. Mordechai Yitzhar of Battalion 630 uploaded to YouTube, a song with the Hebrew title "The Protective Edge Anthem". It reported that soldiers are worried that they have abandoned their private lives in vain if Israel gives up the ground incursion into the Gaza Strip. During the last week of the operation, many citizens, in a parody of the Ice Bucket Challenge uploaded to YouTube under the hashtag "RubbleBucketChallenge" or "GazaBucketChallenge". Instead of emptying a bucket of iced water over their heads, participants used a bucket of dust and rubble to raise awareness of the situation in Gaza.

Ethnix's song, "Tomorrow I will return home" (מחר אני בבית), became one of the most famous songs after operations. It was sung by the band to Israeli soldiers in the middle of the ground offensive.

== Advert ban ==
The Israel Broadcasting Authority banned a 1-minute, 25-second radio advert, produced by the Israeli human rights' group B'Tselem, which listed the names and ages of some Palestinian children killed in the conflict in Hebrew; the grounds given were that the advert was "politically controversial". B'Tselem appealed the decision, which it said was a "far-reaching statement" that amounted to censorship, and the organization asked: "Is it controversial that the children [aren't] alive? That they're children? That those are their names? These are facts that we wish to bring to the public's knowledge." Their appeal was declined. They announced that they would petition the Supreme Court of Israel.

== Publication of antisemitic material ==
The Sydney Morning Herald apologized for running an antisemitic cartoon after Australian Attorney-General George Brandis denounced it as "deplorable".

== Questions on civilian deaths ==
The BBC reviewing the UN High Commissioner for Human Rights figures, stated the 725 civilian men killed outnumbered the 214 women by 3.5 to 1. Additionally 216 confirmed Hamas members makes the disparity larger.

The New York Times presented statistics questioning that 72% were civilians. They stated that men ages 20–29, the most common for Hamas militants, made up 34% of the death toll despite making up 9% of the Gaza population. Additionally women and children made up just 33% of the deaths, despite making up 71% of the population.

== Hamas claims during the fighting ==
During the fighting media sources affiliated with Hamas were reported as claiming to have killed a large number of Israeli soldiers; taken soldiers captive; shot down an F16 plane, destroyed at least two Merkava tanks and flying UAVs over Tel Aviv and taking pictures of the IDF HQ.

== See also ==
- Media coverage of the Arab–Israeli conflict
