= Adron Doran =

American politician

79th Speaker of the Kentucky House of Representatives
- In office 1950–1952
- Preceded by: Herbert Tinsley
- Succeeded by: Charles W. Burnley

Member of the Kentucky House of Representatives from the 3rd district
- In office January 1, 1950 – January 1, 1952
- Preceded by: J. Earnest Jones
- Succeeded by: L. M. Tipton Reed
- In office January 1, 1944 – January 1, 1948
- Preceded by: Wayne W. Freeman
- Succeeded by: J. Earnest Jones

Personal details
- Born: September 1, 1909 Graves County, Kentucky or Weakley County, Tennessee, U.S. (sources vary)
- Died: November 22, 2001 (aged 92) Lexington, Kentucky, U.S.
- Party: Democratic
- Spouse: Mignon McClain (m. 1941)
- Education: Murray State University; University of Kentucky

Adron Doran (September 1, 1909 – November 22, 2001) was an American politician and educator in the state of Kentucky.

Doran was born near the Kentucky-Tennessee state border in either Graves County, Kentucky or Weakley County, Tennessee in 1909 and attended primary schooling in rural Tennessee. After attending Freed-Hardeman College in Jackson, Tennessee, Doran graduated with a bachelor's degree from Murray State University in Murray, Kentucky. He then worked as an educator in Wingo, Kentucky and was a minister of the Church of Christ.

In 1943, Doran was elected to the Kentucky House of Representatives for the 3rd district representing Graves County, and was reelected in 1945 and 1949. In his final term, he served as Speaker of the House.

Earning a doctorate degree in education in 1950 from the University of Kentucky, Doran later served as president of Morehead State University from 1954 to 1977. He received the Lincoln Key Award from the Kentucky Education Association for "integration at Morehead State University without incident or fanfare". In 1971, he also received a Horatio Alger Award for his work in the educational industry, and in 1965 was named to the University of Kentucky's Hall of Distinguished Alumni. The Adron Doran University Center at Morehead State is named in his honor. In 1941, he married Magnon McClain. He later resided in Lexington, and died at the University of Kentucky Hospital on November 22, 2001, at the age of 92.
