= Randy Bridges =

American politician

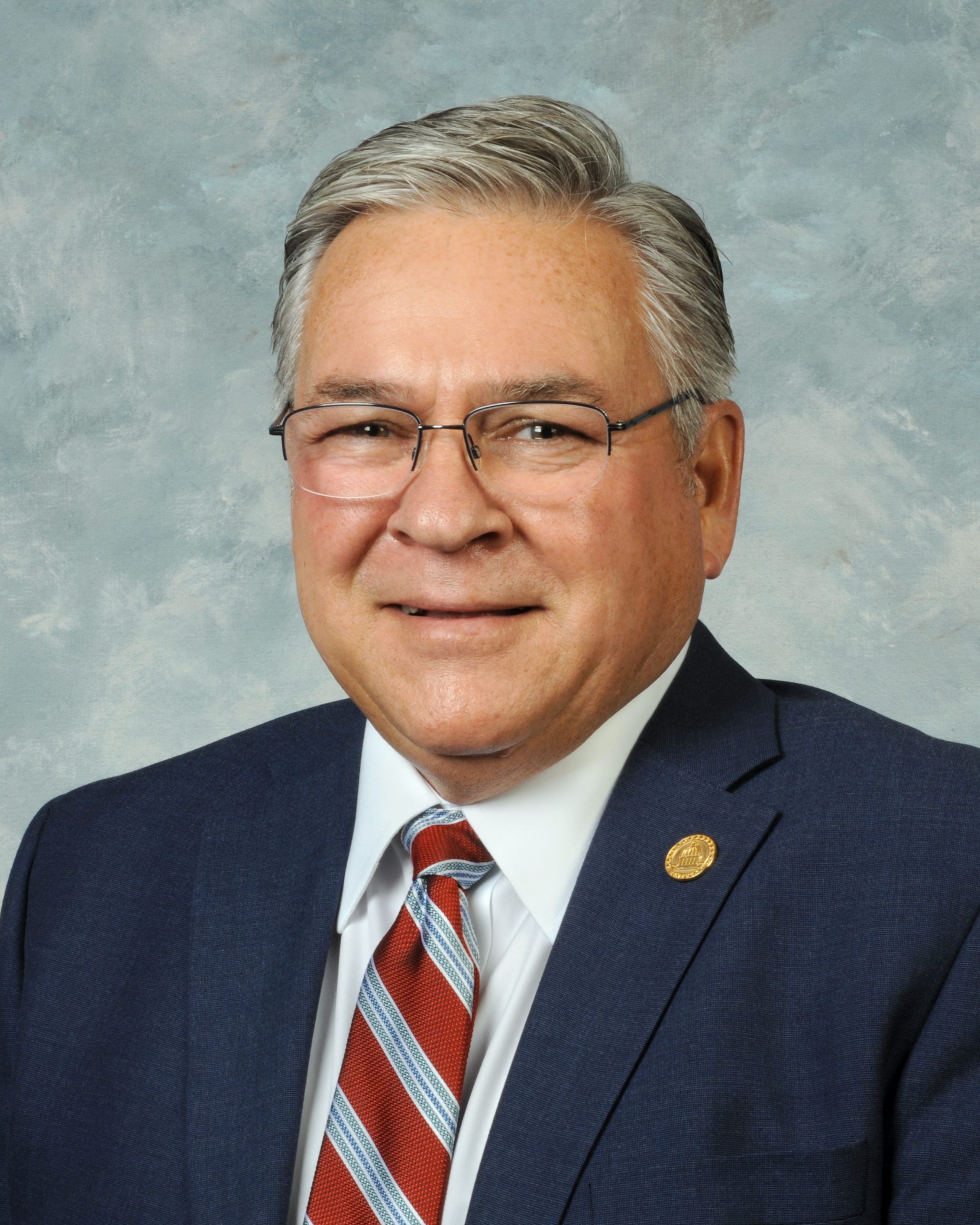
- Official portrait, 2020

Member of the Kentucky House of Representatives from the 3rd district
- Incumbent
- Assumed office January 1, 2019
- Preceded by: Gerald Watkins

Personal details
- Born: November 25, 1961 (age 64) Paducah, Kentucky, US
- Party: Republican
- Children: 2
- Committees: Budget Review Subcommittee on Transportation (Vice Chair); Appropriations and Revenue; Natural Resources and Energy; Transportation

Randall E. Bridges (born November 25, 1961) is an American politician and member of the Kentucky House of Representatives from Kentucky's 3rd House district. Bridges was first elected to the house in 2018 following the retirement of Gerald Watkins. His district includes Livingston and McCracken counties.

== Background ==
Bridges was born and raised in Paducah where he graduated from Reidland High School in 1979. He is a local businessman and has been self-employed since 1986. Currently, he owns Randy Bridges Property Management and is a broker and managing partner with ReMax Realty Group of Paducah.

He is a member of the National Association of Realtors, Paducah Area Chamber of Commerce, Paducah Board of Realtors, and the Rotary Club of Paducah.

== Political career ==
=== Elections ===
2024 Election Results
Party	Candidate	Votes	%
Republican	Randy Bridges	13,455	67.0%
Democratic	Carrie Singler	6,632	33.0%

2022 Election Results
Party	Candidate	Votes	%
Republican	Randy Bridges	10,309	100.0%

2020 Election Results
Party	Candidate	Votes	%
Republican	Randy Bridges	11,333	59.9%
Democratic	Corbin Snardon	7,590	40.1%

2018 Election Results
Party	Candidate	Votes	%
Republican	Randy Bridges	7,484	53.3%
Democratic	Martha Emmons	6,553	46.7%
