= Gerald Watkins =

American politician (born 1954)

Member of the Kentucky House of Representatives from the 3rd district
- In office January 1, 2013 – January 1, 2019
- Preceded by: Brent Housman
- Succeeded by: Randy Bridges

Personal details
- Born: December 8, 1954 (age 71) Paducah, Kentucky
- Party: Democratic
- Education: Paducah Community College; Murray State University

Gerald Lynn Watkins (born December 8, 1954) is an American politician from Kentucky who was a member of the Kentucky House of Representatives from 2013 to 2019, representing the 3rd district. He did not seek reelection in 2018.

== Education ==
Watkins earned his AA from Paducah Community College (now the West Kentucky Community and Technical College), and his BS in business administration and MBA from Murray State University.

== Elections ==
- 2012 Redistricted to District 3, with Representative Brent Housman leaving the Legislature, Watkins was unopposed for the May 22, 2012 Democratic Primary and won the November 6, 2012 General election with 9,349 votes (59.3%) against Republican nominee Jason Crockett.
- 1992 Initially in District 4, Watkins ran in the three-way May 26, 1992 Democratic Primary but lost to Frank Rasche.
- 1998 When Representative Kathy Hogancamp ran for Kentucky Senate and left the seat open, Watkins ran in the three-way 1998 Democratic Primary, but lost to Michael Cherry, who went on to win the November 3, 1998 General election against Republican nominee Sandra Furjanic.
