= Rebecca Raymer =

American politician (born 1980)

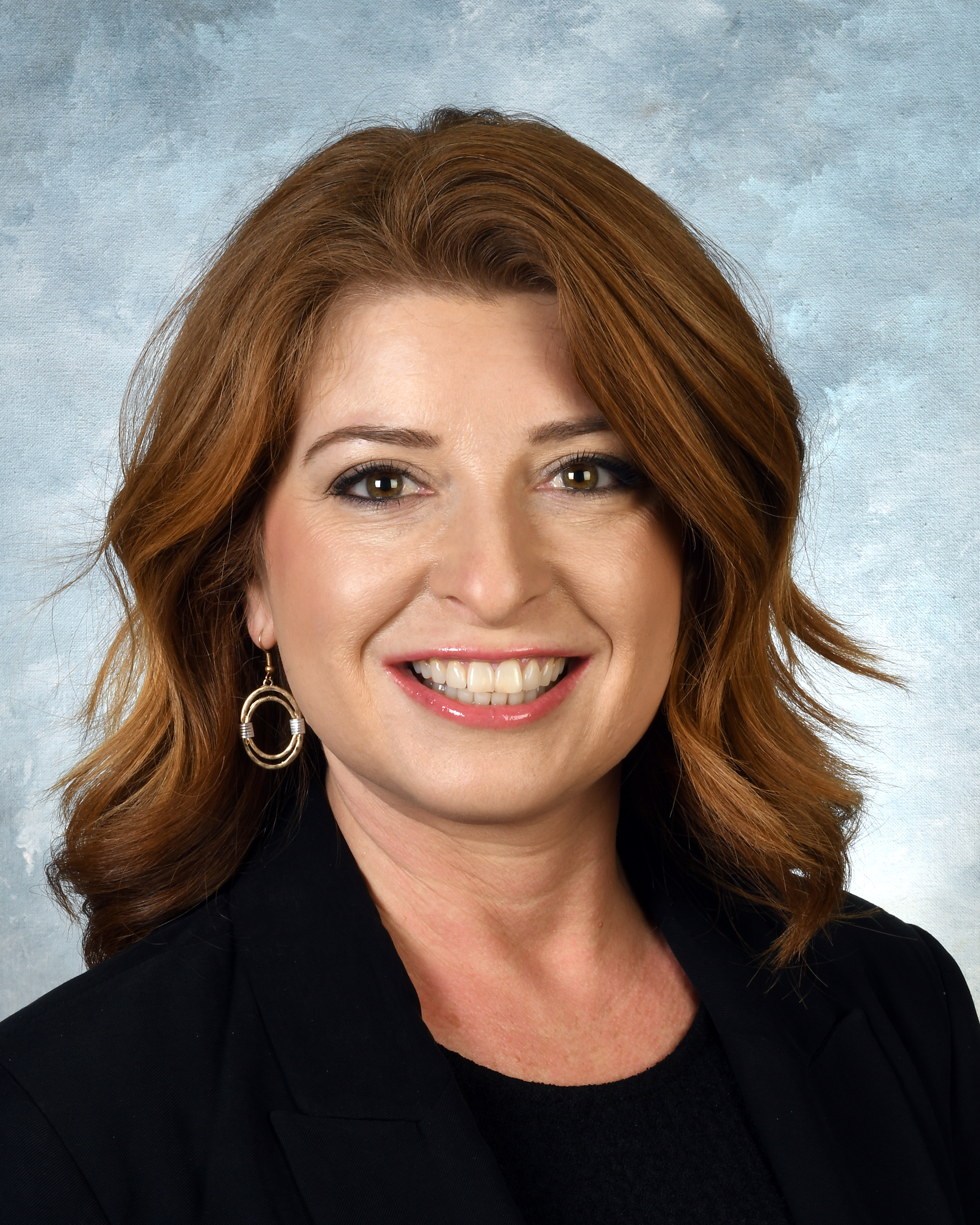
- Official portrait, 2022

Member of the Kentucky House of Representatives from the 15th district
- Incumbent
- Assumed office January 1, 2023
- Preceded by: Melinda Gibbons Prunty

Personal details
- Born: August 25, 1980 (age 46) Butler County, Kentucky
- Party: Republican
- Children: 1
- Education: Western Kentucky University
- Profession: Nurse
- Committees: State Government (Vice Chair); Health Services; Local Government; Licensing, Occupations, and Administrative Regulations

Rebecca Lee Raymer (born August 25, 1980) is an American politician who has served as a member of the Kentucky House of Representatives since January 2023. She represents Kentucky's 15th House district, which includes Butler and Muhlenberg counties.

== Background ==
Raymer was born in Butler County, Kentucky, and currently resides in Morgantown. She graduated from Butler County High School in 1999, and from Western Kentucky University in 2004.

She was employed as a nurse for over 18 years at Greenview Regional Hospital in Bowling Green.

== Political career ==
=== Elections ===
- 2022 Raymer won the 2022 Republican Primary with 2,932 votes and won the 2022 Kentucky House of Representatives election against Democratic candidate Britt Hernandez-Stevenson, winning with 10,664 votes.
- 2024 Raymer won the 2024 Republican primary following the unofficial withdrawal of challenger Kathy Perry-Russell, and was unopposed in the 2024 Kentucky House of Representatives election, winning the latter with 15,707 votes.

Kentucky House of Representatives
Preceded by Melinda Gibbons Prunty	Member of the Kentucky House of Representatives; 2023–present	Succeeded by incumbent
