= Yasir Suleiman =

Palestinian academic

Yasir Suleiman CBE is a scholar of Arabic literature and language, and modern Middle Eastern politics. He is emeritus Sultan Qaboos Bin Said Professor of Modern Arabic Studies at the University of Cambridge. He is a Palestinian Arab living in the diaspora.

Suleiman holds degrees from Amman University, the University of St Andrews, and Durham University. He lectures on topics related to the Middle East. He was selected to be a trustee of the International Prize for Arabic Fiction (2007–2009).

He was appointed Commander of the Order of the British Empire (CBE) in the 2011 Birthday Honours for his services to scholarship.

== Bibliography ==
In addition to authoring books, Yasir Suleiman was an editor of a number of monographs is Arabic studies.

- Arabic in the Fray: Language Ideology and Cultural Politics (2013) Edinburgh University Press, ISBN 978-0748680313
- A War of Words: Language and Conflict in the Middle East (2004) Cambridge University Press, ISBN 0-521-83743-X
- The Arabic Language and National Identity: A Study in Ideology (2003) Georgetown University Press, ISBN 0-87840-395-7
- The Arabic Grammatical Tradition: A Study in Ta'lil (2000) Edinburgh University Press, ISBN 0-7486-0697-1
