= Frank Rasche =

American politician

Member of the Kentucky House of Representatives from the 3rd district
- In office January 1, 1993 – August 15, 2008
- Preceded by: J. Albert Jones
- Succeeded by: Brent Housman

Personal details
- Born: August 5, 1946 (age 79)
- Party: Democratic

Arthur Frank Rasche III (born August 5, 1946) is an American politician from Kentucky who was a member of the Kentucky House of Representatives from 1993 to 2008. Rasche was first elected in 1992 after incumbent representative J. Albert Jones retired. He resigned from the house in August 2008 in order to become the legislative liaison for the state Department of Education.
