= Morehead State University =

Public university in Morehead, Kentucky, US

- Former names: Morehead Normal School (1887–1922); Morehead State Normal School (1922–1926); Morehead State Normal School and Teachers College (1926–1930); Morehead State Teachers College (1930–1948); Morehead State College (1948–1966)
- Motto: Lux
- Motto in English: Light
- Type: Public university
- Established: 1887
- Academic affiliations: Space-grant
- Endowment: $91 million (2026)
- President: Joseph A. (Jay) Morgan
- Faculty: 405
- Administrative staff: 591
- Students: 8,401 (fall 2025)
- Undergraduates: 7,941 (fall 2025)
- Postgraduates: 460 (fall 2025)
- Location: Morehead, Kentucky, United States; 38.189°N 83.431°W
- Campus: Rural 700 acres (2 km^{2})
- Colors: Blue and Gold
- Nickname: Eagles
- Sporting affiliations: NCAA Division I FCS; OVC, Pioneer Football League
- Mascot: Beaker
- Website: www.moreheadstate.edu

Morehead State University (MSU) is a public university in Morehead, Kentucky, United States. The university began as Morehead Normal School, which opened its doors in 1887. The Craft Academy for Excellence in Science and Mathematics, a two-year residential early college high school on the university's campus, was established in 2014.

== History ==
The school opened in October 1887 as the private Morehead Normal School. Just one student attended the first day of classes, held in a rented cottage where the Adron Doran University Center now stands. The school closed in spring 1922 when the Kentucky General Assembly established Morehead State Normal School, a state institution that accepted its first students in the fall of 1923. The institution was renamed Morehead State Normal School and Teachers College in 1926; it graduated its first class the following year. The name was shortened to Morehead State Teachers College in 1930 and to Morehead State College in 1948; it became Morehead State University in 1966. Fourteen people, starting with Frank C. Button, have served as president. Joseph A. Morgan assumed office as the 14th president on July 1, 2017.

=== Presidents ===
No.	Name	Tenure
1	Frank C. Button	1923 – 1929
2	John Howard Payne	1929 – 1935
3	Harvey A. Babb	1934 – 1940
4	William H. Vaughn	1940 – 1946
5	William J. Baird	1946 – 1951
6	Charles R. Spain	1951 – 1954
7	Adron Doran	1954 – 1977
8	Morris L. Norfleet	1977 – 1984
9	Herb F. Reinhard Jr.	1984 – 1986
10	A. D. Albright	1986 – 1987
11	C. Nelson Grote	1987 – 1992
12	Ronald G. Eaglin	1992 – 2004
13	Wayne D. Andrews	2005 – 2017
14	Joseph "Jay" Morgan	2017 – present

== Campus ==
- Morehead State University
- U.S. National Register of Historic Places
- U.S. Historic district
- Location within Kentucky Location within the United States
- Location: Bounded by University Blvd., Battson Ave. and Ward Oates Dr., Morehead, Kentucky
- Coordinates: 38°11′12″N 83°26′03″W
- Area: 12 acres (4.9 ha)
- Architectural style: Late 19th And 20th Century Revivals, Collegiate Gothic
- NRHP reference No.: 94001381
- Added to NRHP: November 25, 1994

Morehead State University is located in the foothills of the Daniel Boone National Forest in Rowan County. The more than 700-acre main campus within the city limits of Morehead includes more than 50 major structures with a total replacement value of more than $650 million. Beyond the city, the university's real estate holdings include the 320-acre Derrickson Agricultural Complex, Eagle Trace, a par-72, 6,902-yard public golf course, and 166 acres of the Browning Orchard. The instructional plant includes 135 classrooms and 150 laboratories. Housing facilities include space for approximately 2,900 students. The second component of the Space Science Center opened in 2009—a $16.6 million instruction and research support facility.

A portion of the campus was named as a historic district on the National Register of Historic Places. The contributing properties include the following buildings: the President's Home, Senff Natatorium (demolished in 2008), Button Auditorium, Fields Hall, Camden-Carroll Library, Allie Young Hall, Rader Hall, Grote-Thompson Hall, and the Breckinridge Training School. All were designed by the Olmstead Brothers.

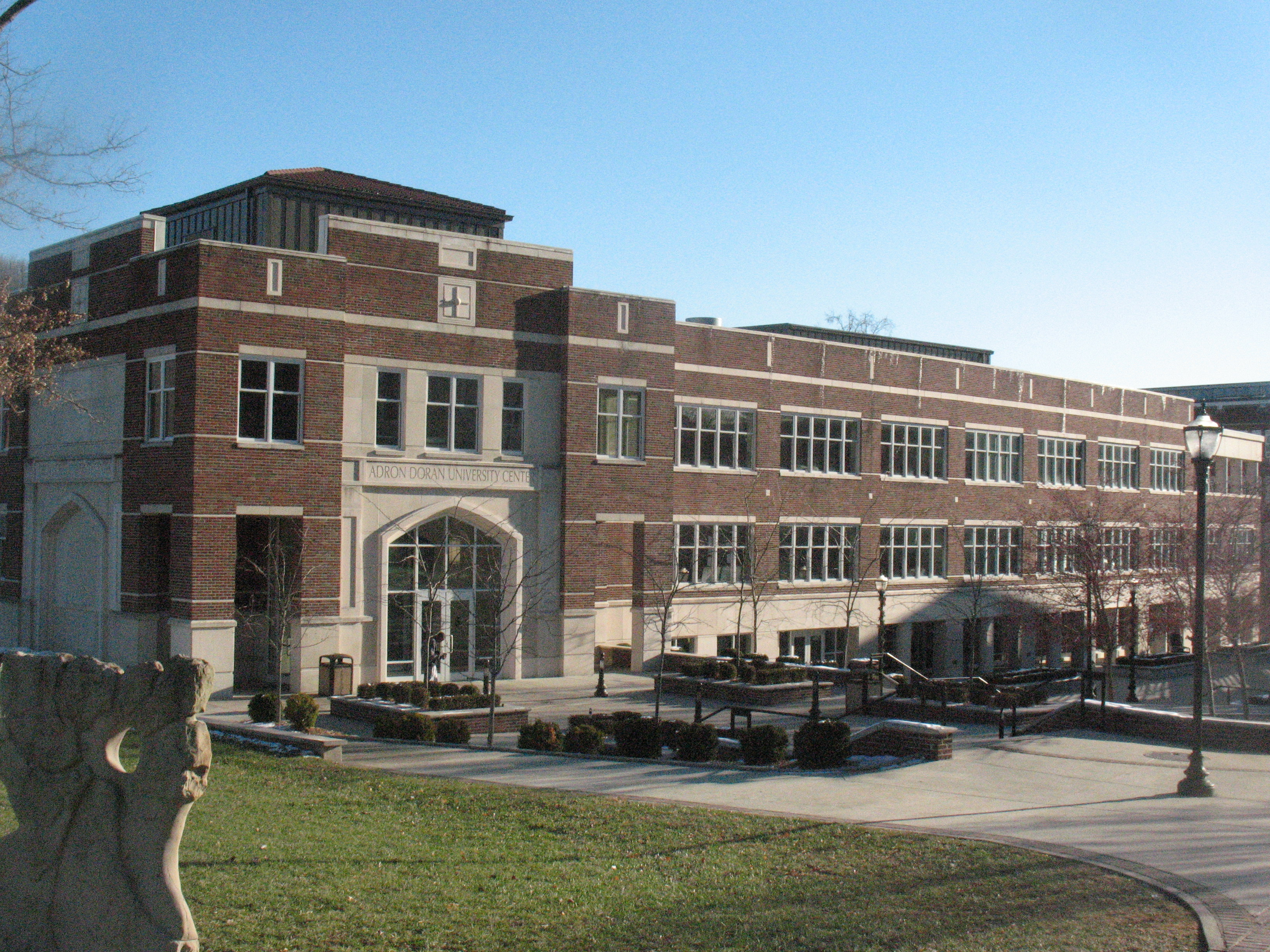
Adron Doran University Center

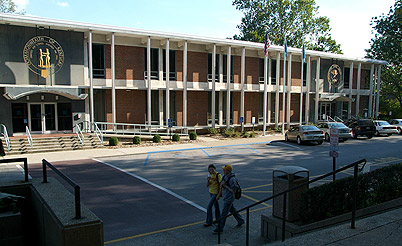
Howell-McDowell Administration Building

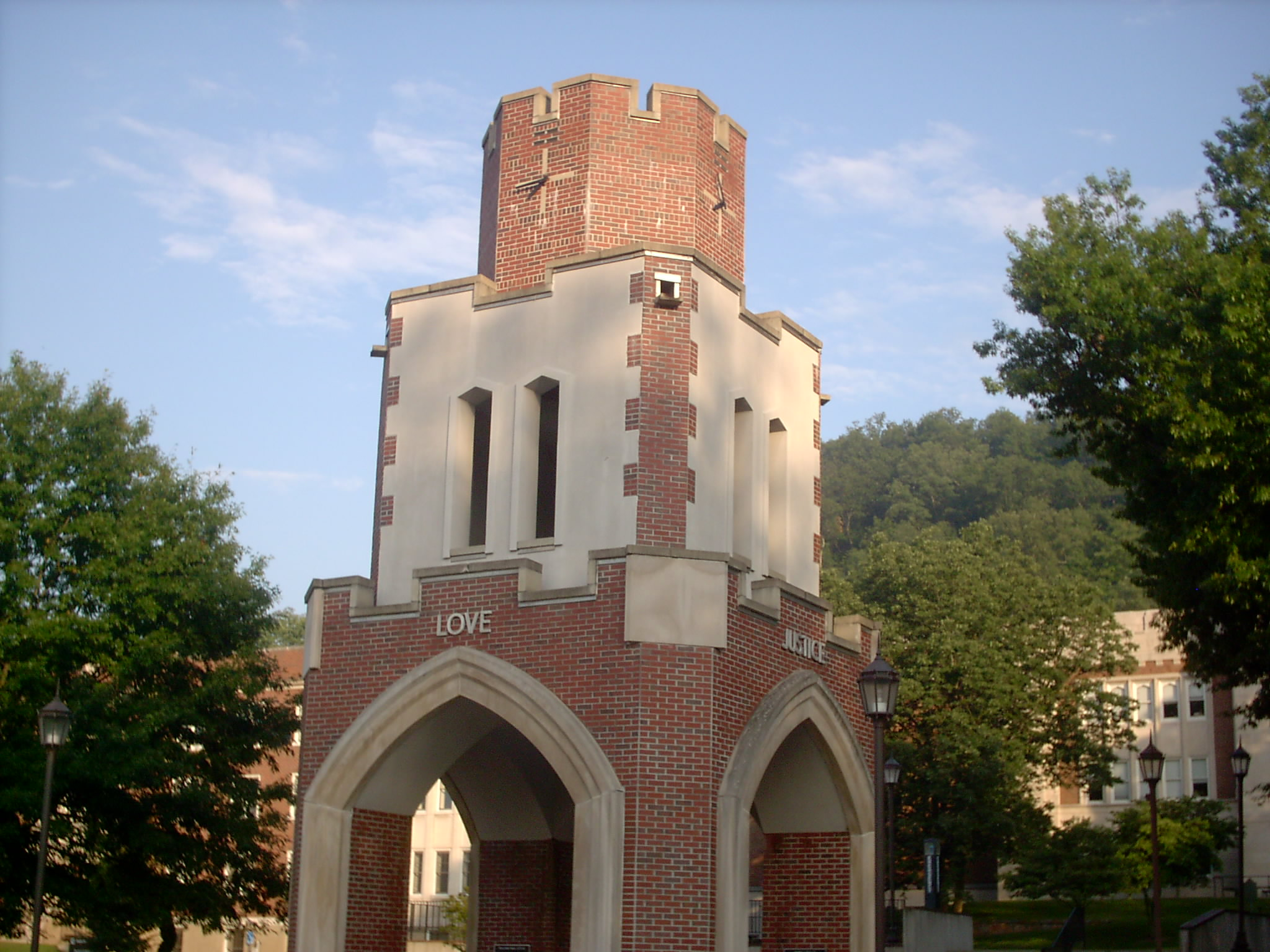
Little Bell Tower

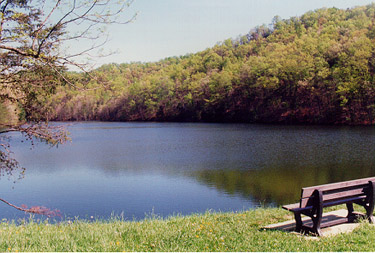
Eagle Lake

== Academics ==
Academic rankings

Regional
- U.S. News & World Report: 41

Morehead State University is accredited by the Commission on Colleges of the Southern Association of Colleges and Schools. It offers over 212 degree programs at the two-year, four-year, and graduate levels through four colleges: Caudill College of Arts, Humanities, & Social Sciences; Elmer R. Smith College of Business & Technology; Ernst & Sara Lane Volgenau College of Education; and Greene College of Science & Engineering. It was the first institution in Kentucky to offer a complete degree program online, the Master of Business Administration (MBA). MSU is one of five institutions in the U.S. with a bachelor's degree in space science. Over 77,000 persons have received degrees from MSU.

The 2027 U.S. News & World Report Best Colleges Rankings listed Morehead State at 21st place among public "regional universities" in the South and 41st overall among all regional universities in the South.

=== Craft Academy for Excellence in Science and Mathematics ===
The Craft Academy for Excellence in Science and Mathematics was established in 2014. It is a two-year residential early college high school serving approximately 220 high school juniors and seniors at Morehead State University. Students live in Craft Tower residence hall on campus and take MSU classes during their time at the academy, graduating with a Craft Academy high school diploma as well as at least 60 hours of MSU college credit, with tuition, room and board, and meal plan all free of charge. The academy is funded in large part by Joe Craft and Ambassador Kelly Craft, who donated over $10 million to the academy, the largest donation in MSU history.

== Student life ==
Undergraduate demographics as of Fall 2023
Race and ethnicity	Total
White	86%
Black	3%
Hispanic	3%
Two or more races	3%
Unknown	2%
Asian	1%
International student	1%
Economic diversity
Low-income (Note: The percentage of students who received an income-based federal Pell grant intended for low-income students.)	49%
Affluent (Note: The percentage of students who are a part of the American middle class at the bare minimum.)	51%

The Morehead State University Arts and Humanities Council, established in 2003, encourages dialogue and partnerships in the arts. Part of a larger initiative within the Caudill College of Arts, Humanities and Social Sciences, the Council works to develop cultural opportunities both on and off campus. Morehead, long known for its patronage of the arts in Kentucky with such organizations as the Kentucky Folk Art Center and the Kentucky Center for Traditional Music, was the childhood home of philanthropist Lucille Caudill Little. Named after Lucille Little, MSU's Little Company is a touring troupe of students in the Theatre Department that performs plays and conducts workshops for up to 100 schools in the area each year. Along with theatre, Morehead State University has a well-developed dance program.

Morehead State Public Radio (MSPR) is governed by the Board of Regents at Morehead State University. MSPR is operated by its flagship station WMKY at 90.3 FM in Morehead. WMKY in Morehead is licensed for 50,000 watts and serves more than 20 counties in Kentucky, Ohio, and West Virginia. The WMKY studios are located in Breckinridge Hall on the campus of Morehead State University. WMKY has operated since 1965.

There are several fraternities and sororities on campus.

== Athletics ==
The Morehead State athletic teams are called the Eagles. The eagle mascot is named Beaker, and the school colors are blue and gold. The university is a member of the NCAA Division I ranks (for football, the Football Championship Subdivision), primarily competing in the Ohio Valley Conference (OVC) since the 1948–49 academic year; while its football team competes in the Pioneer Football League (PFL). The Eagles previously competed in the Kentucky Intercollegiate Athletic Conference (KIAC; now currently known as the River States Conference (RSC) since the 2016–17 school year) of the National Association of Intercollegiate Athletics (NAIA) from 1933–34 to 1947–48; and in the defunct West Virginia Intercollegiate Athletic Conference (WVIAC) from 1929–30 to 1932–33.

Morehead State competes in 17 intercollegiate varsity sports: Men's sports baseball, basketball, cross country, football, golf and track & field; while women's include basketball, beach volleyball, cross country, golf, soccer, softball, track & field and volleyball; and co-ed sports include cheerleading, dance and rifle.

With 2017–18 being its initial season and the OVC not yet sponsoring the sport, the beach volleyball team will compete as an independent. The football team competes as a member of the Pioneer Football League, a non-scholarship Division I (FCS) league.

=== Accomplishments ===
Morehead State Eagles men's basketball won the 2009 OVC tournament championship, sending them to the NCAA tournament for the first time since 1984. At the 2011 NCAA Division I men's basketball tournament, 13th-seeded Morehead State upset Louisville 62–61. It was the second NCAA Tournament win for Morehead State in a three-year span. The Eagles also beat Alabama State in the 2009 Opening Round game. The Eagles then faced 12th-seeded Richmond in the third round, which was only the ninth time in tournament history that a 12–13 match-up occurred in the round of 32. The coed cheerleading squad has won 23 national championships, and the all-female squad has won 10 national titles.

== Notable alumni ==
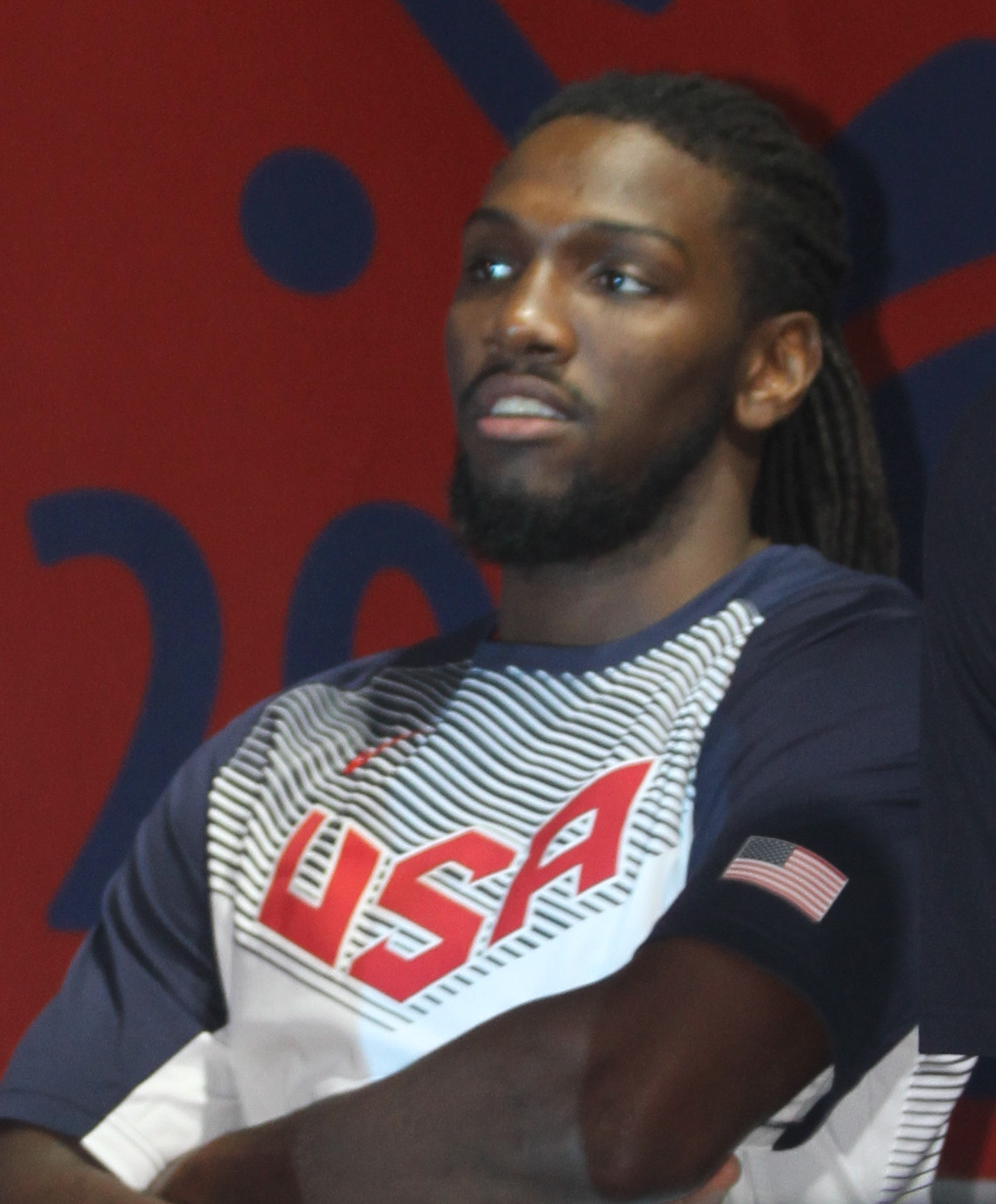
Kenneth Faried

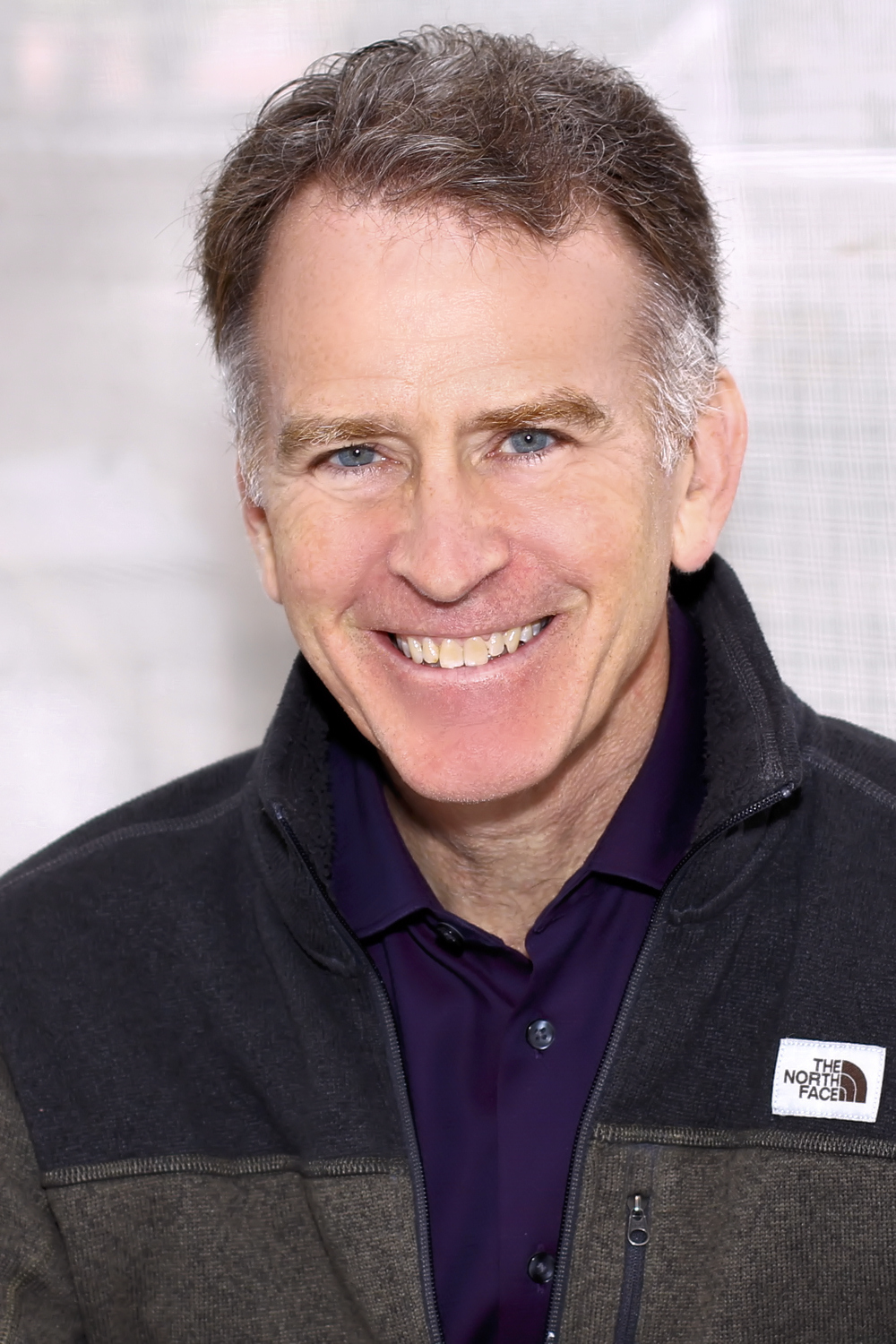
Steve Inskeep

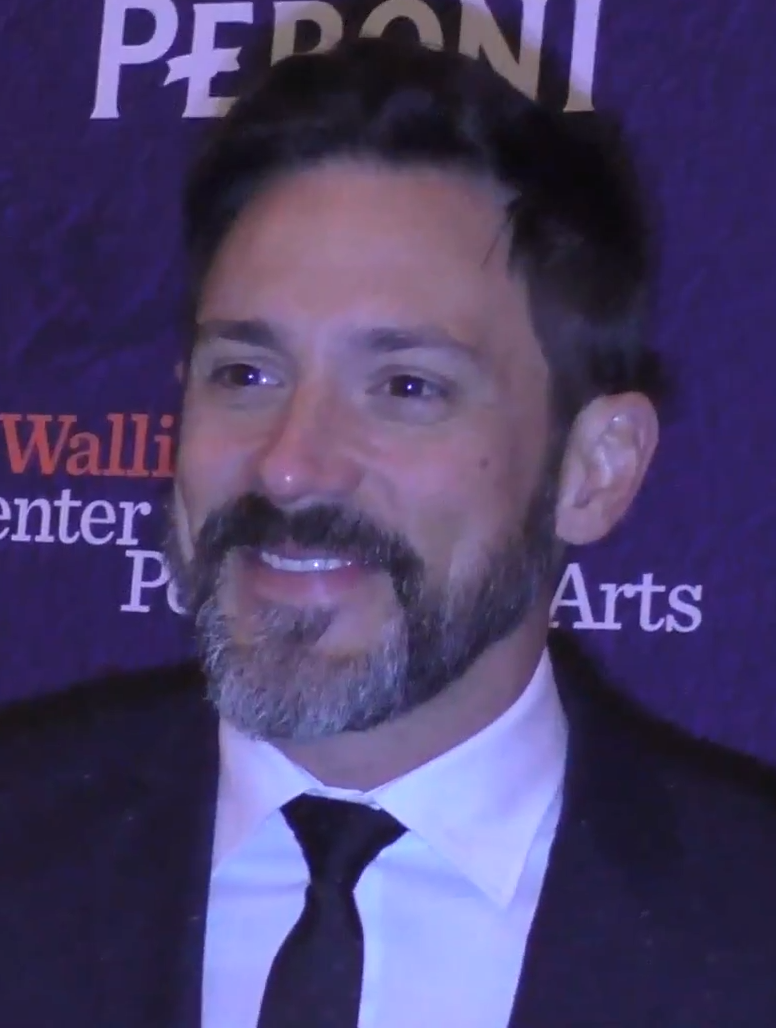
Steve Kazee

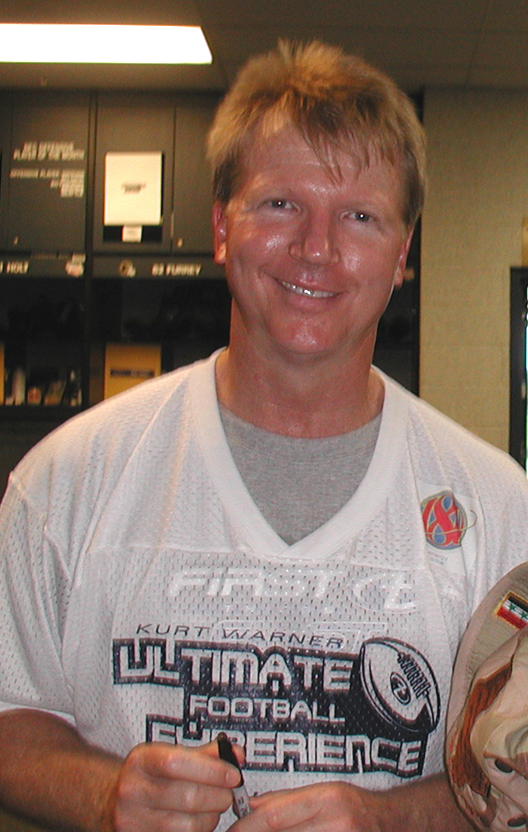
Phil Simms

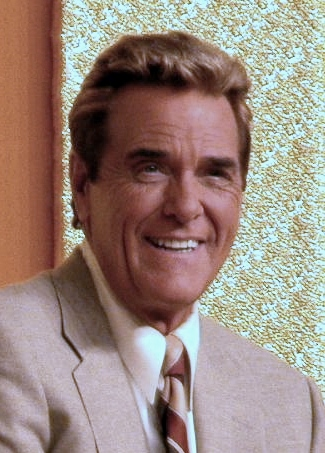
Chuck Woolery
