= Adron Doran University Center =

Student activity center in Morehead, Kentucky

Coordinates: 38.1850°N 83.4346°W

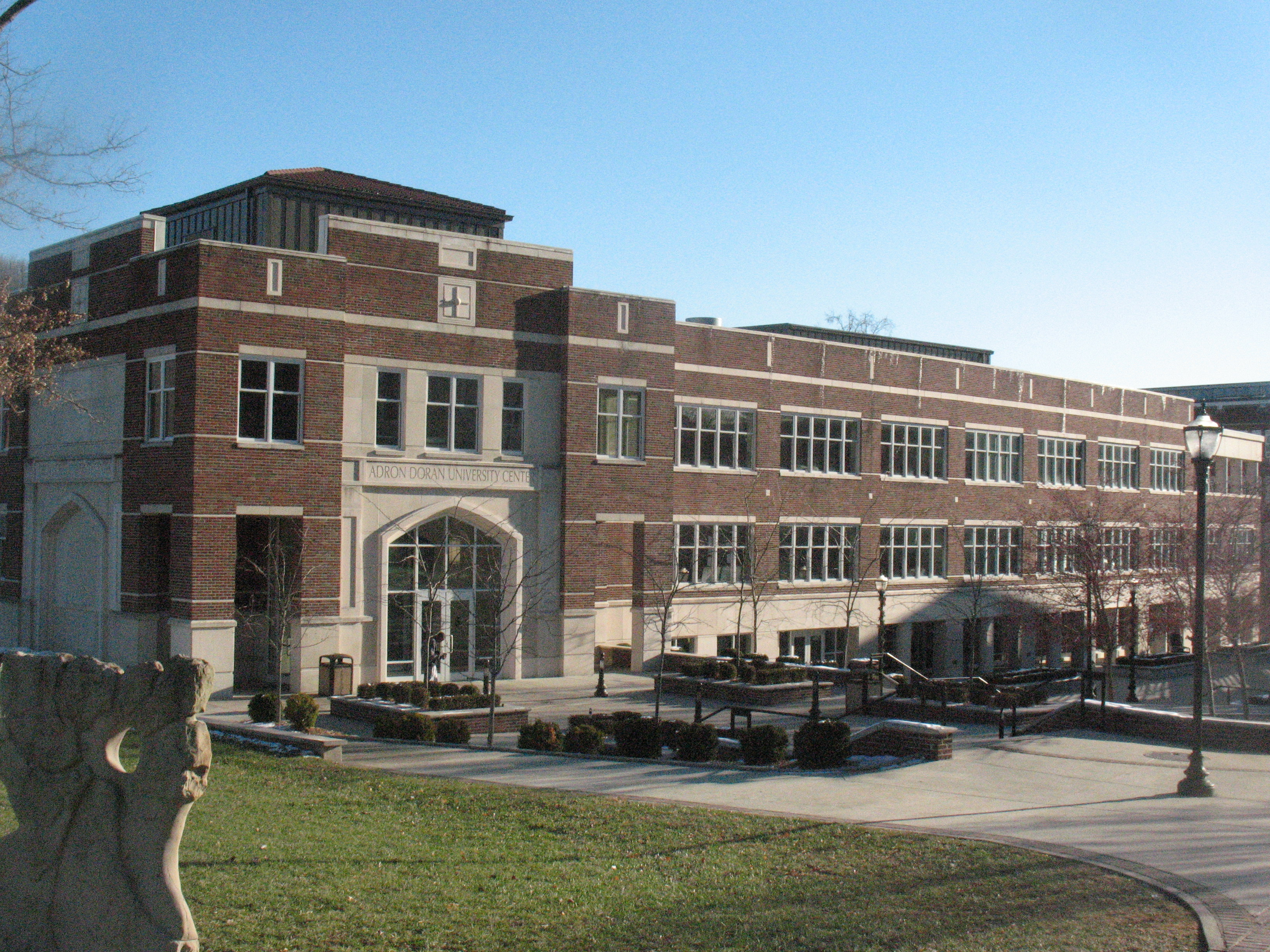
Adron Doran University Center

Adron Doran University Center, commonly known and referred to as ADUC, is the primary student activity center of Morehead State University, located in Morehead, Kentucky.

== History ==
Adron Doran, who had served as president from 1954 to 1977, played a pivotal role in the expansion of Morehead State from a rural teacher training school into a large-scale state university. In addition to expanding the academic curriculum and introducing racial integration to the campus, Doran also felt the need to make the campus of Morehead State feel more like a home to students. Along with adding more dormitories and on-campus living areas, Doran also sought to create a designated building to serve students in a variety of ways, as a place to study, socialize, and serve basic needs for students. In addition, Doran would make sure that the building bore his namesake.

== Adron Doran ==
Adron Doran was born September 1, 1909, in Graves County, Western Kentucky. Some would say that he was one of the most influential and progressive of all the former presidents, because of the vast changes he brought about in a time when the school was still in a very infantile state. He graduated From Freed-Hardman College in Henderson, Tennessee. Doran was a Former Kentucky House speaker and state representative. He earned a doctorate from the University of Kentucky in 1950.

He was named President of Morehead State University in 1954 and then retired in 1977. Doran died November 23, 2001.

== ADUC today ==
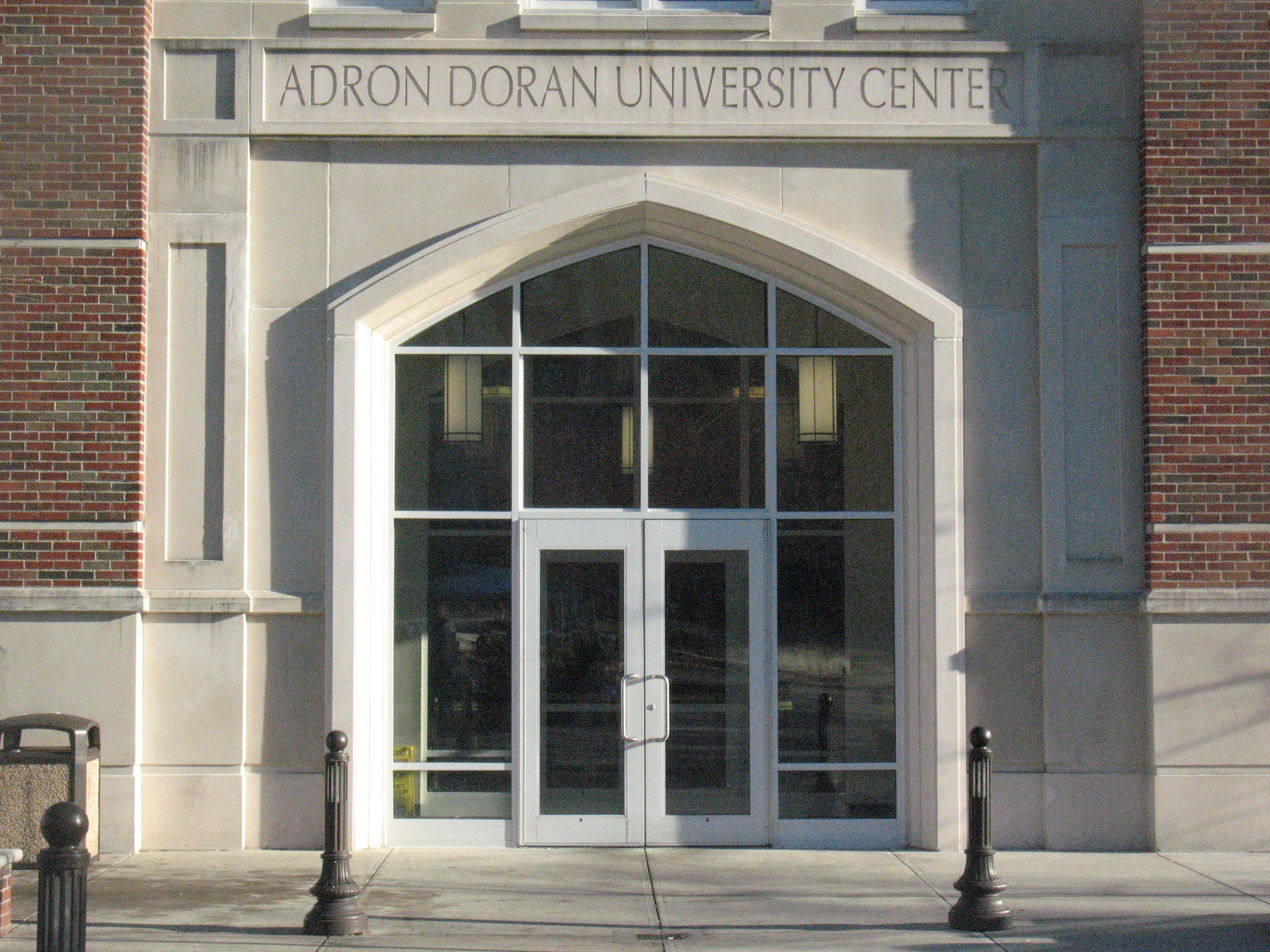
Front entrance

The building has 3 floors. The first floor contains a sitting area, the Prefontaine Pub, a 100-person theater area, and the bookstore, which transitioned ownership to Barnes & Noble in 2022. The second floor contains a food court with a variety of restaurants. Food services are run by Aramark The third floor is composed of a number of multi-use rooms and a ballroom, all of which can be reserved by students and clubs for campus activities.
