= Meyer Weil =

American politician (1830–1891)

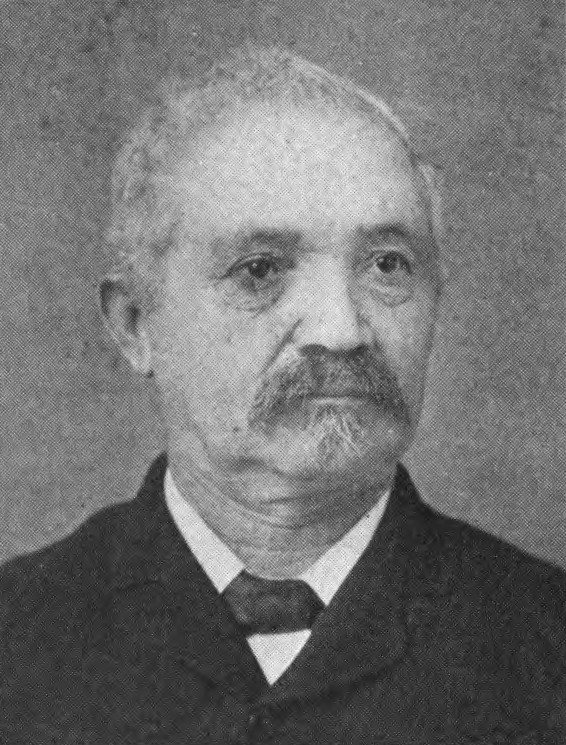

Mayor of Paducah, Kentucky
- In office 1871–1875
- Preceded by: John W. Sauner
- Succeeded by: John G. Fisher
- In office 1877 – March 1881
- Preceded by: John G. Fisher
- Succeeded by: Charles Reed

Member of the Kentucky House of Representatives from McCracken County
- In office August 1, 1887 – April 13, 1891
- Preceded by: Thomas E. Moss
- Succeeded by: I. M. Quigley

Personal details
- Born: June 29, 1830 Hohenzollern, Prussia
- Died: April 13, 1891 (aged 60) Paducah, Kentucky, U.S.
- Party: Democratic

Meyer Weil (June 29, 1830 – April 13, 1891) was an American politician who served as mayor of Paducah, Kentucky from 1871 to 1875 and from 1877 to 1881 and as member of the Kentucky House of Representatives from 1887 until his death.

== Biography ==
Weil was born in Hohenzollern, Prussia, and immigrated to the United States in 1847. He lived in Smithland, Wadesboro and Mayfield before moving to Paducah, Kentucky in 1863. In 1887 he was elected to the Kentucky House of Representatives and was reelected in 1889. Weil died at his home in Paducah. Weil was Jewish.
