= Patricia J. Johnson =

American microbiologist

Patricia Johnson
- Born: Patricia Jean Johnson; 20th century
- Education: Murray State University (BS); University of Michigan (PhD)
- Awards: Member of the National Academy of Sciences (2019)
- Scientific career
- Workplaces: University of California, Los Angeles; Rockefeller University; Netherlands Cancer Institute
- Thesis: A molecular comparison of actin genes in sea urchins (Strongylocentrotus franciscanus, S. purpuratus, and Lytechinus pictus) (1984)
- Website: bioscience.ucla.edu/faculty/patricia-j-johnson

Patricia Jean Johnson (born 20th century) is an American microbiologist.

She is a Distinguished Professor of Microbiology at the University of California, Los Angeles (UCLA). She works on the parasite Trichomonas vaginalis, which is responsible for trichomoniasis – one of the most prevalent sexually transmitted infections in the United States.

Johnson was elected a member of the National Academy of Sciences (NAS) in 2019.

== Early life and education ==
Johnson grew up on a farm in Virginia.

She studied biology at Murray State University, where she specialised in molecular biology. She moved to the University of Michigan for her graduate studies, earning her doctorate in 1984. She was supported by the Burroughs Wellcome fund. Her thesis investigated the evolution of exons and introns in actin genes of sea urchins (Strongylocentrotus franciscanus, Strongylocentrotus purpuratus, and Lytechinus pictus).

== Research and career ==
After her PhD, Johnson was a postdoctoral researcher with Piet Borst at the Netherlands Cancer Institute. In the Netherlands Johnson worked on Trypanosoma. She then joined Rockefeller University, where she worked with Christian de Duve. She studied the parasite Trypanosoma brucei, the parasite that causes African trypanosomiasis.

Johnson joined the University of California, Los Angeles as an assistant professor in 1988, and was promoted to professor in 1998. At the University of California, Johnson worked on bacterial evolution.

Johnson studies the molecular and cell biology of Trichomonas vaginalis, a parasite that causes trichomoniasis, one of the most prevalent sexually transmitted infections worldwide. Johnson cloned the first Trichomonas vaginalis gene in 1990. She first sequenced the genome of Trichomonas vaginalis in 2007, working with Jane M. Carlton at New York University. To sequence the gene required the efforts of 66 scientists working in 10 countries. Sequencing the genome revealed detailed information about the mechanism by which Trichomonas adheres to and kills human cells. It is estimated that 275 million people worldwide live with the parasite. This work elucidated more knowledge on how Eukaryotic cells evolved. She investigates the pathogenic mechanisms that permit Trichomonas vaginalis to establish infection. Her work considers new means of diagnosing and treating Trichomonas vaginalis.

Trichomonas vaginalis is one of the most divergent eukaryotes, so provides a good platform to study biodiversity. Johnson studies different aspects of trichomonad biology, including drug resistance, organelle biogenesis, gene expression, genomics and host-parasite interactions. Johnson is also investigating the link between Trichomonas vaginalis and prostate cancer. In 2014 she found that Trichomonas vaginalis secreted a protein that can invade benign cancerous prostate cells.

She serves as an associate editor of PLOS Pathogens.

== Awards and honours ==
- 2004 National Institutes of Health (NIH) MERIT Award
- 2011 Elected to the American Society for Microbiology
- 2019 Elected a member of the National Academy of Sciences
