= William F. Paxton =

American politician

William F. Paxton III
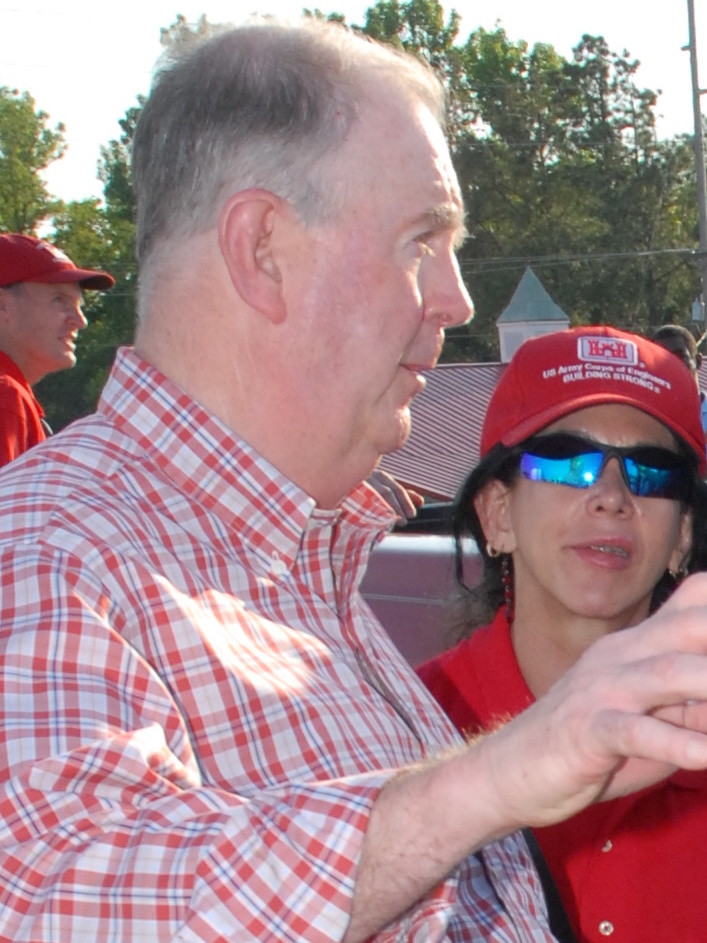
- Born: September 12, 1946 (age 79); Paducah, KY, U.S.A.
- Occupations: Politician, Former Banker
- Title: Mayor of Paducah
- Term: 2000–2012
- Predecessor: J. Albert Jones
- Spouse: Lucy Weil Paxton

William F. Paxton III, better known to his friends as Bill, is a conservative politician who served as Mayor of Paducah, KY from 2000 to 2012. Before his tenure as the Mayor of Paducah, Paxton served a portion of an elected term from 1998 as a City Commissioner.

== Early life ==
Paxton studied at Murray State University, the Kentucky School of Banking, and the Graduate School of Banking at Louisiana State University. He spent 30 years of service with Paducah's Citizen/Mercantile/Firstar Bank & Trust Company, which he left upon entering Paducah Politics.

== Mayor of Paducah ==
Paxton's current reign as Mayor has seen the critically acclaimed Artist Relocation Program and Lowertown Arts District grow to success as well as continued work with the nearby Uranium Enrichment Plant. He won re-election in 2004 and 2008 in the 2008 election. Though successful, his 2008 win was by the narrow margin of 48 votes while running against longtime-City Commissioner Robert Coleman. A mayor may only serve three terms in Paducah and as such, he may no longer run for the office after 2008.
