= Charles Nelson (Kentucky politician) =

American politician

Member of the Kentucky House of Representatives from the 15th district
- In office January 1, 1989 – January 1, 1997
- Preceded by: James C. Brown
- Succeeded by: Brent Yonts

Personal details
- Born: October 31, 1925
- Died: October 28, 2019 (aged 93)
- Party: Democratic

Charles Laman "Preacher" Nelson (October 31, 1925 – October 28, 2019) was an American politician from Kentucky who was a member of the Kentucky House of Representatives from 1989 to 1997. Nelson was first elected in 1988, defeating incumbent Republican representative James C. Brown. Nelson did not seek reelection in 1996.

He died in October 2019 at age 93.
