= Roger Withrow =

American Paralympic shooter

Personal information
- Full name: Roger Kent Withrow
- Nationality: United States
- Born: August 28, 1957 (age 68) Wyoming, United States
Medal record
Representing United States
Paralympic Games
Shooting
Gold medal – first place	1984 New York / Stoke Mandeville	Men's Air rifle prone 2-6

Roger Kent Withrow (born August 28, 1957) is a former Paralympics shooter from the United States.

He is the only Paralympic shooter from America to win gold at the 1984 Summer Paralympics.
