= Kentucky's 3rd House of Representatives district =

American legislative district

Kentucky's 3rd State House of Representatives district
Representative
Randy Bridges; R–Paducah
since January 1, 2019
- Registration: 44.8% Democratic; 43.7% Republican; 10.8% No party preference
- Demographics: 81.3% White; 9.6% Black; 3.5% Hispanic; 1.2% Asian; 0.2% Native American; 0.4% Other; 3.8% Multiracial
- Population (2023): 44,324
- Registered voters (2025): 38,301

Kentucky's 3rd House of Representatives district is one of 100 districts in the Kentucky House of Representatives. Located in the far west of the state, it comprises the counties of Livingston, and part of McCracken. It has been represented by Randy Bridges (R–Paducah) since 2019. As of 2023, the district had a population of 44,324.

== Voter registration ==
On January 1, 2025, the district had 38,301 registered voters, who were registered with the following parties.

Party	Registration	
Party	Voters	%
Democratic	17,176	44.84
Republican	16,742	43.71
Independent	1,786	4.66
Libertarian	182	0.48
Green	33	0.09
Constitution	12	0.03
Socialist Workers	5	0.01
Reform	2	0.01
"Other"	2,363	6.17
Total	38,301	100.00
Source: Kentucky State Board of Elections

== List of members representing the district ==
Member	Party	Years	Electoral history	District location
J. Albert Jones (Paducah)	Democratic	January 1, 1987 – January 1, 1993	Elected in 1986. Reelected in 1988. Reelected in 1990. Retired.	1985–1993; McCracken County (part).
Frank Rasche (Paducah)	Democratic	January 1, 1993 – August 15, 2008	Elected in 1992. Reelected in 1994. Reelected in 1996. Reelected in 1998. Reelected in 2000. Reelected in 2002. Reelected in 2004. Reelected in 2006. Resigned to work for the Kentucky; Department of Education.	1993–1997; McCracken County (part).
Frank Rasche (Paducah)	Democratic	January 1, 1993 – August 15, 2008	Elected in 1992. Reelected in 1994. Reelected in 1996. Reelected in 1998. Reelected in 2000. Reelected in 2002. Reelected in 2004. Reelected in 2006. Resigned to work for the Kentucky; Department of Education.	1997–2003
Frank Rasche (Paducah)	Democratic	January 1, 1993 – August 15, 2008	Elected in 1992. Reelected in 1994. Reelected in 1996. Reelected in 1998. Reelected in 2000. Reelected in 2002. Reelected in 2004. Reelected in 2006. Resigned to work for the Kentucky; Department of Education.	2003–2015
Brent Housman (Paducah)	Republican	January 1, 2009 – January 1, 2013	Elected in 2008. Reelected in 2010. Retired.	2003–2015
Gerald Watkins (Paducah)	Democratic	January 1, 2013 – January 1, 2019	Elected in 2012. Reelected in 2014. Reelected in 2016. Retired.	2003–2015
Gerald Watkins (Paducah)	Democratic	January 1, 2013 – January 1, 2019	Elected in 2012. Reelected in 2014. Reelected in 2016. Retired.	2015–2023
Randy Bridges (Paducah)	Republican	January 1, 2019 – present	Elected in 2018. Reelected in 2020. Reelected in 2022. Reelected in 2024. Reelected in 2026.	2015–2023
Randy Bridges (Paducah)	Republican	January 1, 2019 – present	Elected in 2018. Reelected in 2020. Reelected in 2022. Reelected in 2024. Reelected in 2026.	2023–present
