= Taghreed El-Khodary =

Palestinian journalist

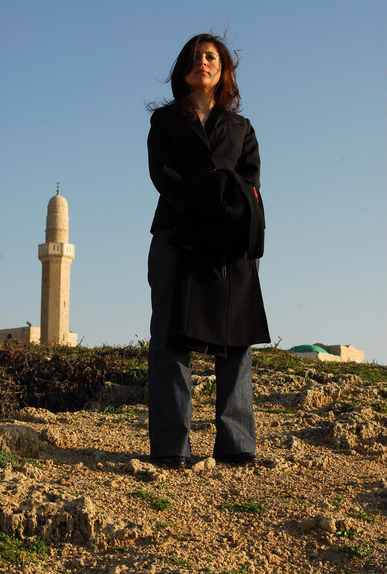
- Born: Gaza
- Education: American University of Cairo; Murray State University
- Occupations: Freelance journalist, researcher
- Employer: The New York Times (formerly) Carnegie Endowment (visiting)

Taghreed El-Khodary is a Palestinian journalist who is a visiting scholar in the Middle East Program at the Carnegie Endowment, where her research focuses on the future of Gaza. She is also a 2010 Heinrich Boell Fellow. She is editor at fanack.com,

== Background ==
El-Khodary was born in Gaza and holds an undergraduate degree in communications from the American University in Cairo and an MS in mass communication from Murray State University, which she attended as a Fulbright Scholar. El-Khodary later returned to the U.S. to take up a Nieman Fellowship at Harvard University in 2006 as the Ruth Cowan Nash Fellow, and again in 2010 as a Heinrich Boell Fellow and visiting scholar with the Carnegie Endowment for International Peace.

== Professional work ==
El-Khodary has worked as a radio reporter for Voice of America; television reporter for Al Jazeera; and TV news correspondent for Al Hayat LBC, in addition to work on individual documentaries for National Geographic, PBS (US), ITV (UK), and CBC (Canada). In 2010 she led a three-week mentorship program on election coverage for journalists in northern Sudan under the auspices of the United Nations Development Programme and Linnaeus University’s Fojo Media Institute.

El-Khodary came to public attention during the 2008–2009 Israel–Gaza conflict, when Israel prevented correspondents from crossing the Gaza-Israel border and she was among the few correspondents reporting from Gaza. She describes herself as among the "very few objective reporters" covering the conflict. and was praised for the "in-depth, balanced coverage" of the conflict. She feels that her identity, as a Palestinian, was useful to her reporting in Gaza because she was able to "live the story".
