= Brent Yonts =

American politician (1949–2021)

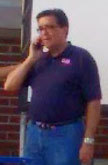
- Yonts at an event in Greenville, Kentucky, in 2015

Member of the Kentucky House of Representatives from the 15th district
- In office January 1, 1997 – January 1, 2017
- Preceded by: Charles Nelson
- Succeeded by: Melinda Gibbons Prunty

Personal details
- Born: March 21, 1949 Greenville, Kentucky, U.S.
- Died: August 20, 2021 (aged 72) Owensboro, Kentucky, U.S.
- Party: Democratic
- Spouse: Jan Yonts
- Children: 3
- Education: Murray State University; University of Kentucky College of Law

Military service
- Branch/service: United States Army; Adjutant General's Corps
- Years of service: 1971–1973
- Rank: First Lieutenant

Larry Brent Yonts (March 21, 1949 – August 20, 2021) was an American politician and a Democratic member of the Kentucky House of Representatives from District 15. He took office in 1997 and was defeated for re-election in 2016 by Republican Melinda Gibbons Prunty.

Yonts died from COVID-19 at a hospital in Owensboro, Kentucky, on August 20, 2021, aged 72.

== Education ==
Yonts earned his BS from Murray State University, and his JD from the University of Kentucky College of Law.

== Elections ==
- 1994 Yonts ran in the District 15 1994 Democratic Primary, but lost to Charles Nelson, who went on to win the November 8, 1994 General election.
- 1996 When Representative Nelson left the Legislature and left the seat open, Yonts won the six-way 1996 Democratic Primary and won the November 5, 1996 General election against Republican nominee Marshall Prunty.
- 1998 Yonts was unopposed for both the 1998 Democratic Primary and the November 3, 1998 General election.
- 2000 Yonts was unopposed for both the 2000 Democratic Primary and the November 7, 2000 General election, winning with 9,448 votes.
- 2002 Yonts was unopposed for both the 2002 Democratic Primary and the November 5, 2002 General election, winning with 8,348 votes.
- 2004 Yonts was unopposed for both the 2004 Democratic Primary and the November 2, 2004 General election, winning with 10,259 votes.
- 2006 Yonts unopposed for the 2006 Democratic Primary and won the November 7, 2006 General election with 9,315 votes (71.6%) against Republican nominee Matthew Oates.
- 2008 Yonts was challenged in the 2008 Democratic Primary, winning with 5,805 votes (69.4%) and was unopposed for the November 4, 2008 General election, winning with 12,275 votes.
- 2010 Yonts was unopposed for both the May 18, 2010 Democratic Primary and the November 2, 2010 General election, winning with 8,288 votes.
- 2012 Yonts and returning 1996 Republican opponent Marshall Prunty were both unopposed for their May 22, 2012 primaries, setting up a rematch; Yonts won the November 6, 2012 General election with 8,696 votes (56.0%) against Prunty.
- 2016 Yonts was defeated in the general election by Melinda Gibbons Prunty (wife of Marshall Prunty), who carried 57.1% of the vote.
