= Daniel Fister =

American politician

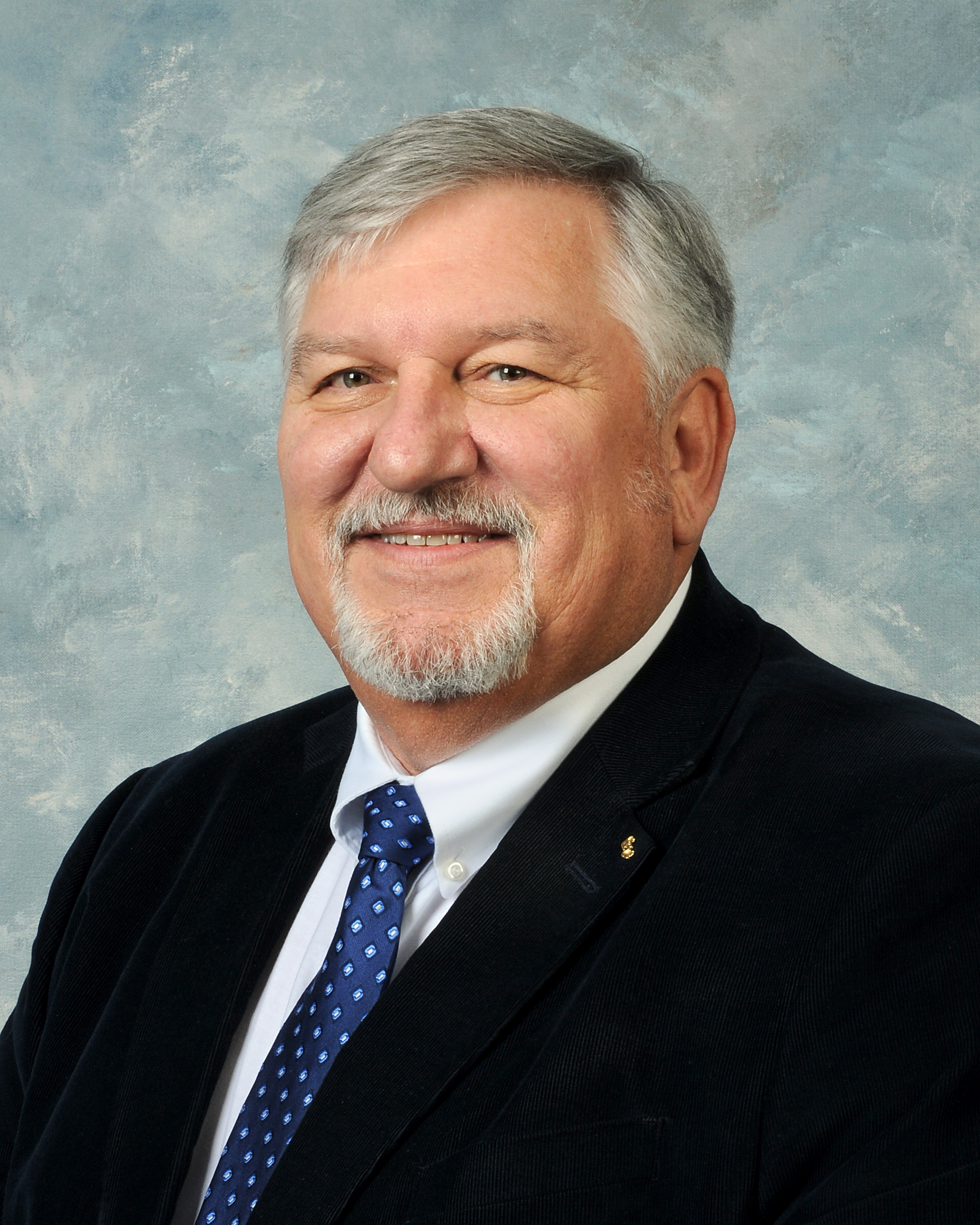

Member of the Kentucky House of Representatives from the 56th district
- Incumbent
- Assumed office January 1, 2021
- Preceded by: Joe Graviss

Personal details
- Born: July 30, 1958 (age 68) Lexington, Kentucky, U.S.
- Party: Republican
- Spouse: Vickie Kain Fister
- Children: 2
- Education: Eastern Kentucky University (BA)
- Committees: Agriculture (Vice Chair); Licensing, Occupations, & Administrative Regulations; Small Business & Information Technology

Daniel Alf Fister (born July 30, 1958) is an American politician and Republican member of the Kentucky House of Representatives from Kentucky's 56th House district since January 2021. His district is composed of Woodford County as well as parts of Franklin and Jessamine counties.

== Background ==
Fister was born the eldest of six children and was raised on his family's farm in northern Fayette County. He graduated from Lexington Catholic High School before attending the University of Kentucky to study agricultural production. He went on to study police administration and accounting at Eastern Kentucky University before earning a Bachelor of Arts in the latter.

During high school, Fister was a tenant tobacco farmer for his father. Following his graduation from Eastern, he opened his own small construction contracting company which he owned and operated for 34 years. Fister also served as a deputy jailer and deputy clerk for Fayette County. Today, Fister is employed as a property manager and farmer.

== Political career ==
=== Leadership ===
Fister currently is a member of the Central Kentucky Right to Life board of directors. He also served as chairman of the Woodford County Republican Party from 2016 to 2022.

=== Elections ===
- 2016 Fister was unopposed in the 2016 Republican primary and was defeated in the 2016 Kentucky House of Representatives election, garnering 8,525 votes (40.3%) against incumbent Democratic representative James Kay.
- 2018 Incumbent James Kay chose to run for Woodford County Judge Executive and did not seek reelection. Fister was unopposed in the 2018 Republican primary and was defeated in the 2018 Kentucky House of Representatives election, garnering 8,365 votes (42.4%) against Democratic candidate Joe Graviss.
- 2020 Incumbent Joe Graviss chose to run for Kentucky's 7th Senate district and did not seek reelection. Fister was unopposed in the 2020 Republican primary and won the 2020 Kentucky House of Representatives election with 12,487 votes (52.3%) against Democratic candidate Lamar Allen.
- 2022 Fister was unopposed in the 2022 Republican primary and won the 2022 Kentucky House of Representatives election with 10,284 votes (56.1%) against Democratic candidate Grayson Vandegrift.
- 2024 Fister was unopposed in the 2024 Republican primary and won the 2024 Kentucky House of Representatives election with 13,863 votes (57.4%) against Democratic candidate Chantel Bingham.
