= Kentucky State Capitol =

Capitol building of the U.S. state of Kentucky

- U.S. National Register of Historic Places
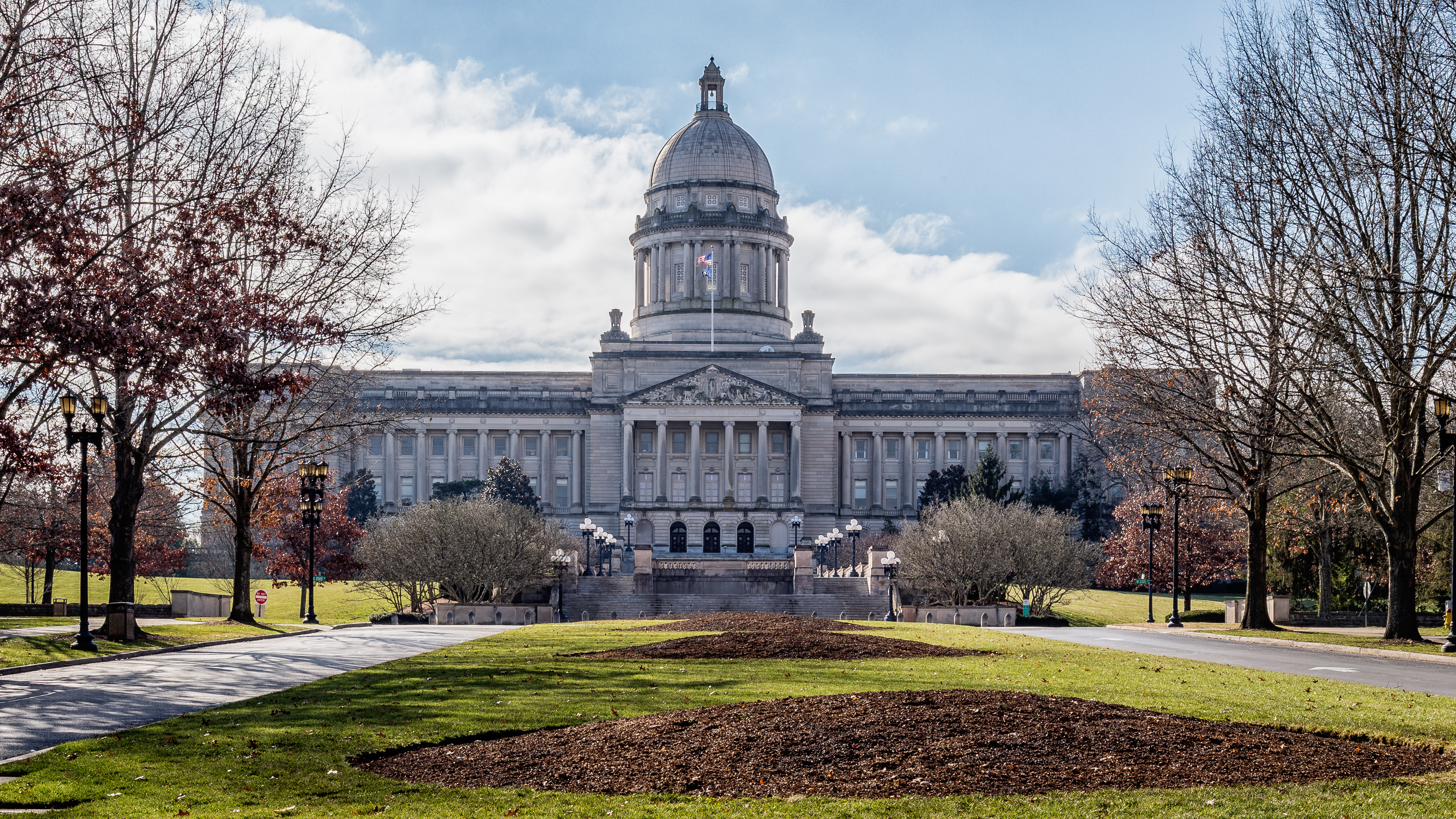
- Kentucky State Capitol Front Exterior
- Location: 700 Capital Avenue, Frankfort, Kentucky
- Coordinates: 38.1867°N 84.8753°W
- Built: 1909; 117 years ago
- Architect: Frank Mills Andrews
- Architectural style: Beaux-Arts
- NRHP reference No.: 73000804
- Added to NRHP: April 13, 1973

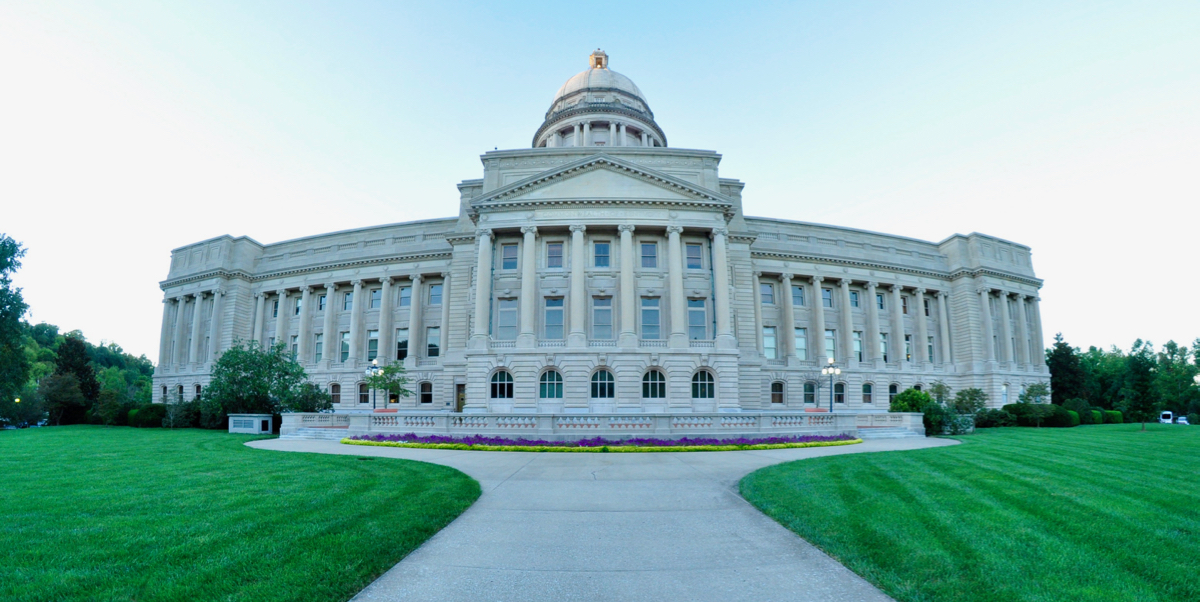
The south view of the Kentucky State Capitol in Frankfort Kentucky; photographed with an ultra wide-angle 8mm fish-eye lens

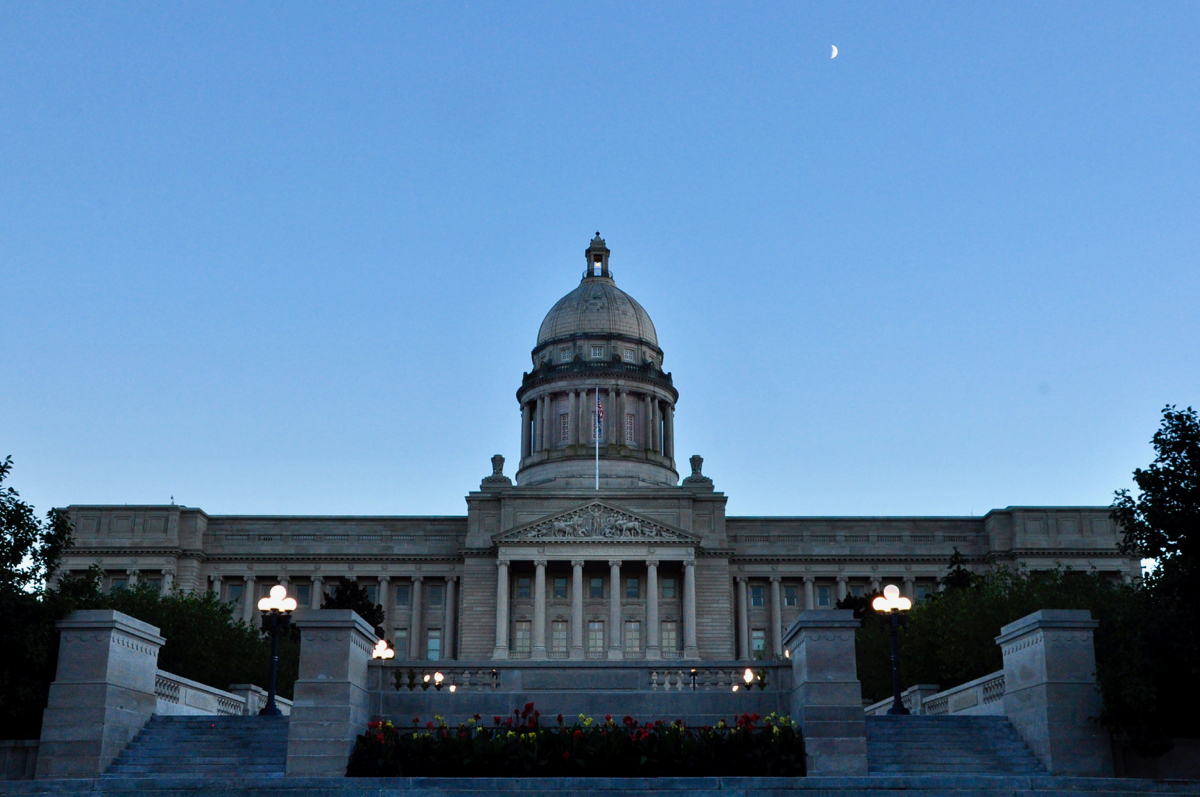
The north view of the Kentucky State Capitol in Frankfort Kentucky with the moon above

The Kentucky State Capitol is located in Frankfort and is the house of the three branches (executive, legislative, judicial) of the state government of the Commonwealth of Kentucky. The building is listed on the National Register of Historic Places.

The building is currently closed to the public due to renovations. While the surrounding grounds and monuments remain open, the structure is estimated to remain closed until 2029.

== History ==
=== Previous buildings ===
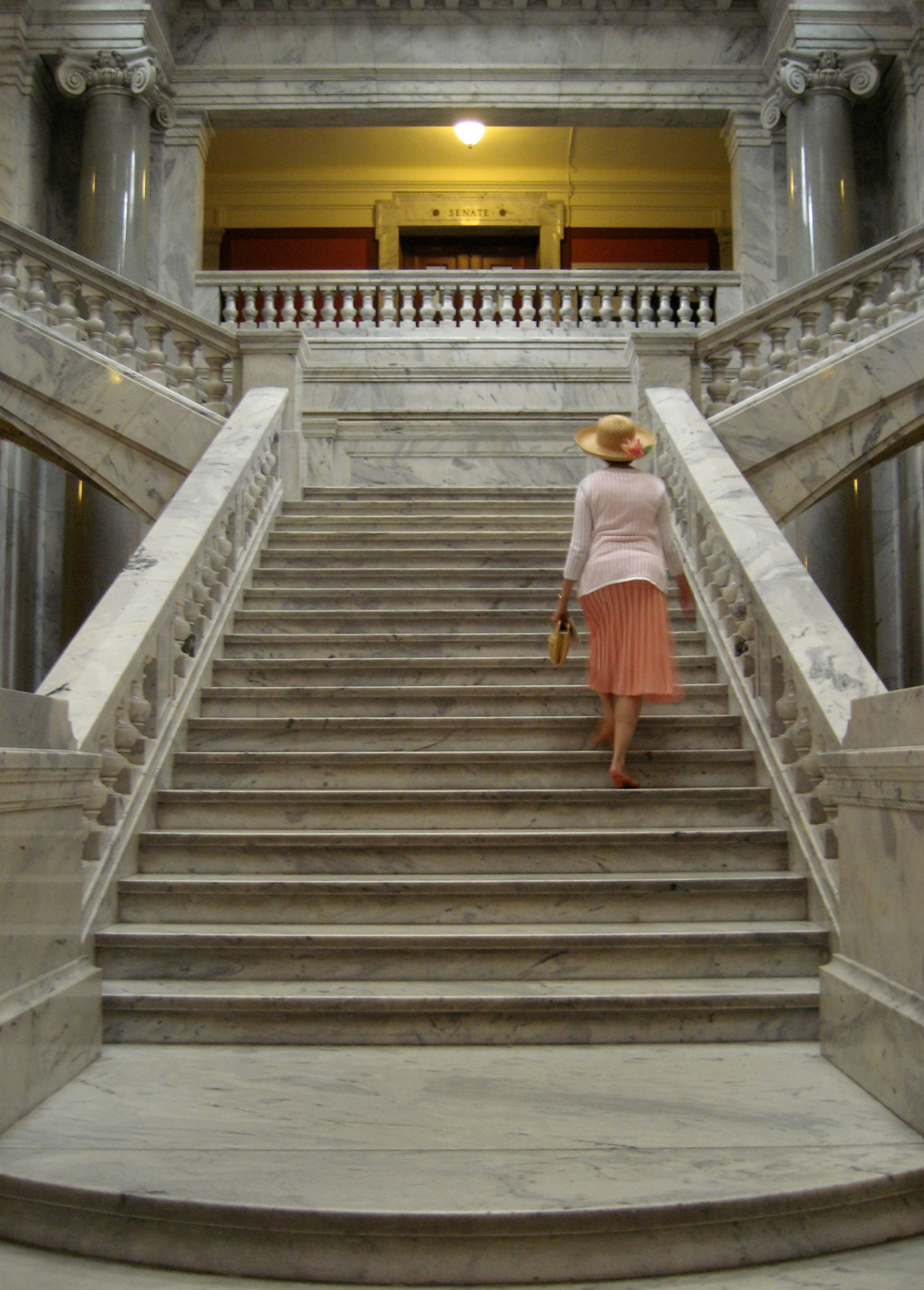
Kentucky state capitol marble staircase

From 1792 to 1830, two buildings were used as the capitol, both of which burned completely.

In 1830, another capitol was built and was used until 1910. During a bitterly contested 1899 state governor election, Democratic Party claimant William Goebel was assassinated at the capitol on his way to be inaugurated. The need for a larger building for a growing state government resulted in the replacement of that capitol building, which is now a museum operated by the Kentucky Historical Society.

=== Current 1910 building ===
In 1904, the Kentucky General Assembly chose Frankfort (rather than Lexington or Louisville) as the location for the state capital and appropriated $1 million for the construction of a permanent state capitol building, to be located in southern Frankfort. The official ground-breaking was August 14, 1905 and construction was completed in 1909 at a cost of $1,180,434.80. The building was dedicated on June 2, 1910.

The capitol was designed by Frank Mills Andrews, a distinguished and award-winning architect. He used the Beaux-Arts style and included many classical French interior designs. The staircases, for example, are replicas of those of the Opéra Garnier in Paris.

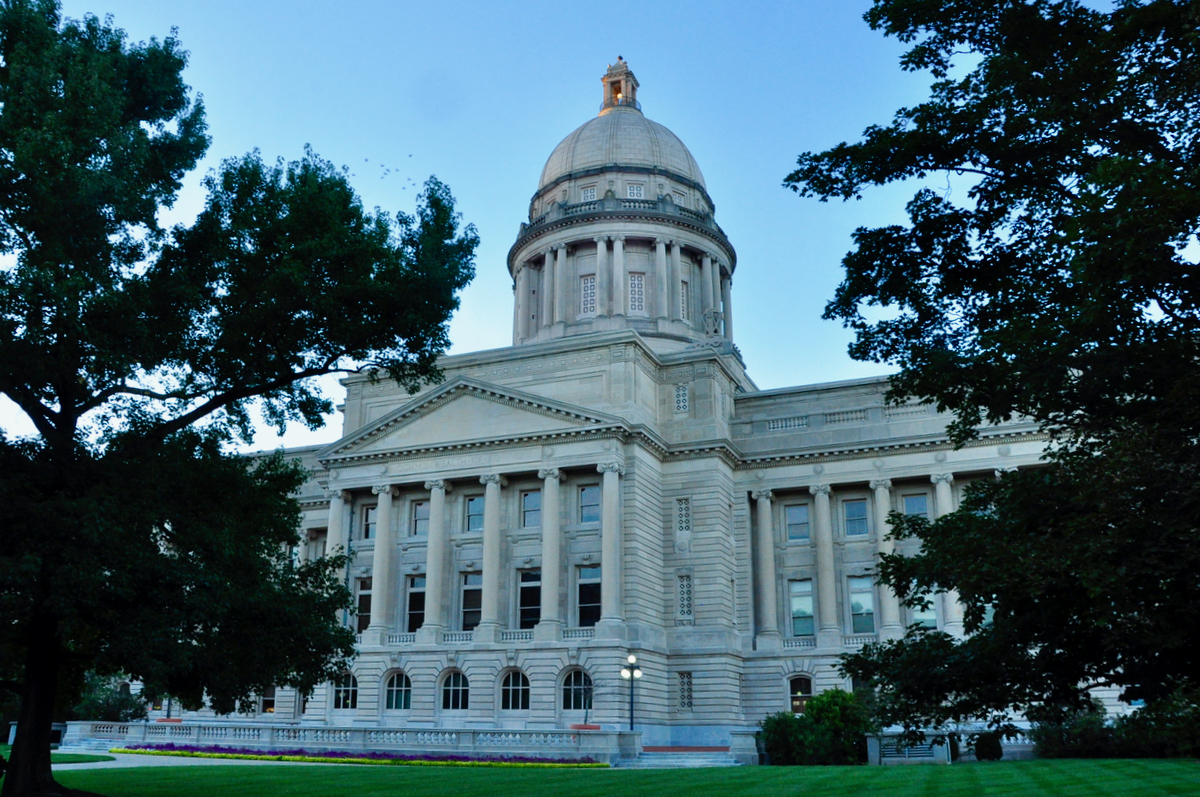
the south-east facade of the Kentucky State Capitol building located in Frankfort, Kentucky

Between 1912 and 1963, five statues of historical figures from Kentucky were erected in the rotunda of the capitol. The first was a bronze statue of Abraham Lincoln, which was donated in 1912. Statues of Henry Clay and Ephraim McDowell were added in 1930. Both of these are the bronzed plaster models used for the bronze statues that represent Kentucky in the National Statuary Hall in the U.S. Capitol in Washington, D.C. In 1936, a marble statue of Jefferson Davis, president of the Confederate States of America, was placed in the rotunda. The statue of Davis was paid for by both donations and public funds, and erected under the auspices of the United Daughters of the Confederacy. The Kentucky General Assembly voted to fund a bronze statue of Alben Barkley, former Vice President of the United States, and it was added to the rotunda in 1963. Various busts of notable figures are also located throughout the building's first floor including William S. Pryor, John Sherman Cooper, Harland Sanders, and William McAnulty.

In 2018, a plaque in front of the statue of Jefferson Davis, which referred to Davis as a "patriot" and a "hero", was removed by the Kentucky Historic Properties Commission. On June 4, 2020, Governor Andy Beshear stated that he believed the statue of Davis should be removed. On June 13, 2020, the Kentucky Historic Properties Commission voted 11–1 to remove the statue from the Capitol. The Davis statue was to be moved to the Jefferson Davis Monument State Historic Site situated in Fairview, Kentucky, the birthplace of Davis.

In November 2022, a bronze statue of Nettie Depp by Amanda Matthews, Depp's great-great niece, was unveiled inside that capitol. It is the first permanent large-scale monument of a woman inside the state capitol. While Nettie's influence was not statewide, the Historic Properties Advisory Commission considered her a representative example of Kentucky women who achieved professional and personal success. The statue's unveiling occurred in November 2022.

=== 2022–2029 renovation ===
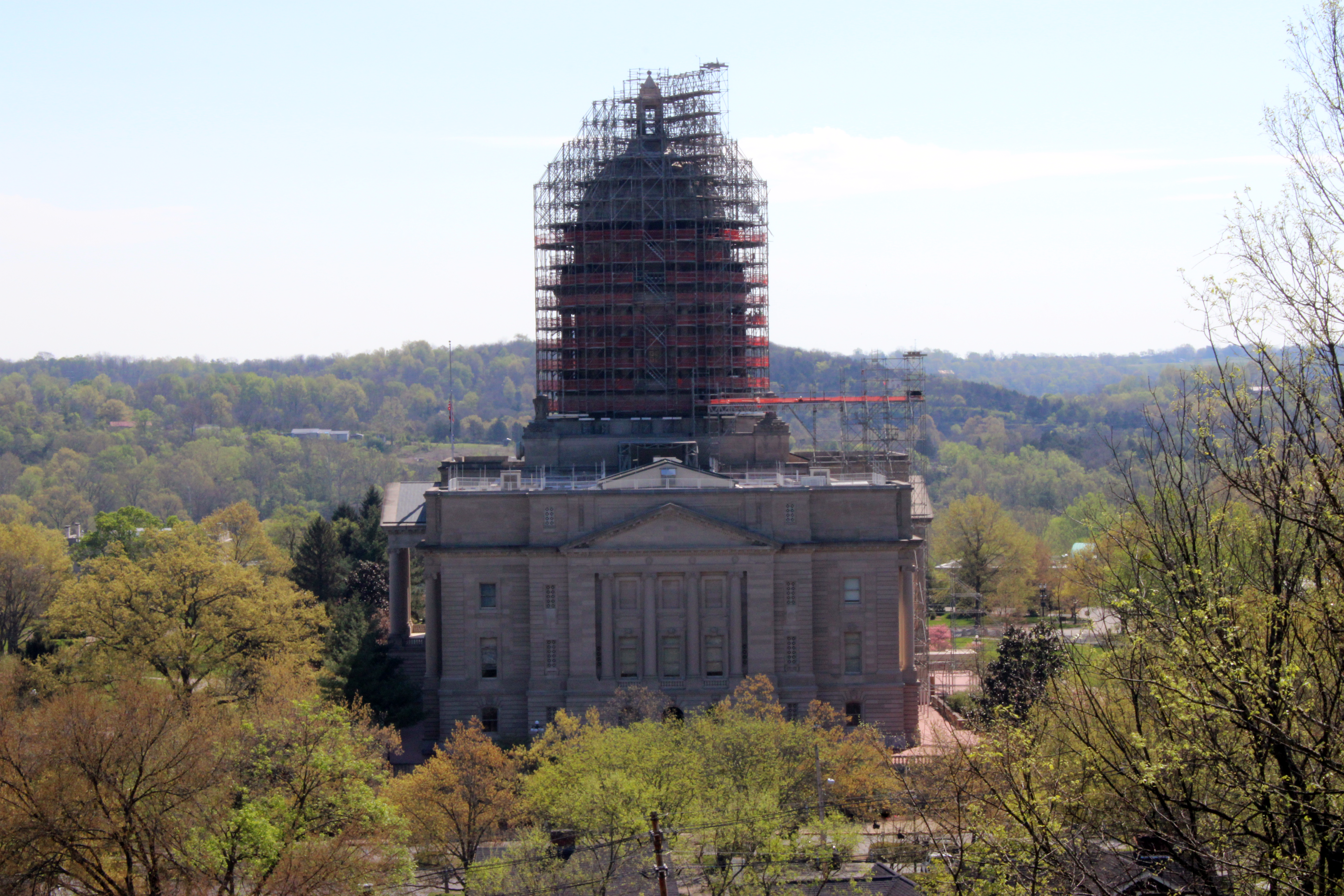
The Kentucky State Capitol Building in Frankfort, Kentucky under renovation in May 2023.

In 2022, the largest renovation in the building's history began. The project aims to address decades of deferred maintenance and modernize the capitol's structure and systems including the revitalization of public spaces, replacement of the terra cotta roof tiles, installation of modern waterproofing, removal of outdated electrical systems, addition of increased accessibility options, and the installation of new heating and cooling systems.

The building was closed to the public on August 20, 2025. The offices of the governor, lieutenant governor, attorney general, and secretary of state as well as the Kentucky Supreme Court and state law library were moved to temporary locations elsewhere in Frankfort. The 2025 Kentucky General Assembly was the last legislative session held in the structure prior to its closure, and is not estimated to hold another until January 2029. Until then, both chambers of the legislature will meet in a temporary structure constructed in the parking lot of the Capitol Annex building.

The total cost of the project is estimated to be at or above $300 million by the time of its completion.

== Layout ==
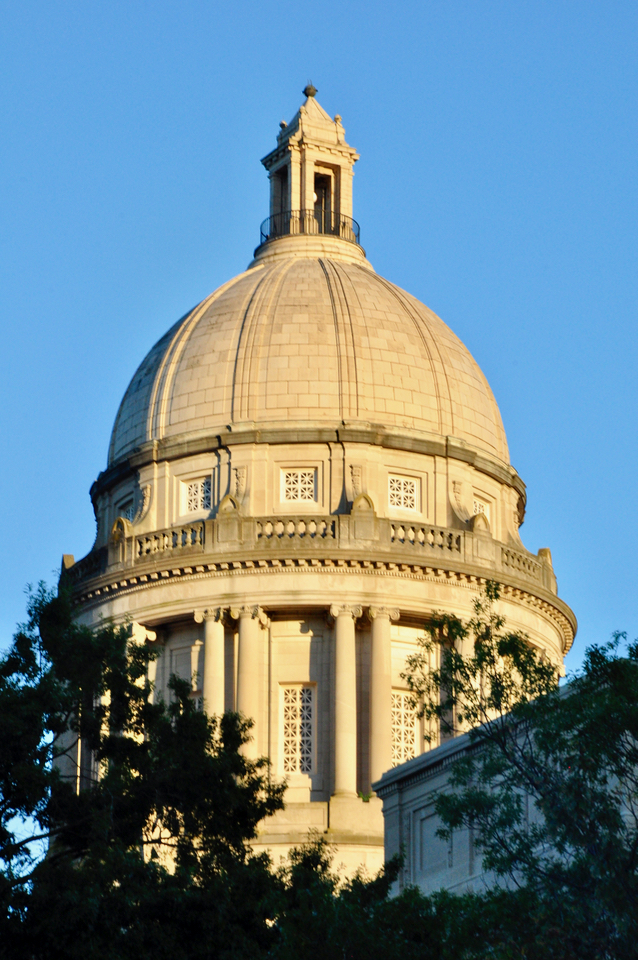
the Capitol Dome of the Kentucky State Capitol building located in Frankfort, Kentucky; photographed at dusk looking south-east

The main part of the Capitol has three floors. The first floor contains the offices of the governor (and his or her staff), lieutenant governor, secretary of state, and attorney general. It also features a rotunda with statues of famous Kentuckians and other exhibits, including Kentucky Women Remembered.

The rotunda contains four statues of notable historical figures from Kentucky. In the center of the rotunda stands a bronze statue of President Abraham Lincoln. Three more statues line the walls of the rotunda: bronze statues of Henry Clay, Vice President Alben Barkley, and Ephraim McDowell.

The second floor contains the courtroom of the state Supreme Court, as well as the chambers of the justices. The state law library is nearby. The State Reception Room is also located on the second floor.

The chambers of the House of Representatives and Senate face each other on opposite ends of the third floor. Some high-level legislative offices (such as for the Speaker of the House and the President of the Senate) are also located there.

The Capitol also has a partial fourth floor which houses the galleries of the House and Senate, as well as a few offices for legislative committee staffers.

In addition, there is a partially buried basement level with offices for clerks and maintenance personnel as well as a tunnel adjoining the structure with the neighboring Capitol Annex building. The Annex houses General Assembly committee rooms, General Assembly members offices and a cafeteria.

== People who have lain in state in the Rotunda ==
In total, 20 people have lain in state in the capitol building's rotunda:

- Rebecca Boone, wife of Daniel Boone, 1845
- Daniel Boone, explorer, 1845
- Joseph Clay Stiles Blackburn, United States Senator, 1918
- Augustus Owsley Stanley, Governor, 1958
- Col. Harland Sanders, founder of Kentucky Fried Chicken, 1980
- A.B. "Happy" Chandler, Governor and United States Senator, 1991
- Bert T. Combs, Governor, 1991
- Thelma Stovall, Lt. Governor, 1994
- Lawrence W. Wetherby, Governor, 1994
- Wilson W. Wyatt, Lt. Governor, 1996
- Mary Louise Foust, State Auditor, 1999.
- Robert F. Stephens, Chief Justice of the Kentucky Supreme Court, 2002
- Kenny Rapier, State Senator, 2002
- Edward T. "Ned" Breathitt, Governor, 2003
- Louie B. Nunn, Governor, 2004
- William E. McAnulty Jr., Justice on the Kentucky Supreme Court, 2008
- Wendell Ford, Governor and United States Senator, 2015
- Georgia Davis Powers, State Senator, 2016
- John Y. Brown Jr., Governor and business mogul, 2022
- Julian Carroll, Governor, 2023

Not included on this list is governor Martha Layne Collins, who died in November 2025. Due to the capitol's closure for renovations, Collin's lay in state and had her funeral conducted in the old state capitol building.

== Security ==
The Capitol used to be completely open during normal business hours, and local residents often used the marble hallways for exercise (the Frankfort equivalent of "mall walking"). Currently, anyone without proper state credentials must go through a metal detector. Security for the complex is provided by officers from the Facilities Security Branch of the Kentucky State Police along with specifically assigned state troopers.

== See also ==
- List of Kentucky General Assemblies
- Floral clock (Frankfort, Kentucky)
- List of state and territorial capitols in the United States
- National Register of Historic Places listings in Franklin County, Kentucky

== Gallery ==
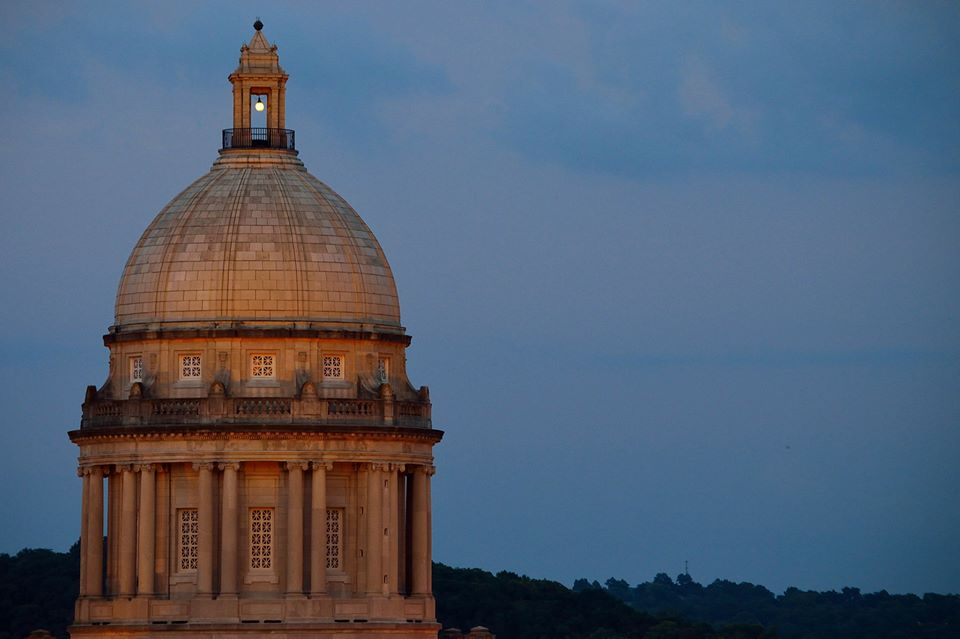
Kentucky State Capitol Dome seen from the US 60 lookout

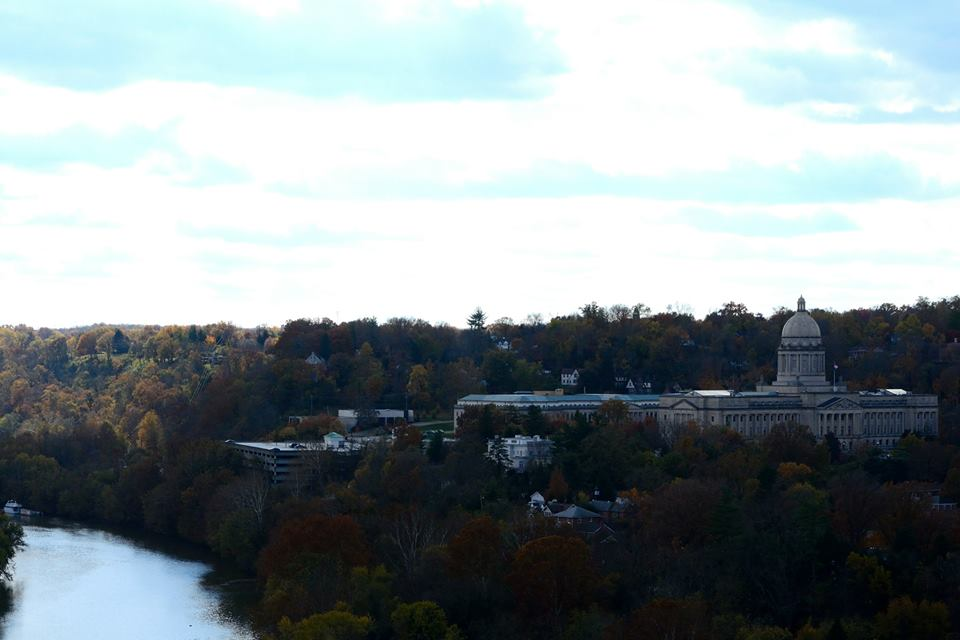
Kentucky State Capitol seen from the Daniel Boone grave site

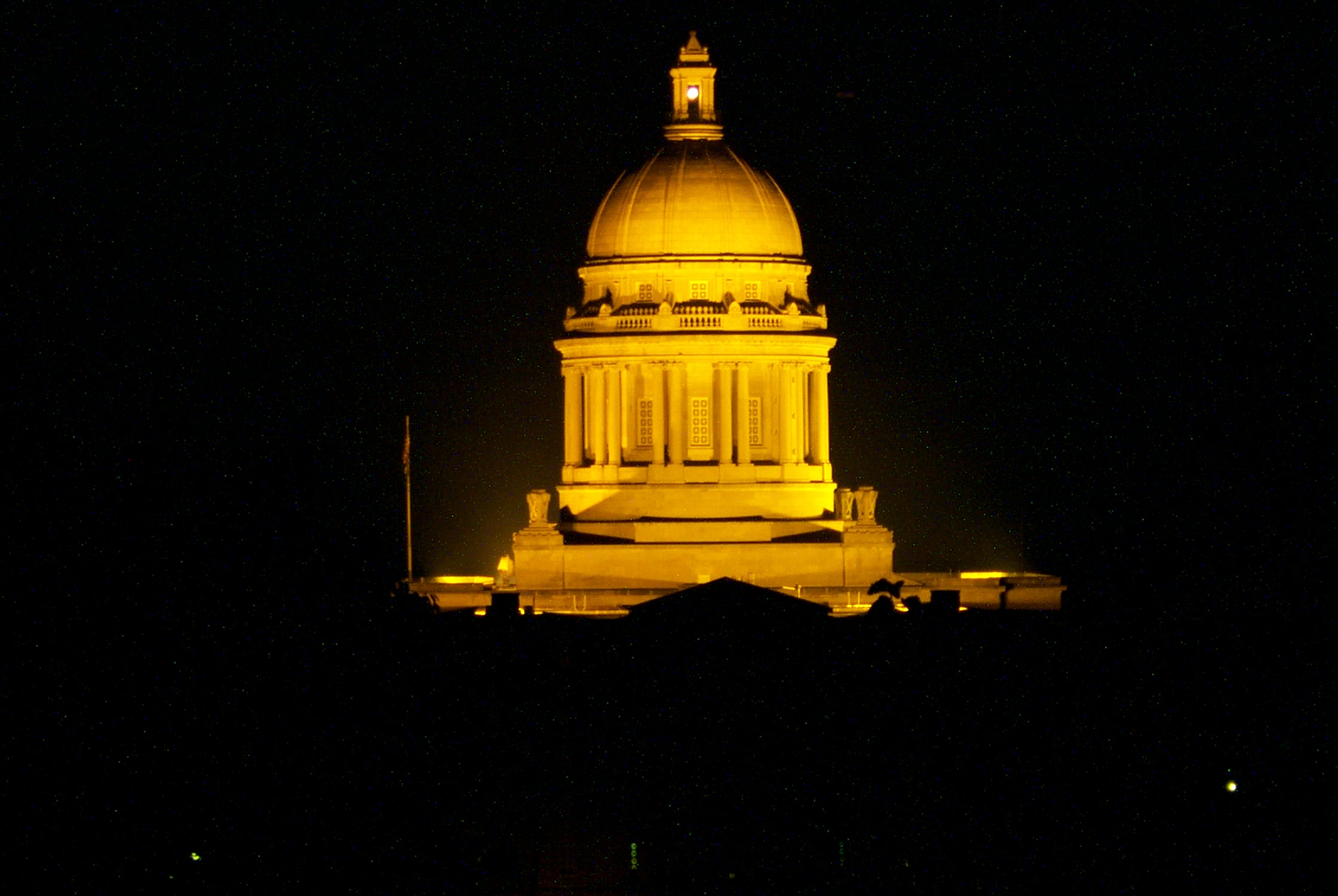
Capitol dome illuminated at night

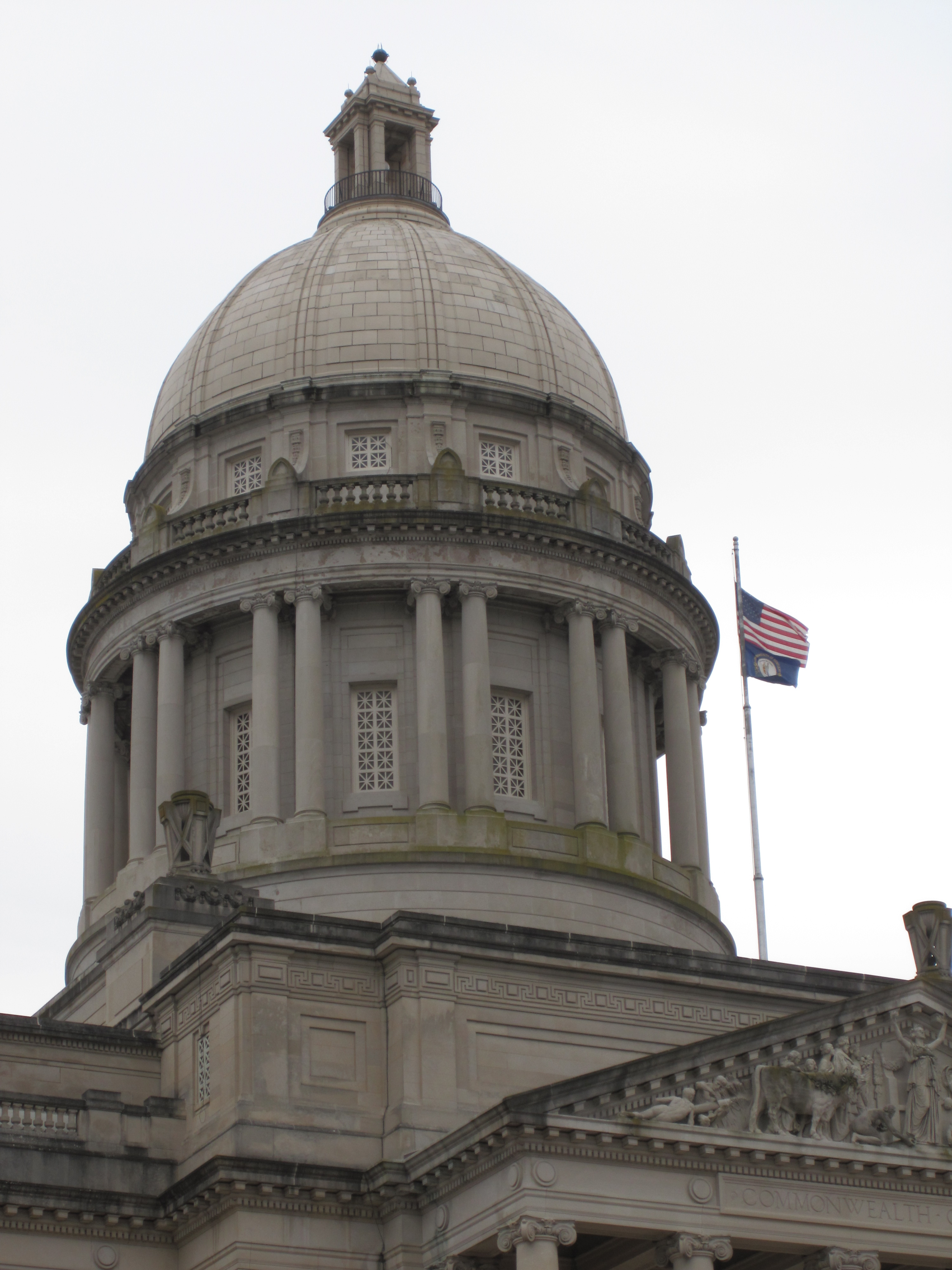
Capitol Dome, seen from outside main entrance

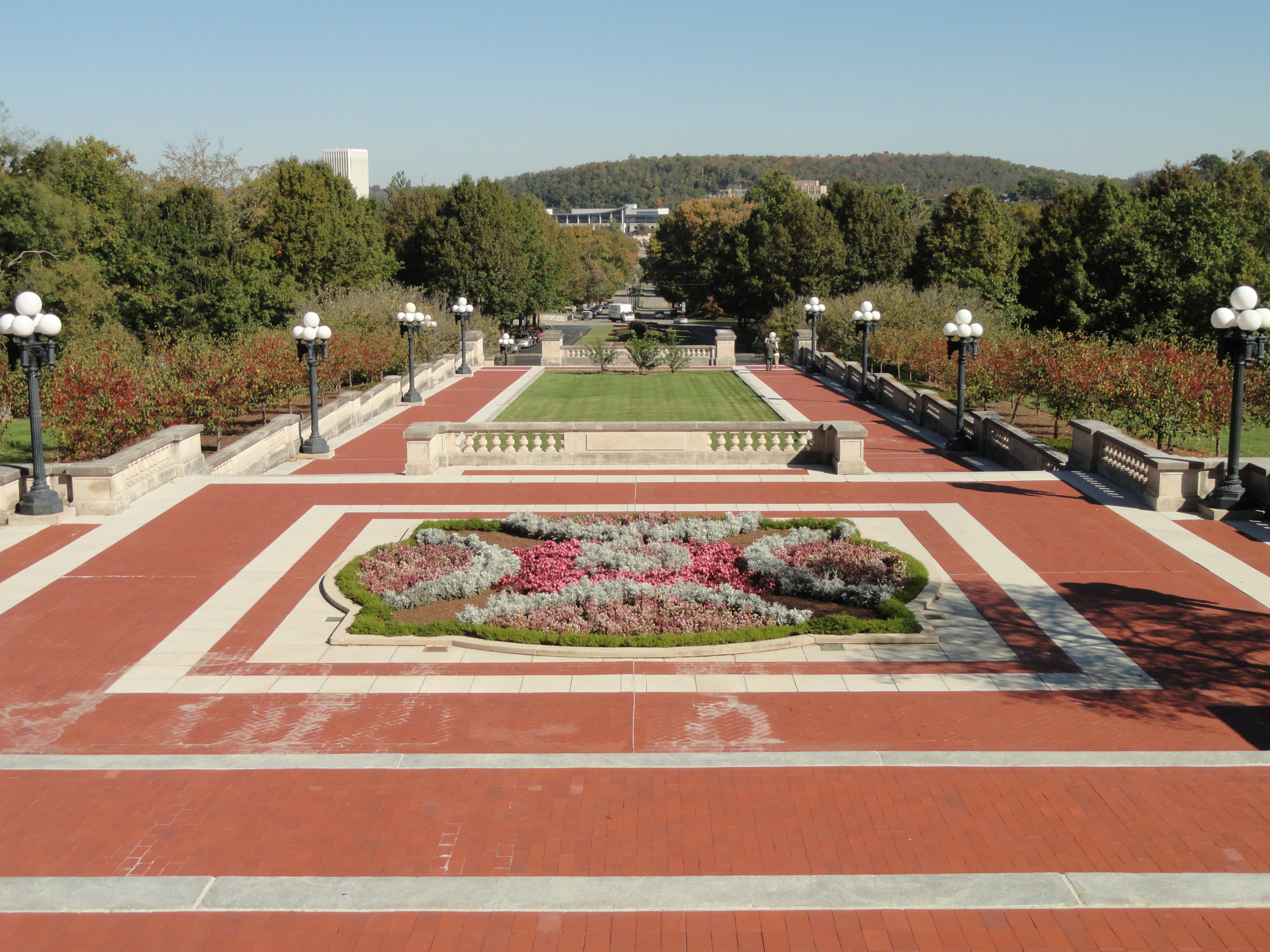
Main Entrance to the Capitol

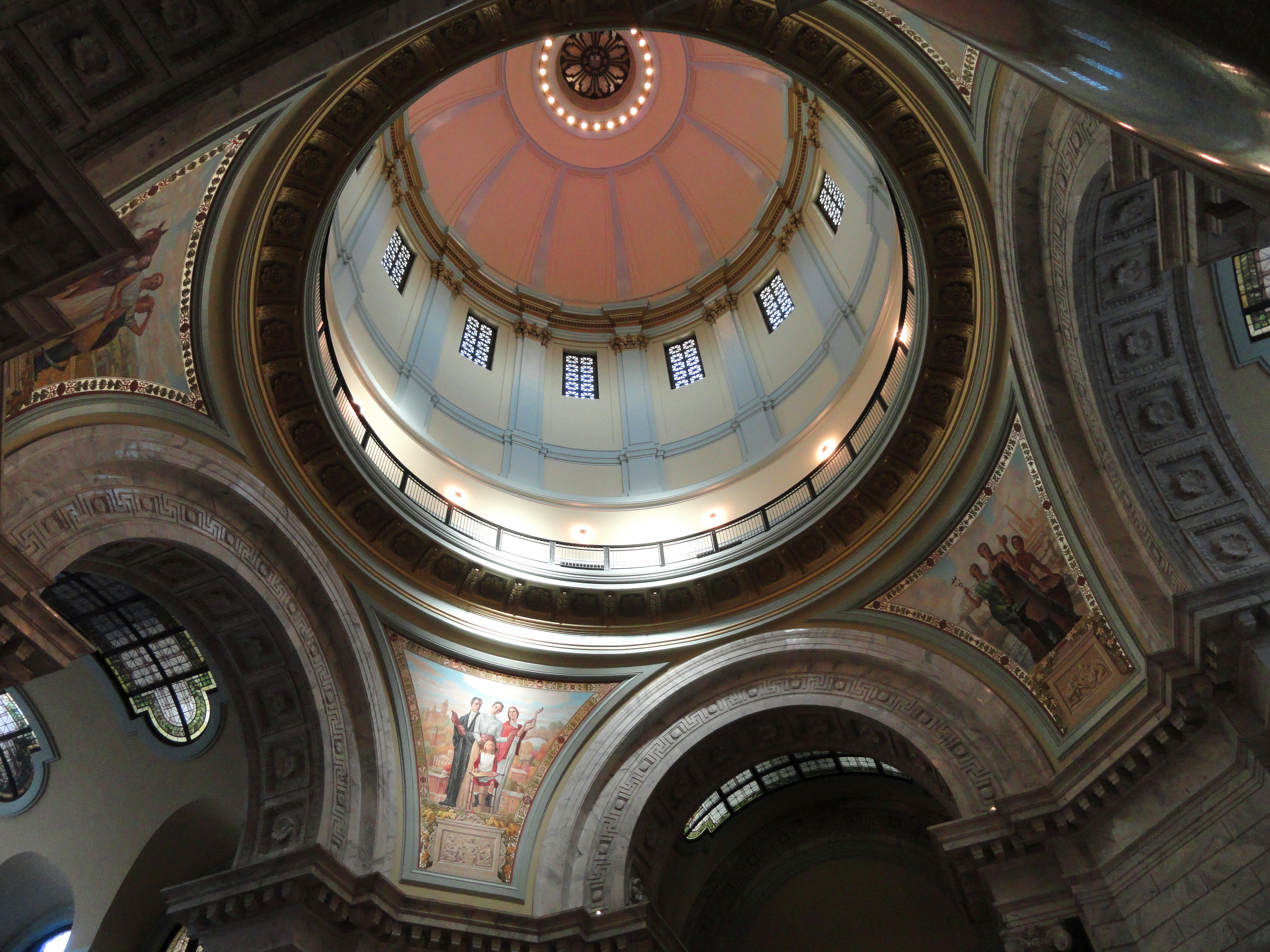
The rotunda

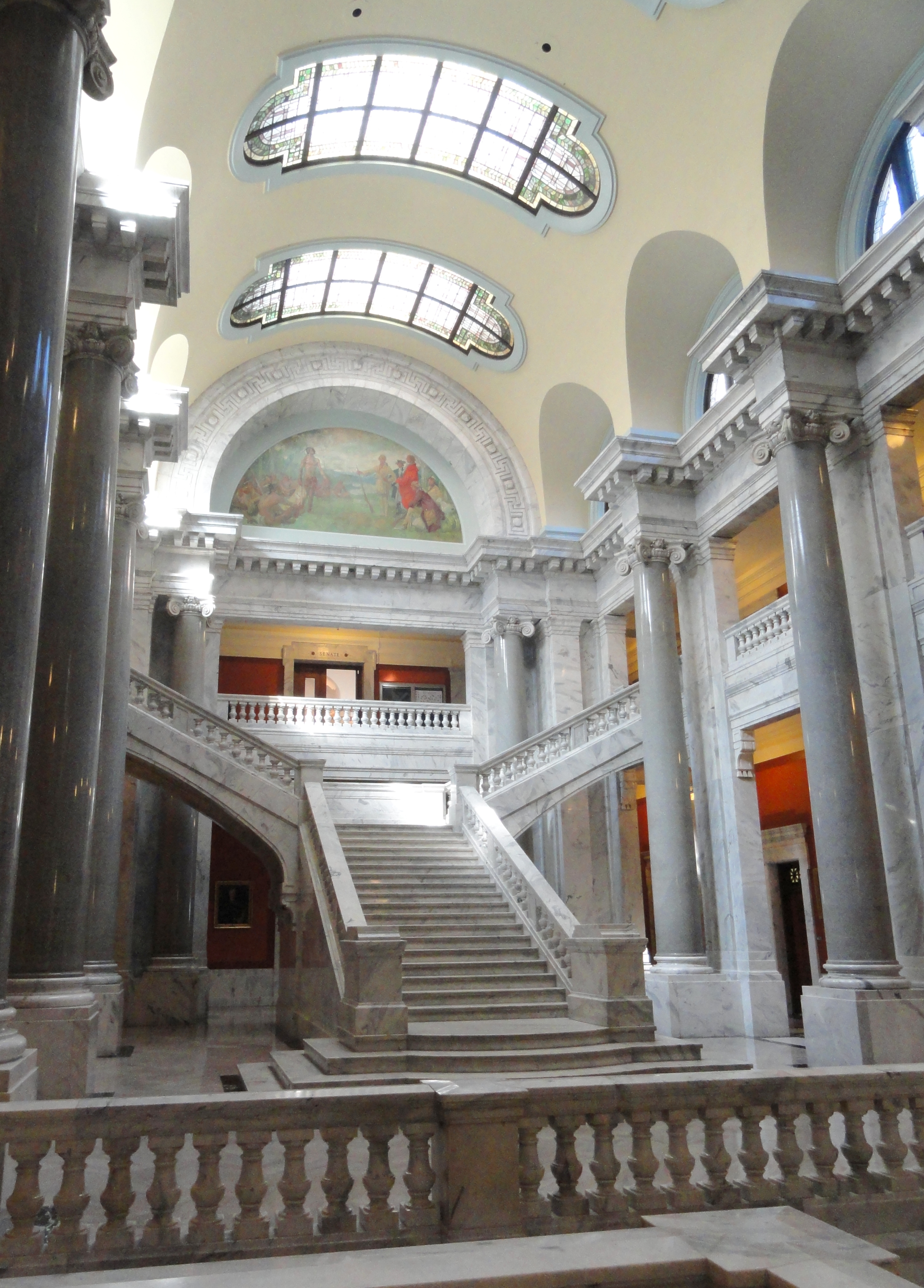
One of the marble staircases

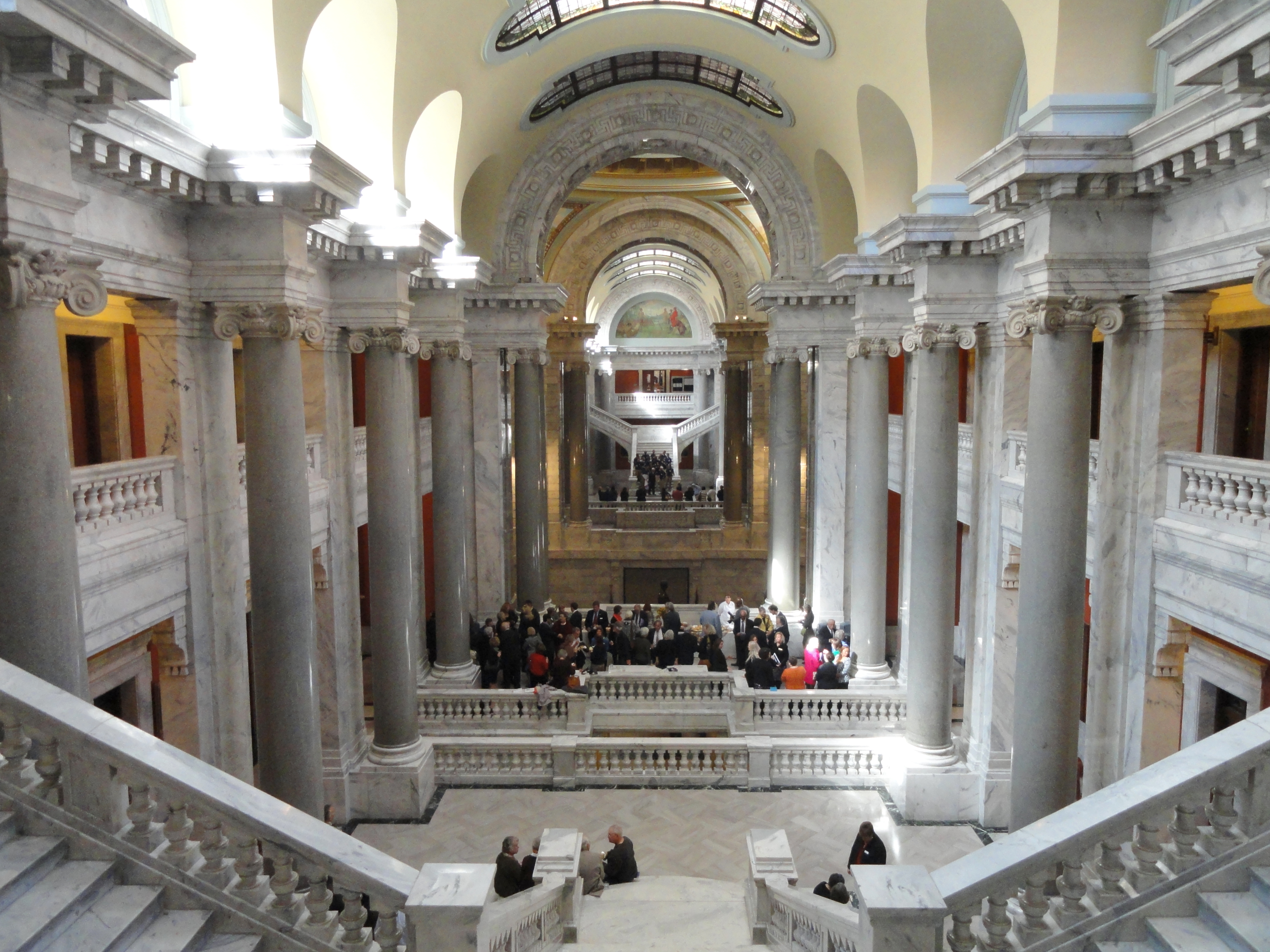
The main corridor

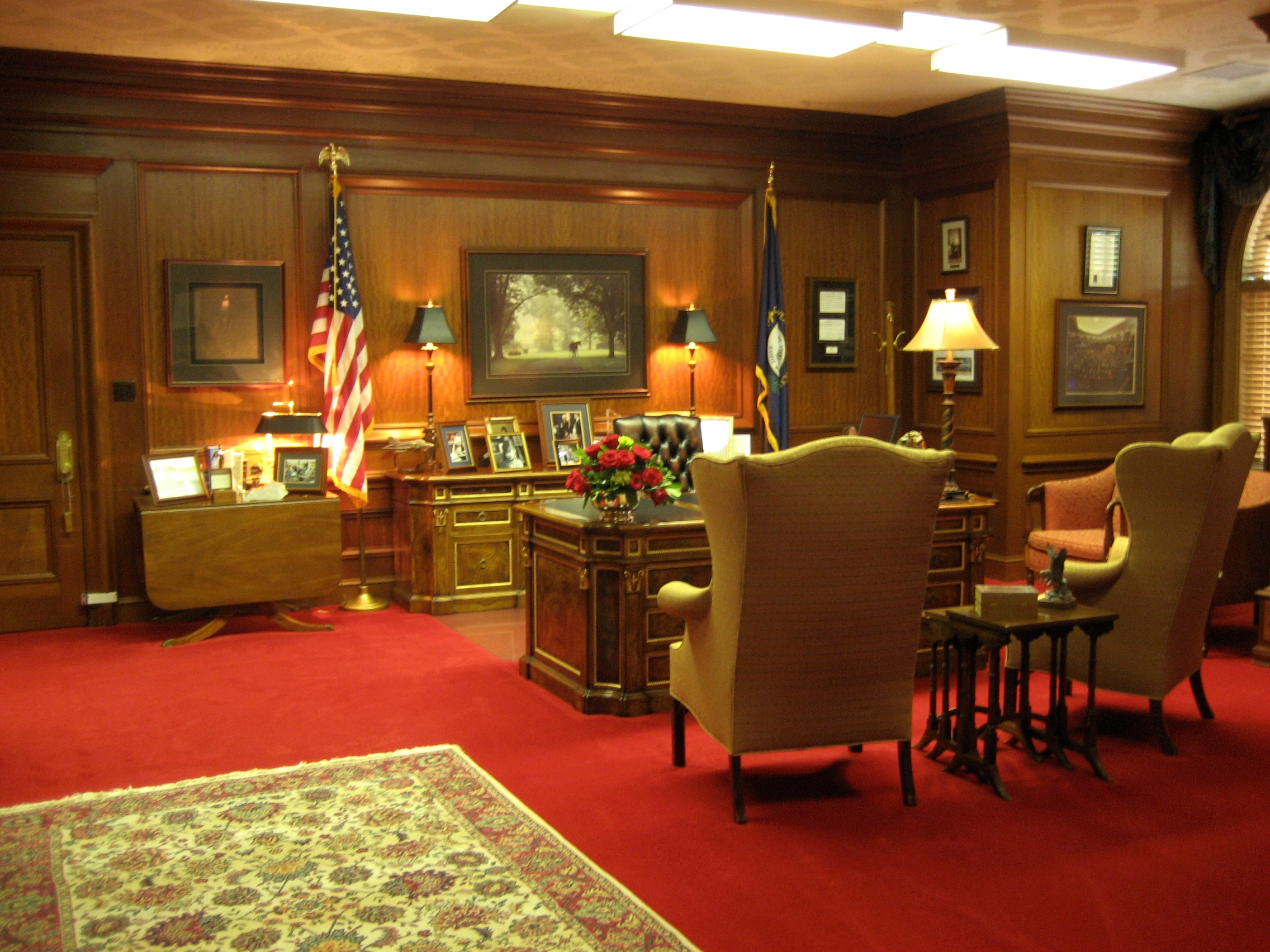
Office of the Governor of Kentucky

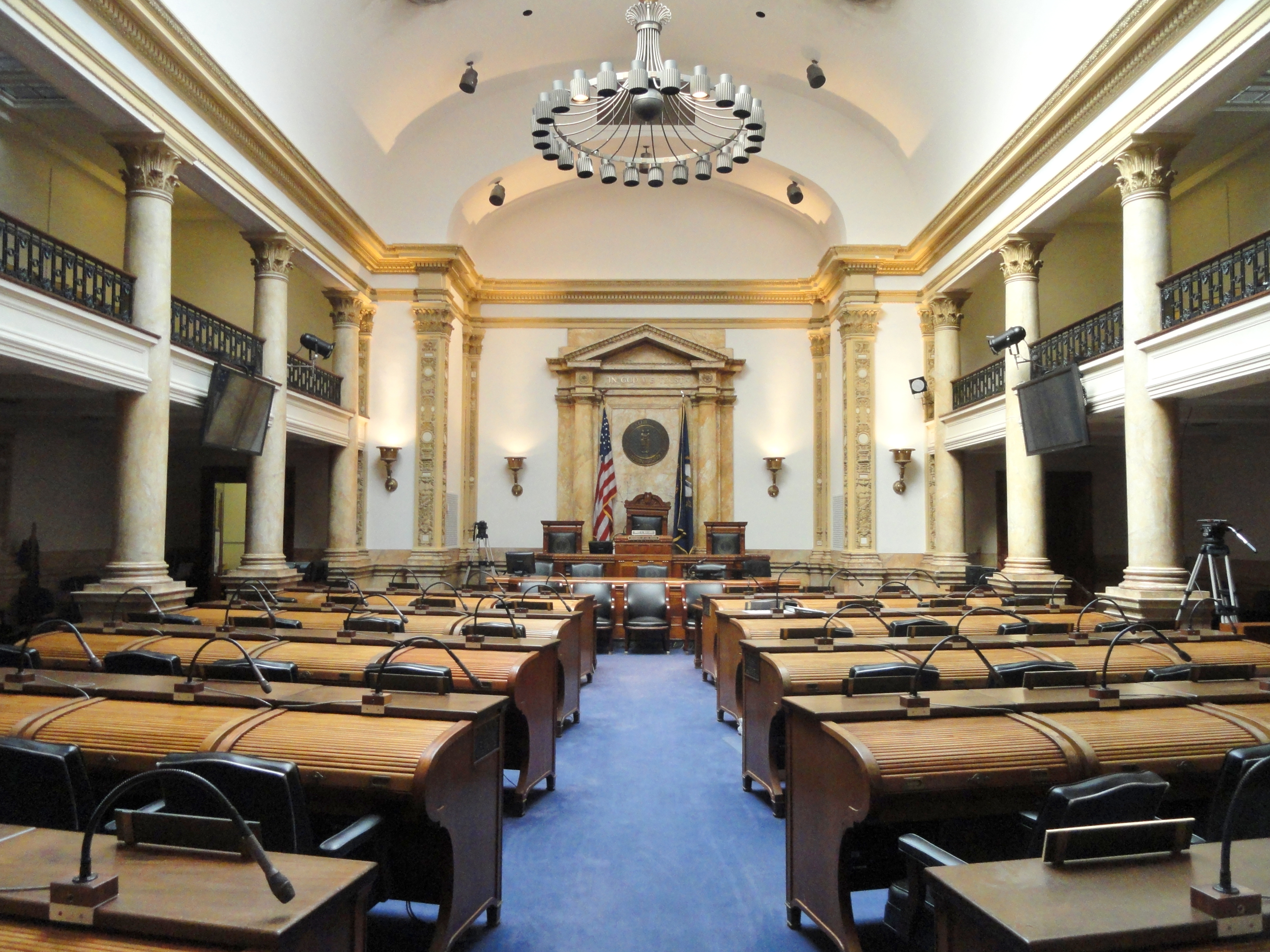
Senate Chamber

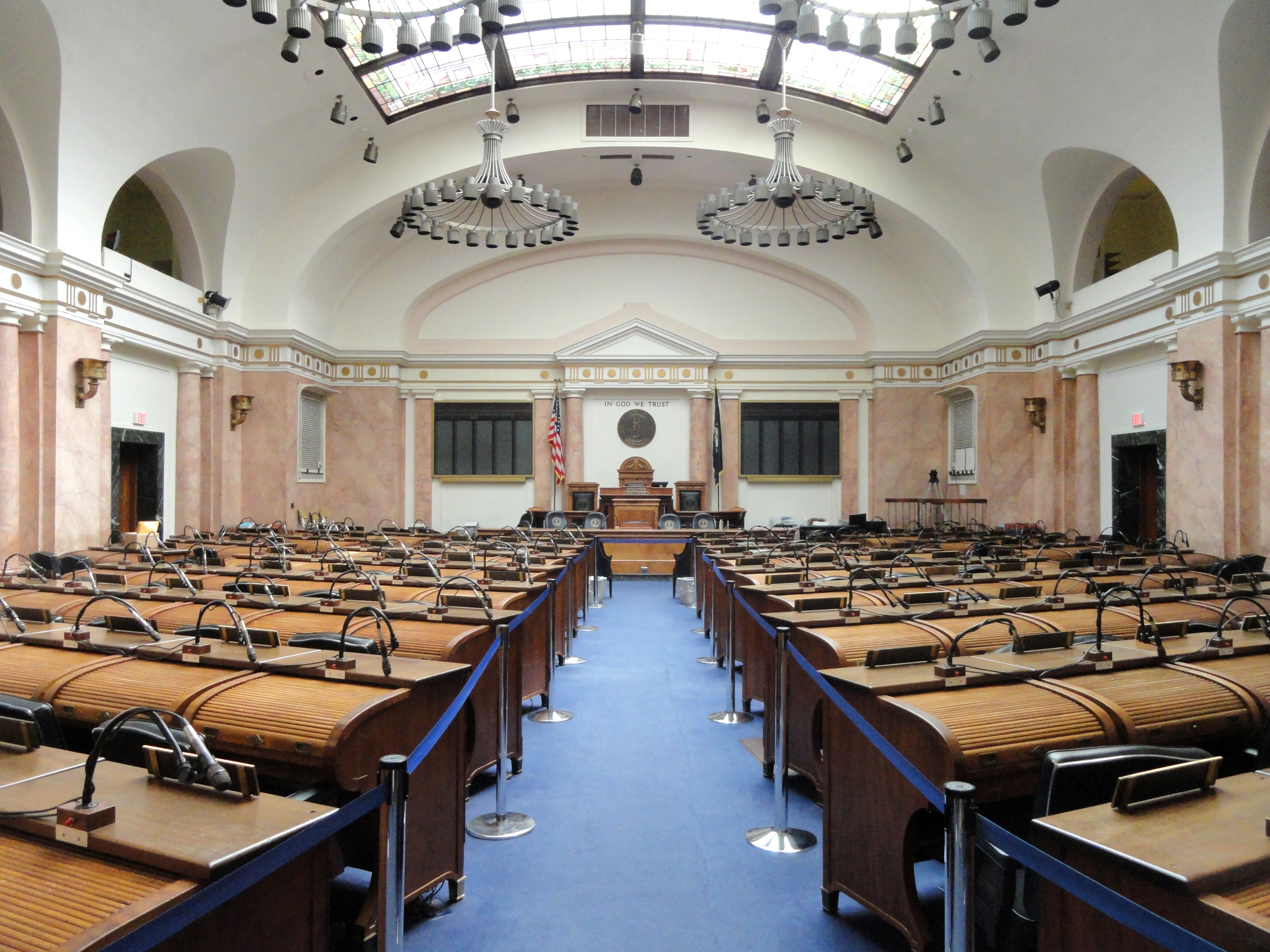
House of Representatives

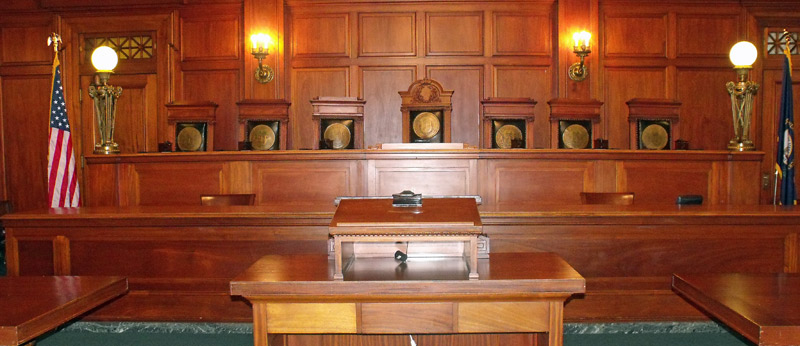
Supreme Court Chamber

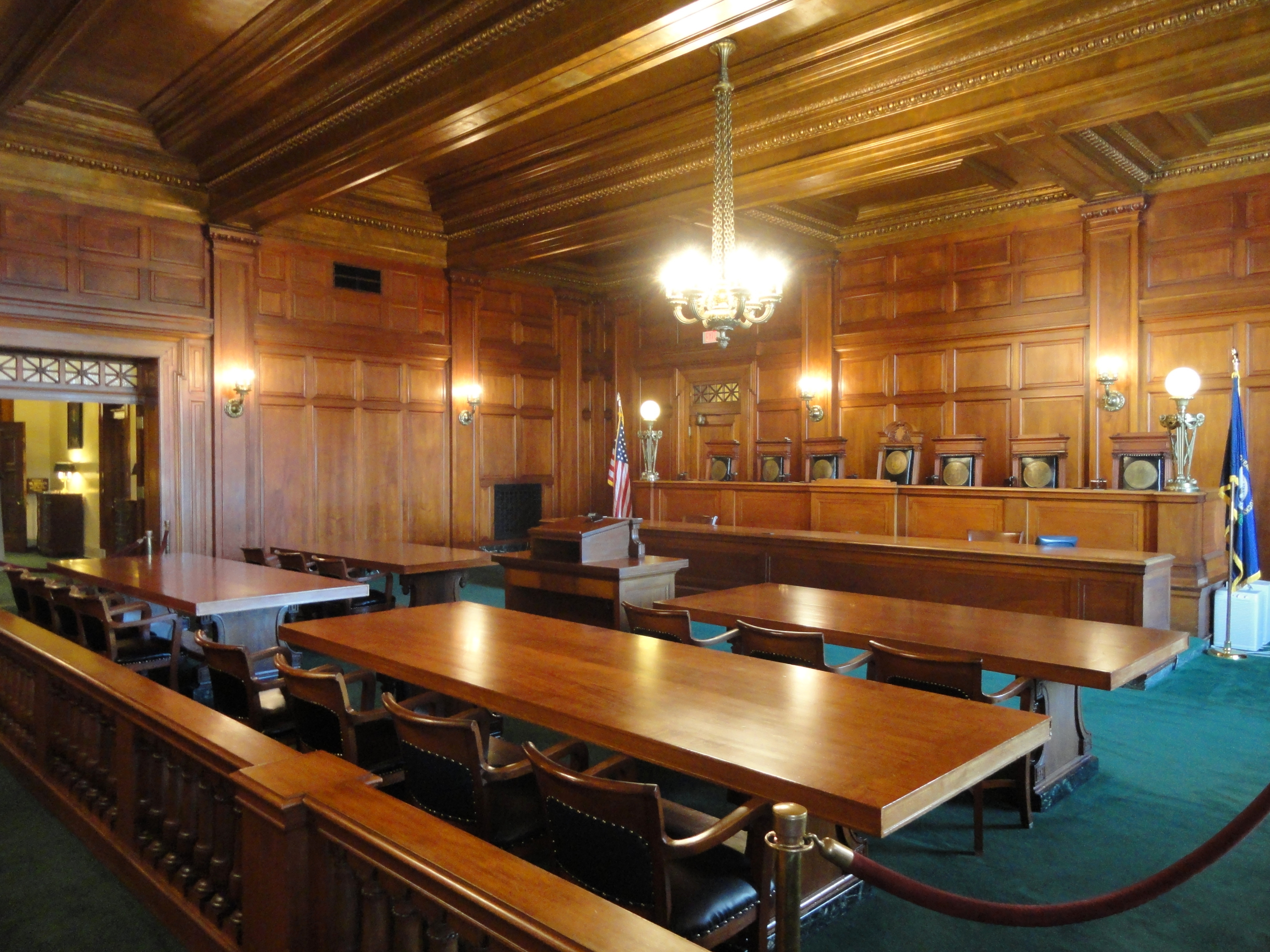
Supreme Court Chamber

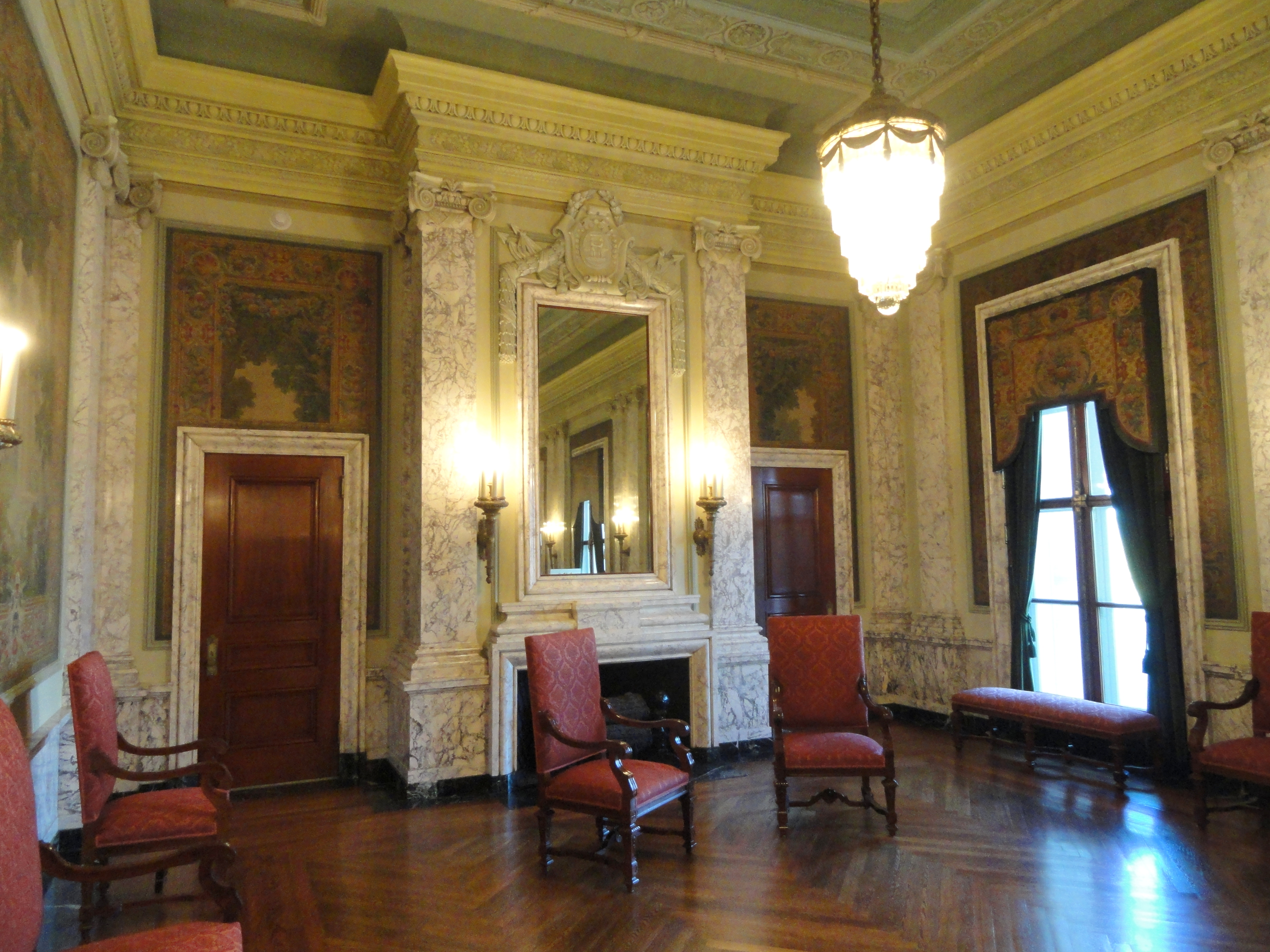
State Reception Room

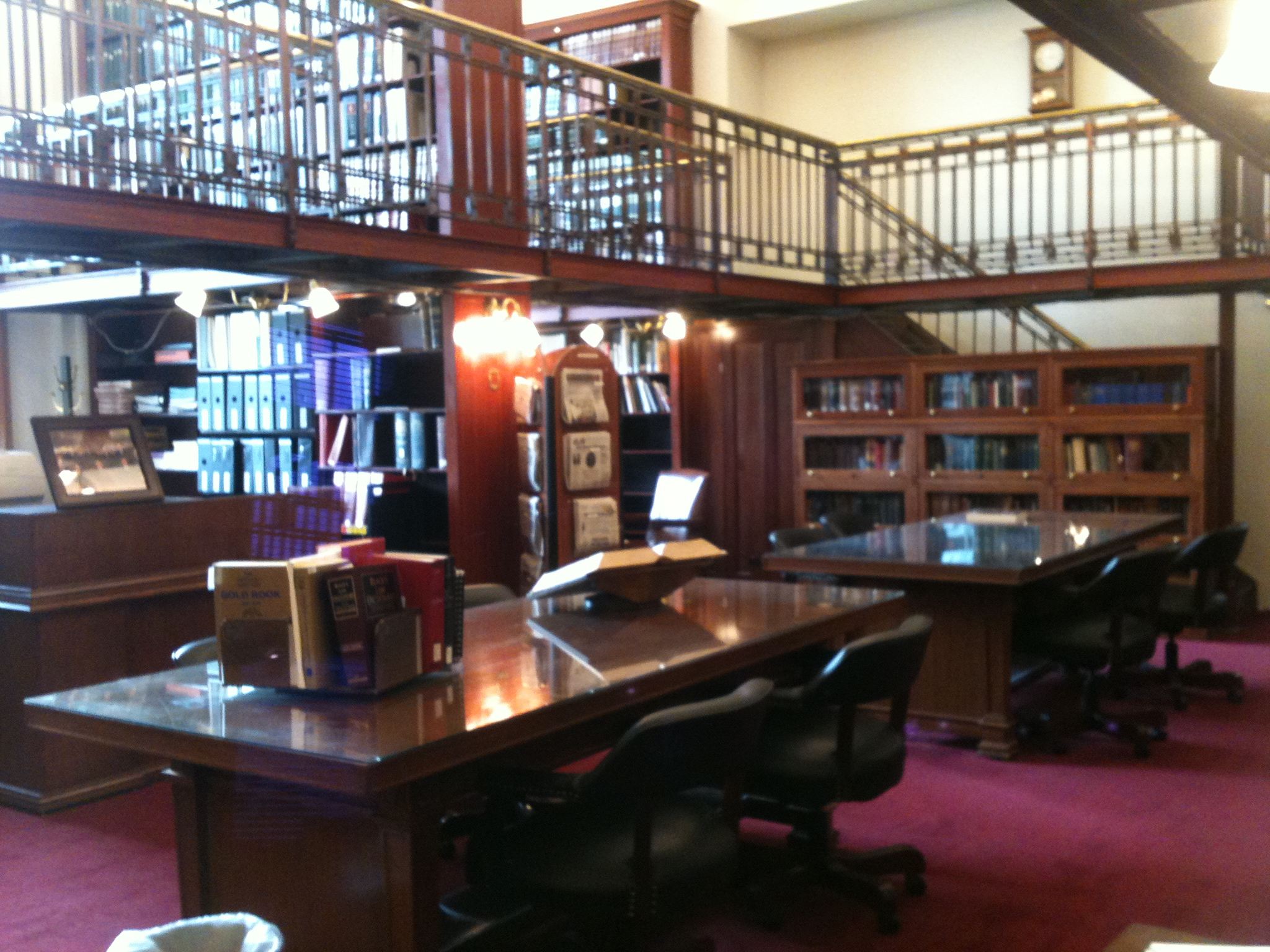
Kentucky Capitol Law Library

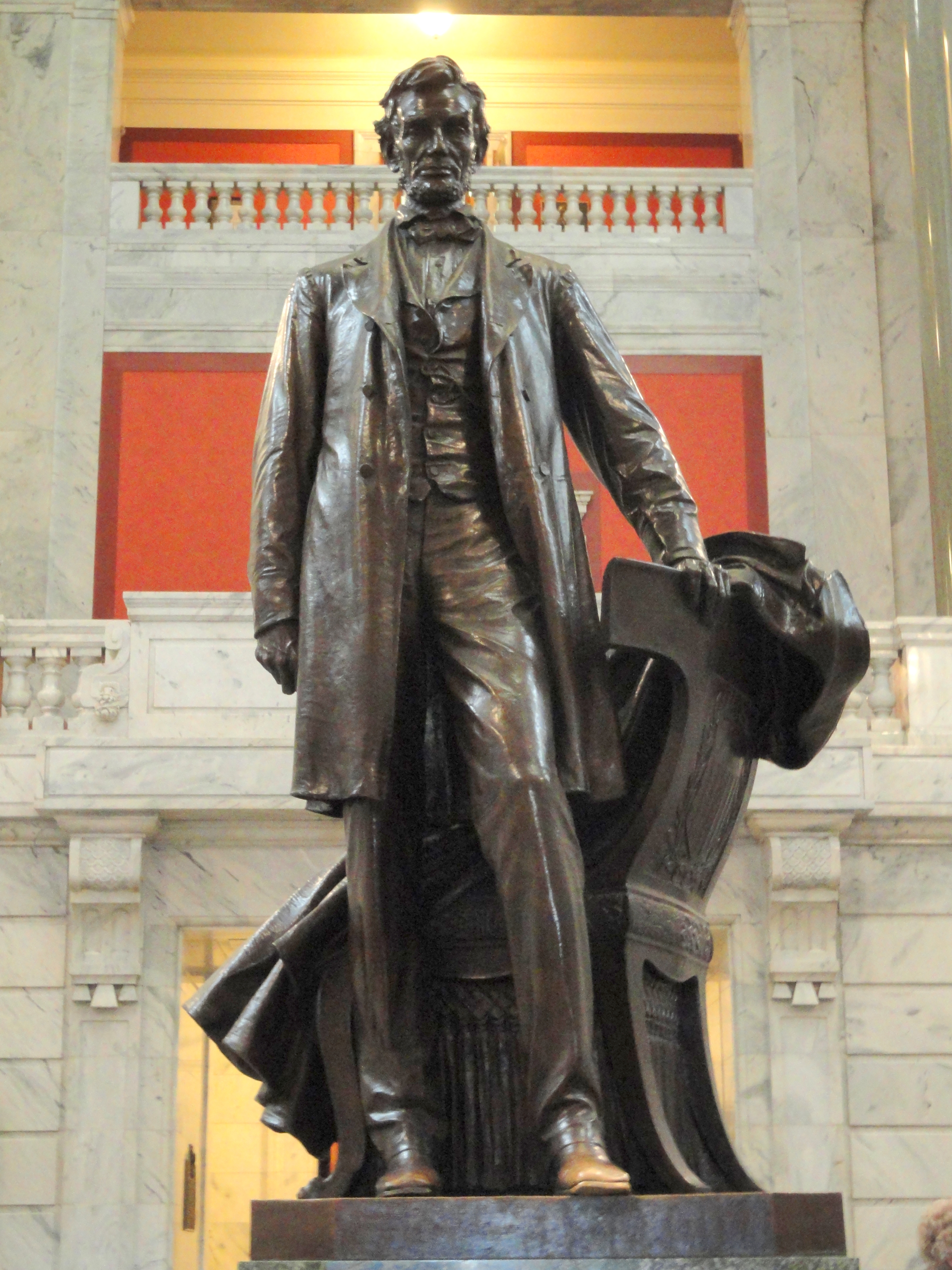
Statue of Abraham Lincoln

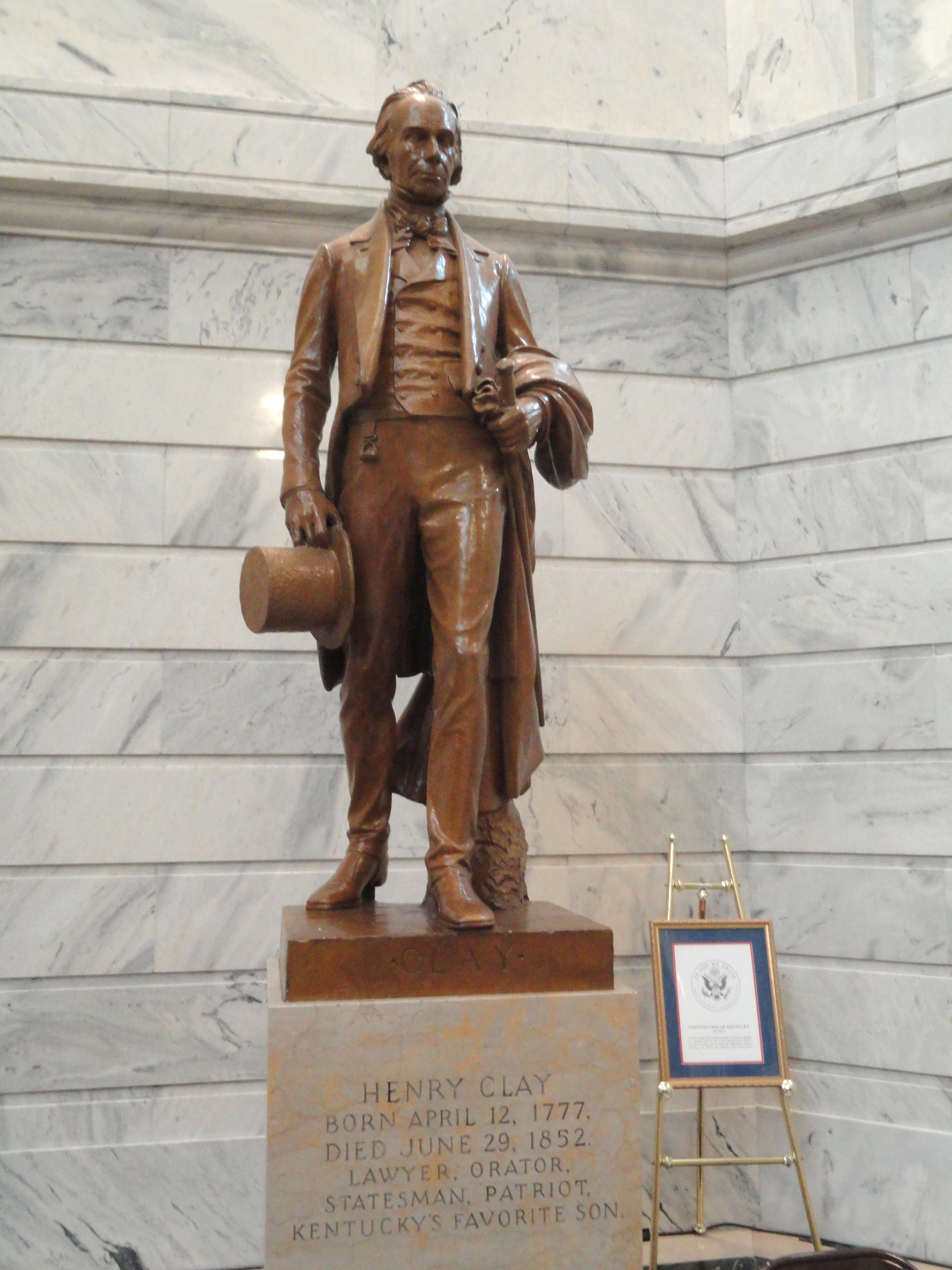
Statue of Henry Clay

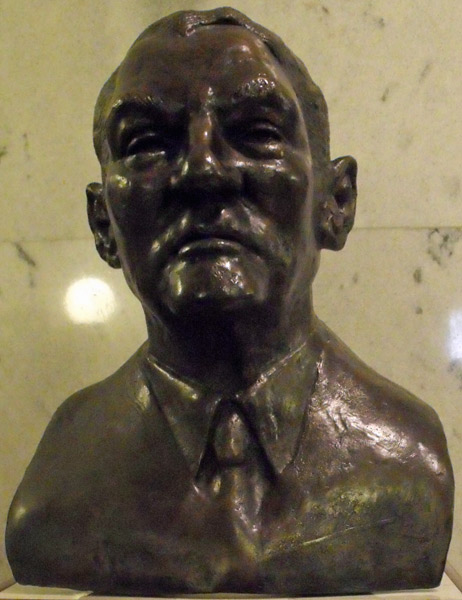
A bust of Kentucky Senator John Sherman Cooper, located in the Kentucky State Capitol

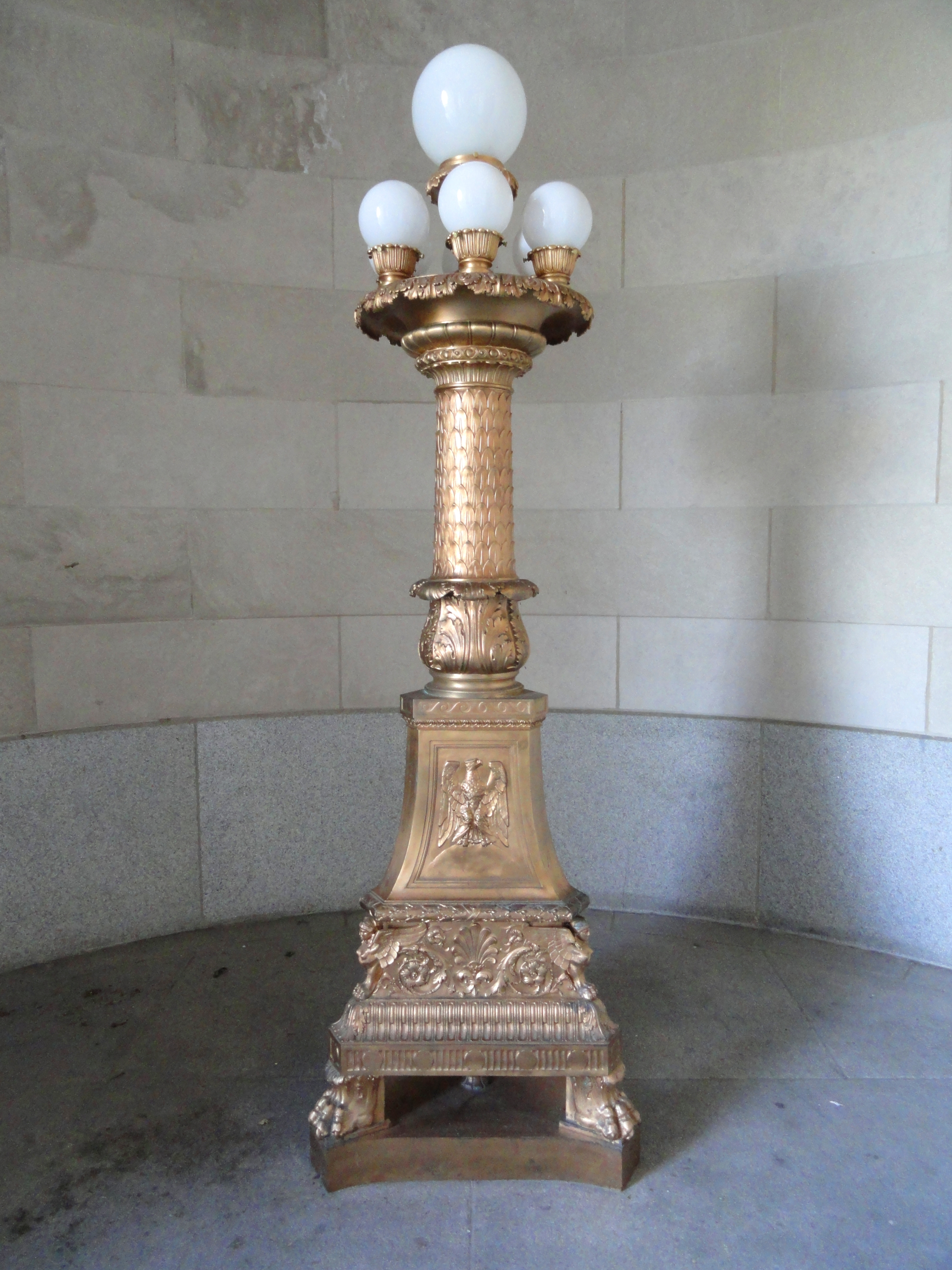
Lamp - Kentucky State Capitol

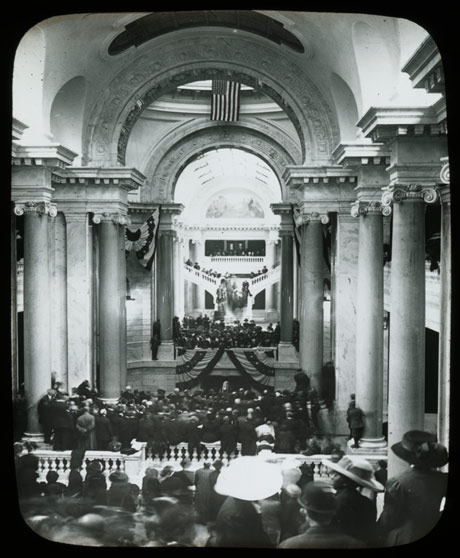
President William H. Taft addressing crowd at Kentucky State Capitol Building Rotunda

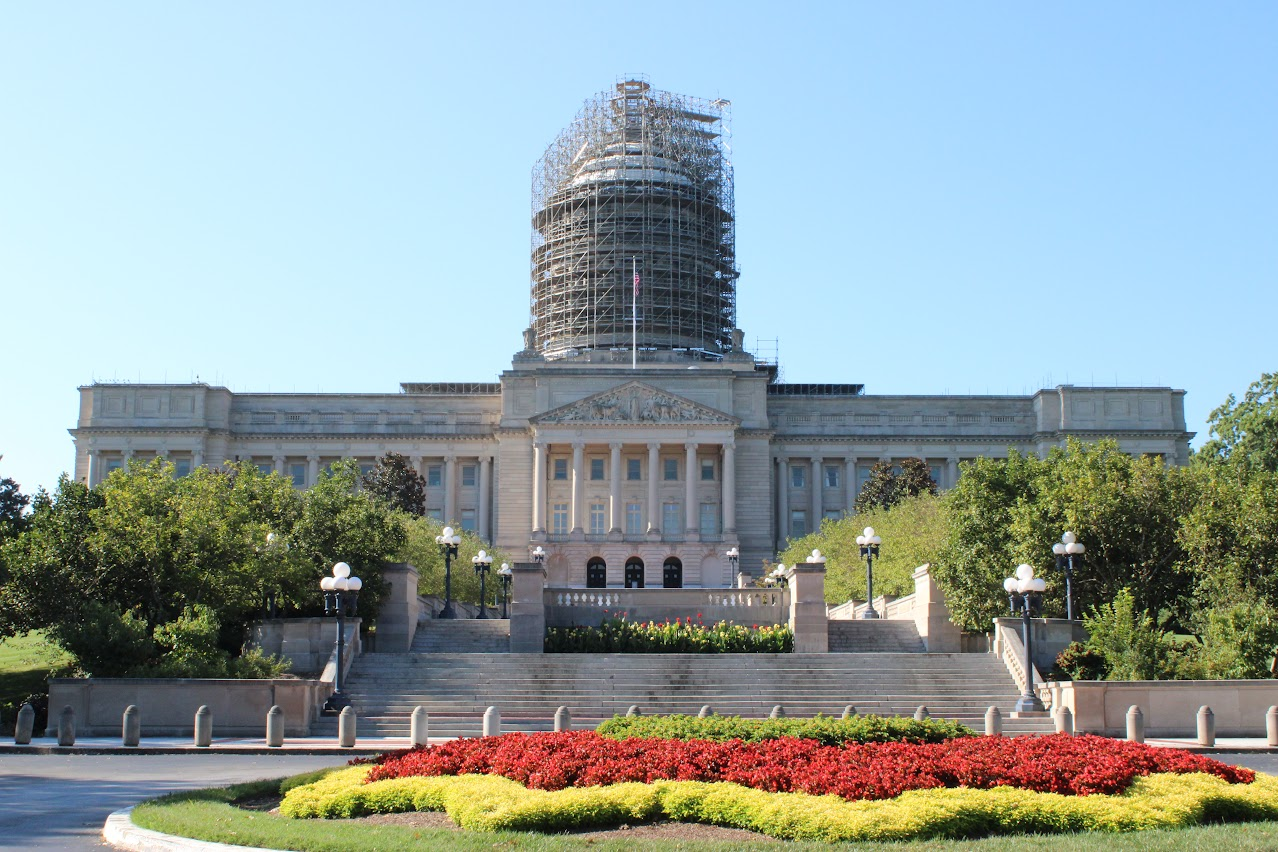
The Kentucky State Capitol on September 3, 2023.

| Preceded by Mother of God Roman Catholic Church | Tallest Building in Kentucky; 1910–1912 | Succeeded by Kentucky Home Life Building |
