= Candy Massaroni =

American politician (born 1980)

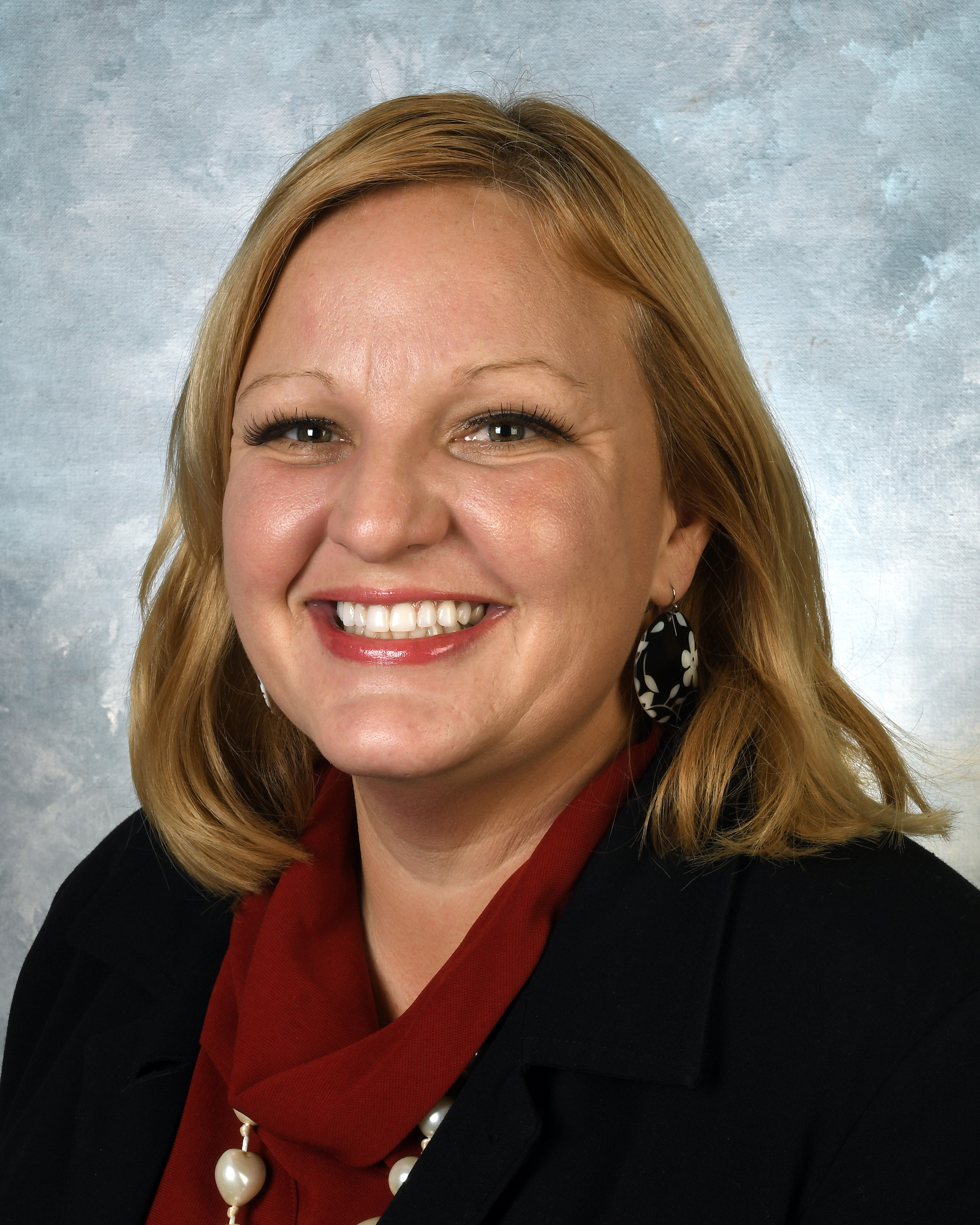

Member of the Kentucky House of Representatives from the 50th district
- Incumbent
- Assumed office January 1, 2023
- Preceded by: Chad McCoy

Personal details
- Born: July 30, 1980 (age 45)
- Party: Republican
- Committees: Education; Tourism & Outdoor Recreation; Veterans, Military Affairs, & Public Protection

Candy Desiree Massaroni (born July 30, 1980) is an American politician and Republican member of the Kentucky House of Representatives from Kentucky's 50th House district since January 2023. Her district consists of Nelson County.

== Background ==
Massaroni was born in Kentucky and moved to Nelson County in 2012. She is a U.S. Air Force veteran, having served for ten years with multiple oversees deployments.

== Political career ==
- 2022 Incumbent representative Chad McCoy chose not to seek reelection to Kentucky's 50th House district. Massaroni won the 2022 Republican primary with 1,523 votes (44.9%) and was unopposed in the 2022 Kentucky House of Representatives election, winning with 12,770 votes.
- 2024 Massaroni won the 2024 Republican primary with 2,183 votes (64.4%) against challenger Andy Stone and was unopposed in the 2024 Kentucky House of Representatives election, winning with 16,783 votes.

Kentucky House of Representatives
Preceded by Chad McCoy	Member of the Kentucky House of Representatives; 2023–present	Succeeded by incumbent
