= Kentucky's 50th House of Representatives district =

American legislative district

Kentucky's 50th State House of Representatives district
Representative
Candy Massaroni; R–Bardstown
since January 1, 2023
- Registration: 47.8% Republican; 41.7% Democratic; 10.0% No party preference
- Demographics: 89.1% White; 5.2% Black; 2.9% Hispanic; 0.5% Asian; 0.1% Other; 2.2% Multiracial
- Population (2024): 47,606
- Registered voters (2026): 35,514

Kentucky's 50th House of Representatives district is one of 100 districts in the Kentucky House of Representatives. Located in the central part of the state, it comprises Nelson County. It has been represented by Candy Massaroni (R–Bardstown) since 2023. As of 2024, the district had a population of 47,606.

== Voter registration ==
On January 1, 2026, the district had 35,514 registered voters, who were registered with the following parties.

Party	Registration	
Party	Voters	%
Republican	16,966	47.77
Democratic	14,809	41.70
Independent	1,518	4.27
Libertarian	145	0.41
Green	25	0.07
Constitution	12	0.03
Socialist Workers	6	0.02
Reform	0	0.00
"Other"	2,033	5.72
Total	35,514	100.00

== List of members representing the district ==
Member	Party	Years	Electoral history	District location
Kenny Rapier (Bardstown)	Democratic	January 1, 1980 – January 1, 1997	Elected in 1979. Reelected in 1981. Reelected in 1984. Reelected in 1986. Reelected in 1988. Reelected in 1990. Reelected in 1992. Reelected in 1994. Retired.	1974–1985; Anderson (part), Nelson, and Washington (part) Counties.
Kenny Rapier (Bardstown)	Democratic	January 1, 1980 – January 1, 1997	Elected in 1979. Reelected in 1981. Reelected in 1984. Reelected in 1986. Reelected in 1988. Reelected in 1990. Reelected in 1992. Reelected in 1994. Retired.	1985–1993; Nelson and Washington Counties.
Kenny Rapier (Bardstown)	Democratic	January 1, 1980 – January 1, 1997	Elected in 1979. Reelected in 1981. Reelected in 1984. Reelected in 1986. Reelected in 1988. Reelected in 1990. Reelected in 1992. Reelected in 1994. Retired.	1993–1997; Nelson, Spencer (part), and Washington (part) Counties.
Jodie Haydon (Bardstown)	Democratic	January 1, 1997 – January 1, 2005	Elected in 1996. Reelected in 1998. Reelected in 2000. Reelected in 2002. Retired.	1997–2003
Jodie Haydon (Bardstown)	Democratic	January 1, 1997 – January 1, 2005	Elected in 1996. Reelected in 1998. Reelected in 2000. Reelected in 2002. Retired.	2003–2015
David Floyd (Bardstown)	Republican	January 1, 2005 – January 1, 2017	Elected in 2004. Reelected in 2006. Reelected in 2008. Reelected in 2010. Reelected in 2012. Reelected in 2014. Retired.	2003–2015
David Floyd (Bardstown)	Republican	January 1, 2005 – January 1, 2017	Elected in 2004. Reelected in 2006. Reelected in 2008. Reelected in 2010. Reelected in 2012. Reelected in 2014. Retired.	2015–2023
Chad McCoy (Bardstown)	Republican	January 1, 2017 – January 1, 2023	Elected in 2016. Reelected in 2018. Reelected in 2020. Retired.	2015–2023
Candy Massaroni (Bardstown)	Republican	January 1, 2023 – present	Elected in 2022. Reelected in 2024. Reelected in 2026.	2023–present
