= Jodie Haydon (politician) =

American politician (1945–2025)

Member of the Kentucky House of Representatives from the 50th district
- In office January 1, 1997 – January 1, 2005
- Preceded by: Kenny Rapier
- Succeeded by: David Floyd

Personal details
- Born: March 1, 1945
- Died: November 24, 2025 (aged 80)
- Party: Democratic

Joseph Albert Haydon (March 1, 1945 – November 24, 2025) was an American politician from Kentucky who was a member of the Kentucky House of Representatives from 1997 to 2005. Haydon was first elected in 1996, after incumbent representative Kenny Rapier retired. He did not seek reelection in 2004 and was succeeded by Republican David Floyd. Haydon died on November 24, 2025, at the age of 80.
