= Kentucky's 56th House of Representatives district =

American legislative district

Kentucky's 56th State House of Representatives district
Representative
Daniel Fister; R–Versailles
since January 1, 2021
- Registration: 46.5% Republican; 42.4% Democratic; 10.4% No party preference
- Demographics: 86.2% White; 4.1% Black; 5.9% Hispanic; 0.3% Asian; 0.1% Native American; 0.5% Other; 2.9% Multiracial
- Population (2024): 45,005
- Registered voters (2026): 35,030

Kentucky's 56th House of Representatives district is one of 100 districts in the Kentucky House of Representatives. Located in the central part of the state, it comprises Woodford and parts of Franklin and Jessamine Counties. It has been represented by Daniel Fister (R–Versailles) since 2021. As of 2024, the district had a population of 45,005.

== Voter registration ==
On January 1, 2026, the district had 35,030 registered voters, who were registered with the following parties.

Party	Registration	
Party	Voters	%
Republican	16,285	46.49
Democratic	14,852	42.40
Independent	2,148	6.13
Libertarian	196	0.56
Green	28	0.08
Constitution	12	0.03
Socialist Workers	4	0.01
Reform	2	0.01
"Other"	1,503	4.29
Total	35,030	100.00

== List of members representing the district ==
Member	Party	Years	Electoral history	District location
Joe Barrows (Versailles)	Democratic	January 1, 1980 – January 1, 2007	Elected in 1979. Reelected in 1981. Reelected in 1984. Reelected in 1986. Reelected in 1988. Reelected in 1990. Reelected in 1992. Reelected in 1994. Reelected in 1996. Reelected in 1998. Reelected in 2000. Reelected in 2002. Reelected in 2004. Retired.	1974–1985; Jessamine and Woodford Counties.
Joe Barrows (Versailles)	Democratic	January 1, 1980 – January 1, 2007	Elected in 1979. Reelected in 1981. Reelected in 1984. Reelected in 1986. Reelected in 1988. Reelected in 1990. Reelected in 1992. Reelected in 1994. Reelected in 1996. Reelected in 1998. Reelected in 2000. Reelected in 2002. Reelected in 2004. Retired.	1985–1993; Franklin (part), Jessamine (part), and Woodford Counties.
Joe Barrows (Versailles)	Democratic	January 1, 1980 – January 1, 2007	Elected in 1979. Reelected in 1981. Reelected in 1984. Reelected in 1986. Reelected in 1988. Reelected in 1990. Reelected in 1992. Reelected in 1994. Reelected in 1996. Reelected in 1998. Reelected in 2000. Reelected in 2002. Reelected in 2004. Retired.	1993–1997; Franklin (part), Jessamine (part), and Woodford Counties.
Joe Barrows (Versailles)	Democratic	January 1, 1980 – January 1, 2007	Elected in 1979. Reelected in 1981. Reelected in 1984. Reelected in 1986. Reelected in 1988. Reelected in 1990. Reelected in 1992. Reelected in 1994. Reelected in 1996. Reelected in 1998. Reelected in 2000. Reelected in 2002. Reelected in 2004. Retired.	1997–2003
Joe Barrows (Versailles)	Democratic	January 1, 1980 – January 1, 2007	Elected in 1979. Reelected in 1981. Reelected in 1984. Reelected in 1986. Reelected in 1988. Reelected in 1990. Reelected in 1992. Reelected in 1994. Reelected in 1996. Reelected in 1998. Reelected in 2000. Reelected in 2002. Reelected in 2004. Retired.	2003–2015
Carl Rollins (Midway)	Democratic	January 1, 2007 – April 2013	Elected in 2006. Reelected in 2008. Reelected in 2010. Reelected in 2012. Resigned to become chief executive of the Kentucky Higher Education Assistance Authority.	2003–2015
James Kay (Versailles)	Democratic	June 2013 – January 1, 2019	Elected to finish Rollins's term. Reelected in 2014. Reelected in 2016. Retired to run for Judge/Executive of Woodford County.	2003–2015
James Kay (Versailles)	Democratic	June 2013 – January 1, 2019	Elected to finish Rollins's term. Reelected in 2014. Reelected in 2016. Retired to run for Judge/Executive of Woodford County.	2015–2023
Joe Graviss (Versailles)	Democratic	January 1, 2019 – January 1, 2021	Elected in 2018. Retired to run for the Kentucky Senate.	2015–2023
Daniel Fister (Versailles)	Republican	January 1, 2021 – present	Elected in 2020. Reelected in 2022. Reelected in 2024. Reelected in 2026.	2015–2023
Daniel Fister (Versailles)	Republican	January 1, 2021 – present	Elected in 2020. Reelected in 2022. Reelected in 2024. Reelected in 2026.	2023–present
