= Joe Graviss =

American politician

Member of the Kentucky House of Representatives from the 56th district
- In office January 1, 2019 – January 1, 2021
- Preceded by: James Kay
- Succeeded by: Daniel Fister

Personal details
- Born: April 23, 1962 (age 64)
- Party: Democratic
- Education: Transylvania University (BS)

Joseph A. Graviss (born April 23, 1962) is an American politician from Kentucky who was a member of the Kentucky House of Representatives from 2019 to 2021. Graviss was elected in 2018 after incumbent representative James Kay retired to run for Judge/Executive of Woodford County. He left the house to unsuccessfully ran for the Kentucky Senate in 2020.
