= Statue of Jefferson Davis (Frankfort, Kentucky) =

Statue in Frankfort, Kentucky, U.S.

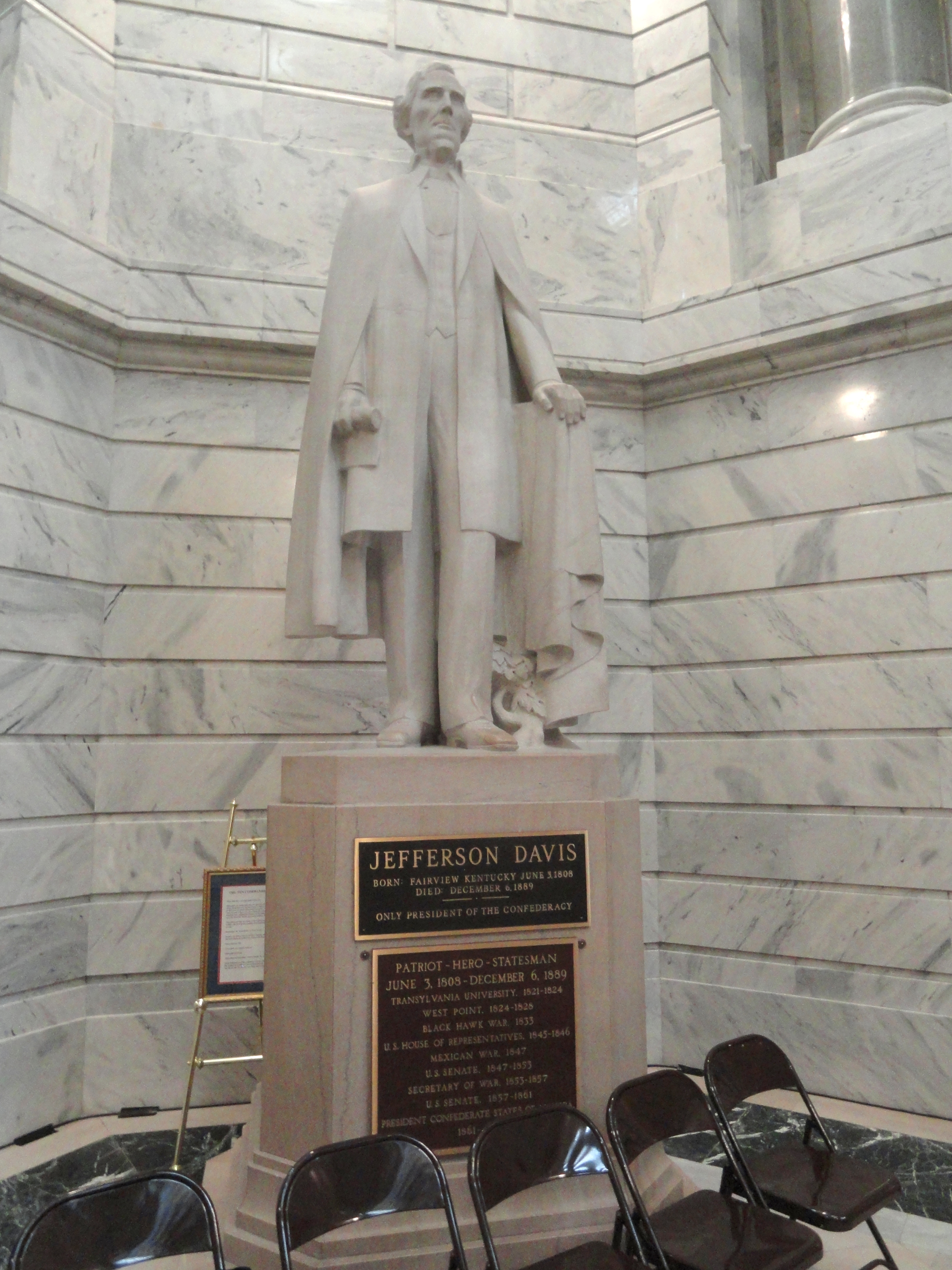
- Artist: Frederick Hibbard
- Year: 1936
- Medium: Tennessee marble
- Subject: Jefferson Davis
- Dimensions: 4.6 m (15 ft)
- Location: Frankfort, Kentucky, U.S.
- Owner: Commonwealth of Kentucky

The Statue of Jefferson Davis was unveiled in the Kentucky State Capitol Rotunda, in Frankfort, Kentucky on December 10, 1936. It depicts Jefferson Davis, president of the Confederate States of America. It was erected under the auspices of the United Daughters of the Confederacy. It remained there until June 13, 2020. The Historic Properties Advisory Commission voted to move the statue out of the Rotunda to the Jefferson Davis State Historic Site near Fairview, Kentucky.

There were two plaques affixed to the base of the statue, which read:

JEFFERSON DAVIS
BORN: FAIRVIEW KENTUCKY JUNE 3, 1808
DIED: DECEMBER 6, 1889
ONLY PRESIDENT OF THE CONFEDERACY

PATRIOT – HERO – STATESMAN
JUNE 3, 1808 – DECEMBER 6, 1889
TRANSYLVANIA UNIVERSITY, 1821 – 1824
WEST POINT, 1824 – 1828
BLACK HAWK WAR, 1833
U.S. HOUSE OF REPRESENTATIVES, 1845 – 1846
MEXICAN WAR, 1847
U.S. SENATE, 1847 – 1853
SECRETARY OF WAR, 1853 – 1857
U.S. SENATE, 1857 – 1861
PRESIDENT CONFEDERATE STATES OF AMERICA,
1861 – 1865

In 2018, the second plaque was removed.
