= David Floyd =

American politician

Member of the Kentucky House of Representatives from the 50th district
- In office January 1, 2005 – January 1, 2017
- Preceded by: Jodie Haydon
- Succeeded by: Chad McCoy

Personal details
- Born: October 2, 1951 (age 75) Louisville, Kentucky, U.S.
- Party: Republican
- Education: United States Air Force Academy (BS); Embry–Riddle Aeronautical University (MA)

Military service
- Branch/service: United States Air Force
- Years of service: 1973–1995
- Rank: Lieutenant colonel
- Battles/wars: Gulf War

David William Floyd (born October 2, 1951) is an American politician and a former Republican member of the Kentucky House of Representatives, serving from 2005 until 2017. He represented Kentucky's 50th House district, which consists of Nelson County.

== Background ==
Floyd earned a Bachelor of Science degree from the United States Air Force Academy, and a Master of Arts degree in aeronautics from Embry–Riddle Aeronautical University. He served for 22 years in the United States Air Force, flying as a wing operations officer primarily aboard KC-135 Stratotankers. He was deployed during the Gulf War, taking part in both Operation Desert Shield and Operation Desert Storm.

After retiring from the air force, Floyd returned to Nelson County where he and his brothers opened an assisted living center.

== Political career ==
Floyd served for 12 years in the Kentucky House of Representatives, winning a total of six elections. During his time in the chamber, Floyd was known for pushing to abolish the death penalty in Kentucky and served as minority whip from 2009 to 2011. He did not seek reelection to the house in 2016, and endorsed Chad McCoy as his successor. After his tenure as a representative, Floyd returned to the House as chief of staff to Kentucky House Speaker David Osborne.

=== Elections ===
- 1996 Floyd initially ran for the District 50 seat and won the 1996 Republican Primary but lost the November 5, 1996 General election to Democratic nominee Jodie Haydon.
- 1998 Floyd and Representative Haydon were both unopposed for their 1998 primaries, setting up a rematch; Floyd lost the November 3, 1998 General election to Representative Haydon.
- 2004 When Representative Haydon left the Legislature and left the seat open, Floyd won the 2004 Republican Primary with 569 votes (72.0%) and won the November 2, 2004 General election with 9,952 votes (54.0%) against Democratic nominee Tommy Reed.
- 2006 Floyd was unopposed for both the 2006 Republican Primary and the November 7, 2006 General election, winning with 7,880 votes.
- 2008 Floyd was unopposed for both the 2008 Republican Primary and the November 4, 2008 General election, winning with 14,623 votes.
- 2010 Floyd was unopposed for the May 18, 2010 Republican Primary and won the November 2, 2010 General election with 10,325 votes (63.4%) against Democratic nominee Eddie O'Daniel.
- 2012 Floyd was challenged in the May 22, 2012 Republican Primary, winning with 894 votes (72.6%) and won the November 6, 2012 General election with 11,379 votes (53.4%) against Democratic nominee Dick Heaton.
- 2014 Floyd was unopposed in the May 20, 2014 Republican Primary and won the November 4, 2014 Kentucky House of Representatives election with 7,933 votes (53.3%) against Democratic nominee Audrey Haydon.
