= Carl Rollins =

American politician

Member of the Kentucky House of Representatives from the 56th district
- In office January 1, 2007 – April 2013
- Preceded by: Joe Barrows
- Succeeded by: James Kay

Personal details
- Born: August 4, 1947 (age 79)
- Party: Democratic

Carl P. Rollins II (born August 4, 1947) is an American politician from Kentucky who was a member of the Kentucky House of Representatives from 2007 to 2013. Rollins was first elected in 2006 after incumbent representative Joe Barrows retired. He resigned from the house in April 2013 in order to become chief executive of the Kentucky Higher Education Assistance Authority.
