= Chad McCoy =

American politician and attorney

Member of the Kentucky House of Representatives from the 50th district
- In office January 1, 2017 – January 1, 2023
- Preceded by: David Floyd
- Succeeded by: Candy Massaroni

Personal details
- Born: October 5, 1970 (age 55)
- Party: Republican

Dustan Chad McCoy (born October 5, 1970) is a former Republican member of the Kentucky House of Representatives. He represented District 50 and served as the chamber's majority whip. He was first elected to the house in 2016 after incumbent representative David Floyd retired. He did not seek reelection in 2022 and was succeeded by Candy Massaroni.

== Personal life ==
McCoy is an attorney and lives in Bardstown, Kentucky.
