= Joe Barrows =

American politician

Majority Whip of the Kentucky House of Representatives
- In office January 7, 1997 – January 1, 2007
- Preceded by: Kenny Rapier
- Succeeded by: Rob Wilkey

Member of the Kentucky House of Representatives from the 56th district
- In office January 1, 1980 – January 1, 2007
- Preceded by: John Carpenter
- Succeeded by: Carl Rollins

Personal details
- Born: April 16, 1950 (age 76) Fort Ord, California, U.S.
- Party: Democratic
- Spouse: Jean
- Children: 2
- Education: DePauw University (BA); University of Kentucky (JD)

Joseph Howard Barrows (born April 16, 1950) is an American politician from Kentucky who was a member of the Kentucky House of Representatives from 1980 to 2007. Barrows was first elected in 1979, defeating incumbent representative John Carpenter in the May primary election. He did not seek reelection in 2006.
