= Kenny Rapier =

American politician

Majority Whip of the Kentucky House of Representatives
- In office January 8, 1985 – January 1, 1997
- Preceded by: James R. Dunn
- Succeeded by: Joe Barrows

Member of the Kentucky House of Representatives from the 50th district
- In office January 1, 1980 – January 1, 1997
- Preceded by: John Hurst
- Succeeded by: Jodie Haydon

Personal details
- Born: September 20, 1936
- Died: August 5, 2002 (aged 65)
- Party: Democratic

William Kenneth Rapier (September 20, 1936 – August 5, 2002) was an American politician from Kentucky who was a member of the Kentucky House of Representatives from 1980 to 1997. Rapier was first elected in 1979, defeating incumbent Democratic representative John Hurst for renomination. He did not seek reelection in 1996.

He died in August 2002 at age 65.
