= James Kay (Kentucky politician) =

American politician

Judge/Executive of Woodford County
- Incumbent
- Assumed office January 7, 2019
- Preceded by: John Coyle

Member of the Kentucky House of Representatives from the 56th district
- In office June 2013 – January 1, 2019
- Preceded by: Carl Rollins
- Succeeded by: Joe Graviss

Personal details
- Born: December 19, 1982 (age 43) Woodford County, Kentucky, U.S.
- Party: Democratic
- Education: University of Kentucky; University of Kentucky College of Law
- Profession: Attorney
- Website: votejameskay.com

James Leer Kay II (born December 19, 1982) is an American politician serving as the Judge/Executive of Woodford County since January 2019. He was previously a Democratic member of the Kentucky House of Representatives representing District 56 from his June 24, 2013 special election to 2019.

== Education ==
Kay earned his BA in history and political science from the University of Kentucky and his JD from University of Kentucky College of Law.

== Elections ==
- 2013 When District 56 Representative Rollins left the Legislature and left the seat open, Kay won the three-way June 25, 2013 Special election with 3,925 votes (44.0%) against Republican candidate Lyen Crews (who had run for the seat in 2010) and Independent candidate John-Mark Hack.
