= List of United States tornadoes from August to October 2018 =

United States tornadoes from August to October 2018
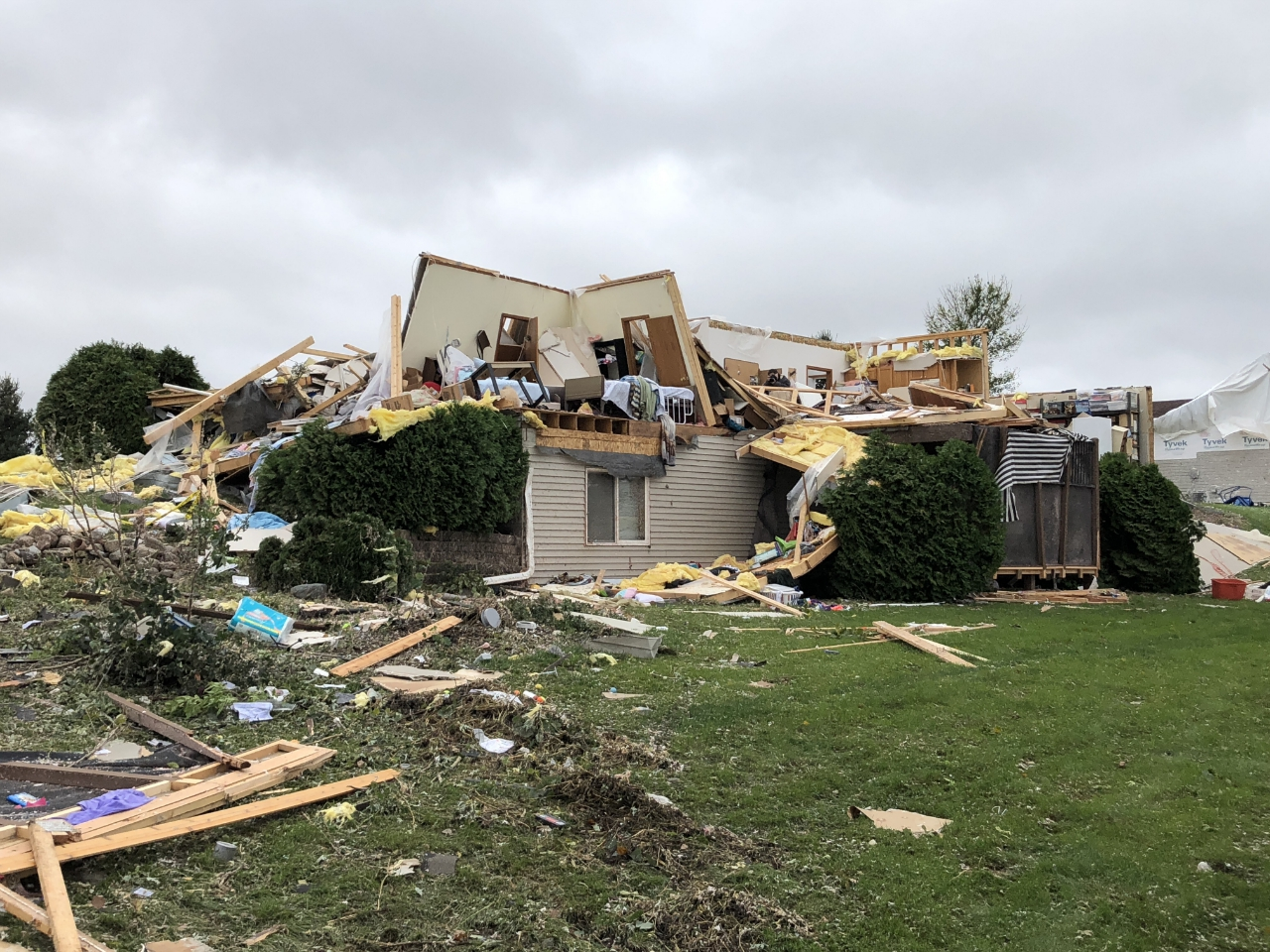
- Clockwise from top: A mobile home near Alexandria, Louisiana destroyed after an EF2 tornado on October 31; A communications tower near Brownsville, Wisconsin after a tornado struck on August 28; High-end EF2 damage after a tornado in Morristown, Minnesota on September 20
- Timespan: August 1 – October 31
- Maximum rated tornado: EF2 tornado: List; Brownsville, Wisconsin on August 28; Midlothian, Virginia on September 17; Morristown, Minnesota on September 20; Faribault, Minnesota on September 20; Conneautville, Pennsylvania on October 2; Hartsfield, Pennsylvania on October 2; Brookville, Pennsylvania on October 2; Donegal, Pennsylvania on October 2; Christoval, Texas on October 13; Alexandria-Trout, Louisiana on October 31
- Tornadoes: 296
- Fatalities: 1
- Injuries: 9

This page documents all tornadoes confirmed by various weather forecast offices of the National Weather Service in the United States during August to October 2018. Tornado counts are considered preliminary until final publication in the database of the National Centers for Environmental Information.

== United States yearly total ==
Confirmed tornadoes by Enhanced Fujita rating
EFU	EF0	EF1	EF2	EF3	EF4	EF5	Total
15	619	399	76	12	0	0	1,121

== August ==
Confirmed tornadoes by Enhanced Fujita rating
EFU	EF0	EF1	EF2	EF3	EF4	EF5	Total
0	50	31	1	0	0	0	82

=== August 1 event ===
List of confirmed tornadoes – Wednesday, August 1, 2018 (Note: All dates are based on the local time zone where the tornado touched down; however, all times are in Coordinated Universal Time for consistency.)
EF#	Location	County / Parish	State	Start Coord.	Time (UTC)	Path length	Max width
EF0	Taylor	Wayne	MI	42.1990°N 83.2646°W	04:44–04:46	0.8 mi (1.3 km)	100 yd (91 m)
EF0	A business sign and some small trees were damaged. Three buildings were impacted, including damage to their roofs and displacement of an AC unit.						
EF1	NE of Social Circle	Walton	GA	33.6791°N 83.6926°W	23:32–23:33	0.28 mi (0.45 km)	100 yd (91 m)
EF1	Around 20 to 30 trees had their trunks snapped or large branches downed. Six homes were damaged, of which two were impacted severely by fallen trees.						
EF0	NNW of Abbeville	Abbeville	SC	34.269°N 82.419°W	02:30–02:43	3.82 mi (6.15 km)	30 yd (27 m)
EF0	Trees and branches were downed, and some outbuildings were heavily damaged.						

=== August 2 event ===
List of confirmed tornadoes – Thursday, August 2, 2018
EF#	Location	County / Parish	State	Start Coord.	Time (UTC)	Path length	Max width
EF0	S of Charlottesville	Albemarle	VA	37.9815°N 78.5068°W	15:00–15:05	2 mi (3.2 km)	75 yd (69 m)
EF0	Many trees were snapped or uprooted, and Monticello High School sustained damage to its windows and doors. Trees and parking lot lights at the school were downed as well. A chimney was toppled onto the roof a home.						
EF0	W of Round Oak	Jones	GA	33.1037°N 83.6601°E	19:57–19:58	1.1 mi (1.8 km)	100 yd (91 m)
EF0	A weak tornado downed up to 10 trees. One home was damaged due to a fallen tree.						
EF0	College Point	Queens	NY	40.7845°N 73.8443°W	02:20–02:23	0.75 mi (1.21 km)	100 yd (91 m)
EF0	Numerous trees and power lines were knocked down, and siding was peeled off houses. At least 50 trees were downed in Powell's Cove Park. Damage totaled $10,000.						

=== August 3 event ===
List of confirmed tornadoes – Friday, August 3, 2018
EF#	Location	County / Parish	State	Start Coord.	Time (UTC)	Path length	Max width
EF0	E of Denver	Greene	NY	42.216°N 74.503°W	16:24–16:32	1.9 mi (3.1 km)	67 yd (61 m)
EF0	Many trees were snapped or uprooted.						
EF0	N of Atwater	Kandiyohi, Meeker	MN	45.1407°N 94.7912°W	23:34–22:45	11.09 mi (17.85 km)	300 yd (270 m)
EF0	Trees were damaged, a trailer was overturned, and minor damage was inflicted to sheds and pole barns.						

=== August 4 event ===
List of confirmed tornadoes – Saturday, August 4, 2018
EF#	Location	County / Parish	State	Start Coord.	Time (UTC)	Path length	Max width
EF0	Northern Woodstock	Windham	CT	41.9982°N 72.0377°W	13:36–13:45	5.24 mi (8.43 km)	8 yd (7.3 m)
EF0	A weak, intermittent tornado caused tree damage along its path.						
EF1	Dudley to Webster	Worcester	MA	42.0456°N 71.8907°W	13:59–14:00	0.47 mi (0.76 km)	300 yd (270 m)
EF1	This tornado touched down in Dudley before striking downtown Webster at high-end EF1 intensity, resulting in heavy damage. Businesses had their roofs and facades blown off, and windows were blown out. Many trees and power lines were downed as well, some of which landed on structures. One person was injured.						

=== August 5 event ===
List of confirmed tornadoes – Sunday, August 5, 2018
EF#	Location	County / Parish	State	Start Coord.	Time (UTC)	Path length	Max width
EF0	SSE of White Lake	Aurora	SD	43.7039°N 98.7043°W	05:40–05:45	2.02 mi (3.25 km)	100 yd (91 m)
EF0	Crops, fences, and trees were damaged. Hay bales were moved as well.						
EF0	S of Peterson	Buena Vista	IA	42.8801°N 95.3517°W	08:45–08:46	0.27 mi (0.43 km)	25 yd (23 m)
EF0	Some crops and tree branches were damaged.						

=== August 6 event ===
List of confirmed tornadoes – Monday, August 6, 2018
EF#	Location	County / Parish	State	Start Coord.	Time (UTC)	Path length	Max width
EF0	SW of Buel Township	Sanilac	MI	43.276°N 82.692°W	23:12–23:13	0.17 mi (0.27 km)	25 yd (23 m)
EF0	The public recorded a brief tornado.						
EF1	Warsaw	Kosciusko	IN	41.2449°N 85.829°W	00:27–00:34	4.04 mi (6.50 km)	50 yd (46 m)
EF1	Numerous trees were snapped or uprooted. Several power poles were snapped. Some homes suffered roof and siding damage either by tornadic winds or fallen trees.						
EF1	N of Bradshaw	York	NE	40.9933°N 97.7701°W	00:43–00:47	1.62 mi (2.61 km)	125 yd (114 m)
EF1	A home suffered damage to its soffits, garage doors, and roof. Grain bins, trees, and two irrigation pivots were damaged as well.						

=== August 7 event ===
List of confirmed tornadoes – Tuesday, August 7, 2018
EF#	Location	County / Parish	State	Start Coord.	Time (UTC)	Path length	Max width
EF0	SE of Groves	Jefferson	TX	29.92°N 93.88°W	16:30–16:31	0.12 mi (0.19 km)	10 yd (9.1 m)
EF0	Public video documented a brief landspout tornado.						
EF0	ENE of Randall	Burnett	WI	45.71°N 92.77°W	17:39	0.01 mi (0.016 km)	1 yd (0.91 m)
EF0	Multiple pictures and videos showed a landspout tornado over the Fish Lake Wildlife Area.						
EF0	WNW of Klondike	Cameron	LA	30.04°N 92.66°W	20:00–20:01	0.14 mi (0.23 km)	10 yd (9.1 m)
EF0	A social media picture documented a landspout tornado.						

=== August 8 event ===
List of confirmed tornadoes – Wednesday, August 8, 2018
EF#	Location	County / Parish	State	Start Coord.	Time (UTC)	Path length	Max width
EF0	NNW of Keota	Weld	CO	40.72°N 104.09°W	12:36–12:37	0.01 mi (0.016 km)	50 yd (46 m)
EF0	A trained storm spotter reported a brief tornado in an open field.						

=== August 9 event ===
List of confirmed tornadoes – Thursday, August 9, 2018
EF#	Location	County / Parish	State	Start Coord.	Time (UTC)	Path length	Max width
EF0	S of Eagle Nest	Colfax	NM	36.531°N 105.2861°W	20:25–20:33	2.27 mi (3.65 km)	80 yd (73 m)
EF0	An anticyclonic, high-elevation tornado downed and damaged about 180 ft (55 m) of barbed wire and/or picket fence; several steel T-posts were bent at nearly a right angle. Ten units at a camping property were damaged, with almost all structural windows blown out and the bed of an old truck lifted and carried about 50 yd (46 m). An old hay barn was collapsed, an unoccupied fifth wheel recreational vehicle weighing about 12,000 lb (5,400 kg) was lifted and rolled onto its side, and several other vehicles saw their windows busted. This was the first tornado in the Moreno Valley going back to 1950.						
EF0	Deerfield	Dane	WI	43.058°N 89.0775°W	20:47–20:51	0.7 mi (1.1 km)	25 yd (23 m)
EF0	Several trees were snapped or uprooted. One large warehouse building had its garage door blown in and sustained significant roof damage, with a majority of the roofing material falling into the structure.						

=== August 11 event ===
List of confirmed tornadoes – Saturday, August 11, 2018
EF#	Location	County / Parish	State	Start Coord.	Time (UTC)	Path length	Max width
EF0	NW of Big Spring	Howard	TX	32.2909°N 101.5184°W	00:38–00:40	0.36 mi (0.58 km)	100 yd (91 m)
EF0	A trained storm spotter reported a landspout tornado.						

=== August 14 event ===
List of confirmed tornadoes – Tuesday, August 14, 2018
EF#	Location	County / Parish	State	Start Coord.	Time (UTC)	Path length	Max width
EF0	N of Elk City	Montgomery	KS	37.3168°N 95.9237°W	22:38–22:39	0.27 mi (0.43 km)	50 yd (46 m)
EF0	Confirmation of a brief tornado was relayed over social media.						

=== August 15 event ===
List of confirmed tornadoes – Wednesday, August 15, 2018
EF#	Location	County / Parish	State	Start Coord.	Time (UTC)	Path length	Max width
EF0	SSE of Badger Grove	White	IN	40.5666°N 86.9533°W	00:07–00:10	0.26 mi (0.42 km)	22 yd (20 m)
EF0	Numerous crops were flattened, a tree was pushed over, a house had some of its shingles blown off, and a barn sustained heavy roof damage.						

=== August 16 event ===
List of confirmed tornadoes – Thursday, August 16, 2018
EF#	Location	County / Parish	State	Start Coord.	Time (UTC)	Path length	Max width
EF0	SW of Cuba	Fulton	IL	40.4679°N 90.2645°W	21:38–21:48	3.15 mi (5.07 km)	100 yd (91 m)
EF0	A pole barn and a small shed were destroyed on a farmstead; flying debris from the barn caused minor roof damage siding damage to the house. Minor crop damage occurred as well.						
EF0	NNW of Anza	Riverside	CA	33.5624°N 116.6855°W	22:00–22:30	0.24 mi (0.39 km)	2 yd (1.8 m)
EF0	The public reported a landspout tornado.						
EF0	Oxford Junction	Jones	IA	41.98°N 90.96°W	23:08	0.01 mi (0.016 km)	10 yd (9.1 m)
EF0	Shingles and a ventilation pipe were blown off a roof.						
EF0	SE of Albert	Barton	KS	38.44°N 99.01°W	00:30–00:31	0.4 mi (0.64 km)	50 yd (46 m)
EF0	A fire chief reported a brief tornado.						

=== August 17 event ===
List of confirmed tornadoes – Friday, August 17, 2018
EF#	Location	County / Parish	State	Start Coord.	Time (UTC)	Path length	Max width
EF1	Madison	Madison	MS	32.4354°N 90.1147°W	22:03–22:10	1.7 mi (2.7 km)	250 yd (230 m)
EF1	Numerous trees were snapped or uprooted, many of which caused substantial damage to homes upon falling. Playground equipment at a church sustained considerable damage. Two hangars and a building were damaged at Bruce Campbell Field. An airport AWOS recorded a peak gust of 97 mph (156 km/h).						

=== August 18 event ===
List of confirmed tornadoes – Saturday, August 18, 2018
EF#	Location	County / Parish	State	Start Coord.	Time (UTC)	Path length	Max width
EF0	SE of Flagstaff	Coconino	AZ	35.11°N 111.47°W	21:22–21:27	3.07 mi (4.94 km)	10 yd (9.1 m)
EF0	A trained storm spotter videoed a tornado.						
EF0	NNW of Horace	Greeley	KS	38.5868°N 101.8573°W	22:40–22:41	0.29 mi (0.47 km)	25 yd (23 m)
EF0	The public reported a brief tornado.						

=== August 19 event ===
List of confirmed tornadoes – Sunday, August 19, 2018
EF#	Location	County / Parish	State	Start Coord.	Time (UTC)	Path length	Max width
EF0	SE of Montevallo	Vernon	MO	37.66°N 94.08°W	11:05	0.1 mi (0.16 km)	50 yd (46 m)
EF0	A barn saw its roof damaged.						
EF0	E of Diggins	Webster	MO	37.15°N 92.85°W	20:32–20:47	4 mi (6.4 km)	50 yd (46 m)
EF0	Trees were snapped or uprooted.						
EF1	E of Inola	Rogers, Mayes	OK	36.1307°N 95.4613°W	20:34–20:55	8.4 mi (13.5 km)	350 yd (320 m)
EF1	Numerous trees were snapped or uprooted, an outbuilding was destroyed, and horse trailers were tossed. One house and some mobile homes were damaged. An Oklahoma mesonet recorded wind gusts of 98 mph (158 km/h) at 2 m (7 ft) above ground.						
EF1	W of Mazie	Mayes	OK	36.0760°N 95.4400°W	20:45–20:58	5.2 mi (8.4 km)	200 yd (180 m)
EF1	Large tree limbs were snapped, outbuildings were damaged or destroyed, and a barn was damaged.						
EF0	Verdella	Barton	MO	37.61°N 94.43°W	22:40	0.01 mi (0.016 km)	50 yd (46 m)
EF0	A center pivot irrigation system was overturned.						
EF0	NW of Wentworth	Newton	MO	37.01°N 94.17°W	22:51–22:53	1.1 mi (1.8 km)	40 yd (37 m)
EF0	An outbuilding and a grain bin were destroyed while numerous trees were damaged.						
EF0	SE of Sheldon	Barton	MO	37.6311°N 94.2574°W	22:54–22:55	0.1 mi (0.16 km)	25 yd (23 m)
EF0	Large tree branches were broken.						
EF1	E of Sheldon	Vernon	MO	37.6468°N 94.2696°W	22:57–22:59	1.01 mi (1.63 km)	100 yd (91 m)
EF1	Farm outbuildings and trees were damaged.						
EF0	NNW of Milford	Barton	MO	37.6266°N 94.1831°W	22:59–23:01	0.25 mi (0.40 km)	25 yd (23 m)
EF0	Large tree branches were snapped.						
EF1	S of Aurora	Barry, Lawrence	MO	36.8815°N 93.738°W	23:42–00:01	9.44 mi (15.19 km)	100 yd (91 m)
EF1	Numerous outbuildings were damaged, numerous trees were uprooted, some powerlines were downed, and two mobile homes lost portions of their roofs.						

=== August 20 event ===
List of confirmed tornadoes – Monday, August 20, 2018
EF#	Location	County / Parish	State	Start Coord.	Time (UTC)	Path length	Max width
EF0	E of Delmar	Clinton	IA	41.9949°N 90.5638°W	20:49–20:51	0.47 mi (0.76 km)	15 yd (14 m)
EF0	Soybeans and trees were damaged.						
EF1	W of Paragould	Greene	AR	36.0380°N 90.6220°W	22:27–22:33	2.4 mi (3.9 km)	120 yd (110 m)
EF1	Two barns were damaged, several trees were snapped or uprooted, and a mobile home was overturned. A storage shed was destroyed and minor roof damage was inflicted.						
EF0	E of Marmaduke	Greene	AR	36.1866°N 90.3432°W	22:51–22:53	0.7 mi (1.1 km)	50 yd (46 m)
EF0	A semi-trailer was overturned and dragged, while a few trees were damaged.						
EF0	Manhattan	Will	IL	41.4267°N 88.0027°W	23:31–23:34	0.27 mi (0.43 km)	100 yd (91 m)
EF0	Multiple patches of corn were flattened.						
EF0	ESE of Wisdom	Beaverhead	MT	45.6145°N 113.4309°W	23:38–23:40	0.75 mi (1.21 km)	3 yd (2.7 m)
EF0	A shed was destroyed, 200 ft (61 m) of buck and rail fencing was downed, and 150 ft (46 m) of 3-wire fencing was destroyed, with a T-post bent. A 50 lb (23 kg) cast iron and tile deck was demolished.						
EF0	Delavan	Walworth	WI	42.6275°N 88.6283°W	01:01–01:05	0.7 mi (1.1 km)	150 yd (140 m)
EF0	Numerous tree limbs were downed, a small dumpster was tipped over, and rubber roofing material to an elementary school was lifted and peeled back. One home suffered gutter and roofing damage. Flags and metal casing to a bank sign were damaged as well.						

=== August 21 event ===
List of confirmed tornadoes – Tuesday, August 21, 2018
EF#	Location	County / Parish	State	Start Coord.	Time (UTC)	Path length	Max width
EF1	Brockport	Jefferson, Elk	PA	41.234°N 78.754°W	20:10–20:12	2.39 mi (3.85 km)	300 yd (270 m)
EF1	Several homes were damaged by fallen trees, and a large tractor was flipped over.						

=== August 23 event ===
List of confirmed tornadoes – Thursday, August 23, 2018
EF#	Location	County / Parish	State	Start Coord.	Time (UTC)	Path length	Max width
EF0	N of Highmore	Hyde	SD	44.7744°N 99.5408°W	23:14–23:23	1.8 mi (2.9 km)	50 yd (46 m)
EF0	A four-wheeler was thrown into a barn, and that structure sustained additional damage to its roof. Many corn stalks in a field were flattened. A hay bale was destroyed and trees were damaged.						
EF0	N of Highmore	Hyde	SD	44.7872°N 99.4686°W	23:27–23:33	0.64 mi (1.03 km)	70 yd (64 m)
EF0	A tornado occurred in a field but caused no damage.						

=== August 26 event ===
List of confirmed tornadoes – Sunday, August 26, 2018
EF#	Location	County / Parish	State	Start Coord.	Time (UTC)	Path length	Max width
EF1	SW of Winger to WNW of Fosston	Norman, Polk	MN	47.46°N 96.18°W	04:30–04:49	20.94 mi (33.70 km)	300 yd (270 m)
EF1	The roofs of two farmhouses were damaged. Numerous barns, sheds, and outbuildings were damaged or destroyed. Grain bins were rolled off their foundations and tossed upward of 200 yd (180 m). Dozens of trees were snapped or uprooted.						
EF1	NNE of Fosston to NNE of Leonard	Polk, Clearwater	MN	47.62°N 95.72°W	04:51–05:12	25.03 mi (40.28 km)	200 yd (180 m)
EF1	A second long-lived tornado badly damaged dozens of acres of sunflowers, as well as over 200 trees. Several campers and pontoons were tossed or rolled, and several lakeside cabins had their windows broken or severe damage to their roofs. Two farm outbuildings suffered major roof damage as well, and one home had a wooden stake impaled into its steel roof.						

=== August 27 event ===
List of confirmed tornadoes – Monday, August 27, 2018
EF#	Location	County / Parish	State	Start Coord.	Time (UTC)	Path length	Max width
EF1	Red Lake State Forest	Beltrami	MN	48.12°N 94.51°W	05:50–05:52	1 mi (1.6 km)	150 yd (140 m)
EF1	Numerous trees were downed.						
EF0	E of Nerstrand	Rice, Goodhue	MN	44.3406°N 93.0498°W	22:17–22:21	2.28 mi (3.67 km)	100 yd (91 m)
EF0	A barn was destroyed by a fire resultant from a downed power pole. A few trees were snapped.						
EF0	Vasa	Goodhue	MN	44.4935°N 92.7473°W	22:37–22:42	2.19 mi (3.52 km)	150 yd (140 m)
EF0	Corn fields were flattened, and roofing was ripped from barns and sheds.						

=== August 28 event ===
List of confirmed tornadoes – Tuesday, August 28, 2018
EF#	Location	County / Parish	State	Start Coord.	Time (UTC)	Path length	Max width
EF1	Wyeville	Monroe	WI	44.0288°N 90.4787°W	05:23–05:29	5.12 mi (8.24 km)	150 yd (140 m)
EF1	Scattered tree damage was noted. Power poles were blown down.						
EF1	S of Oxford	Marquette	WI	43.7691°N 89.5827°W	20:00–20:03	0.65 mi (1.05 km)	50 yd (46 m)
EF1	Trees were snapped and power lines were downed.						
EF1	NE of Endeavor	Marquette	WI	43.7531°N 89.4279°W	20:03–20:06	1.78 mi (2.86 km)	75 yd (69 m)
EF1	Trees were sheared off and uprooted along the path.						
EF1	W of Marquette	Green Lake	WI	43.7393°N 89.2448°W	20:17–20:22	3.12 mi (5.02 km)	90 yd (82 m)
EF1	Numerous trees were snapped.						
EF0	E of Marquette	Green Lake	WI	43.7421°N 89.0904°W	20:25–20:27	2.09 mi (3.36 km)	50 yd (46 m)
EF0	Tree limbs were snapped and crops were damaged along the path.						
EF1	Alto	Fond du Lac	WI	43.6946°N 88.8448°W	20:55–21:00	4.57 mi (7.35 km)	175 yd (160 m)
EF1	This tornado impacted multiple farmsteads, with multiple large farm outbuildings and sheds damaged or destroyed. Debris was scattered through fields, a large swath of corn was flattened, and wooden power poles were bent over. A silo was damaged and many trees were snapped or uprooted, two of which landed on homes.						
EF0	SE of Brandon	Fond du Lac	WI	43.7044°N 88.7147°W	21:00–21:02	0.62 mi (1.00 km)	50 yd (46 m)
EF0	A brief tornado was caught on video. No damage occurred.						
EF1	SE of Oakfield	Fond du Lac	WI	43.6823°N 88.6637°W	21:04–21:07	4.44 mi (7.15 km)	100 yd (91 m)
EF1	Many trees were snapped or uprooted along the path.						
EF0	S of Oakfield	Fond du Lac	WI	43.6395°N 88.5528°W	21:08–21:09	0.14 mi (0.23 km)	50 yd (46 m)
EF0	Two large farm outbuildings sustained roof damage, a few trees were uprooted, and a house had minor damage to its shingles and siding.						
EF2	Western Brownsville to E of South Byron	Dodge, Fond du Lac	WI	43.6153°N 88.5222°W	21:10–21:15	3.87 mi (6.23 km)	150 yd (140 m)
EF2	This strong tornado touched down in the western part of Brownsville, where many trees were downed and homes sustained broken windows and other minor damage. The most intense damage occurred to the northeast of town, where a communications tower was toppled to the ground, a large barn was completely destroyed, and numerous trees were snapped or uprooted. A large swath of corn was flattened, a farmhouse sustained shingle damage, and an outbuilding sustained collapse of a masonry exterior wall as well.						
EF1	South Byron	Fond du Lac	WI	43.6397°N 88.5031°W	21:11–21:12	0.92 mi (1.48 km)	100 yd (91 m)
EF1	A semi-trailer was lifted up and dropped onto a barn, which sustained major structural damage. Trees were snapped and uprooted, and corn was flattened in a convergent pattern in farm fields.						
EF1	N of South Byron	Fond du Lac	WI	43.639°N 88.4876°W	21:11–21:12	0.15 mi (0.24 km)	80 yd (73 m)
EF1	Trees and tree limbs were snapped, and minor shingle damage occurred.						
EF1	Brownsville	Dodge	WI	43.6129°N 88.4999°W	21:11–21:16	2.68 mi (4.31 km)	100 yd (91 m)
EF1	In Brownsville, trees were snapped and uprooted and wooden power poles were bent over. Additional trees were snapped or uprooted to the northeast of town before the tornado dissipated.						
EF1	E of South Byron	Fond du Lac	WI	43.6386°N 88.4267°W	21:16–21:20	2.83 mi (4.55 km)	100 yd (91 m)
EF1	A house sustained damage to its windows, siding, and antennae. An outbuilding was destroyed, and trees were snapped or uprooted, one of which landed on a house.						
EF1	SE of Eden	Fond du Lac	WI	43.6579°N 88.3394°W	21:22–21:26	4.47 mi (7.19 km)	90 yd (82 m)
EF1	A greenhouse and a hay barn were destroyed. Many trees were snapped and uprooted along the path.						
EF1	ENE of Eden	Fond du Lac	WI	43.7299°N 88.25°W	21:27–21:32	4.01 mi (6.45 km)	100 yd (91 m)
EF1	A large metal garage had its roof torn off, a barn was pushed slightly off of its foundation, trees were uprooted, and crops were damaged.						
EF0	ENE of Dundee	Fond du Lac	WI	43.656°N 88.1609°W	21:30–21:31	0.04 mi (0.064 km)	80 yd (73 m)
EF0	Brief tornado caused minor tree and crop damage.						
EF1	E of New Holstein	Calumet, Manitowoc	WI	43.951°N 88.0424°W	21:33–21:35	0.98 mi (1.58 km)	75 yd (69 m)
EF1	Trees were uprooted and a barn was heavily damaged.						
EF1	NW of Cascade	Sheboygan	WI	43.7012°N 88.106°W	21:36–21:41	5.33 mi (8.58 km)	100 yd (91 m)
EF1	Barns and outbuildings were damaged or destroyed, and a small shed was completely blown away. Crops were damaged, and many trees were snapped or uprooted.						
EF0	NE of Oostburg	Sheboygan	WI	43.6755°N 87.7394°W	21:57–21:58	0.3 mi (0.48 km)	75 yd (69 m)
EF0	A house had its garage door blown in.						
EF0	Baldwin	Lake	MI	43.9022°N 85.8639°W	23:27–23:28	1.05 mi (1.69 km)	500 yd (460 m)
EF0	A few buildings saw their walls collapsed, as well as damage to their siding or roofing material. Trees were damaged as well.						
EF1	E of Baldwin	Lake	MI	43.89°N 85.83°W	23:30–23:31	1 mi (1.6 km)	500 yd (460 m)
EF1	Tree trunks were snapped.						
EF0	SE of Alba	Antrim	MI	44.9344°N 84.0003°W	23:49–00:00	6.63 mi (10.67 km)	70 yd (64 m)
EF0	Trees were downed along the path, some of which landed on structures.						
EF0	N of Donahue	Scott, Clinton	IA	41.7553°N 90.6733°W	00:09–00:14	4.08 mi (6.57 km)	25 yd (23 m)
EF0	A house, corn, and trees were damaged.						
EF1	NE of West Branch	Ogemaw	MI	44.3221°N 84.1679°W	00:53–00:55	0.16 mi (0.26 km)	40 yd (37 m)
EF1	Two homes were damaged, one significantly, sustaining partial roof loss and collapse of an exterior wall.						
EF0	NE of Sterling	Arenac	MI	44.0793°N 83.9773°W	00:58–01:00	0.41 mi (0.66 km)	40 yd (37 m)
EF0	Trees were snapped and uprooted along the path, some of which landed on structures.						
EF1	S of Au Gres	Arenac	MI	44.016°N 83.7057°W	01:14–01:16	0.92 mi (1.48 km)	50 yd (46 m)
EF1	Dozens of mature trees were snapped or uprooted.						

== September ==
Confirmed tornadoes by Enhanced Fujita rating
EFU	EF0	EF1	EF2	EF3	EF4	EF5	Total
1	58	46	3	0	0	0	108

=== September 1 event ===
List of confirmed tornadoes – Saturday, September 1, 2018
EF#	Location	County / Parish	State	Start Coord.	Time (UTC)	Path length	Max width
EF0	SE of Ute Mountain	Taos	NM	36.91°N 105.64°W	20:15–20:30	0.33 mi (0.53 km)	20 yd (18 m)
EF0	A Facebook user posted a video of a landspout tornado.						
EF0	WSW of Hickory Corners	Barry	MI	42.4286°N 85.4502°W	23:08–23:10	0.4 mi (0.64 km)	100 yd (91 m)
EF0	Several trees were snapped, some of which fell on a home.						
EF0	ESE of Morley	Mecosta	MI	43.48°N 85.36°W	23:46–23:47	0.75 mi (1.21 km)	100 yd (91 m)
EF0	A prefabricated house was destroyed, and numerous trees were damaged. A large propane tank and a large wood oven were dragged around 20 ft (6.1 m).						
EF0	Jackson	Jackson	MI	42.2289°N 84.4358°W	00:12–00:20	1.5 mi (2.4 km)	225 yd (206 m)
EF0	Several trees were snapped, some of which fell on homes.						
EF0	SW of Laingsburg	Clinton	MI	42.86°N 84.400°W	00:35–00:45	4 mi (6.4 km)	100 yd (91 m)
EF0	Damage was concentrated to a few hilltops.						

=== September 2 event ===
List of confirmed tornadoes – Sunday, September 2, 2018
EF#	Location	County / Parish	State	Start Coord.	Time (UTC)	Path length	Max width
EFU	S of Lubbock	Lubbock	TX	33.47°N 101.88°W	21:57–21:58	0.05 mi (0.080 km)	30 yd (27 m)
EFU	Many residents observed a brief landspout tornado.						

=== September 3 event ===
List of confirmed tornadoes – Monday, September 3, 2018
EF#	Location	County / Parish	State	Start Coord.	Time (UTC)	Path length	Max width
EF0	NE of Berwyn	Cook	IL	41.8693°N 87.7457°W	19:14–19:18	1.71 mi (2.75 km)	75 yd (69 m)
EF0	Mainly minor tree damage was observed.						
EF0	SSW of Vinton	Benton	IA	42.0913°N 92.0572°W	21:40–21:41	0.01 mi (0.016 km)	15 yd (14 m)
EF0	A brief tornado caused no evident damage.						
EF0	SSE of Vinton	Benton	IA	42.1087°N 92.0092°W	21:45–21:46	0.01 mi (0.016 km)	15 yd (14 m)
EF0	A brief tornado caused no evident damage.						
EF1	NW of Alburnett	Linn	IA	42.1721°N 91.6619°W	22:31–22:46	4.98 mi (8.01 km)	100 yd (91 m)
EF1	Trees, crops, and the side of one house were damaged.						
EF0	SW of Prairieburg	Linn	IA	42.2279°N 91.45°W	23:08–23:09	0.01 mi (0.016 km)	15 yd (14 m)
EF0	Law enforcement reported a brief tornado.						
EF1	Cedar Rapids	Linn	IA	41.9709°N 91.7393°W	02:08–02:14	2.18 mi (3.51 km)	30 yd (27 m)
EF1	A garage was destroyed, large trees and power poles were snapped or uprooted, and the roofs of homes suffered minor damage.						

=== September 4 event ===
List of confirmed tornadoes – Tuesday, September 4, 2018
EF#	Location	County / Parish	State	Start Coord.	Time (UTC)	Path length	Max width
EF1	W of Algona	Kossuth	IA	43.0429°N 94.3374°W	20:35–20:37	1.23 mi (1.98 km)	50 yd (46 m)
EF1	A hog confinement building had its roof damaged.						
EF1	N of Rushford	Fillmore, Winona	MN	43.8443°N 91.7903°W	21:05–21:12	5.14 mi (8.27 km)	50 yd (46 m)
EF1	One home and some trees were damaged.						

=== September 5 event ===
Event was associated with Tropical Storm Gordon.

List of confirmed tornadoes – Wednesday, September 5, 2018
EF#	Location	County / Parish	State	Start Coord.	Time (UTC)	Path length	Max width
EF0	S of Kilmichael	Montgomery	MS	33.3586°N 89.5788°W	20:49–20:50	0.14 mi (0.23 km)	25 yd (23 m)
EF0	Small pieces of debris and leaves were lofted into the air.						

=== September 6 event ===
Event was associated with Tropical Storm Gordon.

List of confirmed tornadoes – Thursday, September 6, 2018
EF#	Location	County / Parish	State	Start Coord.	Time (UTC)	Path length	Max width
EF0	Caesar	Hancock	MS	30.5432°N 89.5351°W	20:09–20:12	0.6 mi (0.97 km)	30 yd (27 m)
EF0	Several large sections of shingles were ripped from the roofs of two manufactured homes, and skirting was torn in many places on one of them. A satellite dish mounted to a pole was thrown to the ground, and a small plywood shed was destroyed.						

=== September 8 event ===
Events were associated with Tropical Storm Gordon.

List of confirmed tornadoes – Saturday, September 8, 2018
EF#	Location	County / Parish	State	Start Coord.	Time (UTC)	Path length	Max width
EF0	NNW of Tell City	Perry	IN	37.9652°N 86.7697°W	19:38–19:44	1.75 mi (2.82 km)	80 yd (73 m)
EF0	Minor roof damage occurred. An amateur radio tower was bent, a rotted tree fell onto the roof of a garage, and a shed and carport were lifted.						
EF1	Stanley	Daviess	KY	37.8113°N 87.2577°W	20:51–20:57	2.23 mi (3.59 km)	200 yd (180 m)
EF1	Several homes sustained damage to their siding and fascia, a few had their steel roofs torn away, and one home had its east side wall nearly completely blown out. Corn and tobacco crops were flattened, and several dozen trees were snapped or uprooted.						
EF0	E of Sorgho	Daviess	KY	37.7532°N 87.2179°W	21:00–21:03	0.62 mi (1.00 km)	50 yd (46 m)
EF0	Drone footage indicated mainly crop damage.						
EF1	SE of Maceo	Daviess	KY	37.854°N 86.9853°W	21:30–21:31	0.44 mi (0.71 km)	25 yd (23 m)
EF1	A home suffered minor soffit damage, and a few trees were snapped along the short path.						
EF0	Newtonville	Spencer	IN	38.0008°N 86.9434°W	21:36–21:37	0.02 mi (0.032 km)	25 yd (23 m)
EF0	Video of a brief tornado was relayed over social media.						
EF0	SSW of Lewisport	Hancock	KY	37.8969°N 86.8838°W	22:42–22:54	5 mi (8.0 km)	50 yd (46 m)
EF0	Several trees and branches were snapped mid-way up. The metal roof of a barn sustained minor damage.						

=== September 9 event ===
List of confirmed tornadoes – Sunday, September 9, 2018
EF#	Location	County / Parish	State	Start Coord.	Time (UTC)	Path length	Max width
EF0	N of Gladstone	Union	NM	36.38°N 103.99°W	20:15–20:18	0.2 mi (0.32 km)	50 yd (46 m)
EF0	A trained storm spotter reported a tornado over open country.						

=== September 13 event ===
Events were associated with Hurricane Florence.

List of confirmed tornadoes – Thursday, September 13, 2018
EF#	Location	County / Parish	State	Start Coord.	Time (UTC)	Path length	Max width
EF1	Swanquarter	Hyde	NC	35.3998°N 76.2894°W	15:04–15:13	3.18 mi (5.12 km)	250 yd (230 m)
EF1	A few trees were snapped or uprooted.						
EF1	Lowland	Pamlico	NC	35.3215°N 76.5837°W	15:23–15:26	1.27 mi (2.04 km)	250 yd (230 m)
EF1	Several trees were snapped or uprooted, and a utility pole was destroyed.						
EF1	Havelock	Craven	NC	34.925°N 76.8060°W	23:51–23:55	0.57 mi (0.92 km)	250 yd (230 m)
EF1	A large swath of trees were snapped.						

=== September 14 event ===
Events were associated with Hurricane Florence.

List of confirmed tornadoes – Friday, September 14, 2018
EF#	Location	County / Parish	State	Start Coord.	Time (UTC)	Path length	Max width
EF0	S of Merry Hill	Bertie	NC	35.96°N 76.75°W	14:03–14:04	0.57 mi (0.92 km)	50 yd (46 m)
EF0	Tree damage was reported.						
EF1	NW of Davis	Carteret	NC	34.8524°N 76.5645°W	14:57–15:03	2.74 mi (4.41 km)	150 yd (140 m)
EF1	A farm outbuilding was completely demolished and four large silos were pushed inward. A fifth silo was destroyed and moved off its foundation.						
EF1	Southern Davis	Carteret	NC	34.7925°N 76.4652°W	15:58–16:05	9.33 mi (15.02 km)	150 yd (140 m)
EF1	Roofs sustained minor damage such as shingle loss. Numerous trees were snapped or uprooted.						
EF1	Otway	Carteret	NC	34.7745°N 76.5536°W	17:12–17:19	8.18 mi (13.16 km)	200 yd (180 m)
EF1	Minor shingle damage was inflicted to several homes. Numerous trees were snapped or uprooted.						
EF0	Deep Run	Lenoir	NC	35.1454°N 77.6619°W	01:12–01:26	8.97 mi (14.44 km)	150 yd (140 m)
EF0	Several homes suffered minor roof damage, and many trees were snapped.						
EF0	W of Trenton	Jones	NC	35.052°N 77.5145°W	01:40–01:50	8 mi (13 km)	125 yd (114 m)
EF0	Several trees were uprooted, and minor shingle damage was observed.						
EF1	NE of Stella	Carteret, Jones	NC	34.7704°N 77.0973°W	02:28–02:40	4.5 mi (7.2 km)	300 yd (270 m)
EF1	Dozens of trees were snapped or uprooted.						

=== September 15 event ===
Events were associated with Hurricane Florence.

List of confirmed tornadoes – Saturday, September 15, 2018
EF#	Location	County / Parish	State	Start Coord.	Time (UTC)	Path length	Max width
EF1	Camp Lejeune	Onslow	NC	34.6243°N 77.2362°W	07:00–07:05	2.5 mi (4.0 km)	275 yd (251 m)
EF1	An open small building was damaged, and dozens of trees were snapped or uprooted.						
EF0	Hampstead	Pender	NC	34.3466°N 77.6978°W	15:45–15:47	0.49 mi (0.79 km)	40 yd (37 m)
EF0	A weak tornado snapped trees, flipped a boat onto a car, and damaged a detached garage. A boat dock was flipped as well.						
EF1	SW of Murraysville	New Hanover	NC	34.2912°N 77.8335°W	23:16–23:18	0.6 mi (0.97 km)	50 yd (46 m)
EF1	Dozens of trees were snapped or uprooted; several trees fell onto homes.						
EF0	Porters Neck	New Hanover	NC	34.2955°N 77.7814°W	01:29–01:31	0.22 mi (0.35 km)	50 yd (46 m)
EF0	A couple dozen trees were snapped or uprooted.						
EF1	Atkinson	Pender	NC	34.5391°N 78.1793°W	02:41–02:42	0.39 mi (0.63 km)	50 yd (46 m)
EF1	A tornado broke numerous tree limbs and blew the roof of a camper before lifting. It touched down again shortly thereafter, briefly lifting a mobile home off the ground after its tie-down straps broke. A shed on the property was destroyed.						

=== September 16 event ===
Events were associated with Hurricane Florence.

List of confirmed tornadoes – Sunday, September 16, 2018
EF#	Location	County / Parish	State	Start Coord.	Time (UTC)	Path length	Max width
EF0	Bayshore	New Hanover	NC	34.2759°N 77.7979°W	04:02–04:07	1.3 mi (2.1 km)	50 yd (46 m)
EF0	Several large trees were uprooted, and a home suffered significant roof damage.						
EF1	Eastern Wilmington	New Hanover	NC	34.2176°N 77.9007°W	04:42–04:47	2.92 mi (4.70 km)	50 yd (46 m)
EF1	Numerous trees were twisted or uprooted.						
EF1	S of Silver Lake	New Hanover, Brunswick	NC	34.1161°N 77.9231°W	04:48–04:58	4.45 mi (7.16 km)	50 yd (46 m)
EF1	Approximately 15-20 trees were snapped.						
EF0	ENE of Silver Lake	New Hanover	NC	34.15°N 77.90°W	05:51–05:52	0.17 mi (0.27 km)	30 yd (27 m)
EF0	Tree limbs were broken and a vehicle was damaged.						
EF0	ESE of Winnabow	Brunswick	NC	34.14°N 78.06°W	11:24–11:25	0.09 mi (0.14 km)	40 yd (37 m)
EF0	About a dozen small pine trees were snapped.						
EF0	S of Castle Hayne	New Hanover	NC	34.31°N 77.9°W	16:09–16:10	0.1 mi (0.16 km)	30 yd (27 m)
EF0	Several hardwood trees were snapped above the ground.						
EF0	Myrtle Beach	Horry	SC	33.7°N 78.87°W	16:16–16:17	0.09 mi (0.14 km)	15 yd (14 m)
EF0	A waterspout moved ashore.						
EF0	Myrtle Beach	Horry	SC	33.7201°N 78.8751°W	16:17–16:19	0.41 mi (0.66 km)	30 yd (27 m)
EF0	The tops of pine trees were damaged.						
EF0	ENE of Floydale	Dillon	SC	34.3341°N 79.3216°W	16:26–16:27	0.24 mi (0.39 km)	30 yd (27 m)
EF0	Several tree limbs were snapped.						
EF0	WSW of Raemon	Robeson	NC	34.62°N 79.43°W	19:35–19:36	0.14 mi (0.23 km)	30 yd (27 m)
EF0	Law enforcement observed a tornado in a field.						
EF0	E of Dillon	Dillon	SC	34.4676°N 79.3357°W	19:48–19:58	2.78 mi (4.47 km)	30 yd (27 m)
EF0	Several trees had their limbs snapped.						
EF0	NE of Rowland	Robeson	NC	34.5789°N 79.2565°W	20:29–20:30	0.23 mi (0.37 km)	50 yd (46 m)
EF0	Numerous trees were damaged, some severely.						
EF0	N of Hamer	Dillon	SC	34.5073°N 79.3487°W	21:59–22:01	0.71 mi (1.14 km)	30 yd (27 m)
EF0	Large tree limbs were snapped.						
EF0	ESE of Goretown	Horry	SC	34.01°N 78.76°W	01:16–01:17	0.14 mi (0.23 km)	30 yd (27 m)
EF0	Spotty tree damage and damage to a roof was observed.						
EF1	NE of Tabor City	Columbus	NC	34.1801°N 78.8078°W	02:38–02:39	0.27 mi (0.43 km)	100 yd (91 m)
EF1	Dozens of trees were snapped or uprooted, a metal carport was tossed onto a dock, and a few mobile homes sustained minor damage. The tornado damaged the roofs and fascia of two houses and, at peak intensity, ripped the metal roof off a wood-framed carport, blowing it over the barn it was attached to. A welding shop had a portion of its metal roof peeled back, and minor damage was inflicted to a wooden shed.						

=== September 17 event ===
Events were associated with Hurricane Florence.

List of confirmed tornadoes – Monday, September 17, 2018
EF#	Location	County / Parish	State	Start Coord.	Time (UTC)	Path length	Max width
EF0	Roseboro	Sampson	NC	34.903°N 78.504°W	04:19–04:32	6.29 mi (10.12 km)	1,000 yd (910 m)
EF0	A large tornado damaged trees, farm buildings, and a car dealership. Ongoing river flooding prevented surveying potential damage farther south.						
EF0	SE of Pikeville	Wayne	NC	35.4707°N 77.9517°W	07:55–07:57	0.37 mi (0.60 km)	100 yd (91 m)
EF0	Several outbuildings were destroyed and a home suffered minor structural damage.						
EF0	W of Elm City	Wilson	NC	35.797°N 77.868°W	11:06–11:08	0.91 mi (1.46 km)	350 yd (320 m)
EF0	A short-lived tornado produced damage mainly to trees and under brush, though uprooted trees fell on several cars and structures.						
EF0	N of Boydton	Mecklenburg	VA	36.684°N 78.444°W	14:35–14:50	9.15 mi (14.73 km)	100 yd (91 m)
EF0	Widespread tree damage occurred, and several houses and outbuildings suffered structural damage due to fallen trees.						
EF1	Rockville	Hanover	VA	37.711°N 77.685°W	17:33–17:38	0.69 mi (1.11 km)	100 yd (91 m)
EF1	Numerous trees were snapped or uprooted, and an open shed was completely destroyed. Numerous round bales of hay were moved into a field.						
EF1	Winterpock to Moseley	Chesterfield	VA	37.3208°N 77.7684°W	18:46–19:08	8.79 mi (14.15 km)	150 yd (140 m)
EF1	Homes along the path sustained damage to shingles, siding, and garage doors. One home sustained partial uplift of its roof. Many trees were snapped or uprooted as well.						
EF1	Western Richmond to Tuckahoe	Richmond (C), Henrico	VA	37.53°N 77.58°W	19:32–19:42	4 mi (6.4 km)	100 yd (91 m)
EF1	Numerous trees were snapped or uprooted, and air conditioning units were blown off a church.						
EF2	W of Pocahontas State Park to Bon Air	Chesterfield	VA	37.4065°N 77.6107°W	19:38–19:56	7.5 mi (12.1 km)	350 yd (320 m)
EF2	1 death – This strong tornado caused significant damage in the Midlothian area. A Gabe's store sustained considerable damage, including collapse of its roof. Other businesses were also damaged, including a furniture store that had roof and exterior wall loss. A storage facility was damaged, vehicles were flipped, and a flooring warehouse completely collapsed, killing an employee inside. Homes along the path were damaged as well, with a few sustaining partial loss of roofs or exterior walls. Numerous large trees were snapped or uprooted, some of which landed on structures. Sixteen people were injured.						
EF0	S of Genito	Powhatan	VA	37.44°N 77.85°W	19:55–19:58	0.69 mi (1.11 km)	75 yd (69 m)
EF0	Trees uprooted and tree limbs were snapped by this brief tornado.						
EF0	Western Richmond	Richmond (C)	VA	37.5272°N 77.4973°W	20:05–20:06	0.25 mi (0.40 km)	75 yd (69 m)
EF0	Numerous trees were snapped by this brief tornado.						
EF0	Northern Richmond	Richmond (C)	VA	37.5278°N 77.4537°W	20:14–20:16	1.3 mi (2.1 km)	75 yd (69 m)
EF0	Numerous trees and several power poles were snapped.						
EF0	Windsor Farms	Richmond (C)	VA	37.5372°N 77.4909°W	20:23–20:26	1.38 mi (2.22 km)	75 yd (69 m)
EF0	Trees were snapped and uprooted along the path.						
EF0	NE of Atlee	Hanover	VA	37.6601°N 77.4107°W	20:26–20:27	0.5 mi (0.80 km)	50 yd (46 m)
EF0	Broadcast media relayed public video of a brief tornado.						
EF0	NE of Bon Air	Richmond (C)	VA	37.537°N 77.5451°W	20:57–21:00	1.05 mi (1.69 km)	75 yd (69 m)
EF0	Numerous trees and several power poles were snapped in the Forest Hill area.						

=== September 19 event ===
List of confirmed tornadoes – Wednesday, September 19, 2018
EF#	Location	County / Parish	State	Start Coord.	Time (UTC)	Path length	Max width
EF0	NNW of Stratton	Hitchcock	NE	40.243°N 101.2862°W	23:20–23:22	0.01 mi (0.016 km)	200 yd (180 m)
EF0	A trained storm spotter reported a landspout tornado.						

=== September 20 event ===
List of confirmed tornadoes in the United States – Thursday, September 20, 2018
EF#	Location	County / Parish	State	Start Coord.	Time (UTC)	Path length	Max width
EF1	NE of Middlefield	Geauga	OH	41.5017°N 81.068°W	18:23–18:31	3.18 mi (5.12 km)	25 yd (23 m)
EF1	A building under construction suffered significant damage and tree limbs were snapped. Outbuildings and a house sustained minor damage as well.						
EF1	NE of Middlefield	Geauga, Trumbull	OH	41.4814°N 81.0206°W	18:31–18:41	4.11 mi (6.61 km)	25 yd (23 m)
EF1	Two single-wide mobile homes were significantly damaged. Otherwise, damage was confined to trees.						
EF1	Superior	Dickinson, Emmet	IA	43.4238°N 94.9899°W	22:21–22:28	5.07 mi (8.16 km)	35 yd (32 m)
EF1	Trees were damaged in town, and a garage was destroyed. A two-story office building at the Superior Ethanol plant sustained major roof damage, broken windows, and partial exterior wall failure on the second floor. A weather station at the plant measured a 99 mph (159 km/h) wind gust. Crops were damaged as well.						
EF1	Northern Granada to S of Huntley	Martin, Faribault	MN	43.698°N 94.353°W	22:52–22:59	6.48 mi (10.43 km)	220 yd (200 m)
EF1	This tornado touched down in Granada, where a house had its roof blown off, a small and unanchored home was shifted off its foundation and leveled, trees were downed, garages were destroyed, and other homes sustained roof damage. East of town, trees were snapped and sheet metal was strewn through fields.						
EF0	Garden City	Blue Earth	MN	44.0432°N 94.1665°W	22:58–23:00	1.15 mi (1.85 km)	70 yd (64 m)
EF0	A weak tornado struck Garden City, downing trees at the fairgrounds. Outside of town, soybean fields were damaged and additional trees were downed.						
EF0	SW of Skyline	Blue Earth	MN	44.1155°N 94.0785°W	23:04–23:05	0.84 mi (1.35 km)	70 yd (64 m)
EF0	A weak tornado caused minor tree damage. A house sustained roof damage from a falling tree.						
EF1	Lake Elysian	Waseca	MN	44.1401°N 93.7612°W	23:19–23:25	7.13 mi (11.47 km)	440 yd (400 m)
EF1	A house sustained roof loss and total destruction of its garage. The home owner was thrown from the garage into his yard, and sustained minor injuries. Outbuildings were damaged, a grain bin was thrown into a field. Other homes sustained minor damage, and trees were damaged as well.						
EF0	E of Janesville	Waseca	MN	44.1186°N 93.6027°W	23:20–23:21	0.73 mi (1.17 km)	20 yd (18 m)
EF0	High-resolution satellite imagery confirmed a brief tornado through corn fields.						
EF1	SSW of Waseca	Waseca	MN	43.9926°N 93.6634°W	23:20–23:30	10.88 mi (17.51 km)	300 yd (270 m)
EF1	A tornado damaged trees and a silo along its path.						
EF1	SE of Elysian to NE of Waterville	Waseca, Le Sueur	MN	44.1816°N 93.6305°W	23:25–23:32	7.17 mi (11.54 km)	330 yd (300 m)
EF1	This tornado struck Waterville, where numerous trees were downed, many of which landed on homes. A one-story home had a large section of its roof torn off as well. Outside of town, tree limbs were snapped.						
EF1	Eastern Waseca to SW of Medford	Waseca, Steele	MN	44.0797°N 93.4774°W	23:28–23:37	11.13 mi (17.91 km)	350 yd (320 m)
EF1	A silo and a grain bin were both destroyed. A few sheds and outbuildings, as well as many trees and crops, were damaged.						
EF2	Southeastern Morristown	Rice	MN	44.2098°N 93.4504°W	23:31–23:36	4.94 mi (7.95 km)	300 yd (270 m)
EF2	This strong tornado touched down in the southeastern part of Morristown, and caused high-end EF2 damage as it impacted residential areas. Many trees were snapped and numerous homes were badly damaged, some of which lost roofs and exterior walls. One home was left with only a few walls standing. The tornado continued to the northeast outside of town, where a turkey barn and outbuildings were destroyed. Crops were damaged as well.						
EF1	N of Morristown to NE of Roberds Lake	Rice	MN	44.2527°N 93.438°W	23:35–23:44	8.57 mi (13.79 km)	440 yd (400 m)
EF1	Many outbuildings were destroyed, and numerous trees were snapped or uprooted along the path. A shed was crushed by a large tree.						
EF1	Owatonna	Steele	MN	44.0595°N 93.332°W	23:35–23:42	8.12 mi (13.07 km)	300 yd (270 m)
EF1	Southwest of town, crops and trees were damaged and a barn was destroyed. In Owatonna, power poles and power lines were snapped, a large factory building sustained minor exterior damage, homes had shingles ripped off, and many trees were snapped or uprooted, some of which landed on homes.						
EF2	Northwestern Faribault	Rice	MN	44.3036°N 93.3448°W	23:37–23:40	2.95 mi (4.75 km)	600 yd (550 m)
EF2	Significant damage occurred at the Faribault Airport, where several hangars were destroyed and roughly 80 airplanes were damaged or destroyed. The footings of one hangar were ripped from its frame. Hundreds of trees were downed, and outbuildings were damaged as well.						
EF1	Roberds Lake	Rice	MN	44.3336°N 93.3628°W	23:40–23:42	1.57 mi (2.53 km)	150 yd (140 m)
EF1	Numerous trees were snapped or uprooted, some of which landed on homes and cabins. Outbuildings were destroyed, and one home sustained broken windows and considerable roof damage.						
EF1	N of Medford to E of Faribault	Rice	MN	44.1965°N 93.2379°W	23:40–23:47	9.06 mi (14.58 km)	500 yd (460 m)
EF1	Outbuildings, grain bins, machine sheds, and silos were damaged or destroyed along the path. Homes had portions of their roofs torn off, and many trees were snapped or uprooted.						
EF1	S of Nerstrand	Rice, Goodhue	MN	44.2466°N 93.1307°W	23:44–23:50	7.17 mi (11.54 km)	300 yd (270 m)
EF1	A few sheds and outbuildings, as well as numerous corn and soy bean fields, were damaged. A silo lost a roof panel.						
EF1	N of Faribault	Rice	MN	44.351°N 93.2657°W	23:44–23:48	4.66 mi (7.50 km)	440 yd (400 m)
EF1	Numerous large trees were damaged along the path.						
EF1	S of Dundas	Rice	MN	44.3649°N 93.3035°W	23:45–23:50	5.75 mi (9.25 km)	440 yd (400 m)
EF1	This tornado damaged power poles and trees, twisted road signs, and left a convergent pattern in a corn field.						
EF0	Dundas	Rice	MN	44.4013°N 93.293°W	23:46–23:51	5.53 mi (8.90 km)	75 yd (69 m)
EF0	Pine trees were uprooted and billboards were destroyed to the southwest of town. In Dundas, numerous trees were snapped or uprooted.						
EF1	SE of Northfield	Rice, Goodhue	MN	44.4149°N 93.1268°W	23:52–23:57	5.31 mi (8.55 km)	550 yd (500 m)
EF1	A pizza restaurant housed in a large barn was leveled by this high-end EF1 tornado. Other outbuildings were damaged or destroyed, and trees were damaged.						
EF0	S of Wanamingo	Goodhue	MN	44.2672°N 92.9006°W	23:56–00:05	8.72 mi (14.03 km)	250 yd (230 m)
EF0	Corn crop was damaged, and tree limbs were snapped, some of which pierced the roof of a machine shed.						
EF1	Southern Cannon Falls	Goodhue	MN	44.4771°N 92.9206°W	00:01–00:03	1.86 mi (2.99 km)	440 yd (400 m)
EF1	Numerous trees were snapped or uprooted, with many falling on homes and vehicles.						
EF0	N of Cannon Falls	Dakota, Goodhue	MN	44.5419°N 92.9688°W	00:02–00:05	3.19 mi (5.13 km)	70 yd (64 m)
EF0	Roofing material was removed from a commercial facility, and a convergent pattern was noted in crops.						
EF0	S of New Trier	Dakota	MN	44.5829°N 92.975°W	00:04–00:08	4.61 mi (7.42 km)	220 yd (200 m)
EF0	Outbuildings were damaged at several farms.						
EF0	NE of Zumbrota	Goodhue, Wabasha	MN	44.3353°N 92.6512°W	00:09–00:14	6.22 mi (10.01 km)	150 yd (140 m)
EF0	This tornado struck several farms, destroying grain bins and outbuildings.						
EF0	Prairie Island	Goodhue, Pierce	MN, WI	44.6382°N 92.6787°W	00:16–00:19	3.23 mi (5.20 km)	100 yd (91 m)
EF0	This brief, weak tornado caused minor damage.						
EF0	E of Ellsworth	Pierce	WI	44.7318°N 92.4738°W	00:27–00:29	1.67 mi (2.69 km)	140 yd (130 m)
EF0	A barn, sheds, trees and outbuildings were damaged.						

=== September 21 event ===
List of confirmed tornadoes – Friday, September 21, 2018
EF#	Location	County / Parish	State	Start Coord.	Time (UTC)	Path length	Max width
EF1	NNE of Springbrook	Jackson	IA	42.2042°N 90.4678°W	06:27–06:28	0.3 mi (0.48 km)	20 yd (18 m)
EF1	Trees were snapped and uprooted, a power pole was broken, and a roof was damaged.						

=== September 24 event ===
List of confirmed tornadoes – Monday, September 24, 2018
EF#	Location	County / Parish	State	Start Coord.	Time (UTC)	Path length	Max width
EF0	SW of Woodbury	Cannon	TN	35.7861°N 86.16°W	21:19–21:21	0.4 mi (0.64 km)	30 yd (27 m)
EF0	An old barn was destroyed, and three homes suffered roof damage, two severely. Several trees were downed.						

=== September 25 event ===
List of confirmed tornadoes – Tuesday, September 25, 2018
EF#	Location	County / Parish	State	Start Coord.	Time (UTC)	Path length	Max width
EF0	WNW of Winfield	Henry	IA	41.1436°N 91.4886°W	18:26–18:27	0.27 mi (0.43 km)	20 yd (18 m)
EF0	Trees and corn were damaged.						
EF1	S of Alburnett	Linn	IA	42.1338°N 91.6186°W	18:30–18:31	0.12 mi (0.19 km)	20 yd (18 m)
EF1	Trees were snapped and uprooted at a farmstead.						
EF0	S of Mechanicsville	Cedar	IA	41.8852°N 91.2590°W	18:53–18:54	0.05 mi (0.080 km)	20 yd (18 m)
EF0	Two grain bins and some corn were lofted.						
EF1	NW of Winfield	Henry	IA	41.1559°N 91.4563°W	19:14–19:16	1.05 mi (1.69 km)	200 yd (180 m)
EF1	Trees were damaged, some of which further inflicted damage to homes.						
EF1	Frenchtown Township	Monroe	MI	41.9562°N 83.4321°W	00:23–00:32	4.32 mi (6.95 km)	520 yd (480 m)
EF1	Roofing material was ripped from homes and windows were blown out. Many trees were damaged or uprooted, and garage doors were blown in.						
EF0	Rockwood	Monroe, Wayne	MI	42.0356°N 83.264°W	00:45–00:52	4.08 mi (6.57 km)	250 yd (230 m)
EF0	Multiple trees were damaged and a home lost some of its shingles.						
EF1	Gibraltar	Wayne	MI	42.0914°N 83.2059°W	00:55–01:02	3.27 mi (5.26 km)	200 yd (180 m)
EF1	Multiple trees were damaged, a roof was partially blown off, and powerlines were downed.						
EF1	WNW of Clarkrange	Fentress	TN	36.19°N 85.0795°W	04:53–04:54	0.5 mi (0.80 km)	50 yd (46 m)
EF1	A brief tornado shifted an outbuilding off its foundation, inflicted severe roof damage to two barns, and destroyed a windmill.						

=== September 26 event ===
List of confirmed tornadoes – Wednesday, September 26, 2018
EF#	Location	County / Parish	State	Start Coord.	Time (UTC)	Path length	Max width
EF1	Columbus	Franklin	OH	39.9564°N 82.9702°W	09:53–09:57	3.73 mi (6.00 km)	150 yd (140 m)
EF1	Numerous trees were snapped or uprooted, causing significant damage to homes, garages, and vehicles. A pickup truck was partially lifted off the ground and power poles were damaged. Two cinder block garages had their roofs completely ripped off and sustained collapse of exterior walls. Several homes suffered roof, siding, and shingle damage as well.						

== October ==
Confirmed tornadoes by Enhanced Fujita rating
EFU	EF0	EF1	EF2	EF3	EF4	EF5	Total
2	69	35	6	0	0	0	106

=== October 2 event ===
List of confirmed tornadoes – Tuesday, October 2, 2018
EF#	Location	County / Parish	State	Start Coord.	Time (UTC)	Path length	Max width
EF2	Southeastern Conneautville	Crawford	PA	41.7531°N 80.3561°W	18:33–18:42	4.1 mi (6.6 km)	50 yd (46 m)
EF2	A strong tornado struck a nursing home at the southeast edge of town, breaking windows and causing major roof damage to the main building at the facility. A separate duplex had its roof torn off and sustained collapse of one exterior wall. East of town, large trees were snapped and uprooted, and an outbuilding was damaged before the tornado dissipated. One person sustained minor injuries.						
EF1	NE of Blooming Valley	Crawford	PA	41.7276°N 80.0345°W	19:05–19:10	3.5 mi (5.6 km)	75 yd (69 m)
EF1	Numerous trees were snapped or uprooted, and one home suffered substantial roof damage.						
EF1	N of Steuben Township	Crawford	PA	41.692°N 79.8419°W	19:32–19:37	3 mi (4.8 km)	25 yd (23 m)
EF1	Trees were snapped or uprooted, and a barn was damaged.						
EF1	S of Freehold Township	Warren	PA	41.9347°N 79.4407°W	19:43–19:45	0.84 mi (1.35 km)	75 yd (69 m)
EF1	Dozens of trees were snapped or uprooted, and a concrete chimney attached to a home was blown over.						
EF1	Stony Point	Rockland	NY	41.2389°N 74.0499°W	20:14–20:18	2.12 mi (3.41 km)	100 yd (91 m)
EF1	Numerous trees were downed and snapped.						
EF1	New Castle	Westchester	NY	41.2023°N 73.8108°W	20:44–20:58	4.28 mi (6.89 km)	300 yd (270 m)
EF1	Numerous trees were downed and snapped. Some roof shingles were damaged.						
EF2	S of Hartsfield	Lycoming	PA	41.5450°N 77.1782°W	21:03–21:08	2.17 mi (3.49 km)	300 yd (270 m)
EF2	Hundreds of trees were snapped or uprooted, and a few outbuildings were destroyed.						
EF0	Brookville	Jefferson	PA	41.166°N 79.121°W	21:03–21:13	4.81 mi (7.74 km)	50 yd (46 m)
EF0	Minor to moderate tree damage was observed.						
EF0	E of Brandy Camp	Elk	PA	41.33°N 78.6298°W	21:05–21:06	0.17 mi (0.27 km)	20 yd (18 m)
EF0	Several trees were downed.						
EF1	NE of Graysville	Greene	PA	39.945°N 80.396°W	21:26–21:28	1.67 mi (2.69 km)	200 yd (180 m)
EF1	A home lost its roof decking and fascia. Several outbuildings were destroyed while another damage to its metal roofing. Numerous trees were snapped or uprooted.						
EF1	New Canaan to Norwalk	Fairfield	CT	41.1363°N 73.5031°W	21:29–21:41	3.76 mi (6.05 km)	100 yd (91 m)
EF1	Damage was mainly confined to trees and cars, including along the Merritt Parkway.						
EF2	Baxter to S of Brookville	Jefferson	PA	41.142°N 79.168°W	21:33–21:41	4.09 mi (6.58 km)	200 yd (180 m)
EF2	Numerous trees were snapped or uprooted, two homes lost their roofs and fascia, and approximately 100 granite gravestones were overturned at a cemetery. One gravestone was rolled five times and displaced 15 ft (4.6 m).						
EF1	Unity Township	Westmoreland	PA	40.244°N 79.530°W	21:37–21:39	0.94 mi (1.51 km)	150 yd (140 m)
EF1	Numerous trees were snapped or uprooted. This tornado moved north in an east-moving thunderstorm, far removed from the typical hook echo region.						
EF0	Hempfield Township	Westmoreland	PA	40.211°N 79.560°W	21:38–21:40	0.76 mi (1.22 km)	250 yd (230 m)
EF0	Many trees were snapped or uprooted.						
EF2	Donegal Township	Westmoreland	PA	40.143°N 79.399°W	21:55–21:59	1.56 mi (2.51 km)	250 yd (230 m)
EF2	A large swath of trees was flattened in a convergent pattern as this tornado moved through a heavily forested area.						
EF0	Western Spring Brook Township	Lackawanna	PA	41.3170°N 75.6767°W	22:01–22:02	0.1 mi (0.16 km)	50 yd (46 m)
EF0	Numerous trees were snapped and uprooted.						
EF0	Eastern Spring Brook Township	Lackawanna	PA	41.3106°N 75.6243°W	22:11–22:12	0.15 mi (0.24 km)	75 yd (69 m)
EF0	The roof was ripped off a barn, and several trees were downed.						
EF0	Mansfield	Tolland	CT	41.7612°N 72.1966°W	22:12–22:13	0.4 mi (0.64 km)	30 yd (27 m)
EF0	Several shingles were blown off a roof and trees were downed.						
EF1	Lake Harmony	Carbon	PA	41.0484°N 75.6049°W	22:37–22:38	1.01 mi (1.63 km)	40 yd (37 m)
EF1	Numerous trees were snapped and uprooted.						
EF1	Jackson Township	Monroe	PA	41.0158°N 75.4114°W	23:01–23:02	1.41 mi (2.27 km)	50 yd (46 m)
EF1	Numerous trees were snapped and uprooted. A large tree limb landed on a roof and downed power lines.						
EF0	Ronkonkoma	Suffolk	NY	40.8221°N 73.1446°W	03:20–03:22	0.22 mi (0.35 km)	200 yd (180 m)
EF0	Numerous homes suffered damage to their siding, gutters, and outside furniture. Two or three trees were downed onto cars.						

=== October 3 event ===
List of confirmed tornadoes – Wednesday, October 3, 2018
EF#	Location	County / Parish	State	Start Coord.	Time (UTC)	Path length	Max width
EF0	Mattoon	Shawano	WI	44.9865°N 89.0458°W	00:08–00:09	0.99 mi (1.59 km)	25 yd (23 m)
EF0	Trees were damaged.						
EF0	E of Center Junction	Jones	IA	42.1156°N 91.0731°W	02:59–03:00	0.7 mi (1.1 km)	50 yd (46 m)
EF0	Corn was flattened and tree branches were snapped.						

=== October 7 event ===
List of confirmed tornadoes – Sunday, October 7, 2018
EF#	Location	County / Parish	State	Start Coord.	Time (UTC)	Path length	Max width
EFU	N of Dimmitt	Castro	TX	34.61°N 102.39°W	19:31–19:49	8.65 mi (13.92 km)	200 yd (180 m)
EFU	A motorist observed a cone tornado over open farmland.						
EF0	SW of Hobart	Kiowa	OK	34.6191°N 98.9998°W	21:22	0.1 mi (0.16 km)	10 yd (9.1 m)
EF0	Storm chasers observed a brief landspout tornado.						
EF0	ENE of Cooperton	Kiowa	OK	34.904°N 98.6623°W	22:10	0.1 mi (0.16 km)	10 yd (9.1 m)
EF0	Storm chasers observed a brief tornado.						
EF0	W of Davis	Murray, Garvin	OK	34.501°N 97.166°W	22:38–22:39	1 mi (1.6 km)	20 yd (18 m)
EF0	Tree limbs were damaged.						
EF0	Fairfax	Osage	OK	36.5690°N 96.7083°W	00:46–00:50	1.5 mi (2.4 km)	225 yd (206 m)
EF0	The roofs and windows of several businesses were damaged. Several homes suffered roof damage, power poles were downed, and trees were snapped or uprooted.						

=== October 8 event ===
List of confirmed tornadoes – Monday, October 8, 2018
EF#	Location	County / Parish	State	Start Coord.	Time (UTC)	Path length	Max width
EF0	SE of Hamlin	Brown	KS	39.8453°N 95.6301°W	21:19–21:23	3.12 mi (5.02 km)	75 yd (69 m)
EF0	A farmstead was damaged.						
EFU	NNE of Gomez	Terry	TX	33.205°N 102.3703°W	22:02–22:07	0.52 mi (0.84 km)	30 yd (27 m)
EFU	A storm chaser documented a tornado over cotton fields.						
EF0	N of McCamey	Upton	TX	31.1887°N 102.2303°W	22:15	0.05 mi (0.080 km)	50 yd (46 m)
EF0	A fire department observed a brief tornado.						
EF0	NW of Pickering	Nodaway	MO	40.4605°N 94.9081°W	22:54–22:56	2.18 mi (3.51 km)	50 yd (46 m)
EF0	Powerlines and trees were downed.						
EF0	ESE of Newtown	Sullivan	MO	40.3515°N 93.2249°W	23:02–23:03	0.82 mi (1.32 km)	25 yd (23 m)
EF0	A brief tornado was videoed.						
EF0	S of Jamaica	Guthrie	IA	41.7965°N 94.4064°W	23:22–23:32	5.91 mi (9.51 km)	100 yd (91 m)
EF0	A damage track was observed in fields of corn.						
EF1	N of Woodburn	Clarke	IA	41.0715°N 93.609°W	00:53–01:01	4.92 mi (7.92 km)	250 yd (230 m)
EF1	Numerous trees were snapped or uprooted, one of which landed on a mobile home and resulted in a minor injury. Several large feeding troughs were tossed as far as 0.25 mi (0.40 km).						

=== October 9 event ===
List of confirmed tornadoes – Tuesday, October 9, 2018
EF#	Location	County / Parish	State	Start Coord.	Time (UTC)	Path length	Max width
EF1	Marietta	Love	OK	33.932°N 97.125°W	12:58–12:59	1 mi (1.6 km)	100 yd (91 m)
EF1	One home lost its roof. The roofs of other homes were partially damaged or damaged by fallen trees.						
EF0	Northeastern Oklahoma City	Oklahoma	OK	35.493°N 97.491°W	13:24–13:25	1 mi (1.6 km)	10 yd (9.1 m)
EF0	Trees and power lines were damaged.						
EF1	Tinker Air Force Base to SSW of Jones	Oklahoma	OK	35.433°N 97.404°W	13:28–13:46	10 mi (16 km)	20 yd (18 m)
EF1	An aircraft maintenance office suffered significant roof damage. Other damage was more localized.						
EF0	Lake Thunderbird	Cleveland	OK	35.206°N 97.301°W	13:30–13:34	3.5 mi (5.6 km)	50 yd (46 m)
EF0	A waterspout developed over Lake Thunderbird.						
EF1	NE of Norman	Cleveland	OK	35.301°N 97.324°W	13:31–13:33	2.5 mi (4.0 km)	40 yd (37 m)
EF1	Several homes were damaged, including one with significant roof damage. Many trees were snapped or damaged.						
EF0	SE of Edmond	Oklahoma	OK	35.592°N 97.436°W	13:33–13:42	6.25 mi (10.06 km)	70 yd (64 m)
EF0	Power poles, fences, and trees were damaged.						
EF0	Choctaw	Oklahoma	OK	35.491°N 97.264°W	13:42–13:48	4.6 mi (7.4 km)	20 yd (18 m)
EF0	An outbuilding and some trees were damaged.						
EF0	Southern Prague	Lincoln	OK	35.48°N 96.687°W	14:37	0.2 mi (0.32 km)	10 yd (9.1 m)
EF0	Trees were damaged and at least one car was flipped.						
EF0	N of Knoxville	Ray, Caldwell	MO	39.4852°N 94.0184°W	19:58–20:02	4.03 mi (6.49 km)	50 yd (46 m)
EF0	A few trees were downed.						
EF0	SW of Centerville	Appanoose	IA	40.6832°N 92.9032°W	20:24–20:27	1.63 mi (2.62 km)	60 yd (55 m)
EF0	A brief tornado touched down at the Centerville Airport, causing sheet metal damage to the walls and roof of an airport hangar.						
EF0	S of Rathbun	Appanoose	IA	40.7712°N 92.879°W	20:34–20:35	0.45 mi (0.72 km)	20 yd (18 m)
EF0	Trained storm spotters reported a brief tornado that caused no damage.						
EF1	ENE of Wiederkehr Village	Johnson	AR	35.4932°N 93.7045°W	20:35–20:36	0.2 mi (0.32 km)	50 yd (46 m)
EF1	Trees were uprooted and a piece of roofing was removed from a shed.						
EF1	NE of Wiederkehr Village	Johnson	AR	35.5039°N 93.7046°W	20:37–20:39	1.2 mi (1.9 km)	100 yd (91 m)
EF1	Mainly tree damage was observed.						
EF0	E of Blairstown	Benton	IA	41.9°N 92.08°W	20:48–20:49	0.01 mi (0.016 km)	10 yd (9.1 m)
EF0	A brief tornado was observed in a field by a broadcast meteorologist.						
EF0	SW of Malcom	Poweshiek	IA	41.6452°N 92.625°W	21:14–21:18	1.17 mi (1.88 km)	40 yd (37 m)
EF0	A trained storm spotter reported a tornado over agricultural land.						
EF0	W of Spickard	Grundy	MO	40.2414°N 93.6386°W	21:17	0.02 mi (0.032 km)	25 yd (23 m)
EF0	Minor tree damage occurred.						
EF0	SE of Tama	Poweshiek, Tama	IA	41.8585°N 92.4882°W	21:20–21:25	2.28 mi (3.67 km)	30 yd (27 m)
EF0	Only minor crop damage was observed.						
EF0	S of Clearfield	Ringgold	IA	40.7331°N 94.4586°W	21:35–21:41	3.13 mi (5.04 km)	40 yd (37 m)
EF0	High-resolution satellite imagery confirmed a tornado over open cropland.						
EF1	W of Creston	Union	IA	41.0281°N 94.4204°W	22:09–22:15	2.3 mi (3.7 km)	250 yd (230 m)
EF1	A garage was removed from its foundation and severely damaged, a mobile home had significant portions of its roof removed, and several trees suffered major damage.						
EF0	E of Janesville	Black Hawk, Bremer	IA	42.6204°N 92.4104°W	22:21–22:25	1.9 mi (3.1 km)	50 yd (46 m)
EF0	Trees, crops, and shingles were damaged.						
EF0	NE of Orient	Adair	IA	41.1984°N 94.3208°W	22:42–22:47	3.05 mi (4.91 km)	40 yd (37 m)
EF0	High-resolution satellite imagery confirmed a tornado that damaged crops, if anything.						
EF0	NE of Greenfield	Adair	IA	41.3645°N 94.3187°W	22:58–23:01	1.57 mi (2.53 km)	30 yd (27 m)
EF0	Minor tree damage was documented.						
EF1	S of Stuart	Adair	IA	41.4046°N 94.3143°W	23:03–23:08	2.71 mi (4.36 km)	80 yd (73 m)
EF1	Outbuildings and trees were damaged.						

=== October 10 event ===
Events were associated with Hurricane Michael.

List of confirmed tornadoes – Wednesday, October 10, 2018
EF#	Location	County / Parish	State	Start Coord.	Time (UTC)	Path length	Max width
EF0	Camp Blanding	Bradford	FL	29.84°N 82.05°W	19:05–19:20	9.97 mi (16.05 km)	25 yd (23 m)
EF0	Law enforcement reported a tornado.						
EF0	Fort Valley	Peach	GA	32.4955°N 83.8795°W	19:32–19:36	1.8 mi (2.9 km)	100 yd (91 m)
EF0	A few pine trees were snapped.						
EF1	S of Roberta	Crawford	GA	32.6525°N 84.0267°W	19:58–20:07	5 mi (8.0 km)	250 yd (230 m)
EF1	A high-end EF1 tornado snapped or uprooted numerous trees, many of which inflicted structural damage to homes. A detached workshop was also destroyed after its doors were left open.						
EF0	SW of Atlanta	Fulton	GA	33.7179°N 84.4126°W	22:33–22:37	1.14 mi (1.83 km)	100 yd (91 m)
EF0	Several large trees were snapped.						
EF0	SW of Sarasota	Sarasota	FL	27.31°N 82.5767°W	22:35–22:36	0.02 mi (0.032 km)	20 yd (18 m)
EF0	A waterspout was videoed moving ashore near Lido Beach before dissipating.						
EF0	W of Branchville	Orangeburg	SC	33.2505°N 80.8285°W	03:17–03:20	1.25 mi (2.01 km)	25 yd (23 m)
EF0	Minor tree damage occurred.						
EF0	Rowesville	Orangeburg	SC	33.3314°N 80.8457°W	03:28–03:37	6.3 mi (10.1 km)	25 yd (23 m)
EF0	Non-continuous tree damage was observed.						
EF0	NW of Brookdale	Orangeburg	SC	33.5016°N 80.8805°W	03:48–04:01	7.71 mi (12.41 km)	50 yd (46 m)
EF0	Non-continuous tree damage was observed.						

=== October 11 event ===
Events were associated with Hurricane Michael.

List of confirmed tornadoes – Thursday, October 11, 2018
EF#	Location	County / Parish	State	Start Coord.	Time (UTC)	Path length	Max width
EF0	Eastover	Richland	SC	33.8058°N 80.6386°W	08:22–08:30	6.01 mi (9.67 km)	50 yd (46 m)
EF0	Many trees were uprooted.						
EF1	Burkeville	Nottoway	VA	37.1853°N 78.1795°W	21:10–21:12	1.35 mi (2.17 km)	175 yd (160 m)
EF1	Two restaurants and some mobile homes suffered damage, and the roof was blown off an auto body shop. Trees were snapped.						
EF1	Mannboro	Amelia	VA	37.2382°N 77.8593°W	21:27–21:29	1.62 mi (2.61 km)	150 yd (140 m)
EF1	Numerous trees were downed, some of which fell on homes. A two-story home was slightly shifted off its foundation, with significant uplift of its roof. A garage was collapsed.						
EF0	Lanexa	New Kent	VA	37.3822°N 76.9038°W	23:02–23:03	1.86 mi (2.99 km)	150 yd (140 m)
EF0	Several trees were downed and four homes were damaged.						
EF0	Achilles	Gloucester	VA	37.2574°N 76.4343°W	23:22–23:23	0.95 mi (1.53 km)	150 yd (140 m)
EF0	A waterspout moved ashore, downing numerous trees.						
EF1	Toano	James City	VA	37.3529°N 76.7703°W	23:23–23:25	2.09 mi (3.36 km)	200 yd (180 m)
EF1	Several trees were downed, one of which fell through a house. A roof was blown off a home.						
EF0	Pampa	Gloucester	VA	37.5235°N 76.6093°W	23:47–23:48	2.8 mi (4.5 km)	100 yd (91 m)
EF0	Numerous trees were downed.						
EF0	Jamaica	Middlesex	VA	37.7224°N 76.7115°W	00:13–00:14	0.26 mi (0.42 km)	50 yd (46 m)
EF0	Numerous trees were downed.						

=== October 13 event ===
Events were associated with the remnants of Hurricane Sergio.

List of confirmed tornadoes – Saturday, October 13, 2018
EF#	Location	County / Parish	State	Start Coord.	Time (UTC)	Path length	Max width
EF2	WSW of Christoval	Tom Green	TX	31.1749°N 100.6599°W	11:56–12:04	3.01 mi (4.84 km)	644 yd (589 m)
EF2	The roof of a metal building was largely ripped off, and a large garage door was blown out, causing the steel perlins to buckle. Numerous trees were uprooted or snapped at their trunks.						
EF0	Brady	McCulloch	TX	31.1184°N 99.3422°W	15:17–15:20	0.53 mi (0.85 km)	200 yd (180 m)
EF0	A tree was uprooted while a second fell onto a home. Several others had their limbs snapped. Some roof damage was noted.						
EF0	Waxahachie	Ellis	TX	32.4282°N 96.8961°W	17:47–17:48	0.46 mi (0.74 km)	60 yd (55 m)
EF0	A small tornado formed at Waxahachie High School, damaging the window and bay door to the corner of a gymnasium. Cars were sled and had their windows blown out. Three parking lot lights were bent to the ground, and three handicap signs were also flattened. A small, empty school trailer was tossed about 50 yd (46 m).						
EF0	S of Hillsboro	Hill	TX	31.9523°N 97.1283°W	17:52	0.46 mi (0.74 km)	50 yd (46 m)
EF0	A few homes suffered shingle and fence damage. Trees were also damaged.						
EF1	SE of Hillsboro	Hill	TX	31.9641°N 97.0938°W	18:02–18:03	1.62 mi (2.61 km)	100 yd (91 m)
EF1	One home lost its roof deck while a second lost a substantial portion of its roof, deck, walls, and windows. A small storage shed was destroyed, and RV trailer and small boat were damaged and tossed, and trees were damaged.						
EF0	NNE of Bynum	Hill	TX	32.0181°N 96.9781°W	18:13–18:15	0.3 mi (0.48 km)	50 yd (46 m)
EF0	Some trees were damaged.						
EF0	Drane	Navarro	TX	32.0451°N 96.5944°W	18:50–18:51	0.51 mi (0.82 km)	50 yd (46 m)
EF0	A storm spotter observed a tornado.						
EF0	Richland-Chambers Reservoir	Navarro	TX	32.0394°N 96.2368°W	19:13	1.09 mi (1.75 km)	150 yd (140 m)
EF0	A waterspout was observed by members of the public.						
EF0	NW of Buffalo	Freestone	TX	31.4927°N 96.1307°W	21:03–21:06	4.14 mi (6.66 km)	60 yd (55 m)
EF0	Some tree damage was observed. Chasers reported power flashes at the time as well.						
EF0	SW of Beckville	Panola	TX	32.1707°N 94.5491°W	22:19–22:21	1.31 mi (2.11 km)	40 yd (37 m)
EF0	Several trees were snapped or uprooted.						
EF0	NNE of Quartzsite	La Paz	AZ	33.71°N 114.18°W	23:59–00:05	0.01 mi (0.016 km)	50 yd (46 m)
EF0	A landspout tornado was observed by a trained storm spotter. No damage occurred.						
EF0	N of Dome	Yuma	AZ	32.86°N 114.36°W	00:22–00:27	0.14 mi (0.23 km)	50 yd (46 m)
EF0	A trained storm spotter reported a tornado. No damage occurred.						

=== October 20 event ===
List of confirmed tornadoes – Saturday, October 20, 2018
EF#	Location	County / Parish	State	Start Coord.	Time (UTC)	Path length	Max width
EF0	Western Seneca	Erie	NY	42.8061°N 78.76°W	17:47–17:48	0.16 mi (0.26 km)	75 yd (69 m)
EF0	Multiple trees were snapped or downed. A condominium building suffered damage to its facade, windows, and shutters.						

=== October 21 event ===
List of confirmed tornadoes – Sunday, October 21, 2018
EF#	Location	County / Parish	State	Start Coord.	Time (UTC)	Path length	Max width
EF0	NW of Winslow	Coconino	AZ	35.1°N 110.97°W	21:06–21:15	1.7 mi (2.7 km)	20 yd (18 m)
EF0	A trained storm spotter reported a well-developed landspout tornado.						

=== October 23 event ===
List of confirmed tornadoes – Tuesday, October 23, 2018
EF#	Location	County / Parish	State	Start Coord.	Time (UTC)	Path length	Max width
EF1	Northern Providence to Lincoln	Providence	RI	41.8674°N 71.468°W	19:31–19:34	1.5 mi (2.4 km)	250 yd (230 m)
EF1	Numerous trees were snapped or uprooted. Large tree branches were downed, some of which fell on cars and fences. Shingles were blown off several houses.						
EF1	Hardwick	Worcester	MA	42.339°N 72.2267°W	20:03–20:06	0.8 mi (1.3 km)	350 yd (320 m)
EF1	More than 150 trees were either snapped or uprooted. Shingles were ripped from the roof of an old abandoned gas station, and the metal cover to a pump was blown off.						
EF1	Norton	Bristol	MA	41.9628°N 71.1987°W	20:13–20:15	0.8 mi (1.3 km)	170 yd (160 m)
EF1	Numerous trees were snapped or uprooted. One felled tree caused severe damage to a garage and more minor damage to a home.						
EF0	Hubbardston	Worcester	MA	42.4763°N 71.9972°W	20:26–20:29	1 mi (1.6 km)	100 yd (91 m)
EF0	Dozens of trees were snapped or uprooted. Some siding was ripped from a building, and a few telephone poles were snapped at their tops as well.						
EF0	Glendale	Maricopa	AZ	33.5184°N 112.2621°W	23:15–23:25	3.73 mi (6.00 km)	100 yd (91 m)
EF0	A landspout tornado was widely observed; it caused no damage.						

=== October 28 event ===
List of confirmed tornadoes – Sunday, October 28, 2018
EF#	Location	County / Parish	State	Start Coord.	Time (UTC)	Path length	Max width
EF0	Northern Portland	Multnomah	OR	45.5893°N 122.6772°W	21:57–22:06	1.15 mi (1.85 km)	20 yd (18 m)
EF0	Three semi-truck trailers were overturned, a building suffered minor roof damage, and trees were damaged as well.						
EF0	S of Nelsonville	Athens	OH	39.4155°N 82.2582°W	22:10–22:11	1.48 mi (2.38 km)	40 yd (37 m)
EF0	A trampoline was tossed into powerlines and some loose pieces of sheet metal were tossed in the air. Trees were snapped or uprooted, one of which penetrated the roof of a home, and a metal carport was tossed into nearby woods.						

=== October 29 event ===
List of confirmed tornadoes – Monday, October 29, 2018
EF#	Location	County / Parish	State	Start Coord.	Time (UTC)	Path length	Max width
EF1	Fishers Island	Suffolk	NY	41.2548°N 71.9983°W	11:35–11:41	1.96 mi (3.15 km)	100 yd (91 m)
EF1	Trees were downed, a small shed was knocked over, and homes were damaged from branches.						
EF0	Stonington	New London	CT	41.4107°N 71.8688°W	11:58–12:03	2.33 mi (3.75 km)	100 yd (91 m)
EF0	Trees were downed and uprooted.						
EF0	Woods Hole	Barnstable	MA	41.533°N 70.6639°W	13:58–13:59	0.1 mi (0.16 km)	10 yd (9.1 m)
EF0	Four large wooden chairs were tossed onto a tennis court 500 ft (150 m) away at the Woods Hole Golf Club. A weather station recorded a peak wind gust of 65 mph (105 km/h).						
EF0	NNW of Forest Grove	Washington	OR	45.5586°N 123.1386°W	21:17–21:18	0.07 mi (0.11 km)	20 yd (18 m)
EF0	Multiple greenhouse structures were damaged, including the westernmost building which suffered damage to its galvanized steel pipe and base. Very minor tree damage was observed.						
EF0	NE of Jefferson	Marion	OR	44.7348°N 122.9666°W	22:30–22:31	0.1 mi (0.16 km)	10 yd (9.1 m)
EF0	Multiple small trees were downed, and a sign was knocked over, although it's inconclusive whether this was a result of the tornado itself.						

=== October 31 event ===
List of confirmed tornadoes – Wednesday, October 31, 2018
EF#	Location	County / Parish	State	Start Coord.	Time (UTC)	Path length	Max width
EF0	Eagle Lake	Colorado	TX	29.5354°N 96.2906°W	19:56–20:00	1.4 mi (2.3 km)	100 yd (91 m)
EF0	A tornado was videoed over open fields. It caused no damage.						
EF1	SE of Rineyville	Hardin	KY	37.7268°N 85.9759°W	21:39–21:43	2.5 mi (4.0 km)	80 yd (73 m)
EF1	Numerous homes suffered roof and siding damage. Several outbuildings were heavily damaged or destroyed. A large travel trailer was pushed onto a minivan, a trampoline was tossed, and numerous trees were snapped or uprooted.						
EF1	Cushing	Nacogdoches	TX	31.8025°N 94.8477°W	23:48–23:52	1.5 mi (2.4 km)	100 yd (91 m)
EF1	A trampoline and an above ground pool were both flipped, and a mobile home's frame was damaged. Half of a sheet metal roof was ripped from a home, and the cross section of a power pole was snapped. In total, about 16 structures and 50 trees were damaged in town.						
EF1	Evadale	Hardin, Jasper	TX	30.3585°N 94.0958°W	00:47–00:55	2.09 mi (3.36 km)	189 yd (173 m)
EF1	Several homes in Evadale had their roofs damaged, and several trees were snapped. The walls of a metal building were blown out.						
EF0	S of Buna	Jasper	TX	30.4032°N 93.9711°W	01:01–01:03	0.67 mi (1.08 km)	150 yd (140 m)
EF0	Minor tree damage occurred.						
EF1	E of Buna	Jasper, Newton	TX	30.4303°N 93.9111°W	01:10–01:22	8.52 mi (13.71 km)	260 yd (240 m)
EF1	Trees and the roof of a home sustained damage.						
EF1	SE of DeRidder	Beauregard	LA	30.7193°N 93.2022°W	02:40–02:43	1.47 mi (2.37 km)	280 yd (260 m)
EF1	Several trees were snapped.						
EF0	Angleton	Brazoria	TX	29.17°N 95.43°W	02:54–02:55	0.08 mi (0.13 km)	30 yd (27 m)
EF0	The overhead doors of a firehouse were blown in, and a vehicle inside sustained broken windows. Significant tree damage was observed on the property.						
EF1	NW of Cove	Chambers	TX	29.8268°N 94.821°W	02:57–03:00	0.38 mi (0.61 km)	100 yd (91 m)
EF1	A large trailer was overturned and rolled, a power pole was snapped, and several homes suffered minor roof damage. Numerous trees were snapped and uprooted.						
EF1	SE of Singer to NW of Dry Creek	Beauregard	LA	30.6066°N 93.3325°W	04:27–04:44	16.35 mi (26.31 km)	600 yd (550 m)
EF1	Outbuildings were damaged while trees and power poles were snapped. A part of one house sustained damage.						
EF2	Alexandria to NW of Jena	Rapides, Grant, La Salle	LA	31.247°N 92.4784°W	04:29–05:26	37.89 mi (60.98 km)	500 yd (460 m)
EF2	This strong and long-tracked tornado touched down in Alexandria, ripping the roof off a restaurant, collapsing an exterior wall at a bowling alley, and severely damaging the roofs of several other businesses. Moving through neighboring Pineville, the tornado downed many trees and power lines, including at the Louisiana College campus. Some trees landed on homes and vehicles. The tornado continued into Grant Parish at high-end EF2 strength, obliterating an anchored mobile home and inflicting injuries to two occupants. The iron frame of the structure was thrown a couple hundred yards. A vehicle trailer was lifted and pushed around a tree. In LaSalle Parish, approximately 100 structures were damaged to various degrees and multiple power poles were snapped. Two mobile homes were completely destroyed in this area, including a double-wide mobile home was lifted, flipped, and thrown about 100 yd (91 m). Trees were snapped and roofs were damaged in the town of Trout before the tornado dissipated.						
EF1	SW of Sugartown	Beauregard	LA	30.8151°N 93.1132°W	04:43–04:46	2.55 mi (4.10 km)	300 yd (270 m)
EF1	Several trees were snapped.						
EF1	NW of Dry Creek to NW of Mittie	Beauregard, Allen	LA	30.7091°N 93.1008°W	04:43–04:53	10.05 mi (16.17 km)	500 yd (460 m)
EF1	Numerous trees and power lines were snapped.						
EF1	S of Carlyss	Calcasieu	LA	30.1411°N 93.4728°W	04:50–05:00	6.49 mi (10.44 km)	900 yd (820 m)
EF1	Metal sheds were blown over, several RV's were overturned, a few roofs were ripped off, and trees were snapped.						

== See also ==
- Tornadoes of 2018
- List of United States tornadoes from June to July 2018
- List of United States tornadoes from November to December 2018
