= Tropical Storm Gordon (2018) =

Atlantic tropical storm

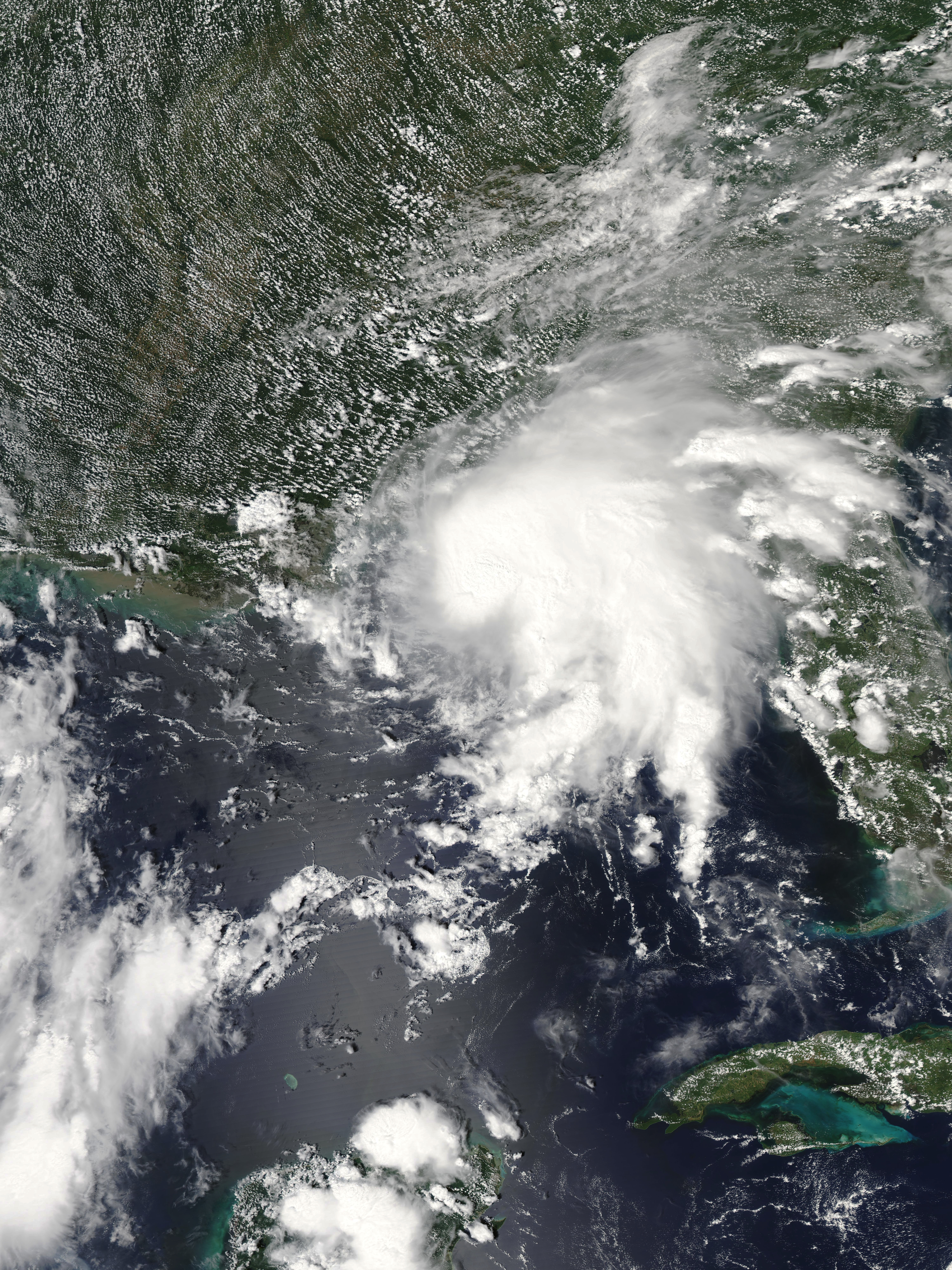
- Tropical Storm Gordon near peak intensity just off the coast of Alabama on September 4

Meteorological history
- Formed: September 3, 2018
- Remnant low: September 6, 2018
- Dissipated: September 8, 2018

Tropical storm
- 1-minute sustained (SSHWS/NWS)
- Highest winds: 70 mph (110 km/h)
- Lowest pressure: 996 mbar (hPa); 29.41 inHg

Overall effects
- Fatalities: 3 direct, 1 indirect
- Damage: $200–250 million (2018 USD)
- Areas affected: Hispaniola, Cuba, The Bahamas, South Florida, Florida Keys, Gulf Coast of the United States, Arkansas, Missouri, United States East Coast, Southern Ontario
- IBTrACS
- Part of the 2018 Atlantic hurricane season

Tropical Storm Gordon was a strong tropical storm that caused damage along the Gulf Coast of the United States in early September 2018. The seventh named storm of the 2018 Atlantic hurricane season, Gordon developed from a tropical wave that was first monitored in the Caribbean Sea on August 30. The wave moved west-northwestward toward the east coast of Florida while gradually organizing. The disturbance was marked as Potential Tropical Cyclone Seven on September 2 while near the Bahamas, and early the next day, it became Tropical Storm Gordon. The system made landfall on the southwest coast of Florida shortly afterwards. Steady intensification began after it moved off the coast of Florida and into the Gulf of Mexico. Gordon reached its peak intensity as a high-end tropical storm late on September 4 before making landfall just east of Pascagoula, Mississippi shortly afterwards. Gordon then rapidly weakened as it tracked inland, and degenerated into a remnant low on September 6. Gordon's remnants lingered over Arkansas for two days, before opening up into a low-pressure trough on September 8. At least three deaths were attributed to the storm, and Gordon caused approximately $200–250 million (2018 USD) in damages.

== Meteorological history ==
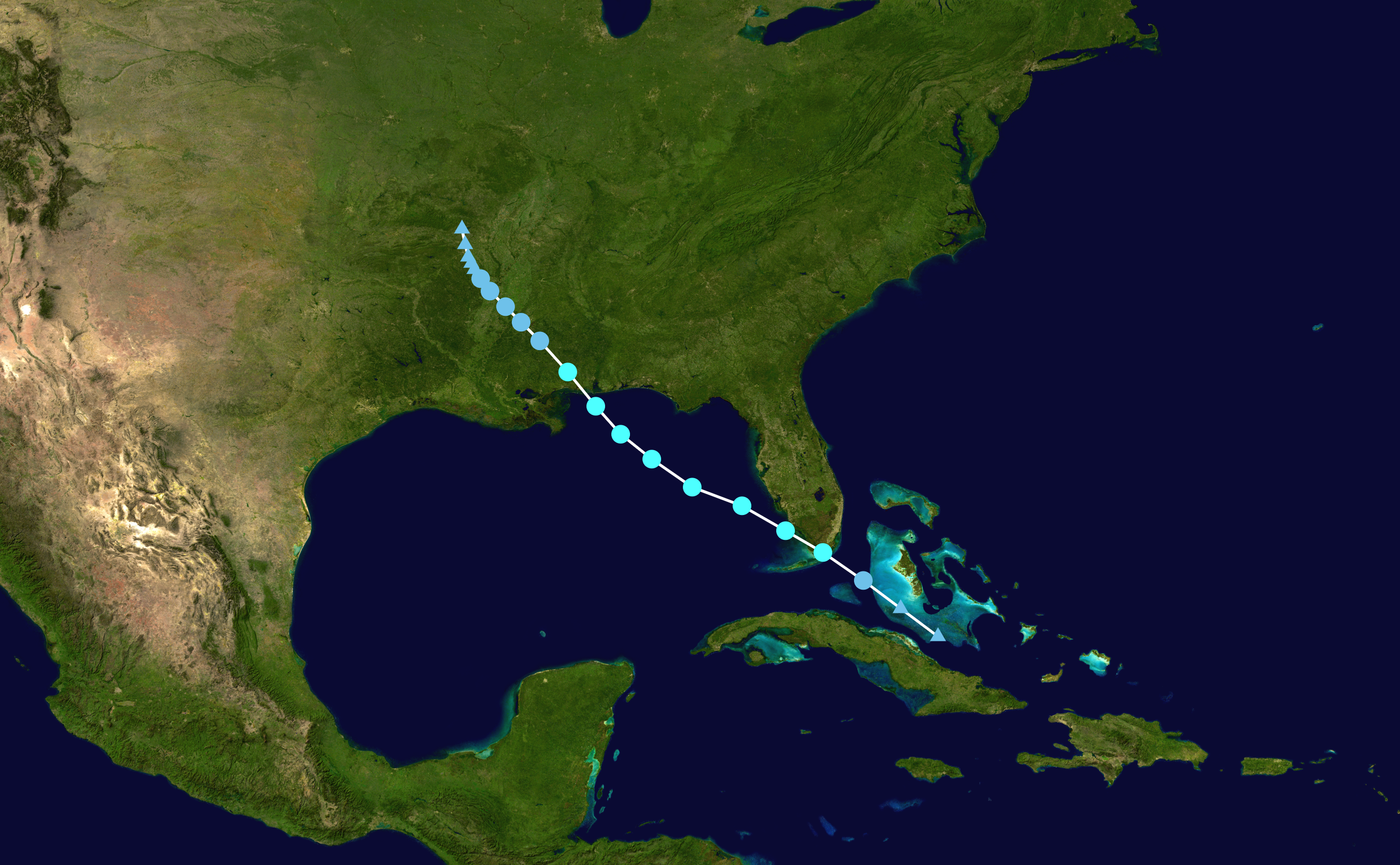
Map plotting the storm's track and intensity, according to the Saffir–Simpson scale Map key Saffir–Simpson scale Tropical depression (≤38 mph, ≤62 km/h) Tropical storm (39–73 mph, 63–118 km/h) Category 1 (74–95 mph, 119–153 km/h) Category 2 (96–110 mph, 154–177 km/h) Category 3 (111–129 mph, 178–208 km/h) Category 4 (130–156 mph, 209–251 km/h) Category 5 (≥157 mph, ≥252 km/h) Unknown Storm type Tropical cyclone Subtropical cyclone Extratropical cyclone, remnant low, tropical disturbance, or monsoon depression

Tropical Storm Gordon arose from a tropical wave that left the west coast of Africa on August 26. The wave swiftly moved westward across the low-latitudes of the Atlantic, with only a slight amplification of convection occurring within the Intertropical Convergence Zone. As the wave neared the eastern Caribbean Sea on August 30, cloud cover and shower activity increased over the northern Lesser Antilles. The National Hurricane Center (NHC) first mentioned the wave as having potential for tropical development in the evening hours of the same day. The wave split in two soon after, with the northern half generating a surface trough that covered eastern Hispaniola and the nearby Atlantic waters. Although thunderstorms linked to the system increased, strong upper-level winds hindered development over the next two days. After the winds lessened on September 2, the disturbance's convection began to show signs of organization while it was located between eastern Cuba and the central Bahamas. The convection dwindled for a short time late on the same day before rapidly increasing early on September 3. Around that time, the system was located in a favorable environment of 86 °F (30 °C) sea surface temperatures and low-to-moderate vertical wind shear. Subsequently, the system strengthened into a tropical depression around 06:00 UTC on September 3, (Note: Operationally, the National Hurricane Center began advisories on the system as Potential Tropical Cyclone Seven and never designated it as a tropical depression.) while located 90 mi (150 km) southeast of Key Largo, Florida.

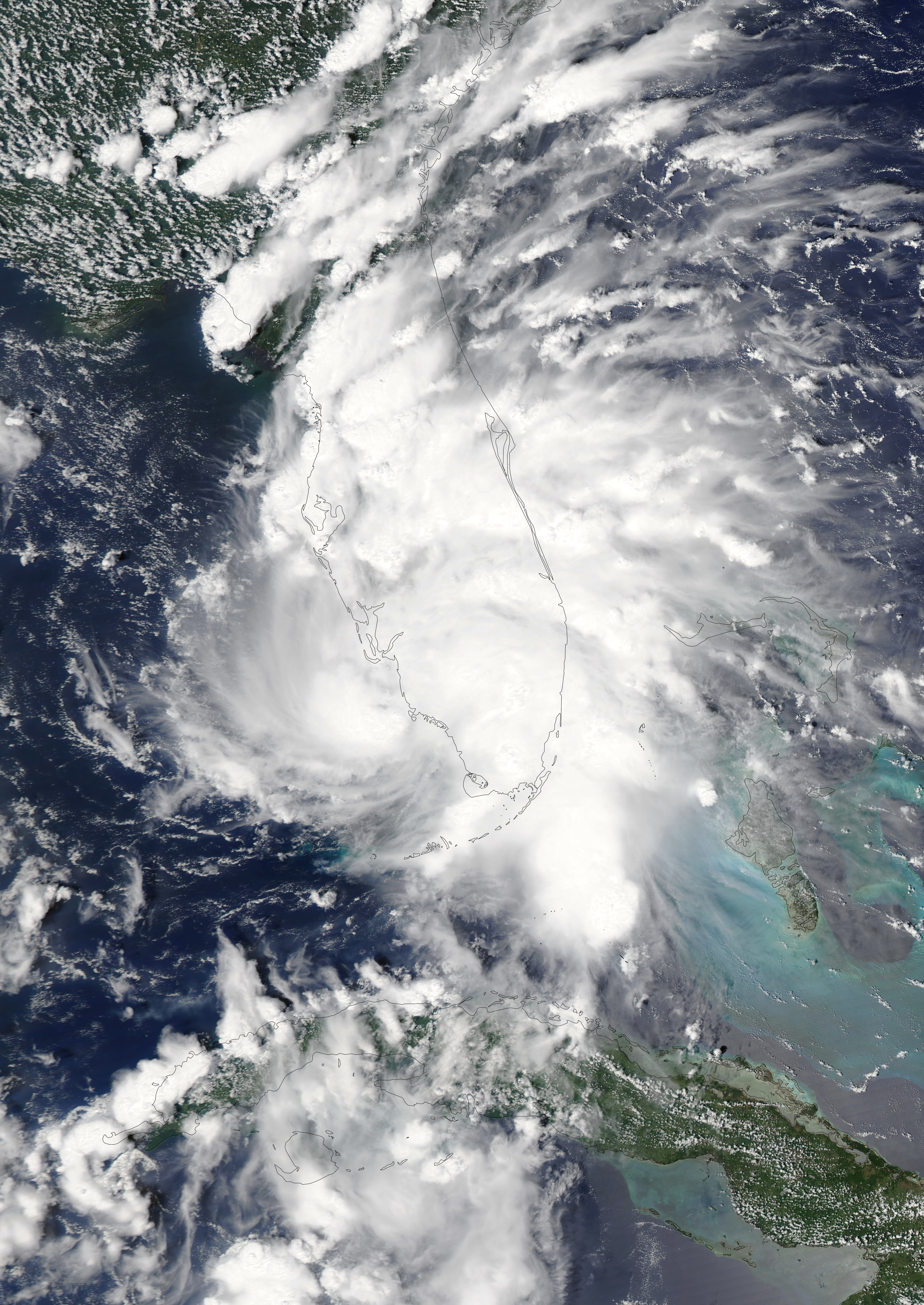
Tropical Storm Gordon hours after its second landfall in Florida on September 3

Continuing to organize, the depression quickly strengthened into Tropical Storm Gordon three hours later as its convective structure improved. Meanwhile, the system was traveling northwestward around the edge of a subtropical ridge. Gordon made landfall near Tavernier in the Florida Keys at 11:15 UTC on September 3, with maximum sustained winds of 50 mph (85 km/h). The tropical storm subsequently emerged over the Florida Bay and made a second landfall near Flamingo on the southern tip of Florida peninsula a couple of hours later, at 13:15 UTC, with the same intensity. Gordon then entered the Gulf of Mexico where additional strengthening ensued. The storm briefly displayed a 6 mi (9 km) wide eye-like feature on doppler weather radar around 18:00 UTC, while located off the coast of Marco Island; this feature disappeared a couple of hours later, however, the storm continued strengthening. Westerly wind shear temporarily disrupted the core of the system early on September 4; the low-level center was displaced to the southwestern boundary of the convection. The storm's structure primarily consisted of a compact central dense overcast with banding features over the eastern half of the system as a result of the shear. Towards the middle of September 4, Gordon began to improve in appearance, developing a band of deep convection near its distinct center; simultaneously, lightning activity increased significantly in the core of the storm.

Gordon reached its peak intensity at 18:00 UTC on September 4 as a high-end tropical storm with maximum sustained winds of 70 mph (110 km/h), while located approximately 130 mi (215 km) south-southeast of Pascagoula, Mississippi. The tropical storm's convection continued to organize around its center as it approached the coastline, however, collected surface and radar data indicated that the wind speed remained the same. Gordon achieved its minimum central pressure of 996 mbar (29.41 inHg) as it made landfall between the Alabama/Mississippi border and Pascagoula around 03:15 UTC on September 5. After landfall, Gordon quickly deteriorated, weakening into a tropical depression by 12:00 UTC, while located 35 mi (55 km) southeast of Jackson, Mississippi. Early on September 6, the depression slowed down over southeastern Arkansas while maintaining its northwestward track. The storm degenerated into a remnant low at 18:00 UTC near Pine Bluff, before further weakening into a trough of low pressure by 00:00 UTC on September 8. The remnants of Gordon combined with an extratropical low later on September 8. The new system traveled northeastward during the next few days, generating torrential rainfall over western Kentucky and the Ohio Valley, before dissipating near northern New York on September 11.

== Preparations, impact, and aftermath ==
A series of watches and warnings was issued in association with Tropical Storm Gordon. Tropical storm watches were issued for the Alabama-Florida border to Morgan City, Louisiana as well as Lake Pontchartrain and Lake Maurepas at 21:00 UTC on September 2. These watches were later upgraded to warnings at 09:00 UTC on September 3. Shortly after Gordon became a tropical storm, tropical storm warnings were issued around 12:30 UTC for Golden Beach to Bonita Beach, Florida as well as Craig Key to Ocean Reef, including Florida Bay, in the Florida Keys. A hurricane watch was issued at 15:00 UTC for the mouth of the Pearl River to the Alabama-Florida border. At the same time, a tropical storm warning was issued for the Alabama-Florida border to the Okaloosa-Walton county line. The hurricane watch was replaced with a hurricane warning around 21:00 UTC on September 3. The watches and warnings were gradually discontinued over the next few days.

=== Florida ===
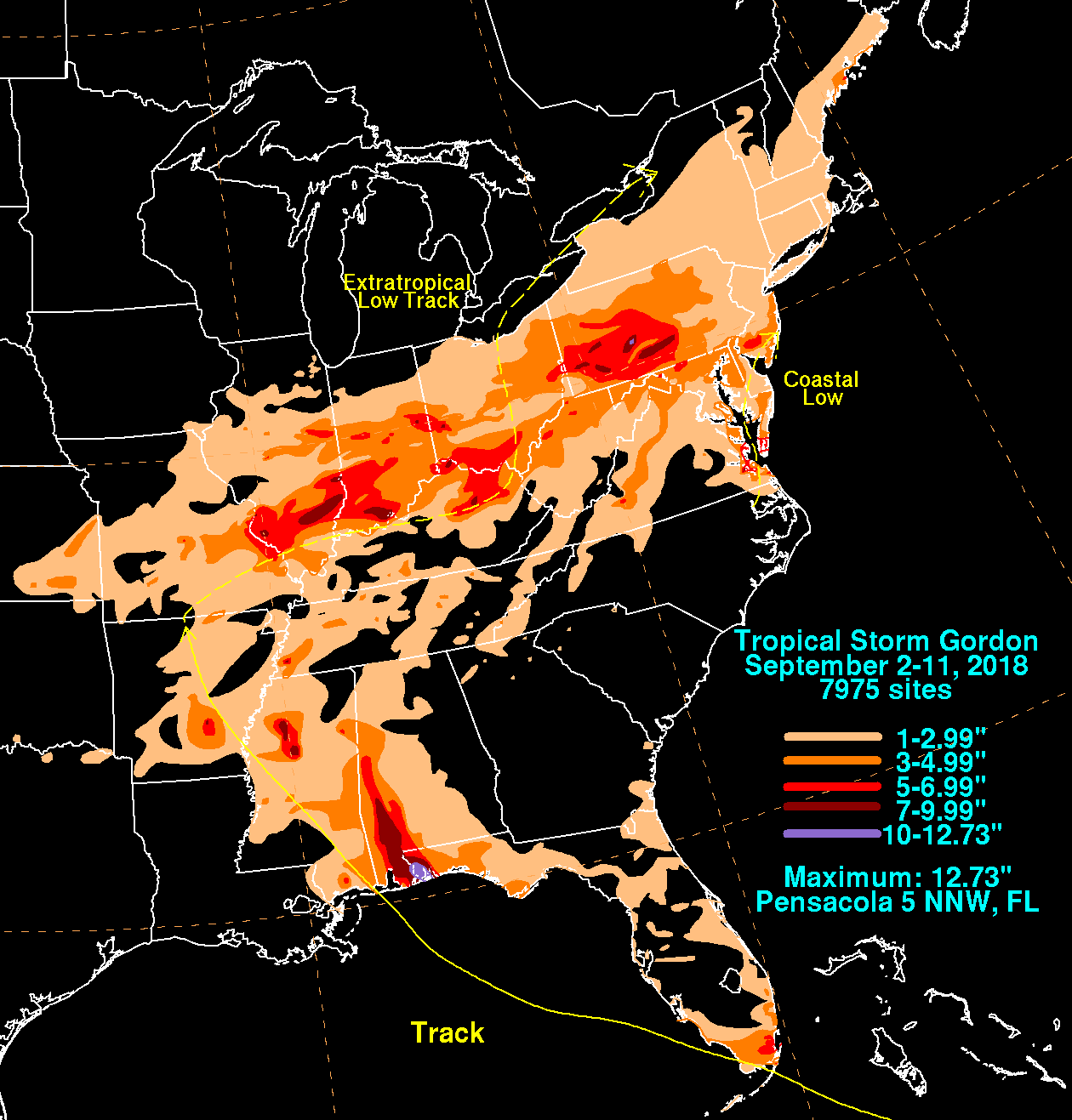
Rainfall associated with Gordon and its extratropical remnants

Tropical Storm Gordon brought gale-force winds and flooding rain to Florida and the Florida Keys. Gordon made its first landfall near Tavernier around 11:15 UTC on September 2. Overall, minor damage occurred in the Florida Keys; wind gusts up to gale-force caused a tree to fall across part of a county road located between Ocean Reef and Key Largo. The cyclone made another landfall near Flamingo at the southern tip of Florida a couple of hours later. Gordon caused torrential rainfall throughout the area, with a local peak of 6.98 in (177 mm) occurring in Homestead. Winds from the storm downed tree limbs, resulting in approximately 8,000 power outages throughout Miami-Dade and Broward counties. A 47-year-old man died on Interstate 95 in Miami after crashing his vehicle into a concrete barrier. Another crash closed lanes on the MacArthur Causeway, and a third accident halted traffic on two westbound lanes of Interstate 395 near U.S. Route 1.

Gordon also affected the Florida Panhandle, including the city of Pensacola, where the storm's peak rainfall total of 12.73 in (323.3 mm) was recorded. In advance of Gordon's landfall, adverse weather conditions prompted flight delays and cancellations at the Pensacola International Airport. A tree fell onto a mobile home in Pensacola, trapping and killing a 2-year-old girl.

Significant beach erosion occurred on the southeastern coast near Fort Lauderdale. Sizable portions of sand and numerous sea turtle nests were washed away by waves that Gordon produced; this left some sections in a barren state. Near Panama City in northwestern Florida, a large hole formed near a culvert at the Runaway Island Beach as a result of erosion. Algae blooms along the Gulf Coast of Florida spread further northwest to Tampa Bay in the days following Gordon's passage through the area. The spread killed thousands of fish, leaving carcasses floating in the water. The bloom also thickened in Fort Lauderdale, leaving "green, foul-smelling goop" in canals throughout the city.

=== Mississippi ===
On September 3, Mississippi Governor Phil Bryant issued a state of emergency as Gordon approached the state, with 50 Mississippi National Guardsmen being mobilized in preparation. A dozen casinos were shut down, though were later allowed to reopen on September 5. In Brandon, 10.15 in (258 mm) of rainfall was recorded. On September 5, an EF0 tornado was reported in Kilmichael. The next day, a second EF0 tornado was confirmed in Caesar.

=== Alabama ===
Ahead of Gordon, Alabama Governor Kay Ivey issued a state of emergency for eight counties.

A storm surge of 3–5 ft (0.9–1.5 m) struck Dauphin Island, Alabama, causing minor flooding. A one-minute sustained wind of 67 mph (108 km/h) and a peak gust of 74 mph (119 km/h) were also reported there. Homes on the island sustained roof and siding damage. Tropical-storm-force winds penetrated inland as far as Mobile Regional Airport, downing trees in areas of southern Mobile County. Farther inland, 5–8 in (130–200 mm) of rainfall caused flooding along several rivers, inundating streets and washing out dirt roads.

=== Louisiana ===
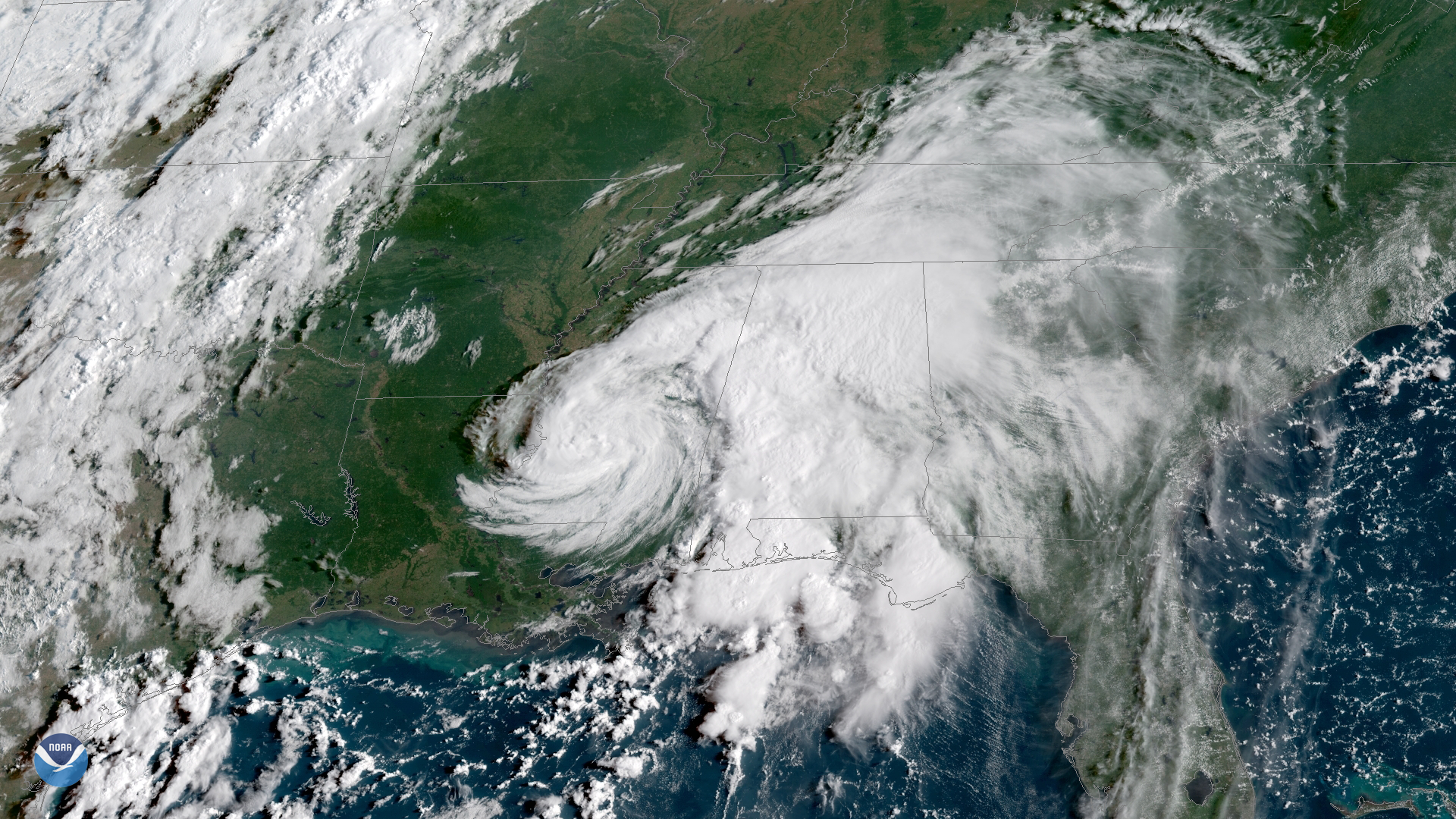
Gordon weakening over the lower Mississippi Valley on the morning of September 5

Louisiana Governor John Bel Edwards declared a state of emergency for the state, deploying 200 Louisiana National Guardsmen, 63 high-water trucks, 39 boats, and four helicopters.

=== Kentucky ===
A Louisville cab driver was killed after being trapped by floodwaters. More than 3 inches (75 mm) of rain fell in Louisville, flooding streets, stranding cars, and causing a Louisville City FC soccer match to be suspended and a University of Louisville football game to be delayed. In Morehead, a young child was swept in flood water and recovery efforts were ongoing as of September 9, 2018.

Four tornadoes were reported in Kentucky; two were rated as EF1 while the other two were classified as EF0. An EF1 tornado touched down near Stanley, nearly destroying a wall on one house and causing minor damage to others. It also deroofed multiple barns and sheds and leveled corn and tobacco crops; the total damage from the tornado was estimated at $110,000. Another EF1 tornado occurred between Maceo and Yelvington, causing $3,000 in damage to trees and the soffit of a house. An EF0 tornado near Lewisport and Adair downed tree limbs and snapped tree trunks, blocking roads and damaging the roof of a house; the tornado also damaged the metal roof of a barn. Total damage was estimated at $6,000. Approximately $5,000 in crop damage was caused by an EF0 tornado that touched down near Sorgho.

=== Missouri ===
On September 7, a Greene County Sheriff's Deputy was killed after his patrol vehicle was washed off of a rural county road at an unmarked low-water crossing at the Pomme de Terre River at the Greene County and Dallas County line during a bout of torrential rains. The deputy had been in the area responding to a 911-hang up call, likely as a result of the weather.

=== Elsewhere ===
The remnants of Gordon merged with a cold front, spawning two EF0 tornadoes in Indiana and causing heavy rainfall. The second tornado touched down near Newtonville; no damage was reported. Heavy rainfall was also observed in parts of Ohio, Illinois, and Pennsylvania, with Cincinnati reporting 4.61 inches (117 mm) of rain. Flash flooding in Dix, Illinois resulted in $400,000 in damage and one injury. Further east, Rochester, New York picked up 1.19 inches (30 mm) of rain, while a Major League Baseball game at PNC Park between the Pittsburgh Pirates and Miami Marlins was postponed.

== See also ==
- Other tropical cyclones named Gordon
- Tropical Storm Edouard (2008) – struck western Gulf Coast in early August of that year
- Tropical Storm Bonnie (2010) – weak tropical storm that moved through the Gulf
- Hurricane Isaac (2012) – affected the Gulf Coast as a Category 1 hurricane
