= Moseleyville, Kentucky =

Unincorporated community in Kentucky, United States

Coordinates: 37°39′47″N 87°11′36″W

Moseleyville
- Census-designated place
- Location within the state of Kentucky Moseleyville (the United States)
- Country: United States
- State: Kentucky
- County: Daviess

Area
  - Total: 1.07 sq mi (2.77 km^{2})
  - Land: 1.04 sq mi (2.69 km^{2})
  - Water: 0.031 sq mi (0.08 km^{2})

Population (2020)
  - Total: 470
  - Density: 451.9/sq mi (174.47/km^{2})
- Time zone: UTC-6 (Central (CST))
  - Summer (DST): UTC-5 (CST)
- ZIP code: 42301
- Area codes: 270 and 364
- FIPS code: 21-53670

Moseleyville is a census-designated place and unincorporated community located in Daviess County, Kentucky, United States. The population was 470 as of the 2020 census.

== Demographics ==
Historical population
Census	Pop.	Note	%±
2020	470		—
U.S. Decennial Census

== History ==
It was named for the Moseley family. There was a post office from 1886 to 1909.
