= Newman, Kentucky =

Unincorporated community in Kentucky, United States

Coordinates: 37°50′13″N 87°17′43″W

Newman is an unincorporated community in Daviess County, in the U.S. state of Kentucky.

== History ==
A post office called Newman was established in 1890, and remained in operation until 1973. The community may have the name of Alexander Newman, an early merchant.
