= Rome, Kentucky =

Unincorporated community in Kentucky, United States

Rome
- Unincorporated community
- Location within the state of Kentucky Rome (the United States)
- Coordinates: 37°43′16″N 87°10′51″W
- Country: United States
- State: Kentucky
- County: Daviess
- Elevation: 404 ft (123 m)
- Time zone: UTC-6 (Central (CST))
  - Summer (DST): UTC-5 (CST)
- GNIS feature ID: 502304

Rome is an unincorporated community in Daviess County, Kentucky, United States. It was also known as Clearys Grocery. Rome is also referred to as a subdivision located on Highway 81 just southwest of Owensboro.

Athey's Chapel Cemetery (also known as Rome Cemetery) is located here.
