= Habit, Kentucky =

Unincorporated community in Kentucky, United States

Habit
- Unincorporated community
- Location within the state of Kentucky Habit (the United States)
- Coordinates: 37°41′52″N 86°59′47″W
- Country: United States
- State: Kentucky
- County: Daviess
- Elevation: 554 ft (169 m)
- Time zone: UTC-6 (Central (CST))
  - Summer (DST): UTC-5 (CST)
- GNIS feature ID: 493513

Habit is an unincorporated community located in Daviess County, Kentucky, United States.

A post office was established in the community in 1884, and named for the local English-American blacksmith Frederick Habitt. Portions of the Ann Patchett novel The Patron Saint of Liars take place in the town.
