= Daviess County, Kentucky =

County in Kentucky, United States

- County
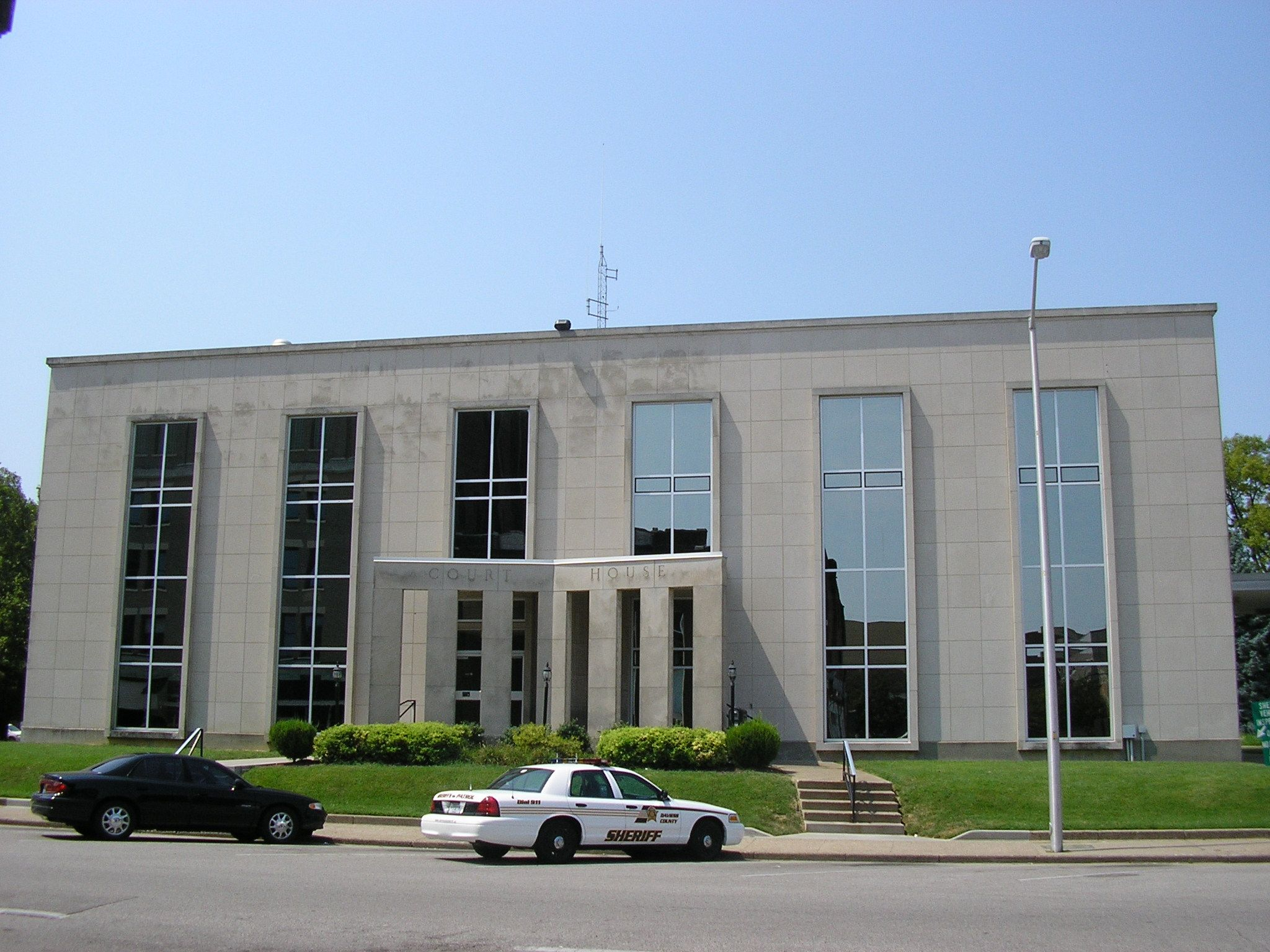
- Daviess County courthouse in Owensboro

- Flag Seal

- Location within the U.S. state of Kentucky
- Coordinates: 37°44′N 87°05′W
- Country: United States
- State: Kentucky
- Founded: January 14, 1815
- Named for: Joseph Hamilton Daveiss
- Seat: Owensboro
- Largest city: Owensboro

Government
  - Judge/Executive: Charlie Castlen (R)

Area
  - Total: 477 sq mi (1,240 km^{2})
  - Land: 458 sq mi (1,190 km^{2})
  - Water: 18 sq mi (47 km^{2}) 3.8%

Population (2020)
  - Total: 103,312
  - Estimate (2025): 104,898 ▲
  - Density: 226/sq mi (87.1/km^{2})
- Time zone: UTC−6 (Central)
  - Summer (DST): UTC−5 (CDT)
- Congressional district: 2nd
- Website: daviessky.org

Daviess County (/ˈdeɪvɪs/ "Davis"), is a county in Kentucky. As of the 2020 census, the population was 103,312. Its county seat is Owensboro. The county was formed from part of Ohio County on January 14, 1815.

Daviess County is included in the Owensboro, KY Metropolitan Statistical Area. Daviess County also shares its namesake with another nearby Daviess County of Indiana. Both counties are in the Illinois-Indiana-Kentucky Tri-State Area.

== History ==
Daviess County was established in 1815. The county is named for Major Joseph Hamilton Daveiss (a recording error in the State Clerk's office accounts for the error in spelling, which was never corrected), the United States Attorney who unsuccessfully prosecuted Aaron Burr. The county's borders were altered in 1829 to form Hancock County, in 1830 to absorb a small area surrounding Whitesville, in 1854 to cede land to McLean County, and finally in 1860 to annex 44 square miles (110 km^{2}) from Henderson County.

The courthouse was burned in January 1865 during the American Civil War, but the county records were spared destruction because they had been transferred to a church.

== Geography ==
According to the United States Census Bureau, the county has a total area of 477 square miles (1,240 km^{2}), of which 458 square miles (1,190 km^{2}) is land and 18 square miles (47 km^{2}) (3.8%) is water. The northern half of the county along the Ohio River is relatively flat, with a few rolling hills dotting the landscape. The southern portion is mostly rolling hills mixed with flat valleys. The southern portion was mined for coal in the past, especially in the rolling hills along Panther Creek and other streams.

=== Adjacent counties ===
- Warrick County, Indiana (northwest)
- Spencer County, Indiana (northeast)
- Hancock County (east)
- Ohio County (southeast)
- McLean County (southwest)
- Henderson County (west)

== Demographics ==
Historical population
Census	Pop.	Note	%±
1820	3,876		—
1830	5,209		34.4%
1840	8,331		59.9%
1850	12,362		48.4%
1860	15,549		25.8%
1870	20,714		33.2%
1880	27,730		33.9%
1890	33,120		19.4%
1900	38,667		16.7%
1910	41,020		6.1%
1920	40,733		−0.7%
1930	43,779		7.5%
1940	52,335		19.5%
1950	57,241		9.4%
1960	70,588		23.3%
1970	79,486		12.6%
1980	85,949		8.1%
1990	87,189		1.4%
2000	91,545		5.0%
2010	96,656		5.6%
2020	103,312		6.9%
2025 (est.)	104,898	▲	1.5%
U.S. Decennial Census; 1790–1960 1900–1990; 1990–2000 2010–2020

=== 2020 census ===
As of the 2020 census, the county had a population of 103,312. The median age was 39.0 years. 24.0% of residents were under the age of 18 and 17.6% of residents were 65 years of age or older. For every 100 females there were 95.8 males, and for every 100 females age 18 and over there were 93.1 males age 18 and over.

The racial makeup of the county was 85.6% White, 4.7% Black or African American, 0.3% American Indian and Alaska Native, 2.3% Asian, 0.1% Native Hawaiian and Pacific Islander, 1.8% from some other race, and 5.2% from two or more races. Hispanic or Latino residents of any race comprised 4.0% of the population.

74.0% of residents lived in urban areas, while 26.0% lived in rural areas.

There were 41,105 households in the county, of which 30.8% had children under the age of 18 living with them and 28.0% had a female householder with no spouse or partner present. About 29.4% of all households were made up of individuals and 12.8% had someone living alone who was 65 years of age or older.

There were 43,863 housing units, of which 6.3% were vacant. Among occupied housing units, 67.0% were owner-occupied and 33.0% were renter-occupied. The homeowner vacancy rate was 1.5% and the rental vacancy rate was 6.8%.

=== 2010 census ===
As of the census of 2010, there were 96,656 people, 36,033 households, and 24,826 families residing in the county. The population density was 198 per square mile (76/km^{2}). There were 38,432 housing units at an average density of 83 per square mile (32/km^{2}). The racial makeup of the county was 93.69% White, 4.35% Black or African American, 0.13% Native American, 0.43% Asian, 0.02% Pacific Islander, 0.44% from other races, and 0.94% from two or more races. 0.92% of the population were Hispanic or Latino of any race.

There were 36,033 households, out of which 32.90% had children under the age of 18 living with them, 53.60% were married couples living together, 11.80% had a female householder with no husband present, and 31.10% were non-families. 27.10% of all households were made up of individuals, and 11.10% had someone living alone who was 65 years of age or older. The average household size was 2.47 and the average family size was 3.00.

In the county, the population was spread out, with 25.80% under the age of 18, 9.00% from 18 to 24, 28.40% from 25 to 44, 23.00% from 45 to 64, and 13.80% who were 65 years of age or older. The median age was 37 years. For every 100 females, there were 92.60 males. For every 100 females age 18 and over, there were 88.30 males.

The median income for a household in the county was $36,813, and the median income for a family was $45,404. Males had a median income of $35,295 versus $21,971 for females. The per capita income for the county was $18,739. About 9.40% of families and 12.30% of the population were below the poverty line, including 15.60% of those under age 18 and 11.40% of those age 65 or over.

== Economy ==
=== Distilling ===
Daviess County has long had a reputation as the leading center of the production of distilled spirits, chiefly Kentucky bourbon. Walter McFarland, who moved here from North Carolina, began making whiskey and peach brandy in about 1804 on a 200-acre (0.81 km^{2}) estate just south of Panther Creek, on today's U.S. 431. Cornelius Westerfield also began distilling corn whiskey in the early 1800s on his farm three miles (4.8 km) southwest of Whitesville, Kentucky, on Deserter Creek. It finally closed in 1872, after more than 60 years of production.

By the 1880s, 18 large distilleries operated in Daviess County at the same time. Today only three remain. One dates back to 1869, the former Glenmore Distillery Company, which was originally the R. Monarch Distillery. In 1885, J.W. McCullough began the Green River Distillery which ran until Prohibition and was subsequently purchased thereafter by Charles Medley Distillers where it ran until the 1950s, changing ownership a number of times without producing anything until its eventual purchase by Trinidad-based Angostura Limited, who bought the Medley Distillery in 2007 with plans to make its entrance into the world's bourbon market, but the severe global recession in 2008 ended those plans. The distillery was sold to the Terressentia Corporation in 2014. In 2020, the distillery was renamed as Green River Distilling Co, restoring the Green River name that was used at the facility under McCulloch's original ownership.

The following is list of distilleries operating in 1883

- Owensboro Distilling Company, founded 1880
- Sour-Mash Distilling Company, founded 1868
- Hill, Perkins and Company, founded 1880
- Rock Spring Distillery, founded 1881
- Hill and Perkins Distillery, founded 1866
- R. Monarch Distillery, founded 1869, acquired and renamed in 1901 Glenmore Distillery Company
- E.P. Millet and Company, founded 1880
- John Thixton Distillery Company
- John Hanning Distillery Company, founded 1869
- Eagle Distillery Company, founded 1869
- Daviess county Distilling Company, founded April 16, 1874
- M.P. Mattingly's Distyillery, founded 1855
- Daviess County Club Distillery, founded 1880
- J.W.M. Field Distillery, founded February 3, 1873
- J.T. Welch Distilling Company, founded March 1, 1881
- Boulware and Wilhoute's Distillery, founded 1880
- C.L. Appelgate and Company distillery, founded 1879 at Yelvington, Kentucky

=== Coal mining ===
The southwestern portion of the county around the Panther Creek area was heavily mined through the 1960s till the early 1990s. After 1998 large tracts of mined land were left unclaimed. After a lengthy search for contractors by the state government's Division of Abandoned Mine Lands, work commenced on the largest tract, a 42-acre (170,000 m^{2}) tract once part of the now defunct Green Coal Company. The 42 acres (170,000 m^{2}) of unclaimed land were part of Green Coal Company's mine once known as the "Panther Surface Mine". Green Coal Company was a staple mining company in Daviess County and was based nearby in Henderson.

Reclamation work commenced at the site on November 8, 1999, and was completed on April 14, 2000. The licensed blaster employed by the contractor blasted the highwall into the pit, resulting in a reduced effort to grade and dress the final slope. Enough topsoil was gained from the area above the highwall to allow a growing medium for re-vegetation purposes. This site has been returned to a stable property. All 42 acres (170,000 m^{2}) of this project was reclaimed expending $127,538.82 of the available bond. The land is now safe for the public and is usable agricultural land once again.

== Politics ==
United States presidential election results for Daviess County, Kentucky
Year	Republican		Democratic		Third party(ies)	
Year	No.	%	No.	%	No.	%
1880	1,271	27.85%	3,054	66.91%	239	5.24%
1884	1,571	32.91%	3,139	65.77%	63	1.32%
1888	2,238	36.60%	3,818	62.44%	59	0.96%
1892	1,638	24.29%	3,431	50.87%	1,675	24.84%
1896	3,105	37.28%	4,952	59.46%	271	3.25%
1900	3,738	42.14%	4,910	55.36%	222	2.50%
1904	3,381	40.33%	4,754	56.71%	248	2.96%
1908	3,922	42.06%	5,218	55.96%	184	1.97%
1912	1,506	19.45%	4,314	55.72%	1,922	24.83%
1916	4,078	42.60%	5,396	56.37%	99	1.03%
1920	7,584	43.69%	9,669	55.70%	106	0.61%
1924	7,270	46.67%	8,116	52.10%	192	1.23%
1928	8,896	54.77%	7,332	45.14%	15	0.09%
1932	5,059	32.25%	10,527	67.12%	99	0.63%
1936	4,636	30.21%	9,957	64.88%	754	4.91%
1940	5,633	37.49%	9,344	62.19%	49	0.33%
1944	6,135	42.74%	8,143	56.73%	77	0.54%
1948	4,873	35.06%	8,682	62.46%	344	2.47%
1952	10,462	58.09%	7,522	41.77%	26	0.14%
1956	11,491	62.54%	6,674	36.33%	208	1.13%
1960	13,385	57.62%	9,846	42.38%	0	0.00%
1964	8,350	35.15%	15,253	64.21%	152	0.64%
1968	10,111	40.22%	9,947	39.56%	5,084	20.22%
1972	17,234	65.64%	8,168	31.11%	854	3.25%
1976	12,826	46.72%	14,114	51.41%	514	1.87%
1980	14,643	47.67%	14,902	48.51%	1,172	3.82%
1984	19,495	58.92%	13,347	40.34%	244	0.74%
1988	17,356	53.49%	14,815	45.66%	274	0.84%
1992	14,936	40.45%	16,592	44.93%	5,401	14.63%
1996	15,844	45.36%	15,366	43.99%	3,720	10.65%
2000	21,361	58.94%	14,126	38.98%	753	2.08%
2004	25,372	61.16%	15,788	38.06%	323	0.78%
2008	23,692	54.31%	19,282	44.20%	648	1.49%
2012	25,092	59.62%	16,208	38.51%	787	1.87%
2016	28,907	63.11%	14,163	30.92%	2,737	5.98%
2020	31,025	62.95%	17,286	35.07%	976	1.98%
2024	30,705	65.20%	15,673	33.28%	719	1.53%

=== Elected officials ===
Elected officials as of January 3, 2025
U.S. House	Brett Guthrie (R)	KY 2
Ky. Senate	Gary Boswell (R)	8
Ky. House	Suzanne Miles (R)	7
Ky. House	DJ Johnson (R)	13
Ky. House	Scott Lewis (R)	14

== Communities ==
=== Cities ===
- Owensboro (county seat)
- Whitesville

=== Census-designated places ===
- Curdsville
- Knottsville
- Maceo
- Masonville
- Moseleyville
- Panther
- Philpot
- Pleasant Ridge (partially in Ohio County)
- St. Joseph
- Sorgho
- Stanley
- Thruston
- Utica
- West Louisville
- Yelvington

=== Other unincorporated communities ===
- Andersonville
- Birk City
- Boston
- Browns Valley
- Delaware
- Dermont
- Doyle
- Ensor
- Gatewood
- Griffith
- Habit
- Handyville
- Livia (partially in McLean County)
- Maxwell
- Newman
- Oak Ridge
- Oklahoma
- Pettit
- Red Hill
- Rome
- Scythia
- Spice Knob
- Sutherland
- Tuck

== See also ==
- Daviess County Public Schools
- Owensboro Public Schools
- National Register of Historic Places listings in Daviess County, Kentucky
