= Caesar, Mississippi =

- Unincorporated community
- Location within Mississippi Location within the United States
- Coordinates: 30°35′3″N 89°32′48″W
- Country: United States
- State: Mississippi
- County: Pearl River
- Elevation: 164 ft (50 m)
- Time zone: UTC-6 (Central (CST))
  - Summer (DST): UTC-5 (CDT)
- Area codes: 601 & 769
- GNIS feature ID: 667903

Caesar is an unincorporated community in Pearl River County, Mississippi, United States.

== History ==
Caesar is reportedly named for a local Choctaw chief.

The community is located between Catahoula Creek and Playground Branch. The area around Caesar was originally inhabited by the Choctaw, who had one of their largest settlements in southern Mississippi one mile east at Center.

Caesar was once located on the H. Weston Lumber Company's local railroad line.

In 1906, Caesar had a church, school, and several stores. It was also home to one of the largest turpentine plants in Mississippi.

A post office operated under the name Caesar from 1900 to 1922.
