= Stanley, Kentucky =

Unincorporated community in Kentucky, United States

Stanley
- Unincorporated community
- Location within the state of Kentucky Stanley (the United States)
- Coordinates: 37°49′24″N 87°14′38″W
- Country: United States
- State: Kentucky
- County: Daviess

Area
  - Total: 0.84 sq mi (2.17 km^{2})
  - Land: 0.84 sq mi (2.17 km^{2})
  - Water: 0.0039 sq mi (0.01 km^{2})
- Elevation: 387 ft (118 m)

Population (2020)
  - Total: 309
  - Density: 369.5/sq mi (142.66/km^{2})
- Time zone: UTC-6 (Central (CST))
  - Summer (DST): UTC-5 (CST)
- ZIP codes: 42375
- FIPS code: 21-73146
- GNIS feature ID: 504258

Stanley is an unincorporated community in Daviess County, Kentucky, United States. As of the 2020 census, Stanley had a population of 309. Its zip code was 42375, but its post office closed in 1997.

== Demographics ==
Historical population
Census	Pop.	Note	%±
2020	309		—
U.S. Decennial Census

== Climate ==
The climate in this area is characterized by hot, humid summers and generally mild to cool winters. According to the Köppen Climate Classification system, Stanley has a humid subtropical climate, abbreviated "Cfa" on climate maps.
