= Sorgho, Kentucky =

Unincorporated community in Kentucky, United States

- Unincorporated community
- Location within Kentucky
- Coordinates: 37°45′11″N 87°14′50″W
- Country: United States
- State: Kentucky
- County: Daviess

Area
  - Total: 4.75 sq mi (12.30 km^{2})
  - Land: 4.74 sq mi (12.28 km^{2})
  - Water: 0.0077 sq mi (0.02 km^{2})
- Elevation: 384 ft (117 m)

Population (2020)
  - Total: 1,972
  - Density: 415.8/sq mi (160.55/km^{2})
- Time zone: UTC-6 (Central (CST))
  - Summer (DST): UTC-5 (CDT)
- ZIP code: 42334
- Area code: 270
- GNIS feature ID: 497423

Sorgho, Kentucky, originally named and known as Sorghotown, the boundaries of this unincorporated community were described in an order dated 12 May 1874, by Daviess County, Kentucky Judge Triplett, worded as follows: " Upon the application of ten voters to be effected by the change hereinafter specified; and it appearing to the Court right and proper that said change should be made; and further that the requirements of the law as to notice before application has been complied with, – it is therefore ordered that an additional voting precinct be and the same is hereby established in Daviess County (Kentucky), in District No. 1, to be called and known as 'Sorghotown Voting Place'...." The community was named for the Daviess County Sorgho Sugar Company which was formed there in 1868–'69 by Dr. J. Q. A. Stewart, J. Balee and E. Guthrie. that organized there in the winter of 1868–69 for the manufacturing of sorghum sugar. Once the factory was established the community began to develop. As of the 2020 census, Sorgho had a population of 1,972.

The community was originally known as Dog Trot.

== Demographics ==
Historical population
Census	Pop.	Note	%±
2020	1,972		—
U.S. Decennial Census

=== 2020 census ===
As of the 2020 census, Sorgho had a population of 1,972. The median age was 39.2 years. 28.7% of residents were under the age of 18 and 13.7% of residents were 65 years of age or older. For every 100 females there were 99.8 males, and for every 100 females age 18 and over there were 90.7 males age 18 and over.

90.0% of residents lived in urban areas, while 10.0% lived in rural areas.

There were 696 households in Sorgho, of which 36.1% had children under the age of 18 living in them. Of all households, 70.3% were married-couple households, 11.2% were households with a male householder and no spouse or partner present, and 13.9% were households with a female householder and no spouse or partner present. About 15.9% of all households were made up of individuals and 7.1% had someone living alone who was 65 years of age or older.

There were 729 housing units, of which 4.5% were vacant. The homeowner vacancy rate was 1.1% and the rental vacancy rate was 3.8%.

Racial composition as of the 2020 census
Race	Number	Percent
White	1,856	94.1%
Black or African American	39	2.0%
American Indian and Alaska Native	5	0.3%
Asian	16	0.8%
Native Hawaiian and Other Pacific Islander	0	0.0%
Some other race	4	0.2%
Two or more races	52	2.6%
Hispanic or Latino (of any race)	12	0.6%
