= Daviess County High School =

Coordinates: 37°43′48.38″N 87°5′6.61″W

Location
- 4255 New Hartford Road; Owensboro, Kentucky 42303; United States

Information
- Type: Public
- School district: Daviess County Public Schools
- Staff: 90.00 (on an FTE basis)
- Grades: 9-12
- Enrollment: 1,694 (2022–2023)
- Student to teacher ratio: 18.82
- Campus type: Public
- Colours: Primary; Scarlet red White; Secondary; Black
- Nickname: Panthers
- Website: https://www.daviesskyschools.org/o/dchs

Daviess County High School is located in Owensboro, Kentucky, United States. It is one of the largest schools in the area, with roughly 1,750 students. It is part of the Daviess County Public Schools system. Its sister school is Apollo High School. Daviess County Middle School and College View Middle School feed into Daviess County High School.

== Notable alumni ==
- Joseph R. Bowen, Kentucky state legislator
- Wayne Chapman, former professional American Basketball Association player
- Donald Douglas, physician and member of the Kentucky Senate
- Wendell Ford, former governor of Kentucky and U.S. senator
- Tyrone Hopson, former NFL lineman for San Francisco 49ers and Detroit Lions
- Jeremy Mayfield, former NASCAR driver
- Madison Silvert, president of Brescia University
- Larry Vanover, Major League Baseball umpire
- Darrell Waltrip, three time NASCAR Cup (then Winston Cup) champion
