= Yelvington, Kentucky =

Unincorporated community in Kentucky, United States

Yelvington
- Unincorporated community
- Location within Kentucky
- Coordinates: 37°51′20″N 86°58′2″W
- Country: United States
- State: Kentucky
- County: Daviess

Area
  - Total: 0.93 sq mi (2.40 km^{2})
  - Land: 0.76 sq mi (1.96 km^{2})
  - Water: 0.17 sq mi (0.44 km^{2})
- Elevation: 390 ft (120 m)

Population (2020)
  - Total: 437
  - Density: 576.8/sq mi (222.71/km^{2})
- Time zone: UTC-6 (Central (CST))
  - Summer (DST): UTC-5 (CDT)
- ZIP code: 42355
- Area code: 270
- GNIS feature ID: 497423

Yelvington is a small unincorporated community in the U.S. state of Kentucky, located approximately 12 miles east of Owensboro along U.S. Route 60 east and near the Daviess-Hancock county line. As of the 2020 census, Yelvington had a population of 437.

== Demographics ==
Historical population
Census	Pop.	Note	%±
2020	437		—
U.S. Decennial Census

== History ==
The original boundaries of Yelvington were set by the Daviess County Court in 1867.

Yelvington was settled in the early 19th century when it was in the northern portion of Ohio County, KY, by Valentine Husk and James Smeathers, brother of famed pioneer William Smeathers who first settled Yellow Banks, Kentucky; now Owensboro. It was also an early crossroad for the Vincennes, Indiana to Hartford, Kentucky Indian trail and the Yellow Banks trail. This route gave what was to become Daviess county's third primitive overland route of travel.

Yelvington was a prosperous community with a funeral home, hotel, various stores and other forms of commerce including a distillery owned by C.L. Appelgate and Company which was built between 1879 and 1880 on the west side of the community as well as another whiskey distillery owned by a lawyer, Camden Riley Jr. A raging fire burned through the community in the late 19th century which destroyed most of the business. Most of the business rebuilt a few miles to the east along the railroad at the Powers Station, today known as Maceo, Kentucky situated along U.S. Route 60 about 10 miles east of Owensboro, Kentucky.

Yelvington was also home of United States Senator Thomas C. McCreery who was born there December 12, 1816. He was elected to fill a vacancy created by the resignation of Senator James Guthrie of Louisville in 1868 and remained in office until March 3, 1879, when he returned to Daviess County to live in Owensboro, KY. McCreery died July 10, 1890.

Yelvington is home to the Yelvington Baptist Church organized on June 30, 1813, about two miles west of its present location. When organized the church adopted its original name as "Panther Creek Church of Ohio County, near Yellow Banks, Kentucky." This name was adopted because what is now known as Yelvington was in Ohio County at that time. In 1817 the name was changed to "Rock Spring", and in 1854 the name was changed to "Yelvington Baptist Church" and as remained so ever since. It is the oldest Baptist church in Daviess County, KY.
