= DJ Johnson (politician) =

American politician (born 1957)

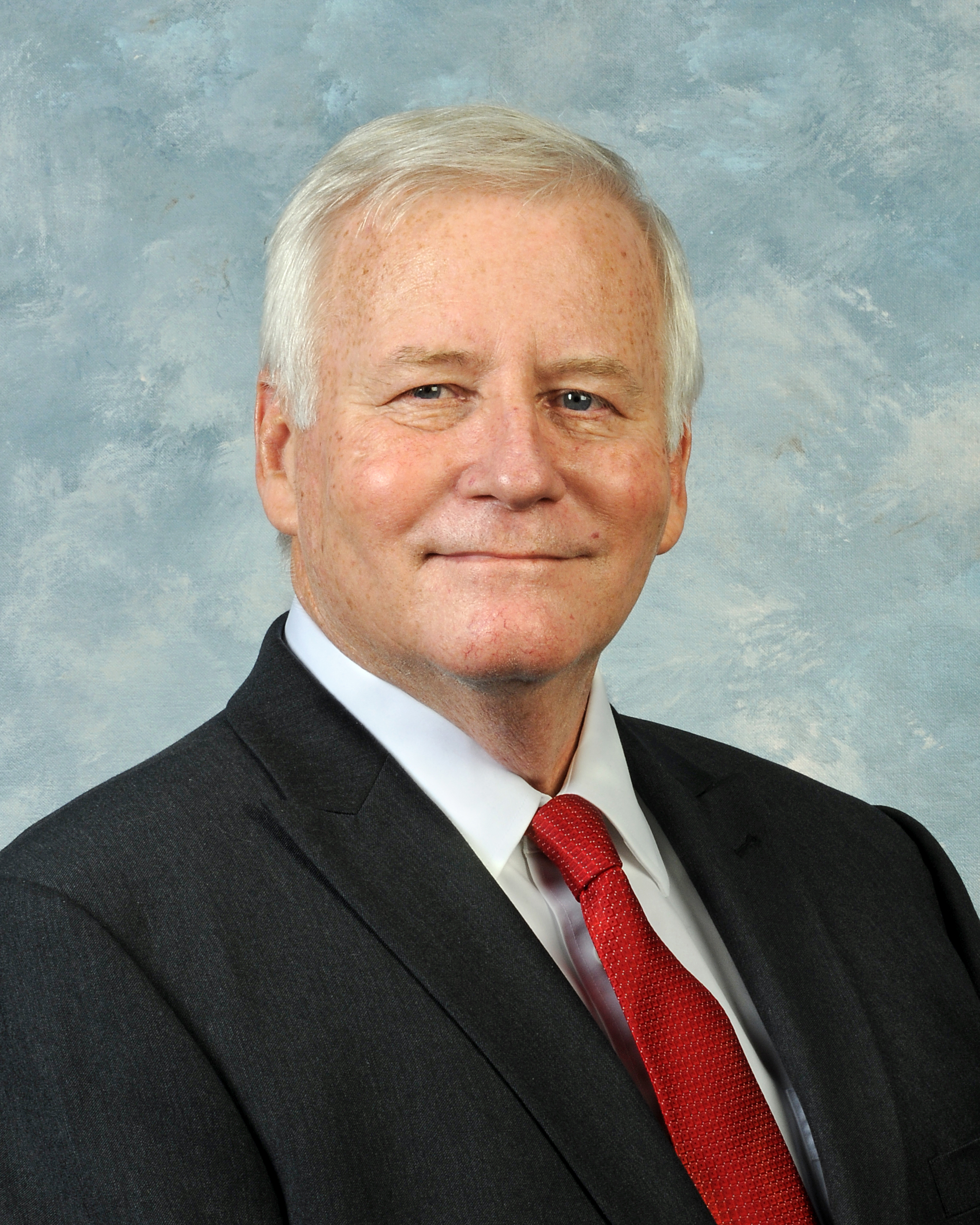
- Official portrait, 2020

Member of the Kentucky House of Representatives from the 13th district
- Incumbent
- Assumed office January 1, 2021
- Preceded by: Jim Glenn
- In office January 1, 2017 – January 1, 2019
- Preceded by: Jim Glenn
- Succeeded by: Jim Glenn

Personal details
- Born: November 2, 1957 (age 68) Owensboro, Kentucky
- Party: Republican
- Education: Western Kentucky University (BA)
- Committees: Elections, Constitutional Amendments, and Government Affairs (Chair); Natural Resources and Energy; State Government; Veterans, Military Affairs, and Public Protection

Military service
- Allegiance: United States
- Branch/service: United States Army
- Years of service: 1979-1990
- Rank: Captain

Stanley D. "DJ" Johnson (born November 2, 1957) is an American politician who has served as a Republican member of the Kentucky House of Representatives since January 2021. He represents Kentucky's 13th House district, which includes part of Daviess County.

Johnson had previously represented the district from 2017 to 2019, but was defeated for re-election by Jim Glenn (whom he had defeated in 2016) by a margin of one vote. In 2020, Johnson defeated Glenn to reclaim his seat in the House.

== Background ==
Johnson was born in Owensboro, Kentucky, and graduated from Apollo High School. He then attended Western Kentucky University, graduating in 1979 with a Bachelor of Arts in communications and military science. He was commissioned as a field artillery second lieutenant that same year and served until 1990 when he completed his military career with the rank of captain. During his time in the military, Johnson earned the master parachutist badge and was inducted into the Order of Saint Barbara, a military honor society.

In addition to responsibilities as a state legislator, Johnson is also an educator at Grace Christian Academy.

== Political career ==
=== Elections ===
- 2016 Johnson was unopposed in the 2016 Republican primary and won the 2016 Kentucky House of Representatives election against Democratic incumbent Jim Glenn, winning with 8,343 votes.
- 2018 Johnson was unopposed in the 2018 Republican primary and was defeated in the 2018 Kentucky House of Representatives election by Democratic candidate Jim Glenn, losing by a margin of 1 vote.
- 2020 Johnson was unopposed in the 2020 Republican primary and won the 2020 Kentucky House of Representatives election against incumbent Jim Glenn, winning with 9,485 votes.
- 2022 Johnson was unopposed in the 2022 Republican primary and won the 2022 Kentucky House of Representatives election against Democratic candidate Michael Johnson, winning with 8,387 votes.
- 2024 Johnson was unopposed in both the 2024 Republican primary and the 2024 Kentucky House of Representatives election, winning the latter with 13,913.
