= Madison Silvert =

American academic administrator

6th President of Brescia University
- Incumbent
- Assumed office March 31, 2025
- Preceded by: Larry Hostetter

Personal details
- Born: April 29, 1976 (age 49); Daviess County, Kentucky, U.S.
- Spouse: Amy Strehl (m. 2000)
- Education: Centre College (B.A.); University of Louisville School of Law (J.D.)

Madison Crawford Silvert (born April 29, 1976) is an American lawyer and administrator who has been the sixth president of Brescia University since 2025. He is Brescia's first lay president.

== Early life and education ==
Madison Crawford Silvert was born in Daviess County, Kentucky, on April 29, 1976, to Mary (née Thacker) and David Silvert. He attended Daviess County High School and graduated in 1994. He earned a Bachelor of Arts in economics from Centre College in 1998 and a Juris Doctor from the University of Louisville School of Law in 2001.

== Career ==
Silvert began his career as a practicing lawyer for six years in Louisville and Owensboro, Kentucky. In 2007, he accepted a position at the Greater Owensboro Economic Development Corporation as vice president of entrepreneurship and high tech development; six years later he was elevated to president and CEO. He was named president of the Malcolm Bryant Corporation, a real estate development company, in 2017. (Note: The Malcolm Bryant Corporation changed its name to BryantCorp during Silvert's presidency.)

Silvert was announced as the incoming president of Brescia University, in Owensboro, Kentucky, on December 17, 2024. He took office as Brescia's sixth president on March 31, 2025, succeeding Larry Hostetter. He is the school's first lay president—his prior professional experiences led WFIE to characterize his appointment as "unusual" for Brescia.

== Personal life ==
Silvert married Amy Strehl on August 5, 2000. They have three children.
