= Kentucky's 13th House of Representatives district =

American legislative district

Kentucky's 13th State House of Representatives district
Representative
DJ Johnson; R–Owensboro
since January 1, 2021
- Registration: 44.8% Democratic; 44.7% Republican; 9.8% No party preference
- Demographics: 84.3% White; 4.6% Black; 5.2% Hispanic; 1.6% Asian; 0.2% Native American; 0.6% Other; 3.6% Multiracial
- Population (2023): 43,320
- Registered voters (2025): 33,398

Kentucky's 13th House of Representatives district is one of 100 districts in the Kentucky House of Representatives. Located in the western part of the state, it comprises part of Daviess County. It has been represented by DJ Johnson (R–Owensboro) since 2021. He previously represented the district from 2017 to 2019. As of 2023, the district had a population of 43,320.

== Voter registration ==
On January 1, 2025, the district had 33,398 registered voters, who were registered with the following parties.

Party	Registration	
Party	Voters	%
Democratic	14,953	44.77
Republican	14,939	44.73
Independent	1,402	4.20
Libertarian	172	0.52
Green	27	0.08
Constitution	17	0.05
Socialist Workers	6	0.02
Reform	3	0.01
"Other"	1,879	5.63
Total	33,398	100.00
Source: Kentucky State Board of Elections

== List of members representing the district ==
Member	Party	Years	Electoral history	District location
E. Louis Johnson (Owensboro)	Democratic	January 1, 1978 – January 1, 1995	Elected in 1977. Reelected in 1979. Reelected in 1981. Reelected in 1984. Reelected in 1986. Reelected in 1988. Reelected in 1990. Reelected in 1992. Retired.	1974–1985; Daviess County (part).
E. Louis Johnson (Owensboro)	Democratic	January 1, 1978 – January 1, 1995	Elected in 1977. Reelected in 1979. Reelected in 1981. Reelected in 1984. Reelected in 1986. Reelected in 1988. Reelected in 1990. Reelected in 1992. Retired.	1985–1993; Daviess County (part).
E. Louis Johnson (Owensboro)	Democratic	January 1, 1978 – January 1, 1995	Elected in 1977. Reelected in 1979. Reelected in 1981. Reelected in 1984. Reelected in 1986. Reelected in 1988. Reelected in 1990. Reelected in 1992. Retired.	1993–1997; Daviess County (part).
Brian Crall (Owensboro)	Republican	January 1, 1995 – April 16, 2004	Elected in 1994. Reelected in 1996. Reelected in 1998. Reelected in 2000. Reelected in 2002. Resigned.	1993–1997; Daviess County (part).
Brian Crall (Owensboro)	Republican	January 1, 1995 – April 16, 2004	Elected in 1994. Reelected in 1996. Reelected in 1998. Reelected in 2000. Reelected in 2002. Resigned.	1997–2003
Brian Crall (Owensboro)	Republican	January 1, 1995 – April 16, 2004	Elected in 1994. Reelected in 1996. Reelected in 1998. Reelected in 2000. Reelected in 2002. Resigned.	2003–2015
Joseph R. Bowen (Owensboro)	Republican	January 1, 2005 – January 1, 2007	Elected in 2004. Lost reelection.	2003–2015
Jim Glenn (Owensboro)	Democratic	January 1, 2007 – January 1, 2017	Elected in 2006. Reelected in 2008. Reelected in 2010. Reelected in 2012. Reelected in 2014. Lost reelection.	2003–2015
Jim Glenn (Owensboro)	Democratic	January 1, 2007 – January 1, 2017	Elected in 2006. Reelected in 2008. Reelected in 2010. Reelected in 2012. Reelected in 2014. Lost reelection.	2015–2023
DJ Johnson (Owensboro)	Republican	January 1, 2017 – January 1, 2019	Elected in 2016. Lost reelection.	2015–2023
Jim Glenn (Owensboro)	Democratic	January 1, 2019 – January 1, 2021	Elected in 2018. Lost reelection.	2015–2023
DJ Johnson (Owensboro)	Republican	January 1, 2021 – present	Elected in 2020. Reelected in 2022. Reelected in 2024. Reelected in 2026.	2015–2023
DJ Johnson (Owensboro)	Republican	January 1, 2021 – present	Elected in 2020. Reelected in 2022. Reelected in 2024. Reelected in 2026.	2023–present
