= Wayne Chapman (basketball) =

American basketball player and coach

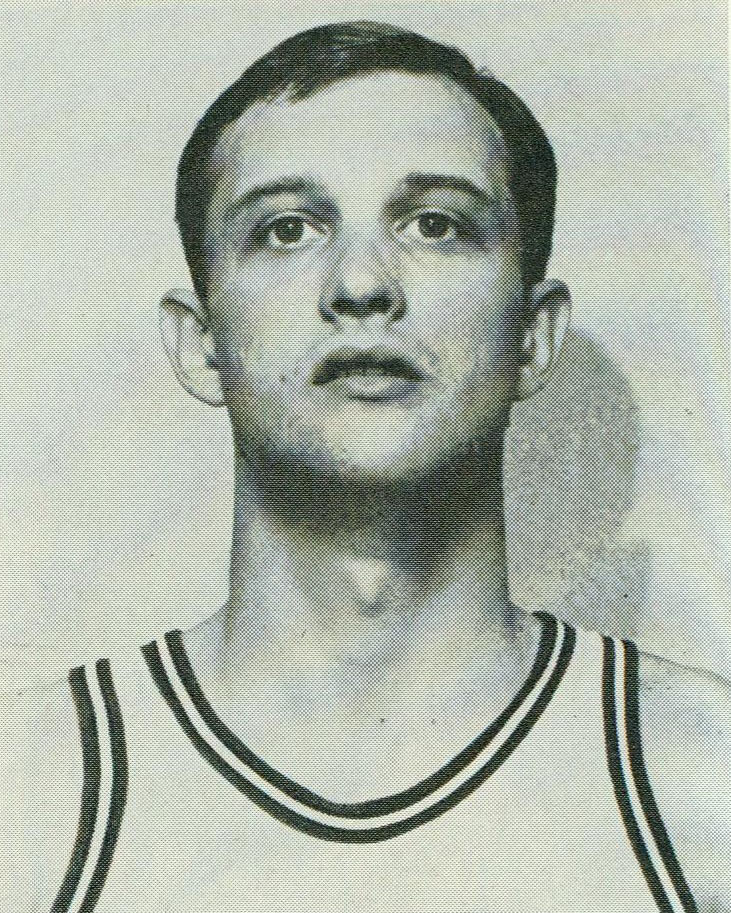

Personal information
- Born: June 15, 1945 (age 81) Owensboro, Kentucky, U.S.
- Listed height: 6 ft 6 in (1.98 m)
- Listed weight: 190 lb (86 kg)

Career information
- High school: Daviess County (Owensboro, Kentucky)
- College: Western Kentucky (1965–1968)
- NBA draft: 1968: 9th round, 110th overall pick
- Drafted by: Baltimore Bullets
- Playing career: 1968–1972
- Position: Shooting guard / small forward
- Number: 10, 22, 40, 32

Career history

Playing
- 1968–1970: Kentucky Colonels
- 1970–1971: Denver Rockets
- 1971–1972: Indiana Pacers

Coaching
- 1972–1973: Daviess County HS (assistant)
- 1973–1978: Apollo HS
- 1978–1980: Hancock County HS
- 1980–1985: Kentucky Wesleyan (assistant)
- 1985–1990: Kentucky Wesleyan

Career highlights
- As player: OVC Player of the Year (1968); 2× First-team All-OVC (1967, 1968); As coach: 2× NCAA Division II champion (1987, 1990)

Career ABA statistics
- Points: 1,432 (6.9 ppg)
- Rebounds: 505 (2.5 rpg)
- Assists: 316 (1.5 apg)
- Stats at Basketball Reference

Wayne G. Chapman (born June 15, 1945) is an American former professional basketball player and coach. He played four seasons in the American Basketball Association (ABA) and won two college national titles as the head coach for the Kentucky Wesleyan Panthers.

Born in Owensboro, Kentucky, Chapman graduated from Daviess County High School and played collegiately for Western Kentucky University.

He was selected by the Philadelphia 76ers in the 16th round (156th pick overall) of the 1967 NBA draft, by the Baltimore Bullets in the ninth round (110th pick overall) of the 1968 NBA draft and by the Kentucky Colonels in the 1968 ABA draft.

He played for the Kentucky Colonels (1968–70), Denver Rockets (1970–71) and Indiana Pacers (1970–71 and 1971–72) in the ABA for 206 games.

He coached Apollo High School basketball in the late 1970s and was the head coach at Kentucky Wesleyan College from 1985 to 1990, winning two NCAA Division II National Championships.

He is the father of former NBA player Rex Chapman.

== Head coaching record ==
Record table
Season	Team	Overall	Conference	Standing	Postseason
Kentucky Wesleyan Panthers (Great Lakes Valley Conference) (1985–1990)
1985–86	Kentucky Wesleyan	22–8	12–4	2nd	NCAA Div II First Round
1986–87	Kentucky Wesleyan	28–5	13–3	1st	NCAA Div II Champion
1987–88	Kentucky Wesleyan	23–7	12–4	T–1st	NCAA Div II Sweet 16
1988–89	Kentucky Wesleyan	24–7	13–3	1st	NCAA Div II Elite Eight
1989–90	Kentucky Wesleyan	31–2	16–2	1st	NCAA Div II Champion
Kentucky Wesleyan:		128–29	66–16		
Total:		128–29			
National champion Postseason invitational champion Conference regular season champion Conference regular season and conference tournament champion Division regular season champion Division regular season and conference tournament champion Conference tournament champion
