= Joseph R. Bowen =

American politician (1950–2022)

Member of the Kentucky Senate from the 8th district
- In office January 1, 2011 – January 1, 2019
- Preceded by: David Boswell
- Succeeded by: Matt Castlen

Member of the Kentucky House of Representatives from the 13th district
- In office January 1, 2005 – January 1, 2007
- Preceded by: Brian Crall
- Succeeded by: Jim Glenn

Personal details
- Born: April 22, 1950 Evansville, Indiana, U.S.
- Died: March 8, 2022 (aged 71) Lexington, Kentucky, U.S.
- Party: Republican
- Spouse: Vicki

Joseph R. Bowen (April 22, 1950 – March 8, 2022) was an American politician from Kentucky.

Bowen was born in Evansville, Indiana and graduated from the Daviess County High School in Owensboro, Kentucky in 1968. He then graduated from University of Kentucky, in 1972, with a bachelor's degree in business administration. He worked for his family's business, the Bowen Tire Company, in Owensboro.

Bowen was first elected to the Kentucky House of Representatives, representing the 13th district as a Republican from 2005 until 2007. He was defeated for re-election in 2006 by Democrat Jim Glenn. He was then a member of the Kentucky Senate from the 8th District, from 2011 to 2019. He was only the third Republican to hold that Senate seat, formerly held by Wendell Ford from 1966 to 1967.

Bowen did not seek re-election in 2018, citing health issues as well as his support for term limits. He died at a hospital in Lexington, Kentucky on March 8, 2022, at the age of 71, from complications of a heart attack he had the previous week.
