= Tyrone Hopson =

American football player (born 1976)

No. 66, 69
- Position: Offensive guard

Personal information
- Born: May 28, 1976 (age 50); Hopkinsville, Kentucky, U.S.
- Listed height: 6 ft 2 in (1.88 m)
- Listed weight: 294 lb (133 kg)

Career information
- College: Eastern Kentucky
- NFL draft: 1999: 5th round, 161st overall pick

Career history
- San Francisco 49ers (1999–2000); Jacksonville Jaguars (2001)*; Detroit Lions (2001–2002, 2004-2006)
- * Offseason or practice squad member only
- Stats at Pro Football Reference

Tyrone Hopson (born May 28, 1976) is an American former professional football player who was an offensive guard in the National Football League (NFL). He graduated from Daviess County High School in Owensboro, Kentucky. He played college football for the Eastern Kentucky Colonels and was selected in the fifth round of the 1999 NFL draft by the San Francisco 49ers.
