= Thomas C. McCreery =

American politician (1816–1890)

Thomas Clay McCreery
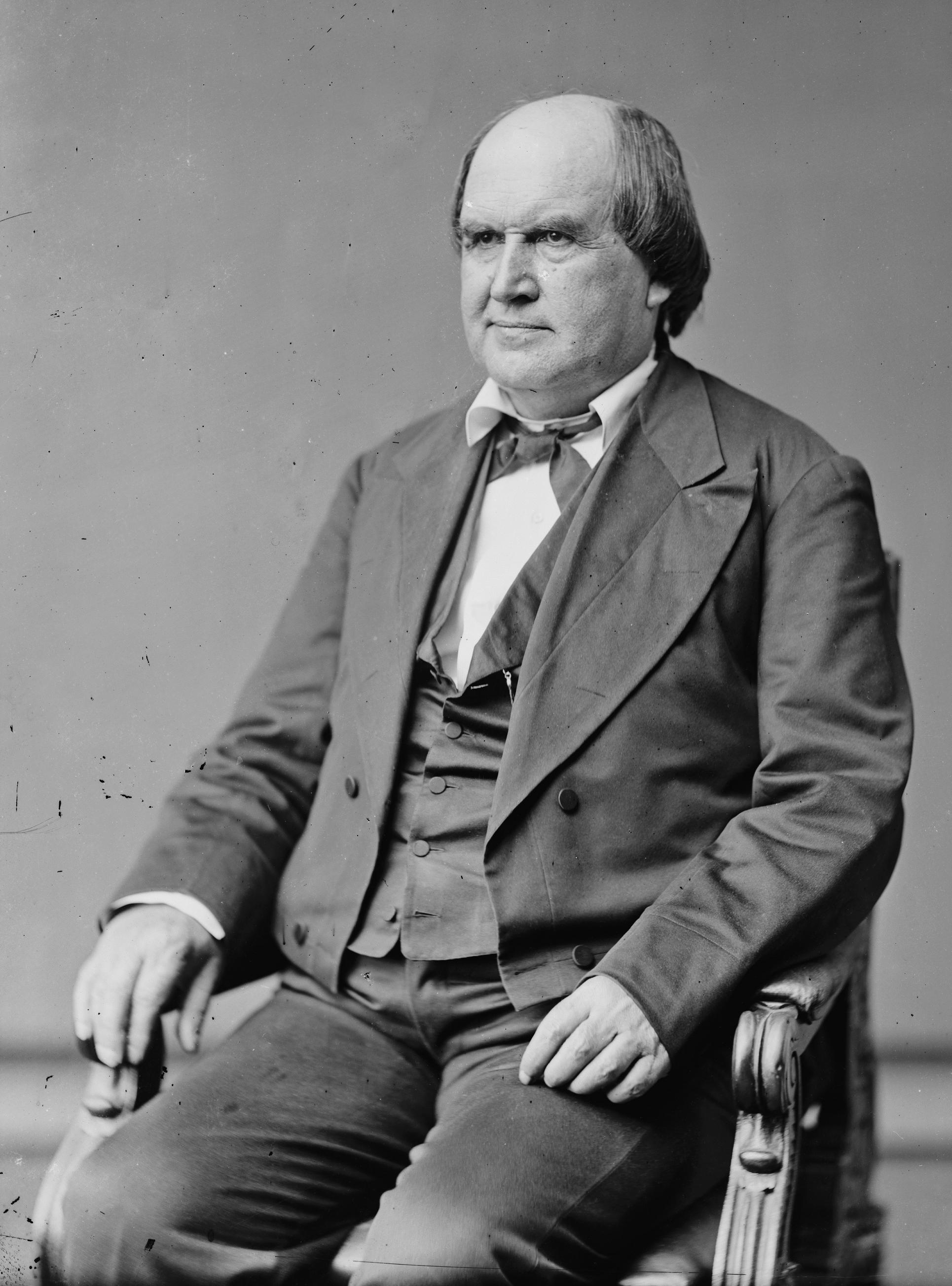

United States Senator from Kentucky
- In office February 19, 1868 – March 4, 1871
- Preceded by: James Guthrie
- Succeeded by: John W. Stevenson
- In office March 4, 1873 – March 4, 1879
- Preceded by: Willis B. Machen
- Succeeded by: John S. Williams

Personal details
- Born: December 12, 1816 Yelvington, Kentucky
- Died: July 10, 1890 (aged 73) Owensboro, Kentucky
- Party: Democratic
- Education: Centre College

Thomas Clay McCreery (December 12, 1816 – July 10, 1890) was an American politician who was a Democratic U.S. Senator from Kentucky from 1868 to 1871 and again from 1873 to 1879.

== Biography ==
Born at Yelvington, Kentucky, McCreery graduated from Centre College, in Danville, Kentucky, in 1837. He studied law, passed the bar, and commenced practice in Frankfort, Kentucky. He then returned to Owensboro and engaged in literary pursuits.

He ran unsuccessfully for election in 1842 to the Twenty-eighth Congress, and again in 1844 to the Twenty-ninth Congress. He served as a presidential elector on the Democratic tickets in 1852, 1856, and 1860. He was finally elected as a Democrat to the United States Senate to fill the vacancy caused by the resignation of James Guthrie, and served from February 19, 1868, to March 3, 1871. However, McCreery faced many accusations by then-Governor John W. Stevenson, of helping hated former Union General Steven G. Burbridge obtain a position as revenue collector, and lost to Stevenson in the following election. McCreery was again elected to the United States Senate in 1872 and served from March 4, 1873, to March 3, 1879, when he declined to be a candidate for reelection.

He retired from public life and lived on his farm in Daviess County, Kentucky, and moved back to Owensboro, where he died and was interred in Rosehill Elmwood Cemetery.

U.S. Senate
Preceded by James Guthrie	U.S. senator (Class 2) from Kentucky; 1868–1871; Served alongside: Garrett Davis	Succeeded by John W. Stevenson
Preceded by Willis B. Machen	U.S. senator (Class 3) from Kentucky; 1873–1879; Served alongside: John W. Stevenson, James B. Beck	Succeeded by John S. Williams
