= John W. Menzies =

American politician

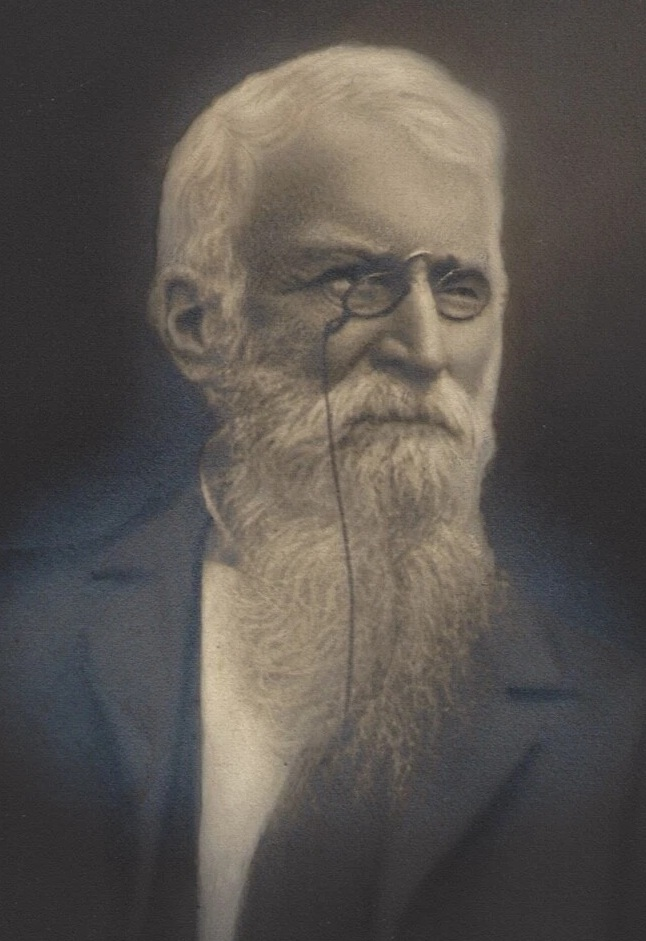
Menzies, c. 1864

John William Menzies (April 12, 1819 – October 3, 1897) was a nineteenth-century politician, lawyer and judge from Kentucky.

Born in Bryan Station, Kentucky, Menzies attended the common schools as a child and later graduated from the University of Virginia in 1840. He studied law and was admitted to the bar, commencing practice in Covington, Kentucky in 1841. He was a member of the Kentucky House of Representatives in 1848 and 1855 before being elected a Unionist to the United States House of Representatives in 1860, serving from 1861 to 1863. Afterwards, he resumed practicing law in Covington, Kentucky and was a delegate to the Democratic National Convention in 1864. Menzies served as a judge of the chancery court from 1873 to 1893 and afterwards resumed practicing law until his death in Falmouth, Kentucky on October 3, 1897. He was buried in Linden Grove Cemetery in Covington, Kentucky.

U.S. House of Representatives
Preceded by John W. Stevenson	Member of the U.S. House of Representatives from Kentucky's 10th congressional district March 4, 1861 – March 3, 1863 (obsolete district)	Succeeded by (none)
