= Brian Crall =

American politician

Member of the Kentucky House of Representatives from the 13th district
- In office January 1, 1995 – April 16, 2004
- Preceded by: E. Louis Johnson
- Succeeded by: Joseph R. Bowen

Personal details
- Party: Republican

Brian J. Crall (born September 6, 1959) is an American politician from Kentucky who was a member of the Kentucky House of Representatives from 1995 to 2004. Crall was first elected in 1994 after incumbent representative E. Louis Johnson retired. He resigned from the house in 2004. Following his tenure in the house he served as personnel secretary for governor Ernie Fletcher.
