= 1868 Kentucky gubernatorial special election =

- August 1868
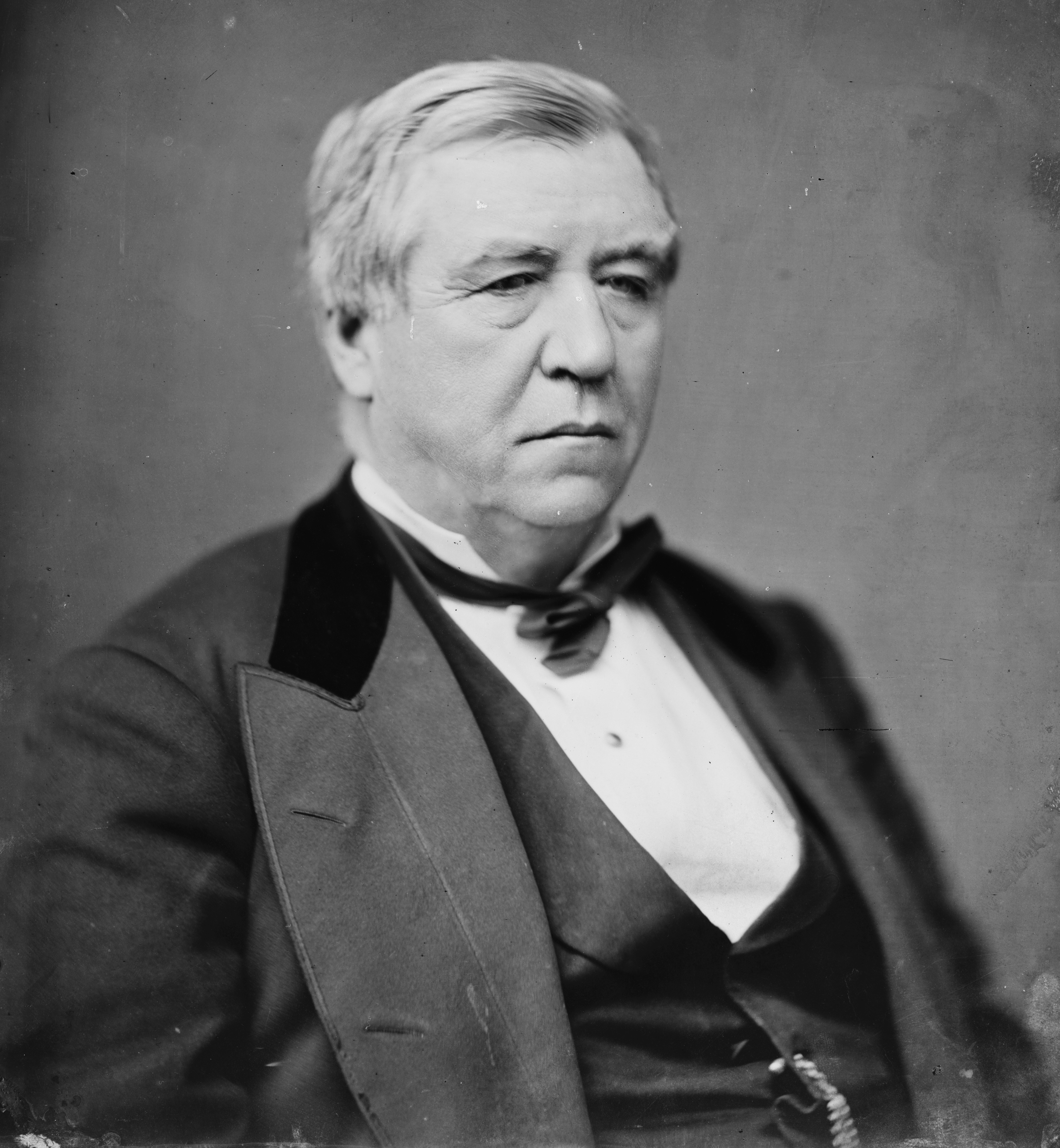

Nominee	John W. Stevenson	R. Tarvin Baker
Party	Democratic	Republican
Popular vote	114,412	25,734
Percentage	81.64%	18.36%
- County results Stevenson: 50–60% 60–70% 70–80% 80–90% >90% Baker: 50–60% 60–70% 70–80% 80–90% No returns
Governor before election
John W. Stevenson
Democratic
Elected Governor
John W. Stevenson
Democratic

The 1868 Kentucky gubernatorial special election was held in August 1868. Incumbent Democrat John W. Stevenson, who assumed office after the death of governor John L. Helm on September 8, 1867, defeated Republican nominee R. Tarvin Baker with 81.64% of the vote.

== General election ==
=== Candidates ===
- John W. Stevenson, incumbent Democratic governor
- R. Tarvin Baker, Republican

=== Results ===
1868 Kentucky gubernatorial special election
Party	Candidate	Votes	%
Democratic	John W. Stevenson (incumbent)	114,412	81.6%
Republican	R. Tarvin Baker	25,734	18.4%
Total votes		140,146	100.0
Democratic hold			
