= Yelvington Baptist Church =

Church in Yelvington, Kentucky, US

Coordinates: 37.8548°N 86.9680°W

Yelvington Baptist Church organized on June 30, 1813, about two miles west of its present location in Yelvington, Kentucky, is the oldest Southern Baptist congregation in Daviess County, Kentucky. When organized the church adopted its original name as "Panther Creek Church of Ohio County, near Yellowbanks." This name was adopted because of what is now known as Yelvington was in Ohio County at that time. In 1817 the name was changed to "Rock Spring", and in 1854 the name was changed to "Yelvington Baptist Church" and as remained so ever since. It is the oldest Baptist church in Daviess County.
