= Jim Glenn =

American politician (born 1948)

Member of the Kentucky House of Representatives from the 13th district
- In office January 1, 2019 – January 1, 2021
- Preceded by: DJ Johnson
- Succeeded by: DJ Johnson
- In office January 1, 2007 – January 1, 2017
- Preceded by: Joseph R. Bowen
- Succeeded by: DJ Johnson

Personal details
- Born: February 17, 1948 (age 78) Birmingham, Alabama
- Party: Democratic Party
- Spouse: Cornelia
- Education: University of Wisconsin, University of Kentucky
- Profession: educator

James H. Glenn Jr. (born February 17, 1948) is a former Democratic member of the Kentucky House of Representatives.

== Personal life ==
Jim Glenn was married to his wife Cornelia for 38 years, who died in June 2010. He currently resides in Owensboro and has two children: Kim and James III. Glenn is a devout Christian. Glenn obtained his BS from the University of Wisconsin-Superior in 1971, his MBA from the University of Wisconsin, Oshkosh in 1974, and his EdD from the University of Kentucky in 2001.

== Career ==
Glenn is representing District 13 of Kentucky House since 2019. Glenn was also a candidate for Kentucky state Treasurer in the 2015 Democratic primary.

In 2018, Glenn made history by winning the Kentucky House race by just one vote.

Glenn lost reelection in 2016 and 2020 to Republican DJ Johnson.
