= John W. Stevenson =

American politician, Kentucky (1812–1886)

John Stevenson
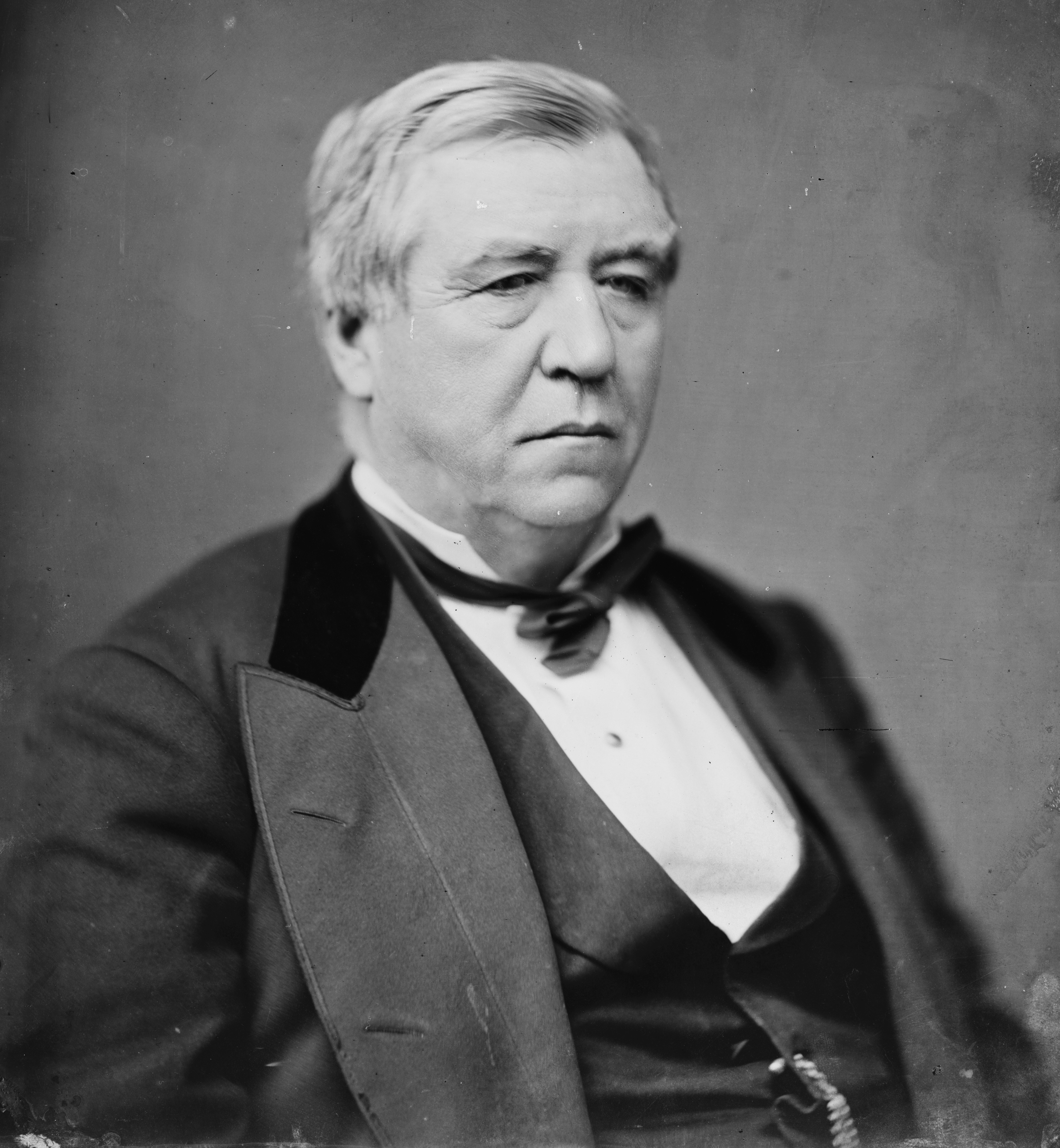

President of the American Bar Association
- In office 1884–1885
- Preceded by: Cortlandt Parker
- Succeeded by: William Allen Butler

Chairman of the Senate Democratic Caucus
- In office December 1873 – March 4, 1877
- Preceded by: Position established
- Succeeded by: William A. Wallace

United States Senator from Kentucky
- In office March 4, 1871 – March 4, 1877
- Preceded by: Thomas C. McCreery
- Succeeded by: James B. Beck

25th Governor of Kentucky
- In office September 8, 1867 – February 13, 1871
- Preceded by: John L. Helm
- Succeeded by: Preston Leslie

19th Lieutenant Governor of Kentucky
- In office September 3, 1867 – September 8, 1867
- Governor: John L. Helm
- Preceded by: Richard Jacob
- Succeeded by: John G. Carlisle

Member of the U.S. House of Representatives from Kentucky's 10th district
- In office March 4, 1857 – March 4, 1861
- Preceded by: Samuel F. Swope
- Succeeded by: John W. Menzies

Personal details
- Born: May 4, 1812 Richmond, Virginia, U.S.
- Died: August 10, 1886 (aged 74) Covington, Kentucky, U.S.
- Resting place: Spring Grove Cemetery
- Party: Democratic
- Spouse: Sibella Winston
- Relatives: Carter Braxton (Great-grandfather); Andrew Stevenson (Father); Willoughby Newton (Cousin)
- Education: Hampden-Sydney College; University of Virginia, Charlottesville (BA)

John White Stevenson (May 4, 1812 – August 10, 1886) was an American politician and attorney who was the 25th governor of Kentucky and represented the state in both houses of the U.S. Congress. The son of former Speaker of the House and U.S. diplomat Andrew Stevenson, John Stevenson graduated from the University of Virginia in 1832 and studied law under his cousin, future Congressman Willoughby Newton. After briefly practicing law in Mississippi, he relocated to Covington, Kentucky, and was elected county attorney. After serving in the Kentucky legislature, he was chosen as a delegate to the state's third constitutional convention in 1849 and was one of three commissioners charged with revising its code of laws, a task finished in 1854. A Democrat, he was elected to two consecutive terms in the U.S. House of Representatives where he supported several proposed compromises to avert the Civil War and blamed the Radical Republicans for their failure.

After losing his reelection bid in 1861, Stevenson, a known Confederate sympathizer, stayed out of public life during the war and was consequently able to avoid being imprisoned, as many other Confederate sympathizers were. In 1867, just five days after John L. Helm and Stevenson were elected governor and lieutenant governor, respectively, Helm died and Stevenson became acting governor. Stevenson subsequently won a special election in 1868 to finish Helm's term. As governor, he opposed federal intervention in what he considered state matters but insisted that blacks' newly granted rights be observed and used the state militia to quell post-war violence in the state. Although a fiscal conservative, he advocated a new tax to benefit education and created the state bureau of education.

In 1871, Stevenson defeated incumbent Thomas C. McCreery for his seat in the U.S. Senate after criticizing McCreery for allegedly supporting the appointment of Stephen G. Burbridge, who was hated by most Kentuckians, to a federal position. In the Senate, he opposed internal improvements and defended a constructionist view of the constitution, resisting efforts to expand the powers expressly granted in that document. Beginning in late 1873, Stevenson functioned as the first chairman (later called floor leader) of the Senate Democratic caucus. He did not seek reelection in 1877, returning to his law practice and accepting future Kentucky Governor William Goebel as a law partner. He chaired the 1880 Democratic National Convention and was elected president of the American Bar Association in 1884. He died in Covington on August 10, 1886, and was buried in Spring Grove Cemetery at Cincinnati, Ohio.

== Early life and family ==
John White Stevenson was born May 4, 1812, in Richmond, Virginia. He was the only child of Andrew and Mary Page (White) Stevenson. His mother—the granddaughter of Carter Braxton, a signer of the Declaration of Independence—died during childbirth. Stevenson was sent to live with his maternal grandparents, John and Judith White, until he was eleven; by then, his father had remarried. His father, a prominent Virginia lawyer, rose to political prominence during Stevenson's childhood. He was elected to Congress, eventually serving as Speaker of the House and was later appointed Envoy Extraordinary and Minister Plenipotentiary to the Court of St. James's (now called the United States Ambassador to the United Kingdom) by President Martin Van Buren, where he engendered much controversy by his pro-slavery practices. Because of his father's position, young Stevenson had met both Thomas Jefferson and James Madison.

Stevenson was educated by private tutors in Virginia and Washington, D.C., where he frequently lived while his father was in Congress. In 1828, at the age of 14, he matriculated from the Hampden–Sydney Academy (now Hampden–Sydney College). Two years later, he transferred to University of Virginia, where he graduated in 1832. After graduation, he read law with his cousin, Willoughby Newton, who would later serve in the U.S. Congress. In 1839, Stevenson was admitted to the bar in Virginia.

Following Madison's advice, Stevenson decided to settle in the west. He traveled on horseback through the western frontier until he reached the Mississippi River, settling at Vicksburg, Mississippi. Vicksburg was a small settlement at the time and did not provide enough work to satisfy him, and, in 1840, he decided to travel to Covington, Kentucky, settling there permanently in 1841. In Covington, he formed a law partnership with Jefferson Phelps, a respected lawyer in the area; the partnership lasted until Phelps' death in 1843.

A devout Episcopalian, Stevenson frequently attended the conventions of that denomination. He was elected as a vestryman of the Trinity Episcopal Church in Covington on November 24, 1842. In 1843, he married Sibella Wilson of Newport, Kentucky. They had five children: Sally C. (Stevenson) Colston, Mary W. (Stevenson) Colston, Judith W. (Stevenson) Winslow, Samuel W. Stevenson, and John W. Stevenson. (Note: Morton gives both Mary and John Stevenson's middle initials as "D." instead of "W." She also omits Samuel W. Stevenson from the list of children, including instead Andrew Stevenson of Philadelphia, Pennsylvania. She later writes that Stevenson was survived by six children, despite having previously listed only five names. Vaux (p. 14) lists sons Andrew and John, although he states that Andrew lives in Montana. Vaux also mentions three unnamed daughters.)

== Political career ==
Soon after arriving in Covington, Stevenson was elected county attorney for Kenton County. He was chosen as a delegate to the 1844 Democratic National Convention and was elected to represent Kenton County in the Kentucky House of Representatives the following year. He was reelected in 1846 and 1848. In 1849, he was chosen as a delegate to the state constitutional convention that produced Kentucky's third state constitution. In 1850, he, Madison C. Johnson, and James Harlan were appointed as commissioners to revise Kentucky's civic and criminal code. Their work, Code of Practise in Civil and Criminal Cases was published in 1854. He was again one of Kentucky's delegates to the Democratic National Conventions in 1848, 1852, and 1856, serving as a presidential elector in 1852 and 1856.

=== U.S. Representative ===
In 1857, Stevenson was elected to the first of two consecutive terms in the U.S. House of Representatives. For the duration of his tenure in that body, he served on the Committee on Elections. He favored admitting Kansas to the Union under the Lecompton Constitution.

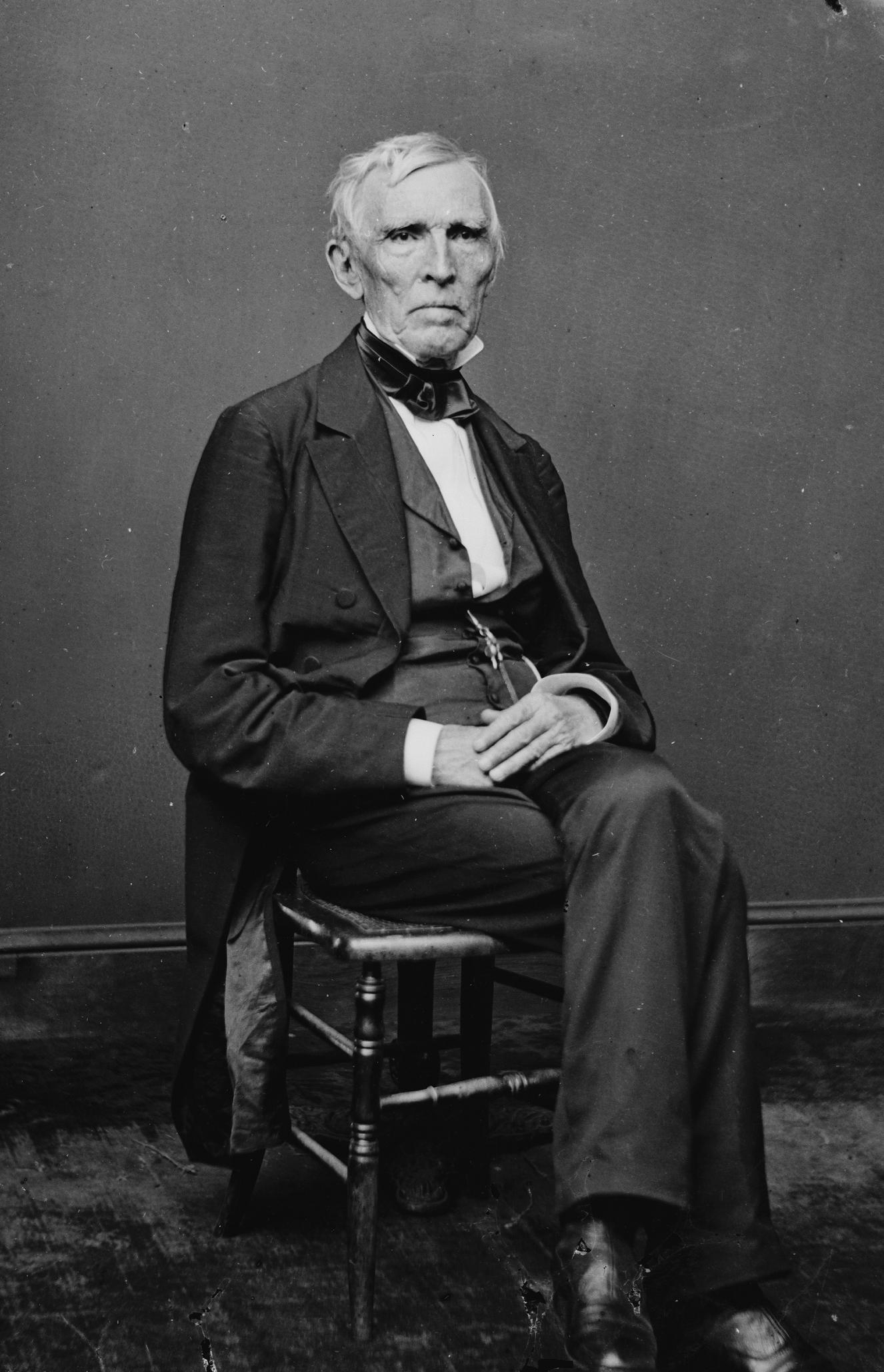
John J. Crittenden proposed a compromise advocated by Stevenson.

Like many Kentuckians, Stevenson was sympathetic to the southern states' position in the lead-up to the Civil War, but he opposed secession as a means of dealing with sectional tensions. In the 1860 presidential election, he supported his close friend, John C. Breckinridge. Desiring to avert the Civil War, he advocated acceptance of the several proposed compromises, including the Crittenden Compromise, authored by fellow Kentuckian John J. Crittenden. He blamed the Radical Republicans' rigid adherence to their demands for the failure of all such proposed compromises, and on January 30, 1861, denounced them in a speech that the Dictionary of American Biography called the most notable of his career in the House.

Stevenson was defeated for reelection in 1861. For the duration of the war, which lasted until April 1865, he stayed out of public life in order to avoid being arrested as many other Confederate sympathizers were. After the war, he was a delegate to the National Union Party's convention in Philadelphia, Pennsylvania, in 1865. He was a supporter of the Reconstruction policies of President Andrew Johnson.

=== Governor of Kentucky ===
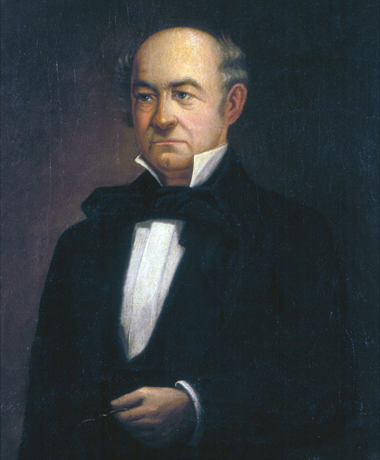
John L. Helm's death elevated Stevenson to governor.

Ex-Confederates dominated the Kentucky Democratic convention that met in Frankfort on February 22, 1867. John L. Helm, father of the late Confederate general Benjamin Hardin Helm, was nominated for governor and Stevenson was nominated for lieutenant governor. The entire Democratic slate of candidates was elected, including Stevenson, who received 88,222 votes to R. Tarvin Baker's 32,505 and H. Taylor's 11,473. The only non-Confederate sympathizer to win election that year was George Madison Adams, congressman for the state's 8th district who, although a Democrat, was a former federal soldier. Helm took the oath of office on his sick bed at his home in Elizabethtown, Kentucky, on September 3, 1867. He died five days later, and Stevenson was sworn in as governor on September 13. Among his first acts as governor were the appointments of Frank Lane Wolford, a former Union soldier, as adjutant general and Fayette Hewitt, a former Confederate soldier, as state quartermaster general.

Because Helm died so soon after taking office, a special election for the remainder of his term was set for August 1868. Democrats held a convention in Frankfort on February 22, 1868, and nominated Stevenson to finish out Helm's term. R. Tarvin Baker, formerly Stevenson's opponent in the election for lieutenant governor, was the choice of the Republicans. The Republicans faced many disadvantages, including the national party's persecution of President Johnson and a lack of local organization in many Kentucky counties. Despite Stevenson's shortcomings as a public speaker, he was elected in a landslide—115,560 to 26,605. At the time, it was the largest majority obtained by any candidate in a Kentucky election.

==== Civil rights ====
Post-war Kentucky Democrats had split into two factions—the more conservative Bourbon Democrats and the more progressive New Departure Democrats. Stevenson governed moderately, giving concessions to both sides. He urged the immediate restoration of all rights to ex-Confederates and denounced Congress for failing to seat a portion of the Kentucky delegation because they had sided with the Confederacy. A champion of states' rights, he resisted federal measures he saw as violating the sovereignty of the states and vehemently denounced the proposed Fifteenth Amendment. Following Stevenson's lead, the General Assembly refused to pass either the Fourteenth or Fifteenth Amendment, but after their passage by a constitutional majority of the states Stevenson generally insisted that blacks' newly granted rights not be infringed upon. He was silent, however, when state legislators and officials from various cities used lengthy residency restrictions and redrawn district and municipal boundaries to exclude black voters from specific elections. His 1867 plea for legislators to call a constitutional convention to revise the state's pro-slavery constitution to better conform to post-war reality was completely ignored.

Stevenson opposed almost every effort to expand blacks' rights beyond the minimums assured by federal amendments and legislation. The Civil Rights Act of 1866 guaranteed that blacks could testify against whites in federal courts, but he opposed New Departure Democrats when they insisted that Kentucky amend its laws to also allow black testimony against whites in state courts, and the measure failed in the 1867 legislative session. Later that year, the Kentucky Court of Appeals declared the Civil Rights Act unconstitutional, but a federal court soon overturned that decision. Stevenson backed Bourbon Democrats' appeal of that decision to the Supreme Court of the United States. By 1871, however, he had changed his mind and supported blacks' right to testify. Despite Stevenson's support, the measure failed in the General Assembly again in 1871, but it passed the following year, after Stevenson had left office.

In the 1870 election, the first state election in which blacks were allowed to vote, Stevenson warned that violence against them would not be tolerated. Although he relied on local authorities to suppress any incidents, he offered rewards for the apprehension of perpetrators of election-related violence. Stevenson also recommended that the carrying of concealed weapons be outlawed. The General Assembly passed the requested legislation on March 22, 1871. The law imposed small fines for the first offense, but the amount rapidly increased for subsequent infractions in order to deter repeat offenders.

==== State matters ====
In Stevenson's first message to the legislature, he called on legislators to finally decide whether the state capital would remain at Frankfort or be moved to Lexington or Louisville, as some had wanted. His address made it clear that he favored keeping the capital at Frankfort, but he noted that additional space was needed at the present capitol building because the existing building could not continue to house both the state treasurer and auditor. He laid out a vision for an addition to the capitol that would make it more spacious and more grandiose. To pay for the expansion, the fiscally conservative Stevenson pressed the federal government to pay claims due Kentucky from Civil War expenses. By the end of his term, the state had collected over $1.5 million in claims. The legislature, however, disregarded his plan for expanding the capitol, instead opting to construct a separate executive office building next to the capitol.

Stevenson also advocated careful study of the state's finances to deal with increasing expenditures. He insisted that the state stop covering its short-term indebtedness using bonds. However, Stevenson was willing to tax to benefit segregation in schools, and helped create the state bureau of education in 1870. Because most blacks possessed little property of significant value, the new tax yielded little revenue to support their educational institutions. State legislators rejected his 1870 proposal to create a state bureau of immigration and statistics to spur interest in and migration to the state. He did persuade the legislators to make some improvements in the state's penal and eleemosynary institutions, including establishing a House of Reform for juvenile offenders.

Mob violence, much of it perpetrated by vigilantes calling themselves "Regulators" who felt that local authorities had failed in their duties to protect the people, was an ongoing problem during Stevenson's administration. In September 1867, Stevenson urged all Kentuckians to defer to local authorities and ordered that all vigilante groups be disbanded. On October 1, however, a group calling themselves "Rousey's band," led by a man named Smith Rousey, began perpetrating anti-Regulator violence in Marion County. Stevenson dispatched Adjutant General Wolford to Marion County, authorizing him to use the state militia to quell the violence if necessary. Wolford called out three companies of militia who suppressed "Rousey's band" and sent another to put down a similar movement in Boyle County. Later in October, Stevenson dispatched the state militia to Mercer County, and militiamen were dispatched to Boyle, Garrard, and Lincoln counties in 1869. The governor declared that he would never hesitate to send troops "whenever it becomes necessary for the arrest and bringing to justice of all those who combine together, no matter under what pretense, to trample the law under their feet by acts of personal violence."

=== U.S. Senator ===
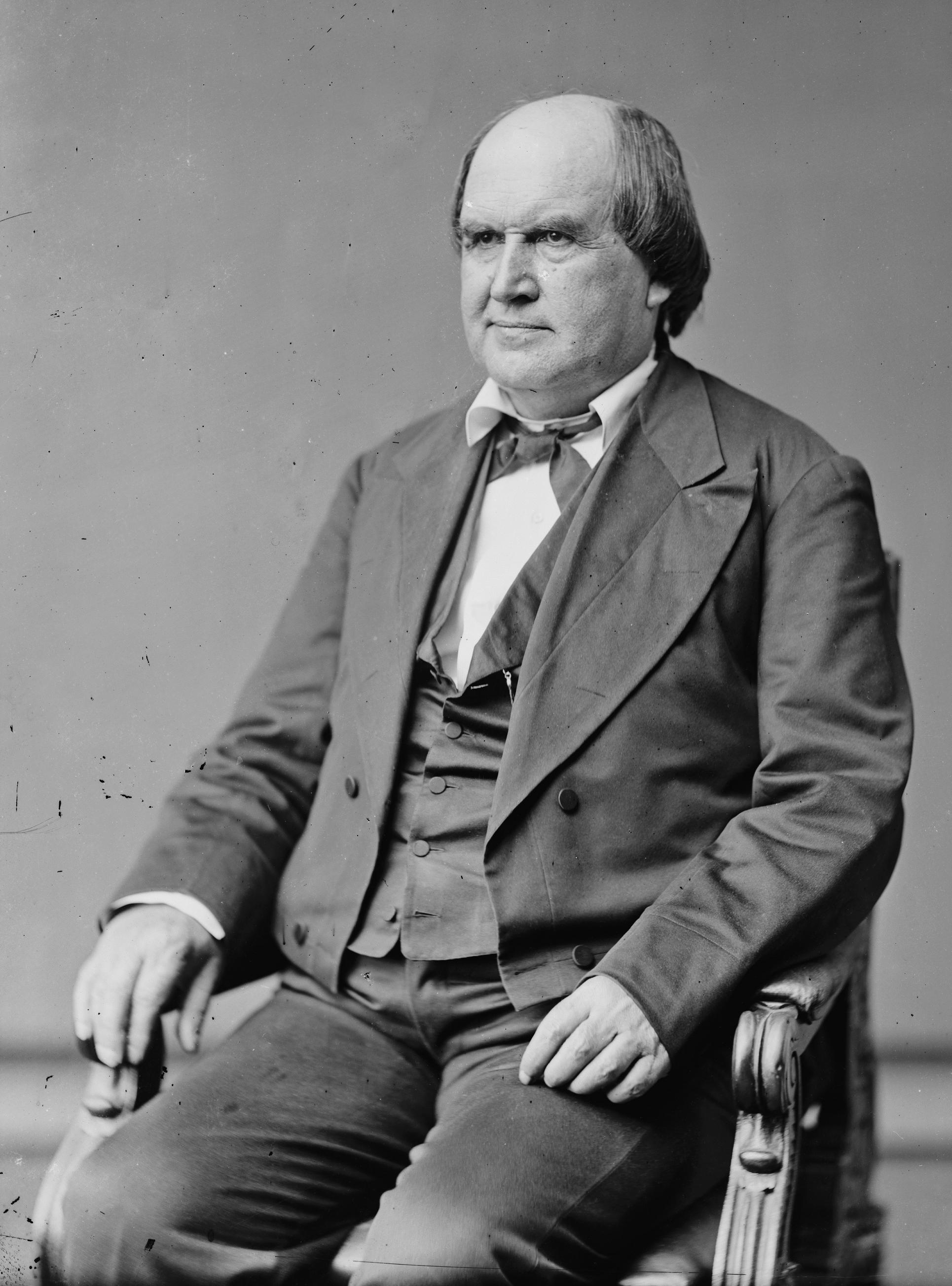
Thomas C. McCreery

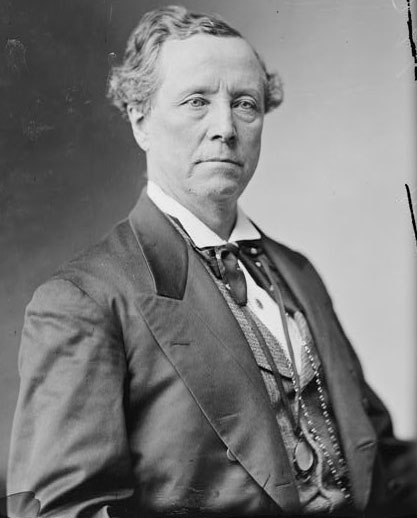
Thomas Laurens Jones

Beginning in late 1869, Stevenson attacked Kentucky Senator Thomas C. McCreery and Representative Thomas Laurens Jones for allegedly supporting President Ulysses S. Grant's nomination of former Union General Stephen G. Burbridge to a federal position in the revenue service. Although born in northern Kentucky, Burbridge had commanded colored troops during the Civil War, and had also been specifically ordered to suppress Confederate guerillas in his home state. Kentucky's General Assembly had sought to bring him to trial for war crimes in 1863 and 1864. Historian E. Merton Coulter wrote of Burbridge: "[The people of Kentucky] relentlessly pursued him, the most bitterly hated of all Kentuckians, and so untiring were their efforts, that it finally came to the point where he had not a friend left in the state who would raise his voice to defend him." Stevenson's attacks on McCreery and Jones were likely designed to discredit them both in advance of the expiration of McCreery's Senate term in 1870. McCreery vigorously denied Stevenson's charges and eventually challenged him to a duel. Stevenson declined the challenge, citing his Christian beliefs. The General Assembly met to choose McCreery's successor in December 1869 and, on the fifth ballot, chose Stevenson over McCreery for the six-year Senate term. Stevenson resigned the governorship on February 13, 1871, in advance of the March congressional session.

In the Senate, Stevenson was a conservative stalwart, steadfastly opposing spending on internal improvements and maintaining a strict constructionist view of the constitution. He urged his fellow senators to oppose the Civil Rights Act of 1871, claiming that its provision that the president could suspend the right of habeas corpus in cases where he believed violence was imminent amounted to giving the chief executive the powers of a dictator. He also opposed the appropriation of federal money to fund the Centennial Exposition in Philadelphia, Pennsylvania, because he did not believe Congress was given the authority to make such an allocation under the Constitution.

At the 1872 Democratic National Convention, Stevenson received the votes of Delaware's six delegates for the Democratic vice-presidential nomination, although Benjamin Gratz Brown was ultimately nominated. In February 1873, Vice-President Schuyler Colfax named Stevenson as one of five members of the Morrill Commission to investigate New Hampshire Senator James W. Patterson's involvement in the Crédit Mobilier of America scandal. Stevenson and fellow Senator John P. Stockton of New Jersey both asked to be removed from the commission, but the Senate refused to grant their request. On February 27, 1873, the commission recommended Patterson's expulsion from the Senate, but the chamber adjourned on March 4 without acting on the recommendation. Patterson's term ended with the end of the session, and he was not re-elected, rendering moot further consideration of the matter.

From December 1873 until the expiration of his term in 1877, Stevenson was generally recognized as the chairman (later known as the floor leader) of the minority Democratic caucus in the Senate; he was the first person to have acted in the capacity. During the Forty-fourth Congress, he chaired the Committee on Revolutionary Claims. He did not seek reelection at the end of his term. In the disputed 1876 presidential election, he was one of the visiting statesmen who went to New Orleans, Louisiana, and concluded that the election had been fairly conducted in that state.

== Later life and death ==
After his service in the Senate, Stevenson returned to his law practice in Covington. In addition, he accepted a position teaching criminal law and contracts at the University of Cincinnati College of Law. He remained interested in politics and was chosen chairman of the 1879 Democratic state convention in Louisville and president of the 1880 Democratic National Convention in Cincinnati, Ohio.

In 1883, the American Bar Association began exploring the concept of dual federalism. Because of his personal acquaintance with James Madison, whom he characterized as a proponent of dual federalism, Stevenson delivered an address on the subject at the Association's annual meeting. Stevenson maintained that Madison believed strongly in the rights of the sovereign states and regarded a Supreme Court appeal as "a remedy for trespass on the reserved rights of the states by unconstitutional acts of Congress." Stevenson was elected its president that year's and his address published. Association member Richard Vaux characterized Stevenson's presidential report reviewing state and federal legislation in 1885 as "most interesting and valuable to the profession".

Among the men who studied law under Stevenson in his later years were future U.S. Treasury Secretary John G. Carlisle and future Kentucky Governor William Goebel. Goebel eventually became Stevenson's law partner and the executor of his will.

In early August 1886, Stevenson traveled to Sewanee, Tennessee, to attend the commencement ceremonies of Sewanee University. While there, he fell ill and was rushed back to his home in Covington, where he died on August 10, 1886. He was buried in Spring Grove Cemetery in Cincinnati.

== Notes ==
U.S. House of Representatives
Preceded by Samuel F. Swope	Member of the U.S. House of Representatives from Kentucky's 10th congressional district 1857–1861	Succeeded by John W. Menzies
Political offices
Preceded by Richard Jacob	Lieutenant Governor of Kentucky; 1867	Succeeded by John G. Carlisle
Preceded by John L. Helm	Governor of Kentucky; 1867–1871	Succeeded by Preston Leslie
Party political offices
Preceded by John L. Helm	Democratic nominee for Governor of Kentucky; 1868	Succeeded by Preston Leslie
New office	Chair of the Senate Democratic Caucus; 1873–1877	Succeeded by William A. Wallace
U.S. Senate
Preceded by Thomas C. McCreery	U.S. Senator (Class 2) from Kentucky; 1871–1877; Served alongside: Garrett Davis, Willis Machen, Thomas C. McCreery	Succeeded by James B. Beck
Preceded by William Gannaway Brownlow	Chair of the Senate Revolutionary Claims Committee; 1875–1877	Succeeded by John W. Johnston
