= E. Louis Johnson =

American politician (1937–2017)

Louis Johnson

Member of the Kentucky House of Representatives from the 13th district
- In office January 1, 1978 – January 1, 1995
- Preceded by: Charles Wible
- Succeeded by: Brian Crall

Personal details
- Born: August 8, 1937
- Died: December 19, 2017 (aged 80)
- Party: Democratic

Edward Louis Johnson (August 8, 1937 – December 19, 2017) was an American politician from Kentucky who was a member of the Kentucky House of Representatives from 1978 to 1995.

Johnson was first elected in 1977 after incumbent representative Charles Wible retired to unsuccessfully run for the Kentucky Senate. He did not seek reelection in 1994 and was succeeded by Republican Brian Crall.

He died in December 2017 at age 80.
