= Owensboro Public Schools =

School district in Kentucky, United States

Owensboro Public Schools is a school district that manages the public schools in Owensboro, Kentucky, USA. This school system is independent of the county school system, Daviess County Public Schools.

== Owensboro High School ==
Owensboro High School is a high school located at 1800 Frederica Street in Owensboro, Kentucky. The school's newspaper is "The Scoop" and its yearbook is the Owensborian. Sports teams and other organizations are usually titled "Red Devils." The swim team is the "Devilfish" while the dance team is the "Devilettes." Ordell, a red blob-like devil with horns and a tail, is the school's anthropomorphic mascot. The primary school colors are red and black, and the secondary color is white.

== Owensboro Middle School ==
Beginning the 2010–2011 school year, Owensboro Middle School will hold students in grades 5–8. The students will be separated into two buildings: a "North Campus," serving grades 7-8 and a "South Campus," serving grades 5–6. The North Campus is located at 1300 Booth Avenue and the South Campus is located at 2631 South Griffith Avenue. The two campuses are separated by a football field that is used by both campuses. The middle school bears the same "Red Devil" team names as Owensboro High School.

== Elementary schools ==
Cravens Elementary
Estes Elementary
Foust Elementary
Newton Parrish Elementary
Sutton Elementary

== Alternative School ==
Seven Hills Alternative School
