= James B. Beck =

American politician (1822–1890)

James Beck
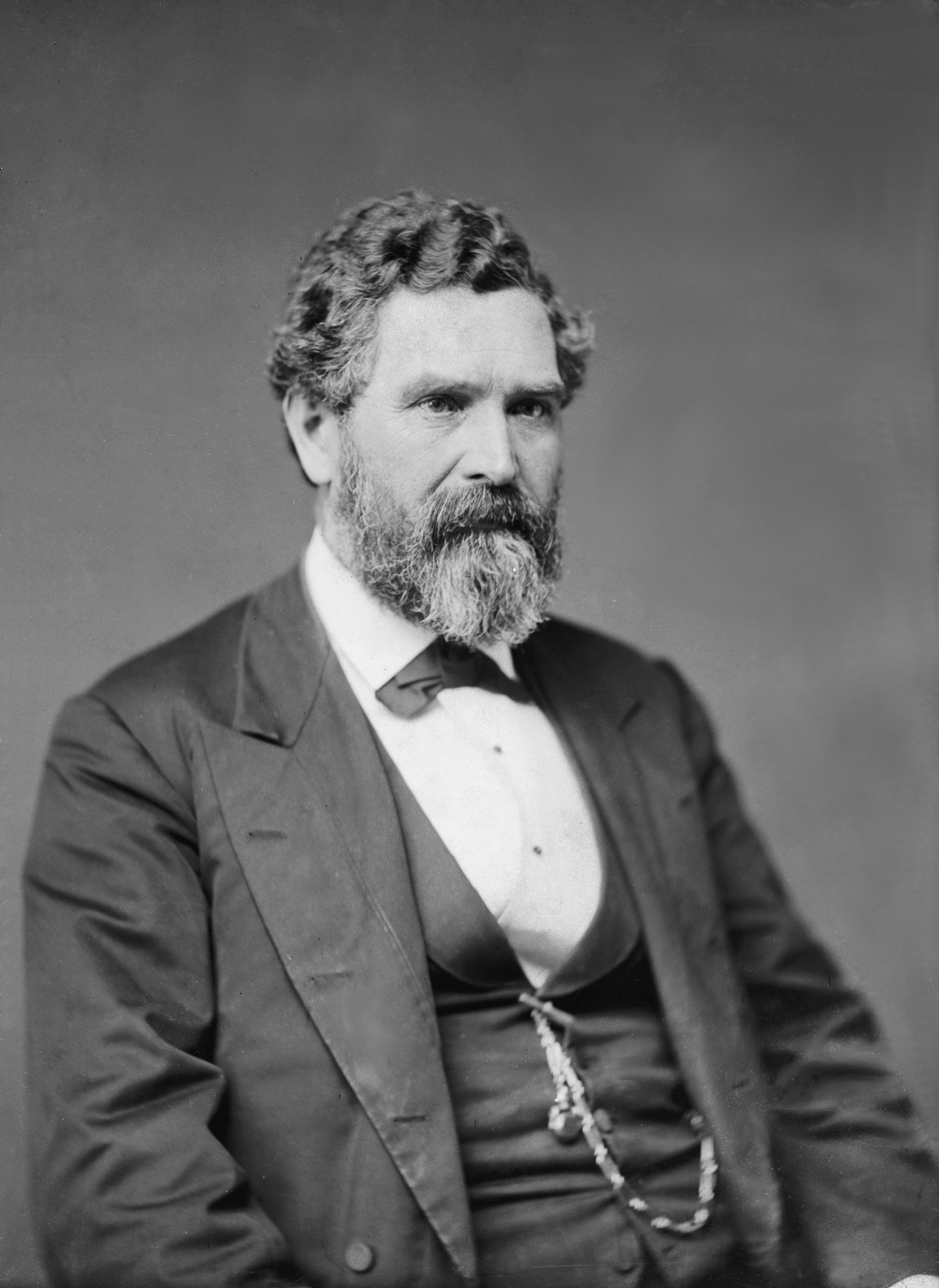
- Beck, 1865–1880

Chairman of the Senate Democratic Caucus
- In office March 4, 1885 – May 3, 1890
- Preceded by: George H. Pendleton
- Succeeded by: Arthur Pue Gorman

United States Senator from Kentucky
- In office March 4, 1877 – May 3, 1890
- Preceded by: John W. Stevenson
- Succeeded by: John G. Carlisle

Member of the U.S. House of Representatives from Kentucky's 7th district
- In office March 4, 1867 – March 3, 1875
- Preceded by: George S. Shanklin
- Succeeded by: Joseph Clay Stiles Blackburn

Personal details
- Born: James Burnie Beck; February 13, 1822 Dumfriesshire, Scotland, United Kingdom
- Died: May 3, 1890 (aged 68) Washington, D.C., U.S.
- Resting place: Lexington Cemetery; Lexington, Kentucky
- Party: Democratic
- Education: Transylvania University (BA)

James Burnie Beck (February 13, 1822 – May 3, 1890) was a Scottish-American United States representative and senator from Kentucky.

== Life ==
Born in Dumfriesshire, Scotland, Beck migrated to the United States in 1838 and settled in Wyoming County, New York. He moved to Lexington, Kentucky in 1843 and graduated from Transylvania University in 1846. Beck was admitted to the bar and commenced the practice of law in Lexington. Until shortly before the Civil War, he was a law partner of John C. Breckinridge, the U.S. Vice President who became a Confederate general; during the Civil War, Beck was interrogated by a military commission about his knowledge of his former partner's activities.

After the war, Beck was elected as a Democrat to the United States House of Representatives serving Kentucky's 7th congressional district. He was appointed to the Select Committee on Reconstruction where it was expected that as a newcomer and an immigrant he would be no obstacle to Republican intentions, but he immediately became a tenacious advocate of the rights of the defeated states. A White supremacist, he opposed civil rights for African Americans. He was reelected three times as a Representative, serving from March 4, 1867, to March 3, 1875.

In 1876, Beck was appointed a member of the commission to define the boundary line between Maryland and Virginia. He was then elected to the United States Senate in 1876, being reelected twice, serving from March 4, 1877, until his death in Washington, D.C. on May 3, 1890. Long-time Washington journalist Benjamin Perley Poore described Beck during his time in the Senate as "a stalwart, farmer-like looking man, with that overcharged brain which made his tongue at times falter because he could not utter what his furious, fiery eloquence prompted." While in the Senate, Beck was the Democratic Conference Chairman from 1885 to 1890, and the chairman of the Committee on Transportation Routes to the Seaboard. He was prominent in the discussion of tariff and currency questions.

He is interred at Lexington Cemetery. His son, George T. Beck, was a noted politician and entrepreneur in the state of Wyoming.

== See also ==
- List of United States senators born outside the United States
- List of members of the United States Congress who died in office (1790–1899)

U.S. House of Representatives
Preceded by George S. Shanklin	Member of the U.S. House of Representatives from Kentucky's 7th congressional district 1867–1875	Succeeded by Joseph Clay Stiles Blackburn
U.S. Senate
Preceded by John W. Stevenson	U.S. Senator (Class 2) from Kentucky; 1877–1890; Served alongside: Thomas C. McCreery, John Stuart Williams, Joseph Clay Stiles Blackburn	Succeeded by John G. Carlisle
Preceded by Angus Cameron	Chair of the Senate Seaboard Transportation Routes Committee; 1879–1881	Succeeded by Benjamin Harrison
Party political offices
Preceded by George H. Pendleton	Chair of the Senate Democratic Caucus; 1885–1890	Succeeded by Arthur Pue Gorman
