= United States Senate Committee on Transportation Routes to the Seaboard =

The United States Senate Committee on Transportation Routes to the Seaboard, was a Senate committee, initially authorized by Senate resolution as a select committee on December 16, 1872. The select committee, also known as the Windom Select Committee for its first chairman, William Windom, submitted their significant report regarding current rail and water transportation on April 24, 1874; it was ordered to be printed the same day. The committee became a standing committee on March 19, 1879, with little documented activity, and continued to exist until 1921.

== Select committee ==
Originally composed of seven members, it was enlarged to nine on March 26, 1873, during the special session of the Senate held after March 4; the Committee underwent further personnel changes the following year and was ultimately composed of William Windom, of Minnesota; John Sherman, of Ohio; Roscoe Conkling, of New York; J. Rodman West, of Louisiana; Simon B. Conover, of Florida; John H. Mitchell, of Oregon; Thomas M. Norwood, of Georgia; Henry G. Davis, of West Virginia; and John W. Johnston, of Virginia. When enlarged, the Senate adopted a resolution authorizing the Committee to sit at such places as they might designate during the recess and to investigate and report upon the subject of transportation between the interior and the seaboard; it also authorized the Committee to employ a staff and provided for actual and necessary expenses attending such investigation upon vouchers approved by the chairman.

=== Investigation and report ===
The Committee visited various portions of the country and collected a mass of useful information relating to rail and water transportation in the United States at the time. Viewing the movement toward developing the inland waterways of the country, 35 years later in 1908, the Inland Waterways Commission considered the select committee's report the third epoch in this movement, but notes, "although the plans and recommendations of Senator (and Secretary) Windom and his colleagues received less attention than was anticipated, of course by reason of the rapid growth of interest in railways." It goes no to say: "Perhaps the most notable result, albeit rather an indirect than a direct one, appeared in the improvement of the Passes at the mouth of the Mississippi with the development of navigation in that river through the Eads jetty system, which opened an era in river control by engineering devices. The Windom report, too, is of both historic and practical interest, although the appended matter pertaining to special localities and passing conditions is of less value."

The committee's report was submitted to the Senate April 24, 1874, and on the same day was ordered to be printed. The results of its investigations were published in two volumes containing more than 1,400 pages, including an appendix of 232 pages. It contains a report by Henry G. Davis as a committee of one, in regard to the James River and Kanawha Canal; minority reports by Roscoe Conkling for himself, and jointly by members Norwood, Davis, and Johnston. Both Conkling and the three named members appear to have concurred mainly in the Windom Committee report, but did not agree with the report as to certain matters of law which are indicated in the Summary of Conclusions and Recommendations. It appears that members Sherman, Conover, West, and Mitchell concurred with chairman Windom.

=== Summary conclusions and recommendations ===
The Committee respectfully submitted the following general summary of the conclusions:

"Firstly. One of the most important problems demanding solution at the hands of the American statesman, is by what means shall cheap and ample facilities be provided for the interchange of commodities between the different sections of our widely extended country."

"Secondly. In the selection of means for the accomplishment of this object, Congress may, in its discretion and under its responsibility to the people, prescribe the rules and regulations by which the instruments, vehicles, and agencies employed in transporting persons or commodities from one State into or through another shall be governed, whether such transportation be by land or by water."

"Thirdly. The power "to regulate commerce" includes the power to aid and facilitate it by the employment of such means as may be appropriate and plainly adapted to that end; and hence Congress may, in its discretion improve, or create, channels of commerce on land, or by water."

"Fourthly. A remedy for some of the defects and abuses which prevail under existing systems of transportation, may be provided by direct congressional regulation, but for reasons, stated at length in this report, it is seriously doubted if facilities, sufficiently cheap and ample to meet the just and reasonable requirements of commerce, can ever be obtained by this method."

"Fifthly. Whatever may be the limit of the power of Congress over interstate commerce, it is believed that the attempt to regulate the business of transportation by general congressional enactments establishing rates and fares on 1,300 railways, aggregating nearly one-half the railway mileage of the world, and embracing an almost infinite variety of circumstances and conditions, requires more definite and detailed information than is now in the possession of Congress or of your Committee. Believing that any ill-advised measures, in this direction, would tend to postpone indefinitely the attainment of the desired object — cheap transportation — the Committee deem it expedient to confine their recommendations, in this regard, to such measures only as may be enacted with entire safety, reserving other matters of legislation for further inquiry and consideration."

Adroitly phrasing their initial conclusions on such contested historical issues as the Commerce Clause, the need for internal improvements and their funding, but with the continuing lack of political consensus, and insufficient data, the committee recommended the following "for present action", then continued with their conclusions

"1. That all railway companies, freight-lines, and other persons, or organizations of common carriers, engaged in transporting passengers or freights from one State into or through another, be required, under proper penalties, to make publication at every point of shipment from one State to another, of their rates and fares, embracing all the particulars regarding distance, classifications, rates, special tariffs, drawbacks, &c., and that they be prohibited from increasing such rates above the limit named in the publication, without reasonable notice to the public, to be prescribed by law."

"2. That combinations and consolidations with parallel or competing lines are evils of such magnitude as to demand prompt and vigorous measures for their prevention."

"3. That all railway companies, freight-lines, and other organizations of common carriers, employed in transporting grain from one State into or through another, should be required, under proper regulations and penalties to be provided by law, to receipt for quantity and to deliver the same at its destination."

"4. That all railway companies and freight organizations, receiving freights in one State to be delivered in another, and whose lines touch at any river or lake port, be prohibited from charging more to or from such port than for any greater distance on the same line." A page footnote states: "This provision, it is believed, will prevent the discriminations now practiced against such ports, and will enable States which are separated from water-lines by intervening States to reach such lines at reasonable cost. Congress has no power to regulate commerce wholly within a State, and hence States bordering upon such water-lines will regulate the rates to ports within their own territory."

"5. Stock-inflations, generally known as "stock-waterings," are wholly indefensible; but the remedy for this evil seems to fall peculiarly within the province of the States who have created the corporations from which such practices proceed. The evil is believed to be of such magnitude as to require prompt and efficient State action for its prevention, and to justify any measures that may be proper and within the range of national authority."

"6. It is believed by the committee that great good would result from the passage of State laws prohibiting officers of railway companies from owning or holding, directly or indirectly, any interest in any "non-cooperative freight-line" or car company, operated upon the railroad with which they are connected in such official capacity."

"7. For the purpose of procuring and laying before Congress and the country such complete and reliable information concerning the business of transportation and the wants of commerce, as will enable Congress to legislate intelligently upon the subject, it is recommended that a Bureau of Commerce, in one of the Executive Departments of the Government, be charged with the duty of collecting and reporting to Congress information concerning our internal trade and commerce; and be clothed with authority of law, under regulations to be prescribed by the head of such Department, to require each and every railway and other transportation company engaged in inter-State transportation to make a report, under oath of the proper officer of such company, at least once each year, which report should embrace, among other facts, the following, namely: 1st. The rates and fares charged from all points of shipment on its line in one State to all points of destination in another State, including classifications and distances, and all drawbacks, deductions, and discriminations; 2d. A full and detailed statement of receipts and expenditures, including the compensation paid to officers, agents, and employes of the company; 3d. The amount of stock and bonds issued, the price at which they were sold, and the disposition made of the funds received from such sale; 4th. The amount and value of commodities transported during the year, as nearly as the same can be ascertained, together with such other facts as may be required by the head of such Bureau, under the authority of law."

"Sixth. Though the existence of the Federal power to regulate commerce to the extent maintained in this report is believed to be essential to the maintenance of perfect equality among the States as to commercial rights; to the prevention of unjust and invidious distinctions which local jealousies or interests might be disposed to introduce; to the proper restraints of consolidated corporate power, and to the correction of many of its existing evils, yet your committee are unanimously of the opinion that the problem of cheap transportation is to be solved through competition, as hereinafter stated, rather than by direct congressional regulation of existing lines."

"Seventh. Competition, which is to secure and maintain cheap transportation, must embrace two essential conditions: 1st, it must be controlled by a power with which combination will be impossible; 2d, it must operate through cheaper and more ample channels of commerce than are now provided."

"Eighth. Railway competition, when regulated by its own laws, will not effect the object; because it exists only to a very limited extent in certain localities; it is always unreliable and inefficient; and it invariably, ends in combination. Hence, additional railway-lines, under the control of private corporations, will afford no substantial relief, because self-interest will inevitably lead them into combination with existing lines."

"Ninth. The only means of securing and maintaining reliable and effective competition between railways is through national or State ownership, or control, of one or more lines, which, being unable to enter into combinations, will serve as regulators of other lines."

"Tenth. One or more double-track freight-railways, honestly and thoroughly constructed, owned or controlled by the Government, and operated at a low rate of speed, would doubtless be able to carry at much less cost than can be done under the present system of operating fast and slow trains on the same road; and, being incapable of entering into combinations, would no doubt serve as a very valuable regulator of all existing railroads within the range of their influence."

"Eleventh. The uniform testimony deduced from practical results in this country, and throughout the commercial world is, that water-routes, when properly located, not only afford the cheapest and best-known means of transport for all heavy, bulky, and cheap commodities, but that they are also the natural competitors, and most effective regulators of railway-transportation."

"Twelfth. The above facts and conclusions, together with the remarkable physical adaptation of our country for cheap and ample water-communications, point unerringly to the improvement of our great natural water-ways, and their connection by canals, or by short freight-railway portages under control of the Government, as the obvious and certain solution of the problem of cheap transportation.

"Thirteenth. After a most careful consideration of the merits of various proposed improvements, taking into account the cost, practicability, and probable advantages of each, the Committee have come to the unanimous conclusion that the following are the most feasible and advantageous channels of commerce to be created or improved by the National Government in case Congress shall act upon this subject, viz:

"1st. The Mississippi River."

"2d. A continuous water-line of adequate capacity from the Mississippi River to the city of New York, via the northern lakes."

"3d. A route adequate to the wants of commerce, through the central tier of States, from the Mississippi River, via the Ohio and Kanawha Rivers, to a point in West Virginia, and thence by canal and slack-water, or by a freight-railway, to tide-water, in Virginia."

"4th. A route from the Mississippi River, via the Ohio and Tennessee Rivers, to a point in Alabama or Tennessee, and thence by canal and slack-water, or by a freight-railway, to the ocean."

In the discussion of these four existing and proposed channels of commerce, we shall, for the sake of brevity, designate them respectively, the "Mississippi route," "Northern route," "Central route," and "Southern route." The report then goes into more detail on each.

=== Following events ===
The select committee's analytical report, which recommended a Bureau of Commerce, would have all the basic elements of the Interstate Commerce Commission, as created thirteen years later, in January 1887.

=== Chairmen of the Committee (Select), 1872-1879 ===
Name	Party	State	Years
William Windom	Republican	Minnesota	1872–1876
John H. Mitchell	Republican	Oregon	1876–1877
Angus Cameron	Republican	Wisconsin	1877–1879

== Standing committee ==
According to historian George H. Haynes, it was said in 1917 that its standing committee had the dubious distinction of never having met in its (then) 38 years. There is no evidence to show that the Committee on Transportation Routes to the Seaboard ever convened before its termination in 1921, and, not surprisingly, few papers were ever referred to it. According to the National Archives, official records of the committee consist of little more than a few printed reports, petitions, and memorials.

=== Chairmen of the Committee (Standing), 1879-1921 ===
Name	Party	State	Years
James Beck	Democratic	Kentucky	1879–1881
Benjamin Harrison	Republican	Indiana	1881–1883
Nelson Aldrich	Republican	Rhode Island	1883–1887
John H. Mitchell	Republican	Oregon	1887–1889
Matthew S. Quay	Republican	Pennsylvania	1889–1891
Jacob H. Gallinger	Republican	New Hampshire	1891–1893
John L.M. Irby	Democratic	South Carolina	1893–1895
George McBride	Republican	Oregon	1895–1897
Thomas C. Platt	Republican	New York	1897–1899
Joseph V. Quarles	Republican	Wisconsin	1899–1901
William P. Dillingham	Republican	Vermont	1901–1903
Robert J. Gamble	Republican	South Dakota	1903–1909
George T. Oliver	Republican	Pennsylvania	1909–1911
Ellison D. Smith	Democratic	South Carolina	1911–1913
Porter J. McCumber	Republican	North Dakota	1913–1919
Duncan U. Fletcher	Democratic	Florida	1919–1921
