= C.L. Applegate and Company =

1876 map of Yelvington, Kentucky from the Illustrated Historical Atlas Map of Daviess County, Kentucky, pages 30-31, published by Leo McDonough & Company.

C. L. Appelgate and Company was a bourbon whiskey distillery established and located in Yelvington, Kentucky. It was owned, built and operated by Colonel C.L. Applegate and his brother Edward Applegate sometime between 1875 and 1880 on the west of the road between Maceo and Yelvington, Kentucky, today known as KY Hwy 405, on land purchased from Sam Taylor Hawes of Yelvington.

== History ==
C.L. Applegate and Company was built sometime between 1875 and 1880 on the road currently known as Kentucky Highway 405. The plant, which made only bourbon whiskey under the names Rosebud and Beechwood, had a mashing capacity of nearly 250 bushels a day. The distillery discontinued product in the fall of 1890 due to a water shortage but had whiskey in its warehouses until 1908 or 1909.

In 1906 Col. Applegate along with his brother, Edward, arranged new financing for the distillery with Mr. Henry Vogt of the Vogt Machine Company in Louisville, Kentucky and began operating again. They continued production until the early spring of 1907, at which time they closed down.

By the fall of 1908 and 1909 bourbon whiskey still remained in the warehouses. Portions of the plant remained well into the mid-1900s. All that remains today are the distillery ponds.

Internal Revenue Service recorded warehouse transactions for The C. L. Applegate Distillery as follows: 1898: C L Applegate & Co.: Code T. (Spirits were withdrawn upon payment of tax) and Code W (Spirits remained in the warehouse at the close of the year).

Information from insurance underwriter records compiled in 1892 suggest that the distillery property included a two frame warehouses, both with metal or slate roofs. Warehouse "A" was 115 ft north of the still house, warehouse "B" was 107 ft south. The distillery itself was constructed similarly. The property also included cattle and a barn. The owner is recorded as being C. L. Applegate & Co.

== See also ==
- List of cocktails with bourbon
- List of whisky brands
- Corn whiskey
- Rye whiskey
- Moonshine
- Tennessee whiskey
- American whiskey
- American Whiskey Trail
- Bourbon Trail
- Bottled in bond
