= Garrett Davis =

American politician (1801–1872)

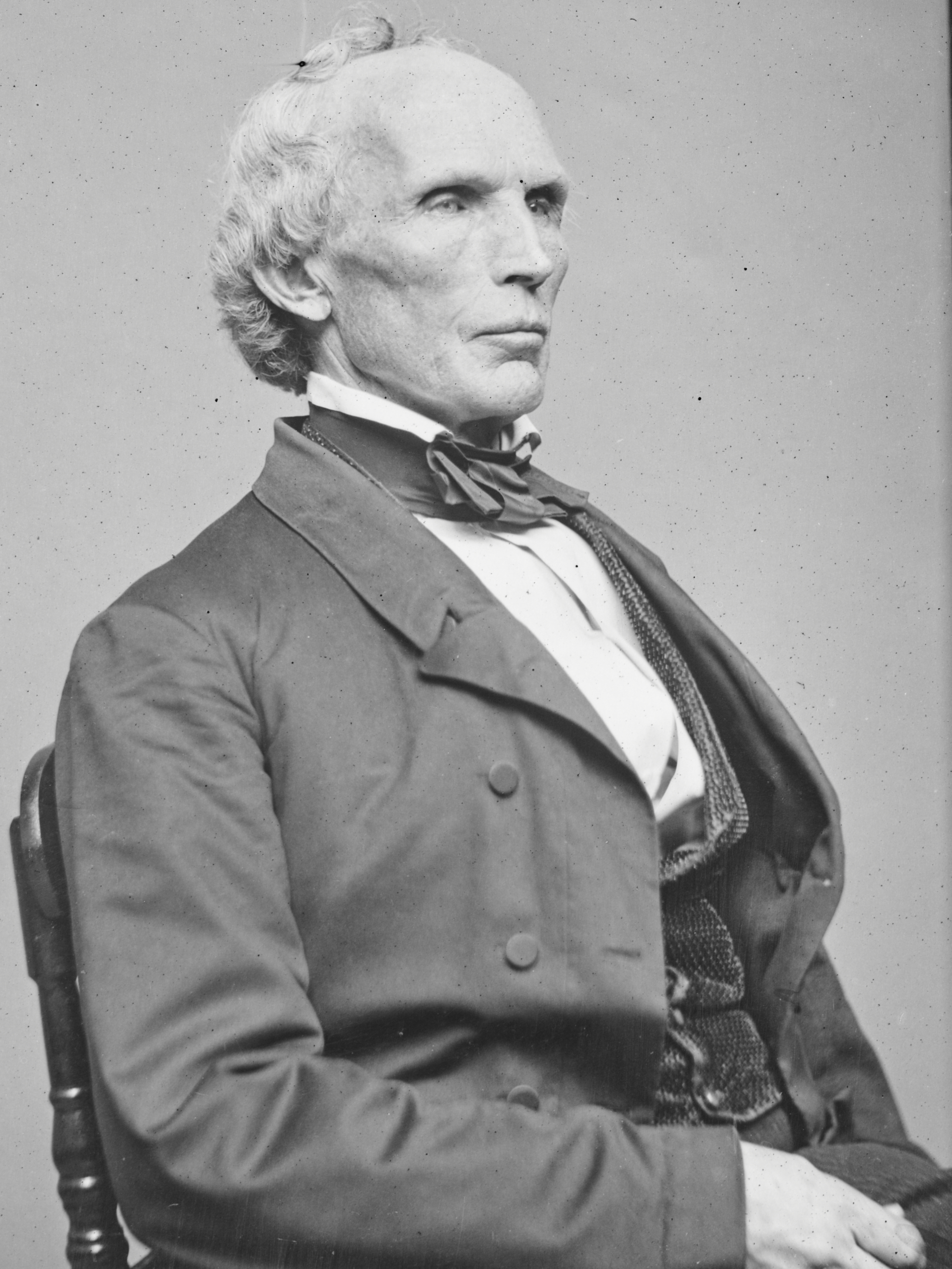

United States Senator from Kentucky
- In office December 10, 1861 – September 22, 1872
- Preceded by: John C. Breckinridge
- Succeeded by: Willis B. Machen

Member of the U.S. House of Representatives from Kentucky
- In office March 4, 1839 – March 3, 1847
- Preceded by: John Chambers (12th); James Sprigg (8th)
- Succeeded by: District eliminated (12th); Charles S. Morehead (8th)
- Constituency: 12th district (1839-43); 8th district (1843-47)

Member of the Kentucky House of Representatives
- In office 1833–1835

Personal details
- Born: September 10, 1801 Mount Sterling, Kentucky, US
- Died: September 22, 1872 (aged 71) Paris, Kentucky, US
- Resting place: Paris Cemetery, Paris, Kentucky
- Party: Whig; Union Democratic; Democrat
- Spouses: Rebecca Trimble (m. 1826; died 1844); Eliza Jane Morrow (m. 1845; died 1868)
- Profession: Politician, lawyer

Garrett Davis (September 10, 1801 – September 22, 1872) was an American attorney and politician who represented Kentucky in the United States House of Representatives from 1839 to 1847 and the United States Senate from 1861 to his death.

== Early life ==
Born in Mount Sterling, Kentucky, Garrett Davis was the brother of Amos Davis. After completing preparatory studies, Davis was employed in the office of the county clerk of Montgomery County, Kentucky, and afterward of Bourbon County, Kentucky. He studied law, and, after being admitted to the bar in 1823, pursued the private practice of law in Paris, Kentucky and eventually owned slaves.

== Political career ==
Davis served in the Kentucky House of Representatives from 1833 to 1835. Afterward, he was elected as a Whig to the United States House of Representatives, serving from March 4, 1839, to March 3, 1847. There he was chairman of the Committee on Territories.

Davis declined to be a candidate for reelection in 1846, but instead resumed the practice of law and also engaged in agricultural pursuits. He refused to reenter politics the next fifteen years. Davis declined the nomination for Lieutenant Governor of Kentucky in 1848 and declined the American Party nomination for Governor in 1855 and for the presidency in 1856.

Davis was opposed to secession and supported the Constitutional Union Party ticket of John Bell and Edward Everett in the 1860 presidential election. This convinced him to reenter politics, and he was elected to the U.S. Senate as a Union Democrat by the Kentucky General Assembly in a December 1861 special election to fill the vacancy caused by the expulsion of John C. Breckinridge for supporting the Confederacy. In this term, he was one of six senators to oppose the Thirteenth Amendment to the United States Constitution. He was reelected as a Democrat in 1867. At the time of his death he was chairman of the Committee on Private Land Claims (during the 42nd Congress).

== Personal life ==
Davis was married twice, first to Rebecca Trimble, the daughter of Associate Justice Robert Trimble, and then to Eliza J. Elliott. He was the father of four children: Rebecca, Robert, Carrie and Garrett.

== Death and legacy ==
Davis died in office on September 22, 1872. Davis' home, called Woodhome, was afterward sold to George Edgar who used it for a military academy.

Davis is the namesake of Davis County, Iowa.

== See also ==
- List of members of the United States Congress who died in office (1790–1899)

== Sources ==
- United States Congress. "Garrett Davis (id: D000099)". Biographical Directory of the United States Congress.
- American National Biography, Dictionary of American Biography, United States Congress.
- Memorial Addresses for Garrett Davis. 42nd Cong., 3rd sess. from 1872 to 1873. Washington, D.C.: Government Printing Office, 1873

U.S. House of Representatives
Preceded by John Chambers	Member of the U.S. House of Representatives from Kentucky's 12th congressional district 1839–1843 (obsolete district)	Succeeded by Seat lost to redistricting
Preceded by James Sprigg	Member of the U.S. House of Representatives from Kentucky's 8th congressional district 1843–1847	Succeeded by Charles Morehead
U.S. Senate
Preceded by John C. Breckinridge	U.S. senator (Class 3) from Kentucky; 1861–1872; Served alongside: Lazarus W. Powell, James Guthrie, Thomas C. McCreery, John W. Stevenson	Succeeded by Willis B. Machen
