= Apollo High School (Kentucky) =

Coordinates: 37.72717°N 87.14416°W

Location
- 2280 Tamarack Road; Owensboro, Kentucky 42301; United States

Information
- Type: Public
- Established: 1972
- School district: Daviess County Public Schools
- Principal: Mason Head
- Teaching staff: 80.00 (on an FTE basis)
- Grades: 9–12
- Enrollment: 1,350 (2023–24)
- Student to teacher ratio: 16.88
- Colors: Blue, white, and red
- Nickname: Eagles
- Website: www.daviesskyschools.org/o/ahs

Apollo High School is a high school that is part of the Daviess County Public Schools district, located in Owensboro, Kentucky, United States. It was named after the Apollo Space Program, and opened in 1969 as a junior high school. It then converted into a high school in 1972 and held its first graduation in 1974. The school paper is named The Challenger, after the Space Shuttle Challenger. This school also has a marching band program called the Apollo Marching Eagles.

Apollo has been involved in a 1-1 laptop project since August 2005, providing a laptop to every incoming freshman for their use during the school year.

== Notable alumni ==
- Rex Chapman, former NBA player
- Jeff Jones, college basketball coach
- Suzanne Miles, Kentucky Representative and House Majority Caucus Chair
- Marc Salyers, professional basketball player, played mostly in Europe
- Haley Strode, television and movie actress
- Michael Waltrip, former NASCAR driver
- Brad Wilkerson, former Major League Baseball player
