= Yellow Banks, Kentucky =

Unincorporated community in Kentucky, United States

Yellow Banks (Owensboro, Kentucky)
- Unincorporated community
- Location within Kentucky
- Coordinates: 37°45′28″N 87°7′6″W
- Country: United States
- State: Kentucky
- County: Daviess
- Elevation: 390 ft (120 m)
- Time zone: UTC-6 (Central (CST))
  - Summer (DST): UTC-5 (CDT)
- ZIP code: 42301, 42303, 42303
- Area code: 270
- GNIS feature ID: 497423

Yellow Banks, Kentucky, was the name of the rustic community founded by pioneer William Smeathers or Smothers around 1790 on the banks of the Ohio River. The name was derived from the yellowish banks along the river. In 1817, Yellow Banks became the established town of Owensborough, in honor of Col. Abraham Owen (also the namesake of Owen County in Kentucky).
