= Brescia University =

Catholic university in Owensboro, Kentucky, U.S.

- Former names: Mount Saint Joseph Junior College for Women (1925–1951); Brescia College (1951–1998)
- Type: Private college
- Established: 1925
- Accreditation: Southern Association of Colleges and Schools Commission on Colleges
- Affiliations: Catholic Church (Ursuline Sisters of Mount Saint Joseph)
- Religious affiliation: Roman Catholic
- Academic affiliations: ACCU, NAICU, CIC
- President: Madison C. Silvert
- Students: 638 (fall 2023)
- Undergraduates: 551 (fall 2023)
- Postgraduates: 87 (fall 2023)
- Location: Owensboro, Kentucky, United States; 37°46′8.22″N 87°6′43.47″W
- Colors: Blue & Gold
- Nickname: Bearcats
- Sporting affiliations: NAIA – River States
- Mascot: Bearcat
- Website: www.brescia.edu

Brescia University is a private Catholic college in Owensboro, Kentucky, United States. It was founded as a junior college for women and is now a coeducational institution, offering undergraduate and master's programs.

== History ==
Brescia University traces its roots to Mount Saint Joseph Junior College for Women, founded in 1925 by the Ursuline Sisters of Mount Saint Joseph at Maple Mount, a rural area outside Owensboro. Coeducational extension courses were started at Owensboro and eventually grew into its own campus. After World War II, the two campuses were consolidated, thus, becoming fully co-educational. In 1951, it was renamed Brescia College, after the Italian city of Brescia, where Saint Angela Merici founded the original order. It changed its name, in 1998, to become Brescia University, with the addition of Master's degree programs in Management and Curriculum and Instruction.

== Athletics ==
The Brescia athletic teams are called the Bearcats. The institution is a member of the National Association of Intercollegiate Athletics (NAIA), primarily competing in the River States Conference (RSC), since the 1984–85 academic year.

Brescia competes in 18 intercollegiate varsity sports: Men's sports include baseball, basketball, cross country, golf, soccer, tennis and track and field, while women's sports include basketball, cross country, golf, soccer, softball, tennis, track and field and volleyball. Cheer is offered as a co-ed sport.

== Notable alumni ==
- Joey Goebel, author
- Chris Holtmann, college basketball coach (did not graduate; transferred to Taylor University)
