= Daviess County Public Schools =

Education organization in Owensboro, United States

Daviess County Public Schools is a school district that manages the public schools in Daviess County, Kentucky, USA. However, within the city limits, Owensboro Public Schools is an independent district from the county schools.

== Apollo High School ==
Apollo High School is a high school located in Owensboro, Kentucky. Named after the Apollo Space Program, Apollo opened in 1969 as a junior high school. Apollo converted to a high school in 1972. There are about 1,400 students. Their mascot is the eagle with the school colors of blue and white. The current principal is Mason Head.

== Daviess County High School ==
Daviess County High School is a high school in Owensboro. It is one of the largest schools in the area with roughly 1750 students. Their mascot is the Panther with the school colors of red and white. The current principal is Jeff Wethington.

== Heritage Park High School ==
After Beacon Central was closed, this school opened in 2015. From 2015 to 2020, Heritage Park housed sophomores, juniors and seniors. Beginning with the 2020–2021 school year, Heritage Park added a freshman class. The school specializes in innovative teaching and learning, along with credit recovery for upperclassmen. It has a student population of approximately 150.

== Burns Middle School ==
Burns Middle School holds grades 6–8 in Owensboro,Kentucky. The mascot is the Fox and the colors are blue and white. Its current principal is Kendra Bronsink. The building was constructed in 1971. Burns presents many opportunities for students such as an Academic Team, a basketball team, a volleyball team, and other opportunities provided by Apollo High School like tennis.

== College View Middle School ==
College View Middle School enrolls students grades 6–8 in Owensboro. The school is named "College View", because it is across the street of Owensboro Community and Technical College. The nickname is the Vikings and colors are purple and white. The middle school feeds into both Apollo High School and Daviess County High School. The schools color of purple is a result of this combining the blue of Apollo High School and the red of Daviess County High School. Its principal is Brandon Brooks.

== Daviess County Middle School ==
Daviess County Middle School holds grades 6–8 in Owensboro. The mascot is the Panther and colors are red and white.
