= Owensboro, Kentucky =

- City
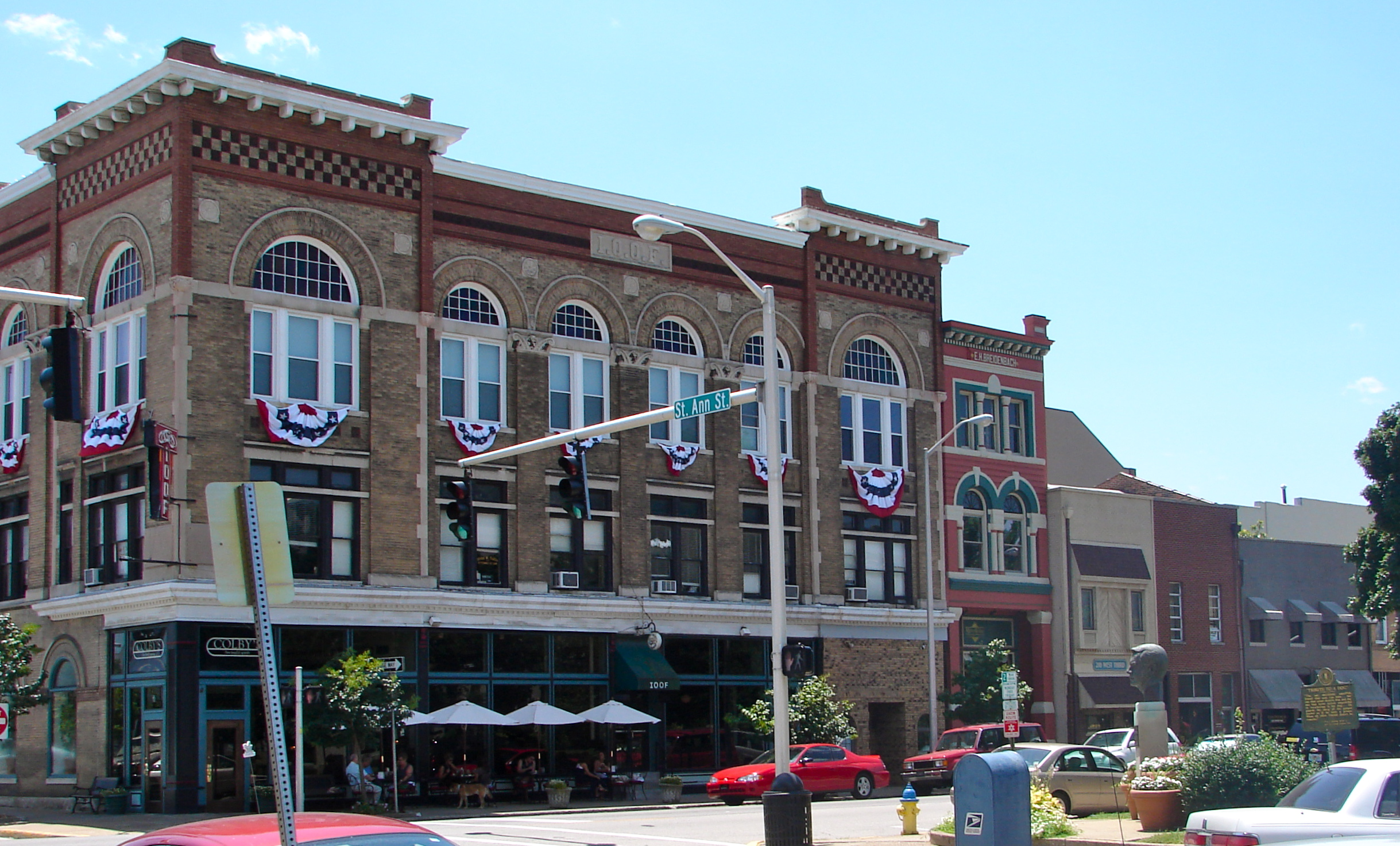
- Corner of West 3rd and St. Ann Streets in Owensboro

- Flag Seal
- Nickname: BBQ Capital of the World
- Motto: "Progress 1817"
- Interactive map of Owensboro, Kentucky
- Location within Kentucky Location within the United States
- Coordinates: 37°45′28″N 87°7′6″W
- Country: United States
- State: Kentucky
- County: Daviess
- Settled: 1797 (as Yellow Banks)
- Established: 1817 (as Owensborough)
- Incorporated: 1850

Government
  - Mayor: Tom Watson
  - City manager: Nate Pagan

Area
  - City: 22.10 sq mi (57.24 km^{2})
  - Land: 20.65 sq mi (53.49 km^{2})
  - Water: 1.45 sq mi (3.76 km^{2}) 6.47%
- Elevation: 390 ft (120 m)

Population (2020)
  - City: 60,183
  - Estimate (2022): 60,037
  - Density: 2,914.2/sq mi (1,125.16/km^{2})
  - Metro: 116,506
- Time zone: UTC−6 (CST)
  - Summer (DST): UTC−5 (CDT)
- ZIP codes: 42301-42304
- Area codes: 270 & 364
- FIPS code: 21-58620
- GNIS feature ID: 0500082
- Website: owensboro.org

Owensboro is a city in Daviess County, Kentucky, United States, of which it is also the county seat. It is the fourth-most populous city in the state. Owensboro is located on U.S. Route 60 and Interstate 165 about 107 miles (172 km) southwest of Louisville, and is the principal city of the Owensboro metropolitan area. The 2020 census had its population at 60,183. The metropolitan population was estimated at 116,506. The metropolitan area is the sixth largest in the state as of 2018, and the seventh largest population center in the state when including micropolitan areas.

== History ==
Evidence of Native American settlement in the area dates back 12,000 years. Following a series of failed uprisings with British support, however, the last Shawnee were forced to vacate the area before the end of the 18th century.

The first European descendant to settle in Owensboro was frontiersman William Smeathers or Smothers in 1797, for whom the riverfront park is named. The settlement was originally known as "Yellow Banks" from the color of the land beside the Ohio River. In 1817, Yellow Banks was formally established under the name Owensborough, named after Col. Abraham Owen. In 1893, the spelling of the name was shortened to its current Owensboro.

Several distillers, mainly of bourbon whiskey, have been in and around the city of Owensboro. The major distillery still in operation is the Glenmore Distillery Company, now owned by the Sazerac Company. The other distillery, Green River Distilling Company, started in 1885 and is also Owensboro based. It is still in operation today.

On August 14, 1936, downtown Owensboro was the site of the last public hanging in the United States. A 26 year old African American man, Rainey Bethea, was convicted and sentenced for the rape and murder of 70-year-old Lischa Edwards. The public execution, attended by a large crowd including children and many reporters, took place 37 days after the crime. The execution was presided over by a female sheriff, Florence Shoemaker Thompson, who gained national media attention for her role in the process, although she declined to spring the trap. Vendors sold hot dogs, and the crowd began tearing at his clothes and body for souvenirs, even before he was pronounced dead. The Kentucky General Assembly abolished public executions after the incident.

=== Manufacturing ===
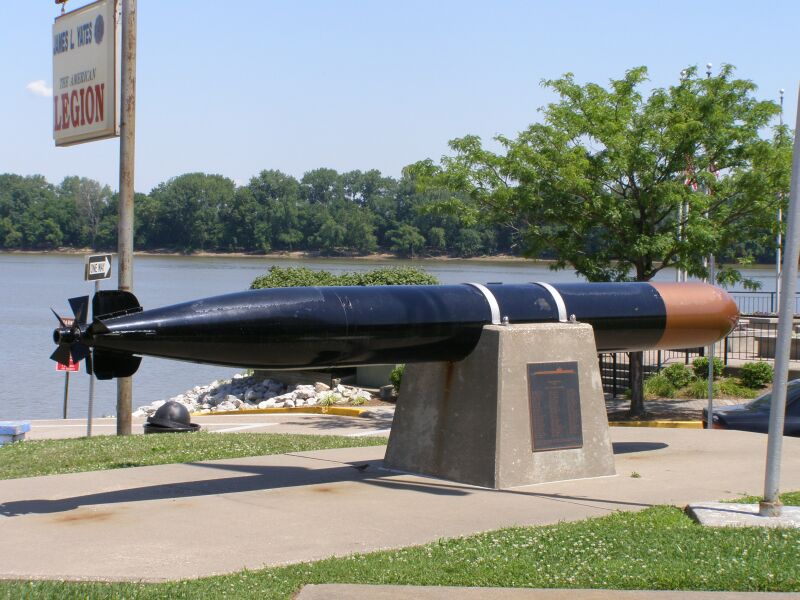
Dudley Morton Memorial at the American Legion Hall

As of 1903, Owensboro was home to several stemmeries. Pinkerton Tobacco produced Red Man (now America's Best Chew) chewing tobacco in Owensboro. Swedish Match continues to make America's Best Chew in a plant outside city limits.

The Owensboro Wagon Company, established in 1884, was one of the largest and most influential wagon companies in the nation. With eight styles or sizes of wagons, the company set the standard of quality at the turn of the 20th century.

Frederick A. Ames came to Owensboro from Washington, Pennsylvania, in 1887. He started the Carriage Woodstock Company to repair horse-drawn carriages. In 1910, he began to manufacture a line of automobiles under the Ames brand name. Ames hired industrialist Vincent Bendix in 1912, and the company became the Ames Motor Car Company. Despite its product being called the "best $1500" car by a Texas car dealer, the company ceased production of its own model in 1915. The company then began manufacturing replacement bodies for the more widely sold Ford Model T. In 1922, the company remade itself and started to manufacture furniture under the name Ames Corporation. The company finally sold out to Whitehall Furniture in 1970.

The start of the Kentucky Electrical Lamp Company, a light bulb manufacturing company was in 1899; it eventually was acquired by Kentucky Radio Company (Ken-Rad) in 1918 and later acquired by General Electric in 1945 and in 1987 acquired by MPD, Inc., created the light bulbs that illuminated the first night game in the history of Major League Baseball on May 24, 1935, between the Reds and Phillies at Cincinnati's Crosley Field. The Owensboro plant was a major part of General Electric's vacuum tube manufacturing operations, producing both receiving types and military/industrial ceramic types. In 1961, engineers at the General Electric plant in Owensboro introduced a family of vacuum tubes called the Compactron.

In June 1932, John G. Barnard founded the Modern Welding Company in a small building located near the Ohio River at First and Frederica Streets where the Bluegrass Music Hall of Fame and Museum is located. Today, Modern Welding Company has nine steel tank and vessel fabrication subsidiaries located throughout the United States, and five welding supply stores located in Kentucky and Indiana. The company is the country's largest supplier of underground and above ground steel storage tanks for flammable and combustible liquids. The company celebrated its 75th anniversary in 2007.

Texas Gas Transmission Corporation was created in 1948 with the merger of Memphis Natural Gas Company and Kentucky Natural Gas Corporation and made its headquarters in Owensboro. Since that time, Texas Gas changed ownership four times. The company was bought by CSX Corp. in 1983, by Transco Energy Corp. in 1989, by Williams in 1995, and by Loews Corporation in 2003.

== Geography ==
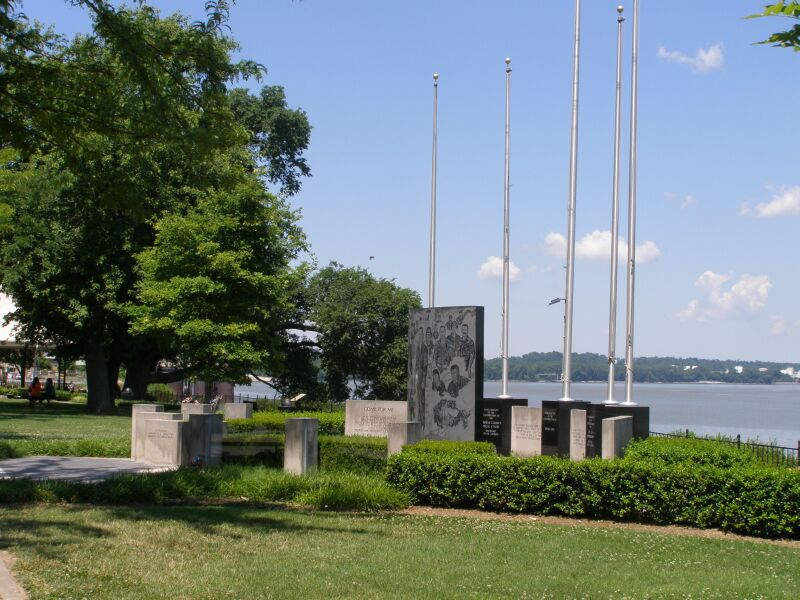
Military memorial on the riverfront

Owensboro is located at the crook of a bend in the Ohio River, 37 miles (60 km) southeast of Evansville, Indiana.

According to the United States Census Bureau, Owensboro has a total area of 20.4 square miles (52.9 km^{2}), of which 19.1 square miles (49.5 km^{2}) is land and 1.3 square miles (3.4 km^{2}), or 6.47%, is water.

=== Climate ===
Owensboro has a humid subtropical climate which is characterized by hot, humid summers and moderately cold winters. Day-to-day temperature differences can be high during the winter. Summers, in comparison, are much more stable. Severe weather, including the threat of tornadoes, is not uncommon throughout much of the year, with several notable events occurring throughout the city's history. One such event occurred on December 9, 1952, when F3 tornado tore directly through the city, injuring three people.

Climate data for Owensboro, Kentucky (1981–2010 normals, extremes 1896–present)
Month	Jan	Feb	Mar	Apr	May	Jun	Jul	Aug	Sep	Oct	Nov	Dec	Year
Record high °F (°C)	76 (24)	80 (27)	89 (32)	92 (33)	96 (36)	107 (42)	107 (42)	105 (41)	104 (40)	95 (35)	87 (31)	76 (24)	107 (42)
Mean daily maximum °F (°C)	45.7 (7.6)	50.5 (10.3)	60.0 (15.6)	71.9 (22.2)	80.1 (26.7)	88.5 (31.4)	92.0 (33.3)	91.5 (33.1)	85.6 (29.8)	74.6 (23.7)	60.9 (16.1)	49.2 (9.6)	70.9 (21.6)
Daily mean °F (°C)	36.0 (2.2)	40.1 (4.5)	48.6 (9.2)	59.3 (15.2)	68.2 (20.1)	76.7 (24.8)	80.3 (26.8)	79.0 (26.1)	72.1 (22.3)	60.7 (15.9)	49.5 (9.7)	38.9 (3.8)	59.1 (15.1)
Mean daily minimum °F (°C)	26.2 (−3.2)	29.7 (−1.3)	37.2 (2.9)	46.8 (8.2)	56.3 (13.5)	64.8 (18.2)	68.6 (20.3)	66.5 (19.2)	58.5 (14.7)	46.7 (8.2)	38.2 (3.4)	28.6 (−1.9)	47.3 (8.5)
Record low °F (°C)	−23 (−31)	−21 (−29)	−7 (−22)	22 (−6)	31 (−1)	38 (3)	44 (7)	42 (6)	27 (−3)	17 (−8)	−7 (−22)	−16 (−27)	−23 (−31)
Average precipitation inches (mm)	3.41 (87)	4.11 (104)	4.64 (118)	4.51 (115)	5.84 (148)	3.01 (76)	3.76 (96)	3.31 (84)	3.46 (88)	3.46 (88)	4.06 (103)	4.21 (107)	47.78 (1,214)
Average snowfall inches (cm)	2.4 (6.1)	4.0 (10)	0.6 (1.5)	0.2 (0.51)	0.0 (0.0)	0.0 (0.0)	0.0 (0.0)	0.0 (0.0)	0.0 (0.0)	0.2 (0.51)	0.0 (0.0)	1.4 (3.6)	8.8 (22)
Average precipitation days (≥ 0.01 in)	8.4	9.5	10.7	9.8	11.0	8.6	7.9	6.9	7.6	7.9	9.4	9.9	107.6
Average snowy days (≥ 0.1 in)	1.1	1.1	0.4	0.1	0.0	0.0	0.0	0.0	0.0	0.1	0.0	0.7	3.5
Source: NOAA

== Demographics ==
Historical population
Census	Pop.	Note	%±
1830	229		—
1850	1,215		—
1860	2,308		90.0%
1870	3,437		48.9%
1880	6,231		81.3%
1890	9,837		57.9%
1900	13,189		34.1%
1910	16,011		21.4%
1920	17,424		8.8%
1930	22,765		30.7%
1940	30,245		32.9%
1950	33,651		11.3%
1960	42,471		26.2%
1970	50,329		18.5%
1980	54,450		8.2%
1990	53,549		−1.7%
2000	54,067		1.0%
2010	57,265		5.9%
2020	60,183		5.1%
2025 (est.)	60,892		1.2%
U.S. Decennial Census

=== 2020 census ===
As of the 2020 census, Owensboro had a population of 60,183. The median age was 38.1 years. 23.7% of residents were under the age of 18 and 18.3% of residents were 65 years of age or older. For every 100 females there were 91.5 males, and for every 100 females age 18 and over there were 87.5 males age 18 and over.

99.9% of residents lived in urban areas, while 0.1% lived in rural areas.

There were 25,105 households in Owensboro, of which 29.0% had children under the age of 18 living in them. Of all households, 37.4% were married-couple households, 20.5% were households with a male householder and no spouse or partner present, and 34.3% were households with a female householder and no spouse or partner present. About 34.9% of all households were made up of individuals and 14.9% had someone living alone who was 65 years of age or older.

There were 26,918 housing units, of which 6.7% were vacant. The homeowner vacancy rate was 1.9% and the rental vacancy rate was 6.9%.

Racial composition as of the 2020 census
Race	Number	Percent
White	48,585	80.7%
Black or African American	4,254	7.1%
American Indian and Alaska Native	166	0.3%
Asian	2,128	3.5%
Native Hawaiian and Other Pacific Islander	51	0.1%
Some other race	1,376	2.3%
Two or more races	3,623	6.0%
Hispanic or Latino (of any race)	2,867	4.8%

=== 2010 census ===
As of the census of 2010, there were 58,083 people and 23,380 households within the city. The population density was 2,999.1 people per square mile (1,158.0 people/km^{2}). There were 26,072 housing units at an average density of 1,394.7 per square mile (538.5/km^{2}). The racial makeup of the city was 87.5% White, 7.3% African American, 0.9% Asian, 0.1% Native American, 0.01% Pacific Islander, 0.55% from other races, and 2.5% from two or more races. Hispanic or Latino of any race were 3.2% of the population.

There were 23,380 households, out of which 23.7% had children under the age of 18 living with them, 44.7% were married couples living together, 13.9% had a female householder with no husband present, and 37.8% were non-families. 33.3% of all households were made up of individuals, and 14.0% had someone living alone who was 65 years of age or older. The average household size was 2.29 and the average family size was 2.91.

In the city, the population was spread out, with 23.7% under the age of 18, 9.8% from 18 to 24, 27.4% from 25 to 44, 22.4% from 45 to 64, and 16.3% who were 65 years of age or older. The median age was 37 years. For every 100 females, there were 87.6 males. For every 100 females age 18 and over, there were 82.6 males.

The median income for a household in the city was $37,289, and the median income for a family was $41,333. Males had a median income of $33,429 versus $21,457 for females. The per capita income for the city was $21,183. About 12.2% of families and 18.4% of the population were below the poverty line, including 20.9% of those under age 18 and 12.4% of those age 65 or over.

=== Metropolitan area ===
According to the 2007 census, the Owensboro Metropolitan Area includes Daviess, Hancock, and McLean counties.

== Economy ==
=== Top employers ===
According to Owensboro's 2023 Annual Comprehensive Financial Report, the top employers in the city were:

#	Employer	# of Employees
1	Owensboro Health	4,862
2	U.S. Bank Home Mortgage	1,475
3	Owensboro Public Schools	869
4	Toyotetsu Mid-America	850
5	Specialty Foods Group	642
6	Total Packaging LLC	480
7	UniFirst	434
7	City of Owensboro	434
9	Sazerac Distilleries	424
10	Mizkan America Inc.	391

=== Economic activity ===
In August 2024, Swedish Match announced it will expand its presence in Owensboro creating 450 direct jobs, with a $232 million investment, producing Swedish Match ZYN nicotine pouches, and moving toward a smoke-free future.

In March 2025, Mizkan America announced a $156 million expansion of its food-manufacturing complex, creating 44 jobs. The project adds approximately 320,000 square feet, which will bring the company's operational space to nearly 1 million square feet.

In July 2026, the City of Owensboro approved the development of the 121-acre Massie Site, intended to create another major industrial site for future corporate development.

In September 2026, Toyotetsu Mid America, announced a $41 million expansion and modernization of its automotive-parts operation, and will retain nearly 640 full-time jobs.

== Arts and culture ==
Owensboro was named an All-America City in 2013. Owensboro placed fourth on Area Development's Top 20 Southern Cities, with a 9th-place ranking for its "recession busting factors" among the Top 25 Small Cities.

=== Religion ===
Owensboro and Daviess County are served by many churches. According to statistics from U.S. Religion Census data from 2020, collected by The Association of Religion Data Archives, approximately 63.9% of the county population is affiliated with a religious organization. Evangelical Protestants make up the largest contingent at 35.1%, with Southern Baptists being the largest single denomination in the county in terms of both number of congregations and adherents. Catholics are the second-largest single denomination in number of adherents, representing 22.1%.

The following is a breakdown of measurably significant 2020 statistics:

Evangelical Protestant	35.1
Catholic	22.1
Mainline Protestant	5.3
Latter Day Saints	0.5
Jehovah's Witnesses	0.3
Black Protestant	0.3
Islam	0.2
Other Christians	0.1

Owensboro and Daviess County are home to several historic churches. Bethlehem Methodist Church on the east side of the county was organized in 1806, making it the oldest in the county. Nearby Yelvington Baptist Church dates back to 1813, making it the second oldest church in the county. Bethabara Baptist in Philpot dates back to 1825, while Pleasant Grove Baptist in Sorgho traces its origins back to 1835. First Baptist Church in Owensboro also dates back to 1835, as does Fourth Street Baptist Church.

St. Lawrence Parish in eastern Daviess County dates to 1822, making it the oldest Catholic parish in the county. St. Stephen Parish dates to 1839, and is the oldest parish in Owensboro. In 1937, Pope Pius XI established the Roman Catholic Diocese of Owensboro, which spans approximately the western third of the state. It includes 32 counties and covers approximately 12,500 square miles (32,000 km^{2}).

The Daviess-McLean Baptist Association, dating back to 1844, is the regional hub for 50+ Southern Baptist churches in Daviess, McLean, and northern Ohio County.

Owensboro is also home to Temple Adath Israel. Organized in 1858 and built in 1877, it is among the oldest Jewish synagogues in the United States.

Owensboro is also the location of the Covenant Baptist Theological Seminary.

=== Music ===
Owensboro is home to the Bluegrass Music Hall of Fame and Museum (previously known as the International Bluegrass Music Museum). The museum is dedicated to the history and preservation of Bluegrass music, as well as hosting the Bluegrass Hall of Fame to celebrate the best of Bluegrass musicians. The venue also hosts many music events throughout the year.

The Bluegrass Music Hall of Fame and Museum won the Governor's Award for Community Arts in 2013

=== Events ===
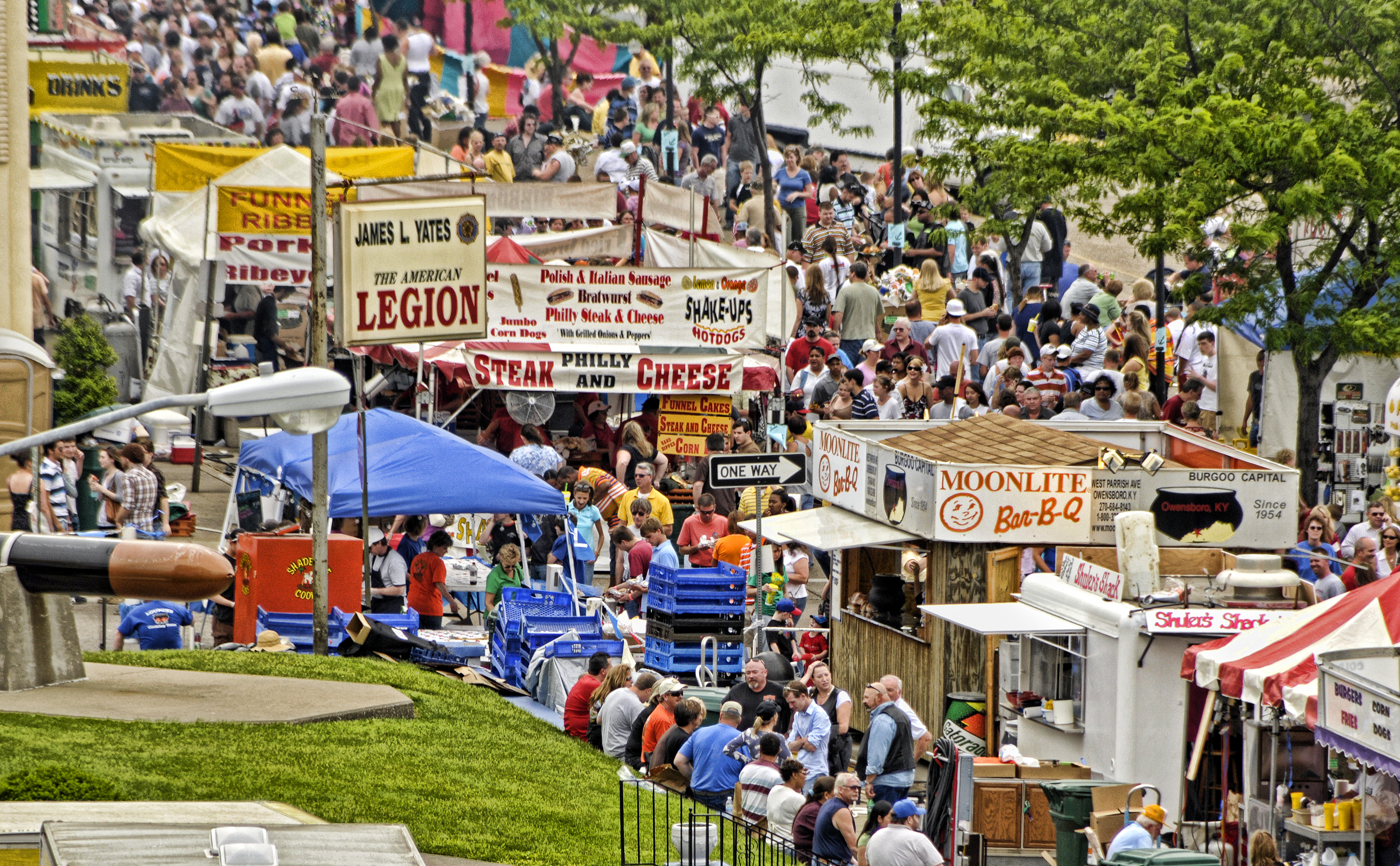
Owensboro BBQ Festival, 2008

- Owensboro is the "Barbecue Capital of the world"; it holds its International Bar-B-Q Festival and competition every second weekend in May.
- Owensboro hosts "ROMP", "River of Music Party", a bluegrass music festival. ROMP has grown to 25,000 visitors a year.
- Lanham Brothers Jamboree is an event held every second Saturday from April through September at the Diamond Lake Resort Theater in Owensboro.
- During the summer, the city offers "Friday After 5", a free 16-week series of outdoor concerts on the downtown riverfront, which resumed after a pandemic break.
- The "Owensboro PumpkinFest" is held each September at the Sportscenter/Moreland Park complex. The festival includes food vendors, crafts people, carnival rides, children and adult activities and games, and contests using pumpkins. The event was started by the Glenmary Sisters to raise awareness and funds.
- Owensboro Multicultural Festival is held each year to celebrate diversity.

=== Points of interest ===
- Ben Hawes Golf Course and Park
- Daviess County Public Library
- Owensboro Bridge
- International Bluegrass Music Museum
- Largest sassafras tree (located on Frederica Street next door to the Daviess County Public Library)
- Owensboro Museum of Science and History
- RiverPark Center
- Smothers Park
- Temple Adath Israel, one of the oldest synagogue buildings still standing in the United States
- Western Kentucky Botanical Garden
- William H. Natcher Bridge

== Sports ==
The Owensboro Oilers baseball team compete in the collegiate wood-bat Ohio Valley League. The Oilers were the KIT League's 2008 playoff champions and the 2006 KIT League season champions. The team is named for the baseball minor league farm team "Owensboro Oilers" which existed in the 1940s. Many of the city high schools produced talented college and professional athletes.

== Government ==
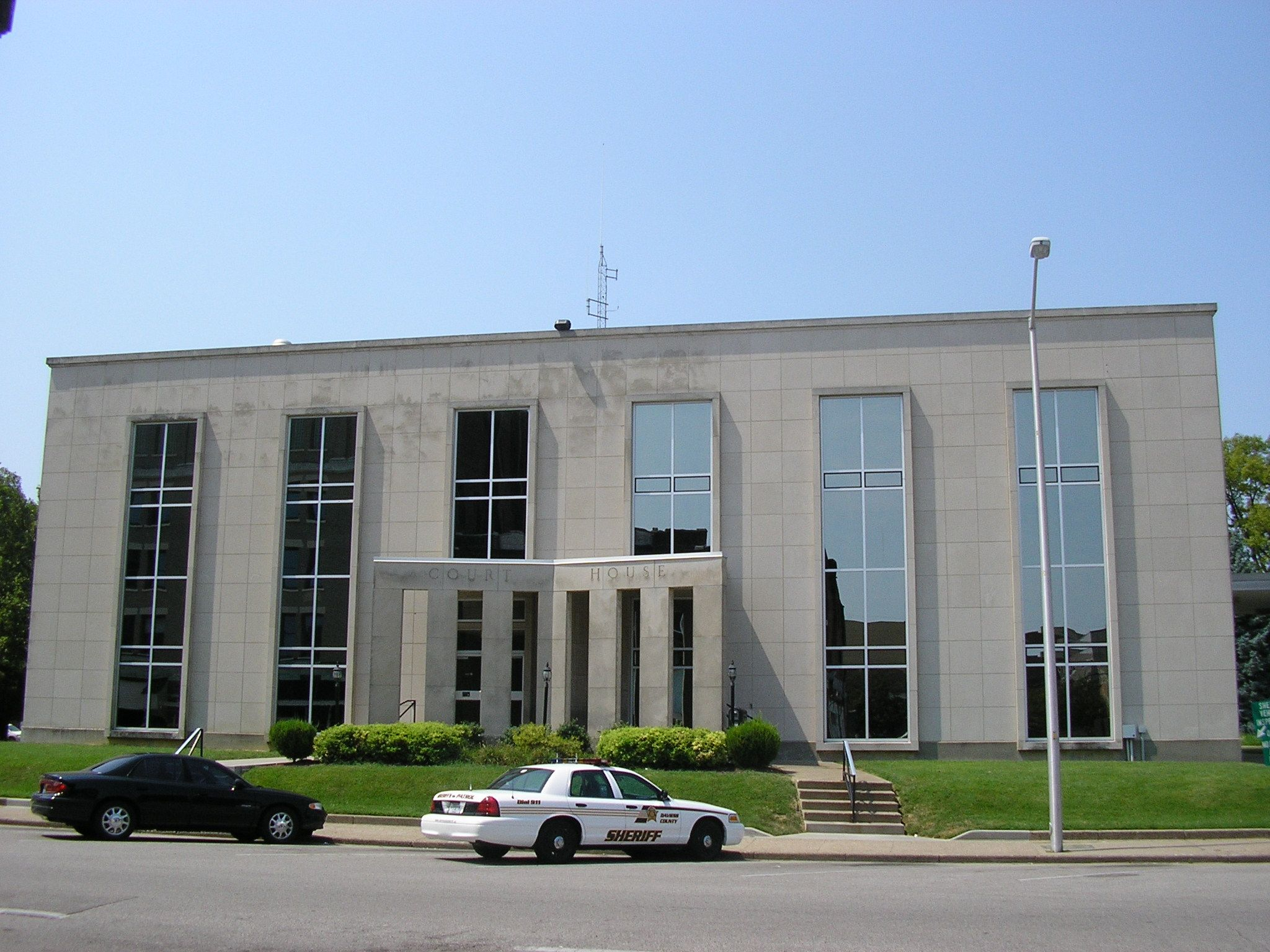
Daviess County Courthouse constructed in 1964

Owensboro is a home-rule class city, and has operated under a City Manager form of government since 1954. Citizens elect a mayor and four city commissioners who form the Board of Commissioners. The Board of Commissioners is the legislative body of the city government and represents the interests of the citizens. The Board of Commissioners hires a city manager who administers the day-to-day operations of the city.

The mayor is elected for a term of four years. Each city commissioner is elected for a term of two years. The term of the city manager is indefinite and based on performance.

== Education ==
The Owensboro Public Schools, Daviess County Public Schools, and the Diocese of Owensboro's Catholic School System oversee K–12 education in and around Owensboro.

Owensboro is home to two private, four-year colleges, Brescia University (Catholic) and Kentucky Wesleyan College, and one public community college, Owensboro Community and Technical College. A campus of Daymar College is also located in Owensboro, and Western Kentucky University has a regional campus there.

In 2006, plans were announced for a research center operated by the University of Louisville to be located at the Mitchell Memorial Cancer Center, a part of the Owensboro Medical Health System, to study how to make the first ever human papilloma virus vaccine, called Gardasil, from tobacco plants. U of L researcher Dr Albert Bennet Jenson and Dr Shin-je Ghim discovered the vaccine in 2006. If successful, the vaccine would be made in Owensboro.

Owensboro has a lending library, the Daviess County Public Library.

== Media ==
=== Print and online ===
The daily newspaper is the Messenger-Inquirer, owned by Paxton Media Group of Paducah, Kentucky.

The Owensboro Times is a local news website.

=== Radio ===
Radio stations include WBIO, WXCM, WLME, WOMI, WVJS and WBKR broadcasting from Owensboro. One, WSTO-FM, is actually licensed to Owensboro, although its studios are now located in Evansville.

=== Television ===
Although no television stations are based in the city, it is part of the Evansville television market, which is the 100th-largest in the United States, according to Nielsen Media Research. However, in early 2007, NBC affiliate WFIE-TV opened a bureau in Owensboro which covers news on the Kentucky side of the market. Many of the local television stations often promote themselves as serving Evansville, Indiana, Owensboro, Kentucky, and Henderson, Kentucky.

== Infrastructure ==
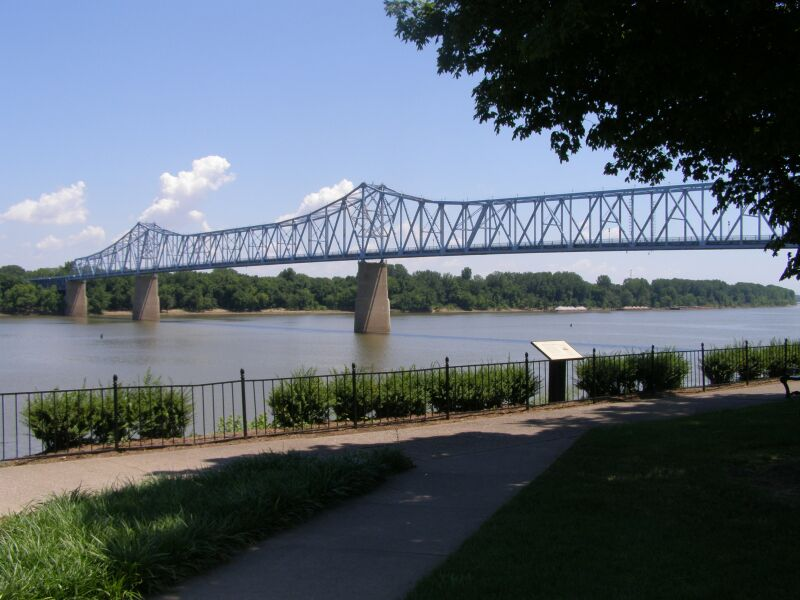
Owensboro Bridge and the Indiana riverbank as seen from Smothers Park in downtown Owensboro

=== Transportation ===
I-165, US 60, and US 431 serve Owensboro, with US 431 terminating at the former US 60 Bypass (now signed US 60). US 231 and US 60 form a partial beltway around Owensboro. KY 81, KY 56, KY 331, KY 298, KY 54, and KY 144 also serve the city.

Owensboro-Daviess County Regional Airport serves, along with Evansville Regional Airport, as one of the region's primary commercial airports.

The Owensboro Transit System (OTS) offers bus transit to residents, and the Green River Intra-County Transit System (GRITS) offers specialized bus services to residents with disabilities who are not able to ride fixed-route public transportation buses.

== Notable people ==
=== Politicians ===
- W. Ralph Basham, former director of the United States Secret Service
- Wendell H. Ford, former Kentucky governor and U.S. senator
- Steve Henry, former lieutenant governor of Kentucky
- Albert S. Marks, former governor of Tennessee
- Suzanne Miles, member of the Kentucky House of Representatives from the 7th District
- Wilbur Kingsbury Miller, federal judge
- William Rosenbaum, member of the Arizona House of Representatives
- John M. Spalding, World War II hero, politician

=== Sports ===
- Chris Brown (defensive back), former NFL player
- Bruce Brubaker, former Major League Baseball player
- Vince Buck, former NFL player
- Rex Chapman, former NBA player
- Wayne Chapman, former NBA and ABA player
- David Green, Jeff Green and Mark Green, NASCAR drivers
- Cliff Hagan, former NBA player
- Nicky Hayden, motorcycle racer, 2006 MotoGP champion
- Roger Lee Hayden, motorcycle racer
- Tommy Hayden, motorcycle racer
- Kenny Higgs, former NBA player
- Mark Higgs, former NFL player
- Jeff Jones, collegiate basketball coach
- Tommy Kron, professional basketball player
- Thanh Le, mixed martial arts
- Jeremy Mayfield, former NASCAR driver
- Justin Miller, NFL player
- Eugene Oberst, Olympic bronze medalist in the javelin throw
- Bo Smith, Canadian Football League cornerback
- Lucas Stauffer, soccer player
- Larry Vanover, MLB umpire
- Nick Varner, pool champion
- Darrell Waltrip, three-time NASCAR champion and Hall of Fame inductee; FOX sports commentator
- Michael Waltrip, retired NASCAR driver/team owner and FOX sports commentator
- Dave Watkins, Major League Baseball player
- Bobby Watson, former NBA player
- B. J. Whitmer, professional wrestler
- Brad Wilkerson, MLB player
- Ken Willis, former NFL player

=== Entertainers ===
- Monica Beverly Hillz, drag queen
- Johnny Depp, actor, director, musician
- Tom Ewell, actor
- Florence Henderson, actress, singer, most notable of The Brady Bunch fame
- Kevin Olusola, musician, beatboxer for Pentatonix
- Tom Powers, actor
- Christine Johnson Smith, opera singer and Tony Award-nominated Broadway actress
- Mark Stuart, vocalist for Audio Adrenaline
- William Booth Wecker, showman of the 1930s and 1940s

=== Authors and journalists ===
- Terry Bisson, author
- Kody Keplinger, author
- Stephen F. Cohen, Russian studies scholar
- Craig Crawford, political commentator
- Jesse Edward Grinstead author of Western fiction
- Marcus Rediker, historian and activist
- Moneta Sleet, Jr., Pulitzer Prize-winning photographer

=== Others ===
- Beulah Annan, suspected murderer
- Rainey Bethea, the last person to be publicly executed in Kentucky
- Thomas Cruse, U.S. Army brigadier general who was a recipient of the Medal of Honor
- Hazen A. Dean, noted Boy Scouts of America member and Scoutmaster
- Hadley Duvall, reproductive freedom advocate
- Lawrence W. Hager, publisher and owner of the Messenger-Inquirer
- Dudley W. Morton, U.S. naval commander
- David Sharpe, American painter

== Sister cities ==
Owensboro has two sister cities, as designated by Sister Cities International:

- Olomouc, Moravia, Czech Republic
- Nisshin, Aichi, Japan

== See also ==
- List of cities and towns along the Ohio River
- Union Station (Owensboro, Kentucky)
