= 2010 Louisville mayoral election =

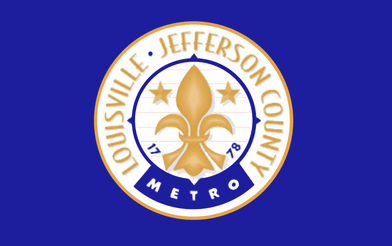
- November 2, 2010
- Turnout: 258,401
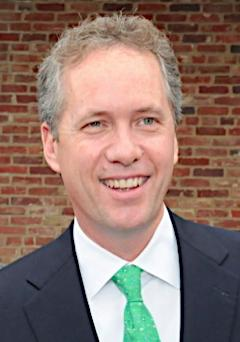

Nominee	Greg Fischer	Hal Heiner
Party	Democratic	Republican
Popular vote	132,050	125,178
Percentage	51.1%	48.4%

The 2010 mayoral election in Louisville Metro took place on November 2, 2010, alongside other federal, state and local elections.

Incumbent Mayor Jerry Abramson was re-elected with 67% of the vote in 2006, after being elected to his first term with 74% of the vote in 2002. He announced his intention not to run for a third consecutive term, and instead run for lieutenant governor of Kentucky in 2011, with Governor Steve Beshear as his running mate.

Primaries for each respective party were held on May 18, 2010, with Greg Fischer receiving the Democratic nomination and Hal Heiner receiving the Republican nomination. On November 2, Greg Fischer was elected mayor of Louisville in a tight race.

== Mayor Abramson stepping down ==
After three consecutive terms as mayor of the city of Louisville from 1985 to 1999, followed by two consecutive terms as the mayor of Louisville Metro from 2003 to 2011, Mayor Jerry Abramson stepped down to run for lieutenant governor of Kentucky in 2011.

== Democratic primary ==
=== Candidates ===
Filed

- Tyler Allen, businessman and co-founder of 8664.org
- Burrel Charles Farnsley, son of former Mayor Charles R. Farnsley
- Greg Fischer, businessman and 2008 primary candidate for the U.S. Senate in Kentucky
- Jim King, banker, and member and former President of the Louisville Metro Council (2008–2009)
- Connie Marshall, community activist
- Lisa Moxley, former Communications Director for Barack Obama's 2008 Presidential campaign in Kentucky
- David Tandy, attorney and former Louisville Metro Council President (2009–2010)
- Shannon White, founder of the Kentucky chapter of Dress for Success, and finance director for 3rd District Congressman John Yarmuth

=== Polling ===
Poll Source	Date(s) administered	Sample size	Margin of Error	Tyler Allen	Burrel Farnsley	Greg Fischer	Jim King	Connie Marshall	Lisa Moxley	David Tandy	Shannon White	Unde- cided
Survey USA (report)	May 10–12, 2010	735	± 3.7%	7%	2%	42%	21%	2%	1%	13%	2%	11%
Survey USA (report)	April 9–12, 2010	672	± 3.9%	7%	2%	31%	13%	2%	2%	16%	4%	23%
Survey USA (report)	March 8–11, 2010	656	± 3.9%	8%	4%	20%	12%	2%	3%	17%	2%	32%

=== Primary results ===
Democratic primary results
Party	Candidate	Votes	%
Democratic	Greg Fischer	37,407	45.16
Democratic	David Tandy	16,610	20.05
Democratic	Jim King	15,927	19.23
Democratic	Tyler Allen	7,851	9.48
Democratic	Shannon White	1,785	2.15
Democratic	Lisa Moxley	1,123	1.36
Democratic	Connie Marshall	1,088	1.31
Democratic	Burrel Farnsley	1,047	1.26
Total votes		82,838	100.00

== Republican primary ==
=== Candidates ===
Filed

- Hal Heiner, businessman and member of the Louisville Metro Council
- Jonathan Robertson, small business owner
- Chris Thieneman, businessman and 2008 primary candidate for the U.S. House of Representatives in Kentucky's 3rd District

=== Polling ===
Poll Source	Date(s) administered	Sample size	Margin of Error	Hal Heiner	Jonathan Robertson	Chris Thieneman	Unde- cided
Survey USA (report)	May 10–12, 2010	446	± 4.6%	63%	1%	25%	10%
Survey USA (report)	April 9–12, 2010	482	± 4.6%	42%	9%	25%	24%
Survey USA (report)	March 8–11, 2010	449	± 4.7%	30%	6%	34%	30%

=== Primary results ===
Republican primary results
Party	Candidate	Votes	%
Republican	Hal Heiner	33,198	67.51
Republican	Chis Thieneman	14,037	28.54
Republican	Jonathon Robertson	1,940	3.95
Total votes		49,175	100.00

== Independent candidates ==
- Nimbus Couzin, businessman
- Jerry Mills

== General election ==
=== Polling ===
Poll source	Date(s) administered	Sample size	Margin of Error	Nimbus Couzin (I)	Greg Fischer (D)	Jackie Green (I)	Hal Heiner (R)	Jerry Mills (I)	Unde- cided
Survey USA (report)	September 23–26, 2010	596	±4.1%	0%	48%	3%	42%	1%	6%
Survey USA (report)	August 27–30, 2010	618	±4.0%	0%	47%	2%	45%	1%	5%
Braun Research (report)	August 9–10, 2010	502	±4.4%	0.2%	40.7%	3.2%	33.7%	0.8%	21.3%
SurveyUSA (report)	July 29 – August 1, 2010	538	±4.3%	2%	45%	3%	45%	––	4%

=== Results ===
Louisville mayoral election, 2010
Party	Candidate	Votes	%	±%
Democratic	Greg Fischer	132,050	51.10%	−16.09%
Republican	Hal Heiner	125,178	48.44%	+17.18%
Independent	Nimbus Couzin	499	0.19%	
Independent	Jerry T. Mills	474	0.18%	
Write-ins		200	0.08%	
Majority		6,872	2.66%	−33.27%
Turnout		258,401		
Democratic hold		Swing		
