= Chris Lewis (American politician) =

Kentucky politician

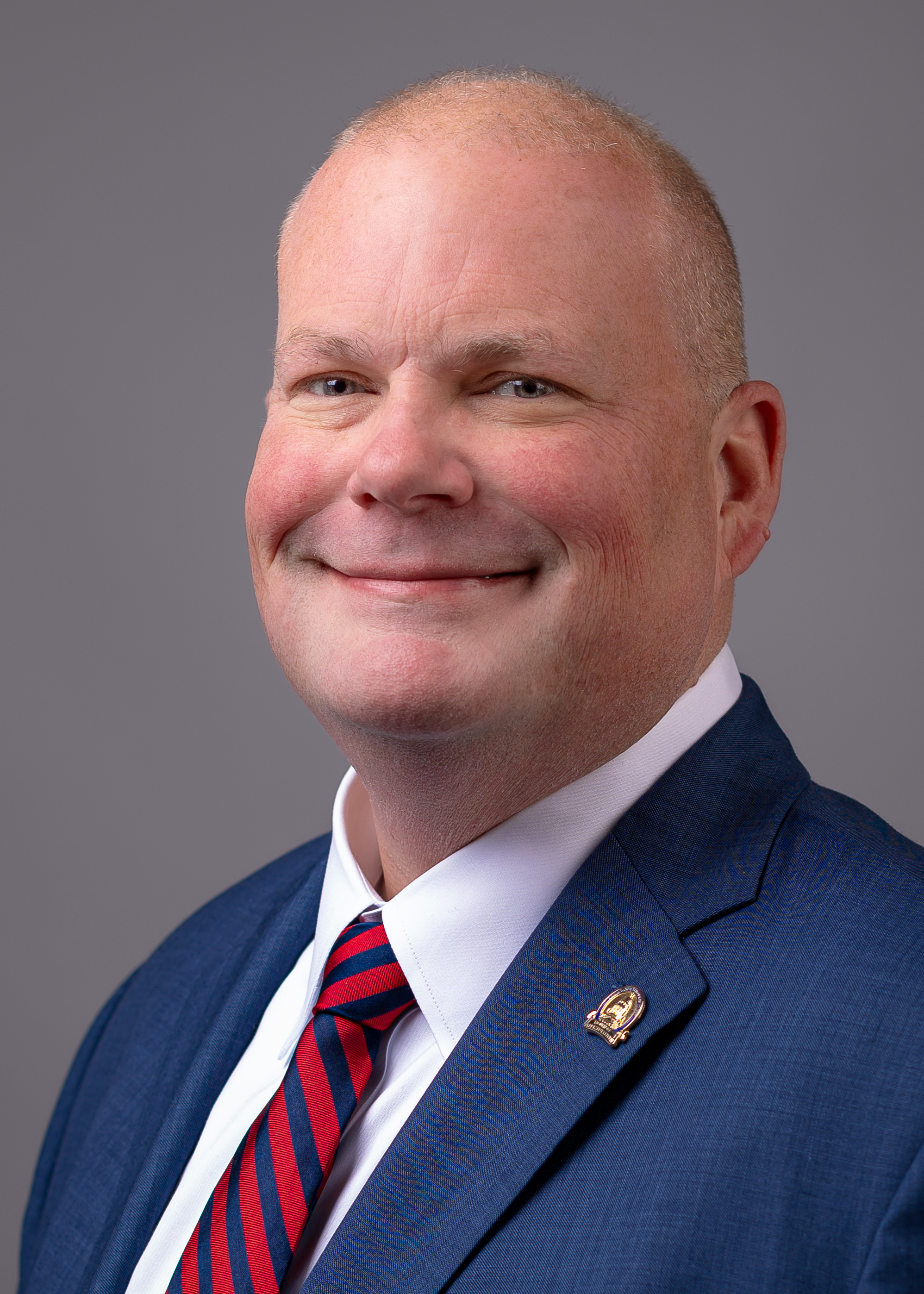
- Official portrait, 2024

Member of the Kentucky House of Representatives from the 29th district
- Incumbent
- Assumed office January 1, 2025
- Preceded by: Kevin Bratcher

Personal details
- Born: December 14, 1979 (age 46)
- Party: Republican

Christopher Wayne Lewis (born December 14, 1979) is an American politician who has served as a member of the Kentucky House of Representatives since January 2025. He represents the 29th district, which includes a southeastern portion of Jefferson County. Lewis was defeated for reelection in 2026, losing to Democratic candidate Cassie Blausey.

== Political career ==
Lewis was elected in the 2024 Kentucky House of Representatives election following the retirement of incumbent representative Kevin Bratcher to run for the Louisville Metro Council. He received 57.5 percent of the vote, defeating Democratic candidate Timothy Findley Jr. He defeated two other candidates in the May primary election.

== Electoral history ==
=== 2024 ===
Republican primary results
Party	Candidate	Votes	%
Republican	Chris Lewis	2,063	68.0
Republican	Debbie Peden	822	27.1
Republican	Wyatt Allison	151	5.0
Total votes		3,036	100.0

2024 Kentucky House of Representatives 29th district election
Party	Candidate	Votes	%
Republican	Chris Lewis	14,051	57.5
Democratic	Timothy Findley Jr.	10,371	42.5
Total votes		24,422	100.0
Republican hold			

Kentucky House of Representatives
Preceded by Kevin Bratcher	Member of the Kentucky House of Representatives from the 29th district 2025–present	Succeeded by incumbent
