= One Touch Make Ready =

US civil engineering laws

One Touch Make Ready (also known as One Touch, and often abbreviated as OTMR) is the various statutes and local ordinances passed by various local governments and utilities in the United States, which require the owners of utility poles to allow a single construction crew to make changes to multiple utility wires.

== Effect ==
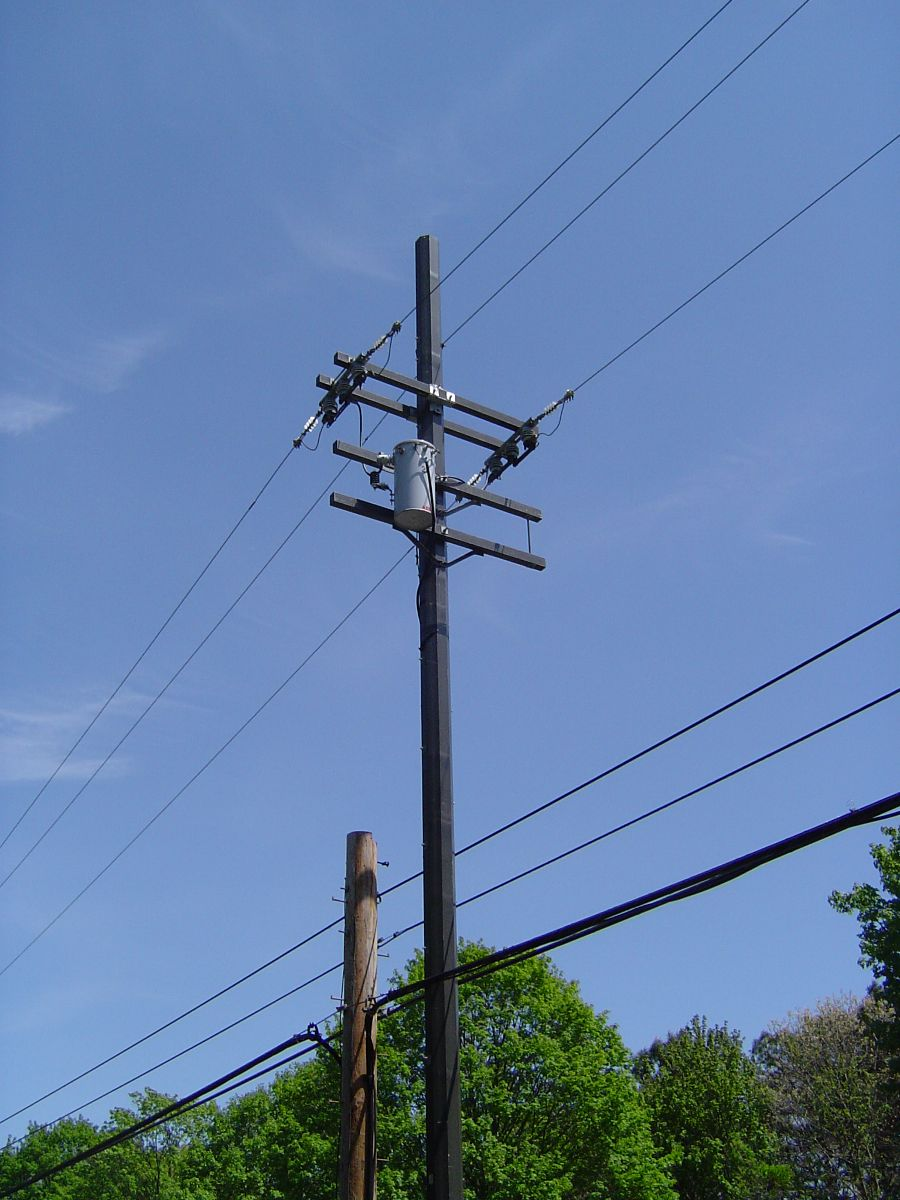
Standard utility pole in the United States.

=== Background ===
Across the United States, utility poles in a given area may be owned by the local government, a municipal electric company, a private entity, or any combination of the three. In most cases, the poles are owned by a private entity, like a local incumbent phone company or electric company.

==== Make Ready Work ====
Before an Internet Service Provider (or any company) can add a new attachment or line to a utility pole, the existing attachments may need to be moved around so that the pole can be made ready to handle a new attachment or line. This is known as 'Make Ready work.' The reason Make Ready work is necessary is that, under Federal Law, to prevent the risk of outages or other issues, lines on utility poles must be spaced a certain distance apart from each other based on how many lines are on the pole.

Under federal guidelines, Make Ready Work must occur sequentially, meaning that attachments can only be moved in the order with which they were originally placed on the line. This process can create massive delays, as well as other large disruptions in high traffic areas, such as alongside major roadways. In addition, the make ready work can take months, or even years, to complete as every company involved must send out their own approved contractor to move only their respective attachment. Each contractor must also schedule their work to not conflict with other contractors performing Make Ready Work, as well as taking into account other local factors, such as weather, traffic, and maintenance work (such as road paving). These factors must be considered as the United States primarily uses aerial work platforms to perform Make Ready Work.

=== One Touch Make Ready ===
To rectify these issues, several local governments have passed One Touch Make Ready legislation. While specific portions of the statutes vary, all carry a unifying theme that under these laws, certified construction crews chosen either by the pole owners or local governments are allowed to make all the necessary changes to a utility pole to make it ready for a new attachment.

In a location which has adopted one touch make-ready, companies that own utility poles must agree on one or more common contractors that have permission to move existing attachments on a pole, allowing a single crew to move all attachments on a pole on a single visit, rather than sending in a unique crew to move each attachment sequentially.

=== Differences between localities ===
==== Nashville ====
Nashville's OTMR ordinance is unique in that it requires a company that has reached an agreement to install a new line on a pole to give every company already on the pole 30 days' notice to move their equipment. If those companies have not moved their equipment within 30 days, then the company installing the new line can perform the complex make-ready work themselves. If that work causes any errors or problems, the companies already on the pole can recoup expenses caused by those errors from the company that did the work.

== Implementation in various areas ==
As of August 2017, only three cities in the United States have One Touch Make Ready statutes: Louisville, Kentucky; Nashville, Tennessee; and San Antonio, Texas. Numerous other cities are in various stages along the process of implementing the One Touch Make Ready system.

=== Louisville, Kentucky ===
On February 11, 2016, the City Council of Louisville, Kentucky voted 23–0 to adopt a One Touch Make-Ready Statute, making it the first city in the country to adopt such legislation. According to city councilman Bill Hollander, who sponsored the legislation "This will help businesses locate here and grow here. It will create jobs, and will retain and attract our young people and make Louisville broadband ready." These sentiments were echoed by Louisville Mayor Greg Fischer, who stated that it would help lay the groundwork for entities like Google Fiber, and said "Tonight's vote puts Louisville one step closer toward becoming a Google Fiber city." The legislation states that an applicant for attachment must first receive approval from the existing pole owners, at which point it may contract a pre-approved construction crew to perform all make ready work at its own expense. Pole owners and pre-existing providers whose wires were moved may choose to do post-make ready work inspections and call for remedial work if needed, at the new provider's expense.

=== San Antonio, Texas ===
On May 6, 2016, San Antonio's municipal utility, CPS Energy, adopted broad new guidelines which included many of the fundamental principles of One Touch Make Ready legislation. The standards include specific requirements for OTMR, and include what needs to happen before, during and after the process. The 128-page standards are far more detailed than the legislation passed by Louisville, Kentucky a few months prior. This is mainly due to CPS being an electric company. The Introduction of the standards states:

From a holistic perspective, the[se] Standards seek to balance the competing needs and interests of multiple communications providers to access and utilize CPS Energy Poles, while at the same time recognizing that the core purpose and function of these Poles is for CPS Energy's safe and reliable distribution and delivery of electric services to CPS Energy customers. Hence, any use of CPS Energy's Poles must at all times ensure the continued operational integrity, safety, and reliability of CPS Energy's Facilities, electric services, personnel and the general public.

The standards go on to lay out technical provisions, administrative procedures, as well as various specific provisions for both wired and wireless utility pole attachments. They incorporate recommendations from the FCC on how best to expand broadband while also addressing safety concerns by working into the guidelines various safety standards recommended by the Occupational Safety and Health Administration (OSHA).

=== Nashville, Tennessee ===
On August 2, 2016, the Metropolitan Council of Nashville and Davidson County began to debate its own One Touch Make Ready Ordinance. The measure, sponsored by Councilman Anthony Davis, was nearly identical to the measure passed by the city of Louisville several months prior. On September 6, 2016, the Nashville City Council Approved the Measure 32–7 on a roll-call vote, as the Council's computer systems were down. On September 20, 2016, Councilwoman Tanaka Vercher, a critic of the bill, proposed a resolution that would delay voting on the bill for two Council meetings. This resolution was defeated 26–12. A few hours later, the City Council passed the OTMR bill via voice vote. After the vote, Nashville Mayor Megan Barry, stated she would sign the bill.

On September 21, 2016, the Mayor of Nashville, Tennessee, Megan Barry, signed into law the city's OTMR ordinance. The ordinance exists under Nashville Law as Ordinance BL2016-343 Notably, throughout the entire process of the debate amongst council lawmakers on the specifics of the bill, Barry remained neutral on the bill's contents, refusing to comment on the bill's status, and only encouraging lawmakers and providers to seek a compromise.

== Arguments ==
=== In favor ===
==== Reduced cost, time, and disruption ====
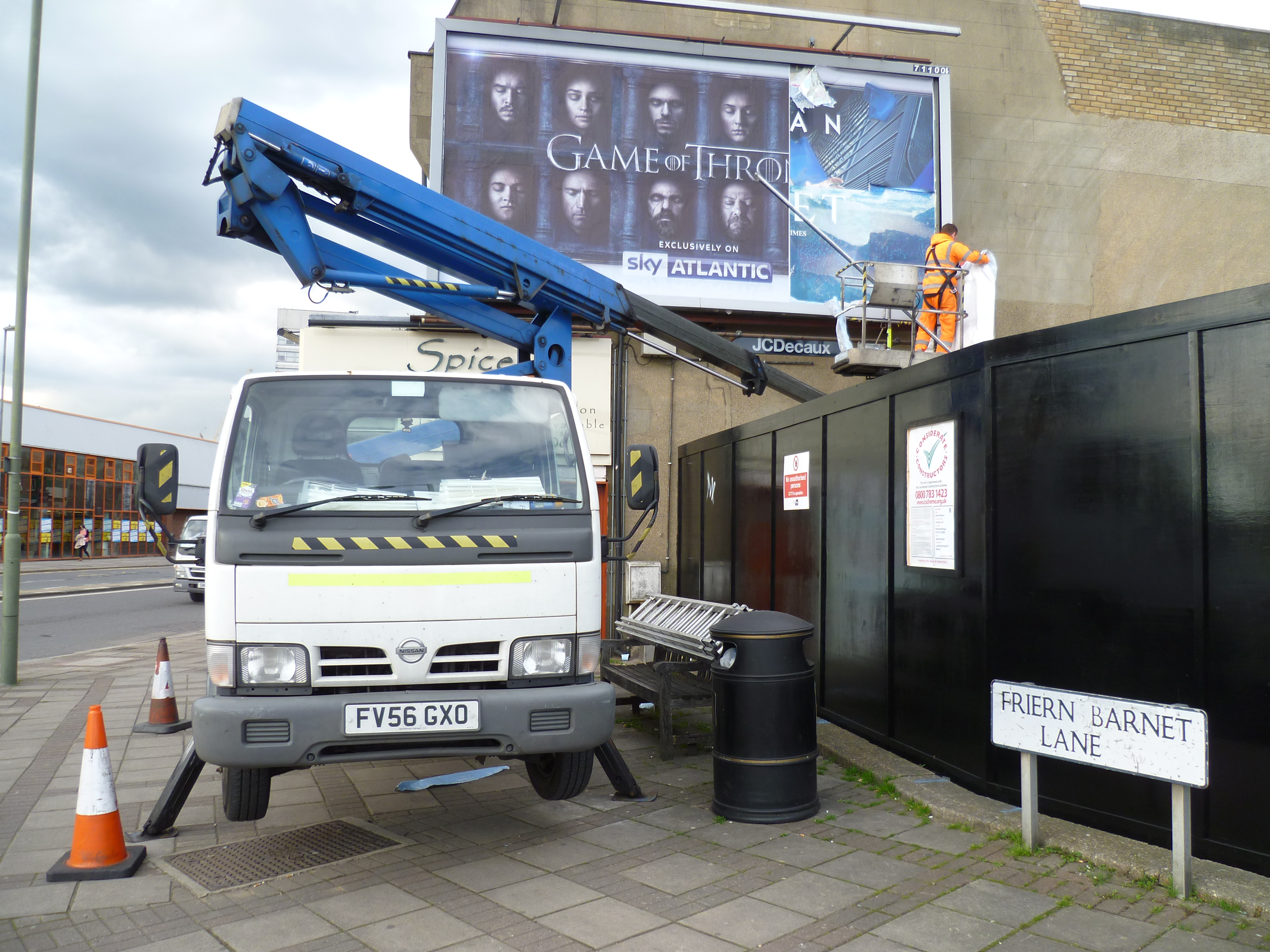
An aerial work platform.

Supporters, such as the Fiber to the Home Council (FTTHC) and the National Cable and Telecommunications Association (NCTA), argue that OTMR policies drastically reduce the cost of adding additional lines, noting that allowing a single crew to work on a line over the course of a single workday, as opposed to multiple crews working on multiple, often non-sequential days, reduces the financial cost of adding additional lines, by decreasing the number of workers needed to install a new line, thereby decreasing the total number of man-hours worked. Further, the FTTHC argues that OTMR policies reduce the traffic disruption caused by the large Aerial work platforms used by the overwhelming majority of utility pole maintenance companies in the United States.

==== Increased Competition ====
Supporters, such as Google Fiber and several lawmakers, have argued that OTMR policies create and encourage competition, as they can theoretically allow any outside Internet service provider to lay networks of fiber-optic cables, thus leading to a breakup of the various local internet monopolies which exist across the United States.

=== Opposed ===
Numerous groups have criticized OTMR since its implementation in several cities. The American Legislative Exchange Council (ALEC), along with several lobbying groups, have critiqued the proposal. In addition, the measure has received extremely vocal opposition from cable and telephone providers, mainly AT&T and Comcast, who together have thus far filed lawsuits against every city which has successfully passed OTMR ordinances.

==== Federal oversight ====
Opponents, including AT&T, Comcast, and the Nashville Electric Service (NES), have argued that the regulation of telecommunications poles falls under the purview of the Federal Communications Commission. To back this up, they cite federal pole attachment rules, which mandate the Federal Communications Commission, not local municipalities, regulate telecommunications poles. However, on October 30, 2016, in response to the case AT&T v. Louisville Metro, the Federal Communications Commission stated that states which have opted out of the FCC guidelines (including Kentucky) are not subject to the Federal Pole Attachment rules.

==== Involvement of Google Fiber ====
Opponents, including the American Legislative Exchange Council, have criticized the policy as a blatant attempt by local officials to "bend over backward" to ensure the continued support of Google Fiber's expansion within their respective cities. ALEC further contends that cities are willing to spend millions of taxpayer dollars to defend legislation in court that they see as only a way to appease Google. They cite Google's willingness to join as defendants in every OTMR lawsuit filed as of August 2017.

==== Rights of corporations ====
Opponents such as the American Legislative Exchange Council have argued that OTMR ordinances violate the property rights of corporations to control what happens on their respective lines. They further claim that OTMR ordinances violate federal property law by allegedly allowing any third party to relocate equipment on a pole, without notifying the equipment's owners, unless the third party believes there will be a service outage. However, so far, all cities which have successfully passed OTMR ordinances have included provisions which mandate that only contractors approved by the pole's owners may work on the lines.

==== Union concerns ====
Opponents, such as the Communications Workers of America (the largest communications labor union in the United States), have argued against One Touch Make Ready proposals on the grounds that the new proposals have the potential to create unsafe working conditions, as well as violate existing labor contracts. In their filing with the Federal Communications Commission on the matter, the union argues that since new attachers would not be required to submit formal applications, this could lead to a situation where existing infrastructure could be damaged by workers who are unfamiliar with the lines. The union further emphasizes that pole owners should be able to conduct a thorough review of the lines before any work can be done.

== Legality ==
States where One Touch Make Ready can legally be implemented, according to the Federal Communications Commission

Under the guidelines of the Federal Communications Commission, states are presented with two options for the regulation of their utility poles. They can either pass legislation recognizing the right of the FCC to regulate their utility poles, or states can form their own regulatory agencies and maintain their right to self-regulate their utility poles. As of 2016, thirty states have turned over regulatory power to the FCC, while the remaining twenty states have maintained their right to self-regulate. All Territories of the United States and Insular areas must adopt the federal guidelines.

According to the Federal Communications Commission in 2016, under current regulatory statutes, localities that reside in states which have forfeited their right to self-regulate their utility poles to the federal government are unable to implement One Touch Make Ready legislation in its current form. The twenty states which maintained their right to self-regulate, and thus can pass OTMR legislation are:

- Alaska
- Arkansas
- California
- Connecticut
- Delaware
- Idaho
- Illinois
- Louisiana
- Kentucky
- Maine
- Massachusetts
- Michigan
- New Hampshire
- New Jersey
- New York
- Ohio
- Oregon
- Utah
- Vermont
- Washington

== Legal challenges ==
=== AT&T vs. Louisville Metro Government ===
On February 25, 2016, AT&T (which owns an estimated 25-40% of Louisville, Kentucky's utility poles) filed a lawsuit in federal court against the Louisville Metro Government. In the lawsuit, officially titled BellSouth Telecommunications LLC vs. Louisville/Jefferson County Metro Government, AT&T argued that the city's One Touch Make Ready ordinance violated state and federal law. In the 11-page filing, AT&T asked a federal judge to clarify that the power to regulate pole attachments lies solely with the Kentucky Public Service Commission, as well as with the Federal Communications Commission. In response to the lawsuit, Louisville Mayor Greg Fischer stated: "We will vigorously defend the lawsuit filed today by AT&T, as Gigabit fiber is too important to our city's future." AT&T responded by stating that the ordinance allowed third parties to seize its property temporarily. In a statement, an AT&T spokesman said: "Unless the court declares the ordinance invalid and permanently enjoins Louisville Metro from enforcing it, AT&T will suffer irreparable harm that cannot be addressed by recovery of damages."

On February 26, 2016, in an official blog post titled "Standing With Louisville," Chris Levendos, Google Fiber's Director of National Deployment and Operations stood by the city, stating: "Google Fiber stands with the city of Louisville and the other cities across the country that are taking steps to bring faster, better broadband to their residents."

On June 29, 2016, Attorneys for Frontier Communications filed a briefing in federal court asking to join AT&T as plaintiffs in the case. In their briefing, Frontier argued that, even though they do not serve the state of Kentucky, the ordinance's "unprecedented scope" could set a precedent that could harm Frontier's business in the future. Frontier also noted that they were not paid by AT&T to assist in the suit, nor were they asked about it.

On October 6, 2016, Attorneys for Google Fiber filed a court briefing that, if approved, would allow the company to assist in defending against the suit. In their filing, they claim the ordinance is: "a valid exercise of Louisville Metro's unquestioned authority to manage construction activities in public rights-of-way." Further, the attorneys argued that the ordinance would "enhance public safety while reducing disturbance and congestion."

On October 31, 2016, in response to the lawsuit, the Federal Communications Commission released a statement, which guaranteed that the city's OTMR ordinance does not conflict with federal law. In the filing, the FCC stated that "[AT&T] maintains in its motion for summary judgment that the Louisville Ordinance conflicts with, and is therefore preempted by, the federal pole-attachment rules promulgated by the Commission under Section 224. That argument is wrong as a matter of law."

On August 16, 2017, US District Court Judge David Hayes rejected AT&T's arguments and threw out the lawsuit. "A one-touch make-ready approach inherently regulates public rights-of-way because it reduces the number of encumbrances or burdens placed on public rights-of-way," Hale wrote. "The one-touch make-ready ordinance requires that all necessary make-ready work be performed by a single crew, lessening the impact of make-ready work on public rights-of-way." Hale also ruled that FCC guidelines do not apply in Kentucky, as the state exempted itself from those laws.

=== AT&T/Comcast vs. Nashville Metro Government ===
On September 22, 2016, AT&T filed a lawsuit in federal court against the Metro Government of Nashville, Tennessee, less than 24 hours after the city had passed its One Touch Make Ready Ordinance. At the time, AT&T owned approximately 20% of the utility poles within the Nashville Metro area. In the lawsuit, titled BellSouth Telecommunications, LLC, D/B/A AT&T, Tennessee versus The Metropolitan Government of Nashville and Davidson County, Tennessee; In her official capacity as Mayor; and Mark Sturtevant, in his official capacity as transitional interim Director of the Department of Public Works, AT&T argued that the sole authority to regulate utility poles lies with the Federal Communications Commission. The lawsuit sought from the U.S. District Court for the Middle District of Tennessee a permanent injunction against the city, preventing the ordinance from ever going into effect. Notably, the lawsuit differed from the one filed against the city of Louisville in that it did not claim that the state had the power to regulate utility poles.

On October 26, 2016, Comcast filed a lawsuit in federal court against the Metro Government of Nashville over the city's One Touch ordinance. Comcast, like AT&T, sought a permanent injunction to prevent the ordinance from going into effect. In response to the filing, Nashville Mayor Megan Barry said: "One Touch Make Ready has been litigated in the court of public opinion, and the public overwhelmingly supports this measure designed to speed up the deployment of high-speed fiber in Nashville. Now, we hope that this federal litigation is quickly resolved so that we can get on with the business of expanding access to gigabit Internet throughout Davidson County."

On October 31, 2016, Nashville Metro filed a request with a federal judge to consolidate the two lawsuits. In the filing, attorneys representing the city argued for why the cases should be consolidated:

Defendants propose that consolidation is proper because: (1) both cases arrive from substantially similar operative facts and claims and involve similar defenses relating to the Metropolitan Government's enactment of Ordinance BL2016-343; (2) Plaintiff's civil cover sheet in Comcast references this case as a related case (Comcast, Doc. No. 1-3); (3) allowing the cases to proceed separately risks inconsistent adjudication; (4) adjudicating parallel cases in the same Court would inevitably require duplicative tasks and duplicative rulings; and (5) both cases are already in the same Court, so consolidation would not require a case to be transferred to a different Court. For these reasons, Defendants propose that consolidation of these cases is in the best interest of the parties and promotes judicial economy.

On November 10, 2016, Ken Sharp, the federal judge overseeing the case, approved the request to merge the lawsuits. He also granted an extension to the city's deadline to file a response to the initial filing of the lawsuit, extending their deadline to November 14.

On November 14, 2016, the city of Nashville filed a motion to dismiss the lawsuit, citing that AT&T did not provide information regarding exactly where the local ordinance conflicted with federal law. "The Metropolitan Government determined on a municipal level what approach to rights-of-way management would best serve local needs, and enacted an ordinance that aligns with and supports federal policy," Nashville's filing supporting the motion said.

=== Charter Communications vs. Louisville Metro Government ===
On October 5, 2016, Charter Communications, a utility company that owns Time Warner Cable and does business in Louisville, filed a lawsuit against the city's Metro Government. In the lawsuit, Charter alleges that the city's OTMR ordinance violates Charter's fifth amendment rights, specifically over what is referred to as the "Taking's Clause." The takings clause states that "... private property [shall not] be taken for public use, without just compensation." Charter's lawsuit also hinges on the argument that their right to "speak" as a corporation is being violated, however, Charter's lawyers did not specifically reference any infringement by the local government.

On June 29, 2017, it was revealed through court filings that the case, officially titled "Insight Kentucky Partners versus Louisville/Jefferson County Metro Government" would be going to trial. The trial is set to be overseen by U.S. District Senior Judge Charles Ralph Simpson III.

After a federal judge threw out AT&T's lawsuit against the city of Louisville, it was revealed that Charter's lawsuit would be unaffected.

=== Nashville Electric Service vs. Nashville Metro Government ===
On October 21, 2016, the Nashville Electric Service (abbreviated NES), which is one of the twelve largest public electric utilities in the United States, filed a lawsuit against the Metro Government of Nashville, Tennessee. At the time, NES owned 80 percent of the utility poles in Nashville. After filing the lawsuit, a spokesman for the company said the OTMR ordinance forces the company to choose between complying with the new law or its existing contracts with AT&T, Comcast, as well as other internet providers. According to the court filing, the declaratory judgment is meant to clarify NES's rights and obligations. The company also stated that it had received a letter from AT&T, threatening to sue them if they complied with the law. In response to the lawsuit being filed, Nashville Mayor Megan Barry stated: "We believe in One Touch Make Ready and look forward to defending its legality. Our focus is simply on providing services to our citizens, who have expressed their desire for those services through their elected representatives."

On February 3, 2017, NES announced that it had reached an out-of-court settlement with Google Fiber, as well as the city of Nashville, over the OTMR policy. In the agreement, "Google Fiber [has] promised NES it would pay any potential damages that result from NES abiding by the ordinance in relation to the deployment of Google Fiber," NES President and CEO Decosta Jenkins said in a statement issued Friday. She further clarified "This is a win for NES, Google Fiber, Nashville and residents who are looking forward to having access to Google Fiber." As part of this settlement, NES dropped its pending lawsuits against Google and the city of Nashville.

== See also ==
- Google Fiber
