= Kentucky's 29th House of Representatives district =

American legislative district

Kentucky's 29th State House of Representatives district
Representative
Chris Lewis; R–Louisville
since January 1, 2025
- Registration: 45.5% Democratic; 42.9% Republican; 11.1% No party preference
- Demographics: 68.7% White; 14.1% Black; 6.3% Hispanic; 4.0% Asian; 0.1% Native American; 1.3% Other; 5.6% Multiracial
- Population (2024): 43,450
- Registered voters (2026): 36,177

Kentucky's 29th House of Representatives district is one of 100 districts in the Kentucky House of Representatives. It comprises part of Jefferson County. It has been represented by Chris Lewis (R–Louisville) since 2025. As of 2024, the district had a population of 43,450.

== Voter registration ==
On January 1, 2026, the district had 36,177 registered voters, who were registered with the following parties.

Party	Registration	
Party	Voters	%
Democratic	16,446	45.46
Republican	15,508	42.87
Independent	1,989	5.50
Libertarian	144	0.40
Green	27	0.07
Constitution	11	0.03
Reform	5	0.01
Socialist Workers	4	0.01
"Other"	2,043	5.65
Total	36,177	100.00

== List of members representing the district ==
Member	Party	Years	Electoral history	District location
Lindy Casebier (Louisville)	Republican	January 1, 1987 – January 1, 1993	Elected in 1986. Reelected in 1988. Reelected in 1990. Retired to run for the Kentucky Senate.	1985–1993; Jefferson County (part).
Dave Stengel (Louisville)	Democratic	January 1, 1993 – November 1996	Elected in 1992. Reelected in 1994. Resigned after being elected Commonwealth's Attorney.	1993–1997; Jefferson County (part).
Kevin Bratcher (Louisville)	Republican	January 1, 1997 – January 1, 2025	Elected in 1996. Reelected in 1998. Reelected in 2000. Reelected in 2002. Reelected in 2004. Reelected in 2006. Reelected in 2008. Reelected in 2010. Reelected in 2012. Reelected in 2014. Reelected in 2016. Reelected in 2018. Reelected in 2020. Reelected in 2022. Retired to run for the Louisville Metro Council.	1997–2003
Kevin Bratcher (Louisville)	Republican	January 1, 1997 – January 1, 2025	Elected in 1996. Reelected in 1998. Reelected in 2000. Reelected in 2002. Reelected in 2004. Reelected in 2006. Reelected in 2008. Reelected in 2010. Reelected in 2012. Reelected in 2014. Reelected in 2016. Reelected in 2018. Reelected in 2020. Reelected in 2022. Retired to run for the Louisville Metro Council.	2003–2015
Kevin Bratcher (Louisville)	Republican	January 1, 1997 – January 1, 2025	Elected in 1996. Reelected in 1998. Reelected in 2000. Reelected in 2002. Reelected in 2004. Reelected in 2006. Reelected in 2008. Reelected in 2010. Reelected in 2012. Reelected in 2014. Reelected in 2016. Reelected in 2018. Reelected in 2020. Reelected in 2022. Retired to run for the Louisville Metro Council.	2015–2023
Kevin Bratcher (Louisville)	Republican	January 1, 1997 – January 1, 2025	Elected in 1996. Reelected in 1998. Reelected in 2000. Reelected in 2002. Reelected in 2004. Reelected in 2006. Reelected in 2008. Reelected in 2010. Reelected in 2012. Reelected in 2014. Reelected in 2016. Reelected in 2018. Reelected in 2020. Reelected in 2022. Retired to run for the Louisville Metro Council.	2023–present
Chris Lewis (Louisville)	Republican	January 1, 2025 – present	Elected in 2024. Lost reelection.	2023–present
Cassie Blausey (Louisville)	Democratic	Assuming office January 1, 2027	Elected in 2026.	2023–present
