= List of members of the Louisville Metro Council =

This article contains a list of members of the Louisville Metro Council since its creation in 2003.

Year	Council District																									
Year	1	2	3	4	5	6	7	8	9	10	11	12	13	14	15	16	17	18	19	20	21	22	23	24	25	26
2003	Denise Bentley (D)	Barbara Shanklin (D)	Mary C. Woolridge (D)	Willie Bright (D)	Cheri Bryant Hamilton (D)	George Unseld (D)	Ken Fleming (R)	Tom Owen (D)	Tina Ward-Pugh (D)	Cyril Allgeier (D)	Kevin Kramer (R)	Rick Blackwell (D)	Ron Weston (D)	Bob Henderson (D)	George Melton (D)	Kelly Downard (R)	Glen Stuckel (R)	Julie Raque Adams (R)	Hal Heiner (R)	Stuart Benson (R)	Dan Johnson (D)	Robin Engel (R)	James Peden (R)	Madonna Flood (D)	Doug Hawkins (R)	Ellen Call (R)
2004	Denise Bentley (D)	Barbara Shanklin (D)	Mary C. Woolridge (D)	Willie Bright (D)	Cheri Bryant Hamilton (D)	George Unseld (D)	Ken Fleming (R)	Tom Owen (D)	Tina Ward-Pugh (D)	Cyril Allgeier (D)	Kevin Kramer (R)	Rick Blackwell (D)	Ron Weston (D)	Bob Henderson (D)	George Melton (D)	Kelly Downard (R)	Glen Stuckel (R)	Julie Raque Adams (R)	Hal Heiner (R)	Stuart Benson (R)	Dan Johnson (D)	Robin Engel (R)	James Peden (R)	Madonna Flood (D)	Doug Hawkins (R)	Ellen Call (R)
2005	Denise Bentley (D)	Barbara Shanklin (D)	Mary C. Woolridge (D)	Willie Bright (D)	Cheri Bryant Hamilton (D)	George Unseld (D)	Ken Fleming (R)	Tom Owen (D)	Tina Ward-Pugh (D)	Jim King (D)	Kevin Kramer (R)	Rick Blackwell (D)	Ron Weston (D)	Bob Henderson (D)	George Melton (D)	Kelly Downard (R)	Glen Stuckel (R)	Julie Raque Adams (R)	Hal Heiner (R)	Stuart Benson (R)	Dan Johnson (D)	Robin Engel (R)	James Peden (R)	Madonna Flood (D)	Doug Hawkins (R)	Ellen Call (R)
2005	Leonard Watkins (D)	Barbara Shanklin (D)	Mary C. Woolridge (D)	David Tandy (D)	Cheri Bryant Hamilton (D)	George Unseld (D)	Ken Fleming (R)	Tom Owen (D)	Tina Ward-Pugh (D)	Jim King (D)	Kevin Kramer (R)	Rick Blackwell (D)	Ron Weston (D)	Bob Henderson (D)	George Melton (D)	Kelly Downard (R)	Glen Stuckel (R)	Julie Raque Adams (R)	Hal Heiner (R)	Stuart Benson (R)	Dan Johnson (D)	Robin Engel (R)	James Peden (R)	Madonna Flood (D)	Doug Hawkins (R)	Ellen Call (R)
2006	Leonard Watkins (D)	Barbara Shanklin (D)	Mary C. Woolridge (D)	David Tandy (D)	Cheri Bryant Hamilton (D)	George Unseld (D)	Ken Fleming (R)	Tom Owen (D)	Tina Ward-Pugh (D)	Jim King (D)	Kevin Kramer (R)	Rick Blackwell (D)	Ron Weston (D)	Bob Henderson (D)	George Melton (D)	Kelly Downard (R)	Glen Stuckel (R)	Julie Raque Adams (R)	Hal Heiner (R)	Stuart Benson (R)	Dan Johnson (D)	Robin Engel (R)	James Peden (R)	Madonna Flood (D)	Doug Hawkins (R)	Ellen Call (R)
2006	Leonard Watkins (D)	Barbara Shanklin (D)	Mary C. Woolridge (D)	David Tandy (D)	Cheri Bryant Hamilton (D)	George Unseld (D)	Ken Fleming (R)	Tom Owen (D)	Tina Ward-Pugh (D)	Jim King (D)	Kevin Kramer (R)	Rick Blackwell (D)	Vicki Aubrey Welch (D)	Bob Henderson (D)	George Melton (D)	Kelly Downard (R)	Glen Stuckel (R)	Julie Raque Adams (R)	Hal Heiner (R)	Stuart Benson (R)	Dan Johnson (D)	Robin Engel (R)	James Peden (R)	Madonna Flood (D)	Doug Hawkins (R)	Ellen Call (R)
2007	Judy Green (D)	Barbara Shanklin (D)	Mary C. Woolridge (D)	David Tandy (D)	Cheri Bryant Hamilton (D)	George Unseld (D)	Ken Fleming (R)	Tom Owen (D)	Tina Ward-Pugh (D)	Jim King (D)	Kevin Kramer (R)	Rick Blackwell (D)	Vicki Aubrey Welch (D)	Bob Henderson (D)	Marianne Butler (D)	Kelly Downard (R)	Glen Stuckel (R)	Julie Raque Adams (R)	Hal Heiner (R)	Stuart Benson (R)	Dan Johnson (D)	Robin Engel (R)	James Peden (R)	Madonna Flood (D)	Doug Hawkins (R)	Ellen Call (R)
2008	Judy Green (D)	Barbara Shanklin (D)	Mary C. Woolridge (D)	David Tandy (D)	Cheri Bryant Hamilton (D)	George Unseld (D)	Ken Fleming (R)	Tom Owen (D)	Tina Ward-Pugh (D)	Jim King (D)	Kevin Kramer (R)	Rick Blackwell (D)	Vicki Aubrey Welch (D)	Bob Henderson (D)	Marianne Butler (D)	Kelly Downard (R)	Glen Stuckel (R)	Julie Raque Adams (R)	Hal Heiner (R)	Stuart Benson (R)	Dan Johnson (D)	Robin Engel (R)	James Peden (R)	Madonna Flood (D)	Doug Hawkins (R)	Ellen Call (R)
2009	Judy Green (D)	Barbara Shanklin (D)	Mary C. Woolridge (D)	David Tandy (D)	Cheri Bryant Hamilton (D)	George Unseld (D)	Ken Fleming (R)	Tom Owen (D)	Tina Ward-Pugh (D)	Jim King (D)	Kevin Kramer (R)	Rick Blackwell (D)	Vicki Aubrey Welch (D)	Bob Henderson (D)	Marianne Butler (D)	Kelly Downard (R)	Glen Stuckel (R)	Jon Ackerson (R)	Hal Heiner (R)	Stuart Benson (R)	Dan Johnson (D)	Robin Engel (R)	James Peden (R)	Madonna Flood (D)	Doug Hawkins (R)	Brent Ackerson (D)
2010	Judy Green (D)	Barbara Shanklin (D)	Mary C. Woolridge (D)	David Tandy (D)	Cheri Bryant Hamilton (D)		Ken Fleming (R)	Tom Owen (D)	Tina Ward-Pugh (D)	Jim King (D)	Kevin Kramer (R)	Rick Blackwell (D)	Vicki Aubrey Welch (D)	Bob Henderson (D)	Marianne Butler (D)	Kelly Downard (R)	Glen Stuckel (R)	Jon Ackerson (R)	Hal Heiner (R)	Stuart Benson (R)	Dan Johnson (D)	Robin Engel (R)	James Peden (R)	Madonna Flood (D)	Doug Hawkins (R)	Brent Ackerson (D)
2010	Judy Green (D)	Barbara Shanklin (D)	Mary C. Woolridge (D)	David Tandy (D)	Cheri Bryant Hamilton (D)	Deonte Hollowell (I)	Ken Fleming (R)	Tom Owen (D)	Tina Ward-Pugh (D)	Jim King (D)	Kevin Kramer (R)	Rick Blackwell (D)	Vicki Aubrey Welch (D)	Bob Henderson (D)	Marianne Butler (D)	Kelly Downard (R)	Glen Stuckel (R)	Jon Ackerson (R)	Hal Heiner (R)	Stuart Benson (R)	Dan Johnson (D)	Robin Engel (R)	James Peden (R)	Madonna Flood (D)	Doug Hawkins (R)	Brent Ackerson (D)
2011	Judy Green (D)	Barbara Shanklin (D)	Mary C. Woolridge (D)	David Tandy (D)	Cheri Bryant Hamilton (D)	David James (D)	Ken Fleming (R)	Tom Owen (D)	Tina Ward-Pugh (D)	Jim King (D)	Kevin Kramer (R)	Rick Blackwell (D)	Vicki Aubrey Welch (D)	Bob Henderson (D)	Marianne Butler (D)	Kelly Downard (R)	Glen Stuckel (R)	Jon Ackerson (R)	Jerry T. Miller (R)	Stuart Benson (R)	Dan Johnson (D)	Robin Engel (R)	James Peden (R)	Madonna Flood (D)	Doug Hawkins (R)	Brent Ackerson (D)
2011	Attica Scott (D)	Barbara Shanklin (D)	Mary C. Woolridge (D)	David Tandy (D)	Cheri Bryant Hamilton (D)	David James (D)	Ken Fleming (R)	Tom Owen (D)	Tina Ward-Pugh (D)	Jim King (D)	Kevin Kramer (R)	Rick Blackwell (D)	Vicki Aubrey Welch (D)	Bob Henderson (D)	Marianne Butler (D)	Kelly Downard (R)	Glen Stuckel (R)	Jon Ackerson (R)	Jerry T. Miller (R)	Stuart Benson (R)	Dan Johnson (D)	Robin Engel (R)	James Peden (R)	Madonna Flood (D)	David Yates (D)	Brent Ackerson (D)
2012	Attica Scott (D)	Barbara Shanklin (D)	Mary C. Woolridge (D)	David Tandy (D)	Cheri Bryant Hamilton (D)	David James (D)	Ken Fleming (R)	Tom Owen (D)	Tina Ward-Pugh (D)	Jim King (D)	Kevin Kramer (R)	Rick Blackwell (D)	Vicki Aubrey Welch (D)	Bob Henderson (D)	Marianne Butler (D)	Kelly Downard (R)	Glen Stuckel (R)	Jon Ackerson (R)	Jerry T. Miller (R)	Stuart Benson (R)	Dan Johnson (D)	Robin Engel (R)	James Peden (R)	Madonna Flood (D)	David Yates (D)	Brent Ackerson (D)
2013	Attica Scott (D)	Barbara Shanklin (D)	Mary C. Woolridge (D)	David Tandy (D)	Cheri Bryant Hamilton (D)	David James (D)	Ken Fleming (R)	Tom Owen (D)	Tina Ward-Pugh (D)	Jim King (D)	Kevin Kramer (R)	Rick Blackwell (D)	Vicki Aubrey Welch (D)	Cindi Fowler (D)	Marianne Butler (D)	Kelly Downard (R)	Glen Stuckel (R)	Marilyn Parker (R)	Jerry T. Miller (R)	Stuart Benson (R)	Dan Johnson (D)	Robin Engel (R)	James Peden (R)	Madonna Flood (D)	David Yates (D)	Brent Ackerson (D)
2014	Attica Scott (D)	Barbara Shanklin (D)	Mary C. Woolridge (D)	David Tandy (D)	Cheri Bryant Hamilton (D)	David James (D)	Ken Fleming (R)	Tom Owen (D)	Tina Ward-Pugh (D)	Jim King (D)	Kevin Kramer (R)	Rick Blackwell (D)	Vicki Aubrey Welch (D)	Cindi Fowler (D)	Marianne Butler (D)	Kelly Downard (R)	Glen Stuckel (R)	Marilyn Parker (R)	Jerry T. Miller (R)	Stuart Benson (R)	Dan Johnson (D)	Robin Engel (R)	James Peden (R)	Madonna Flood (D)	David Yates (D)	Brent Ackerson (D)
2015	Jessica Green (D)	Barbara Shanklin (D)	Mary C. Woolridge (D)	David Tandy (D)	Cheri Bryant Hamilton (D)	David James (D)	Angela Leet (R)	Tom Owen (D)	Bill Hollander (D)	Jim King (D)	Kevin Kramer (R)	Rick Blackwell (D)	Vicki Aubrey Welch (D)	Cindi Fowler (D)	Marianne Butler (D)	Kelly Downard (R)	Glen Stuckel (R)	Marilyn Parker (R)	Julie Denton (R)	Stuart Benson (R)	Dan Johnson (D)	Robin Engel (R)	James Peden (R)	Madonna Flood (D)	David Yates (D)	Brent Ackerson (D)
2015	Jessica Green (D)	Barbara Shanklin (D)	Mary C. Woolridge (D)	David Tandy (D)	Cheri Bryant Hamilton (D)	David James (D)	Angela Leet (R)	Tom Owen (D)	Bill Hollander (D)	Steve Magre (D)	Kevin Kramer (R)	Rick Blackwell (D)	Vicki Aubrey Welch (D)	Cindi Fowler (D)	Marianne Butler (D)	Kelly Downard (R)	Glen Stuckel (R)	Marilyn Parker (R)	Julie Denton (R)	Stuart Benson (R)	Dan Johnson (D)	Robin Engel (R)	James Peden (R)	Madonna Flood (D)	David Yates (D)	Brent Ackerson (D)
2016	Jessica Green (D)	Barbara Shanklin (D)	Mary C. Woolridge (D)	David Tandy (D)	Cheri Bryant Hamilton (D)	David James (D)	Angela Leet (R)	Tom Owen (D)	Bill Hollander (D)	Pat Mulvihill (D)	Kevin Kramer (R)	Rick Blackwell (D)	Vicki Aubrey Welch (D)	Cindi Fowler (D)	Marianne Butler (D)	Kelly Downard (R)	Glen Stuckel (R)	Marilyn Parker (R)	Julie Denton (R)	Stuart Benson (R)	Dan Johnson (D)	Robin Engel (R)	James Peden (R)	Madonna Flood (D)	David Yates (D)	Brent Ackerson (D)
2017	Jessica Green (D)	Barbara Shanklin (D)	Mary C. Woolridge (D)	Barbara Sexton Smith (D)	Cheri Bryant Hamilton (D)	David James (D)	Angela Leet (R)	Brandon Coan (D)	Bill Hollander (D)	Pat Mulvihill (D)	Kevin Kramer (R)	Rick Blackwell (D)	Vicki Aubrey Welch (D)	Cindi Fowler (D)	Marianne Butler (D)	Scott W. Reed (R)	Glen Stuckel (R)	Marilyn Parker (R)	Julie Denton (R)	Stuart Benson (R)	Dan Johnson (D)	Robin Engel (R)	James Peden (R)	Madonna Flood (D)	David Yates (D)	Brent Ackerson (D)
2017	Jessica Green (D)	Barbara Shanklin (D)	Mary C. Woolridge (D)	Barbara Sexton Smith (D)	Cheri Bryant Hamilton (D)	David James (D)	Angela Leet (R)	Brandon Coan (D)	Bill Hollander (D)	Pat Mulvihill (D)	Kevin Kramer (R)	Rick Blackwell (D)	Vicki Aubrey Welch (D)	Cindi Fowler (D)	Marianne Butler (D)	Scott W. Reed (R)	Glen Stuckel (R)	Marilyn Parker (R)	Julie Denton (R)	Stuart Benson (R)	Vitalis Lanshima (D)	Robin Engel (R)	James Peden (R)	Madonna Flood (D)	David Yates (D)	Brent Ackerson (D)
2018	Jessica Green (D)	Barbara Shanklin (D)	Mary C. Woolridge (D)	Barbara Sexton Smith (D)	Cheri Bryant Hamilton (D)	David James (D)	Angela Leet (R)	Brandon Coan (D)	Bill Hollander (D)	Pat Mulvihill (D)	Kevin Kramer (R)	Rick Blackwell (D)	Vicki Aubrey Welch (D)	Cindi Fowler (D)	Marianne Butler (D)	Scott W. Reed (R)	Glen Stuckel (R)	Marilyn Parker (R)	Julie Denton (R)	Stuart Benson (R)	Vitalis Lanshima (D)	Robin Engel (R)	James Peden (R)	Madonna Flood (D)	David Yates (D)	Brent Ackerson (D)
2019	Jessica Green (D)	Barbara Shanklin (D)	Keisha Dorsey (D)	Barbara Sexton Smith (D)	Donna Lyvette Purvis (D)	David James (D)	Paula McCraney (I)	Brandon Coan (D)	Bill Hollander (D)	Pat Mulvihill (D)	Kevin Kramer (R)	Rick Blackwell (D)	Mark Fox (D)	Cindi Fowler (D)	Kevin Triplett (D)	Scott W. Reed (R)	Markus Winkler (D)	Marilyn Parker (R)	Anthony Piagentini (R)	Stuart Benson (R)	Nicole George (D)	Robin Engel (R)	James Peden (R)	Madonna Flood (D)	David Yates (D)	Brent Ackerson (D)
2020	Jessica Green (D)	Barbara Shanklin (D)	Keisha Dorsey (D)	Barbara Sexton Smith (D)	Donna Lyvette Purvis (D)	David James (D)	Paula McCraney (I)	Brandon Coan (D)	Bill Hollander (D)	Pat Mulvihill (D)	Kevin Kramer (R)	Rick Blackwell (D)	Mark Fox (D)	Cindi Fowler (D)	Kevin Triplett (D)	Scott W. Reed (R)	Markus Winkler (D)	Marilyn Parker (R)	Anthony Piagentini (R)	Stuart Benson (R)	Nicole George (D)	Robin Engel (R)	James Peden (R)	Madonna Flood (D)	David Yates (D)	Brent Ackerson (D)
2021	Jessica Green (D)	Barbara Shanklin (D)	Keisha Dorsey (D)	Jecorey Arthur (D)	Donna Lyvette Purvis (D)	David James (D)	Paula McCraney (I)	Cassie Chambers Armstrong (D)	Bill Hollander (D)	Pat Mulvihill (D)	Kevin Kramer (R)	Rick Blackwell (D)	Mark Fox (D)	Cindi Fowler (D)	Kevin Triplett (D)	Scott W. Reed (R)	Markus Winkler (D)	Marilyn Parker (R)	Anthony Piagentini (R)	Stuart Benson (R)	Nicole George (D)	Robin Engel (R)	James Peden (R)	Madonna Flood (D)	Amy Stewart (D)	Brent Ackerson (D)
2022	Angela Bowens (D)	Barbara Shanklin (D)	Keisha Dorsey (D)	Jecorey Arthur (D)	Donna Lyvette Purvis (D)	David James (D)	Paula McCraney (I)	Cassie Chambers Armstrong (D)	Bill Hollander (D)	Pat Mulvihill (D)	Kevin Kramer (R)	Rick Blackwell (D)	Mark Fox (D)	Cindi Fowler (D)	Kevin Triplett (D)	Scott W. Reed (R)	Markus Winkler (D)	Marilyn Parker (R)	Anthony Piagentini (R)	Stuart Benson (R)	Nicole George (D)	Robin Engel (R)	James Peden (R)	Madonna Flood (D)	Amy Stewart (D)	Brent Ackerson (D)
2023	Tammy Hawkins (D)	Barbara Shanklin (D)	Kumar Rashad (D)	Jecorey Arthur (D)	Donna Lyvette Purvis (D)	Phillip Baker (D)	Paula McCraney (I)	Ben Reno-Weber (D)	Andrew Owen (D)	Pat Mulvihill (D)	Kevin Kramer (R)	Rick Blackwell (D)	Dan Seum Jr. (R)	Cindi Fowler (D)	Jennifer Chappell (D)	Scott W. Reed (R)	Markus Winkler (D)	Marilyn Parker (R)	Anthony Piagentini (R)	Stuart Benson (R)	Betsy Ruhe (D)	Robin Engel (R)	Jeff Hudson (R)	Madonna Flood (D)	Khalil Batshon (R)	Brent Ackerson (D)
2024	Tammy Hawkins (D)	Barbara Shanklin (D)	Shameka Parrish-Wright (D)	Jecorey Arthur (D)	Donna Lyvette Purvis (D)	Phillip Baker (D)	Paula McCraney (I)	Ben Reno-Weber (D)	Andrew Owen (D)	Pat Mulvihill (D)	Kevin Kramer (R)	Rick Blackwell (D)	Dan Seum Jr. (R)	Cindi Fowler (D)	Jennifer Chappell (D)	Scott W. Reed (R)	Markus Winkler (D)	Marilyn Parker (R)	Anthony Piagentini (R)	Stuart Benson (R)	Betsy Ruhe (D)	Robin Engel (R)	Jeff Hudson (R)	Madonna Flood (D)	Khalil Batshon (R)	Brent Ackerson (D)
2025	Tammy Hawkins (D)	Barbara Shanklin (D)	Shameka Parrish-Wright (D)	Ken Herndon (D)	Donna Lyvette Purvis (D)	J.P. Lyninger (D/DSA)	Paula McCraney (I)	Ben Reno-Weber (D)	Andrew Owen (D)	Josie Raymond (D)	Kevin Kramer (R)	Jonathan Joseph (R)	Dan Seum Jr. (R)	Crystal Bast (R)	Jennifer Chappell (D)	Scott W. Reed (R)	Markus Winkler (D)	Marilyn Parker (R)	Anthony Piagentini (R)	Stuart Benson (R)	Betsy Ruhe (D)	Kevin Bratcher (R)	Jeff Hudson (R)	Ginni Mulvey-Woolridge (R)	Khalil Batshon (R)	Brent Ackerson (D)
Election	Council District																									
