= Cassie Blausey =

American politician

Member-elect of the Kentucky House of Representatives from the 29th district
- Assuming office January 1, 2027
- Succeeding: Chris Lewis

Personal details
- Party: Democratic

Cassiopia Restrepo Blausey is an American politician. She is the Democratic member-elect of the Kentucky House of Representatives from the 29th district. Prior to her victory, she was the Kentucky Department of Education's executive administrator of School Choice.

== Biography ==
Blausey was born to Colombian immigrants who naturalized during her childhood, and raised in a Catholic household. Originally from New Jersey, the family moved to Fern Creek two years after her birth. After attending Louisville Male High School, she obtained a bachelor's degree from Centre College in 2008, a master's degree from University of Nevada, Las Vegas in 2010, and a JD from University of Louisville School of Law in 2014. She was the first member of her family to attend college.

Blausey's first job was at a McAlister's Deli in Jeffersontown. She later began working as an administrator at the Kentucky Department of Education (KYDOE), eventually becoming their executive administrator of School Choice. Her work at the KYDOE included helping draft the school improvement section of Kentucky's state plan pursuant to the Every Student Succeeds Act of 2015. She was featured in the Louisville Business First 40 Under 40 in 2021.

Blausey ran in Kentucky's 29th House of Representatives district in the 2026 election. After winning the Democratic nomination unopposed, she won the general election in November 2026, defeating Republican incumbent Chris Lewis 53% to 47%.

Blausey lives in Jeffersontown. Her daughter has autism. She was featured in an October 2020 Courier Journal article profiling several voters mobilizing other voters for the 2020 United States elections. She also makes customized crochet dolls, with depictions including Ruth Bader Ginsburg, Bernie Sanders, and The Office character Dwight Schrute.
