= 2024 Louisville Metro Council election =

- November 5, 2024

13 out of 26 seats in the Louisville Metro Council 14 seats needed for a majority
	Majority party	Minority party
Leader	Markus Winkler	Kevin Kramer
Party	Democratic	Republican
Leader since	January 3, 2023	January 5, 2024
Leader's seat	District 17	District 11
Last election	17	9
Seats won	14	12
Seat change	▼3	▲3
Seats up	9	4
Races won	6	7
- Results: Republican hold Republican gain Democratic hold No election
Council President before election
Markus Winkler
Democratic
Elected Council President
Brent T. Ackerson
Democratic

The 2024 Louisville Metro Council election was held on November 5, 2024. The Republican and Democratic primary elections were held on May 21. Half of the council (all even-numbered seats) was up for election. Following the 2022 election, Democrats and Republicans held 17 and nine seats, respectively. The deadline for candidates to file was January 5, 2024. Democrats maintained their majority in the chamber, losing three seats.

== District 2 ==
Incumbent councilwoman Barbara E. Shanklin won reelection, defeating primary election challenger Latosha Harrison.

=== Democratic primary ===
==== Candidates ====
===== Nominee =====
- Barbara E. Shanklin, incumbent councilwoman

===== Eliminated in primary =====
- Latosha Harrison

==== Results ====
Democratic primary results
Party	Candidate	Votes	%
Democratic	Barbara E. Shanklin (incumbent)	1,015	55.1
Democratic	Latosha Harrison	828	44.9
Total votes		1,843	100.0

=== General election ===
==== Results ====
2024 Louisville Metro Council 2nd district election
Party	Candidate	Votes	%
Democratic	Barbara E. Shanklin (incumbent)	Unopposed	
Total votes		6,546	100.0
Democratic hold			

== District 4 ==
Incumbent councilman Jecorey Arthur did not seek reelection. He was succeeded by Democrat Ken Herndon.

=== Democratic primary ===
==== Candidates ====
===== Nominee =====
- Ken Herndon

===== Eliminated in primary =====
- Carol Clark
- Joshua Alexander Crowder
- Joseph "Jody" Dahmer
- Mary K. Hall
- Dino Johnson
- Demetrius M. McDowell Sr.
- Stan Moore
- Dennisha Rivers
- Bridgett Smith

==== Results ====
Democratic primary results
Party	Candidate	Votes	%
Democratic	Ken Herndon	552	28.3
Democratic	Demetrius M. McDowell Sr.	464	23.8
Democratic	Joshua Alexander Crowder	267	13.7
Democratic	Stan Moore	160	8.2
Democratic	Dennisha Rivers	138	7.1
Democratic	Bridgett Smith	126	6.5
Democratic	Mary K. Hall	98	5.0
Democratic	Dino Johnson	67	3.4
Democratic	Carol Clark	42	2.2
Democratic	Joseph "Jody" Dahmer	39	2.0
Total votes		1,953	100.0

=== General election ===
==== Results ====
2024 Louisville Metro Council 4th district election
Party	Candidate	Votes	%
Democratic	Ken Herndon	Unopposed	
Total votes		6,852	100.0
Democratic hold			

== District 6 ==
Incumbent Democratic councilman Phillip "Phil" Baker was defeated for renomination by J. P. Lyninger.

=== Democratic primary ===
==== Candidates ====
===== Nominee =====
- J. P. Lyninger

===== Eliminated in primary =====
- Phillip "Phil" Baker, incumbent councilman
- Kate Dittmeier Holm

==== Results ====
Democratic primary results
Party	Candidate	Votes	%
Democratic	J. P. Lyninger	1,169	48.7
Democratic	Phillip "Phil" Baker (incumbent)	708	29.5
Democratic	Kate Dittmeier Holm	524	21.8
Total votes		2,401	100.0

=== General election ===
==== Results ====
2024 Louisville Metro Council 6th district election
Party	Candidate	Votes	%
Democratic	J. P. Lyninger	Unopposed	
Total votes		7,083	100.0
Democratic hold			

== District 8 ==
Incumbent councilman Ben Reno-Weber won reelection, defeating primary election challenger Taylor McGovern-U'Sellis.

=== Democratic primary ===
==== Candidates ====
===== Nominee =====
- Ben Reno-Weber, incumbent councilman

===== Eliminated in primary =====
- Taylor McGovern-U'Sellis

==== Results ====
Democratic primary results
Party	Candidate	Votes	%
Democratic	Ben Reno-Weber (incumbent)	3,800	61.7
Democratic	Taylor McGovern-U'Sellis	2,359	38.3
Total votes		6,159	100.0

=== General election ===
==== Results ====
2024 Louisville Metro Council 8th district election
Party	Candidate	Votes	%
Democratic	Ben Reno-Weber (incumbent)	Unopposed	
Total votes		15,282	100.0
Democratic hold			

== District 10 ==
Incumbent councilman Pat Mulvihill did not seek reelection. He was succeeded by Democrat Josie Raymond.

=== Democratic primary ===
==== Candidates ====
===== Nominee =====
- Josie Raymond, member of the Kentucky House of Representatives (2019–2025)

=== General election ===
==== Results ====
2024 Louisville Metro Council 10th district election
Party	Candidate	Votes	%
Democratic	Josie Raymond	Unopposed	
Total votes		9,309	100.0
Democratic hold			

== District 12 ==
Incumbent councilman Rick Blackwell was defeated for reelection by Republican Jonathan "JJ" Joseph.

=== Democratic primary ===
==== Candidates ====
===== Nominee =====
- Rick Blackwell, incumbent councilman

=== Republican primary ===
==== Candidates ====
===== Nominee =====
- Jonathan "JJ" Joseph

===== Eliminated in primary =====
- Jennifer Fox Brown
- Ryan Thompson

==== Results ====
Republican primary results
Party	Candidate	Votes	%
Republican	Jonathan "JJ" Joseph	726	59.1
Republican	Ryan Thompson	289	23.5
Republican	Jennifer Fox Brown	213	17.3
Total votes		1,228	100.0

=== General election ===
==== Results ====
2024 Louisville Metro Council 12th district election
Party	Candidate	Votes	%
Republican	Jonathan "JJ" Joseph	6,240	50.4
Democratic	Rick Blackwell (incumbent)	6,149	49.6
Total votes		12,389	100.0
Republican gain from Democratic			

== District 14 ==
Incumbent councilwoman Cindi Fowler was defeated for reelection by Republican Crystal Bast.

=== Democratic primary ===
==== Candidates ====
===== Nominee =====
- Cindi Fowler, incumbent councilwoman

===== Eliminated in primary =====
- Autumn Lockhart
- Neal A. Robertson

==== Results ====
Democratic primary results
Party	Candidate	Votes	%
Democratic	Cindi Fowler (incumbent)	934	70.6
Democratic	Neal A. Robertson	199	15.0
Democratic	Autumn Lockhart	190	14.4
Total votes		1,323	100.0

=== Republican primary ===
==== Candidates ====
===== Nominee =====
- Crystal Bast

===== Eliminated in primary =====
- Crystal Ann Barajas

==== Results ====
Republican primary results
Party	Candidate	Votes	%
Republican	Crystal Bast	807	70.7
Republican	Crystal Ann Barajas	334	29.3
Total votes		1,141	100.0

=== General election ===
==== Results ====
2024 Louisville Metro Council 14th district election
Party	Candidate	Votes	%
Republican	Crystal Bast	6,351	51.6
Democratic	Cindi Fowler (incumbent)	5,952	48.4
Total votes		12,303	100.0
Republican gain from Democratic			

== District 16 ==
Incumbent councilman Scott W. Reed won reelection, defeating Democratic candidate Matthew Golden.

=== Democratic primary ===
==== Candidates ====
===== Nominee =====
- Matthew Golden

=== Republican primary ===
==== Candidates ====
===== Nominee =====
- Scott W. Reed, incumbent councilman

=== General election ===
==== Results ====
2024 Louisville Metro Council 16th district election
Party	Candidate	Votes	%
Republican	Scott W. Reed (incumbent)	11,140	54.0
Democratic	Matthew Golden	9,507	46.0
Total votes		20,647	100.0
Republican hold			

== District 18 ==
Incumbent councilwoman Marilyn Parker won reelection, defeating primary and general election challengers.

=== Democratic primary ===
==== Candidates ====
===== Nominee =====
- Mera Kathryn Corlett

=== Republican primary ===
==== Candidates ====
===== Nominee =====
- Marilyn Parker, incumbent councilwoman

===== Eliminated in primary =====
- Bonnie Jung

==== Results ====
Republican primary results
Party	Candidate	Votes	%
Republican	Marilyn Parker (incumbent)	1,653	71.8
Republican	Bonnie Jung	650	28.2
Total votes		2,303	100.0

=== General election ===
==== Results ====
2024 Louisville Metro Council 18th district election
Party	Candidate	Votes	%
Republican	Marilyn Parker (incumbent)	9,993	54.1
Democratic	Mera Kathryn Corlett	8,465	45.9
Total votes		18,458	100.0
Republican hold			

== District 20 ==
Incumbent councilman Stuart Benson won reelection, defeating primary and general election challengers.

=== Democratic primary ===
==== Candidates ====
===== Nominee =====
- Marita A. Willis

=== Republican primary ===
==== Candidates ====
===== Nominee =====
- Stuart Benson, incumbent councilman

===== Eliminated in primary =====
- Brian Abrams

==== Results ====
Republican primary results
Party	Candidate	Votes	%
Republican	Stuart Benson (incumbent)	1,112	55.6
Republican	Brian Abrams	887	44.4
Total votes		1,999	100.0

=== General election ===
==== Results ====
2024 Louisville Metro Council 20th district election
Party	Candidate	Votes	%
Republican	Stuart Benson (incumbent)	10,225	60.7%
Democratic	Marita A. Willis	6,634	39.3
Total votes		16,859	100.0
Republican hold			

== District 22 ==
Incumbent councilman Robin Engel did not seek reelection. He was succeeded by Republican Kevin D. Bratcher.

=== Democratic primary ===
==== Candidates ====
===== Nominee =====
- Rasean L. Crawley

=== Republican primary ===
==== Candidates ====
===== Nominee =====
- Kevin D. Bratcher, state representative from the 29th district (1997–2025)

===== Eliminated in primary =====
- Robert John Zoeller Jr.

==== Results ====
Republican primary results
Party	Candidate	Votes	%
Republican	Kevin D. Bratcher	1,792	87.7
Republican	Robert John Zoeller Jr.	251	12.3
Total votes		2,043	100.0

=== General election ===
==== Results ====
2024 Louisville Metro Council 22nd district election
Party	Candidate	Votes	%
Republican	Kevin D. Bratcher	10,025	60.7
Democratic	Rasean L. Crawley	6,485	39.3
Total votes		16,510	100.0
Republican hold			

== District 24 ==
Incumbent councilwoman Madonna Flood did not seek reelection. She was succeeded by Republican Ginny Mulvey-Woolridge.

=== Democratic primary ===
==== Candidates ====
===== Nominee =====
- Tyra Thomas-Walker

===== Eliminated in primary =====
- Ryan Vittitow

==== Results ====
Democratic primary results
Party	Candidate	Votes	%
Democratic	Tyra Thomas-Walker	762	58.6
Democratic	Ryan Vittitow	538	41.4
Total votes		1,300	100.0

=== Republican primary ===
==== Candidates ====
===== Nominee =====
- Ginny Mulvey-Woolridge

=== General election ===
==== Results ====
2024 Louisville Metro Council 24th district election
Party	Candidate	Votes	%
Republican	Ginny Mulvey-Woolridge	6,138	51.1
Democratic	Tyra Thomas-Walker	5,868	48.9
Total votes		12,006	100.0
Republican gain from Democratic			

== District 26 ==
Incumbent councilman Brent T. Ackerson won reelection unopposed.

=== Democratic primary ===
==== Candidates ====
===== Nominee =====
- Brent T. Ackerson, incumbent councilman

=== General election ===
==== Results ====
2024 Louisville Metro Council 26th district election
Party	Candidate	Votes	%
Democratic	Brent T. Ackerson (incumbent)	Unopposed	
Total votes		10,511	100.0
Democratic hold			

== See also ==
- 2024 Kentucky elections
