= Louisville City Hall =

- Louisville City Hall Complex
- U.S. National Register of Historic Places
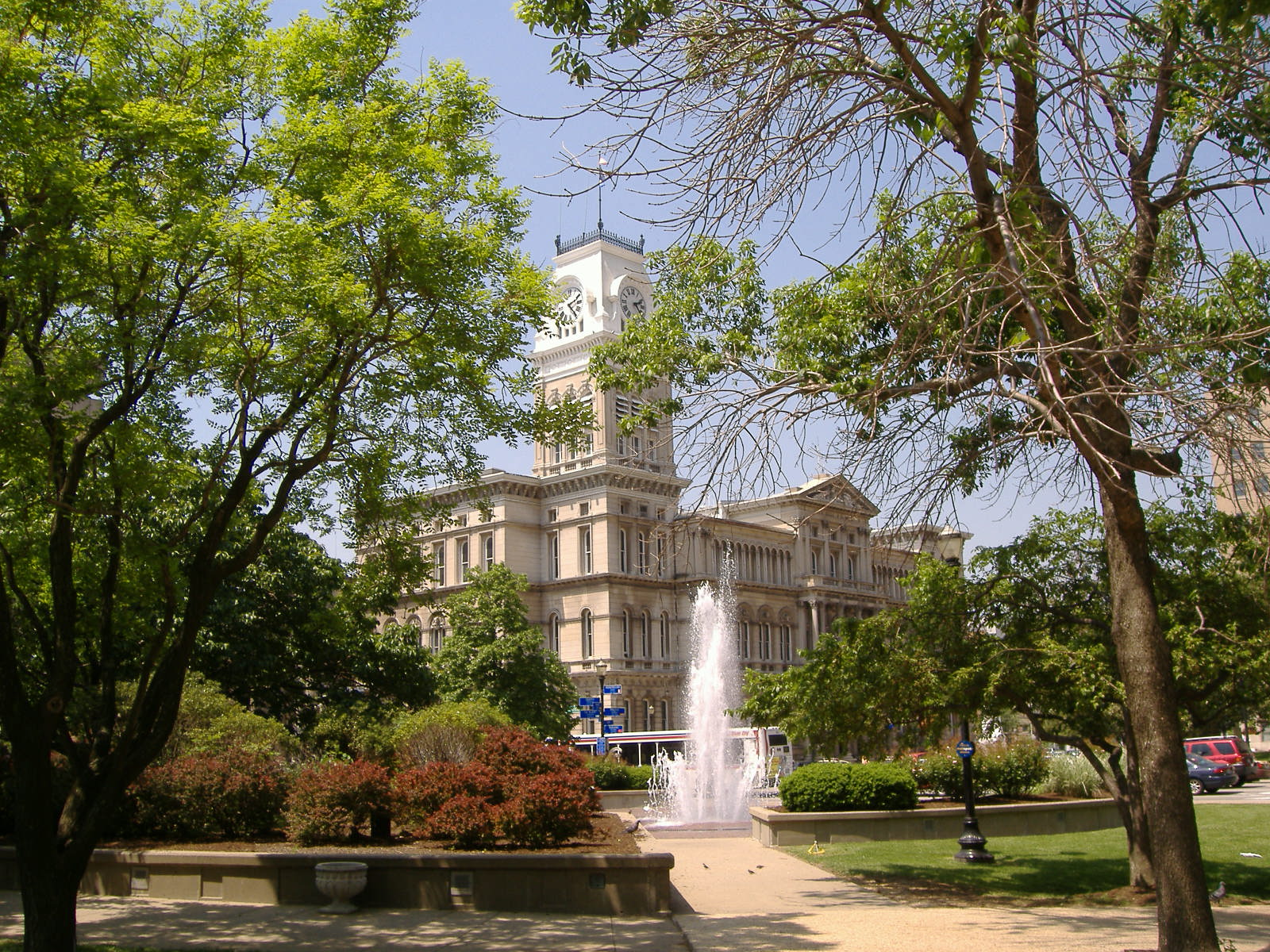
- Location: Louisville, Kentucky
- Coordinates: 38°15′17″N 85°45′38″W
- Built: 1873; 153 years ago
- Architect: Multiple
- Architectural style: Beaux Arts; Second Empire; Romanesque Revival
- NRHP reference No.: 76000905
- Added to NRHP: September 1, 1976

Louisville City Hall is a registered historic building in Louisville, Kentucky, placed on the National Register of Historic Places in 1976. Completed in 1873 to house the Louisville city government, the structure is located at 601 West Jefferson Street in what became Downtown Louisville, the center of the city's civic district.

Since the merger of the former City of Louisville with Jefferson County, Kentucky, it now primarily houses the offices and chambers of the Louisville Metro Council. The former Jefferson County Courthouse, now known as Louisville Metro Hall, is now primarily home to the offices of the metro mayor of Louisville.

== History ==
The site was already Louisville's civic center before the City Hall was built. The first log courthouse was built across the street in 1784, and a brick courthouse stood on the site from 1811 to 1837. Prior to the construction of the City Hall, city government officials shared space with the courthouse.

Before the City Hall's construction, there was no dedicated building for city government, whose officials used space in the county courthouses. The plan was selected by way of a design competition held in 1867 with the winner receiving $500. The contest was won in April 1867 by local architect John Andrewartha and C.S. Mergell. In late summer 1870, the final plans for City Hall construction were made by Andrewartha, who was named managing architect, and architectural firm C.L. Stancliff and Co. The remaining government buildings were demolished before ground was broken on the city hall in 1870. Louisville General Council selected City engineer I.M. St. John to supervise the project.

Indiana Limestone, from White River quarries near Salem, Indiana was used. Construction took place between 1870 and 1873 at a final cost of $464,778. The exterior has been renovated several times but remains unchanged, while the interior has been completely remodeled several times.

A Greco-Roman annex building was built just west of City Hall in 1909. Cornelius Curtin designed it. An 1891 firehouse, the next building down Jefferson Street, was integrated into the complex in 1937. The building housed the city's tax collectors and quickly acquired the name "Sinking Fund Building". By the late 20th century it housed the Inspections, Permits and Licenses Department, which moved out in 2004. All three buildings were added to the National Register of Historic Places as the City Hall Complex in 1976.

== Architecture ==
The building was a striking blend of Italianate and Second Empire styles, both popular at the time in civic buildings. Designs on the building represented the city's outlook in the post-Civil War era, which was very optimistic. The pediment over the main entrance features a relief of the city seal and a train steaming forward past Southern flora with the inscription, "Progress, 1871". Other engravings, over the tympana of the side windows, depict livestock heads, representing the importance of agriculture in Louisville's early history.

It has three full stories had a raised basement. The most prominent feature is the 195-foot four-faced clock tower with mansard roof, not completed until 1876 after an earlier one burned in 1875. The tower included a three-ton bell which rang until 1964, when the clock broke. It was repaired in 1968 but broke in the 1970s. It was repaired in 1991.

== Gallery ==
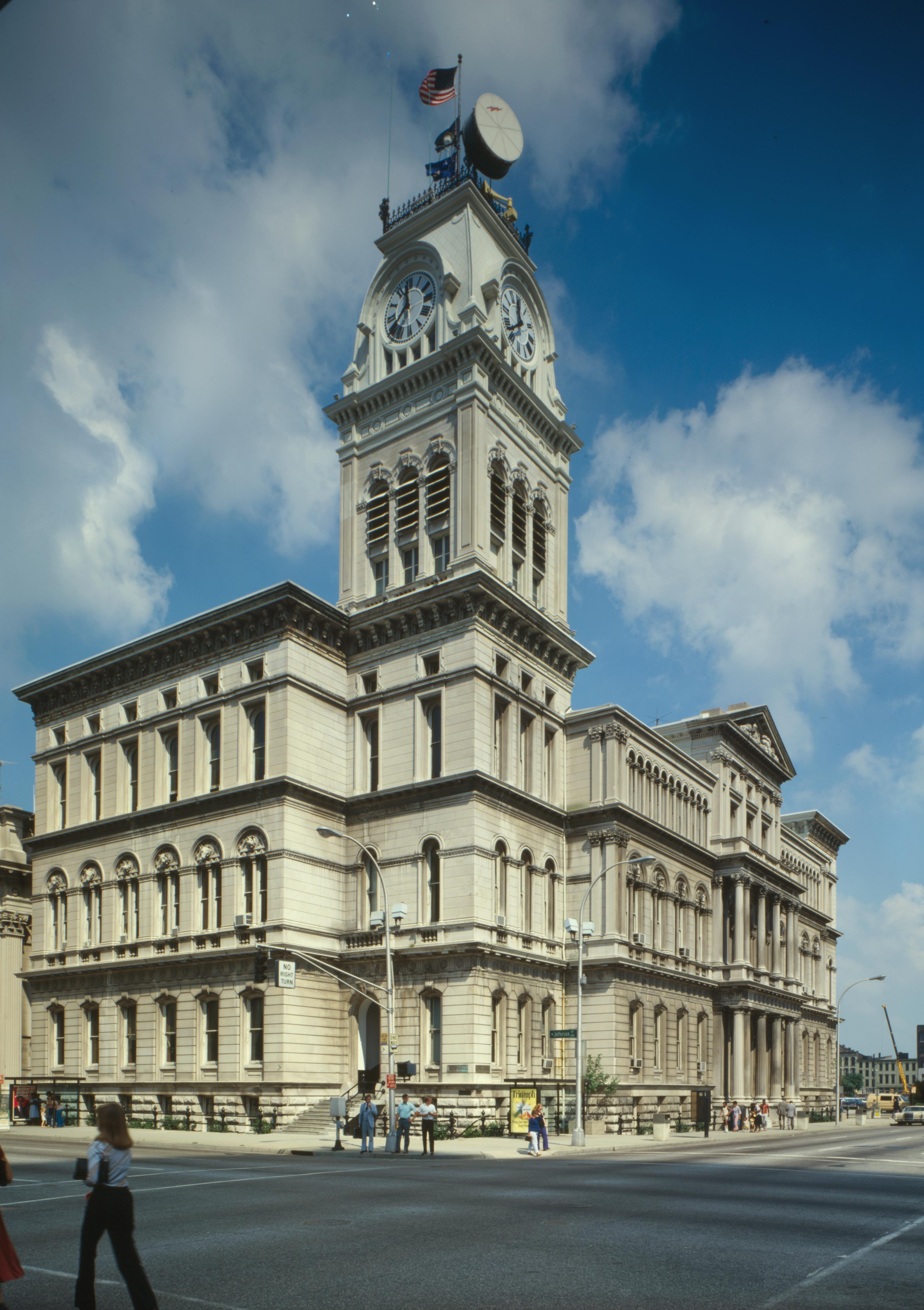
View from Jefferson Square

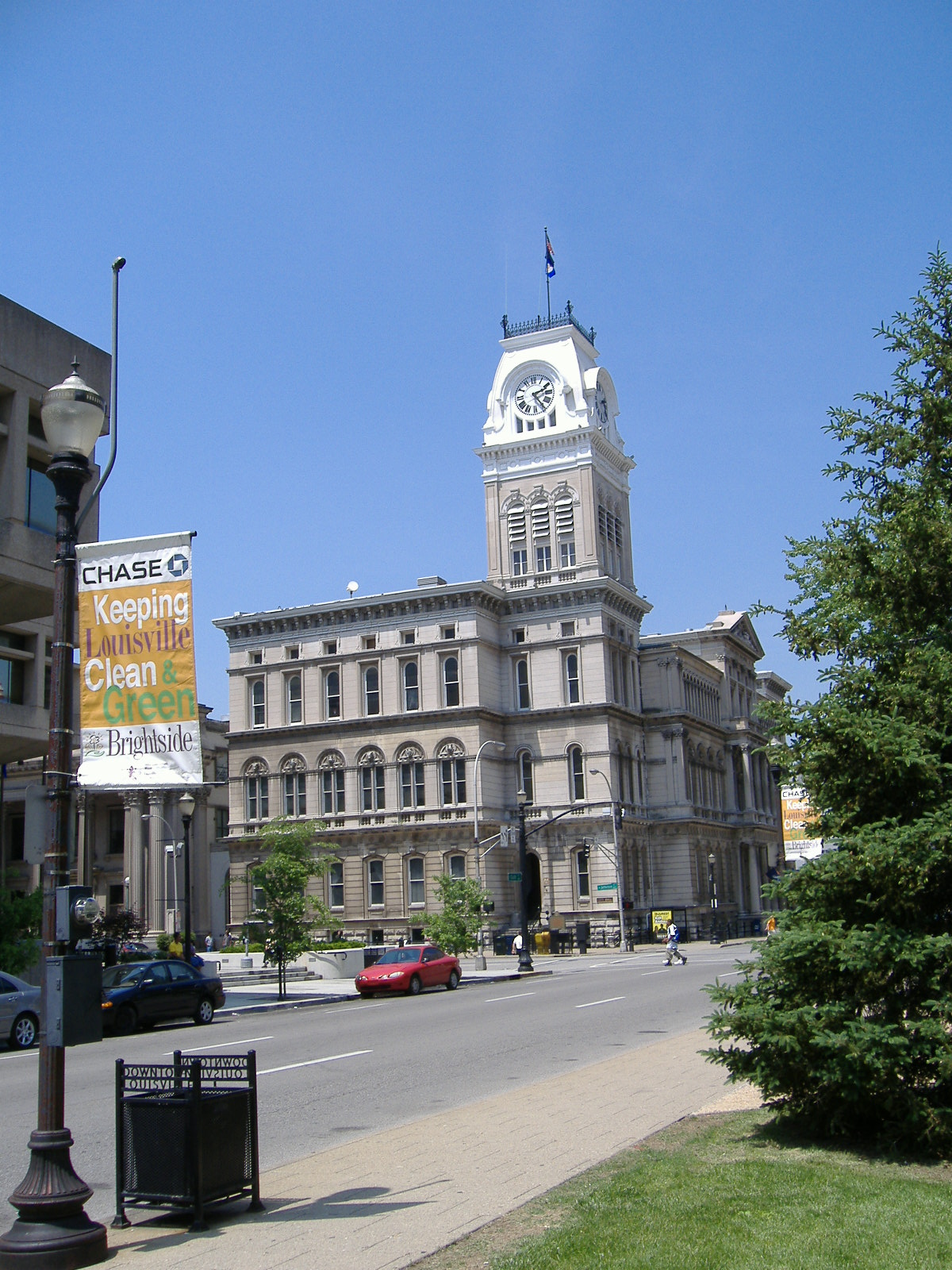
View from further south on 6th Street

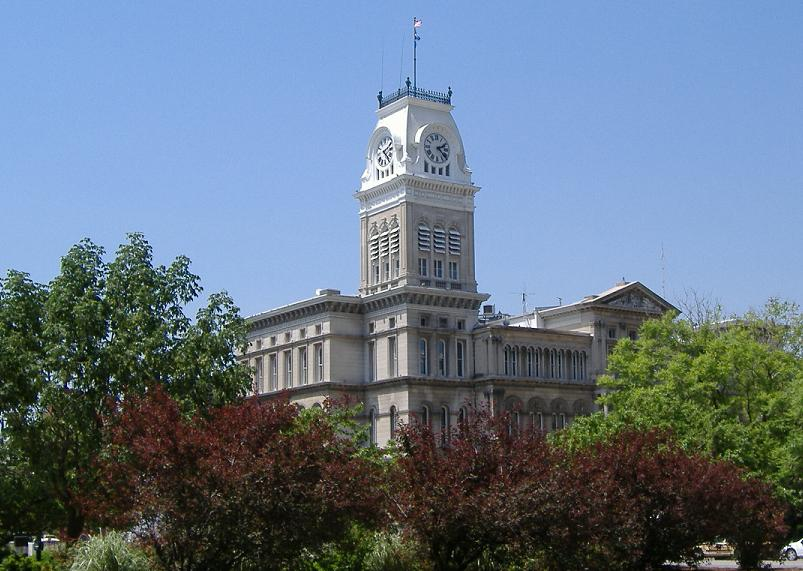
A view from further southeast of the Hall

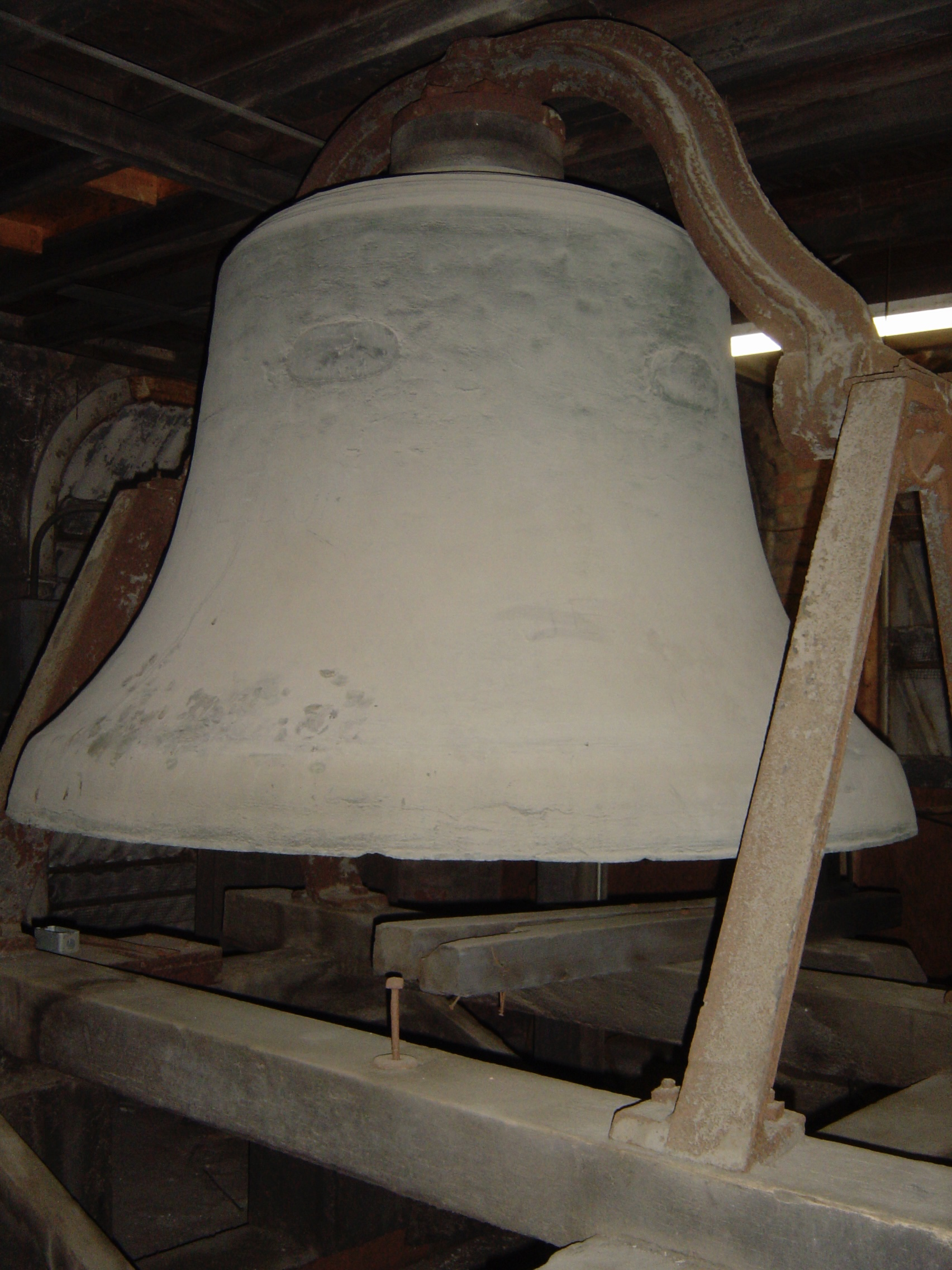
Louisville City Hall Bell

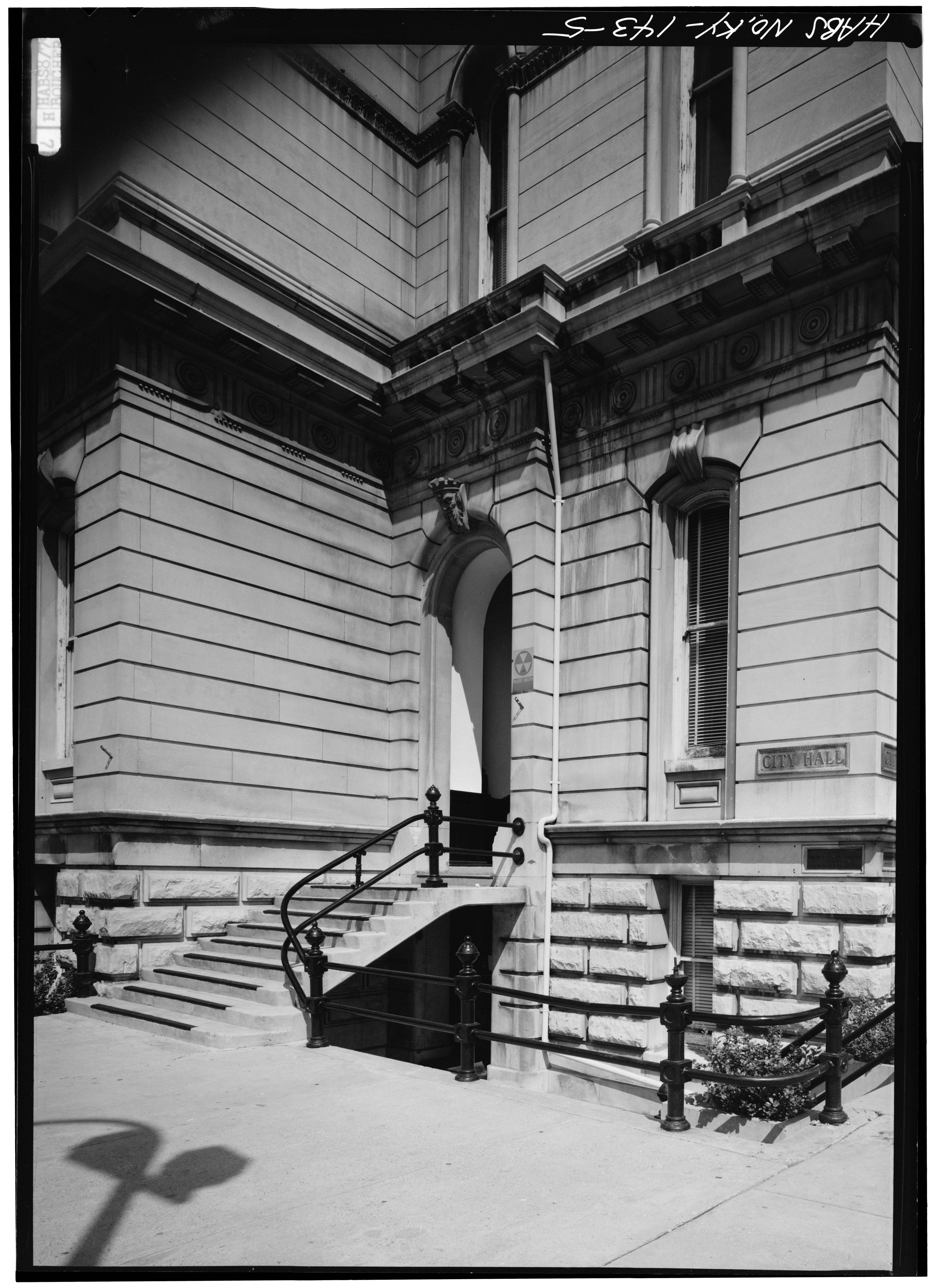
Side Entrance, South Elevation, from Jefferson Street

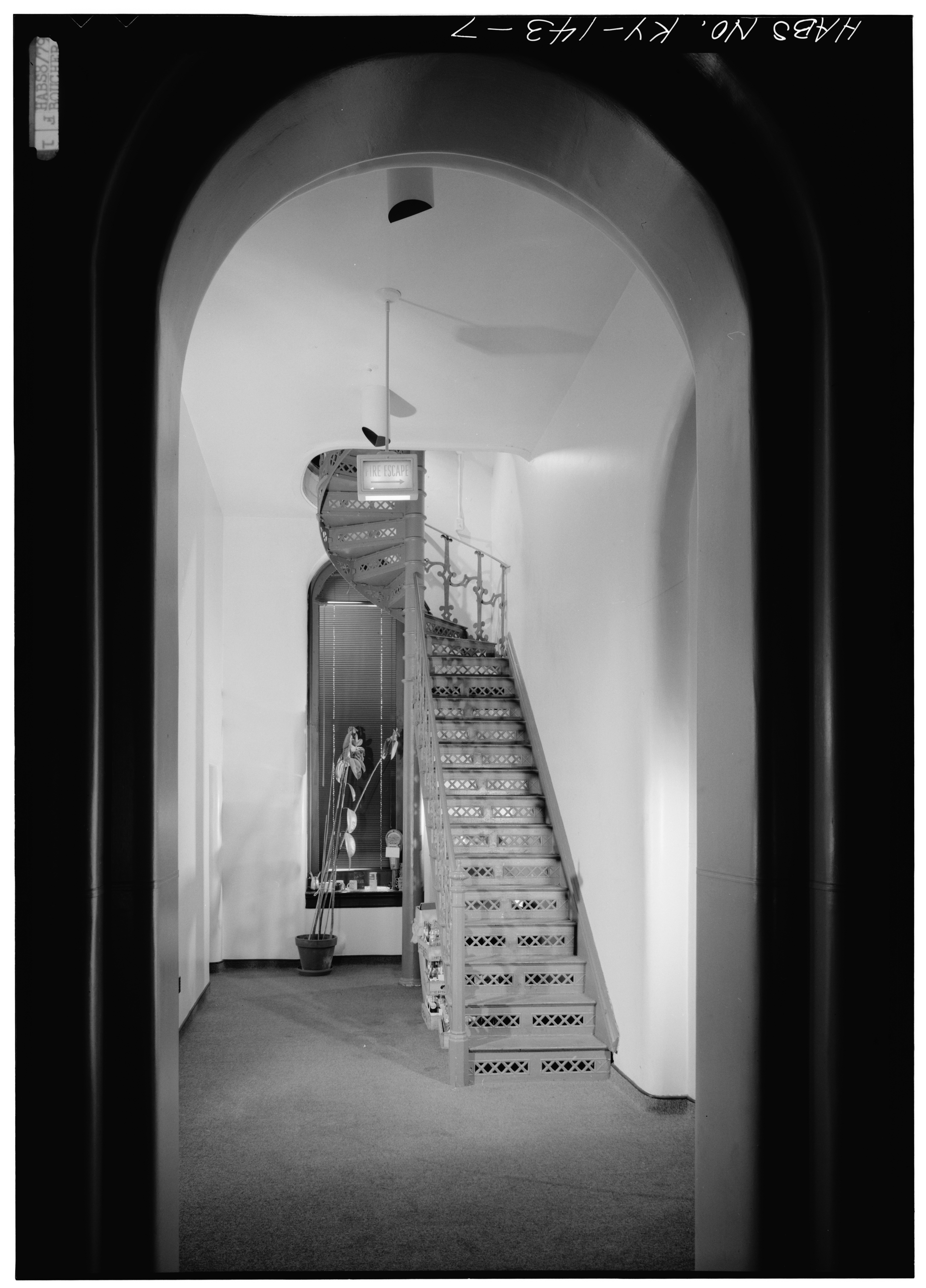
Cast Iron Staircase, Leading from Third Floor to Bell tower

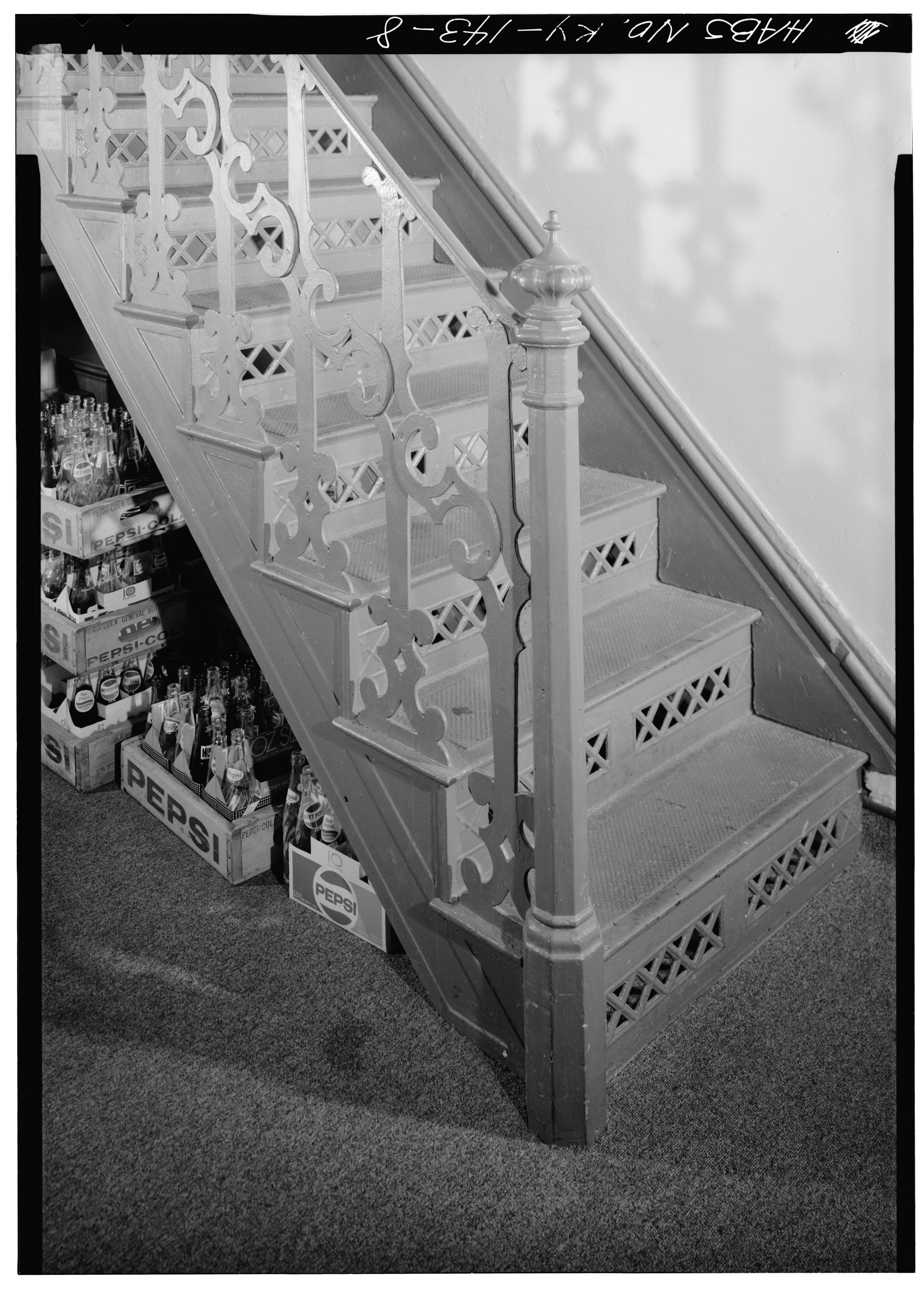
Detail of Cast Iron Staircase, Third Floor

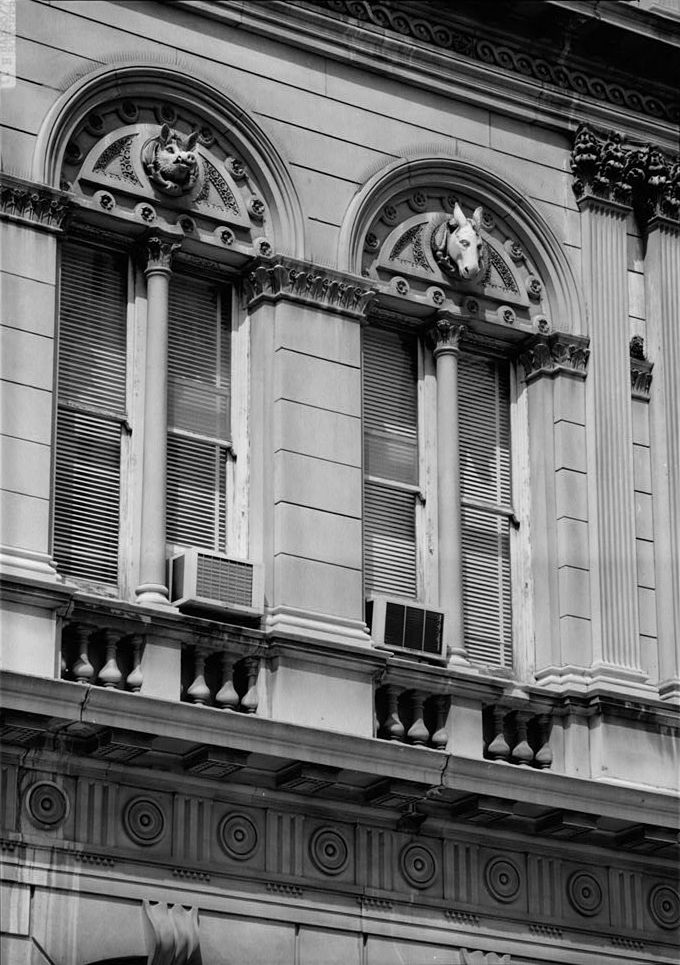
Detail of window sculptures
