= Dave Stengel =

American politician

Commonwealth's Attorney of the 30th Kentucky Circuit Court
- In office November 1996 – January 7, 2013
- Preceded by: Marc S. Murphy
- Succeeded by: Thomas B. Wine

Member of the Kentucky House of Representatives from the 29th district
- In office January 1, 1993 – November 1996
- Preceded by: Lindy Casebier
- Succeeded by: Kevin Bratcher

Personal details
- Born: September 10, 1946 (age 79)
- Party: Democratic

Raymond David Stengel (born September 10, 1946) is an American politician from Kentucky who was a member of the Kentucky House of Representatives from 1993 to 1996. Stengel was first elected in 1992 after incumbent representative Lindy Casebier ran for the Kentucky Senate. He did not seek reelection in 1996, instead running for Commonwealth's Attorney for Jefferson County, a position he held until 2012. Stengel unsuccessfully ran for the 29th district again in 2014 and 2016.
