= Lindy Casebier =

American politician

Secretary of the Kentucky Tourism, Arts and Heritage Cabinet
- Incumbent
- Assumed office February 2023
- Governor: Andy Beshear
- Preceded by: Mike Berry

Member of the Kentucky Senate from the 7th district
- In office January 1, 1993 – January 1, 2005
- Preceded by: Bill Quinlan
- Succeeded by: Julian Carroll (redistricting)

Member of the Kentucky House of Representatives from the 29th district
- In office January 1, 1987 – January 1, 1993
- Preceded by: Al Bennett
- Succeeded by: Dave Stengel

Personal details
- Born: December 27, 1960 (age 65) Louisville, Kentucky
- Party: Republican

Lindell E. Casebier (born December 27, 1960) is an American politician who served in the Kentucky House of Representatives from the 29th district from 1987 to 1993 and in the Kentucky Senate from the 7th district from 1993 to 2005. In 2023, Casebier was appointed by governor Andy Beshear to be secretary of the Tourism, Arts and Heritage Cabinet.
