= David W. Tandy =

American politician (born 1972)

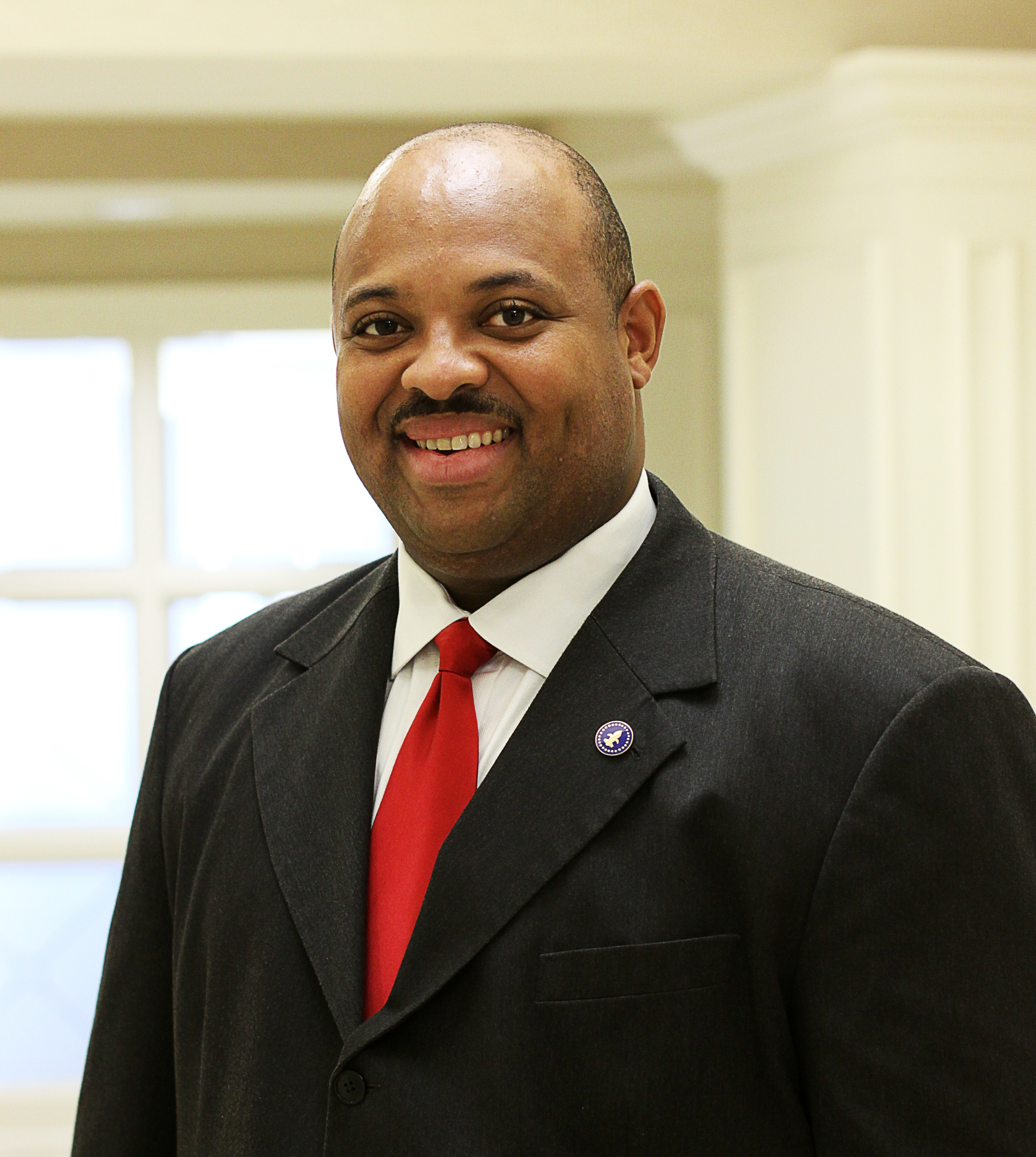

Member of Louisville Metro Council from the 4th District
- In office April 14, 2005 – January 1, 2017
- Preceded by: Willie Bright
- Succeeded by: Barbara Sexton Smith

President of the Louisville Metro Council
- In office 2015–2016
- Preceded by: Jim King
- Succeeded by: David Yates

President of the Louisville Metro Council
- In office 2009–2010
- Preceded by: Jim King
- Succeeded by: Tom Owen

Personal details
- Born: December 18, 1972 (age 53) Owensboro, Kentucky, U.S.
- Party: Democratic Party
- Education: Vanderbilt University (BS); University of Kentucky (JD)
- Profession: Attorney
- Website: Official website

David Warren Tandy is a retired American Democratic Party politician in Louisville, Kentucky, he served as a member of the Louisville Metro Council, representing District 4. Originally appointed by the Metro Council to fill the vacancy left by the death of former councilman Willie Bright, Tandy served from April 14, 2005, until he decided to not run for reelection in 2016. Tandy served as interim president of the Louisville Metro Council from 2015 to 2016, temporarily filling the vacancy left by the death of then council president Jim King. He was succeeded as president by David Yates.

== Biography ==
Tandy was born December 12, 1972, in Owensboro, Kentucky. As a student athlete, Tandy played as a defensive tackle for the Owensboro High's Red Devils. In 1991, Tandy was selected to play for the KY–TN All-star game. That same year Tandy began his matriculation at Vanderbilt University on an athletic scholarship. During his matriculation at the university, Tandy served as president of the Black Student Alliance, was a founding member of the Voices of Praise Gospel Choir, and was elected to serve on the Honors Council. Tandy graduated from Vanderbilt's Peabody College in 1995 with a Bachelor of Science in Human and Organizational Development.

== Political career ==
In 2000, Tandy served as treasurer for the Kentucky Democratic Party, the youngest person and second African-American to serve his party as a state official.

During the 2000 presidential election, Tandy was the Tennessee state co-chair of GoreNet. GoreNet was a group that supported the Al Gore campaign with a focus on grassroots and online organizing as well as hosting small dollar donor events.

Tandy was elected by the Metro Council to serve as District Four councilman on April 14, 2005. He was re-elected in November 2006. In January 2009, he was unanimously elected to serve as the seventh president of the Louisville Metro Council. In the 2010 mayoral race, Tandy came in second place in the Democratic primary.

Following the death of Council President Jim King in January 2015, Tandy was selected to fill the unexpired term. He is the second member of the Metro Council, after King, to serve as president for more than one term.

== Professional career ==
Tandy was an attorney with the firm of Stoll-Keenon-Ogden. His areas of practice included public finance, corporate law and government relations. He left the firm in 2008 to actively campaign to become the next mayor of Louisville; eventually claiming second place in the primary election.

In 2016 Tandy returned to private practice after his period as Louisville Metro Council President, joining Bingham Greenebaum Doll LLP as an attorney and lobbyist. His practice areas included corporate, emerging business and public financing solutions.

Tandy has served as the Government Relations Director for the American Cancer Society, Mid-South Division, Inc. and ran the law firm of Tandy & Associates. In addition he has practiced law with the firms of Sheffer-Hutchinson-Kinney and Woodward, Hobson, & Fulton in Kentucky; Ortale, Kelley, Herbert, & Crawford in Nashville, Tennessee; and worked in the Washington D.C. Office of former United States Senator Wendell H. Ford.

== Community involvement ==
Tandy's community involvement includes serving as an executive board member of the Louisville Branch NAACP Executive Committee and the Kentucky YMCA-Youth Association, Inc. In addition he is a former board member of the Louisville Metro Police Merit Review Board and the Louisville Metro Parks Advisory Commission. Councilman Tandy also served as the first president of the Louisville Urban League Young Professionals Organization. He was also the board chair of the Kentucky Science Center.
