= Occupational privilege tax =

Various state and local taxing authorities in the US require an employer or the employee to withhold and remit a tax on the wages paid to an employee. Some states require both the employer and employee to remit a portion of the total occupational privilege tax (OPT), while others only require one or the other to do so. As such, it is a type of payroll tax. The genesis of this tax is the state's claim in recovering accrued benefits provided to the taxpayer in enabling them to become employed and allowing for the state or municipality to further provide for taxpayers in the future.
