= Kevin Bratcher =

American politician (born 1961)

Kevin D. Bratcher
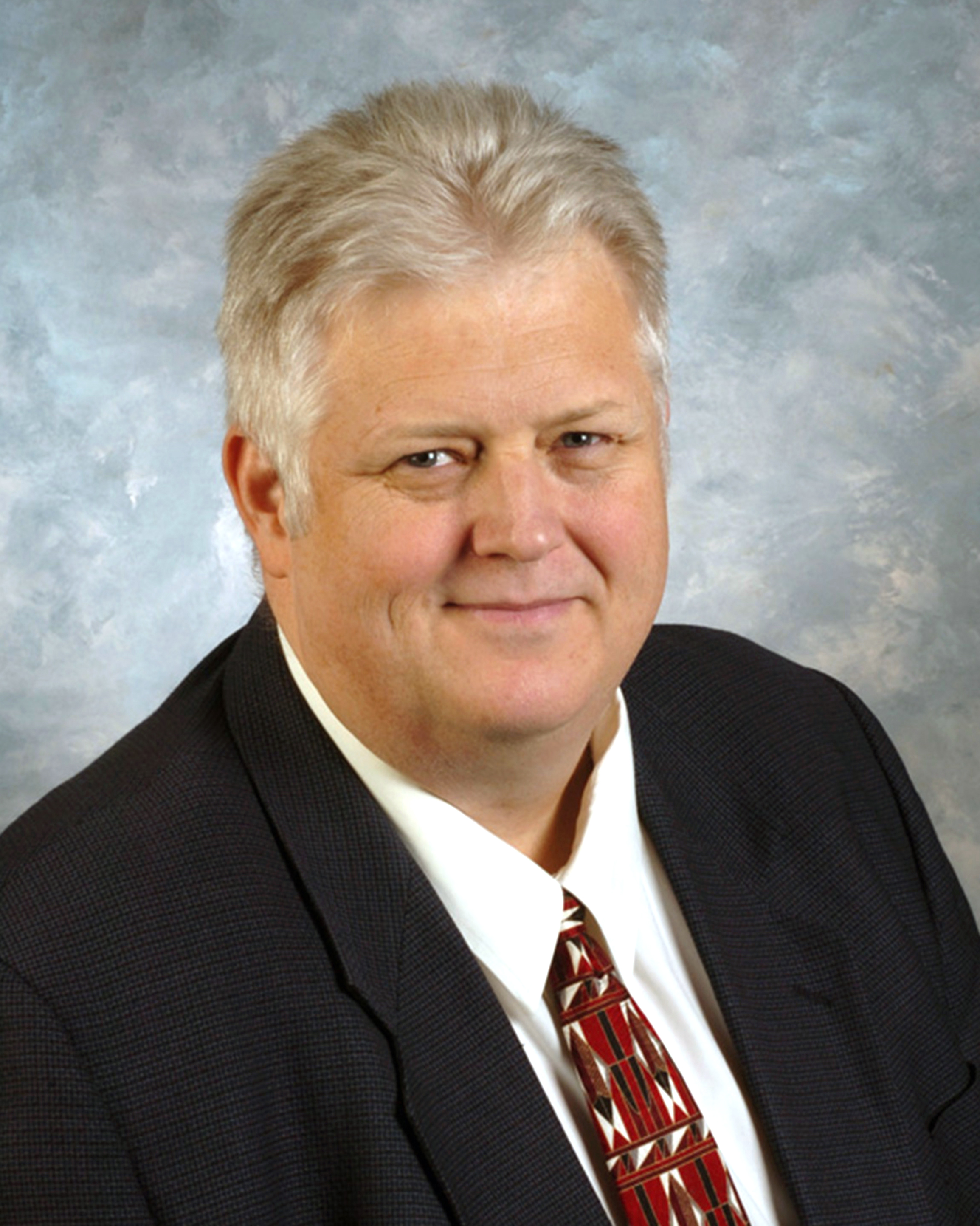

Member of the Louisville Metro Council from the 22nd district
- Incumbent
- Assumed office January 6, 2025
- Preceded by: Robin Engel

Majority Whip of the Kentucky House of Representatives
- In office January 3, 2017 – January 8, 2019
- Preceded by: Johnny Bell
- Succeeded by: Chad McCoy

Member of the Kentucky House of Representatives from the 29th district
- In office January 1, 1997 – January 1, 2025
- Preceded by: Dave Stengel
- Succeeded by: Chris Lewis

Personal details
- Born: April 17, 1961 (age 65) Louisville, Kentucky
- Party: Republican
- Education: Louisville Technical Institute; Embry–Riddle Aeronautical University; Webster University

Military service
- Branch/service: United States Navy
- Years of service: 1985–1991

Kevin Dale Bratcher (born April 17, 1961) is an American politician who served as a Republican member of the Kentucky House of Representatives from 1997 to 2025. In 2016, Bratcher became the first Republican House Majority Whip in Kentucky history.

Bratcher did not seek reelection to the Kentucky House in 2024, and instead ran for the 22nd district seat on the Louisville Metro Council.

Kevin's cousin, Steve Bratcher, is currently a member of the Kentucky House of Representatives from Kentucky's 25th House district.

== Background ==
Bratcher graduated from Shawnee High School before earning his BS from Embry–Riddle Aeronautical University, his MA in media communications from Webster University and his AAS in Mechanical Engineering Technology from the Louisville Technical Institute.

== Elections ==
- 1996 Bratcher won the November 5, 1996 General election against Democratic nominee John Flood after incumbent representative Dave Stengel retired to run for Commonwealth's Attorney.
- 1998 Bratcher won the November 3, 1998 General election against Democratic nominee Joyce McClain.
- 2000 Bratcher and returning 1998 Democratic challenger Joyce McClain, setting up a rematch; Bratcher won the November 7, 2000 General election with 8,915 votes (57.3%) against McClain.
- 2002 Bratcher won both the 2002 Republican Primary and the November 5, 2002 General election, winning with 12,008 votes.
- 2004 Bratcher was challenged by Eastern High School Principal, James Sexton in the 2004 Republican Primary, winning with (74.1%) and won the November 2, 2004 General election with 15,407 votes (62.8%) against Democratic nominee Bruce Roberts.
- 2006 Bratcher won the 2006 Republican Primary and the November 7, 2006 General election, winning with 13,411 votes.
- 2008 Bratcher ran for the 2008 Republican Primary and won the November 4, 2008 General election with 16,630 votes (58.8%) against Democratic nominee James Sexton, who had been his Republican Primary challenger in 2004. Bratcher also won the November 2, 2010 General election with 15,019 votes (68.3%) against Democratic nominee Dustin Wilcher.
- 2010 Bratcher won the 2010 election against Democratic candidate Dustin Wilcher, winning with 15,019 votes (68.3%)
- 2012 Bratcher was unopposed in the 2012 Republican Primary and the 2012 Kentucky House of Representatives election, winning with 21,143 votes.
- 2014 Bratcher won the 2014 Kentucky House of Representatives election against previous seat holder and Democratic candidate Dave Stengel, winning with 8,892 votes (52.5%).
- 2016 Bratcher was unopposed in both the 2016 Republican primary, and the 2016 Kentucky House of Representatives election, winning with 17,535 votes.
- 2018 Bratcher won the 2018 Kentucky House of Representatives election against Democratic candidate Ronel Brown, winning with 10,570 votes (53.3%).
- 2020 Bratcher won the 2020 Kentucky House of Representatives election against Democratic candidate Suzanne Kugler, winning with 15,298 votes (55.6%).
- 2022 Bratcher was unopposed in the 2022 Republican primary. Initially, previous Democratic candidate Suzanne Kugler filed to run against Bratcher, however her residence was included in the 2022 Kentucky redistricting. Matthew Pfaadt filed to replace Kugler as the Democratic nominee, however he was disqualified for failing to meet the party registration requirements. Finally, Ann Federspiel Sermersheim attempted to file to be the Democratic nominee, but was denied by Secretary of State Michael Adams due to the filing deadline having already passed; she chose to run as a write-in candidate instead. Bratcher won the 2022 Kentucky House of Representatives election against Democratic write-in candidate Ann Federspiel Sermersheim, winning with 11,389 votes (99.4%).
- 2024 Bratcher chose not to seek reelection to the Kentucky House of Representatives, and instead ran to represent District 22 on the Louisville Metro Council. Bratcher won the 2024 Republican primary against Robert Zoeller, winning with 1,792 votes (87.7%), and in the general election, Bratcher defeated Democratic candidate Rasean Crawley (Bratcher 61% Crawley 39%).
