= Government of Louisville, Kentucky =

Executive and legislative branches of Louisville, Kentucky

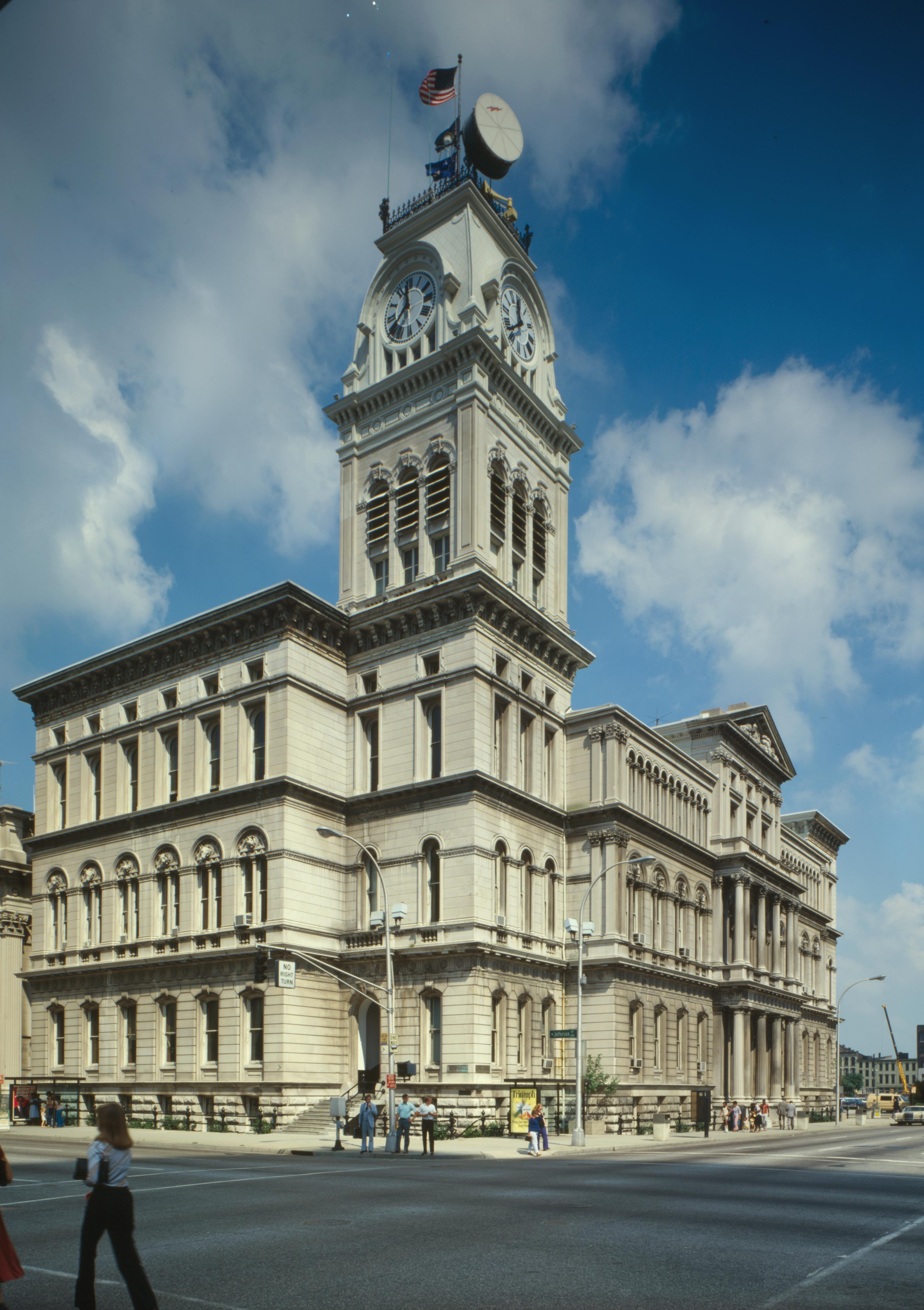
Louisville City Hall in Downtown Louisville. It houses the offices and chambers of the Mayor of Louisville and the Louisville Metro Council.

The government of Louisville, Kentucky, headquartered at Louisville City Hall in Downtown Louisville, is organized under Chapter 67C of the Kentucky Revised Statutes as a first-class city in the state of Kentucky. Created after the merger of the governments of Louisville, Kentucky and Jefferson County, Kentucky, the city/county government is organized under a mayor-council system. The Mayor is elected to four-year terms and is responsible for the administration of city government. The Louisville Metro Council is a unicameral body consisting of 26 members, each elected from a geographic district, normally for four-year terms. The Mayor is limited to a two consecutive term limit, while members of the Louisville Metro Council are not term limited.

== Executive branch ==
The Executive Branch of the Louisville Metro Government is led by the Mayor, and contains approximately two dozen distinct agencies. Each agency is led by either a Director or Commissioner, both of whom are appointed by the Mayor. The agencies are grouped into nine distinct entities, referred to as departments. Each Department is led by a Chief, who is appointed by, and reports to, the Mayor.

=== Mayor of Louisville Metro ===
The Mayor is the chief executive officer of the city and a magistrate. The mayor's office administers all city services, public property, police and fire protection, most public agencies, and enforces all city and state laws within the Louisville Metropolitan area. Under the Kentucky Revised Statutes, they are responsible for the appointment and removal of all unelected officers and shall "broadly exercise all executive and administrative powers" vested in the city except otherwise prescribed by law. The mayor is directly elected by popular vote for a four-year term. The mayor is also responsible for creating the city's budget through the Office of Management and Budget, submitted for approval, not drafting, to the Louisville Metro Council.

The Mayor's office is located at Louisville City Hall in Downtown Louisville. It has complete jurisdiction over the Louisville Metro and Jefferson County areas, in addition to partial jurisdiction over all Home-rule class cities within the Louisville Metro. The mayor appoints a large number of officials, including Commissioners, Directors, and Chiefs. Regulations approved by the mayor's office are compiled in the Louisville/Jefferson County Metro Code. According to current law, the Mayor is limited to three consecutive four-year terms in office but may run again after a four-year break.

Under KRS 67C.105 (5), the mayor is charged with nine specific duties and responsibilities under the law. Specifically, the mayor is empowered to: (a) Prepare and submit an annual report coinciding with the fiscal year, on the state of the consolidated local government, to be presented at a public meeting of the council; (b) Submit an annual budget; (c) Oversee the administration and implementation of the adopted budget ordinance; (d) Enforce the ordinances of the consolidated local government; (e) Supervise all officers, agents, employees, cabinets, departments, offices, agencies, functions, and duties of the consolidated local government; (f) Call special meetings of the consolidated local government council; (g) Appoint and remove his or her own staff at his or her own pleasure; (h) Execute written contracts or obligations of the consolidated local government; and (i) Approve or veto ordinances and resolutions adopted by the consolidated local government council.

== Legislative branch ==
Legislative Powers of the city of Louisville are vested in the Louisville Metro Council. Formally established in 2003 after the city/county merger, the council is a unicameral body consisting of 26 Council members, whose districts are defined by geographic population boundaries that each contain approximately 28,500 people. Although all cities in Jefferson County, apart from Louisville itself, maintained their respective status after the merger, their residents are represented on Metro Council and vote alongside other county residents. The seats come up for reelection every four years, using a staggered process so that only half of the seats are up every two years. Even numbered districts hold elections overlapping each quadrennial Presidential election, whilst odd numbered districts hold elections overlapping each quadrennial off-season election. All districts are redrawn approximately every ten years, after the Decennial United States Census. The last redistricting took place in 2021, after the results of the 2020 Census were published.

At the beginning of the first Legislative session (the first Monday in January) of each year, the 26 members of the Metro Council elect a Council President. The Council President serves for a one-year term, and while there is no term limit, no Council President has served for more than two terms, with the exception of former Councilman Jim King (D), who served an unprecedented four terms, from 2011 until 2015, when he died in office.

Bills passed by a simple majority are sent to the Mayor, who may sign them into law or veto them. If the Mayor vetoes a bill, the Council may override this veto with a two-thirds vote. Passed laws are incorporated into the Louisville Metro Code, which is published online. Since the city/county merger in 2003, only five bills have ever been vetoed by the mayor (three by Jerry Abramson, two by Greg Fischer). In addition, only one veto has ever been overruled by the Council.

The Metro Council is organized into 13 Standing Committees. Each Committee is led by a Chairman and Vice Chairman, both of whom are appointed by the Council President, who serves as an ex officio member of all committees.

== Public agencies ==
In the city of Louisville, Public Agency is the name given to various regulatory agencies and public-benefit corporations which operate within the city limits. While in theory public agencies within the city fall under the absolute jurisdiction of the Louisville Mayor's office, in practice each agency possesses varying degrees of independence from the Louisville Mayor's Office and the Louisville Metro Council based on their function and level of financial independence. Each agency has been created by the Louisville Metropolitan government to provide the city and its inhabitants with a specific service or to fulfill some other function in the public interest.

=== Louisville Free Public Library ===
Established in 1905 upon the merger of multiple private library systems in the city of Louisville, the Louisville Free Public Library (LFPL) is a fully integrated agency of the Louisville Metropolitan government. Library assets and buildings are owned by the metro government and library employees are metro government employees. The largest public library system in the U.S. state of Kentucky with seventeen branches, the LFPL serves the entirety of Jefferson County. The library's main branch is sited at Fourth and York streets, south of Broadway in Downtown Louisville.

The LFPL is overseen by a Director, who is appointed by the mayor of the Louisville Metro.

=== Louisville Regional Airport Authority ===
Founded in 1928, the Louisville Regional Airport Authority (LRAA) is an autonomous municipal corporation established by Chapter 77 of the 1928 Public Acts for the Commonwealth of Kentucky. Under the provisions of Kentucky Revised Statutes Chapter 183, the LRAA is responsible for the establishment, ownership, operation, development, and promotion of airport and air navigation facilities within the Louisville Metropolitan Area. The Authority currently operates Louisville International Airport (SDF), primarily a commercial operations airport, and Bowman Field (LOU), primarily a general aviation and air traffic reliever to SDF.

The Authority is overseen by an eleven-member Board of Directors which is responsible for the creation and enforcement of the policy and budget of the Authority and the airports under its jurisdiction. Additionally, the Board is tasked with the hiring of the Executive Director, who serves as the organization's chief executive officer and is tasked with governing the Authority. The Board is composed of the incumbent Mayor of Louisville, seven mayoral appointees, and three members appointed by the incumbent Governor of Kentucky. The Board members serve four-year staggered terms without compensation.

=== Transit Authority of River City (TARC) ===
The Transit Authority of River City (which markets itself under the name TARC) operates as a legal "Transit Authority" under KRS 96A.010 – .230. Founded in 1971 after the passage of state legislation in 1970 authorizing city and county governments in Kentucky to operate mass-transit systems using local funding, the Transit Authority of River City (henceforth abbreviated as "Louisville TARC" or "TARC") was created to absorb and replace the multiple private transit companies which existed in the city at the time. In 1974, one year after the passage of a controversial referendum pushed by then-mayor Harvey Sloane which raised the occupational privilege tax by 0.2%, TARC acquired the Louisville Transit Company and the Louisville Railway Company, which at the time were suffering severe financial difficulties and had planned to cease operations. Shortly after the acquisition, TARC began operating bussing services throughout the city. Over the last few decades since its inception, TARC has bought nearly all private transportation companies which operated within the Louisville city limits such as Blue Motor Coach lines and the Daisy Line.

Louisville TARC is administered by an eight-member Board of Directors overseen by a Chairman. The board is responsible for managing, controlling and conducting the business, activities and affairs of the Transit Authority. The TARC Board of Directors is also responsible for overall planning of the mass public transit in its service area. Each member of the board is appointed by the incumbent mayor and approved by the Louisville Metro Council for three-year terms. Under normal circumstances, terms are staggered so no more than two seats become vacant within a six-month time frame. There is no term limit for board members.

== Heraldry ==
The Seal of Louisville, Kentucky in its current form was adopted in 2003 upon the merger with Jefferson County, Kentucky. The seal reads LOUISVILLE – JEFFERSON COUNTY in a ring around a single fleur-de-lis with two stars. The seal includes the year 1778 (the year of Louisville's founding) on both sides. The seal was designed during a citywide competition by William Glenn Heck, an art director native to Louisville.

== See also ==
- Flag of Louisville, Kentucky
- Jefferson County, Kentucky
- Louisville, Kentucky
- Louisville Metro Council
