= Louisville Metro Council =

City council of Louisville, Kentucky

Type
- Type: Unicameral of Louisville/Jefferson County Metro, Kentucky
- Term limits: None

History
- Founded: January 1, 2003
- Preceded by: Louisville Board of Alderman and Jefferson County Fiscal Court
- New session started: January 9, 2025

Leadership
- President: Brent Ackerson (D) since January 9, 2025
- Majority Caucus Leader/President Pro-Tempore: Tammy Hawkins (D) since January 9, 2025
- Minority Caucus Leader: Anthony Piagentini (R) since January 3, 2023

Structure
- Seats: 26 members
- Political groups: Majority (13): Democratic (13); Democratic Socialist (1); Minority (13): Republican (12); Independent (1) (not caucusing)
- Length of term: Four years

Elections
- Voting system: First-past-the-post
- Last election: November 5, 2024
- Next election: November 3, 2026
- Redistricting: 2020

Meeting place
- Louisville City Hall

Website
- louisvilleky.gov/government/metro-council

Rules
- louisvilleky.gov/metro-council/document/mc-rules-02202023

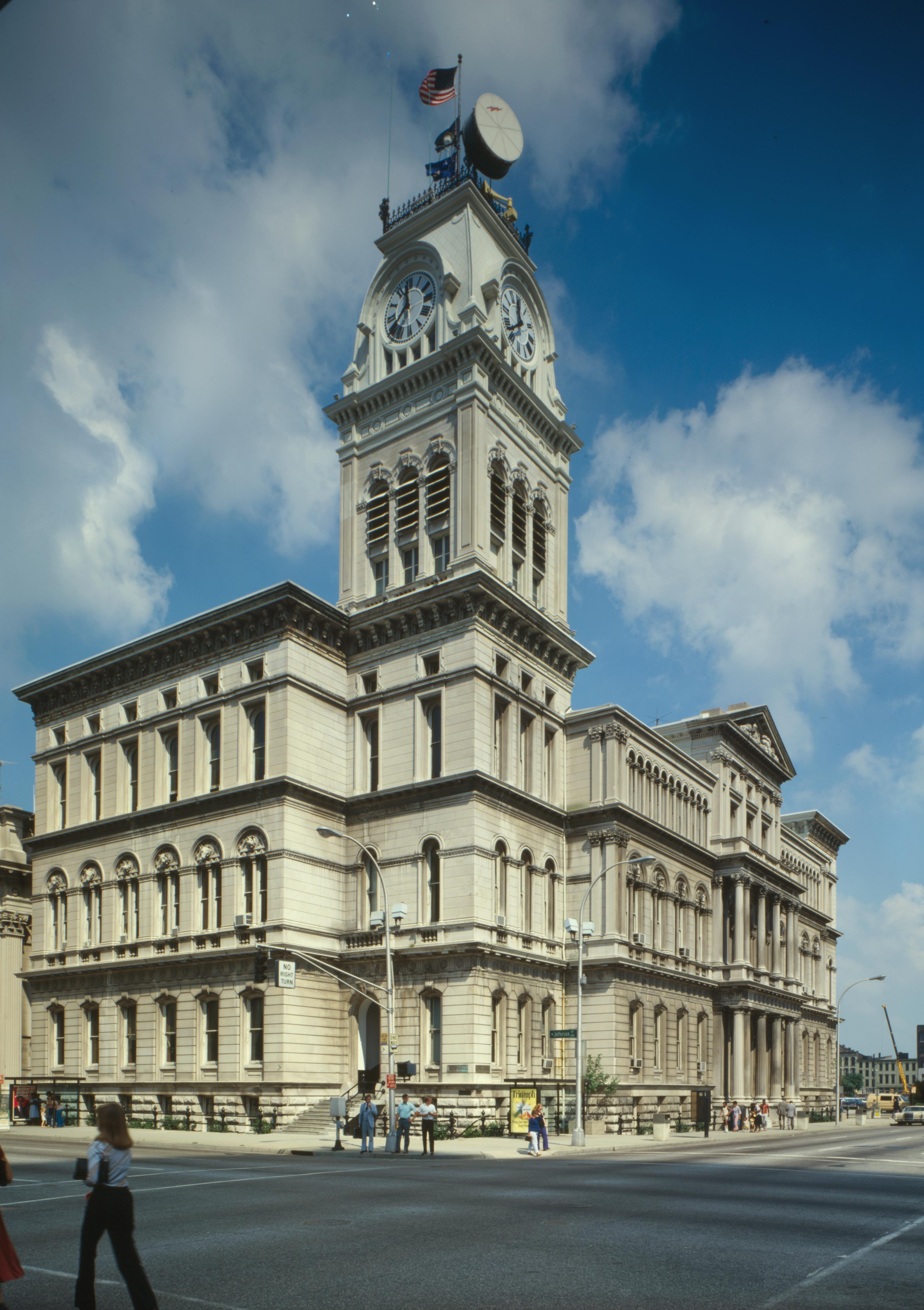
Louisville City Hall in downtown, built 1870–1873, is a blend of Italianate styles characteristic of Neo-Renaissance

The Louisville Metro Council is the city council of Louisville, Kentucky (Louisville Metro). It was formally established in January 2003 upon the merger of the former City of Louisville with Jefferson County and replaced the city's Board of Aldermen and the county's Fiscal Court (three county commissioners). Louisville City Hall houses the offices and chambers of the council.

Louisville's Metro Council consists of twenty-six seats corresponding to districts apportioned by population throughout Jefferson County. Although all cities in Jefferson County, apart from Louisville, retained their status after the merger, their residents are represented on Metro Council and vote alongside other county residents. The seats come up for reelection every four years, using a staggered process so that only half of the seats are up every two years.

Since the council's inception, Democrats have maintained a majority in the chamber, currently with thirteen members (50%). Democrats gained two seats in the 2010 election, gained another two seats in the 2018 midterms, lost two seats in the 2022 election, and 4 in the 2024 election yet still maintained a majority. On January 29, 2025, Democrat Paula McCraney announced she was leaving the party and becoming an independent.

== History ==
The first semblance of local government came shortly after the settlement began. This was originally considered part of Virginia. In 1779, pioneering founders elected five men as "trustees". In 1780 the town was formerly chartered and the Virginia legislature provided for local government by nine legislature-appointed trustees. When Kentucky became a state in 1792, the Kentucky legislature took over the appointments.

Trustees did not have to live in Louisville until a 1795 law change. In 1797 citizens were given home rule and the privilege of electing trustees. Most important decisions were made at the state level, and the trustees were administrators rather than legislators.

When Louisville was incorporated as Kentucky's first city in 1828, it gained greater autonomy. A ten-member "Common Council" was founded, to be headed by a mayor. In 1851 the city was given a new charter, keeping the Common Council as a "lower house" to the Board of Aldermen, an "upper house" of the city's legislative power. In 1929 the larger but less prestigious Common Council was eliminated. This legislative system continued until City-County Merger.

The 26-seat Louisville Metro Council was formally established in January 2003 upon the merger of the former City of Louisville with Jefferson County. It replaced both the city's Board of Aldermen and the county's Fiscal Court (three county commissioners).

== Council President ==
The Louisville Metro Council President is the presiding officer of the Louisville/Jefferson County Metro Council. The President is elected annually by a majority vote of the entire council at the council's first meeting in January. Currently the President is Brent Ackerson (D), who was elected on January 9, 2025.

Council Presidents

- 2025–present: Brent Ackerson (D)
- 2023–2025: Markus Winkler (D)
- 2018–2023: David James (D)
- 2016–2018: David Yates (D)
- 2015–2016: David W. Tandy (D)
- 2011–2015†: Jim King (D)
- 2010–2011: Tom Owen (D)
- 2009–2010: David W. Tandy (D)
- 2008–2009: Jim King (D)
- 2007–2008: Rick Blackwell (D)
- 2006–2007: Kevin Kramer (R)
- 2005–2006: Barbara Shanklin (D)
- 2004–2005: Kelly Downard (R)
- 2003–2004: Ron Weston (D)

†Died in office

== Members ==
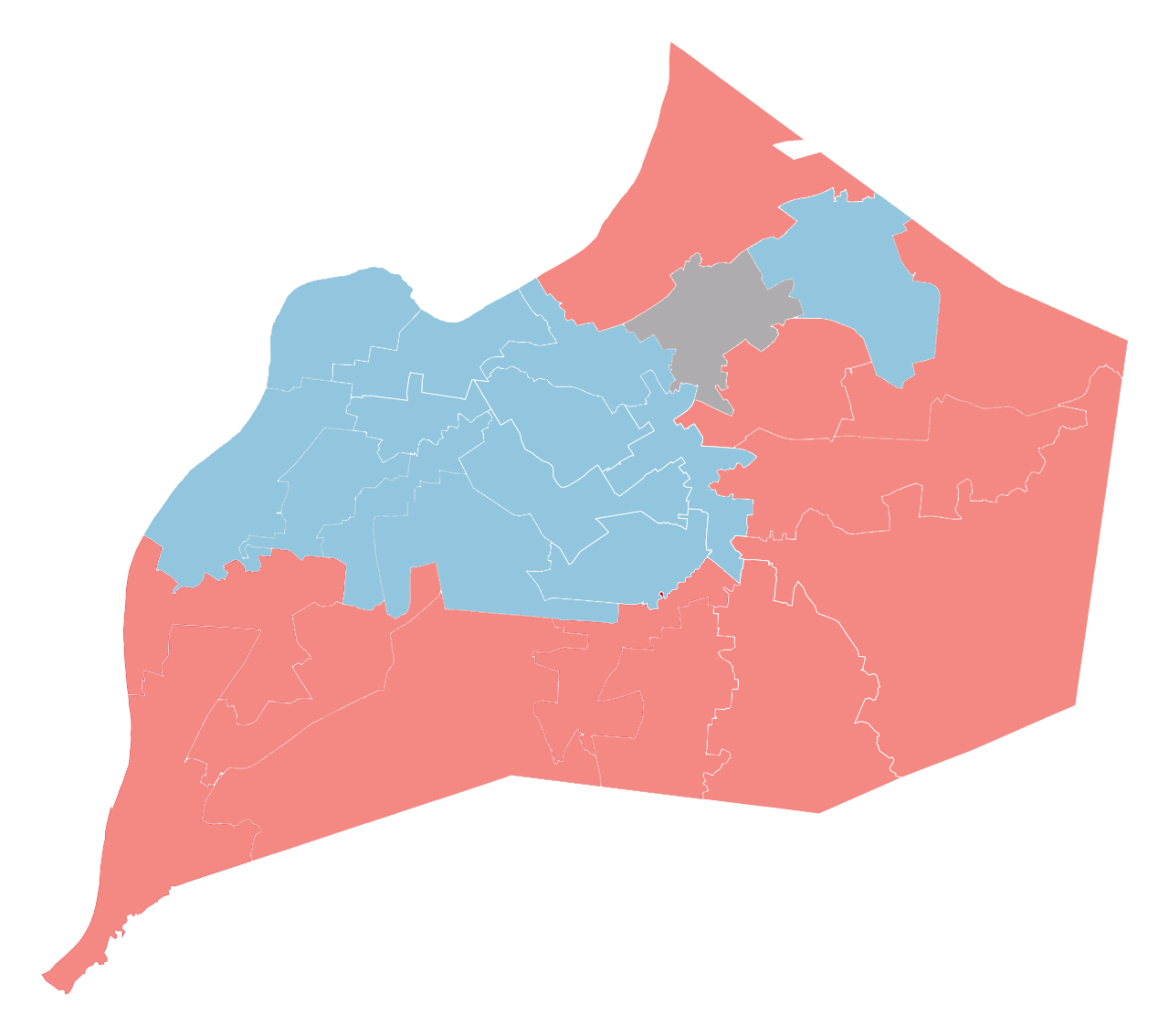
Party affiliation of members of the Louisville Metro Council as of November 8, 2025

Members of the Louisville Metro Council as of July 2026
District	Member	Political affiliation	Year elected
1	Tammy Hawkins	Democratic	2022
2	Barbara Shanklin	Democratic	2002
3	Shameka Parrish-Wright	Democratic	2023
4	Ken Herndon	Democratic	2024
5	Donna Lyvette Purvis	Democratic	2018
6	J.P. Lyninger	Democratic (Democratic Socialist) (Note: Although J.P. Lyninger ran on the Democratic Party line, he ran affiliated with and was endorsed by the Democratic Socialists of America.)	2024
7	Paula McCraney	Independent	2018
8	Ben Reno-Weber	Democratic	2022
9	Andrew Owen	Democratic	2022
10	Josie Raymond	Democratic	2024
11	Kevin Kramer	Republican	2002
12	Jonathan Joseph	Republican	2024
13	Dan Seum Jr.	Republican	2022
14	Crystal Bast	Republican	2024
15	Jennifer Chappell	Democratic	2022
16	Scott W. Reed	Republican	2016
17	Markus Winkler	Democratic	2018
18	Marilyn Parker	Republican	2012
19	Anthony Piagentini	Republican	2018
20	Stuart Benson	Republican	2002
21	Betsy Ruhe	Democratic	2022
22	Kevin Bratcher	Republican	2024
23	Jeff Hudson	Republican	2022
24	Ginni Mulvey-Woolridge	Republican	2024
25	Khalil Batshon	Republican	2022
26	Brent Ackerson	Democratic	2008

== Ordinances ==
In 2006, two controversial ordinances were passed: a smoking ban in and a restrictive animal control ordinance.

=== One Touch Make Ready ===
In 2016, Louisville's Metro Council was the first among several cities in the United States to approve a One Touch Make Ready ordinance for allowing new communications service providers to alter/relocate existing utility pole attachments owned by third party communications service providers. Louisville's Metro Council faced multiple lawsuits following its approval of the ordinance.

=== Breonna's Law ===
On June 10, 2020, the Metro Council unanimously approved ″Breonna's Law″ banning no-knock search warrants after the 26-year-old emergency room technician was killed by Louisville police on March 13, and the city erupted in violent protests on May 28. Police Chief Steve Conrad was fired on June 1 after the fatal shooting of black business owner David McAtee.

== See also ==
- List of mayors of Louisville, Kentucky
  - Craig Greenberg, currently the Mayor of Louisville Metro
- Government of Louisville, Kentucky
- Local government in the United States
- Seal of Louisville, Kentucky
