= Ryner =

Surname list

Ryner is a surname. Notable people with the surname include:

- Denise Ryner, Canadian curator and writer
- Han Ryner (1861–1938), French anarchist

== See also ==
- Riner (surname)
- Ryder (name)
- Ryne
- Wyner
