= List of 2020 Women's March locations =

2020 Women's March
- Part of the Women's rights movement
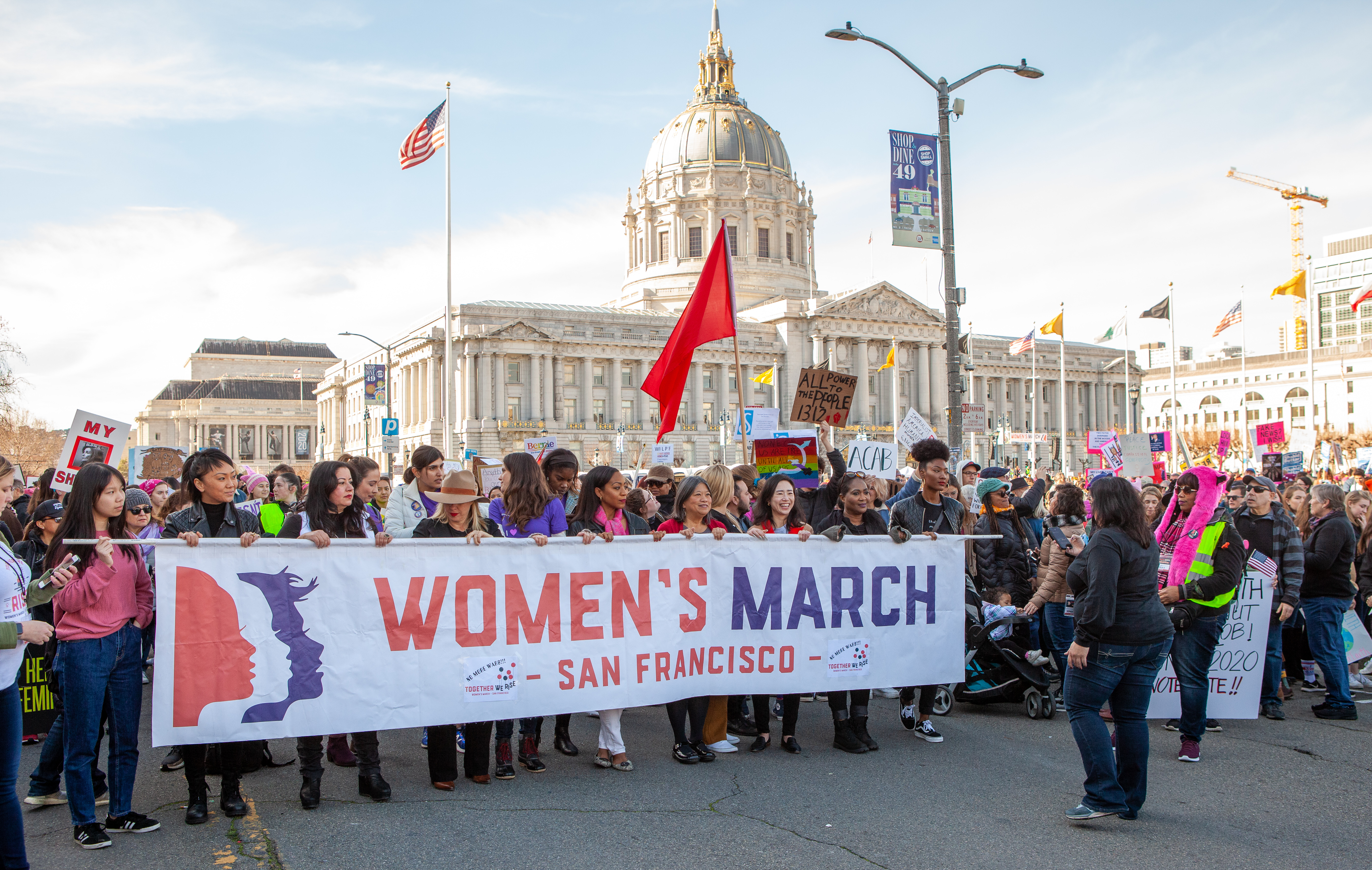
- San Francisco
- Date: January 18, 2020
- Location: United States
- Methods: Protest march

This is an incomplete list of the 2020 Women's March events in January, most of which took place on January 18, and some on January 19 or later (as noted).

== United States ==
Listed below are the marches in the U.S.

- AL
- AK
- AZ
- AR
- CA
- CO
- CT
- DC
- DE
- FL
- GA
- GU
- HI
- ID
- IL
- IN
- IA
- KS
- KY
- LA
- ME
- MD
- MA
- MI
- MN
- MS
- MO
- MT
- NE
- NV
- NH
- NJ
- NM
- NY
- NC
- ND
- OH
- OK
- OR
- PA
- RI
- SC
- SD
- TN
- TX
- UT
- VT
- VA
- WA
- WV
- WI
- WY

	Approximate attendance	Notes
Washington, D.C.	10,000 – 25,000	Over ten thousand people met at Freedom Plaza and marched clockwise around the White House; at one point, marchers stopped and chanted in front of Trump's DC Hotel. Martin Luther King III & his wife Andrea Waters King were present.

State	Date	Cities	Approximate attendance	Notes
Alabama	Mar. 1	Selma	thousands	Salute to Selma Women's March 2020 took place on Sunday, March 1, the start of Women's History Month, and in conjunction with events commemorating the 55th anniversary of Bloody Sunday, the Selma to Montgomery March and the passage of the Voting Rights Act of 1965. Thousands reenacted the historic crossing of the Edmund Pettus Bridge; participants included US Sen. Doug Jones, Jesse Jackson, the Rev. Al Sharpton and Georgia Rep. John Lewis (in a surprise appearance). Also present were a few 2020 Democratic presidential candidates – Pete Buttigieg, Amy Klobuchar, Elizabeth Warren, Tom Steyer, Michael Bloomberg and Joe Biden, the recent winner of the South Carolina primary.
Alaska		Anchorage	250	In 3-degree temperature, a couple hundred people marched through Cuddy Park toward the Assembly Chambers inside the Loussac Library.
Alaska	Jan. 19	Bethel	24	
Alaska		Cordova	30	People traversed First Street towards Cordova Center, holding placards in support of women's rights and the ERA
Alaska		Fairbanks		
Alaska		Homer	300	Homer Education and Recreation Complex (HERC) – WKFL Park
Alaska		Juneau	100+	Despite Taku winds and freezing temperatures, hundreds came out to the 2020 Women's March at the Alaska State Capitol Building, then marched to Centennial Hall. State Reps. Sara Hannan & Andi Story spoke at the rally. The theme of choice for the march was "The Angry Vagina."
Alaska		Palmer		
Alaska		Seward		
Arizona		Flagstaff		Flagstaff City Hall
Arizona		Payson	93	Two marches happened along the Beeline Highway – The Women's March at Big Lots' Parking Lot (almost 100 people), and the March for Life (roughly 300 residents)
Arizona	Jan. 19	Phoenix	2,000+	Arizona State Capitol
Arizona		Prescott	hundreds	Yavapai County Women March On; Prescott Courthouse Plaza
Arizona		Sedona	600+	event planned at Sedona Arts Center, during its "31 Women Artists Exhibition"
Arizona		Tucson	hundreds	Starting and ending at Joel D. Valdez Main Library, marchers walked a one-mile route through downtown Tucson (passing by local offices of Sen. Martha McSally along the way) to show their support in many issues affecting women such as enforcing the equal rights amendment, protecting women's reproductive rights, and ending violence against women.
Arkansas	Jan. 25	Little Rock	hundreds	The 10th Annual Rally for Reproductive Justice took place Saturday, January 25th at the Arkansas State Capitol (less than a week after thousands came out for the Arkansas March for Life).
California		Alameda	140	Safeway parking lot, 867 Island Drive
California		Avalon		Catalina Island Sister March; Avalon Wrigley Stage, Crescent Ave.
California		Bakersfield	4,000	At Mill Creek Park, civil rights activist Dolores Huerta led the 3rd annual Women's March of Kern County A number of marchers hailed from the town of Ridgecrest.
California		Burbank	hundreds	Chandler Bikeway, N. Mariposa Street
California		Chico	1,000	Chico City Plaza
California		Coachella	350-400	Veterans Memorial Park
California		Crescent City	100+	Crescent City held its 2nd Women's March in 2020, starting at Crescent Elk Middle School and ending at US Highway 101; marchers celebrated Virginia's decision to ratify the ERA.
California		Eureka	0	As happened with 2019's original march, so too was this one canceled, so that the organizing committee – once famously called "overwhelmingly white" – could "take time for more outreach." There was no alternative march either, unlike 2019, in which an estimated 900 had shown up.
California		Fresno		Women's March Fresno 4th Annual March was planned
California		Hemet	100+	Gibbel Park – North Kirby Street
California		Idyllwild		Idyllwild Town Monument, Ridgeview Dr.
California		Lakeport	75+	Courthouse Museum in downtown Lakeport
California		Los Angeles	200,000 – 300,000	At Pershing Square, police were told to expect as many as 200,000 people; by the march's end at City Hall, organizers estimated as many as 300,000. A large baby Trump balloon floated over the crowd. Some of the demonstrators dressed in early 20th century attire in observance of the 100th anniversary of the adoption of the 19th Amendment to the Constitution, giving women the right to vote. Emily Guereca, president of Women's March Foundation in Los Angeles, said that 60% of those who marched were first-time participants. Speakers at City Hall included Mayor Eric Garcetti, California Gov. Gavin Newsom and his wife Jennifer Siebel Newsom, women's rights attorney Gloria Allred and US Reps. Maxine Waters and Karen Bass. Celebrity activist speakers included Rosanna Arquette, Caitlyn Jenner, Marlee Matlin, Raven-Symoné, Constance Wu, & Frances Fisher. Musical performers included Seal & Jordin Sparks. Meanwhile, just a few miles away, the anti-abortion organization Walk for Life held its sixth annual OneLife L.A. march from Olvera Street to Los Angeles State Park.
California		Modesto	200	corner of Briggsmore & McHenry Aves. - Graceada Park
California		Monterey	1,000+	4th Annual Monterey Bay Women's March; Colton Hall Lawn
California		Napa	2,500	Veterans Memorial Park / Napa Hall of Justice
California		Oakland	5,000	Frank Ogawa Plaza – Telegraph Ave to Grand Ave & back.
California		Oceanside	600-1500	North County SD Women's March Rally; Oceanside Civic Center. Organizers said 1200–1500 people attended; police estimated 600–700
California		Pacifica		Women's March 2020 Coastside; Pacifica State Beach
California		Pleasanton	300+	Tri-Valley Women's March 2020; Amador Valley High School
California		Quincy	130	Plumas County Courthouse
California		Redding	600	Two groups – Redding Women's March & Redding March for Life – both gathered at Redding City Hall, then marched in opposite directions along Cypress Avenue
California		Riverside	hundreds	Women's March Inland Empire; Riverside County Historic Courthouse
California		Sacramento	10,000 – 12,000	A sea of pink hats marched from Southside Park up 9th Street to the State Capitol. Sacramento Mayor Darrell Steinberg & state Sen. Dr. Richard Pan (D-Sacramento) took part in the event.
California		San Diego	12,000	Waterfront Park / County Administration Center The 2020 march's theme was "Power in Unity."
California		San Francisco	12,000	Thousands packed in Civic Center before heading down Market Street towards Embarcadero Plaza. San Francisco Mayor London Breed was present.
California		San Jose	7,500	Womxn's March San Jose 2020: Our Power Counts; City Hall Rotunda – Arena Green
California		San Luis Obispo	thousands	At Mitchell Park, Women's March SLO 2020 theme was "The Time Is Now" SLO Mayor Heidi Harmon spoke at the rally.
California		San Mateo	150+	2020 marked the third year that three groups on the San Francisco Peninsula – San Mateo Peace Action, Indivisible CA-14 and the Raging Grannies Action League – came together at the corner 3rd Ave and El Camino to sponsor a musical rally in solidarity with the Women's March
California		Santa Ana	10,000-12,000	2020 OC Women's March; Civic Center Drive & Flower Street. US Rep. Katie Porter spoke at the rally; Costa Mesa Mayor Katrina Foley attended.
California		Santa Barbara	1,000+	Santa Barbara County Courthouse Sunken Garden – De la Guerra Plaza, in front of City Hall
California		Santa Cruz	0	On January 8, 2020, Santa Cruz Women's March announced it was retiring as a chapter & organization, joining three other California chapters doing likewise
California		Santa Maria	few hundred	Santa Maria held its 2nd annual march at Minami Community Park; its theme was "Because We Refuse to be Silenced." Among those in attendance were Santa Maria Mayor Alice Patino & US Rep Salud Carbajal.
California		Santa Rosa	1,000	Old Courthouse Square
California		Sonora	100	Courthouse Square
California		Stanford	dozens	Stanford Womxn's March; White Memorial Plaza, Lausen Mall
California		Truckee	100	Tahoe Truckee Women's March; Eagle Statue, Donner Pass Road
California		Ukiah	100+	Ukiah Courthouse
California		Ventura	1,000	Plaza Park Ventura, 651 E. Thompson Blvd. U.S. Rep. Julia Brownley (D-Westlake Village) addressed the crowd from the park's bandstand before the march began.
California		Visalia	100	intersection of Mooney Blvd & Walnut Ave
California		Walnut Creek	hundreds	Women's March Contra Costa 2020; Civic Park Community Center
California		Yucca Valley	30	Twentynine Palms Highway / corner of Hwy 62 and 247 (Old Woman Springs Rd.)
Colorado		Alamosa	275-300	San Luis Valley Women's March; ASU Campus, Main St (Hwy 160) & Richardson
Colorado		Aspen	50	Gondola Plaza / Paepke Park
Colorado		Broomfield	200	Broomfield Community Park Amphitheater – Broomfield Civic area
Colorado	Jan. 25	Colorado Springs	800-1,000	The 2020 COS Womxn's March started and ended at City Auditorium, wending through downtown streets. Keynote speakers inside the auditorium were Stephany Rose Spaulding & Lorena Garcia, two senatorial candidates seeking the Democratic nomination to run against Sen. Cory Gardner.
Colorado		Cortez	250	Cortez City Park
Colorado		Denver	10,000	Womxn's March Denver was held once again at Civic Center Park, following a route around the State Capitol and back to the park (rally not included).
Colorado		Durango	hundreds	College Drive – Buckley Park
Colorado		Estes Park	35	Bond Park
Colorado		Fraser	30	Foundry Cinema Parking Lot – Winter Park – Village Drive
Colorado		Glenwood Springs	250	Centennial Park – downtown Glenwood
Colorado		Grand Junction	hundreds	Western Colorado Women's March; Old Mesa County Courthouse – march down Rood Ave and Main St
Colorado		Greeley	150+	Lady Liberty at Weld County Courthouse steps – gazebo at center of Lincoln Park
Colorado		Gunnison	15	event held at Legion Park Pavilion by WCU Women's Student Lounge
Colorado		Steamboat Springs	100+	Library Hall – Historic Routt County Courthouse
Colorado		Telluride	25	event held at Elks Park
Colorado		Trinidad	26	event held intersection of Main St & Santa Fe Trail
Colorado		Vail	65	Vail Village – Lionshead
Connecticut		Bridgeport	several dozen	Instead of staging marches, event organizers in Connecticut held "Day of Action" press conferences outside several city federal buildings, including Bridgeport Superior Court
Connecticut		East Haddam	70+	Two Wrasslin' Cats Coffee House
Connecticut		Hartford	49	A "Day of Action" press conference was held on the steps of the Connecticut State Capitol
Connecticut		Kent	120+	4th Annual Kent Women's March; Golden Falcon Field
Connecticut		Mystic	8	RiseUpMystic Women's March; event planned near the John Kelley Statue
Connecticut		New Haven	35 - 50	A "Day of Action" press conference was held outside New Haven Superior Court
Connecticut		Stamford	10	#PinkWave2020 Rally for Women's Rights; Stamford Government Center
Delaware	Jan. 19	Lewes	100	Women's March Sussex 2020 Delaware would have participated in the MLK Jr. Celebration Parade through downtown Lewes on Saturday 18th, its theme being "Celebrating 100 Years of Women's Suffrage: The Struggle Continues." But due to uncertain weather conditions, the parade was canceled. So, on Sunday 19th, 100 people gathered at the Lewes Public Library for a "Looking Back, Moving Ahead" rally.
Delaware		Newark	200	Unitarian Universalist Fellowship of Newark – St. Thomas' Episcopal Church
Florida		Daytona Beach		Broadway Bridge, South Beach St. and International Speedway
Florida		Flagler Beach	500	Wadsworth Park – Veteran's Park. Nancy Soderberg, an American foreign policy strategist and former congressional candidate for Rep. Michael Waltz' seat, served as keynote speaker; current candidate for said seat, Richard Thripp, attended the rally.
Florida		Fort Myers	1,000	Alliance for the Arts, McGregor Blvd – Centennial Park
Florida		Gulfport	few hundred	Gulfport's 2nd annual Women's March was bigger than its first in 2019, at Gulfport Casino and along Shore Boulevard
Florida		Jacksonville	250	United for Change Rally & March; Hemming Park - Court House
Florida		Key West	hundreds	US Rep. Debbie Mucarsel-Powell joined the 4th annual Women's March in Key West, which began at Pocket Park, near the southernmost House, and traveled the entire length of Duval Street, ending with a rally at Mallory Square.
Florida		Melbourne	dozens	Brevard Women's March 2020 formed up near the Eau Gallie Causeway Boat Ramp and proceeded over the Causeway towards the Melbourne mainland before returning to the starting point. Also gathered nearby was a group of conservatives, many carrying flags and signs in support of President Trump. At some points, the opposing sides were amongst each other.
Florida		Miami Gardens	hundreds	Betty T. Ferguson Recreational Complex
Florida		Naples	2,000+	5th Avenue South – Cambier Park
Florida		New Smyrna Beach		NSB Women Rising Honk and Wave; event planned at corner of Washington St (44) and Riverside Drive
Florida		Ocala	100	Ocala Downtown Historic Square
Florida	Jan. 18 & 19	Orlando	few hundred	Two women's marches happened over the weekend at Orlando City Hall, both with hundreds in attendance. On Saturday, Central Florida Chapter of Women's March Florida got a spot in the Martin Luther King Parade and called out to all Central Florida women to come out and join. On Sunday, Women's and Allies March 2020, hosted by Orange County Florida Chapter of the National Organization for Women, marched to Lake Eola Park. State Reps Anna Eskamani & Amy Mercado & Orlando City Commissioner Patty Sheehan spoke at the latter event. A small group of pro-life counter-protesters waved signs and used a megaphone to interrupt speakers; attendees responded by forming a circle around the aggressors, with locked hands and fabric butterfly wings unfurled from their arms.
Florida		Pensacola	200	Seville Square / Pensacola City Hall
Florida		Punta Gorda	200+	Charlotte County Women's March 2020; Laishley Park Pavilion – northbound US 41 bridge. US congressional candidate Allen Ellison participated in the march.
Florida		Sarasota	few hundred	Unconditional Surrender (Kissing Statue), Bayfront – John Ringling Causeway Bridge – Bird Key
Florida		Tallahassee	100	Florida State Capitol Building
(Georgia (U.S. state)) Georgia	Jan. 25	Atlanta	63	Georgia Women's Alliance Rally was held at Manuel's Tavern and hosted by state Senate candidate Triana Arnold James.
Guam		Hagåtña	hundreds	Fanohge Famalao'an Women's March, led by Micronesia Climate Change Alliance and Maga'håga Rising, ran from Agana Bay at the Paseo de Susana park to the Women of the Islands statue next to Alupang Beach Tower, where they performed a tribute to survivors of violence. Gov. Lou Leon Guerrero, the first female governor of the island, attended the event.
Hawaii	Jan. 19	Hilo	hundreds	march begun at Mo'oheau Bandstand
Hawaii		Honolulu		event planned at Hawaii State Capitol / Honolulu Zoo
Hawaii		Kailua		event planned near 1467 Kiukee Place
Hawaii		Kahului	1,000+	UH Maui College
Idaho		Boise	1,500+	Hundreds showed up at Idaho Capitol Mall on Saturday for two separate marches. The first one, at 9 a.m., was the Fourth Annual Women's March, with the theme "Demonstrating the Power of Idaho Women in Our Democracy." Former Democratic nominee for governor in 2018 and former state representative Paulette Jordan emcee'd the event. Standing across Jefferson Street from the Capitol were groups of anti-abortion activists and a rally of MAGA Girls, whose views were espoused at the Boise March for Life later that afternoon.
Idaho	Jan. 25	Idaho Falls	150+	Museum of Idaho - Idaho Falls Public Library
Idaho		Ketchum	100	State Rep Muffy Davis spoke at the rally in Ketchum Town Square.
Idaho		Moscow	200	Women's March on the Palouse; Moscow City Hall – East City Park
Idaho		Sandpoint	several hundred	Sandpoint Middle School - Matchwood Brewing
Illinois	Jan. 25	Champaign-Urbana	few dozen	UIUC Women's March 2020; Alma Mater, Main Quad
Illinois		Chicago	10,000	After a hiatus in 2019, and despite a winter storm, thousands gathered in Grant Park and marched to Federal Plaza for Chicago's 3rd Women's March (albeit with only a fraction of the turnouts from the previous two). New Chicago Mayor Lori Lightfoot participated. Among issues of focus were the 2020 census, gun violence protection, climate change, affordable health care & voting rights. After the march officially ended, a group of 100 walked to Trump Towers for further protest.
Illinois		Evanston	154	Members of Indivisible Evanston gathered at Evanston Davis Street station to join up with Chicago's 2020 march.
Illinois		Geneva	1,200	The 2nd Women's March Fox Valley, with the theme "March to the Polls," gathered at the Old Kane County Courthouse. A group representing Indivisible Aurora attended the march. Geneva Mayor Kevin Burns welcomed the crowd; other keynote speakers were US Reps Lauren Underwood & Bill Foster.
Illinois		Oak Park	8	"Kina (Collins) for Congress" campaign at Ridgeland Station
Illinois		Rockford	200+	Rockford City Market Pavilion - State Street Bridge and back. US Rep. Cheri Bustos & Rockford Mayor Tom McNamara were among those who braved frigid temperatures to participate in the march.
Illinois	Mar. 8	Springfield	hundreds	Illinois State Capitol, Lincoln Statue; rally rescheduled from its original frigid January date to International Women's Day. Second-time congressional candidate Betsy Dirksen Londrigan was present, again trying to unseat U.S. Rep. Rodney Davis.
Illinois		Woodstock	200	Woodstock Square Historic District
Indiana		Evansville		event planned at University of Evansville, in front of Olmsted Hall
Indiana		Fort Wayne	64	event held at Allen County Courthouse
Indiana	Jan. 18 & 22	Indianapolis	dozens	On Saturday January 18th, Indy Women's March 2020 took place near Soldiers and Sailors Monument at Monument Circle, where people marched around in chilling rain. On Wednesday, January 22, Indiana March for Choice 2020 observed the 47th anniversary of Roe v. Wade at Monument Circle - primarily as a counter-protest to a pro-life march and rally headed for the State House.
Iowa	Jan. 25	Dubuque	dozens	Organized by Indivisible Dubuque, the event took place indoors at Steeple Square; poor road and weather conditions postponed its original date, January 18, by one week, closer to the Iowa caucuses. Key speakers included state Sen. Pam Jochum, U.S. Senate Democratic candidates Kimberly Graham, Eddie Mauro and Cal Woods (vying for incumbent Sen. Joni Ernst's seat), and representatives from the Joe Biden, Amy Klobuchar, Elizabeth Warren and Tom Steyer campaigns.
Iowa		Iowa City	0	Iowa City's fourth annual Women's March, set for downtown Pedestrian Mall, was canceled due to inclement weather.
Iowa		Red Oak		SW Iowa Women's March Red Oak (hometown of Sen. Joni Ernst) planned an event at Legion Park.
Iowa	Jan. 25	Waterloo	hundreds	Cedar Valley Women's March held its first event at Single Speed Brewery, then paraded down Commercial & Jefferson Streets.
Kansas		Lawrence	50+	rally & march held at South Park, Massachusetts St
Kansas	Jan. 25	Pittsburg	dozens	SEK NOW Women's March in Downtown Pittsburg
Kansas	Jan. 25	Wichita	500 - 2,000	Women's March Air Capital 2020 gathered at Old Town Square and marched less than a block to the rally venue, The Wave, on E 2nd Street. Their theme was "The Time is Now."
Kentucky		Lexington	few hundred	Robert F. Stephens Courthouse Plaza. The march opened with a feminist rendition of "America the Beautiful" and speeches from prominent activists (including State Rep Attica Scott), before marchers walked down Main Street.
Kentucky		Louisville	100+	At Louisville Metro Hall, US Rep. John Yarmuth & state Reps Attica Scott & Charles Booker spoke to the crowd.
Louisiana		St. Francisville		West Feliciana Parish Courthouse – Parker Park, via Ferdinand Street
Maine		Auburn		Event planned at Longley Bridge (Auburn Side), Main St & Court St
Maine		Bar Harbor	175	Island Women's March 2020 was held on the Village Green, co-sponsored by Indivisible MDI. Maine Secretary of State and Bar Harbor native Matthew Dunlap spoke at the event.
Maine		Eastport	31	Shead High School - Washington St & Water St - Fisherman Statue
Maine		Portland	several hundred	Monument Square, Congress Street – Portland High School. Some demonstrators carried signs in support of Donald Trump's impeachment, while others singled out US Senator Susan Collins for her vote to confirm Supreme Court Justice Brett Kavanaugh.
Maryland		Annapolis	100	Whitmore Urban Park; Annapolis Mayor Gavin Buckley gave remarks before the march.
Maryland		Ocean City	50	Ocean City Boardwalk
Massachusetts		Andover	~80	Shawsheen Square
Massachusetts		Ashfield	55	Ashfield Town Hall
Massachusetts		Ayer		event planned at Ayer Town Hall
Massachusetts		Boston	0	March Forward Massachusetts, which had overseen previous women's marches in Boston and Cambridge, decided in November 2019 not to hold another one in January 2020 due to financial strain and waning enthusiasm for freezing winter cold.
Massachusetts		Cambridge	~65	Cambridge Common; this spontaneous rally happened only in response to a Facebook event page which had no official sponsor or organization behind it.
Massachusetts		Greenfield		event planned at Greenfield Town Common
Massachusetts		Ipswich	100	People gathered in 20-degree temperature at Ipswich Center Green, next to the Hall-Haskell House, and held signs before passing cars. Topsfield native Jamie Zahlaway Belsito, a congressional candidate for Rep. Seth Moulton's seat, was among about half a dozen speakers.
Massachusetts		Martha's Vineyard	40+	Five Corners, Vineyard Haven
Massachusetts		Northborough	dozen	"Trust Women" rally; Trinity Church of Northborough
Massachusetts		Springfield (was Northampton)	500	Having taken place three times in Northampton, the 4th Annual Pioneer Valley Women's March was moved to Springfield; people marched along Main Street from Northgate Center parking lot to Springfield City Hall.
Michigan		Adrian	2	event planned at Old Court House on Main St
Michigan		Clinton Township	50	Macomb Michigan Women's March Sister March; Patridge Creek Mall. The 50 people who showed up to rally were also joined by 10 pro-Trump counter-protesters.
Michigan		Douglas / Saugatuck	100	Saugatuck-Douglas Sister March; Beery Field
Michigan		Holland	0	event planned at Centennial Park, then cancelled in favor of going to the Douglas/Saugatuck march
Michigan		Houghton	50	Portage Lake Lift Bridge, between Houghton and Hancock
Michigan		Kalamazoo	200+	Bronson Park – First Congregational Church
Michigan		Lansing	several hundred	Despite a prior winter storm of 6 inches of snow, hundreds gathered at Lansing Capital Building. Michigan Governor Gretchen Whitmer, US Rep. Elissa Slotkin, US Sen Debbie Stabenow & state AG Dana Nessel (keynote speaker) rallied the crowd.
Michigan		Ludington	50	Despite inches of snow in Rotary Park, the first Ludington Women's March went on as scheduled. The event was cut short by an hour, and the march portion of the rally was swapped for a sing-along.
Michigan		Marquette	hundreds	At the Marquette Commons, hundreds turned up for the city's forth annual Women's March. Following the march, the second annual Women's March Post-Reception Rise U.P. was held by Northern Michigan University's Public Relations Student Society of America chapter at the Ore Dock Brewing Co.
Michigan		Midland	20+	rally held at Veterans Memorial at Midland County Courthouse
Michigan		Suttons Bay		Micro-March Leelanau; event planned at Suttons Bay Post Office parking lot
Michigan		Traverse City	50 - 230	Women's March TC 2020; People gathered at Workshop Brewing Company and marched downtown in the snow.
Minnesota		Bemidji	60	Bemidji State University's Beaux Arts Ballroom – Paul Bunyon & Babe the Blue Ox statues (2 mile route). The topic of refugees became a central focus in this 2020 march. Earlier on January 7, the Beltrami County Board of Commissioners voted 3–2 to opt out of the United States Refugee Resettlement Program, as authorized through an executive order by President Trump. The vote later became temporarily null on January 15 after a decision in federal court. Bemidji Mayor Rita Albrecht addressed these developments at the rally.
Minnesota	Feb. 14	Duluth	hundreds	5th Annual MMIW Memorial March, hosted by the American Indian Community Housing Organization (AICHO). Hundreds marched through downtown Duluth.
Minnesota		Grand Marais	11	corner of Wisconsin St & Hwy 61, near Java Moose; hosted by Arrowhead Indivisible
Minnesota		Northfield	80	Ames Park – Bridge Square, via Division Street
Minnesota		St. Peter	0	Nicollet County Courthouse – Minnesota Square Park Pavilion (canceled due to forecast of bad weather)
Minnesota		Thief River Falls		event planned at City Hall
Mississippi		Jackson	58	events held at Mississippi Civil Rights Museum and the State Capitol.
Mississippi		Philadelphia		event planned at DeWeese Park
Missouri		Columbia	100	People occupied the Boone County Courthouse Plaza in frigid temperatures, then marched down Broadway and Tenth Street.
Missouri		Kansas City	couple hundred	Two rallies were planned at KC on January 18, 2020. In response to the traditional Women's March KC, run by Unity Southeast in Kansas City at J.C. Nichols Memorial Fountain on the [Country Club] Plaza, the Reale Justice Network created a more inclusive alternative event, the KC Reale Womxn's Rally, at the Mohart Community Center, to talk issues faced by women of color and transgender.
Missouri		St. Louis	thousands	Demonstrators gathered at Poelker Park (across from City Hall) and marched along Market St towards the St. Louis Arch grounds. Themes of this year's march were "Be Counted" and "March to the Polls."
Montana		Bozeman	500-700	Gallatin & Park County Women's March 2020; Main St & 8th Ave – MSU's SUB Ballroom A
Montana		Hamilton	200+	Ravalli County Women's March; River Park
Montana		Helena	700+	At Memorial Park, Congressional candidate and former state Rep. Kathleen Williams delivered an impassioned keynote address during the event that boasted the theme of "Put a Woman in Charge."
Montana		Missoula	13	Higgins Avenue Bridge
Montana		Whitefish	50	across from the Whitefish Middle School
Nebraska	(Apr. 4)	Lincoln	0	Lincoln Women's March 2020; UNL Nebraska Unions. A poor weather forecast for the original date of March 14 led organizers to delay the march by three weeks, by which time the Coronavirus pandemic forced them to cancel.
Nebraska	Mar. 8	Omaha	hundreds	2020 Omaha Women's Day March took place at Turner Park. Democratic Senate candidate Alisha Shelton participated.
Nevada		Las Vegas	hundreds	Empowering Women March in Downtown Las Vegas started at Llama Lot and arrived at the Lloyd D. George Courthouse, where hundreds rallied for about 90 minutes. A small group of counterprotesters stood by, with one member (armed with a handgun) using a megaphone to shout out various far-right insults at marchers; Metropolitan Police maintained a 20-foot buffer on the court's front sidewalk. US Rep. Steven Horsford participated in the march, but did not speak at the rally.
Nevada		Pahrump		Pahrump Women Rising 2020 March; event planned at Hwy 160 and Hwy 372, corner by Nugget
Nevada		Reno	thousands	Thousands packed Reno City Plaza by the Believe Sign, then marched down North Virginia Beach to the Reno Events Center. Among the crowd were 250 Pete Buttigieg supporters, aka "barnstormers for Pete," as well as advocates for LGBTQ+ rights and members of Indigenous Northern Nevada tribes.
New Hampshire		Concord	hundreds	New Hampshire State House. US Sen. Jeanne Shaheen & US Rep. Chris Pappas spoke at the rally. Former Massachusetts governor and 2020 Republican challenger to Donald Trump, Bill Weld was also present.
New Hampshire		Keene		event planned at Central Square
New Hampshire		Lancaster		North County Women's March; event planned at Welcome Center parking lot
New Hampshire		Portsmouth	300	Seacoast Women's March 2020 was held at Market Square. Presidential candidate Sen. Bernie Sanders (I-VT) made a surprise campaign stop to a delighted crowd, and delivered a speech in front of the North Church.
New Hampshire		Wilton	22	Outside the Wilton Public Library, a "Travelling Sununu Graveyard" was staged, with makeshift headstones for 57 legislative bills vetoed by Governor Chris Sununu.
New Jersey		Atlantic City	hundreds	Weather conditions forced organizers to skip the usual outdoor boardwalk march and host the entire event inside Adrian Phillips Ballroom at Jim Whelan Boardwalk Hall, under the 2020 theme "Together We Rise." The weather also prevented Lt. Gov. Sheila Oliver from attending the rally and giving the keynote speech.
New Mexico	Jan. 22	Alamogordo		For the lack of a 2020 march in Las Cruces, southern New Mexicans were given a chance to show their support at the annual Roe v Wade Commemorative Demonstration, hosted by We Trust Women, at the intersection of White Sands Blvd and 10th Street in Alamogordo.
New Mexico	Jan. 19	Albuquerque	2,000+	Albuquerque Civic Plaza. US Reps Deb Haaland & Ben Ray Luján were among a dozen speakers.
New Mexico		Santa Fe	hundreds	New Mexico State Capitol (Roundhouse)
New Mexico		Socorro	55	Great Socorro Women's March; New Mexico Tech – Plaza Park
New Mexico		Taos	100	Taos Women Rising, at Taos Town Plaza
New York		Beacon	dozen	Southern Dutchess Resist; Polhill Park
New York	Jan. 19	Buffalo	200+	Despite cold, snowy & windy conditions on Sunday afternoon, hundreds still took to Niagara Square outside Buffalo City Hall.
New York		Cobleskill		event planned at Veteran's Park
New York		Cold Spring		Hudson Highlands Women Rising in Cold Spring - A group of Philipstown residents gathered on the great lawn at St. Mary's Episcopal Church in frigid weather before walking to the train to send off a contingent to the annual Women's March in New York City.
New York	Jan. 19	Elmira	~100	Wisner Park, Church & Main St. Democratic congressional candidate Tracy Mitrano was present.
New York		Glens Falls	150	Starting at Crandall Park, over a hundred women & men walked three blocks along Glen Street to the Crandall Public Library. The day before, a pro-Trump group had boasted on social media of staging a counter-protest, but only three showed up by which time most of the marchers had dispersed.
New York		Lewis	34	Adirondack Women's March 2020; Lewis Cemetery (grave of suffragette Inez Milholland)
New York		New York City	10,000	Two marching groups – Women's March Alliance & Women's March NYC – gathered respectively at Central Park Columbus Circle and Foley Square, but later converged near Times Square with a unifying theme, "Rise and Roar." Borough-based organizations like Move Forward Staten Island and Staten Island Women Who March traveled to the march via the Staten Island Ferry. Evelyn Yang, sexual assault survivor and wife of presidential candidate Andrew Yang, spoke in New York City; Sen. Chuck Schumer greeted the marchers.
New York		Port Jefferson	100	Resistance Corner on Nesconset Highway; 100 people showed up, compared with 2,000 in 2017.
New York		Port Jervis	200-300	St. Peter's Lutheran Church
New York		Potsdam	30	rally held at Potsdam Town Hall
New York		Saratoga Springs	300	Congress Park at Trask Memorial Fountain (near Saratoga Arts Council)
New York		Schenectady	300	1st annual Schenectady Women's March; Schenectady City Hall – Schenectady YWCA
New York	Jan. 17 – 19	Seneca Falls	thousands	The Fourth annual Women's March in Seneca Falls, home of the first Convention on Women's Rights, took place from Friday to Sunday, as thousands came to commemorate the centennial of the passage of the 19th Amendment, which gave women the right to vote. Activities started Friday at the Auburn Equal Rights Heritage Center. On Saturday, at Trinity Park, the march was kicked off by Coline Jenkins, great-great-granddaughter of suffragette Elizabeth Cady Stanton. Attendees braved snow and freezing temperatures as they marched from Lower Fall Street to Trinity Lane. The event concluded on Sunday at First Presbyterian Church of Seneca Falls.
New York		Syracuse	150	People marched in bitter cold from the James M. Hanley Federal Building to the University United Methodist Church
New York		Utica	50	Mohawk Valley YWCA – Utica City Hall
New York		Woodstock	hundreds	2020 Woodstock NY Women's March; Playhouse Land – Village Green. Participants at the front of the procession held up larger than life puppets made by Redwing Blackbird Theater.
North Carolina	Jan. 11	Albemarle	several dozen	event held at EE Waddell Center
North Carolina	Sept. 20	Asheville	~85 (online)	Organizers were unable to host an official Women's March in January 2020 because of financial strain and arctic temperatures, but they announced another would be planned "around the month of September 2020... close to election time." As the Coronavirus pandemic would have it, the rally officially became virtual.
North Carolina		Black Mountain	hundreds	Town Square
North Carolina	Jan. 25	Charlotte	"at least several thousand"	First Ward Park. The turnout was considerably larger than in 2019, according to Laura Meier, co-president of Charlotte Women's Movement, and with more youth than ever bringing a renewed energy. US Rep Deb Butler of Wilmington delivered the keynote; other speakers were several teenage climate activists. One anti-abortion protester showed up with a placard and began shouting, only to be encircled and drowned out by a dozen women, then escorted away by a park ranger.
North Carolina		Fayetteville		Fayetteville NOW marching with Cape Fear Indivisible in the MLK parade.
North Carolina	Jan. 26	Raleigh	thousands	Halifax Mall, 16 W. Jones St. The theme for this year's event was "Women Protecting the Future." Chapel Hill Mayor Pam Hemminger & Wake County Commissioner Jessica Holmes showed up for the rally.
North Carolina		Sylva	200	Bridge Park, 76 Railroad Avenue. Bad weather kept attendees in Sylva from marching on Saturday, but the crowd still gathered in support of the event.
North Carolina		Wilmington	500	Innes Park. US Rep Deb Butler spoke at the rally (she would later speak at Charlotte the following Saturday), as did US Senate candidate Dr. Erica D. Smith.
North Dakota		Bismarck	60	Bismarck's 2020 march not only celebrated women's rights but also offered their support to refugees.
North Dakota	Mar. 7	Fargo	~50+	Due to a snowstorm, the 2020 Fargo-Moorhead Women's March, set to begin at NDSU Memorial Union Ballroom, had to be rescheduled from January to March, on International Women's Day. ND House Rep Karla Rose Hanson was a pre-rally speaker, and dozens participated in the march.
North Dakota		Minot		march planned at Ward County Courthouse
Ohio		Akron	200	Freezing rain, treacherous roads and 4 inches of slush on sidewalks Saturday forced organizers to delay Akron's march 30 minutes and then move it indoors at Musica, where they focused on the lack of economic opportunity in the black community, environmental issues on Akron's east and south sides, limits on local Planned Parenthood, homelessness and refugees.
Ohio		Canton	80-100	Despite cold rain & slushy sidewalks, 80-100 people showed up for the 4th Annual Northeast Ohio Women's March Canton, starting in Central Plaza, then heading around the Stark County Courthouse.
Ohio		Cincinnati	hundreds	Sawyer Point Park
Ohio		Cleveland	200	Steps of Cleveland City Hall – Public Square
Ohio		Columbus	0	Columbus, OH did not stage a women's march in 2020. Despite its endurance as a global movement, former executive director of the Ohio Women's March Rhiannon Childs said organizing the march demanded a high level of stamina that wasn't sustainable.
Ohio		Dayton	150	After being snowed out of a march in 2019, people were back rallying in Dayton at Courthouse Square, albeit as a smaller crowd against rainy weather.
Ohio		Delaware	few dozen	Delaware County Courthouse - Bicentennial Park Gazebo. Congressional candidates in attendance included Shannon Freshour (District 4) and guest speaker Alaina Shearer (District 12).
Ohio		Wellington		event planned at Wellington Public Library
Ohio		Westerville	100	Westerville City Hall – Otterbein University
Ohio		Wooster	50	Wintry weather conditions forced organizers to cancel the march to the Wooster City Municipal Building, and just stick with a rally in the downtown square.
Oklahoma	Jan. 25	Oklahoma City	350	Women's March Oklahoma (WMOK) gathered at Scissortail Park. The march's theme was #WomenRising2020
Oklahoma		Tulsa	hundreds	Guthrie Green – John Hope Franklin Reconciliation Park
Oregon	Sept. 20	Ashland (was Medford)	~50+	The Women's March Southern Oregon 2020 in Jackson County, originally scheduled on March 29 and set to start and end at the Medford Armory, followed by a Women's Faire, was called off in the wake of the Coronavirus pandemic, with the hope of possible rescheduling in the fall. As fate would have it, a Sunday vigil for the passing of Justice Ruth Bader Ginsburg was held at Ashland Plaza, sponsored by both Women's March Southern Oregon and Oregon District 2-Indivisible. Ashland city councilor & mayoral candidate Tonya Graham spoke at the vigil.
Oregon		Astoria	20	Indivisible North Coast Oregon (INCO) planned an event, "March to Win," in downtown Astoria at Heritage Square.
Oregon		Brookings	75	Curry County Triple Women's March 2020 – Women on Fire; People gathered at the Curry Democrats Office and marched for 90 minutes. Apart from passing cars on Highway 101 that honked and waved their support, there was one truck with a "Trump 2020" banner from its bed that drove by the group multiple times.
Oregon		Coos Bay	85	Coos Bay Boardwalk, Hwy 101 and Anderson
Oregon		Corvallis		"Still We Rise" march planned at Central Park
Oregon		The Dalles	hundreds	Gorge Womxns March 2020 was held at The Dalles City Park. One of the attendees, Alex Spenser, a Klamath Falls native involved with Klamath Indivisible, soon thereafter declared her congressional candidacy for Oregon's District 2.
Oregon		Eugene	40	University of Oregon EMU Fishbowl – Federal Courthouse. The event was more informal and improvised, rather than organized in advance as before.
Oregon		Florence	100+	Florence United Methodist Church – Hwy 101
Oregon		Gold Beach	30	old library parking lot, east of County Courthouse Square on Hwy 101 - Ray's
Oregon		Hood River	20	Jackson Park – Hood River Library
Oregon		Klamath Falls		4th Women's March in Klamath Falls planned by local native activist (& recent candidate for Congress) Alex Spenser.
Oregon		Port Orford	100+	Battle Rock Beach, Hwy 101 at Jefferson
Oregon	Mar. 1	Portland	thousands	2020 Womxn's March & Rally for Action Portland; held at South Park Blocks at Portland State University
Oregon		Redmond (was Bend)	hundreds	The organizers of Central Oregon Women's March in Bend decided to move their annual event to Redmond to attract more supporters from outlying communities in the High Desert. Hundreds did gather in Redmond's Centennial Park.
Oregon		Roseburg	100	Douglas County Womxn's March; in front of Fred Meyer, Garden Valley Blvd
Oregon	Mar. 8	Salem	700	march & rally held on International Women's Day at Oregon State Capitol Mall
Oregon		Sandy		event planned at Centennial Plaza
Oregon		Yachats		march planned at Yachats Commons
Pennsylvania		Allentown	20+	The King Day of Action Community Bonfire event, hosted by Lehigh Valley Stands Up, was held at Resurrected Life Community Parking Lot.
Pennsylvania		Beaver	four dozen	Beaver County Courthouse. US Rep. Conor Lamb attended the rally.
Pennsylvania		Clarion	0	event planned at Clarion Free Library but cancelled due to inclement weather
Pennsylvania		Doylestown	0	potluck event planned at Salem Church (home of the Rainbow Room), but cancelled due to a snowstorm.
Pennsylvania		Easton		Community Potluck and Puppet Parade; event planned at Book & Puppet Co
Pennsylvania		Gettysburg	dozens	Lincoln Square – Unity Park, on Baltimore Street
Pennsylvania		Indiana		Women Rising 2020; event planned at Artists Hand Gallery
Pennsylvania		Kingston		event planned at Kirby Park
Pennsylvania		Media		Barrell Community Park, corner of State & Radnor - local courthouse
Pennsylvania		New Castle	dozens	Women's March 2020 – 100 Years of Strong Women; Atrium of the Riverplex
Pennsylvania		Philadelphia	300	Logan Circle – Philadelphia Museum of Art. Several hundred came despite snowy weather; Philadelphia Mayor Jim Kenney spoke to the crowd.
Pennsylvania		Pittsburgh	couple hundred	At City County building on Grant St, people huddled on the landing from the freezing rain, then marched to Market Square, where they were met by counter-protesters. Pittsburgh Mayor Bill Peduto was scheduled to speak.
Pennsylvania	Aug. 16	Pottsville	35	Schuylkill Women Rising 2020; Union Station, Progress Cir – Majestic Theater (postponed from 1/18 due to bad weather)
Pennsylvania		Reading	100+	Participants gathered in the lobby DoubleTree by Hilton hotel at Sixth and Penn, for what would have been Reading's first physical procession outdoors to City Hall (previous rallies were held in City Park). But heavy snowfall and cold temperatures created hazardous conditions for walking, so the event was re-accommodated in the hotel amphitheater.
Pennsylvania		State College		Women's March at Penn State; event planned at Old Main, 200 Pollock Road, University Park
Pennsylvania		Wilkes-Barre	60+	NEPA Women's March held its second event at Millennium Circle. Scranton Mayor Paige Cognetti & US Rep. Matt Cartwright were present.
Pennsylvania		York	just under 100	The first Women's March in York, PA headed down Market Street / Central Penn Market, exterior
Rhode Island		Providence	300	Rhode Island State House steps
South Carolina		Columbia	at least 5	rally held at South Carolina State House
South Carolina		Greenville	100	One City Plaza. US Rep Chandra Dillard spoke at the rally.
South Carolina		Myrtle Beach	hundreds	Myrtle Beach held its 3rd annual Women's March at Chapin Park. There was a voter registration booth, and representatives from the presidential campaigns of Bernie Sanders and Tom Steyer came to speak. A representative from Pete Buttigieg's campaign was also supposed to be there, but got stuck in a snowstorm.
South Dakota	Jan. 25	Rapid City	200+	SD West River March for Women; Central High School – Memorial Park Bandshell. After-march event at Rushmore Plaza Holiday Inn.
South Dakota		Sioux Falls	100	Multi-Cultural Center of Sioux Falls; a snow storm forced organizers to hold the rally indoors and forego a march to City Hall.
Tennessee		Bristol	couple dozen	2020 Women's March – Bristol TN/VA; Bristol Sign
Tennessee		Chattanooga	100	Chattanooga Women's Rally 2020, held at Miller Park (instead of Coolidge Park), suffered low turnout and a rift among dissatisfied protesters due to several factors: 1) the decision to hold a rally instead of a march, 2) rainy weather (as was the case the previous year), & 3) the invitation of none-too-progressive Tennessee politicians, such as Republican state Rep Robin Smith, to speak at the rally.
Tennessee		Johnson City	hundreds	Women's March Tri-Cities; King Commons – Founders Park
Tennessee	Sept. 20	Knoxville	100-150	In response to both lousy weather at the 2019 turnout and confusion sowed by Facebook trolls with fake event pages, Women's March Coalition of East Tennessee announced that their 2020 event, set for Chilhowee Park & Expo Center, would coincide with National Voter Registration Day, September 22. Just two nights prior, the group gathered at Krutch Park for a more somber occasion – a vigil for the recent passing of Justice Ruth Bader Ginsburg, less than seven weeks before the 2020 election.
Tennessee		Memphis	250+	Clayborn Temple – National Civil Rights Museum. Democratic U.S. Rep. Steve Cohen and former Shelby County Democratic Party chairman Corey Strong, a challenger to Cohen in the August Democratic primaries, were part of the march.
Tennessee		Murfreesboro	500	Power Together Women's March Tennessee, in its fourth year, shifted its official location from Nashville to Murfreesboro, with a rally & march at Civic Plaza, where they could "sustainably connect grassroots organizations to more Tennesseans on issues that matter to them the most." Many attended a Planned Parenthood workshop on protecting reproductive rights. 10 counterprotesters were present during the march.
Tennessee		Nashville	~50	In response to Power Together Tennessee's move to Murfreesboro, the Nashville Peace and Justice Center sponsored its own alternative event, The Nashville Women's Rally (no march included) at Public Square Park. This effort was made "not in competition with [the former event... but] in solidarity," in hopes of raising awareness about an upcoming August celebration of the centennial of women's suffrage.
Tennessee		Oak Ridge	dozens	To commemorate both the Women's March and the birthday of Dr. Martin Luther King, the 2nd Human Rights Rally in Oak Ridge was held at Oak Ridge Unitarian Universalist Church, followed by a march to First Presbyterian Church.
Texas		Abilene	~26	Women's March in the Key City; 555 Walnut St
Texas		Amarillo	~50	Sam Houston Park
Texas		Austin	3,500	Women's March ATX was held at the Texas State Capitol. Speakers included Austin City Council member Delia Garza (emcee), state Rep Celia Israel & (former) Democratic congressional candidate Wendy Davis.
Texas		Brownsville	0	The Valley Rising Rally; event planned at Linear Park, but cancelled due to bad weather.
Texas		Corpus Christi	75	US Rep Michael Cloud's office, Shoreline Blvd
Texas	Jan. 19	Dallas	1,000+	The 4th Dallas Women's March started Sunday afternoon at St. Paul United Methodist Church in the Arts District and made its way to Dallas City Hall.
Texas		Denton	200+	Courthouse-on-the-Square
Texas	Jan. 19	Fort Worth	1,000-2,000	Tarrant County Courthouse. Organizers originally hoped for around 5,000 attendees, compared with the actual 2020 estimate.
Texas	Jan. 25	Houston	few hundred	Houston Women March On (HWMO)'s 4th Annual March began at Cistern/Water Works near Buffalo Bayou Park, and ended at Houston City Hall (a change of destination from Eleanor Tinsley Park). US Rep Sheila Jackson Lee spoke at the rally.
Texas		Lubbock	~32	Tim Cole Memorial Park
Texas		San Antonio	hundreds	We Rise: San Antonio's 2020 Women's March; Travis Park – Alamo Plaza
Texas		Tyler	dozens	1st Women's March in Tyler; Downtown Square – Cathedral of Immaculate Conception
Utah		Kanab		event planned at Kane County Court House
Utah		Logan	~100	The Fourth Annual Women's March of Logan took place at the Historic Cache County Courthouse. The turnout was considerably bigger than the first year, plus the "March for Two" initiative was started to help the event include people who could not march due to disabilities or other reasons.
Utah		Provo	hundreds	Pioneer Park – Utah Historic Courthouse
Utah		Salt Lake City	several hundred	The SLC Womxn's March 2020, hosted by Missing and Murdered Indigenous Women (MMIW) of Utah Group, took place in Washington Square Park, and led to the State Capitol.
Utah	Jan. 25	St. George	dozens	Vernon Worthen Park. This year's rally placed emphasis on the importance of the passage of the Equal Rights Amendment.
Vermont		Castleton	few hundred	Womxn Rising Vermont took place indoors at Castleton University's Fine Arts Center. The keynote speaker, state Rep Summer Lee (D-PA) emphasized the importance of intersectional activism.
Virginia		Fredericksburg	13	event held at Spotsylvania Towne Centre
Virginia		Norfolk	0	The 4th Girls Take Granby Women's March was scheduled to take place on Waterside Drive, then got cancelled (according to its Facebook event page).
Virginia	Mar. 7	Roanoke	800	Roanoke's 2020 rally & march was held at Elmwood Park on the day before International Women's Day. Strong turnout was boosted by the excitement of presidential election season, despite the fact that, in the wake of Super Tuesday, Sens. Elizabeth Warren & Amy Klobuchar became the most recent female candidates to withdraw from the race for the Democratic nomination.
Virginia		Winchester	75	Shenandoah Valley Civil War Museum – Loudoun Street Mall
Washington		Bellingham	600	Bellingham Womxn's March; Bellingham City Hall; Mayor Seth Fleetwood & US Rep. Rick Larsen greeted the crowd.
Washington	(Mar. 7)	Bremerton	0	Empowering Womxn & Girls, an event planned by MeToo Kitsap and other organizations at Olympic College, was rescheduled by winter weather from January 19 to March 7, then postponed indefinitely due to the Coronavirus outbreak.
Washington		Forks		Forks Transit Center
Washington		Longview	65	Civic Circle Park; event hosted by Lower Columbia Indivisible
Washington		Mount Vernon	25	rally at Skagit County Courthouse; state Rep. Debra Lekanoff (D-Bow) was a speaker.
Washington	Mar. 8	Pasco	(dozens)	The Tri-Cities Women's March was held at Volunteer Park on International Women's Day
Washington		Port Townsend	300	Port Townsend's "Womxn's Wave" marched down Water Street, with impeachment of President Trump on the activists' minds and in their hopes; close on their heels came 15 Trump supporters carrying American flags and re-election signs.
Washington		Poulsbo		North Kitsap Women's March; event planned at Valley Nursery area SR 305 and Bond
Washington	Mar. 8	Seattle	~660 (online)	The Womxn's March on Seattle 2020, originally set for January 18 at Cal Anderson Park, suffered two setbacks. The outdoor event was first postponed by a harsh snow forecast and rescheduled for March 8 (International Women's Day), with a march route from Beacon Hill Playground to City Hall Park, then cancelled altogether because of the Coronavirus outbreak in King County. Seattle Womxn Marching Forward had to settle for hosting "The Next Revolutionaries" online, live-streaming the speeches that would have happened on the day of the march.
Washington		Spokane	1,000	Red Wagon Riverfront Park; The streets of Spokane were lined with opposing rallies – Walk for Life Northwest and Women's March with Planned Parenthood 2020.
Washington		Vancouver	hundreds	Esther Short Park
Washington		Wenatchee	250	Due to weather, the 3rd Annual Women's March in Wenatchee moved its starting rally from outdoors at Memorial Park to indoors at Numerica Performing Arts Center. Among the speakers at the podium was Washington State Attorney General Bob Ferguson, making his second attendance at the annual event. After the speeches and remarks, most of the crowd went outdoors again for the official march through downtown Wenatchee, along Mission Street and Chelan Avenue.
Washington		Yakima	150+	Unitarian Universalist Church of Yakima
West Virginia	Jan. 25	Beckley	5	A few members of Women's March WV held a small rally in support of a different cause, the global "No War with Iran" protest organized by Code Pink and the Answer coalition.
Wisconsin		Ashland	31	Rise Up: 2020 Women's March in Ashland; Bay Area Civic Center, Ashland Parks & Recreation – Alvord Theater, Northland College
Wisconsin		Hayward	30	public parking lot Hwy 63 and 27 – Sawyer County Courthouse
Wisconsin		Milwaukee	100	Women's March Wisconsin Day of Action; South Division High School (indoor event, due to weather)
Wisconsin		Sauk City	0	Sauk City Bridge, 836 Water St (event cancelled)
Wisconsin		Walworth		event planned at Village of Walworth Square
Wyoming		Cheyenne	~100	Cheyenne Depot Plaza – Wyoming State Capitol. State Rep Sara Burlingame spoke at the rally. Wildlife ecologist & University of Wyoming professor Merav Ben-David announced her candidacy for the open US Senate Seat held by retiring incumbent Mike Enzi.
Wyoming		Cody	several dozen	Bandshell, Cody City Park
Wyoming		Lander	100+	Mr. D's, 725 Main St. / Dairy Land Drive In – Centennial Park
Wyoming		Pinedale	7	Sublette County Women's March; event held at American Legion Park
Wyoming		Rock Springs	80	parking lot, B Street & Broadway – Rock Springs Library

== Worldwide ==
Listed below are marches outside the United States in support of the 2020 Women's March.

- Australia
- Belgium
- Brazil
- Bulgaria
- Canada
- Denmark
- France
- Germany
- Greece
- India
- Italy
- Japan
- Kenya
- Mexico
- Netherlands
- New Zealand
- Nigeria
- Norway
- Portugal
- Spain
- Switzerland
- Taiwan
- Thailand
- United Kingdom
- Zambia

Country	Date	Locations	Approximate attendance	Notes
Australia				With massive bushfires burning throughout the country, the Australian contingent of Women's March Global did not hold events in January 2020. Women's March Sydney released a statement directing people to donate to First Nations communities affected by the bushfires. Women's March Saskatoon began fundraising for the same charity in solidarity.
Belgium	Mar. 8	Brussels	6,300 - 10,000	Gare Centrale - Palais de Justice - Rue Royale
Brazil		São Paulo	at least 12	Avenida Paulista, 1568 – Bela Vista
Bulgaria		Sofia	10	Vitosha Boulevard
Canada		Bracebridge (ON) (was Huntsville)	14	Women's March Muskoka 2020; people gathered at Gagnon's grocery and marched along Wellington Street in the snow
Canada		Calgary (AB)	120	Womxn's March YYC; Calgary Central Library – City Hall (in bitter cold)
Canada		Cape Breton (NS)		Scotia Bank parking lot on the Esplanade – Civic Centre
Canada		Fredericton (NB)	100+	City Hall, 397 Queen Street – Wilmot United Church Hall
Canada		Goderich (ON)	28	Huron County's 3rd Women's March; Goderich Courthouse Square
Canada		Halifax (NS)	20	Halifax Grand Parade Square, before Cenotaph Monument, Barrington St
Canada		Hamilton (ON)	60+	A women's panel was held inside Hamilton City Hall.
Canada		Lion's Head (ON)	25	march along Main Street (in blizzard conditions)
Canada		North Bay (ON)	30+	North Bay City Hall – Amelia Rising Sexual Violence Support Centre
Canada		Ottawa (ON)	80	Women's March Ottawa hosted its first launch event indoors at Ottawa City Hall's Jean Pigott Place.
Canada		Port Dover (ON)	14	Riverfront Park – Lions Park Silver Lake Market
Canada		Regina (SK)	hundreds	Regina YWCA; hundreds turned out despite frigid temperatures (-30)
Canada		Saint John (NB)	160+	Kings Square South
Canada		Salmon Arm (BC)		City Hall
Canada		Sandy Cove (NS)		The Schoolhouse Cafe, 6203 Highway 217 – Digby Neck Volunteer Fire Department
Canada		Sarnia (ON)	80+	2020 Women's March: Sarnia-Lambton; Lambton Mall parking lot - Murphy Road
Canada		Saskatoon (SK)	~60	march begun at d'Lish by Tish Café, 14th Street East
Canada		Toronto (ON)	10	Nathan Phillips Square
Canada		Victoria (BC)	hundreds	Women's March 2020 Lekwungen & W̱sáneć Territories; Legislative Assembly of British Columbia
Canada		Waterloo (ON)	36+	Waterloo Public Square
Canada		Winnipeg (MB)	50-70	Manitoba Legislative Building
Denmark		Copenhagen		
France		Paris		Women's March Paris Roundtable "My Body My Rights / Mon Corps Mes Droits" planned at Columbia Global Centers (Reid Hall)
France		Montpellier	200	Place de la Comédie
Germany		Berlin		
Germany		Bonn	33	Münsterplatz 53111
Germany		Heidelberg	400	Friedrich-Ebert-Platz - town hall
Germany		Munich	24	Geschwister-Scholl-Platz
Greece		Athens	80+	Syntagma Square
India	Jan. 19	Guwahati		Assamese actress Barsha Rani Bishaya led an all-women rally on Sunday, January 19 to protest against the Citizenship (Amendment) Act (CAA).
Italy		Florence	70 - 150	Piazza di San Lorenzo
Italy		Rome		Piazza della Rotonda, in front of the Pantheon
Italy		Venice	10	San Maurizio Square
Japan	Jan. 17	Okinawa		1st Women's March in Okinawa; Tully's Coffee
Kenya		Isiolo	100+	
Mexico	Jan. 25	Ciudad Juárez	hundreds	A large group of demonstrators – mostly women, dressed in black and faces covered – assembled in downtown Juarez and marched on the Paso del Norte international bridge an hour later, prompting the closing of a major port of entry into El Paso, Texas for more than four hours. The marchers denounced the murders &/or disappearances of 180 women in Juarez over the past year, including a mural painter, Isabel Cabanillas, who was shot to death the previous week (on January 18, of all days).
Netherlands	Mar. 8	Amsterdam	thousands	3rd Women's March on Amsterdam; Dam Square
Netherlands	Mar. 8	Groningen	250	
Netherlands	Mar. 8	Maastricht	300	Vrijthof, Maastricht University
New Zealand	Jan. 19 & 25	Wellington		(1/19) Women's March for Peace and Climate Action; US Embassy Wellington / (1/25) Midland Park, 155 Lambton Quay
Nigeria		Ibadan		University of Ibadan
Nigeria		Lagos	at least 50	
Nigeria		Port Harcourt		Port Harcourt Town
Norway		Oslo	26+	Youngstorget
Portugal		Porto		Performance: As Mulheres Marcham; Rua Santa Catarina
Spain	Mar. 8	Palma de Mallorca	few hundred	The HUB Mallorca
Switzerland		Geneva	~500	Women's March Geneva & Zurich 2020; Île Rousseau
Taiwan	Mar. 8	Taipei		Due to the COVID-19 outbreak, Women's March Taiwan skipped any large-scale International Women's Day live event in favor of an online campaign, partnering with Moving Women Est. (MOWES), a local women's community center.
Thailand		Bangkok	20	Solidarity Rally for the Global Women's March; held at Ash Kickers Briskets & Bourbon2
Thailand		Chiang Mai		
United Kingdom		London	few hundred	Speaking to Power: Global Protest to #FightInequality; Richmond Terrace, Westminster
Zambia		Lusaka	100+	Global Platform Zambia, Great East Road, Kalundu
