= Kentucky's 36th House of Representatives district =

American legislative district

Kentucky's 36th State House of Representatives district
Representative
John Hodgson; R–Fisherville
since January 1, 2023
- Registration: 48.3% Republican; 39.0% Democratic; 12.1% No party preference
- Demographics: 77.2% White; 7.3% Black; 6.0% Hispanic; 5.8% Asian; 0.2% Native American; 0.3% Other; 3.2% Multiracial
- Population (2024): 46,157
- Registered voters (2026): 40,472

Kentucky's 36th House of Representatives district is one of 100 districts in the Kentucky House of Representatives. It comprises part of Jefferson County. It has been represented by John Hodgson (R–Fisherville) since 2023. As of 2024, the district had a population of 46,157.

== Voter registration ==
On January 1, 2026, the district had 40,472 registered voters, who were registered with the following parties.

Party	Registration	
Party	Voters	%
Republican	19,532	48.26
Democratic	15,775	38.98
Independent	2,888	7.14
Libertarian	208	0.51
Green	24	0.06
Constitution	16	0.04
Socialist Workers	5	0.01
Reform	3	0.01
"Other"	2,021	4.99
Total	40,472	100.00

== List of members representing the district ==
Member	Party	Years	Electoral history	District location
Claudia Riner (Louisville)	Democratic	January 1, 1978 – January 1, 1982	Elected in 1977. Reelected in 1979. Retired.	1974–1985; Jefferson County (part).
Tom Riner (Louisville)	Democratic	January 1, 1982 – January 1, 1985	Elected in 1981. Redistricted to the 41st district.	1974–1985; Jefferson County (part).
Lonnie Napier (Lancaster)	Republican	January 1, 1985 – January 1, 2013	Elected in 1984. Reelected in 1986. Reelected in 1988. Reelected in 1990. Reelected in 1992. Reelected in 1994. Reelected in 1996. Reelected in 1998. Reelected in 2000. Reelected in 2002. Reelected in 2004. Reelected in 2006. Reelected in 2008. Reelected in 2010. Retired.	1985–1993; Garrard, Jessamine (part), and Madison (part) Counties.
Lonnie Napier (Lancaster)	Republican	January 1, 1985 – January 1, 2013	Elected in 1984. Reelected in 1986. Reelected in 1988. Reelected in 1990. Reelected in 1992. Reelected in 1994. Reelected in 1996. Reelected in 1998. Reelected in 2000. Reelected in 2002. Reelected in 2004. Reelected in 2006. Reelected in 2008. Reelected in 2010. Retired.	1993–1997; Garrard, Jackson, Lincoln, Madison, and Pulaski Counties (parts).
Lonnie Napier (Lancaster)	Republican	January 1, 1985 – January 1, 2013	Elected in 1984. Reelected in 1986. Reelected in 1988. Reelected in 1990. Reelected in 1992. Reelected in 1994. Reelected in 1996. Reelected in 1998. Reelected in 2000. Reelected in 2002. Reelected in 2004. Reelected in 2006. Reelected in 2008. Reelected in 2010. Retired.	1997–2003
Lonnie Napier (Lancaster)	Republican	January 1, 1985 – January 1, 2013	Elected in 1984. Reelected in 1986. Reelected in 1988. Reelected in 1990. Reelected in 1992. Reelected in 1994. Reelected in 1996. Reelected in 1998. Reelected in 2000. Reelected in 2002. Reelected in 2004. Reelected in 2006. Reelected in 2008. Reelected in 2010. Retired.	2003–2015
Jonathan Shell (Lancaster)	Republican	January 1, 2013 – January 1, 2015	Elected in 2012. Redistricted to the 71st district.	2003–2015
Jerry T. Miller (Louisville)	Republican	January 1, 2015 – January 1, 2023	Elected in 2014. Reelected in 2016. Reelected in 2018. Reelected in 2020. Retired.	2015–2023
John Hodgson (Fisherville)	Republican	January 1, 2023 – present	Elected in 2022. Reelected in 2024. Reelected in 2026.	2023–present
