= Riner (surname) =

Riner is a surname. Notable people with the surname include:

- Claudia Riner (born 1948), American politician
- John Alden Riner (1850–1923), American judge
- Nicole Riner (born 1990), Swiss tennis player
- Teddy Riner (born 1989), French judoka
- Tom Riner (born 1946), American politician
- William A. Riner (1878-1955), American judge
