= Josie Raymond =

American politician

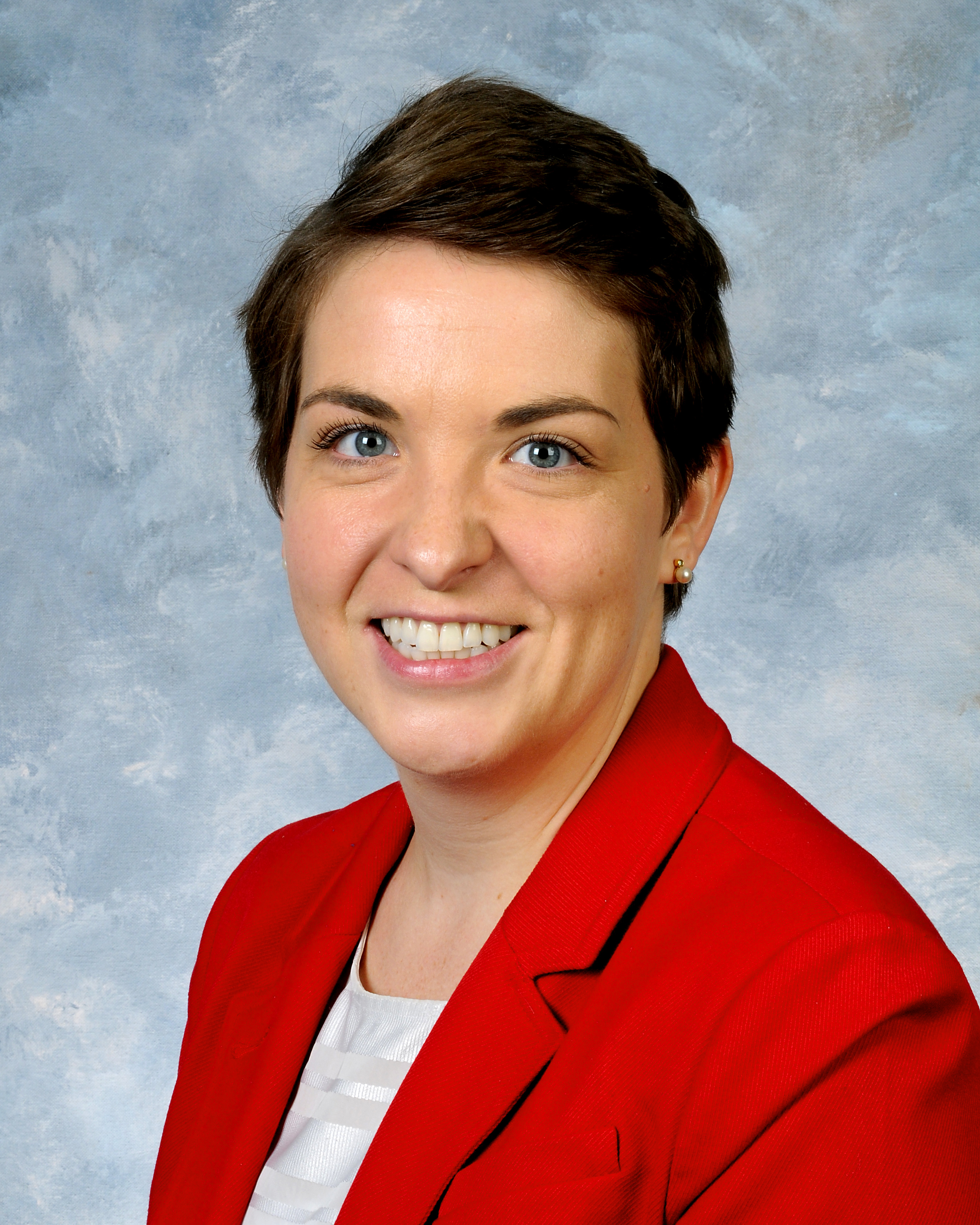

Member of the Louisville Metro Council
- Incumbent
- Assumed office January 9, 2025
- Preceded by: Pat Mulvihill
- Constituency: 10th District

Member of the Kentucky House of Representatives
- In office January 1, 2019 – January 1, 2025
- Preceded by: Steve Riggs
- Succeeded by: Mary Lou Marzian
- Constituency: 31st district (2019–2023); 41st district (2023–2025)

Personal details
- Born: May 29, 1985 (age 41)
- Party: Democratic
- Spouse: Adam
- Children: 3
- Education: Columbia University (BA, MS); Marian University (M.Ed.)

Josie Doll Raymond (born May 29, 1985) is an American politician. She is a Democrat who represented District 41 in the Kentucky House of Representatives. She previously represented District 31 until new boundaries were drawn during the 2022 election cycle. She did not seek reelection to the house in 2024, instead running for the Louisville Metro Council, in which she won and was sworn in on January 9, 2025.

== Early life ==
Raymond holds a Bachelor of Arts in Political Science and a Master of Science in Journalism from Columbia University, where she wrote for the campus newspaper, Columbia Daily Spectator. She also holds a Master of Arts in Teaching from Marian University. Her past experience includes working at the Student Success Center at the University of Louisville and with Teach for America.

== Political career ==
Raymond was elected to represent the 31st district in the Kentucky House of Representatives in 2018, replacing fellow Democrat Steve Riggs, who was retiring.

=== Electoral record ===
2024 general election: Louisville Metro Council, District 10
| Party | Candidate | Votes | % |
|---|---|---|---|
| Democratic | Josie Raymond | 9,309 | 100% |

2022 general election: Kentucky House of Representatives, District 41
| Party | Candidate | Votes | % |
|---|---|---|---|
| Democratic | Josie Raymond | 16,014 | 73.5% |
| Republican | Carrie Sanders McKehan | 5,782 | 26.5 |

2022 Democratic primary election: Kentucky House of Representatives, District 41
| Party | Candidate | Votes | % |
|---|---|---|---|
| Democratic | Josie Raymond | 3,753 | 77.5% |
| Democratic | Darryl Young Jr. | 1,088 | 22.5% |

2020 general election: Kentucky House of Representatives, District 31
| Party | Candidate | Votes | % |
|---|---|---|---|
| Democratic | Josie Raymond | 15,775 | 100% |

2018 general election: Kentucky House of Representatives, District 31
| Party | Candidate | Votes | % |
|---|---|---|---|
| Democratic | Josie Raymond | 10,512 | 59.7% |
| Republican | Leigh Boland Jones | 7,101 | 40.3% |

Kentucky House of Representatives
| Preceded by Steve Riggs | Member of the Kentucky House of Representatives from the 31st district 2019–2023 | Succeeded by Susan Tyler Witten |
| Preceded by Attica Scott | Member of the Kentucky House of Representatives from the 41st district 2023–2025 | Succeeded by Mary Lou Marzian |
