= Lonnie Napier =

American politician (1940–2023)

Member of the Kentucky House of Representatives from the 36th district
- In office January 1, 1985 – January 1, 2013
- Preceded by: Tom Riner (redistricting)
- Succeeded by: Jonathan Shell

Personal details
- Born: May 24, 1940
- Died: April 14, 2023 (aged 82) Lexington, Kentucky, U.S.
- Party: Republican
- Profession: Businessman, auctioneer, farmer

Lonnie Nelson Napier (May 24, 1940 – April 14, 2023) was an American politician from the Republican Party (GOP). Napier served from 1985 to 2013 in the Kentucky House of Representatives.

Known as "The Fox" to friends and foes alike, Napier began his political career in his native Garrard County, Kentucky, at age 26 with a term on the county's governing body, where he served from 1967 to 1969. Napier won the seat in 1984 following the state's redistricting. In 1971, Napier challenged veteran state Representative Joe Clarke for the 54th district state House seat, a race which he lost.

== Career ==
Napier won election to the Kentucky House of Representatives on November 6, 1984, having defeated his Democratic opponent by nearly a 2:1 margin, and was subsequently re-elected every two years. Napier served on the Appropriations and Revenue Committee, which enabled him to steer millions in state funds to his district over the years. In 2007, Napier was the target of an effort to draft him into the primary election for Kentucky Governor against embattled incumbent Ernie Fletcher. Napier announced in January 2007 that he would not be a candidate for governor but would instead run for Kentucky State Treasurer. Despite raising the most money out of the four candidates in the GOP primary for state Treasurer, Napier lost the nomination on May 22, 2007, to Melinda Wheeler. After running unopposed for several cycles, Napier was challenged in both the primary and general elections in 2010, but defeated both opponents by wide margins to win a fourteenth term. He did not seek reelection in 2012.

In addition to having a successful career in politics, Napier was also a small businessman, operating a clothing store in Lancaster (his hometown) as well as an auctioneering and real estate business.

== Personal life ==
Napier died in Lexington on April 14, 2023, at the age of 82.

== Some cities and towns represented ==
- Bryantsville
- Cartersvile
- Lancaster
- Paint Lick
- Berea
- Waco
- Red Lick
