= Claudia Riner =

American politician (born 1948)

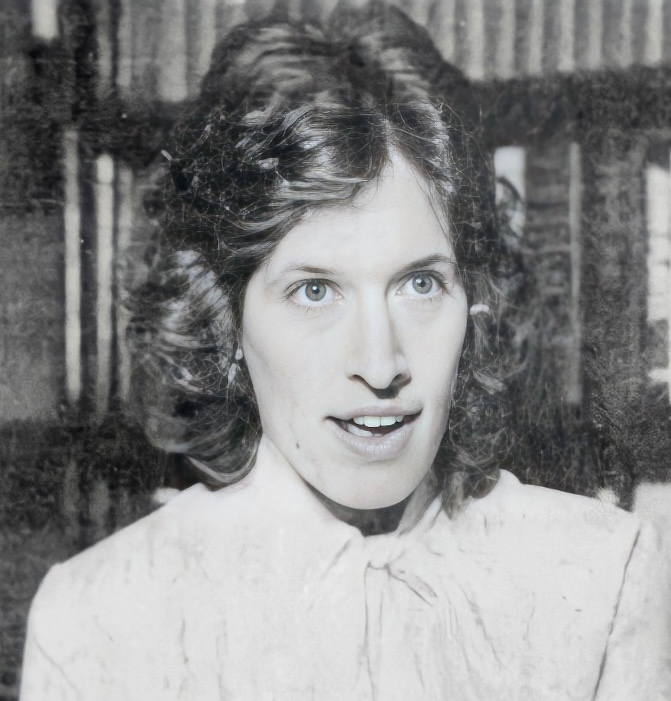
- Riner in 1980

Member of the Kentucky House of Representatives from the 36th district
- In office January 1, 1978 – January 1, 1982
- Preceded by: Michael W. Wooden
- Succeeded by: Tom Riner

Personal details
- Born: Claudia Badgett; April 23, 1948 (age 78)
- Party: Democratic (until 1972, since 1975)
- Other political affiliations: Republican (1972–1975)
- Spouse: Tom Riner (m. 1971)
- Children: 6

Claudia Riner (née Badgett, born April 23, 1948) is an American politician who served in the Kentucky House of Representatives from 1978 to 1981, representing the 36th district. She was the first woman from Madisonville, Kentucky, to hold high public office. Riner was characterized by colleagues in the legislature as a polarizing figure, due to her conservatism and religious activism, but she was also known as a persistent and adept legislator. She proposed multiple bills related to her Christian values, including her most well-known "Ten Commandments law", requiring that a copy of the Ten Commandments be posted in a plaque in every Kentucky classroom. She also proposed bills to teach creation science in public schools, ban the sale and distribution of pornography to minors, and require that misdemeanor offenders compensate their victims.

Claudia married Tom Riner in 1971; he was elected to replace her in the House in 1981, after she announced her retirement. Riner continued to engage in public life; she has served multiple terms as the legislative chair for the Democratic Party in Kentucky's 41st House of Representatives district, as well as vice chair of the Jefferson County Democratic Party.

== Personal life ==
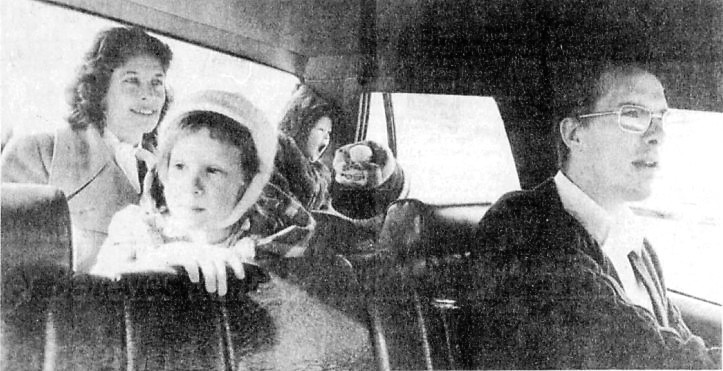
Riner and her children and husband, Tom Riner, in 1980

Claudia Rhea Badgett was born on April 23, 1948, to Russell Badgett Jr., a U.S. Army veteran and mine operator, and Juanita Wadlington Badgett, of Madisonville, Kentucky. She met Tom Riner in 1970 while at a "Crusade for Christ" at the University of Louisville. They married a year later; Claudia taught biology in Shelby County for a year before they moved to Louisville. The two have six children; she nursed and homeschooled all six. One of them was born while she was in office, although not during the House session. As of 2016, the Riners live in Louisville, where they have operated several religious and charitable organizations. In 1980, Sharon Reynolds with the Lexington Herald wrote that the Riners would run a "sort of soup kitchen/mission and quasi-rehabilitation center" for the poor out of their home, in that Claudia would cook breakfast for them while her husband gave religious counsel.

== Career ==
Riner formerly served as the head of the Louisville chapter of the Women Christian Temperance Union. She was a registered Democrat until 1972, when she re-registered as a Republican; she later said that she switched because she felt the Democratic Party no longer represented her. In 1974, Riner worked for the Kentucky Women's Committee to Rescind the ERA, the initialism referring to the Equal Rights Amendment. She was quoted in The Courier-Journal, advocating for the Kentucky legislature to retract their ratification of the ERA; Riner argued that "the special session did not allow enough time for an intensive study ... We are asking the legislators to take another chance to look at it". She also remarked that "man's law should be based upon God's law", and that God intended for differences between men and women. In 1975, a year and a half before running for a seat in the Kentucky House of Representatives from the 36th district, Riner re-registered as a Democrat.

Riner was first elected to the Kentucky House of Representatives in 1977 from the 36th district; she won the primary election against incumbent Democrat Michael W. Wooden with 52 percent of the vote, a margin of 73 votes. Wooden later blamed his loss on a direct-mail piece he claimed Riner sent out late in the campaign that linked the ERA—which Wooden supported—to abortion, which he opposed. Riner told The Courier-Journal that she planned to campaign in the general election on a platform of rescinding Kentucky's ratification of the ERA. Riner was already well known in the community; by the time of her primary victory, The Courier-Journal remarked that she had "won local recognition for her leadership in the anti-abortion movement". She won the general election against Republican opponent William F. Payne with 69 percent of the vote, making her the first woman from Madisonville to hold the office of state representative.

=== Kentucky House of Representatives ===
A conservative Christian, Claudia Riner was a polarizing figure during her time in the House. She was credited by fellow legislators, including the Democratic majority leader, for her political aptitude and persistence in pushing for bills she believes are morally necessary.

==== 1977–1979: First term ====
Riner is most well known for a law she wrote, requiring that a copy of the Ten Commandments be displayed on a plaque in every Kentucky public school classroom. The original proposal called for a 3 1/2 by 5 foot (1.1 by 1.5 meters) plaque, but a committee amendment reset the size at 16 by 20 inches (41 by 50.8 cm). In an attempt to satisfy the Establishment Clause, the bill carried a fine-print inscription, reading "the secular application of the Ten Commandants is clearly seen in its adoption as the fundamental legal code of Western Civilization and the Common Law of the United States". In addition, the bill opted for private funding of the plaques through evangelical and fundamentalist churches.

Riner and her husband campaigned for the bill vigorously. Within a week of taking office, she publicly set the measure as one of her highest priorities. The Riners, attending the Southern Baptist Convention as credentialed messengers, called for the convention to encourage posting of the Ten Commandments in classrooms in a formal motion. However, the motion was not considered; the convention's Credentials Committee voted to revoke the Riners' credentials, because their Logos Baptist Church was not considered affiliated with the denomination. The bill passed the legislature nearly unanimously; the opposition numbered four in the House and four in the Senate. In 1980, a legal challenge to the bill resulted in the bill getting struck down by the Supreme Court of the United States.

During her first term, Riner sponsored a measure to ban the distribution and sale of pornography to minors, which failed in a 5–4 committee vote; objecting members cited already-existing provisions in the law, the role of the state government, and police overreach. She also proposed a bill that would prevent Kentucky from regulating church schools, and her husband organized a rally at the Capitol building in favor of the measure.

According to The Courier-Journal, Tom Riner had a significant hand in Claudia's legislative operations throughout her tenure. During the campaign for her first term, they frequently portrayed themselves as a joint unit, using "we" to refer to themselves as the candidate—Tom remarked that "I feel like I have been elected ... we ran as a team. They got two for the price of one". Claudia even requested that Tom be given a seat in the House chamber, to no avail; he would sit in her chair when the House was not in session. This led other House members to refer to him as the "101st member" of the 100-member body. Indeed, the Riners jointly denied an accusation in 1978 that they distributed lesbian erotica in the House chamber in opposition to the ERA. The actual, professed originator was the chairwoman of Kentucky's STOP ERA organization. Claudia told the Lexington Herald in 1980 that she had received press inquiries on whether Tom controlled her voting patterns; she clarified that she sends a questionnaire around her district, the results of which determine her votes.

Riner had a tumultuous re-election campaign against primary challenger and credit analyst Michael Thomas; the election was Thomas's first run for office. The Democratic leadership in the district supported Thomas over Riner, nervous about her status as a conservative and former Republican; the Democratic Party chair in the district, Frank Quickert Jr., alleged that Riner was a Republican who "registered [Democratic] specifically to do as much damage to the Democratic Party as she could". Riner responded that the criticisms showed that her opposition could not find any issue with her voting record, commenting that "they can't criticize my voting record because my voting record reflects the district". Some Democrats alleged that Riner and her husband worked for Republican candidates in the 1976 United States elections; in particular, U.S. Representative Romano Mazzoli's challenger in Kentucky's 3rd congressional district, Republican Denzil Ramsey. Riner denied having done any political work for Republican candidates, although she did express dislike of Mazzoli. In the end, Riner beat Thomas in the primary with 58 percent of the vote.

==== 1979–1981: Second term ====
Riner proposed more bills in her second term; in March 1980, she pushed for a law to requiring schools teach creationism alongside evolution. The bill also required the state's textbook commission to make a list of textbooks teaching both disciplines. Despite persistent lobbying the night before the bill was up for vote in the House Rules Committee, the bill failed by just one vote. She also proposed a bill requiring those convicted of misdemeanors to compensate their victims.

In March 1981, Riner dropped out of her campaign for re-election to the Kentucky House of Representatives, allowing her husband, Tom, to run for the seat instead. The cited reason was that Claudia wished to take care of her six-year-old son, Nicky, who had been diagnosed with a learning disability a few days earlier. Riner indicated that she would serve the rest of her term—she had been planning to reintroduce legislation requiring public schools to teach creationism.

=== Later career ===
Riner continued engaging in politics after her term expired in the House. In 1989, she signed on to a letter criticizing the Supreme Court for striking down state bans on flag desecration. In June 1997, she and her husband purchased radio airtime to push for a congressional resolution opposing increased trade with China due to persecution of Christians. Four months later, Riner represented home schools in helping enact measure allowing police officers to arrest and transport truants. The measure came as part of a larger crime bill. In the run-up to the 2000 United States presidential election, Riner and her husband put up a sign at the church they operate; the sign read "Lieberman for President, Gore for Vice-President". The Democratic ticket for that year featured those names, only reversed; Gore was running for president, Lieberman for vice president. The Riners explained that they wanted Lieberman at the top of the ticket because as a senator, he condemned what he saw as President Bill Clinton's "immoral behavior".

In June 1988, Riner was selected as the chairwoman of Kentucky's 41st House of Representatives district for the local chapter of the Democratic Party. She was replaced by Russell Webber in June 1992, and was reinstated some time before 1998. She ran for the seat again in 2000, and initially won the April election against progressive challenger Jean Russell; however, the result was overturned by an independent official due to election irregularities, who recommended that the election be held again. A re-vote was scheduled by Nicki Patton, chairwoman of the Kentucky Democratic Party, but that vote was postponed when Riner spent over $30,000 airing radio advertisements in early June blaming gay rights activists for the overturning, claiming that "the gay-rights activists are trying to systematically eliminate mainline Democrats who don't go along with their agenda". Riner ran the ads in the hope that they would put pressure on local party leaders to side with her; Patton, however, publicly stated that "she's a disgruntled person because she didn't get her way". Patton also tried to persuade Riner to take a deal in which she could keep her seat if a new at-large seat was created for Russell. The deal was rejected by the county's party committee, but subsequently implemented by the state party.

By 2003, Riner was the vice chairwoman of the Jefferson County Democratic Party.

== Electoral history ==
1977 Kentucky's 36th House of Representatives district election
Primary election
Party	Candidate	Votes	%
Democratic	Claudia Riner	970	52.0%
Democratic	Michael W. Wooden (Incumbent)	897	48.0%
General election
Democratic	Claudia Riner	3,339	69.2%
Republican	William F. Payne	1,488	30.8%

1979 Kentucky's 36th House of Representatives district election
Primary election
Party	Candidate	Votes	%
Democratic	Claudia Riner	1,450	58.3%
Democratic	Michael Thomas	1,039	41.7%
General election
Democratic	Claudia Riner	2,990	70.1%
Republican	Stuart N. Pearlman	1,278	29.9%
