= Tim Hall (Kentucky politician) =

American politician

Member-elect of the Kentucky House of Representatives from the 31st district
- Assuming office January 1, 2027
- Succeeding: Susan Witten

Personal details
- Party: Democratic
- Website: Campaign website

Tim Hall is an American politician who is the member-elect for the 31st district of the Kentucky House of Representatives. He was elected at the 2026 election, unseating incumbent Republican Susan Witten. For 15 years he served as a member of Jeffersontown City Council.
