= Mark O'Brien (politician) =

American politician (1939–2021)

Member of the Kentucky House of Representatives from the 31st district
- In office January 1, 1974 – January 1, 1991
- Preceded by: Stanley A. Searcy
- Succeeded by: Steve Riggs

Personal details
- Born: March 3, 1939
- Died: May 19, 2021 (aged 82)
- Party: Democratic

Mark Donald O’Brien (March 3, 1939 – May 19, 2021) was an American politician from Kentucky who was a member of the Kentucky House of Representatives from 1974 to 1991. O’Brien was first elected in 1973, defeating incumbent Republican Stanley Searcy. He was defeated for renomination in 1990 by Steve Riggs.

O’Brien died on May 19, 2021.
