= Steve Riggs =

American politician (born 1959)

Member of the Kentucky House of Representatives from the 31st district
- In office January 1, 1991 – January 1, 2019
- Preceded by: Mark O'Brien
- Succeeded by: Josie Raymond

Personal details
- Born: June 8, 1959 (age 67) Louisville, Kentucky
- Party: Democratic
- Education: University of Kentucky

Military service
- Allegiance: United States
- Branch/service: United States Coast Guard Auxiliary
- Rank: Commander

Steven Ray Riggs (born June 8, 1959) is an American politician and a Democratic member of the Kentucky House of Representatives representing District 31 from 1991 to 2019. Riggs was elected to fourteen terms. Riggs was first elected to the house in 1990, defeating incumbent Democratic representative Mark O'Brien for renomination. He did not seek reelection in 2018.

== Education and background ==
Riggs earned his BBA from the University of Kentucky. He was first elected to the chamber in 1990. Riggs' professional experience includes working as an insurance agent and consultant. He also served as a Flotilla Commander in the United States Coast Guard Auxiliary.

Riggs served as chairman of the Local Government Committee with jurisdiction over cities, counties, and special districts. He was the senior ranking member of the Banking & Insurance Committee. Riggs was also named the President of the National Council of Insurance Legislators (NCOIL) in 2017.

== Elections ==
- 2012 Riggs was unopposed for the May 22, 2012 Democratic Primary and was unopposed for the November 6, 2012 General election, winning with 11,886 votes (57.6%) against Republican nominee Nicholas Simon.
- Early 1990s Riggs was initially elected in the 1990 Democratic Primary and the November 6, 1990 General election and re-elected in the general election of November 3, 1992.
- 1994 Riggs was unopposed for the 1994 Democratic Primary and won the November 8, 1994 General election against Republican nominee Michael Shaw.
- 1996 Riggs was unopposed for the 1996 Democratic Primary and the November 5, 1996 General election against Republican nominee Jim Kute.
- 1998 Riggs and returning 1996 Republican challenger Jim Kute were both unopposed for their 1998 primaries, setting up a rematch; Riggs won the November 3, 1998 General election against Kute.
- 2000 Riggs was unopposed for the 2000 Democratic Primary and won the November 7, 2000 General election with 11,401 votes (53.5%) against Republican nominee Stuart Benson.
- 2002 Riggs was unopposed for the 2002 Democratic Primary and won the November 5, 2002 General election with 9,225 votes (60.5%) against Republican nominee Darroll Hawkins.
- 2004 Riggs and returning 2002 Republican challenger Darroll Hawkins were both unopposed for their 2004 primaries, setting up a rematch; Riggs won the November 2, 2004 General election with 11,986 votes (57.7%) against Hawkins.
- 2006 Riggs was unopposed for both the 2006 Democratic Primary and the November 7, 2006 General election, winning with 11,053 votes after a challenger withdrew.
- 2008 Riggs was unopposed for both the 2008 Democratic Primary and the November 4, 2008 General election, winning with 15,505 votes.
- 2010 Riggs was unopposed for both the May 18, 2010 Democratic Primary and the November 2, 2010 General election, winning with 10,820 votes.
