= Kentucky's 31st House of Representatives district =

American legislative district

Kentucky's 31st State House of Representatives district
Representative
Susan Witten; R–Louisville
since January 1, 2023
- Registration: 46.9% Democratic; 40.3% Republican; 12.1% No party preference
- Demographics: 73.9% White; 8.7% Black; 5.3% Hispanic; 6.6% Asian; 0.1% Native American; 0.1% Other; 5.4% Multiracial
- Population (2024): 44,513
- Registered voters (2026): 35,124

Kentucky's 31st House of Representatives district is one of 100 districts in the Kentucky House of Representatives. It comprises part of Jefferson County. It has been represented by Susan Witten (R–Louisville) since 2023. As of 2024, the district had a population of 44,513.

== Voter registration ==
On January 1, 2026, the district had 35,124 registered voters, who were registered with the following parties.

Party	Registration	
Party	Voters	%
Democratic	16,467	46.88
Republican	14,166	40.33
Independent	2,194	6.25
Libertarian	172	0.49
Green	40	0.11
Constitution	13	0.04
Socialist Workers	6	0.02
Reform	1	0.00
"Other"	2,065	5.88
Total	35,124	100.00

== List of members representing the district ==
Member	Party	Years	Electoral history	District location
Mark O'Brien (Louisville)	Democratic	January 1, 1974 – January 1, 1991	Elected in 1973. Reelected in 1975. Reelected in 1977. Reelected in 1979. Reelected in 1981. Reelected in 1984. Reelected in 1986. Reelected in 1988. Lost renomination.	1974–1985; Jefferson County (part).
Mark O'Brien (Louisville)	Democratic	January 1, 1974 – January 1, 1991	Elected in 1973. Reelected in 1975. Reelected in 1977. Reelected in 1979. Reelected in 1981. Reelected in 1984. Reelected in 1986. Reelected in 1988. Lost renomination.	1985–1993; Jefferson County (part).
Steve Riggs (Louisville)	Democratic	January 1, 1991 – January 1, 2019	Elected in 1990. Reelected in 1992. Reelected in 1994. Reelected in 1996. Reelected in 1998. Reelected in 2000. Reelected in 2002. Reelected in 2004. Reelected in 2006. Reelected in 2008. Reelected in 2010. Reelected in 2012. Reelected in 2014. Reelected in 2016. Retired.	1985–1993; Jefferson County (part).
Steve Riggs (Louisville)	Democratic	January 1, 1991 – January 1, 2019	Elected in 1990. Reelected in 1992. Reelected in 1994. Reelected in 1996. Reelected in 1998. Reelected in 2000. Reelected in 2002. Reelected in 2004. Reelected in 2006. Reelected in 2008. Reelected in 2010. Reelected in 2012. Reelected in 2014. Reelected in 2016. Retired.	1993–1997; Jefferson County (part).
Steve Riggs (Louisville)	Democratic	January 1, 1991 – January 1, 2019	Elected in 1990. Reelected in 1992. Reelected in 1994. Reelected in 1996. Reelected in 1998. Reelected in 2000. Reelected in 2002. Reelected in 2004. Reelected in 2006. Reelected in 2008. Reelected in 2010. Reelected in 2012. Reelected in 2014. Reelected in 2016. Retired.	1997–2003
Steve Riggs (Louisville)	Democratic	January 1, 1991 – January 1, 2019	Elected in 1990. Reelected in 1992. Reelected in 1994. Reelected in 1996. Reelected in 1998. Reelected in 2000. Reelected in 2002. Reelected in 2004. Reelected in 2006. Reelected in 2008. Reelected in 2010. Reelected in 2012. Reelected in 2014. Reelected in 2016. Retired.	2003–2015
Steve Riggs (Louisville)	Democratic	January 1, 1991 – January 1, 2019	Elected in 1990. Reelected in 1992. Reelected in 1994. Reelected in 1996. Reelected in 1998. Reelected in 2000. Reelected in 2002. Reelected in 2004. Reelected in 2006. Reelected in 2008. Reelected in 2010. Reelected in 2012. Reelected in 2014. Reelected in 2016. Retired.	2015–2023
Josie Raymond (Louisville)	Democratic	January 1, 2019 – January 1, 2023	Elected in 2018. Reelected in 2020. Redistricted to the 41st district.	2015–2023
Susan Witten (Louisville)	Republican	January 1, 2023 – present	Elected in 2022. Reelected in 2024. Lost reelection.	2023–present
Tim Hall (Jeffersontown)	Democratic	Assuming office January 1, 2027	Elected in 2026.	2023–present
