= Mae Street Kidd =

American politician

- Born: February 8, 1904; Millersburg, Kentucky
- Died: October 20, 1999 (aged 95); Louisville, Kentucky
- Occupations: politician, civil rights activist
- Spouse(s): Horace Street (d. 1942); James Kidd (d. 1972)
- Parent(s): Anna Belle Leer, Charles Robert Jones

Member of the Kentucky House of Representatives from the 41st district
- In office January 1, 1968 – January 1, 1985
- Preceded by: Jesse P. Warders
- Succeeded by: Tom Riner

Mae Jones Street Kidd (February 8, 1904 – October 20, 1999) was an American businesswoman, civic leader, and a skilled politician in her home state of Kentucky. Raised by her African American mother and step-father after her white father refused to acknowledge her as his daughter, she had a distinguished career in insurance and public relations, served in the Red Cross during World War II, and was a member of the Kentucky House of Representatives from 1968 to 1984, representing District 41 (Louisville).

During her tenure in elective office, she was known for her sponsorship of landmark legislation. House Bill No. 27, which became law in 1972, created the Kentucky Housing Corporation (KHC), which promotes and finances low-income housing in the state. The bill was known in her honor as the "Mae Street Kidd Act."

In 1976, Representative Kidd also sponsored a successful resolution in the Kentucky General Assembly by which Kentucky officially ratified the United States Constitution's 13th Amendment (abolishing slavery), 14th Amendment (defining citizenship) and 15th Amendment (granting all men the right to vote regardless of race, color, or previous condition of servitude). Known collectively as the "Reconstruction Amendments," all three of those constitutional amendments had become law shortly after the conclusion of the Civil War, when a sufficient number of lawmakers in other states had ratified them. Until the unanimous vote in support of Representative Kidd's resolution, Kentucky had never ratified these Amendments.

== Biography ==
Kidd was born on February 8, 1904, in Millersburg, Kentucky, to Anna Belle Leer (1883–1984) and Charles Robert Jones (February 6, 1875 - March 15, 1972). Her mother, whom Kidd remembered as "a beautiful woman of mixed African, Indian, and white blood," was born on a farm in Harrison County, Kentucky, where her father, a white man, also lived as a farmer. Her older brother, George William Jones (July 18, 1901 - July 6, 1986), shared the same mother and father with Kidd. But Kidd knew little about the circumstances of her birth because, as she later recalled, "My mother never, ever mentioned my father." She learned about him from other older women in her community and only saw Jones one time while she was living as an adult in Louisville.

Kidd knew that her real father had married and begun a family of his own, "and they and their mother used to come visit my mother, who was very friendly with his white family," she recalled in a series of oral history interviews arranged into a memoir by author Wade Hall. "But I never wanted anything to do with them. I was hurt that he couldn't--or wouldn't--acknowledge me openly as his daughter. It was a painful part of my childhood, but I got over it."

Kidd spent her early years in Millersburg, a town in Bourbon County, Kentucky. As a girl she was called Minne Mae Jones. When she was two, her mother married an African American tobacco farmer, James W. (Willie) Taylor (1881–1959), who later became a chicken breeder. Kidd's mother, meanwhile, had a thriving catering business and often served as a local midwife.

Millersburg's blacks lived in a section of the town called Shippsville, and Kidd went to school there until the eighth grade. As a youngster, she realized that her light skin made it possible for her to skirt the Jim Crow laws that were a feature of life in the American South at the time: under these acts, blacks were restricted to certain schools, seating areas of public transportation, and even drinking fountains and rest rooms. She recalled that she liked to go into the Millersburg millinery shops and try on hats as a little girl, and pointed out that all in the town knew that she was of mixed heritage. Kidd's mother eventually moved the family to Millersburg proper after asking her cousin, who was white, to purchase the house and have the deed transferred to her.

Both Kidd's mother and stepfather worked hard to provide a solid home for the children, which included two more of their own: Kidd's half brother Webster Demetrius Taylor, and a half sister, Mary Evelyn Taylor. As a teenager, Kidd wanted to contribute to the household herself, but her mother refused to let her work for white families, telling her, "Mae, I have to serve other people because I don't have a choice. I want you to have a choice when you grow up." Since her school only went up to the eighth grade, it was decided that she would be sent away to the Lincoln Institute in Simpsonville, created to provide a better educational opportunity in the Jim Crow era. She was 15 years old when she left home in 1919, and spent two years there before her family's financial circumstances forced her to return home.

Kidd found a part-time job selling insurance as an independent sales agent for the Mammoth Life and Accident Insurance Company, a thriving, black-owned company based in Louisville. At the time, black-owned insurance companies were an important part of the African-American economy and some of the largest black-owned businesses of their era. Like black-owned banks, they served a community that was often discriminated against by mainstream American institutions. From 1921 to 1925 Kidd sold policies for Mammoth and collected premiums; to do so she walked all over the black neighborhoods in both Millersburg and a nearby city. "I never had any bad experiences anywhere because everybody knew my parents in Millersburg, and in Carlisle I soon became known and the older people began watching over me," she recalled, noting that she sometimes collected a hundred dollars in a day.

After four years as a salesperson, Kidd was offered a job at the Mammoth headquarters in Louisville as a file clerk. She shared an apartment in the Mammoth building with a friend, a young woman whose father was a board member of the insurance company. Kidd was thrilled to be supporting herself and living in a relatively large city, which was still a relative rarity for a single woman of any color in 1925. Louisville was still part of the South, however, and it did have unspoken boundaries. "I couldn't use the main public library," Kidd recalled. "I couldn't go to the first-run movie shows on Fourth Street."

After a time, Kidd was promoted to assistant bookkeeper, and then moved to the policy-issue office. In 1935 she became supervisor of policy issues, a job she held for eight years which entailed reviewing all applications for insurance that arrived at headquarters. By then Kidd had married Horace Street, a top Mammoth executive thirteen years her senior. Though much had changed in the years since her girlhood in Kentucky, Kidd still trod a fine line because of the color of her skin, even in the 1940s. Her husband refused to let her travel with him when Mammoth business took him to cities farther South, fearing an incident on the train or the refusal to be rented a hotel room, since Kidd was often mistaken for white. Street died of heart disease in 1942.

Kidd joined the American Red Cross in 1943 and was sent to England during World War II. There she served as assistant director of a service club for black American soldiers in Southampton. According to Wade Hall in his biography of Kidd, while traveling by train in her Red Cross uniform with her darker-complected brother in his Army uniform during World War II, Kidd was asked to move from the "colored" section of the train to the "white" section. Kidd repeatedly refused—and also refused to explain herself, later saying: "I was a grown woman. I was wearing my Red Cross uniform. My brother was a grown man, wearing his Army uniform. We were a brother and sister going to see our parents before we shipped overseas. We were both American citizens serving our country. We didn't owe anybody an explanation."

After the end of the war and her Red Cross duties in England, Kidd took a job in Portland, Maine, running its United Seaman's Service Club, a social gathering spot for merchant seamen. Though she was eager to return to Mammoth, she was uninterested in her former job in the policy office, and instead had gained valuable experience in both Maine and England in the relatively new field of public relations. Kidd studied on her own and designed a program for Mammoth. She made her proposal before the board, who voted to accept it, and was given her own office and a secretary. As the public relations counselor from 1946 to 1956, Kidd supervised all company communications and began a number of programs to create goodwill between policyholders and with the communities the company served. Her plan was so successful that she was hired by the National Negro Insurance Association to create a public-relations plan for all of its member companies. In 1948, Kidd also organized the first Louisville Urban League Guild and served as President of the Lincoln Foundation.

She married an American army officer, James Kidd—whom she met while overseas—and moved to Detroit, where he lived. For a time, she worked for a door-to-door cosmetics company, Fuller Projects, in both Detroit and Chicago. Kidd trained agents and sold the line herself, and quit after a time to run a campaign for a candidate running for a seat on the Detroit City Council. It was her first exposure to politics, and she drew heavily on her public-relations experience to help make the campaign a successful one.

When Kidd did return to Louisville, she was not given her former job as Mammoth's public-relations person. Instead she was forced to return to the ranks of company sales agents. Her boss, she recalled in an interview with Hall, "wanted to embarrass me by sending me back to selling ordinary insurance, but I embarrassed him by selling more insurance than anyone in the history of the company."

She retired from the company in 1966, at the age of 62. Much had changed since she began with Mammoth in the early 1920s, when it was one of several dozen such insurance companies that served the African-American community. "Unfortunately, with integration in the 1950s and 1960s, the white companies began opening up their policies to blacks, and blacks deserted their own companies in droves.... It's sad but true that this desertion by blacks of black insurance companies is just a part of a larger problem in the black community: we just don't have enough confidence in our own people to patronize each other."

== Public office ==
Two years later, at the dawn of a new civil rights era with federal laws barring racial discrimination in all forms, Kidd was invited by a number of Louisville Democrats to run for a seat in the House of Representatives in Kentucky General Assembly. She declined several times, but her husband thought it would be a good opportunity for her talents. So Kidd agreed, and won her first election after campaigning with a carload of neighborhood children, who helped her pass out flyers nightly in different sections of her Louisville district. "Their youth and energy boosted me when I was exhausted," she recalled. "They liked riding in my car and meeting people and being part of an important project."

Elected that fall, Kidd went to Frankfort and took her seat in Kentucky's General Assembly. She was one of just three African-Americans in the legislature at the time. The first bill she sponsored prohibited racial discrimination in housing. After several of Kentucky's cities passed their own local open-housing legislation in 1966 and 1967, Kidd worked with Senator Georgia Davis Powers and Representative Hughes McGill to introduce the Kentucky Fair Housing Act to the Kentucky General Assembly. Kidd's bill passed in 1968, making Kentucky the first Southern state to enact such laws on its own.

In the early 1970s, she sponsored a low-income housing bill that created a state agency to provide low-interest mortgages to first-time home buyers. Kidd struggled for some time to get this bill passed, and only with the election of a new governor in 1972 did she finally succeed in seeing it signed into law. She also sponsored a proposal to make the birthday of Dr. Martin Luther King Jr. an official state holiday. In her career in Kentucky's General Assembly, Representative Kidd's "firsts" also included being the first female on the Rules Committee.

Re-elected until 1984, when she lost after her district was gerrymandered several times, Kidd made civil rights her focus. In the mid-1970s she learned that Kentucky had voted against the 13th amendment in 1865 and never ratified the 13th, 14th and 15th amendments to the U.S. Constitution. These abolished slavery and gave U.S. citizenship and the vote to African Americans. It was a symbolic oversight, and Kidd was determined to correct it. She launched a campaign in 1976 to have the amendments officially ratified, and it passed unanimously. "It was especially important to me because I am a proud Kentuckian, and I didn't want that blot to remain on our history," she wrote in her memoir. Kidd also introduced a bill to make Dr. Martin Luther King Jr.'s birthday an official state holiday.

For a number of years, Kidd was a frequent presence in civil-rights marches and events in her state. She was also known for speaking her mind. Mervin Aubespin, associate editor of Louisville's Courier-Journal, told a reporter for the paper that early in her political career Kidd never hesitated to call the paper over its political coverage, especially when a reporter's article included quotes only from white males. "She would call up and say 'I was there and nobody asked me.' She raised holy sin.... She figured that people who voted for her needed to know what her position was on a number of issues that came through the legislature."

== End of career ==
Kidd was active in a number of charitable organizations throughout her life, including the Lincoln Foundation, which helped disadvantaged children at the facility that had once schooled her.

Toward the end of her life, she lost her eyesight. She died in Louisville on October 20, 1999.

Her biography, based on nearly 40 oral history interviews by Wade Hall, appeared two years before her death, and its title, Passing for Black, reflected her mixed heritage and the conflicts she often experienced because of it. "Most of us, whether white or black, are mixtures of many races and nationalities," she pointed out. "We all have tangled roots." She noted that though times had changed considerably, her childhood was particularly difficult. She likened it to "living in a no-man's-land where I belonged to neither race. Because I was neither completely white nor completely black, I've been stigmatized and penalized by both races."

== Awards ==
The National Association for the Advancement of Colored People presented to her its Unsung Heroine Award at a National NAACP Women's Conference, and she received a Louisville Mayor's Citation for Outstanding Community Service. She also received a Top Ten Outstanding Kentuckians Award; and the Humanitarian Service Award from the United Cerebral Palsy Association.

== See also ==
- Georgia Davis Powers
- Bert T. Combs
