= Kentucky Housing Corporation =

State housing agency of Kentucky, U.S.

Kentucky Housing Corporation (KHC), the Kentucky state housing agency, was created by the 1972 Kentucky General Assembly to provide affordable housing opportunities. KHC is a self-supporting, public corporation.

== Background ==
=== 1970s ===
Kentucky Housing Corporation was created in 1972 as a state housing finance agency by the General Assembly under the Mae Street Kidd Act with a $150,000 appropriation. In 1973, KHC originated its first bond issue totaling $51.2 million and received its first allocation from the United States Department of Housing and Urban Development (HUD) for 623 Section 8 New Construction units totaling $1.9 million in 1975. In-house mortgage loan underwriting and the Kentucky Appalachian Housing Programs were established in 1976.

In 1978, the debt ceiling was raised by the General Assembly from $400 million to $700 million.

KHC purchased Wheelwright, Kentucky, an abandoned coal company town in eastern Kentucky, to rehab and resell housing to its residents in 1979.

=== 1980s ===
KHC's debt ceiling was raised to $1.125 billion by the General Assembly in 1982. The first Governor's Housing Conference was held in 1984 and grants for two programs were developed, Energy Repairs for the Elderly and Training for Affordable Construction. Three new KHC programs were added in 1985, Senior and Special Needs Housing Program, Homeownership Trust Fund for 1–6 percent loans, and the Kentucky Indoor Plumbing Program. In that same year, KHC purchased property at 1225 and 1231 Louisville Road in Frankfort, Kentucky, to construct a new office building.

In 1987, the Housing Foundation, a 501(c)(3) nonprofit, was established to attract charitable contributions for affordable housing. Also in 1987, KHC was appointed to administer the federal Low-Income Housing Tax Credit Program for Kentucky. KHC created an in-house Loan Servicing program in 1989.

=== 1990s ===
In 1990, KHC's "Yes You Can" (homeownership education course) and Rental Deposits Surety Programs were developed. KHC became the first state Housing Finance Agency (HFA) to receive AAA bond credit rating from Standard & Poor's in 1991 and began administering the Family Self-Sufficiency Program.

In 1992, the Affordable Housing Trust Fund (AHTF) was established by the General Assembly, without a designated permanent funding source, to serve the state's lowest-income population with critical housing needs. KHC began administering all federal McKinney–Vento Homeless Assistance Act homeless funding programs in 1993 and received a $400,000 grant from HUD in 1994 for the HOPE Rental Assistance Program.

The Housing Policy Advisory Committee was created by the General Assembly in 1996 to establish state policy on housing issues. In 1997, KHC contributed to the Jimmy Carter Work Project, Hammering in the Hills, and participated with Habitat for Humanity in eastern Kentucky including sponsorship of two house builds. In 1998, KHC provided housing assistance to 253 households rendered homeless by the 1997 Ohio River Valley flood. Later that year, the AHTF received allocation of unclaimed lottery winnings in excess of $6 million annually received by the General Assembly for the next biennium. In 1999, KHC received a HUD grant of $290,281 to expand homeownership education and counseling programs and the AHTF was funded by unclaimed lottery winnings totaling $5.8 million.

=== 2000–2005 ===
In 2000, the General Assembly raised KHC's debt ceiling to $2.5 billion, as well as continued the allocation of unclaimed lottery winnings for the AHTF for another two years.

Morehead State University was contracted in 2001 to conduct a statewide homeless study and the University of Louisville was contracted to conduct a statewide housing needs assessment. KHC's Board of Directors adopted a universal design policy to require building concepts that support minimal alteration to accommodate changing needs of current and future residents. Also in 2001, the First Appalachian Housing Summit was hosted by Kentucky Housing Corporation in Prestonsburg, Kentucky.

In 2002, KHC was one of eight state HFAs selected to participate in the National Homeless Policy Academy by HUD and the United States Department of Health and Human Services. The General Assembly adopted federal income guidelines in qualifying home buyers rather than using the lower state income guidelines. KHC's Board of Directors also raised the maximum home purchase price from $99,000 to $144,000.

The AHTF received funds of $6.2 million designated by the General Assembly following discontinuance of the lottery appropriation in 2003. Also in 2003, KHC received a grant for $454,280 from the Corporation for Supportive Housing to integrate state systems, help establish 532 units of supportive housing, and increase awareness of the need for supportive housing.

In 2004, KHC established regional offices. Also, KHC's Renaissance Kentucky program named Hodgenville, Kentucky, as the 100th participating community and the National Council of State Housing Agencies (NCSHA) recognized KHC for the HouseWorks program.

Governor Ernie Fletcher launched Recovery Kentucky in 2005 to reduce chronic homelessness for drug and alcohol addicted Kentuckians and charged KHC with the administration of the program. A new Housing Choice Voucher to Homeownership program was started for Section 8 rental assistance participants and a statewide, Don’t Borrow Trouble task force was established to raise awareness of predatory lending.

=== 2006–2010 ===
In 2006, Kentucky's Ten-Year Plan to End Chronic Homelessness was unveiled by Governor Fletcher, legislation establishing a permanent funding source for AHTF was passed by the General Assembly, and Hurricane Katrina victims were helped by KHC with housing assistance. That same year, KHC had $500 million in more than 5,000 home loans and raised the maximum home purchase price to $200,000 and the income level up to $90,440.

Ground was broken for seven Recovery Kentucky centers in 2006 and supportive housing was provided to 776 individuals who were victims of domestic violence, persons with mental illness, and homeless families, through the new Safe Havens program designed to help end chronic homelessness.

KHC celebrated its 35th anniversary in 2007. Lee Square, a 27-home community renovation project in Bowling Green, was also opened. A Recovery Kentucky center development broke ground in Owensboro, Kentucky, and another center opened in Henderson, Kentucky. A new Scholar House development broke ground in Bowling Green and another was under construction in Louisville.

In 2008, Governor Steve Beshear established the Recovery Kentucky Task Force to further help Kentuckians through the Recovery Kentucky program. Three Recovery Kentucky centers opened in Florence, Morehead, and Richmond. The Kentucky Homeownership Protection Center was created by the General Assembly to help homeowners avoid foreclosure, which absorbed the Don’t Borrow Trouble task force. KHC participated with the federal Housing and Economic Recovery Act of 2008, created to address the subprime mortgage crisis. KHC's bond ceiling was increased from $2.5 billion to $5 billion. HUD awarded a record $17.2 million in grants to help fund 76 homeless programs. The first two Scholar House facilities opened in Louisville and Owensboro. Staff conducted the KHC Listening Tour to learn of local affordable housing needs across the state.

In 2009, in conjunction with the American Recovery and Reinvestment Act of 2009, KHC launched Kentucky's Housing and Emergency Assistance Reaching The Homeless program in addition to the Tax Credit Assistance, Tax Credit Monetization, and Weatherization Assistance Programs. Also, the Kentucky Homeownership Protection Center received a $1.5 million grant to provide counseling services. Two Recovery Kentucky centers were opened in Erlanger and Harlan and a Scholar House opened in Bowling Green.

In 2010, KHC hit historic lows for interest rates.

== Funding ==
A portion of KHC's funds comes from the interest earned through the sale of tax-exempt mortgage revenue bonds. KHC also operates through the receipt of fees for administering federal programs including rental assistance that makes housing available to low-income Kentuckians.

== Programs/Functions ==
KHC's programs and/or functions include rental housing and home production financing, homeownership, education and/or counseling towards homeownership, rental assistance, housing rehabilitation, home repair initiatives, loan servicing, special needs housing, and ending homelessness initiatives.

== Leadership ==
=== Board of directors ===
KHC is governed by a 15-member Board of Directors consisting of ten private members appointed by the governor who represent designated interests in affordable housing (home construction industry, nonprofit housing organizations, financial institutions, consumers, financial professionals, local government, real estate practitioners, state building trades council, homeless, and manufactured housing). The private members serve four-year terms. The five public members are state government officials whose participation on the Board is part of the responsibilities of their positions (lieutenant governor, attorney general, secretary of the Finance and Administration Cabinet, secretary of the Economic Development Cabinet, and the commissioner of the Department for Local Government).

Regular meetings of the Board of Directors will be held at KHC's offices in Frankfort, Kentucky, unless otherwise designated by the Board. There are three standing committees of the Board (Executive, Finance, and Communications) that meet on an as-needed basis. The public and press are notified of all meetings in accordance with the Kentucky Open Meetings Law.
