= Susan Witten =

American politician (born 1970)

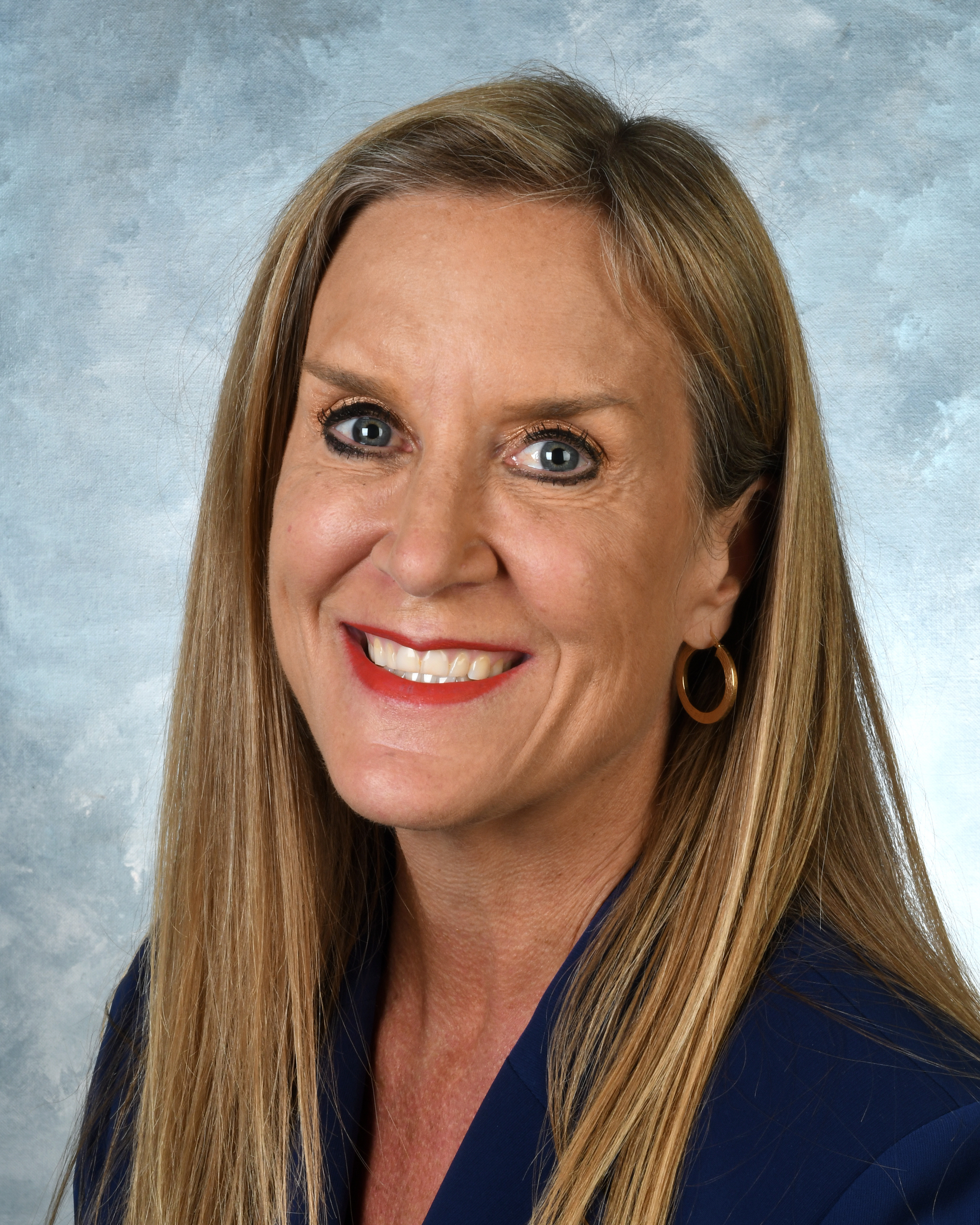

Member of the Kentucky House of Representatives from the 31st district
- Incumbent
- Assumed office January 1, 2023
- Preceded by: Josie Raymond
- Succeeded by: Tim Hall (elect)

Personal details
- Born: June 12, 1970 (age 56)
- Party: Republican
- Education: Transylvania University (BA)
- Committees: Health Services; Small Business & Information Technology; State Government

Susan Tyler Witten (born July 12, 1970) is an American politician who has served as a Republican member of the Kentucky House of Representatives since January 2023. She represents Kentucky's 31st House district which comprises part of Jefferson County. Witten was defeated for reelection in 2026, losing to Democratic candidate Tim Hall.

== Background ==
Witten grew up in Jefferson County following her families move to Douglass Hills in 1971. She graduated from Eastern High School before attending Transylvania University where she was a member of the tennis and swim teams. She earned a Bachelor of Arts in business management in 1992.

She is employed as the Regional Lighting and Energy Specialist by Consolidated Electrical Distributors (CED).

Witten and her husband currently reside in Jeffersontown. She is a Christian.

== Political career ==
=== Elections ===
In 2022, Incumbent Democratic representative Josie Raymond was redistricted into the 41st House district. Witten filed to run for the open 31st House district seat on January 19, one day before the new district maps were to go into effect. Witten's candidacy was contested by Sue Foster, the Democratic nominee for the 31st House district, due to Witten as well as her two signatories residing outside of the district whenever they filed their paperwork. On October 19, Jefferson County Circuit Court Judge Annie O'Connell agreed with Foster and ruled that Witten be disqualified from the ballot. On October 28, judge Pamela R. Goodwine of the Kentucky Court of Appeals overturned Judge O'Connell's decision and reinstated Witten to the ballot.

- 2022 Witten won the 2022 Republican primary with 2,769 votes (76.3%) against opponent Flint Breckenridge, and won the 2022 Kentucky House of Representatives election with 10,095 votes (52%) against Democratic candidate Sue Foster. Witten assumed office on January 1, 2023.
- 2024 Witten was unopposed in the 2024 Republican primary and won the 2024 Kentucky House of Representatives election with 12,067 votes (50.7%) against Democratic candidate Colleen Davis.
- 2026 Witten was unseated in the 2026 Kentucky House of Representatives election by Democrat Tim Hall.

Kentucky House of Representatives
Preceded by Josie Raymond	Member of the Kentucky House of Representatives; 2023–present	Succeeded by incumbent
