= Ryne =

Ryne is an English masculine given name. Notable people with the given name include:

- Ryne Duren (1929–2011), American baseball player
- Ryne Harper (born 1989), American baseball player
- Ryne Nelson (born 1998), American baseball pitcher
- Ryne Douglas Pearson (born 1964), American novelist, screenwriter, and YouTube cooking show host
- Ryne Robinson (born 1984), American football wide receiver
- Ryne Sanborn (born 1989), American architect, ice hockey player, and former actor
- Ryne Sandberg (1959–2025), American baseball player, coach, and manager
- Ryne Stanek (born 1991), American baseball player
