= Attica Scott =

American politician (born 1972)

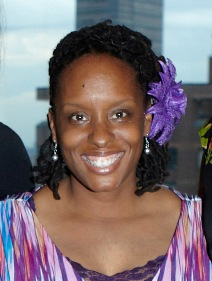
- Scott in 2011

Member of the Kentucky House of Representatives from the 41st district
- In office January 1, 2017 – January 1, 2023
- Preceded by: Tom Riner
- Succeeded by: Josie Raymond

Member of Louisville Metro Council from the 1st district
- In office October 13, 2011 – January 1, 2015
- Preceded by: Judy Green
- Succeeded by: Jessica Green

Personal details
- Born: January 30, 1972 (age 54) Louisville, Kentucky, U.S.
- Party: Democratic
- Other political affiliations: Democratic Socialists of America
- Education: Knoxville College (BA); University of Tennessee (MA)
- Website: Campaign website

Attica Woodson Scott (born January 30, 1972) is an American politician who served as a member of the Kentucky House of Representatives from the 41st district from 2017 to 2023.

== Early life and education ==
Scott was born in Louisville, Kentucky, and attended duPont Manual High School. She earned a Bachelor of Arts in political science from Knoxville College and a Master of Arts in communications from the University of Tennessee.

== Career ==
=== Activism ===
Before her appointment to Louisville Metro Council, Scott was a community organizer for 15 years and worked as a coordinator for Kentucky Jobs with Justice, working on migrant rights, health care, and racial inequality.

=== Louisville Metro Council ===
The Louisville Metro Council selected Scott to replace Judy Green, who was removed from the council for ethics violations, in 2011. She won a special election to fill the remainder of Green's term in 2012, but lost her reelection in 2014 to Jessica Green, Judy's daughter.

=== Kentucky House ===
In 2016, Scott ran for the Kentucky House, defeating Democratic incumbent Tom Riner in the primary election. She was unopposed in the general election on November 8, 2016, and became the first African American woman to serve in the Kentucky General Assembly since 2000. Her committee assignments include Elections, Constitutional Amendments & Intergovernmental Affairs, Judiciary, Natural Resources & Energy, and Education.

In 2020, Scott supported the Maternal Care Access and Reducing Emergencies Act, a bill to improve maternal health. She sponsored House Bill 54, which would remove the tax on certain baby products, such as diapers, wipes, baby bottles, nipples for the bottles, and bottle liners.

=== U.S. House ===
On July 7, 2021, Scott announced her candidacy for U.S. representative for Kentucky's 3rd congressional district, a seat held by Kentucky's sole Democratic U.S. representative, John Yarmuth. On October 12, Yarmuth announced his decision to retire. Consequently, Kentucky Senate Minority Leader Morgan McGarvey entered the race.

== Breonna Taylor protests ==
In late May and June 2020, Scott marched during protests in Louisville after the shooting of Breonna Taylor. During the protest she made accusations of excessive use of force against protesters by law enforcement, stating that she and her daughter, along with other protesters, were sprayed with tear gas without warning by police during the protest. She was critical of Kentucky Governor Andy Beshear's decision to send in the Kentucky National Guard to support Louisville Metro Police in controlling protesters; called for Louisville Mayor Greg Fischer's resignation, claiming that the public had lost confidence in his ability to address police brutality; and demanded that Louisville police be held accountable in the shooting deaths of Breonna Taylor and David McAtee.

On September 24, 2020, Scott was arrested in Louisville during protests, but before the start of the curfew, and spent the night in jail. With 17 others, Scott was charged with felony first-degree rioting, misdemeanor failure to disperse and misdemeanor unlawful assembly. The charge of rioting was dismissed on October 6 and the misdemeanor charges were dropped on November 16. On June 14, 2021, Scott filed a lawsuit against Louisville Metro Police alleging her arrest violated her constitutional rights to due process and equal protection and inflicted severe emotional distress.

== Personal life ==
Scott is a single mother and has two children, one of whom was arrested with her at a protest in Louisville in late 2020 and later cleared of all charges.

== Electoral history ==
Louisville Metro Council District 1 Democratic Primary Election, 2012
| Party | Candidate | Votes | % |
|---|---|---|---|
| Democratic | Attica Scott (incumbent) | 1,232 | 48.77 |
| Democratic | Ray Barker | 622 | 24.62 |
| Democratic | Steve Colston | 248 | 9.82 |
| Democratic | Janis Carter Miller | 219 | 8.67 |
| Democratic | Rosa Macklin | 205 | 8.12 |
| Total votes | | 2,526 | 100.0 |

Louisville Metro Council District 1 Democratic Primary Election, 2014
| Party | Candidate | Votes | % |
|---|---|---|---|
| Democratic | Jessica Green | 1,711 | 55 |
| Democratic | Attica Scott (incumbent) | 1,400 | 45 |
| Total votes | | 3,111 | 100.0 |

Kentucky House of Representatives District 41 Democratic Primary Election, 2016
| Party | Candidate | Votes | % |
|---|---|---|---|
| Democratic | Attica Scott | 3,504 | 54.23 |
| Democratic | Tom Riner (incumbent) | 2,005 | 31.03 |
| Democratic | Phillip Baker | 952 | 14.74 |
| Total votes | | 6,461 | 100.0 |

Kentucky House of Representatives District 41 General Election, 2016
| Party | Candidate | Votes | % |
|---|---|---|---|
| Democratic | Attica Scott | 13,257 | 100 |
| Total votes | | 13,257 | 100.0 |

Kentucky House of Representatives District 41 General Election, 2018
| Party | Candidate | Votes | % |
|---|---|---|---|
| Democratic | Attica Scott (incumbent) | 10,933 | 100 |
| Total votes | | 10,933 | 100.0 |

Kentucky House of Representatives District 41 General Election, 2020
| Party | Candidate | Votes | % |
|---|---|---|---|
| Democratic | Attica Scott (incumbent) | 13,993 | 100 |
| Total votes | | 13,993 | 100.0 |

Kentucky 3rd Congressional District Democratic Primary, 2022
| Party | Candidate | Votes | % |
|---|---|---|---|
| Democratic | Morgan McGarvey | 52,157 | 63.34% |
| Democratic | Attica Scott | 30,183 | 36.66% |
| Total votes | | 82,340 | 100.0% |

Kentucky Senate District 33 Democratic Primary, 2024
| Party | Candidate | Votes | % |
|---|---|---|---|
| Democratic | Gerald Neal | 4,854 | 55.31% |
| Democratic | Attica Scott | 3,460 | 39.43% |
| Democratic | Michael W. Churchill Jr. | 462 | 5.26% |
| Total votes | | 8,776 | 100.0% |
