= Tom Riner =

American politician

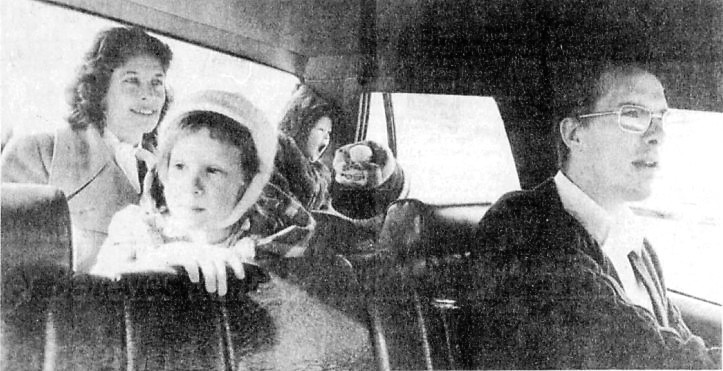
- Riner (right) with children and wife Claudia Riner in 1980

Member of the Kentucky House of Representatives
- In office January 1, 1982 – January 1, 2017
- Preceded by: Claudia Riner
- Succeeded by: Attica Scott
- Constituency: 36th district (1982–1985); 41st district (1985–2017)

Personal details
- Born: October 7, 1946 (age 79) Louisville, Kentucky, U.S.
- Party: Democratic
- Spouse: Claudia
- Education: Centre College (BA)

Thomas N. Riner (born October 7, 1946) is an American politician and pastor who served as a Democratic member of the Kentucky House of Representatives for the 41st District from 1982 until 2017. He was defeated by Attica Scott in the 2016 Democratic primary for the seat. The New York Times once wrote regarding Tom's stance of political discourse, "He looks for God everywhere, and in places he does not find him, he tries to put him there."

== Kentucky House of Representatives ==
Riner connected Rowan County Clerk Kim Davis, then under prosecution for defying a federal court order to issue marriage licenses to same-sex couples, with Evangelical legal team Liberty Counsel.

An anti-revenge porn bill sponsored by Riner and fellow Democrat Joni Jenkins passed the Kentucky House unanimously.

=== Disputed statute ===
In 2006, Riner sponsored a Kentucky law which could subject a staff member of Kentucky Homeland Security to a Class A Misdemeanor (carrying a 12-month prison sentence) if they fail to affirm the existence of an almighty God. The Kentucky Supreme Court has refused to review the constitutionality of the law, though a dissenting opinion was recorded by Judge Ann O'Malley, stating that while the organization "American Atheists lacked standing based on its claim for damages," statute KRS 39A.285 nonetheless "places an affirmative duty to rely on Almighty God for the protection of the Commonwealth," which would put it in contention with the Lemon Test.

The bill became law in 2008. American Atheists have asked the US Supreme court to review the constitutionality of the law.

== Personal life ==
Tom Riner and his wife, former State Representative Claudia Riner, live in Louisville, Kentucky.

Kentucky House of Representatives
| Preceded by Claudia Riner | Member of the Kentucky House of Representatives from the 36th district 1982–1985 | Succeeded by Lonnie Napier |
| Preceded by Mae Street Kidd | Member of the Kentucky House of Representatives from the 41st district 1985–2017 | Succeeded by Attica Scott |
