= Fisherville, Louisville =

Neighborhood in Louisville, Kentucky

Coordinates: 38°11′28″N 85°28′17″W

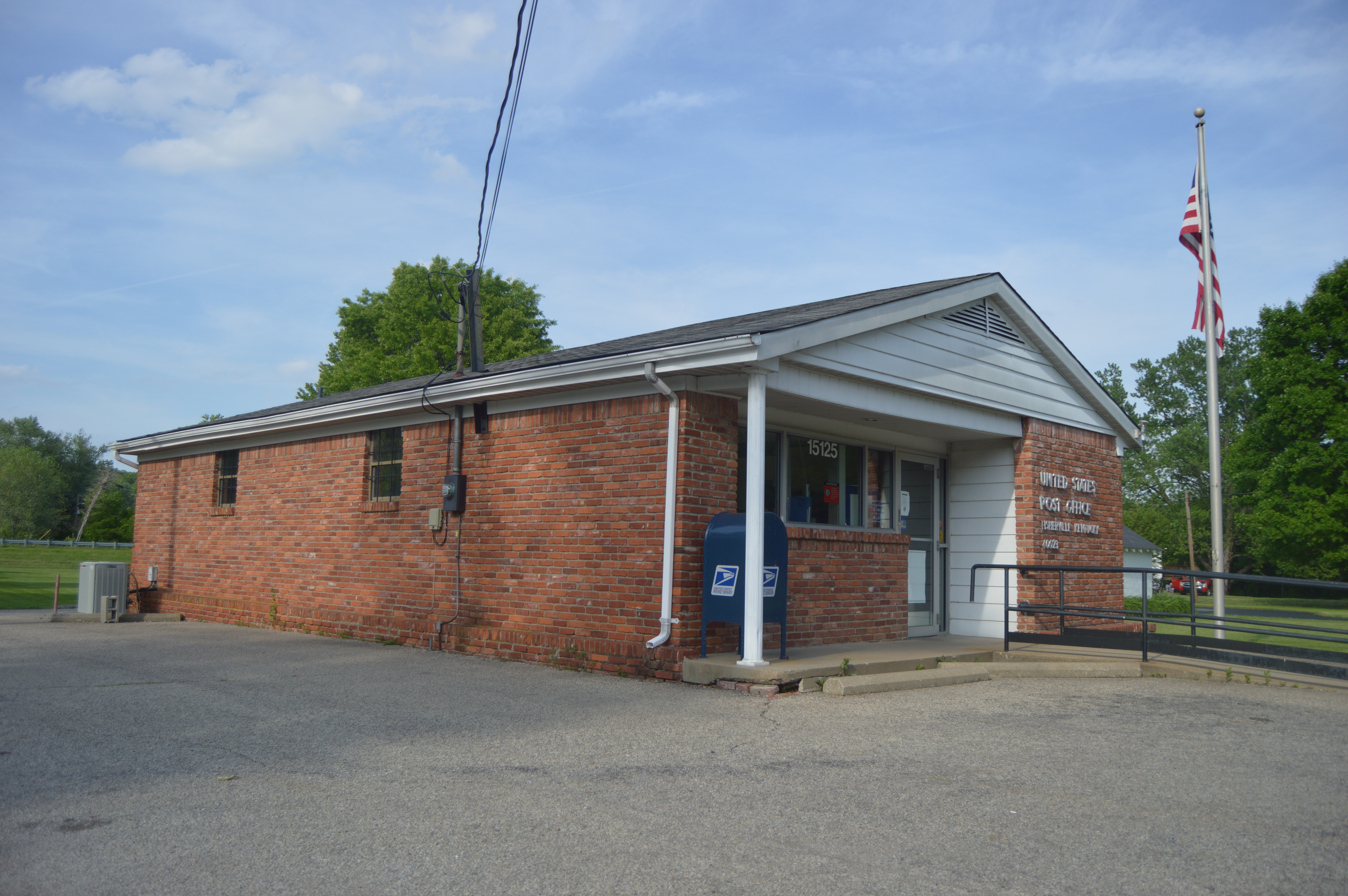
Fisherville's post office

Fisherville is a neighborhood of Louisville, Kentucky, United States, which is centered along Taylorsville Road and Finchville Road. It was originally named Curreys after Edward Currey, who opened a post office in 1833. In 1847, it was renamed after Robert Fisher who had died two years earlier and operated a mill on Floyds Fork with his father, John. The area became more commercial in the late 19th and early 20th centuries due to the opening of railroad tracks and the discovery of a mineral water well. Visitors came for the therapeutic value of the mineral water, but when the well went dry in 1914 the area began its reversion to being a primarily residential area. Fisherville was also home of one of Louisville's great Basketball coaches, Denny Crum, who coached for the University of Louisville for 30 years attaining 2 Men's Basketball Championships.
