= Wyner =

Wyner is a surname. Notable people with the surname include:

- Aaron D. Wyner (1939–1997), American information theorist
- George Wyner (born 1945), American actor
- Irv Wyner (1904–2002), American film score composer
- Yehudi Wyner (born 1929), American composer, pianist, conductor, and music educator
