= Kentucky's 41st House of Representatives district =

American legislative district

Kentucky's 41st State House of Representatives district
Representative
Mary Lou Marzian; D–Louisville
since January 1, 2025
- Registration: 65.1% Democratic; 22.3% Republican; 11.9% No party preference
- Demographics: 82.6% White; 5.5% Black; 5.6% Hispanic; 1.4% Asian; 0.1% Native American; 0.3% Other; 4.5% Multiracial
- Population (2024): 48,358
- Registered voters (2026): 37,948

Kentucky's 41st House of Representatives district is one of 100 districts in the Kentucky House of Representatives. It comprises part of Jefferson County. It has been represented by Mary Lou Marzian (D–Louisville) since 2025. As of 2024, the district had a population of 48,358.

== Voter registration ==
On January 1, 2026, the district had 37,948 registered voters, who were registered with the following parties.

Party	Registration	
Party	Voters	%
Democratic	24,689	65.06
Republican	8,456	22.28
Independent	2,430	6.40
Libertarian	199	0.52
Green	53	0.14
Socialist Workers	17	0.04
Constitution	8	0.02
Reform	4	0.01
"Other"	2,092	5.51
Total	37,948	100.00

== List of members representing the district ==
Member	Party	Years	Electoral history	District location
Mae Street Kidd (Louisville)	Democratic	January 1, 1968 – January 1, 1985	Elected in 1967. Reelected in 1969. Reelected in 1971. Reelected in 1973. Reelected in 1975. Reelected in 1977. Reelected in 1979. Reelected in 1981. Lost renomination.	1964–1972; Jefferson County (part).
Mae Street Kidd (Louisville)	Democratic	January 1, 1968 – January 1, 1985	Elected in 1967. Reelected in 1969. Reelected in 1971. Reelected in 1973. Reelected in 1975. Reelected in 1977. Reelected in 1979. Reelected in 1981. Lost renomination.	1972–1974; Jefferson County (part).
Mae Street Kidd (Louisville)	Democratic	January 1, 1968 – January 1, 1985	Elected in 1967. Reelected in 1969. Reelected in 1971. Reelected in 1973. Reelected in 1975. Reelected in 1977. Reelected in 1979. Reelected in 1981. Lost renomination.	1974–1985; Jefferson County (part).
Tom Riner (Louisville)	Democratic	January 1, 1985 – January 1, 2017	Redistricted from the 36th district and reelected in 1984. Reelected in 1986. Reelected in 1988. Reelected in 1990. Reelected in 1992. Reelected in 1994. Reelected in 1996. Reelected in 1998. Reelected in 2000. Reelected in 2002. Reelected in 2004. Reelected in 2006. Reelected in 2008. Reelected in 2010. Reelected in 2012. Reelected in 2014. Lost renomination.	1985–1993; Jefferson County (part).
Tom Riner (Louisville)	Democratic	January 1, 1985 – January 1, 2017	Redistricted from the 36th district and reelected in 1984. Reelected in 1986. Reelected in 1988. Reelected in 1990. Reelected in 1992. Reelected in 1994. Reelected in 1996. Reelected in 1998. Reelected in 2000. Reelected in 2002. Reelected in 2004. Reelected in 2006. Reelected in 2008. Reelected in 2010. Reelected in 2012. Reelected in 2014. Lost renomination.	1993–1997; Jefferson County (part).
Tom Riner (Louisville)	Democratic	January 1, 1985 – January 1, 2017	Redistricted from the 36th district and reelected in 1984. Reelected in 1986. Reelected in 1988. Reelected in 1990. Reelected in 1992. Reelected in 1994. Reelected in 1996. Reelected in 1998. Reelected in 2000. Reelected in 2002. Reelected in 2004. Reelected in 2006. Reelected in 2008. Reelected in 2010. Reelected in 2012. Reelected in 2014. Lost renomination.	1997–2003
Tom Riner (Louisville)	Democratic	January 1, 1985 – January 1, 2017	Redistricted from the 36th district and reelected in 1984. Reelected in 1986. Reelected in 1988. Reelected in 1990. Reelected in 1992. Reelected in 1994. Reelected in 1996. Reelected in 1998. Reelected in 2000. Reelected in 2002. Reelected in 2004. Reelected in 2006. Reelected in 2008. Reelected in 2010. Reelected in 2012. Reelected in 2014. Lost renomination.	2003–2015
Tom Riner (Louisville)	Democratic	January 1, 1985 – January 1, 2017	Redistricted from the 36th district and reelected in 1984. Reelected in 1986. Reelected in 1988. Reelected in 1990. Reelected in 1992. Reelected in 1994. Reelected in 1996. Reelected in 1998. Reelected in 2000. Reelected in 2002. Reelected in 2004. Reelected in 2006. Reelected in 2008. Reelected in 2010. Reelected in 2012. Reelected in 2014. Lost renomination.	2015–2023
Attica Scott (Louisville)	Democratic	January 1, 2017 – January 1, 2023	Elected in 2016. Reelected in 2018. Reelected in 2020. Redistricted to the 42nd district and retired to run for Kentucky's 3rd congressional district.	2015–2023
Josie Raymond (Louisville)	Democratic	January 1, 2023 – January 1, 2025	Redistricted from the 31st district and reelected in 2022. Retired to run for the Louisville Metro Council.	2023–present
Mary Lou Marzian (Louisville)	Democratic	January 1, 2025 – present	Elected in 2024. Reelected in 2026.	2023–present
