= 1996 Kentucky Senate election =

- November 5, 1996

19 out of 38 seats in the Kentucky Senate 20 seats needed for a majority
	Majority party	Minority party	Third party
Leader	Larry Saunders	Dan Kelly	John A. Rose
Party	Coalition	Republican	Democratic
Leader since	January 7, 1997	November 12, 1994	January 5, 1993
Leader's seat	37th – Louisville	14th – Springfield	28th – Winchester
Last election	–	17	21
Seats won	5	18	15
Seat change	▲5	▲1	▼6
Seats up	–	7	12
Races won	–	8	11
- Results: Democratic hold Coalition gain Republican hold Republican gain No election Popular vote: 50–60% 60–70% >90% 50–60% 60–70% 70–80% >90%
Senate President before election
John A. Rose
Democratic
Elected Senate President
Larry Saunders
Coalition government

The 1996 Kentucky Senate election was held on November 5, 1996. The Republican and Democratic primary elections were held on May 28. Half of the senate (all odd-numbered seats) were up for election. Despite the Democratic Party maintaining a majority of 20 seats, five members joined all 18 Republicans to elect Larry Saunders the President of the Senate. This gave Republicans effective control of the Senate for the first time since 1920.

A numbered map of the senate districts at the time can be viewed here.

== Overview ==
Party	Candidates		Votes	%	Seats			
Party	Opposed	Unopposed	Votes	%	Before	Won	After	+/−
Democratic	16	2	322,901	54.23	21	11	20	-1
Republican	16	1	272,485	45.77	17	8	18	+1
Total	32	3	595,386	100.00	38	19	38	±0
Source: Kentucky Secretary of State

== Retiring incumbents ==
One senator retired, who did not run for another office. Additionally, Mike Moloney resigned from the senate on July 31, 1996.

1. 15th: James D. Crase (Somerset): Retired.

== Incumbents defeated ==
Two incumbents lost renomination in the primary election, and two incumbents lost reelection in the general election.

=== In the primary election ===
==== Democrats ====
Two Democrats lost renomination.

1. 17th: Charlie Berger (first elected in 1979) lost renomination to Glenn Freeman, who won the general election.
2. 31st: Kelsey E. Friend Sr. (first elected in 1971) lost renomination to Gary C. Johnson, who won the general election.

==== Republicans ====
No Republicans lost renomination.

=== In the general election ===
==== Democrats ====
One Democrat lost reelection to a Republican.

1. 23rd: Joseph U. Meyer (first elected in 1988) lost to Jack Westwood.

==== Republicans ====
One Republican lost reelection to a Democrat.

1. 29th: John David Preston (elected in 1994) lost a redistricting race to fellow incumbent Benny Ray Bailey.

== Summary by district ==
Certified results by the Kentucky Secretary of State are available online for the primary election and general election.

† – Incumbent not seeking re-election

District	Incumbent	Party	Elected	Party
1	Jeff Green	Dem	Jeff Green	Dem
3	Joey Pendleton	Dem	Joey Pendleton	Dem
5	Virgil Moore	Rep	Virgil Moore	Rep
7	Lindy Casebier	Rep	Lindy Casebier	Rep
9	Richard "Richie" Sanders	Rep	Richard "Richie" Sanders	Rep
11	Richard L. "Dick" Roeding	Rep	Richard L. "Dick" Roeding	Rep
13	Vacant		Ernesto Scorsone	Dem
15	James D. Crase†	Rep	Vernie McGaha	Rep
17	Charlie Berger	Dem	Glenn Freeman	Dem
19	Tim Shaughnessy	Dem	Tim Shaughnessy	Dem
21	Albert L. Robinson	Rep	Albert L. Robinson	Rep
23	Joseph U. Meyer	Dem	Jack Westwood	Rep
25	John David Preston	Rep	Robert Stivers	Rep
27	Walter "Doc" Blevins	Dem	Walter "Doc" Blevins	Dem
29	Benny Ray Bailey	Dem	Benny Ray Bailey	Dem
31	Kelsey E. Friend Sr.	Dem	Gary C. Johnson	Dem
33	Gerald A. Neal	Dem	Gerald A. Neal	Dem
35	David K. Karem	Dem	David K. Karem	Dem
37	Larry Saunders	Dem	Larry Saunders	Dem

== Closest races ==
Seats where the margin of victory was under 10%:

1. District 5, 2.48%
2. District 7, 4.36%
3. District 25, 5.44%
4. District 17, 5.87%
5. District 23, 8.50% (gain)

== Special elections ==
=== District 9 special ===
Results by county: Sanders: 60–70%; 70–80%; >90%; Dickinson: 50–60%; 60–70%

Richard "Richie" Sanders was elected in June 1996 following the resignation of Walter Arnold Baker.

1996 Kentucky Senate 9th district special election
Party	Candidate	Votes	%
Republican	Richard "Richie" Sanders	6,908	58.6
Democratic	John "Jake" D. Dickinson	4,889	41.4
Total votes		11,797	100.0
Republican hold			

=== District 13 special ===
§ Special election

== District 1 ==
Incumbent senator Jeff Green won reelection unopposed.

=== Democratic primary ===
==== Candidates ====
===== Nominee =====
- Jeff Green, incumbent senator

=== General election ===
==== Results ====
1996 Kentucky Senate 1st district election
Party	Candidate	Votes	%
Democratic	Jeff Green (incumbent)	Unopposed	
Total votes		23,679	100.0
Democratic hold			

== District 3 ==
Incumbent senator Joey Pendleton won reelection, defeating Republican John Young.

=== Democratic primary ===
==== Candidates ====
===== Nominee =====
- Joey Pendleton, incumbent senator

=== Republican primary ===
==== Candidates ====
===== Nominee =====
- John Young

=== General election ===
==== Results ====
1996 Kentucky Senate 3rd district election
Party	Candidate	Votes	%
Democratic	Joey Pendleton (incumbent)	13,043	55.6
Republican	John Young	10,416	44.4
Total votes		23,459	100.0
Democratic hold			

== District 5 ==
Incumbent senator Virgil Moore won reelection, defeating Democrat Joe M. Hager.

=== Democratic primary ===
==== Candidates ====
===== Nominee =====
- Joe M. Hager

===== Eliminated in primary =====
- Harold E. Davidson

==== Results ====
Democratic primary results
Party	Candidate	Votes	%
Democratic	Joe M. Hager	3,455	66.9
Democratic	Harold E. Davidson	1,706	33.1
Total votes		5,161	100.0

=== Republican primary ===
==== Candidates ====
===== Nominee =====
- Virgil Moore, incumbent senator

=== General election ===
==== Results ====
1996 Kentucky Senate 5th district election
Party	Candidate	Votes	%
Republican	Virgil Moore (incumbent)	16,738	51.2
Democratic	Joe M. Hager	15,928	48.8
Total votes		32,666	100.0
Republican hold			

== District 7 ==
Incumbent senator Lindy Casebier won reelection, defeating Democrat Charles W. Miller.

=== Democratic primary ===
==== Candidates ====
===== Nominee =====
- Charles W. Miller

===== Eliminated in primary =====
- Dennis Mitchell

==== Results ====
Democratic primary results
Party	Candidate	Votes	%
Democratic	Charles W. Miller	4,068	51.4
Democratic	Dennis Mitchell	3,848	48.6
Total votes		7,916	100.0

=== Republican primary ===
==== Candidates ====
===== Nominee =====
- Lindy Casebier, incumbent senator

=== General election ===
==== Results ====
1996 Kentucky Senate 7th district election
Party	Candidate	Votes	%
Republican	Lindy Casebier (incumbent)	19,929	52.2
Democratic	Charles W. Miller	18,263	47.8
Total votes		38,192	100.0
Republican hold			

== District 9 ==
Incumbent senator Richard "Richie" Sanders won reelection, defeating Democrat John "Jake" D. Dickinson.

=== Democratic primary ===
==== Candidates ====
===== Nominee =====
- John "Jake" D. Dickinson

=== Republican primary ===
==== Candidates ====
===== Nominee =====
- Richard "Richie" Sanders, incumbent senator

=== General election ===
==== Results ====
1996 Kentucky Senate 9th district election
Party	Candidate	Votes	%
Republican	Richard "Richie" Sanders (incumbent)	19,632	60.6
Democratic	John "Jake" D. Dickinson	12,777	39.4
Total votes		32,409	100.0
Republican hold			

== District 11 ==
Incumbent senator Richard L. "Dick" Roeding won reelection, defeating Democrat Sandra Easton.

=== Democratic primary ===
==== Candidates ====
===== Nominee =====
- Sandra Easton

=== Republican primary ===
==== Candidates ====
===== Nominee =====
- Richard L. "Dick" Roeding, incumbent senator

=== General election ===
==== Results ====
1996 Kentucky Senate 11th district election
Party	Candidate	Votes	%
Republican	Richard L. "Dick" Roeding (incumbent)	28,604	66.2
Democratic	Sandra Easton	14,595	33.8
Total votes		43,199	100.0
Republican hold			

== District 13 ==
Incumbent senator Mike Moloney resigned from the senate in July 1996. He was succeeded by Democrat Ernesto Scorsone, who was elected in both the regular election and a special election for the remainder of Moloney's term.

=== Democratic primary ===
==== Candidates ====
===== Nominee =====
- Ernesto Scorsone, representative from the 75th district (1985–1996)

=== Republican primary ===
==== Candidates ====
===== Nominee =====
- N. Mitchell Meade

=== General election ===
==== Results ====
1996 Kentucky Senate 13th district election
Party	Candidate	Votes	%
Democratic	Ernesto Scorsone	18,262	61.1
Republican	N. Mitchell Meade	11,639	38.9
Total votes		29,901	100.0
Democratic hold			

=== Special election ===
==== Results ====
1996 Kentucky Senate 13th district special election
Party	Candidate	Votes	%
Democratic	Ernesto Scorsone	14,533	60.0
Republican	N. Mitchell Meade	9,686	40.0
Total votes		24,219	100.0
Democratic hold			

== District 15 ==
Incumbent senator James D. Crase did not seek reelection. He was succeeded by Republican Vernie McGaha.

=== Democratic primary ===
==== Candidates ====
===== Nominee =====
- Gene Daniels

=== Republican primary ===
==== Candidates ====
===== Nominee =====
- Vernie McGaha

===== Eliminated in primary =====
- S. David Carr
- Larry Sears Nichols
- William J. Wilson Jr.

==== Results ====
Republican primary results
Party	Candidate	Votes	%
Republican	Vernie McGaha	4,836	51.5
Republican	William J. Wilson, Jr.	1,665	17.7
Republican	S. David Carr	1,531	16.3
Republican	Larry Sears Nichols	1,355	14.4
Total votes		9,387	100.0

=== General election ===
==== Results ====
1996 Kentucky Senate 15th district election
Party	Candidate	Votes	%
Republican	Vernie McGaha	23,733	72.8
Democratic	Gene Daniels	8,845	27.2
Total votes		32,578	100.0
Republican hold			

== District 17 ==
Incumbent Democratic senator Charlie Berger was defeated for renomination by Glenn Freeman.

=== Democratic primary ===
==== Candidates ====
===== Nominee =====
- Glenn Freeman

===== Eliminated in primary =====
- Bill Blair Baird
- Charlie Berger, incumbent senator

==== Results ====
Democratic primary results
Party	Candidate	Votes	%
Democratic	Glenn Freeman	6,011	51.8
Democratic	Charlie Berger (incumbent)	4,162	35.9
Democratic	Bill Blair Baird	1,421	12.3
Total votes		11,594	100.0

=== Republican primary ===
==== Candidates ====
===== Nominee =====
- J. C. Ausmus III

===== Eliminated in primary =====
- Johnnie Lloyd Turner

==== Results ====
Republican primary results
Party	Candidate	Votes	%
Republican	J. C. Ausmus III	2,286	59.6
Republican	Johnnie Lloyd Turner	1,548	40.4
Total votes		3,834	100.0

=== General election ===
==== Results ====
1996 Kentucky Senate 17th district election
Party	Candidate	Votes	%
Democratic	Glenn Freeman	14,520	52.9
Republican	J. C. Ausmus III	12,909	47.1
Total votes		27,429	100.0
Democratic hold			

== District 19 ==
Incumbent senator Tim Shaughnessy won reelection, defeating Republican Barbara "Bobbie" Holsclaw.

=== Democratic primary ===
==== Candidates ====
===== Nominee =====
- Tim Shaughnessy, incumbent senator

=== Republican primary ===
==== Candidates ====
===== Nominee =====
- Barbara "Bobbie" Holsclaw

=== General election ===
==== Results ====
1996 Kentucky Senate 19th district election
Party	Candidate	Votes	%
Democratic	Tim Shaughnessy (incumbent)	24,198	59.3
Republican	Barbara "Bobbie" Holsclaw	16,632	40.7
Total votes		40,830	100.0
Democratic hold			

== District 21 ==
Incumbent senator Albert L. Robinson won reelection, defeating primary election challengers.

=== Republican primary ===
==== Candidates ====
===== Nominee =====
- Albert L. Robinson, incumbent senator

===== Eliminated in primary =====
- Michael Dean
- Helen Jackson

==== Results ====
Republican primary results
Party	Candidate	Votes	%
Republican	Albert L. Robinson (incumbent)	3,694	62.0
Republican	Michael Dean	1,578	26.5
Republican	Helen Jackson	688	11.5
Total votes		5,960	100.0

=== General election ===
==== Results ====
1996 Kentucky Senate 21st district election
Party	Candidate	Votes	%
Republican	Albert L. Robinson (incumbent)	Unopposed	
Total votes		20,450	100.0
Republican hold			

== District 23 ==
Incumbent senator Joseph U. Meyer was defeated for reelection by Republican Jack Westwood.

=== Democratic primary ===
==== Candidates ====
===== Nominee =====
- Joseph U. Meyer, incumbent senator

=== Republican primary ===
==== Candidates ====
===== Nominee =====
- Jack Westwood

===== Eliminated in primary =====
- Joyce M. Macke
- Joe Mattioli

==== Results ====
Republican primary results
Party	Candidate	Votes	%
Republican	Jack Westwood	1,172	50.1
Republican	Joe Mattioli	706	30.2
Republican	Joyce M. Macke	460	19.7
Total votes		2,338	100.0

=== General election ===
==== Results ====
1996 Kentucky Senate 23rd district election
Party	Candidate	Votes	%
Republican	Jack Westwood	16,429	54.3
Democratic	Joseph U. Meyer (incumbent)	13,854	45.7
Total votes		30,283	100.0
Republican gain from Democratic			

== District 25 ==
Incumbent senator John David Preston was redistricted to the 29th district and was succeeded by Robert Stivers.

=== Democratic primary ===
==== Candidates ====
===== Nominee =====
- Charles M. Derrickson

=== Republican primary ===
==== Candidates ====
===== Nominee =====
- Robert Stivers

=== General election ===
==== Results ====
1996 Kentucky Senate 25th district election
Party	Candidate	Votes	%
Republican	Robert Stivers	14,027	52.7
Democratic	Charles M. Derrickson	12,579	47.3
Total votes		26,606	100.0
Republican hold			

== District 27 ==
Incumbent senator Walter "Doc" Blevins won reelection, defeating Republican Randy Memmer.

=== Democratic primary ===
==== Candidates ====
===== Nominee =====
- Walter "Doc" Blevins, incumbent senator

=== Republican primary ===
==== Candidates ====
===== Nominee =====
- Randy Memmer

===== Eliminated in primary =====
- Mary "Candy" Parker
- Duane Porter

==== Results ====
Republican primary results
Party	Candidate	Votes	%
Republican	Randy Memmer	1,118	43.0
Republican	Duane Porter	1,038	40.0
Republican	Mary "Candy" Parker	441	17.0
Total votes		2,597	100.0

=== General election ===
==== Results ====
1996 Kentucky Senate 27th district election
Party	Candidate	Votes	%
Democratic	Walter "Doc" Blevins (incumbent)	18,211	60.1
Republican	Randy Memmer	12,113	39.9
Total votes		30,324	100.0
Democratic hold			

== District 29 ==
Incumbent senator Benny Ray Bailey won reelection, defeating Republican senator John David Preston, who had been redistricted from the 25th district.

=== Democratic primary ===
==== Candidates ====
===== Nominee =====
- Benny Ray Bailey, incumbent senator

=== Republican primary ===
==== Candidates ====
===== Nominee =====
- John David Preston, senator from the 25th district (1994–1997)

=== General election ===
==== Results ====
1996 Kentucky Senate 29th district election
Party	Candidate	Votes	%
Democratic	Benny Ray Bailey (incumbent)	18,878	61.2
Republican	John David Preston	11,978	38.8
Total votes		30,856	100.0
Democratic hold			

== District 31 ==
Incumbent Democratic senator Kelsey E. Friend Sr. was defeated for renomination by Gary C. Johnson.

=== Democratic primary ===
==== Candidates ====
===== Nominee =====
- Gary C. Johnson

===== Eliminated in primary =====
- Kelsey E. Friend Sr., incumbent senator

==== Results ====
Democratic primary results
Party	Candidate	Votes	%
Democratic	Gary C. Johnson	8,322	54.6
Democratic	Kelsey E. Friend, Sr. (incumbent)	6,923	45.4
Total votes		15,245	100.0

=== Republican primary ===
==== Candidates ====
===== Nominee =====
- Kevin Hall

=== General election ===
==== Results ====
1996 Kentucky Senate 31st district election
Party	Candidate	Votes	%
Democratic	Gary C. Johnson	18,167	64.1
Republican	Kevin Hall	10,154	35.9
Total votes		28,321	100.0
Democratic hold			

== District 33 ==
Incumbent senator Gerald A. Neal won reelection unopposed.

=== Democratic primary ===
==== Candidates ====
===== Nominee =====
- Gerald A. Neal, incumbent senator

=== General election ===
==== Results ====
1996 Kentucky Senate 33rd district election
Party	Candidate	Votes	%
Democratic	Gerald A. Neal (incumbent)	Unopposed	
Total votes		24,373	100.0
Democratic hold			

== District 35 ==
Incumbent senator David K. Karem won reelection, defeating Republican Bruce McCrea.

=== Democratic primary ===
==== Candidates ====
===== Nominee =====
- David K. Karem, incumbent senator

=== Republican primary ===
==== Candidates ====
===== Nominee =====
- Bruce McCrea

=== General election ===
==== Results ====
1996 Kentucky Senate 35th district election
Party	Candidate	Votes	%
Democratic	David K. Karem (incumbent)	30,381	65.4
Republican	Bruce McCrea	16,096	34.6
Total votes		46,477	100.0
Democratic hold			

== District 37 ==
Incumbent senator Larry Saunders won reelection, defeating Republican William C. Cothron.

=== Democratic primary ===
==== Candidates ====
===== Nominee =====
- Larry Saunders, incumbent senator

=== Republican primary ===
==== Candidates ====
===== Nominee =====
- William C. Cothron

=== General election ===
==== Results ====
1996 Kentucky Senate 37th district election
Party	Candidate	Votes	%
Democratic	Larry Saunders (incumbent)	22,348	67.0
Republican	William C. Cothron	11,006	33.0
Total votes		33,354	100.0
Democratic hold			

== See also ==
- 1996 Kentucky elections
  - 1996 Kentucky House of Representatives election
  - 1996 United States Senate election in Kentucky
  - 1996 United States House of Representatives elections in Kentucky
