= 2004 Kentucky Senate election =

- November 2, 2004

19 out of 38 seats in the Kentucky Senate 20 seats needed for a majority
	Majority party	Minority party
Leader	David Williams	Ed Worley
Party	Republican	Democratic
Leader since	January 5, 1999	January 6, 2003
Leader's seat	16th – Burkesville	34th – Richmond
Last election	21	16
Seats before	22	16
Seats won	22	15
Seat change	Steady	▼1
Seats up	9	10
Races won	9	9
- Results: Republican hold Republican gain Democratic hold Democratic gain Election voided No election Popular vote: 50–60% 80–90% >90% 50–60% 60–70% 70–80% >90%
Senate President before election
David Williams
Republican
Elected Senate President
David Williams
Republican

The 2004 Kentucky Senate election was held on November 2, 2004. The Republican and Democratic primary elections were held on May 18. Half of the senate (all odd-numbered seats) were up for election. Republicans maintained their majority in the chamber without gaining or losing any seats. A numbered map of the senate districts at the time can be viewed here.

Republicans had initially flipped district 37, but the results were voided when the candidate who won the election was determined to be ineligible to serve. Democrats retained that seat in a February 2006 special election.

== Overview ==
Party	Candidates		Votes	%	Seats			
Party	Opposed	Unopposed	Votes	%	Before	Won	After	+/−
Republican	12	4	369,602	50.31	22	9	22	-
Democratic	11	3	361,963	49.27	16	9	15	-1
Constitution	1	0	3,046	0.41	0	0	0	-
Total	24	7	734,611	100.00	38	18	37	-1
Source: Kentucky Secretary of State

== Retiring incumbents ==
A total of four senators retired, none of which ran for other offices.

=== Democratic ===
1. 1st: Bob Jackson (Murray): Retired.
2. 35th: David K. Karem (Louisville): Retired.
3. 37th: Larry Saunders (Louisville): Retired.

=== Republican ===
1. 7th: Lindy Casebier (Louisville): Retired due to redistricting.

== Incumbents defeated ==
Two incumbents lost renomination in the primary election.

=== In the primary election ===
==== Democrats ====
None.

==== Republicans ====
Two Republicans lost renomination.

1. 5th: Virgil Moore (first elected in 1992) lost renomination to Carroll Gibson, who won the general election.
2. 21st: Albert Robinson (first elected in 1994) lost renomination to Tom Jensen, who won the general election.

=== In the general election ===
None.

== Summary by district ==
Certified results by the Kentucky Secretary of State are available online for the primary election and general election.

† – Incumbent not seeking re-election

District	Incumbent	Party	Elected	Party
1	Bob Jackson†	Dem	Kenneth W. Winters	Rep
3	Joey Pendleton	Dem	Joey Pendleton	Dem
5	Virgil Moore	Rep	Carroll Gibson	Rep
7	Lindy Casebier†	Rep	Julian M. Carroll	Dem
9	Richard "Richie" Sanders	Rep	Richard "Richie" Sanders	Rep
11	Richard L. "Dick" Roeding	Rep	Richard L. "Dick" Roeding	Rep
13	Ernesto Scorsone	Dem	Ernesto Scorsone	Dem
15	Vernie McGaha	Rep	Vernie McGaha	Rep
17	Damon Thayer	Rep	Damon Thayer	Rep
19	Tim Shaughnessy	Dem	Tim Shaughnessy	Dem
21	Albert Robinson	Rep	Tom Jensen	Rep
23	Jack Westwood	Rep	Jack Westwood	Rep
25	Robert Stivers	Rep	Robert Stivers	Rep
27	Walter "Doc" Blevins	Dem	Walter "Doc" Blevins	Dem
29	Johnny Ray Turner	Dem	Johnny Ray Turner	Dem
31	Ray S. Jones II	Dem	Ray S. Jones II	Dem
33	Gerald A. Neal	Dem	Gerald A. Neal	Dem
35	David K. Karem†	Dem	Denise Harper Angel	Dem
37	Larry Saunders†	Dem	Vacant	

== Closest races ==
Seats where the margin of victory was under 10%:

1. District 37, 2.30% (election voided)
2. District 1, 2.37% (gain)
3. District 23, 6.60%
4. District 3, 7.80%

== Predictions ==
Source	Ranking	As of
Rothenberg	Likely R	October 1, 2004

== Special elections ==
=== District 17 special ===
The 17th district was vacant beginning January 1, 2003, following incumbent senator Daniel Mongiardo's election to the 30th district in November 2002. Damon Thayer was elected on January 28, 2003, for the remainder of the term.

2003 Kentucky Senate 17th district special election
Party	Candidate	Votes	%
Republican	Damon Thayer	4,913	55.6
Democratic	Charles Britton Wells	3,920	44.4
Total votes		8,833	100.0
Republican gain from Democratic			

=== District 4 special ===
Results by county: Ridley: 50–60%; 60–70%; Thomason: 50–60%

J. Dorsey Ridley was elected in July 2004 following the death of Paul Herron.

2004 Kentucky Senate 4th district special election
Party	Candidate	Votes	%
Democratic	J. Dorsey Ridley	12,094	59.1
Republican	David Thomason	8,362	40.9
Total votes		20,456	100.0
Democratic hold			

== District 1 ==
Incumbent senator Bob Jackson did not seek reelection. He was succeeded by Republican Kenneth W. Winters.

=== Democratic primary ===
==== Candidates ====
===== Nominee =====
- Dennis L. Null

=== Republican primary ===
==== Candidates ====
===== Nominee =====
- Kenneth W. Winters

=== General election ===
==== Results ====
Results by county: Winters: 50–60%; 60–70%; Null: 50–60%

2004 Kentucky Senate 1st district election
Party	Candidate	Votes	%
Republican	Kenneth W. Winters	23,701	51.2
Democratic	Dennis L. Null	22,603	48.8
Total votes		46,304	100.0
Republican gain from Democratic			

== District 3 ==
Incumbent senator Joey Pendleton won reelection, defeating Republican Tracy Dean Hann.

=== Democratic primary ===
==== Candidates ====
===== Nominee =====
- Joey Pendleton, incumbent senator

=== Republican primary ===
==== Candidates ====
===== Nominee =====
- Tracy Dean Hann

=== General election ===
==== Results ====
Results by county: Pendleton: 50–60%; Hann: 50–60%

2004 Kentucky Senate 3rd district election
Party	Candidate	Votes	%
Democratic	Joey Pendleton (incumbent)	18,189	53.9
Republican	Tracy Dean Hann	15,557	46.1
Total votes		33,746	100.0
Democratic hold			

== District 5 ==
Incumbent Republican senator Virgil Moore was defeated for renomination by Carroll Gibson.

=== Democratic primary ===
==== Candidates ====
===== Nominee =====
- Barry Cannon

===== Eliminated in primary =====
- Richard Thornton

==== Results ====
Democratic primary results
Party	Candidate	Votes	%
Democratic	Barry Cannon	3,641	68.1
Democratic	Richard Thornton	1,703	31.9
Total votes		5,344	100.0

=== Republican primary ===
==== Candidates ====
===== Nominee =====
- Carroll Gibson

===== Eliminated in primary =====
- Virgil Moore, incumbent senator

==== Results ====
Republican primary results
Party	Candidate	Votes	%
Republican	Carroll Gibson	2,842	63.4
Republican	Virgil Moore (incumbent)	1,641	36.6
Total votes		4,483	100.0

=== General election ===
==== Results ====
Results by county: Gibson: 50–60%; 60–70%; Cannon: 50–60%

2004 Kentucky Senate 5th district election
Party	Candidate	Votes	%
Republican	Carroll Gibson	23,717	55.2
Democratic	Barry Cannon	19,233	44.8
Total votes		42,950	100.0
Republican hold			

== District 7 ==
The 2002 redistricting of the senate moved the 7th district from Louisville to part of Lexington, Frankfort, and surrounding counties. Incumbent senator Lindy Casebier did not seek reelection and was succeeded by Democrat Julian M. Carroll.

=== Democratic primary ===
==== Candidates ====
===== Nominee =====
- Julian M. Carroll, governor of Kentucky (1974–1979)

===== Eliminated in primary =====
- Joe Graviss

==== Results ====
Democratic primary results
Party	Candidate	Votes	%
Democratic	Julian M. Carroll	10,149	56.0
Democratic	Joe Graviss	7,973	44.0
Total votes		18,122	100.0

=== Republican primary ===
==== Candidates ====
===== Nominee =====
- Harold Fletcher Jr.

=== General election ===
==== Results ====
2004 Kentucky Senate 7th district election
Party	Candidate	Votes	%
Democratic	Julian M. Carroll	33,509	63.0
Republican	Harold Fletcher Jr.	19,708	37.0
Total votes		53,217	100.0
Democratic gain from Republican			

== District 9 ==
Incumbent senator Richard "Richie" Sanders won reelection unopposed.

=== Republican primary ===
==== Candidates ====
===== Nominee =====
- Richard "Richie" Sanders, incumbent senator

=== General election ===
==== Results ====
2004 Kentucky Senate 9th district election
Party	Candidate	Votes	%
Republican	Richard "Richie" Sanders (incumbent)	Unopposed	
Total votes		29,661	100.0
Republican hold			

== District 11 ==
Incumbent senator Richard L. "Dick" Roeding won reelection, defeating primary election challenger Charlie Walton.

=== Republican primary ===
==== Candidates ====
===== Nominee =====
- Richard L. "Dick" Roeding, incumbent senator

===== Eliminated in primary =====
- Charlie Walton, representative from the 66th district (1993–2005)

==== Results ====
Republican primary results
Party	Candidate	Votes	%
Republican	Richard L. "Dick" Roeding (incumbent)	4,020	57.2
Republican	Charlie Walton	3,013	42.8
Total votes		7,033	100.0

=== General election ===
==== Results ====
2004 Kentucky Senate 11th district election
Party	Candidate	Votes	%
Republican	Richard L. "Dick" Roeding (incumbent)	Unopposed	
Total votes		39,618	100.0
Republican hold			

== District 13 ==
Incumbent senator Ernesto Scorsone won reelection unopposed.

=== Democratic primary ===
==== Candidates ====
===== Nominee =====
- Ernesto Scorsone, incumbent senator

=== General election ===
==== Results ====
2004 Kentucky Senate 13th district election
Party	Candidate	Votes	%
Democratic	Ernesto Scorsone (incumbent)	Unopposed	
Total votes		29,055	100.0
Democratic hold			

== District 15 ==
Incumbent senator Vernie McGaha won reelection, defeating primary election challenger David Carr.

=== Republican primary ===
==== Candidates ====
===== Nominee =====
- Vernie McGaha, incumbent senator

===== Eliminated in primary =====
- David Carr

==== Results ====
Republican primary results
Party	Candidate	Votes	%
Republican	Vernie McGaha (incumbent)	6,692	71.5
Republican	David Carr	2,673	28.5
Total votes		9,365	100.0

=== General election ===
==== Results ====
2004 Kentucky Senate 15th district election
Party	Candidate	Votes	%
Republican	Vernie McGaha (incumbent)	Unopposed	
Total votes		34,131	100.0
Republican hold			

== District 17 ==
Incumbent senator Damon Thayer won reelection, defeating Democrat Cliff Wallace.

=== Democratic primary ===
==== Candidates ====
===== Nominee =====
- Cliff Wallace

=== Republican primary ===
==== Candidates ====
===== Nominee =====
- Damon Thayer, incumbent senator

=== General election ===
==== Results ====
2004 Kentucky Senate 17th district election
Party	Candidate	Votes	%
Republican	Damon Thayer (incumbent)	25,951	55.5
Democratic	Cliff Wallace	20,826	44.5
Total votes		46,777	100.0
Republican hold			

== District 19 ==
Incumbent senator Tim Shaughnessy won reelection, defeating primary and general election challengers.

=== Democratic primary ===
==== Candidates ====
===== Nominee =====
- Tim Shaughnessy, incumbent senator

===== Eliminated in primary =====
- Ched Jennings

==== Results ====
Democratic primary results
Party	Candidate	Votes	%
Democratic	Tim Shaughnessy (incumbent)	9,597	79.7
Democratic	Ched Jennings	2,441	20.3
Total votes		12,038	100.0

=== Republican primary ===
==== Candidates ====
===== Nominee =====
- Christopher M. Smrt

=== General election ===
==== Results ====
2004 Kentucky Senate 19th district election
Party	Candidate	Votes	%
Democratic	Tim Shaughnessy (incumbent)	36,749	61.5
Republican	Christopher M. Smrt	22,964	38.5
Total votes		59,713	100.0
Democratic hold			

== District 21 ==
Incumbent Republican senator Albert Robinson was defeated for renomination by Tom Jensen.

=== Republican primary ===
==== Candidates ====
===== Nominee =====
- Tom Jensen, representative from the 85th district (1985–1987, 1989–1997)

===== Eliminated in primary =====
- Albert Robinson, incumbent senator

==== Results ====
Republican primary results
Party	Candidate	Votes	%
Republican	Tom Jensen	5,066	56.7
Republican	Albert Robinson (incumbent)	3,870	43.3
Total votes		8,936	100.0

=== General election ===
==== Results ====
2004 Kentucky Senate 21st district election
Party	Candidate	Votes	%
Republican	Tom Jensen	Unopposed	
Total votes		27,386	100.0
Republican hold			

== District 23 ==
Incumbent senator Jack Westwood won reelection, defeating Democrat Kathryn Groob.

=== Democratic primary ===
==== Candidates ====
===== Nominee =====
- Kathryn Groob

=== Republican primary ===
==== Candidates ====
===== Nominee =====
- Jack Westwood, incumbent senator

=== General election ===
==== Results ====
2004 Kentucky Senate 23rd district election
Party	Candidate	Votes	%
Republican	Jack Westwood (incumbent)	21,864	53.3
Democratic	Kathryn Groob	19,158	46.7
Total votes		41,022	100.0
Republican hold			

== District 25 ==
Incumbent senator Robert Stivers won reelection, defeating Constitution Party candidate Jeffrey L. Hillebrandt.

=== Republican primary ===
==== Candidates ====
===== Nominee =====
- Robert Stivers, incumbent senator

=== Third-party candidates ===
==== Constitution ====
- Jeffrey L. Hillebrandt

=== General election ===
==== Results ====
2004 Kentucky Senate 25th district election
Party	Candidate	Votes	%
Republican	Robert Stivers (incumbent)	20,928	87.3
Constitution	Jeffrey L. Hillebrandt	3,046	12.7
Total votes		23,974	100.0
Republican hold			

== District 27 ==
Incumbent senator Walter "Doc" Blevins won reelection, defeating Republican Tim York.

=== Democratic primary ===
==== Candidates ====
===== Nominee =====
- Walter "Doc" Blevins, incumbent senator

=== Republican primary ===
==== Candidates ====
===== Nominee =====
- Tim York

=== General election ===
==== Results ====
Results by county: Blevins: 50–60%; 60–70%; 80–90%; York: 50–60%

2004 Kentucky Senate 27th district election
Party	Candidate	Votes	%
Democratic	Walter "Doc" Blevins (incumbent)	25,339	58.4
Republican	Tim York	18,043	41.6
Total votes		43,382	100.0
Democratic hold			

== District 29 ==
Incumbent senator Johnny Ray Turner won reelection, defeating primary election challenger Eric Shane Hamilton.

=== Democratic primary ===
==== Candidates ====
===== Nominee =====
- Johnny Ray Turner, incumbent senator

===== Eliminated in primary =====
- Eric Shane Hamilton

==== Results ====
Democratic primary results
Party	Candidate	Votes	%
Democratic	Johnny Ray Turner (incumbent)	7,951	50.1
Democratic	Eric Shane Hamilton	7,927	49.9
Total votes		15,878	100.0

=== General election ===
==== Results ====
2004 Kentucky Senate 29th district election
Party	Candidate	Votes	%
Democratic	Johnny Ray Turner (incumbent)	Unopposed	
Total votes		28,625	100.0
Democratic hold			

== District 31 ==
Incumbent senator Ray S. Jones II won reelection, defeating Republican candidate Chris Ratliff.

=== Democratic primary ===
==== Candidates ====
===== Nominee =====
- Ray S. Jones II, incumbent senator

=== Republican primary ===
==== Candidates ====
===== Nominee =====
- Chris Ratliff, representative from the 93rd district (1997–2001)

=== General election ===
==== Results ====
Results by county: Jones: 50–60%; 60–70%; Ratliff: 50–60%

2004 Kentucky Senate 31st district election
Party	Candidate	Votes	%
Democratic	Ray S. Jones II (incumbent)	23,952	61.2
Republican	Chris Ratliff	15,187	38.8
Total votes		39,139	100.0
Democratic hold			

== District 33 ==
Incumbent senator Gerald A. Neal won reelection unopposed.

=== Democratic primary ===
==== Candidates ====
===== Nominee =====
- Gerald A. Neal, incumbent senator

=== General election ===
==== Results ====
2004 Kentucky Senate 33rd district election
Party	Candidate	Votes	%
Democratic	Gerald A. Neal (incumbent)	Unopposed	
Total votes		33,552	100.0
Democratic hold			

== District 35 ==
Incumbent senator David K. Karem did not seek reelection. He was succeeded by Democrat Denise Harper Angel.

=== Democratic primary ===
==== Candidates ====
===== Nominee =====
- Denise Harper Angel

===== Eliminated in primary =====
- Ken Herndon
- David Kaplan
- Shelby Lanier Jr.

==== Results ====
Democratic primary results
Party	Candidate	Votes	%
Democratic	Denise Harper Angel	2,830	34.8
Democratic	Ken Herndon	1,948	23.9
Democratic	Shelby Lanier Jr.	1,682	20.7
Democratic	David Kaplan	1,675	20.6
Total votes		8,135	100.0

=== Republican primary ===
==== Candidates ====
===== Nominee =====
- Ron Burrell

=== General election ===
==== Results ====
2004 Kentucky Senate 35th district election
Party	Candidate	Votes	%
Democratic	Denise Harper Angel	29,423	77.8
Republican	Ron Burrell	8,414	22.2
Total votes		37,837	100.0
Democratic hold			

== District 37 ==
Incumbent senator Larry Saunders did not seek reelection. The winner of the general election, Republican candidate Dana Seum Stephenson, was later declared to be ineligible due to her failure to meet residency requirements outlined in the state constitution. The seat remained vacant for over a year before a special election was held in February 2006, won by Democrat Perry B. Clark.

=== Democratic primary ===
==== Candidates ====
===== Nominee =====
- Virginia L. Woodward

=== Republican primary ===
==== Candidates ====
===== Nominee =====
- Dana Seum Stephenson

=== General election ===
==== Results ====
2004 Kentucky Senate 37th district election
Party	Candidate	Votes	%
Republican	Dana Seum Stephenson	22,772	51.1
Democratic	Virginia L. Woodward	21,750	48.9
Total votes		44,522	100.0

== See also ==
- 2004 Kentucky elections
  - 2004 Kentucky House of Representatives election
  - 2004 United States Senate election in Kentucky
  - 2004 United States House of Representatives elections in Kentucky
