= 2012 Kentucky Senate election =

- November 6, 2012

19 out of 38 seats in the Kentucky Senate 20 seats needed for a majority
	Majority party	Minority party
Leader	None	R. J. Palmer
Party	Republican	Democratic
Leader since	—	January 4, 2011
Leader's seat	—	28th – Winchester
Last election	22 (Note: Independent senator Bob Leeper caucused with the Republicans.)	15
Seats won	23	14
Seat change	▲1	▼1
Seats up	9	10
Races won	10	9
- Results: Republican hold Republican gain Democratic hold
Senate President before election
David L. Williams
Republican
Elected Senate President
Robert Stivers
Republican

The 2012 Kentucky Senate election was held on November 6, 2012. The Republican and Democratic primary elections were held on May 22. Half of the senate (all odd-numbered seats) was up for election. Prior to the election 22 seats were held by Republicans and 15 were held by Democrats, while one was held by Independent senator Bob Leeper, who caucused with the Republicans. Republicans maintained their majority in the chamber, gaining one seat.

== Predictions ==
Source	Ranking	As of
Governing	Safe R	October 24, 2012

== Retirements ==
1. 1st District: Kenneth W. Winters (R) retired.
2. 15th District: Vernie McGaha (R) retired.
3. 23rd District: Jack Westwood (R) retired.

== Incumbents defeated ==
1. 3rd District: Joey Pendleton (D) lost re-election to Whitney Westerfield.

== Closest races ==
Seats where the margin of victory was under 10%:

1. District 3, 0.82% (gain)
2. District 21, 7.64%

== Special elections ==
=== District 19 special ===
§ Special election

=== District 16 special ===
Results by county: Gregory: 60–70%; 80–90%

Sara Beth Gregory was elected in December 2012 following the resignation of David L. Williams.

2012 Kentucky Senate 16th district special election
Party	Candidate	Votes	%
Republican	Sara Beth Gregory	6,244	81.3
Democratic	Bill Conn	1,440	18.7
Total votes		7,684	100.0
Republican hold			

== District 1 ==
2012 Kentucky Senate 1st district election
Party	Candidate	Votes	%
Republican	Stanley H. Humphries	28,338	59.31
Democratic	Carroll Hubbard	19,445	40.69
Total votes		47,783	100.0
Republican hold			

== District 3 ==
2012 Kentucky Senate 3rd district election
Party	Candidate	Votes	%
Republican	Whitney Westerfield	18,457	50.41
Democratic	Joey Pendleton (incumbent)	18,160	49.59
Total votes		36,617	100.0
Republican gain from Democratic			

== District 5 ==
2012 Kentucky Senate 5th district election
Party	Candidate	Votes	%
Republican	Carroll Gibson (incumbent)	32,028	100.0
Total votes		32,028	100.0
Republican hold			

== District 7 ==
2012 Kentucky Senate 7th district election
Party	Candidate	Votes	%
Democratic	Julian Carroll (incumbent)	33,404	59.00
Republican	Frank Haynes	23,213	41.00
Total votes		56,617	100.0
Democratic hold			

== District 9 ==
2012 Kentucky Senate 9th district election
Party	Candidate	Votes	%
Republican	David P. Givens (incumbent)	33,874	100.0
Total votes		33,874	100.0
Republican hold			

== District 11 ==
2012 Kentucky Senate 11th district election
Party	Candidate	Votes	%
Republican	John Schickel (incumbent)	46,962	100.0
Total votes		46,962	100.0
Republican hold			

== District 13 ==
2012 Kentucky Senate 13th district election
Party	Candidate	Votes	%
Democratic	Kathy Stein (incumbent)	30,365	100.0
Total votes		30,365	100.0
Democratic hold			

== District 15 ==
2012 Kentucky Senate 15th district election
Party	Candidate	Votes	%
Republican	Chris Girdler	36,946	100.0
Total votes		36,946	100.0
Republican hold			

== District 17 ==
2012 Kentucky Senate 17th district election
Party	Candidate	Votes	%
Republican	Damon Thayer (incumbent)	35,343	66.35
Democratic	David Holcomb	17,926	33.65
Total votes		53,269	100.0
Republican hold			

== District 19 ==
=== General election ===
==== Results ====
2012 Kentucky Senate 19th district election
Party	Candidate	Votes	%
Democratic	Morgan McGarvey (incumbent)	39,327	100.0
Total votes		39,327	100.0
Democratic hold			

=== Special election ===
==== Results ====
2012 Kentucky Senate 19th district special election
Party	Candidate	Votes	%
Democratic	Morgan McGarvey	38,301	100.0
Total votes		38,301	100.0
Democratic hold			

== District 21 ==
2012 Kentucky Senate 21st district election
Party	Candidate	Votes	%
Republican	Albert Robinson	20,490	53.82
Democratic	Amie Hacker	17,583	46.18
Total votes		38,073	100.0
Republican hold			

== District 23 ==
2012 Kentucky Senate 23rd district election
Party	Candidate	Votes	%
Republican	Christian McDaniel	23,993	59.98
Democratic	James Noll	16,010	40.02
Total votes		40,003	100.0
Republican hold			

== District 25 ==
2012 Kentucky Senate 25th district election
Party	Candidate	Votes	%
Republican	Robert Stivers (incumbent)	21,198	63.95
Democratic	Ralph Hoskins	11,949	36.05
Total votes		33,147	100.0
Republican hold			

== District 27 ==
2012 Kentucky Senate 27th district election
Party	Candidate	Votes	%
Democratic	Walter Blevins (incumbent)	24,977	63.51
Republican	Tony Downey	14,350	36.49
Total votes		39,327	100.0
Democratic hold			

== District 29 ==
2012 Kentucky Senate 29th district election
Party	Candidate	Votes	%
Democratic	Johnny Ray Turner (incumbent)	24,644	100.0
Total votes		24,644	100.0
Democratic hold			

== District 31 ==
2012 Kentucky Senate 31st district election
Party	Candidate	Votes	%
Democratic	Ray Jones II (incumbent)	25,303	100.0
Total votes		25,303	100.0
Democratic hold			

== District 33 ==
2012 Kentucky Senate 33rd district election
Party	Candidate	Votes	%
Democratic	Gerald Neal (incumbent)	33,986	93.68
Independent	Norris Shelton	2,291	6.32
Total votes		36,277	100.0
Democratic hold			

== District 35 ==
2012 Kentucky Senate 35th district election
Party	Candidate	Votes	%
Democratic	Denise Harper Angel (incumbent)	32,126	100.0
Total votes		32,126	100.0
Democratic hold			

== District 37 ==
2012 Kentucky Senate 37th district election
Party	Candidate	Votes	%
Democratic	Perry B. Clark (incumbent)	24,806	58.58
Republican	Chris Thieneman	17,536	41.42
Total votes		42,342	100.0
Democratic hold			
