= 2008 Kentucky Senate election =

- November 4, 2008

19 out of 38 seats in the Kentucky Senate 20 seats needed for a majority
	Majority party	Minority party
Leader	David L. Williams	Ed Worley
Party	Republican	Democratic
Leader since	January 5, 1999	January 6, 2003
Leader's seat	16th – Burkesville	34th – Richmond
Last election	21	16
Seats before	22 (Note: Republican Brandon Smith was elected in February 2008 to fill the vacant seat of Democrat Daniel Mongiardo.) (Note: Independent senator Bob Leeper caucused with the Republicans.)	15
Seats won	22	15
Seat change	Steady	Steady
Seats up	9	10
Races won	9	10
- Results: Republican hold Democratic hold
Senate President before election
David L. Williams
Republican
Elected Senate President
David L. Williams
Republican

The 2008 Kentucky Senate election was held on November 4, 2008. The Republican and Democratic primary elections were held on May 20. Half of the senate (all odd-numbered seats) was up for election. Prior to the election 22 seats were held by Republicans and 15 were held by Democrats, while one was held by Independent senator Bob Leeper, who caucused with the Republicans. Republicans maintained their majority in the chamber, without gaining or losing any seats.

== Predictions ==
Source	Ranking	As of
Governing	Likely R	October 15, 2008

== Retirements ==
1. 9th District: Richie Sanders (R) retired.
2. 11th District: Dick Roeding (R) retired.

== Closest races ==
Seats where the margin of victory was under 10%:

1. District 23, 1.96%
2. District 1, 7.70%

== Special elections ==
=== District 30 special ===
Results by county: Smith: 50–60%; 60–70%; Alexander: 50–60%

2008 Kentucky Senate 30th district special election
Party	Candidate	Votes	%
Republican	Brandon Smith	10,409	51.0
Democratic	Scott Alexander	10,008	49.0
Total votes		20,417	100.0
Republican gain from Democratic			

== District 1 ==
2008 Kentucky Senate 1st district election
Party	Candidate	Votes	%
Republican	Kenneth W. Winters (incumbent)	26,430	53.85
Democratic	Carroll Hubbard	22,650	46.15
Total votes		49,080	100.0
Republican hold			

== District 3 ==
2008 Kentucky Senate 3rd district election
Party	Candidate	Votes	%
Democratic	Joey Pendleton (incumbent)	21,410	56.51
Republican	Tom Jones	16,479	43.49
Total votes		37,889	100.0
Democratic hold			

== District 5 ==
2008 Kentucky Senate 5th district election
Party	Candidate	Votes	%
Republican	Carroll Gibson (incumbent)	31,634	100.0
Total votes		31,634	100.0
Republican hold			

== District 7 ==
2008 Kentucky Senate 7th district election
Party	Candidate	Votes	%
Democratic	Julian Carroll (incumbent)	44,692	100.0
Total votes		44,692	100.0
Democratic hold			

== District 9 ==
2008 Kentucky Senate 9th district election
Party	Candidate	Votes	%
Republican	David P. Givens	24,775	55.37
Democratic	Steve Newberry	19,967	44.63
Total votes		44,742	100.0
Republican hold			

== District 11 ==
2008 Kentucky Senate 11th district election
Party	Candidate	Votes	%
Republican	John Schickel	45,047	100.0
Total votes		45,047	100.0
Republican hold			

== District 13 ==
2008 Kentucky Senate 13th district election
Party	Candidate	Votes	%
Democratic	Kathy Stein	26,593	65.81
Republican	Chuck Ellinger II	13,815	34.19
Total votes		40,408	100.0
Democratic hold			

== District 15 ==
2008 Kentucky Senate 15th district election
Party	Candidate	Votes	%
Republican	Vernie McGaha (incumbent)	36,212	100.0
Total votes		36,212	100.0
Republican hold			

== District 17 ==
2008 Kentucky Senate 17th district election
Party	Candidate	Votes	%
Republican	Damon Thayer (incumbent)	31,835	61.63
Democratic	Robert Powell	18,342	35.51
Constitution	Micah L. Ingram	1,478	2.86
Total votes		51,655	100.0
Republican hold			

== District 19 ==
2008 Kentucky Senate 19th district election
Party	Candidate	Votes	%
Democratic	Tim Shaughnessy (incumbent)	36,199	59.52
Republican	Bob Heleringer	24,615	40.48
Total votes		60,814	100.0
Democratic hold			

== District 21 ==
2008 Kentucky Senate 21st district election
Party	Candidate	Votes	%
Republican	Tom Jensen (incumbent)	29,471	100.0
Total votes		29,471	100.0
Republican hold			

== District 23 ==
2008 Kentucky Senate 23rd district election
Party	Candidate	Votes	%
Republican	Jack Westwood (incumbent)	21,057	50.98
Democratic	Kathy Groob	20,250	49.02
Total votes		41,307	100.0
Republican hold			

== District 25 ==
2008 Kentucky Senate 25th district election
Party	Candidate	Votes	%
Republican	Robert Stivers (incumbent)	21,459	65.21
Democratic	Michael Adkins	11,450	34.79
Total votes		32,909	100.0
Republican hold			

== District 27 ==
2008 Kentucky Senate 27th district election
Party	Candidate	Votes	%
Democratic	Walter Blevins (incumbent)	27,202	64.89
Republican	Richard White	14,717	35.11
Total votes		41,919	100.0
Democratic hold			

== District 29 ==
2008 Kentucky Senate 29th district election
Party	Candidate	Votes	%
Democratic	Johnny Ray Turner (incumbent)	26,389	100.0
Total votes		26,389	100.0
Democratic hold			

== District 31 ==
2008 Kentucky Senate 31st district election
Party	Candidate	Votes	%
Democratic	Ray Jones II (incumbent)	24,814	100.0
Total votes		24,814	100.0
Democratic hold			

== District 33 ==
2008 Kentucky Senate 33rd district election
Party	Candidate	Votes	%
Democratic	Gerald Neal (incumbent)	36,700	100.0
Total votes		36,700	100.0
Democratic hold			

== District 35 ==
2008 Kentucky Senate 35th district election
Party	Candidate	Votes	%
Democratic	Denise Harper Angel (incumbent)	32,022	83.68
Republican	John Albers	6,246	16.32
Total votes		38,268	100.0
Democratic hold			

== District 37 ==
2008 Kentucky Senate 37th district election
Party	Candidate	Votes	%
Democratic	Perry B. Clark (incumbent)	25,739	56.58
Republican	Doug Hawkins	19,749	43.42
Total votes		45,488	100.0
Democratic hold			
