= Kentucky's 5th Senate district =

American legislative district

Kentucky's 5th State Senate district
Senator
Stephen Meredith; R–Leitchfield
since January 1, 2017
- Registration: 61.5% Republican; 29.8% Democratic; 8.1% No party preference
- Demographics: 92.1% White; 1.7% Black; 3.2% Hispanic; 0.3% Asian; 0.1% Native American; 0.1% Hawaiian/Pacific Islander; 0.2% Other; 2.4% Multiracial
- Population (2023): 113,417
- Registered voters (2025): 85,813

Kentucky's 5th Senatorial district is one of 38 districts in the Kentucky Senate. Located in the western part of the state, it comprises the counties of Breckinridge, Butler, Grayson, Meade, and Ohio. It has been represented by Stephen Meredith (R–Leitchfield) since 2017. As of 2023, the district had a population of 113,417.

== Voter registration ==
On January 1, 2025, the district had 85,813 registered voters, who were registered with the following parties.

Party	Registration	
Party	Voters	%
Republican	52,806	61.54
Democratic	25,567	29.79
Independent	3,177	3.70
Libertarian	356	0.41
Green	49	0.06
Constitution	48	0.06
Socialist Workers	12	0.01
Reform	6	0.01
"Other"	3,792	4.42
Total	85,813	100.00
Source: Kentucky State Board of Elections

== Election results from statewide races ==
=== 2014 – 2020 ===
Year	Office	Results (Note: Figures presented in this table are calculated by summing precinct election results published by the Kentucky State Board of Elections, using precinct data that list each precinct's senatorial district.)
2014	Senator	McConnell 59.6 - 36.9%
2015	Governor	Bevin 57.7 - 38.4%
2015	Secretary of State	Knipper 53.3 - 46.7%
2015	Attorney General	Westerfield 54.0 - 46.0%
2015	Auditor of Public Accounts	Harmon 54.4 - 45.6%
2015	State Treasurer	Ball 64.7 - 35.3%
2015	Commissioner of Agriculture	Quarles 63.2 - 36.8%
2016	President	Trump 74.6 - 21.7%
2016	Senator	Paul 63.7 - 36.3%
2019	Governor	Bevin 59.1 - 38.5%
2019	Secretary of State	Adams 61.3 - 38.7%
2019	Attorney General	Cameron 69.3 - 30.7%
2019	Auditor of Public Accounts	Harmon 65.9 - 31.1%
2019	State Treasurer	Ball 71.7 - 28.3%
2019	Commissioner of Agriculture	Quarles 69.5 - 27.7%
2020	President	Trump 76.1 - 22.4%
2020	Senator	McConnell 68.9 - 25.7%
2020	Amendment 1	Yes 59.1 - 40.9%
2020	Amendment 2	No 67.0 - 33.0%

=== 2022 – present ===
Year	Office	Results
2022	Senator	Paul 76.2 - 23.8%
2022	Amendment 1	Yes 54.4 - 45.6%
2022	Amendment 2	Yes 58.7 - 41.3%
2023	Governor	Cameron 60.7 - 39.3%
2023	Secretary of State	Adams 73.5 - 26.5%
2023	Attorney General	Coleman 72.9 - 27.1%
2023	Auditor of Public Accounts	Ball 74.4 - 25.6%
2023	State Treasurer	Metcalf 71.5 - 28.5%
2023	Commissioner of Agriculture	Shell 74.3 - 25.7%
2024	President	Trump 78.7 - 20.0%
2024	Amendment 1	Yes 67.3 - 32.7%
2024	Amendment 2	No 63.1 - 36.9%

== List of members representing the district ==
Member	Party	Years	Electoral history	District location
Thomas M. Brizendine (Franklin)	Democratic	January 1, 1964 – January 1, 1968	Elected in 1963. Retired.	1964–1972
Carl T. Hadden (Elkton)	Democratic	January 1, 1968 – January 1, 1972	Elected in 1967. Retired.	1964–1972
Damon Majors (Caneyville)	Democratic	January 1, 1972 – September 1973	Elected in 1971. Resigned due to ill health.	1972–1974
Earl R. Glenn (Leitchfield)	Democratic	November 1973 – January 1, 1976	Elected to finish Majors's term. Lost renomination.	1974–1984
Joe Wright (Harned)	Democratic	January 1, 1976 – January 1, 1993	Elected in 1975. Reelected in 1979. Reelected in 1983. Reelected in 1988. Retired.	1974–1984
Joe Wright (Harned)	Democratic	January 1, 1976 – January 1, 1993	Elected in 1975. Reelected in 1979. Reelected in 1983. Reelected in 1988. Retired.	1984–1993; Breckinridge, Grayson, Hardin (part), Hart, Meade, and Ohio (part) Counties.
Virgil Moore (Leitchfield)	Republican	January 1, 1993 – January 1, 2005	Elected in 1992. Reelected in 1996. Reelected in 2000. Lost renomination.	1993–1997
Virgil Moore (Leitchfield)	Republican	January 1, 1993 – January 1, 2005	Elected in 1992. Reelected in 1996. Reelected in 2000. Lost renomination.	1997–2003
Virgil Moore (Leitchfield)	Republican	January 1, 1993 – January 1, 2005	Elected in 1992. Reelected in 1996. Reelected in 2000. Lost renomination.	2003–2015
Carroll Gibson (Leitchfield)	Republican	January 1, 2005 – January 1, 2017	Elected in 2004. Reelected in 2008. Reelected in 2012. Retired.	2003–2015
Carroll Gibson (Leitchfield)	Republican	January 1, 2005 – January 1, 2017	Elected in 2004. Reelected in 2008. Reelected in 2012. Retired.	2015–2023
Stephen Meredith (Leitchfield)	Republican	January 1, 2017 – present	Elected in 2016. Reelected in 2020. Reelected in 2024.	2015–2023
Stephen Meredith (Leitchfield)	Republican	January 1, 2017 – present	Elected in 2016. Reelected in 2020. Reelected in 2024.	2023–present
