= Kentucky's 15th Senate district =

American legislative district

Kentucky's 15th State Senate district
Senator
Rick Girdler; R–Somerset
since January 1, 2017
- Registration: 73.7% Republican; 18.4% Democratic; 7.5% No party preference
- Demographics: 92.6% White; 0.9% Black; 3.4% Hispanic; 0.5% Asian; 0.2% Native American; 0.1% Other; 2.3% Multiracial
- Population (2023): 118,400
- Registered voters (2025): 94,615

Kentucky's 15th Senatorial district is one of 38 districts in the Kentucky Senate. Located in the southern part of the state, it comprises the counties of Clinton, Cumberland, Pulaski, Russell, and Wayne. It has been represented by Rick Girdler (R–Somerset) since 2017. As of 2023, the district had a population of 118,400.

== Voter registration ==
On January 1, 2025, the district had 94,615 registered voters, who were registered with the following parties.

Party	Registration	
Party	Voters	%
Republican	69,698	73.66
Democratic	17,433	18.43
Independent	3,581	3.78
Libertarian	319	0.34
Constitution	49	0.05
Green	41	0.04
Socialist Workers	17	0.02
Reform	6	0.01
"Other"	3,471	3.67
Total	94,615	100.00
Source: Kentucky State Board of Elections

== Election results from statewide races ==
=== 2014 – 2020 ===
Year	Office	Results (Note: Figures presented in this table are calculated by summing precinct election results published by the Kentucky State Board of Elections, using precinct data that list each precinct's senatorial district.)
2014	Senator	McConnell 66.3 - 30.4%
2015	Governor	Bevin 65.9 - 30.4%
2015	Secretary of State	Knipper 57.7 - 42.3%
2015	Attorney General	Westerfield 63.7 - 36.3%
2015	Auditor of Public Accounts	Harmon 65.2 - 34.8%
2015	State Treasurer	Ball 74.5 - 25.5%
2015	Commissioner of Agriculture	Quarles 73.2 - 26.8%
2016	President	Trump 75.7 - 20.5%
2016	Senator	Paul 66.3 - 33.7%
2019	Governor	Bevin 62.9 - 35.1%
2019	Secretary of State	Adams 68.0 - 32.0%
2019	Attorney General	Cameron 71.9 - 28.1%
2019	Auditor of Public Accounts	Harmon 74.5 - 23.3%
2019	State Treasurer	Ball 75.8 - 24.2%
2019	Commissioner of Agriculture	Quarles 73.9 - 23.7%
2020	President	Trump 75.2 - 23.2%
2020	Senator	McConnell 70.6 - 24.8%
2020	Amendment 1	Yes 59.6 - 40.4%
2020	Amendment 2	No 67.6 - 32.4%

=== 2022 – present ===
Year	Office	Results
2022	Senator	Paul 81.8 - 18.2%
2022	Amendment 1	Yes 60.3 - 39.7%
2022	Amendment 2	Yes 69.5 - 30.5%
2023	Governor	Cameron 68.3 - 31.7%
2023	Secretary of State	Adams 81.8 - 18.2%
2023	Attorney General	Coleman 80.0 - 20.0%
2023	Auditor of Public Accounts	Ball 82.5 - 17.5%
2023	State Treasurer	Metcalf 79.6 - 20.4%
2023	Commissioner of Agriculture	Shell 81.7 - 18.3%
2024	President	Trump 83.3 - 15.6%
2024	Amendment 1	Yes 69.2 - 30.8%
2024	Amendment 2	No 63.3 - 36.7%

== List of members representing the district ==
Member	Party	Years	Electoral history	District location
Norman E. Farris (Somerset)	Republican	January 1, 1968 – January 1, 1976	Elected in 1967. Reelected in 1971. Retired.	1964–1972
Norman E. Farris (Somerset)	Republican	January 1, 1968 – January 1, 1976	Elected in 1967. Reelected in 1971. Retired.	1972–1974
Norman E. Farris (Somerset)	Republican	January 1, 1968 – January 1, 1976	Elected in 1967. Reelected in 1971. Retired.	1974–1984
John D. Rogers (Somerset)	Republican	January 1, 1976 – November 10, 1994	Elected in 1975. Reelected in 1979. Reelected in 1983. Reelected in 1988. Reelected in 1992. Resigned after being convicted of selling his influence.	1974–1984
John D. Rogers (Somerset)	Republican	January 1, 1976 – November 10, 1994	Elected in 1975. Reelected in 1979. Reelected in 1983. Reelected in 1988. Reelected in 1992. Resigned after being convicted of selling his influence.	1984–1993; Garrard, Jackson (part), Lincoln, Pulaski, and Rockcastle Counties.
John D. Rogers (Somerset)	Republican	January 1, 1976 – November 10, 1994	Elected in 1975. Reelected in 1979. Reelected in 1983. Reelected in 1988. Reelected in 1992. Resigned after being convicted of selling his influence.	1993–1997
James Crase (Somerset)	Republican	December 1994 – January 1, 1997	Elected to finish Rogers's term. Retired.	1993–1997
Vernie McGaha (Russell Springs)	Republican	January 1, 1997 – January 1, 2013	Elected in 1996. Reelected in 2000. Reelected in 2004. Reelected in 2008. Retired.	1997–2003
Vernie McGaha (Russell Springs)	Republican	January 1, 1997 – January 1, 2013	Elected in 1996. Reelected in 2000. Reelected in 2004. Reelected in 2008. Retired.	2003–2015
Chris Girdler (Somerset)	Republican	January 1, 2013 – January 1, 2017	Elected in 2012. Retired.	2003–2015
Chris Girdler (Somerset)	Republican	January 1, 2013 – January 1, 2017	Elected in 2012. Retired.	2015–2023
Rick Girdler (Somerset)	Republican	January 1, 2017 – present	Elected in 2016. Reelected in 2020. Reelected in 2024.	2015–2023
Rick Girdler (Somerset)	Republican	January 1, 2017 – present	Elected in 2016. Reelected in 2020. Reelected in 2024.	2023–present
