= Kentucky's 9th Senate district =

American legislative district

Kentucky's 9th State Senate district
Senator
David P. Givens; R–Greensburg
since January 1, 2009
- Registration: 52.6% Republican; 37.9% Democratic; 8.8% No party preference
- Demographics: 82.7% White; 6.0% Black; 5.7% Hispanic; 1.5% Asian; 0.1% Native American; 0.1% Hawaiian/Pacific Islander; 0.3% Other; 3.7% Multiracial
- Population (2023): 124,178
- Registered voters (2025): 87,050

Kentucky's 9th Senatorial district is one of 38 districts in the Kentucky Senate. Located in the southern part of the state, it comprises the counties of Barren, Edmonson, Green, Hart, and part of Warren. It has been represented by David P. Givens (R–Greensburg) since 2009. As of 2023, the district had a population of 124,178.

== Voter registration ==
On January 1, 2025, the district had 87,050 registered voters, who were registered with the following parties.

Party	Registration	
Party	Voters	%
Republican	45,781	52.59
Democratic	33,035	37.95
Independent	3,816	4.38
Libertarian	398	0.46
Green	64	0.07
Constitution	38	0.04
Socialist Workers	20	0.02
Reform	11	0.01
"Other"	3,887	4.47
Total	87,050	100.00
Source: Kentucky State Board of Elections

== Election results from statewide races ==
=== 2014 – 2020 ===
Year	Office	Results (Note: Figures presented in this table are calculated by summing precinct election results published by the Kentucky State Board of Elections, using precinct data that list each precinct's senatorial district.)
2014	Senator	McConnell 62.8 - 33.2%
2015	Governor	Bevin 62.0 - 34.8%
2015	Secretary of State	Knipper 57.7 - 42.3%
2015	Attorney General	Westerfield 59.9 - 40.1%
2015	Auditor of Public Accounts	Harmon 63.9 - 36.1%
2015	State Treasurer	Ball 70.0 - 30.0%
2015	Commissioner of Agriculture	Quarles 70.0 - 30.0%
2016	President	Trump 75.8 - 20.7%
2016	Senator	Paul 66.7 - 33.3%
2019	Governor	Bevin 61.8 - 36.3%
2019	Secretary of State	Adams 67.2 - 32.8%
2019	Attorney General	Cameron 70.5 - 29.5%
2019	Auditor of Public Accounts	Harmon 68.8 - 28.6%
2019	State Treasurer	Ball 73.4 - 26.6%
2019	Commissioner of Agriculture	Quarles 71.1 - 26.3%
2020	President	Trump 76.5 - 22.1%
2020	Senator	McConnell 70.1 - 24.9%
2020	Amendment 1	Yes 58.2 - 41.8%
2020	Amendment 2	No 66.7 - 33.3%

=== 2022 – present ===
Year	Office	Results
2022	Senator	Paul 71.5 - 28.5%
2022	Amendment 1	Yes 51.0 - 49.0%
2022	Amendment 2	Yes 55.6 - 44.4%
2023	Governor	Cameron 57.6 - 42.4%
2023	Secretary of State	Adams 69.9 - 30.0%
2023	Attorney General	Coleman 67.8 - 32.2%
2023	Auditor of Public Accounts	Ball 70.4 - 29.6%
2023	State Treasurer	Metcalf 66.5 - 33.5%
2023	Commissioner of Agriculture	Shell 70.3 - 29.7%
2024	President	Trump 74.3 - 24.5%
2024	Amendment 1	Yes 63.3 - 36.7%
2024	Amendment 2	No 66.6 - 33.4%

== List of members representing the district ==
Member	Party	Years	Electoral history	District location
J. C. Carter (Scottsville)	Republican	January 1, 1968 – January 1, 1972	Elected in 1967. Lost renomination.	1964–1972
Walter Arnold Baker (Glasgow)	Republican	January 1, 1972 – June 15, 1981	Elected in 1971. Reelected in 1975. Reelected in 1979. Resigned to join the administration of Ronald Reagan.	1972–1974
Walter Arnold Baker (Glasgow)	Republican	January 1, 1972 – June 15, 1981	Elected in 1971. Reelected in 1975. Reelected in 1979. Resigned to join the administration of Ronald Reagan.	1974–1984
Joe Lane Travis (Glasgow)	Republican	November 1981 – January 1, 1989	Elected to finish Baker's term. Reelected in 1983. Lost renomination.	1974–1984
Joe Lane Travis (Glasgow)	Republican	November 1981 – January 1, 1989	Elected to finish Baker's term. Reelected in 1983. Lost renomination.	1984–1993; Allen, Barren, Butler (part), Edmonson, Monroe, Ohio (part), and Simpson Counties.
Walter Arnold Baker (Glasgow)	Republican	January 1, 1989 – April 15, 1996	Elected in 1988. Reelected in 1992. Resigned to become a Justice of the Kentucky Supreme Court.	1984–1993; Allen, Barren, Butler (part), Edmonson, Monroe, Ohio (part), and Simpson Counties.
Walter Arnold Baker (Glasgow)	Republican	January 1, 1989 – April 15, 1996	Elected in 1988. Reelected in 1992. Resigned to become a Justice of the Kentucky Supreme Court.	1993–1997
Richie Sanders (Smiths Grove)	Republican	June 1996 – January 1, 2009	Elected to finish Baker's term. Reelected in 1996. Reelected in 2000. Reelected in 2004. Retired.	1993–1997
Richie Sanders (Smiths Grove)	Republican	June 1996 – January 1, 2009	Elected to finish Baker's term. Reelected in 1996. Reelected in 2000. Reelected in 2004. Retired.	1997–2003
Richie Sanders (Smiths Grove)	Republican	June 1996 – January 1, 2009	Elected to finish Baker's term. Reelected in 1996. Reelected in 2000. Reelected in 2004. Retired.	2003–2015
David P. Givens (Greensburg)	Republican	January 1, 2009 – present	Elected in 2008. Reelected in 2012. Reelected in 2016. Reelected in 2020. Reelected in 2024.	2003–2015
David P. Givens (Greensburg)	Republican	January 1, 2009 – present	Elected in 2008. Reelected in 2012. Reelected in 2016. Reelected in 2020. Reelected in 2024.	2015–2023
David P. Givens (Greensburg)	Republican	January 1, 2009 – present	Elected in 2008. Reelected in 2012. Reelected in 2016. Reelected in 2020. Reelected in 2024.	2023–present
