= Kentucky's 37th Senate district =

American legislative district

Kentucky's 37th State Senate district
Senator
Gary Clemons; D–Louisville
since January 6, 2026
- Registration: 57.8% Democratic; 30.6% Republican; 11.1% No party preference
- Demographics: 58.7% White; 23.2% Black; 9.0% Hispanic; 3.2% Asian; 0.1% Hawaiian/Pacific Islander; 0.5% Other; 5.1% Multiracial
- Population (2023): 112,841
- Registered voters (2025): 80,960

Kentucky's 37th Senatorial district is one of 38 districts in the Kentucky Senate. It comprises part of Jefferson County. It has been represented by Gary Clemons (D–Louisville) since 2026. As of 2023, the district had a population of 112,841.

From 1986 to 1989 and 1993 to 2005, the district was represented by Larry Saunders, who was president of the Senate from 1997 to 2000.

== Voter registration ==
On January 1, 2025, the district had 80,960 registered voters, who were registered with the following parties.

Party	Registration	
Party	Voters	%
Democratic	46,761	57.76
Republican	24,767	30.59
Independent	3,678	4.54
Libertarian	330	0.41
Green	83	0.10
Constitution	28	0.03
Socialist Workers	20	0.02
Reform	8	0.01
"Other"	5,285	6.53
Total	80,960	100.00
Source: Kentucky State Board of Elections

== Election results from statewide races ==
=== 2022 – present ===
Year	Office	Results (Note: Figures presented in this table are calculated by summing precinct election results published by the Kentucky State Board of Elections, using precinct data that list each precinct's senatorial district.)
2022	Senator	Booker 54.0 - 46.0%
2022	Amendment 1	No 65.3 - 34.7%
2022	Amendment 2	No 67.6 - 32.4%
2023	Governor	Beshear 68.7 - 31.3%
2023	Secretary of State	Wheatley 57.8 - 42.2%
2023	Attorney General	Stevenson 58.7 - 41.3%
2023	Auditor of Public Accounts	Reeder 57.7 - 42.3%
2023	State Treasurer	Bowman 60.9 - 39.1%
2023	Commissioner of Agriculture	Enlow 58.9 - 41.1%
2024	President	Harris 51.8 - 46.4%
2024	Amendment 1	Yes 53.6 - 46.4%
2024	Amendment 2	No 66.3 - 33.7%

== List of members representing the district ==
Member	Party	Years	Electoral history	District location
Charles McCann (Louisville)	Democratic	January 1, 1948 – January 1, 1968	Elected in 1947. Reelected in 1951. Reelected in 1955. Reelected in 1959. Reelected in 1963. Lost renomination.	1944–1964; Jefferson County (part).
Charles McCann (Louisville)	Democratic	January 1, 1948 – January 1, 1968	Elected in 1947. Reelected in 1951. Reelected in 1955. Reelected in 1959. Reelected in 1963. Lost renomination.	1964–1972
Henry Beach (Louisville)	Democratic	January 1, 1968 – January 1, 1972	Elected in 1967. Retired to run for lt. governor.	1964–1972
Danny Yocom (Louisville)	Democratic	January 1, 1972 – September 5, 1986	Elected in 1971. Reelected in 1975. Reelected in 1979. Reelected in 1983. Resigned due to health issues.	1972–1974
Danny Yocom (Louisville)	Democratic	January 1, 1972 – September 5, 1986	Elected in 1971. Reelected in 1975. Reelected in 1979. Reelected in 1983. Resigned due to health issues.	1974–1984
Danny Yocom (Louisville)	Democratic	January 1, 1972 – September 5, 1986	Elected in 1971. Reelected in 1975. Reelected in 1979. Reelected in 1983. Resigned due to health issues.	1984–1993; Jefferson County (part).
Larry Saunders (Louisville)	Democratic	November 14, 1986 – January 1, 1989	Elected to finish Yocom's term. Lost renomination.	1984–1993; Jefferson County (part).
Dan Seum (Louisville)	Democratic	January 1, 1989 – January 1, 1993	Elected in 1988. Lost renomination.	1984–1993; Jefferson County (part).
Larry Saunders (Louisville)	Democratic	January 1, 1993 – January 1, 2005	Elected in 1992. Reelected in 1996. Reelected in 2000. Retired.	1993–1997
Larry Saunders (Louisville)	Democratic	January 1, 1993 – January 1, 2005	Elected in 1992. Reelected in 1996. Reelected in 2000. Retired.	1997–2003
Larry Saunders (Louisville)	Democratic	January 1, 1993 – January 1, 2005	Elected in 1992. Reelected in 1996. Reelected in 2000. Retired.	2003–2015
Vacant		January 1, 2005 – February 16, 2006	Election voided.	2003–2015
Perry B. Clark (Louisville)	Democratic	February 16, 2006 – January 1, 2021	Elected to the vacant term. Reelected in 2008. Reelected in 2012. Reelected in 2016. Retired.	2003–2015
Perry B. Clark (Louisville)	Democratic	February 16, 2006 – January 1, 2021	Elected to the vacant term. Reelected in 2008. Reelected in 2012. Reelected in 2016. Retired.	2015–2023
David Yates (Louisville)	Democratic	January 1, 2021 – October 8, 2025	Elected in 2020. Reelected in 2024. Resigned to become Jefferson County Clerk.	2015–2023
David Yates (Louisville)	Democratic	January 1, 2021 – October 8, 2025	Elected in 2020. Reelected in 2024. Resigned to become Jefferson County Clerk.	2023–present
Gary Clemons (Louisville)	Democratic	January 6, 2026 – present	Elected to finish Yates's term.	2023–present
