= Kentucky's 23rd Senate district =

American legislative district

Kentucky's 23rd State Senate district
Senator
Christian McDaniel; R–Ryland Heights
since January 1, 2013
- Registration: 44.8% Republican; 38.2% Democratic; 16.1% No party preference
- Demographics: 84.3% White; 4.5% Black; 5.3% Hispanic; 1.2% Asian; 0.1% Native American; 0.3% Other; 4.4% Multiracial
- Population (2023): 123,471
- Registered voters (2025): 107,727

Kentucky's 23rd Senatorial district is one of 38 districts in the Kentucky Senate. It comprises part of Kenton County. It has been represented by Christian McDaniel (R–Ryland Heights) since 2013. As of 2023, the district had a population of 123,471.

== Voter registration ==
On January 1, 2025, the district had 107,727 registered voters, who were registered with the following parties.

Party	Registration	
Party	Voters	%
Republican	48,299	44.83
Democratic	41,101	38.15
Independent	7,513	6.97
Libertarian	709	0.66
Green	148	0.14
Constitution	41	0.04
Socialist Workers	37	0.03
Reform	5	0.00
"Other"	9,874	9.17
Total	107,727	100.00
Source: Kentucky State Board of Elections

== Election results from statewide races ==
=== 2022 – present ===
Year	Office	Results (Note: Figures presented in this table are calculated by summing precinct election results published by the Kentucky State Board of Elections, using precinct data that list each precinct's senatorial district.)
2022	Senator	Paul 56.6 - 43.4%
2022	Amendment 1	No 50.7 - 49.3%
2022	Amendment 2	No 56.2 - 43.8%
2023	Governor	Beshear 55.2 - 44.8%
2023	Secretary of State	Adams 52.7 - 47.2%
2023	Attorney General	Coleman 52.7 - 47.3%
2023	Auditor of Public Accounts	Ball 55.1 - 44.9%
2023	State Treasurer	Metcalf 53.7 - 46.3%
2023	Commissioner of Agriculture	Shell 54.1 - 45.9%
2024	President	Trump 56.6 - 41.4%
2024	Amendment 1	Yes 65.0 - 35.0%
2024	Amendment 2	No 59.5 - 40.5%

== List of members representing the district ==
Member	Party	Years	Electoral history	District location
Bill Engle (Hazard)	Democratic	January 1, 1964 – January 1, 1968	Elected in 1963. Retired.	1964–1972
Pearl Strong (Ary)	Democratic	January 1, 1968 – January 1, 1972	Elected in 1967. Redistricted to the 29th district and lost renomination.	1964–1972
Gus Sheehan (Covington)	Democratic	January 1, 1972 – January 1, 1989	Elected in 1971. Reelected in 1975. Reelected in 1979. Reelected in 1983. Lost renomination.	1972–1974
Gus Sheehan (Covington)	Democratic	January 1, 1972 – January 1, 1989	Elected in 1971. Reelected in 1975. Reelected in 1979. Reelected in 1983. Lost renomination.	1974–1984
Gus Sheehan (Covington)	Democratic	January 1, 1972 – January 1, 1989	Elected in 1971. Reelected in 1975. Reelected in 1979. Reelected in 1983. Lost renomination.	1984–1993; Kenton (part) and Pendleton (part) Counties.
Joseph U. Meyer (Covington)	Democratic	January 1, 1989 – January 1, 1997	Elected in 1988. Reelected in 1992. Lost reelection.	1984–1993; Kenton (part) and Pendleton (part) Counties.
Joseph U. Meyer (Covington)	Democratic	January 1, 1989 – January 1, 1997	Elected in 1988. Reelected in 1992. Lost reelection.	1993–1997
Jack Westwood (Erlanger)	Republican	January 1, 1997 – January 1, 2013	Elected in 1996. Reelected in 2000. Reelected in 2004. Reelected in 2008. Retired.	1997–2003
Jack Westwood (Erlanger)	Republican	January 1, 1997 – January 1, 2013	Elected in 1996. Reelected in 2000. Reelected in 2004. Reelected in 2008. Retired.	2003–2015
Christian McDaniel (Ryland Heights)	Republican	January 1, 2013 – present	Elected in 2012. Reelected in 2016. Reelected in 2020. Reelected in 2024.	2003–2015
Christian McDaniel (Ryland Heights)	Republican	January 1, 2013 – present	Elected in 2012. Reelected in 2016. Reelected in 2020. Reelected in 2024.	2015–2023
Christian McDaniel (Ryland Heights)	Republican	January 1, 2013 – present	Elected in 2012. Reelected in 2016. Reelected in 2020. Reelected in 2024.	2023–present
