= Kentucky's 31st Senate district =

American legislative district

Kentucky's 31st State Senate district
Senator
Phillip Wheeler; R–Pikeville
since March 19, 2019
- Registration: 51.2% Republican; 41.7% Democratic; 6.8% No party preference
- Demographics: 94.2% White; 1.3% Black; 1.1% Hispanic; 0.7% Asian; 0.1% Native American; 0.1% Hawaiian/Pacific Islander; 2.5% Multiracial
- Population (2023): 114,618
- Registered voters (2025): 87,645

Kentucky's 31st Senatorial district is one of 38 districts in the Kentucky Senate. Located in the eastern part of the state, it comprises the counties of Elliott, Johnson, Lawrence, Martin, and Pike. It has been represented by Phillip Wheeler (R–Pikeville) since 2019. As of 2023, the district had a population of 114,618.

== Voter registration ==
On January 1, 2025, the district had 87,645 registered voters, who were registered with the following parties.

Party	Registration	
Party	Voters	%
Republican	44,840	51.16
Democratic	36,550	41.70
Independent	2,838	3.24
Libertarian	228	0.26
Green	30	0.03
Constitution	20	0.02
Socialist Workers	12	0.01
Reform	5	0.01
"Other"	3,122	3.56
Total	87,645	100.00
Source: Kentucky State Board of Elections

== Election results from statewide races ==
=== 2014 – 2020 ===
Year	Office	Results (Note: Figures presented in this table are calculated by summing precinct election results published by the Kentucky State Board of Elections, using precinct data that list each precinct's senatorial district.)
2014	Senator	McConnell 61.3 - 35.5%
2015	Governor	Bevin 56.3 - 40.6%
2015	Secretary of State	Knipper 51.6 - 48.4%
2015	Attorney General	Beshear 50.02 - 49.98%
2015	Auditor of Public Accounts	Harmon 53.6 - 46.4%
2015	State Treasurer	Ball 57.6 - 42.4%
2015	Commissioner of Agriculture	Quarles 59.1 - 40.9%
2016	President	Trump 79.7 - 17.6%
2016	Senator	Paul 60.8 - 39.2%
2019	Governor	Bevin 55.1 - 42.4%
2019	Secretary of State	Adams 60.3 - 39.7%
2019	Attorney General	Cameron 59.6 - 40.4%
2019	Auditor of Public Accounts	Harmon 61.9 - 35.5%
2019	State Treasurer	Ball 66.3 - 33.7%
2019	Commissioner of Agriculture	Quarles 62.2 - 35.1%
2020	President	Trump 80.2 - 18.7%
2020	Senator	McConnell 73.3 - 23.0%
2020	Amendment 1	Yes 50.7 - 49.3%
2020	Amendment 2	No 69.9 - 30.1%

=== 2022 – present ===
Year	Office	Results
2022	Senator	Paul 76.4 - 23.6%
2022	Amendment 1	Yes 51.8 - 48.2%
2022	Amendment 2	Yes 63.9 - 36.1%
2023	Governor	Cameron 58.0 - 42.0%
2023	Secretary of State	Adams 71.9 - 28.1%
2023	Attorney General	Coleman 71.3 - 28.7%
2023	Auditor of Public Accounts	Ball 73.2 - 26.8%
2023	State Treasurer	Metcalf 69.0 - 31.0%
2023	Commissioner of Agriculture	Shell 72.6 - 27.4%
2024	President	Trump 83.4 - 15.5%
2024	Amendment 1	Yes 64.8 - 35.2%
2024	Amendment 2	No 68.2 - 31.8%

== List of members representing the district ==
Member	Party	Years	Electoral history	District location
Edgar Owen Billington (Murray)	Democratic	January 1, 1964 – January 1, 1968	Elected in 1963. [data missing]	1964–1968
Francis M. Burke (Pikeville)	Democratic	January 1, 1968 – January 1, 1972	Elected in 1967. Lost renomination.	1968–1972
Kelsey Friend Sr. (Pikeville)	Democratic	January 1, 1972 – January 1, 1980	Elected in 1971. Reelected in 1975. Lost renomination.	1972–1974
Kelsey Friend Sr. (Pikeville)	Democratic	January 1, 1972 – January 1, 1980	Elected in 1971. Reelected in 1975. Lost renomination.	1974–1984
John Doug Hays (Pikeville)	Democratic	January 1, 1980 – January 1, 1984	Elected in 1979. Lost renomination.	1974–1984
Kelsey Friend Sr. (Pikeville)	Democratic	January 1, 1984 – January 1, 1997	Elected in 1983. Reelected in 1988. Reelected in 1992. Lost renomination.	1984–1993; Letcher (part), Martin (part), and Pike Counties.
Kelsey Friend Sr. (Pikeville)	Democratic	January 1, 1984 – January 1, 1997	Elected in 1983. Reelected in 1988. Reelected in 1992. Lost renomination.	1993–1997
Gary C. Johnson (Pikeville)	Democratic	January 1, 1997 – January 1, 2001	Elected in 1996. Retired.	1997–2003
Ray Jones II (Pikeville)	Democratic	January 1, 2001 – January 7, 2019	Elected in 2000. Reelected in 2004. Reelected in 2008. Reelected in 2012. Reelected in 2016. Resigned after being elected Judge/Executive of Pike County.	1997–2003
Ray Jones II (Pikeville)	Democratic	January 1, 2001 – January 7, 2019	Elected in 2000. Reelected in 2004. Reelected in 2008. Reelected in 2012. Reelected in 2016. Resigned after being elected Judge/Executive of Pike County.	2003–2015
Ray Jones II (Pikeville)	Democratic	January 1, 2001 – January 7, 2019	Elected in 2000. Reelected in 2004. Reelected in 2008. Reelected in 2012. Reelected in 2016. Resigned after being elected Judge/Executive of Pike County.	2015–2023
Phillip Wheeler (Pikeville)	Republican	March 19, 2019 – present	Elected to finish Jones's term. Reelected in 2020. Reelected in 2024.	2015–2023
Phillip Wheeler (Pikeville)	Republican	March 19, 2019 – present	Elected to finish Jones's term. Reelected in 2020. Reelected in 2024.	2023–present
