= Senator Bailey =

Senator Bailey may refer to:

== Members of the United States Senate ==
- James E. Bailey (1822–1885), U.S. Senator from Tennessee from 1877 to 1881
- Joseph Weldon Bailey (1862–1929), U.S. Senator from Texas from 1901 to 1913
- Josiah Bailey (1873–1946), U.S. Senator from North Carolina between 1931 and 1946
- Theodorus Bailey (politician) (1758–1828), U.S. Senator from New York from 1803 to 1804

== United States state senate member ==
- Alexander H. Bailey (1817–1874), New York State Senate
- Benny Ray Bailey (born 1944), Kentucky State Senate
- Billy Wayne Bailey (born 1957), West Virginia State Senate
- Dana Reed Bailey (1833–1908), Vermont State Senate and Wisconsin State Senate
- Daniel A. Bailey (1894–1970), Pennsylvania State Senate
- David Jackson Bailey (1812–1897), Georgia State Senate
- Goldsmith Bailey (1823–1862), Massachusetts State Senate
- Jamaal Bailey (fl. 2010s), New York State Senate
- Jack Bailey (Maryland politician) (born 1965), Maryland State Senate
- John H. Bailey (1864–1940), Texas State Senate
- John O. Bailey (1880–1959), Oregon State Senate
- Joseph Bailey (congressman) (1810–1885), Pennsylvania State Senate
- Martin B. Bailey (1857–1934), Illinois State Senate
- Morton Shelley Bailey (1855–1922), Colorado State Senate
- Paul Bailey (politician) (born 1968), Tennessee State Senate
- Taber D. Bailey (1874–1938), Maine State Senate
