= 2016 Kentucky Senate election =

- November 8, 2016

19 out of 38 seats in the Kentucky Senate 20 seats needed for a majority
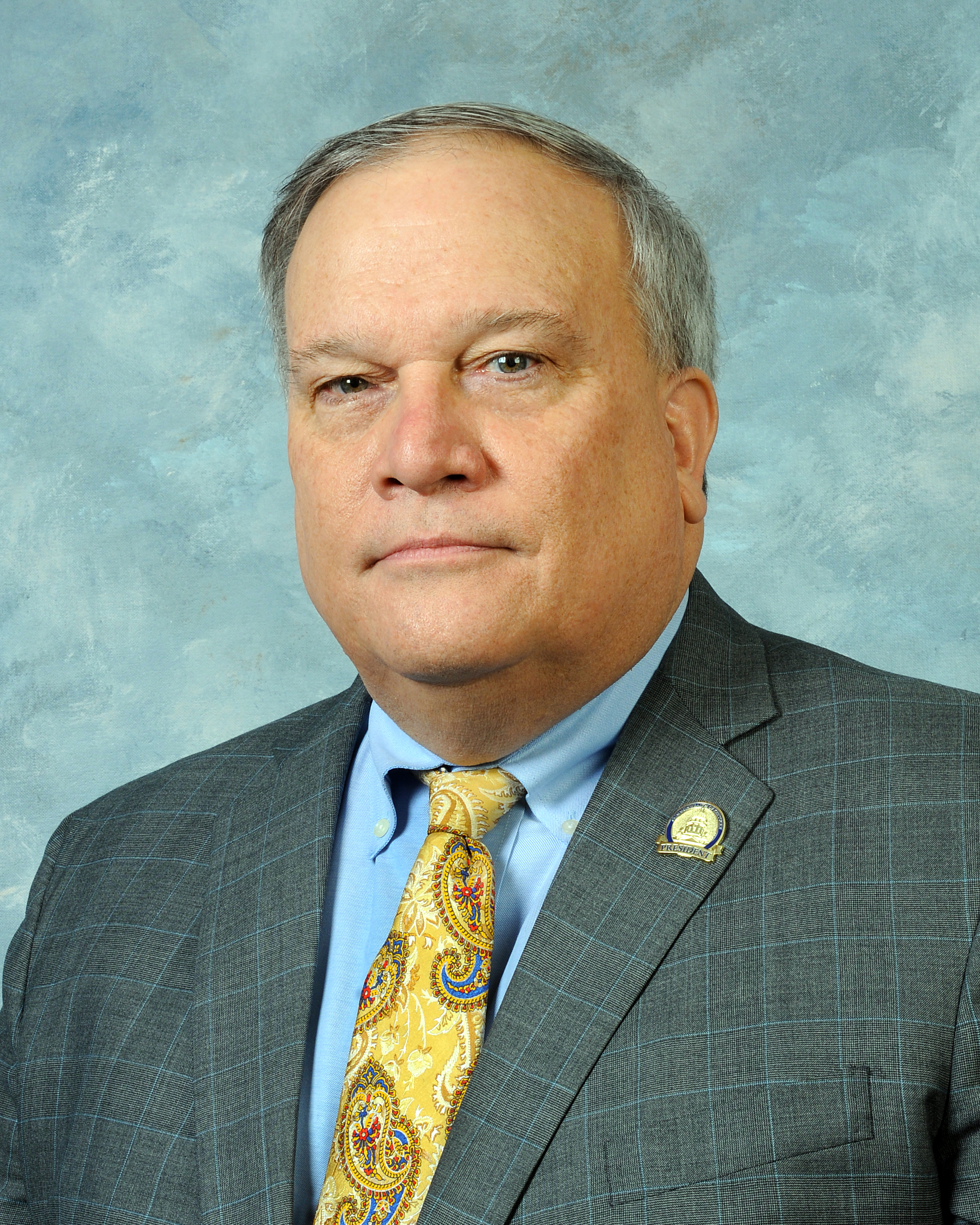

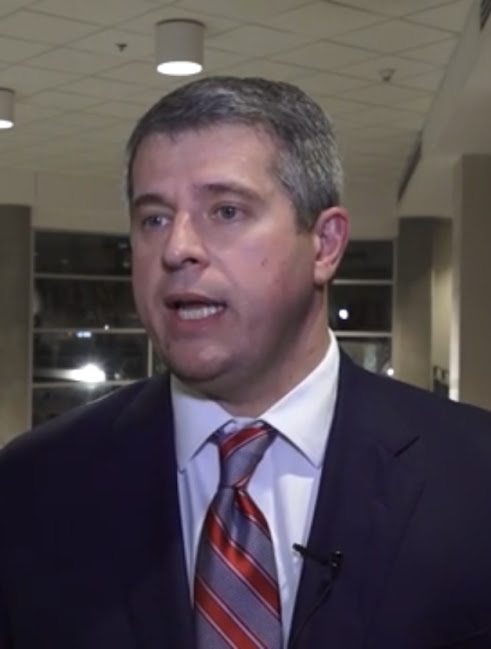
	Majority party	Minority party
Leader	Robert Stivers	Ray Jones
Party	Republican	Democratic
Leader since	January 8, 2013	January 6, 2015
Leader's seat	25th – Manchester	31st – Pikeville
Last election	26	12
Seats before	27 (Note: Republican Steve West was elected in March 2015 to fill the vacant seat of Democrat Walter Blevins.)	11
Seats won	27	11
Seat change	Steady	Steady
Seats up	11	8
Races won	11	8
- Republican hold Democratic hold 60–70% 70–80% >90% 60–70% 80–90% >90%
Senate President before election
Robert Stivers
Republican
Elected Senate President
Robert Stivers
Republican

The 2016 Kentucky Senate election was held on November 8, 2016. The Republican and Democratic primary elections were held on May 17. Half of the senate (all odd-numbered seats) were up for election. Republicans maintained their majority in the chamber without gaining or losing any seats.

A numbered map of the senate districts at the time can be viewed here.

== Overview ==
Party	Candidates		Votes	%	Seats			
Party	Opposed	Unopposed	Votes	%	Before	Won	After	+/−
Republican	6	7	420,578	56.12	27	11	27	-
Democratic	6	6	328,915	43.88	11	8	11	-
Total	12	13	749,493	100.00	38	19	38	±0
Source: Kentucky Secretary of State

== Retiring incumbents ==
A total of two senators retired, neither of whom ran for other offices.

=== Republican ===
1. 5th: Carroll Gibson (Leitchfield): Retired.
2. 15th: Chris Girdler (Somerset): Retired.

== Incumbents defeated ==
No incumbents lost renomination or reelection.

== Summary by district ==
Certified results by the Kentucky Secretary of State are available online for the primary election and general election.

† – Incumbent not seeking re-election

District	Incumbent	Party	Elected	Party
1	Stan Humphries	Rep	Stan Humphries	Rep
3	Whitney H. Westerfield	Rep	Whitney H. Westerfield	Rep
5	Carroll Gibson†	Rep	Stephen L. Meredith	Rep
7	Julian M. Carroll	Dem	Julian M. Carroll	Dem
9	David P. Givens	Rep	David P. Givens	Rep
11	John Schickel	Rep	John Schickel	Rep
13	Reggie Thomas	Dem	Reggie Thomas	Dem
15	Chris Girdler†	Rep	Rick Girdler	Rep
17	Damon Thayer	Rep	Damon Thayer	Rep
19	Morgan McGarvey	Dem	Morgan McGarvey	Dem
21	Albert Robinson	Rep	Albert Robinson	Rep
23	Chris McDaniel	Rep	Chris McDaniel	Rep
25	Robert Stivers	Rep	Robert Stivers	Rep
27	Stephen West	Rep	Stephen West	Rep
29	Johnny Ray Turner	Dem	Johnny Ray Turner	Dem
31	Ray Jones	Dem	Ray Jones	Dem
33	Gerald A. Neal	Dem	Gerald A. Neal	Dem
35	Denise Harper Angel	Dem	Denise Harper Angel	Dem
37	Perry B. Clark	Dem	Perry B. Clark	Dem

== Closest races ==
There were no seats where the margin of victory was under 10%.

== Predictions ==
Source	Ranking	As of
Governing	Safe R	October 12, 2016

== Special elections ==
=== District 27 special ===
Results by county: West: 50–60%; 60–70%; 70–80%; Caudill: 50–60%; 60–70%

Steve West was elected in March 2015 following the resignation of Walter Blevins.

2015 Kentucky Senate 27th district special election
Party	Candidate	Votes	%
Republican	Steve West	5,337	54.4
Democratic	Kelly Caudill	4,471	45.6
Total votes		9,808	100.0
Republican gain from Democratic			

== District 1 ==
Incumbent senator Stan Humphries won reelection unopposed.

=== Republican primary ===
==== Candidates ====
===== Nominee =====
- Stan Humphries, incumbent senator

=== General election ===
==== Results ====
2016 Kentucky Senate 1st district election
Party	Candidate	Votes	%
Republican	Stan Humphries (incumbent)	Unopposed	
Total votes		36,264	100.0
Republican hold			

== District 3 ==
Incumbent senator Whitney H. Westerfield won reelection unopposed.

=== Republican primary ===
==== Candidates ====
===== Nominee =====
- Whitney H. Westerfield, incumbent senator

=== General election ===
==== Results ====
2016 Kentucky Senate 3rd district election
Party	Candidate	Votes	%
Republican	Whitney H. Westerfield (incumbent)	Unopposed	
Total votes		28,655	100.0
Republican hold			

== District 5 ==
Incumbent senator Carroll Gibson did not seek reelection. He was succeeded by Republican Stephen L. Meredith.

=== Democratic primary ===
==== Candidates ====
===== Nominee =====
- Leslie J. Stith

===== Eliminated in primary =====
- Ricky Alvey

==== Results ====
Democratic primary results
Party	Candidate	Votes	%
Democratic	Leslie J. Stith	5,470	52.3
Democratic	Ricky Alvey	4,990	47.7
Total votes		10,460	100.0

=== Republican primary ===
==== Candidates ====
===== Nominee =====
- Stephen L. Meredith

=== General election ===
==== Results ====
2016 Kentucky Senate 5th district election
Party	Candidate	Votes	%
Republican	Stephen L. Meredith	31,096	63.3
Democratic	Leslie J. Stith	18,006	36.7
Total votes		49,102	100.0
Republican hold			

== District 7 ==
Incumbent senator Julian M. Carroll won reelection unopposed.

=== Democratic primary ===
==== Candidates ====
===== Nominee =====
- Julian M. Carroll, incumbent senator

=== General election ===
==== Results ====
2016 Kentucky Senate 7th district election
Party	Candidate	Votes	%
Democratic	Julian M. Carroll (incumbent)	Unopposed	
Total votes		39,851	100.0
Democratic hold			

== District 9 ==
Incumbent senator David P. Givens won reelection unopposed.

=== Republican primary ===
==== Candidates ====
===== Nominee =====
- David P. Givens, incumbent senator

=== General election ===
==== Results ====
2016 Kentucky Senate 9th district election
Party	Candidate	Votes	%
Republican	David P. Givens (incumbent)	Unopposed	
Total votes		37,791	100.0
Republican hold			

== District 11 ==
Incumbent senator John Schickel won reelection, defeating primary election challenger Josh L. Turner.

=== Republican primary ===
==== Candidates ====
===== Nominee =====
- John Schickel, incumbent senator

===== Eliminated in primary =====
- Josh L. Turner

==== Results ====
Republican primary results
Party	Candidate	Votes	%
Republican	John Schickel (incumbent)	4,804	80.9
Republican	Josh L. Turner	1,137	19.1
Total votes		5,941	100.0

=== General election ===
==== Results ====
2016 Kentucky Senate 11th district election
Party	Candidate	Votes	%
Republican	John Schickel (incumbent)	Unopposed	
Total votes		47,552	100.0
Republican hold			

== District 13 ==
Incumbent senator Reggie Thomas won reelection unopposed.

=== Democratic primary ===
==== Candidates ====
===== Nominee =====
- Reggie Thomas, incumbent senator

=== General election ===
==== Results ====
2016 Kentucky Senate 13th district election
Party	Candidate	Votes	%
Democratic	Reggie Thomas (incumbent)	Unopposed	
Total votes		33,373	100.0
Democratic hold			

== District 15 ==
Incumbent senator Chris Girdler did not seek reelection. He was succeeded by Republican Rick Girdler.

=== Republican primary ===
==== Candidates ====
===== Nominee =====
- Rick Girdler

===== Eliminated in primary =====
- Michael Keck
- Don Moss
- Joshua Nichols

==== Results ====
Republican primary results
Party	Candidate	Votes	%
Republican	Rick Girdler	3,395	31.7
Republican	Don Moss	2,638	24.7
Republican	Michael Keck	2,449	22.9
Republican	Joshua Nichols	2,214	20.7
Total votes		10,696	100.0

=== General election ===
==== Results ====
2016 Kentucky Senate 15th district election
Party	Candidate	Votes	%
Republican	Rick Girdler	Unopposed	
Total votes		39,614	100.0
Republican hold			

== District 17 ==
Incumbent senator Damon Thayer won reelection, defeating Democratic candidate Charlie Hoffman.

=== Democratic primary ===
==== Candidates ====
===== Nominee =====
- Charlie Hoffman

=== Republican primary ===
==== Candidates ====
===== Nominee =====
- Damon Thayer, incumbent senator

=== General election ===
==== Results ====
2016 Kentucky Senate 17th district election
Party	Candidate	Votes	%
Republican	Damon Thayer (incumbent)	36,656	67.9
Democratic	Charlie Hoffman	17,302	32.1
Total votes		53,958	100.0
Republican hold			

== District 19 ==
Incumbent senator Morgan McGarvey won reelection, defeating Republican candidate Larry West.

=== Democratic primary ===
==== Candidates ====
===== Nominee =====
- Morgan McGarvey, incumbent senator

=== Republican primary ===
==== Candidates ====
===== Nominee =====
- Larry West

=== General election ===
==== Results ====
2016 Kentucky Senate 19th district election
Party	Candidate	Votes	%
Democratic	Morgan McGarvey (incumbent)	39,026	61.7
Republican	Larry West	24,214	38.3
Total votes		63,240	100.0
Democratic hold			

== District 21 ==
Incumbent senator Albert Robinson won reelection, defeating primary and general election challengers.

=== Democratic primary ===
==== Candidates ====
===== Nominee =====
- Janice Odom

=== Republican primary ===
==== Candidates ====
===== Nominee =====
- Albert Robinson, incumbent senator

===== Eliminated in primary =====
- Michael Bryant

==== Results ====
Republican primary results
Party	Candidate	Votes	%
Republican	Albert Robinson (incumbent)	5,005	55.4
Republican	Michael Bryant	4,034	44.6
Total votes		9,039	100.0

=== General election ===
==== Results ====
2016 Kentucky Senate 21st district election
Party	Candidate	Votes	%
Republican	Albert Robinson (incumbent)	33,770	75.1
Democratic	Janice Odom	11,185	24.9
Total votes		44,955	100.0
Republican hold			

== District 23 ==
Incumbent senator Chris McDaniel won reelection unopposed.

=== Republican primary ===
==== Candidates ====
===== Nominee =====
- Chris McDaniel, incumbent senator

=== General election ===
==== Results ====
2016 Kentucky Senate 23rd district election
Party	Candidate	Votes	%
Republican	Chris McDaniel (incumbent)	Unopposed	
Total votes		37,409	100.0
Republican hold			

== District 25 ==
Incumbent senator Robert Stivers won reelection unopposed.

=== Republican primary ===
==== Candidates ====
===== Nominee =====
- Robert Stivers, incumbent senator

=== General election ===
==== Results ====
2016 Kentucky Senate 25th district election
Party	Candidate	Votes	%
Republican	Robert Stivers (incumbent)	Unopposed	
Total votes		30,577	100.0
Republican hold			

== District 27 ==
Incumbent senator Stephen West won reelection, defeating Democratic candidate Charles L. Linville III.

=== Democratic primary ===
==== Candidates ====
===== Nominee =====
- Charles L. Linville III

=== Republican primary ===
==== Candidates ====
===== Nominee =====
- Stephen West, incumbent senator

=== General election ===
==== Results ====
2016 Kentucky Senate 27th district election
Party	Candidate	Votes	%
Republican	Stephen West (incumbent)	30,548	67.5
Democratic	Charles L. Linville III	14,681	32.5
Total votes		45,229	100.0
Republican hold			

== District 29 ==
Incumbent senator Johnny Ray Turner won reelection unopposed.

=== Democratic primary ===
==== Candidates ====
===== Nominee =====
- Johnny Ray Turner, incumbent senator

=== General election ===
==== Results ====
2016 Kentucky Senate 29th district election
Party	Candidate	Votes	%
Democratic	Johnny Ray Turner (incumbent)	Unopposed	
Total votes		26,890	100.0
Democratic hold			

== District 31 ==
Incumbent senator Ray Jones won reelection, defeating primary election challenger Glenn Martin Hammond.

=== Democratic primary ===
==== Candidates ====
===== Nominee =====
- Ray Jones, incumbent senator

===== Eliminated in primary =====
- Glenn Martin Hammond

==== Results ====
Democratic primary results
Party	Candidate	Votes	%
Democratic	Ray Jones (incumbent)	9,527	71.1
Democratic	Glenn Martin Hammond	3,870	28.9
Total votes		13,397	100.0

=== General election ===
==== Results ====
2016 Kentucky Senate 31st district election
Party	Candidate	Votes	%
Democratic	Ray Jones (incumbent)	Unopposed	
Total votes		26,598	100.0
Democratic hold			

== District 33 ==
Incumbent senator Gerald A. Neal won reelection, defeating primary and general election challengers.

=== Democratic primary ===
==== Candidates ====
===== Nominee =====
- Gerald A. Neal, incumbent senator

===== Eliminated in primary =====
- Charles Booker
- Joan A. "Toni" Stringer

==== Results ====
Democratic primary results
Party	Candidate	Votes	%
Democratic	Gerald A. Neal (incumbent)	9,013	48.4
Democratic	Joan A. "Toni" Stringer	5,945	31.9
Democratic	Charles Booker	3,681	19.7
Total votes		18,639	100.0

=== Republican primary ===
==== Candidates ====
===== Nominee =====
- Shenita Rickman

===== Eliminated in primary =====
- John Yuen

==== Results ====
Republican primary results
Party	Candidate	Votes	%
Republican	Shenita Rickman	537	51.8
Republican	John Yuen	499	48.2
Total votes		1,036	100.0

=== General election ===
==== Results ====
2016 Kentucky Senate 33rd district election
Party	Candidate	Votes	%
Democratic	Gerald A. Neal (incumbent)	34,588	84.3
Republican	Shenita Rickman	6,432	15.7
Total votes		41,020	100.0
Democratic hold			

== District 35 ==
Incumbent senator Denise Harper Angel won reelection unopposed.

=== Democratic primary ===
==== Candidates ====
===== Nominee =====
- Denise Harper Angel, incumbent senator

=== General election ===
==== Results ====
2016 Kentucky Senate 35th district election
Party	Candidate	Votes	%
Democratic	Denise Harper Angel (incumbent)	Unopposed	
Total votes		35,860	100.0
Democratic hold			

== District 37 ==
Incumbent senator Perry B. Clark won reelection unopposed.

=== Democratic primary ===
==== Candidates ====
===== Nominee =====
- Perry B. Clark, incumbent senator

=== General election ===
==== Results ====
2016 Kentucky Senate 37th district election
Party	Candidate	Votes	%
Democratic	Perry B. Clark (incumbent)	Unopposed	
Total votes		31,555	100.0
Democratic hold			

== See also ==
- 2016 Kentucky elections
  - 2016 Kentucky House of Representatives election
  - 2016 United States Senate election in Kentucky
  - 2016 United States House of Representatives elections in Kentucky
