= Pat McCuiston =

American politician

Member of the Kentucky Senate from the 3rd district
- In office January 1, 1968 – January 1, 1993
- Preceded by: Owen Billington
- Succeeded by: Joey Pendleton

Personal details
- Born: September 8, 1917
- Died: May 3, 2002 (aged 84)
- Party: Democratic
- Education: Murray State University

Pat Michaux McCuiston (September 8, 1917 – May 3, 2002) was an American politician from Kentucky who served in the Kentucky Senate from 1968 to 1993. He was first elected to the Senate in 1967 and won reelection continuously until his defeat in the 1992 Democratic primary by Joey Pendleton.

On June 15, 1972, McCuiston was one of 20 Democratic senators who voted for Kentucky to ratify the Equal Rights Amendment.

A native of Kirksey, Kentucky, McCuiston graduated from Murray State University in 1939. He died in May 2002 at the age of 84.
