= Charles W. Berger =

American politician (1936–2016)

President pro tempore of the Kentucky Senate
- In office January 5, 1993 – January 1, 1997
- Preceded by: John A. Rose
- Succeeded by: Walter Blevins

Member of the Kentucky Senate from the 17th district
- In office January 1, 1980 – January 1, 1997
- Preceded by: Bert Pollitte
- Succeeded by: Glenn Freeman

Personal details
- Born: January 12, 1936 Mary Helen, Kentucky, U.S.
- Died: March 14, 2016 (aged 80) Lexington, Kentucky, U.S.
- Party: Democratic

Charles W. Berger (January 12, 1936 – March 14, 2016) was an American politician in the state of Kentucky. He served in the Kentucky Senate as a Democrat from 1980 to 1996. Berger died in Lexington, Kentucky on March 14, 2016, at the age of 80.
