= Dale Shrout =

American politician

Member of the Kentucky Senate from the 28th district
- In office January 1, 1999 – August 10, 2001
- Preceded by: John A. Rose
- Succeeded by: R. J. Palmer

Personal details
- Born: 1941 (age 84–85)
- Party: Democratic

Dale Shrout (born 1941) is an American politician from Kentucky who was a member of the Kentucky Senate from 1999 to 2001.

Shrout was first elected in 1998 after incumbent senator John A. Rose retired to run for Kentucky's 6th congressional district. He resigned from the senate in August 2001, having been appointed commissioner of the Kentucky Department of Vehicle Regulation by governor Paul E. Patton.
