= Kentucky's 28th Senate district =

American legislative district

Kentucky's 28th State Senate district
Senator
| Greg Elkins; R–Winchester |
since June 8, 2023
- Registration: 48.4% Democratic; 41.0% Republican; 10.0% No party preference
- Demographics: 80.8% White; 8.2% Black; 6.7% Hispanic; 1.8% Asian; 0.1% Native American; 0.2% Other; 2.2% Multiracial
- Population (2023): 122,356
- Registered voters (2025): 96,136

Kentucky's 28th Senatorial district is one of 38 districts in the Kentucky Senate. Located in the central part of the state, it comprises the counties of Bath, Clark, Menifee, Montgomery, and part of Fayette. It has been represented by Greg Elkins (R–Winchester) since 2023. As of 2023, the district had a population of 122,356.

From 1978 to 1999, the district was represented by John A. Rose, who was the first president of the Senate from 1993 to 1997.

== Voter registration ==
On January 1, 2025, the district had 96,136 registered voters, who were registered with the following parties.

| Party | Registration | |
| Party | Voters | % |
|---|---|---|
| Democratic | 46,493 | 48.36 |
| Republican | 39,428 | 41.01 |
| Independent | 4,386 | 4.56 |
| Libertarian | 426 | 0.44 |
| Green | 64 | 0.07 |
| Constitution | 48 | 0.05 |
| Socialist Workers | 12 | 0.01 |
| Reform | 5 | 0.01 |
| "Other" | 5,274 | 5.49 |
| Total | 96,136 | 100.00 |
Source: Kentucky State Board of Elections

== Election results from statewide races ==
=== 2022 – present ===
| Year | Office | Results (Note: Figures presented in this table are calculated by summing precinct election results published by the Kentucky State Board of Elections, using precinct data that list each precinct's senatorial district.) |
|---|---|---|
| 2022 | Senator | Paul 59.3 - 40.7% |
| 2022 | Amendment 1 | No 56.4 - 43.6% |
| 2022 | Amendment 2 | No 55.2 - 44.8% |
| 2023 | Governor | Beshear 57.3 - 42.7% |
| 2023 | Secretary of State | Adams 59.0 - 41.0% |
| 2023 | Attorney General | Coleman 54.9 - 45.1% |
| 2023 | Auditor of Public Accounts | Ball 58.4 - 41.6% |
| 2023 | State Treasurer | Metcalf 53.7 - 46.3% |
| 2023 | Commissioner of Agriculture | Shell 57.0 - 43.0% |
| 2024 | President | Trump 62.1 - 36.3% |
| 2024 | Amendment 1 | Yes 60.7 - 39.3% |
| 2024 | Amendment 2 | No 65.6 - 34.4% |

== List of members representing the district ==
| Member | Party | Years | Electoral history | District location |
|---|---|---|---|---|
| B. E. Billings (Stanton) | Democratic | January 1, 1970 – January 1, 1974 | Elected in 1969. Lost renomination. | 1964–1972 |
| B. E. Billings (Stanton) | Democratic | January 1, 1970 – January 1, 1974 | Elected in 1969. Lost renomination. | 1972–1974 |
| Walter Strong (Beattyville) | Democratic | January 1, 1974 – January 1, 1978 | Elected in 1973. Lost renomination. | 1974–1984 |
| John A. Rose (Winchester) | Democratic | January 1, 1978 – January 1, 1999 | Elected in 1977. Reelected in 1981. Reelected in 1986. Reelected in 1990. Reelected in 1994. Retired to run for Kentucky's; 6th congressional district. | 1974–1984 |
| John A. Rose (Winchester) | Democratic | January 1, 1978 – January 1, 1999 | Elected in 1977. Reelected in 1981. Reelected in 1986. Reelected in 1990. Reelected in 1994. Retired to run for Kentucky's; 6th congressional district. | 1984–1993; Bath, Clark, Estill, Fleming, Montgomery, and Powell Counties. |
| John A. Rose (Winchester) | Democratic | January 1, 1978 – January 1, 1999 | Elected in 1977. Reelected in 1981. Reelected in 1986. Reelected in 1990. Reelected in 1994. Retired to run for Kentucky's; 6th congressional district. | 1993–1997 |
| John A. Rose (Winchester) | Democratic | January 1, 1978 – January 1, 1999 | Elected in 1977. Reelected in 1981. Reelected in 1986. Reelected in 1990. Reelected in 1994. Retired to run for Kentucky's; 6th congressional district. | 1997–2003 |
| Dale Shrout (Mount Sterling) | Democratic | January 1, 1999 – August 10, 2001 | Elected in 1998. Resigned to become Commissioner of the Kentucky Department of Vehicle Regulation. | 1997–2003 |
| R. J. Palmer (Winchester) | Democratic | September 19, 2001 – January 1, 2015 | Elected to finish Shrout's term. Reelected in 2002. Reelected in 2006. Reelected in 2010. Lost reelection. | 1997–2003 |
| R. J. Palmer (Winchester) | Democratic | September 19, 2001 – January 1, 2015 | Elected to finish Shrout's term. Reelected in 2002. Reelected in 2006. Reelected in 2010. Lost reelection. | 2003–2015 |
| Ralph Alvarado (Winchester) | Republican | January 1, 2015 – January 6, 2023 | Elected in 2014. Reelected in 2018. Reelected in 2022. Resigned to become Commissioner of the Tennessee Department of Health. | 2015–2023 |
| Ralph Alvarado (Winchester) | Republican | January 1, 2015 – January 6, 2023 | Elected in 2014. Reelected in 2018. Reelected in 2022. Resigned to become Commissioner of the Tennessee Department of Health. | 2023–present |
| Greg Elkins (Winchester) | Republican | June 8, 2023 – present | Elected to finish Alvarado's term. Reelected in 2026. | 2023–present |
