= Steve West (Kentucky politician) =

American politician

Stephen West
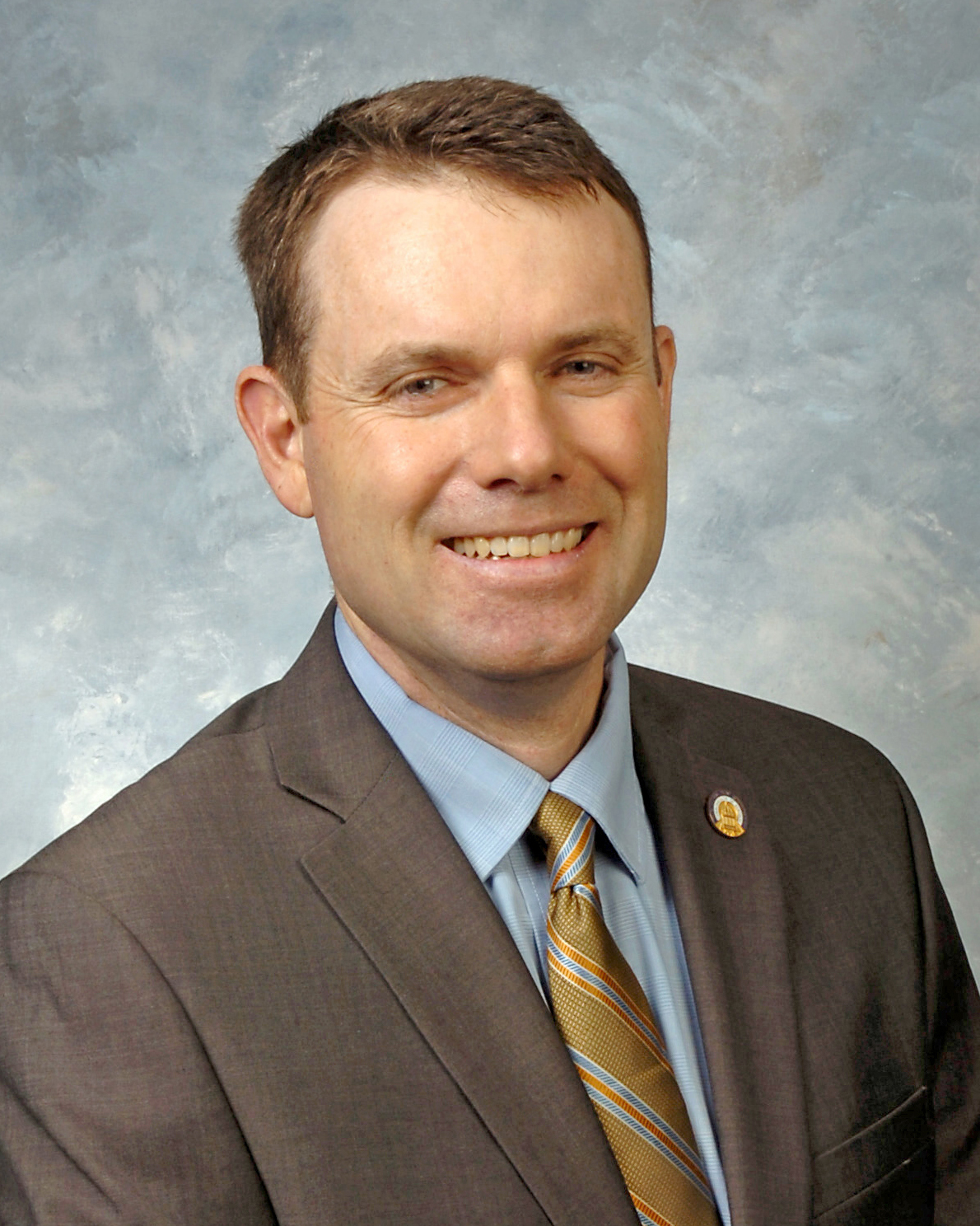
- Official portrait, 2015

Member of the Kentucky Senate from the 27th district
- Incumbent
- Assumed office March 23, 2015
- Preceded by: Walter Blevins

Personal details
- Born: Stephen West; April 28, 1970 (age 56) Paris, Kentucky, U.S.
- Party: Republican
- Spouse: Cindy
- Children: 3
- Education: Eastern Kentucky University (BA); Northern Kentucky University (JD)

Stephen Ashley West (born April 28, 1970) is an American attorney and politician serving as a member of the Kentucky Senate from the 27th district. He assumed office on March 23, 2015.

== Early life and education ==
West was born in Paris, Kentucky and attended Grant County High School. He earned a Bachelor of Arts degree in communications from Eastern Kentucky University in 1993 and a Juris Doctor from the Salmon P. Chase College of Law at Northern Kentucky University in 1996.

== Career ==
Outside of politics, West has worked as a cattle farmer, attorney, and real estate agent. He was elected to the Kentucky Senate in a March 3, 2015 special election and assumed office on March 23, 2015. During the 2015 and 2017 legislative sessions, West served as vice chair of the Senate Agriculture Committee. During the 2019–2020 legislative session, he served as vice chair of the Senate Education Committee. Since 2019, he has served as vice chair of the Senate Education Committee. West also serves as co-chair of the Senate Administrative Regulation Review Subcommittee.
