= Mary Helen, Kentucky =

Unincorporated community in Kentucky, United States

- Unincorporated community
- Location within Kentucky Location within the United States
- Coordinates: 36°48′46″N 83°15′18″W
- Country: United States
- State: Kentucky
- County: Harlan
- Elevation: 1,358 ft (414 m)
- Time zone: UTC-6 (Central (CST))
  - Summer (DST): UTC-5 (CST)
- ZIP code: 40818
- GNIS feature ID: 497642

Mary Helen (also known as Coalgood) is an unincorporated community in Harlan County, Kentucky, United States.
