= Larry Saunders =

American politician

President of the Kentucky Senate
- In office January 7, 1997 – January 4, 2000
- Preceded by: John A. Rose
- Succeeded by: David Williams

Member of the Kentucky Senate from the 37th district
- In office January 1, 1993 – January 1, 2005
- Preceded by: Dan Seum
- Succeeded by: Perry B. Clark (2006)
- In office November 14, 1986 – January 1, 1989
- Preceded by: Danny Yocom
- Succeeded by: Dan Seum

Personal details
- Born: August 1, 1939
- Died: November 21, 2010 (aged 71)
- Party: Democratic

Larry L. Saunders (August 1, 1939 – November 21, 2010) was an American politician from Kentucky who was a member of the Kentucky Senate from 1986 to 1989 and 1993 to 2005, serving as the president of the Senate from 1997 to 2000. Saunders was first elected to the senate in a November 1986 special election following the resignation of incumbent senator Danny Yocom. He was defeated for the Democratic nomination for a full term in 1998 by Dan Seum. Saunders defeated Seum in a rematch in 1992, and served until he retired from the senate in 2004.

Following the 1996 senate election, Democrats had 20 seats in the senate while Republicans had 18. In the 1997 organizational session, Saunders was elected president of the senate, defeating incumbent Democratic leader John A. Rose with the support of four democrats and all 18 Republicans. Saunders organized the senate with Republicans and his Democratic allies chosen to chair senate committees. In July and August 1999, two Democratic senators switched to the Republican party, giving them a majority in the chamber. In January 2000, Saunders was formally replaced as senate president by Republican David Williams.

He died in November 2010 at age 71.
