= Jeff Green (Kentucky politician) =

American politician

Member of the Kentucky Senate from the 1st district
- In office February 3, 1992 – September 5, 1997
- Preceded by: Greg Higdon
- Succeeded by: Bob Jackson

Personal details
- Born: June 15, 1954
- Died: September 5, 1997 (aged 43)
- Party: Democratic

Jeff Green (June 15, 1954 – September 5, 1997) was an American politician from Kentucky who was a member of the Kentucky Senate from 1992 to 1997. Green was first elected in a January 1992 special election following the resignation of incumbent senator Greg Higdon to become deputy secretary of the Kentucky Natural Resources Cabinet. Green was elected to full terms in 1992 and 1996, and died in office of a heart attack on September 5, 1997, at age 43.
