= James Crase =

American politician

Member of the Kentucky Senate from the 15th district
- In office December 1994 – January 1, 1997
- Preceded by: John D. Rogers
- Succeeded by: Vernie McGaha

Personal details
- Born: July 19, 1937
- Died: May 28, 2016 (aged 78)
- Party: Republican

James Douglas Crase (July 19, 1937 – May 28, 2016) was an American politician from Kentucky who was a member of the Kentucky Senate from 1994 to 1997. Crase was elected in a December 1994 special election after incumbent senator John D. Rogers resigned. He did not seek a full term in 1996.

He died in May 2016 at age 78.
