= Bob Jackson (Kentucky politician) =

American politician

Minority Whip of the Kentucky Senate
- In office January 7, 2003 – January 1, 2005
- Preceded by: Marshall Long
- Succeeded by: Joey Pendleton

Member of the Kentucky Senate from the 1st district
- In office November 10, 1997 – January 1, 2005
- Preceded by: Jeff Green
- Succeeded by: Kenneth W. Winters

Personal details
- Born: June 11, 1962 (age 64)
- Party: Democratic

Robert L. Jackson (born June 11, 1962) is an American politician from Kentucky who was a member of the Kentucky Senate from 1997 to 2005. Jackson was first elected in a November 1997 special election following the death of incumbent senator Jeff Green. He did not seek reelection in 2004 and was succeeded by Republican Kenneth W. Winters. Jackson was the president of Murray State University from 2018 until the end of the 2025 school year in June 2025.

== Early life ==
Jackson was born in 1962. He attended Murray State University and graduated with a Bachelor of Science degree in finance, later attending graduate level courses at Murray State and doctorate level courses at the University of Leicester in the United Kingdom. Jackson holds a Master of Arts degree in higher education administration from Antioch University and a doctorate in educational leadership from Western Kentucky University.

== Career ==
Jackson was interim president of Murray State University from August 2018 to March 2019, when he was officially appointed as the 14th president of the institution. Jackson also was Chief Executive Officer of the Murray State University Foundation, Inc. and Senior Advisor to the University regarding government relations on the state and federal level. Since his retirement on June 30, 2025, he is President Emeritus in support of the current president, Dr. Ron K. Patterson. Jackson's role with Murray State will continue as a special advisor to the Board of Regents through an unspecified future date.
