= John A. Rose =

American politician from Kentucky

John A. (Eck) Rose

President of the Kentucky Senate
- In office January 5, 1993 – January 7, 1997
- Preceded by: Paul E. Patton (as lt. governor)
- Succeeded by: Larry Saunders

President pro tempore of the Kentucky Senate
- In office January 6, 1987 – January 5, 1993
- Preceded by: Joe Prather
- Succeeded by: Charles W. Berger

Member of the Kentucky Senate from the 28th district
- In office January 1, 1978 – January 1, 1999
- Preceded by: Walter Strong
- Succeeded by: Dale Shrout

Personal details
- Born: June 1, 1940 (age 86) Clark County, Kentucky, U.S.
- Party: Democratic

John Alex "Eck" Rose (born June 1, 1940) is a former Kentucky politician, who served in the Kentucky State Senate from Winchester representing the 28th Senate District. Rose was the last President Pro Tempore of the Kentucky Senate when the office was the Senate's highest after the Lieutenant Governor of Kentucky, before a 1992 constitutional amendment removed the Lieutenant Governor as the Senate's presiding officer and created the office of President of the Kentucky Senate. In 1993 Rose became the first to hold that office, and he remained in that position until 1997.

Rose ran for Governor of Kentucky in 1995, finishing third in the five-way Democratic primary won by Paul E. Patton, who also won the general election that November. Rose's ticket won 71,740 votes to Patton's 152,203 and Secretary of State Bob Babbage's 81,352.

Rose has four daughters.
