= Christian McDaniel =

American politician (born 1977)

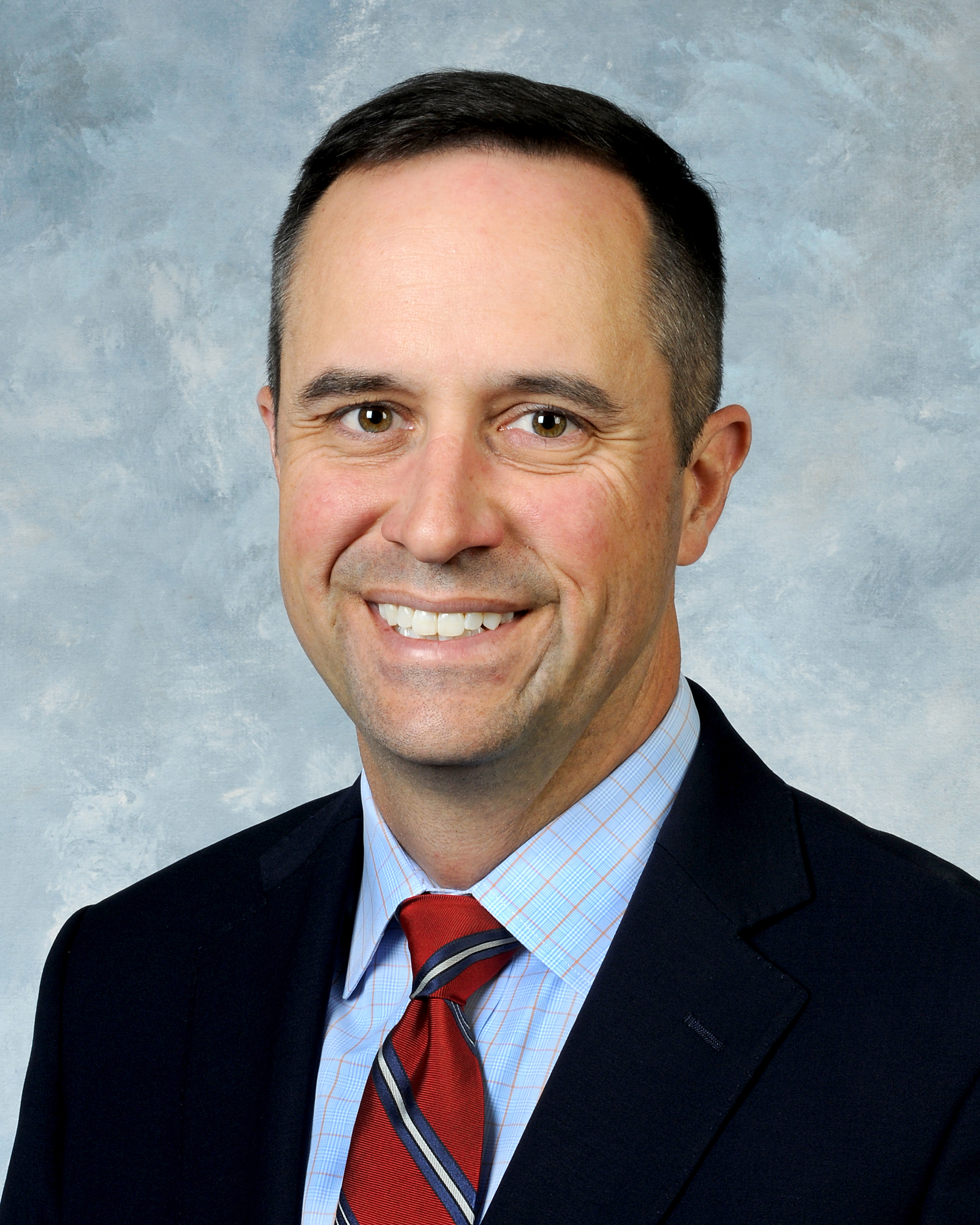
- Official portrait, 2019

Member of the Kentucky Senate from the 23rd district
- Incumbent
- Assumed office January 1, 2013
- Preceded by: Jack Westwood

Personal details
- Born: July 19, 1977 (age 49) Covington, Kentucky, U.S.
- Party: Republican
- Education: The Citadel, The Military College of South Carolina (BS); Northern Kentucky University (MBA)
- Website: chris-mcdaniel.com

Military service
- Branch/service: United States Army; Infantry
- Years of service: 1997–2001

Christian Edward McDaniel (born July 19, 1977) is an American politician and a Republican member of the Kentucky Senate, representing District 23 since January 2013.

He was the running mate of Republican gubernatorial candidate James Comer in the 2015 gubernatorial election.

== Education ==
McDaniel earned his BS from The Citadel, The Military College of South Carolina, and his MBA from Northern Kentucky University. McDaniel graduated from Covington Latin School.

== Elections ==
- 2020 McDaniel was unopposed in the Republican primary and defeated Democratic nominee Ryan Olexia with 32,188 votes (57.7%).
- 2016 McDaniel was unopposed in both the Republican primary and the general election.
- 2012 When District 23 Senator Jack Westwood retired and left the seat open, McDaniel won the May 22, 2012, Republican primary with 4,036 votes (62.1%), and won the November 6, 2012, general election with 23,993 votes (60.0%) against Democratic nominee James Noll.
