= Benny Ray Bailey =

American politician

Member of the Kentucky Senate from the 29th district
- In office January 1, 1980 – January 1, 2001
- Preceded by: Jim Hammond
- Succeeded by: Johnny Ray Turner

Personal details
- Party: Democratic

Benny Ray Bailey (born November 16, 1944) is a former Democratic member of the Kentucky Senate. He lives in Hindman, Kentucky.
