= Kenneth W. Winters =

American politician

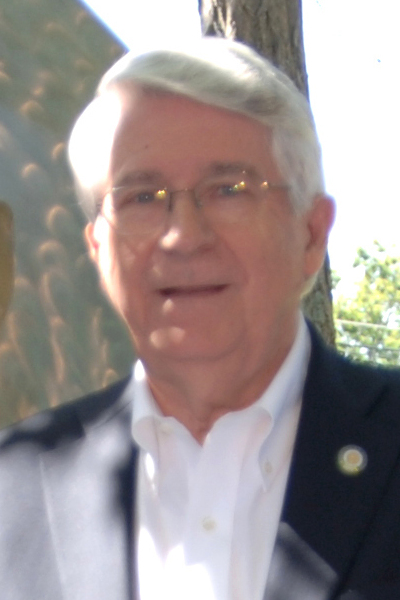
- Kenneth Winters in 2012

Member of the Kentucky Senate from the 1st district
- In office January 1, 2005 – January 1, 2013
- Preceded by: Bob Jackson
- Succeeded by: Stan Humphries

Personal details
- Born: June 27, 1934 (age 92) Crittenden County, Kentucky
- Party: Republican
- Spouse: Shirley A. Winters
- Children: Lisa
- Education: Murray State University; Indiana University; University of Northern Colorado
- Profession: Educator; former president of Campbellsville University

Kenneth Wayne Winters (born June 27, 1934) is Kentucky politician who served in the Kentucky State Senate and as president of Campbellsville University.

He graduated Crittenden County High School. He then graduated from Murray State University in 1957 with a Bachelor of Science degree in industrial arts, Indiana University in 1964 with a master of science in secondary education and University of Northern Colorado in 1970 with a doctorate in Higher Education Administration and Technology Education. He was a member of Epsilon Pi Tau honor society and Scabbard and Blade.

Winters served 12 years in the U.S. Army and the U.S. Army Reserves, and was commissioned as an officer.

Preceded by William Randolph "Randy" Davenport	President of Campbellsville University; 1988–1999	Succeeded by Michael V. Carter
