= Jack Westwood =

American politician

Member of the Kentucky Senate from the 23rd district
- In office January 1, 1997 – January 1, 2013
- Preceded by: Joseph U. Meyer
- Succeeded by: Christian McDaniel

Personal details
- Born: March 6, 1944 (age 82) Covington, Georgia
- Party: Republican
- Education: University of Kentucky (B.A.) 1966; Northern Kentucky University (M.A.) 1980

John D. Westwood (born March 6, 1944) is an American former politician, who was a Republican member of the Kentucky Senate. Westwood represented District 23 from January 1997 to January 2013. Prior to politics, he was an English and journalism teacher from 1966 to 1993. He served on the Erlanger-Elsmere School Board from 1995 to 1996. He resides in Erlanger, Kentucky.
