= Johnny Ray Turner =

American politician (born 1949)

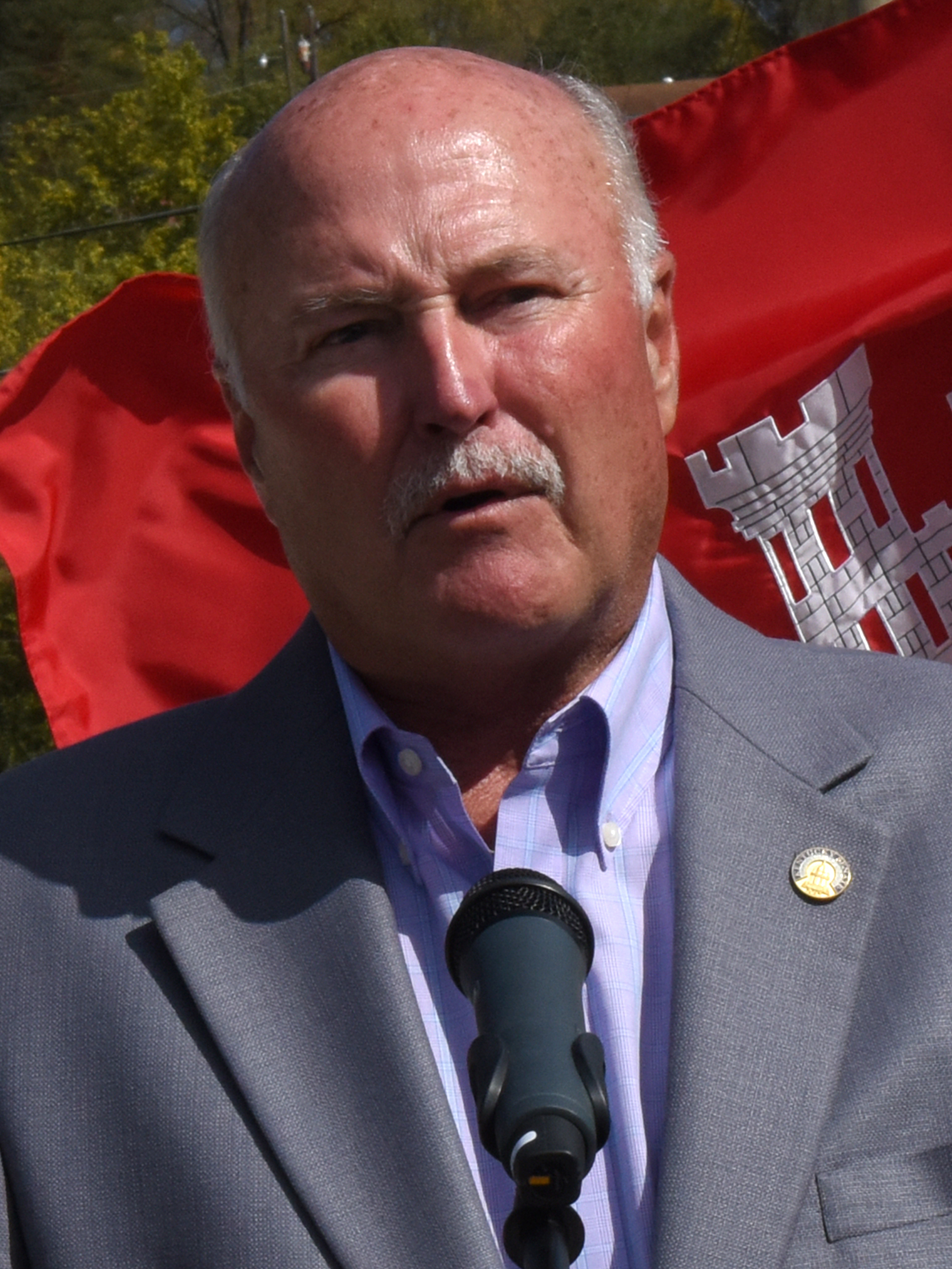
- Turner, 2019

Member of the Kentucky Senate from the 29th district
- In office January 1, 2001 – January 1, 2021
- Preceded by: Benny Ray Bailey
- Succeeded by: Johnnie Turner

Personal details
- Born: December 19, 1949 (age 76)
- Party: Democratic
- Education: Morehead State University
- Profession: Retired teacher, basketball coach, Dean of Students

Johnny Ray Turner (born December 19, 1949) is an American politician. He is a former Democratic member of the Kentucky Senate, representing the 29th District from 2001 to 2021. He served as Minority Caucus Chair from 2003 to 2014.

In April 2007, Turner was sentenced to three months' home detention and one year of probation for "non-willful" vote buying.
