= Joey Pendleton =

American politician

Minority Whip of the Kentucky Senate
- In office January 4, 2005 – January 6, 2009
- Preceded by: Bob Jackson
- Succeeded by: Jerry Rhoads

President pro tempore of the Kentucky Senate
- In office January 5, 1999 – January 4, 2000
- Preceded by: Walter Blevins
- Succeeded by: Dick Roeding

Member of the Kentucky Senate from the 3rd district
- In office January 1, 1993 – January 1, 2013
- Preceded by: Pat McCuiston
- Succeeded by: Whitney Westerfield

Personal details
- Born: May 3, 1946 (age 80) Hopkinsville, Kentucky, U.S.
- Party: Democratic
- Spouse: Diane
- Occupation: Business owner

Joseph Allen Pendleton (born May 3, 1946) is a former Democratic member of the Kentucky Senate, representing the 3rd District from 1993 through 2013. He previously served as Minority Whip. The 3rd district, according to redistricting legislation passed during the 2013 Extraordinary Session, includes Christian, Logan, and Todd counties.

Pendleton has served as chairman of the legislature's Tobacco Task Force, Pendleton was an advocate for tobacco growers and their financial interests. He also worked to promote agricultural diversity, and championed legislation to permit the agricultural and industrial development of the controversial hemp plant (which ultimately passed the Kentucky Senate in the 2013 Regular Session).

He has served on the Health & Welfare Committee. In 1998, he received the "Better Life Government Award" from the Kentucky Association of Health Care Facilities for support of legislation that created a state income tax deduction for long-term care insurance. The Brain Injury Association of Kentucky awarded Pendleton with the "S.T.A.R." Award in 1998 establishing the Traumatic Brain Injury Trust Fund. Pendleton serves as Project Manager for the Murray State University School of Agriculture. He was also named Outstanding Young Dairyman for the Southeastern United States in 1977 and received the 4-H Alumni Award in 1989. In 1996, he received the Distinguished Service Award from the Kentucky Association of Conversation Districts. Prior to his tenure in the Senate, Pendleton also served three years as a magistrate on the County Fiscal court in the county where he lives, Christian County Kentucky.
