= 2016 Kentucky elections =

A general election was held in the U.S. state of Kentucky on November 8, 2016. The primary election for all offices was held on May 17, 2016.

== Federal offices ==
=== United States Senate ===
Incumbent senator Rand Paul won reelection, defeating Democratic challenger Jim Gray.

=== United States House of Representatives ===
Kentucky has six congressional districts, electing five Republicans and one Democrat.

== State offices ==
=== Kentucky Senate ===
The Kentucky Senate consists of 38 members. In 2016, half of the chamber (all odd-numbered districts) was up for election. Republicans maintained their majority, without gaining or losing any seats.

=== Kentucky House of Representatives ===
All 100 seats in the Kentucky House of Representatives were up for election in 2016. Republicans gained control of the chamber from Democrats, picking up 17 seats.

=== Kentucky Supreme Court ===
2016 Kentucky Supreme Court 5th district election
- November 8, 2016
- District 5
Candidate	Laurance B. VanMeter	Glenn Acree
Popular vote	178,720	62,624
Percentage	74.05%	25.95%
- County results VanMeter: 70–80% 80–90%
Justice before election
Mary C. Noble
Elected Justice
Laurance B. VanMeter

The Kentucky Supreme Court consists of 7 justices elected in non-partisan elections to staggered eight-year terms. District 5 was up for election in 2016.

==== District 5 ====
2016 Kentucky Supreme Court 5th district election
Candidate	Votes	%
Larry VanMeter	178,720	74.05
Glenn Acree	62,624	25.95
Total votes	241,344	100.0

== Local offices ==
=== Mayors ===
Mayors in Kentucky are elected to four-year terms, with cities holding their elections in either presidential or midterm years.

=== City councils ===
Each incorporated city elected its council members to a two-year term.

=== School boards ===
Local school board members are elected to staggered four-year terms, with half up for election in 2016.

=== Louisville Metro Council ===
The Louisville Metro Council is elected to staggered four-year terms, with even-numbered districts up for election in 2016.

== See also ==
- Elections in Kentucky
- Politics of Kentucky
- Political party strength in Kentucky
