= Walter Blevins =

American politician

Judge/Executive of Rowan County
- In office January 5, 2015 – December 31, 2018
- Preceded by: Jim Nickell
- Succeeded by: Harry Clark

Majority Whip of the Kentucky Senate
- In office January 5, 1999 – August 22, 1999
- Preceded by: Fred Bradley
- Succeeded by: Elizabeth Tori

President pro tempore of the Kentucky Senate
- In office January 7, 1997 – January 5, 1999
- Preceded by: Charles W. Berger
- Succeeded by: Joey Pendleton

Member of the Kentucky Senate from the 27th district
- In office January 9, 1992 – January 4, 2015
- Preceded by: Woody May
- Succeeded by: Steve West

Member of the Kentucky House of Representatives from the 71st district
- In office January 1, 1982 – January 9, 1992
- Preceded by: Woody May
- Succeeded by: Jerry Ravenscraft

Personal details
- Born: March 29, 1950 (age 76) Paintsville, Kentucky, U.S.
- Party: Democratic
- Education: Morehead State University (BS); University of Kentucky (DDM)

Walter "Doc" Blevins Jr. (born March 29, 1950) is an American politician from Kentucky who was the Judge/Executive of Rowan County, a member of the Kentucky Senate, and a member of the Kentucky House of Representatives. Blevins was first elected to the house in 1981, defeating incumbent Democratic representative Woody May for renomination. Blevins was elected to the senate in a January 1992 special election following the resignation of May, who had been elected to the senate in 1983.

Blevins was elected Judge/Executive in 2014 following the retirement of incumbent Jim Nickell. He resigned his seat in the senate and was succeeded by Republican Steve West. He did not seek reelection in 2018.
