= President of the Kentucky Senate =

- Seal of the Commonwealth of Kentucky

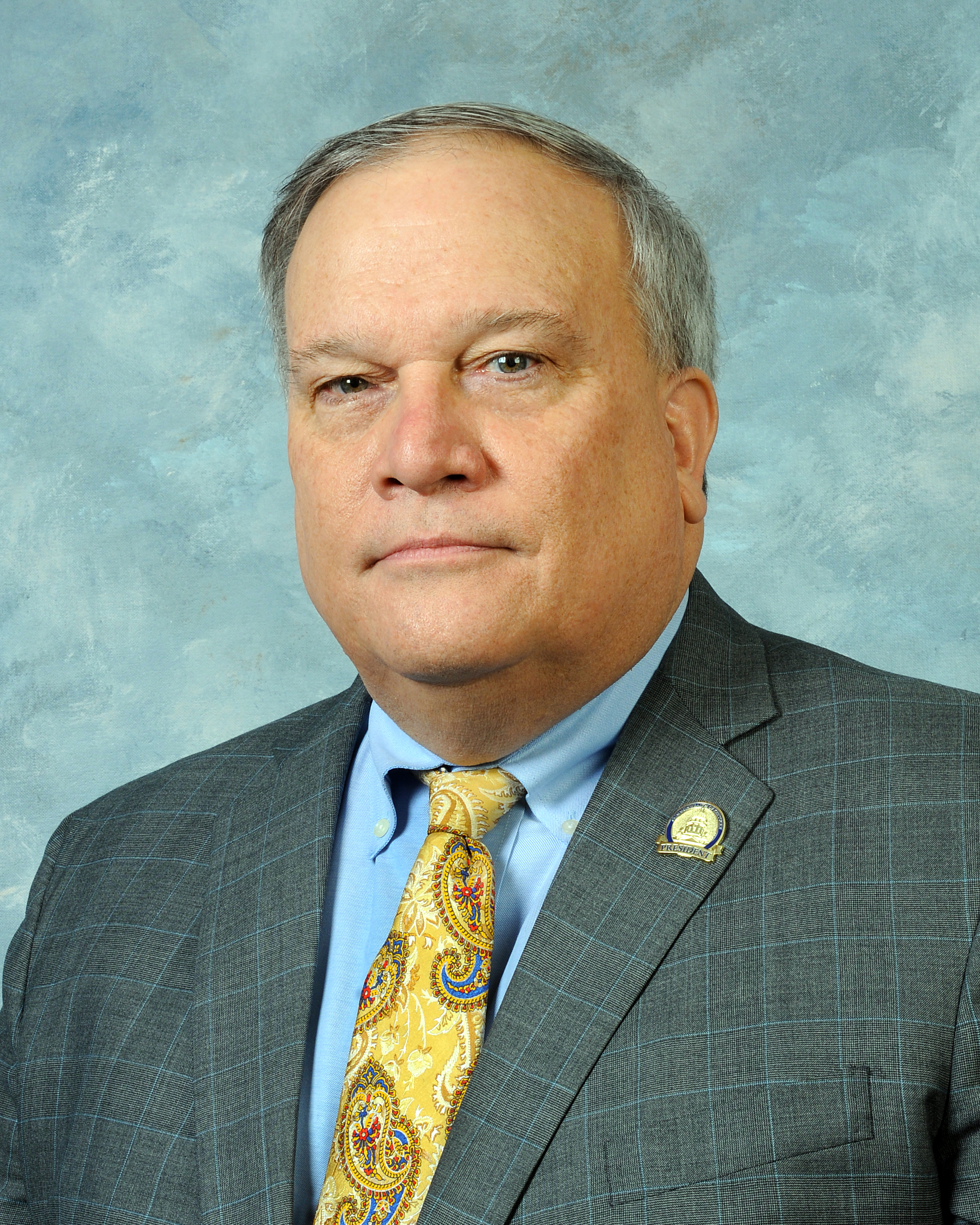
- Incumbent; Robert Stivers since January 8, 2013
- Status: Presiding officer
- Seat: Kentucky State Capitol, Frankfort
- Appointer: Kentucky Senate
- Term length: 4 years
- Inaugural holder: Alexander Scott Bullitt (as speaker of the senate)

President of the Kentucky Senate is an office created by a 1992 amendment to the Constitution of Kentucky. The president of the Senate is the highest-ranking officer of that body and presides over the Senate.

== History of the office ==
Prior to a 1992 amendment to Section 83 of the Constitution of Kentucky, the lieutenant governor of Kentucky was the Senate's presiding officer. In reality, the lieutenant governor was rarely present to preside over the chamber. The president pro tempore of the Kentucky Senate – often called the president pro tem for short – acted as the de facto presiding officer. The president pro tem usually presided over the body and was the most influential member of that body.

After the 1992 amendment passed and altered Section 83 of the constitution, the lieutenant governor was stripped of all duties relating to the Senate. A new office, president of the Kentucky Senate, was created (Sections 84, 85, 86 and 87 of the constitution) and given power to preside over the Senate.

The president pro tem was almost always chosen by the majority party from among their members, then elected on a party line vote. The president of the Senate is usually chosen in the same manner. In the mid-1990s a small dissident group of Democrats joined with Republicans to elect the body's officers. John "Eck" Rose, who had served a total of ten years as President of the Senate and as President Pro Tem when that office was still the highest in the chamber, was then deposed as President of the Senate and replaced by Larry Saunders, a Democrat who aligned with the Republican minority and a handful of dissident Democrats. As a result of this arrangement, Republicans were installed as committee chairs. This arrangement ended when Republicans won a majority in the Senate.

== Duties of the office ==
The president of the Senate acts as presiding officer of the Senate. The president of the Senate is also a member of the Legislative Research Commission. The president of the Senate has a position on the most influential Senate committees and exerts considerable influence in determining the membership of Senate committees and the assignment to senators of office space in the Capitol Annex building.

== Presidents of the Kentucky Senate ==
Speaker of the Senate (1792–1800)
#	Image	Name	Term start	Term end	Party
1		Alexander Scott Bullitt	1792	1800	Democratic-Republican

Modern Presidents of the Kentucky Senate (1993–present)
#	Image	Name	Term start	Term end	Party
52		John A. Rose	January 5, 1993	January 7, 1997	Democratic
53		Larry Saunders	January 7, 1997	January 4, 2000	Democratic
54		David L. Williams	January 4, 2000	November 2, 2012	Republican
55		Robert Stivers	January 8, 2013	Incumbent	Republican

== See also ==
- Kentucky General Assembly
- Kentucky Senate
- President pro tempore of the Kentucky Senate
- Lieutenant Governor of Kentucky
- President of the Senate
- List of Kentucky General Assemblies
