= 2023 Kentucky Secretary of State election =

- November 7, 2023
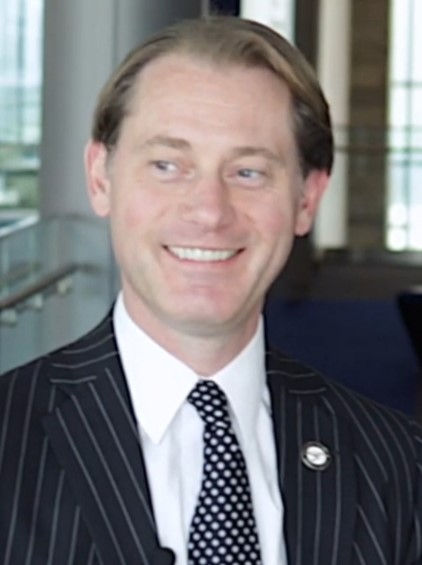

Nominee	Michael Adams	Buddy Wheatley
Party	Republican	Democratic
Popular vote	785,237	510,090
Percentage	60.60%	39.36%
- Adams: 50–60% 60–70% 70–80% 80–90% Wheatley: 50–60% 60–70% 70–80% 80–90%
Secretary of State before election
Michael Adams
Republican
Elected Secretary of State
Michael Adams
Republican

The 2023 Kentucky Secretary of State election took place on November 7, 2023, to elect the Secretary of State of Kentucky. Incumbent secretary of state Michael Adams won re-election to a second term after he defeated Democratic nominee Buddy Wheatley. Primaries were held on May 16, 2023.

== Republican primary ==
=== Candidates ===
==== Nominee ====
- Michael Adams, incumbent secretary of state

==== Eliminated in primary ====
- Stephen Knipper, former Erlanger city councilor, nominee for Secretary of State in 2015 and candidate in 2019
- Allen Maricle, former state representative (1994–1998)

=== Results ===
County results Adams: 40–50%; 50–60%; 60–70%; 70–80%; Knipper: 40–50%; 50–60%

Congressional district results Adams: 50–60%; 60–70%; 70–80%

Republican primary results
Party	Candidate	Votes	%
Republican	Michael Adams	171,288	63.9
Republican	Stephen Knipper	70,993	26.5
Republican	Allen Maricle	25,772	9.6
Total votes		268,053	100

== Democratic primary ==
=== Candidates ===
==== Nominee ====
- Buddy Wheatley, former state representative (2019–2023)

==== Declined ====
- Neville Blakemore, construction executive and candidate for state treasurer in 2015

==== Endorsements ====
Buddy Wheatley

Organizations

- United Mine Workers of America
- Kentucky State AFL-CIO

== General election ==
=== Predictions ===
Source	Ranking	As of
Sabato's Crystal Ball	Likely R	June 21, 2023

=== Polling ===
Poll source	Date(s) administered	Sample size (Note: Key: A – all adults RV – registered voters LV – likely voters V – unclear)	Margin of error	Michael Adams (R)	Buddy Wheatley (D)	Undecided
Public Opinion Strategies (R) (Note: Poll commissioned by the Republican State Leadership Committee)	July 19–20, 2023	500 (LV)	± 4.4%	48%	24%	26%

=== Debates ===
2023 Kentucky Secretary of State debate
No.	Date	Host	Link	Republican	Democratic
P Participant A Absent I Invitee					
P Participant A Absent I Invitee				Michael Adams	Buddy Wheatley
1	October 19, 2023	WLKY	YouTube	P	P

=== Results ===
2023 Kentucky Secretary of State election
Party	Candidate	Votes	%	±%
Republican	Michael Adams (incumbent)	785,237	60.60%	+8.34%
Democratic	Buddy Wheatley	510,090	39.36%	−8.38%
Write-in		518	0.04%	
Total votes		1,295,845	100.00%	

==== By congressional district ====
Adams won five of six congressional districts.

District	Adams	Wheatley	Representative
1st	69%	31%	James Comer
2nd	66%	34%	Brett Guthrie
3rd	41%	59%	Morgan McGarvey
4th	63%	37%	Thomas Massie
5th	73%	27%	Hal Rogers
6th	57%	43%	Andy Barr
