= Kentucky's 4th Senate district =

American legislative district

Kentucky's 4th State Senate district
Senator
Robby Mills; R–Henderson
since January 1, 2019
- Registration: 49.4% Democratic; 41.7% Republican; 8.4% No party preference
- Demographics: 86.3% White; 6.4% Black; 3.1% Hispanic; 0.3% Asian; 0.2% Native American; 0.1% Hawaiian/Pacific Islander; 3.6% Multiracial
- Population (2023): 115,888
- Registered voters (2025): 88,529

Kentucky's 4th Senatorial district is one of 38 districts in the Kentucky Senate. Located in western Kentucky, it comprises the counties of Henderson, Hopkins, Union, and Webster. It has been represented by Robby Mills (R–Henderson) since 2019. As of 2023, the district had a population of 115,888.

From 1942 to 1945, the district was represented by Earle Clements, who would later be elected governor and U.S. senator from Kentucky. From 1894 to 1897, the district was represented by William J. Deboe, who was elected U.S. senator from Kentucky in 1897.

== Voter registration ==
On January 1, 2025, the district had 88,529 registered voters, who were registered with the following parties.

Party	Registration	
Party	Voters	%
Democratic	43,765	49.44
Republican	36,884	41.66
Independent	3,054	3.45
Libertarian	336	0.38
Constitution	53	0.06
Green	44	0.05
Socialist Workers	9	0.01
Reform	6	0.01
"Other"	4,378	4.95
Total	88,529	100.00
Source: Kentucky State Board of Elections

== Election results from statewide races ==
=== 2002 – 2012 ===
Year	Office	Results (Note: Figures presented in this table are calculated by summing precinct election results published by the Kentucky State Board of Elections, using precinct data that list each precinct's senatorial district.)
2002	Senator	McConnell 62.0 - 38.0%
2002	Amendment 1	Yes 77.3 - 22.7%
2002	Amendment 2	Yes 64.4 - 35.6%
2003	Governor	Chandler 51.6 - 48.4%
2003	Secretary of State	Maple 60.2 - 39.8%
2003	Attorney General	Stumbo 61.5 - 35.3%
2003	Auditor of Public Accounts	Luallen 57.9 - 42.1%
2003	State Treasurer	Miller 64.0 - 36.0%
2003	Commissioner of Agriculture	Baesler 52.9 - 47.1%
2004	President	Bush 58.7 - 40.7%
2004	Senator	Mongiardo 51.7 - 48.3%
2004	Amendment 1	Yes 82.4 - 17.6%
2007	Governor	Beshear 66.1 - 33.9%
2007	Secretary of State	Hendrickson 56.3 - 43.7%
2007	Attorney General	Conway 73.0 - 27.0%
2007	Auditor of Public Accounts	Luallen 65.7 - 34.3%
2007	State Treasurer	Hollenbach 64.4 - 35.6%
2007	Commissioner of Agriculture	Farmer 52.8 - 47.2%
2008	President	McCain 54.2 - 44.0%
2008	Senator	Lunsford 52.4 - 47.6%
2010	Senator	Paul 52.2 - 47.8%
2011	Governor	Beshear 64.5 - 31.4%
2011	Secretary of State	Grimes 63.1 - 36.9%
2011	Attorney General	Conway 54.5 - 45.5%
2011	Auditor of Public Accounts	Edelen 57.6 - 42.4%
2011	State Treasurer	Hollenbach 58.3 - 38.5%
2011	Commissioner of Agriculture	Comer 59.7 - 40.3%
2012	President	Romney 62.5 - 36.0%
2012	Amendment 1	Yes 88.3 - 11.7%

=== 2014 – 2020 ===
Year	Office	Results
2014	Senator	McConnell 58.2 - 38.7%
2015	Governor	Bevin 52.4 - 44.9%
2015	Secretary of State	Grimes 52.9 - 47.1%
2015	Attorney General	Beshear 53.9 - 46.1%
2015	Auditor of Public Accounts	Harmon 52.4 - 47.6%
2015	State Treasurer	Ball 56.8 - 43.2%
2015	Commissioner of Agriculture	Quarles 58.1 - 41.9%
2016	President	Trump 70.3 - 26.0%
2016	Senator	Paul 61.1 - 38.9%
2019	Governor	Bevin 55.5 - 42.6%
2019	Secretary of State	Adams 59.4 - 40.6%
2019	Attorney General	Cameron 62.5 - 37.5%
2019	Auditor of Public Accounts	Harmon 60.2 - 36.8%
2019	State Treasurer	Ball 64.1 - 35.9%
2019	Commissioner of Agriculture	Quarles 62.3 - 35.4%
2020	President	Trump 70.6 - 28.0%
2020	Senator	McConnell 63.9 - 31.3%
2020	Amendment 1	Yes 59.9 - 40.1%
2020	Amendment 2	No 68.4 - 31.6%

=== 2022 – present ===
Year	Office	Results
2022	Senator	Paul 69.2 - 30.8%
2022	Amendment 1	Yes 51.9 - 48.1%
2022	Amendment 2	Yes 53.6 - 46.4%
2023	Governor	Cameron 51.0 - 49.0%
2023	Secretary of State	Adams 63.3 - 36.7%
2023	Attorney General	Coleman 63.1 - 36.9%
2023	Auditor of Public Accounts	Ball 63.2 - 36.8%
2023	State Treasurer	Metcalf 62.3 - 37.7%
2023	Commissioner of Agriculture	Shell 64.7 - 35.3%
2024	President	Trump 71.5 - 27.3%
2024	Amendment 1	Yes 64.4 - 35.6%
2024	Amendment 2	No 65.5 - 34.5%

== List of members representing the district ==
Member	Party	Years	Electoral history	District location
William Sullivan (Henderson)	Democratic	January 1, 1966 – January 1, 1982	Elected in 1965. Reelected in 1969. Reelected in 1973. Reelected in 1977. Retired.	1964–1972
William Sullivan (Henderson)	Democratic	January 1, 1966 – January 1, 1982	Elected in 1965. Reelected in 1969. Reelected in 1973. Reelected in 1977. Retired.	1972–1974
William Sullivan (Henderson)	Democratic	January 1, 1966 – January 1, 1982	Elected in 1965. Reelected in 1969. Reelected in 1973. Reelected in 1977. Retired.	1974–1984
Henry G. Lackey (Henderson)	Democratic	January 1, 1982 – January 1, 1987	Elected in 1981. Lost renomination.	1974–1984
Henry G. Lackey (Henderson)	Democratic	January 1, 1982 – January 1, 1987	Elected in 1981. Lost renomination.	1984–1993; Crittenden, Henderson, Livingston, Lyon, Union, and Webster Counties.
John Hall (Henderson)	Democratic	January 1, 1987 – January 1, 1991	Elected in 1986. Lost renomination.	1984–1993; Crittenden, Henderson, Livingston, Lyon, Union, and Webster Counties.
Henry G. Lackey (Henderson)	Democratic	January 1, 1991 – January 1, 1995	Elected in 1990. Retired to run for Kentucky's; 1st congressional district.	1984–1993; Crittenden, Henderson, Livingston, Lyon, Union, and Webster Counties.
Henry G. Lackey (Henderson)	Democratic	January 1, 1991 – January 1, 1995	Elected in 1990. Retired to run for Kentucky's; 1st congressional district.	1993–1997
Paul Herron (Henderson)	Democratic	January 1, 1995 – June 16, 2004	Elected in 1994. Reelected in 1998. Reelected in 2002. Died.	1993–1997
Paul Herron (Henderson)	Democratic	January 1, 1995 – June 16, 2004	Elected in 1994. Reelected in 1998. Reelected in 2002. Died.	1997–2003
Paul Herron (Henderson)	Democratic	January 1, 1995 – June 16, 2004	Elected in 1994. Reelected in 1998. Reelected in 2002. Died.	2003–2015
Dorsey Ridley (Henderson)	Democratic	July 2004 – January 1, 2019	Elected to finish Herron's term. Reelected in 2006. Reelected in 2010. Reelected in 2014. Lost reelection.	2003–2015
Dorsey Ridley (Henderson)	Democratic	July 2004 – January 1, 2019	Elected to finish Herron's term. Reelected in 2006. Reelected in 2010. Reelected in 2014. Lost reelection.	2015–2023
Robby Mills (Henderson)	Republican	January 1, 2019 – present	Elected in 2018. Reelected in 2022. Reelected in 2026.	2015–2023
Robby Mills (Henderson)	Republican	January 1, 2019 – present	Elected in 2018. Reelected in 2022. Reelected in 2026.	2023–present
