= Kentucky's 1st Senate district =

American legislative district

Kentucky's 1st State Senate district
Senator
Jason Howell; R–Murray
since January 1, 2021
- Registration: 47.0% Republican; 43.1% Democratic; 9.3% No party preference
- Demographics: 86.0% White; 5.5% Black; 4.3% Hispanic; 0.8% Asian; 0.2% Native American; 0.2% Hawaiian/Pacific Islander; 0.3% Other; 2.9% Multiracial
- Population (2023): 117,418
- Registered voters (2025): 91,032

Kentucky's 1st Senatorial district is one of 38 districts in the Kentucky Senate. Located in the far west of the state, it comprises the counties of Calloway, Crittenden, Fulton, Graves, Hickman, Lyon, and Trigg. It has been represented by Jason Howell (R–Murray) since 2021. As of 2023, the district had a population of 117,418.

From 1932 to 1936, the district was represented by Robert Humphreys, who would later be appointed U.S. senator from Kentucky.

== Voter registration ==
On January 1, 2025, the district had 91,032 registered voters, who were registered with the following parties.

Party	Registration	
Party	Voters	%
Republican	42,828	47.05
Democratic	39,192	43.05
Independent	3,522	3.87
Libertarian	400	0.44
Green	56	0.06
Constitution	50	0.05
Socialist Workers	10	0.01
Reform	4	0.00
"Other"	4,970	5.46
Total	91,032	100.00
Source: Kentucky State Board of Elections

== Election results from statewide races ==
=== 2002 – 2012 ===
Year	Office	Results (Note: Figures presented in this table are calculated by summing precinct election results published by the Kentucky State Board of Elections, using precinct data that list each precinct's senatorial district.)
2002	Senator	McConnell 64.8 - 35.2%
2002	Amendment 1	Yes 70.8 - 29.2%
2002	Amendment 2	Yes 62.7 - 37.3%
2003	Governor	Fletcher 52.2 - 47.8%
2003	Secretary of State	Maple 53.4 - 46.6%
2003	Attorney General	Stumbo 56.8 - 39.9%
2003	Auditor of Public Accounts	Luallen 55.6 - 44.4%
2003	State Treasurer	Miller 60.0 - 40.0%
2003	Commissioner of Agriculture	Farmer 51.3 - 48.7%
2004	President	Bush 60.6 - 38.6%
2004	Senator	Mongiardo 50.04 - 49.96%
2004	Amendment 1	Yes 85.7 - 14.3%
2007	Governor	Beshear 59.2 - 40.8%
2007	Secretary of State	Grayson 51.4 - 48.6%
2007	Attorney General	Conway 66.0 - 34.0%
2007	Auditor of Public Accounts	Luallen 62.3 - 37.7%
2007	State Treasurer	Hollenbach 61.9 - 38.1%
2007	Commissioner of Agriculture	Farmer 56.9 - 43.1%
2008	President	McCain 60.6 - 37.8%
2008	Senator	McConnell 53.3 - 46.7%
2010	Senator	Paul 57.1 - 42.9%
2011	Governor	Beshear 55.1 - 40.0%
2011	Secretary of State	Grimes 58.4 - 41.6%
2011	Attorney General	P'Pool 51.8 - 48.2%
2011	Auditor of Public Accounts	Edelen 50.2 - 49.8%
2011	State Treasurer	Hollenbach 49.7 - 47.2%
2011	Commissioner of Agriculture	Comer 64.8 - 35.2%
2012	President	Romney 65.6 - 32.7%
2012	Amendment 1	Yes 89.1 - 10.9%

=== 2014 – 2020 ===
Year	Office	Results
2014	Senator	McConnell 60.8 - 35.9%
2015	Governor	Bevin 57.1 - 40.0%
2015	Secretary of State	Knipper 53.1 - 46.9%
2015	Attorney General	Westerfield 54.4 - 45.6%
2015	Auditor of Public Accounts	Harmon 56.5 - 43.5%
2015	State Treasurer	Ball 62.2 - 37.8%
2015	Commissioner of Agriculture	Quarles 65.6 - 34.4%
2016	President	Trump 70.9 - 24.9%
2016	Senator	Paul 64.8 - 35.2%
2019	Governor	Bevin 60.1 - 37.8%
2019	Secretary of State	Adams 65.0 - 35.0%
2019	Attorney General	Cameron 65.2 - 34.8%
2019	Auditor of Public Accounts	Harmon 64.1 - 32.9%
2019	State Treasurer	Ball 69.4 - 30.6%
2019	Commissioner of Agriculture	Quarles 66.9 - 29.9%
2020	President	Trump 71.9 - 26.6%
2020	Senator	McConnell 67.0 - 29.0%
2020	Amendment 1	Yes 62.5 - 37.5%
2020	Amendment 2	No 67.5 - 32.5%

=== 2022 – present ===
Year	Office	Results
2022	Senator	Paul 74.1 - 25.9%
2022	Amendment 1	Yes 55.0 - 45.0%
2022	Amendment 2	Yes 60.9 - 39.1%
2023	Governor	Cameron 59.7 - 40.3%
2023	Secretary of State	Adams 71.7 - 28.3%
2023	Attorney General	Coleman 69.6 - 30.4%
2023	Auditor of Public Accounts	Ball 72.0 - 28.0%
2023	State Treasurer	Metcalf 68.2 - 31.8%
2023	Commissioner of Agriculture	Shell 71.8 - 28.2%
2024	President	Trump 75.2 - 23.4%
2024	Amendment 1	Yes 66.0 - 34.0%
2024	Amendment 2	No 66.2 - 33.8%

== List of members representing the district ==
Member	Party	Years	Electoral history	District location
Carroll Hubbard (Mayfield)	Democratic	January 1, 1968 – January 3, 1975	Elected in 1967. Reelected in 1971. Resigned after being elected to Kentucky's 1st congressional district.	1964–1972
Carroll Hubbard (Mayfield)	Democratic	January 1, 1968 – January 3, 1975	Elected in 1967. Reelected in 1971. Resigned after being elected to Kentucky's 1st congressional district.	1972–1974
Carroll Hubbard (Mayfield)	Democratic	January 1, 1968 – January 3, 1975	Elected in 1967. Reelected in 1971. Resigned after being elected to Kentucky's 1st congressional district.	1974–1984
Richard Weisenberger (Mayfield)	Democratic	January 1, 1976 – September 30, 1981	Elected in 1975. Reelected in 1979. Resigned to run for Commonwealth's Attorney.	1974–1984
Greg Higdon (Fancy Farm)	Democratic	November 1981 – December 23, 1991	Elected to finish Weisenberger's term. Reelected in 1983. Reelected in 1988. Resigned to join the cabinet of Brereton C. Jones.	1974–1984
Greg Higdon (Fancy Farm)	Democratic	November 1981 – December 23, 1991	Elected to finish Weisenberger's term. Reelected in 1983. Reelected in 1988. Resigned to join the cabinet of Brereton C. Jones.	1984–1993; Calloway, Carlisle, Fulton, Graves, Hickman, and Trigg Counties.
Jeff Green (Mayfield)	Democratic	February 3, 1992 – September 5, 1997	Elected to finish Higdon's term. Reelected in 1992. Reelected in 1996. Died.	1984–1993; Calloway, Carlisle, Fulton, Graves, Hickman, and Trigg Counties.
Jeff Green (Mayfield)	Democratic	February 3, 1992 – September 5, 1997	Elected to finish Higdon's term. Reelected in 1992. Reelected in 1996. Died.	1993–1995
Jeff Green (Mayfield)	Democratic	February 3, 1992 – September 5, 1997	Elected to finish Higdon's term. Reelected in 1992. Reelected in 1996. Died.	1995–1997
Jeff Green (Mayfield)	Democratic	February 3, 1992 – September 5, 1997	Elected to finish Higdon's term. Reelected in 1992. Reelected in 1996. Died.	1997–2003
Bob Jackson (Murray)	Democratic	November 10, 1997 – January 1, 2005	Elected to finish Green's term. Reelected in 2000. Retired.	1997–2003
Bob Jackson (Murray)	Democratic	November 10, 1997 – January 1, 2005	Elected to finish Green's term. Reelected in 2000. Retired.	2003–2015
Kenneth W. Winters (Murray)	Republican	January 1, 2005 – January 1, 2013	Elected in 2004. Reelected in 2008. Retired.	2003–2015
Stanley H. Humphries (Cadiz)	Republican	January 1, 2013 – January 1, 2021	Elected in 2012. Reelected in 2016. Retired.	2003–2015
Stanley H. Humphries (Cadiz)	Republican	January 1, 2013 – January 1, 2021	Elected in 2012. Reelected in 2016. Retired.	2015–2023
Jason Howell (Murray)	Republican	January 1, 2021 – present	Elected in 2020. Reelected in 2024.	2015–2023
Jason Howell (Murray)	Republican	January 1, 2021 – present	Elected in 2020. Reelected in 2024.	2023–present
