= 2007 Kentucky elections =

The 2007 Kentucky elections for the statewide offices of governor, lieutenant governor, attorney general, auditor of public accounts, commissioner of agriculture, secretary of state, and state treasurer were held on November 6, 2007. All incumbents were reelected with the exception of incumbent governor Ernie Fletcher, who was defeated in his reelection bid for governor by former Lieutenant Governor Steve Beshear. In addition, Democrats held the open Attorney General and State Treasurer posts.

This election was historically significant in that it marked the first time since 1915 that a Republican had won statewide office in an election won by a Democratic gubernatorial candidate. Incumbent Republicans Trey Grayson and Richie Farmer won reelection as Secretary of State and Commissioner of Agriculture respectively.

== Governor and lieutenant governor ==
Incumbent Republican Ernie Fletcher and his running mate, Robbie Rudolph, faced off against the Democratic slate of former Lt. Governor Steve Beshear and State Senator Dan Mongiardo.

== Secretary of State ==
2007 Kentucky Secretary of State election
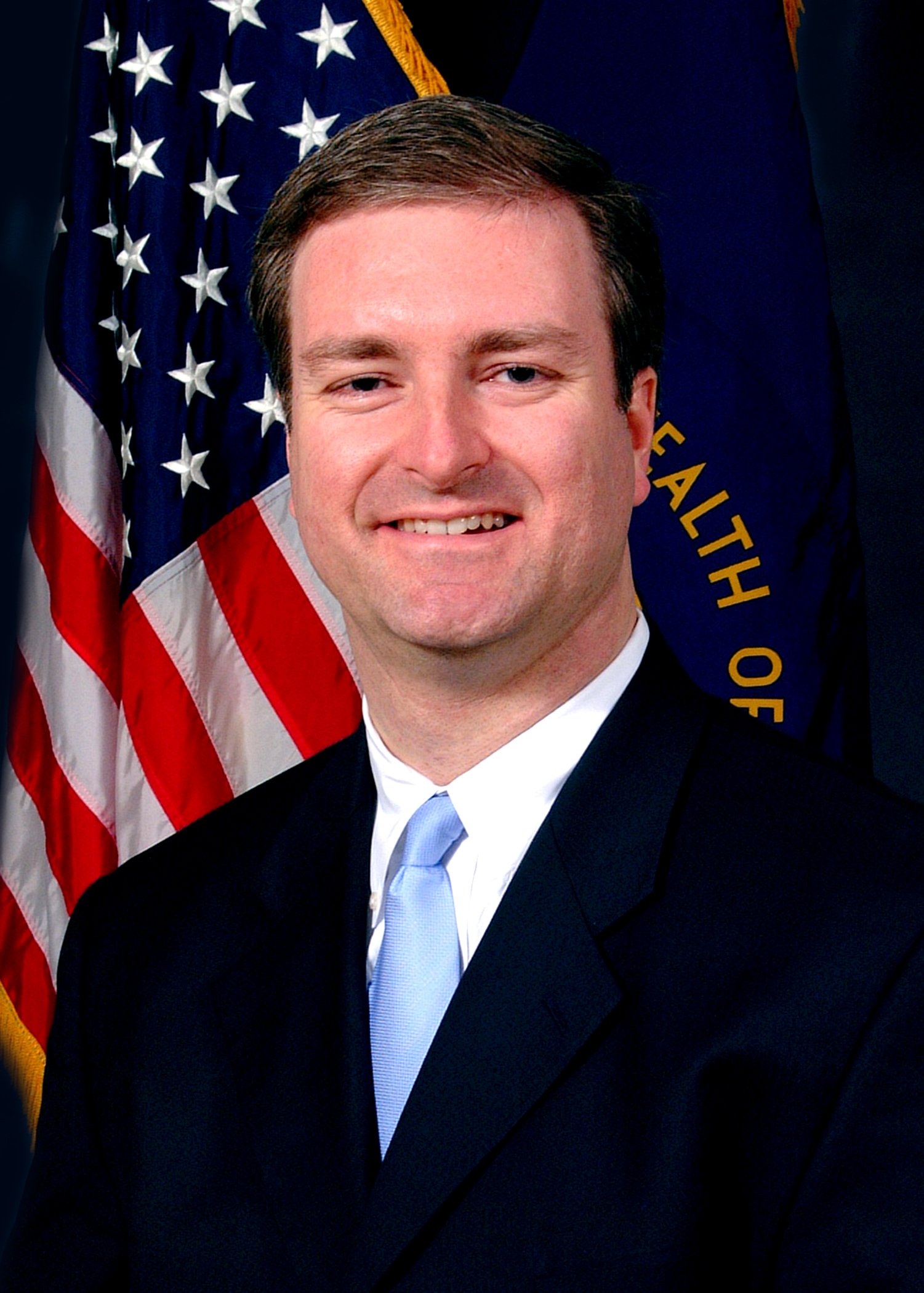

Nominee	Trey Grayson	Bruce Hendrickson
Party	Republican	Democratic
Popular vote	576,881	434,269
Percentage	57.1%	42.9%
- County results Grayson: 50–60% 60–70% 70–80% 80–90% Hendrickson: 50–60% 60–70% 70–80% 80–90%
Secretary of State before election
Trey Grayson
Republican
Elected Secretary of State
Trey Grayson
Republican

Incumbent Republican Trey Grayson was elected in 2003 with 52.5% of the vote. He was challenged by the former Mayor of Pineville, Democrat Bruce Hendrickson. Grayson held a narrow 45–39 lead over Hendrickson in a Research 2000 poll conducted in October.

=== Results ===
2007 Kentucky Secretary of State election
Party	Candidate	Votes	%	±%
Republican	Trey Grayson (incumbent)	576,881	57.1	+4.6
Democratic	Bruce Hendrickson	434,269	42.9	−4.6

== Attorney General ==
2007 Kentucky Attorney General election
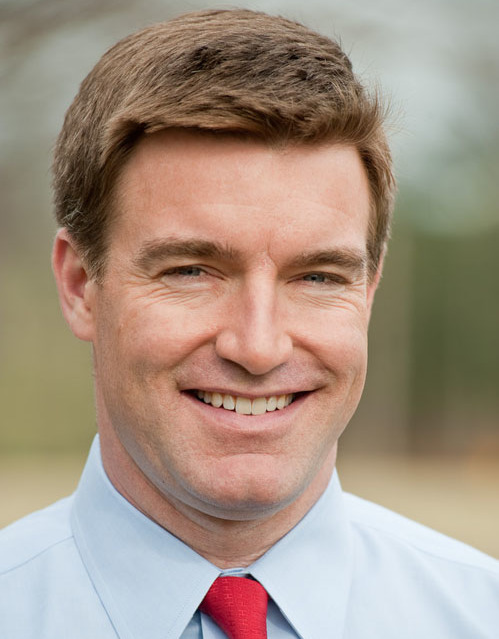

Nominee	Jack Conway	Stan Lee
Party	Democratic	Republican
Popular vote	612,689	399,603
Percentage	60.5%	39.5%
- County results Conway: 50–60% 60–70% 70–80% 80-90% Lee: 50–60% 60–70% 70–80%
Attorney General before election
Greg Stumbo
Democratic
Elected Attorney General
Jack Conway
Democratic

The seat left open by Democrat Greg Stumbo, who made a failed bid for Lt. Governor, was contested by Democrat Jack Conway and Republican State Representative Stan Lee.

=== Results ===
2007 Kentucky Attorney General election
Party	Candidate	Votes	%	±%
Democratic	Jack Conway	612,689	60.5	+12.8
Republican	Stan Lee	399,603	39.5	−2.2

== Auditor of Public Accounts ==
2007 Kentucky Auditor of Public Accounts election
- November 6, 2007
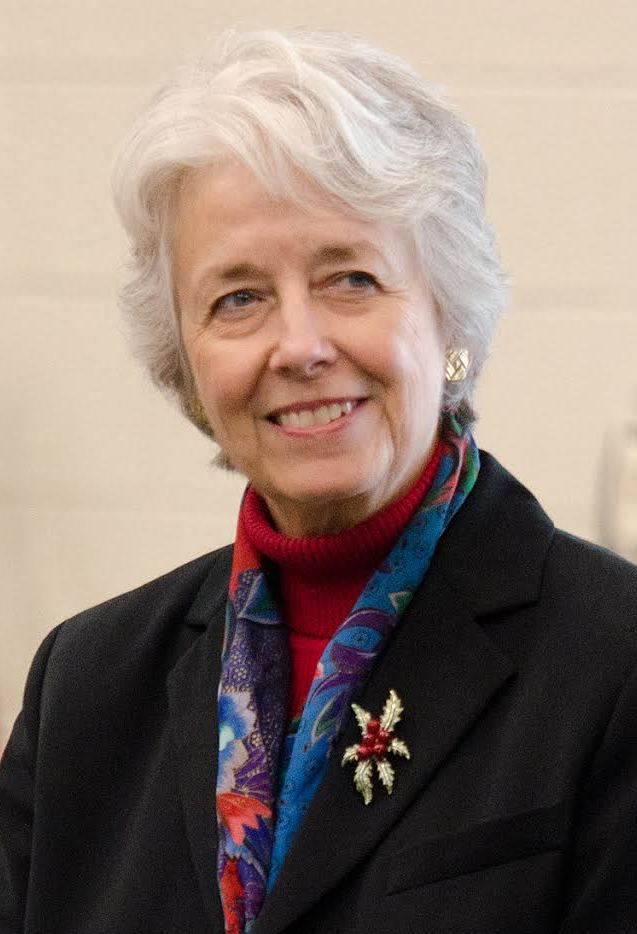

Nominee	Crit Luallen	Linda Greenwell
Party	Democratic	Republican
Popular vote	591,910	408,617
Percentage	59.2%	40.8%
- County results Luallen: 50–60% 60–70% 70–80% 80–90% Kemper: 50–60% 60–70% 70–80%
Auditor of Public Accounts before election
Crit Luallen
Democratic
Elected Auditor of Public Accounts
Crit Luallen
Democratic

Incumbent Democrat Eugenia Crittenden Blackburn "Crit" Luallen was elected in 2003 with 50.8% of the vote. Her 2003 opponent, Linda Greenwell, staged a second campaign for the seat. A Research 2000 poll conducted in October showed Luallen garnering 55% of the vote, compared to Greenwell's 33%.

=== Results ===
2007 Kentucky Auditor of Public Accounts election
Party	Candidate	Votes	%	±%
Democratic	Crit Luallen (incumbent)	591,910	59.2	+8.4
Republican	Linda Greenwell	408,617	40.8	−8.4

== State Treasurer ==
2007 Kentucky State Treasurer election
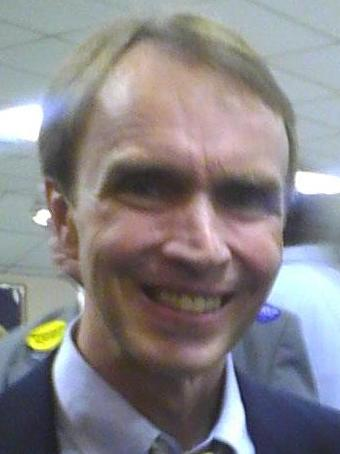

Nominee	Todd Hollenbach	Melinda Wheeler
Party	Democratic	Republican
Popular vote	573,890	424,312
Percentage	57.5%	42.5%
- County results Hollenbach: 50–60% 60–70% 70–80% 80–90% Wheeler: 50–60% 60–70% 70–80%
Treasurer before election
Jonathan Miller
Democratic
Elected Treasurer
Todd Hollenbach
Democratic

Two-term incumbent Democratic Jonathan Miller made a failed run for governor in 2007, leaving this seat open. The candidates who contested this office were Democrat Todd Hollenbach IV, an attorney, and Republican Melinda Wheeler, the director of the Administrative Office of the Courts for Kentucky court system. Hollenbach led Wheeler 51–36 in a Research 2000 poll conducted in October.

=== Results ===
2007 Kentucky State Treasurer election
Party	Candidate	Votes	%	±%
Democratic	Todd Hollenbach	573,890	57.5	+0.9
Republican	Melinda Wheeler	424,312	42.5	−0.9

== Commissioner of Agriculture ==
2007 Kentucky Commissioner of Agriculture election
- November 6, 2007
Nominee	Richie Farmer	David Lynn Williams
Party	Republican	Democratic
Popular vote	644,036	362,339
Percentage	64.0%	36.0%
- County results Farmer: 50–60% 60–70% 70–80% 80–90% Lynn: 50–60% 70–80%
Agriculture Commissioner before election
Richie Farmer
Republican
Elected Agriculture Commissioner
Richie Farmer
Republican

Incumbent Republican and former University of Kentucky basketball star Richie Farmer was elected in 2003 with 55.2% of the vote. He was challenged by Democrat David Lynn Williams. Farmer was shown to have a 54–35 lead over Williams in an October Research 2000 poll.

=== Results ===
2007 Kentucky Commissioner of Agriculture election
Party	Candidate	Votes	%	±%
Republican	Richie Farmer (incumbent)	644,036	64.0	+8.8
Democratic	David Lynn Williams	362,339	36.0	−8.8
