= 2011 Kentucky elections =

Elections were held in Kentucky 6am to 6pm on Tuesday, November 8, 2011. Primary elections were held on Tuesday May 17, 2011.

== State officials ==
Governor/Lt. Governor Slate

Secretary of State

Attorney General

Auditor of Public Accounts

State Treasurer

Commissioner of Agriculture
