= KC Crosbie =

American politician (born 1969)

Co-Chair of the Republican National Committee
- Incumbent
- Assumed office January 17, 2025
- Chair: Michael Whatley; Joe Gruters
- Preceded by: Lara Trump

Treasurer of the Republican National Committee
- In office January 27, 2023 – January 17, 2025
- Preceded by: Tony Parker
- Succeeded by: Joe Gruters

Personal details
- Born: November 26, 1969 (age 56) Dayton, Ohio, U. S.
- Party: Republican
- Spouse: Scott Crosbie
- Children: 3
- Education: University of Kentucky (BA)

KC Crosbie (born November 26, 1969) is a member of Republican Party, currently serving as the Co-Chair of the Republican National Committee (RNC), since January 17, 2025, succeeding Lara Trump. She has been the committeeman representative to the RNC from Kentucky since August 27, 2012.

== Early life and education ==
Born on November 26, 1969, in Dayton, Ohio, Crosbie graduated summa cum laude from the University of Kentucky in 1992 with a Bachelor of Arts in Communication.

== Career ==
Crosbie's political career began in 2006 when she was elected to the Lexington-Fayette Urban County Council, representing the 7th District. She served three consecutive terms. She was the Republican nominee in the 2011 Kentucky State Treasurer election, losing to incumbent Democratic treasurer Todd Hollenbach.

She has been the National Committeewoman for the Kentucky Republican Party since 2012 and was elected as the RNC Treasurer in 2023.

== Personal life ==
Crosbie is married to Scott Crosbie, a Lexington attorney and former member of the Lexington-Fayette Urban County Council. Scott unsuccessfully ran for Lexington mayor in 2002.
