= Senator Herron =

Senator Herron may refer to:

- John Herron (Australian politician) (1932–2019), Senate of Australia
- Keturah Herron (born 1980), Kentucky State Senate
- Paul Herron (1924–2004), Kentucky State Senate
- Roy Herron (1953–2023), Tennessee State Senate
