= John Hall (Kentucky politician) =

American politician (1939–2016)

Member of the Kentucky Senate from the 4th district
- In office January 1, 1987 – January 1, 1991
- Preceded by: Henry G. Lackey
- Succeeded by: Henry G. Lackey

Personal details
- Born: November 20, 1939
- Died: September 18, 2016 (aged 76)
- Party: Democratic

John W. Hall (November 20, 1939 – September 18, 2016) was an American politician from Kentucky who was a member of the Kentucky Senate from 1987 to 1991. Hall was elected in 1986, defeating incumbent senator Henry G. Lackey for renomination. He was defeated for renomination in 1990 in a rematch with Lackey.

He died in September 2016 at age 76.
