= Henry G. Lackey =

American politician (1947–2026)

Henry Lackey

Member of the Kentucky Senate from the 4th district
- In office January 1, 1991 – January 1, 1995
- Preceded by: John Hall
- Succeeded by: Paul Herron
- In office January 1, 1982 – January 1, 1987
- Preceded by: William Sullivan
- Succeeded by: John Hall

Personal details
- Born: 1947
- Died: February 5, 2026 (aged 78)
- Party: Democratic

Henry G. Lackey (1947 – February 5, 2026) was an American politician from Kentucky who was a member of the Kentucky Senate from 1982 to 1987 and 1991 to 1995. Lackey was first elected in 1981 following retirement of incumbent senator William Sullivan. He was defeated for renomination in 1986 by John Hall. Lackey challenged Hall again in 1990, defeating him in a rematch. In 1994, Lackey ran Kentucky's 1st congressional district, losing the Democratic nomination to incumbent representative Tom Barlow. Lackey died on February 5, 2026, at the age of 78.
