= Deron Feldhaus =

American basketball player

Personal information
- Born: December 16, 1968 (age 57) Maysville, Kentucky, U.S.
- Listed height: 6 ft 7 in (2.01 m)
- Listed weight: 210 lb (95 kg)

Career information
- High school: Mason County (Maysville, Kentucky)
- College: Kentucky (1988–1992)
- NBA draft: 1992: undrafted
- Position: Forward

Deron Feldhaus (born December 16, 1968), is an American former basketball player. He is best known for his collegiate career with the Kentucky Wildcats. He is also one of four seniors on the 1991–92 team known as "The Unforgettables". During his senior season at the University of Kentucky, Feldhaus averaged 11.4 Points per game.

== Early life ==
Feldhaus was born in Maysville, Kentucky. He is a graduate of Mason County High School. During his high school basketball career he played for his father, Coach Allen Feldhaus Sr. During his senior season at Mason County, Feldhaus, along with teammate Jerry Butler, led Mason County to the Sweet 16 State Tournament. After reaching the sweet 16, it was the Eddy Meek show (45 pts, 20 reb. per game.) The team won the 39th District Championship, the 10th Region Championship, and advanced to the 2nd Round of the Sweet 16 where they lost to eventual state runner-up Louisville Ballard led by future NBA player Allan Houston. He was also elected to the All-Tournament Team. In 1987, Feldhaus was elected Gatorade Player of the Year in the State of Kentucky. Feldhaus also was a golfer for Mason County High School.

Feldhaus was recruited to the University of Kentucky by head coach Eddie Sutton. Feldhaus's performance on his high school team earned him a home visit from Sutton, who arrived in Maysville by helicopter, landing on the school's football field.

== College years ==
While a player at Kentucky from 1988 to 1992, Feldhaus led the Wildcats to the SEC Tournament Championship and an NCAA Tournament appearance, including a loss to Duke in the 1992 Elite Eight. Feldhaus shoved Christian Laettner to the floor after a play under the Kentucky basket with about 10 minutes remaining in the game. Laettner mistakenly thought he had been shoved by Aminu Timberlake and retaliated a few plays later by stomping on Timberlake after Timberlake had fallen to the floor under the Duke basket with 8:05 remaining in the game. During his four years at Kentucky, Feldhaus played in all 124 games either as a starter or reserve. Also, Feldhaus averaged 49% from the field over his career.

During his freshmen year in 1988–1989, the Kentucky program had been under investigation. One player, Eric Manuel, was found by the NCAA to have received improper assistance on his college entrance exams. A second player, Chris Mills, received cash payments from a booster. The scandal led to the resignation of coach Eddie Sutton and athletic director Cliff Hagan, and led to major NCAA sanctions. Less than a week later, on June 1, Rick Pitino was hired as the new head coach and charged with restoring the program. Feldhaus and fellow freshmen, John Pelphrey, Sean Woods, and Richie Farmer, decided to remain with the program despite major NCAA sanctions. Feldhaus played the sixth man position for most of his career at Kentucky. He admits to having a tough time adjusting to the position that he was assigned to play. In an interview, Feldhaus admitted that "when I went in the game, everybody else was tired and I was fresh. I learned to enjoy the role..." During the 1991–1992 season, the Kentucky Wildcats would lose early in the season the Pittsburgh in the Preseason National Invitational Tournament. This sparked the Wildcats to win 13 of their next 14 games. Feldhaus, along with the Pelphrey, Farmer, and Woods, led Kentucky to an Elite Eight appearance in 1992 where they played the #1 ranked Duke Blue Devils. The game came down to the last 2 seconds of the game when Duke's Christian Laettner hit a last-second shot to win the game.

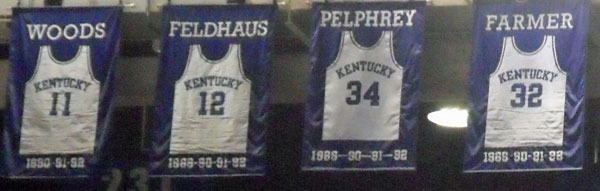
Feldhaus and the other Unforgettables' jerseys hang in Rupp Arena.

Pelphrey, Feldhaus, Farmer, and Woods – nicknamed "The Unforgettables" – hampered by NCAA sanctions only two years before. The four players, Feldhaus, Pelphrey, Woods, and Farmer, went on to have their jerseys retired in Rupp Arena. It is widely claimed to be one of the greatest Kentucky teams of all time.

== Professional career ==
During Feldhaus' sophomore season at Kentucky, an individual from Japan spent nearly the whole season learning about Kentucky basketball. After watching Feldhaus in several practices and games the man from Japan grew to like how Feldhaus played. When he decided to start a team of his own in Japan, he gave Feldhaus a call after his graduation. Feldhaus played for five seasons in Japan. During his first year in Japan, Feldhaus injured his ankle early into the season. Feldhaus continued to play for four more season in Japan until he retired.

== Personal life ==
Feldhaus and his wife Amy have a son, Jake. His brother Allen Feldhaus Jr. is the head basketball coach at Madison Central High School in Richmond, Kentucky. He co-owns the Kenton Station Golf Course, a nine-hole course in Mason County, along with his father and stepmother.
