= William Sullivan (Kentucky politician) =

American lawyer and politician

Member of the Kentucky Senate from the 4th district
- In office January 1, 1966 – January 1, 1982
- Preceded by: J. Murray Blue
- Succeeded by: Henry G. Lackey
- In office January 1, 1954 – January 1, 1958
- Preceded by: Stanley Hoffman
- Succeeded by: J. Murray Blue

Personal details
- Born: November 1, 1921 Harrodsburg, Kentucky
- Died: September 11, 2013 (aged 91) Henderson, Kentucky
- Education: Centre College; University of Kentucky College of Law

Military service
- Allegiance: United States
- Branch/service: United States Army
- Battles/wars: World War II

William L. Sullivan (November 1, 1921 – September 11, 2013) was an American lawyer and politician.

Born in Harrodsburg, Kentucky, Sullivan served in the United States Army during World War II. He received his bachelor's degree from Centre College and his law degree from University of Kentucky College of Law. He then practiced law. He served in the Kentucky State Senate in 1954-1958 and 1966-1982 and was acting governor of Kentucky several times. On June 15, 1972, Sullivan was one of 20 Democratic senators that voted for Kentucky to ratify the Equal Rights Amendment. He died in Henderson, Kentucky.
