= Paul Herron =

American politician

Member of the Kentucky Senate from the 4th district
- In office January 1, 1995 – June 16, 2004
- Preceded by: Henry G. Lackey
- Succeeded by: Dorsey Ridley

Personal details
- Born: William Paul Herron Jr. April 7, 1924 Dekoven, Kentucky, US
- Died: June 16, 2004 (aged 80) Evansville, Indiana, US
- Resting place: Fairmont Cemetery
- Party: Democratic

William Paul Herron Jr. (April 7, 1924 – June 16, 2004) was an American politician from Kentucky who was a member of the Kentucky Senate from 1995 to 2004. Herron was first elected in 1994 after incumbent senator Henry G. Lackey retired to run for congress. Herron died in office in June 2004 at age 80.
