= 2002 Kentucky elections =

A general election was held in the U.S. state of Kentucky on November 5, 2002. The primary election for all offices was held on May 28, 2002.

== Federal offices ==
=== United States Senate ===
Incumbent senator Mitch McConnell won reelection, defeating Democratic challenger Lois Combs Weinberg.

=== United States House of Representatives ===
Kentucky has six congressional districts, electing five Republicans and one Democrat.

== State offices ==
=== Kentucky Senate ===
Results by district

The Kentucky Senate consists of 38 members. In 2002, half of the chamber (all even-numbered districts) was up for election. Republicans maintained their majority, picking up two seats.

=== Kentucky House of Representatives ===
Results by district

All 100 seats in the Kentucky House of Representatives were up for election in 2002. Democrats maintained their majority, losing one seat.

=== Kentucky Supreme Court ===
2002 Kentucky Supreme Court 3rd district election
- November 5, 2002
- District 3
Candidate	Joseph Lambert
Popular vote	67,874
Percentage	100.0%
Justice before election
Joseph Lambert
Elected Justice
Joseph Lambert

The Kentucky Supreme Court consists of seven justices elected in non-partisan elections to staggered eight-year terms. District 3 was up for election in 2002.

==== District 3 ====
2002 Kentucky Supreme Court 3rd district election
Candidate	Votes	%
Joseph Lambert (incumbent)	Unopposed	
Total votes	67,874	100.0

=== Other judicial elections ===
All judges of the Kentucky District Courts were elected in non-partisan elections to four-year terms.

== Local offices ==
=== County officers ===
All county officials were elected in partisan elections to four-year terms. The offices include the County Judge/Executive, the Fiscal Court (Magistrates and/or Commissioners), County Clerk, County Attorney, Jailer, Coroner, Surveyor, Property Value Administrator, Constables, and Sheriff.

=== Mayors ===
Mayors in Kentucky are elected to four-year terms, with cities holding their elections in either presidential or midterm years. Cities with elections in 2002 included those in Louisville and in Lexington.

=== City councils ===
Each incorporated city elected its council members to a two-year term.

=== School boards ===
Local school board members are elected to staggered four-year terms, with half up for election in 2002.

=== Louisville Metro Council ===
The Louisville Metro Council was established in 2002, with all districts up for election.

== Ballot measures ==
=== Amendment 1 ===
==== Text ====
Are you in favor of family courts in Kentucky by amending the Kentucky Constitution to allow the Supreme Court to designate a division of circuit court as a family court?

==== Results ====
Results by county: Yes: 50–60%; 60–70%; 70–80%; 80–90%

Amendment 1
Choice	Votes	%
For	726,837	75.49
Against	236,041	24.51
Total	962,878	100.00

=== Amendment 2 ===
==== Text ====
Are you in favor of permitting the General Assembly to provide by general law for the formation, organization, and regulation of corporations by repealing certain sections of the Constitution of Kentucky relating to corporations?

==== Results ====
Results by county: Yes: 50–60%; 60–70%; 70–80%; No: 50–60%

Amendment 2
Choice	Votes	%
For	570,796	60.75
Against	368,854	39.25
Total	939,650	100.00

== See also ==
- Elections in Kentucky
- Politics of Kentucky
- Political party strength in Kentucky
