= 2002 Louisville mayoral election =

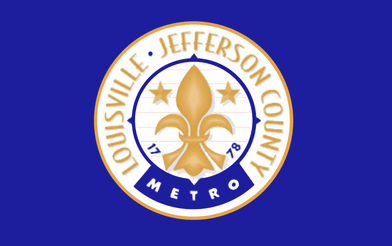
- November 5, 2002
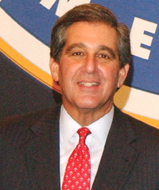

Nominee	Jerry Abramson	Jack Early
Party	Democratic	Republican
Popular vote	170,384	56,830
Percentage	73.51%	24.52%
Mayor before election
David L. Armstrong
Democratic
Elected Mayor
Jerry Abramson
Democratic

The 2002 Louisville mayoral election was held on November 5, 2002. The Republican and Democratic primary elections were held on May 28.

This was the first election of the merged metro government of Louisville and Jefferson County. Incumbent Democratic mayor David L. Armstrong, who was elected by the voters of Louisville proper in 1998, declined to seek reelection. He was succeeded by former mayor Jerry Abramson.

== Democratic primary ==
=== Candidates ===
==== Nominee ====
- Jerry Abramson, 55th Mayor of Louisville (1986–1999)

==== Eliminated in primary ====
- Jerry Mills

=== Results ===
Democratic primary results
Party	Candidate	Votes	%
Democratic	Jerry E. Abramson	61,675	88.8
Democratic	Jerry Thomas Mills	7,754	11.2
Total votes		69,429	100.0

== Republican primary ==
=== Candidates ===
==== Nominee ====
- Jack Early, state representative from the 85th district (1952–1954)

== Independent and third-party candidates ==
=== Independent candidates ===
- Bryan Bunch

=== Libertarian party ===
- Donna Walker Mancini

== General election ==
=== Results ===
2002 Louisville mayoral election
Party	Candidate	Votes	%
Democratic	Jerry E. Abramson	170,384	73.5
Republican	Jack Early	56,830	24.5
Libertarian	Donna Walker Mancini	3,756	1.6
Independent	Bryan Thomas Bunch	806	0.3
Total votes		231,776	100.0
Democratic hold			
