= 2011 Kentucky State Treasurer election =

- November 8, 2011
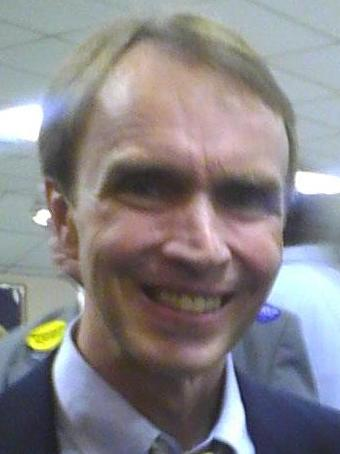

Nominee	Todd Hollenbach	KC Crosbie
Party	Democratic	Republican
Popular vote	393,413	375,916
Percentage	48.77%	46.61%
- County results Hollenbach: 40–50% 50–60% 60–70% 70–80% Crosbie: 40–50% 50–60% 60–70% 70–80%
State Treasurer before election
Todd Hollenbach
Democratic
Elected State Treasurer
Todd Hollenbach
Democratic

The state of Kentucky elected a Treasurer on November 8, 2011, for a four-year term. Primaries for this election were held on May 17, 2011. Democratic incumbent Todd Hollenbach defeated his two challengers.

The treasurer acts as head of the treasury, creates and manages the state's depository, records all monies due and payable to the state, processes warrants from the Finance and Administration, makes payments on behalf of the state, and makes an annual report.

== Democratic primary ==
=== Nominated ===
- Todd Hollenbach, incumbent State Treasurer

=== Eliminated in primary ===
- Steve Hamrick

Democratic primary results
Party	Candidate	Votes	%
Democratic	Todd Hollenbach	106,187	70.95%
Democratic	Steve Hamrick	43,473	29.05%
Total votes		149,660	100.0%

== Republican primary ==
- KC Crosbie, Lexington-Fayette Urban County Council Member

== Libertarian primary ==
- Ken Moellman

== General election ==
=== Polling ===
Poll source	Date(s) administered	Sample size	Margin of error	Todd Hollenbach (D)	K.C. Crosbie (R)	Ken Moellman (L)	Undecided
Public Policy Polling	August 25–28, 2011	600	± 4.0%	43%	28%	16%	14%

=== Results ===
2011 Kentucky State Treasurer election
Party	Candidate	Votes	%	±%
Democratic	Todd Hollenbach	393,413	48.77%	
Republican	KC Crosbie	375,916	46.61%	
Libertarian	Ken Moellman	37,261	4.62%	
Total votes		806,590	100.00%	N/A
Democratic hold				

== See also ==
- Kentucky Elections, 2011
