= 2011 Kentucky Commissioner of Agriculture election =

- November 8, 2011
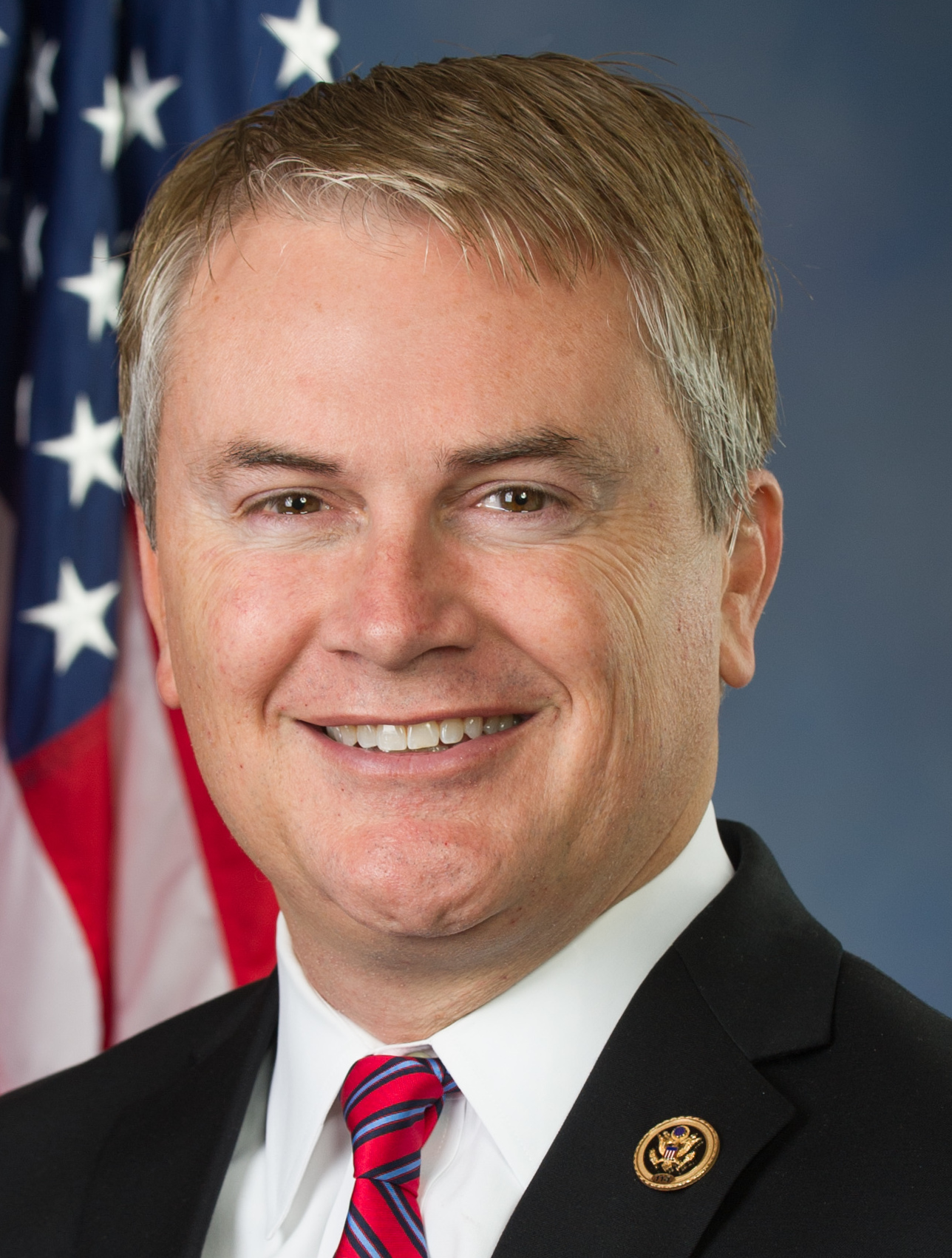
Nominee	James R. Comer	Robert Farmer
Party	Republican	Democratic
Popular vote	519,183	294,663
Percentage	63.79%	36.21%
- County results Comer: 50–60% 60–70% 70–80% 80–90% 90–100% Farmer: 50–60% 70–80%
Commissioner of Agriculture before election
Richie Farmer
Republican
Elected Commissioner of Agriculture
James R. Comer
Republican

The 2011 Kentucky Commissioner of Agriculture election was held on November 8, 2011, to elect the Kentucky Commissioner of Agriculture. Incumbent Commissioner Richie Farmer was term-limited and ineligible for reelection. He was succeeded by Republican representative James R. Comer.

== Democratic primary ==
=== Candidates ===
==== Declared ====
- Robert "Bob" Farmer
- Stewart Gritton
- John Faris Lackey
- David Williams
- B. D. Wilson

=== Results ===
Democratic primary results
Party	Candidate	Votes	%
Democratic	Robert "Bob" Farmer	45,669	30.4
Democratic	John Faris Lackey	31,565	21.0
Democratic	B. D. Wilson	29,235	19.5
Democratic	Stewart Gritton	24,897	16.6
Democratic	David Williams	18,885	12.6
Total votes		150,251	100.0

== Republican primary ==
=== Candidates ===
==== Declared ====
- James R. Comer, state representative from the 53rd district (2001–2012)
- Rob Rothenburger, Judge/Executive of Shelby County (2003–2016)

=== Results ===
Republican primary results
Party	Candidate	Votes	%
Republican	James R. Comer	86,316	66.7
Republican	Rob Rothenburger	43,150	33.3
Total votes		129,466	100.0

== General election ==
=== Results ===
2011 Kentucky Commissioner of Agriculture election
Party	Candidate	Votes	%
Republican	James R. Comer	519,183	63.79
Democratic	Robert Farmer	294,663	36.21
Total votes		813,846	100.00
Republican hold			
