= 2011 Kentucky Secretary of State election =

- November 8, 2011
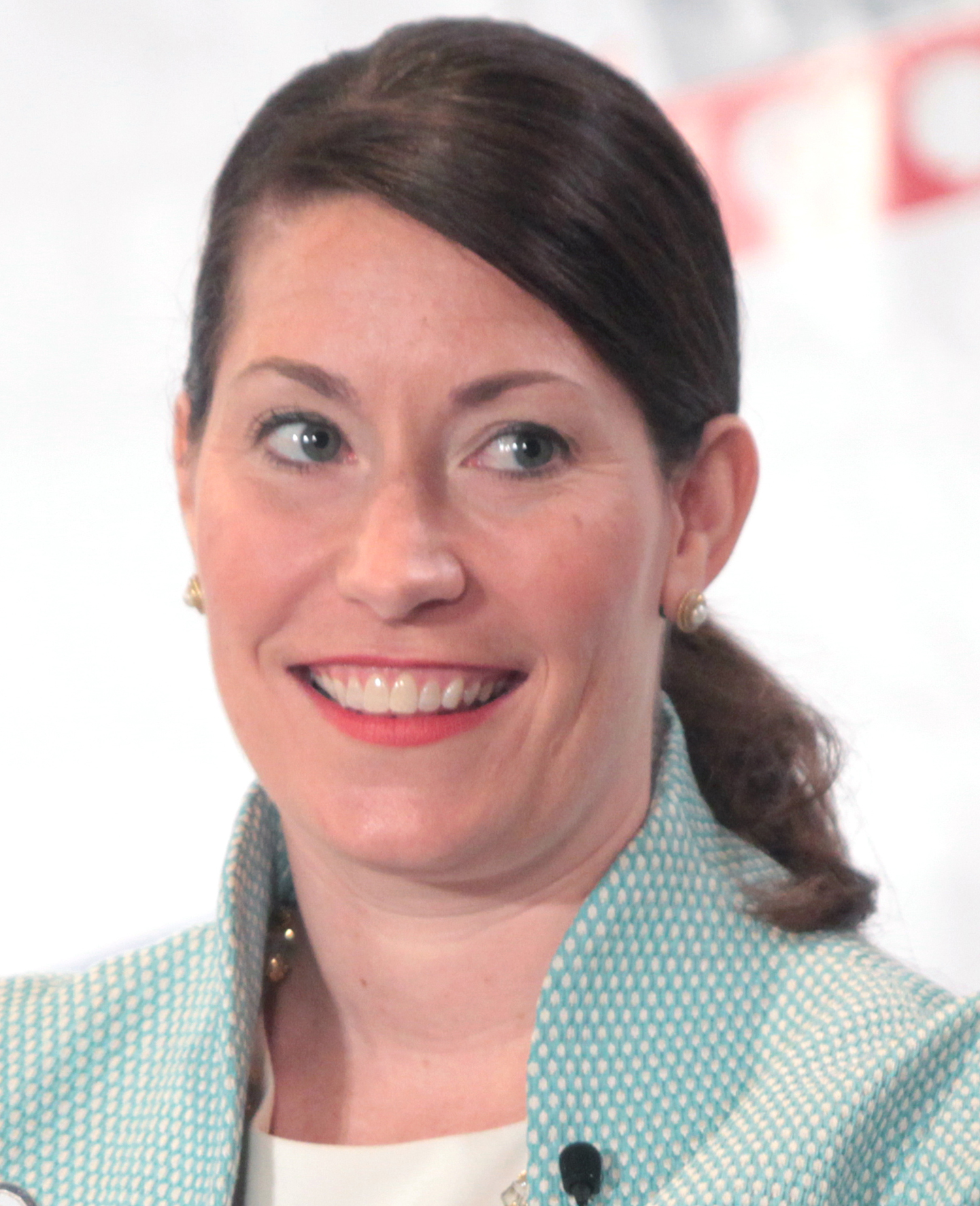

Nominee	Alison Lundergan Grimes	Bill Johnson
Party	Democratic	Republican
Popular vote	494,368	321,065
Percentage	60.63%	39.37%
- County results Grimes: 50–60% 60–70% 70–80% 80–90% Johnson: 50–60% 60–70% 70–80%
Secretary of State before election
Elaine Walker
Democratic
Elected Secretary of State
Alison Lundergan Grimes
Democratic

The 2011 Kentucky Secretary of State election was held on November 8, 2011, to elect the Secretary of State of Kentucky. Primaries for this election were held on Tuesday, May 17, 2011. In the general election, Democrat Alison Lundergan Grimes defeated Republican Bill Johnson.

== Background ==
Secretary of State Elaine Walker, a Democrat and former mayor of Bowling Green, was appointed on January 29, 2011, to fill the unexpired term of Trey Grayson. Grayson, a Republican, ran in the 2010 race for the Republican nomination for U.S. Senate, but he lost in the Republican primary to Rand Paul (who went on to be elected to the Senate). Grayson subsequently resigned to take a position at the Harvard Institute of Politics. On January 7, 2011, Governor Steve Beshear announced that he would appoint Walker as the new Secretary of State of Kentucky, following Grayson's announcement of resignation.

Walker was sworn in on January 29, 2011, inside Supreme Court chambers. She was eligible to run for a full term, and had indicated she would do so. However, she was defeated in the Democratic primary by Alison Lundergan Grimes, a Lexington lawyer and the daughter of former Kentucky Democratic Party State Chairman Jerry Lundergan, who was supported by a faction of the state's Democratic establishment. Grimes announced her candidacy at rallies in three cities, attended by Lieutenant Governor Daniel Mongiardo, state House Speaker Greg Stumbo and former Governor and then-state Senator Julian Carroll. Democratic consultant Dale Emmons, who was working for Grimes' campaign, said she also had the endorsements of U.S. Representative Ben Chandler and Lexington Mayor Jim Gray. The contested primary was the result of a long-standing feud among Kentucky Democrats. Joseph Gerth, a columnist for the Louisville Courier-Journal, wrote that "the betting money is that the selection of Walker is more about an old political grudge between Beshear and former Democratic Chairman Jerry Lundergan than it is about getting a rural Democrat on the November ballot."

Democratic State Representative Jody Richards of Bowling Green had been mentioned as a possible candidate for secretary of state, but he said on November 8 that he was not interested in running. Other Democrats who had been mentioned as possible candidates were state senator Ed Worley of Richmond, Louisville attorney Jennifer Moore and former Miss America Heather French Henry, the wife of former Lieutenant Governor Steve Henry.

Bill Johnson, a businessman from Todd County in Western Kentucky, briefly ran in the Republican primary for U.S. Senate in 2010, but withdrew from the race in March after polls showed him trailing Trey Grayson and Rand Paul. He enjoyed Tea Party support during his abortive run for Senate, and finished third in the primary election with 7,861 votes (2.2 percent) despite his withdrawal. On May 26, 2010, following his withdrawal from the race, it was reported that Johnson was considering running for governor in 2011, with Republican state Senator Damon Thayer of Georgetown on the ticket as the candidate for lieutenant governor. In August, Johnson told the media that it was unlikely he would run for governor, but he was looking at the 2011 races for secretary of state or auditor.

On August 30, 2010, Johnson announced his intent to run again, either in 2011 for Secretary of State or for state Senate, against Democratic Senator Joey Pendleton. He also said, "If I run for secretary of state and fail, I am done with politics. I have one race in me." He stated that he would not tap his personal wealth to fund his campaign, as he did with his bid for the U.S. Senate. Johnson confirmed on September 28, 2010, that he would seek the Republican nomination for Secretary of State. He was the first candidate to officially file to run in any of the 2011 statewide races. Johnson served in U.S. Navy for ten years and later lived in Florence for five years while working for General Electric in Cincinnati. He is a former procurement manager at BP and is now a substitute teacher.

On January 25, 2011, Hilda Gay Legg of Somerset became the second Republican candidate to file for secretary of state. She was co-chair of the Appalachian Regional Commission from 1990 to 1993 under George H. W. Bush and administrator of the Department of Agriculture's Rural Utilities Service under George W. Bush. Originally from Adair County and a graduate of Campbellsville University and Western Kentucky University, Legg is the former Executive Director/CEO of the Center for Rural Development in Somerset.

== Democratic primary ==
=== Candidates ===
- Elaine Walker, incumbent Secretary of State
- Alison Lundergan Grimes, lawyer, daughter of former Kentucky Democratic Party chairman Jerry Lundergan

=== Results ===
Democratic Primary results by county: Grimes: 50–60%; 60–70%; 70–80%; 80–90%; Walker: 50–60%; 60–70%; 70–80%; Tie

Democratic primary results
Party	Candidate	Votes	%
Democratic	Alison Lundergan Grimes	85,436	55.26%
Democratic	Elaine Walker (incumbent)	69,185	44.74%
Total votes		154,621	100.00%

== Republican primary ==
=== Candidates ===
- Bill Johnson, businessman and candidate for U.S. Senate in 2010
- Hilda Gay Legg

=== Results ===
Republican Primary results by county: Johnson: 50–60%; 60–70%; 70–80%; 80–90%; Legg: 50–60%; 60–70%; 70–80%; 80–90%

Republican primary results
Party	Candidate	Votes	%
Republican	Bill Johnson	66,444	50.42%
Republican	Hilda Gay Legg	65,336	49.58%
Total votes		131,780	100.00%

== General election ==
=== Polling ===
Poll source	Date(s) administered	Sample size	Margin of error	Alison Lundergan Grimes (D)	Bill Johnson (R)	Undecided
Public Policy Polling	August 25–28, 2011	600	± 4.0%	38%	35%	26%

=== Results ===
2011 Kentucky Secretary of State election
Party	Candidate	Votes	%	±%
Democratic	Alison Lundergan Grimes	494,368	60.63%	+17.68
Republican	Bill Johnson	321,065	39.37%	–17.68
Total votes		815,433	100.00%	
Democratic hold				

== See also ==
- United States elections, 2011
