= 2008 Kentucky elections =

A general election was held in the U.S. state of Kentucky on November 4, 2008. The primary election for all offices was held on May 20, 2008.

== Federal offices ==
=== United States President ===
Kentucky had 8 electoral votes in the Electoral College. Republican John McCain won all of them with 57% of the popular vote.

=== United States Senate ===
Incumbent senator Mitch McConnell won reelection, defeating Democratic challenger Bruce Lunsford.

=== United States House of Representatives ===
Kentucky has six congressional districts, electing four Republicans and two Democrats.

== State offices ==
=== Kentucky Senate ===
The Kentucky Senate consists of 38 members. In 2008, half of the chamber (all odd-numbered districts) was up for election. Republicans maintained their majority, without gaining or losing any seats.

=== Kentucky House of Representatives ===
Results by district

All 100 seats in the Kentucky House of Representatives were up for election in 2008. Democrats maintained their majority, gaining two seats.

=== Kentucky Supreme Court ===
2008 Kentucky Supreme Court elections
- November 4, 2008

3 of the 7 districts of the Kentucky Supreme Court

The Kentucky Supreme Court consists of seven justices elected in non-partisan elections to staggered eight-year terms. District 5 was up for election in 2008. Special elections were additionally held in Districts 3 and 4.

==== District 3 ====
2008 Kentucky Supreme Court 3rd district special election
- District 3
Candidate	Daniel J. Venters
Popular vote	116,889
Percentage	100.0%
Justice before election
Daniel J. Venters
Elected Justice
Daniel J. Venters

2008 Kentucky Supreme Court 3rd district special election
Candidate	Votes	%
Daniel J. Venters (incumbent)	Unopposed	
Total votes	116,889	100.0

==== District 4 ====
2008 Kentucky Supreme Court 4th district special election
- District 4
Candidate	Lisabeth Tabor Hughes	James M. Shake
Popular vote	159,378	129,152
Percentage	55.24%	44.76%
Justice before election
Lisabeth Tabor Hughes
Elected Justice
Lisabeth Tabor Hughes

2008 Kentucky Supreme Court 4th district special election
Candidate	Votes	%
Lisabeth Tabor Hughes (incumbent)	159,378	55.24
James M. Shake	129,152	44.76
Total votes	288,530	100.0

==== District 5 ====
2008 Kentucky Supreme Court 5th district election
- District 5
Candidate	Mary C. Noble
Popular vote	189,330
Percentage	100.0%
Justice before election
Mary C. Noble
Elected Justice
Mary C. Noble

2008 Kentucky Supreme Court 5th district election
Candidate	Votes	%
Mary C. Noble (incumbent)	Unopposed	
Total votes	189,330	100.0

== Local offices ==
=== Mayors ===
Mayors in Kentucky are elected to four-year terms, with cities holding their elections in either presidential or midterm years.

=== City councils ===
Each incorporated city elected its council members to a two-year term.

=== School boards ===
Local school board members are elected to staggered four-year terms, with half up for election in 2008.

=== Louisville Metro Council ===
The Louisville Metro Council is elected to staggered four-year terms, with even-numbered districts up for election in 2008.

== See also ==
- Elections in Kentucky
- Politics of Kentucky
- Political party strength in Kentucky
