= 2012 Kentucky elections =

A general election was held in the U.S. state of Kentucky on November 6, 2012. The primary election for all offices was held on May 22, 2012.

== Federal offices ==
=== United States President ===
Kentucky had 8 electoral votes in the Electoral College. Republican Mitt Romney won all of them with 60% of the popular vote.

=== United States House of Representatives ===
Kentucky has six congressional districts, electing five Republicans and one Democrat.

== State offices ==
=== Kentucky Senate ===
The Kentucky Senate consists of 38 members. In 2012, half of the chamber (all odd-numbered districts) was up for election. Republicans maintained their majority, picking up one seat.

=== Kentucky House of Representatives ===
Results by district

All 100 seats in the Kentucky House of Representatives were up for election in 2012. Democrats maintained their majority, losing four seats.

=== Kentucky Supreme Court ===
2012 Kentucky Supreme Court 7th district election
- November 6, 2012
- District 7
Candidate	Will T. Scott	Janet Stumbo
Popular vote	86,928	62,581
Percentage	58.14%	41.86%
- County results Scott: 50–60% 60–70% 70–80%
Justice before election
Will T. Scott
Elected Justice
Will T. Scott

The Kentucky Supreme Court consists of seven justices elected in non-partisan elections to staggered eight-year terms. District 7 was up for election in 2012.

==== District 7 ====
2012 Kentucky Supreme Court 7th district election
Candidate	Votes	%
Will T. Scott (incumbent)	86,928	58.14
Janet L. Stumbo	62,581	41.86
Total votes	149,509	100.0

=== Commonwealth’s Attorneys ===
Commonwealth's Attorneys, who serve as the prosecutors for felonies in the state, are elected to six-year terms. One attorney is elected for each of the 57 circuits of the Kentucky Circuit Courts.

=== Circuit Clerks ===
Each county elected a Circuit Court Clerk to a six-year term.

== Local offices ==
=== Mayors ===
Mayors in Kentucky are elected to four-year terms, with cities holding their elections in either presidential or midterm years.

=== City councils ===
Each incorporated city elected its council members to a two-year term.

=== School boards ===
Local school board members are elected to staggered four-year terms, with half up for election in 2012.

=== Louisville Metro Council ===
The Louisville Metro Council is elected to staggered four-year terms, with even-numbered districts up for election in 2012.

== Ballot measures ==
=== Amendment 1 ===
==== Text ====
Are you in favor of amending the Kentucky constitution to state that the citizens of Kentucky have the personal right to hunt, fish, and harvest wildlife, subject to laws and regulations that promote conservation and preserve the future of hunting and fishing, and to state that public hunting and fishing shall be a preferred means of managing and controlling wildlife?

==== Results ====
Results by county: Yes: 70–80%; 80–90%; 90–100%

Amendment 1
Choice	Votes	%
For	1,298,340	84.49
Against	238,320	15.51
Total	1,536,660	100.00

== See also ==
- Elections in Kentucky
- Politics of Kentucky
- Political party strength in Kentucky
