= 2011 Kentucky Auditor of Public Accounts election =

- November 8, 2011
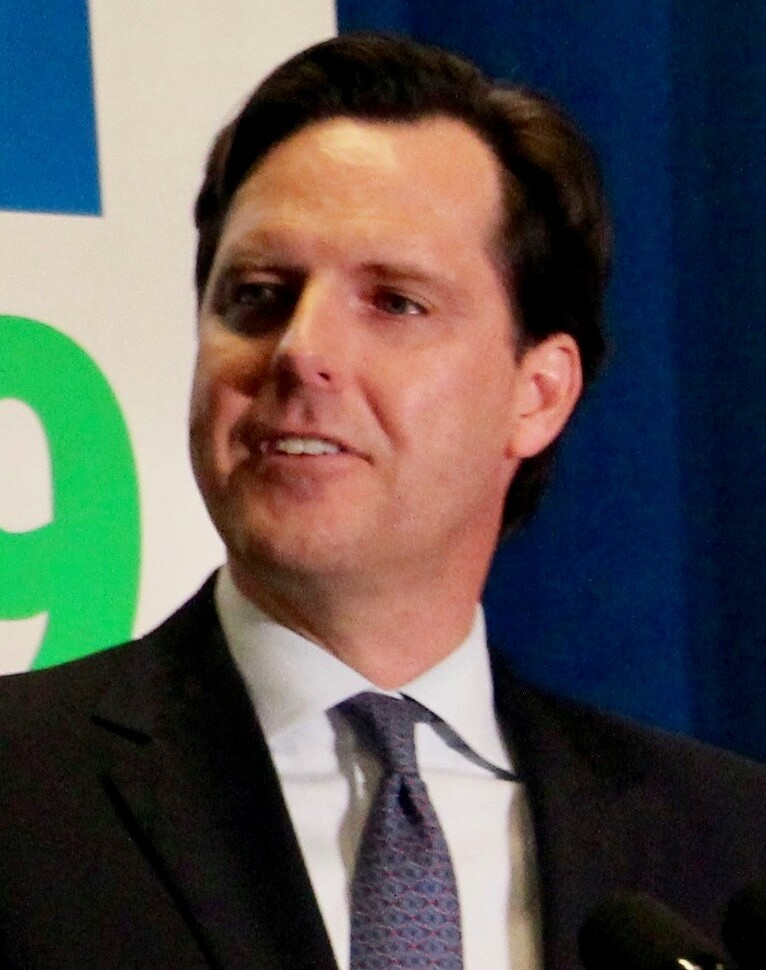

Nominee	Adam Edelen	John T. Kemper
Party	Democratic	Republican
Popular vote	449,638	367,661
Percentage	55.75%	44.24%
- County results Edelen: 50–60% 60–70% 70–80% Kemper: 50–60% 60–70% 70–80%
Auditor of Public Accounts before election
Crit Luallen
Democratic
Elected Auditor of Public Accounts
Adam Edelen
Democratic

The state of Kentucky elected an Auditor of Public Accounts November 8, 2011. Primaries for this election were held on Tuesday May 17, 2011. In the November 8, 2011 general election, Democrat Adam Edelen was elected to his first term as Auditor.

The auditor checks the financial books of all state agencies, school districts and county governments and performs special investigations.

== Background ==
Current Auditor of Public Accounts Crit Luallen (D) is ineligible to run due to term limits.

== Candidates ==
Based on the candidate filing report with the office of the Kentucky Secretary of State after the January 25, 2011 filing deadline, the following candidates filed to run for Auditor.

=== Republican primary ===
==== Nominated ====
- John T. Kemper, Lexington area small residential builder/developer

==== Eliminated in primary ====
- Addia Wuchner, state representative from Hebron in Boone County

Republican primary results
Party	Candidate	Votes	%
Republican	John T. Kemper	70,876	57.28%
Republican	Addia Wuchner	52,869	42.72%
Total votes		123,745	100.0%

=== Democrats ===
- Adam Edelen, former chief of staff to Governor Steve Beshear

== General election ==
=== Polling ===
Poll source	Date(s) administered	Sample size	Margin of error	Adam Edelen (D)	John Kemper III (R)	Undecided
Public Policy Polling	August 25–28, 2011	600	± 4.0%	34%	31%	35%

=== Results ===
2011 Kentucky Auditor election
Party	Candidate	Votes	%	±%
Democratic	Adam Edelen	440,345	55.75%	
Republican	John T. Kemper	349,366	44.24%	
Write-In	Kim C. Hay	75	0.01%	
Total votes		789,786	100.00%	N/A
Democratic hold				

== See also ==
- Kentucky Elections, 2011
