= Richie Farmer =

American politician & basketball player (born 1969)

33rd Kentucky Commissioner of Agriculture
- In office January 5, 2004 – January 2, 2012
- Governor: Ernie Fletcher; Steve Beshear
- Preceded by: Billy Ray Smith
- Succeeded by: James Comer

Personal details
- Born: Richard Dwight Farmer, Jr. August 25, 1969 (age 57) Corbin, Kentucky, U.S.
- Party: Republican
- Education: University of Kentucky
- Basketball career

Personal information
- Listed height: 6 ft 0 in (1.83 m)
- Listed weight: 170 lb (77 kg)

Career information
- High school: Clay County (Manchester, Kentucky)
- College: Kentucky (1988–1992)
- NBA draft: 1992: undrafted
- Position: Guard
- Number: 32

Career highlights
- Kentucky Mr. Basketball (1988)

Richard Dwight Farmer Jr. (born August 25, 1969) is an American former collegiate basketball player and Republican Party politician from the U.S. state of Kentucky. He served as the Kentucky Commissioner of Agriculture from 2004 to 2012 and was the running mate of David L. Williams in the 2011 gubernatorial election. After leaving office, Farmer was investigated for violating state campaign finance laws and misappropriating state resources and was sentenced to 27 months in federal prison along with a concurrent 12 months in state prison.

A point guard, Farmer led Clay County High School to the 1987 Kentucky High School Athletic Association (KHSAA) State Basketball Championship and, in 1988, was named Kentucky Mr. Basketball and Kentucky Associated Press Male High School Athlete of the Year after setting a championship game record with 51 points in a losing effort. Although he was popular state-wide and publicly stated his desire to play collegiate basketball for the Kentucky Wildcats, Coach Eddie Sutton was reluctant to offer Farmer a scholarship. After Farmer announced that he would visit other colleges and issued a deadline past which he would no longer consider Kentucky without a scholarship offer, Sutton relented and Farmer joined the University of Kentucky.

Kentucky struggled during Farmer's first year, finishing with a 13–19 record, and by mid-season, fans were accusing Sutton of unfairly favoring his son, Sean, over Farmer at the point guard position. Sutton resigned in the offseason due to a pay-for-play scandal for which the NCAA banned Kentucky from postseason play for two years. Sutton's replacement, Rick Pitino, instituted a rigorous conditioning program and fast-paced style of play that improved Farmer's performance. After spending his junior season as a backup to Sean Woods, Farmer transitioned to shooting guard and became a starter in the middle of his senior year. Again eligible for postseason competition, the Wildcats won the Southeastern Conference tournament and reached the Regional Finals of the 1992 NCAA Tournament, losing in overtime on a last-second shot by Duke's Christian Laettner in a game regarded by many as the greatest college basketball game ever played. The team's seniors – Farmer, Woods, John Pelphrey, and Deron Feldhaus – were dubbed "The Unforgettables", and their jerseys were hung from the rafters of Rupp Arena following the 1991–92 season.

Farmer parlayed his status as a basketball icon into two terms as Kentucky Agriculture Commissioner from 2004 to 2012, winning both elections by large margins. In 2011, Kentucky Senate President David L. Williams tapped Farmer – considered a rising star in the state Republican Party – as his running mate in the gubernatorial election. They were defeated by Democratic Governor Steve Beshear and his running mate Jerry Abramson.

During the campaign, media reports alleged that Farmer had misused state funds and property as agriculture commissioner and Farmer's successor collaborated with the state auditor to investigate the allegations. As a result, the Executive Branch Ethics Commission charged Farmer with 42 ethics violations – the most against an individual in state history. Attorney General Jack Conway also charged Farmer with violating state campaign finance laws, and a federal grand jury followed with five indictments for abuses of power. Farmer initially contested the charges, but later agreed to a plea bargain. On January 14, 2014, Farmer was sentenced to 27 months in federal prison and ordered to pay $120,500 in restitution and $65,000 in fines. He served almost 20 months in a satellite camp of the United States Penitentiary, Hazelton near Bruceton Mills, West Virginia, before transitioning to a halfway house in Lexington, Kentucky, on December 18, 2015. He was released from the halfway house on January 21, 2016 and is currently residing in Clay County.

== Early life ==
Richard Dwight ("Richie") Farmer, Jr. was born on August 25, 1969, in Corbin, Kentucky, but grew up in the eastern Kentucky town of Manchester. He was the second of three children born to Richard and Virginia Farmer. Because of his physical maturity – he reportedly began shaving at age 12 and had begun wearing his trademark mustache by his junior year in high school – Farmer was frequently questioned about his age. The 5 ft 11 in (1.80 m) left-hander's vertical leap measured 40 inches (100 cm) in high school. He credited his father, a transportation manager at a local coal mine and a standout point guard at Clay County High School in 1963, with developing his basketball acumen.

As an eighth grader, Farmer played basketball for his grade school basketball team, as well as the freshman, junior varsity, and varsity teams at Clay County High School. He played sparingly during the varsity team's regular season but received 68 seconds of playing time – scoring 2 points – during the Tigers' victory over Owensboro High School in the 1984 Kentucky High School Athletic Association (KHSAA) State Basketball Championship. He also played football on a team that won the county championship that year. He eventually stopped playing football, but continued to play baseball – as a pitcher and first baseman – in addition to basketball until his senior year of high school.

== High school basketball ==
=== Freshman and sophomore ===
As a freshman, Farmer led his team in scoring during the regular season, averaging 16.4 points per game from the shooting guard position. He also led the Tigers in scoring in each of their three games en route to the 13th Region Kentucky High School Athletic Association basketball championship. In the opening round of the 1985 KHSAA state tournament, Farmer scored 14 points on 6 of 16 shooting in a win over Boone County High School. Then, in back-to-back victories against Metcalfe County High School and Doss High School, he led his team with 21 and 20 points, respectively, to help Clay County reach the tournament finals. Farmer scored 10 points in Clay County's 65–64 loss to Hopkinsville High School in the championship game. He was the tournament's second-highest scorer with 69 points, one behind Hopkinsville's Lamont Ware, and finished second in the voting for the tournament's Most Valuable Player, which went to Hopkinsville's Wendell Quarles. Only Apollo High School's Rex Chapman received more votes for the all-tournament team.

Clay County ranked only behind Owensboro and Scott County High School in the Lexington Herald-Leader's 1985–86 preseason coaches poll. During Clay County's 22–6 regular season, Farmer, who moved to the point guard position, averaged 18.6 points, 10 assists, and 8 rebounds per game. The Tigers won the 13th District Title, setting up a matchup with Pulaski County High School in the first round of the KSHAA state tournament. Farmer had scored 30 points in Clay County's regular season matchup with Pulaski County, but his team lost by one point in overtime. In the tournament rematch, Pulaski County held Farmer to 20 points and won 83–78; Coach Dave Fraley credited a defense centered on stopping Farmer for his team's victory.

=== Junior ===
In the Lexington Herald-Leader's 1986–87 preseason coaches' poll, Clay County was ranked 14th in the state, and Farmer was named one of the state's best 25 players. Farmer led his team in scoring at 23.9 points per game, and Clay County finished the regular season with a record of 28–2 and again won the 13th Region tournament. Farmer scored 19 points and grabbed 5 rebounds in his team's 90–80 victory over Highlands High School in the KHSAA state tournament's opening round, but his performance was overshadowed by teammate Russell Chadwell's 43 points. In the quarterfinals, Farmer led the Tigers with 19 points, defeating LaRue County High School 62–56 in front of 24,041 spectators at Lexington's Rupp Arena, a record crowd for a high school basketball game. In the first half of Clay County's semi-final matchup with Madison Central High School, Farmer scored 18 and his younger brother, Russ, added 12 to account for 30 of their team's 39 first-half points. The Tigers' 17-point halftime lead grew to as many as 25 in the second half, and the elder Farmer again led his team with 24 total points in Clay County's 78–58 victory.

The win over Madison Central set up a title game between Clay County and Louisville's Ballard High School. Clay County had only one starter taller than 6 feet (1.8 m), while Ballard started four players taller than 6 ft 3 in (1.91 m), including star shooting guard Allan Houston. The game featured 24 ties and 15 lead changes; neither team led by more than four points during regulation. Farmer scored Clay County's last 9 points in regulation, including consecutive go-ahead baskets at 3:19, 2:46, and 0:30. Ballard's Leonard Taylor scored on a put-back basket at the buzzer to tie the score at 65 and force overtime. Clay County never trailed in the overtime, and Farmer's 15-foot (4.6 m) jump shot with 1:44 left put the Tigers in the lead for good. The 76–73 win was Clay County's first-ever KHSAA state championship. Farmer played all 35 minutes of the game and led all scorers with 27 points to go with 6 rebounds and 4 assists. He was named to the all-tournament team, selected the tournament's Most Valuable Player, and given the Ted Sanford Award for citizenship, basketball ability, academic achievement, and sportsmanship. He was also the only underclassman named to the Lexington Herald-Leader's 1987 All-State First Team.

In the summer following his junior year, Farmer was named to the Kentucky Junior All-Star Team, which played exhibition games throughout Europe, including stops in Iceland, the Netherlands, and West Germany. After the European trip, he helped lead Clay County to a 15–0 record in Amateur Athletic Union play. It was the first AAU season which recognized the three-point field goal, and Farmer made 53 of his 73 three-point attempts. In July 1987, the Kentucky Junior All-Stars finished second to a team from South Carolina in the Kentucky Prep All-Star Festival at Memorial Coliseum in Lexington; Farmer sat out the championship game with a hand injury he suffered in the previous game.

=== Senior ===
Clay County was ranked as the top team in the state in the 1987–88 preseason coaches' poll, and Farmer was voted the state's best prep prospect, garnering twice as many votes as second-place prospect Allan Houston. The Tigers started the year 8–0 before suffering their only regular season loss in the first game of the 1987 Beach Ball Classic against Eau Claire High School. In Clay County's next game in the Classic, Farmer broke the school's career scoring record, scoring his 2,193rd point in a 76–57 win over Tulsa, Oklahoma's Nathan Hale High School. Gary Gregory, who had held the record since 1974, was in attendance at the game. In the tournament's fifth place game, Farmer scored 33 points and broke the single-game record for assists with 16, besting Kenny Anderson's year-old record of 13. Clay County defeated Simi Valley High School 95–91, and Farmer was selected as the tournament's Outstanding Player and named to the all-tournament team.

In the opening round of the January 1988 Louisville Invitational Tournament (LIT), Farmer scored 40 points on 15 of 30 shooting in an 86–82 win over Pleasure Ridge Park High School, pushing Clay County's record to 16–1 and setting up another meeting with Allan Houston's Ballard team. Farmer scored 39 points – including 14 of his 15 free throws – and grabbed 12 rebounds in Clay County's 92–88 double overtime victory. In the championship game against Bardstown High School, Farmer battled through fatigue and a thigh injury to lead his team in scoring with 24 points in an overtime win. In the three-game tournament, Farmer scored 103 points and played all of his team's 105 minutes, while committing only 4 turnovers. He was selected to the all-tournament team and named tournament MVP. Already being recruited by Western Kentucky, Alabama, and Notre Dame, Farmer's performances in the Beach Ball Classic and LIT brought notice from Eastern Kentucky, Wake Forest, Auburn, Louisville, and Kentucky.

In the 49th District Championship game, Farmer broke Clay County's single-game scoring record with 51 points in a 101–59 win over Jackson County High School. In the 13th Region tournament opener, Farmer scored 40 points as Clay County defeated Corbin High School 75–56. Clay County went on to defeat Bell County High School 53–36 in the semi-finals and Knox Central High School 73–69 in the finals to once again advance to the KHSAA state tournament. Farmer scored 38 points on 14 of 24 shooting in a victory over Rowan County High School in the tournament's opening round. Four minutes into the Tigers' quarterfinal matchup against LaRue County High School, Farmer scored a three-point basket that tied Wallace "Wah Wah" Jones' record for most points scored by a single player in the KHSAA state tournament (223). Farmer went on to break the record, scoring 30 points in a 91–54 win.

Farmer's 18 points in the semi-finals against Pleasure Ridge Park helped Clay County to a 92–90 win and a rematch in the title game against Ballard High School. Farmer set a title game record against Ballard, scoring 51 points on 20 of 32 shooting (including 9 of 14 from three-point range), but Clay County lost 88–79. Ron King set the previous title game record in 1969 with 44; only Kelly Coleman's 69-point performance in 1956 bested Farmer's 51 points in a tournament game. He was selected to the all-tournament team, received a Dawahares' Sweet Sixteen Academic Scholarship Award, and was voted the tournament's MVP. Following the state tournament, Farmer said he was contacted by LSU, Vanderbilt, Virginia, and Indiana in addition to schools who had previously recruited him.

For the season, Farmer averaged 27.1 points, 6.4 rebounds and 8.7 assists per game, all career highs. The only player to play in the KHSAA state tournament five times, he finished his career with records for most points scored (317) and most field goals made (127) for a career in the tournament. He posted a total of 2,793 points in his high school career. He was named Kentucky Mr. Basketball, Kentucky Associated Press Male High School Athlete of the Year, and was the leading vote-getter for the Kentucky All-State Team, appearing on 160 of 167 ballots. The Clay County Judge/Executive renamed a road outside Farmer's hometown of Manchester "Richie Boulevard". In a 1989 Lexington Herald-Leader poll of sportswriters and former high school coaches, Farmer was the near-unanimous choice as the best high school player in Kentucky during the 1980s.

In May 1988, Farmer was selected to an AAU all-star team that played an exhibition game in Memorial Coliseum against an all-star team from the Soviet Union. He scored 17 points in a 107–93 win. In the first of two matchups with Indiana's All-Star team, the Kentucky All-Stars lost 102–82; Farmer had a bad shooting performance, going 5 of 18 from the field, including 2 of 9 from three-point range, for 15 points. In the rematch the following week, Farmer scored 19 points in a 112–100 loss.

=== Recruitment ===
Despite Farmer's prolific scoring, recruiters expressed concern about his small stature and lack of quickness. Even while lauding his skills, Lexington Herald-Leader sportswriter Mike Fields wrote that Farmer had "heavy legs and slow-going style". Regarding Farmer's size, Fields noted that, despite playing point guard, Farmer consistently jumped center for Clay County and could jump high enough to execute a two-handed slam dunk. The Herald-Leader's Billy Reed compared Farmer to Indiana's Steve Alford, who overcame doubts about his size, speed, and defense to become the Hoosiers' all-time leading scorer and lead them to an NCAA Championship in 1987.

Kentucky was believed to be Farmer's school of choice, but coaches remained non-committal about his recruitment. The Wildcats had seven returning guards and small forwards – Rex Chapman, Eric Manuel, Deron Feldhaus, Derrick Miller, John Pelphrey, Johnathon Davis, and Sean Sutton – and two signed recruits at those positions – Sean Woods and Chris Mills. Conversely, four of their five frontcourt players – Winston Bennett, Rob Lock, Cedric Jenkins and Richard Madison – were graduating, and lone frontcourt signee Shawn Kemp had not yet qualified academically. On March 21, 1988, Farmer told a Lexington television station that he would no longer consider Kentucky if they did not offer him a scholarship by the weekend. A week later, the Lexington Herald-Leader reported that coach Eddie Sutton extended the offer but that Farmer planned to take official visits to Western Kentucky and Vanderbilt, and would host an in-home visit with LSU coach Dale Brown before deciding whether to accept Sutton's offer.

In April, Farmer played shooting guard for the North team in the Kentucky Derby Festival Classic. He scored 14 points on 5 of 12 shooting and grabbed 3 rebounds, but his team lost to the South team 134–125. Among his teammates in the Classic was Kentucky signee Sean Woods, who told the Lexington Herald-Leader that he and Farmer had become good friends and that he hoped Farmer would choose to play for the Wildcats. The paper also reported that Farmer had narrowed his list of potential college choices to three: Western Kentucky, LSU, and Kentucky. Farmer took an official visit to Western Kentucky the weekend of April 9, 1988, but on April 14, the second day of the April signing period, he held a press conference at his high school gymnasium to announce that he had signed a National Letter of Intent with Kentucky. He told the assembled crowd, "[Playing for Kentucky has] been a dream of mine as long as I can remember. Even before kindergarten, I always wanted to play for Kentucky."

== College basketball ==
=== Freshman ===
By the time Farmer arrived at Kentucky, the roster had been decimated. Standout shooting guard Rex Chapman entered the 1988 NBA draft, ending his collegiate eligibility. Sophomore Eric Manuel was held out of basketball activities pending the outcome of an investigation into his ACT scores. Signees Shawn Kemp and Sean Woods failed to qualify academically, and Chris Mills was under investigation by the NCAA for cash allegedly sent to his father by assistant coach Dwane Casey in violation of the Association's amateurism rules. A viral illness forced Farmer to miss about a third of the team's preseason practices. Once he was able to practice, Coach Eddie Sutton related that he lacked the conditioning to finish most practices. The Lexington Herald-Leader's Jerry Tipton later reported that Farmer had to leave practice half an hour early two days a week to attend his American History class. Sutton also opined that Farmer's high school competition was inferior to that of Los Angeles native Mills, but Farmer's high school coach pointed out that, during Farmer's senior season, 20 of his team's games were against teams ranked in the top 20 in their respective states.

In his first collegiate game, against Duke, Farmer played 7 minutes and air balled his only shot. After an early season loss to Notre Dame in the Big Four Classic dropped the Wildcats' record to 2–3, Sutton noted that Farmer, Sean Sutton, and LaRon Ellis had all missed practice time with the flu. After managing just 17 points in the Wildcats' first five games, Farmer scored 10 points in 20 minutes in the team's sixth game against Northwestern State. With 12 seconds to go in the game and Kentucky trailing 84–82, Farmer was whistled for an intentional foul on Northwestern State's Roman Banks while trying to draw a charge on an inbounds play. Banks maintained that Farmer had tugged Banks toward him and fallen down, attempting to draw the call, but Farmer and Sutton both denied the alleged chicanery. Banks hit one of two free throws, and Farmer missed a potentially game-tying three-point shot at the buzzer, dropping the Wildcats to 2–4 on the season. Farmer followed up with a 15-point performance in a win against Western Carolina. In the Kentucky Invitational Tournament, where Kentucky lost its opening round game to Bowling Green before winning the third-place game against Marshall, Farmer scored 12 points in each game.

Farmer's sudden increase in scoring prompted complaints from the fan base that Sutton disliked Farmer and was limiting his minutes out of favoritism for his son, Sean. Some fans began to boo when Sutton, the team's starting point guard, returned to the game to replace Farmer. Farmer maintained that Sutton had treated him fairly, and Sutton cited lack of practice time as the reason for Farmer's limited playing time; in early January 1989, local media reported that Farmer had been limited in practice due to right knee pain. Questions about Farmer's playing time continued into Southeastern Conference play, even as Farmer's scoring also dropped off. By late January, Sutton publicly complained about the need for more scoring from the bench, which had produced only 29 points in the team's previous seven games. Lexington Herald-Leader columnist Billy Reed wrote: "Richie simply isn't ready to play at this level yet".

Before a January game against Georgia, two-time former governor A. B. "Happy" Chandler presented Farmer with the 1988 Kentucky Sportsman of the Year Award. The youngest person and first high school athlete ever to win the award, Farmer finished ahead of former Kentucky guard Pat Riley, who had just coached the NBA's Los Angeles Lakers to a second consecutive championship.

With the Wildcats' record sitting at 11–13 overall and 6–6 in conference play headed into a February road game against conference leader LSU, Farmer remained in Lexington with a combination of a stomach virus and the flu. Teammates LaRon Ellis, Chris Mills, and Derrick Miller had also been ill, but all recovered in time to make the trip. Farmer shot just 2 of 14 in limited minutes in the month of February. In Kentucky's final home game of the season, Farmer hit a three-pointer – his only points of the game – with two seconds left to lift the Wildcats to a 70–69 win over Ole Miss. The following game, Farmer missed a potentially game-winning 15 feet (4.6 m) jump shot at the buzzer in a 68–67 loss at Mississippi State to end the Wildcats' regular season. In its first game of the Southeastern Conference Tournament the next week, Kentucky lost to Vanderbilt 77–63 in a game where Farmer missed all four of his field goal attempts. Finishing with a 13–19 record – the team's worst record since the 1926–27 season – the Wildcats were not invited to any postseason tournament. At the team's annual postseason awards banquet, Farmer received the free throw award.

=== Sophomore ===
Between Farmer's freshman and second years, the NCAA banned Eric Manuel from playing in any further NCAA games because of questions about the legitimacy of his ACT scores and levied a two-year postseason ban, a one-year ban on televised games, and scholarship reductions against Kentucky as punishment for payments allegedly made to the father of Chris Mills. Mills was ruled ineligible to play at Kentucky and transferred to Arizona; Sean Sutton and LaRon Ellis also transferred to other schools in the wake of the sanctions. Eddie Sutton resigned and was replaced by New York Knicks head coach Rick Pitino. After recruit Henry Thomas suffered an off-season injury to his anterior cruciate ligament, Kentucky was left with just 8 scholarship players, none of whom were taller than 6 ft 8 in (2.03 m).

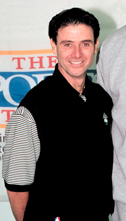
Rick Pitino replaced Eddie Sutton as Kentucky's coach in 1989.

Pitino and newly hired strength and conditioning coach Rock Oliver instituted an intensive conditioning program. The Lexington Herald-Leader noted that Farmer lost 12 pounds (5.4 kg) in the off-season, reducing his weight to 168 pounds (76 kg), and Pitino praised his improved speed and endurance. Pitino also brought Billy Donovan – who played point guard on Pitino's teams at Providence – to Kentucky as a graduate assistant to mentor the team's two-point guards, Farmer and Sean Woods (now academically eligible).

The team's first intra-squad scrimmage showcased Pitino's fast-paced, three-point-heavy style; the two teams combined to shoot 98-of-175 from the field, including 23-of-57 from three, as the Blue team defeated the White team 145–85. Farmer led the White team (the projected reserves) in scoring with 26 points, including 5-of-13 shooting from three-point range. In the next scrimmage, played at Farmer's alma mater, Clay County High School, Farmer scored 32 points, but the White team lost to the Blue team again, 125–117. The teams again combined for 175 shots, and Pitino said before the game that he wanted both teams to exceed 120 points. Farmer sat out much of the second half of the final scrimmage due to illness but scored 17 points on 5-of-16 shooting in a 124–120 victory for the White team.

After Kentucky's second game of the year – a 71–69 loss at Indiana – Pitino noted that Farmer, who had 4 points and 4 assists in the game, was benefiting from extra one-on-one coaching sessions with Donovan. In a December 19, 1989, victory against Furman, Farmer attempted 7 three-pointers – tied for second-most in the game – as the Wildcats set an NCAA record for most three-pointers attempted in a game with 47, besting their own record of 41 set earlier in the month against Tennessee Tech. A week later, Farmer set a career-high in points with 21 – including three made three-pointers – as the Wildcats set records for the most three-pointers made in a single game (21) and most points ever scored against North Carolina, but lost the game 121–110. After the game, Pitino opined that Farmer "holds back a little bit" and noted that he would expect Farmer to work hard in the off-season to reach his potential. The Wildcats closed out 1989 with a closer-than-expected 86–79 loss against eighth-ranked Louisville, but local sportswriter John McGill said Farmer had his best game to date with 10 points, 9 assists and 3 steals off the bench.

In a January 20, 1990, contest against conference foe Tennessee, Pitino benched senior shooting guard Derrick Miller to start the second half, giving his spot to Farmer. Farmer, who had no assists and 4 turnovers in nine minutes during the first half, responded with 7 assists and only one turnover in the second half. Miller, who entered the game with 17:38 left, scored 17 points in the second half as the Wildcats turned a 44–39 halftime deficit into a 95–83 win. Miller credited Pitino's decision to bring him off the bench in the second half with taking the pressure off him and helping him get more comfortable in the game. After a mid-week loss to Auburn, Pitino announced that he would move Farmer into the starting lineup, replacing Sean Woods, for the Wildcats' January 27 contest against Ole Miss. "We will change the lineup to try to get more concentration. We'll try Richie Farmer at the point and see what we get out of that. Right now we're not getting too much out of that position," Pitino told reporters during an SEC teleconference. In a 98–79 victory, Farmer tallied 11 points, 2 assists and no turnovers in 24 minutes; Woods registered 8 points, 4 assists, and 2 turnovers in 23 minutes off the bench. Pitino said practice performance would determine whether Woods or Farmer would start the Wildcats' next game against Mississippi State, and he ultimately decided to return Woods to the starting rotation.

On February 15, 1990, in front of a record 24,301 fans at Rupp Arena, Farmer hit six consecutive free throws to help Kentucky overcome a career-high 41 points by LSU's Chris Jackson and pull within a half-game of first place in the SEC with a 100–95 win. Farmer entered the game after Sean Woods fouled out with 1:54 left, and with Kentucky leading by two with just over a minute left, LSU coach Dale Brown instructed his team to foul Farmer on each Kentucky possession to conserve the game clock and regain possession of the ball. "We felt Farmer did not have much experience, and he was playing a little tight," Brown said after the game. Told of Brown's instructions to foul Farmer – the team's best free throw shooter at 86% – during a post-game interview, Pitino expressed surprise. "[Brown] said he purposely wanted to foul Richie Farmer? What was his reason? ... If I had to pick a guy to shoot it in front of 50,000 people with your life at stake, it's going to be Richie Farmer shooting that free throw."

Less than two minutes into a subsequent game at Alabama, Farmer and walk-on Tony Cooper both left the bench when Kentucky's Reggie Hanson and Alabama's Robert Horry engaged in a fist-fight. Hansen, Horry and Cooper were all ejected, but Farmer was not. Asked about the difference in penalties for Cooper and Farmer, official Don Ferguson admitted he did not want to hurt Kentucky's shallow rotation any further by ejecting another regular contributor. As a token of appreciation to the fans, after the Wildcats' February 24 "Senior day" win over Auburn, Pitino called his players back onto the floor and presented the individual awards usually reserved for the team's annual awards banquet. Farmer received the "Best Free Throw Shooter" award. For the season, he averaged 7.0 points per game. Fans and the media nicknamed the team "Pitino's Bombinos" for their fast-paced offense that relied heavily on the three-point shot, which contrasted sharply with the more deliberate offensive schemes run by Pitino's immediate predecessors, Joe B. Hall and Eddie Sutton.

=== Junior ===
In September 1990, Farmer had a disagreement with strength coach Rock Oliver, returned home to Manchester, and considered leaving the Kentucky basketball team. Pitino, who was away from campus on a recruiting visit, called Farmer and scheduled a meeting with him for the following weekend, after which Farmer decided to return to the team. Pitino characterized the incident as "a case of someone getting down and needing a couple of hugs to get their spirits lifted a little bit". Pitino later added that he thought the transfer of point guard Travis Ford from Missouri – bringing additional competition in the backcourt for the 1991–92 season – may have played into Farmer's brief departure.

Pitino expressed uncertainty entering the season about who would replace Derrick Miller as the team's starting shooting guard. Farmer was the leading candidate until suffering a bruised kidney during a public intra-squad scrimmage in early November and reaggravating the injury during another public scrimmage days later. Sophomore Jeff Brassow got the start for the Wildcats in their season opening win against Penn. Farmer scored 12 points off the bench – one of six Wildcats with double-digit points – but left the game with 3:17 remaining after taking an inadvertent elbow in the back. In the next game against Cincinnati, Farmer briefly replaced starter Sean Woods at point guard after Woods committed eight turnovers in the first half, but Farmer fared little better, committing two turnovers and uncharacteristically missing two consecutive free throws. In the second half, after Woods picked up his fourth foul, Farmer entered the game and provided steady leadership to preserve a 75–71 win. In the Wildcats' third game of the year – a win over Notre Dame in the Big Four Classic – Farmer led the team in scoring with 19 points on 7-of-11 shooting; he added 4 assists and 2 steals against no turnovers in 23 minutes of play.

Prior to Kentucky's December 15 matchup against Chattanooga, Pitino publicly contemplated starting Farmer in place of Sean Woods at point and either Carlos Toomer or Jody Thompson at shooting guard instead of Brassow. The day of the game, he announced Farmer would make the second start of his career at shooting guard alongside Woods at point. Although he tied with Pelphrey for a team-high 17 points, Farmer returned to the bench for the following game against Indiana because Pitino felt he didn't have the size to defend the Hoosiers' bigger guards.

In a December 22, 1990, win against in-state rival Western Kentucky, Farmer posted a new career high with 22 points, despite missing his first five three-point attempts of the game. He would not approach such scoring numbers again until a February 3, 1991, contest against Georgia, when he scored 16 points after seeing extended minutes due to Woods being in foul trouble. Farmer suffered a black eye during the game, which was notable for its physicality. Messenger-Inquirer sportswriter Jake Jennings also noted that Farmer relied on drives to the basket to score, as opposed to his usual penchant for shooting three-point shots.

Before Kentucky's February 13 game against Tennessee, Woods was hospitalized with an "acute viral illness". Farmer started in his place, tallying 14 points and 7 rebounds in an 85–74 win. Although Farmer also started the next game against Ole Miss, just 48 seconds into the game his knee made contact with an opponent's knee, sending him to the locker room and Woods into the game. Farmer returned to score a team-high 21 points, but also suffered a scratched eye, in a win that gave Kentucky the best record in the SEC; Woods logged 9 points and 7 assists in almost 24 minutes of action off the bench. Woods returned to the starting lineup in Kentucky's next game at Vanderbilt, but Farmer remained a starter as well, replacing Jeff Brassow at shooting guard. He scored 13 of his team-high 19 in the first half, but Kentucky lost the game 98–87. Pitino characterized Farmer as "exhausted" in the second half, playing heavy minutes in relief of Woods, who managed only 15 minutes before fouling out. Two games later, Farmer hit four of his first five shots – including three 3-pointers – and finished with a team-high 16 in a win against Alabama. Farmer notched 20 points – one behind team leader Jamal Mashburn – in Kentucky's final game of the season, a 114–93 win over Auburn. The win pushed Kentucky to a conference-best 14–4 record, but an SEC rule forbade declaring a team the regular season champion if they were ineligible for postseason play, as Kentucky was.

Farmer was one of five players to average double-digit points per game (10.1); it was the first time since Kentucky's 1977–78 championship team that so many players had averaged double-digit scoring. At the team's postseason awards banquet, Farmer received the Free Throw Award for the third straight year and was also named the team's Most Improved Player. Pitino named the four rising seniors – Farmer, Pelphrey, Woods, and Feldhaus – co-captains for the upcoming season.

=== Senior ===
Shortly after the team's first practice in October 1991, Pitino again commented on Farmer's improved conditioning, calling it his "biggest surprise" of the early practices. He also announced that seniors Sean Woods and John Pelphrey would join Jamal Mashburn in the starting lineup – as the team's point guard, small forward, and power forward, respectively – while senior Deron Feldhaus would reprise his "sixth man" role from the previous season. Farmer was projected to compete with junior college transfer Dale Brown for the starting shooting guard spot. At the team's annual Midnight Madness scrimmage, Farmer joined the announced starters and sophomore Gimel Martinez on the Blue team, which defeated the White team 67–54. Farmer had 18 points, including 4 of 6 made three-point baskets. Forbidden from holding off-campus scrimmages by new NCAA regulations, Kentucky played its only public preseason scrimmage in Memorial Coliseum; Farmer joined the White team, scoring 21 points on 6-of-12 shooting in a losing effort.

Suffering from the flu, Farmer did not play in the Wildcats' season-opening win against West Virginia in the Preseason NIT. He played in the following game, but missed all seven of his shots as Kentucky was eliminated from the tournament by Pitt 85–67, the team's worst home loss since 1988. Farmer came off the bench in the Wildcats' next game – a 90–69 win over UMass – but matched his career-high with 22 points, including a perfect 10-of-10 from the free throw line; he saw extended minutes in the game due to a season-ending knee injury to Jeff Brassow. UMass coach John Calipari called Farmer "the difference in the game".

During the non-conference season, Farmer made notable plays late in important games, including a game-clinching rebound against Indiana and a key three-pointer in the waning minutes of a game against Ohio. In a January 2, 1992, game against Notre Dame, Farmer entered the game after just three minutes when starter Dale Brown sprained his ankle. In the first half, he equaled his career high of 22 points – including five three-point baskets – en route to a new career-high of 28 in a 91–70 victory. This performance notwithstanding, complaints from the fan base about Farmer's lack of playing time – he averaged 17.7 minutes per game through early February – grew louder and eventually became the subject of media interest. In January, two of Kentucky's smaller newspapers printed articles on the subject – one speculating that Pitino was intentionally holding Farmer back so Farmer's popularity wouldn't eclipse his own. Kentucky beat writer Jerry Tipton addressed the topic at length in a Lexington Herald-Leader column on February 8, drawing a rebuke from Pitino, who called the issue a "non-story".

In late January, shortly before the Tipton article appeared, Pitino decided to start Farmer against Ole Miss. He believed starting Woods and bringing Brown off the bench would allow him to have one of his two best defenders on the floor more often; he also believed Farmer's height would not be a liability against Ole Miss' smaller starting guards. Farmer scored 10 points on 4-of-10 shooting and led the team with 6 rebounds in a 96–78 victory. Pitino then decided to start Farmer and fellow reserve Deron Feldhaus in Kentucky's next game against LSU, hoping to draw Tigers center Shaquille O'Neal farther from the basket by starting better shooters. The strategy was not successful – Farmer shot 2-of-9 and Feldhaus 1-of-10 in a 74–53 loss – but Pitino announced that Farmer would continue to start because he was exhibiting more shooting confidence than Kentucky's other guards. Farmer responded with 16 points, including four 3-pointers, in an 85–67 victory over Auburn. He continued to start for the Wildcats for the rest of the regular season, culminating in a Senior day win against Tennessee, when he scored 11 of Kentucky's first 16 points and saw extended minutes after fellow senior Sean Woods was ejected for fighting with the Volunteers' Jay Price.

With the team's probation over, Farmer and the other three seniors played in their first – and only – postseason games in the 1991–92 season. After an opening round win against Vanderbilt in the SEC Tournament in Birmingham, Alabama, Kentucky won its third meeting of the season with LSU 80–74 in the second round; the Tigers were without star center Shaquille O'Neal, who was suspended for fighting with Tennessee's Carlus Groves in his team's opening round victory. In the finals, Kentucky faced three-time defending tournament champion Alabama, which was without forward Andre Perry, who suffered a broken foot in the semi-finals against Arkansas. Star sophomore Jamal Mashburn led all scorers with 28 points on 12-of-14 shooting, en route to an 80–54 victory and tournament Most Valuable Player honors. Mashburn, who shot 26-for-31 in the Wildcats' three tournament games, said of his performance, "At the beginning of the season, I told the four seniors 'this is the only thing I can give you. I can't give you any presents, but I can give you an SEC championship. We gave them a present they really deserved."

Kentucky was seeded second in the East Region of the 1992 NCAA Tournament. The Wildcats held a narrow 62–59 lead with 8:25 to play in their first round matchup against Colonial Athletic Association champion Old Dominion when Farmer hit a layup that keyed a decisive four-and-a-half-minute, 15–2 run, helping Kentucky to an 88–69 victory. Kentucky's next game, against Iowa State, was decided at the free throw line. Kentucky was called for 29 fouls in the game, and Iowa State hit 34-of-38 free throws, but in the final 1:27 of the game, Kentucky shot 14 free throws – making 11 – to win the game 106–98. Farmer, who finished with 14 points, hit four consecutive free throws in the final minute of the game. After the game, Pitino commented, "If not for Richie Farmer, we don't win the game." In the regional semi-finals, the Wildcats faced a rematch with third-seeded UMass. After the Minutemen cut a 20-point Kentucky lead to 2 with almost six minutes remaining in the game, UMass coach John Calipari was whistled for a technical foul for leaving the coach's box while arguing that one of his players had been fouled on a loose ball rebound; Farmer, who finished with 7 points, made the resulting free throws, starting an 11–2 run that helped Kentucky to an 87–77 win.

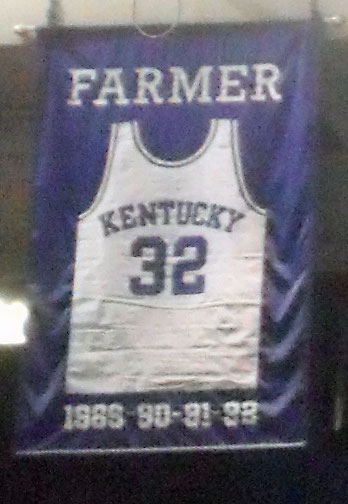
Farmer's jersey hangs in the rafters at Rupp Arena.

In the regional finals, Kentucky trailed top-seeded Duke by 12 in the second half, but battled back to force overtime. With 2.1 seconds left in overtime, Sean Woods hit a running bank shot to put Kentucky up one. Then, Duke's Christian Laettner caught a long inbounds pass, faked right, and hit a shot at the buzzer to give Duke the 104–103 victory. The game, which ended Farmer's playing career, is widely regarded as one of the greatest college basketball games of all time. Duke coach Mike Krzyzewski later recalled, "The thing I'll always remember about that game is Richie Farmer's face as the ball went in. That, to me, helped me to have a better understanding of that game. ... To me, that was the deepest emotion that was on the court, the emotion that was on Richie Farmer's face." Describing the impact of the game, Jerry Tipton wrote, "On one fateful night, the Cats obliterated any lingering association with $1,000 packages and academic fraud. Alluring images of courage, honest effort and heartracing excitement became symbols of UK basketball." Local media gave the seniors the nickname "The Unforgettables". Collectively, they were voted as the Lexington Herald-Leader's 1992 Sportsmen of the Year.

At the team's annual awards night, Farmer won the award for fewest turnovers per minute played (32 in 705 minutes), but the free throw award – won by Farmer the previous three years – went to Gimel Martinez. Athletics director C. M. Newton surprised the four seniors by hanging their jerseys in the rafters at Rupp Arena. In so doing, he violated the standards for the honor set by former athletics director Cliff Hagan. Those guidelines held that honorees must have completed a degree from the university and be at least 10 years removed from the end of their athletic eligibility. Newton cited the seniors' "unusual and outstanding contributions" to the program as reasons to make an exception to the standards, adding, "I won't say there never will be another exception, but the likelihood of another is not great." Sportscaster Cris Collinsworth protested Newton's action because it honored the seniors before other program standouts like Kyle Macy and Rick Robey.

After the season, the four seniors participated in a 21-city barnstorming tour of the state, playing against a group of local players in each city. At the game in Farmer's hometown of Manchester, Farmer scored 107 points for the seniors' team before switching to the Clay County team for the remainder of the game, hitting an additional three-pointer for a total of 30. Pelphrey hit a three to give the seniors – without Farmer – a 179–176 lead with 25 seconds left in the game, and the three seniors triple-teamed Farmer to prevent him from getting a shot off to tie the game. Twenty percent of the proceeds from each game benefited local charities, and another twenty percent of the total proceeds from the tour was divided between the University of Kentucky Library Fund, Big Brothers Big Sisters, and AIDS Volunteers of Lexington.

== Post-playing career ==
In August 1992, Antex Publishing of Lexington released Farmer's autobiography entitled Richie. In addition to the standard printing, the publisher offered a special edition of the book in which direct quotes from Farmer were rendered in blue type, similar to the words of Jesus in red letter editions of the Bible. Long-time Wildcats radio broadcaster Cawood Ledford wrote the book's foreword. By the end of October, the book had sold 30,000 copies, and a second printing from the publisher was ordered. Farmer participated in several book signings across the state, as well as filming television advertisements for local products and conducting speaking engagements for dental insurance provider Delta Dental to promote good oral health in his native eastern Kentucky.

Farmer continued taking classes at Kentucky with support from the Cawood Ledford Scholarship fund – designated to help University of Kentucky athletes who have exhausted their athletic eligibility finish their degrees – and in 1995, earned a Bachelor of Science degree with a double major in agricultural economics and agribusiness management. After graduation, he briefly worked in sports marketing in Lexington before returning to Manchester to join his father in the insurance business. In addition to selling insurance, Farmer also got his securities license to sell annuities, and eventually rose to become vice-president of Kentucky Financial Group.

== Personal life ==
On April 15, 1998, Farmer married Rebecca Ann Morgan. The couple had three sons – Richard III ("Trey") and Ryan, born on November 30 in 1996 and 1998, respectively, and Tate, born in 2001. They divorced in 2015.

== Honors ==
Farmer was inducted into the KHSAA Hall of Fame in 1998 and the Kentucky Athletic Hall of Fame in 2002. He was one of 88 inaugural members of the University of Kentucky Athletics Hall of Fame in 2005 and one of 16 inaugural members of the Kentucky High School Basketball Hall of Fame in 2012. "The Unforgettables" were honored on a limited edition collector's bottle of Maker's Mark bourbon in 2007.

== Political career ==
=== First term as Commissioner of Agriculture ===
On January 28, 2003, Farmer announced he would seek the Republican nomination for Kentucky Agriculture Commissioner. In his announcement, he acknowledged that he had never operated a farm, but noted that he knew many farmers and held a degree in an agriculture-related field. Ellen Williams, chair of the state's Republican Party, said Farmer's candidacy would bring "star quality" to a down-ballot race (i.e. state offices other than governor and lieutenant governor). No Republican had been elected to any of those offices since 1967.

Farmer waited until three weeks before the primary election to begin seriously campaigning and focused on population centers such as Lexington, Louisville, Bowling Green, and the Northern Kentucky area, where Republican voters were more concentrated. At that time, campaign finance reports showed that Farmer had spent about half of the $36,055 raised for his campaign, while his opponent, Leonard "Buck" Beasley, had raised only $450 and spent nothing. While he proposed no major changes to the operation of the agriculture department, Farmer emphasized teamwork as a means to improve the state's agricultural sector, cited the need to find new markets for Kentucky agricultural products, and expressed a desire to improve the public perception of the agriculture industry, saying "Farmers have a great story to tell, and I will use any name recognition I have gained through my experience with UK basketball to help them tell it." He also raised the possibility of engaging other former basketball players to promote the work of the agriculture department and indicated that he would lobby to have half of Kentucky's allocation of the Tobacco Master Settlement Agreement directed to the state's Agriculture Development Board.

With 109,742 votes – 79 percent of the total cast – Farmer garnered more votes than any other Republican candidate for any office on the ballot en route to winning the nomination. The victory set up a general election contest against Democratic nominee Alice Woods Baesler, a state agriculture department aide and wife of former Congressman and Kentucky basketball player Scotty Baesler. Bolstered by his significantly higher name recognition, Farmer led an early July SurveyUSA poll 61% to 33% over Baesler. Baesler charged that Farmer was unqualified for the job of agriculture commissioner and that his high poll numbers and convincing primary victory were driven by his popularity as a basketball player, criticizing him for featuring his status as a member of "The Unforgettables" in his campaign literature. Farmer responded that his college degree qualified him to be agriculture commissioner and said his need to continue his day job to support his family often kept him away from the campaign trail where he could expound more on his ideas for running the Department of Agriculture.

At an August debate in Owensboro, Farmer proposed the cross-promotion of Kentucky agricultural products and the state park system, awarding points for buying Kentucky produced groceries that could be redeemed for souvenirs and perks during stays at state parks. On October 21, The Kentucky Post gave Baesler its endorsement, contrasting her experience running a farm and her involvement with the agriculture department to Farmer's lack of agriculture experience and frequent absence at campaign events. Later that week, the Lexington Herald-Leader also endorsed Baesler, and followed up the next day with an article noting that, as of October 3, nearly one-third of the $87,825.20 Farmer had spent during the campaign went to relatives – including his parents, brother, sister, and in-laws – for salaries and campaign-related reimbursements. Interviewed by phone, Farmer responded, "[My family has] probably worked 60, 70, 80 hours a week campaigning for me trying to get me elected. I don't think we have done anything wrong." Richard Beliles, chairman of campaign finance watchdog Common Cause of Kentucky, said Farmer's actions were not illegal but were "rather odd". Farmer overcame the bad press, however, to take the election by a vote of 575,049 to 466,321.

In April 2004, Farmer announced the formation of a committee to study the effectiveness of state owned and operated farmer's markets. In June 2005, he was elected secretary of the Southern Association of State Departments of Agriculture; in 2007, he was elected president of the organization. Farmer also sought to prevent an outbreak of vesicular stomatitis virus in the state's horses and cattle by banning the import of animals from 20 western counties where the virus was known to have infected animals. On Farmer's advice, Governor Ernie Fletcher requested that the United States Department of Agriculture designate Kentucky as an agricultural disaster area after an April 2007 cold snap devastated the state's fruit and wheat crops; the designation made Kentucky farmers eligible for low-interest federal loans to help compensate for their lost crop revenue.

In December 2004, Kentucky's Registry of Election Finance, the agency that enforces the state's campaign finance laws, hired Farmer's sister, Rhonda F. Gray, who had previously served as chair of her brother's campaign for agriculture commissioner. Registry chair John Rogers maintained that Gray was hired on her own merits, and Gray promised to recuse herself from any work that might involve her brother's future campaigns. The following May, The Kentucky Post published excerpts from an email from Dick Murgatroyd, Fletcher's deputy chief of staff, to Transportation Cabinet officials asking them to find a job for Farmer's brother-in-law, Jamie Gray; the email indicated that Murgatroyd was responsible for finding jobs for both James and Rhonda Gray. Gray was later hired as an administrative specialist in the Transportation Cabinet. Farmer denied any involvement in the hiring decisions beyond submitting recommendations for both candidates. In July, Murgatroyd was indicted on 19 counts of violating the state's merit system by making politically motivated hires, including that of Jamie Gray. A transportation official testified in September that Farmer had declined one job for Gray because the salary was too low and had negotiated a higher salary on the job Gray eventually got. Farmer called the claims "ludicrous" and "simply not true".

=== Second term as Commissioner of Agriculture ===
Following the resignation of Lieutenant Governor Steve Pence in June 2006, Farmer was mentioned as a possible running mate for Fletcher in his upcoming re-election campaign, but Fletcher chose Robbie Rudolph instead, and Farmer announced his intent to seek re-election as agriculture commissioner. In the Republican primary, Farmer faced Don Stosberg, a former budget analyst for Kentucky's Legislative Research Commission. Again, Farmer was criticized for failing to appear at several campaign events; Stosberg told the Lexington Herald-Leader, "[Farmer is] famous for three things: shooting three-point shots, not returning phone calls and not showing up." Farmer responded that he was carrying out the duties of his office during his absences from the events. Farmer countered his absences by outspending his opponent 35-to-1, investing a reported $102,000 in his campaign. Farmer captured 85% of the vote, defeating Stosberg by a vote of 155,576 to 26,897. Name recognition played a role in both parties' primaries: Farmer enjoyed high name recognition from his days as a basketball player, while the Democratic nominee, David Lynn Williams, had a name similar to that of Kentucky Senate President David L. Williams.

Shortly after the primary election, Williams made a series of politically unsavvy remarks in an interview published by a weekly online magazine devoted to Kentucky agricultural issues; among the gaffes were calling the state agricultural development board and long-time Kentucky Democratic Senator Wendell H. Ford "a bunch of damn liars". State Democratic chairman Jonathan Miller called Williams' statements "offensive" and said that several of the party's executive committee members desired to have Williams removed as the party's candidate.

In June, Williams was arrested on misdemeanor charges of menacing, disorderly conduct, and harassment for allegedly threatening his niece, who was the city clerk of Glasgow, Kentucky, because she did not produce records he had requested under Kentucky's open records law. His trial was not scheduled until after the election.

By October, a Research 2000 poll showed Farmer leading the race 54–35%, with 11% undecided, and campaign finance documents showed that Farmer had spent $57,075 of the $168,650 he raised for his general election campaign, while Williams had raised and spent less than $1,000. The Lexington Herald-Leader made no endorsement in the race, stating that Farmer's lack of knowledge was obvious during his first term, but that he "looks like a farm-policy genius" compared to Williams. On election day, Farmer set a record for the most votes received in an election for a constitutional office in Kentucky, garnering 641,789 (64%) to Williams' 363,188 (36%). During his victory speech, Farmer denied rumors that he was considering switching his affiliation to the Democratic Party.

Farmer asked U.S. Agriculture Secretary Tom Vilsack for declarations of agricultural disasters in the wake of an ice storm in January 2009 that endangered the state's livestock and flooding that affected Kentucky Lake in 2010, damaging large portions of the state's corn, soybean, and wheat crops. In December 2010, he launched a joint investigation with Democratic Attorney General Jack Conway into claims that the Eastern Livestock company had not paid Kentucky cattlemen for $130 million in livestock.

=== Bid for lieutenant governor ===
Farmer was limited to two terms by the Kentucky Constitution, and in October 2009, the Lexington Herald-Leader reported that he was "in discussions" about running for governor in the 2011 election. In August 2010, Farmer announced that he would be "running for something" in the upcoming election and would announce his plans within weeks after the Kentucky State Fair. The Lexington Herald-Leader speculated that Farmer could run for governor, secretary of state, or lieutenant governor on a ticket with Senate President David Williams. On September 1, 2010, Williams and Farmer announced that they would run as a ticket for governor and lieutenant governor, respectively.

Shortly after the announcement, Farmer began to face criticism for his use of state funds during difficult economic times that resulted in austerity measures in most state government agencies. One such criticism involved the attendance of Farmer and three aides at the Southern Association of State Departments of Agriculture's 2010 annual meeting in St. Croix at a cost of $10,000. Another involved the approval of merit raises for eleven agriculture department employees in 2010 when workers in all other state government agencies received no cost of living salary increases and were required to take six unpaid furlough days. A department spokesman said the employees had taken on responsibilities for multiple jobs left unfilled by attrition. "The thought process was that this was more cost-effective than hiring new people," the spokesman said. Every constitutional officer in the state also donated a day's salary to the state treasury or to a charity on each of the mandatory furlough days, but Farmer refused, saying he opposed the entire concept of furlough days for government workers. After significant public criticism, Farmer apologized and decided to donate six days' worth of his salary to charity.

Farmer was also criticized for his management of the agriculture department's vehicle fleet. Late in his first term, Farmer had removed the vehicles used by the Agriculture Department from the state fleet, opting to have department officials manage them separately. In 2010, the Bluegrass Institute for Public Policy Solutions, a free market think tank, criticized the department's management of the vehicles under its control, citing the frequency with which the department's vehicles were being replaced. The Lexington Herald-Leader noted in 2010 that the department's fleet had grown from 178 to 206 vehicles since 2007 while the state's fleet had shrunk by 5%, and that all but three of the department's vehicles were fewer than four years old. A department spokesman defended the moves, citing decreased maintenance costs and higher resale values of vehicles being replaced. The Lexington Herald-Leader noted that such incidents could undermine Williams and Farmer's traditional Republican message of the need for less government spending.

Farmer's wife Rebecca filed for divorce on April 5, 2011, claiming in court documents that she had no access to the family's finances except the salary she earned as a teacher's aide. On April 12, Farmer petitioned the court to dismiss his wife's divorce petition, contesting the idea that their marriage was irretrievably broken. The divorce proceedings were put on hold by mutual consent on May 26, 2011, but in a July 12 hearing, Farmer's wife asked that the judge schedule a trial date; the judge ordered mediation within 30 days instead. The mediation failed, and a trial date was set for November 22, shortly after the gubernatorial election. A second round of mediation shortly before the scheduled hearing resulted in a settlement between the parties; terms of the settlement were kept private.

In the Republican gubernatorial primary, the Williams-Farmer ticket defeated businessman Phil Moffett and former Jefferson County Judge/Executive Bobbie Holsclaw. Williams and Farmer had led in opinion polling throughout the entire campaign, and neither opposing slate was able to raise enough money to engage in statewide television advertising; despite this, Williams and Farmer received only 68,502 votes, 48.2% of those cast. Holsclaw won the voting in her home county of Jefferson, which contains the city of Louisville and is the state's most populous. Moffett, a Tea Party favorite, carried the second most populous county, Fayette (which contains Lexington), as well as heavily populated Daviess, McCracken, and Warren counties, and several counties in Northern and Central Kentucky.

Questions about Farmer's use of taxpayer funds continued to dog him throughout the general election campaign. Democrats demanded that Farmer reimburse the state for hotel expenses charged to the state while Farmer was conducting outreach activities at the KHSAA state basketball tournament and the Kentucky State Fair, both located fewer than 60 miles (97 km) from his home. In May, the office of Democratic State Auditor Crit Luallen notified the Internal Revenue Service that Farmer had failed to report personal use of his state vehicle as income. A spokesman for Farmer's office said that the personal mileage had been tracked, but a department employee had failed to forward it to the state Personnel Cabinet for reporting; he added that Farmer would file amended tax documents and have deductions taken from his wages to settle the tax liability. The state Democratic Party filed an ethics complaint against Farmer in September based on an anonymous email sent to the Personnel Cabinet claiming that, after work hours, Farmer directed an agriculture department employee to purchase a small refrigerator with state funds and deliver it to Farmer's house. A department spokesman said Farmer spent a substantial amount of time working from a home office in 2010 due to a back injury and that the refrigerator had been moved to department offices in 2011.

Beshear and Abramson easily defeated Farmer and Williams, carrying 90 of Kentucky's 120 counties. Days later, the Lexington Herald-Leader reported that Farmer had placed his girlfriend in a non-merit agriculture department job on October 31, 2011. Williams confirmed that the woman was Farmer's girlfriend, but denied knowledge that she had been put on the state payroll. Farmer defended the hiring, saying his girlfriend was qualified for the job, which involved administrative and clerical tasks, and that his legal team had assured him that he had followed all appropriate hiring regulations. Farmer's successor, Republican James Comer, fired Farmer's girlfriend a day after being sworn into office.

== Post-political life ==
=== Investigations ===
Five days after Farmer left office, Comer announced that he had requested a full audit of the department by newly elected Democratic State Auditor Adam Edelen. Among the items Comer asked Edelen to investigate were 171 items of missing agriculture department property valued at about $334,000 and another 103 items worth about $146,000 that were supposed to be returned to the state as surplus but could not be accounted for. A week later, Farmer returned some of the missing items.

Comer and Edelen released the report on their joint probe on April 30, 2012. It detailed a "toxic culture of entitlement" in the agriculture department under Farmer, charging that he had required state employees to conduct personal errands while on the clock, failed to report gifts in excess of $200 as required by state ethics laws, and signed timesheets authorizing payment to friends in the department – including his girlfriend – who had performed very little if any work. Edelen confirmed that his investigation indicated that laws had been broken, and the report was turned over to the state attorney general for investigation. Minutes after the report was released, Farmer's lawyer made a public statement in which he opined, "I don't see anything in this audit report that any law-enforcement agency is going to be excited about." He conceded that Farmer had declined to be interviewed during the investigation but felt it was unfair that Farmer was not given a chance to review or comment on the final report prior to its release.

A week after the audit results were released, Kentucky's Executive Branch Ethics Commission reported that Farmer was the only constitutional officer who had failed to file a required disclosure of his 2011 finances by the required April 16 deadline. Farmer's attorney said the omission was "simply a matter of oversight on Richie's part given with [sic] what all has been going on." Days later, First National Bank of Manchester filed a foreclosure suit against Farmer, alleging that no payments had been made on his $300,000 home mortgage since January 2012. Under terms of his pending divorce, Farmer was solely responsible for the mortgage on the house. The divorce was finalized in July, and on September 24, 2012, the house was sold at auction after Farmer was not successful in selling it himself. Earlier that week, a judge denied Farmer's request to reduce his child support payments, which were based on his salary as agriculture commissioner. Farmer, who had not been employed since leaving office in January 2012, told the court that the investigation into his tenure as agriculture commissioner had made it difficult to find employment. The judge found that Farmer was "voluntarily underemployed", although he suspended the child support payments for the months of September and October 2012 in light of Farmer's recovery from an August 30 hip replacement surgery. On November 9, 2012, the Lexington Herald-Leader reported that Farmer had found employment at a car dealership in Manchester.

=== Charges filed ===
On March 18, 2013, the Kentucky Executive Branch Ethics Commission charged Farmer with 42 state ethics violations, the most ever registered against a single individual; the previous high was 16. Most of the charges against him stemmed from the previous year's auditor's report, but previously unreported charges included conspiring with his sister Rhonda, who was also charged, to falsify records submitted to Rhonda's employer, the Registry of Election Finance. Farmer's girlfriend was also charged for falsifying timesheets. These charges were followed by five indictments by a federal grand jury on April 19, 2013, alleging four counts of converting state funds and property to personal use and one count of soliciting a bribe in exchange for a state grant. U.S. Attorney Kerry B. Harvey said a federal investigation revealed that Farmer had created jobs in the department for his friends and girlfriend, who conducted personal errands for Farmer – including "building a basketball court for Farmer, placing flooring in Farmer's attic and organizing Farmer's personal effects" – while on the clock. He also said that Farmer had kept some of the gifts ordered in conjunction with the 2008 Southern Association of State Departments of Agriculture conference for his own use and allowed his family to stay in hotel rooms reserved for agriculture department employees at the Kentucky State Fair. The indictment did not specify what bribe was sought in exchange for a grant to conduct an all-terrain vehicle safety class, but the charges from the state Ethics Commission mentioned that Farmer had received three all-terrain vehicles in exchange for awarding unspecified state grants. A Lexington Herald-Leader report noted that the indictment only included events from 2008 forward because the statute of limitations had expired for any actions prior to 2008.

Farmer pled not guilty to all five federal charges on April 25, 2013. He was released on his own recognizance, and his trial date was set for July 2. U.S. Magistrate Robert Wier denied Farmer's request to leave the country in May to celebrate his girlfriend's 40th birthday in Cancún, Mexico. Wier also ordered the recently unemployed Farmer to seek employment, surrender his passport, and remain within the state until the trial. In response to Farmer's lawyer's request to delay the trial until February 2014 – a request the prosecution called "excessive" – Judge Gregory Van Tatenhove rescheduled the trial for October 22.

=== Plea bargain and sentencing ===
On September 5, 2013, Farmer's attorney filed a motion to allow Farmer to change his plea to guilty and announced that Farmer had reached a plea bargain to settle all federal and state charges against him. Farmer would have faced maximum penalties of $250,000 and 10 years in prison for each federal charge against him. Instead, in exchange for his guilty plea, prosecutors agreed to pursue a sentence of 21 to 27 months in federal prison and $120,500 in restitution of the $450,000 Farmer was accused of misappropriating. Additionally, Farmer pleaded guilty to one state charge of violating campaign finance laws in exchange for a sentence of no more than one year, served concurrently with his federal sentence. Finally, Farmer acknowledged to the Executive Branch Ethics Commission 35 of the 42 violations he had been charged with, resulting in $65,000 in fines, the most ever levied by the commission. Farmer's attorney indicated that U.S. Attorney Kerry Harvey and Kentucky Attorney General Jack Conway had been pursuing additional indictments against Farmer when the plea bargain was reached. Although still restricted from leaving the state, Farmer was allowed to remain free pending sentencing.

Van Tatenhove sentenced Farmer to 27 months in federal prison on January 14, 2014. He recommended that the sentence be served at the Federal Correctional Institution in Manchester, Farmer's hometown, but the Federal Bureau of Prisons opted to assign him to the United States Penitentiary, Hazelton near Bruceton Mills, West Virginia. The Lexington Herald-Leader noted that Farmer's inmate number, 16226-032, was reminiscent of his college jersey number, 32.

Originally scheduled to report to prison on March 18, Farmer was granted a one-week delay by Van Tatenhove to watch his son, Trey, play for Clay County High School in the KHSAA basketball tournament. Clay County lost that game to Covington Catholic High School 80–78 in the first round of the tournament. Van Tatenhove insisted that he granted the delay in deference to the Farmer family, not as a special favor for Farmer himself. On March 25, 2014, Farmer reported to the satellite camp of the Hazelton prison to begin serving his sentence. He was imprisoned for almost 20 months, transitioned to a halfway house in Lexington on December 18, 2015, and was released on January 21, 2016.

In May 2016, Farmer filed for Chapter 7 bankruptcy. His petition stated that he was unemployed and owed $385,745 in debts – including $120,000 in restitution to the state and $15,000 in child support that are ineligible for bankruptcy forgiveness – against $24,259 in assets. He was reportedly renting a home in Clay County from his parents and driving a car they owned. On March 22, 2018, Farmer was arrested in Laurel County, Kentucky, for driving under the influence.

Political offices
Preceded by Billy Ray Smith	Commissioner of Agriculture; 2004–2012	Succeeded by James Comer
Party political offices
Vacant Title last held by Willard Allen	Republican nominee for Agriculture Commissioner of Kentucky; 2003, 2007	Succeeded by James Comer
Preceded by Robbie Rudolph	Republican nominee for Lieutenant Governor of Kentucky; 2011	Succeeded by Jenean Hampton
