= 2011 Kentucky Attorney General election =

- November 8, 2011
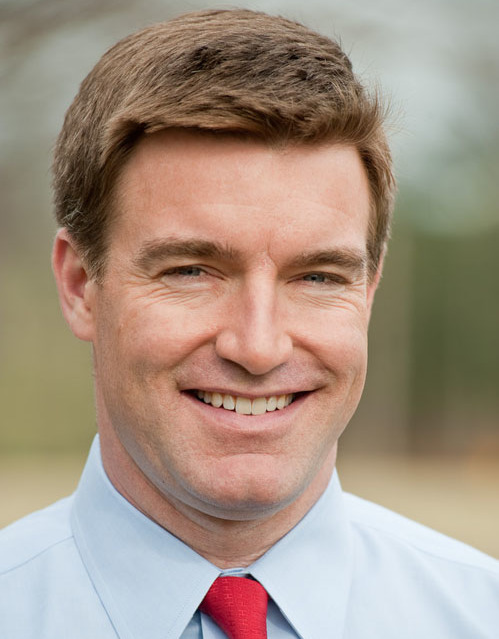

Nominee	Jack Conway	Todd P'Pool
Party	Democratic	Republican
Popular vote	449,638	367,661
Percentage	55.02%	44.98%
- County results Conway: 50–60% 60–70% 70–80% P'Pool: 50–60% 60–70% 70–80%
Attorney General before election
Jack Conway
Democratic
Elected Attorney General
Jack Conway
Democratic

The state of Kentucky elected an Attorney General on Tuesday, November 8, 2011. Primaries for this election was held on Tuesday, May 17, 2011. In the general election, incumbent Jack Conway defeated his challenger, Todd P'Pool.

== Background ==
Current Attorney General Jack Conway, of Louisville, a Democrat, ran for a second term. There was speculation that Conway would not seek a second term; he had won the Democratic nomination for U.S. Senate in the 2010 election (defeating Lieutenant Governor Daniel Mongiardo in the primary) but lost to Republican Rand Paul in the general election.

Several Democrats expressed interest in running if Conway decided to opt against a bid, including State Representative John C. Tilley of Hopkinsville, Louisville lawyer and former state Democratic Party Chairman Jennifer Moore, and state Senator Ray Jones II. However, Conway announced on January 21, 2011, that he would run for a second term and did not face an opponent in the primary.

On January 3, Hopkins County Attorney Todd P'Pool, of Madisonville announced his candidacy and stated that he would contribute $250,000 of his own money to help finance his run. He stated that if elected, he would fight the U.S. Environmental Protection Agency from imposing regulations on the coal industry and would have Kentucky join a lawsuit brought by a number of state attorneys general seeking to strike down the new health care reform law.

Secretary of State of Kentucky Trey Grayson (who lost the 2010 Republican nomination for U.S. Senate to Rand Paul) was thought to have considered entering the race for the Republican nomination, but he announced on November 24, 2010, that he would not seek election to any office in 2011.

Rob Sanders of Fort Mitchell, the Commonwealth's Attorney from Kenton County, announced on December 14 that he would not run for Attorney General and would instead seek re-election in 2012 to a second term as Commonwealth's Attorney. Republican Party of Kentucky Chairman Steve Robertson had urged Sanders to run, but noted the interest of Hopkins County Attorney Todd P'Pool, of Madisonville, and Jessamine County Attorney Brian Goettl. P'Pool filed paperwork to run the next day.

On January 13, 2011, former Kentucky Supreme Court Chief Justice Joseph E. Lambert, of Mount Vernon announced he was dropping his plans to seek the Republican nomination for attorney general because current chief justice John D. Minton, Jr. declined to grant him a leave of absence from the senior judge program.

Shortly afterward, Brian Goettl announced on the Jack Pattie radio show on AM 590-WVLK in Lexington that he also would not seek the Republican nomination for attorney general, leaving P'Pool the only Republican candidate in that race.

== Candidates ==
=== Republicans ===
- Todd P'Pool, Hopkins County Attorney

=== Democrats ===
- Jack Conway - incumbent Attorney General

== General election ==
=== Polling ===
Poll source	Date(s) administered	Sample size	Margin of error	Jack Conway (D)	Todd P'Pool (R)	Undecided
Public Policy Polling	August 25–28, 2011	600	± 4.0%	47%	36%	18%

=== Result ===
2011 Kentucky Attorney General election
Party	Candidate	Votes	%	±%
Democratic	Jack Conway (incumbent)	449,638	55.02%	
Republican	Todd P'Pool	367,661	44.98%	
Total votes		817,299	100%	N/A
Democratic hold				

== See also ==
- 2011 United States elections
