= Jonathan Miller (Kentucky politician) =

American politician (born 1967)

Secretary of the Kentucky Finance and Administration Cabinet
- In office 2007–2011
- Governor: Steve Beshear
- Preceded by: Mike Burnside
- Succeeded by: Lori Hudson Flanery

39th Kentucky State Treasurer
- In office January 3, 2000 – December 11, 2007
- Governor: Paul E. Patton; Ernie Fletcher
- Preceded by: John Kennedy Hamilton
- Succeeded by: Todd Hollenbach

Personal details
- Born: July 24, 1967 (age 59) Lexington, Kentucky
- Party: Democratic
- Occupation: Attorney

Jonathan S. Miller (born July 24, 1967) is an American author, attorney, and former politician from the Commonwealth of Kentucky who served as Secretary for the Kentucky Finance and Administration Cabinet from December 2007 to 2011. Prior to this appointment, Miller was elected statewide twice and served as Kentucky State Treasurer from 1999 to 2007, becoming the first Jew to be elected to statewide office in Kentucky history. He is a member of the Democratic Party. Miller currently is the Member-in-Charge of Frost Brown Todd in Lexington, KY, and serves as General Counsel to the U.S. Hemp Roundtable, where he has emerged as one of the leading attorneys for, and advocates of, the U.S. hemp industry.

== Biography ==
From Lexington, Miller graduated from Henry Clay High School and Harvard College and Law School. He is married to Lisa Miller, a mind-body health specialist, and the author of The Heart of Leadership for Women. They have two daughters, Emily and Abigail.

== Early political career ==
Miller began his career in politics while in college by serving as the national director of Students for Gore in 1988 when then-senator Al Gore was running for president. He later worked for Gore when he was Vice President in the Clinton Administration., as the Deputy Chief of Staff of the U.S. Department of Energy. He first campaigned for elected office in 1998, losing a primary bid for Kentucky's 6th congressional district to Ernesto Scorsone. In 1999 he was elected State Treasurer and was re-elected in 2003. Miller's signature accomplishment as Treasurer was the establishment of Kentucky's Prepaid Tuition Program, which signed up more than 10,000 families.

== Kentucky gubernatorial run ==
On December 14, 2006, Miller announced his intentions to run for Governor of Kentucky with Jefferson County Attorney Irv Maze as his running mate. On May 7, 2007, a campaign spokesperson announced that Miller would drop out of the race and endorse the campaign of Steve Beshear. The endorsement was seen as a significant milestone in the race, helping Beshear win the primary without a runoff, and ultimately, the general election.

=== Sideburns challenge ===
Raising a few eyebrows, a fundraising method for Miller's campaign was dubbed "The Great Sideburns Debate", which began due to an article by John David Dyche of the Louisville Courier-Journal that stated, "Treasurer Jonathan Miller sports perhaps the longest sideburns on a gubernatorial candidate since the Seventies ... the 1870s." Miller's campaign shot back calling it, "The lowest blow in political history", and saying Dyche 'hit' Miller, "where it hurts the most ... his sideburns". In response Miller's campaign invited donations of $18.70 and $19.70, for whichever era of sideburns the donor preferred.

=== Campaign finance disclosure ===
On February 23 the Miller-Maze campaign issued their campaign finance summary 90 days prior to the primary, and nearly two months prior to the mandated 32-day mark set for the first financial disclosure deadline for elections. This was in accordance with an earlier pledge to disclose finances at the 90 and 60-day mark and to strive for transparent governance.

=== Video blog ===
On March 2 Miller's campaign unveiled a video blog on their campaign website becoming the only campaign in the race to do so.

=== Dropping out ===
On May 7, 2007, Miller announced he was dropping out of the race for governor. Polls had consistently showed his name recognition had remained low and he was running well behind other candidates. Miller and his running mate held a press conference and endorsed the slate of Steve Beshear and Dan Mongiardo. Miller said, "The odds are if I stayed in the race that there was a real possibility that the Democratic primary could produce a nominee who was unelectable in the fall — a nominee whose baggage would be picked apart and exploited."

== Political views and advocacy ==
Miller set out some general issues he planned to take on if he had been elected governor.

=== Health care ===
The Miller-Maze campaign advocated incentives for use of biotechnology, especially in farm crops. They also advocated the use of e-health initiatives to assist in reducing medical mistakes and reducing unnecessary testing in hospitals by requiring a card carrying all patient information.

On March 5 Miller's campaign unveiled a plan to bring universal healthcare to Kentucky and heavily fund cancer research and treatment within his first term in recognition of Kentucky's high prevalence of cancer. Funding would have come through "expanded gaming, cost-savings realized through reforms, and cutting waste and abuse in the state's Medicaid system by streamlining bureaucracy.... Building coalitions of government agencies, private business, civic groups and faith-based programs will also be critical."

=== Environment ===
Miller stated he would make Kentucky the "clean energy capital of the world through the development of zero-emissions clean coal and bio-fuel technologies to harness energy from Kentucky agriculture and natural resources". He was also critical of Mountain top removal, a common and controversial coal-mining method in Eastern Kentucky, and had called for its reform. He has also advocated LEED certification for all future government buildings.

=== Education ===
Miller advocated a program entitled Cradle to College, which he has supported with Republican Secretary of State Trey Grayson. It was analogous to a savings bank account in which the state would make an investment, with the opportunity for relatives or outside companies to make contributions to specific students. It would have required the student to later pay back the state via community or military service.

=== Labor ===
On February 16, 2007, the Miller-Maze campaign sent a letter to major labor leaders lambasting legislators for 'stripping down' a major minimum wage bill reform, stating that Miller and Maze would have introduced a full minimum wage increase that would be implemented within the first 100 days of Miller's term.

== Finance and Administration Cabinet Secretary ==
On November 10, 2007, Governor-elect Steve Beshear appointed Miller to the position of Secretary for the Finance and Administration Cabinet. Miller stated he would resign as state treasurer as well as chair of the Kentucky Democratic Party when the appointment took effect. Miller stepped down from the position on March 11, 2011, after helping lead Administration efforts in government transparency, pension reform, and energy-efficient buildings, with Kentucky becoming the first state in the nation to establish a Green Bank, a revolving loan fund offering low-interest loans for energy efficiency projects at state buildings. Beshear said in a statement that Miller has been "an exceptional leader and a vital member of my Cabinet."

== Post-Political Career ==
=== The Recovering Politician ===
Upon leaving state government, Miller launched a political blog, The Recovering Politician, at which he and dozens of other former elected officials posted articles and opinion pieces. The Recovering Politician provided "a civilized forum as an antidote to our nation's toxic addiction to vitriol and demonization…a place for debating and discussing the issues of the day — politics, sports, pop culture, religion, you name it — without the finger-pointing and blame-assigning that's all too typical on the Web and among our more crass media." Contributors to the site included former Republican National Committee Chairman Michael Steele, political pundit Krystal Ball, former U.S. Congressman Artur Davis, and former Maryland Lt. Governor Kathleen Kennedy Townsend. The most popular post at the site was former Missouri State Senator Jeff Smith's "When J.T. Met Pork Chop…or Sex, Lies & Prison Love," in which Smith details his experiences serving in prison for a campaign finance violation. Smith's piece was featured in New York magazine's "Approval Matrix."

Miller also served as a Co-Founder of No Labels, a national organization advocating for bi-partisan solutions to national problems. In that role, Miller appeared on "The Daily Show with John Stewart," as well as multiple appearances on cable new programs on MSNBC, Fox and CNN.

Miller became a regular columnist for political and sports e-magazines, including The Daily Beast, the Huffington Post, and Kentucky Sports Radio. Miller used his platform to advocate for the removal of a statue of Jefferson Davis from Kentucky's Capitol Rotunda. He recommended that Davis be replaced by a tribute to Louisville native Muhammad Ali.

=== Poker ===
In 2012, Miller made the final table, finishing in 8th place, in a no-limit Texas hold 'em tournament in the World Series of Poker, featuring 4820 participants. In total, Miller has cashed in four WSOP tournaments, winning more than $80,000 in prize money.

=== Hemp ===
Upon leaving state government in 2011, Miller went into private legal practice at Frost Brown Todd, a major regional law firm with offices in nine states and more than 525 attorneys. On March 29, 2017, Miller was named Member-in-Charge of the law firm's Lexington, KY office.

In 2012, after publishing a column on cannabis reform, Miller was enlisted by Kentucky Commissioner James Comer in a successful bi-partisan effort to secure the legalization of hemp in the Bluegrass State. Miller went on to found and serve as General Counsel of the US Hemp Roundtable, which emerged as the industry's leading business advocacy group for the legalization of hemp and hemp products such as CBD. In that role, Miller was intimately involved in the drafting and passage of federal and state legislation that fully legalized hemp after decades of prohibition. Miller testified before the U.S. Food and Drug Administration's first public hearings on CBD, urging the agency to recognize and regulate the popular product. Miller also leads the Frost Brown Todd's hemp practice, advising clients on the full range of legal services for the industry.

Jonathan's work was recognized by the prestigious National Law Journal which named him to its inaugural class of “Trailblazers” among government relations professionals. Jonathan was subsequently honored as one of The Best Lawyers in for 2021.

== Books authored ==
Miller authored the book The Compassionate Community (ISBN 140397408X), which examines religious (particularly Judeo-Christian) values, and how they relate to politics. Former vice-president Al Gore wrote the foreword. The book received positive reviews from senators such as Evan Bayh and Joe Lieberman as well as many religious leaders, such as Tony Campolo. He also authored The Liberal Case for Israel and edited The Recovering Politician's Twelve Step Program to Survive Crisis.

Party political offices
Preceded by John Kennedy Hamilton	Democratic nominee for Kentucky State Treasurer; 1999, 2003	Succeeded by Todd Hollenbach
Political offices
Preceded by John Kennedy Hamilton	Treasurer of Kentucky; 1999–2007	Succeeded by Todd Hollenbach
