= Todd Hollenbach =

American politician

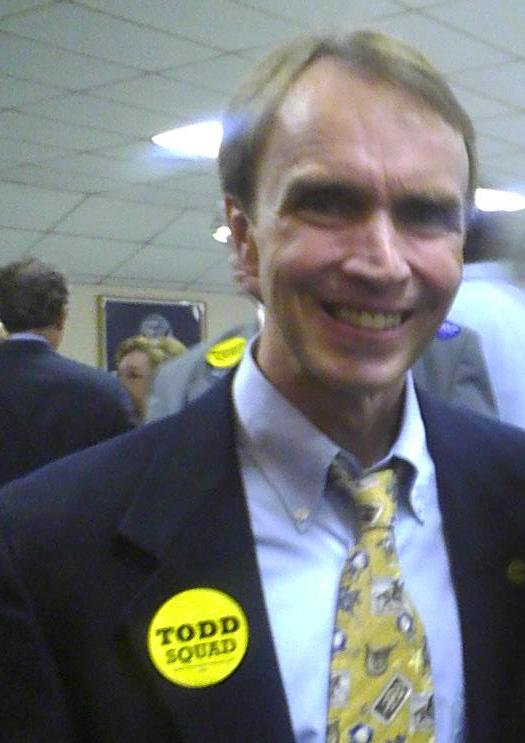

40th Kentucky State Treasurer
- In office January 7, 2008 – January 4, 2016; Acting: December 11, 2007 – January 7, 2008
- Governor: Steve Beshear; Matt Bevin
- Preceded by: Jonathan Miller
- Succeeded by: Allison Ball

Judge of the 30th Kentucky District Court
- In office January 4, 2016 – January 7, 2019
- Preceded by: Michele Stengel
- Succeeded by: Julie Kaelin

Personal details
- Born: July 21, 1960 (age 66) Jefferson County, Kentucky, U.S.
- Party: Democratic
- Spouse: Rosemarie Hollenbach
- Children: 2
- Education: University of Kentucky; University of Louisville

Louis J. Hollenbach, IV, known as Todd Hollenbach (born July 21, 1960), is an American former judge and politician who served as the 40th Kentucky State Treasurer. A Democrat, he was elected as treasurer in 2007 and re-elected in 2011. Because of term limits, Hollenbach was ineligible to run for a third term as treasurer in 2015 and instead won election to a vacant seat on the Jefferson County, Kentucky District Court in 2015.

== Education ==
Hollenbach received his Bachelor of Arts from the University of Kentucky at Lexington in 1982 and his Juris Doctor from University of Louisville School of Law in 1985. He is a graduate of Trinity High School, an all-male Catholic high school in Louisville, Kentucky.

== Early career ==
Hollenbach was an attorney in private practice from 1985 until his 2007 election as Treasurer. Hollenbach was also commissioner of the Kentucky Commission on Human Rights from 1999 to 2007. He was also a member of the bi-partisan Blue Ribbon Commission investigating the Merit Hiring System. In 2002, Hollenbach ran for the Louisville Metro Council, losing the Democratic primary to Tina Ward-Pugh. In 2004, he ran for an expired term on the Jefferson County District Court, losing to Anne Haynie.

== State Treasurer ==
Hollenbach won his initial election as treasurer against Melinda L. Wheeler in a landslide election in 2007 and took office as the 37th Treasurer in January 2008. In 2011, he successfully ran for a second term as treasurer against Republican K. C. Crosbie and Libertarian Ken Moellman. During the lead-up to the 2015 elections, he said that he might run for another office but did not immediately target which office.

== District Court Judge ==
In the 2015 general election, Hollenbach won election to a vacant seat on the Jefferson County District Court. Because the incumbent had resigned after the filing deadline for the primary election and had drawn no primary opposition, a total of twenty-one candidates contested the seat. Hollenbach won with just over 19 percent of the vote; the runner-up with 11.6 percent of the ballots cast was the Republican Bob Heleringer, a former state representative from Louisville. Runoff elections are not held in Kentucky in such cases; plurality prevails.

== Personal life ==
Hollenbach is married with two children and resides in Jefferson County. He is the son of Todd Hollenbach, III, a former Jefferson County Judge (1970–1977) who presided over the Jefferson County Fiscal Court. Since 1976, the position has been known as the County Judge Executive.

Party political offices
Preceded by Jonathan Miller	Democratic nominee for Kentucky State Treasurer; 2007, 2011	Succeeded by Rick Nelson
Political offices
Preceded by Jonathan Miller	Treasurer of Kentucky; 2007–2016	Succeeded by Allison Ball
