= Kentucky's 21st Senate district =

American legislative district

Kentucky's 21st State Senate district
Senator
| Brandon J. Storm; R–London |
since January 1, 2021
- Registration: 72.1% Republican; 20.3% Democratic; 7.0% No party preference
- Demographics: 94.5% White; 0.8% Black; 1.9% Hispanic; 0.3% Asian; 0.1% Native American; 0.1% Hawaiian/Pacific Islander; 0.3% Other; 2.1% Multiracial
- Population (2023): 119,241
- Registered voters (2025): 92,246

Kentucky's 21st Senatorial district is one of 38 districts in the Kentucky Senate. Located in the southern part of the state, it comprises the counties of Casey, Laurel, Lincoln, and Rockcastle. It has been represented by Brandon J. Storm (R–London) since 2021. As of 2023, the district had a population of 119,241.

== Voter registration ==
On January 1, 2025, the district had 92,246 registered voters, who were registered with the following parties.

| Party | Registration | |
| Party | Voters | % |
|---|---|---|
| Republican | 66,538 | 72.13 |
| Democratic | 18,766 | 20.34 |
| Independent | 3,160 | 3.43 |
| Libertarian | 344 | 0.37 |
| Constitution | 48 | 0.05 |
| Green | 39 | 0.04 |
| Socialist Workers | 7 | 0.01 |
| Reform | 5 | 0.01 |
| "Other" | 3,339 | 3.62 |
| Total | 92,246 | 100.00 |
Source: Kentucky State Board of Elections

== Election results from statewide races ==
=== 2014 – 2020 ===
| Year | Office | Results (Note: Figures presented in this table are calculated by summing precinct election results published by the Kentucky State Board of Elections, using precinct data that list each precinct's senatorial district.) |
|---|---|---|
| 2014 | Senator | McConnell 65.1 - 31.4% |
| 2015 | Governor | Bevin 67.4 - 29.1% |
| 2015 | Secretary of State | Knipper 60.7 - 39.3% |
| 2015 | Attorney General | Westerfield 65.3 - 34.7% |
| 2015 | Auditor of Public Accounts | Harmon 66.2 - 33.8% |
| 2015 | State Treasurer | Ball 72.9 - 27.1% |
| 2015 | Commissioner of Agriculture | Quarles 72.1 - 27.9% |
| 2016 | President | Trump 79.5 - 17.3% |
| 2016 | Senator | Paul 69.1 - 30.9% |
| 2019 | Governor | Bevin 64.9 - 33.0% |
| 2019 | Secretary of State | Adams 70.3 - 29.7% |
| 2019 | Attorney General | Cameron 73.2 - 26.8% |
| 2019 | Auditor of Public Accounts | Harmon 74.3 - 23.5% |
| 2019 | State Treasurer | Ball 76.6 - 23.4% |
| 2019 | Commissioner of Agriculture | Quarles 74.6 - 23.0% |
| 2020 | President | Trump 80.2 - 18.4% |
| 2020 | Senator | McConnell 75.1 - 20.7% |
| 2020 | Amendment 1 | Yes 55.4 - 44.6% |
| 2020 | Amendment 2 | No 68.4 - 31.6% |

=== 2022 – present ===
| Year | Office | Results |
|---|---|---|
| 2022 | Senator | Paul 81.9 - 18.1% |
| 2022 | Amendment 1 | Yes 60.0 - 40.0% |
| 2022 | Amendment 2 | Yes 68.7 - 31.3% |
| 2023 | Governor | Cameron 68.2 - 31.8% |
| 2023 | Secretary of State | Adams 81.7 - 18.3% |
| 2023 | Attorney General | Coleman 80.0 - 20.0% |
| 2023 | Auditor of Public Accounts | Ball 82.3 - 17.7% |
| 2023 | State Treasurer | Metcalf 80.0 - 20.0% |
| 2023 | Commissioner of Agriculture | Shell 81.9 - 18.1% |
| 2024 | President | Trump 84.1 - 14.7% |
| 2024 | Amendment 1 | Yes 71.1 - 28.9% |
| 2024 | Amendment 2 | No 60.9 - 39.1% |

== List of members representing the district ==
| Member | Party | Years | Electoral history | District location |
|---|---|---|---|---|
| James C. Brock (Harlan) | Republican | January 1, 1968 – January 1, 1972 | Elected in 1967. Lost renomination. | 1964–1972 |
| Gene Huff (London) | Republican | January 1, 1972 – June 30, 1994 | Elected in 1971. Reelected in 1975. Reelected in 1979. Reelected in 1983. Reelected in 1988. Reelected in 1992. Resigned. | 1972–1974 |
| Gene Huff (London) | Republican | January 1, 1972 – June 30, 1994 | Elected in 1971. Reelected in 1975. Reelected in 1979. Reelected in 1983. Reelected in 1988. Reelected in 1992. Resigned. | 1974–1984 |
| Gene Huff (London) | Republican | January 1, 1972 – June 30, 1994 | Elected in 1971. Reelected in 1975. Reelected in 1979. Reelected in 1983. Reelected in 1988. Reelected in 1992. Resigned. | 1984–1993; Clay, Jackson (part), Knox (part), Laurel, and Leslie Counties. |
| Gene Huff (London) | Republican | January 1, 1972 – June 30, 1994 | Elected in 1971. Reelected in 1975. Reelected in 1979. Reelected in 1983. Reelected in 1988. Reelected in 1992. Resigned. | 1993–1997 |
| Albert Robinson (London) | Republican | July 1994 – January 1, 2005 | Elected to finish Huff's term. Reelected in 1996. Reelected in 2000. Lost renomination. | 1993–1997 |
| Albert Robinson (London) | Republican | July 1994 – January 1, 2005 | Elected to finish Huff's term. Reelected in 1996. Reelected in 2000. Lost renomination. | 1997–2003 |
| Albert Robinson (London) | Republican | July 1994 – January 1, 2005 | Elected to finish Huff's term. Reelected in 1996. Reelected in 2000. Lost renomination. | 2003–2015 |
| Tom Jensen (London) | Republican | January 1, 2005 – December 2012 | Elected in 2004. Reelected in 2008. Resigned to become a Judge of the 27th Circuit Court. | 2003–2015 |
| Albert Robinson (London) | Republican | January 1, 2013 – January 1, 2021 | Elected in 2012. Reelected in 2016. Lost renomination. | 2003–2015 |
| Albert Robinson (London) | Republican | January 1, 2013 – January 1, 2021 | Elected in 2012. Reelected in 2016. Lost renomination. | 2015–2023 |
| Brandon J. Storm (London) | Republican | January 1, 2021 – present | Elected in 2020. Reelected in 2024. | 2015–2023 |
| Brandon J. Storm (London) | Republican | January 1, 2021 – present | Elected in 2020. Reelected in 2024. | 2023–present |
