= Kentucky's 29th Senate district =

American legislative district

Kentucky's 29th State Senate district
Senator
Scott Madon; R–Pineville
since January 1, 2025
- Registration: 51.3% Democratic; 43.0% Republican; 5.3% No party preference
- Demographics: 95.3% White; 1.2% Black; 0.7% Hispanic; 0.3% Asian; 0.1% Native American; 0.2% Other; 2.3% Multiracial
- Population (2023): 120,597
- Registered voters (2025): 92,497

Kentucky's 29th Senatorial district is one of 38 districts in the Kentucky Senate. Located in the eastern part of the state, it comprises the counties of Bell, Floyd, Harlan, Knott, and Letcher. It has been represented by Scott Madon (R–Pineville) since 2025. As of 2023, the district had a population of 120,597.

== Voter registration ==
On January 1, 2025, the district had 92,497 registered voters, who were registered with the following parties.

Party	Registration	
Party	Voters	%
Democratic	47,467	51.32
Republican	39,802	43.03
Independent	2,681	2.90
Libertarian	222	0.24
Green	30	0.03
Constitution	20	0.02
Socialist Workers	7	0.01
Reform	5	0.01
"Other"	2,263	2.45
Total	92,497	100.00
Source: Kentucky State Board of Elections

== Election results from statewide races ==
=== 2014 – 2020 ===
Year	Office	Results (Note: Figures presented in this table are calculated by summing precinct election results published by the Kentucky State Board of Elections, using precinct data that list each precinct's senatorial district.)
2014	Senator	McConnell 61.1 - 35.6%
2015	Governor	Bevin 51.7 - 44.4%
2015	Secretary of State	Grimes 54.0 - 46.0%
2015	Attorney General	Beshear 54.4 - 45.6%
2015	Auditor of Public Accounts	Edelen 54.6 - 45.4%
2015	State Treasurer	Nelson 50.4 - 49.6%
2015	Commissioner of Agriculture	Quarles 54.3 - 45.7%
2016	President	Trump 77.7 - 19.4%
2016	Senator	Paul 60.3 - 39.7%
2019	Governor	Bevin 52.7 - 44.9%
2019	Secretary of State	Adams 58.6 - 41.4%
2019	Attorney General	Cameron 56.6 - 43.4%
2019	Auditor of Public Accounts	Harmon 59.8 - 37.6%
2019	State Treasurer	Ball 66.8 - 33.2%
2019	Commissioner of Agriculture	Quarles 59.7 - 37.9%
2020	President	Trump 78.7 - 20.1%
2020	Senator	McConnell 71.0 - 25.2%
2020	Amendment 1	Yes 52.7 - 47.3%
2020	Amendment 2	No 69.4 - 30.6%

=== 2022 – present ===
Year	Office	Results
2022	Senator	Paul 72.4 - 27.5%
2022	Amendment 1	Yes 54.7 - 45.3%
2022	Amendment 2	Yes 63.1 - 36.9%
2023	Governor	Cameron 52.0 - 48.0%
2023	Secretary of State	Adams 68.9 - 31.1%
2023	Attorney General	Coleman 67.4 - 32.6%
2023	Auditor of Public Accounts	Ball 71.6 - 28.4%
2023	State Treasurer	Metcalf 64.7 - 35.3%
2023	Commissioner of Agriculture	Shell 69.0 - 31.0%
2024	President	Trump 82.0 - 16.7%
2024	Amendment 1	Yes 64.0 - 36.0%
2024	Amendment 2	No 64.8 - 35.2%

== List of members representing the district ==
Member	Party	Years	Electoral history	District location
Doug Hays (McDowell)	Democratic	January 1, 1944 – August 31, 1957	Elected in 1943. Reelected in 1947. Reelected in 1951. Reelected in 1955. Died.	1944–1964; Floyd, Knott, and Martin Counties.
Jerry F. Howell (Price)	Democratic	November 1957 – January 1, 1960	Elected to finish Hays's term. Retired.	1944–1964; Floyd, Knott, and Martin Counties.
Burnis T. Martin (Prestonburg)	Democratic	January 1, 1960 – January 1, 1964	Elected in 1959. Retired.	1944–1964; Floyd, Knott, and Martin Counties.
Fairis Johnson (Martin)	Democratic	January 1, 1964 – January 1, 1968	Elected in 1963. Retired.	1964–1972
Clifford B. Latta (Prestonburg)	Democratic	January 1, 1968 – January 1, 1972	Elected in 1967. Lost renomination.	1964–1972
John Chris Cornett (Hindman)	Democratic	January 1, 1972 – January 1, 1976	Elected in 1971. Retired.	1972–1974
John Chris Cornett (Hindman)	Democratic	January 1, 1972 – January 1, 1976	Elected in 1971. Retired.	1974–1984
Jim Hammond (Martin)	Democratic	January 1, 1976 – January 1, 1980	Elected in 1975. Retired.	1974–1984
Benny Ray Bailey (Hindman)	Democratic	January 1, 1980 – January 1, 2001	Elected in 1979. Reelected in 1983. Reelected in 1988. Reelected in 1992. Reelected in 1996. Lost renomination.	1974–1984
Benny Ray Bailey (Hindman)	Democratic	January 1, 1980 – January 1, 2001	Elected in 1979. Reelected in 1983. Reelected in 1988. Reelected in 1992. Reelected in 1996. Lost renomination.	1984–1993; Floyd (part), Knott, Martin (part), and Perry (part) Counties.
Benny Ray Bailey (Hindman)	Democratic	January 1, 1980 – January 1, 2001	Elected in 1979. Reelected in 1983. Reelected in 1988. Reelected in 1992. Reelected in 1996. Lost renomination.	1993–1997
Benny Ray Bailey (Hindman)	Democratic	January 1, 1980 – January 1, 2001	Elected in 1979. Reelected in 1983. Reelected in 1988. Reelected in 1992. Reelected in 1996. Lost renomination.	1997–2003
Johnny Ray Turner (Drift)	Democratic	January 1, 2001 – January 1, 2021	Elected in 2000. Reelected in 2004. Reelected in 2008. Reelected in 2012. Reelected in 2016. Lost reelection.	1997–2003
Johnny Ray Turner (Drift)	Democratic	January 1, 2001 – January 1, 2021	Elected in 2000. Reelected in 2004. Reelected in 2008. Reelected in 2012. Reelected in 2016. Lost reelection.	2003–2015
Johnny Ray Turner (Drift)	Democratic	January 1, 2001 – January 1, 2021	Elected in 2000. Reelected in 2004. Reelected in 2008. Reelected in 2012. Reelected in 2016. Lost reelection.	2015–2023
Johnnie L. Turner (Harlan)	Republican	January 1, 2021 – October 22, 2024	Elected in 2020. Died.	2015–2023
Johnnie L. Turner (Harlan)	Republican	January 1, 2021 – October 22, 2024	Elected in 2020. Died.	2023–present
Scott Madon (Pineville)	Republican	January 1, 2025 – present	Elected in 2024.	2023–present
