= Kentucky's 3rd Senate district =

American legislative district

Kentucky's 3rd State Senate district
Senator
Craig Richardson; R–Hopkinsville
since January 1, 2025
- Registration: 46.4% Democratic; 42.5% Republican; 10.2% No party preference
- Demographics: 74.5% White; 13.0% Black; 6.1% Hispanic; 1.0% Asian; 0.1% Native American; 0.2% Hawaiian/Pacific Islander; 0.2% Other; 4.8% Multiracial
- Population (2023): 115,942
- Registered voters (2025): 85,011

Kentucky's 3rd Senatorial district is one of 38 districts in the Kentucky Senate. Located in the western part of the state, it comprises the counties of Caldwell, Christian, and Muhlenberg. It has been represented by Craig Richardson (R–Hopkinsville) since 2025. As of 2023, the district had a population of 115,942.

== Voter registration ==
On January 1, 2025, the district had 85,011 registered voters, who were registered with the following parties.

Party	Registration	
Party	Voters	%
Democratic	39,436	46.39
Republican	36,171	42.55
Independent	3,462	4.07
Libertarian	550	0.65
Constitution	78	0.09
Green	54	0.06
Socialist Workers	11	0.01
Reform	4	0.00
"Other"	5,245	6.17
Total	85,011	100.00
Source: Kentucky State Board of Elections

== Election results from statewide races ==
=== 2014 – 2020 ===
Year	Office	Results (Note: Figures presented in this table are calculated by summing precinct election results published by the Kentucky State Board of Elections, using precinct data that list each precinct's senatorial district.)
2014	Senator	McConnell 61.6 - 35.3%
2015	Governor	Bevin 57.9 - 39.5%
2015	Secretary of State	Knipper 54.9 - 45.1%
2015	Attorney General	Westerfield 66.7 - 33.3%
2015	Auditor of Public Accounts	Harmon 60.4 - 39.6%
2015	State Treasurer	Ball 62.5 - 37.5%
2015	Commissioner of Agriculture	Quarles 65.0 - 35.0%
2016	President	Trump 67.5 - 29.1%
2016	Senator	Paul 67.6 - 32.4%
2019	Governor	Bevin 57.5 - 40.3%
2019	Secretary of State	Adams 63.0 - 37.0%
2019	Attorney General	Cameron 65.2 - 34.8%
2019	Auditor of Public Accounts	Harmon 63.8 - 33.2%
2019	State Treasurer	Ball 66.6 - 33.4%
2019	Commissioner of Agriculture	Quarles 64.9 - 32.5%
2020	President	Trump 67.8 - 30.3%
2020	Senator	McConnell 61.0 - 34.0%
2020	Amendment 1	Yes 64.7 - 35.3%
2020	Amendment 2	No 63.8 - 36.2%

=== 2022 – present ===
Year	Office	Results
2022	Senator	Paul 68.9 - 31.1%
2022	Amendment 1	Yes 55.8 - 44.2%
2022	Amendment 2	Yes 59.9 - 40.1%
2023	Governor	Cameron 56.4 - 43.6%
2023	Secretary of State	Adams 66.4 - 33.5%
2023	Attorney General	Coleman 64.8 - 35.2%
2023	Auditor of Public Accounts	Ball 65.8 - 34.2%
2023	State Treasurer	Metcalf 63.6 - 36.4%
2023	Commissioner of Agriculture	Shell 66.6 - 33.4%
2024	President	Trump 71.4 - 27.3%
2024	Amendment 1	Yes 67.5 - 32.5%
2024	Amendment 2	No 61.6 - 38.4%

== List of members representing the district ==
Member	Party	Years	Electoral history	District location
Pat McCuiston (Pembroke)	Democratic	January 1, 1968 – January 1, 1993	Elected in 1967. Reelected in 1971. Reelected in 1975. Reelected in 1979. Reelected in 1983. Reelected in 1988. Lost renomination.	1968–1972
Pat McCuiston (Pembroke)	Democratic	January 1, 1968 – January 1, 1993	Elected in 1967. Reelected in 1971. Reelected in 1975. Reelected in 1979. Reelected in 1983. Reelected in 1988. Lost renomination.	1972–1974
Pat McCuiston (Pembroke)	Democratic	January 1, 1968 – January 1, 1993	Elected in 1967. Reelected in 1971. Reelected in 1975. Reelected in 1979. Reelected in 1983. Reelected in 1988. Lost renomination.	1974–1984
Pat McCuiston (Pembroke)	Democratic	January 1, 1968 – January 1, 1993	Elected in 1967. Reelected in 1971. Reelected in 1975. Reelected in 1979. Reelected in 1983. Reelected in 1988. Lost renomination.	1984–1993; Butler (part), Christian, Muhlenberg (part), and Todd Counties.
Joey Pendleton (Hopkinsville)	Democratic	January 1, 1993 – January 1, 2013	Elected in 1992. Reelected in 1996. Reelected in 2000. Reelected in 2004. Reelected in 2008. Lost reelection.	1993–1995
Joey Pendleton (Hopkinsville)	Democratic	January 1, 1993 – January 1, 2013	Elected in 1992. Reelected in 1996. Reelected in 2000. Reelected in 2004. Reelected in 2008. Lost reelection.	1995–1997
Joey Pendleton (Hopkinsville)	Democratic	January 1, 1993 – January 1, 2013	Elected in 1992. Reelected in 1996. Reelected in 2000. Reelected in 2004. Reelected in 2008. Lost reelection.	1997–2003
Joey Pendleton (Hopkinsville)	Democratic	January 1, 1993 – January 1, 2013	Elected in 1992. Reelected in 1996. Reelected in 2000. Reelected in 2004. Reelected in 2008. Lost reelection.	2003–2015
Whitney Westerfield (Fruit Hill)	Republican	January 1, 2013 – January 1, 2025	Elected in 2012. Reelected in 2016. Reelected in 2020. Retired.	2003–2015
Whitney Westerfield (Fruit Hill)	Republican	January 1, 2013 – January 1, 2025	Elected in 2012. Reelected in 2016. Reelected in 2020. Retired.	2015–2023
Whitney Westerfield (Fruit Hill)	Republican	January 1, 2013 – January 1, 2025	Elected in 2012. Reelected in 2016. Reelected in 2020. Retired.	2023–present
Craig Richardson (Hopkinsville)	Republican	January 1, 2025 – present	Elected in 2024.	2023–present
