= 1993 Kentucky elections =

A general election was held in the U.S. state of Kentucky on November 2, 1993. The primary election for all offices was held on May 25, 1993. Following the ratification of 1992 Kentucky Amendment 2, this was the last general election in Kentucky held in the year following a presidential election.

== State offices ==
=== Kentucky Supreme Court ===
1993 Kentucky Supreme Court 7th district special election
- November 2, 1993
- District 7
Candidate	Janet Stumbo	Sara Walter Combs	David Welch
Popular vote	46,152	39,234	20,755
Percentage	43.48%	36.96%	19.55%
- County results Stumbo: 40–50% 50–60% Combs: 40–50% 50–60% 60–70% 70–80% 80–90% Welch: 40–50% 50–60%
Justice before election
Sara Walter Combs
Elected Justice
Janet Stumbo

The Kentucky Supreme Court consists of seven justices elected in non-partisan elections to staggered eight-year terms. A special election was held in district 7 in 1993.

==== District 1 ====
1993 Kentucky Supreme Court 7th district special election
Candidate	Votes	%
Janet Stumbo	46,152	43.48
Sara Walter Combs (incumbent)	39,234	36.96
David Welch	20,755	19.55
Total votes	106,141	100.0

=== Other judicial elections ===
All judges of the Kentucky District Courts were elected in non-partisan elections to five-year terms in order to move future elections to midterm years.

=== Commonwealth’s Attorneys ===
Commonwealth's Attorneys, who serve as the prosecutors for felonies in the state, are normally elected to six-year terms. One attorney is elected for each of the 57 circuits of the Kentucky Circuit Courts. In 1993, all were elected to seven-year terms in order to move future elections to even-numbered years.

=== Circuit Clerks ===
Each county elected a Circuit Court Clerk to a seven-year term in order to move future elections to even-numbered years.

== Local offices ==
=== County officers ===
All county officials were elected in partisan elections to five-year terms in order to move future elections to midterm years. The offices include the County Judge/Executive, the Fiscal Court (Magistrates and/or Commissioners), County Clerk, County Attorney, Jailer, Coroner, Surveyor, Property Value Administrator, Constables, and Sheriff.

=== Mayors ===
Mayors in Kentucky are normally elected to four-year terms, with cities currently holding their elections in either presidential or midterm years. In 1993, cities which held elections elected their mayor to a five-year term in order to move future elections to midterm years.

=== City councils ===
Each incorporated city elected its council members to a three-year term in order to move future elections to even-numbered years.

== See also ==
- Elections in Kentucky
- Politics of Kentucky
- Political party strength in Kentucky
