= 2015 Kentucky Attorney General election =

- November 3, 2015
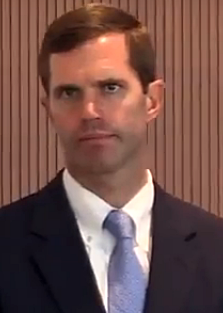

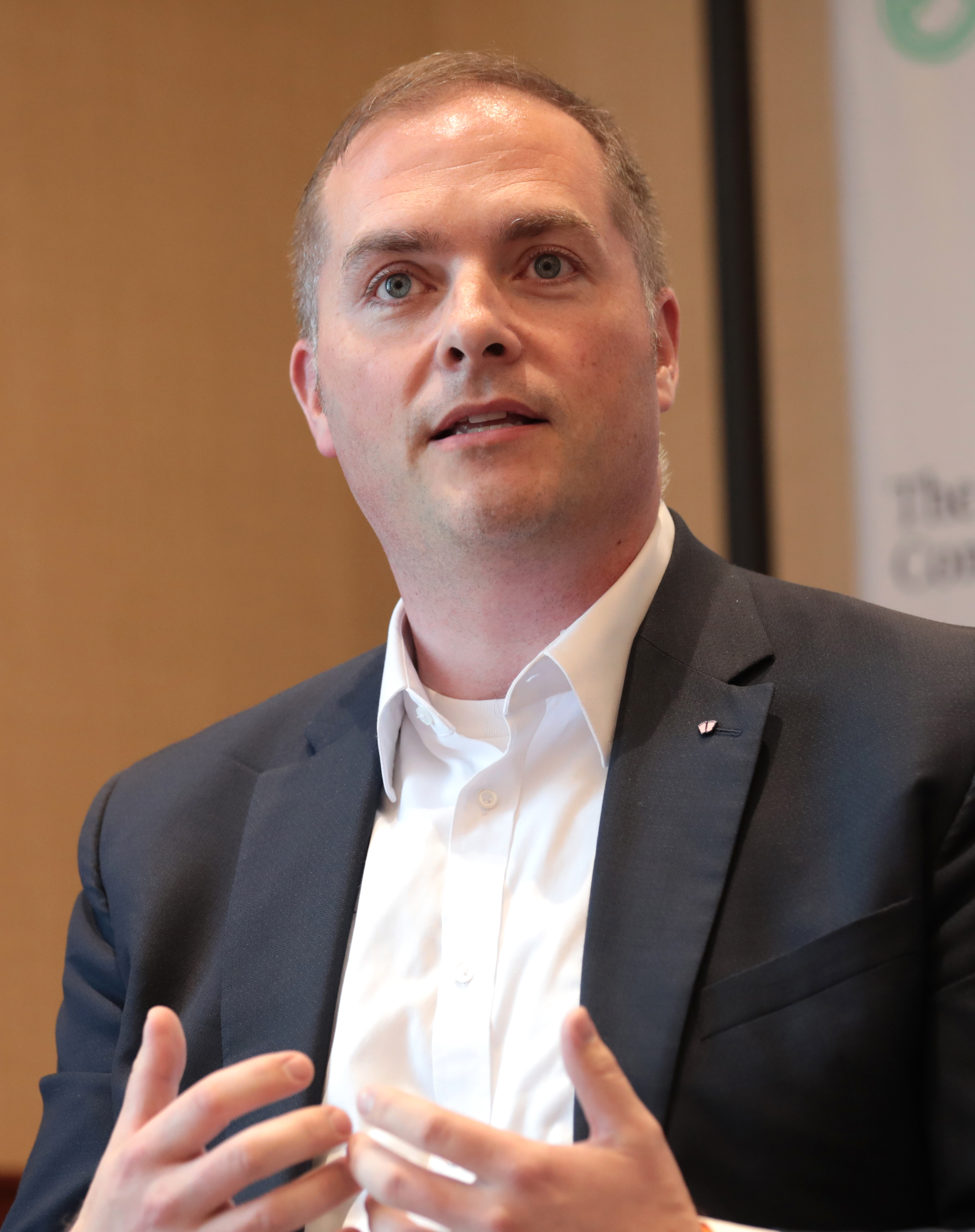
Nominee	Andy Beshear	Whitney Westerfield
Party	Democratic	Republican
Popular vote	479,567	477,366
Percentage	50.12%	49.88%
- Beshear: 50–60% 60–70% 70–80% 80–90% Westerfield: 50–60% 60–70% 70–80% 80–90%
Attorney General before election
Jack Conway
Democratic
Elected Attorney General
Andy Beshear
Democratic

The 2015 Kentucky Attorney General election was held on November 3, 2015, as part of the 2015 Kentucky elections to elect the Attorney General of Kentucky. Incumbent attorney general Jack Conway was term-limited, and instead ran for governor of Kentucky. He was succeeded by Democratic candidate Andy Beshear.

== Democratic primary ==
=== Candidates ===
==== Nominee ====
- Andy Beshear, attorney and son of Steve Beshear

==== Declined ====
- Alison Lundergan Grimes, Secretary of State of Kentucky (2012–2020) and candidate for the United States Senate in 2014 (ran for reelection)

== Republican primary ==
=== Candidates ===
==== Nominee ====
- Whitney Westerfield, state senator from the 3rd district (2013–2025)

==== Eliminated in primary ====
- Michael T. Hogan, County Attorney of Lawrence County (2003–2022)

=== Results ===
Republican primary results
Party	Candidate	Votes	%
Republican	Whitney H. Westerfield	96,605	53.38
Republican	Michael T. Hogan	84,386	46.62
Total votes		180,991	100.0

== General election ==
=== Predictions ===
Source	Ranking
Governing	Tossup

=== Polling ===
Poll source	Date(s) administered	Sample size	Margin of error	Andy Beshear (D)	Whitney Westerfield (R)	Other	Undecided
SurveyUSA	October 23–26, 2015	798	± 3.5%	47%	35%	—	17%
WKU	October 19–25, 2015	770	± 3.5%	42%	36%	—	22%
SurveyUSA	September 22–27, 2015	701	± 3.8%	38%	38%	—	22%
SurveyUSA	July 22–28, 2015	685	± 3.8%	40%	33%	—	24%
Public Policy Polling	June 18–21, 2015	1,108	± 2.9%	36%	41%	—	23%

Hypothetical polling

Poll source	Date(s) administered	Sample size	Margin of error	Andy Beshear (D)	Luke Morgan (R)	Other	Undecided
Gravis Marketing	January 5–6, 2015	608	± 4%	42%	37%	—	22%

=== Results ===
2015 Kentucky Attorney General election
Party	Candidate	Votes	%
Democratic	Andy Beshear	479,567	50.12
Republican	Whitney H. Westerfield	477,366	49.88
Total votes		956,933	100.0
Democratic hold			

=== By congressional district ===
Beshear won two of six congressional districts, including one that elected a Republican.

District	Beshear	Westerfield	Representative
1st	45%	55%	Ed Whitfield
2nd	47%	53%	Brett Guthrie
3rd	64%	36%	John Yarmuth
4th	45%	55%	Thomas Massie
5th	41%	59%	Hal Rogers
6th	54%	46%	Andy Barr

== Aftermath ==
In 2016, Steve Beshear's former personal cabinet secretary, Tim Longmeyer, was mired in controversy when he was exposed on bribery charges, including redirecting $6,000 of kickbacks into Andy Beshear's Attorney General campaign. Andy Beshear had recently hired Longmeyer as a deputy. However, the prosecutors in Longmeyer's case indicated that there is no evidence to support that Andy Beshear knew what Longmeyer was doing.

Over the next three years, Republican Governor Matt Bevin spearheaded an investigation into former governor Steve Beshear's administration as well as Andy Beshear's Attorney General campaign. Spending approximately $550,000 leading up to the 2019 Kentucky gubernatorial election, the investigation led to no conclusive results regarding the culpability of Steve or Andy Beshear.
