= Ausmus =

Ausmus is a surname found in the United States. Notable people with this surname include:

- Brad Ausmus (born 1969), an American baseball player and coach
- Emily Ausmus (born 2005), an American water polo player
- J. C. Ausmus, an American politician from Kentucky
- Jeremy Ausmus (born 1979), an American poker player
