= Robert Conley =

Robert or Bob Conley may refer to:

- Robert Conley (basketball) (born 1977), American basketball player
- Robert Conley (music producer) (born 1973), American record producer, programmer and engineer
- Robert Conley (reporter) (1928–2013), American reporter
- Robert B. Conley, American judge, Associate Justice of the Kentucky Supreme Court
- Robert J. Conley (1940–2014), Cherokee author
- Bob Conley (baseball) (1934–2022), American baseball player
