= 2004 Kentucky elections =

A general election was held in the U.S. state of Kentucky on November 2, 2004. The primary election for all offices was held on May 18, 2004.

== Federal offices ==
=== United States President ===
Kentucky had 8 electoral votes in the Electoral College. Republican president George W. Bush won with 60% of the vote.

=== United States Senate ===
Incumbent Republican senator Jim Bunning won reelection, defeating Democratic candidate Daniel Mongiardo.

=== United States House of Representatives ===
Kentucky has six congressional districts, electing five Republicans and one Democrat. A special election was also held in the 6th district in February 2004.

== State offices ==
=== Kentucky Senate ===
The Kentucky Senate consists of 38 members. In 2004, half of the chamber (all odd-numbered districts) was up for election. Republicans maintained their majority, without gaining or losing any seats.

=== Kentucky House of Representatives ===
All 100 seats in the Kentucky House of Representatives were up for election in 2004. Democrats maintained their majority, losing seven seats.

=== Kentucky Supreme Court ===
2004 Kentucky Supreme Court 7th district election
- November 2, 2004
- District 7
Candidate	Will T. Scott	Janet Stumbo
Popular vote	80,651	78,529
Percentage	50.67%	49.33%
- County results Scott: 50–60% 60–70% Stumbo: 50–60% 60–70%
Justice before election
Janet Stumbo
Elected Justice
Will T. Scott

The Kentucky Supreme Court consists of seven justices elected in non-partisan elections to staggered eight-year terms. District 7 was up for election in 2004.

==== District 7 ====
2004 Kentucky Supreme Court 7th district election
Candidate	Votes	%
Will T. Scott	80,651	50.67
Janet L. Stumbo (incumbent)	78,529	49.33
Total votes	159,180	100.0

== Local offices ==
=== Mayors ===
Mayors in Kentucky are elected to four-year terms, with cities holding their elections in either presidential or midterm years.

=== City councils ===
Each incorporated city elected its council members to a two-year term.

=== School boards ===
Local school board members are elected to staggered four-year terms, with half up for election in 2004.

=== Louisville Metro Council ===
The Louisville Metro Council is elected to staggered four-year terms, with even-numbered districts up for election in 2004.

== Ballot measures ==
=== Amendment 1 ===
Results by county: Yes: 50–60%; 60–70%; 70–80%; 80–90%; 90–100%

Amendment 1
Choice	Votes	%
For	1,222,125	74.56
Against	417,097	25.44
Total	1,639,222	100.00

== See also ==
- Elections in Kentucky
- Politics of Kentucky
- Political party strength in Kentucky
