= David Allen Barber =

American justice

Justice of the Kentucky Supreme Court
- In office March 23, 2015 – December 7, 2015
- Appointed by: Steve Beshear
- Preceded by: Will T. Scott
- Succeeded by: Samuel T. Wright III

Personal details
- Education: Juris Doctor
- Alma mater: University of Louisville School of Law

David Allen Barber was a justice of the Kentucky Supreme Court from March 23, 2015, to December 2015 for the 7th district.

== Education ==
He obtained a degree in communication in 1960 from University of Louisville, followed by a masters is speech communication in 1991 from the University of Illinois, then he obtained his Juris Doctor in 1994 from the University of Louisville School of Law.

== Legal career ==
Barber was admitted to the Kentucky Bar Association on the May 7, 1981.

He served from 2000 until 2007 on the Kentucky Court of Appeals court for the 7th district, and had also worked as an attorney in both public and private practice. He obtained his Juris Doctor degree from the University of Louisville School of Law.

Barber was appointed by Kentucky governor Steve Beshear to fill the vacant seat that the resignation of Will T. Scott had left. The position was only until elections in November of the same year, when Samuel T. Wright III won the position, Barber did not run. Prior to the appointment he had been working as policy and legal advisor to Greg Stumbo.

In 2018 he ran for the Kentucky Court of Appeals but was defeated by Larry E. Thompson who gained 53.9% of the vote.

In 2020 governor Andy Beshear appointed Barber to be circuit judge for the 21st Judicial Circuit, Division 2, of Kentucky.

Political offices
Preceded by Will T. Scott	Justice of the Kentucky Supreme Court; 2015–2015	Succeeded by Samuel T. Wright III
