= Kelsey Friend Sr. =

American politician

Member of the Kentucky Senate from the 31st district
- In office January 1, 1984 – January 1, 1997
- Preceded by: John Doug Hays
- Succeeded by: Gary C. Johnson
- In office January 1, 1972 – January 1, 1980
- Preceded by: Francis Burke
- Succeeded by: John Doug Hays

Personal details
- Born: March 18, 1922
- Died: August 25, 2001 (aged 79)
- Party: Democratic
- Children: Kelsey Friend Jr.

Kelsey Evans Friend Sr. (March 18, 1922 – August 25, 2001) was an American politician from Kentucky who was a member of the Kentucky Senate from 1972 to 1980 and 1984 to 1997. Friend was first elected to the senate in 1971. He was defeated for renomination in 1979 by John Doug Hays. Friend challenged Hays again in 1983, defeating him. Friend was defeated again for renomination in 1996 by Gary C. Johnson.

On June 15, 1972, Friend was one of 20 Democratic senators that voted for Kentucky to ratify the Equal Rights Amendment.

He died in August 2001 at age 79.
