= Kelsey Friend Jr. =

American politician

Judge of the 35th Kentucky District Court
- In office January 2000 – January 2019
- Preceded by: Larry E. Thompson
- Succeeded by: T. J. May

Member of the Kentucky House of Representatives from the 93rd district
- In office January 1, 1995 – January 1, 1997
- Preceded by: Clayton Little
- Succeeded by: Chris Ratliff

Personal details
- Born: May 29, 1946
- Died: October 11, 2023 (aged 77)
- Party: Democratic

Kelsey Evans Friend Jr. (May 29, 1946 – October 11, 2023) was an American politician from Kentucky who was a member of the Kentucky House of Representatives from 1995 to 1997 and a judge of the 35th District Court from 2000 to 2019. Friend was elected to the house in 1994 after incumbent representative Clayton Little retired. He was defeated for reelection in 1996 by Republican Chris Ratliff. Friend served in the General Assembly with his father Kelsey Friend Sr., who was also defeated in 1996.

Friend became a judge of the 35th District Court in 2000 after incumbent judge Larry E. Thompson was elected to the Circuit Court. He retired in 2018.

Friend died on October 11, 2023.
