= Michael Bowling =

American politician

Mike Bowling

Member of the Kentucky House of Representatives from the 87th district
- In office January 1, 1991 – January 1, 1999
- Preceded by: Pearl Ray LeFevers
- Succeeded by: J. C. Ausmus

Personal details
- Born: February 27, 1956
- Died: February 20, 2021 (aged 64)
- Party: Democratic
- Children: Adam Bowling

Michael Dean Bowling (February 27, 1956 – February 20, 2021) was an American politician from Kentucky who was a member of the Kentucky House of Representatives from 1991 to 1999. Bowling was first elected in 1990, defeating Republican incumbent Pearl Ray LeFevers. He did not seek reelection in 1998 and was succeeded by Republican J. C. Ausmus.

Bowling died in February 2021 at age 64.
