= Gene Huff =

American politician

Member of the Kentucky Senate from the 21st district
- In office January 1, 1972 – June 30, 1994
- Preceded by: James Brock
- Succeeded by: Albert Robinson

Member of the Kentucky House of Representatives from the 85th district
- In office January 1, 1968 – January 1, 1972
- Preceded by: Dexter McCowan
- Succeeded by: Albert Robinson

Personal details
- Party: Republican

Eugene Huff (October 6, 1929 – December 8, 2011) was an American politician.

Born in Franklin, Ohio, pastor of First Pentecostal Church, founder of Good News Outreach Ministries and WYGE Christian Radio. Huff served in the Kentucky House of Representatives and then was elected to the Kentucky State Senate serving until 1994, when he resigned. On June 15, 1972, Huff was one of 11 Republican senators that voted against Kentucky's ratification of the Equal Rights Amendment. He died in London, Kentucky
