= Gary C. Johnson =

American politician

Gary Johnson

Member of the Kentucky Senate from the 31st district
- In office January 1, 1997 – January 1, 2001
- Preceded by: Kelsey Friend Sr.
- Succeeded by: Ray Jones II

Personal details
- Born: 1946 (age 79–80)
- Party: Democratic

Gary C. Johnson (born 1946) is an American politician from Kentucky who was a member of the Kentucky Senate from 1997 to 2001. Johnson was elected in 1996, defeating incumbent senator Kelsey Friend Sr. for renomination. At the time it was the most expensive state legislative race in the history of Kentucky. He did not seek reelection in 2000.

In 1993, he founded Gary C. Johnson, P.S.C, a personal injury law firm.
