= Sallie J. Seals White =

American lawyer (c. 1869–?)

Sallie J. Seals White (née Sallie J. Seals; born 1868, or 1871–?) was an American lawyer, she was Kentucky’s first African American female lawyer.

White was born around 1871 in Kentucky. She earned her bachelor's degree from Fisk University and began serving as an instructor for Central Law School in 1892. She married lawyer Albert S. White around the same year, who would later serve as the dean of Central Law School of Louisville (part of Simmons College of Kentucky) from 1895 to 1911.

In 1904, she formally graduated from Central Law School and became the first African American female admitted to practice law in Kentucky. In addition to serving as a dean, her husband became the Head of the National Negro Bar Association in 1909.

Her husband was shot to death in 1911. While census records from the time do indicate that White and her husband had children, it is uncertain what ultimately became of the family.

== See also ==
- List of first women lawyers and judges in Kentucky
