= 2015 Kentucky elections =

A general election was held in the U.S. state of Kentucky on November 3, 2015. All of Kentucky's executive officers were up for election. Primary elections were held on May 19, 2015.

== Governor and Lieutenant Governor ==
Incumbent Democratic Governor Steve Beshear was term-limited and could not run for re-election to a third term in office.

In Kentucky, gubernatorial candidates pick their own running mates and they are elected on shared tickets in both the primary and general elections.

The candidates for the Democratic nomination were Attorney General of Kentucky Jack Conway and his running mate State Representative Sannie Overly; and retired engineer and 2014 Congressional candidate Geoff Young and his running mate Jonathan Masters. Conway and Overly easily defeated Young and Masters in the primary election for the Democratic Party nomination.

For the Republicans, businessman and candidate for the U.S. Senate in 2014 Matt Bevin ran on a ticket with Tea Party activist and 2014 State House candidate Jenean Hampton; Agriculture Commissioner of Kentucky James Comer ran on a ticket with State Senator Christian McDaniel; former Louisville Metro Councilman and nominee for Mayor of Louisville in 2010 Hal Heiner ran on a ticket with former Lexington-Fayette Urban County Councilwoman and nominee for Kentucky State Treasurer in 2011 KC Crosbie; and former Associate Justice of the Kentucky Supreme Court Will T. Scott ran on a ticket with former Menifee County Sheriff Rodney Coffey. Bevin held an 83-vote lead over Comer in the primary election, with both Heiner and Scott conceding. The Associated Press, referring to the race between Bevin and Comer a "virtual tie", did not call the race in favor of either candidate. In addition, Comer refused to concede and stated that he would ask for a recanvass. The request for recanvass was filed with the Kentucky Secretary of State's office on May 20, 2015, with Secretary of State Alison Lundergan Grimes ordering the recanvass to occur at 9:00 a.m. local time on May 28, 2015. Upon completion of the recanvass, Grimes announced that Bevin remained 83 votes ahead of Comer. Grimes also stated that should Comer want a full recount, it would require a court order from the Franklin Circuit Court. On May 29, Comer announced he would not request a recount and conceded the nomination to Bevin.

=== Results ===
Kentucky gubernatorial election, 2015
Party	Candidate	Votes	%
Republican	Matt Bevin/Jenean Hampton	511,771	52.5
Democratic	Jack Conway/Sannie Overly	426,827	43.8
Independent	Drew Curtis/Heather Curtis	35,627	3.7
Total votes		974,225	100.0
Republican gain from Democratic			

== Secretary of State ==
Incumbent Democratic Secretary of State Alison Lundergan Grimes was eligible to run for re-election to a second term in office. She had considered running for Governor of Kentucky or for Attorney General of Kentucky. She decided to seek re-election.

=== Democratic primary ===
==== Candidates ====
Declared

- Charles Lovett, candidate for Jefferson County Justice of the Peace in 2010
- Alison Lundergan Grimes, incumbent Secretary of State and nominee for the U.S. Senate in 2014

Declined

- Colmon Elridge, aide to Governor Steve Beshear and former Executive Vice President of Young Democrats of America
- David O'Neill, Fayette County Property Valuation Administrator

==== Results ====
Primary results by county: Lundergan Grimes: 50–60%; 60–70%; 70–80%; 80–90%

Democratic primary results
Party	Candidate	Votes	%
Democratic	Alison Lundergan Grimes (incumbent)	131,640	73.25
Democratic	Charles Lovett	48,083	26.75
Total votes		179,723	100.0

=== Republican primary ===
==== Candidates ====
Declared

- Steve Knipper, former Erlanger City Councilman

Withdrew

- Michael Pitzer, candidate for the State House in 2008

Declined

- Michael Adams, attorney and general counsel for the Republican Governors Association
- Matt Bevin, businessman and candidate for U.S. Senate in 2014 (ran for Governor)
- Ken Fleming, former Louisville Metro Council member
- Damon Thayer, Majority Leader of the Kentucky Senate

=== General election ===
==== Polling ====
Poll source	Date(s) administered	Sample size	Margin of error	Alison Lundergan Grimes (D)	Steve Knipper (R)	Other	Undecided
SurveyUSA	October 23–26, 2015	798	± 3.5%	50%	37%	—	12%
WKU	October 19–25, 2015	770	± 3.5%	46%	35%	—	19%
SurveyUSA	September 22–27, 2015	701	± 3.8%	46%	38%	—	15%
SurveyUSA	July 22–28, 2015	685	± 3.8%	46%	40%	—	12%
Public Policy Polling	June 18–21, 2015	1,108	± 2.9%	42%	47%	—	12%
Gravis Marketing	January 5–6, 2015	608	± 4%	47%	46%	—	7%

==== Results ====
Kentucky Secretary of State election, 2015
Party	Candidate	Votes	%
Democratic	Alison Lundergan Grimes (incumbent)	493,598	51.2
Republican	Steve Knipper	471,209	48.8
Total votes		964,807	100.0
Democratic hold			

== Attorney General ==
Incumbent Democratic attorney general Jack Conway was term-limited and could not run for re-election to a third term in office. He instead ran for governor. The candidate that would go on to be elected Attorney General was Andy Beshear, the son of retiring governor Steve Beshear.

Beshear defeated Republican Whitney Westerfield by a margin of 0.2 percent, getting 50.1% of the vote to Westerfield's 49.9%. The margin was approximately 2,000 votes.

== Auditor of Public Accounts ==
2015 Kentucky Auditor of Public Accounts election
- November 3, 2015
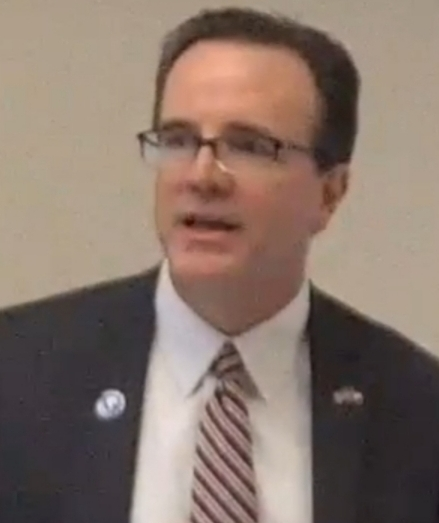

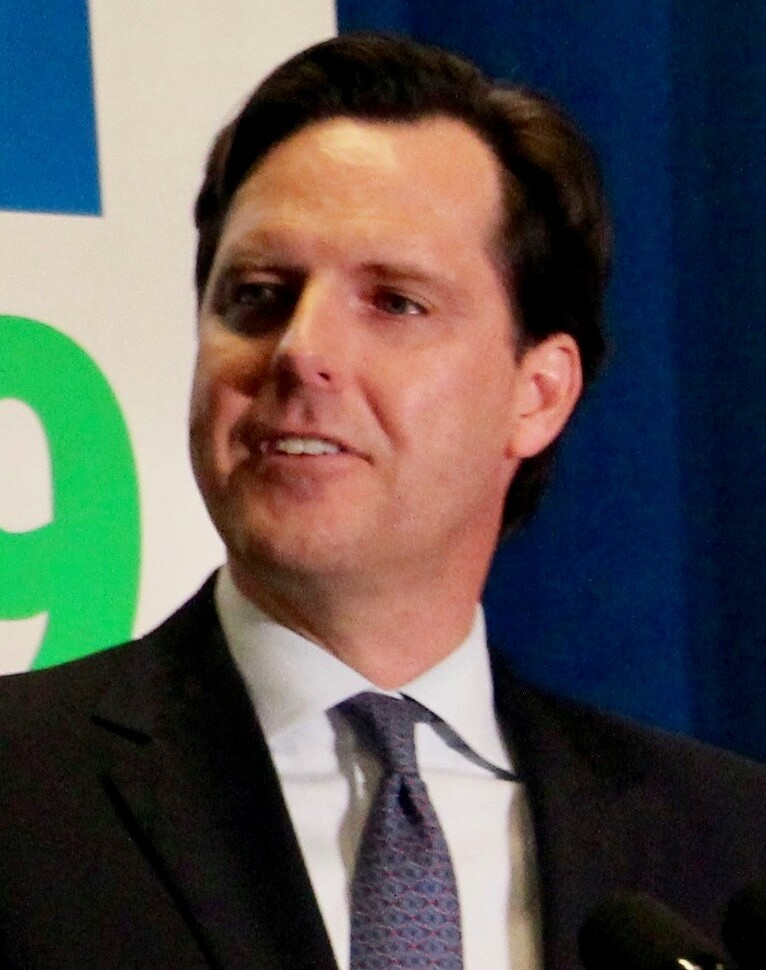
Nominee	Mike Harmon	Adam Edelen
Party	Republican	Democratic
Popular vote	486,741	450,316
Percentage	51.9%	48.1%
- Harmon: 50–60% 60–70% 70–80% 80–90% Edelen: 50–60% 60–70%
Auditor before election
Adam Edelen
Democratic
Elected Auditor
Mike Harmon
Republican

Incumbent Democratic state auditor Adam Edelen had considered running for governor in 2015, even lining up a running mate, but ultimately declined to do so. He instead ran for re-election to a second term in office.

=== Democratic primary ===
==== Candidates ====
Declared

- Adam Edelen, incumbent State Auditor

Declined

- Chris Tobe, CFA, writer, former trustee of the Kentucky Retirement Systems and former staffer to State Auditor Ed Hatchett

=== Republican primary ===
==== Candidates ====
Declared

- Mike Harmon, State Representative and candidate for Lieutenant Governor of Kentucky in 2011

Declined

- Damon Thayer, Majority Leader of the Kentucky Senate

=== General election ===
==== Polling ====
Poll source	Date(s) administered	Sample size	Margin of error	Adam Edelen (D)	Mike Harmon (R)	Other	Undecided
SurveyUSA	October 23–26, 2015	798	± 3.5%	42%	34%	—	22%
WKU	October 19–25, 2015	770	± 3.5%	40%	35%	—	25%
SurveyUSA	September 22–27, 2015	701	± 3.8%	35%	33%	—	27%
SurveyUSA	July 22–28, 2015	685	± 3.8%	35%	31%	—	30%
Public Policy Polling	June 18–21, 2015	1,108	± 2.9%	33%	39%	—	27%

Hypothetical polling

Poll source	Date(s) administered	Sample size	Margin of error	Adam Edelen (D)	John Kemper (R)	Other	Undecided
Gravis Marketing	January 5–6, 2015	608	± 4%	30%	38%	—	32%

==== Results ====
Kentucky State Auditor election, 2015
Party	Candidate	Votes	%
Republican	Mike Harmon	486,741	51.9
Democratic	Adam Edelen (incumbent)	450,316	48.1
Total votes		937,057	100.0
Republican gain from Democratic			

== State Treasurer ==
2015 Kentucky State Treasurer election
- November 3, 2015
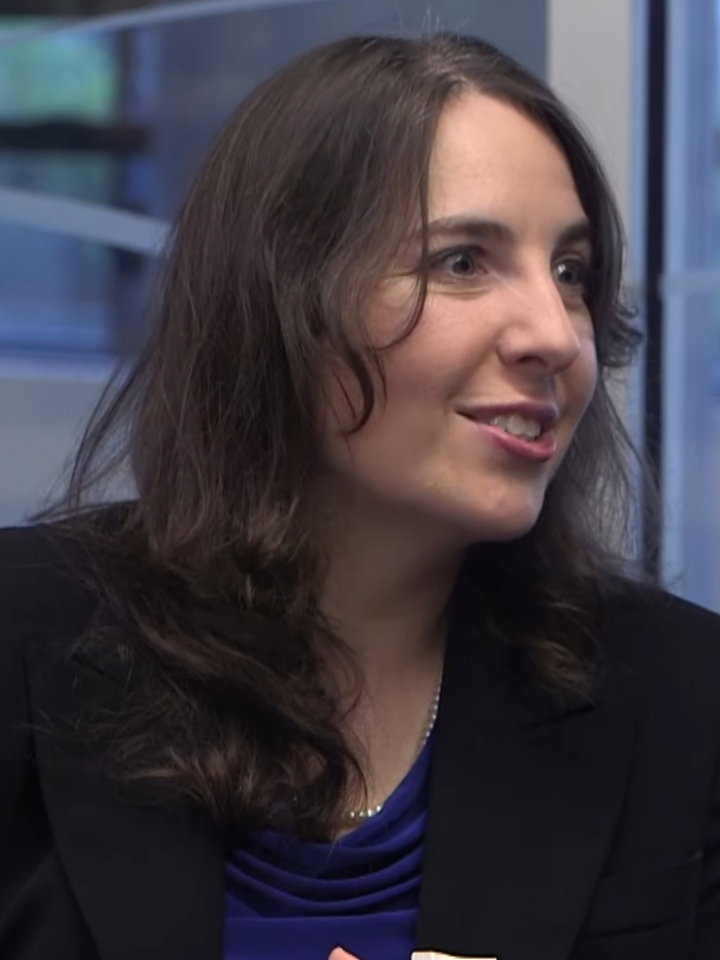

Nominee	Allison Ball	Rick Nelson
Party	Republican	Democratic
Popular vote	571,455	372,416
Percentage	60.6%	39.4%
- Ball: 50–60% 60–70% 70–80% 80–90% Nelson: 50–60% 60–70% 70–80% 80–90%
State Auitor before election
Todd Hollenbach
Democratic
Elected State Auitor
Allison Ball
Republican

Incumbent Democratic State Treasurer Todd Hollenbach was term-limited and could not run for re-election to a third term in office. He had said that he may run for another office in 2015, but did not specify which, and eventually declined to run for another statewide office. He instead successfully ran for an open seat on the Jefferson County District Court, defeating 20 other candidates.

=== Democratic primary ===
==== Candidates ====
Declared

- Neville Blakemore, Executive Chairman of Great Northern Building Products and nominee for Louisville Metro Council in 2006
- Jim Glenn, State Representative and candidate for State Auditor in 2003
- Daniel Grossberg, Jefferson County Commissioner and President of the Louisville Young Democrats
- Richard Henderson, former State Representative and former Mayor of Jeffersonville
- Rick Nelson, state representative

Declined

- Colmon Elridge, aide to Governor Steve Beshear and former Executive Vice President of Young Democrats of America
- Dee Dee Ford-Keene, businesswoman and former President of the Democratic Women's Club of Kentucky
- Chris Tobe, CFA, writer, former trustee of the Kentucky Retirement Systems and former staffer to State Auditor Ed Hatchett

==== Results ====
Democratic primary results
Party	Candidate	Votes	%
Democratic	Rick Nelson	44,397	27.17
Democratic	Neville Blakemore	36,663	22.44
Democratic	Richard Henderson	32,914	20.14
Democratic	Jim Glenn	31,146	19.06
Democratic	Daniel B. Grossberg	18,284	11.19
Total votes		163,404	100.0

=== Republican primary ===
==== Candidates ====
Declared

- Allison Ball, attorney
- Kenny Imes, state representative
- Jon Larson, former Fayette County Judge/Executive, candidate for Attorney General in 2007 and nominee for Kentucky's 6th congressional district in 2008

==== Results ====
Republican primary results
Party	Candidate	Votes	%
Republican	Allison Ball	84,516	46.88
Republican	Jon Larson	55,712	30.91
Republican	Kenny Imes	40,039	22.21
Total votes		180,267	100.0

=== General election ===
==== Polling ====
Poll source	Date(s) administered	Sample size	Margin of error	Rick Nelson (D)	Allison Ball (R)	Other	Undecided
SurveyUSA	October 23–26, 2015	798	± 3.5%	35%	37%	—	25%
WKU	October 19–25, 2015	770	± 3.5%	32%	37%	—	31%
SurveyUSA	September 22–27, 2015	701	± 3.8%	33%	35%	—	28%
SurveyUSA	July 22–28, 2015	685	± 3.8%	36%	33%	—	29%
Public Policy Polling	June 18–21, 2015	1,108	± 2.9%	32%	41%	—	26%
Gravis Marketing	January 5–6, 2015	608	± 4%	32%	34%	—	35%

==== Results ====
Kentucky State Treasurer election, 2015
Party	Candidate	Votes	%
Republican	Allison Ball	571,455	60.6
Democratic	Rick Nelson	372,416	39.4
Total votes		943,871	100.0
Republican gain from Democratic			

== Commissioner of Agriculture ==
2015 Kentucky Commissioner of Agriculture election
- November 3, 2015
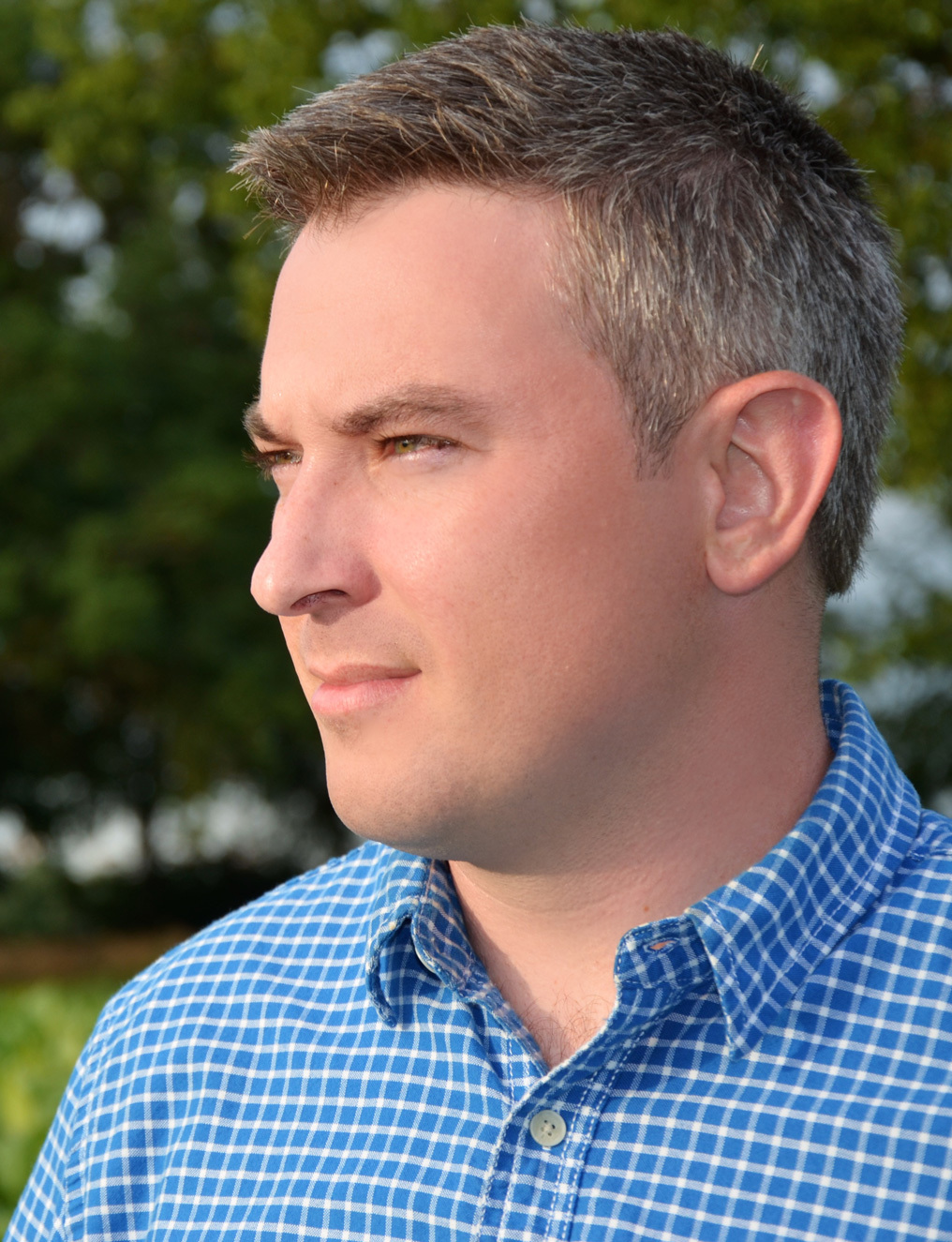

Nominee	Ryan Quarles	Jean-Marie Lawson Spann
Party	Republican	Democratic
Popular vote	563,383	374,402
Percentage	60.1%	39.9%
- Quarles: 50–60% 60–70% 70–80% 80–90% Spann: 50–60%
Agriculture Commissioner before election
Ryan Quarles
Republican
Elected Agriculture Commissioner
Ryan Quarles
Republican

Incumbent Republican Agriculture Commissioner James Comer did not run for re-election to a second term in office. He instead ran for governor, and was defeated by Matt Bevin in the Republican primary.

=== Democratic primary ===
==== Candidates ====
Declared

- Jean-Marie Lawson Spann, businesswoman, radio host and agriculture activist

Declined

- Dennis Parrett, state senator

=== Republican primary ===
==== Candidates ====
Declared

- Richard Heath, state representative
- Ryan Quarles, state representative

Declined

- James Comer, incumbent Agriculture Commissioner
- Paul Hornback, state senator
- Damon Thayer, Majority Leader of the Kentucky Senate

==== Results ====
Republican primary results
Party	Candidate	Votes	%
Republican	Ryan Quarles	92,700	50.39
Republican	Richard Heath	91,273	49.61
Total votes		183,973	100.0

=== General election ===
==== Polling ====
Poll source	Date(s) administered	Sample size	Margin of error	Ryan Quarles (R)	Jean-Marie Lawson Spann (D)	Other	Undecided
SurveyUSA	October 23–26, 2015	798	± 3.5%	40%	33%	—	24%
WKU	October 19–25, 2015	770	± 3.5%	37%	30%	—	33%
SurveyUSA	September 22–27, 2015	701	± 3.8%	34%	31%	—	29%
SurveyUSA	July 22–28, 2015	685	± 3.8%	33%	32%	—	30%
Gravis Marketing	January 5–6, 2015	608	± 4%	39%	31%	—	30%

==== Results ====
Kentucky Agriculture Commissioner election, 2015
Party	Candidate	Votes	%
Republican	Ryan Quarles	563,383	60.1
Democratic	Jean-Marie Lawson Spann	374,402	39.9
Total votes		937,785	100.0
Republican hold			

== Kentucky Supreme Court ==
2015 Kentucky Supreme Court 7th district special election
- November 3, 2015
- District 7
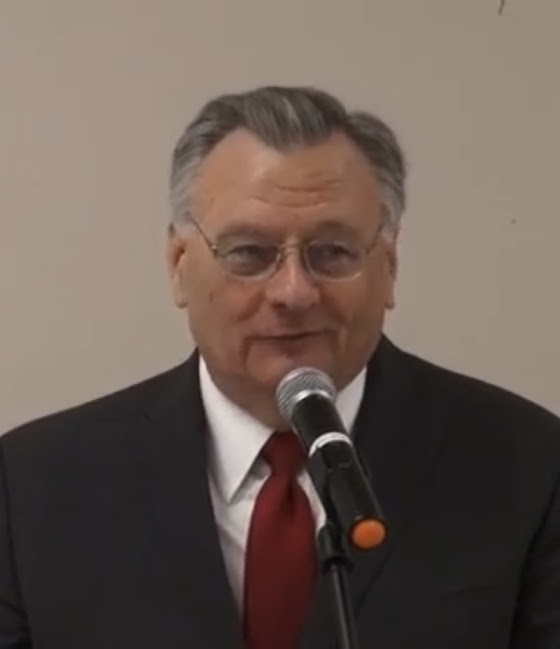

Candidate	Samuel T. Wright III	Janet Stumbo
Popular vote	40,676	37,772
Percentage	51.85%	48.15%
- County results Wright: 50–60% 80–90% Stumbo: 50–60%
Justice before election
David Allen Barber
Elected Justice
Samuel T. Wright III

=== District 7 ===
A non-partisan special election was held along with the May 19, 2015 primary elections to fill the 7th district seat of the Kentucky Supreme Court. The seat was vacated when Justice Will T. Scott resigned to run for governor. The winner of the election was elected to serve the remainder of Scott's term, with the seat coming up for re-election next in 2020.

==== Candidates ====
Declared

- Janet Stumbo, Kentucky Court of Appeals Judge and former Kentucky Supreme Court Justice
- Sam Wright, Kentucky Circuit Court Judge

Withdrew

- John Lewis, Elliott County Attorney

==== Results ====
2015 Kentucky Supreme Court 7th district special election
Candidate	Votes	%
Sam Wright	40,676	51.85
Janet L. Stumbo	37,772	48.15
Total votes	78,448	100.0
