= Chris Ratliff =

American politician

Member of the Kentucky House of Representatives from the 93rd district
- In office January 1, 1997 – January 1, 2001
- Preceded by: Kelsey Friend Jr.
- Succeeded by: Keith Hall

Personal details
- Party: Republican

Christopher T. Ratliff (born March 23, 1964) is an American politician from Kentucky who was a member of the Kentucky House of Representatives from 1997 to 2001. Ratliff was first elected in 1996, defeating Democratic incumbent Kelsey Friend Jr. He ran for the Kentucky Senate in 2000, losing to Democrat Ray Jones II.
