= Sara Walter Combs =

American judge (born 1948)

Chief Judge of the Kentucky Court of Appeals
- In office June 2, 2004 – May 13, 2010
- Preceded by: Tom Emberton
- Succeeded by: Jeff S. Taylor

Judge of the Kentucky Court of Appeals
- Incumbent
- Assumed office January 27, 1994
- Preceded by: Janet Stumbo

Justice of the Kentucky Supreme Court
- In office July 16, 1993 – November 3, 1993
- Appointed by: Brereton Jones
- Preceded by: Dan Jack Combs
- Succeeded by: Janet Stumbo

Personal details
- Born: Sara Mary Walter; August 24, 1948 (age 78)
- Spouse: Bert T. Combs (m. 1988; died 1991) Ernie Dudleson (m. 2015; died 2018)
- Education: University of Louisville (BA, MA, JD)
- Profession: Lawyer
- Known for: First female justice of the Kentucky Supreme Court; first female chief Judge of the Kentucky Court of Appeals
- Awards: Kentucky Bar Association Outstanding Judge of the Year (2010); Women in Law Enforcement Network Lifetime Achievement Award (2014)

Sara Walter Combs (born August 24, 1948) is a judge of the Kentucky Court of Appeals, representing the 7th Appellate District. She was the first woman and the first judge from the 7th district to serve as chief judge of the Court of Appeals, holding that position from 2004 to 2010. She was also the first woman to sit on the Kentucky Supreme Court after being appointed by Governor Brereton Jones to fill a vacancy in 1993. She lost her bid for re-election later that year. She is the widow of former Kentucky Governor Bert T. Combs.

== Early life and education ==
In 1966, Walter graduated as valedictorian of her class at Louisville's Sacred Heart Academy. She matriculated to the University of Louisville, where she earned a Bachelor of Arts degree in French in 1970 and a Master of Arts in French in 1971 as a Woodrow Wilson Designate. Woodrow Wilson National Fellowship Foundation She was valedictorian of her undergraduate class and finished her M.A. degree with a 4.0 grade point average. After graduation, she taught night classes in French at the University of Louisville from 1971 to 1976. She also taught French, Spanish, and political science at Henryville High School in Henryville, Indiana. In 1979, she graduated second in her class at the University of Louisville Brandeis School of Law.

== Legal career ==
Walter started her legal career in 1979 as a law clerk to former Kentucky Governor Bert T. Combs at the Louisville firm of Wyatt, Tarrant & Combs. In a memoir, she admitted a mutual attraction between her and Combs during this time, despite the fact that both were married. In 1982, as rumors of their relationship began to spread, Walter left the firm to become corporate counsel for Louisville-based Naegele Outdoor Advertising, the state's largest billboard firm.

During Walter's time at Naegele, the FBI conducted a three-year investigation of the company for overcharging customers and illegally contributing to the 1983 gubernatorial campaign of Democrat Martha Layne Collins. The scope of the investigation was narrowed after Naegele repaid customers it had overcharged, blaming the discrepancy on a clerical error. In 1987, the company rejected a plea deal on unspecified charges, and the investigation was closed months later with no charged being filed. Of the decision, Walter said, "There was nothing to plead guilty to. The FBI case was entirely the result of misinformation. ... When that was pointed out to them, they dropped the case." Later, statements from Naegele employees were released under a freedom of information request that indicated Walter knew of a scheme to circumvent corporate contributions to political campaigns by reimbursing employees for their contributions to the Collins campaign. Walter steadfastly denied any involvement: "My advice was that no corporate contribution could be permitted."

On December 30, 1988, the 40-year-old Walter married Bert Combs, her 77-year-old former employer. It was the third marriage for each of them. After the wedding, Sara Combs remained with Naegele until she established her own legal practice in Stanton, Kentucky. The couple built a log cabin on Bert Combs' farm, Fern Hill, in Powell County. At about 10:00 p.m. on December 3, 1991, Sara Combs reported to the Kentucky State Police that her husband had left Lexington between 5:30 and 6:00 p.m. that day, but had not yet arrived home. The following morning, the former governor's car was found in Rosslyn Creek on his property. The creek was swollen from the previous night's flooding. By noon, a family friend had discovered his body about 0.5 miles (0.80 km) downstream, snagged on a bush. Authorities said Combs had tried to navigate a flooded road when his car was swept by floodwaters into the creek. Hypothermia was determined to be his cause of death. Combs's will directed that his wife receive $100,000 and the farm, and that the rest of his estate be divided between his two children from his first marriage. Upon his wife's death, her portion of the inheritance was requested but not required to be devised to his grandchildren.

== Political and judicial career ==
Combs opened a solo law practice in Stanton following her husband's death. She also joined the firm of Mapother & Mapother as a regional associate in their Eastern Kentucky office. In June 1992, Democratic Governor Brereton Jones, whose gubernatorial bid Bert Combs had supported, appointed Sara Combs to the state Council on Higher Education for a term ending April 15, 1993. In June 1993, at the suggestion of Governor Jones, Combs announced she would seek appointment to the Kentucky Supreme Court, filling the unexpired term of Justice Dan Jack Combs (no relation), who had announced his retirement effective June 30. The seat, representing the 7th Appellate District, had once been held by her late husband. Jones told WLEX, "I think we need a woman on the Supreme Court", but promised "I will choose the most qualified person in my opinion." At an announcement in the Capitol Rotunda on July 16, 1993, Jones announced Combs' appointment, making her the first female justice in the court's history. She was sworn in immediately by Chief Justice Robert Stephens.

Combs' appointment was criticized because of her husband's ties to Jones and the discouragement of applicants due to a rumor that Jones had already solicited Combs for the appointment. David Welch, a former mayor of Ashland, was one of the applicants passed over for the appointment. He said he began with the belief that the appointment process would be objective, but ultimately concluded that it was an exercise in gender and politics. Many women's rights groups announced their support for Kentucky Court of Appeals Judge Janet Stumbo, who had already declared her candidacy for the November special election to fill the remainder of Combs' term. Combs and Welch also filed as candidates in the special election.

In January 1994, Governor Jones announced that he would appoint Combs to fill the seat vacated by Stumbo on the Kentucky Court of Appeals. Democratic Party Chair Grady Stumbo endorsed Combs' candidacy on the condition that she would not run against Janet Stumbo when her term expired in 1996. Jones appointed Combs to fill the vacancy later that month. To retain her seat, Combs faced a nonpartisan primary election against Pikeville attorney Stephen Hogg and former Knott County attorney Deborah McCarthy. The two top candidates in the primary would be candidates in the general election in November. However, in March, McCarthy dropped out of the race for health reasons, and Combs and Hogg did not have a primary. A week before the election, the Lexington Herald-Leader reported that Hogg, who had a distaste for political campaigning, had raised only $4,625 and spent only $1,317, and none of that in the preceding four months. Combs had spent $26,642 on her campaign. Combs defeated Hogg by a vote of 51,657 to 19,358. She was elected to represent the 7th Appellate District to fill the remaining six years left on Janet Stumbo's term to expire in 2000. She was re-elected in 2006 and 2014. She was unopposed each time.

After Tom Emberton announced his retirement as Chief Judge of the Kentucky Court of Appeals, effective June 2, 2004, Combs was elected his successor by her peers on the court without opposition. She was the first woman and the first judge from the 7th District to hold that office. She continued in that position until May 2010, when she announced she would relinquish the position and return to being a judge of the court. Combs cited cuts in the court's administrative budget as the primary reason for her decision. She also said she would like to write a book.

In 2015, after twenty-five years of widowhood, Judge Combs married Ernie Dudleson, a retired Kentucky State Trooper. She was widowed a second time when Ernie died just three years after their wedding.

Judge Combs continues her work on the Court of Appeals and the care and tending of many pets at Fern Hill.

== Honors ==
The Kentucky Bar Association named Combs its Outstanding Judge of the Year for 2010. In 2012, the University of the Cumberlands awarded her an honorary Doctor of Laws degree. She received the Women in Law Enforcement Network's Lifetime Achievement Award in 2014. She also received the University of Louisville's Distinguished Alumni Award. She served for seven years on the Appalachian Regional Commission and also sat on the boards of directors of Pikeville College (now the University of Pikeville) and Lees College (now part of Hazard Community and Technical College).

== See also ==
- List of female state supreme court justices
- List of first women lawyers and judges in Kentucky
