= Will T. Scott =

American judge (born 1947)

Justice of the Kentucky Supreme Court
- In office January 3, 2005 – January 2, 2015
- Preceded by: Janet Stumbo
- Succeeded by: David Allen Barber

Personal details
- Born: July 20, 1947 (age 79) Pike County, Kentucky, U.S.
- Party: Republican
- Education: Eastern Kentucky University; University of Pikeville; University of Miami

William Thompson Scott (born July 20, 1947) is an American attorney and jurist from Kentucky served as a justice of the Kentucky Supreme Court from 2005 to 2015.

== Biography ==
A Vietnam veteran, he is a recipient of the Bronze Star Medal. He suspended his studies after a year at Eastern Kentucky University to volunteer in 1966, serving as a first lieutenant. After serving, he received a bachelor's degree from Pikeville College and a J.D. degree from the University of Miami in Florida.

Scott previously served as a trial attorney from 1975 to 1980, as an assistant commonwealth's attorney for Pike County from 1981 to 1982 and as a Kentucky Circuit Court judge from 1984 to 1988.

Scott was the Republican Party nominee for Kentucky's 7th congressional district in 1988 and 1990, losing to Democratic incumbent Carl C. Perkins on both occasions. He was also the Republican nominee for Attorney General of Kentucky in 1995, losing to Democrat Ben Chandler.

== Supreme Court tenure ==
Scott was elected to the Kentucky Supreme Court in 2004, defeating incumbent justice Janet Stumbo. On July 1, 2006, Scott replaced retiring Justice Martin E. Johnstone as deputy chief justice of the court, a position he would hold until 2010.

In November 2014, Scott revealed that he was considering running for governor of Kentucky in the 2015 election. On December 29, 2014, he announced that he would resign from the bench effective January 2, 2015. Following his resignation, David Allen Barber was appointed to Scott's former seat until Samuel T. Wright III was elected and replaced him.

In 2018, a portrait of Scott was unveiled for display at the Kentucky State Capitol.

== 2015 gubernatorial election ==
On January 6, Scott announced his candidacy for governor, and selected former Menifee County Sheriff Rodney Coffey to be his running mate on January 13. Scott and Coffey placed last in the 2015 Republican primary election, garnering 15,364 votes (7.2%).

Party political offices
Preceded by Tom Handy	Republican nominee for Attorney General of Kentucky; 1995	Vacant Title next held by Jack D. Wood
