= Craig Richardson =

Kentucky politician (born 1984)

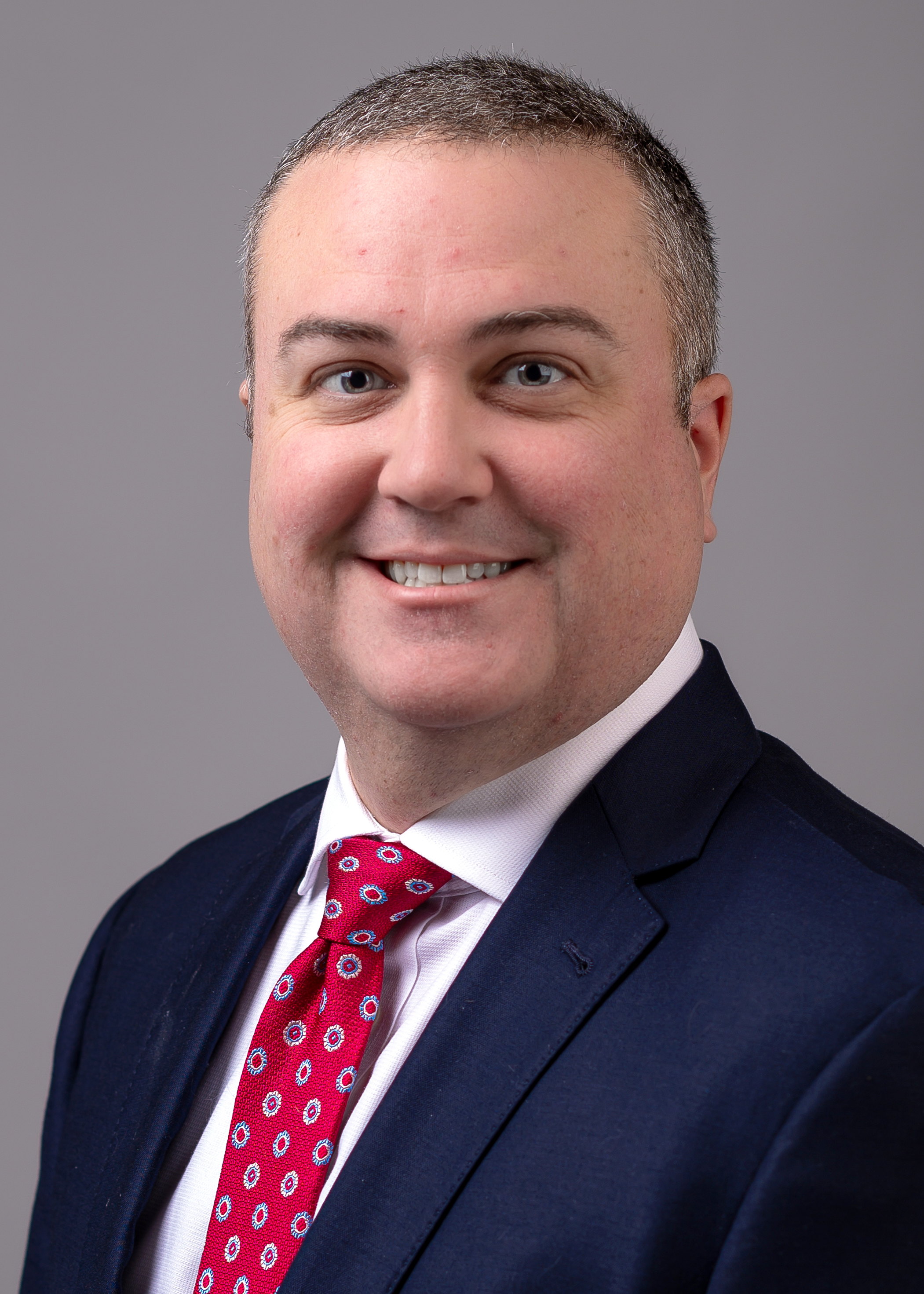
- Official portrait, 2024

Member of the Kentucky Senate from the 3rd district
- Incumbent
- Assumed office January 1, 2025
- Preceded by: Whitney Westerfield

Personal details
- Born: September 28, 1984 (age 41)
- Party: Republican
- Spouse: Katie
- Children: 1
- Education: University of Kentucky (BA); University of Memphis (JD)
- Occupation: Attorney
- Website: Senate website Campaign website

Craig Bartley Richardson (born September 28, 1984) is an American politician who has served as a member of the Kentucky Senate since January 2025. He represents the 3rd district, which includes Caldwell, Christian, and Muhlenberg Counties. He currently serves as the vice chair of the senate Health Services committee.

== Early life and education ==
Richardson was born on September 28, 1984. He is a native of Hopkinsville, Kentucky. He earned a Bachelor of Arts from the University of Kentucky in 2010, and a Juris Doctor from the University of Memphis in 2017. After law school, he returned to Hopkinsville to practice law with his father Michael A. Richardson.

== Political career ==
Richardson was elected unopposed in the 2024 Kentucky Senate election following the retirement of incumbent senator Whitney Westerfield. In the 2025 Kentucky General Assembly, Richardson was appointed to five committees: Agriculture; Appropriations & Revenue; Enrollment; Health Services; and Veterans, Military Affairs, & Public Protection.

=== Legislation ===
Since 2025, Richardson has been a primary sponsor of the following bills which have been considered by at least one house:

| Bill | Title | House Vote | Senate Vote | Governor | Ky. Acts |
|---|---|---|---|---|---|
| 25 SB 28 | An act relating to agricultural economic development and declaring an emergency | Passed 95–0 | Passed 34–0 | Vetoed | 2025 c. 118 |
| 25 SB 28 | An act relating to agricultural economic development and declaring an emergency | Overridden 81–10 | Overridden 32–6 | Vetoed | 2025 c. 118 |
| 25 SB 61 | An act relating to swimming pools (Note: Bill 61 was amended by the house, including changing the title to "An act relating to the regulation of residential property." The senate did not concur in the house's amendments before the legislature adjourned sine die.) | Passed 59–28 | Passed 37–0 | —N/a | —N/a |
| 25 SB 153 | An act relating to prepayment review of Medicaid claims | Not voted | Passed 37–0 | —N/a | —N/a |

== Personal life ==
Richardson and his wife Katie are members of The Church of Jesus Christ of Latter-day Saints. Together they have one daughter. Richardson served as a missionary to Brazil for two years; he is fluent in Portuguese.

Richardson is currently the president of the bar association of Christian County.

== Electoral history ==
=== 2024 ===
2024 Kentucky Senate 3rd district election
| Party | Candidate | Votes | % |
|---|---|---|---|
| Republican | Craig B. Richardson | Unopposed | |
| Total votes | | 31,672 | 100.0 |
| Republican hold | | | |

== Notes ==
Kentucky Senate
| Preceded by Whitney Westerfield | Member of the Kentucky Senate from the 3rd district 2025–present | Succeeded by incumbent |
