= Tom Jensen =

American politician (1948–2026)

Judge of the 27th Kentucky Circuit Court
- In office December 2012 – February 16, 2016
- Preceded by: John Knox Mills
- Succeeded by: Danny Evans

Member of the Kentucky Senate from the 21st district
- In office January 1, 2005 – December 2012
- Preceded by: Albert Robinson
- Succeeded by: Albert Robinson

Minority Leader of the Kentucky House of Representatives
- In office January 8, 1991 – January 3, 1995
- Preceded by: William Strong
- Succeeded by: Danny Ford

Member of the Kentucky House of Representatives from the 85th district
- In office January 1, 1989 – January 1, 1997
- Preceded by: Albert Robinson
- Succeeded by: Tommy Turner
- In office January 1, 1985 – January 1, 1987
- Preceded by: Albert Robinson
- Succeeded by: Albert Robinson

Personal details
- Born: December 29, 1948
- Died: November 4, 2026 (aged 77) London, Kentucky, U.S.
- Party: Republican

Thomas Lee Jensen (December 29, 1948 – November 4, 2026) was an American politician from Kentucky who was a member of the Kentucky House of Representatives, the Kentucky Senate, and the 27th Kentucky Circuit Court.

== Life and career ==
Jensen was first elected to the house in 1984, defeating incumbent Republican representative Albert Robinson for renomination. Robinson challenged Jensen in 1986, defeating him for renomination. Jensen was elected to the house again in 1988 when Robinson unsuccessfully ran for the Kentucky Senate. Jensen did not seek reelection to the house in 1996.

In 2004 Jensen ran for the senate and defeated Robinson for renomination, who had been elected senator in 1994.

In 2012 Jensen was elected to the 27th Kentucky Circuit Court after incumbent judge John Knox Mills resigned to teach at the University of the Cumberlands. He resigned from the court in February 2016 and was replaced by Commonwealth's Attorney Danny Evans.

Jensen died in London, Kentucky, on November 4, 2026, at the age of 77.
