= Clayton Little =

American politician

Member of the Kentucky House of Representatives from the 93rd district
- In office January 1, 1974 – January 1, 1995
- Preceded by: Jim Justice
- Succeeded by: Kelsey Friend Jr.

Personal details
- Born: June 9, 1933
- Died: December 25, 2014 (aged 81)
- Party: Democratic

N. Clayton Little (June 9, 1933 – December 25, 2014) was an American politician from Kentucky who was a member of the Kentucky House of Representatives from 1974 to 1995. Little was first elected in 1973, defeating incumbent representative Jim Justice for renomination. He retired from the house in 1994.

Little died in 2014 at age 81.
