= 2020 Kentucky elections =

Electorate by party registration
Republican
40–50%
50–60%
60–70%
70–80%
80–90%
90–100%
Democratic
40–50%
50–60%
60–70%
70–80%
80–90%

A general election was held in the U.S. state of Kentucky on November 3, 2020.

To vote by mail, registered Kentucky voters must request a paper ballot by October 27, 2020. Submitted ballots will begin to be processed on the morning of November 3.

== Federal offices ==
=== United States President ===
Kentucky had 8 electoral votes in the Electoral College. Republican Donald Trump won all of them with 62% of the popular vote.

=== United States Senate ===
One out of two of Kentucky's United States Senators was up for election. Incumbent Republican Mitch McConnell won re-election with 58% of the votes.

=== United States House of Representatives ===
All 6 of Kentucky's seats in the United States House of Representatives were up for election. 5 Republicans and 1 Democrat were returned. No seats changed hands.

== State offices ==
=== Kentucky Senate ===
19 out of 38 seats in the Kentucky Senate, the odd-numbered districts, were up for election. Out of the contested seats, the Republican Party won 15 while the Democratic Party won 4. The resulting composition was 30 Republicans and 8 Democrats. Republicans gained 2 seats, Districts 7 and 29.

=== Kentucky House of Representatives ===
All 100 seats in the Kentucky House of Representatives were up for election. Republicans won 75 seats while Democrats won 25 seats. Republicans gained 13 seats.

=== Kentucky Supreme Court ===
2020 Kentucky Supreme Court 7th district election
- November 3, 2020
- District 7
Candidate	Robert B. Conley	Chris Harris
Popular vote	90,636	72,691
Percentage	55.49%	44.51%
- County results Conley: 50–60% 60–70% 70–80% Harris: 50–60% 60–70%
Justice before election
Samuel T. Wright III
Elected Justice
Robert B. Conley

The Kentucky Supreme Court consists of 7 justices elected in non-partisan elections to staggered eight-year terms. District 7 was up for election in 2020.

==== Primary election ====
Primary results
Candidate	Votes	%
Robert B. Conley	32,782	39.95
Chris Harris	24,807	30.23
Sam Wright (incumbent)	24,470	29.82
Total votes	82,059	100.0

==== General election ====
2020 Kentucky Supreme Court 7th district election
Candidate	Votes	%
Robert B. Conley	90,636	55.49
Chris Harris	72,691	44.51
Total votes	163,327	100.0

=== Kentucky Court of Appeals (special) ===
A special election was held for the Kentucky Court of Appeals 1st District, 1st Division. The seat was vacated by Christopher S. Nickell who was elected to the Kentucky Supreme Court in 2019. The position was filled in by Chris McNeill who was appointed by Governor Andy Beshear on April 22, 2020.

Kentucky Court of Appeals 1st District, 1st Division special, primary election
Party	Candidate	Votes	%
Nonpartisan	Chris McNeill (incumbent)	35,375	45.15
Nonpartisan	Jenny Hines	26,334	33.61
Nonpartisan	C. Rene Williams	16,642	21.24
Total votes		78,351	100.0

Kentucky Court of Appeals 1st District, 1st Division special, general election
Party	Candidate	Votes	%
Nonpartisan	Chris McNeill (incumbent)	94,869	54.20
Nonpartisan	Jenny Hines	80,178	45.80
Total votes		175,047	100.0

== Local offices ==
=== Mayors ===
Mayors in Kentucky are elected to four-year terms, with cities holding their elections in either presidential or midterm years.

=== City Councils ===
Each incorporated city elected its council members to a two-year term.

=== School boards ===
Local school board members are elected to staggered four-year terms, with half up for election in 2020.

=== Louisville Metro Council ===
The Louisville Metro Council is elected to staggered four-year terms, with even-numbered districts up for election in 2020.

== Ballot measures ==
=== Amendment 1 ===
==== Text ====
Are you in favor of creating a new section of the Constitution of Kentucky relating to crime victims, as proposed in Section 2 below?

IT IS PROPOSED THAT A NEW SECTION BE ADDED TO THE CONSTITUTION OF KENTUCKY TO READ AS FOLLOWS:

To secure for victims of criminal acts or public offenses justice and due process and to ensure crime victims a meaningful role throughout the criminal and juvenile justice systems, a victim, as defined by law which takes effect upon the enactment of this section and which may be expanded by the General Assembly, shall have the following rights, which shall be respected and protected by law in a manner no less vigorous than the protections afforded to the accused in the criminal and juvenile justice systems: victims shall have the reasonable right, upon request, to timely notice of all proceedings and to be heard in any proceeding involving a release, plea, sentencing, or in the consideration of any pardon, commutation of sentence, granting of a reprieve, or other matter involving the right of a victim other than grand jury proceedings; the right to be present at the trial and all other proceedings, other than grand jury proceedings, on the same basis as the accused; the right to proceedings free from unreasonable delay; the right to consult with the attorney for the Commonwealth or the attorney's designee; the right to reasonable protection from the accused and those acting on behalf of the accused throughout the criminal and juvenile justice process; the right to timely notice, upon request, of release or escape of the accused; the right to have the safety of the victim and the victim’s family considered in setting bail, determining whether to release the defendant, and setting conditions of release after arrest and conviction; the right to full restitution to be paid by the convicted or adjudicated party in a manner to be determined by the court, except that in the case of a juvenile offender the court shall determine the amount and manner of paying the restitution taking into consideration the best interests of the juvenile offender and the victim; the right to fairness and due consideration of the crime victim's safety, dignity, and privacy; and the right to be informed of these enumerated rights, and shall have standing to assert these rights. The victim, the victim's attorney or other lawful representative, or the attorney for the Commonwealth upon request of the victim may seek enforcement of the rights enumerated in this section and any other right afforded to the victim by law in any trial or appellate court with jurisdiction over the case. The court shall act promptly on such a request and afford a remedy for the violation of any right. Nothing in this section shall afford the victim party status, or be construed as altering the presumption of innocence in the criminal justice system. The accused shall not have standing to assert the rights of a victim. Nothing in this section shall be construed to alter the powers, duties, and responsibilities of the prosecuting attorney. Nothing in this section or any law enacted under this section creates a cause of action for compensation, attorney's fees, or damages against the Commonwealth, a county, city, municipal corporation, or other political subdivision of the Commonwealth, an officer, employee, or agent of the Commonwealth, a county, city, municipal corporation, or any political subdivision of the Commonwealth, or an officer or employee of the court. Nothing in this section or any law enacted under this section shall be construed as creating: (1) A basis for vacating a conviction; or (2) A ground for any relief requested by the defendant.

==== Results ====
Amendment 1 results by county Yes: 70–80%; 60–70%; 50–60%; No: 50–60%

Constitutional Amendment 1
Choice	Votes	%
For	1,156,883	63.36
Against	668,866	36.64
Total	1,825,749	100.00

=== Amendment 2 ===
==== Text ====
Are you in favor of changing the term of Commonwealth's Attorneys from six-year terms to eight-year terms beginning in 2030, changing the terms of judges of the district court from four-year terms to eight-year terms beginning in 2022, and requiring district judges to have been licensed attorneys for at least eight years beginning in 2022, by amending the Constitution of Kentucky to read as stated below?

IT IS PROPOSED THAT SECTION 97 OF THE CONSTITUTION OF KENTUCKY BE AMENDED TO READ AS FOLLOWS:

In the year two thousand, and every six years thereafter, there shall be an election in each county for a Circuit Court Clerk, and, until the year two thousand thirty, for a Commonwealth's Attorney, in each circuit court district, unless that office be abolished, who shall hold their respective offices for six years from the first Monday in January after their election, and until the election and qualification of their successors. Beginning in the year two thousand thirty, and every eight years thereafter, there shall be an election for a Commonwealth's Attorney in each circuit court district, unless that office be abolished, who shall hold his or her office for eight years from the first Monday in January after his or her election, and until the election and qualification of his or her successor.

IT IS PROPOSED THAT SECTION 119 OF THE CONSTITUTION OF KENTUCKY BE AMENDED TO READ AS FOLLOWS:

Justices of the Supreme Court and judges of the Court of Appeals and circuit court shall severally hold their offices for terms of eight years, and until the year two thousand twenty-two, judges of the district court for terms of four years. Beginning in the year two thousand twenty-two, judges of the district court shall hold their offices for terms of eight years. All terms commence on the first Monday in January next succeeding the regular election for the office. No justice or judge may be deprived of his term of office by redistricting, or by a reduction in the number of justices or judges.

IT IS PROPOSED THAT SECTION 122 OF THE CONSTITUTION OF KENTUCKY BE AMENDED TO READ AS FOLLOWS:

To be eligible to serve as a justice of the Supreme Court or a judge of the Court of Appeals, Circuit Court or District Court a person must be a citizen of the United States, licensed to practice law in the courts of this Commonwealth, and have been a resident of this Commonwealth and of the district from which he or she is elected for two years next preceding his or her taking office. In addition, to be eligible to serve as a justice of the Supreme Court or judge of the Court of Appeals or Circuit Court a person must have been a licensed attorney for at least eight years. Beginning in the year two thousand twenty two, no district judge shall serve who has not been a licensed attorney for at least eight years.

The eight-year licensure requirement for district judges set forth in the amendment to Section 122 of the Constitution shall not apply to any person serving as a district judge on the effective date of this amendment.

==== Results ====
Amendment 2 results by county No: 70–80%; 60–70%; 50–60%

Constitutional Amendment 2
Choice	Votes	%
For	574,585	30.99
Against	1,279,394	69.01
Total	1,853,979	100.00

== See also ==
- Elections in Kentucky
- Politics of Kentucky
- Political party strength in Kentucky
