= Keith Hall (politician) =

American politician and Democratic member of the Kentucky House of Representatives

Member of the Kentucky House of Representatives from the 93rd district
- In office January 1, 2001 – January 1, 2015
- Preceded by: Chris Ratliff
- Succeeded by: Chris Harris

Personal details
- Born: July 3, 1959 (age 67)
- Party: Democratic
- Education: Pikeville College; University of Kentucky

W. Keith Hall (born July 3, 1959) is an American politician and former Democratic member of the Kentucky House of Representatives who represented district 93 from 2001 to 2015. He was defeated for renomination in 2014.

In 2016, he was convicted by the FBI of bribing a state inspector and identity theft and was jailed for seven years.

== Education ==
Hall attended Pikeville College (now the University of Pikeville) and the University of Kentucky.

== Elections ==
- 2012 Hall was unopposed for both the May 22, 2012 Democratic Primary and the November 6, 2012 General election, winning with 10,320 votes.
- 2000 When District 93 Representative Chris Ratliff left the Legislature and left the seat open, Hall won the 2000 Democratic Primary with 3,233 votes (55.4%) and was unopposed for the November 7, 2000 General election, winning with 7,561 votes.
- 2002 Hall was unopposed for both the 2002 Democratic Primary and also the November 5, 2002 General election, winning with 6,962 votes.
- 2004 Hall was challenged in the 2004 Democratic Primary, winning with 2,936 votes (83.5%) and was unopposed for the November 2, 2004 General election, winning with 10,119 votes.
- 2006 Hall unopposed for both the 2006 Democratic Primary and the November 7, 2006 General election, winning with 8,339 votes.
- 2008 Hall was unopposed for both the 2008 Democratic Primary and the November 4, 2008 General election, winning with 10,114 votes.
- 2010 Hall was challenged in the three-way May 18, 2010 Democratic Primary, winning with 5,667 votes (69.3%) and won the November 2, 2010 General election with 6,665 votes (78.8%) against Republican nominee Raul Urias.
