= List of first women lawyers and judges in Kentucky =

This is a list of the first women lawyer(s) and judge(s) in Kentucky. It includes the year in which the women were admitted to practice law (in parentheses). Also included are women who achieved other distinctions such becoming the first in their state to graduate from law school or become a political figure.

== Firsts in Kentucky's history ==
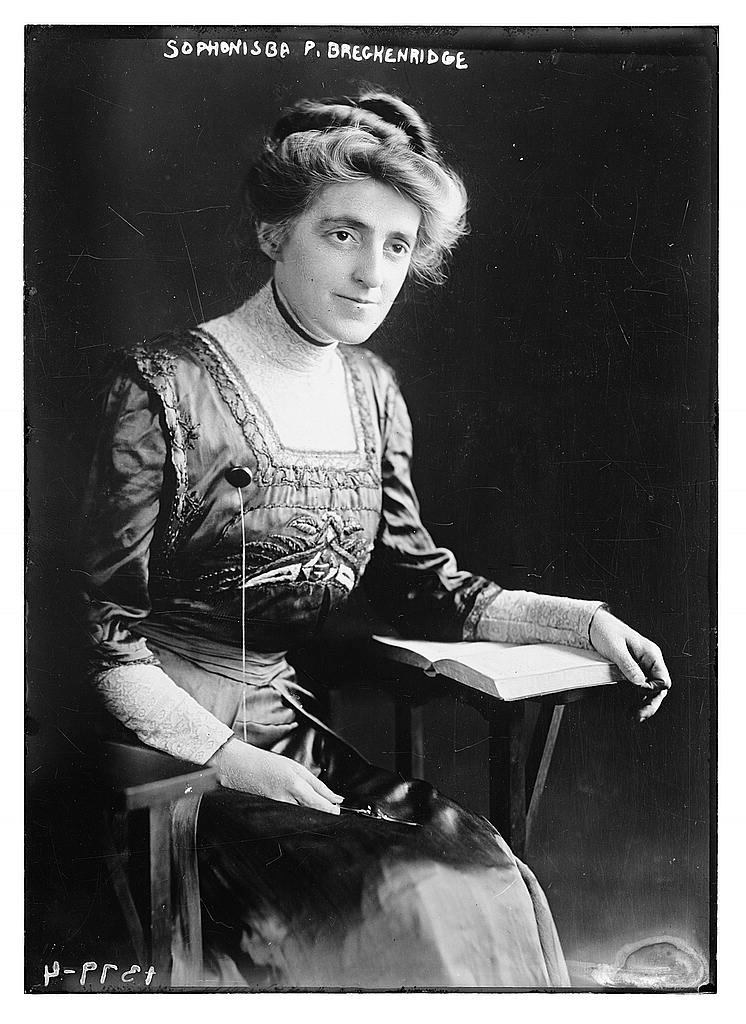
Sophonisba Breckinridge: First female lawyer in Kentucky (1895)

=== Lawyers ===
- First female: Sophonisba Breckinridge (1895)
- First African American female: Sallie J. Seals White (1904)
- First African American female prosecutor: Alberta O. Jones (1959)

=== State judges ===
- First female: Kathleen Mulligan in 1928
- First female (Kentucky Court of Appeals): Judy Moberly West in 1987
- First African American female: Janice R. Martin (1977) in 1991
- First female elected (Kentucky Supreme Court): Janet Stumbo in 1993
- First female to sit (Kentucky Supreme Court): Sara Walter Combs (1979) in 1993
- First female (Sixth Judicial District): Lisa Ann Payne in 2001
- First female (Chief Judge; Kentucky Court of Appeals): Sara Walter Combs (1979) from 2004 to 2010
- First African American female (Kentucky Court of Appeals): Denise G. Clayton in 2007
- First female (Forty-Third Judicial Circuit): Traci Peppers in 2014
- First female (Nineteenth Judicial District Court): Kim Leet Razor in 2018
- First female (Third Supreme Court District of the Supreme Court of Kentucky): Debra Hembree Lambert in 2019
- First African American female (circuit court): Denise G. Clayton
- First Latino American female: Ellie Kerstetter in 2020
- First openly lesbian female (family court): Shelley Santry in 2022
- First African American (female) (Chief Judge; Kentucky Court of Appeals): Denise G. Clayton in 2023
- First African American female (Kentucky Supreme Court): Pamela R. Goodwine in 2024
- First female (Chief Justice, Kentucky Supreme Court): Debra H. Lambert in 2025

=== Federal judges ===
- First female (Eastern District of Kentucky): Julia Kurtz Tackett
- First female (U.S. District Court for the Eastern District of Kentucky; U.S. District Court for the Western District of Kentucky: Jennifer B. Coffman (1978) in 1993

=== Deputy Attorney General ===
- First female: Anne Woods Varble

=== Assistant Attorney General ===
- First female: Blanche Mackey in 1943

=== Commonwealth Attorney ===
- First Native American (female): Lou Anna Red Corn in 2016

== Firsts in local history ==
- Traci Peppers: First female to serve on the Forty-Third Judicial Circuit in Kentucky (Barren and Metcalfe Counties, Kentucky; 2014)
- Kim Leet Razor: First female to serve on the Nineteenth Judicial District Court in Kentucky (2018) [Bracken, Fleming, and Mason Counties, Kentucky]
- Julia Fields: First female to serve as a Judge of the District Court in the Oldham-Trimble-Henry County District, Kentucky (1983)
- Betty Springate (1979): First female lawyer in Anderson County, Kentucky
- Martha Agnes (Gunn) Howle: First female magistrate in Ballard County, Kentucky
- Lynne Pierce Dean: First female to serve as the County Attorney for Boyle County, Kentucky (2017)
- Tina Teegarden: First female judge-executive in Bracken County, Kentucky (2018)
- Rebecca Sue Ward (1986): First female judge in Bullitt County, Kentucky (1999)
- Elvilen Lewis: First female magistrate in Clay County, Kentucky
- Lisa Ann Payne: First female to serve on the Sixth Judicial District in Kentucky (2001) [Daviess County, Kentucky]
- Julia Kurtz Tackett: First female Assistant Commonwealth's Attorney in Fayette County, Kentucky (c. 1974)
- Margaret Kannensohn: First female to serve as the County Attorney for Fayette County, Kentucky (c. 1995)
- Lou Anna Red Corn: First Native American (female) to serve as the Commonwealth Attorney for Fayette County, Kentucky (2016)
- Cassie J. Patrick Allen: First female member of the Floyd County Bar Association, Kentucky
- Phyllis Sharon Bowles (1985): First female admitted to the Hart County Bar Association in Kentucky
- Denise G. Clayton: First African American female to serve as a circuit judge in Jefferson County, Kentucky
- Shelley Santry: First openly lesbian female to serve as a Judge of the Jefferson Family Court (2022)
- Yvette De La Guardia: First Latino American female elected as a District Judge in Jefferson County (2022)
- Rebecca Westerfield: First female to serve as President of the Louisville Bar Association [Jefferson County, Kentucky]
- Ruth Long Wells: First female attorney in Johnson County, Kentucky (1928). Ms. Wells was admitted to the Kentucky Bar in 1928 and was a member of the law firm of Wells & Wells (currently Porter, Banks, Baldwin & Shaw, PLLC) in Paintsville, Kentucky.
- Judy Moberly West: First female to serve on the Kenton County District Court in Kentucky (1980)
- Durenda Lundy Lawson: First female judge in Knox County, Kentucky (2006)
- Fredora P. Lay: First female to serve as the County Attorney for Laurel County, Kentucky (1969)
- Pamela R. Goodwine: First African American to serve as a district court and circuit court judge in Lexington, Kentucky
- Sue Carol Browning: First female judge in Logan County, Kentucky
- Melissa Fannin Phelps: First female to serve as the County Attorney for Martin County, Kentucky (2018)
- Nancy C. Doty: First female elected as a Judge of the Oldham County Fiscal Court (1981–1988)
- Flora Templeton Stuart (c. 1976): First female lawyer to try a case before a jury in Bowling Green, Kentucky [Warren County, Kentucky]
- Amy Hale Milliken: First female to serve as the County Attorney for Warren County, Kentucky (2004)

== See also ==
- List of first women lawyers and judges in the United States

== Other topics of interest ==
- List of first minority male lawyers and judges in the United States
- List of first minority male lawyers and judges in Kentucky
