= Adam Bowling =

American politician

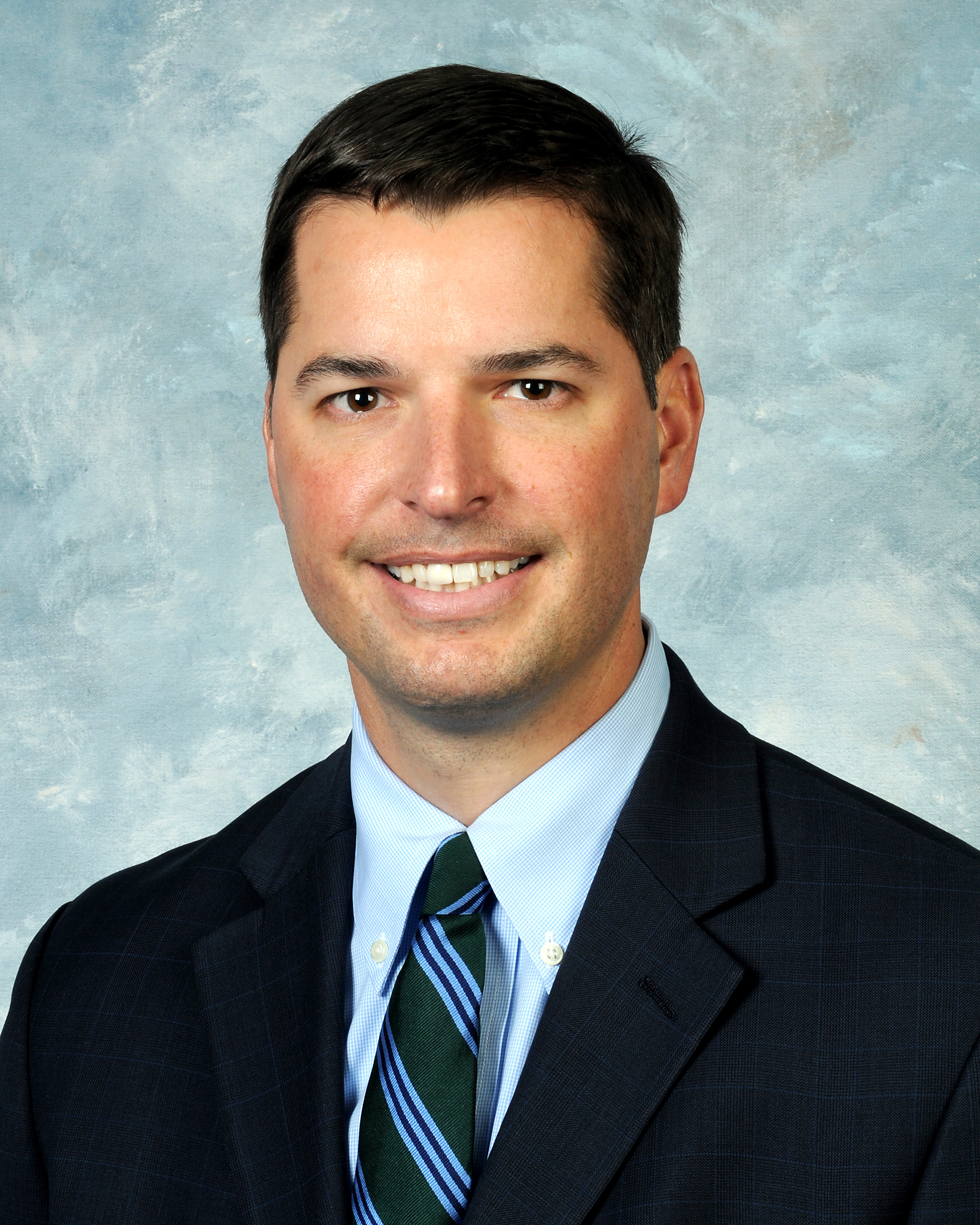
- Official portrait, 2018

Member of the Kentucky House of Representatives from the 87th district
- Incumbent
- Assumed office January 1, 2019
- Preceded by: Rick Nelson

Personal details
- Party: Republican
- Relations: Michael Bowling (father)
- Children: 2
- Education: Wofford College (BA)
- Committees: Appropriations & Revenue (Vice Chair); Economic Development & Workforce Investment; Natural Resources & Energy

Adam Edward Bowling (born February 4, 1982) is an American politician who has served as a Republican member of the Kentucky House of Representatives from Kentucky's 87th House district since January 2019. His district includes Bell County and part of Harlan County.

== Background ==
Bowling was born and raised in Bell County, Kentucky, and comes from a family who has been in the area for six generations. His father, Michael Bowling, served in the Kentucky House of Representatives from Kentucky's 87th House district from 1991 to 1999 and his cousin currently serves as mayor of Middlesboro, Kentucky. He earned a Bachelor of Arts degree in economics from Wofford College in 2004.

Bowling owns and operates several businesses, including PD Specialty Care, Danville Drug Company, Bowkirk Medical, and People's Choice Pharmacy. He also works as a manager at Boone Trace Development and Redbow.

== Political career ==
=== Elections ===
- 2018 Incumbent representative Rick Nelson from Kentucky's 87th House district chose not to seek reelection in order to run for mayor of Middlesboro. Bowling was unopposed in the 2018 Republican primary and won the 2018 Kentucky House of Representatives election with 8,153 votes (75.1%) against Democratic candidate Dustin Allen.
- 2020 Bowling was unopposed in both the 2020 Republican primary and the 2020 Kentucky House of Representatives election, winning the latter with 12,581 votes.
- 2022 Bowling was unopposed in the 2022 Republican primary and won the 2022 Kentucky House of Representatives election with 10,057 votes (83.7%) against Democratic candidate Gary Smith.
- 2024 Bowling was unopposed in both the 2024 Republican primary and the 2024 Kentucky House of Representatives election, winning the latter with 13,490 votes.
