= Albert Robinson (Kentucky politician) =

American politician (1938–2024)

Member of the Kentucky Senate from the 21st district
- In office January 1, 2013 – January 1, 2021
- Preceded by: Tom Jensen
- Succeeded by: Brandon J. Storm
- In office July 1994 – January 1, 2005
- Preceded by: Gene Huff
- Succeeded by: Tom Jensen

Member of the Kentucky House of Representatives from the 85th district
- In office January 1, 1987 – January 1, 1989
- Preceded by: Tom Jensen
- Succeeded by: Tom Jensen
- In office January 1, 1972 – January 1, 1985
- Preceded by: Gene Huff
- Succeeded by: Tom Jensen

Personal details
- Born: December 19, 1938 Clay County, Kentucky, U.S.
- Died: December 2, 2024 (aged 85)
- Party: Republican
- Education: Cumberland College (B.S.)
- Profession: Attorney
- Website: albertrobinsonforstatesenate.com

Albert L. Robinson (December 19, 1938 – December 2, 2024) was an American politician and a Republican member of the Kentucky Senate who represented District 21 from 1994 to 2005 and 2013 to 2021. Robinson previously served in the Kentucky House of Representatives from 1972 to 1985 and 1987 to 1989. He died December 2, 2024, at the age of 85.

== Education ==
Robinson earned his BS from Cumberland College (now the University of the Cumberlands).

== Elections ==
- 2020 Robinson was challenged by Brandon J. Storm and Kay Hensley for the Republican primary. Robinson got second place, losing by 744 votes to Storm meaning he would not be competing in the general election.
- 2016 Robinson defeated Michael Bryant in the Republican Primary and faced Democratic nominee Janice Odom winning with 33,770 votes (75.12%).
- 2012 When District 21 Senator Tom Jensen left the Legislature and left the seat open, Robinson was unopposed for the May 22, 2012, Republican Primary and won the November 6, 2012, general election with 20,490 votes (53.8%) against Democratic nominee Amie Hacker.
- 2004 Robinson was challenged by Tom Jensen in the 2004 Republican Primary and lost; Jensen was unopposed for the November 2, 2004, general election.
- 2000 Robinson was unopposed for the 2000 Republican Primary and won the November 7, 2000, general election with 20,547 votes (58.0%) against Democratic nominee Lawrence Kuhl.
- 1996 Robinson won the three-way 1996 Republican Primary and was unopposed for the November 5, 1996, general election.
