= J. C. Ausmus =

American politician

Member of the Kentucky House of Representatives from the 87th district
- In office January 1, 1999 – January 1, 2001
- Preceded by: Michael Bowling
- Succeeded by: Rick Nelson

Personal details
- Party: Republican

J. C. "Bo" Ausmus III (born 1954) is an American politician from Kentucky who was a member of the Kentucky House of Representatives from 1999 to 2001. Ausmus was elected in 1998 after incumbent representative Michael Bowling retired. He did not seek reelection in 2000.
