= Chris Harris (Kentucky politician) =

American politician

Member of the Kentucky House of Representatives from the 93rd district
- In office January 1, 2015 – January 1, 2021
- Preceded by: Keith Hall
- Succeeded by: Norma Kirk-McCormick

Personal details
- Party: Democratic

Christian R. Harris is an American politician from Kentucky who was a member of the Kentucky House of Representatives from 2015 to 2021. Before his time in the house he was a Pike County magistrate. Harris was first elected to the house in 2014 after defeating incumbent representative Keith Hall in the May primary election. In 2020 he unsuccessfully ran for the Kentucky Supreme Court, losing to Robert B. Conley. He was succeeded by Republican Norma Kirk-McCormick in the house.
