= Rick Nelson (politician) =

American politician (born 1954)

Mayor of Middlesboro
- In office January 7, 2019 – January 2, 2023
- Preceded by: Bill Kelley
- Succeeded by: Boone Bowling

Member of the Kentucky House of Representatives from the 87th district
- In office January 1, 2001 – January 1, 2019
- Preceded by: J. C. Ausmus
- Succeeded by: Adam Bowling

Personal details
- Born: June 11, 1954 (age 71) Black Star Coal Camp, Kentucky, U.S.
- Party: Republican
- Other political affiliations: Democratic (2000–2019); Independent (1998)
- Education: Cumberland College (BS); Eastern Kentucky University (MA)

Rick Gene Nelson (born June 11, 1954) is an American politician who was a member of the Kentucky House of Representatives from 2001 to 2019. He represented the 87th district, which comprised Bell County and part of Harlan. He served as chairman of the Labor and Industry Committee from 2009 until Republicans won control of the house in 2016. He later served as mayor Middlesboro from 2019 to 2023.

He ran for Kentucky state treasurer in the 2015 elections to succeed term-limited Democratic incumbent Todd Hollenbach, but lost to Republican Allison Ball.

Nelson is a Republican candidate for Judge/Executive of Bell County in 2026.

== Education ==
Nelson was born in Black Star Coal Camp, Kentucky. He earned a Bachelor of Science degree from Cumberland College (now the University of the Cumberlands) and a Master of Arts from Eastern Kentucky University.

== Electoral history ==
Electoral history of Kevin Kiley
Year	Office	Primary			General			Result	Swing	Ref.
Year	Office	Total	%	P.	Total	%	P.	Result	Swing	Ref.
1998	Kentucky House of Representatives (87th)	N/A			1,966	17.77%	3rd	Lost	Gain	
2000	Kentucky House of Representatives (87th)	Unopposed			5,853	52.29%	1st	Won	Gain	
2002	Kentucky House of Representatives (87th)	Unopposed			8,017	67.07%	1st	Won	Hold	
2004	Kentucky House of Representatives (87th)	Unopposed			9,095	Unopposed		Won	Hold	
2006	Kentucky House of Representatives (87th)	4,239	63.11%	1st	10,253	78.12%	1st	Won	Hold	
2008	Kentucky House of Representatives (87th)	Unopposed			9,334	Unopposed		Won	Hold	
2010	Kentucky House of Representatives (87th)	Unopposed			9,202	77.52%	1st	Won	Hold	
2012	Kentucky House of Representatives (87th)	Unopposed			8,860	69.57%	1st	Won	Hold	
2014	Kentucky House of Representatives (87th)	Unopposed			9,742	Unopposed		Won	Hold	
2016	Kentucky House of Representatives (87th)	Unopposed			7,224	51.50%	1st	Won	Hold	
2018	Mayor of Middlesboro	981	49.97%	1st	1,785	66.95%	1st	Won	N/A	
2022	Mayor of Middlesboro	792	46.78%	2nd	968	41.19%	2nd	Lost	N/A	

Party political offices
Preceded by Todd Hollenbach	Democratic nominee for Kentucky State Treasurer; 2015	Succeeded by Michael E. Bowman
