= Samuel T. Wright III =

American judge

Samuel T. Wright
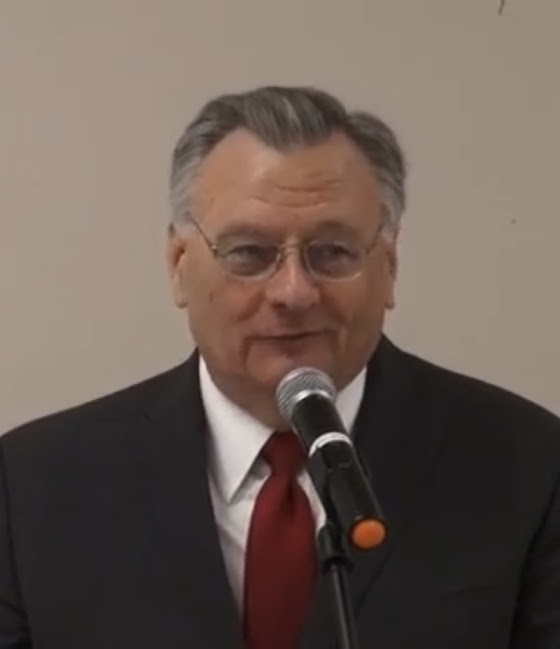
- Wright in 2016

Justice of the Kentucky Supreme Court
- In office December 7, 2015 – January 4, 2021
- Preceded by: David Allen Barber
- Succeeded by: Robert B. Conley

Personal details
- Born: 1955 (age 70–71) Letcher County, Kentucky, U.S.
- Parent(s): S.T. Wright II and Gladys Hall Wright
- Education: Hazard Community College; University of Kentucky College of Law

Samuel T. Wright III (born 1955) is a former justice of the Kentucky Supreme Court. He was elected to the Supreme Court in November 2015, and lost re-election in 2020.

== Early life ==
Wright was born and raised in Letcher County, Kentucky.

== Education ==
He received an associate degree from Hazard Community College and his bachelor's degree from the University of Kentucky. He earned his Juris Doctor from University of Kentucky College of Law.

== Judicial career ==
Wright previously worked as a trial judge for more than 23 years in Letcher County. He was serving in his fourth term as Letcher County Circuit Court judge when he was elected to the Supreme Court.

He was first appointed to fill a vacancy on Circuit Court by Governor Brereton Jones in 1993 and was then elected. Prior to taking the Circuit Court bench, Justice Wright was the District Court judge for Letcher County for a year.

Prior to becoming a judge, Justice Wright was practicing law as an attorney. After graduating law school in 1981, he returned to Eastern Kentucky to join the law firm of Cook and Wright. He went on to open his own law practice in 1989.

== Kentucky Supreme Court ==
In January 2015 Wright filed paperwork to run for a seat on the Kentucky Supreme Court. He was elected on November 3, 2015, defeating his challenger Janet Stumbo, and was sworn in on December 7, 2015. He replaced David Allen Barber, who was appointed in March 2015.

== Personal life ==
Wright and his wife have two sons living in eastern Kentucky. One is a wildlife biologist; as of 2015 the other was studying computer programming.

== Electoral history ==
Source: Commonwealth of Kentucky, For the office of Justice of the Supreme Court, November 3, 2015

Kentucky Supreme Court Seat 7 election, 2015
Party	Candidate	Votes	%
Nonpartisan	Samuel T. Wright III	40,676	51.9
Nonpartisan	Janet Stumbo	37,772	48.1

== See also ==
- List of justices of the Kentucky Supreme Court

Legal offices
Preceded by David Allen Barber	Justice of the Kentucky Supreme Court; 2015–2021	Succeeded by Robert B. Conley
