= Whitney Westerfield =

American politician

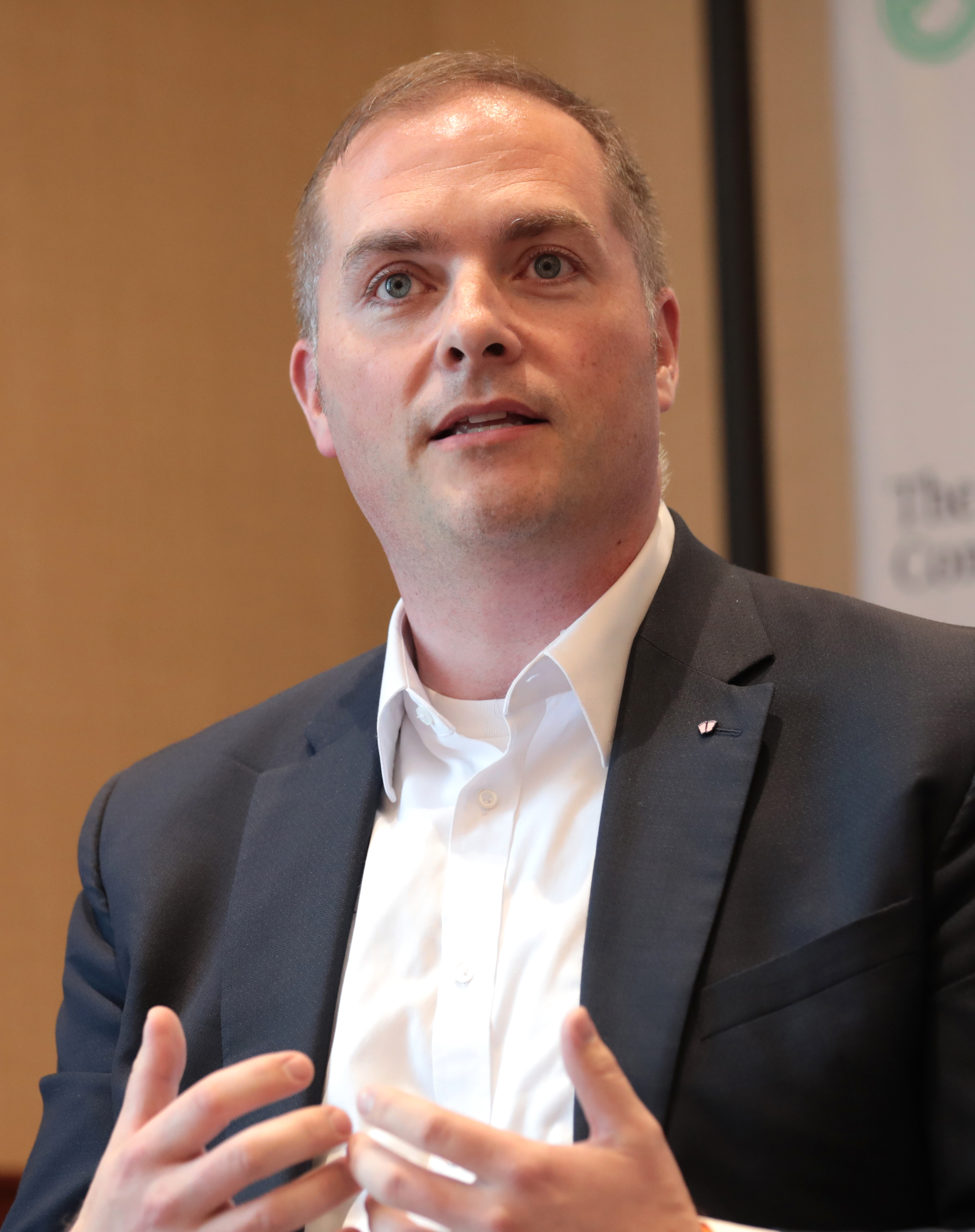
- Westerfield in 2023

Member of the Kentucky Senate from the 3rd district
- In office January 1, 2013 – January 1, 2025
- Preceded by: Joey Pendleton
- Succeeded by: Craig Richardson

Personal details
- Born: November 29, 1980 (age 45)
- Party: Republican
- Education: University of Kentucky; Southern Illinois University, Carbondale
- Website: Campaign website

Whitney Henderson Westerfield (born November 29, 1980) is an American attorney, politician and a Republican member of the Kentucky Senate who represented district 3 from 2013 to 2025. In 2015, Westerfield was the unsuccessful Republican nominee for Attorney General of Kentucky, losing to Democrat Andy Beshear by a margin of 0.2 percent.

== Education ==
Westerfield earned his BS in communication from the University of Kentucky in 2003, and his JD from Southern Illinois University Carbondale in 2006.

== Early career ==
In 2012, Westerfield challenged District 3 incumbent Democratic Senator Joey Pendleton, Westerfield was unopposed for the May 22, 2012, Republican primary and won the November 6, 2012, general election with 18,457 votes (50.4%) against Pendleton. The American Conservative Union gave him a 90% evaluation in 2017.

In 2015, Westerfield ran for Attorney General of Kentucky. He lost to Democrat Andy Beshear by a very narrow margin. Beshear defeated Westerfield by a margin of 0.2 percent, getting 50.1% of the vote to Westerfield's 49.9%. The margin was approximately 2,000 votes.

In 2019, Westerfield ran for Kentucky Supreme Court District 1. He lost the general election to fellow Republican Christopher Shea Nickell.

In 2020, Westerfield ran unopposed in the primary, and drew a Libertarian Party opponent in the General, but was re-elected with nearly 80% of the vote (29,640 to 8,157).

On March 30, 2023, Westerfield announced that he would not seek re-election in 2024.

== Career ==
Westerfield served as chairman of the Senate Judiciary Committee, as well as a member of the Veterans, Military Affairs and Public Protection Committee; the Agriculture Committee; the Natural Resources and Energy Committee; the Child Welfare Oversight and Advisory Committee; the Tobacco Settlement Agreement Fund Oversight Committee; the Budget Review Subcommittee on Justice and Judiciary; and co-chair of the Juvenile Justice Oversight Council. Westerfield serves as a Senate member on a new (2021) Commission on Race and Access to Opportunity, attached to the Kentucky legislature's administrative agency, the Legislative Research Commission. He formerly served on both the Legislative Oversight and Investigations Committee and the Senate Bill 192 (heroin and controlled substance-related legislation) Oversight Committee.

Westerfield was also a member of several caucuses including the Kentucky Sportsmen's Caucus, Western Kentucky Caucus, the Tennessee Valley Authority Caucus, the Pro-Life Caucus, the Aerospace/Aviation Caucus, and the Kentucky Nonprofit Caucus.

After leaving office, Westerfield joined LifeSkills, a nonprofit community mental health center based in Bowling Green, as their director of legal and government affairs.

Westerfield is a lifelong resident of Christian County, Kentucky, and presently maintains a private law practice.

Party political offices
Preceded by Todd P'Pool	Republican nominee for Attorney General of Kentucky; 2015	Succeeded by Daniel Cameron
