= Robert B. Conley =

American judge

Robert Conley

Justice of the Kentucky Supreme Court
- Incumbent
- Assumed office January 4, 2021
- Preceded by: Samuel T. Wright III

Judge of the 20th Kentucky Circuit Court
- In office January 1, 2007 – November 20, 2020
- Preceded by: Lewis D. Nicholls
- Succeeded by: Brian C. McCloud

Judge of the 20th Kentucky District Court
- In office November 1994 – January 1, 2007
- Preceded by: Lewis D. Nicholls
- Succeeded by: Brian C. McCloud

Personal details
- Born: Robert Brian Conley
- Education: University of Kentucky (BS); Northern Kentucky University (JD)

Robert Brian Conley is an American attorney and jurist who has served as a justice of the Kentucky Supreme Court since January 2021, and as deputy chief justice since January 2025.

== Education and early career ==
Conley attended Russell High School in Flatwoods, Kentucky in 1976. He received his Bachelor of Science from the University of Kentucky in 1981 and his Juris Doctor from the Salmon P. Chase College of Law in 1984. While at the University of Kentucky and during his first year in law school, he worked for ARMCO Steel as a steelworker. Prior to his judicial career, he was an associate with the law firm McKenzie, Woolery & Eurick PSC and then as a corporate attorney with Addington Mining/Addington Environmental Inc.

== Judicial career ==
In November 1994, Conley was appointed judge of Kentucky's 20th Judicial District, which is composed of Greenup and Lewis counties, by Governor Brereton C. Jones to a fill a vacancy. He served in this capacity for over ten years before being elected as a circuit judge in 2006. Conley served as circuit judge until his election to the Supreme Court in 2020.

== Kentucky Supreme Court ==
On January 10, 2020, Conley filed to be a candidate for justice of the Kentucky Supreme Court. Conley and his opponent, Chris Harris, both received the most votes in the June primary, advancing them to the general election. During his run for the Kentucky Supreme Court he received a public reprimand from the Kentucky Judicial Conduct Commission in part for jailing a defendant for three days for contempt of court without conducting a hearing. Conley went on to explain his conduct in that case due to extreme fatigue from the flu, saying he said he lost his temper and “it was a bad day". On November 3, 2020, he won the general election against Harris. He was sworn in on January 1, 2021. His term started on January 4, 2021.

== Personal life ==
Conley was married to the late Melanie Stephens Conley for 28 years and is a father of two. Conley has described himself as a Christian conservative.

== Electoral history ==
2020 Kentucky Supreme Court District 7 Election Results source
Year	Non Partisan	Votes	Pct	Non Partisan	Votes	Pct
2020	Robert Conley	90,477	55.5%	Chris Harris	72,425	44.5%

Legal offices
Preceded by Samuel T. Wright III	Justice of the Kentucky Supreme Court; 2021–present	Incumbent
