= Janet Stumbo =

American judge (born 1954)

Judge of the Kentucky Court of Appeals
- In office January 1, 2007 – December 31, 2017
- Preceded by: David A. Barber
- Succeeded by: Gene Smallwood Jr.
- In office December 1, 1989 – November 19, 1993
- Preceded by: Richard L. Elswick
- Succeeded by: Sara W. Combs

Justice of the Kentucky Supreme Court
- In office November 19, 1993 – January 3, 2005
- Preceded by: Sara W. Combs
- Succeeded by: Will T. Scott

Personal details
- Born: Janet Lynn Stumbo; October 21, 1954 (age 71) Prestonsburg, Kentucky
- Spouse: Ned Pillersdorf
- Children: 3
- Education: Morehead State University; University of Kentucky College of Law
- Profession: Lawyer
- Known for: First woman elected to the Kentucky Supreme Court

Janet Lynn Stumbo (born October 21, 1954) is a former justice of the Kentucky Court of Appeals, the second woman to ever serve on the court. From 1993 to 2004, she was an justice of the Kentucky Supreme Court, becoming the first woman elected to that court.

Stumbo graduated from the University of Kentucky College of Law in 1980 and spent nearly a decade practicing law before making her first bid for public office in a special election for a seat on the Kentucky Court of Appeals. During the race, she was criticized for not taking the surname of her husband, but running instead under her maiden name of Stumbo, which is well-recognized in Eastern Kentucky, due to the political careers of former Kentucky House Speaker Greg Stumbo and former gubernatorial candidate Grady Stumbo, both distant relatives. Stumbo won election to the court, but the issue of her last name would continue to be raised in most of her future campaigns. Typically seen as a consumer- and defendant-friendly judge, she was re-elected to the court without opposition in 1991. In 1993, she was elected to the Kentucky Supreme Court, defeating two opponents, including Sara W. Combs, who had become the court's first female justice via an interim appointment by Governor Brereton Jones months earlier.

On the Supreme Court, Stumbo helped establish a family court system in Kentucky. She continued to be sympathetic to defendants' rights, and acquired a reputation as the court's most liberal member. She was re-elected without opposition in 1996, but was narrowly defeated in 2004 by Will T. Scott in a campaign that saw the weakening of restrictions on candidates' statements regarding their views on issues that they might later adjudicate. In 2006, Stumbo defeated incumbent David A. Barber to return to the Court of Appeals. In a rematch of their 2004 race, Stumbo challenged Scott for his seat on the Kentucky Supreme Court in 2012, but lost by over 20,000 votes. In 2014, Stumbo turned back a challenge from Kent Varney to earn another eight-year term on the court.

== Early life and family ==
Janet Stumbo was born October 21, 1954, in Prestonsburg, Kentucky. Her father, Charles Stumbo, was a hospital official. She is a distant cousin of Kentucky Speaker of the House Greg Stumbo and Grady Stumbo, a former Kentucky gubernatorial candidate.

During Stumbo's childhood, the family moved to the Floyd County community of Left Beaver Creek, where Charles worked for McDowell Appalachian Regional Hospital. When Janet was 10 years old, the family moved to Williamson, West Virginia, when Charles took a job at Williamson Appalachian Regional Hospital in South Williamson, Kentucky. Janet attended grade school in West Virginia, but the family later moved to South Williamson, and Janet graduated from Belfry High School in 1972.

After graduation, Stumbo enrolled at Morehead State University as an art major, but ultimately earned a bachelor's degree in literature and linguistics in 1976. She completed one year of graduate school at the University of Kentucky before being accepted into the College of Law, where she earned a juris doctor in 1980. She began her legal career as a staff attorney for appellate court judge Harris Howard. In 1982, she entered the law firm of Turner, Hall & Stumbo in Floyd County. She specialized in divorces, workers' compensation, federal black lung claims, and personal injury cases. Arnold Turner, one of the partners in the firm, was then serving as county attorney for Floyd County, and Stumbo served as his assistant from 1982 to 1986. In 1983, she joined the board of directors of the Appalachian Research and Defense Fund of Kentucky, which provides legal services for poor residents of Eastern Kentucky. The following year, she was named chair of the board, a post she held until 1989. In 1989, she joined her husband in the law firm of Stumbo, DeRossett & Pillersdorf.

Stumbo married Ned Pillersdorf in 1984; they have three daughters – Sarah, Nancee and Samantha. Because she was already part of a law firm that incorporated her maiden name, Stumbo chose not to take her husband's surname after their marriage.

== Political career ==
=== Kentucky Court of Appeals (1989–1993) ===
Stumbo made her first bid for elective office in 1989 as a candidate in the special election to fill one of the 7th Appellate District's seats on the Kentucky Court of Appeals, which was vacated when Dan Jack Combs was elected to the Kentucky Supreme Court. Her opponents in the non-partisan primary election were Richard L. Elswick, who had been appointed by Governor Wallace Wilkinson to fill the vacancy on an interim basis; and Barkley J. Sturgill, chair of the Kentucky Public Service Commission. In the primary, Stumbo received 31,906 votes to Sturgill's 27,065 and Elswick's 19,388. That set up a general election in November between Stumbo and Sturgill.

In September, Grady Stumbo appeared in an ad endorsing Sturgill, saying, "It's getting the message out that not all Stumbos are for [Janet Stumbo]," a reference to himself and then-State Representative Greg Stumbo. Sturgill suggested that Stumbo won the primary, in part, because voters confused her with Grady Stumbo's wife, whose name is Jan. Sturgill said Stumbo should use her husband's last name, "We believe you ought to use your man's name. People ought to know that legally she's not a Stumbo. She's Ned Pillersdorf's wife." Janet Stumbo called Sturgill's suggestion, "just the craziest thing I've ever heard", adding, "This is the 1980s. As a modern woman with a separate identity from my husband, I see no reason to change my name simply because my marital status has changed."

In the general election, Stumbo garnered 46,895 to Sturgill's 41,973. As a result of her win, Stumbo became the second woman to serve on the court, and the first to be elected to the court without first having been appointed. She took the oath of office on December 1, 1989. The partial term to which she was elected expired at the end of 1991. She was unopposed for election to a full, eight-year term. The Lexington Herald-Leader wrote that Stumbo generally sided with consumers and workers against businesses and with defendants in criminal law cases, but noted that there were exceptions. In what the paper called "her most criticized ruling", she found that, under a literal reading of Kentucky law, a litigant who had been injured in an automobile accident could not collect damages unless there was a court ruling that found the other driver in the accident to be negligent. The Kentucky Supreme Court reversed this decision, saying Stumbo should have considered the legislature's intent. Stumbo also halted refund payments ordered by a lower court in a finding against Louisville Gas & Electric (LG&E) in a rate dispute, saying the court had no power to set utility rates. She returned the case to the Public Service Commission, but also scolded two of the commissioners for secretly meeting with LG&E about the settlement terms.

=== Kentucky Supreme Court (1993–2004) ===
When Dan Jack Combs announced in mid-1993 that he would retire from the Kentucky Supreme Court for health reasons, Stumbo declared her candidacy for the November special election to succeed him. She announced she would not seek the interim appointment to the seat from Governor Brereton Jones because she would have to resign her seat on the Court of Appeals and could subsequently lose the November election for the remainder of Combs' term. The appointment went to Sara W. Combs, the widow of former Governor Bert T. Combs but no relation to the retiring justice, making her the first woman to sit on the Kentucky Supreme Court. Combs also filed as a candidate in the November special election, as did former Ashland mayor David Welch.

In August, state Democratic Party chair Grady Stumbo endorsed Janet Stumbo's candidacy, and in October, she won the endorsement of the United Mine Workers of America. State Treasurer Francis Jones Mills recorded an ad endorsing Combs in October. Both Janet Stumbo and Welch complained that the endorsement was an illegal partisan activity into a non-partisan election. Combs pulled the ad from the radio, but responded that, "I don't think there could be anything more partisan and political than Grady Stumbo's conduct," referring to his earlier endorsement of his distant cousin. Janet Stumbo maintained that the two situations were different because she had neither sought nor publicized Grady Stumbo's endorsement.

Stumbo won the special election, capturing 46,152 votes to Combs' 39,234 and Welch's 20,755. Combs raised and spent almost twice as much money as Stumbo in the race but said Stumbo's superior political organization, still in place from her 1989 campaign, made the difference. The Kentucky Post also noted that Stumbo carried Floyd and Pike counties, two of the most populous in the district, and both places Stumbo had lived. With the win, Stumbo became the second woman to serve on the court and the first to be elected to it without being appointed first. She was officially sworn in at a private ceremony on November 19, 1993, but held a larger, public ceremony December 4 at the Floyd County Courthouse. Governor Jones subsequently appointed Combs to the seat Stumbo had vacated on the Court of Appeals.

Stumbo was re-elected without opposition to a full, eight-year term in 1996. While on the court, Chief Justice Robert F. Stephens appointed her chair of the Family Court Consortium, which carried out a successful family court pilot project. As a result of the pilot, the Kentucky Constitution was amended to create a statewide family court system. Stumbo also chaired the Civil Rules Committee during her time on the court. The Lexington Herald-Leader noted that early in Stumbo's career, she shared some of the "libertarian" views as Dan Jack Combs, the justice she replaced on the court. In her last five years on the court, however, she voted to overturn convictions 62% of the time, and became known as the court's most liberal justice.

In 2004, Stumbo faced a re-election challenge from Will T. Scott. Scott revived complaints about Stumbo's use of her well-known maiden name in her political races: "She signs documents, deeds and mortgages as Janet Stumbo Pillersdorf, but I have to run against her as Justice Janet Stumbo." Scott said he had previously been defeated in political races by candidates who benefited from their famous name associations – Chris Perkins, son of longtime U.S. Representative Carl D. Perkins; and Ben Chandler, grandson of two-time former Governor and U.S. Senator A. B. "Happy" Chandler.

Scott also aired commercials criticizing many of Stumbo's decisions on the Supreme Court, including upholding legislation to end workers' compensation payments when the payee reached 65 years old, overturning a murder conviction that was eventually confirmed, and absolving from criminal liability a drunken driver who killed an unborn child in an automobile accident and a mother whose child was abused by her boyfriend. Stumbo countered that, not only did the ads misrepresent her rulings, but they violated the state judicial code of conduct by indicating how Scott might rule on a case before it comes before him on the bench. A federal district court ruling struck down that portion of the code of conduct before the election. Scott won the election with 80,057 votes to Stumbo's 77,631.

=== Interim and return to the Court of Appeals ===
After leaving the court, Stumbo taught courses for the University of Kentucky College of Law and the Appalachian School of Law. She also taught a mock trial class at a summer camp for high school students at Western Kentucky University.

In 2006, Stumbo filed as a candidate for the Kentucky Court of Appeals against incumbent Justice David A. Barber. During the campaign, Barber's name was among those published by The Floyd County Times as being delinquent on their property taxes. Stumbo called on Barber to cease fundraising for his campaign until his tax debt was paid. Barber expressed surprise at the delinquency, saying his taxes were handled by a third party, and the Floyd County Attorney's Office confirmed that Barber had contacted them after the story broke to arrange payment. Stumbo also demanded that Barber reimburse Prestonsburg High School for $6,630 in fines levied against the school by the Kentucky High School Athletic Association for allegations that Barber had helped the school recruit two football players to transfer to Prestonsburg from their previous schools for athletic reasons. Barber admitted helping the students transfer, but denied that athletics were the reason.

The Kentucky Judicial Campaign Conduct Committee admonished both candidates during the campaign. The Committee said Stumbo had not updated her campaign website in a timely manner to reflect the fact that Barber had paid his delinquent property taxes. They also said that Barber's campaign ads misrepresented Stumbo's opinions in two child abuse and fetal homicide cases that had also been central to Scott's previous campaign against her. Stumbo won the general election by 30,000.

In November 2011, Stumbo announced she would challenge Scott for his seat on the Kentucky Supreme Court when his term expired in 2012. Both Stumbo and Scott signed a pledge authored by the Kentucky Judicial Campaign Committee to run a dignified campaign, and both agreed on the need to reinstate funding for statewide adult and juvenile drug courts that had been recently reduced. By October, the Committee had again criticized the campaign tactics of both candidates. They said an ad by Scott referencing Stumbo's vote to overturn convictions of two black men accused of murdering a pregnant white woman was misleading because the women depicted in the ad were not related to the case, and the juxtaposition of black defendants with white victims carried racial overtones. Stumbo's ad claimed Scott had voted against the conviction of a man who had confined his three children to a locked room without food, water, or bathrooms while he slept; the Committee said the ad exaggerated some of the facts in the case.

Again, Scott raised the issue of Stumbo's use of her maiden name, citing a marketing firm's estimate using the Stumbo name "gives [Janet Stumbo] an artificial advantage that benefits her by approximately 4.9 percent of the vote". Scott said Stumbo had the prerogative to run under her maiden name, but he raised the issue only to clarify it for voters. Scott won re-election with a vote of 86,725 to 62,416.

With her term set to expire in 2014, Stumbo filed for re-election and drew a challenger in Pikeville attorney Kent Varney. Stumbo turned back Varney's challenge by a margin of almost 2-to-1. Stumbo retired from the court in January 2018.

== Honors ==
Morehead State University inducted Stumbo into its Alumni Association Hall of Fame in 1990. The Kentucky Women Advocates presented her the 1991 Justice Award for her work in establishing a women's shelter in Floyd County, her recognition of battered wife syndrome as a legal defense, and her decision to set aside a divorce settlement based on evidence of spousal abuse. In 1995, the organization honored her with its Outstanding Justice Award for her "courageous service on the male-dominated Kentucky Supreme Court" and for pushing the court to broaden the guidelines under which parties could complain to the Retirement and Removal Commission about judges who show bias or allow their staff members to show bias on the basis of gender, race, religion, national origin, disability, age, sexual orientation or socioeconomic status. She received the Bull's Eye Award from the Women in State Government Network in 1995, and in 1996, she was the first-ever recipient of the Kentucky Bar Association for Women's Women Lawyers of Achievement Award, which recognizes excellence in the practice of law and progress in opening the legal field to more women.

Stumbo was inducted into the University of Kentucky College of Law Alumni Hall of Fame in 1999. She received an honorary doctor of public service degree from Morehead State University in 2000.

== See also ==
- List of first women lawyers and judges in Kentucky
