= Kentucky Bar Association =

Bar Association

- Type: Legal Society
- Headquarters: Frankfort, KY
- Location: United States
- Members: 18,908 in 2020
- Website: http://www.kybar.org/

The Kentucky Bar Association (KBA) is the integrated (mandatory) bar association of the U.S. state of Kentucky.

== History ==
In 1871, the first meeting of lawyers from across Kentucky was held in Louisville and created a voluntary association. In 1934 the Kentucky General Assembly passed an act creating an all-inclusive bar association which authorized the Court of Appeals (now Supreme Court) to adopt and promulgate rules and regulations defining the practice of law and to establish a code of professional responsibility to govern the discipline of members of the Bar.

== Structure ==
The KBA governing body is its Board of Governors, an agent of the Court for the purpose of administering and enforcing the Rules. KBA's Chief Executive Officer is the President of the Bar.

In 1984 KBA developed its Kentucky Law Update program, enabling members the opportunity to meet the annual Continuing Legal Education requirement with no registration fee. The absence of a registration fee is mandated by the Supreme Court of Kentucky. In addition, the Supreme Court requires that the program be offered in each of the court's seven appellate districts; it is currently offered in nine different locations.

== Sections ==
The KBA offers a total of 25 specialized sections. Of these, 23 are focused on a specific area of law. The Small Firm Practice Section is centered on the needs of members practicing solo and in small firms. The final section, the Young Lawyers Division, is open to all KBA members who are under 40 as of the start of the membership year (which begins on 1 July), and also to members who have been admitted to the bar for 10 years or less (also measured as of 1 July) regardless of age.
