= 2015 Kentucky Secretary of State election =

- November 3, 2015
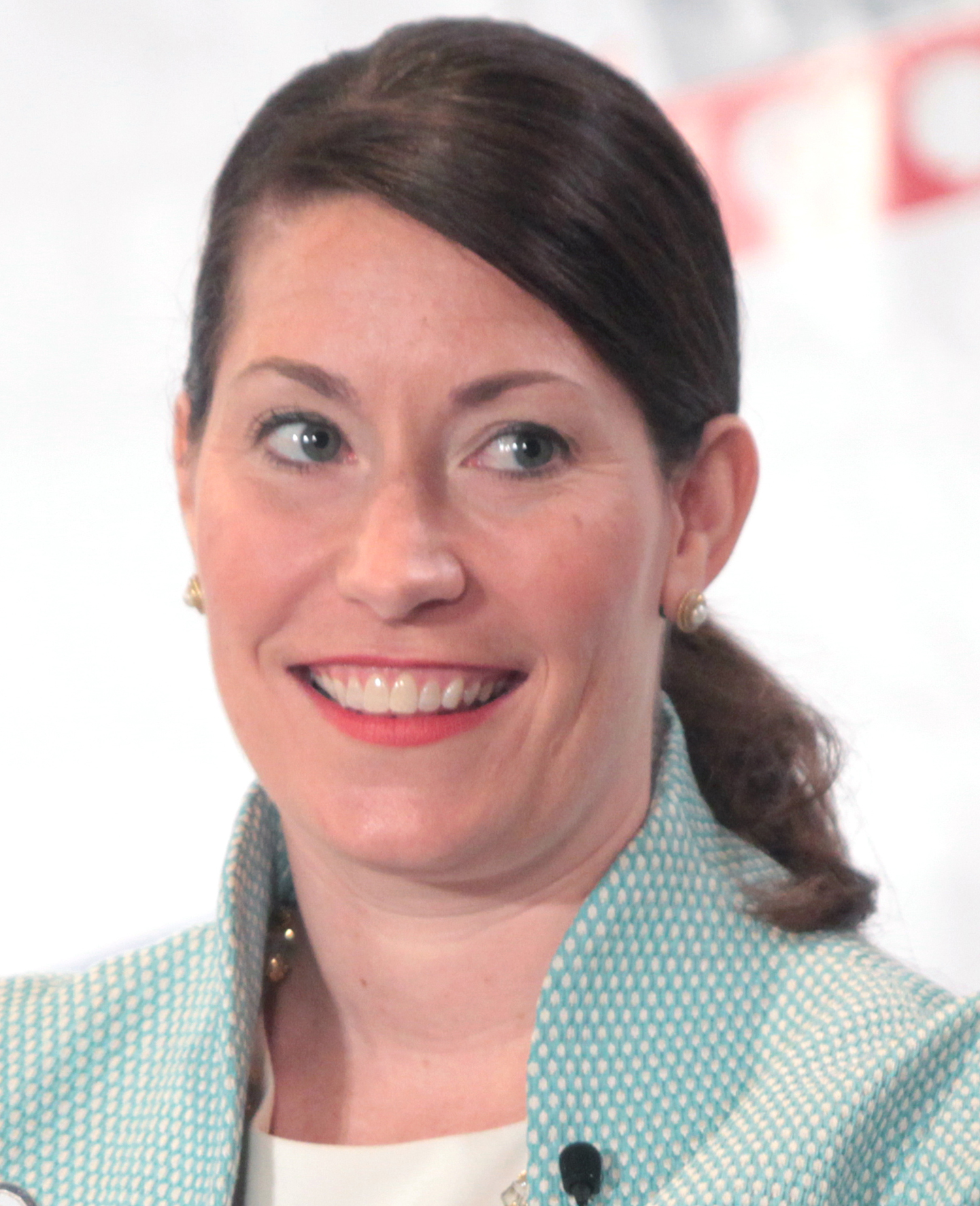

Nominee	Alison Lundergan Grimes	Steve Knipper
Party	Democratic	Republican
Popular vote	493,204	470,894
Percentage	51.2%	48.8%
- Lundergan Grimes: 50–60% 60–70% 70–80% 80–90% Knipper: 50–60% 60–70% 70–80%
Secretary of State before election
Alison Lundergan Grimes
Democratic
Elected Secretary of State
Alison Lundergan Grimes
Democratic

The 2015 Kentucky Secretary of State election was held on November 3, 2015, to elect the Secretary of State of Kentucky. Primary elections were held on May 19, 2015. Incumbent Democratic Secretary Alison Lundergan Grimes narrowly won re-election to a second term against Republican nominee Steve Knipper.

== Democratic primary ==
=== Candidates ===
==== Nominee ====
- Alison Lundergan Grimes, incumbent Secretary of State

==== Eliminated in primary ====
- Charles Lovett, candidate for Jefferson County Justice of the Peace in 2010

==== Declined ====
- Colmon Elridge, aide to Governor Steve Beshear and former Executive Vice President of Young Democrats of America
- David O'Neill, Fayette County Property Valuation Administrator

=== Results ===
Primary results by county: Lundergan Grimes: 50–60%; 60–70%; 70–80%; 80–90%

Democratic primary results
Party	Candidate	Votes	%
Democratic	Alison Lundergan Grimes (incumbent)	131,654	73.24%
Democratic	Charles Lovett	48,096	26.76%
Total votes		179,750	100.00%

== Republican primary ==
=== Candidates ===
==== Nominee ====
- Steve Knipper, former Erlanger city councilor

==== Withdrawn ====
- Michael Pitzer, business consultant

==== Declined ====
- Michael Adams, attorney and general counsel for the Republican Governors Association
- Matt Bevin, businessman and candidate for U.S. Senate in 2014 (ran for governor)
- Ken Fleming, former Louisville Metro Council member
- Damon Thayer, Majority Leader of the Kentucky Senate

== General election ==
=== Endorsements ===
Alison Lundergan Grimes (D)
- The Courier-Journal

=== Polling ===
Poll source	Date(s) administered	Sample size	Margin of error	Alison Lundergan Grimes (D)	Steve Knipper (R)	Undecided
SurveyUSA	October 23–26, 2015	798	± 3.5%	50%	37%	12%
WKU Social Science Research Center	October 19–25, 2015	770	± 3.5%	46%	35%	19%
Mason-Dixon Polling & Research	October 6–8, 2015	625	± 4.0%	47%	45%	8%
SurveyUSA	September 22–27, 2015	701	± 3.8%	46%	38%	15%
SurveyUSA/Bluegrass Poll	July 22–28, 2015	685	± 3.8%	46%	40%	12%
Public Policy Polling	June 18–21, 2015	1,108	± 2.9%	42%	47%	12%
Gravis Marketing	January 5–6, 2015	608	± 4.0%	47%	46%	7%

=== Results ===
2015 Kentucky Secretary of State election
Party	Candidate	Votes	%	±%
Democratic	Alison Lundergan Grimes (incumbent)	493,204	51.16%	–9.47
Republican	Steve Knipper	470,894	48.84%	+9.47
Total votes		964,098	100.00%	
Democratic hold				

=== By congressional district ===
Lundergan Grimes won two of six congressional districts, including one that elected a Republican.

District	Lundergan Grimes	Knipper	Representative
1st	47%	53%	Ed Whitfield
2nd	48%	52%	Brett Guthrie
3rd	64%	36%	John Yarmuth
4th	43%	57%	Thomas Massie
5th	43%	57%	Hal Rogers
6th	58%	42%	Andy Barr
