= 2026 Louisville mayoral election =

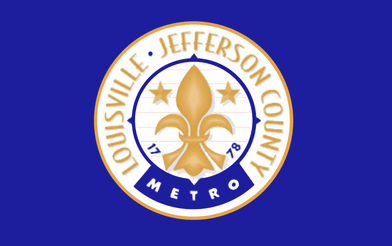
- November 3, 2026
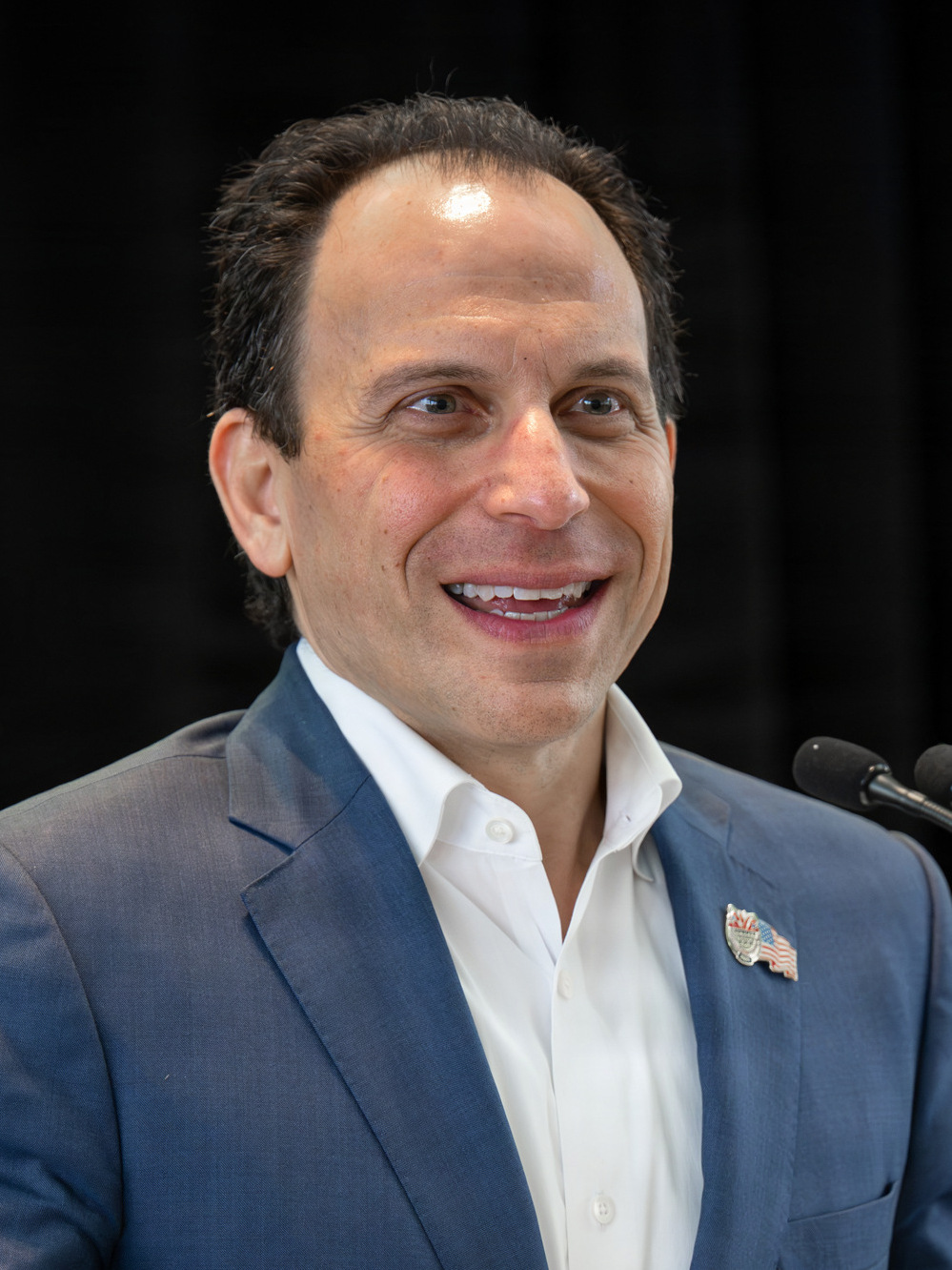

Candidate	Craig Greenberg	Shameka L. Parrish-Wright
Popular vote	130,671	96,272
Percentage	55.54%	40.92%
mayor before election
Craig Greenberg
Democratic
Elected mayor
Craig Greenberg
Democratic

The 2026 Louisville mayoral election was held on November 3, 2026, to elect the mayor of Louisville, Kentucky. The primary election was held on May 19, with incumbent mayor Craig Greenberg, who was first elected in 2022, advancing to the general election alongside Louisville Metro councilor Shameka L. Parrish-Wright. Greenberg was elected to a second term with 56 percent of the vote.

Following a 2024 change in the election law by the Kentucky General Assembly, this was the first nonpartisan mayoral election in Louisville, though both Greenberg and Parrish-Wright are members of the Democratic Party.

== Candidates ==
=== Advanced to general ===
- Craig Greenberg, incumbent mayor (2023–present)
- Shameka L. Parrish-Wright, Louisville Metro councilor from the 3rd district (2024–present) and candidate for mayor in 2022

=== Eliminated in primary ===
- Matthew Soloman Bailey
- Tina Burnell
- Stephen Dattilo, repair technician and candidate for Louisville Metro Council in 2022
- Bob DeVore, former McCreary County Board of Education member (2001–2007) and perennial candidate (Note: Candidate for Kentucky's 16th Senate district in 2006; candidate for Kentucky's 3rd congressional district in 2008, 2012, 2016, and 2022; candidate for Kentucky's 46th House district in 2010 and nominee in 2020 and 2024; Republican nominee for Mayor of Louisville in 2014 and candidate in 2018; candidate for governor of Kentucky in 2023)
- Lisa M. Holliday Harris
- Jody Hurt
- Douglas Lattimore

=== Declined ===
- Charles Booker, former state representative from the 43rd district (2019–2021), candidate for U.S. Senate in 2020 and nominee in 2022 (running for U.S. Senate)

=== Withdrawn ===
- JusAustin Lane
- Bill Wells (remained on ballot)
- Jeffrey Yocum, U.S. Navy veteran (remained on ballot)

== Primary election ==
=== Endorsements ===
Craig Greenberg

U.S. representatives

- Morgan McGarvey, KY-03 (2023–present)

Statewide officials

- Andy Beshear, governor of Kentucky (2019–present)
- Jaqueline Coleman, lieutenant governor of Kentucky (2019–present)

State legislators

- Karen Berg, SD-26 (2020–present)
- Cassie Chambers Armstrong, SD-19 (2023–present)
- Gary Clemons, SD-37 (2026–present)
- Gerald Neal, Senate minority leader (2023–present) from SD-33 (1989–present)
- Tina Bojanowski, HD-32 (2019–present)
- Al Gentry, HD-46 (2017–present)
- Rachel Roarx, HD-38 (2023–present)
- Sarah Stalker, HD-34 (2023–present)

Local officials

- 8 Louisville Metro councilmembers

Labor unions

- Bricklayers and Allied Craftworkers Local 4
- Greater Louisville Central Labor Council
- International Association of Fire Fighters Local 54
- International Brotherhood of Electrical Workers Local 369
- United Auto Workers

Organizations

- Democratic Mayors Association
- Fairness Campaign (co-endorsement with Parrish-Wright)

Political parties

- Louisville Democratic Party
Shameka Parrish-Wright

Organizations

- Fairness Campaign (co-endorsement with Greenberg)
- Kentuckians for the Commonwealth
- Louisville Democratic Socialists of America
- Louisville Showing Up for Racial Justice
- Planned Parenthood Kentucky

=== Results ===
Primary election results
Candidate	Votes	%
Craig Greenberg (incumbent)	74,836	52.5
Shameka L. Parrish-Wright	37,490	26.3
Tina Burnell	14,227	10.0
Bob DeVore	5,880	4.1
Lisa M. Holliday Harris	3,406	2.4
Jody Hurt	2,392	1.7
Douglas Lattimore	1,872	1.3
S. "The D" Dattilo	1,281	0.9
Matthew Soloman Bailey	1,080	0.8
Total votes	142,464	100.0

== General election ==
=== Results ===
2026 Louisville mayoral election
Candidate	Votes	%
Craig Greenberg (incumbent)	130,671	55.54
Shameka L. Parrish-Wright	96,272	40.92
Write-in	8,335	3.54
Total votes	235,278	100.0

== See also ==
- 2026 Kentucky elections
- 2026 Lexington, Kentucky mayoral election
- 2026 United States local elections
