= Al Gentry =

Al Gentry may refer to:

- Alwyn Gentry (1945–1993), American botanist and plant collector
- Al Gentry (politician) (born 1964), American politician and member of the Kentucky House of Representatives
