= 2018 Louisville mayoral election =

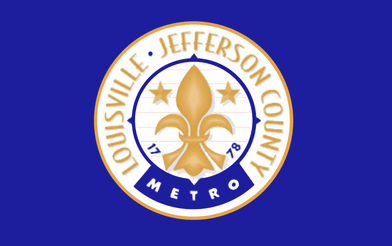
- November 6, 2018
- Turnout: 289,781
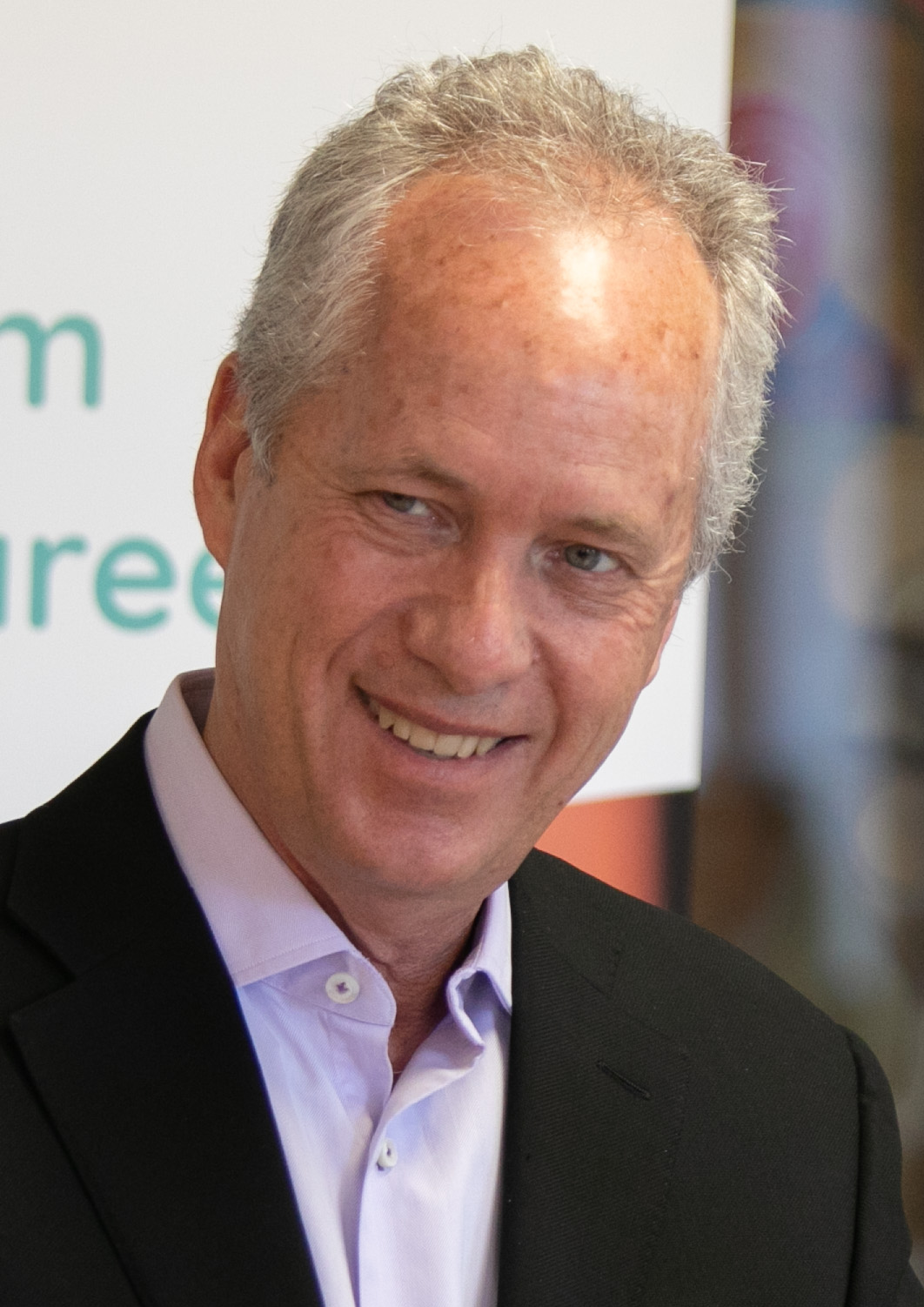

Nominee	Greg Fischer	Angela Leet
Party	Democratic	Republican
Popular vote	177,749	105,853
Percentage	61.3%	36.5%

The 2018 Louisville mayoral election was the fifth quadrennial Louisville Metro mayoral election, held on Tuesday, November 6, 2018. The Democratic candidate, incumbent mayor and businessman Greg Fischer, was elected to his third and final term. He defeated the Republican candidate, engineer and former Louisville Metro Councilwoman Angela Leet.

As the incumbent mayor, Fischer secured his party's nomination with little resistance. Despite the presence of five total candidates on the Democratic primary ballot, Fischer won the primary with a resounding 75% of the vote. The Republicans experienced a slightly more competitive primary, despite having only two candidates total. Leet clinched her party's nomination in May, defeating Bob DeVore, the Republican nominee for Mayor of Louisville in 2014.

Fischer and Leet were challenged in the general election ballot by a total of seven nonpartisan and independent candidates. Nine total candidates appeared on the 2018 general election ballot. Despite having participated in previous mayoral elections and having a presence in Louisville, the Green and Libertarian parties did not field candidates in the 2018 race.

The campaigns focused heavily on local issues, with both candidates having centered their campaigns on completely different issues. Fischer campaigned on a record he described as one of "unprecedented growth" — specifically citing over 2,700 new businesses and $13 billion in capital investment. In contrast, Leet focused heavily on crime, specifically the sharp increase in Louisville's homicide rate, over the course of Fischer's tenure. The campaign was marked by record levels of fundraising, with over $2 million being raised from both sides. The Fischer campaign raised approximately $1.6 million, which stands in stark contrast to the Leet campaign, who only managed to raise $458,400 total, with about $200,000 coming out of her own pocket for the general election.

Fischer defeated Leet, winning an overwhelming majority of the popular vote. Fischer won 61.3% of the popular vote compared to Leet's 36.5%. Despite receiving approximately 5,000 more votes than in the 2014 Louisville mayoral election, Fischer's overall percentage of votes received was lower than in 2014, where he received 68.5% of the vote. Fischer became the second mayor in Louisville's history to win a third term, and the first mayor to do so under the consolidated city–county government. He would be unable to run again in 2022 due to term limits set by the Kentucky General Assembly in 1986. Fischer was sworn in for his final term on January 8, 2019.

== Nominations ==
On May 22, 2018, the Democratic and Republican parties held their respective closed primary elections. Approximately 95,000 votes were cast in both party primaries, though turnout for the Democratic primary was more than triple the Republican primary. More than three-fourths of votes were cast in the Democratic primary. Approximately 15.8% of Jefferson County's registered voters participated in 2018's mayoral primaries, which is slightly lower than the national turnout average of 19.6%.

=== Democratic Party ===
==== Primary ====
On March 24, 2017, during a speech to local nonprofit groups, incumbent mayor Greg Fischer became the first candidate to formally announce his campaign when he stated that he would seek a third term as Louisville's mayor. Fisher remained uncontested for the nomination until October 12, 2017, when Louisville Attorney Ryan Fenwick announced he was running to challenge Fischer in the 2018 Democratic Primary. A member of Kentuckians for the Commonwealth, the 30-year-old Fenwick declared himself to be the most progressive candidate in the race. Over the course of the primary, Fenwick ran an unapologetically left-wing campaign, prioritizing issues such as a $15 minimum wage, and criticizing the use of tax dollars for corporate developments. According to Fenwick, his campaign was inspired by the successful primarying of Jackson, Mississippi mayor Tony Yarber by progressive attorney Chokwe Antar Lumumba.

With an incumbent mayor running for re-election against mostly token opposition, the race for the Democratic nomination was largely uneventful. The nomination process consisted solely of the 2018 Democratic mayoral primary, held on May 22, 2018. For the majority of the race, Fischer did not acknowledge his primary opponents in any of his public comments. His only interaction with any other primary candidate was a single debate with candidate Ryan Fenwick, which took place on Monday, April 30, 2018. Despite the presence of five total candidates, Fischer easily won his party's primary with over 75% of the vote.

Democratic primary results
Party	Candidate	Votes	%
Democratic	Greg Fischer (incumbent)	54,554	75%
Democratic	Ryan Fenwick	12,052	17%
Democratic	Lawrence Williams Jr.	2,466	3%
Democratic	Daniel Gilette	1,999	3%
Democratic	Dave Biggers	1,933	3%
Total votes		73,004	100.00%

=== Republican Party ===
==== Primary ====
Republican primary results
Party	Candidate	Votes	%
Republican	Angela Leet	16,273	66.1%
Republican	Bob DeVore	8,357	33.9%
Total votes		24,630	100%

== Campaign ==
=== Endorsements ===
Greg Fischer

Organizations

- Better Schools Kentucky
- International Brotherhood of Electrical Workers, Local 369

Newspapers

- Louisville Eccentric Observer

Politicians

- Bill Hollander, member of the Louisville Metro Council representing the 9th district
- John Yarmuth, congressman for Kentucky's 3rd congressional district
Angela Leet

Organizations

- River City Fraternal Order of Police Lodge 614

== Results ==
Louisville mayoral election, 2018
Party	Candidate	Votes	%	±%
Democratic	Greg Fischer (incumbent)	172,810	61.3%	−7.2%
Republican	Angela Leet	105,853	36.5%	+5.2%
Independent	Jackie Green	1,979	0.7%	
Independent	Chris Thieneman	1,296	0.4%	
Independent	Sean Vandevader	995	0.3%	
Independent	Billy Ralls	873	0.3%	
Independent	Henry Owens	415	0.1%	
Independent	Douglas Lattimore	315	0.1%	
Independent	Isaac Thacker IV	306	0.1%	
Majority		66,957	23%	−14%
Turnout		289,781	100%	+13%
Democratic hold		Swing		

Greg Fischer, the incumbent Democratic mayor of Louisville, defeated Republican nominee and former member of the Louisville Metro Council Angela Leet, tallying 61.3% of the vote to Leet's 36.5%, with the remainder of the vote going to various Independent candidates, most notably former professional football player Chris Thieneman, who received 0.4% of the vote.
