= Larry Clark (Kentucky politician) =

American politician

Speaker pro tempore of the Kentucky House of Representatives
- In office January 6, 1993 – January 6, 2015
- Preceded by: Pete Worthington
- Succeeded by: Jody Richards

Member of the Kentucky House of Representatives from the 46th district
- In office January 26, 1984 – January 1, 2017
- Preceded by: Harold Haering
- Succeeded by: Al Gentry

Personal details
- Born: July 24, 1945 (age 80) Louisville, Kentucky
- Party: Democratic
- Spouse: Violet
- Occupation: Electrician

Lawrence D. Clark (born July 24, 1945) is an American politician who was a Democratic member of the Kentucky House of Representatives, representing the 46th District from 1984 to 2017. He is a former Speaker Pro Tempore of the House. Clark was first elected to the house in a January 1984 special election following the resignation of incumbent representative Harold Haering. He did not seek reelection in 2016.

== Early life and education ==
Clark attended Flaget High School. He worked as an electrical apprentice from 1966 to 1970.

== Career ==
Clark was a representative of the Kentucky House since 1984, and Speaker Pro Tempore since 1993. As of 2023 he is no longer a member of the Kentucky House of Representatives.

=== Committees ===
Clark has been a member for the following committees:

- Committee On Committees, Member
- Elections, Constitutional Amendments and Intergovernmental Affairs, Member
- Interim Joint Committee on Economic Development and Tourism, Member
- Interim Joint Committee on Licensing and Occupations, Member
- Interim Joint Committee on State Government, Member
- Interim Joint Committee on Veterans, Military Affairs, and Public Protection, Member
- Legislative Research Commission, Member
- Licensing and Occupations, Member
- Rules, Member
- Task Force on Elections, Constitutional Amendments, and Intergovernmental Affairs, Member
- Tourism Development and Energy, Member
- Veterans, Military Affairs, and Public Safety, Member
- Member, Governor's Task Force on Postsecondary Education, 1996
- Member, Governor's Tax Policy Commission, 1995
- Member, Democratic Executive Finance Committee
- Member, Economic Advisory Council, Office of the Mayor of Louisville
- Member, Fine Arts Center Commission, Louisville/Jefferson County Cultural Complex Task Force
- Co-Chair, Governor's Task Force on Unemployment Insurance
- Member, Jefferson County Executive Finance Committee
- Member, Kentucky Solar Energy Task Force
- Member, Legislative Task Force on the Extension of Water Service, Jefferson County Fire Protection Study Commission
