= Craig Greenberg =

American businessman and politician

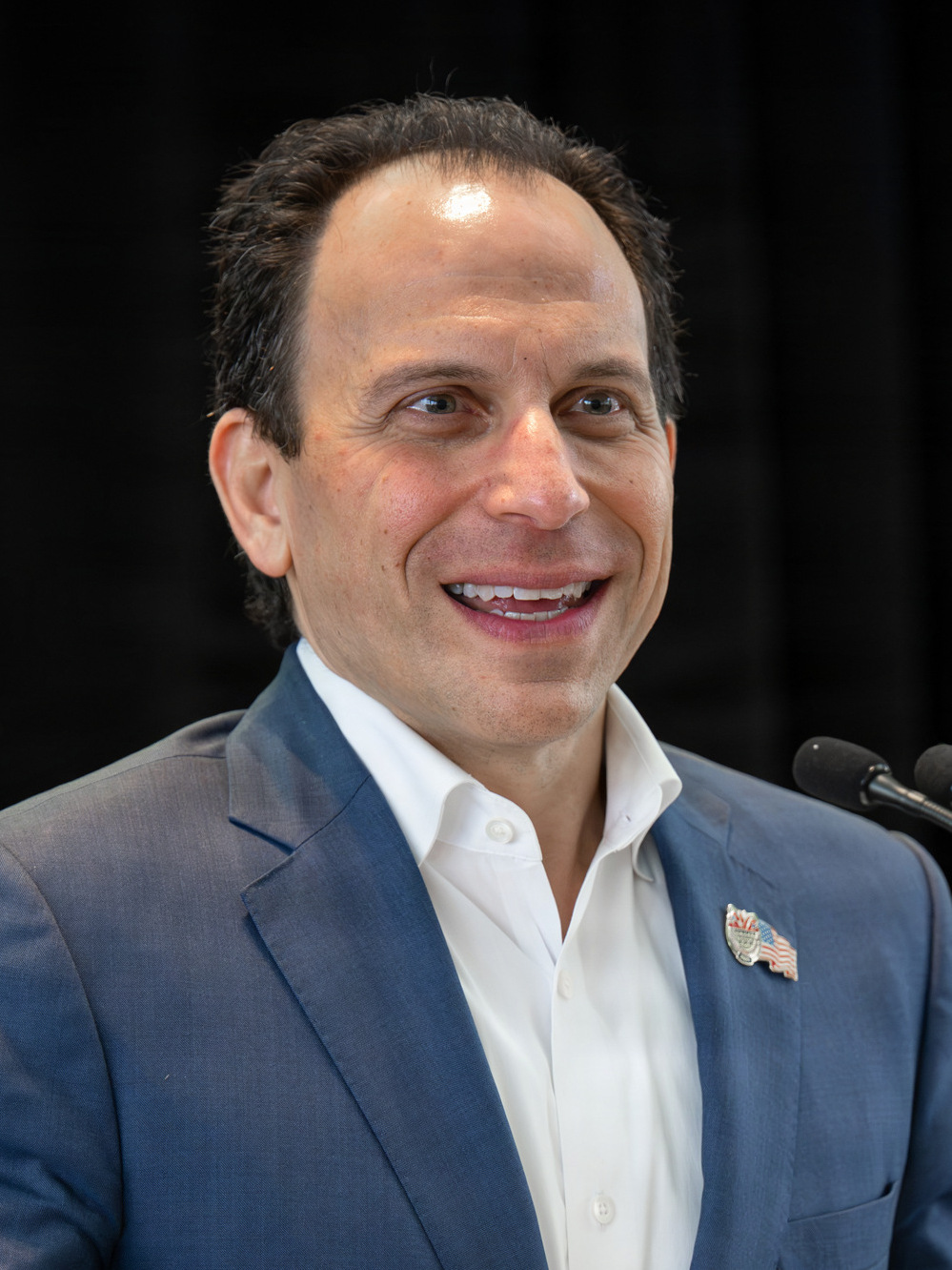
- Greenberg in 2025

Mayor of Louisville
- Incumbent
- Assumed office January 2, 2023
- Preceded by: Greg Fischer

Personal details
- Born: August 22, 1973 (age 53) Commack, New York, U.S.
- Party: Democratic
- Spouse: Rachel Greenberg
- Children: 2
- Education: University of Michigan (BS) Harvard University (JD)
- Website: Campaign website

Craig Greenberg (born August 22, 1973) is an American businessman, lawyer, and politician serving since 2023 as the third mayor of the consolidated city-county of Louisville, Kentucky. During his mayoral campaign, he was the target of an assassination attempt at his campaign headquarters, but emerged unscathed.

After graduating from Harvard Law School, Greenberg was a lawyer at Frost Brown Todd in Louisville. In 2006, he co-founded 21c Museum Hotels, of which he was chief executive officer and president. In January 2021, Greenberg and Matt Jones, a sports radio host, purchased Ohio Valley Wrestling.

== Early life and career ==
Greenberg was born in Commack, New York. His family moved to Louisville, Kentucky, in 1980. He graduated from Ballard High School. He earned his Bachelor of Science from the University of Michigan in 1995, where he was president of the student government, and his Juris Doctor from Harvard Law School in 1998.

Greenberg began his law career at Frost Brown Todd in Louisville. As an attorney with the firm, he worked on its ancillary business initiatives.

In 2006, Greenberg met art collectors and investors Steve Wilson and Laura Lee Brown, and with them co-founded the 21c Museum Hotels chain. He was named the company's president in 2012 and chief executive officer in 2017. He stepped down from 21c Museum Hotels in June 2020.

In January 2021, Greenberg and Matt Jones, a sports radio host, purchased a majority stake in Ohio Valley Wrestling. Greenberg was also involved in the development of Louisville Museum Plaza and Whiskey Row, and was a trustee for the University of Louisville.

== Mayor of Louisville ==
=== Campaign ===
In April 2021, Greenberg announced his candidacy for mayor of Louisville in the 2022 election, seeking to succeed Greg Fischer, who could not run for reelection due to term limits. He ran on a platform of public safety, affordable housing, universal pre-K, cracking down on illegal guns, supporting abortion rights, and cleaning up the city.

=== Attempted assassination ===
On February 14, 2022, Quintez Brown, a 21-year-old social justice activist and prominent voice in the Black Lives Matter community who was running as an independent for the Louisville Metro Council, walked into Greenberg's campaign headquarters office near downtown Louisville and fired several shots from a 9 mm Glock semi-automatic pistol at Greenberg from the doorway. A bullet passed through Greenberg's shirt and sweater but did not injure him. Brown then fled, as a member of the office staff was able to slam its door closed and the rest of staff barricaded the door with tables and desks. Brown was soon arrested less than half a mile away, carrying a 9 mm handgun and loaded 9 mm magazines, and was charged with several crimes, including attempted murder. Louisville Metro Council President David James called the incident an "attempted assassination". Senate Minority Leader Mitch McConnell characterized the shooting as "what appears to be an assassination attempt against a Jewish mayoral candidate".

The next day, Black Lives Matter Louisville, a chapter of the Black Lives Matter Global Network Foundation, and the Louisville Community Bail Fund jointly posted bail of $100,000 for Brown. Greenberg said he was "traumatized" by Brown's release, adding, "it is nearly impossible to believe that someone can attempt murder on Monday and walk out of jail on Wednesday." Democratic U.S. Senate candidate Charles Booker and incumbent Republican U.S. Senator Mitch McConnell expressed disapproval of Brown's release. McConnell called it "jaw-dropping" and Booker agreed that Brown should have remained incarcerated.

Brown was later rearrested on new federal charges, held as a federal prisoner at the Grayson County Detention Center in Leitchfield, Kentucky, and ordered to remain in custody ahead of trial. In March 2022, a grand jury indicted him on state charges of one count of attempted murder and four counts of first-degree wanton endangerment. In March 2023, lawyers for Brown announced they would pursue the insanity defense. Brown pleaded guilty to all federal charges in July 2024, and was sentenced to seventeen and a half years in prison in January 2025. In July 2025, Brown pleaded guilty in state court to attempted murder and four counts of wanton endangerment, which resulted in an additional 10 years in prison.

=== 2022 election ===
Greenberg won the Democratic primary election in a field of eight candidates in May, finishing 20 percentage points ahead of the second-place finisher. In the November 8 general election, he defeated the Republican nominee, Bill Dieruf, by five percentage points, becoming mayor of Louisville.

=== Reelection campaign ===
Greenberg announced his candidacy for reelection at an October 2025 rally, at which he emphasized public safety, economic development, education, and affordable housing as priorities. He was endorsed by Kentucky Governor Andy Beshear and other state and local Democrats. The 2026 Louisville mayoral election will be nonpartisan following a 2024 change in state law, meaning no political party designations will appear on the ballot.

Greenberg finished first in the May 2026 primary election with more than 52% of the vote, according to unofficial election-night results. He faces runner-up Shameka Parrish-Wright, a progressive member of the Louisville Metro Council, in the November general election.

== Personal life ==
Greenberg met his wife, Rachel, in Boston. She works as a public school teacher and they have two children. Greenberg is Jewish.

== See also ==
- List of people who survived assassination attempts

Political offices
Preceded by Greg Fischer	Mayor of Louisville; 2023–present	Incumbent
