= 2026 Kentucky elections =

A general election was held in the U.S. state of Kentucky on November 3, 2026. The primary election for all offices was held on May 19, 2026. The last day to register to vote in the primary election was April 20; the last day to register to vote in the general election was October 5.

== Federal offices ==
=== United States Senate ===
Republican congressman Andy Barr defeated Democratic candidate Charles Booker following the retirement of incumbent Republican senator Mitch McConnell.

=== United States House of Representatives ===
Kentucky has six congressional districts, electing four Republicans and two Democrats.

== State offices ==
=== Kentucky Senate ===
The Kentucky Senate consists of 38 members. In 2026, half of the chamber (all even-numbered districts) was up for election. Republicans maintained their majority, losing two seats.

=== Kentucky House of Representatives ===
All 100 seats in the Kentucky House of Representatives were up for election in 2026. Republicans maintained their majority, losing six seats.

=== Kentucky Supreme Court ===
2026 Kentucky Supreme Court 3rd district election
- November 3, 2026
- District 3
Candidate	Debra H. Lambert
Popular vote	97,761
Percentage	100.0%
Justice before election
Debra H. Lambert
Elected Justice
Debra H. Lambert

The Kentucky Supreme Court consists of 7 justices elected in non-partisan elections to staggered eight-year terms. District 3, held by incumbent justice Debra H. Lambert, was the only district up for election in 2026.

==== Results ====
2026 Kentucky Supreme Court 3rd district election
Candidate	Votes	%
Debra H. Lambert (incumbent)	Unopposed	
Total votes	97,761	100.0

=== Kentucky Court of Appeals ===
Current districts of the Supreme Court and Court of Appeals.

Two special elections were held for seats on the Kentucky Court of Appeals caused by the election of 5th district judge Pamela R. Goodwine to the supreme court in 2024, and the resignation of 3rd district judge James Lambert in 2026.

==== District 3 ====
2026 Kentucky Court of Appeals 3rd district, 2nd division special election
Candidate	Votes	%
Greg Lay	Unopposed	
Total votes	94,819	100.0

==== District 5 ====
2026 Kentucky Court of Appeals 5th district, 1st division special election
Candidate	Votes	%
Lucy Ferguson VanMeter	108,065	58.58
Will Moynahan (incumbent)	76,414	41.42
Total votes	184,479	100.0

=== Other judicial elections ===
All judges of the Kentucky District Courts were elected in non-partisan elections to four-year terms.

== Local offices ==
=== County officers ===
All county officials were elected in partisan elections to four-year terms. The offices include the County Judge/Executive, the Fiscal Court (Magistrates and/or Commissioners), County Clerk, County Attorney, Jailer, Coroner, Surveyor, Property Value Administrator, Constables, and Sheriff.

=== Mayors ===
Mayors in Kentucky are elected to four-year terms, with cities holding their elections in either presidential or midterm years. Cities with elections in 2026 include those in Louisville and in Lexington.

=== City councils ===
Each incorporated city elected its council members to a two-year term.

=== School boards ===
Local school board members are elected to staggered four-year terms, with half up for election in 2026.

=== Louisville Metro Council ===
The Louisville Metro Council is elected to staggered four-year terms, with odd-numbered districts up for election in 2026.

== Ballot measures ==
One constitutional amendment was proposed by the Kentucky General Assembly to be voted on in the general election.

=== Gubernatorial pardons amendment ===
The amendment will prohibit the governor of Kentucky from granting pardons from 60 days before a gubernatorial election until the start of the next gubernatorial term. It was approved with 71 percent of the vote.

== See also ==
- Elections in Kentucky
- Politics of Kentucky
- Political party strength in Kentucky
