= Harold Haering =

American politician

Member of the Kentucky Senate from the 19th district
- In office January 1, 1984 – January 1, 1989
- Preceded by: Bill McGee
- Succeeded by: Tim Shaughnessy

Member of the Kentucky House of Representatives from the 46th district
- In office January 1, 1978 – January 1, 1984
- Preceded by: Robert F. Hughes
- Succeeded by: Larry Clark

Personal details
- Born: December 27, 1930
- Died: May 5, 2014 (aged 83)
- Party: Republican

Harold John Haering Sr. (December 27, 1930 – May 5, 2014) was an American politician from Louisville, Kentucky.

Haering received his degree in history from Xavier University. He then taught elementary school and was in the real estate and home building business. He served in the Kentucky House of Representatives and then served in the Kentucky Senate from 1983 to 1988 as a Republican.
