= Kentucky's 19th Senate district =

American legislative district

Kentucky's 19th State Senate district
Senator
Cassie Chambers Armstrong; D–Louisville
since March 2, 2023
- Registration: 59.6% Democratic; 28.3% Republican; 11.6% No party preference
- Demographics: 75.8% White; 11.5% Black; 6.8% Hispanic; 1.8% Asian; 0.3% Other; 3.7% Multiracial
- Population (2023): 110,056
- Registered voters (2025): 96,152

Kentucky's 19th Senatorial district is one of 38 districts in the Kentucky Senate. It comprises part of Jefferson County. It has been represented by Cassie Chambers Armstrong (D–Louisville) since 2023. As of 2023, the district had a population of 110,056.

== Voter registration ==
On January 1, 2025, the district had 96,152 registered voters, who were registered with the following parties.

Party	Registration	
Party	Voters	%
Democratic	57,264	59.56
Republican	27,171	28.26
Independent	5,443	5.66
Libertarian	412	0.43
Green	101	0.11
Constitution	34	0.04
Socialist Workers	33	0.03
Reform	5	0.01
"Other"	5,689	5.92
Total	96,152	100.00
Source: Kentucky State Board of Elections

== Election results from statewide races ==
=== 2022 – present ===
Year	Office	Results (Note: Figures presented in this table are calculated by summing precinct election results published by the Kentucky State Board of Elections, using precinct data that list each precinct's senatorial district.)
2022	Senator	Booker 66.7 - 33.3%
2022	Amendment 1	No 72.6 - 27.4%
2022	Amendment 2	No 76.7 - 23.3%
2023	Governor	Beshear 76.3 - 23.7%
2023	Secretary of State	Wheatley 63.9 - 36.1%
2023	Attorney General	Stevenson 68.5 - 31.5%
2023	Auditor of Public Accounts	Reeder 66.0 - 34.0%
2023	State Treasurer	Bowman 69.6 - 30.4%
2023	Commissioner of Agriculture	Enlow 68.0 - 32.0%
2024	President	Harris 64.4 - 33.6%
2024	Amendment 1	No 53.5 - 46.5%
2024	Amendment 2	No 71.3 - 28.7%

== List of members representing the district ==
Member	Party	Years	Electoral history	District location
Fred F. Bishop (Manchester)	Republican	January 1, 1968 – May 8, 1970	Elected in 1967. Died.	1964–1972
Lillie Roberts Bishop (Manchester)	Republican	November 1970 – January 1, 1972	Elected to finish her husband's term. Retired.	1964–1972
Tom Mobley (Louisville)	Democratic	January 1, 1972 – January 1, 1980	Elected in 1971. Reelected in 1975. Lost renomination.	1972–1974
Tom Mobley (Louisville)	Democratic	January 1, 1972 – January 1, 1980	Elected in 1971. Reelected in 1975. Lost renomination.	1974–1984
Bill "Fibber" McGee (Louisville)	Democratic	January 1, 1980 – January 1, 1984	Elected in 1979. Lost reelection.	1974–1984
Harold Haering (Louisville)	Republican	January 1, 1984 – January 1, 1989	Elected in 1983. Lost reelection.	1984–1993; Jefferson County (part).
Tim Shaughnessy (Louisville)	Democratic	January 1, 1989 – June 29, 2012	Elected in 1988. Reelected in 1992. Reelected in 1996. Reelected in 2000. Reelected in 2004. Reelected in 2008. Resigned.	1984–1993; Jefferson County (part).
Tim Shaughnessy (Louisville)	Democratic	January 1, 1989 – June 29, 2012	Elected in 1988. Reelected in 1992. Reelected in 1996. Reelected in 2000. Reelected in 2004. Reelected in 2008. Resigned.	1993–1997
Tim Shaughnessy (Louisville)	Democratic	January 1, 1989 – June 29, 2012	Elected in 1988. Reelected in 1992. Reelected in 1996. Reelected in 2000. Reelected in 2004. Reelected in 2008. Resigned.	1997–2003
Tim Shaughnessy (Louisville)	Democratic	January 1, 1989 – June 29, 2012	Elected in 1988. Reelected in 1992. Reelected in 1996. Reelected in 2000. Reelected in 2004. Reelected in 2008. Resigned.	2003–2015
Morgan McGarvey (Louisville)	Democratic	December 4, 2012 – January 2, 2023	Elected to finish Shaughnessy's term and also to the next term in 2012. Reelected in 2016. Reelected in 2020. Resigned after being elected to Kentucky's 3rd congressional district.	2003–2015
Morgan McGarvey (Louisville)	Democratic	December 4, 2012 – January 2, 2023	Elected to finish Shaughnessy's term and also to the next term in 2012. Reelected in 2016. Reelected in 2020. Resigned after being elected to Kentucky's 3rd congressional district.	2015–2023
Cassie; Chambers Armstrong (Louisville)	Democratic	March 2, 2023 – present	Elected to finish McGarvey's term. Reelected in 2024.	2023–present
