= Tim Shaughnessy =

Member of the Kentucky Senate

Member of the Kentucky Senate from the 19th district
- In office January 1, 1989 – June 29, 2012
- Preceded by: Harold Haering
- Succeeded by: Morgan McGarvey

Personal details
- Born: August 22, 1957 (age 69)
- Party: Democratic
- Education: University of Louisville (BA); Bellarmine College (MBA)

Timothy Thomas Shaughnessy (born August 22, 1957) is an American politician and six term Democratic member of the Kentucky Senate, where he represented the 19th district.

== Early life and education ==
Shaughnessy attended Jefferson Community College. He went on to earn his B.S. from the University of Louisville. He then received his MBA from Bellarmine College. Shaughnessy was the recipient of Kentucky Jaycees' "outstanding Young Kentuckian" award in 1978.

== Career ==
=== Early career ===
Shaughnessy began his career as legislative aid to Jefferson County Commissioner Jim Malone. In 1982, Shaughnessy was appointed as a member to the newly created charter commission to study a possible local government reorganization. In 1983, the commission voted 17–4 in favor of a city-county merger for Louisville and Jefferson County. Shaughnessy ran as a Democrat for the 30th district of the Kentucky State Legislature, in which he ultimately was defeated by the incumbent and Jefferson Democratic Party Chairman, Tom Burch.

=== Kentucky Senate ===
In 1988, Shaughnessy successfully ran against incumbent Kentucky State Senator Harold Haering. After 6 successful elections to the Kentucky Senate, Shaughnessy's political career would come to in end in 2012 when he resigned prior to the end of his term without explanation.

== Electoral history ==
Kentucky State Representative, District 30 Democratic Primary Election, 1981
Party	Candidate	Votes	%
Democratic	Thomas J Burch (incumbent)	1,280	57.71
Democratic	Tim Shaughnessy	938	42.29
Total votes		2,218	100.0

Kentucky State Senate, District 19 General Election, 1988
Party	Candidate	Votes	%
Republican	Harold Haering (incumbent)	20,139	49.02
Democratic	Tim Shaughnessy	20,938	50.98
Total votes		41,077	100.0
Democratic gain from Republican			

Kentucky State Senate, District 19 General Election, 1992
Party	Candidate	Votes	%
Democratic	Tim Shaughnessy (incumbent)	28,460	66.50
Republican	William Redmon	14,340	33.50
Total votes		42,800	100.0
Democratic hold			

Kentucky State Senate, District 19 General Election, 1996
Party	Candidate	Votes	%
Democratic	Tim Shaughnessy (incumbent)	24,198	59.27
Republican	Barbara "Bobbie" Holsclaw	16,632	40.73
Total votes		40,830	100.0
Democratic hold			

Kentucky State Senate, District 19 General Election, 2000
Party	Candidate	Votes	%
Democratic	Tim Shaughnessy (incumbent)	26,872	61.0
Republican	Paul Schmidt	16,132	36.60
Libertarian	Nick Karem	1,029	2.3
Total votes		44,033	100.0
Democratic hold			

Kentucky State Senate, District 19 Democratic Primary, 2004
Party	Candidate	Votes	%
Democratic	Tim Shaughnessy (incumbent)	9,597	79.7
Democratic	Ched Jennings	2,441	20.3
Total votes		12,038	100.0

Kentucky State Senate, District 19 General Election, 2004
Party	Candidate	Votes	%
Democratic	Tim Shaughnessy (incumbent)	36,749	61.5
Republican	Christopher M. Smrt	22,964	38.5
Total votes		59,713	100.0
Democratic hold			

Kentucky State Senate, District 19 General Election, 2008
Party	Candidate	Votes	%
Democratic	Tim Shaughnessy (incumbent)	36,199	59.5
Republican	Bob Heleringer	24,615	40.5
Total votes		60,814	100.0
Democratic hold			
