= 2026 Lexington, Kentucky mayoral election =

2026 Lexington mayoral election
- November 3, 2026
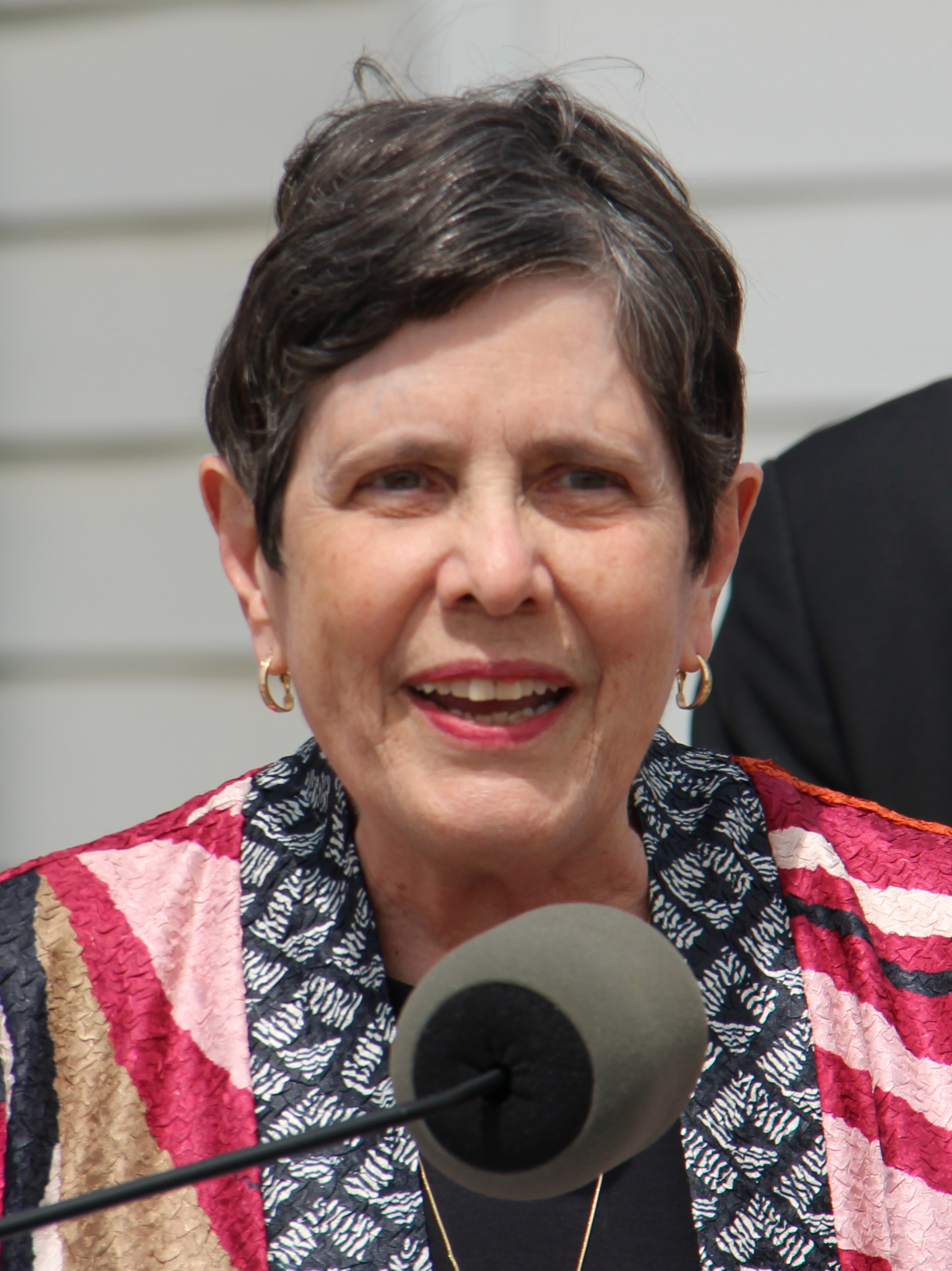

Candidate	Linda Gorton	Raquel E. Carter
Popular vote	56,203	45,869
Percentage	55.06%	44.94%
Mayor before election
Linda Gorton
Republican
Elected mayor
Linda Gorton
Republican

The 2026 Lexington, Kentucky mayoral election was held on November 3, 2026, to elect the mayor of Lexington, Kentucky. The primary election was held on May 19, with incumbent two-term mayor Linda Gorton advancing to the general election alongside real estate agent Raquel E. Carter. Gorton was elected to a third term with 55 percent of the vote.

Mayoral elections in Lexington are nonpartisan, though Gorton is a member of the Republican Party, while Carter is a Democrat.

== Candidates ==
=== Advanced to general ===
- Raquel E. Carter, real estate agent
- Linda Gorton, incumbent mayor

=== Eliminated in primary ===
- Ramazani Asmani, volunteer
- Skip Horine, perennial candidate
- C. E. Huffman, publicist
- Greg O'Neal, landscaper
- Darnell Tagaloa, candidate for the Lexington-Fayette Urban County Council in 2022 and 2024

== Primary election ==
=== Endorsements ===
Raquel E. Carter

Organizations

- EMILYs List

Newspapers

- Lexington Herald-Leader (co-endorsement with Gorton)
Linda Gorton

Organizations

- Fairness Campaign

Newspapers

- Lexington Herald-Leader (co-endorsement with Carter)

=== Results ===
Results by precinct: Gorton: 30–40%; 40–50%; 50–60%; 60–70%; Carter: 30–40%; 40–50%; 50–60%; 60–70%; Tie: Gorton-Carter 30–40%; Carter-Asmani 30–40%

Primary election results
Candidate	Votes	%
Linda Gorton (incumbent)	25,298	45.8
Raquel E. Carter	15,615	28.3
Greg O'Neal	5,073	9.2
C. E. Huffman	3,978	7.2
Darnell Tagaloa	2,095	3.8
Skip Horine	1,647	3.0
Ramazani Asmani	1,545	2.8
Total votes	55,251	100.0

== General election ==
=== Polling ===
Poll source	Date(s) administered	Sample size (Note: Key: A – all adults RV – registered voters LV – likely voters V – unclear)	Margin of error	Raquel Carter	Linda Gorton	Other	Undecided
Lake Research Partners (D) (Note: Poll sponsored by Carter's campaign)	August 13–18, 2026	400 (LV)	± 4.9%	34%	39%	6%	20%

=== Results ===
2026 Lexington, Kentucky mayoral election
Candidate	Votes	%
Linda Gorton (incumbent)	56,203	55.06
Raquel E. Carter	45,869	44.94
Total votes	102,072	100.0

== See also ==
- 2026 Kentucky elections
- 2026 Louisville mayoral election
- 2026 United States local elections

== Notes ==
Partisan clients
