= 2022 United States House of Representatives elections in Kentucky =

- November 8, 2022

All 6 Kentucky seats to the United States House of Representatives
	Majority party	Minority party
Party	Republican	Democratic
Last election	5	1
Seats won	5	1
Seat change	Steady	Steady
Popular vote	953,296	490,921
Percentage	65.14%	33.55%
Swing	▲0.68%	▼1.21%

Republican
40–50%
50–60%
60–70%
70–80%
80–90%
>90%
Democratic
60–70%

The 2022 United States House of Representatives elections in Kentucky were held on November 8, 2022, to elect the six U.S. representatives from the state of Kentucky, one from each of the state's six congressional districts. The elections coincided with other elections to the House of Representatives, elections to the United States Senate and various state and local elections.

== District 1 ==
2022 Kentucky's 1st congressional district election
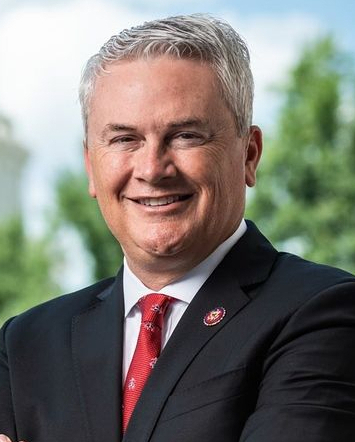

Nominee	James Comer	Jimmy Ausbrooks
Party	Republican	Democratic
Popular vote	184,157	61,701
Percentage	74.9%	25.1%
- County results Comer: 50–60% 60–70% 70–80% 80–90% >90%
U.S. Representative before election
James Comer
Republican
Elected U.S. Representative
James Comer
Republican

The 1st district takes in Western Kentucky, including Paducah, Hopkinsville, Murray, and Henderson. The incumbent was Republican James Comer, who had represented the 1st district since 2016. Comer was most recently re-elected in 2022, winning 74.9% of the vote.

=== Republican primary ===
==== Candidates ====
===== Nominee =====
- James Comer, incumbent U.S. representative

===== Withdrawn =====
- David Sharp, former chair of the Hopkins County Republican Party (running for state representative)

==== Endorsements ====
James Comer

U.S. executive branch officials

- Donald Trump, 45th president of the United States (2017–2021)

=== Democratic primary ===
==== Candidates ====
===== Nominee =====
- Jimmy Ausbrooks

=== General election ===
==== Predictions ====
Source	Ranking	As of
The Cook Political Report	Solid R	January 24, 2022
Inside Elections	Solid R	February 22, 2022
Sabato's Crystal Ball	Safe R	January 26, 2022
Politico	Solid R	April 5, 2022
RCP	Safe R	June 9, 2022
Fox News	Solid R	July 11, 2022
DDHQ	Solid R	July 20, 2022
538	Solid R	June 30, 2022
The Economist	Safe R	October 18, 2022

==== Results ====
2022 Kentucky's 1st congressional district election
Party	Candidate	Votes	%
Republican	James Comer (incumbent)	184,157	74.9
Democratic	Jimmy Ausbrooks	61,701	25.1
Total votes		245,858	100.0
Republican hold			

== District 2 ==
2022 Kentucky's 2nd congressional district election
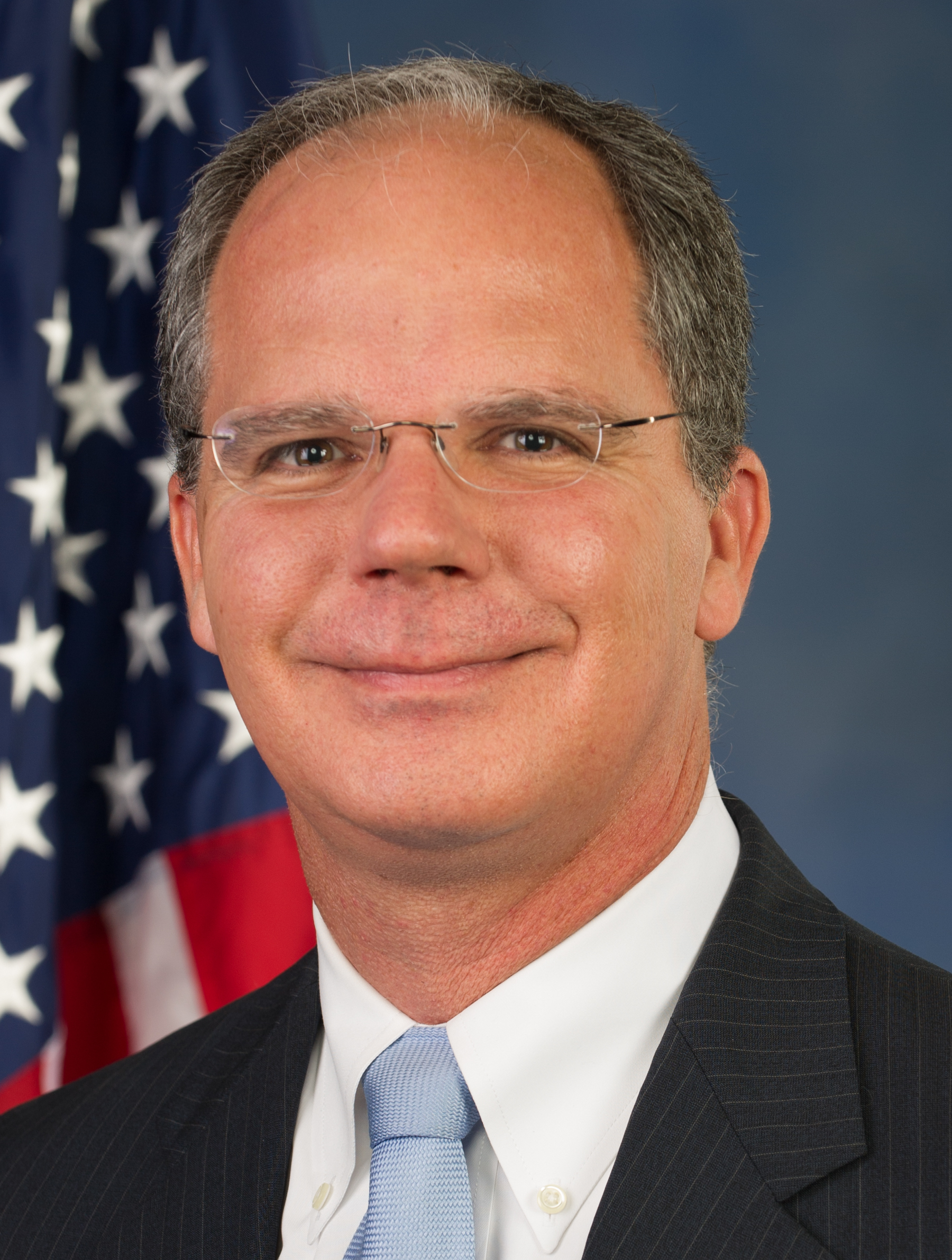

Nominee	Brett Guthrie	Hank Linderman
Party	Republican	Democratic
Popular vote	170,487	66,769
Percentage	71.9%	28.1%
- County results Guthrie: 60–70% 70–80% 80–90%
U.S. Representative before election
Brett Guthrie
Republican
Elected U.S. Representative
Brett Guthrie
Republican

The 2nd district encompasses west-central Kentucky, taking in Bowling Green, Owensboro, and Elizabethtown. The incumbent was Republican Brett Guthrie, who had represented the 2nd district since 2009. Guthrie was most recently re-elected in 2022, winning 71.9% of the vote.

=== Republican primary ===
==== Candidates ====
===== Nominee =====
- Brett Guthrie, incumbent U.S. representative

===== Eliminated in primary =====
- Brent Feher
- E. Lee Watts

==== Endorsements ====
Brett Guthrie

U.S. executive branch officials

- Donald Trump, 45th president of the United States (2017–2021)

=== Results ===
Republican primary results
Party	Candidate	Votes	%
Republican	Brett Guthrie (incumbent)	52,265	78.1
Republican	Lee Watts	11,996	17.9
Republican	Brent Feher	2,681	4.0
Total votes		66,942	100.0

=== Democratic primary ===
==== Candidates ====
===== Nominee =====
- Hank Linderman, nominee for this seat in 2018 and 2020

===== Eliminated in primary =====
- William Compton, Plum Springs city commissioner

=== Results ===
Democratic primary results
Party	Candidate	Votes	%
Democratic	Hank Linderman	20,174	58.2
Democratic	William Compton	14,465	41.8
Total votes		34,639	100.0

=== General election ===
==== Predictions ====
Source	Ranking	As of
The Cook Political Report	Solid R	January 24, 2022
Inside Elections	Solid R	February 22, 2022
Sabato's Crystal Ball	Safe R	January 26, 2022
Politico	Solid R	April 5, 2022
RCP	Safe R	June 9, 2022
Fox News	Solid R	July 11, 2022
DDHQ	Solid R	July 20, 2022
538	Solid R	June 30, 2022
The Economist	Safe R	October 18, 2022

==== Results ====
2022 Kentucky's 2nd congressional district election
Party	Candidate	Votes	%
Republican	Brett Guthrie (incumbent)	170,487	71.9
Democratic	Hank Linderman	66,769	28.1
Total votes		237,256	100.0
Republican hold			

== District 3 ==
2022 Kentucky's 3rd congressional district election
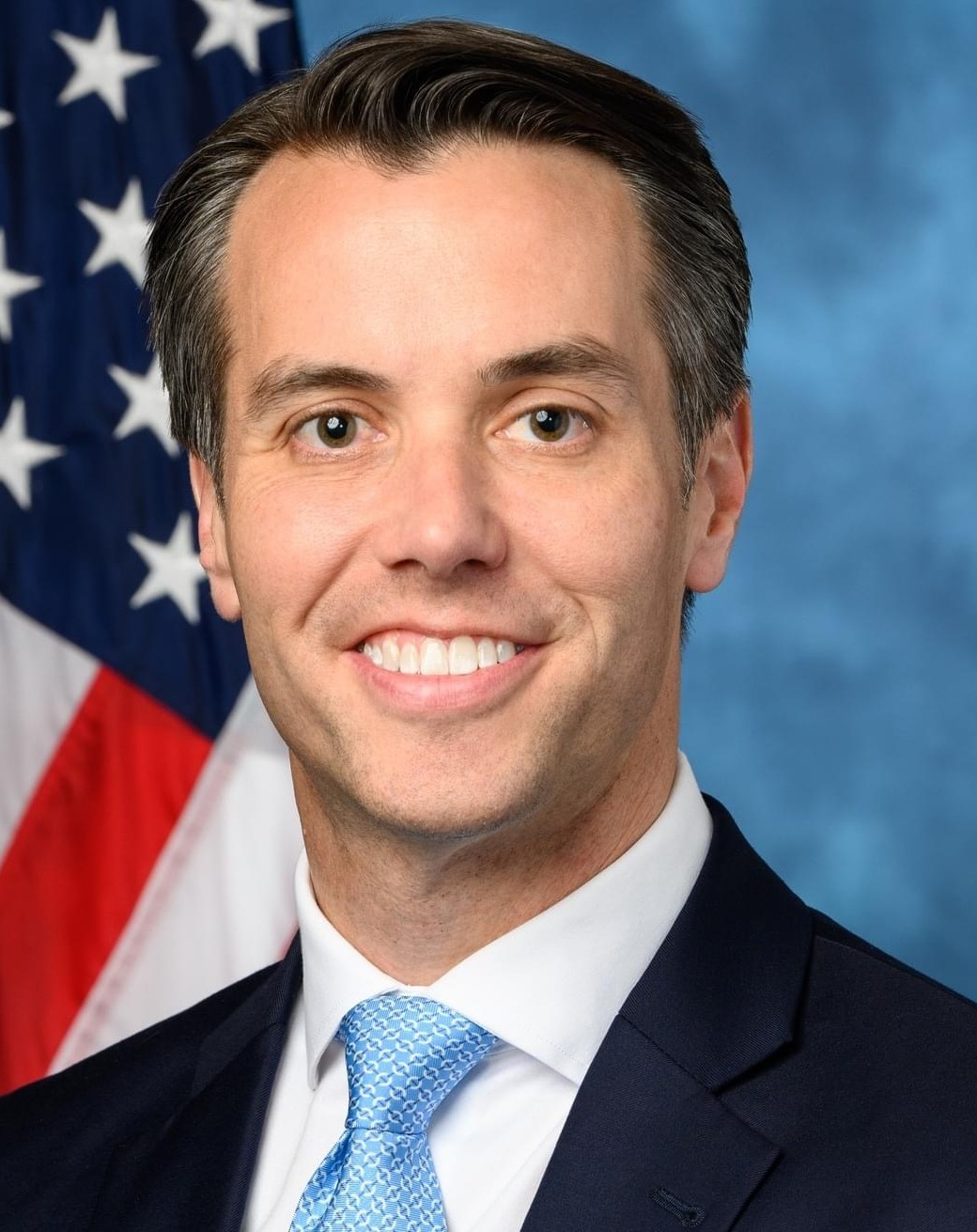

Nominee	Morgan McGarvey	Stuart Ray
Party	Democratic	Republican
Popular vote	160,920	98,637
Percentage	62.0%	38.0%
- County result McGarvey: 60–70%
U.S. Representative before election
John Yarmuth
Democratic
Elected U.S. Representative
Morgan McGarvey
Democratic

The 3rd district encompasses nearly all of Louisville Metro, which, since the merger of 2003, is consolidated with Jefferson County, though other incorporated cities, such as Shively and St. Matthews, exist within the county. Incumbent representative John Yarmuth announced he would not be running for re-election in 2022. He was succeeded in 2022 by State Senator Morgan McGarvey, who won 62.0% of the vote in the general election.

=== Democratic primary ===
==== Candidates ====
===== Nominee =====
- Morgan McGarvey, minority leader of the Kentucky Senate

===== Eliminated in primary =====
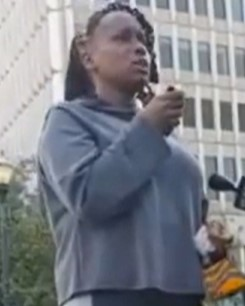
State Representative Attica Scott from Louisville

- Attica Scott, state representative

===== Declined =====
- Matthew Barzun, former U.S. ambassador to the United Kingdom
- Charles Booker, former state representative and candidate for U.S. Senate in 2020 (running for U.S. Senate)
- Greg Fischer, Mayor of Louisville
- Gill Holland, businessman
- Aaron Yarmuth, former newspaper owner and son of U.S. Representative John Yarmuth
- John Yarmuth, incumbent U.S. representative

==== Endorsements ====
Morgan McGarvey

U.S. representatives

- John Yarmuth, U.S. representative for Kentucky's 3rd congressional district (2007–present)

Organizations

- Kentucky AFL–CIO
- League of Conservation Voters Action Fund
- Pro-Israel America
Attica Scott

Organizations

- Future Generations
- Higher Heights for America PAC
- National Women's Political Caucus
- Progressive Change Campaign Committee
- Showing Up for Racial Justice (SURJ)

==== Debates and forums ====
2022 KY-03 Democratic primary debates and forums
No.	Date	Host	Moderator	Link	Participants	
P Participant A Absent N Non-invitee I Invitee W Withdrawn						
P Participant A Absent N Non-invitee I Invitee W Withdrawn					McGarvey	Scott
1	May 11, 2022	The Louisville Forum	Joe Arnold		P	P

==== Results ====
Democratic primary results
Party	Candidate	Votes	%
Democratic	Morgan McGarvey	52,157	63.3
Democratic	Attica Scott	30,183	36.7
Total votes		82,340	100.0

=== Republican primary ===
==== Candidates ====
===== Nominee =====
- Stuart Ray

===== Eliminated in primary =====
- Daniel Cobble
- Mike Craven
- Justin Gregory
- Darien Moreno, tax preparer
- Rhonda Palazzo
- Gregory Puccetti

===== Disqualified =====
- Bob DeVore, former McCreary County Board of Education member (2001–2007) and perennial candidate (Note: Candidate for Kentucky's 16th Senate district in 2006; candidate for Kentucky's 3rd congressional district in 2008, 2012, and 2016; candidate for Kentucky's 46th House district in 2010 and nominee in 2020; Republican nominee for Mayor of Louisville in 2014 and candidate in 2018)

===== Declined =====
- Julie Raque Adams, state senator
- Michael Adams, secretary of state of Kentucky

==== Results ====
Republican primary results
Party	Candidate	Votes	%
Republican	Stuart Ray	9,703	29.5
Republican	Rhonda Palazzo	9,645	29.4
Republican	Mike Craven	6,488	19.7
Republican	Gregory Puccetti	2,980	9.1
Republican	Daniel Cobble	1,539	4.7
Republican	Justin Gregory	1,293	3.9
Republican	Darien Moreno	1,212	3.7
Total votes		32,860	100.0

=== General election ===
==== Predictions ====
Source	Ranking	As of
The Cook Political Report	Solid D	January 24, 2022
Inside Elections	Solid D	February 22, 2022
Sabato's Crystal Ball	Safe D	January 26, 2022
Politico	Solid D	April 5, 2022
RCP	Safe D	June 9, 2022
Fox News	Solid D	August 22, 2022
DDHQ	Likely D	October 18, 2022
538	Solid D	June 30, 2022
The Economist	Safe D	October 18, 2022

==== Post-primary endorsements ====
Morgan McGarvey (D)

Statewide officials

- Andy Beshear, 63rd governor of Kentucky (2019–present)

Organizations

- Giffords
- Sierra Club

==== Results ====
2022 Kentucky's 3rd congressional district election
Party	Candidate	Votes	%
Democratic	Morgan McGarvey	160,920	62.0
Republican	Stuart Ray	98,637	38.0
	Daniel Cobble (write-in)	30	0.0
Total votes		259,587	100.0
Democratic hold			

== District 4 ==
2022 Kentucky's 4th congressional district election
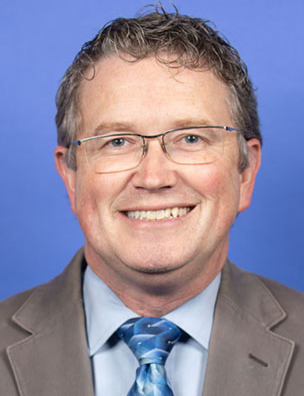

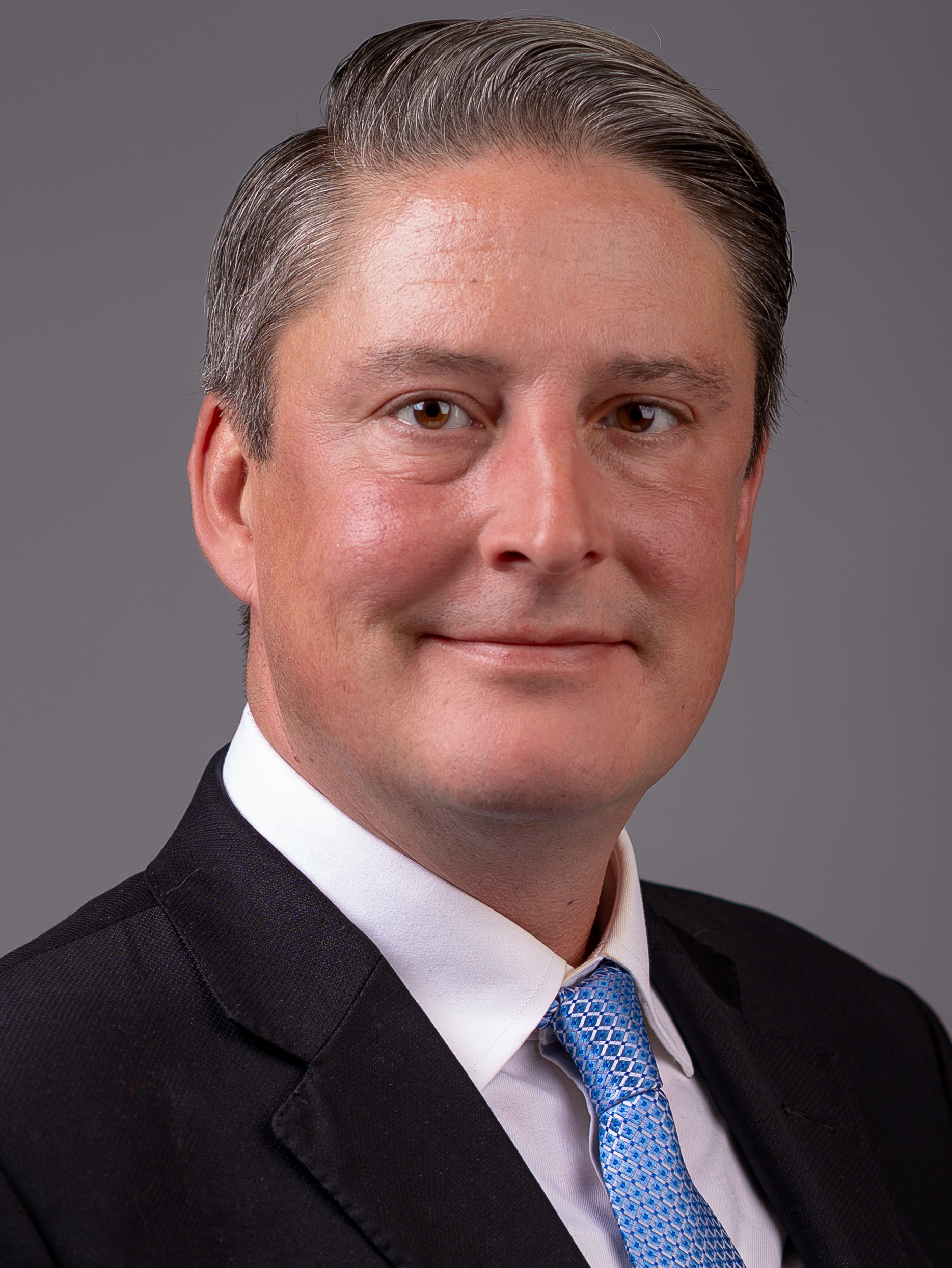
Nominee	Thomas Massie	Matthew Lehman
Party	Republican	Democratic
Popular vote	167,541	79,977
Percentage	65.0%	31.0%
- County results Massie: 50–60% 60–70% 70–80% 80–90%
U.S. Representative before election
Thomas Massie
Republican
Elected U.S. Representative
Thomas Massie
Republican

The 4th district is located in the northeastern part of the state along the Ohio River, including the suburbs of Cincinnati and a small part of Louisville. The incumbent was Republican Thomas Massie, who had represented the district since 2012. Massie was most recently re-elected in 2022, winning 65.0% of the vote in the general election.

=== Republican primary ===
==== Candidates ====
===== Nominee =====
- Thomas Massie, incumbent U.S. representative

===== Eliminated in primary =====
- Alyssa Dara McDowell
- George Washington
- Claire Wirth, real estate developer

==== Endorsements ====
Thomas Massie

U.S. executive branch officials

- Donald Trump, president of the United States (2017–2021, 2025–present)

Organizations

- FreedomWorks

==== Polling ====
Poll source	Date(s) administered	Sample size (Note: Key: A – all adults RV – registered voters LV – likely voters V – unclear)	Margin of error	Thomas Massie	Alyssa Dara McDowell	George Washington	Claire Wirth	Undecided
Public Opinion Strategies (R) (Note: This poll was sponsored by Massie's campaign.)	April 28 – May 1, 2022	300 (LV)	± 5.7%	66%	2%	4%	9%	19%

==== Results ====
Republican primary results
Party	Candidate	Votes	%
Republican	Thomas Massie (incumbent)	50,301	75.2
Republican	Claire Wirth	10,521	15.7
Republican	Alyssa Dara McDowell	3,446	5.2
Republican	George Washington	2,606	3.9
Total votes		66,874	100.0

=== Democratic primary ===
==== Candidates ====
===== Nominee =====
- Matthew Lehman

==== Endorsements ====
Matthew Lehman

Statewide officials

- Andy Beshear, governor of Kentucky

Organizations

- Sierra Club

=== General election ===
==== Predictions ====
Source	Ranking	As of
The Cook Political Report	Solid R	January 24, 2022
Inside Elections	Solid R	February 22, 2022
Sabato's Crystal Ball	Safe R	January 26, 2022
Politico	Solid R	April 5, 2022
RCP	Safe R	June 9, 2022
Fox News	Solid R	July 11, 2022
DDHQ	Solid R	July 20, 2022
538	Solid R	June 30, 2022
The Economist	Safe R	October 18, 2022

==== Results ====
2022 Kentucky's 4th congressional district election
Party	Candidate	Votes	%
Republican	Thomas Massie (incumbent)	167,541	65.0
Democratic	Matthew Lehman	79,977	31.0
Pirate	Ethan Osborne (Note: Appeared on the ballot as an independent.)	10,111	3.9
Total votes		257,629	100.0
Republican hold			

== District 5 ==
2022 Kentucky's 5th congressional district election
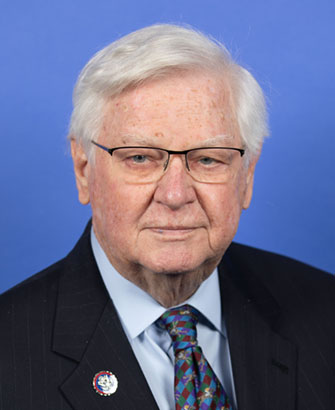

Nominee	Hal Rogers	Conor Halbleib
Party	Republican	Democratic
Popular vote	177,712	38,549
Percentage	82.2%	17.8%
- County results Rogers: 60–70% 70–80% 80–90% >90%
U.S. Representative before election
Hal Rogers
Republican
Elected U.S. Representative
Hal Rogers
Republican

The 5th district is based in the coalfields of eastern Kentucky. The incumbent was Republican Hal Rogers, who had represented the 5th district since 1981. He was most recently re-elected in 2022, with 82.2% of the vote.

=== Republican primary ===
==== Candidates ====
===== Nominee =====
- Hal Rogers, incumbent U.S. representative and dean of the House

===== Eliminated in primary =====
- Jeannette Andrews, accountant
- Brandon Monhollen, transportation manager
- Gerardo Serrano, farmer and activist
- Richard Van Dam, physician

==== Endorsements ====
Hal Rogers

U.S. executive branch officials

- Donald Trump, 45th president of the United States (2017–2021)

==== Primary results ====
Republican primary results
Party	Candidate	Votes	%
Republican	Hal Rogers (incumbent)	77,050	82.6
Republican	Gerardo Serrano	5,460	5.8
Republican	Jeannette Andrews	4,160	4.5
Republican	Brandon Monhollen	3,831	4.1
Republican	Richard Van Dam	2,784	3.0
Total votes		93,285	100.0

=== Democratic primary ===
==== Candidates ====
===== Nominee =====
- Conor Halbleib

=== General election ===
Conor Halblieb

Organizations

- LegalizeKY

==== Predictions ====
Source	Ranking	As of
The Cook Political Report	Solid R	January 24, 2022
Inside Elections	Solid R	February 22, 2022
Sabato's Crystal Ball	Safe R	January 26, 2022
Politico	Solid R	April 5, 2022
RCP	Safe R	June 9, 2022
Fox News	Solid R	July 11, 2022
DDHQ	Solid R	July 20, 2022
538	Solid R	June 30, 2022
The Economist	Safe R	October 18, 2022

==== Results ====
2022 Kentucky's 5th congressional district election
Party	Candidate	Votes	%
Republican	Hal Rogers (incumbent)	177,712	82.2
Democratic	Conor Halbleib	38,549	17.8
	Stephan William (write-in)	9	0.0
Total votes		216,270	100.0
Republican hold			

== District 6 ==
2022 Kentucky's 6th congressional district election
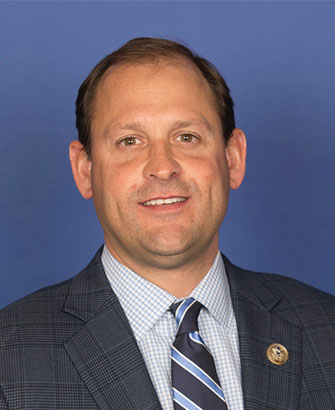

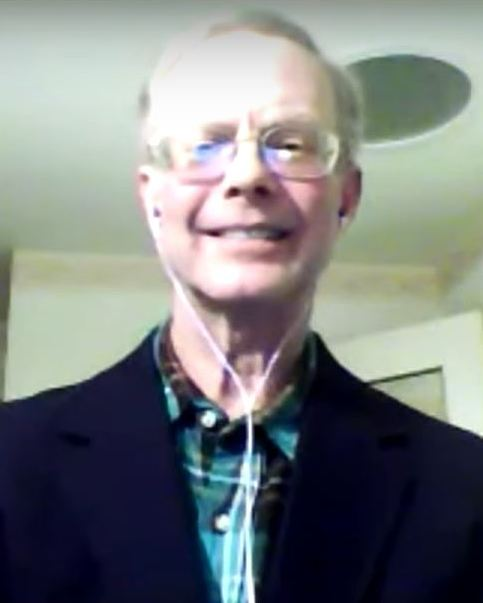
Nominee	Andy Barr	Geoff Young
Party	Republican	Democratic
Popular vote	154,762	83,005
Percentage	62.7%	33.6%
- County results Barr: 40–50% 60–70% 70–80% 80–90%
U.S. Representative before election
Andy Barr
Republican
Elected U.S. Representative
Andy Barr
Republican

The 6th district is located in central Kentucky, taking in Lexington, Richmond, and Frankfort. The incumbent was Republican Andy Barr, who had represented the 6th district since 2013. Barr was most recently re-elected in 2020, winning 57.3% of the vote in the general election.

=== Republican primary ===
==== Candidates ====
===== Nominee =====
- Andy Barr, incumbent U.S. representative

===== Eliminated in primary =====
- Derek Petteys, project manager and candidate for U.S. Senate in 2020

==== Endorsements ====
Andy Barr

U.S. executive branch officials

- Donald Trump, 45th president of the United States (2017–2021)

Organizations

- Pro-Israel America

==== Results ====
Republican primary results
Party	Candidate	Votes	%
Republican	Andy Barr (incumbent)	47,660	87.8
Republican	Derek Petteys	6,593	12.2
Total votes		54,253	100.0

=== Democratic primary ===
==== Candidates ====
===== Nominee =====
- Geoff Young, perennial candidate and assistant director

===== Eliminated in primary =====
- Christopher Preece, educator

==== Endorsements ====
Christopher Preece

Individuals

- Marianne Williamson, author and candidate for president of the United States in 2020

==== Results ====
County results Map legend: Young—60–70%; Young—50–60%; Preece—50–60%

Democratic primary results
Party	Candidate	Votes	%
Democratic	Geoff Young	25,722	51.7
Democratic	Christopher Preece	24,007	48.3
Total votes		49,729	100.0

=== General election ===
==== Predictions ====
Source	Ranking	As of
The Cook Political Report	Solid R	January 24, 2022
Inside Elections	Solid R	February 22, 2022
Sabato's Crystal Ball	Safe R	January 26, 2022
Politico	Solid R	May 23, 2022
RCP	Safe R	June 9, 2022
Fox News	Solid R	July 11, 2022
DDHQ	Solid R	July 20, 2022
538	Solid R	June 30, 2022
The Economist	Safe R	October 18, 2022

==== Results ====
2022 Kentucky's 6th congressional district election
Party	Candidate	Votes	%
Republican	Andy Barr (incumbent)	154,762	62.7
Democratic	Geoff Young	83,005	33.6
	Maurice Randall Cravens II (write-in)	8,970	3.6
	Maxwell Keith Froedge (write-in)	81	0.0
Total votes		246,818	100.0
Republican hold			

== Notes ==
Partisan clients
