= Greg Fischer =

Mayor of Louisville, Kentucky, United States

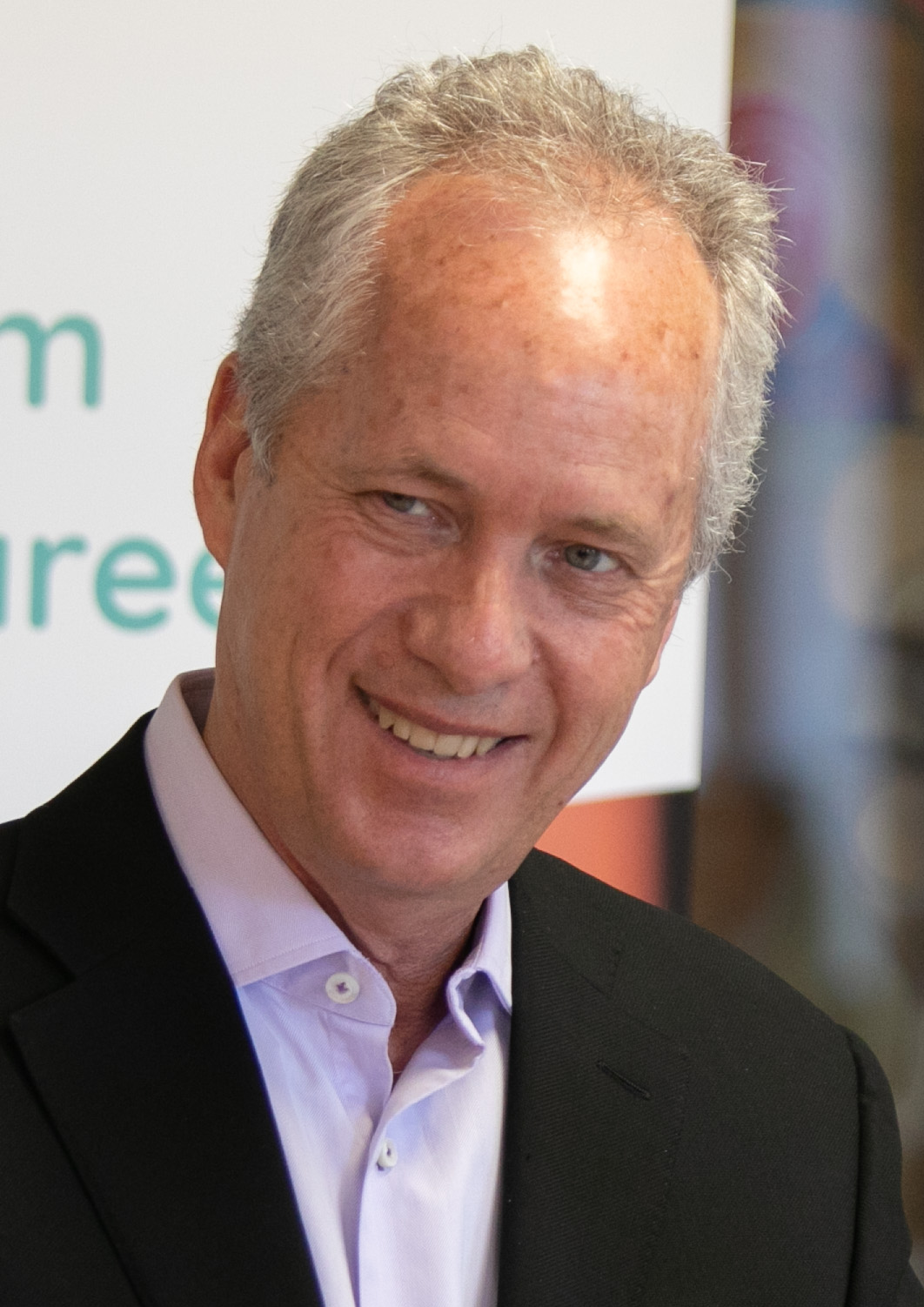

58th Mayor of Louisville
- In office January 3, 2011 – January 2, 2023
- Preceded by: Jerry Abramson
- Succeeded by: Craig Greenberg

78th President of the United States Conference of Mayors
- In office 2020–2021
- Preceded by: Bryan Barnett
- Succeeded by: Nan Whaley

Personal details
- Born: Gregory Fischer; January 14, 1958 (age 68) Louisville, Kentucky, U.S.
- Party: Democratic
- Spouse: Alexandra Gerassimides
- Children: 4
- Education: Vanderbilt University (BA)
- Website: gregfischer.com

Gregory Edward Fischer (born January 14, 1958) is an American businessman and entrepreneur who served as the second mayor of the consolidated city-county of "Louisville Metro" in Kentucky, from 2011 to 2023. In 2019, he was elected vice president of the U.S. Conference of Mayors, and in 2020, he served as its president.

Fischer ran in the Kentucky Democratic primary for the United States Senate in 2008, finishing second to Bruce Lunsford with 34% of the vote. In November 2010, he was elected mayor of Louisville in a tight race against Metro Council member Hal Heiner. He was reelected in 2014 and 2018, defeating Republican Metro Council member Angela Leet 61% to 37% to win a third term. Due to term limits, Fischer was ineligible to run for reelection as mayor in 2022.

Under Fischer's leadership as mayor, Louisville Metro gained 80,000 new jobs and 3,000 new businesses. In a 2016 Politico survey, he was recognized as the most innovative mayor in the U.S. In 2013, Governing magazine named Fischer its Public Official of the Year. The city has also attracted $24 billion in capital investment since the Great Recession, including a renovated and expanded convention center, dozens of new hotels and multiple tourist attractions centered around bourbon.

== Early life and education ==
Fischer was born in Louisville to Mary Lee and George Fischer, graduates of Loretto and Flaget High School in Louisville, respectively, and has four siblings. George was the CEO of MetriData Computing Inc. and Secretary of the Cabinet of Kentucky under Governor John Y. Brown Jr.

Fischer was raised in the Roman Catholic faith.

Fischer attended Trinity High School in the city and graduated in 1976. He has since been inducted as a member of the school's hall of fame. After high school, Fischer attended Vanderbilt University, where he majored in economics, graduating in 1980. To help pay for his education, Fischer worked summers as a crane operator on the fishing docks of Kodiak, Alaska, unloading salmon boats.

After graduation, Fischer traveled solo around the world for a year, spending the bulk of his trip in Asia, before returning to Louisville. He is married to Alexandra Gerassimides.

== Business career ==
Fischer co-founded SerVend International with his father, George, and brother, Mark. At age 25, he co-invented the SerVend combination ice and beverage dispenser (patent number 4,641,763). Over the course of the Fischer's involvement with SerVend, it grew into a global manufacturing business employing over 300 people. In 1998, SerVend was one of three U.S. small businesses to be honored with a site visit by the Malcolm Baldrige National Quality Award examiners. Also in 1998, Flomatic International, SerVend's valve manufacturing division, received the Oregon Quality Award. The Rochester Institute of Technology and USA Today gave SerVend a Quality Cup Award in the small business category in 1999. The Manitowoc Company purchased SerVend in 1997 for $78 million.

In 1990, Fischer, along with his father and brother, Mark, was named a winner of an award sponsored by Inc. magazine, Ernst & Young, Merrill Lynch and Business First. As Kentucky and Southern Indiana's Regional Entrepreneurs of the Year in the manufacturing division for their work with SerVend, they were among the finalists for Inc.'s U.S. Entrepreneur of the Year award.

In 2000, Fischer co-founded bCatalyst, a business accelerator that evolved into a mergers and acquisitions advisory firm. In 2010, Louisville-based Hilliard Lyons acquired bCatalyst.

Fischer was an investor and board member with MedVenture Technology. MedVenture, in Jeffersonville, Indiana, is an engineering outsourcer and early stage manufacturer on non-invasive medical devices for companies such as Johnson & Johnson, Boston Scientific, and Medtronic.

Until 2011, Fischer was part owner of Dant Clayton Corporation, a sports stadium design, manufacturing, and construction company with prominent sports-related projects around the U.S. In addition to his other ventures, he now serves as founder and chairman of Iceberg Ventures, a private investment firm in Louisville.

== Community life ==
Fischer held chapter offices, including chapter chair, in the Young Presidents' Organization Bluegrass chapter in 1997 and 1998. There, he led the YPO-funded construction of a Habitat for Humanity home and also created a community partnership with Louisville's Center for Interfaith Relations in 2003, resulting in bringing talent such as Robert McNamara to Louisville for community learning. In 2007, Fischer was awarded the first-ever Bluegrass YPO "Best of the Best" award for community contribution in 2007 for lifelong community service.

As past chairman of the Kentucky Science Center in 2001 and 2002, Fischer helped raise over $20 million to modernize the museum and create interactive children's programs. He has also endowed scholarships at Trinity High School and the University of Louisville. In 2006, Fischer received the Catholic Schools Distinguished Alumni Award from the Archdiocese of Louisville.

Fischer has been a guest lecturer at MIT and the University of Louisville, and was also an executive in residence at Indiana University Southeast in 1999 and 2000. He has served as a past board member of Crane House, an Asian cultural institute in Louisville, and Greater Louisville Inc.

== 2008 U.S. Senate campaign ==
Fischer was one of seven candidates in the 2008 Democratic primary for the U.S. Senate in Kentucky. He ran a five-month campaign and finished second with 34 percent of the vote.

Primary winner Bruce Lunsford went on to lose the general election to Republican incumbent Mitch McConnell.

== Mayor of Louisville Metro ==
=== Election history ===
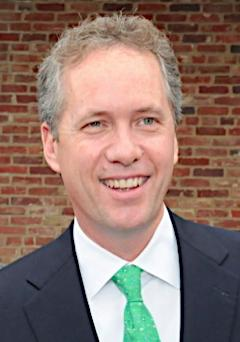
Fischer at the kickoff event for his mayoral campaign in October 2009

Fischer announced his candidacy for mayor of Louisville Metro in July 2009. On November 4, 2009, he became the first to file his letter of intent for the primary election on May 18, 2010.

A television advertisement for Fischer released in late March 2010 cited four priorities under his would-be administration: creating jobs, investing in clean energy, making metro government more transparent and building two new bridges over the Ohio River.

Fischer won the Democratic primary on May 18, 2010, with 45% of the vote. In the November 2 general election, he defeated Republican former council member Hal Heiner and two independent candidates with 51% of the vote.

On April 23, 2013, Fischer announced to a group of supporters that he would run for reelection in 2014. Fischer was reelected with 68.5% of the vote to Bob Devore's 31.3%. His inauguration took place on January 5, 2015.

On March 24, 2017, Fischer announced to a group of reporters that he would seek a third term in 2018. He won the Democratic primary on May 22, 2018, with approximately 75% of the vote. In the general election, he defeated Republican Metro Council member Angela Leet, 61% to 37%.

=== Tenure ===
Fischer was sworn in as the second Mayor of Louisville Metro Government, and the 50th Mayor of Louisville, Kentucky, on January 3, 2011.

Upon taking office, Fischer announced that the city would observe three core values: compassion, better health and lifelong learning.

He also launched efforts to foster a data-driven approach towards government efficiency. This included the creation of the Office for Performance Improvement & Innovation and the implementation of Louiestat, which "brings individual Metro departments before the Mayor and his senior leadership team every six to eight weeks to identify, through consistent metrics tracking and data analysis, what the department (and Metro Government) can do to continually improve the services it delivers to the citizens of Louisville." The city has been recognized as a leader in the use of data and in making data open and available to the public, and is one of only four cities to receive What Works Cities' Platinum Certification.

==== Economy ====
Fischer's administration focused on building the economy and creating opportunities for residents. Early in his tenure, Fischer convened a committee of residents to identify opportunities in the food and beverage industries, culminating in a 2013 report and the coining of the phrase "bourbonism".

The idea was to leverage the growing popularity of bourbon, which is largely produced in Kentucky, and Louisville's history with the beverage to create new economic opportunities in industries such as dining and tourism. The city now attracts 16 million tourists annually and has a dozen bourbon attractions, such as distilleries on the historic Main Street Whiskey Row.

Along with the redeveloped and expanded downtown convention center, bourbonism has been a factor in multiple new hotels opening in the city, including the Omni Louisville in 2018 and Moxy/Hotel Distil in October 2019.

Fischer's administration focused on attracting investment to lower-income neighborhoods, resulting in about $1.4 billion of investment in west Louisville. Among the investments in predominantly African American neighborhoods were the redevelopment of the Beecher Terrace public housing site through a $29.5 million federal grant, a new YMCA at the historic 18th Street and Broadway intersection, and a new indoor track and learning center by the Louisville Urban League with support from the city.

Fischer also focused on scaling Louisville's technology industry and talent pool. In 2019, Microsoft announced that Louisville would be its regional hub for artificial intelligence, internet of things, and data science. In 2013, Fischer worked to launch Code Louisville, a nationally recognized program that offers free coding training to Louisville residents. In June 2019, Fischer announced further efforts to scale Louisville's tech talent development efforts.

During Fischer's first nine years in office, the local economy added 80,000 jobs, 3,000 new businesses opened, and the net unemployment rate dropped from 10.2% in January 2011 to 3.3% in September 2019.

In 2014, Fischer cut ties with the regional commerce organization Greater Louisville Inc., citing concerns over the organization's financial stability and leadership. He then created a new Economic Development branch, Louisville Forward, creating 3,500 jobs and close to $500,000,000 in local investments its first 10 months, while being named one of the nation's top 10 economic development groups. But during Fischer's tenure, Louisville struggled to catch up to neighboring metropolitan areas in percentage of "high-paying jobs", ranking 9th out of 17 in the region.

=== Education ===
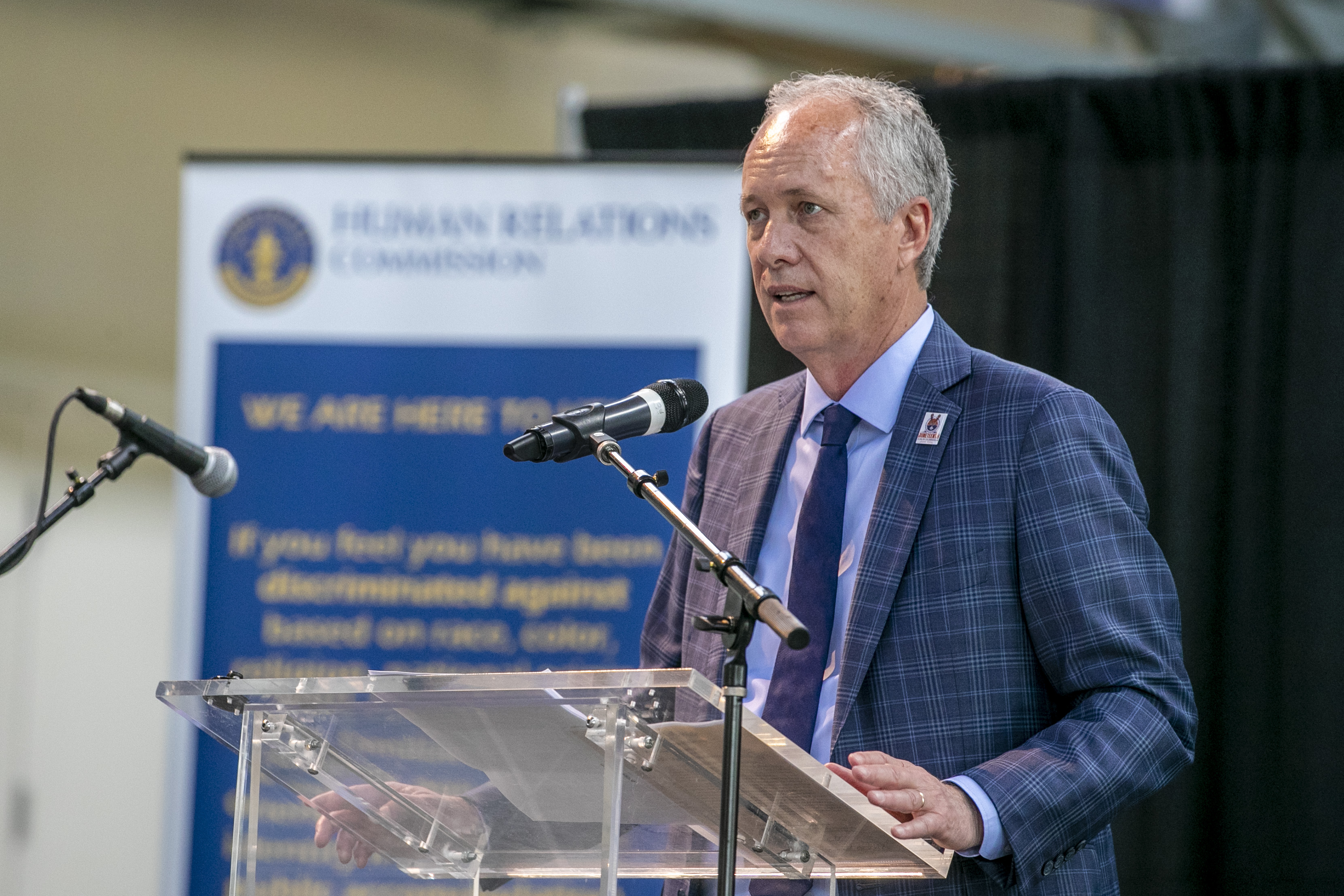
Greg Fischer speaking at a metro event in 2022

Three new regional libraries opened during Fischer's tenure, and several branches opened or were renovated, for a total of $55 million in investments. He also played an instrumental role in establishing Evolve502, which provides virtually all Jefferson County Public Schools graduates two tuition-free years of college through the Kentucky Community & Technical College System or Simmons College of Kentucky, plus "wraparound" services for students.

=== Health ===
Fischer led Louisville through the worst of the COVID-19 pandemic. Under his leadership, the city's focus on equity in testing, vaccinations and other resources led to no racial disparities in deaths, and the LouVax vaccination site was considered a national model.

=== Compassion ===
Citing his mother as an inspiration, Fischer launched Give A Day in April 2011 to encourage residents to volunteer or otherwise contribute to the community. The Give A Day Week of Service has since expanded to eight days and in 2019 broke Louisville's own world record for volunteerism and acts of compassion with 235,000. Louisville's commitment to compassion has been expressed in other ways, including in 2015 when hundreds turned out to clean hateful graffiti at a Louisville mosque, and in 2018 when the community again came together to clean hateful graffiti at a Hindu temple. In 2013, the Dalai Lama spent three days in Louisville to promote compassion. Fischer met the Dalai Lama again in 2018 during a working trip to India to promote compassion.

=== Muhammad Ali funeral ===
In June 2016, Fischer's administration played a leading role in facilitating the events surrounding the funeral of Muhammad Ali. In the following years, Louisville worked to further recognize Ali's history with the city, including new markers at sites significant in Ali's life. In January 2019, Fischer announced that the city's airport would be renamed Louisville Muhammad Ali International Airport.

=== Public art and equality conversation ===
In April 2016, Fischer announced the removal of a Confederate memorial on Third Street on the University of Louisville campus. On August 12, 2017, a white supremacist rally in Charlottesville, Virginia, turned violent. Various white supremacist groups protested the removal of a statue of former Confederate General Robert E. Lee. Later, Fischer announced that Louisville's Commission on Public Art would begin a review of public works in the city and collect a list of works that could be seen as "honoring bigotry, racism, and slavery". In the announcement, he said: "I recognize that some people say all these monuments should be left alone, because they are part of our history, but we need to discuss and interpret our history from multiple perspectives and from different viewpoints. That's why a community conversation is crucial. [...] Both our human values and the future of our city depend on our ability to directly address the challenges that stop each and every citizen from realizing their potential. We, as a compassionate community, must again come together and face up to the stain of slavery and racism, as we move toward a future that embraces diversity as a strength." The announcement came hours after a statue in Louisville's Cherokee Park depicting Confederate officer John Breckinridge Castleman was vandalized. In response to the vandalism, Fischer said, "For many, this statue is a beloved neighborhood landmark, but for others, it's a symbol of a painful, tragic and divisive time in our history—which gets at the complexity of this conversation."

On August 8, 2018, Fischer announced that the Castleman statue and a statue of George D. Prentice would be moved.

The next January, Fischer announced the launch of Lean Into Louisville, "an unprecedented series of presentations, conversations, activities and art exhibits that will explore and confront the history and legacy of all forms of discrimination and inequality in the city and the country."

=== Breonna Taylor ===
Breonna Taylor was a former Louisville EMT killed in her home in March 2020. Louisville Metro Police Department had received a warrant to search her residence and vehicle due to surveillance in an ongoing drug trafficking investigation which noted she had been seen at the home of her former boyfriend, a drug trafficker known to police. It was also confirmed by USPS that Taylor's former boyfriend had received packages at her home.

The warrant was issued as a "no knock" warrant. Both officers claimed that they knocked on four occasions and further claimed that Taylor's boyfriend at the time, Kenneth Walker, who was present, agreed that they had knocked. Police say they were also announcing, though Walker said he did not hear them identifying themselves. When police received no answer after the final episode of knocking they breached the door and were met with gunfire.

Taylor was struck several times and pronounced dead at the scene. Initially Walker told police it was Taylor who had shot at them but upon further questioning he admitted he had fired the gun, saying he believed it was a home invasion. Fischer's decision not to arrest the police officers, and the recent murder of George Floyd in Minneapolis led to widespread protests across Louisville.

On June 12, 2020, Fischer said he would sign "Breonna's Law" after it was passed unanimously by city council members. The law bans "no knock" warrants, a controversial procedure requested by LMPD police that led to the fatal shooting of Breonna Taylor. It was later determined that police did in fact knock, but whether they announced themselves as police is disputed, as the officers had turned off their body cams. Fischer called the LMPD's four-page incident report on Taylor's death "unacceptable", but did not call for the officers' arrest, citing the ongoing investigation by the Kentucky Attorney General. On July 16, 2020, it was announced that the Government Oversight and Audit Committee (GOA) of the Louisville Metro Council had officially launched an investigation "into the action and inaction of the Fischer Administration" in regard to the handling of the Taylor case and the death of David McAtee, as well as the handling of the resulting protests. McAtee was a Louisville business owner who responded with gunfire to the firing of pepper balls by LMPD and National Guardsmen enforcing a curfew upon protestors; he was shot by a Kentucky National Guardsman.

On September 17, 2020, The Louisville Metro Council approved legislation giving Fischer a list of steps to rebuild trust.

=== Reforms and "Reimagining Public Safety" ===
Fischer's administration, in partnership with Metro Council, implemented multiple reforms in 2020 and 2021, including the creation of a Civilian Police Review and Accountability Board; the adoption of the early intervention system of IAPro to track all use-of-force incidents, citizen complaints, internal investigations, and other key factors; and the creation of a pilot program to "deflect" a number of 911 calls to a non-police response "focused on problem-solving, de-escalation and referral to appropriate community services".

On December 1, 2020, Fischer declared racism a public health crisis in Louisville.

In 2021, Fischer's budget proposed quadrupling the city budget spending on public safety initiatives focused on community mobilization, prevention, intervention, enforcement, organizational change and development, and reentry programs. The programs included the adoption of Group Violence Intervention and additional funding for the city's Office for Safe and Healthy Neighborhoods, including community violence intervention programs.

=== Louisville minimum wage increase ===
In November 2014, the Louisville City Council proposed raising the minimum wage to $10.10 an hour. Through a spokesman, Fischer said he supported raising the minimum wage at the federal level so it is "uniform nationwide", but did not say what hourly rate he favored. He also said that the city should hear from businesses, advocates, citizens, and faith groups before any changes were made. On December 18, Fischer announced that he and the Metro Council had compromised and that Louisville would raise its hourly minimum wage to $9 over three years. The ordinance also included numerous exceptions found in other minimum wage laws, most notably excluding agricultural workers. On October 20, 2016, the Kentucky Supreme Court overturned the city's minimum wage laws, reversing an earlier ruling by a Jefferson County judge and holding that hourly wages are regulated at the state level and that Louisville's ordinance conflicted with state law. In response, Fischer and a majority of the Metro Council called on the Kentucky General Assembly to allow the city to set its own minimum wage law.

=== California state travel ban ===
On June 22, 2017, California Attorney General Xavier Becerra announced that he was working on banning state-funded travel to Kentucky in response to a bill signed by Kentucky Governor Matt Bevin. The law was designed to reinforce students' ability to express religious and political views in public schools and universities. But the bill also said religious and political student organizations cannot be hindered or discriminated against for how they conduct their internal affairs or select their leaders and members. Critics said those provisions could be used to let student groups prevent LGBTQ students from joining their ranks. On June 26, 2017, Fischer and Lexington Mayor Jim Gray sent the California Attorney General's Office a letter asking that their cities be excluded from the ban. "Please consider exempting cities like Louisville from your travel ban", the letter states. "It is my belief that cities like ours should be rewarded for an inclusive behavior, not penalized; a waiver would highlight our inclusivity and encourage other cities to follow accordingly." A week later, Becerra replied that California could lift the ban only if city officials were able to "make progress with leaders in your state" to repeal or amend the law.

On June 27, 2017, Fischer announced on Twitter that the city was already feeling negative effects of the ban, citing an "unnamed convention" that had allegedly chosen to move its venue elsewhere as a show of solidarity with the ban. He elaborated on Facebook, writing, "We are very concerned about others [leaving]" and "Tourism/conventions are a key driver of our economy." A few days later, Karen Williams, president and CEO of the Louisville Convention and Visitors Bureau, announced in a press conference with Fischer that a second convention had pulled out of the city. Williams said one convention was slated for 2018 and the other for 2021, but declined to name them because they are "still looking for other venues outside the city". She said both groups were based in Chicago and one was a "medical association" and the other a "prestigious research association".

Louisville received a perfect score for eight consecutive years on the Human Rights Campaign's Municipal Index.

=== Assault ===
On June 19, 2022, Fischer was punched while attending community events at Fourth Street Live! A suspect was arrested and charged with one count of assault in the fourth degree. The next day, Fischer said: "I channeled my inner Muhammad Ali and said 'you've got to get right back up', so I'm glad to see I can still take a punch."

== Electoral history ==
=== United States Senate ===
==== 2008 ====
Democratic primary results
Party	Candidate	Votes	%
Democratic	Bruce Lunsford	316,992	51.15%
Democratic	Greg Fischer	209,827	33.85%
Democratic	David L. Williams	34,363	5.54%
Democratic	Michael Cassaro	17,340	2.80%
Democratic	Kenneth Stepp	13,451	2.17%
Democratic	David Wylie	7,528	1.21%
Democratic	James E. Rice	2,365	3.28%
Total votes		619,904	100.00%

=== Mayor of Louisville Metro ===
==== 2010 ====
Louisville mayoral election, 2010
Party	Candidate	Votes	%	±%
Democratic	Greg Fischer	132,050	51.10%	−16.09%
Republican	Hal Heiner	125,178	48.44%	+17.18%
Independent	Nimbus Couzin	499	0.19%	
Independent	Jerry T. Mills	474	0.18%	
Write-ins		200	0.08%	
Majority		6,872	2.66%	−33.27%
Turnout		258,401		
Democratic hold		Swing		

==== 2014 ====
Louisville mayoral election, 2014
Party	Candidate	Votes	%	±%
Democratic	Greg Fischer	172,810	68.55%	+17.45%
Republican	Bob DeVore	78,870	31.3%	−17.14%
Write-ins		511	0.2%	
Majority		93,940	37.2%	+34.54%
Turnout		251,680		
Democratic hold		Swing		

==== 2018 ====
Louisville mayoral election, 2018
Party	Candidate	Votes	%	±%
Democratic	Greg Fischer	177,749	61.33%	−7.22%
Republican	Angela Leet	105,853	36.53%	+5.23%
Independent	Jackie Green	1,979	0.68%	
Independent	Chris Thieneman	1,296	0.45%	
Independent	Sean Vandevander	995	0.34%	
Independent	Billy Ralls	873	0.30%	
Independent	Henry Owens III	415	0.14%	
Independent	Douglas Edward Lattimore	315	0.11%	
Independent	Isaac Marion Thacker IV	306	0.11%	
Majority		71,896	24.81%	−12.39%
Turnout		289,781	100%	+13.15%
Democratic hold		Swing		

== See also ==
- Louisville Metro Council
- Government of Louisville, Kentucky
- List of mayors of the 50 largest cities in the United States

Political offices
Preceded by Jerry Abramson	Mayor of Louisville; 2011–2023	Succeeded by Craig Greenberg
