= Chris Thieneman =

American gridiron football player (born 1965)

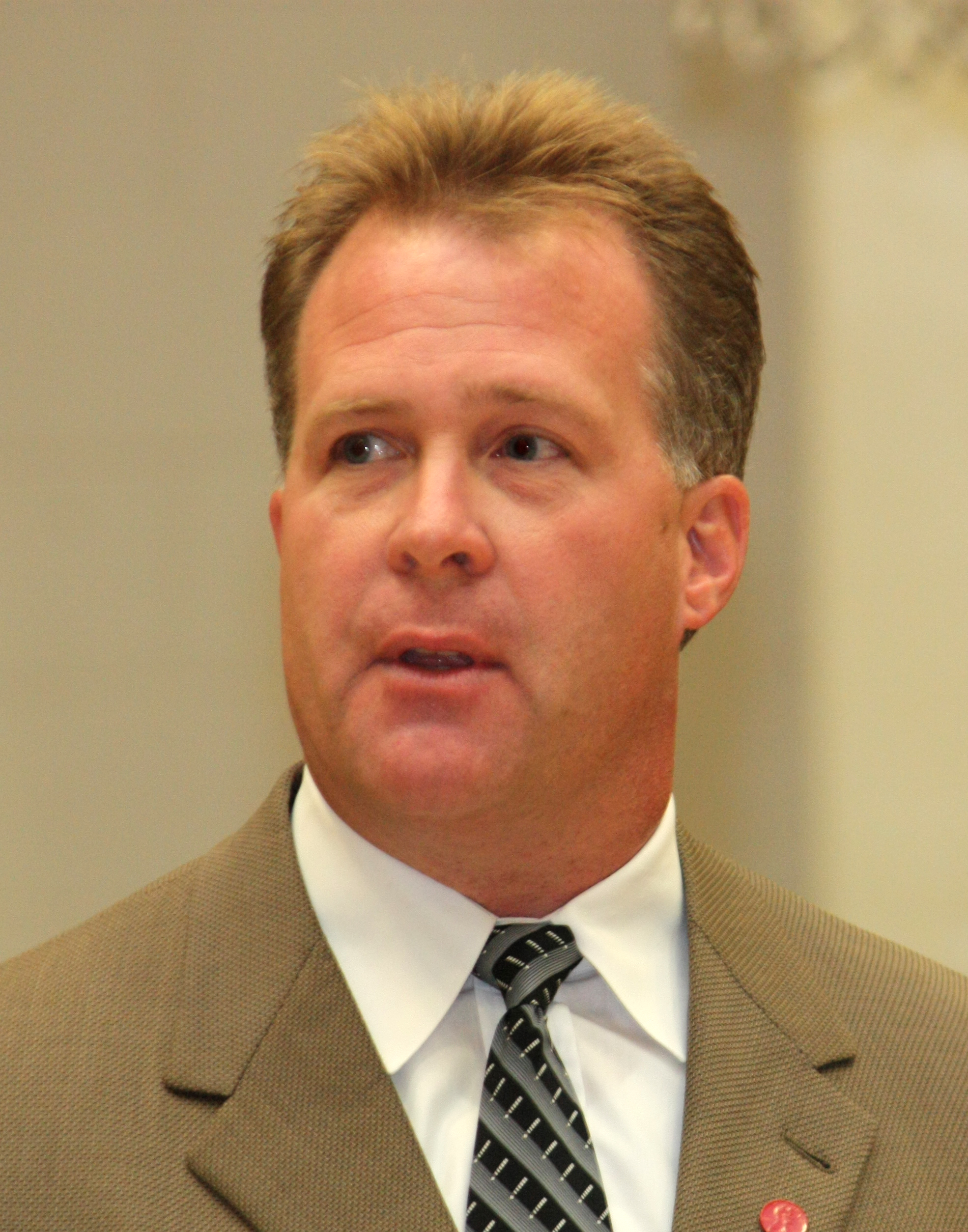
- Thieneman in November 2009

No. 75, 91
- Position: Defensive tackle / Defensive end

Personal information
- Born: June 6, 1965 (age 61); Louisville, Kentucky

Career information
- College: Louisville
- NFL draft: 1988: undrafted

Career history
- Dallas Cowboys (1988) *; Saskatchewan Roughriders (1991); San Antonio Riders (1992); Sacramento Gold Miners (1993–1994)

Awards and highlights
- AP Second Team All-South Independent (1986); All-World League (1992)

Christopher Allen Thieneman (born June 6, 1965) is a former American college football player who was a defensive lineman in the World League of American Football (WLAF) and the Canadian Football League (CFL) during the early 1990s. He played for the San Antonio Riders of the WLAF, and the Sacramento Gold Miners of the CFL. Thieneman played collegiately at the University of Louisville, where he was an honorable mention All-American.

Later, he returned to Kentucky and took over the family business which included development and real estate.

As a Republican (later switching to Independent) he also ran for the Mayor of Louisville, the Kentucky State House of Representatives, and the Kentucky State Senate, losing all three times. He has also been accused of bribery, perjury, and assault. All of those allegations were found as not guilty.

== Early life ==
Thieneman was born and raised in Louisville, Kentucky. He attended Bishop David High School where he lettered three years in football as a defensive end. During his senior year, he earned All-County, All-District and All-State honors. Following graduation, Thieneman enrolled at the University of Louisville after being recruited to play college football for the Cardinals by coach Bob Weber. He played his first two seasons as a backup linebacker before being redshirted in 1985 due to a shoulder injury. Under coach Howard Schnellenberger, Thieneman returned to the football field in 1986, making the switch to the defensive tackle position. As a junior, he recorded 53 tackles (40 solo) and earned honorable mention All-America honors by the Associated Press, which also named him to the All-South Independent team. He graduated with a bachelor's degree in business management.

== Professional football career ==
In 1988, Thieneman signed as an undrafted free agent with the Dallas Cowboys as a defensive end, but did not appear in a single regular-season game and was released from the offseason practice squad. He played professional football in Canada for four years, ending his career in the Canadian Football League with the Sacramento Gold Miners.

== Political career ==
After football, Thieneman began working in the family real estate business and obtained a real estate license. Thieneman took over operation of the family business and established his own development company. His developments include trailer parks, family-based subdivisions, low-income apartments and office complexes in the Greater Louisville Metro area. Thieneman is one of the largest owners of vacant property on Dixie Highway.

Thieneman ran in the Republican primary for Congress in Kentucky's 3rd congressional district in 2008. In May 2010, Thieneman ran for Mayor of Louisville in the Republican primary but lost to Hal Heiner. Heiner would eventually lose narrowly to current Louisville Mayor Greg Fischer.

In Spring of 2012, Thieneman filed to run for 37th district's state senate seat, narrowly defeating former Metro Councilman Doug Hawkins in the Republican primary in May. Thieneman lost by a wide margin in the general election to incumbent Democrat State Senator Perry Clark.

Despite numerous attempts, Thieneman has never won election to any public office.

=== Bribery ===
In 2010, during his campaign for Louisville mayor, Thieneman participated in an interview with the Courier-Journal editorial board to seek the newspaper's endorsement. In the interview, Thieneman admitted to bribing a county official in order to get approval for a trailer park from the local planning commission despite heavy opposition from nearby residents. The request was granted by the planning commission, and a trailer park was built along a narrow piece of land in the middle of a middle-class neighborhood.

=== Residency ===
In the fall of 2012, it was alleged by a local blog that Thieneman did not reside in the district in which he filed to represent. Thieneman has repeatedly denied that he lives outside the district, but depositions by citizens, photographic evidence, and voting records suggest Thieneman has multiple residences in Jefferson County, Kentucky. The residence in question is the location of a Thieneman-owned commercial business - a self-storage locker business.

In October 2012, a lawsuit was filed by district resident Robert Walker that challenged Thieneman's residency. The suit alleged Thieneman did not live in the 37th district and therefore was not a legal candidate. Judge Charles Cunningham ordered on November 2, 2012, that Thieneman produce utility bills from his supposed residence at the storage business as well as a home Thieneman owns on Brownsboro Road. The utility bills were supposed to have proven exactly where Thieneman was living, but the judge's order was never fulfilled by Thieneman and the case was passed.

== Personal life ==
Thieneman is one of the original founders of the Mint Jubilee, a Kentucky Derby-themed charity event that raises money for The James Brown Cancer Center in Louisville. The event has been mired in controversy and was alleged to have misappropriated funds originally meant for the charity.

In 2013, Thieneman was charged with assault and wanton endangerment when he was accused of choking his ex-girlfriend during an argument. The woman was granted an Emergency Protective Order of restraint from Thieneman. He was again arrested on May 29, 2014, for intimidating his ex-girlfriend, violating his EPO/DVO and retaliating against a participant in a legal process. Thieneman was eventually found not guilty of these assault charges.

Thieneman and his wife, Nikki, appeared on multiple episodes of the 5th season of 90 Day Fiance as the friend of cast member David Toborowsky.

Thieneman and his wife have two children together.
