= Kentucky's 46th House of Representatives district =

American legislative district

Kentucky's 46th State House of Representatives district
Representative
Al Gentry; D–Louisville
since January 1, 2017
- Registration: 53.8% Democratic; 33.9% Republican; 11.6% No party preference
- Demographics: 61.8% White; 20.4% Black; 10.9% Hispanic; 1.9% Asian; 0.1% Hawaiian/Pacific Islander; 0.2% Other; 4.9% Multiracial
- Population (2024): 47,157
- Registered voters (2026): 33,847

Kentucky's 46th House of Representatives district is one of 100 districts in the Kentucky House of Representatives. It comprises part of Jefferson County. It has been represented by Al Gentry (D–Louisville) since 2017. As of 2024, the district had a population of 47,157.

== Voter registration ==
On January 1, 2026, the district had 33,847 registered voters, who were registered with the following parties.

Party	Registration	
Party	Voters	%
Democratic	18,201	53.77
Republican	11,482	33.92
Independent	1,845	5.45
Libertarian	165	0.49
Green	27	0.08
Constitution	22	0.06
Socialist Workers	11	0.03
Reform	2	0.01
"Other"	2,092	6.18
Total	33,847	100.00

== List of members representing the district ==
Member	Party	Years	Electoral history	District location
Harold Haering (Louisville)	Republican	January 1, 1978 – January 1, 1984	Elected in 1977. Reelected in 1979. Reelected in 1981. Resigned after being elected to the Kentucky Senate.	1974–1985; Jefferson County (part).
Larry Clark (Louisville)	Democratic	January 26, 1984 – January 1, 2017	Elected to finish Haering's term. Reelected in 1984. Reelected in 1986. Reelected in 1988. Reelected in 1990. Reelected in 1992. Reelected in 1994. Reelected in 1996. Reelected in 1998. Reelected in 2000. Reelected in 2002. Reelected in 2004. Reelected in 2006. Reelected in 2008. Reelected in 2010. Reelected in 2012. Reelected in 2014. Retired.	1974–1985; Jefferson County (part).
Larry Clark (Louisville)	Democratic	January 26, 1984 – January 1, 2017	Elected to finish Haering's term. Reelected in 1984. Reelected in 1986. Reelected in 1988. Reelected in 1990. Reelected in 1992. Reelected in 1994. Reelected in 1996. Reelected in 1998. Reelected in 2000. Reelected in 2002. Reelected in 2004. Reelected in 2006. Reelected in 2008. Reelected in 2010. Reelected in 2012. Reelected in 2014. Retired.	1985–1993; Jefferson County (part).
Larry Clark (Louisville)	Democratic	January 26, 1984 – January 1, 2017	Elected to finish Haering's term. Reelected in 1984. Reelected in 1986. Reelected in 1988. Reelected in 1990. Reelected in 1992. Reelected in 1994. Reelected in 1996. Reelected in 1998. Reelected in 2000. Reelected in 2002. Reelected in 2004. Reelected in 2006. Reelected in 2008. Reelected in 2010. Reelected in 2012. Reelected in 2014. Retired.	1993–1997; Jefferson County (part).
Larry Clark (Louisville)	Democratic	January 26, 1984 – January 1, 2017	Elected to finish Haering's term. Reelected in 1984. Reelected in 1986. Reelected in 1988. Reelected in 1990. Reelected in 1992. Reelected in 1994. Reelected in 1996. Reelected in 1998. Reelected in 2000. Reelected in 2002. Reelected in 2004. Reelected in 2006. Reelected in 2008. Reelected in 2010. Reelected in 2012. Reelected in 2014. Retired.	1997–2003
Larry Clark (Louisville)	Democratic	January 26, 1984 – January 1, 2017	Elected to finish Haering's term. Reelected in 1984. Reelected in 1986. Reelected in 1988. Reelected in 1990. Reelected in 1992. Reelected in 1994. Reelected in 1996. Reelected in 1998. Reelected in 2000. Reelected in 2002. Reelected in 2004. Reelected in 2006. Reelected in 2008. Reelected in 2010. Reelected in 2012. Reelected in 2014. Retired.	2003–2015
Larry Clark (Louisville)	Democratic	January 26, 1984 – January 1, 2017	Elected to finish Haering's term. Reelected in 1984. Reelected in 1986. Reelected in 1988. Reelected in 1990. Reelected in 1992. Reelected in 1994. Reelected in 1996. Reelected in 1998. Reelected in 2000. Reelected in 2002. Reelected in 2004. Reelected in 2006. Reelected in 2008. Reelected in 2010. Reelected in 2012. Reelected in 2014. Retired.	2015–2023
Al Gentry (Louisville)	Democratic	January 1, 2017 – present	Elected in 2016. Reelected in 2018. Reelected in 2020. Reelected in 2022. Reelected in 2024. Reelected in 2026.	2015–2023
Al Gentry (Louisville)	Democratic	January 1, 2017 – present	Elected in 2016. Reelected in 2018. Reelected in 2020. Reelected in 2022. Reelected in 2024. Reelected in 2026.	2023–present
