= 2022 Louisville mayoral election =

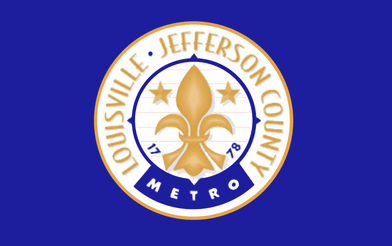
- November 8, 2022
- Turnout: 277,853
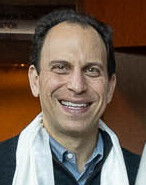

Nominee	Craig Greenberg	Bill Dieruf
Party	Democratic	Republican
Popular vote	143,779	128,690
Percentage	51.7%	46.3%
- Precinct results Greenberg: 40–50% 50–60% 60–70% 70–80% 80–90% >90% Dieruf: 40–50% 50–60% 60–70% 70–80% 80–90% >90% Tie: 30–40% 40–50% No votes
Mayor before election
Greg Fischer
Democratic
Elected mayor
Craig Greenberg
Democratic

The 2022 Louisville mayoral election was the sixth quadrennial Louisville Metro mayoral election, held on November 8, 2022. Incumbent Democratic mayor Greg Fischer was term-limited and could not seek reelection to a fourth term in office.

On February 14, 2022, mayoral candidate Craig Greenberg survived an assassination attempt. The suspected assassin was a racial justice activist seen at George Floyd protests in 2020, but it is unclear if the attempted assassination was motivated by political beliefs. Controversy ensued when the Louisville Community Bail Fund subsequently posted a $100,000 bond for his release.

On May 17, 2022, the primary election was held. Greenberg and Republican Bill Dieruf won their respective primaries and advanced to the general election in November. Greenberg defeated Dieruf in the election.

== Democratic primary ==
=== Candidates ===
==== Nominee ====
- Craig Greenberg, attorney and businessman

==== Eliminated in primary ====
- Tim Findley Jr., pastor, activist, and community leader
- Skylar Beckett Graudick, former police officer and lobbyist
- Colin J. Hardin, restaurant worker
- Sergio Alexander Lopez, businessman and U.S. Census Bureau clerk
- David Nicholson, circuit court clerk
- Shameka Parrish-Wright, Co-chair of the Kentucky Alliance Against Racist and Political Repression and manager of the Louisville Bail Project
- Anthony Oxendine

==== Withdrawn ====
- David James, President of the Louisville Metro Council (endorsed Greenberg)
- Carla Dearing, businesswoman and entrepreneur

==== Declined ====
- Sadiqa Reynolds, president and CEO of the Urban League of Louisville
- Charles Booker, former state representative and candidate for U.S. Senate in 2020 (running for U.S. Senate)
- Morgan McGarvey, minority leader of the Kentucky Senate (2019–present), state senator from the 19th district (2013–present) (running for U.S. House)
- Attica Scott, state representative from the 41st district (2017–present) (endorsed Parrish-Wright)
- Barbara Sexton Smith, businesswoman and former member of the Louisville Metro Council from the 4th district (endorsed Greenberg)

=== Endorsements ===
Craig Greenberg

Statewide officials

- Andy Beshear, governor of Kentucky (2019–present)

Local officials

- Jerry Abramson, former mayor of Louisville (2003–2011) (post primary)
- Cassie Chambers Armstrong, Louisville Metro Councilwoman from the 8th district (2020–present)
- Keisha Dorsey, Louisville Metro Councilwoman from the 3rd district (2019–present)
- Nicole George, Louisville Metro Councilwoman from the 21st district (2019–present)
- David James, Louisville Metro Councilman from the 6th district (2011–present), President of the Louisville Metro Council (2018–present)
- Donna Purvis, Louisville Metro Councilwoman from the 5th district (2019–present)
- Barbara Sexton Smith, businesswoman and former member of the Louisville Metro Council from the 4th district
- Markus Winkler, Louisville Metro Councilman from the 17th district (2019–present)

Organizations

- Planned Parenthood Action Kentucky

Labor unions

- ATU Local 1447
- AFSCME Local 2629
- IUE-CWA Locals 83761 & 3310
- Teamsters Local 783
- LiUNA Local 576
- NCFO/SEIU Kentucky
Shameka Parrish-Wright

State legislators

- Attica Scott, state representative from the 41st district (2017–present)

=== Results ===
Democratic primary results
Party	Candidate	Votes	%
Democratic	Craig Greenberg	34,115	41.4%
Democratic	Shameka Parrish-Wright	17,730	21.5%
Democratic	David Nicholson	14,123	17.1%
Democratic	Tim Findley, Jr.	12,672	15.4%
Democratic	Sergio Alexander Lopez	1,303	1.6%
Democratic	Colin J. Hardin	1,066	1.3%
Democratic	Skylar Beckett Graudick	1,030	1.2%
Democratic	Anthony Oxendine	365	0.4%
Total votes		82,404	100.0%

== Republican primary ==
=== Candidates ===
==== Nominee ====
- Bill Dieruf, mayor of Jeffersontown

==== Eliminated in primary ====
- Chartrael Hall, minister and community speaker
- Philip Molestina, businessman and minister
- Rob Stark Reishman Jr.

=== Results ===
Republican primary results
Party	Candidate	Votes	%
Republican	Bill Dieruf	30,088	78.20%
Republican	Chartrael Hall	4,291	11.15%
Republican	Rob Stark Reishman, Jr.	2,190	5.70%
Republican	Philip Molestina	1,905	4.95%
Total votes		38,474	100.0%

== Third parties ==
=== Socialist Workers Party ===
==== Declared ====
- Margaret Trowe, activist and perennial candidate

=== Independents ===
- Robert Eberenz
- David R. Ellenberger
- Taylor Everett
- Martina Nichols Kunnecke
- Manetta C. Lemkheitir
- John Mace

== General election ==
=== Results ===
2022 Louisville mayoral election
Party	Candidate	Votes	%	±%
Democratic	Craig Greenberg	143,779	51.7%	−10.4%
Republican	Bill Dieruf	128,690	46.3%	+10.2%
Independent	Martina Nichols Kunnecke	1,689	0.6%	
Economic Freedom Party (United States)	Isaac Thacker	1,215	0.4%	
Independent	Taylor Everett	584	0.2%	
Independent	Manetta C. Lemkheitir	493	0.2%	
Independent	David R. Ellenberger	448	0.2%	
Independent	Robert Eberenz	265	0.1%	
Independent	John Mace	259	0.1%	
Write-in		431	0.2%	
Total votes		277,853	100.0%	
