= Al Gentry (politician) =

American politician

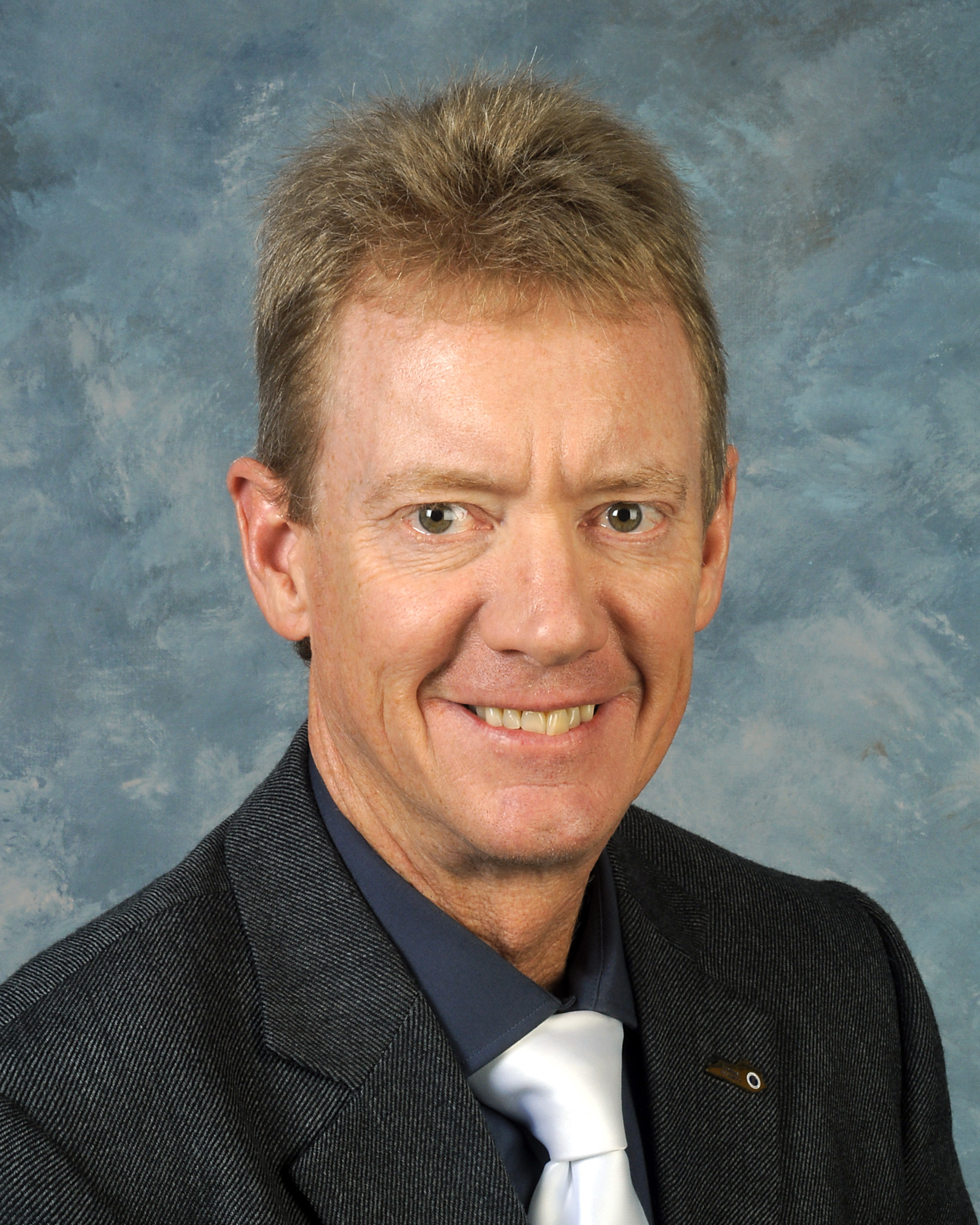

Member of the Kentucky House of Representatives from the 46th district
- Incumbent
- Assumed office January 1, 2017
- Preceded by: Larry Clark

Personal details
- Born: October 12, 1964 (age 61)
- Party: Democratic
- Education: University of Louisville (B.S.); University of Kentucky (Grad.)
- Profession: Entrepreneur

Alan Joseph Gentry (born October 12, 1964) is an American politician and a Democratic member of the Kentucky House of Representatives representing District 46 since 2017. He served as House Minority Caucus Chair from 2024 to 2025.

Gentry is an advocate of legalized sports betting, and he co-sponsored a bill to legalize it in the state of Kentucky. He has also supported the legalization of medical cannabis.

In 2024, Gentry was elected as caucus chair of the Kentucky House of Representatives Democrats. In November 2025, he stepped down from his leadership role to create an "adaptive golf" course—a course that allows individuals with disabilities to play golf with different rules and equipment.

== Personal life ==
In 1993, Gentry lost his right arm in a drilling accident.
