= 2014 Louisville mayoral election =

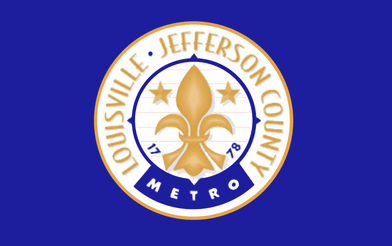
- November 4, 2014
- Turnout: 251,680
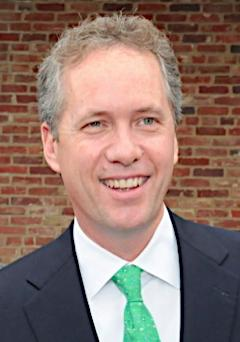

Nominee	Greg Fischer	Bob DeVore
Party	Democratic	Republican
Popular vote	172,810	78,870
Percentage	68.5%	31.3%

The 2014 Louisville mayoral election was the fourth quadrennial Louisville Metro mayoral election, held on Tuesday, November 4, 2014. The Democratic ticket of incumbent mayor and businessman Greg Fischer was elected to his second term. He defeated the Republican ticket of former McCreary County School Board member Bob DeVore.

== Declarations ==
On April 23, 2013, Fischer announced to a group of supporters that he would be running for reelection in the 2014 General Election.

On January 28, 2014, just a day before the filing deadline, former McCreary County School Board member Bob DeVore announced his candidacy to challenge Mayor Greg Fischer. According to Nathan Haney, then-Chairman of the Jefferson County Republican Party, DeVore was not recruited by the party, nor did they have any advance notice of DeVore declaring his candidacy.

== Primaries ==
Both candidates went unopposed in their respective primaries.

== Results ==
Louisville mayoral election, 2014
Party	Candidate	Votes	%	±%
Democratic	Greg Fischer (incumbent)	172,810	68.55%	+30.8%
Republican	Bob DeVore	78,870	31.3%	−36.9%
Write-ins		511	0.002%	negligible
Majority		93,940	37.2%	+1,396.6%
Turnout		251,680	100%	−2.6%
Democratic hold		Swing		

Greg Fischer, the incumbent Democratic mayor of Louisville, defeated Bob DeVore, a Republican, tallying 68.5% of the vote to DeVore's 31.3%, with 0.002% of the vote going to various write-in candidates such as Jackie Green, who ran as an Independent against Fischer in 2010.
