= Kentucky's 14th Senate district =

American legislative district

Kentucky's 14th State Senate district
Senator
Jimmy Higdon; R–Lebanon
since December 16, 2009
- Registration: 48.7% Republican; 42.3% Democratic; 8.5% No party preference
- Demographics: 89.6% White; 4.3% Black; 2.7% Hispanic; 0.4% Asian; 0.2% Other; 2.7% Multiracial
- Population (2023): 113,776
- Registered voters (2025): 88,609

Kentucky's 14th Senatorial district is one of 38 districts in the Kentucky Senate. Located in the central part of the state, it comprises the counties of LaRue, Marion, Nelson, Spencer, and Washington. It has been represented by Jimmy Higdon (R–Lebanon) since 2009. As of 2023, the district had a population of 113,776.

== Voter registration ==
On January 1, 2025, the district had 88,609 registered voters, who were registered with the following parties.

Party	Registration	
Party	Voters	%
Republican	43,157	48.70
Democratic	37,451	42.27
Independent	3,308	3.73
Libertarian	353	0.40
Green	55	0.06
Constitution	32	0.04
Socialist Workers	11	0.01
Reform	4	0.00
"Other"	4,238	4.78
Total	88,609	100.00
Source: Kentucky State Board of Elections

== Election results from statewide races ==
=== 2014 – 2020 ===
Year	Office	Results (Note: Figures presented in this table are calculated by summing precinct election results published by the Kentucky State Board of Elections, using precinct data that list each precinct's senatorial district.)
2014	Senator	McConnell 55.9 - 41.4%
2015	Governor	Bevin 54.9 - 41.8%
2015	Secretary of State	Grimes 50.1 - 49.9%
2015	Attorney General	Westerfield 52.2 - 47.8%
2015	Auditor of Public Accounts	Harmon 51.5 - 48.5%
2015	State Treasurer	Ball 63.6 - 36.4%
2015	Commissioner of Agriculture	Quarles 60.8 - 39.2%
2016	President	Trump 66.9 - 28.7%
2016	Senator	Paul 59.6 - 40.4%
2019	Governor	Bevin 52.4 - 45.7%
2019	Secretary of State	Adams 52.2 - 47.8%
2019	Attorney General	Cameron 62.8 - 37.2%
2019	Auditor of Public Accounts	Harmon 58.6 - 38.5%
2019	State Treasurer	Ball 64.7 - 35.3%
2019	Commissioner of Agriculture	Quarles 61.0 - 35.8%
2020	President	Trump 67.9 - 30.5%
2020	Senator	McConnell 62.4 - 33.2%
2020	Amendment 1	Yes 62.2 - 37.8%
2020	Amendment 2	No 68.5 - 31.5%

=== 2022 – present ===
Year	Office	Results
2022	Senator	Paul 69.3 - 30.7%
2022	Amendment 1	No 51.4 - 48.6%
2022	Amendment 2	Yes 54.0 - 46.0%
2023	Governor	Cameron 54.3 - 45.7%
2023	Secretary of State	Adams 66.5 - 33.4%
2023	Attorney General	Coleman 65.9 - 34.1%
2023	Auditor of Public Accounts	Ball 68.3 - 31.7%
2023	State Treasurer	Metcalf 64.2 - 35.8%
2023	Commissioner of Agriculture	Shell 62.9 - 37.1%
2024	President	Trump 73.5 - 25.2%
2024	Amendment 1	Yes 66.5 - 33.5%
2024	Amendment 2	No 63.3 - 36.7%

== List of members representing the district ==
Member	Party	Years	Electoral history	District location
J. D. "Jiggs" Buckman (Shepherdsville)	Democratic	January 1, 1966 – January 1, 1970	Redistricted from the 12th district and reelected in 1965. Lost renomination.	1964–1972
William R. Gentry Jr. (Bardstown)	Democratic	January 1, 1970 – March 1976	Elected in 1969. Reelected in 1973. Resigned to become a member of the Kentucky Public Service Commission.	1964–1972
William R. Gentry Jr. (Bardstown)	Democratic	January 1, 1970 – March 1976	Elected in 1969. Reelected in 1973. Resigned to become a member of the Kentucky Public Service Commission.	1972–1974
William R. Gentry Jr. (Bardstown)	Democratic	January 1, 1970 – March 1976	Elected in 1969. Reelected in 1973. Resigned to become a member of the Kentucky Public Service Commission.	1974–1984
Randall Donahue (Loretto)	Democratic	December 1976 – January 1, 1978	Elected to finish Gentry's term. Lost renomination.	1974–1984
Ed O'Daniel (Springfield)	Democratic	January 1, 1978 – January 1, 1991	Elected in 1977. Reelected in 1981. Reelected in 1986. Lost reelection.	1974–1984
Ed O'Daniel (Springfield)	Democratic	January 1, 1978 – January 1, 1991	Elected in 1977. Reelected in 1981. Reelected in 1986. Lost reelection.	1984–1993; Anderson, Boyle, Marion, Nelson, and Washington Counties.
Dan Kelly (Springfield)	Republican	January 1, 1991 – October 26, 2009	Elected in 1990. Reelected in 1994. Reelected in 1998. Reelected in 2002. Reelected in 2006. Resigned to become a Judge of the 11th Circuit Court.	1984–1993; Anderson, Boyle, Marion, Nelson, and Washington Counties.
Dan Kelly (Springfield)	Republican	January 1, 1991 – October 26, 2009	Elected in 1990. Reelected in 1994. Reelected in 1998. Reelected in 2002. Reelected in 2006. Resigned to become a Judge of the 11th Circuit Court.	1993–1997
Dan Kelly (Springfield)	Republican	January 1, 1991 – October 26, 2009	Elected in 1990. Reelected in 1994. Reelected in 1998. Reelected in 2002. Reelected in 2006. Resigned to become a Judge of the 11th Circuit Court.	1997–2003
Dan Kelly (Springfield)	Republican	January 1, 1991 – October 26, 2009	Elected in 1990. Reelected in 1994. Reelected in 1998. Reelected in 2002. Reelected in 2006. Resigned to become a Judge of the 11th Circuit Court.	2003–2015
Jimmy Higdon (Lebanon)	Republican	December 16, 2009 – present	Elected to finish Kelly's term. Reelected in 2010. Reelected in 2014. Reelected in 2018. Reelected in 2022. Retired.	2003–2015
Jimmy Higdon (Lebanon)	Republican	December 16, 2009 – present	Elected to finish Kelly's term. Reelected in 2010. Reelected in 2014. Reelected in 2018. Reelected in 2022. Retired.	2015–2023
Jimmy Higdon (Lebanon)	Republican	December 16, 2009 – present	Elected to finish Kelly's term. Reelected in 2010. Reelected in 2014. Reelected in 2018. Reelected in 2022. Retired.	2023–present
Ben Mudd (Lebanon)	Republican	Assuming office January 1, 2027	Elected in 2026.	2023–present
