= Kentucky's 8th Senate district =

American legislative district

Kentucky's 8th State Senate district
Senator
Gary Boswell; R–Owensboro
since January 1, 2023
- Registration: 46.5% Republican; 43.8% Democratic; 9.0% No party preference
- Demographics: 86.8% White; 3.8% Black; 3.7% Hispanic; 1.9% Asian; 0.2% Native American; 0.6% Other; 3.1% Multiracial
- Population (2023): 121,354
- Registered voters (2025): 93,005

Kentucky's 8th Senatorial district is one of 38 districts in the Kentucky Senate. Located in the western part of the state, it comprises the counties of Daviess, Hancock, and McLean. Within the district is the economic leading city of Owensboro. It has been represented by Gary Boswell (R–Owensboro) since 2023. As of 2023, the district had a population of 121,354.

From 1966 to 1967, the district was represented by Wendell Ford, who would later be elected governor and U.S. senator from Kentucky.

== Voter registration ==
On January 1, 2025, the district had 93,005 registered voters, who were registered with the following parties.

Party	Registration	
Party	Voters	%
Republican	43,274	46.53
Democratic	40,770	43.84
Independent	3,628	3.90
Libertarian	426	0.46
Green	62	0.07
Constitution	44	0.05
Socialist Workers	12	0.01
Reform	7	0.01
"Other"	4,782	5.14
Total	93,005	100.00
Source: Kentucky State Board of Elections

== Election results from statewide races ==
=== 2014 – 2020 ===
Year	Office	Results (Note: Figures presented in this table are calculated by summing precinct election results published by the Kentucky State Board of Elections, using precinct data that list each precinct's senatorial district.)
2014	Senator	McConnell 55.5 - 41.3%
2015	Governor	Bevin 54.8 - 42.7%
2015	Secretary of State	Grimes 51.8 - 48.2%
2015	Attorney General	Beshear 53.0 - 47.0%
2015	Auditor of Public Accounts	Harmon 53.9 - 46.1%
2015	State Treasurer	Ball 57.9 - 42.1%
2015	Commissioner of Agriculture	Quarles 58.7 - 41.3%
2016	President	Trump 64.2 - 30.0%
2016	Senator	Paul 58.8 - 41.2%
2019	Governor	Bevin 50.9 - 46.7%
2019	Secretary of State	Adams 53.7 - 46.3%
2019	Attorney General	Cameron 59.7 - 40.3%
2019	Auditor of Public Accounts	Harmon 56.4 - 40.0%
2019	State Treasurer	Ball 59.8 - 40.2%
2019	Commissioner of Agriculture	Quarles 58.6 - 38.2%
2020	President	Trump 64.4 - 33.6%
2020	Senator	McConnell 58.0 - 36.2%
2020	Amendment 1	Yes 64.8 - 35.2%
2020	Amendment 2	No 66.6 - 33.4%

=== 2022 – present ===
Year	Office	Results
2022	Senator	Paul 65.3 - 34.7%
2022	Amendment 1	Yes 51.4 - 48.6%
2022	Amendment 2	Yes 55.5 - 44.5%
2023	Governor	Beshear 50.2 - 49.8%
2023	Secretary of State	Adams 61.0 - 39.0%
2023	Attorney General	Coleman 60.4 - 39.6%
2023	Auditor of Public Accounts	Ball 60.8 - 39.2%
2023	State Treasurer	Metcalf 58.5 - 41.5%
2023	Commissioner of Agriculture	Shell 62.0 - 38.0%
2024	President	Trump 66.8 - 31.6%
2024	Amendment 1	Yes 63.4 - 36.6%
2024	Amendment 2	No 62.7 - 37.3%

== List of members representing the district ==
Member	Party	Years	Electoral history	District location
Wendell Ford (Owensboro)	Democratic	January 1, 1966 – December 12, 1967	Elected in 1965. Resigned after being elected Lieutenant Governor of Kentucky.	1964–1972
Delbert Murphy (Owensboro)	Democratic	December 1967 – January 1, 1991	Elected to finish Ford's term. Reelected in 1969. Reelected in 1973. Reelected in 1977. Reelected in 1981. Reelected in 1986. Retired.	1964–1972
Delbert Murphy (Owensboro)	Democratic	December 1967 – January 1, 1991	Elected to finish Ford's term. Reelected in 1969. Reelected in 1973. Reelected in 1977. Reelected in 1981. Reelected in 1986. Retired.	1972–1974
Delbert Murphy (Owensboro)	Democratic	December 1967 – January 1, 1991	Elected to finish Ford's term. Reelected in 1969. Reelected in 1973. Reelected in 1977. Reelected in 1981. Reelected in 1986. Retired.	1974–1984
Delbert Murphy (Owensboro)	Democratic	December 1967 – January 1, 1991	Elected to finish Ford's term. Reelected in 1969. Reelected in 1973. Reelected in 1977. Reelected in 1981. Reelected in 1986. Retired.	1984–1993; Daviess, Hancock, and Ohio (part) Counties.
David Boswell (Owensboro)	Democratic	January 1, 1991 – January 1, 2011	Elected in 1990. Reelected in 1994. Reelected in 1998. Reelected in 2002. Reelected in 2006. Lost reelection.	1984–1993; Daviess, Hancock, and Ohio (part) Counties.
David Boswell (Owensboro)	Democratic	January 1, 1991 – January 1, 2011	Elected in 1990. Reelected in 1994. Reelected in 1998. Reelected in 2002. Reelected in 2006. Lost reelection.	1993–1997
David Boswell (Owensboro)	Democratic	January 1, 1991 – January 1, 2011	Elected in 1990. Reelected in 1994. Reelected in 1998. Reelected in 2002. Reelected in 2006. Lost reelection.	1997–2003
David Boswell (Owensboro)	Democratic	January 1, 1991 – January 1, 2011	Elected in 1990. Reelected in 1994. Reelected in 1998. Reelected in 2002. Reelected in 2006. Lost reelection.	2003–2015
Joseph R. Bowen (Owensboro)	Republican	January 1, 2011 – January 1, 2019	Elected in 2010. Reelected in 2014. Retired.	2003–2015
Joseph R. Bowen (Owensboro)	Republican	January 1, 2011 – January 1, 2019	Elected in 2010. Reelected in 2014. Retired.	2015–2023
Matt Castlen (Owensboro)	Republican	January 1, 2019 – January 1, 2023	Elected in 2018. Retired.	2015–2023
Gary Boswell (Owensboro)	Republican	January 1, 2023 – present	Elected in 2022. Reelected in 2026.	2023–present
