= Kentucky's 18th Senate district =

American legislative district

Kentucky's 18th State Senate district
Senator
Robin L. Webb; R–Grayson
since September 1, 2009
- Registration: 51.3% Republican; 38.8% Democratic; 9.4% No party preference
- Demographics: 94.3% White; 1.0% Black; 1.2% Hispanic; 0.4% Asian; 0.1% Native American; 0.1% Other; 2.9% Multiracial
- Population (2023): 123,225
- Registered voters (2025): 100,603

Kentucky's 18th Senatorial district is one of 38 districts in the Kentucky Senate. Located in the eastern part of the state, it comprises the counties of Boyd, Carter, Greenup, and Lewis. It has been represented by Robin L. Webb (R–Grayson) since 2009. As of 2023, the district had a population of 123,225.

== Voter registration ==
On January 1, 2025, the district had 100,603 registered voters, who were registered with the following parties.

Party	Registration	
Party	Voters	%
Republican	51,569	51.26
Democratic	39,037	38.80
Independent	5,378	5.35
Libertarian	446	0.44
Green	50	0.05
Constitution	50	0.05
Socialist Workers	12	0.01
Reform	1	0.00
"Other"	4,060	4.04
Total	100,603	100.00
Source: Kentucky State Board of Elections

== Election results from statewide races ==
=== 2014 – 2020 ===
Year	Office	Results (Note: Figures presented in this table are calculated by summing precinct election results published by the Kentucky State Board of Elections, using precinct data that list each precinct's senatorial district.)
2014	Senator	McConnell 50.8 - 45.6%
2015	Governor	Bevin 54.1 - 43.0%
2015	Secretary of State	Grimes 52.7 - 47.3%
2015	Attorney General	Beshear 52.8 - 47.2%
2015	Auditor of Public Accounts	Harmon 53.1 - 46.9%
2015	State Treasurer	Ball 54.0 - 46.0%
2015	Commissioner of Agriculture	Quarles 55.9 - 44.1%
2016	President	Trump 69.6 - 26.5%
2016	Senator	Paul 54.6 - 45.4%
2019	Governor	Beshear 49.2 - 48.3%
2019	Secretary of State	Adams 53.0 - 47.0%
2019	Attorney General	Cameron 55.6 - 44.4%
2019	Auditor of Public Accounts	Harmon 55.7 - 41.0%
2019	State Treasurer	Ball 58.9 - 41.1%
2019	Commissioner of Agriculture	Quarles 55.3 - 41.3%
2020	President	Trump 70.1 - 28.3%
2020	Senator	McConnell 62.7 - 32.7%
2020	Amendment 1	Yes 63.0 - 37.0%
2020	Amendment 2	No 65.3 - 34.7%

=== 2022 – present ===
Year	Office	Results
2022	Senator	Paul 69.6 - 30.4%
2022	Amendment 1	Yes 50.7 - 49.3%
2022	Amendment 2	Yes 54.6 - 45.4%
2023	Governor	Cameron 53.1 - 46.9%
2023	Secretary of State	Adams 64.1 - 35.9%
2023	Attorney General	Coleman 63.8 - 36.2%
2023	Auditor of Public Accounts	Ball 63.6 - 36.4%
2023	State Treasurer	Metcalf 62.8 - 37.2%
2023	Commissioner of Agriculture	Shell 65.2 - 34.8%
2024	President	Trump 74.5 - 24.2%
2024	Amendment 1	Yes 65.3 - 34.7%
2024	Amendment 2	No 66.4 - 33.6%

== List of members representing the district ==
Member	Party	Years	Electoral history	District location
George M. Plummer (Vanceburg)	Republican	January 1, 1970 – January 17, 1970	Elected in 1969. Died.	1964–1972
Luther K. Plummer (Vanceburg)	Republican	February 19, 1970 – January 1, 1974	Elected to finish his brother's term. Lost reelection.	1964–1972
Luther K. Plummer (Vanceburg)	Republican	February 19, 1970 – January 1, 1974	Elected to finish his brother's term. Lost reelection.	1972–1974
Nelson Allen (Greenup)	Democratic	January 1, 1974 – January 1, 1991	Elected in 1973. Reelected in 1977. Reelected in 1981. Reelected in 1986. Lost reelection.	1974–1984
Nelson Allen (Greenup)	Democratic	January 1, 1974 – January 1, 1991	Elected in 1973. Reelected in 1977. Reelected in 1981. Reelected in 1986. Lost reelection.	1984–1993; Carter, Greenup, Lewis, and Mason Counties.
Charlie Borders (Grayson)	Republican	January 1, 1991 – July 15, 2009	Elected in 1990. Reelected in 1994. Reelected in 1998. Reelected in 2002. Reelected in 2006. Resigned to become a member of the Kentucky Public Service Commission.	1984–1993; Carter, Greenup, Lewis, and Mason Counties.
Charlie Borders (Grayson)	Republican	January 1, 1991 – July 15, 2009	Elected in 1990. Reelected in 1994. Reelected in 1998. Reelected in 2002. Reelected in 2006. Resigned to become a member of the Kentucky Public Service Commission.	1993–1997
Charlie Borders (Grayson)	Republican	January 1, 1991 – July 15, 2009	Elected in 1990. Reelected in 1994. Reelected in 1998. Reelected in 2002. Reelected in 2006. Resigned to become a member of the Kentucky Public Service Commission.	1997–2003
Charlie Borders (Grayson)	Republican	January 1, 1991 – July 15, 2009	Elected in 1990. Reelected in 1994. Reelected in 1998. Reelected in 2002. Reelected in 2006. Resigned to become a member of the Kentucky Public Service Commission.	2003–2015
Robin L. Webb (Grayson)	Democratic	September 1, 2009 – May 30, 2025	Elected to finish Borders's term. Reelected in 2010. Reelected in 2014. Reelected in 2018. Reelected in 2022. Reelected in 2026.	2003–2015
Robin L. Webb (Grayson)	Democratic	September 1, 2009 – May 30, 2025	Elected to finish Borders's term. Reelected in 2010. Reelected in 2014. Reelected in 2018. Reelected in 2022. Reelected in 2026.	2015–2023
Robin L. Webb (Grayson)	Democratic	September 1, 2009 – May 30, 2025	Elected to finish Borders's term. Reelected in 2010. Reelected in 2014. Reelected in 2018. Reelected in 2022. Reelected in 2026.	2023–present
Robin L. Webb (Grayson)	Republican	May 30, 2025 – present	Elected to finish Borders's term. Reelected in 2010. Reelected in 2014. Reelected in 2018. Reelected in 2022. Reelected in 2026.	2023–present
