= Kentucky's 27th Senate district =

American legislative district

Kentucky's 27th State Senate district
Senator
Steve West; R–Paris
since March 23, 2015
- Registration: 48.6% Democratic; 41.7% Republican; 9.2% No party preference
- Demographics: 85.8% White; 6.0% Black; 4.2% Hispanic; 0.8% Asian; 0.1% Native American; 0.1% Other; 3.0% Multiracial
- Population (2023): 125,807
- Registered voters (2025): 94,363

Kentucky's 27th Senatorial district is one of 38 districts in the Kentucky Senate. Located in the central part of the state, it comprises the counties of Bourbon, Fleming, Harrison, Mason, Nicholas, Robertson, Rowan, and part of Fayette. It has been represented by Steve West (R–Paris) since 2015. As of 2023, the district had a population of 125,807.

== Voter registration ==
On January 1, 2025, the district had 94,363 registered voters, who were registered with the following parties.

Party	Registration	
Party	Voters	%
Democratic	45,849	48.59
Republican	39,372	41.72
Independent	4,177	4.43
Libertarian	389	0.41
Green	59	0.06
Constitution	34	0.04
Socialist Workers	16	0.02
Reform	2	0.00
"Other"	4,465	4.73
Total	94,363	100.00
Source: Kentucky State Board of Elections

== Election results from statewide races ==
=== 2014 – 2020 ===
Year	Office	Results (Note: Figures presented in this table are calculated by summing precinct election results published by the Kentucky State Board of Elections, using precinct data that list each precinct's senatorial district.)
2014	Senator	McConnell 54.7 - 41.6%
2015	Governor	Bevin 51.7 - 44.7%
2015	Secretary of State	Grimes 54.9 - 45.1%
2015	Attorney General	Westerfield 50.1 - 49.9%
2015	Auditor of Public Accounts	Edelen 51.3 - 48.7%
2015	State Treasurer	Ball 61.6 - 38.4%
2015	Commissioner of Agriculture	Quarles 61.9 - 38.1%
2016	President	Trump 68.5 - 27.5%
2016	Senator	Paul 55.9 - 44.1%
2019	Governor	Bevin 52.6 - 45.4%
2019	Secretary of State	Adams 52.4 - 47.6%
2019	Attorney General	Cameron 61.1 - 38.9%
2019	Auditor of Public Accounts	Harmon 61.1 - 36.2%
2019	State Treasurer	Ball 64.9 - 35.1%
2019	Commissioner of Agriculture	Quarles 64.7 - 33.2%
2020	President	Trump 70.0 - 28.6%
2020	Senator	McConnell 64.2 - 31.4%
2020	Amendment 1	Yes 61.7 - 38.3%
2020	Amendment 2	No 67.4 - 32.6%

=== 2022 – present ===
Year	Office	Results
2022	Senator	Paul 61.2 - 38.8%
2022	Amendment 1	No 54.8 - 45.2%
2022	Amendment 2	No 56.2 - 43.8%
2023	Governor	Beshear 55.8 - 44.2%
2023	Secretary of State	Adams 59.4 - 40.6%
2023	Attorney General	Coleman 56.5 - 43.5%
2023	Auditor of Public Accounts	Ball 58.7 - 41.3%
2023	State Treasurer	Metcalf 54.9 - 45.1%
2023	Commissioner of Agriculture	Shell 58.9 - 41.1%
2024	President	Trump 64.9 - 33.6%
2024	Amendment 1	Yes 61.0 - 39.0%
2024	Amendment 2	No 68.1 - 31.9%

== List of members representing the district ==
Member	Party	Years	Electoral history	District location
Joe D. Stacy (West Liberty)	Democratic	January 1, 1968 – January 1, 1976	Elected in 1967. Reelected in 1971. Retired.	1964–1972
Joe D. Stacy (West Liberty)	Democratic	January 1, 1968 – January 1, 1976	Elected in 1967. Reelected in 1971. Retired.	1972–1974
Joe D. Stacy (West Liberty)	Democratic	January 1, 1968 – January 1, 1976	Elected in 1967. Reelected in 1971. Retired.	1974–1984
Woodrow Stamper (West Liberty)	Democratic	January 1, 1976 – January 1, 1984	Elected in 1975. Reelected in 1979. Retired.	1974–1984
Woody May (West Liberty)	Democratic	January 1, 1984 – November 25, 1991	Elected in 1983. Reelected in 1988. Resigned due to health issues.	1984–1993; Breathitt, Elliott, Lee, Magoffin, Menifee, Morgan, Owsley, Rowan, and Wolfe Counties.
Walter Blevins (Morehead)	Democratic	January 9, 1992 – January 4, 2015	Elected to finish May's term. Reelected in 1992. Reelected in 1996. Reelected in 2000. Reelected in 2004. Reelected in 2008. Reelected in 2012. Resigned after being elected Judge/Executive of Rowan County.	1984–1993; Breathitt, Elliott, Lee, Magoffin, Menifee, Morgan, Owsley, Rowan, and Wolfe Counties.
Walter Blevins (Morehead)	Democratic	January 9, 1992 – January 4, 2015	Elected to finish May's term. Reelected in 1992. Reelected in 1996. Reelected in 2000. Reelected in 2004. Reelected in 2008. Reelected in 2012. Resigned after being elected Judge/Executive of Rowan County.	1993–1997
Walter Blevins (Morehead)	Democratic	January 9, 1992 – January 4, 2015	Elected to finish May's term. Reelected in 1992. Reelected in 1996. Reelected in 2000. Reelected in 2004. Reelected in 2008. Reelected in 2012. Resigned after being elected Judge/Executive of Rowan County.	1997–2003
Walter Blevins (Morehead)	Democratic	January 9, 1992 – January 4, 2015	Elected to finish May's term. Reelected in 1992. Reelected in 1996. Reelected in 2000. Reelected in 2004. Reelected in 2008. Reelected in 2012. Resigned after being elected Judge/Executive of Rowan County.	2003–2015
Steve West (Paris)	Republican	March 23, 2015 – present	Elected to finish Blevins's term. Reelected in 2016. Reelected in 2020. Reelected in 2024.	2015–2023
Steve West (Paris)	Republican	March 23, 2015 – present	Elected to finish Blevins's term. Reelected in 2016. Reelected in 2020. Reelected in 2024.	2023–present
