= Kentucky's 34th Senate district =

American legislative district

Kentucky's 34th State Senate district
Senator
Jared Carpenter; R–Berea
since January 1, 2011
- Registration: 47.3% Republican; 40.0% Democratic; 11.9% No party preference
- Demographics: 83.5% White; 6.5% Black; 3.6% Hispanic; 1.8% Asian; 0.1% Native American; 0.2% Hawaiian/Pacific Islander; 0.2% Other; 4.1% Multiracial
- Population (2023): 128,718
- Registered voters (2025): 105,236

Kentucky's 34th Senatorial district is one of 38 districts in the Kentucky Senate. It comprises the counties of Madison and part of Fayette. It has been represented by Jared Carpenter (R–Berea) since 2011. As of 2023, the district had a population of 128,718.

== Voter registration ==
On January 1, 2025, the district had 105,236 registered voters, who were registered with the following parties.

Party	Registration	
Party	Voters	%
Republican	49,786	47.31
Democratic	42,090	40.00
Independent	6,509	6.19
Libertarian	661	0.63
Green	97	0.09
Constitution	41	0.04
Socialist Workers	21	0.02
Reform	13	0.01
"Other"	6,018	5.72
Total	105,236	100.00
Source: Kentucky State Board of Elections

== Election results from statewide races ==
=== 2022 – present ===
Year	Office	Results (Note: Figures presented in this table are calculated by summing precinct election results published by the Kentucky State Board of Elections, using precinct data that list each precinct's senatorial district.)
2022	Senator	Paul 57.6 - 42.4%
2022	Amendment 1	No 54.4 - 45.6%
2022	Amendment 2	No 56.6 - 43.4%
2023	Governor	Beshear 56.0 - 43.9%
2023	Secretary of State	Adams 59.9 - 40.0%
2023	Attorney General	Coleman 54.9 - 45.1%
2023	Auditor of Public Accounts	Ball 59.5 - 40.5%
2023	State Treasurer	Metcalf 55.4 - 44.6%
2023	Commissioner of Agriculture	Shell 57.1 - 42.9%
2024	President	Trump 59.4 - 38.6%
2024	Amendment 1	Yes 62.1 - 37.9%
2024	Amendment 2	No 65.1 - 34.9%

== List of members representing the district ==
Member	Party	Years	Electoral history	District location
John Raymond Turner (Jackson)	Democratic	January 1, 1962 – January 1, 1966	Elected in 1961. Redistricted to the 28th district.	1944–1964; Breathitt, Lee, Magoffin, and Morgan Counties.
John Raymond Turner (Jackson)	Democratic	January 1, 1962 – January 1, 1966	Elected in 1961. Redistricted to the 28th district.	1964–1972
Walter Reichert (Louisville)	Republican	January 1, 1966 – January 1, 1974	Elected in 1965. Reelected in 1969. Lost reelection.	1964–1972
Walter Reichert (Louisville)	Republican	January 1, 1966 – January 1, 1974	Elected in 1965. Reelected in 1969. Lost reelection.	1972–1974
Daisy Thaler (Louisville)	Democratic	January 1, 1974 – January 1, 1978	Elected in 1973. Retired to run for Judge/Executive of Jefferson County.	1974–1984
Jon Ackerson (Louisville)	Republican	January 1, 1978 – January 1, 1987	Elected in 1977. Reelected in 1981. Redistricted to the 36th district and ran for the 47th house district.	1974–1984
Jon Ackerson (Louisville)	Republican	January 1, 1978 – January 1, 1987	Elected in 1977. Reelected in 1981. Redistricted to the 36th district and ran for the 47th house district.	1984–1993; Clinton, Knox (part), McCreary, Wayne, and Whitley Counties.
Landon Sexton (Pine Knot)	Republican	January 1, 1987 – February 7, 1994	Elected in 1986. Reelected in 1990. Resigned after being indicted for bribery.	1984–1993; Clinton, Knox (part), McCreary, Wayne, and Whitley Counties.
Landon Sexton (Pine Knot)	Republican	January 1, 1987 – February 7, 1994	Elected in 1986. Reelected in 1990. Resigned after being indicted for bribery.	1993–1997
Barry Metcalf (Richmond)	Republican	March 17, 1994 – January 1, 1999	Elected to finish Sexton's term. Reelected in 1994. Retired to run for the United States Senate.	1993–1997
Barry Metcalf (Richmond)	Republican	March 17, 1994 – January 1, 1999	Elected to finish Sexton's term. Reelected in 1994. Retired to run for the United States Senate.	1997–2003
Ed Worley (Richmond)	Democratic	January 1, 1999 – January 1, 2011	Elected in 1998. Reelected in 2002. Reelected in 2006. Retired.	1997–2003
Ed Worley (Richmond)	Democratic	January 1, 1999 – January 1, 2011	Elected in 1998. Reelected in 2002. Reelected in 2006. Retired.	2003–2015
Jared Carpenter (Berea)	Republican	January 1, 2011 – present	Elected in 2010. Reelected in 2014. Reelected in 2018. Reelected in 2022. Reelected in 2026.	2003–2015
Jared Carpenter (Berea)	Republican	January 1, 2011 – present	Elected in 2010. Reelected in 2014. Reelected in 2018. Reelected in 2022. Reelected in 2026.	2015–2023
Jared Carpenter (Berea)	Republican	January 1, 2011 – present	Elected in 2010. Reelected in 2014. Reelected in 2018. Reelected in 2022. Reelected in 2026.	2023–present
