= Kentucky's 12th Senate district =

American legislative district

Kentucky's 12th State Senate district
Senator
Amanda Mays Bledsoe; R–Lexington
since January 1, 2023
- Registration: 45.9% Republican; 43.1% Democratic; 10.4% No party preference
- Demographics: 84.0% White; 4.6% Black; 5.0% Hispanic; 2.7% Asian; 0.3% Other; 3.3% Multiracial
- Population (2023): 120,961
- Registered voters (2025): 101,812

Kentucky's 12th Senatorial district is one of 38 districts in the Kentucky Senate. Located in the central part of the state, it comprises the counties of Boyle, Mercer, Woodford, and part of Fayette. It has been represented by Amanda Mays Bledsoe (R–Lexington) since 2023. As of 2023, the district had a population of 120,961.

== Voter registration ==
On January 1, 2025, the district had 101,812 registered voters, who were registered with the following parties.

Party	Registration	
Party	Voters	%
Republican	46,689	45.86
Democratic	43,907	43.13
Independent	5,802	5.70
Libertarian	510	0.50
Green	95	0.09
Constitution	28	0.03
Socialist Workers	21	0.02
Reform	9	0.01
"Other"	4,751	4.67
Total	101,812	100.00
Source: Kentucky State Board of Elections

== Election results from statewide races ==
=== 2014 – 2020 ===
Year	Office	Results (Note: Figures presented in this table are calculated by summing precinct election results published by the Kentucky State Board of Elections, using precinct data that list each precinct's senatorial district.)
2014	Senator	McConnell 53.3 - 44.1%
2015	Governor	Conway 48.2 - 46.4%
2015	Secretary of State	Grimes 55.4 - 44.6%
2015	Attorney General	Beshear 52.6 - 47.4%
2015	Auditor of Public Accounts	Edelen 54.8 - 45.2%
2015	State Treasurer	Ball 61.9 - 38.1%
2015	Commissioner of Agriculture	Quarles 59.3 - 40.7%
2016	President	Trump 48.1 - 44.4%
2016	Senator	Gray 54.3 - 45.7%
2019	Governor	Beshear 60.1 - 38.3%
2019	Secretary of State	Henry 56.7 - 43.3%
2019	Attorney General	Stumbo 52.6 - 47.4%
2019	Auditor of Public Accounts	Donahue 48.7 - 47.9%
2019	State Treasurer	Ball 53.5 - 46.5%
2019	Commissioner of Agriculture	Quarles 53.0 - 44.0%
2020	President	No data (Note: Precinct results were not released for Fayette County in 2020.)
2020	Senator	No data
2020	Amendment 1	No data
2020	Amendment 2	No data

=== 2022 – present ===
Year	Office	Results
2022	Senator	Paul 56.5 - 43.4%
2022	Amendment 1	No 59.4 - 40.6%
2022	Amendment 2	No 59.0 - 41.0%
2023	Governor	Beshear 57.5 - 42.5%
2023	Secretary of State	Adams 60.6 - 39.4%
2023	Attorney General	Coleman 54.6 - 45.4%
2023	Auditor of Public Accounts	Ball 60.2 - 39.8%
2023	State Treasurer	Metcalf 54.4 - 45.6%
2023	Commissioner of Agriculture	Shell 56.3 - 43.7%
2024	President	Trump 57.9 - 40.2%
2024	Amendment 1	Yes 60.4 - 39.6%
2024	Amendment 2	No 68.1 - 31.9%

== List of members representing the district ==
Member	Party	Years	Electoral history	District location
C. Gibson Downing (Lexington)	Democratic	January 1, 1966 – January 1, 1974	Elected in 1965. Reelected in 1969. Retired.	1964–1972
C. Gibson Downing (Lexington)	Democratic	January 1, 1966 – January 1, 1974	Elected in 1965. Reelected in 1969. Retired.	1972–1974
Joe Graves (Lexington)	Republican	January 1, 1974 – January 1, 1978	Elected in 1973. Retired to run for mayor of Lexington.	1974–1984
Larry J. Hopkins (Lexington)	Republican	January 1, 1978 – December 8, 1978	Elected in 1977. Resigned after being elected to Kentucky's 6th congressional district.	1974–1984
Jack Trevey (Lexington)	Republican	January 10, 1979 – June 28, 1990	Elected to finish Hopkins's term. Reelected in 1981. Reelected in 1986. Died.	1974–1984
Jack Trevey (Lexington)	Republican	January 10, 1979 – June 28, 1990	Elected to finish Hopkins's term. Reelected in 1981. Reelected in 1986. Died.	1984–1993; Fayette County (part).
Tim Philpot (Lexington)	Republican	January 1, 1991 – January 1, 1999	Elected in 1990. Reelected in 1994. Retired.	1984–1993; Fayette County (part).
Tim Philpot (Lexington)	Republican	January 1, 1991 – January 1, 1999	Elected in 1990. Reelected in 1994. Retired.	1993–1997
Tim Philpot (Lexington)	Republican	January 1, 1991 – January 1, 1999	Elected in 1990. Reelected in 1994. Retired.	1997–2003
Alice Forgy Kerr (Lexington)	Republican	January 1, 1999 – January 1, 2023	Elected in 1998. Reelected in 2002. Reelected in 2006. Reelected in 2010. Reelected in 2014. Reelected in 2018. Retired.	1997–2003
Alice Forgy Kerr (Lexington)	Republican	January 1, 1999 – January 1, 2023	Elected in 1998. Reelected in 2002. Reelected in 2006. Reelected in 2010. Reelected in 2014. Reelected in 2018. Retired.	2003–2015
Alice Forgy Kerr (Lexington)	Republican	January 1, 1999 – January 1, 2023	Elected in 1998. Reelected in 2002. Reelected in 2006. Reelected in 2010. Reelected in 2014. Reelected in 2018. Retired.	2015–2023
Amanda Mays Bledsoe (Lexington)	Republican	January 1, 2023 – present	Elected in 2022. Reelected in 2026.	2023–present
