= 2006 Kentucky Senate election =

- November 7, 2006

19 out of 38 seats in the Kentucky Senate 20 seats needed for a majority
	Majority party	Minority party
Leader	David L. Williams	Ed Worley
Party	Republican	Democratic
Leader since	January 5, 1999	January 6, 2003
Leader's seat	16th – Burkesville	34th – Richmond
Last election	22	15
Seats before	21 (Note: Independent senator Bob Leeper caucused with the Republicans beginning January 2005.)	16 (Note: Democratic Candidate Perry B. Clark won the vacant 37th district in a February 2006 special election.)
Seats won	21	16
Seat change	Steady	Steady
Seats up	12	6
Races won	12	6
- Results: Republican hold Democratic hold Independent hold
Senate President before election
David L. Williams
Republican
Elected Senate President
David L. Williams
Republican

The 2006 Kentucky Senate election was held on November 7, 2006. The Republican and Democratic primary elections were held on May 16. Half of the senate (all even-numbered seats) was up for election. Prior to the election 21 seats were held by Republicans and 16 were held by Democrats, while one was held by Independent senator Bob Leeper, who caucused with the Republicans. Republicans maintained their majority in the chamber, without gaining or losing any seats.

== Predictions ==
Source	Ranking	As of
Governing	Likely R	November 4, 2006

== Closest races ==
Seats where the margin of victory was under 10%:

1. District 2, 0.16%
2. District 18, 5.64%

== Special elections ==
=== District 37 special ===
2006 Kentucky Senate 37th district special election
Party	Candidate	Votes	%
Democratic	Perry B. Clark	6,757	53.8
Republican	Debbie Peden	5,802	46.2
Total votes		12,559	100.0

== District 2 ==
2006 Kentucky Senate 2nd district election
Party	Candidate	Votes	%
Independent	Bob Leeper (incumbent)	15,497	41.08
Democratic	Carroll Hubbard	15,439	40.92
Republican	Neil F. Archer	6,792	18.00
Total votes		37,728	100.0
Independent hold			

== District 4 ==
2006 Kentucky Senate 4th district election
Party	Candidate	Votes	%
Democratic	Dorsey Ridley (incumbent)	24,064	100.0
Total votes		24,064	100.0
Democratic hold			

== District 6 ==
2006 Kentucky Senate 6th district election
Party	Candidate	Votes	%
Democratic	Jerry Rhoads (incumbent)	22,514	69.74
Republican	Dan McGary	9,768	30.26
Total votes		32,282	100.0
Democratic hold			

== District 8 ==
2006 Kentucky Senate 8th district election
Party	Candidate	Votes	%
Democratic	David Boswell (incumbent)	23,616	100.0
Total votes		23,616	100.0
Democratic hold			

== District 10 ==
2006 Kentucky Senate 10th district election
Party	Candidate	Votes	%
Republican	Elizabeth Tori (incumbent)	16,556	57.11
Democratic	Douglas H. Goodman	12,434	42.89
Total votes		28,990	100.0
Republican hold			

== District 12 ==
2006 Kentucky Senate 12th district election
Party	Candidate	Votes	%
Republican	Alice Forgy Kerr (incumbent)	20,545	56.60
Democratic	James E. Keller	15,751	43.40
Total votes		36,296	100.0
Republican hold			

== District 14 ==
2006 Kentucky Senate 14th district election
Party	Candidate	Votes	%
Republican	Dan Kelly (incumbent)	23,112	100.0
Total votes		23,112	100.0
Republican hold			

== District 16 ==
2006 Kentucky Senate 16th district election
Party	Candidate	Votes	%
Republican	David L. Williams (incumbent)	21,578	71.81
Democratic	Dough Shelton	8,472	28.19
Total votes		30,050	100.0
Republican hold			

== District 18 ==
2006 Kentucky Senate 18th district election
Party	Candidate	Votes	%
Republican	Charlie Borders (incumbent)	17,489	52.82
Democratic	Carol Rice Allen	15,619	47.18
Total votes		33,108	100.0
Republican hold			

== District 20 ==
2006 Kentucky Senate 20th district election
Party	Candidate	Votes	%
Republican	Gary Tapp (incumbent)	25,367	100.0
Total votes		25,367	100.0
Republican hold			

== District 22 ==
2006 Kentucky Senate 22nd district election
Party	Candidate	Votes	%
Republican	Tom Buford (incumbent)	25,164	100.0
Total votes		25,164	100.0
Republican hold			

== District 24 ==
2006 Kentucky Senate 24th district election
Party	Candidate	Votes	%
Republican	Katie Kratz Stine (incumbent)	22,877	100.0
Total votes		22,877	100.0
Republican hold			

== District 26 ==
2006 Kentucky Senate 26th district election
Party	Candidate	Votes	%
Republican	Ernie Harris (incumbent)	31,137	100.0
Total votes		31,137	100.0
Republican hold			

== District 28 ==
2006 Kentucky Senate 28th district election
Party	Candidate	Votes	%
Democratic	R. J. Palmer (incumbent)	24,663	100.0
Total votes		24,663	100.0
Democratic hold			

== District 30 ==
2006 Kentucky Senate 30th district election
Party	Candidate	Votes	%
Democratic	Daniel Mongiardo (incumbent)	24,510	100.0
Total votes		24,510	100.0
Democratic hold			

== District 32 ==
2006 Kentucky Senate 32nd district election
Party	Candidate	Votes	%
Republican	Brett Guthrie (incumbent)	21,695	100.0
Total votes		21,695	100.0
Republican hold			

== District 34 ==
2006 Kentucky Senate 34th district election
Party	Candidate	Votes	%
Democratic	Ed Worley (incumbent)	16,567	55.69
Republican	Barry Metcalf	12,263	41.23
Independent	Donald VanWinkle	916	3.08
Total votes		29,746	100.0
Democratic hold			

== District 36 ==
2006 Kentucky Senate 36th district election
Party	Candidate	Votes	%
Republican	Julie Denton (incumbent)	35,028	100.0
Total votes		35,028	100.0
Republican hold			

== District 38 ==
2006 Kentucky Senate 38th district election
Party	Candidate	Votes	%
Republican	Dan Seum (incumbent)	22,452	57.49
Democratic	Robert G. M. Valenza	16,603	42.51
Total votes		39,055	100.0
Republican hold			
