= Walter Reichert =

American politician (1929–2021)

Member of the Kentucky Senate from the 34th district
- In office January 1, 1966 – January 1, 1974
- Preceded by: John Raymond Turner (redistricting)
- Succeeded by: Daisy Thaler

Member of the Kentucky House of Representatives from the 46th district
- In office January 1, 1964 – January 1, 1966
- Preceded by: Howard P. Hunt (redistricting)
- Succeeded by: Melvin T. Riddle

Personal details
- Born: August 8, 1929 Louisville, Kentucky, U.S.
- Died: October 31, 2021 (aged 92) Louisville, Kentucky, U.S.
- Party: Republican
- Spouse: Ella Reichert
- Children: 4

Walter Stewart "Stu" Reichert (August 8, 1929 – October 31, 2021) was an American politician in the state of Kentucky. He served in the Kentucky Senate and in the Kentucky House of Representatives. He was a Republican. On June 15, 1972, Reichert was one of 11 Republican senators that voted against Kentucky's ratification of the Equal Rights Amendment.
