= Landon Sexton =

American politician

Member of the Kentucky Senate from the 34th district
- In office January 1, 1987 – February 7, 1994
- Preceded by: Jon Ackerson (redistricting)
- Succeeded by: Barry Metcalf (redistricting)

Personal details
- Born: December 28, 1941 (age 84)
- Party: Republican

Landon Carter Sexton (born December 28, 1941) is an American politician, and a former Republican member of the Kentucky Senate. He lives in Pine Knot, Kentucky, United States.

On February 16, 1994, Sexton pleaded guilty to accepting a $5,000 cash donation from a Humana lobbyist after the 1990 General Assembly. He was caught taking bribes during a widespread bribery investigation of horseracing by the FBI known as Operation Boptrot. He was sentenced to 15 weekends in jail, 2 months' home detention and two years' probation in 1994.
