= Ed O'Daniel =

American politician

Member of the Kentucky Senate from the 14th district
- In office January 1, 1978 – January 1, 1991
- Preceded by: Randall Donahue
- Succeeded by: Dan Kelly

Personal details
- Born: March 12, 1938 (age 88) Bowling Green, Kentucky, United States
- Party: Democratic

H. Edward O'Daniel (born March 12, 1938) was an American politician in the state of Kentucky. He served in the Kentucky Senate as a Democrat from 1978 to 1990.
