= 2023 Kentucky elections =

A general election was held in the U.S. state of Kentucky on November 7, 2023.

Notably, few Democratic candidates ran for statewide offices. The Lexington Herald-Leader attributed this to Kentucky's strong Republican lean and the fact that Republicans gained seats in the Kentucky General Assembly in 2022. However, Democrats have pointed to recent victories by liberal judges in nonpartisan elections and the defeat of a 2022 ballot measure that would have removed abortion rights from the Kentucky Constitution as signs that they can still win in the state.

== Governor ==
Incumbent governor Andy Beshear ran for re-election. He faced Republican nominee, incumbent attorney general Daniel Cameron. Due to his high favorability ratings, Beshear was considered the favorite in the election; however, polling tightened in the week leading up to the election. Despite this apparent late momentum for Cameron, Beshear went on to comfortably win re-election by five percentage points, improving on his 2019 performance by 4.6 percentage points.

== Secretary of State ==
Incumbent secretary of state Michael Adams ran for re-election. He faced former state representative Charles "Buddy" Wheatley.

Unlike 2019, the race was not close. Adams won re-election by 21.2 percentage points, improving upon his past performance by 16.7 percentage points.

== Attorney General ==
Incumbent attorney general Daniel Cameron ran for governor.

Kentucky State Representative for the 43rd District Pamela Stevenson announced a run to succeed Cameron. She was the only high-profile state-level Democrat (barring Andy Beshear and Jacqueline Coleman) to have announced a run for statewide office.

Russell Coleman, former U.S. Attorney for the Western District of Kentucky was the only Republican candidate to have declared a run, and thus won the Republican primary unopposed.

Coleman would go on to win the election by 16 percentage points. He also narrowly improved on Daniel Cameron’s win in 2019 by 0.5 percentage points.

== Auditor of Public Accounts ==
2023 Kentucky Auditor of Public Accounts election
- November 7, 2023
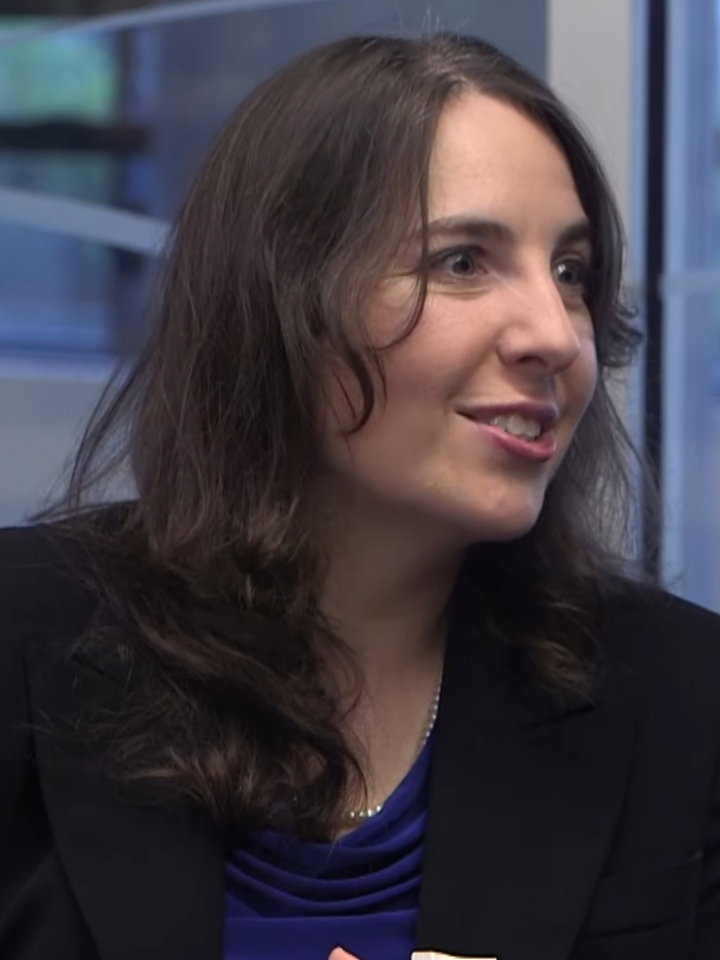
Nominee	Allison Ball	Kim Reeder
Party	Republican	Democratic
Popular vote	783,217	505,924
Percentage	60.8%	39.2%
- Ball: 50–60% 60–70% 70–80% 80–90% Reeder: 50–60% 60–70%
State Auditor before election
Mike Harmon
Republican
Elected State Auditor
Allison Ball
Republican

Incumbent Auditor Mike Harmon was term-limited and could not seek re-election. He ran for governor.

=== Republican primary ===
==== Candidates ====
===== Nominee =====
- Allison Ball, state treasurer

===== Eliminated in primary =====
- Derek Petteys

Republican primary results
Party	Candidate	Votes	%
Republican	Allison Ball	190,685	72.4
Republican	Derek Petteys	72,581	27.6
Total votes		263,266	100

=== Democratic primary ===
==== Candidates ====
===== Nominee =====
- Kim Reeder, tax attorney

===== Endorsements =====
Kim Reeder

Organizations

- Kentucky State AFL-CIO

=== General election ===
2023 Kentucky Auditor election results
Party	Candidate	Votes	%
Republican	Allison Ball	783,217	60.8
Democratic	Kim Reeder	505,924	39.2
Total votes		1,289,141	100

== State Treasurer ==
2023 Kentucky State Treasurer election
- November 7, 2023
Nominee	Mark Metcalf	Michael Bowman
Party	Republican	Democratic
Popular vote	735,522	549,461
Percentage	57.2%	42.8%
- Metcalf: 50–60% 60–70% 70–80% 80–90% Bowman: 50–60% 60–70%
State Treasurer before election
Allison Ball
Republican
Elected State Treasurer
Mark Metcalf
Republican

Incumbent treasurer Allison Ball was term-limited and could not seek re-election. She ran successfully for state auditor.

=== Republican primary ===
==== Candidates ====
===== Nominee =====
- Mark Metcalf, Garrard County Attorney

===== Eliminated in primary =====
- Andrew Cooperrider, businessman
- OJ Oleka, former deputy state treasurer

===== Endorsements =====
OJ Oleka

Statewide officials

- Allison Ball, incumbent treasurer

County results Metcalf: 30–40%; 40–50%; 50–60%; 60–70%; 70–80%; Cooperrider: 40–50%; 50–60%

Congressional district results Metcalf: 40–50%; 50–60%; 60–70%

Republican primary results
Party	Candidate	Votes	%
Republican	Mark Metcalf	135,400	51.2
Republican	Andrew Cooperrider	77,347	29.3
Republican	OJ Oleka	51,582	19.5
Total votes		264,329	100

=== Democratic primary ===
==== Candidates ====
===== Nominee =====
- Michael Bowman, special assistant to Lieutenant Governor Jacqueline Coleman, former bank manager, and nominee for state treasurer in 2019

===== Declined =====
- Neville Blakemore, construction executive and candidate for state treasurer in 2015
- Matthew Lehman, pharmaceutical executive and nominee for Kentucky's 4th congressional district in 2022

===== Endorsements =====
Michael Bowman

Organizations

- Kentucky State AFL-CIO

=== General election ===
2023 Kentucky Treasurer election results
Party	Candidate	Votes	%
Republican	Mark Metcalf	735,522	57.2
Democratic	Michael Bowman	549,461	42.8
Write-in		155	0.0
Total votes		1,285,138	100

== Commissioner of Agriculture ==
2023 Kentucky Commissioner of Agriculture election
- November 7, 2023
Nominee	Jonathan Shell	Sierra Enlow
Party	Republican	Democratic
Popular vote	763,468	522,521
Percentage	59.4%	40.6%
- Shell: 50–60% 60–70% 70–80% 80–90% Enlow: 50–60% 60–70%
State Auditor before election
Ryan Quarles
Republican
Elected State Auditor
Jonathan Shell
Republican

Incumbent Agriculture Commissioner Ryan Quarles ran for governor.

=== Republican primary ===
==== Candidates ====
===== Nominee =====
- Jonathan Shell, former majority leader of the Kentucky House of Representatives

===== Eliminated in primary =====
- Richard Heath, state representative and candidate for agriculture commissioner in 2015

County results Shell: 50–60%; 60–70%; 70–80%; 80–90%; Heath: 50–60%; 60–70%; 70–80%

Congressional district results Shell: 50–60%; 60–70%; Heath: 50–60%

Republican primary results
Party	Candidate	Votes	%
Republican	Jonathan Shell	148,169	56.5
Republican	Richard Heath	114,291	43.5
Total votes		262,460	100

=== Democratic primary ===
==== Candidates ====
===== Nominee =====
- Sierra Enlow, former Louisville Economic Development Manager

===== Eliminated in primary =====
- Mikael Malone

===== Declined =====
- Rocky Adkins, senior advisor to Governor Andy Beshear, former minority leader of the Kentucky House of Representatives, and candidate for governor in 2019

===== Endorsements =====
Sierra Enlow

Organizations

- Kentucky State AFL-CIO

Democratic primary results
Party	Candidate	Votes	%
Democratic	Sierra Enlow	103,243	58.7
Democratic	Mikael Malone	72,560	41.3
Total votes		175,803	100

=== General election ===
==== Polling ====
Poll source	Date(s) administered	Sample size (Note: Key: A – all adults RV – registered voters LV – likely voters V – unclear)	Margin of error	Jonathan Shell (R)	Sierra Enlow (D)	Undecided
Public Opinion Strategies (R) (Note: Poll commissioned by the Republican State Leadership Committee)	July 19–20, 2023	500 (LV)	± 4.4%	45%	27%	27%

2023 Kentucky Agriculture Commissioner election results
Party	Candidate	Votes	%
Republican	Jonathan Shell	763,468	59.4
Democratic	Sierra Enlow	522,521	40.6
Total votes		1,285,989	100

== See also ==
- Elections in Kentucky
- Politics of Kentucky
- Political party strength in Kentucky

== Notes ==
Partisan clients
