= Barry Metcalf (politician) =

American politician

Member of the Kentucky Senate from the 34th district
- In office March 17, 1994 – January 1, 1999
- Preceded by: Landon Sexton (redistricting)
- Succeeded by: Ed Worley

Personal details
- Born: 1959 (age 66–67)
- Party: Republican
- Relatives: Mark Metcalf (brother)

Barry Metcalf (born 1959) is an American politician from Kentucky who was a member of the Kentucky Senate from 1994 to 1999. Metcalf was first elected in a March 1994 special election following the resignation of incumbent senator Landon Sexton. Metcalf ran for the U.S. Senate in 1998, losing the Republican nomination to Jim Bunning. He was succeeded in the state senate by Democrat Ed Worley, who defeated his brother Mark Metcalf.
