= 2019 Kentucky elections =

A general election was held in the U.S. state of Kentucky on November 5, 2019, with all executive offices in the state up for election. Primary elections were held on May 21, 2019.

== Governor and Lieutenant Governor ==
The 2019 Kentucky gubernatorial election took place on November 5, 2019, to elect the governor and lieutenant governor of Kentucky. The Democratic nominee, Kentucky Attorney General Andy Beshear, defeated Republican incumbent Matt Bevin by a margin of just over 5,000 votes, or 0.37%. It was the closest gubernatorial election in Kentucky since 1899 by total votes, and the closest ever by percentage.

Bevin won 97 counties, while Beshear won only 23 counties. Beshear carried only two of the state's six congressional districts, but those districts were the state's two most urbanized, the Louisville-based 3rd and the Lexington-based 6th.

Bevin conceded on November 14, after a recanvass took place that day that did not change the vote count. Libertarian John Hicks also qualified for the ballot and received 2% of the vote. Statewide turnout was just over 42%, much higher than for the 2015 gubernatorial election. The result was a major swing from 2016, when Donald Trump won the state by 30 points and Republicans gained a supermajority in both chambers of the Kentucky General Assembly.

Results

Kentucky gubernatorial election, 2019
Party	Candidate	Votes	%	±%
Democratic	Andy Beshear	709,890	49.20%	+5.37%
Republican	Matt Bevin (incumbent)	704,754	48.83%	−3.68%
Libertarian	John Hicks	28,433	1.97%	N/A
Write-in		46	0.00%	N/A
Total votes		1,443,123	100.0%	N/A
Democratic gain from Republican				

== Secretary of State ==
Incumbent Democratic Secretary of State Alison Lundergan Grimes was ineligible to run for a third term due to term limits. This was the only statewide race in Kentucky in 2019 besides the gubernatorial election in which the Democratic candidate came close to winning and the only non-gubernatorial statewide election in KY, LA or MS where the Democrat achieved more than 45% of the vote in 2019.

=== Democratic primary ===
==== Candidates ====
- Jason Belcher, U.S. Air Force veteran and writer
- Jason Griffith, teacher and businessman
- Heather French Henry, former Commissioner of Veterans Affairs of Kentucky and former Miss America
- Geoff Sebesta, comic book artist

==== Results ====
Democratic primary results
Party	Candidate	Votes	%
Democratic	Heather French Henry	263,419	71.0
Democratic	Jason Belcher	47,923	12.9
Democratic	Jason Griffith	47,655	12.8
Democratic	Geoff Sebesta	12,088	3.3
Total votes		371,085	100.0

=== Republican primary ===
==== Candidates ====
- Michael Adams, general counsel for the Republican Governors Association and former Mitch McConnell aide
- Andrew English, former general counsel for the Kentucky Justice and Public Safety Cabinet and U.S. Navy veteran
- Stephen Knipper, cyber security expert, former Erlanger city councilman, and nominee for secretary of state in 2015
- Carl Nett, former counterintelligence officer

==== Polling ====
Poll source	Date(s) administered	Sample size	Margin of error	Michael Adams	Andrew English	Stephen Knipper	Carl Nett	Undecided
Cygnal	May 10–12, 2019	600	± 4.0%	11%	10%	7%	5%	68%

==== Results ====
Republican primary results
Party	Candidate	Votes	%
Republican	Michael Adams	94,404	41.3
Republican	Andrew English	62,677	27.4
Republican	Stephen Knipper	41,367	18.1
Republican	Carl Nett	30,340	13.3
Total votes		228,788	100.0

=== Polling ===
Poll source	Date(s) administered	Sample size	Margin of error	Heather French Henry (D)	Michael Adams (R)	Undecided
Clarity Campaign Labs (D) (Note: Poll sponsored by Democratic Attorney General Association)	August 12–13, 2019	792	± 3.3%	52%	37%	9%

==== Results ====
Kentucky Secretary of State election, 2019
Party	Candidate	Votes	%
Republican	Michael Adams	746,629	52.3
Democratic	Heather French Henry	682,096	47.7
Total votes		1,428,725	100.0
Republican gain from Democratic			

== Attorney General ==
The 2019 Kentucky Attorney General election was conducted on November 5. Primary elections occurred on May 21, 2019. The general election was held on November 5, 2019. Incumbent Democratic attorney general Andy Beshear declined to seek reelection to a second term to successfully run for Governor. Republican Daniel Cameron defeated Democrat Greg Stumbo. He became the first Republican attorney general of Kentucky since 1948, and the state's first black attorney general.

Results

Kentucky Attorney General election, 2019
Party	Candidate	Votes	%	±%
Republican	Daniel Cameron	823,346	57.75%	+7.86%
Democratic	Greg Stumbo	602,272	42.25%	−7.86%
Total votes		1,425,618	100.0%	
Republican gain from Democratic				

== Auditor of Public Accounts ==
2019 Kentucky Auditor of Public Accounts election
- November 5, 2019
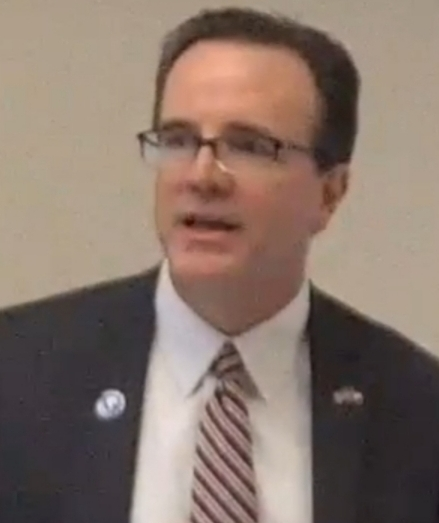

Nominee	Mike Harmon	Sheri Donahue
Party	Republican	Democratic
Popular vote	779,729	574,769
Percentage	55.7%	41.0%
- Harmon: 40–50% 50–60% 60–70% 70–80% 80–90% >90% Donahue: 40–50% 50–60% 60–70% 70–80% 80–90% >90% Tie: 40-50% 50% No data
Auditor before election
Mike Harmon
Republican
Elected Auditor
Mike Harmon
Republican

=== Republican primary ===
==== Candidates ====
- Mike Harmon, incumbent State Auditor of Kentucky

=== Democratic primary ===
==== Candidates ====
- Kelsey Hayes Coots, teacher
- Sheri Donahue, former U.S. Navy engineer
- Chris Tobe, pension consultant

==== Withdrew ====
- Drew Curtis, founder of Fark and independent candidate for governor in 2015

==== Results ====
Democratic primary results
Party	Candidate	Votes	%
Democratic	Sheri Donahue	134,952	46.7
Democratic	Kelsey Hayes Coots	95,685	33.1
Democratic	Chris Tobe	58,548	20.2
Total votes		289,185	100.0

=== General election ===
==== Results ====
Kentucky State Auditor election, 2019
Party	Candidate	Votes	%
Republican	Mike Harmon (incumbent)	779,730	55.7
Democratic	Sheri Donahue	574,820	41.0
Libertarian	Kyle Hugenberg	46,563	3.3
Total votes		1,401,113	100.0
Republican hold			

== State Treasurer ==
2019 Kentucky State Treasurer election
- November 5, 2019
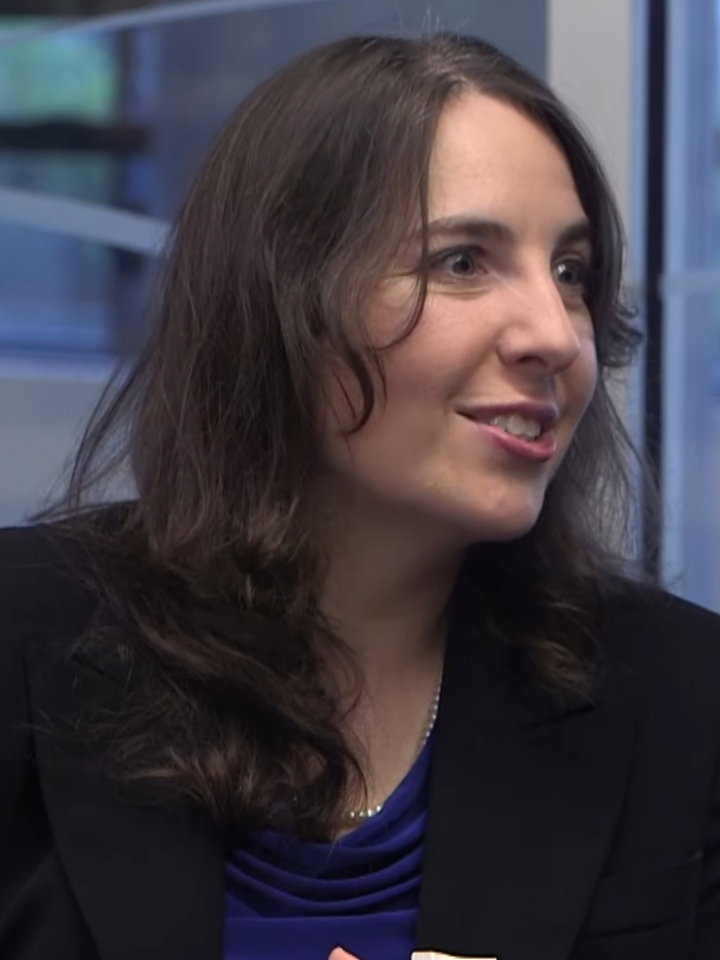

Nominee	Allison Ball	Michael Bowman
Party	Republican	Democratic
Popular vote	856,144	555,209
Percentage	60.7%	39.3%
- Ball: 50–60% 60–70% 70–80% 80–90% >90% Bowman: 50–60% 60–70% 70–80% 80–90% >90% Tie: 50% No data
Treasurer before election
Allison Ball
Republican
Elected Treasurer
Allison Ball
Republican

=== Republican primary ===
==== Candidates ====
- Allison Ball, incumbent State Treasurer of Kentucky

=== Democratic primary ===
==== Candidates ====
- Michael Bowman, bank manager and former Louisville Metro Council staffer
- Josh Mers, insurance agent and treasurer for the Lexington Human Rights Commission

==== Results ====
Democratic primary results
Party	Candidate	Votes	%
Democratic	Michael Bowman	218,174	66.4
Democratic	Josh Mers	110,349	33.6
Total votes		328,523	100.0

=== General election ===
==== Results ====
Kentucky State Treasurer election, 2019
Party	Candidate	Votes	%
Republican	Allison Ball (incumbent)	856,150	60.7
Democratic	Michael Bowman	555,259	39.3
Total votes		1,411,409	100.0
Republican hold			

== Commissioner of Agriculture ==
2019 Kentucky Commissioner of Agriculture election
- November 5, 2019
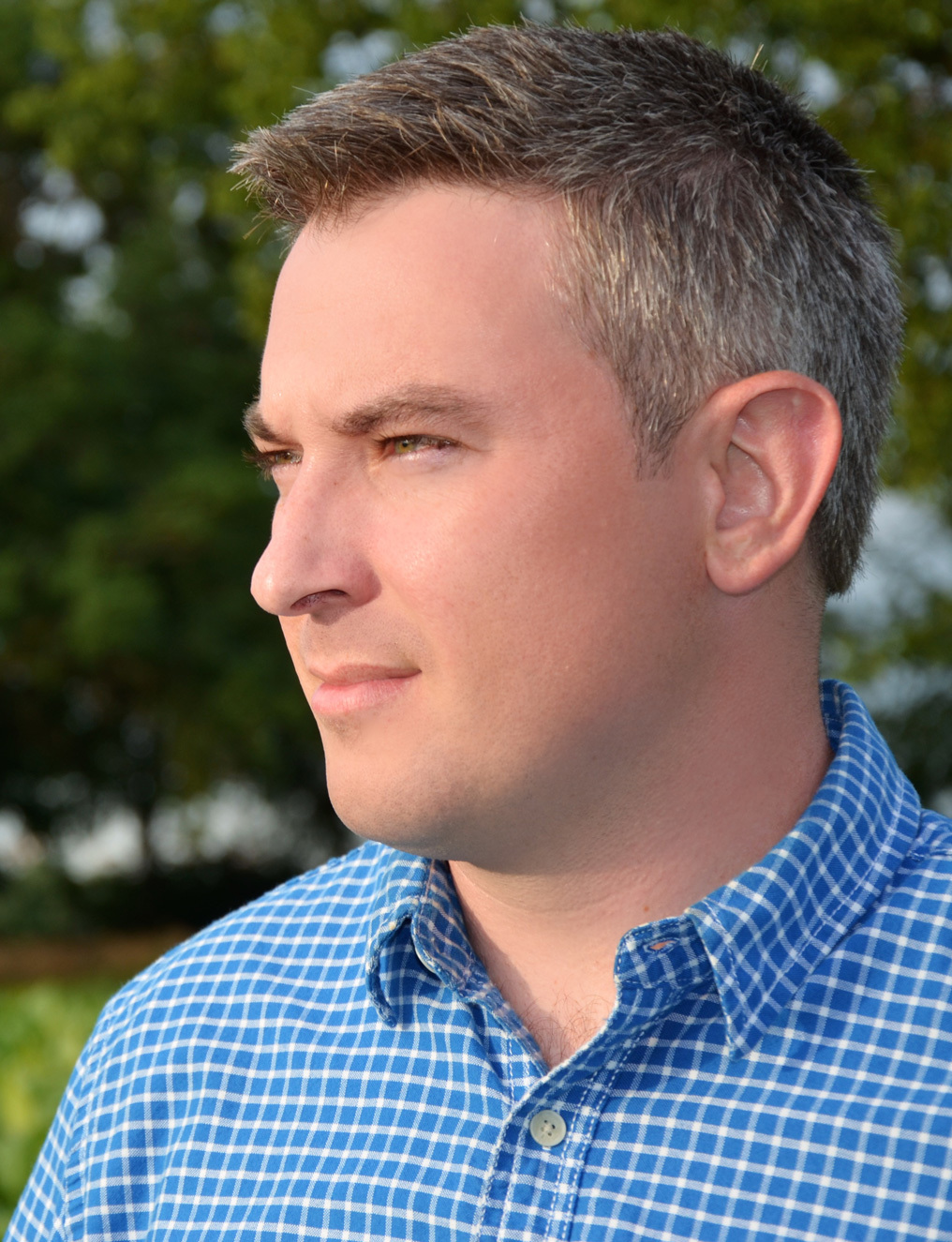

Nominee	Ryan Quarles	Robert Haley Conway
Party	Republican	Democratic
Popular vote	821,369	545,050
Percentage	58.2%	38.6%
- Quarles: 40–50% 50–60% 60–70% 70–80% 80–90% >90% Conway: 40–50% 50–60% 60–70% 70–80% 80–90% >90% Tie: 40-50% 50% No data
Agriculture Commissioner before election
Ryan Quarles
Republican
Elected Agriculture Commissioner
Ryan Quarles
Republican

=== Republican primary ===
==== Candidates ====
- Bill Polyniak, farmer and hemp businessman
- Ryan Quarles, incumbent Agriculture Commissioner of Kentucky

==== Polling ====
Poll source	Date(s) administered	Sample size	Margin of error	Bill Polyniak	Ryan Quarles	Undecided
Cygnal	May 10–12, 2019	600	± 4.0%	8%	35%	58%

==== Results ====
Republican primary results
Party	Candidate	Votes	%
Republican	Ryan Quarles (incumbent)	193,994	82.2
Republican	Bill Polyniak	41,971	17.8
Total votes		235,965	100.0

=== Democratic primary ===
==== Candidates ====
- Robert Haley Conway, district supervisor of the Scott County Soil and Water Conservation Board and former chair of the Scott County Board of Education
- Joe Trigg, Glasgow city councilman

==== Results ====
Democratic primary results
Party	Candidate	Votes	%
Democratic	Robert Haley Conway	202,894	60.2
Democratic	Joe Trigg	134,009	39.8
Total votes		336,903	100.0

=== General election ===
==== Results ====
Kentucky Agriculture Commissioner election, 2019
Party	Candidate	Votes	%
Republican	Ryan Quarles (incumbent)	821,414	58.2
Democratic	Robert Conway	545,099	38.6
Libertarian	Joshua Gilpin	44,596	3.2
Total votes		1,411,409	100.0
Republican hold			

== Judiciary ==
=== Kentucky Supreme Court ===
2019 Kentucky Supreme Court 1st district special election
- November 5, 2019
- District 1

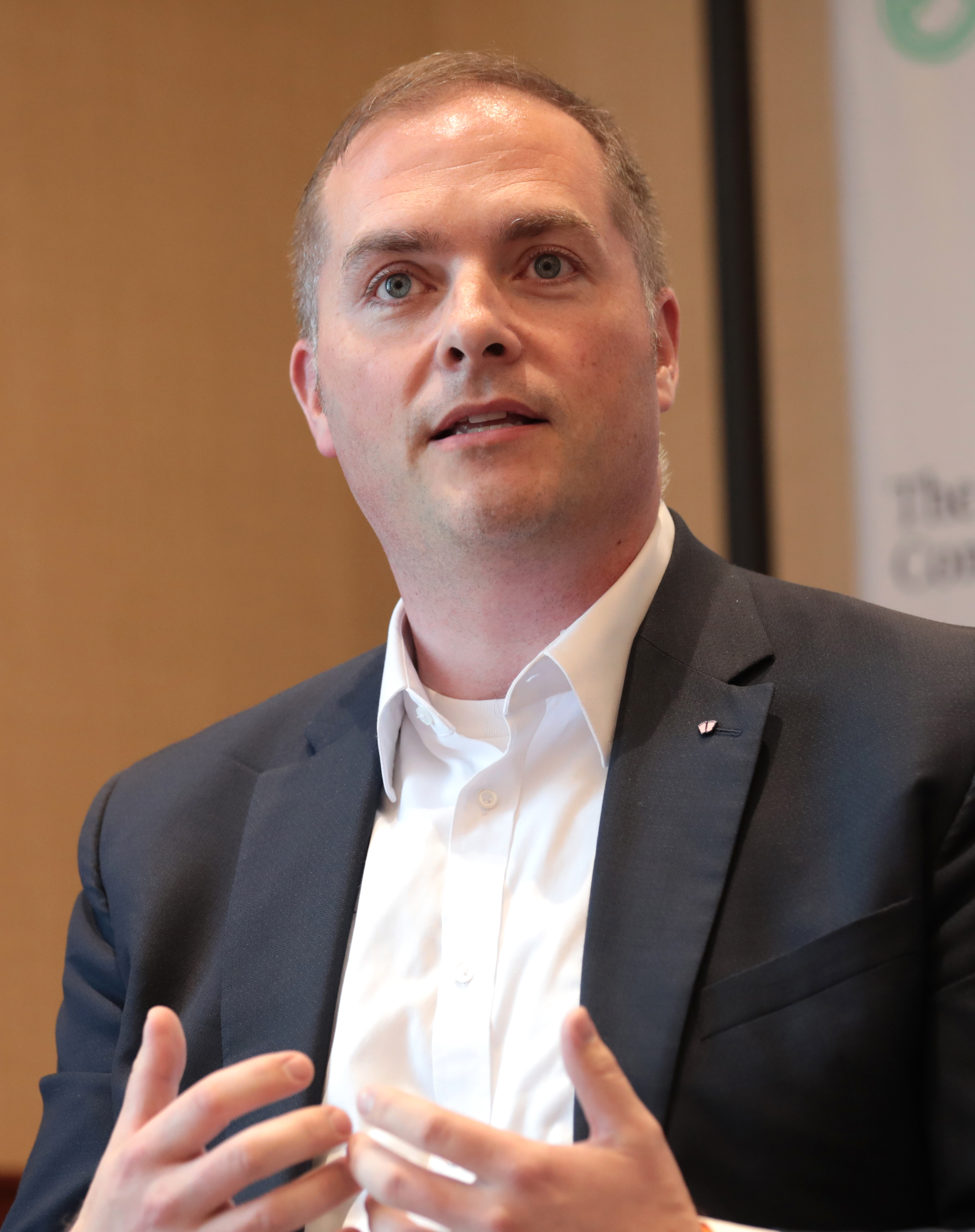
Candidate	Christopher Shea Nickell	Whitney Westerfield
Popular vote	71,991	53,633
Percentage	57.31%	42.69%
- Nickell: 50–60% 60–70% 70–80% 80–90% Westerfield: 50–60% 60–70% 70–80% Tie: 50%
Justice before election
David Buckingham
Elected Justice
Christopher Shea Nickell

==== Candidates ====
- Christopher Shea Nickell, Kentucky Court of Appeals judge for the 1st Appellate District, Division 1
- Whitney Westerfield, member of the Kentucky Senate for the 3rd District and candidate for attorney general in 2015

==== Results ====
2019 Kentucky Supreme Court 1st district special election
Candidate	Votes	%
Christopher Shea Nickell	71,991	57.31
Whitney Westerfield	53,633	42.69
Total votes	125,624	100.0

=== Court of Appeals ===
Kentucky Court of Appeals 3rd Division 1 special election, 2019
Party	Candidate	Votes	%
Nonpartisan	Jacqueline Caldwell	62,851	53.7
Nonpartisan	Michael Caperton	54,098	46.3
Total votes		116,949	100.0

== Notes ==
Partisan clients
