= Ed Worley =

American politician

Minority Leader of the Kentucky Senate
- In office January 6, 2003 – January 1, 2011
- Preceded by: David Karem
- Succeeded by: R. J. Palmer

Member of the Kentucky Senate from the 34th district
- In office January 1, 1999 – January 1, 2011
- Preceded by: Barry Metcalf
- Succeeded by: Jared Carpenter

Personal details
- Born: December 28, 1956 (age 69) Williamson, West Virginia
- Party: Democratic
- Education: Eastern Kentucky University (BS)
- Occupation: General contractor

James Edwin Worley (born December 28, 1956) is a former Democratic member of the Kentucky Senate, representing the 34th District from 1999 to 2011. He was Minority Floor Leader from 2003 to 2011.
