= 1998 United States Senate election in Kentucky =

- November 3, 1998
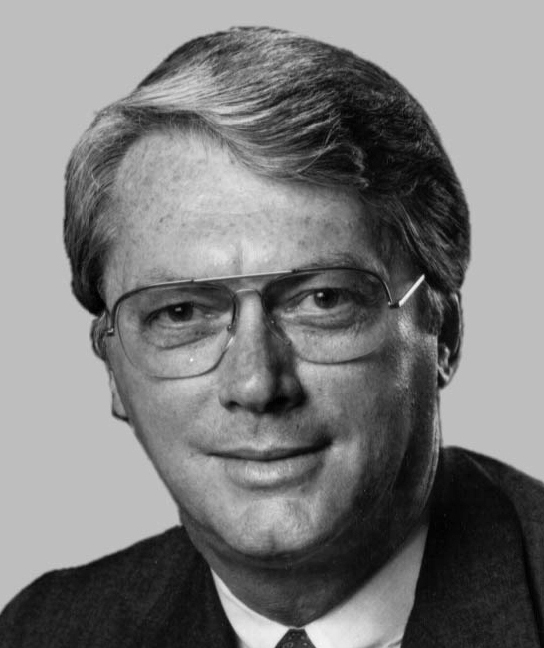

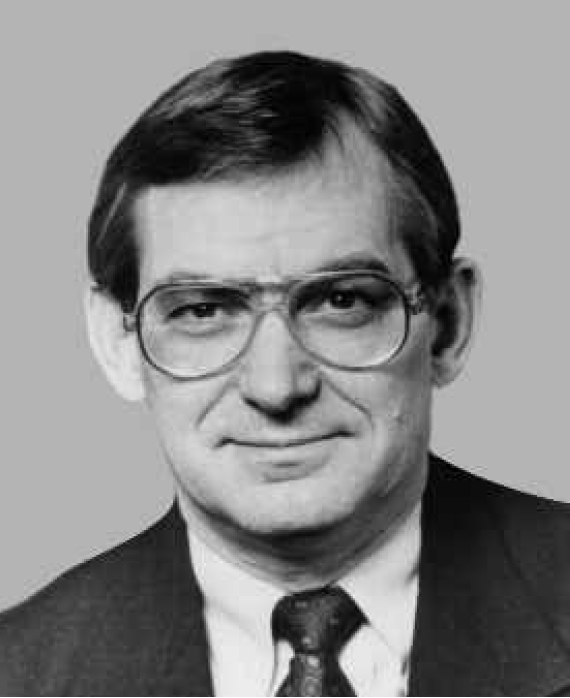
Nominee	Jim Bunning	Scotty Baesler
Party	Republican	Democratic
Popular vote	569,817	563,051
Percentage	49.75%	49.16%
- County results Bunning: 40–50% 50–60% 60–70% 70–80% Baesler: 40–50% 50–60% 60–70% 70–80%
U.S. senator before election
Wendell Ford
Democratic
Elected U.S. Senator
Jim Bunning
Republican

The 1998 United States Senate election in Kentucky was held November 3, 1998. Democratic incumbent Wendell Ford retired rather than seeking a fifth term in office. In the open race, Republican Jim Bunning narrowly defeated Scotty Baesler. This was the first open election for Senate in Kentucky since 1972 and the first open election for this seat since 1968.

With a margin of 0.59 percentage points, this election was the second-closest race of the 1998 Senate elections, behind only the election in Nevada. Bunning's swearing-in marked the first time since 1973 that Republicans held both United States Senate seats from Kentucky.

== Democratic primary ==
=== Candidates ===
- Scotty Baesler, U.S. representative from Lexington
- Jim Brown
- Steve Henry, lieutenant governor of Kentucky
- Charlie Owen, businessman
- Ken Buchanan Thompson
- David L. Williams

=== Results ===
Democratic Primary results
Party	Candidate	Votes	%
Democratic	Scotty Baesler	194,125	34.16%
Democratic	Charlie Owen	166,472	29.29%
Democratic	Steve Henry	156,576	27.55%
Democratic	Jim Brown	19,975	3.51%
Democratic	David L. Williams	16,366	2.88%
Democratic	Ken Buchanan Thompson	14,778	2.60%
Total votes		568,292	100.00%

== Republican primary ==
=== Candidates ===
- Jim Bunning, U.S. representative from Southgate
- Barry Metcalf, state senator from Richmond

=== Results ===
Republican primary results
Party	Candidate	Votes	%
Republican	Jim Bunning	152,493	74.28%
Republican	Barry Metcalf	52,798	25.72%
Total votes		205,291	100.00%

== General election ==
=== Candidates ===
- Charles R. Arbegust (Reform)
- Scotty Baesler, U.S. representative from Lexington (Democratic)
- Jim Bunning, U.S. representative from Southgate (Republican)

=== Polling ===
Poll source	Date(s)	Sample size (Note: Key: A – all adults RV – registered voters LV – likely voters V – unclear)	Margin of error	Scotty Baesler (D)	Jim Bunning (R)	Other / undecided (Note: Calculated by taking the difference of 100% and all other candidates combined.)
SurveyUSA	November 1, 1998	700	—	44%	51%	5%
Mason-Dixon Polling & Strategy	October 26–27, 1998	823 (LV)	± 3.5%	46%	45%	9%
The Courier-Journal	October 20–25, 1998	589 (LV)	± 3.5%	43%	44%	13%
TMR Research (Note: Poll sponsored by the Kentucky Herald-Leader & WKYT)	October 15–21, 1998	800 (RV)	± 3.5%	39%	44%	17%
Mason-Dixon Polling & Strategy	September 28–30, 1998	818 (LV)	± 3.5%	42%	44%	14%
The Courier-Journal	September 25–30, 1998	575 (LV)	± 4.0%	37%	41%	22%
Mason-Dixon Polling & Strategy	August 31 – September 1, 1998	833 (LV)	± 3.5%	42%	41%	17%
Mason-Dixon Polling & Strategy	July 9–11, 1998	811 (LV)	± 3.5%	44%	38%	18%

=== Results ===
General election results
Party	Candidate	Votes	%	±%
Republican	Jim Bunning	569,817	49.75%	+13.94%
Democratic	Scotty Baesler	563,051	49.16%	−13.73%
Reform	Charles R. Arbegust	12,546	1.10%	
Majority		6,766	0.59%	−26.48%
Total votes		1,145,414	100.00%	
Republican gain from Democratic		Swing		

== See also ==
- 1998 United States Senate elections

== Notes ==
Partisan clients
