= Mark Metcalf (politician) =

American politician (born 1958)

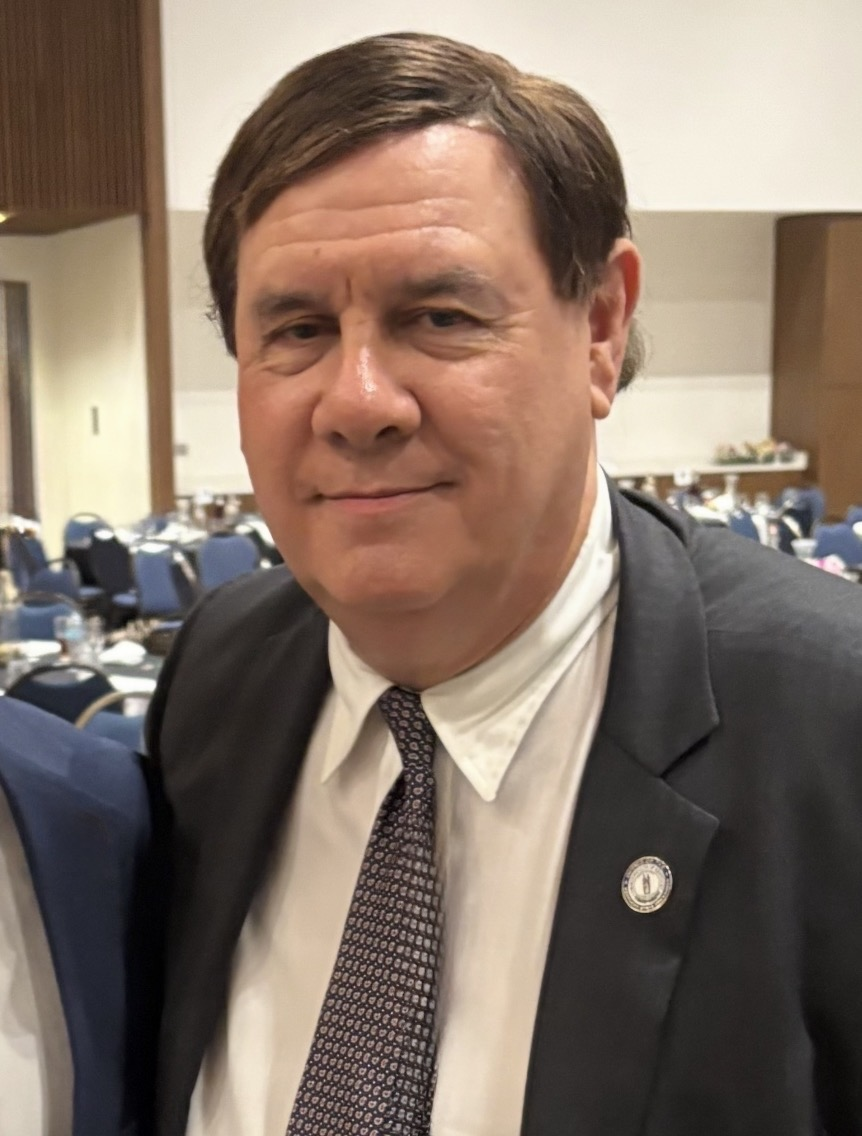
- Metcalf in 2025

42nd Treasurer of Kentucky
- Incumbent
- Assumed office January 1, 2024
- Governor: Andy Beshear
- Preceded by: Allison Ball

Personal details
- Born: September 9, 1958 (age 67)
- Party: Republican
- Relatives: Barry Metcalf (brother)
- Education: University of Kentucky (BA, JD)

Mark H. Metcalf (born September 9, 1958) is an American attorney and politician from Kentucky. A Republican, he is the 42nd Kentucky State Treasurer and the second Republican elected to this post since 1944.

== Early life and career ==
Metcalf was born on September 9, 1958. He graduated from Garrard County High School in Lancaster, Kentucky. He earned a Bachelor of Arts from the University of Kentucky and a Juris Doctor from the University of Kentucky College of Law. As an undergraduate, he was elected president of the Student Government. This position also was a non-voting member of the university's Board of Trustees.

== Political career ==
Metcalf's first job after college was on the campaign staff of Hal Rogers. He then worked as an attorney for a few years.

In 1990, Metcalf was elected county attorney for Garrard County, Kentucky. He served for two terms. He joined the Kentucky Army National Guard in 1992, retiring in 2020. He is a combat veteran of Iraq. Metcalf ran in the 1996 election to represent Kentucky's 6th congressional district in the United States House of Representatives, which was then held by Scotty Baesler, a member of the Democratic Party. He lost the Republican Party's primary election to Ernie Fletcher by four votes. In 1998, Metcalf ran for the Kentucky state senate against Ed Worley, former-City Manager of Richmond, Kentucky. He lost by 2.1 percent.

In 2002, Metcalf joined the George W. Bush administration, working in the U.S. Department of Justice. In 2006, he was appointed a U.S. immigration judge. In 2010, he was elected to his third term as Garrard County Attorney. He was reelected three more times, serving as county attorney for six terms. In 2018, Kentucky Attorney General Andy Beshear appointed Metcalf to serve as special prosecutor to investigate allegations that Alison Lundergan Grimes, the Secretary of State of Kentucky, misused the Kentucky Voter Registration System.

Metcalf ran for Kentucky State Treasurer in the 2023 elections. He won the Republican primary defeating O.C. Oleka and Andrew Cooperrider. He faced Democrat Michael Bowman in the general election and won with 57 percent of the vote.

Political offices
| Preceded by Allison Ball | Treasurer of Kentucky; 2024–present | Incumbent |
