= 2024 Kentucky Amendment 2 =

Amendment 2
- November 5, 2024
- Charter Schools Amendment

Results
Choice	Votes	%
Yes	707,819	35.21%
No	1,302,466	64.79%
Total votes	2,010,285	100.00%

No
70%–80%
60%–70%
50%–60%

2024 Kentucky Amendment 2 was a rejected legislatively referred amendment to the Kentucky Constitution, which was voted on as part of the 2024 Kentucky elections. If enacted, the amendment would have allowed the Kentucky General Assembly to fund charter schools.

== Text ==
To give parents choices in educational opportunities for their children, are you in favor of enabling the General Assembly to provide financial support for the education costs of students in kindergarten through 12th grade who are outside the system of common (public) schools by amending the Constitution of Kentucky as stated below?

IT IS PROPOSED THAT A NEW SECTION BE ADDED TO THE CONSTITUTION OF KENTUCKY TO READ AS FOLLOWS:

The General Assembly may provide financial support for the education of students outside the system of common schools. The General Assembly may exercise this authority by law, Sections 59, 60, 171, 183, 184, 186, and 189 of this Constitution notwithstanding.

== Background ==
In 2021 the General Assembly passed a law awarding tax credits for donations to private schools. The law was struck down by the Kentucky Supreme Court in 2022 for violating provisions of the Constitution of Kentucky forbidding public funding of private education. The General Assembly passed a separate law in 2022 which would have allowed for the public funding of charter schools and the creation of two pilot schools, which was also declared unconstitutional by a Circuit Court judge in December 2023.

== Legislative history ==
Amendments to the Kentucky Constitution require 3/5 support in both houses of the General Assembly and a majority vote by referendum; they can not be vetoed by the governor. The amendment was first introduced on January 26 in the 2024 General Assembly as House Bill 2 by representative Suzanne Miles. The bill passed both houses and was voted on in November 2024. It was one of two constitutional amendments to be approved by both houses during the 2024 legislative session.

=== House vote ===
Map of the vote Republican yea (65) Republican nay (12) Republican abstention (1) Democratic nay (20) Vacant seat (2)

The amendment was approved by the house on March 13 with 65 yeas, 32 nays, and one abstention. Representative Bill Wesley later modified his vote from nay to yea.

House of Representatives vote
Party	Votes for	Votes against	Abstentions
Democratic (20)	–	20	–
Republican (78)	65	12: Adam Bowling; Chris Fugate; Kevin Jackson; William Lawrence; Derek Lewis; Scott Lewis; Michael Meredith; Steve Riley; Killian Timoney; Timmy Truett; Bill Wesley; Nick Wilson	1: Kim Banta
Total (98) (Note: At the time of the vote, the 24th and 26th districts were vacant.)	65	32	1

=== Senate vote ===
Map of the vote (as modified) Republican yea (27) Republican nay (4) Democratic nay (7)

The amendment was approved by the senate on March 15 with 27 yeas, eight nays, and three senators not voting. Senator Johnnie Turner later modified his vote from yea to nay. Brandon Smith and Robin L. Webb, who did not vote, modified their votes to nay. Jared Carpenter, who also did not vote, later modified his vote to yea.

Senate vote
Party	Votes for	Votes against	Not voting
Democratic (7)	–	6	1
Republican (31)	27	2	2
Total (38)	27	8	3

Senate vote (as modified)
Party	Votes for	Votes against
Democratic (7)	–	7
Republican (31)	27	4: Brandon Smith; Brandon J. Storm; Johnnie Turner; Phillip Wheeler
Total (38)	27	11

== Endorsements ==
Yes

U.S. senators

- Rand Paul, Kentucky (2011–present) (Republican)
No

Statewide officials

- Andy Beshear, governor of Kentucky (2019–present) (Democratic)
- Jacqueline Coleman, lieutenant governor of Kentucky (2019–present) (Democratic)

Newspapers

- The Lexington Herald-Leader

Labor unions

- Kentucky Education Association
- United Mine Workers of America

Organizations

- The Fairness Campaign

== Results ==
Amendment 2
Choice	Votes	%
For	707,819	35.21
Against	1,302,466	64.79
Total	2,010,285	100.00

== See also ==
- 2024 Kentucky elections
- 2024 United States ballot measures
- Charter schools in the United States
- History of education in Kentucky
