= Republican Party of Kentucky =

Kentucky affiliate of the Republican Party

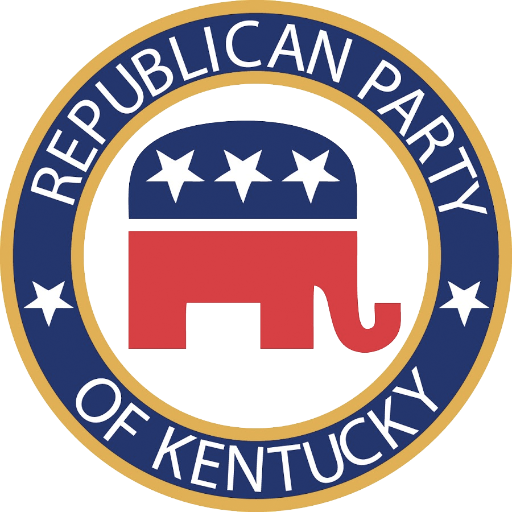
- Chairperson: Robert Benvenuti
- President of the Kentucky Senate: Robert Stivers
- House Speaker: David Osborne
- Headquarters: Frankfort, Kentucky
- Registered voters (August 2026): 1,624,505
- Ideology: Conservatism
- National affiliation: Republican Party
- Colors: Red
- Statewide Executive Offices: 5 / 7
- Seats in the Kentucky Senate: 32 / 38
- Seats in the Kentucky House of Representatives: 80 / 100
- Seats in the United States Senate: 2 / 2
- Seats in the United States House of Representatives: 5 / 6

Election symbol

Website
- rpk.org

The Republican Party of Kentucky is the affiliate of the Republican Party in Kentucky and follows its nationally established platform. The party's headquarters is in Frankfort, Kentucky.

The party gained relevance around the 1940s, though Kentucky was still part of the Solid South at the time. Since this emergence, the party did poorly in state executive office elections until 2015 but saw some success on the federal level and in the Kentucky General Assembly. The party is organized into two main committees that hold authority. In the 2015 Kentucky elections, the party captured the offices of Governor, Lieutenant Governor, Treasurer, and Auditor, gaining the majority of the state executive offices for the first time in modern history. In 2016, Republicans gained control of the state house for the first time since 1920.

It is currently the dominant party in the state, controlling all but one of Kentucky's six U.S. House seats, both U.S. Senate seats, and has supermajorities in both houses of the state legislature. The only two statewide offices that the party does not currently control are the governorship and the lieutenant governorship, which are currently held by Democrats Andy Beshear and Jacqueline Coleman respectively. In 2022, Republicans overtook Democrats in voter registration.

== History ==
=== Emergence and relevancy ===
Cassius Marcellus Clay and John Gregg Fee organized the Republicans in Madison County, Kentucky. Clay was selected as Kentucky's member of the Republican National Committee.

After the times of the Solid South, Kentucky has a unique Republican history. Although it is a traditionally Democratic Southern state, the Republican Party of Kentucky became more relevant in Kentucky political affairs around the 1940s and 1950s. Although candidates in presidential and congressional races began to fare well and see success in elections around this time, it did not translate to much success on the state and local levels. Despite receiving measurable numbers of votes and being competitive in elections, many of the candidates for gubernatorial and legislative races consistently failed to get elected into office.

=== Struggles ===
Despite becoming consistently competitive in state elections, the party's strength in the 1970s and 1980s was comparable to that of the 1930s and 1940s. Between the time of the emergence of the Republican Party of Kentucky and the 1980s, the only Republican governor elected to office was Louie B. Nunn in 1967. This is considered one of the few high points for the party. Problems within the party organization contributed greatly to these struggles. Part of it is due to the turnover at the state party chairman position throughout the 1970s, which hindered any consistency and progress within the party organization. While in the 1980s, however, much of the difficulties for the party came from trying to get good candidates to run for office. For example, in the four state elections held between 1979 and 1987, Republicans only contested 53 out of the 100 State House of Representatives seats and only 11 of the 19 State Senate seats.

== Party organization ==
The Republican Party of Kentucky is organized hierarchically with three levels of authority. The top authority comes from the registered Republicans in Kentucky when the State Convention is in session. However, since the convention is often out of session, there are two lower levels of main authority. The Republican State Central Committee (RSCC) has full control of party operations when State Convention is not in session, while the executive committee within the RSCC controls operations when the RSCC is not in session.

=== Republican State Central Committee ===
The Republican Party of Kentucky's main authority when not assembled in State Convention is the Republican State Central Committee. The RSCC is responsible for a number of activities and operations involving the party on the state and local levels and is required to meet twice per year through established rules. Some of the operations include controlling of funds, creating committees, and promoting campaigns on all levels. The RSCC meets within twenty days of the Republican State Convention to elect a Chairman, Vice Chairman, Secretary, and State Youth Chair. Other officers in turn are appointed by the elected officers. For example, the State Chairman is elected by the RSCC, who in turn appoints a Treasurer.

=== Executive committee ===
While the RSCC is not in session, the responsibilities for party organization are delegated to the executive committee, which consists of 56 members and is required through established rules to meet four times a year. Most of the power in the executive committee resides in six high-ranking members, which are the State Chairman, Vice Chairman, Secretary, Treasurer, National Committeewoman, and National Committeeman.

==== Current officers ====
- Robert J. Benvenuti III, State Chairman
- DeAnna Brangers, Vice Chairman
- Karen Kelly, Secretary
- Cathy Bell, Treasurer
- KC Crosbie, National Committeewoman
- John T. McCarthy III, National Committeeman

== Current elected officials ==
The Kentucky Republican Party controls five of the seven statewide offices and holds supermajorities in both chambers of the Kentucky General Assembly. Republicans also hold both of the state's U.S. Senate seats and five of the six U.S. House seats.

=== Members of U.S. Congress ===
==== U.S. Senate ====
Republicans have controlled both of Kentucky's seats in the U.S. Senate since 1998:

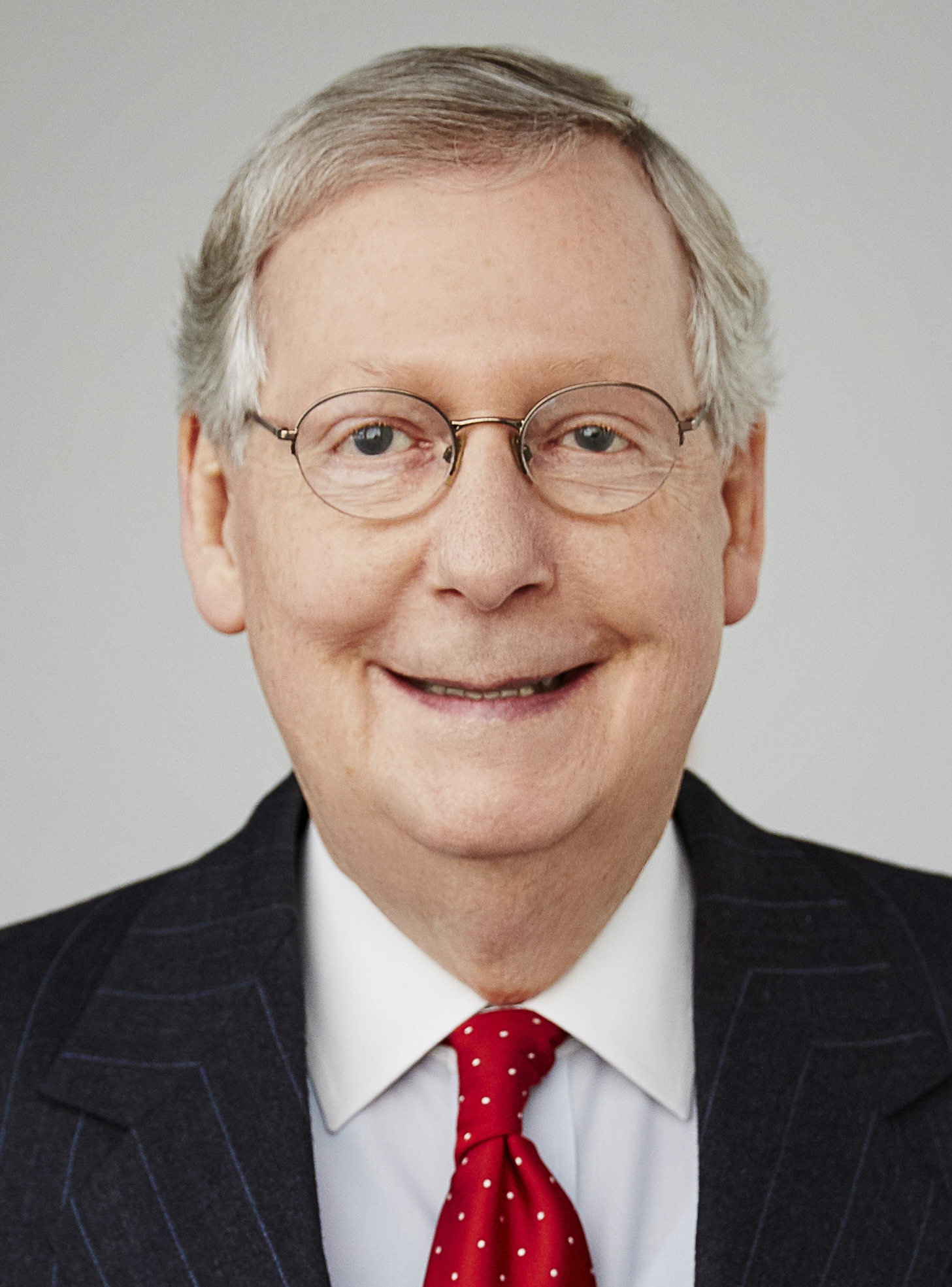
Senior U.S. Senator Mitch McConnell

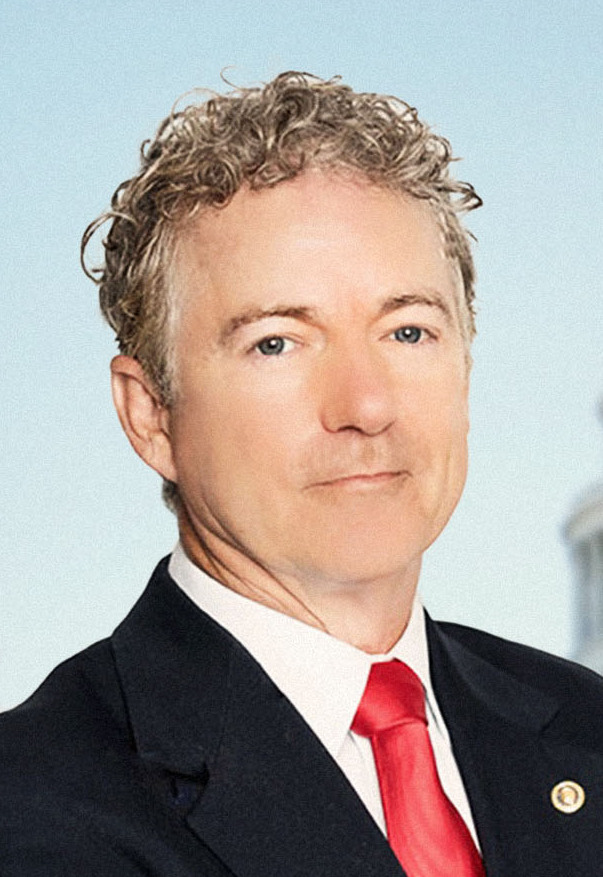
Junior (Pre-senior) U.S. Senator Rand Paul

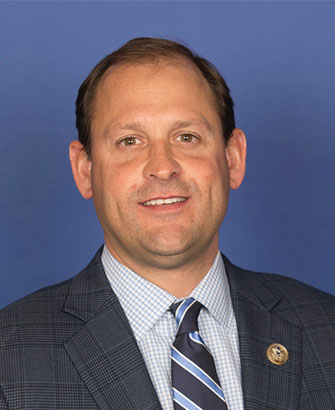
Junior U.S. Senator-elect Andy Barr

==== U.S. House of Representatives ====
Out of the 6 seats Kentucky is apportioned in the U.S. House of Representatives, 5 are held by Republicans:

District	Member	Photo
1st	James Comer	
2nd	Brett Guthrie	
4th	Thomas Massie	
4th	Ed Gallrein (elect)	
5th	Hal Rogers	
6th	Andy Barr	

=== Statewide office ===
Republicans control five of the seven elected statewide offices:

Office	Name	Image
Attorney General	Russell Coleman	
Secretary of State	Michael Adams	
State Treasurer	Mark Metcalf	
Auditor of Public Accounts	Allison Ball	
Commissioner of Agriculture	Jonathan Shell	

=== Kentucky General Assembly ===
The Republican Party of Kentucky has held a supermajority in both chambers of the Kentucky General Assembly since 2017. They currently hold 32 of the 38 seats in the Kentucky Senate as well as 80 out of 100 seats in the Kentucky House of Representatives.

==== Kentucky Senate ====
Republicans have maintained a majority in the Kentucky Senate since 1999, and a supermajority since 2013.

Position	Republican Senate Leaders	Image
Senate President	Robert Stivers	
President Pro Tempore	David P. Givens	
Majority Floor Leader	Max Wise	
Majority Caucus Chairman	Robby Mills	
Majority Whip	Mike Wilson	

==== Kentucky House ====
Republicans have maintained both a majority and supermajority in the Kentucky House since 2017. It was the last legislative chamber in the American south with a Democratic majority.

Position	Republican House leaders	Image
House Speaker	David W. Osborne	
Speaker Pro Tempore	David Meade	
Majority Floor Leader	Steven Rudy	
Majority Caucus Chair	Suzanne Miles	
Majority Whip	Josh Bray	

== Electoral history ==
=== Gubernatorial ===
Kentucky Republican Party gubernatorial election results
Election	Image	Gubernatorial candidate	Votes	Vote %	Map	Result
1867		Sidney M. Barnes	33,939	24.72%		Lost ✗
1868 (special)		H. Tarvin Baker	25,734	18.36%		Lost ✗
1871		John Marshall Harlan	89,298	41.39%		Lost ✗
1875		John Marshall Harlan	90,795	41.69%		Lost ✗
1879		Walter Evans	81,881	36.19%		Lost ✗
1883		Thomas Z. Morrow	89,181	40.03%		Lost ✗
1887		William O'Connell Bradley	126,473	44.76%		Lost ✗
1891		Andrew T. Wood	116,087	40.14%		Lost ✗
1895		William O'Connell Bradley	172,436	48.29%		Won ✓
1899		William S. Taylor	193,714	48.07%		Won ✓
1900 (special)		John W. Yerkes	229,363	49.09%		Lost ✗
1903		Morris B. Belknap	202,862	46.17%		Lost ✗
1907		Augustus E. Willson	214,478	51.17%		Won ✓
1911		Edward C. O'Rear	195,672	44.92%		Lost ✗
1915		Edwin P. Morrow	219,520	48.96%		Lost ✗
1919		Edwin P. Morrow	254,472	53.82%		Won ✓
1923		Charles I. Dawson	306,277	45.81%		Lost ✗
1927		Flem D. Sampson	399,698	52.09%		Won ✓
1931		William B. Harrison	366,982	45.43%		Lost ✗
1935		King Swope	461,104	45.14%		Lost ✗
1939		King Swope	354,704	43.49%		Lost ✗
1943		Simeon Willis	279,144	50.49%		Won ✓
1947		Eldon S. Dummit	287,756	42.48%		Lost ✗
1951		Eugene Siler	288,014	45.40%		Lost ✗
1955		Edwin R. Denney	322,671	41.45%		Lost ✗
1959		John M. Robsion Jr.	336,456	39.44%		Lost ✗
1963		Louie Nunn	436,496	49.26%		Lost ✗
1967		Louie Nunn	453,323	51.20%		Won ✓
1971		Tom Emberton	412,653	44.35%		Lost ✗
1975		Bob Gable	277,998	37.16%		Lost ✗
1979		Louie Nunn	381,278	40.59%		Lost ✗
1983		Jim Bunning	454,650	44.11%		Lost ✗
1987		John Harper	273,141	34.91%		Lost ✗
1991		Larry J. Hopkins	294,452	35.27%		Lost ✗
1995		Larry Forgy	479,227	48.71%		Lost ✗
1999		Peppy Martin	128,788	22.20%		Lost ✗
2003		Ernie Fletcher	596,284	55.04%		Won ✓
2007		Ernie Fletcher	435,773	41.29%		Lost ✗
2011		David L. Williams	294,034	35.29%		Lost ✗
2015		Matt Bevin	511,374	52.52%		Won ✓
2019		Matt Bevin	704,754	48.84%		Lost ✗
2023		Daniel Cameron	627,457	47.46%		Lost ✗

== Works cited ==
- Abbott, Richard (1986). The Republican Party and the South, 1855-1877: The First Southern Strategy. University of North Carolina Press. ISBN 0807816809.
