= Ryan Quarles =

American politician

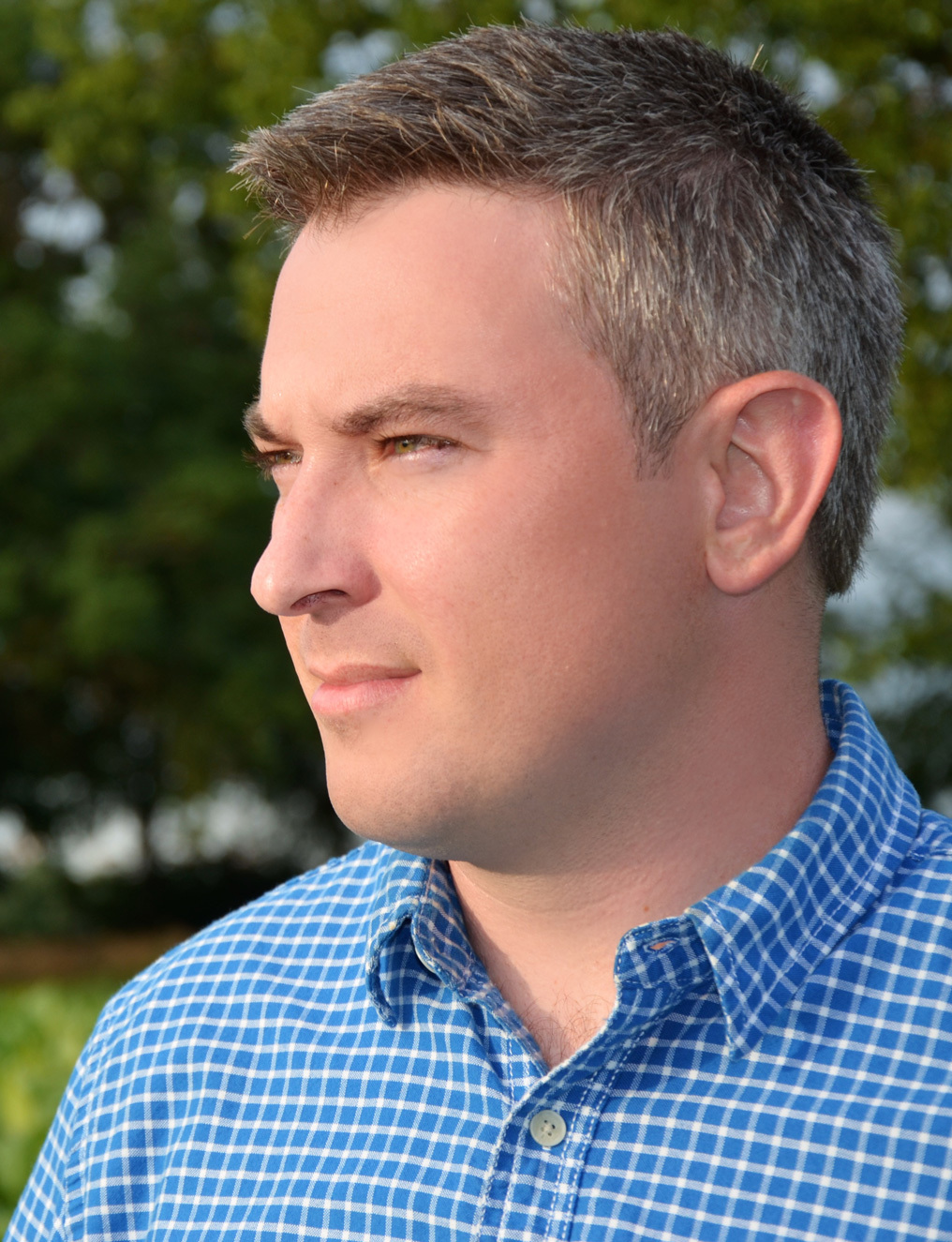
- Quarles in 2015

4th President of the Kentucky Community and Technical College System
- Incumbent
- Assumed office January 2, 2024
- Preceded by: Paul Czarapata

35th Kentucky Commissioner of Agriculture
- In office January 4, 2016 – January 1, 2024
- Governor: Matt Bevin; Andy Beshear
- Preceded by: James Comer
- Succeeded by: Jonathan Shell

Member of the Kentucky House of Representatives from the 62nd district
- In office January 1, 2011 – January 3, 2016
- Preceded by: Charlie Hoffman
- Succeeded by: Chuck Tackett

Personal details
- Born: Ryan Francis Quarles; October 20, 1983 (age 42) Georgetown, Kentucky, U.S.
- Party: Republican
- Education: University of Kentucky (BA, MS, MA, JD); Harvard University (MEd), Vanderbilt University (EdD)

Ryan Francis Quarles (born October 20, 1983) is an academic administrator and American politician who was the Agriculture Commissioner of Kentucky from 2016 to 2024 and a member of the Kentucky House of Representatives from 2011 to 2016. He has served as president of the Kentucky Community and Technical College System since 2024.

== Early life and education ==
Quarles is a native of Georgetown, Kentucky. He attended Scott County High School and was the valedictorian of the class of 2002. While working on the Quarles family farm, he was an undergraduate triple major (Agriculture Economics, Public Service And Leadership, and Political Science, B.S., '05) and earned two masters in Agricultural Economics and in Diplomacy And International Relations ('06) from the nearby University of Kentucky. He graduated summa cum laude with honors. Quarles received a Truman Scholarship, Udall Scholarship, and a scholarship from Toyota. As a Zuckerman Fellow, he was awarded a full-ride scholarship to Harvard University (M.Ed., '09). He also attended the University of Kentucky College of Law (J.D., '10).

Republican Kentucky Governor Ernie Fletcher appointed Quarles to two consecutive terms as a Student Council Member on the Kentucky Council on Postsecondary Education.

== Political career ==
=== Kentucky House of Representatives ===
==== 2010 election ====
Quarles ran, in 2010, for the Kentucky House of Representatives for the 62nd District. He won a Republican primary, with 60% of the vote.

On October 2, 2010, Quarles was arrested in Lexington, Kentucky, for reckless driving. "A police report said Ryan Quarles, 26, was arrested ... about 3:10 a.m. Saturday. Quarles was driving through a parking lot, weaving through cars, the uniform citation said. The report said Quarles showed signs of intoxication, and he had a blood alcohol level of 0.067, when given a breath test. His blood alcohol level was below the legal limit of 0.08." Quarles pleaded guilty in Fayette District Court, and paid a fine, after the charge was lowered to careless driving.

In November 2010, Quarles received 8,508 votes (51%) to incumbent state representative Charlie Hoffman's 8,287 (49%), winning by 521 votes. In 2011, he was appointed to the House Committees on Agriculture & Small Business, Banking & Insurance, and Education.

==== 2012 and 2014 elections ====
Quarles ran for a second term, in 2012. He, again, defeated Hoffman, 54% to 46%.

Quarles ran for a third term, in 2014. He ran in a district redrawn by the Democratic-controlled House to be more Democratic, drawing in territory which had previously not been part of the district. He was made a top target of the Democrats, and his opponent, Chuck Tackett, was a Scott County Magistrate. He won by his largest margin of victory, 59% to 41%.

== 2015 election ==
Quarles ran for Kentucky Commissioner of Agriculture in 2015. He won the Republican nomination against fellow State Representative Richard Heath, in a very close election, with 92,700 votes (50.39%), versus 91,273 votes (49.61%) for Heath. He had been endorsed by the incumbent Commissioner of Agriculture, James Comer, and he defeated Jean-Marie Lawson Spann, in the general election.

=== 2019 election and term ===
Quarles ran for a second term, in 2019. He won the Republican primary, with 82% of the vote (and was the only Kentucky candidate with a primary challenger to win all of Kentucky's 120 counties), and he won the general election, with 58% of the vote.

In February 2022, he lost the case of Kentucky Hemp Association vs. Quarles, with Kentucky's Boone Circuit Court declaring Delta-8 to be a legal derivative of hemp and issuing an injunction against Quarles and Kentucky law enforcement, preventing them from taking any action against people for selling Delta-8. The lawsuit against Quarles was prompted by the Agriculture Commission having issued an advisory opinion that Delta-8 hemp products were not exempted from the federal controlled substances list, which was followed by Kentucky State Police raiding several lawful hemp retail stores in Kentucky and taking a wide variety of hemp products, money, and cameras, and charging store employees with marijuana trafficking.

In June 2022, the Kentucky Attorney General's Office, led by Daniel Cameron, concluded that the Kentucky Department of Agriculture violated Kentucky's open records law, by failing to respond to a request for records related to any litigation involving Quarles or involving the agriculture department, during his tenure, that had been made by the Kentucky Democratic party.

=== 2023 gubernatorial campaign ===
In April 2022, Quarles began a run for the Republican 2023 nomination for Governor of Kentucky. In the primary, he ran against a number of Kentucky Republicans, including former U.S. Ambassador to the United Nations Kelly Craft, state Attorney General Daniel Cameron, and state auditor Mike Harmon. Quarles officially filed his candidacy on January 4, 2023.

Quarles campaigned aggressively in rural areas of the state and earned 235 endorsements from local officials. He lost the Republican primary to Kentucky Attorney General Daniel Cameron, coming in second place, with 21 percent of the vote. Despite the loss, he managed to place ahead of Kelly Craft, a former Ambassador to the United Nations, who had raised $8.5 million and was endorsed by prominent elected officials such as Ron DeSantis and Mike Pompeo.

== Electoral history ==
Kentucky House of Representatives 62nd District Republican primary election, 2010
Party	Candidate	Votes	%
Republican	Ryan Quarles	2,081	59.99
Republican	Ricky Hostetler	1,388	40.01

Kentucky House of Representatives 62nd District Election, 2010
Party	Candidate	Votes	%
Republican	Ryan Quarles	8,508	50.66
Democratic	Charlie Hoffman	8,287	49.34

Kentucky House of Representatives 62nd District Election, 2012
Party	Candidate	Votes	%
Republican	Ryan Quarles (inc.)	12,408	54.03
Democratic	Charlie Hoffman	10,557	45.97

Kentucky Agriculture Commissioner Republican primary election, 2015
Party	Candidate	Votes	%
Republican	Ryan Quarles	92,700	50.39
Republican	Richard Heath	91,271	49.61

Kentucky Agriculture Commissioner Election, 2015
Party	Candidate	Votes	%
Republican	Ryan Quarles	563,013	60.08
Democratic	Jean-Marie Lawson Spann	374,077	39.92

Kentucky Agriculture Commissioner Republican primary election, 2019
Party	Candidate	Votes	%
Republican	Ryan Quarles	193,994	82.21
Republican	Bill Polyniak	41,971	17.79

Kentucky Agriculture Commissioner Election, 2019
Party	Candidate	Votes	%
Republican	Ryan Quarles	821,414	58.2
Democratic	Robert Haley Conway	545,099	38.6
Libertarian	Joshua Gilpin	44,596	3.2

== Higher education career ==
Quarles' interest in higher education developed during a three-year stint as the student representative to the Kentucky Council on Postsecondary Education.

In September 2023, he was named president of the Kentucky Community and Technical College System (KCTCS) Board of Regents.

Accomplishments during his first 100 days in office:

- Conducted a statewide "Focus on the Future" tour to visit each of the 16 colleges. He met with faculty, staff, and students, as well as visiting a wide variety of career-focused programs that colleges offer.
- Secured additional funding during the 2024 legislative session, including an increase in overall budget and additional Work Ready Kentucky Scholarship opportunities. In addition, KCTCS worked with lawmakers to recognize National Mental Health Day in Higher Education.
- Released an independent report that determined KCTCS added $3.9 billion in annual income to the economy during fiscal year 2022–2023, equal to 1.6% of the state's gross state product.
- Established a FASFA Rapid Response Task Force to address delays with the national rollout. As of June 2024, 85% of eligible KCTCS students had completed the FASFA and had received confirmation of accepted applications from the U.S. Department of Education.

In June 2024, Quarles outlined his vision for learner success, employment success, and organizational success, along with 20 goals to achieve in the next 12 months.

Party political offices
Preceded by James Comer	Republican nominee for Agriculture Commissioner of Kentucky; 2015, 2019	Succeeded by Jonathan Shell
Political offices
Preceded by James Comer	Agriculture Commissioner of Kentucky; 2016–2024	Succeeded by Jonathan Shell
