= Michael Adams (Kentucky politician) =

American politician (born 1976)

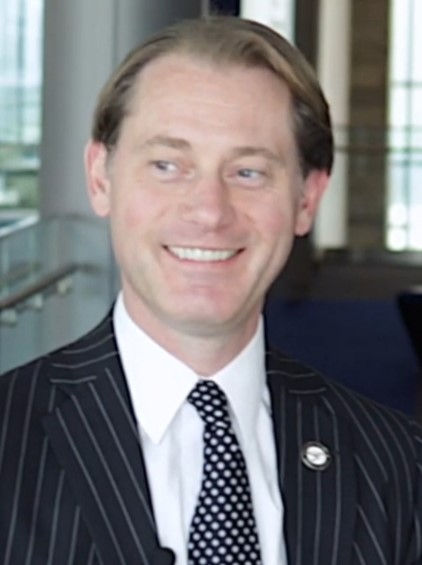
- Adams in 2021

86th Secretary of State of Kentucky
- Incumbent
- Assumed office January 6, 2020
- Governor: Andy Beshear
- Preceded by: Alison Lundergan Grimes

Personal details
- Born: Michael Gene Adams; March 27, 1976 (age 50) Paducah, Kentucky, U.S.
- Party: Republican
- Education: University of Louisville (BA); Harvard University (JD)
- Awards: Profile in Courage Award (2024)

Michael Gene Adams (born March 27, 1976) is an American politician and attorney who is a member of the Republican Party. He is the secretary of state of the Commonwealth of Kentucky. He succeeded Alison Lundergan Grimes on January 6, 2020.

== Early life and career ==
Adams is from Paducah, Kentucky. He graduated from Reidland High School, the University of Louisville, and Harvard Law School. Adams was the first in his family to get a bachelor's degree and attended Harvard Law School on low-income aid. After law school, Adams served as a judicial law clerk for Chief Judge John G. Heyburn II, of the U.S. District Court for the Western District of Kentucky. He worked for Mitch McConnell and Ernie Fletcher before becoming counsel to the deputy attorney general of the United States during the second term of President George W. Bush. After the Bush administration, Adams served as general counsel to the Republican Governors Association, before working in election law. He served as Mike Pence's political law attorney. Adams served as the campaign attorney for Eric Greitens.

== Kentucky Secretary of State ==
=== Electoral history ===
==== 2019 election ====
In the 2019 elections, Adams ran for Secretary of State of Kentucky as a Republican. He defeated former Kentucky Second Lady Heather French Henry in the general election on November 5.

==== 2023 election ====
Adams announced his re-election bid on August 5, 2022. He faced challengers Stephen Knipper and Allen Maricle in the primary election on May 16, 2023. He defeated both with 63.9% of the vote. He defeated Democratic challenger Buddy Wheatley in the general election on November 7, 2023.

=== Election results ===
2019 Kentucky Secretary of State election
Party	Candidate	Votes	%
Republican	Michael Adams	746,629	52.3
Democratic	Heather French Henry	682,096	47.7
Total votes		1,428,725	100.0
Republican gain from Democratic			

2023 Kentucky Secretary of State election
Party	Candidate	Votes	%
Republican	Michael Adams (incumbent)	787,198	60.6
Democratic	Buddy Wheatley	510,743	39.3
Total votes		1,297,941	100.0
Republican hold			

=== Tenure ===
Adams' highest legislative priority in his campaign was changing state law to require photo identification of voters. On April 14, 2020, in the midst of the COVID-19 pandemic, the Kentucky General Assembly passed a Voter ID law over Democratic Governor Andy Beshear's veto.

During the 2020 General Election, Adams implemented expanded procedures giving voters in Kentucky options to safely cast votes during the COVID-19 pandemic which included excuse-free absentee voting and three weeks of open polls. Adams' plan for the 2020 elections resulted in record voter turnout in Kentucky and received praise as a national model for how to conduct elections during a health pandemic. In the 2021 legislative session, Adams led an effort to make several of the election reforms permanent. The legislation garnered bipartisan support, and Governor Beshear signed it into law on April 7, 2021.

The election reform measure includes 3 days of early in-person voting, transitions the state toward universal paper ballots, keeps the online portal for requesting absentee ballots, and allows counties to establish vote centers.

In 2024, Adams received the John F. Kennedy Profile in Courage Award for his work.

In 2026, Adams signed Kentucky House Bill 1, which Governor Andy Beshear had vetoed. This bill enacted a school choice policy which uses federal tax credits for private scholarship donations starting in 2027.

Despite being widely speculated as a candidate for governor, Adams announced at the annual Fancy Farm Picnic in August 2026 that he will not seek the Republican nomination in 2027, and instead endorsed Congressman James Comer.

Party political offices
Preceded by Steve Knipper	Republican nominee for Secretary of State of Kentucky; 2019, 2023	Most recent
Political offices
Preceded by Alison Lundergan Grimes	Secretary of State of Kentucky; 2020–present	Incumbent
