= Jonathan Shell =

American politician

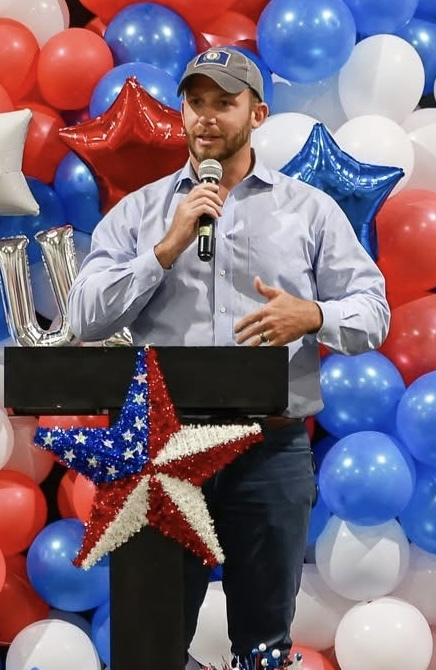
- Shell in 2024

36th Agriculture Commissioner of Kentucky
- Incumbent
- Assumed office January 1, 2024
- Governor: Andy Beshear
- Preceded by: Ryan Quarles

Majority Leader of the Kentucky House of Representatives
- In office January 3, 2017 – January 1, 2019
- Speaker: Jeff Hoover; David Osborne (acting)
- Preceded by: Rocky Adkins
- Succeeded by: Bam Carney

Member of the Kentucky House of Representatives
- In office January 1, 2013 – January 1, 2019
- Preceded by: Lonnie Napier
- Succeeded by: Travis Brenda
- Constituency: 36th district (2013–2015); 71st district (2015–2019)

Personal details
- Born: December 1, 1987 (age 38) Danville, Kentucky, U.S.
- Party: Republican
- Education: Eastern Kentucky University (BS)
- Website: Campaign website

Jonathan Lance Shell (born December 1, 1987) is an American politician and farmer who has served as the 36th Kentucky Commissioner of Agriculture since 2024.

Previously, Shell served as a member of the Kentucky House of Representatives from 2013 to 2019, and as Majority Floor Leader from 2017 to 2019. He represented Kentucky's 36th and 71st House districts, which both comprised Garrard and Rockcastle counties as well as part of Madison County.

== Early life and education ==
Jonathan Lance Shell was born on December 1, 1987, in Danville, Kentucky, and was raised on his family's multi-generation cattle and tobacco farm in Garrard County.

He graduated from Garrard County High School in 2006, where he was a member of the school's Future Farmers of America chapter. In 2010, Shell earned a Bachelor of Science degree in agriculture from Eastern Kentucky University.

== Political career ==
=== State Representative ===
While Shell was initially encouraged to seek a seat on the Lancaster city council in 2012, he instead chose to run for Kentucky's 36th House district. Incumbent Lonnie Napier had chosen to retire at the end of his term, and supported Nathan Mick, Garrard County's economic development director, as his replacement. Despite this, Shell won the 2012 Republican primary with 2,102 votes (59.8%) and the 2012 Kentucky House of Representatives election with 11,933 votes (63.3%) against Democratic nominee Bradley Montgomery.

Shell was the youngest member of the Kentucky General Assembly when he assumed office on January 1, 2013, at age 24.

During the 2016 Kentucky House of Representatives election, Shell headed the House Republican campaign committee and was tasked with recruiting candidates. Following Republican victories across the state, Senator Mitch McConnell credited Shell with the party taking control of the chamber for the first time since 1920: "A lot of us participated, but he was the indispensable man in getting us the majority."

In January 2017, Shell was selected as the first Republican majority floor leader and the youngest majority floor leader in Kentucky history.

He was defeated for reelection in the 2018 Republican primary, garnering 4,118 votes (49.3%) against Travis Brenda, a teacher at Rockcastle County High School.

=== Commissioner of Agriculture ===
In August 2022, Shell announced his candidacy to be the next Kentucky Commissioner of Agriculture. He won the 2023 Republican primary with 148,170 votes (56.4%) against state representative and House Agriculture Committee chairman Richard Heath, and the 2023 Kentucky Commissioner of Agriculture election with 763,468 votes (59.4%) against Democratic nominee Sierra Enlow.

On December 30, 2025, Shell announced his intentions to seek reelection as commissioner in 2027.

Party political offices
Preceded by Ryan Quarles	Republican nominee for Agriculture Commissioner of Kentucky; 2023	Most recent
Political offices
Preceded by Ryan Quarles	Agriculture Commissioner of Kentucky; 2024–present	Incumbent
