= Allison Ball =

American politician (born 1981)

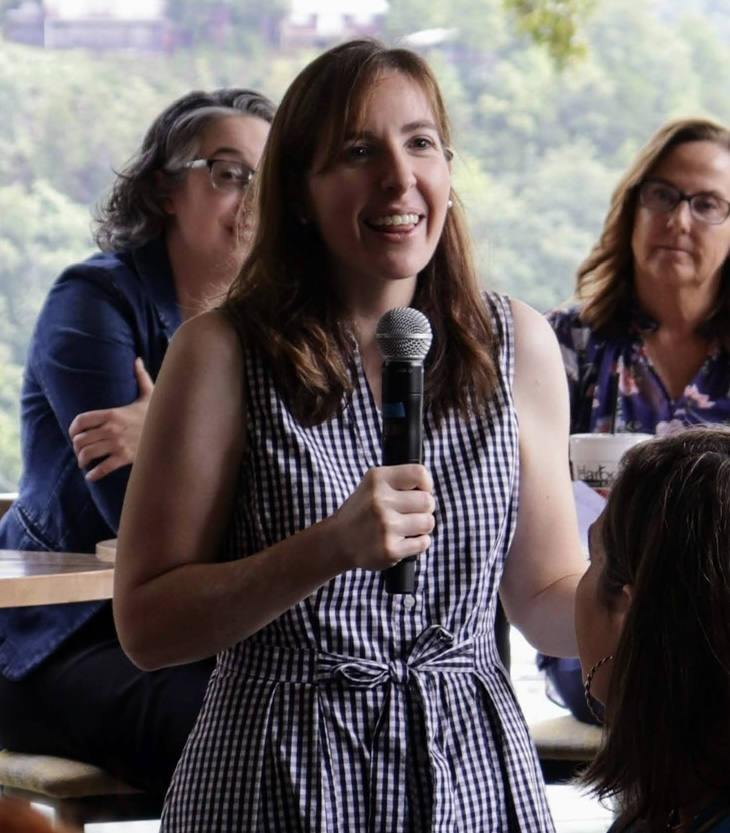
- Ball in 2023

49th Auditor of Kentucky
- Incumbent
- Assumed office January 1, 2024
- Governor: Andy Beshear
- Preceded by: Mike Harmon

42nd Treasurer of Kentucky
- In office January 4, 2016 – January 1, 2024
- Governor: Matt Bevin; Andy Beshear
- Preceded by: Todd Hollenbach
- Succeeded by: Mark Metcalf

Personal details
- Born: August 27, 1981 (age 44)
- Party: Republican
- Spouse: Asa Swan
- Children: 2
- Education: Liberty University (BS); University of Kentucky (JD)

Allison Joy Ball (born August 27, 1981) is an American attorney and politician who is the Kentucky State Auditor. She served as the Kentucky State Treasurer from 2016 to 2024. Ball is a member of the Republican Party.

== Early years and career ==
Ball is a ninth-generation Eastern Kentuckian. Her family has resided in Eastern Kentucky since the 1790s. She is the daughter of Ron and Amy Ball and has a younger brother, Jonathan.

Ball earned a Juris Doctor from the University of Kentucky College of Law. She worked for the personal injury law firm Vanover, Hall & Bartley. She served for four years as an Assistant Floyd County Attorney prosecuting child abuse and juvenile delinquency cases.

Ball was elected state treasurer in the 2015 elections, defeating state representative Rick Nelson. She was reelected in 2019. As treasurer, Ball sought to blacklist JPMorgan Chase and Citibank due to their stances on climate change.

In July 2022, Ball announced that she would run for Kentucky State Auditor in the 2023 elections. Ball defeated Derek Petteys to win the Republican nomination. She defeated Kim Reeder in the general election.

== Personal life ==
Ball lives in Prestonsburg, Kentucky. She is married to Asa James Swan. On July 3, 2018, Ball gave birth to a son, Levi Adrian Swan, making history by becoming the first statewide officer in Kentucky to give birth while in office.

== Electoral history ==
Kentucky Treasurer Republican Primary Election, 2015
Party	Candidate	Votes	%
Republican	Allison Ball	84,251	46.80
Republican	Jon Larson	55,715	30.95
Republican	Kenny Imes	40,040	22.24

Kentucky Treasurer Election, 2015
Party	Candidate	Votes	%
Republican	Allison Ball	571,911	60.64
Democratic	Rick Nelson	371,229	39.36

Kentucky Treasurer Election, 2019
Party	Candidate	Votes	%
Republican	Allison Ball	856,150	60.07
Democratic	Michael Bowman	555,259	39.03

Party political offices
Preceded by K. C. Crosbie	Republican nominee for Treasurer of Kentucky; 2015, 2019	Succeeded by Mark Metcalf
Preceded by Mike Harmon	Republican nominee for Auditor of Kentucky; 2023	Most recent
Political offices
Preceded by Todd Hollenbach	Treasurer of Kentucky; 2016–2024	Succeeded by Mark Metcalf
Preceded by Mike Harmon	Auditor of Kentucky; 2024–present	Incumbent
