= Kentucky Democratic Party =

Kentucky affiliate of the Democratic Party

- Kentucky Democrats Logo
- Chairperson: Colmon Elridge
- Governor of Kentucky: Andy Beshear
- Lieutenant Governor of Kentucky: Jacqueline Coleman
- Senate Leader: Gerald Neal
- House Leader: Pamela Stevenson
- Founded: 1828
- Headquarters: Frankfort, Kentucky
- Registered voters (August 2026): 1,371,014
- National affiliation: Democratic Party
- Colors: Blue
- Statewide Executive Offices: 2 / 7
- Kentucky Senate: 6 / 38
- Kentucky House of Representatives: 20 / 100
- United States Senate: 0 / 2
- United States House of Representatives: 1 / 6

Election symbol

Website
- https://kydemocrats.org

The Kentucky Democratic Party is the affiliate of the Democratic Party in the U.S. state of Kentucky. It is currently the minority party in the state, as the rival Republican Party of Kentucky overwhelmingly dominates in the state legislature, congressional delegation, and presidential elections. However, the party does currently control the governorship and lieutenant governorship, and maintains some strength in local elections.

Historically, the Democratic Party dominated in Kentucky, particularly in state elections, and led in party registration as recently as 2022; even today, a sizable 43.6% of voters are registered Democrats. However, this metric obscures the fact that a large number of registered Democrats in the commonwealth routinely vote Republican. This has been attributed to the fact that Kentucky is contained within the Bible Belt, with many of these voters holding socially conservative views.

== Party by-laws ==
The structure of the Kentucky Democratic Party states that the power rests in the hands of the members and is to be conducted in accordance with the Constitutions of the United States and the Commonwealth of Kentucky. A member is anyone who is registered as a Democrat in the Commonwealth of Kentucky, and states that no discrimination will take part in anyone wishing to join the party.

Governing of the Kentucky Democratic Party articulates that proxy votes are not permitted and unit rules are forbidden. The organization aims to take strong stances against forcing members to vote a certain way, but instead endorses all candidates which meet their ideological structure most effectively.

The functions of the State Party are orchestrated by the State Central Executive Committee, County Executive Committees, and Precinct Committees. The members of each committee are nominated and elected at their respective conventions during a party-wide reorganization from the precinct level up which begins in April of every Presidential election year. Members of each precinct must select one man, one woman, and one youth to represent their precinct. One member is then selected as the Precinct Chair. Those elected to their Precinct Committee then meet for the County Convention wherein they elect 10 men and 10 women to serve on as members of the County Executive Committee, who in turn elect a Chair and Vice Chair. Also at the County Convention, certain members will be nominated to represent the county at the Kentucky Democratic Convention to elect new members to the State Central Executive Committee as well as delegates to the Democratic National Convention.

== Kentucky Democratic Party Executive Committee (2020-2024) ==
| Central Leadership | Congressional District 1 | Congressional District 2 |
|---|---|---|
| Colmon Elridge, Chair | Jeff Taylor, CD1 | Collin Morris, CD2 |
| Colleen Younger, Vice Chair | Crystal Chappell, CD1 | Patti Minter, CD2 |
| Charlotte Flanary, Secretary | Susanna French, CD1 | Jeanie Smith, CD2 |
| Lindy Karns, Treasurer | Brenna Caudill, CD1 | James Line, CD2 |
| John Weber, General Counsel | | |
| Rick Adams, Deputy General Counsel | | |
| Congressional District 3 | Congressional District 4 | Congressional District 5 |
| Robert Kahne, CD3 | Col Owens, CD4 | Ralph Hoskins, CD5 |
| Corrie Shull, CD3 | Craig Miller, CD4 | Johnny Ray Turner, CD5 |
| Queenie Averette, CD3 | Danielle Bell, CD4 | Ashley Adkins, CD5 |
| Pamela Stevenson, CD3 | Nicole Erwin, CD4 | Laura White-Brown, CD5 |
| Mera Corlett, CD3 | Ellen Cartmell, CD4 | Ariana Velasquez, CD5 |
| Congressional District 6 | At-Large Members | Other Members |
| Trent Garrison, CD6 | LaToya Drake, At Large | Jack Dulworth, DNC |
| Will Haydon, CD6 | Roy Harrison, At Large | Cherlynn Stevenson, House Caucus |
| Denise Gray, CD6 | Josh Mers, At Large | Reggie Thomas, Senate Caucus |
| Brenda Monarrez, CD6 | Jeff Noble, At Large | Allison Wiseman, Young Democrats |
| Vacant | Cody Pruitt, At Large | JoAnne Bland, Democratic Women's Club |
| | Dorsey Ridley, At Large | George Wright, Veterans Caucus |
| | Rachel Roberts, At Large | William Compton, Rural Council |
| | John Stovall, At Large | Nisia Thorton, LGBTQIA Council |

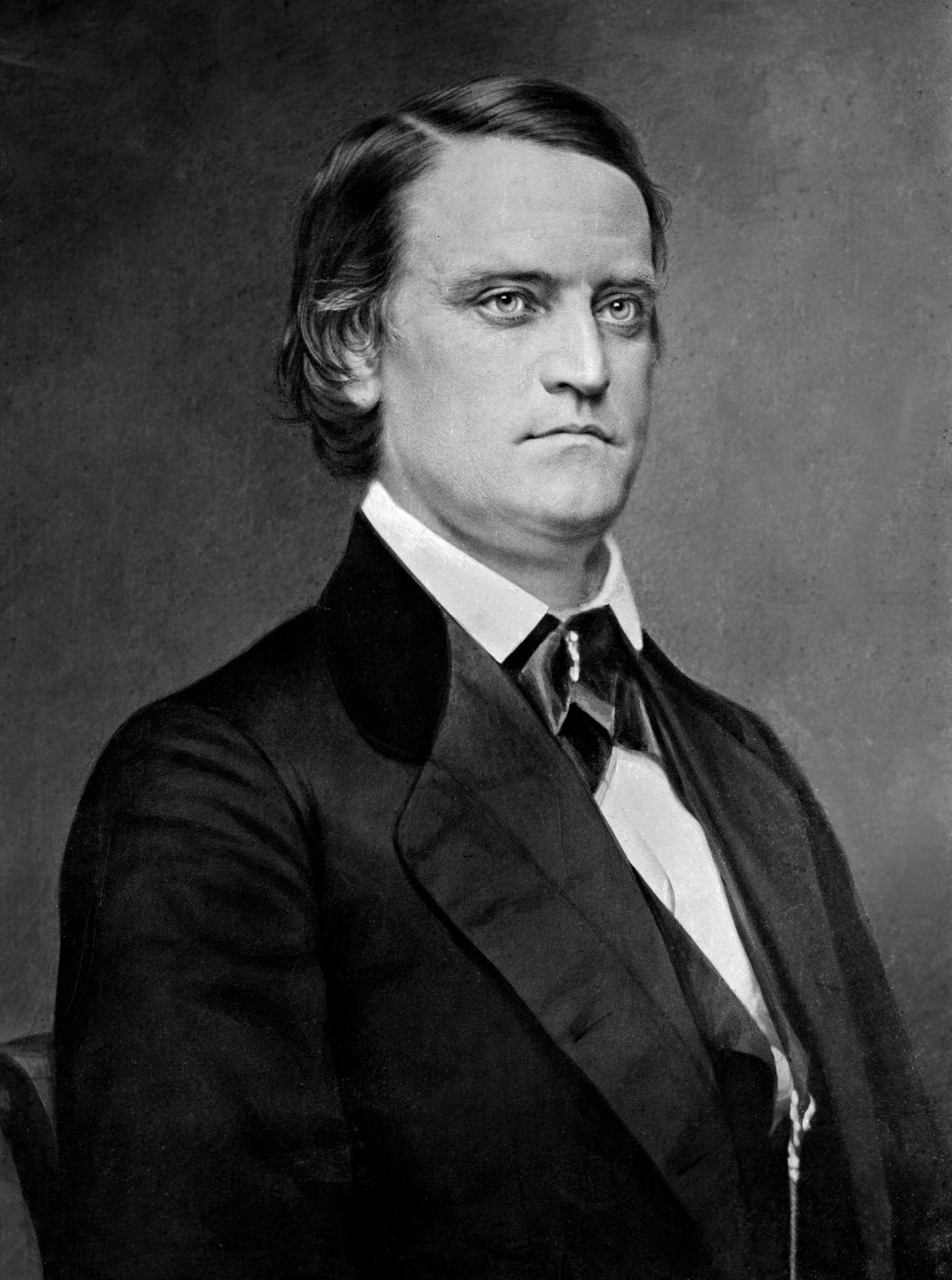
Vice President John C. Breckinridge

== History ==
A rural Southern state, Kentucky politics have historically favored the Democratic Party, although the state has in recent years rapidly shifted towards the Republican Party. There has been no Democratic president from Kentucky, but there have been three Democratic vice presidents from the state. The first vice president from Kentucky, Richard M. Johnson, was the ninth Vice President of the United States. In the earliest part of the 19th century, Johnson was a supporter of the Democratic-Republican Party during his service in the U.S. House. Johnson would work to secure pensions for widows and orphans of wars, in particular those following the War of 1812, a stance that would set precedence for future Kentucky Democrats. Johnson would later become a strong supporter and influence in the Democratic Party along with his service in the White House from 1837 to 1840.

John C. Breckinridge served as the 14th Vice President (1857–1861) and a notable figure in the early Democratic Party of Kentucky. Although Breckinridge claimed that he was not an anti-Union demonstrator during the civil war, he strongly supported states' rights to allow slavery and would go on to be an officer in the Confederate Army.

Kentucky Democrat Alben W. Barkley served under Harry S. Truman as the U.S. vice president from 1949 to 1953, and began his political career in the state as a county judge. He would later be elected to the United States House of Representatives and the Senate, advocating strongly for Woodrow Wilson's liberal policies, and alter those of the Roosevelt Administration as well.

Democrats have largely dominated the office of governor in the Commonwealth. Out of 26 governors since 1900, only seven did not serve as members of the Democratic Party.

A priority for Kentucky Democrats in the 2010s and 2020s has been increasing the minimum wage.

== Current elected officials ==
=== Members of Congress ===
==== U.S. Senate ====
- None

Both of Kentucky's U.S. Senate seats have been held by Republicans since 1998. Wendell Ford was the last Democrat to represent Kentucky in the U.S. Senate. First elected in 1974, Ford opted to retire instead of seeking a fifth term. Congressman Scotty Baesler ran as the Democratic nominee in the 1998 election and was subsequently defeated by Republican challenger Jim Bunning.

==== U.S. House of Representatives ====
Out of the six seats Kentucky is apportioned in the U.S. House of Representatives, one is held by a Democrat:

| District | Member | Photo |
|---|---|---|
| 3rd | Morgan McGarvey | |
| 6th | Zach Dembo (elect) | |

==== Statewide offices ====
Democrats control two of the seven elected statewide offices:

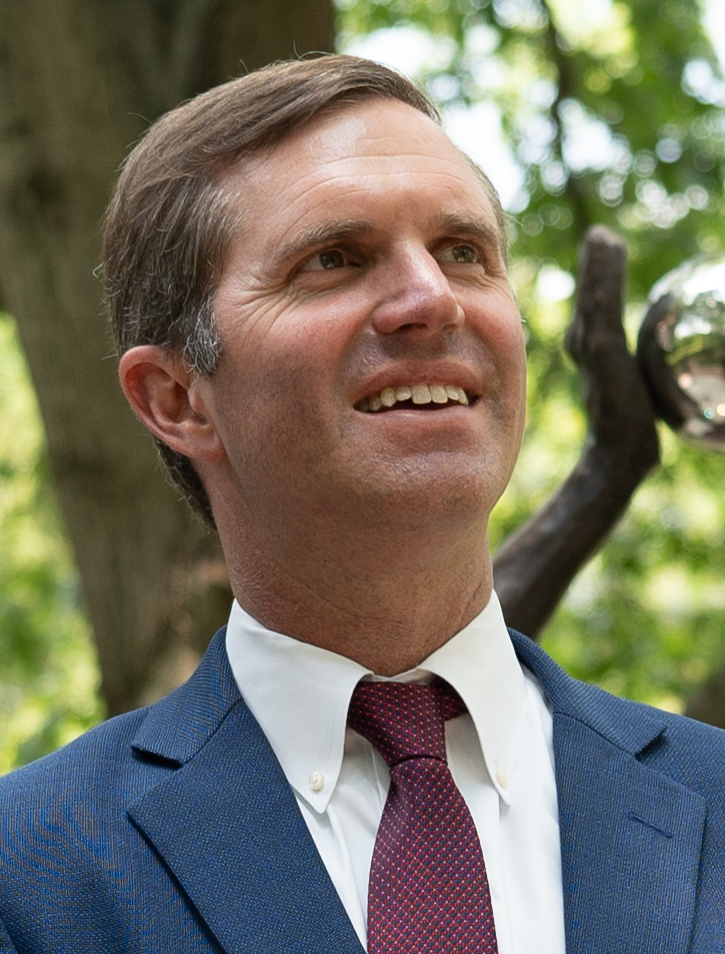
Governor Andy Beshear

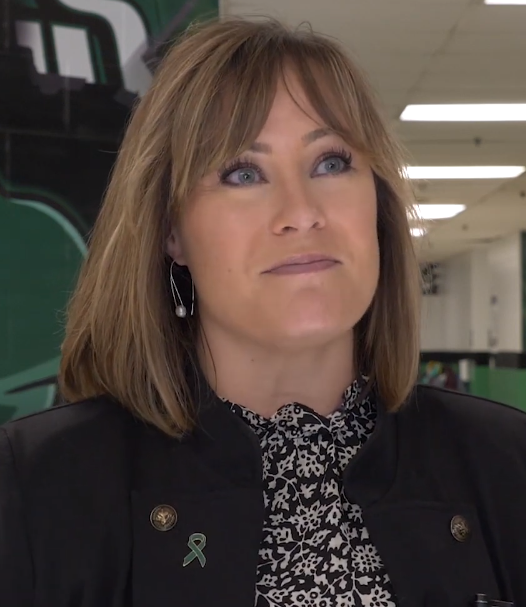
Lieutenant Governor
Jacqueline Coleman

=== State legislative leaders ===
- Senate Minority Leader: Gerald Neal
- Senate Minority Whip: Cassie Chambers Armstrong
- Senate Minority Caucus Chair: Reggie Thomas
- House Minority Leader: Pamela Stevenson
- House Minority Whip: Joshua Watkins
- House Minority Caucus Chair: Lindsey Burke

=== Chief Executive Officers ===
Chair: Colmon Elridge

=== Mayors ===
- Louisville: Craig Greenberg (1)
- Pikeville: James A. Carter

== Kentucky General Assembly ==
=== House of Representatives ===
In the House of Representatives, Democrats hold a minority of seats. The Democratic Party in the House is led by the Minority Floor Leader Pamela Stevenson; Minority Caucus Chair is Lindsey Burke and Minority Whip is Joshua Watkins.

=== Senate ===
In the Senate, Democrats hold a minority of seats. Leading figures of the Democratic Party in the Senate include Minority Floor Leader Gerald Neal, Minority Caucus Chairman Reggie Thomas, and Minority Whip Cassie Chambers Armstrong.

== Ideology ==
=== Health care ===
Since the passage of the Affordable Care Act, Kentucky Democrats have supported expanding Medicaid under the law. Under the Act, health care providers also cannot refuse coverage based on preexisting conditions.

In 2006, 2,000,231 people between the ages of 25 and 64 were living in Kentucky, and an estimated 19% were living without health insurance. By 2020, the uninsured rate in Kentucky had fallen to 5.5%, and about a half-million Kentuckians had gained insurance under Medicaid expansion.

=== Infrastructure ===
The Kentucky Infrastructure Authority was founded in 1988 to develop and fund a better infrastructure for the state. Its main reason for existence has been to finance local development and works as an office under the Governor.

In 2009, the Kentucky Infrastructure Authority distributed 47.8 million dollars to fund wastewater infrastructure projects. An additional 18.9 million dollars was made available to improve funding for drinking water projects in the state. The funding was to be distributed through the Clean Water State Revolving Fund and the Drinking Water State Revolving Fund, which were directly funded by the American Recovery and Reinvestment Act of 2009, which was strongly supported by Democrats and implemented by President Obama. Governor Beshear, a strong supporter of President Obama's Reinvestment Act, stated that these infrastructure improvements will not only create jobs but address short and long-term water challenges for the state of Kentucky.

== Election results ==
=== Federal ===
==== U.S. House ====
| Election | Votes | % | Seats (KY) | ± | % |
|---|---|---|---|---|---|
| 2016 | 516,904 | 29.28 | 1 / 6 | 0 | 7.14 |
| 2018 | 613,040 | 39.05 | 1 / 6 | 0 | 9.77 |
| 2020 | 735,419 | 4.29 | 1 / 6 | 0 | 4.72 |
| 2022 | 490,921 | 33.55 | 1 / 6 | 0 | 1.21 |
| 2024 | 511,998 | 26.87 | 1 / 6 | 0 | 6.68 |
| 2026 | 622,448 | 43.76 | 2 / 6 | ▲1 | 16.89 |

=== State ===
==== Executive offices ====
Governor
| Election | Candidate | Votes | % | Result |
|---|---|---|---|---|
| 1971 | Wendell Ford | 470,720 | 50.57% | Won ✓ |
| 1975 | Julian Carroll | 470,159 | 62.84% | Won ✓ |
| 1979 | John Y. Brown Jr. | 558,088 | 59.49% | Won ✓ |
| 1983 | Martha Layne Collins | 561,674 | 54.50% | Won ✓ |
| 1987 | Wallace Wilkinson | 504,674 | 64.50% | Won ✓ |
| 1991 | Brereton Jones | 540,468 | 64.73% | Won ✓ |
| 1995 | Paul E. Patton/Steve Henry | 500,605 | 50.88% | Won ✓ |
| 1999 | Paul E. Patton/Steve Henry | 352,099 | 60.70% | Won ✓ |
| 2003 | Ben Chandler/Charlie Owen | 487,159 | 44.96% | Lost ✗ |
| 2007 | Steve Beshear/Daniel Mongiardo | 619,552 | 58.75% | Won ✓ |
| 2011 | Steve Beshear/Jerry Abramson | 464,245 | 55.72% | Won ✓ |
| 2015 | Jack Conway/Sannie Overly | 426,620 | 43.81% | Lost ✗ |
| 2019 | Andy Beshear/Jacqueline Coleman | 709,890 | 49.19% | Won ✓ |
| 2023 | Andy Beshear/Jacqueline Coleman | 694,482 | 52.53% | Won ✓ |

== See also ==
- Political party strength in Kentucky
