= Ed Gallrein =

American politician (born 1958)

- Gallrein in 2026

Member-elect of the U.S. House of Representatives from Kentucky's 4th district
- Assuming office January 3, 2027
- Succeeding: Thomas Massie

Personal details
- Born: Edward Gibson Gallrein III; April 20, 1958 (age 68) Shelbyville, Kentucky, U.S.
- Party: Republican (since 2021)
- Other political affiliations: Independent (2016–2021)
- Spouses: Mary Stuart (m. 1985, divorced); Heather Gallrein (m. 2022; div. 2024)
- Education: Centre College (attended); Murray State University (BS, MS); Naval Postgraduate School (MS); Air University (MS)
- Website: Campaign website

Military service
- Allegiance: United States
- Branch/service: United States Navy
- Years of service: 1984–2014
- Rank: Captain
- Awards: Bronze Star Medal (3)

Edward Gibson Gallrein III (born April 20, 1958) is an American farmer and former Navy SEAL officer. A member of the Republican Party, Gallrein is the incoming United States Representative for Kentucky's 4th congressional district, elected in 2026 and due to take office in 2027.

Gallrein defeated Republican seven-term incumbent Thomas Massie in the most expensive U.S House primary election in American history, and then defeated Democratic nominee Melissa Strange and Libertarian candidate Jeremy Todd in the general election. Gallrein was endorsed by President Donald Trump, with the race largely seen as a referendum on Trump's second presidency amid the 2026 Iran war.

== Early life and education ==
Edward Gibson Gallrein III was born on April 20, 1958. Gallrein is the son of Fay Hays and Edward Gallrein Jr. Gallrein's father was a farmer in Logan County, Kentucky, and Gallrein grew up on the family farm. Gallrein himself is a fifth-generation Kentucky farmer.

Gallrein graduated from Franklin-Simpson High School in 1975. He attended Centre College, where he played varsity football for the Centre Colonels. Gallrein then graduated from Murray State University with a bachelor's degree in Agriculture in 1981, and a Master of Science in Agriculture - Agribusiness Economics in 1984. He played football for the Murray State Racers.

He later attended the Naval Postgraduate School where he received a Master of Science in Financial Management with honors. He then attended the Air War College at Air University where he received a Master of Strategic Studies degree with distinction.

== Military career ==
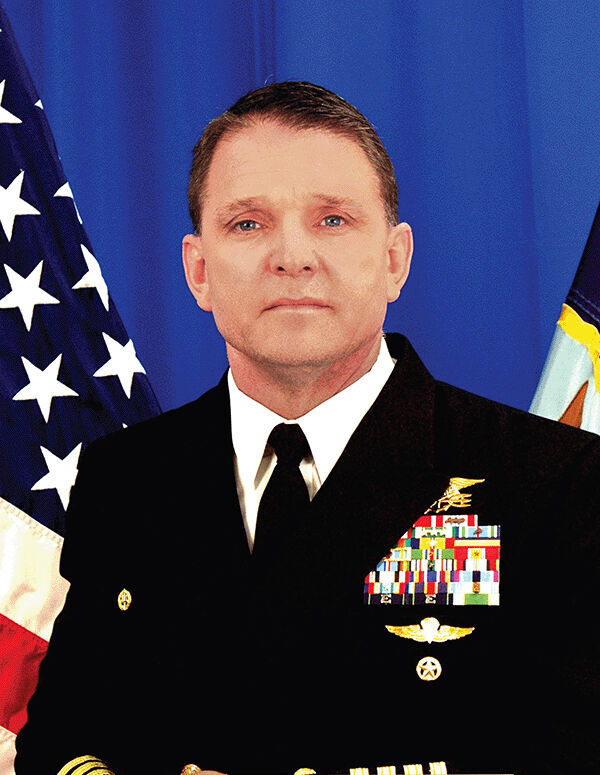
Gallrein in 2014

Gallrein served in the U.S. military for three decades, from 1984 to 2014, serving with U.S. Navy SEAL Team Six. He rose to the rank of Navy captain, as he was deployed to Panama, Afghanistan, Iraq, and the Persian Gulf.

He was inspired to join the military by President Ronald Reagan. By November 1985, Gallrein had become an ensign in the United States Navy and was stationed at Little Creek Naval Amphibious Base. During his 2026 political campaign, Gallrein said that he had received four Bronze Star Medals; Gallrein was awarded three—the fourth appears to be the bronze star on his Combat Parachutist Badge. He also has two Presidential Unit Citations.

After his military career, Gallrein turned to becoming a dairy farmer and a business owner operating Circle G Farm and Stables in Shelby County since 2014.

== Political career ==
=== 2024 Kentucky Senate campaign ===
On August 17, 2023, Gallrein announced that he would run in the 2024 Kentucky Senate election for the state's 7th district as a Republican. By April 2024, he had garnered $169,000, largely from operatives within the Republican Party of Kentucky, including its former chairman, Mac Brown; donor Wayne Hunt; and Michael Adams, the state's secretary of state.

Gallrein lost the Republican nomination to Aaron Reed by 118 votes (39.3% to 38.3%). Gallrein requested a recanvass, which reaffirmed Reed's victory.

=== 2026 U.S. House of Representatives campaign ===
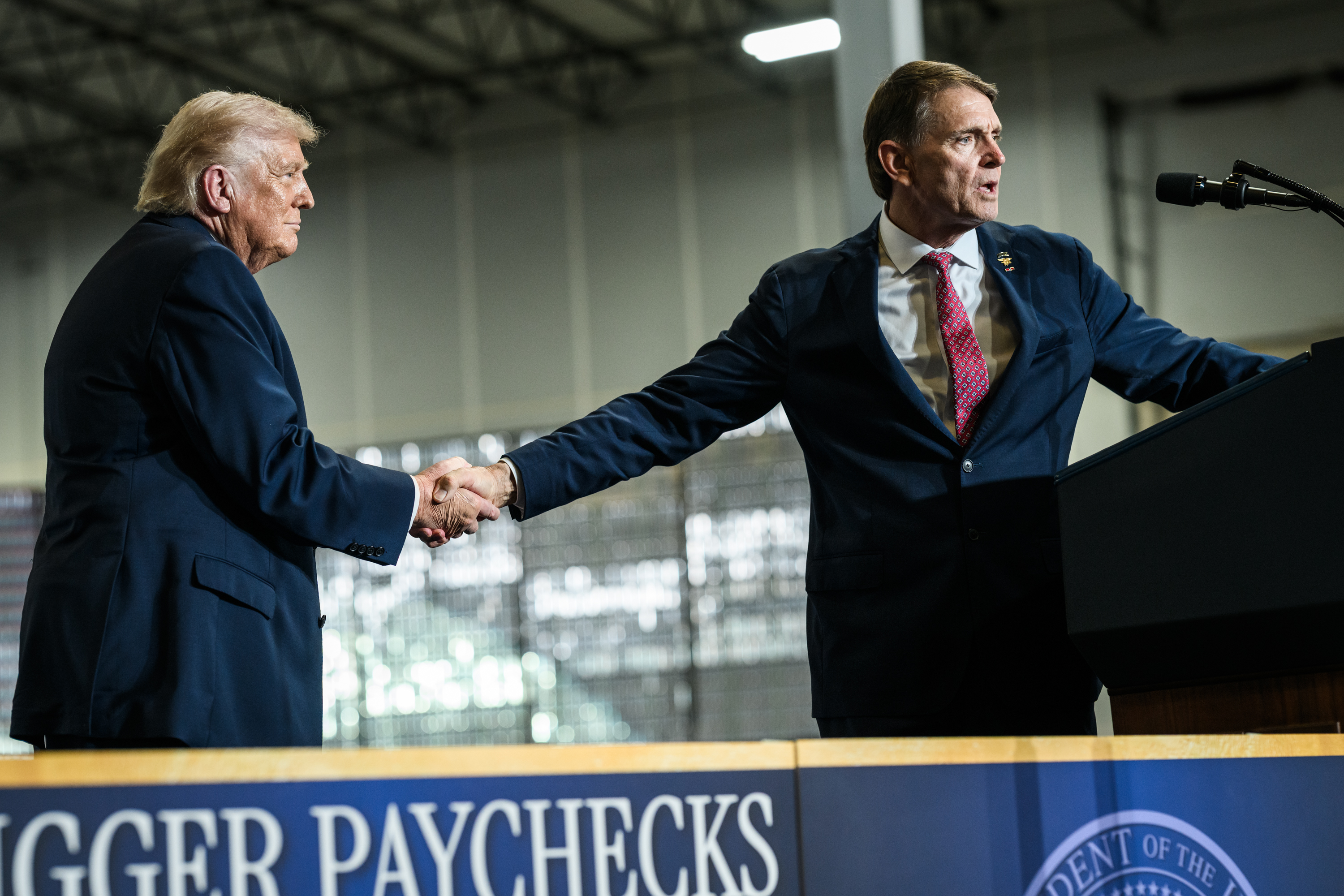
Gallrein with U.S. President Donald Trump at Verst Logistics Manufacturing in Hebron, Kentucky

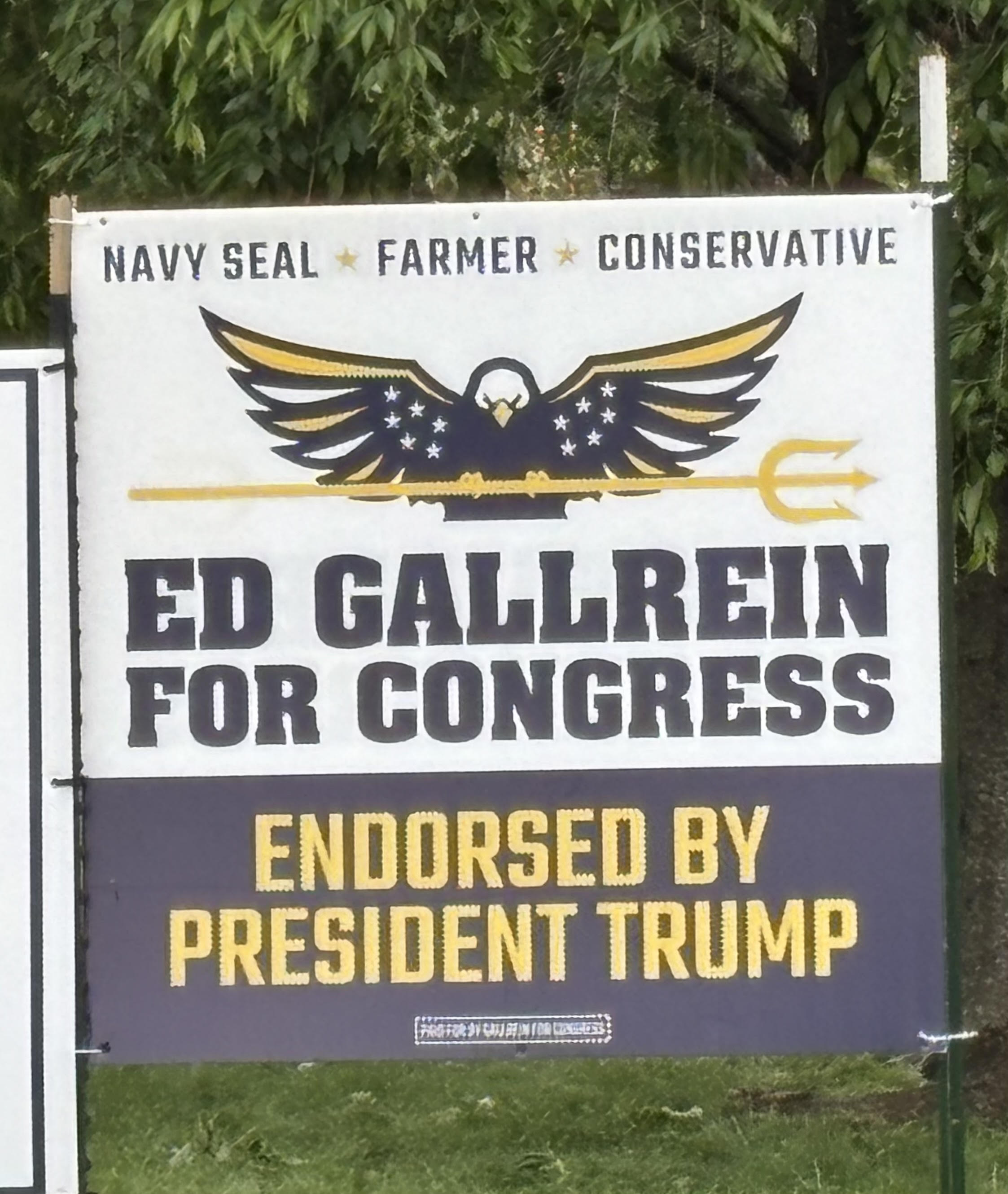
Political sign for Ed Gallrein

2026 Republican primary results by county: Gallrein: 50–60%; 60–70%; Massie: 50–60%; 60–70%

On October 17, 2025, President Donald Trump endorsed Gallrein for Kentucky's 4th congressional district. On October 21, Gallrein announced his candidacy for the United States House of Representatives, challenging seven-term incumbent Thomas Massie in the Republican primary. Massie had held the seat since 2012 and was considered to be popular within the district; in 2024, he had won the Republican primary with 76% of the vote and the general election with 99.6% of the vote. However, by March 2025, Trump had openly called for a primary challenge to Massie in response to his votes on the 2025 federal budget. Other high-profile clashes between the two included Massie's vote against the One Big Beautiful Bill Act, his advocacy for the release of the Epstein files, and his condemnation of U.S. strikes on Iranian nuclear sites.

During the campaign, pro-Massie and pro-Gallrein PACs both used AI-generated political ads to attack each other's campaigns. One AI-generated ad from pro-Gallrein PAC MAGA KY included imagery of Massie having a threesome with pro-Palestinian Democratic representatives Ilhan Omar and Alexandria Ocasio-Cortez. Massie, Omar, and former Rep. Marjorie Taylor Greene condemned the ad, with Greene accusing the ad of violating the TAKE IT DOWN Act. On May 16, a pro-Trump group announced that Secretary of Defense Pete Hegseth would visit Kentucky to raise support for Gallrein. Hegseth's move was accused by critics of violating the Hatch Act, which the White House denied. During the campaign, Gallrein declined to debate Massie, ignored most interview requests, and conducted few public rallies.

On May 11, 2026, the primary became the most expensive U.S. House primary in American history, with over $25.6 million in ad spending beating the prior record of $25.2 million from the Democratic primary for New York's 16th congressional district in 2024. By May 17, ad spending exceeded $32 million. Gallrein won the Republican nomination on May 19, 2026, 54.9%–45.1%, winning 19 of the 21 counties that voted. After the race was called in Gallrein's favor, he said: "It was a David versus Goliath. I was the underdog."

Gallrein defeated Democrat Melissa Strange in the general election on November 3, 2026.

== Political positions ==
Gallrein was a registered Republican until May 2016, when he left the party to become an independent. He rejoined the Republican Party in June 2021.

=== Economy and cost of living ===
Gallrein supports cutting taxes, reducing regulations, and decreasing government spending.

=== Border control and fentanyl ===
Gallein supports border enforcement, fully funding the U.S. Border Patrol and U.S. Immigration and Customs Enforcement, completing the Mexico–United States border wall, and putting an end to the flow of illegal drugs such as fentanyl into the United States and the United States opioid epidemic.

=== Diversity, equity, and inclusion ===
Gallrein is opposed to the idea of diversity, equity, and inclusion and believes that these principles should be removed from schools, the military, and the government.

=== Second Amendment rights ===
Gallrein said that "the Second Amendment is under constant attack from the radical left" and believes that U.S. citizens should maintain the right to keep and bear arms.

=== Foreign policy ===
Gallrein supported the 2026 U.S. intervention in Venezuela.

Commenting on the 2026 Iran War, Gallrein said on X on February 28, 2026, that the United States' attack on Iran: "sends a clear message to the world: The United States will not sit back while a hostile regime continually threatens our Nation, our allies, and global stability as Iran has for decades as the leading state sponsor of terrorism been responsible for the death of U.S. citizens and servicemembers.... Decisive action, clear objectives, and overwhelming strength save American lives and prevent larger wars, death, and destruction."

== Personal life ==
Gallrein lives in Shelbyville, Kentucky.

In December 1985, Gallrein married Mary E. Stuart. According to court filings, Gallrein filed to divorce his second wife, Heather Gallrein, in 2024 (one month after losing the Kentucky state legislature election). According to court filings, he told her to "get out of his house" and decided to cut her off financially. Gallrein has denied this claim.

== Electoral history ==
=== Kentucky Senate ===
2024 Kentucky's 7th Senate district Republican primary election
Party	Candidate	Votes	%
Republican	Aaron Reed	4,826	39.3
Republican	Ed Gallrein	4,708	38.3
Republican	Adrienne E. Southworth	2,747	22.3
Total votes		12,281	100.0

=== U.S. House of Representatives ===
==== 2026 ====
2026 Kentucky's 4th congressional district election
Party	Candidate	Votes	%
Republican	Ed Gallrein	57,822	54.9
Republican	Thomas Massie (incumbent)	47,539	45.1
Total votes		105,361	100.0

2026 Kentucky's 4th congressional district general election
Party	Candidate	Votes	%
Republican	Ed Gallrein	137,623	54.2
Democratic	Melissa Strange	103,713	40.9
Libertarian	Jeremy Todd	12,484	4.9
Total votes		253,820	100.0
Republican hold			

== See also ==
- List of United States Navy SEALs

U.S. House of Representatives
Preceded by Thomas Massie	Member of the U.S. House of Representatives from Kentucky's 4th congressional district Taking office 2027	Elect
