= 2024 Kentucky Senate election =

- November 5, 2024

19 out of 38 seats in the Kentucky Senate 20 seats needed for a majority
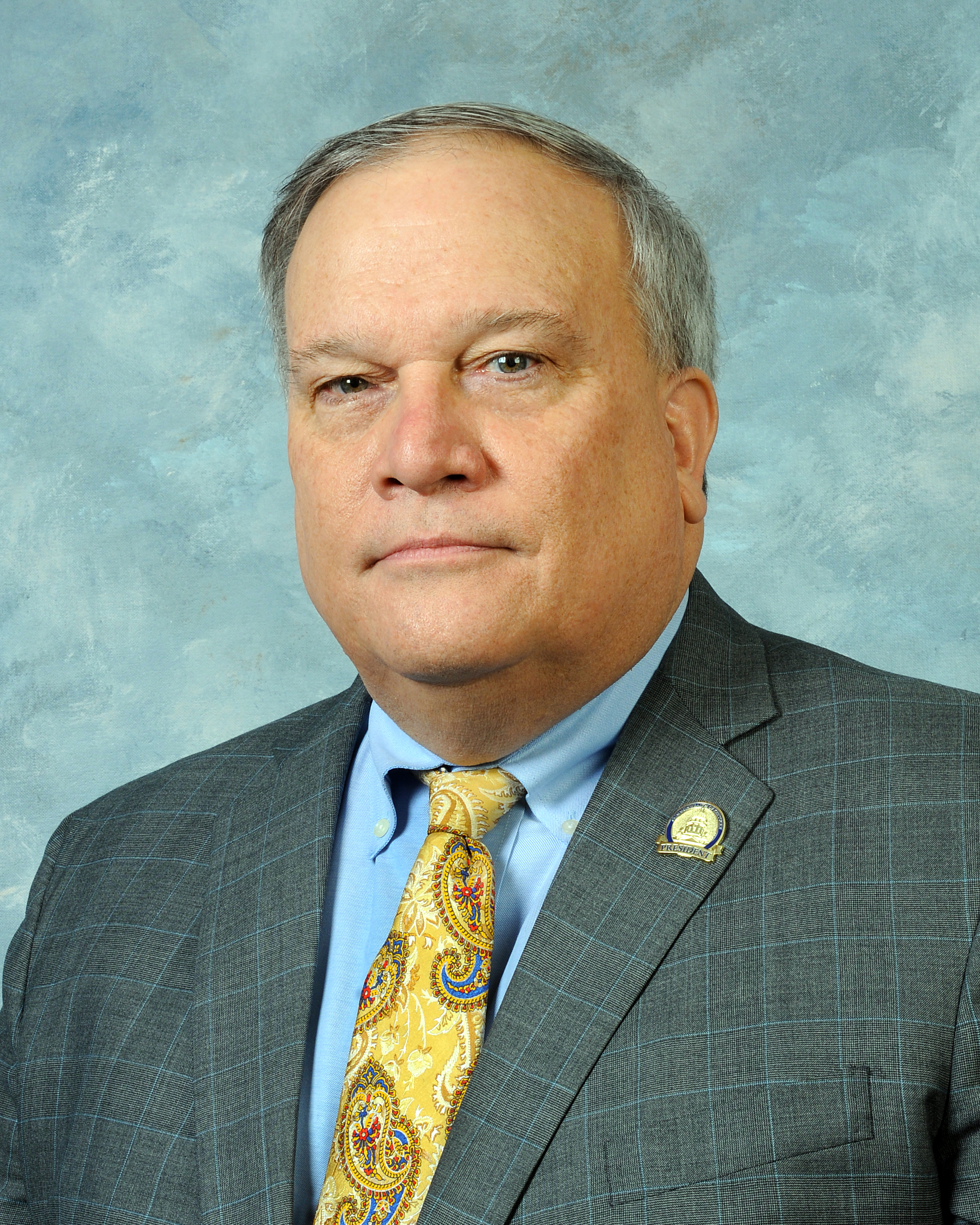

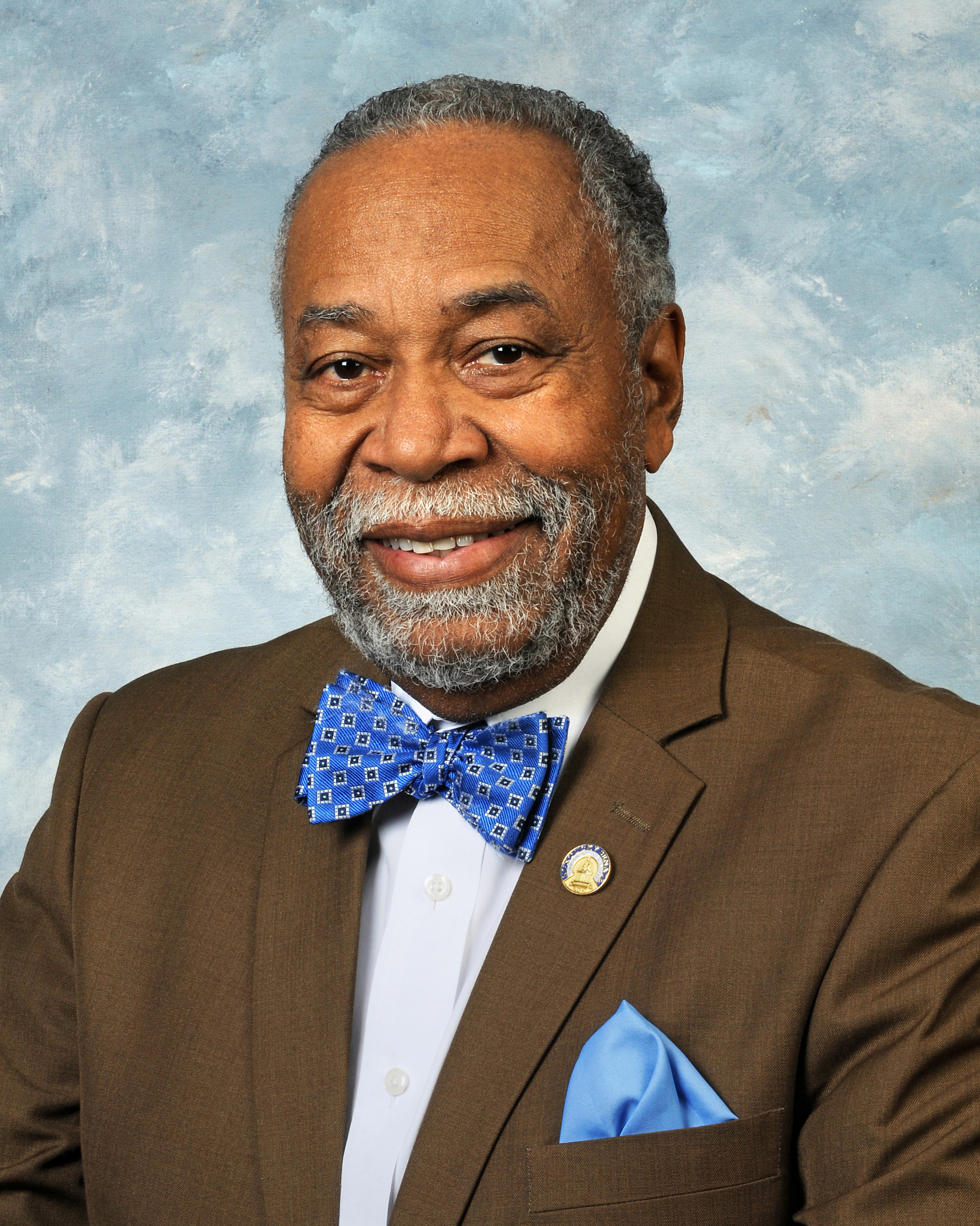
	Majority party	Minority party
Leader	Robert Stivers	Gerald A. Neal
Party	Republican	Democratic
Leader since	January 8, 2013	January 3, 2023
Leader's seat	25th – Manchester	33rd – Louisville
Last election	31	7
Seats won	31	7
Seat change	Steady	Steady
Seats up	14	5
Races won	14	5
- Republican hold Democratic hold No election 60–70% 70–80% >90% 60–70% >90% 30–40%
Senate President before election
Robert Stivers
Republican
Elected Senate President
Robert Stivers
Republican

The 2024 Kentucky Senate election was held on November 5, 2024. The Republican and Democratic primary elections were held on May 21. Half of the senate (all odd-numbered seats) was up for election. Following the 2022 election, Republicans and Democrats held 31 and seven seats, respectively. The deadline for candidates to file was January 5, 2024. Republicans maintained their majority in the chamber without gaining or losing any seats.

A numbered map of the senate districts can be viewed at the Kentucky Senate site.

== Overview ==
Party	Candidates		Votes	%	Seats			
Party	Opposed	Unopposed	Votes	%	Before	Won	After	+/−
Republican	7	7	536,258	65.68	31	13	31	-
Democratic	7	4	260,754	31.94	7	5	7	-
Write-in	11	0	19,402	2.38	N/A	1	N/A	N/A
Total	25	11	816,414	100.00	38	19	38	±0
Source: Kentucky Secretary of State

== Retiring incumbents ==
Retiring incumbents by district Democratic incumbent ran Democratic incumbent retired Republican incumbent ran Republican incumbent retired or lost renomination Vacant district

A total of four senators (one Democrat and three Republicans) retired, none of whom retired to run for other offices.

=== Democratic ===
1. 35th: Denise Harper Angel (Louisville): Retired.

=== Republican ===
1. 3rd: Whitney Westerfield (Fruit Hill): Retired.
2. 11th: John Schickel (Union): Retired.
3. 17th: Damon Thayer (Georgetown): Retired.

== Incumbents defeated ==
One incumbent lost renomination in the primary election.

=== In the primary election ===
==== Republicans ====
One Republican lost renomination.

1. 7th: Adrienne E. Southworth (first elected in 2020) lost renomination to Aaron Reed.

== Predictions ==
Source	Ranking	As of
Sabato's Crystal Ball	Safe R	October 23, 2024

== Summary by district ==
† – Incumbent did not seek re-election

District	Incumbent	Party	Elected	Party
1	Jason G. Howell	Rep	Jason G. Howell	Rep
3	Whitney Westerfield†	Rep	Craig B. Richardson	Rep
5	Stephen Meredith	Rep	Stephen Meredith	Rep
7	Adrienne E. Southworth	Rep	Aaron Reed	Rep
9	David P. Givens	Rep	David P. Givens	Rep
11	John Schickel†	Rep	Steve Rawlings	Rep
13	Reggie Thomas	Dem	Reggie Thomas	Dem
15	Rick Girdler	Rep	Rick Girdler	Rep
17	Damon Thayer†	Rep	Matt Nunn	Rep
19	Cassie Chambers Armstrong	Dem	Cassie Chambers Armstrong	Dem
21	Brandon J. Storm	Rep	Brandon J. Storm	Rep
23	Chris McDaniel	Rep	Chris McDaniel	Rep
25	Robert Stivers	Rep	Robert Stivers	Rep
27	Steve West	Rep	Steve West	Rep
29	Vacant		Scott Madon	Rep
31	C. Phillip Wheeler Jr.	Rep	C. Phillip Wheeler Jr.	Rep
33	Gerald A. Neal	Dem	Gerald A. Neal	Dem
35	Denise Harper Angel†	Dem	Keturah J. Herron	Dem
37	David Yates	Dem	David Yates	Dem

== Closest races ==
There were no seats where the margin of victory was under 10%.

== Special elections ==
=== District 19 special ===
Precinct results: Armstrong: 50–60%; 60–70%; 70–80%; 80–90%; >90%; Glin: 50–60%; 60–70%; 70–80%; >90%

Cassie Chambers Armstrong was elected in February 2023 following the resignation of Morgan McGarvey to become a U. S. Representative.

2023 Kentucky Senate 19th district special election
Party	Candidate	Votes	%
Democratic	Cassie Chambers Armstrong	8,139	77.1
Republican	Misty Glin	2,418	22.9
Total votes		10,557	100.0
Democratic hold			

=== District 28 special ===
Precinct results: Elkins: 30–40%; 40–50%; 50–60%; 60–70%; 70–80%; Sainte: 40–50%; 50–60%; 60–70%; 70–80%; 80–90%; >90%; Henderson: 40–50%

Greg Elkins was elected in May 2023 to fill the vacancy caused by the resignation of Ralph Alvarado in January 2023.

2023 Kentucky Senate 28th district special election
Party	Candidate	Votes	%
Republican	Greg Elkins	7,899	49.8
Democratic	Robert Sainte	4,968	31.3
Independent	Richard Henderson	3,001	18.9
Total votes		15,868	100.0
Republican hold			

== District 1 ==
=== Republican primary ===
==== Candidates ====
===== Nominee =====
- Jason G. Howell, incumbent senator

===== Eliminated in primary =====
- Lynn Bechler, representative from the 4th district (2013–2023)

==== Endorsements ====
Lynn Bechler

Organizations

- Kentucky Liberty Caucus
- Kentucky Right to Life Victory PAC
Jason G. Howell

Organizations

- Kentucky Chamber of Commerce
- NRA Political Victory Fund

==== Fundraising ====
Campaign finance reports as of May 8, 2024
Candidate	Raised	Spent	Cash on hand
Lynn Bechler	$30,565.54	$30,565.54	$0.00
Jason G. Howell	$163,968.20	$68,872.11	$95,096.09
Source: Kentucky Registry of Election Finance

==== Results ====
Republican primary results
Party	Candidate	Votes	%
Republican	Jason G. Howell (incumbent)	5,266	70.0
Republican	Lynn Bechler	2,258	30.0
Total votes		7,524	100.0

=== General election ===
==== Results ====
2024 Kentucky Senate 1st district election
Party	Candidate	Votes	%
Republican	Jason G. Howell (incumbent)	Unopposed	
Total votes		42,109	100.0
Republican hold			

== District 3 ==
Incumbent senator Whitney Westerfield retired.

=== Republican primary ===
==== Candidates ====
===== Nominee =====
- Craig B. Richardson, attorney

=== General election ===
==== Results ====
2024 Kentucky Senate 3rd district election
Party	Candidate	Votes	%
Republican	Craig B. Richardson	Unopposed	
Total votes		31,672	100.0
Republican hold			

== District 5 ==
=== Democratic primary ===
==== Candidates ====
===== Nominee =====
- Jamie Skudlarek, candidate for the Ohio County Board of Education in 2022

=== Republican primary ===
==== Candidates ====
===== Nominee =====
- Stephen Meredith, incumbent senator

===== Eliminated in primary =====
- Thomas Ballinger, veteran and beekeeper

==== Endorsements ====
Thomas Ballinger

Organizations

- Kentucky Liberty Caucus
Stephen Meredith

Organizations

- Kentucky Chamber of Commerce
- Kentucky Right to Life Victory PAC
- NRA Political Victory Fund

==== Fundraising ====
Final campaign finance reports
Candidate	Raised	Spent	Cash on hand
Thomas Ballinger	$5,421.15	$5,421.15	$0.00
Stephen Meredith	$145,501.04	$145,501.04	$0.00
Source: Kentucky Registry of Election Finance

==== Results ====
Republican primary results
Party	Candidate	Votes	%
Republican	Stephen Meredith (incumbent)	6,060	71.7
Republican	Thomas Ballinger	2,386	28.3
Total votes		8,446	100.0

=== General election ===
==== Endorsements ====
Jamie Skudlarek (D)

Organizations

- 314 Action
- The Fairness Campaign
- Kentucky AFL-CIO
- Kentucky Sierra Club
- Planned Parenthood Action Fund
- United Auto Workers
Stephen Meredith (R)

Organizations

- Kentucky Chamber of Commerce
- Kentucky Fraternal Order of Police
- Kentucky Right to Life Victory PAC
- NRA Political Victory Fund

==== Fundraising ====
Campaign finance reports as of October 27, 2024
Candidate	Raised	Spent	Cash on hand
Jamie Skudlarek (D)	$6,172.22	$5,601.36	$570.86
Stephen Meredith (R)	$50,993.84	$38,042.20	$12,951.64
Source: Kentucky Registry of Election Finance

==== Results ====
2024 Kentucky Senate 5th district election
Party	Candidate	Votes	%
Republican	Stephen Meredith (incumbent)	41,431	79.9
Democratic	Jamie Skudlarek	10,404	20.1
Total votes		51,835	100.0
Republican hold			

== District 7 ==
Incumbent senator Adrienne E. Southworth was defeated for renomination by Republican Aaron Reed.

=== Democratic primary ===
==== Candidates ====
===== Nominee =====
- Rhonda Davis, small business owner

=== Republican primary ===
==== Candidates ====
===== Nominee =====
- Aaron Reed, veteran and firearms manufacturer

===== Eliminated in primary =====
- Ed Gallrein, veteran and farmer
- Adrienne E. Southworth, incumbent senator

==== Endorsements ====
Ed Gallrein

Organizations

- Kentucky Chamber of Commerce
Aaron Reed

Organizations

- Americans for Prosperity-Kentucky
- Kentucky Liberty Caucus (co-endorsement with Southworth)
- Kentucky Right to Life Victory PAC (co-endorsement with Southworth)
Adrienne E. Southworth

Organizations

- Kentucky Liberty Caucus (co-endorsement with Reed)
- Kentucky Right to Life Victory PAC (co-endorsement with Reed)
- Make Liberty Win PAC
- NRA Political Victory Fund

==== Fundraising ====
Final campaign finance reports
Candidate	Raised	Spent	Cash on hand
Ed Gallrein	$244,079.00	$244,079.00	$0.00
Aaron Reed	$148,701.03	$148,701.03	$0.00
Adrienne E. Southworth	$69,501.48	$69,501.48	$0.00
Source: Kentucky Registry of Election Finance

==== Results ====
Results by precinct: Reed: 30–40%; 40–50%; 50–60%; Gallrein: 30–40%; 40–50%; 50–60%; 60–70%; 70–80%; 80–90%; Southworth: 30–40%; 40–50%; Tie: 30–40%

Republican primary results
Party	Candidate	Votes	%
Republican	Aaron Reed	4,826	39.2
Republican	Ed Gallrein	4,708	38.3
Republican	Adrienne E. Southworth (incumbent)	2,747	22.4
Total votes		12,281	100.0

=== General election ===
==== Endorsements ====
Aaron Reed (R)

Organizations

- Kentucky Fraternal Order of Police
- Kentucky Right to Life Victory PAC
- NRA Political Victory Fund

==== Fundraising ====
Campaign finance reports as of October 27, 2024
Candidate	Raised	Spent	Cash on hand
Rhonda Davis (D)	$2,136.49	$2,111.49	$25.00
Aaron Reed (R)	$61,323.98	$59,64.15	$55,359.83
Source: Kentucky Registry of Election Finance

==== Results ====
2024 Kentucky Senate 7th district election
Party	Candidate	Votes	%
Republican	Aaron Reed	40,538	68.0
Democratic	Rhonda Davis	19,112	32.0
Total votes		59,650	100.0
Republican hold			

== District 9 ==
=== Democratic primary ===
==== Candidates ====
===== Nominee =====
- Karen M. Pennington

=== Republican primary ===
==== Candidates ====
===== Nominee =====
- David P. Givens, incumbent senator and president pro tempore of the senate

=== General election ===
==== Endorsements ====
Karen M. Pennington (D)

Organizations

- The Fairness Campaign
- Kentucky AFL-CIO
- United Auto Workers
David P. Givens (R)

Organizations

- Kentucky Chamber of Commerce
- Kentucky Fraternal Order of Police
- NRA Political Victory Fund

==== Fundraising ====
Campaign finance reports as of October 27, 2024
Candidate	Raised	Spent	Cash on hand
Karen M. Pennington (D)	$0.00	$0.00	$0.00
David P. Givens (R)	$299,012.26	$33,937.03	$265,075.23
Source: Kentucky Registry of Election Finance

==== Results ====
2024 Kentucky Senate 9th district election
Party	Candidate	Votes	%
Republican	David P. Givens (incumbent)	37,580	75.3
Democratic	Karen M. Pennington	12,303	24.7
Total votes		49,883	100.0
Republican hold			

== District 11 ==
Incumbent senator John Schickel retired.

=== Republican primary ===
==== Candidates ====
===== Nominee =====
- Steve Rawlings, representative from the 66th district (2023–2025)

===== Eliminated in primary =====
- Duane Froelicher, member of the Florence city council (2015–2021) and candidate for mayor of Florence in 2022

==== Endorsements ====
Duane Froelicher

Organizations

- Kentucky Chamber of Commerce
Steve Rawlings

Organizations

- Kentucky Liberty Caucus
- Kentucky Right to Life Victory PAC
- Make Liberty Win PAC
- Northern Kentucky Right to Life PAC
- NRA Political Victory Fund

==== Fundraising ====
Campaign finance reports as of May 8, 2024
Candidate	Raised	Spent	Cash on hand
Duane Froelicher	$35,686.76	$35,686.76	$0.00
Steve Rawlings	$53,450.54	$53,450.54	$0.00
Source: Kentucky Registry of Election Finance

==== Results ====
Results by precinct: Rawlings: 50–60%; 60–70%; 70–80%; 80–90%

Republican primary results
Party	Candidate	Votes	%
Republican	Steve Rawlings	7,482	77.4
Republican	Duane Froelicher	2,179	22.6
Total votes		9,661	100.0

=== General election ===
==== Results ====
2024 Kentucky Senate 11th district election
Party	Candidate	Votes	%
Republican	Steve Rawlings	Unopposed	
Total votes		42,770	100.0
Republican hold			

== District 13 ==
=== Democratic primary ===
==== Candidates ====
===== Nominee =====
- Reggie Thomas, incumbent senator

=== General election ===
==== Results ====
2024 Kentucky Senate 13th district election
Party	Candidate	Votes	%
Democratic	Reggie Thomas (incumbent)	Unopposed	
Total votes		34,195	100.0
Democratic hold			

== District 15 ==
=== Republican primary ===
==== Candidates ====
===== Nominee =====
- Rick Girdler, incumbent senator

=== General election ===
==== Results ====
2024 Kentucky Senate 15th district election
Party	Candidate	Votes	%
Republican	Rick Girdler (incumbent)	Unopposed	
Total votes		47,378	100.0
Republican hold			

== District 17 ==
Incumbent senator and senate majority leader Damon Thayer retired.

=== Democratic primary ===
==== Candidates ====
===== Nominee =====
- Kiana Fields

=== Republican primary ===
==== Candidates ====
===== Nominee =====
- Matt Nunn, veteran and Toyota Tsusho vice president

===== Eliminated in primary =====
- Julia Jaddock, church employee

==== Endorsements ====
Julia Jaddock

Organizations

- Kentucky Liberty Caucus
- Northern Kentucky Right to Life PAC
Matt Nunn

Organizations

- Kentucky Chamber of Commerce
- Kentucky Right to Life Victory PAC
- NRA Political Victory Fund

==== Fundraising ====
Campaign finance reports as of May 8, 2024
Candidate	Raised	Spent	Cash on hand
Julia Jaddock	$23,950.70	$23,950.70	$0.00
Matt Nunn	$148,398.68	$148,398.68	$0.00
Source: Kentucky Registry of Election Finance

==== Results ====
Republican primary results
Party	Candidate	Votes	%
Republican	Matt Nunn	6,291	67.0
Republican	Julia Jaddock	3,099	33.0
Total votes		9,390	100.0

=== General election ===
==== Endorsements ====
Kiana Fields (D)

Organizations

- Emerge Kentucky
- The Fairness Campaign
- Kentuckians for the Commonwealth New Power PAC
- Kentucky AFL-CIO
- United Auto Workers
Matt Nunn (R)

Organizations

- Kentucky Chamber of Commerce
- Kentucky Fraternal Order of Police
- Kentucky Right to Life Victory PAC
- NRA Political Victory Fund

==== Fundraising ====
Campaign finance reports as of October 27, 2024
Candidate	Raised	Spent	Cash on hand
Kiana Fields (D)	$41,699.42	$27,467.39	$14,232.03
Matt Nunn (R)	$139,488.01	$94,049.87	$45,438.14
Source: Kentucky Registry of Election Finance

==== Results ====
2024 Kentucky Senate 17th district election
Party	Candidate	Votes	%
Republican	Matt Nunn	42,430	69.1
Democratic	Kiana Fields	19,015	30.9
Total votes		61,445	100.0
Republican hold			

== District 19 ==
=== Democratic primary ===
==== Candidates ====
===== Nominee =====
- Cassie Chambers Armstrong, incumbent senator

=== General election ===
==== Results ====
2024 Kentucky Senate 19th district election
Party	Candidate	Votes	%
Democratic	Cassie Chambers Armstrong (incumbent)	Unopposed	
Total votes		41,206	100.0
Democratic hold			

== District 21 ==
=== Republican primary ===
==== Candidates ====
===== Nominee =====
- Brandon J. Storm, incumbent senator

=== General election ===
==== Results ====
2024 Kentucky Senate 21st district election
Party	Candidate	Votes	%
Republican	Brandon J. Storm (incumbent)	Unopposed	
Total votes		46,323	100.0
Republican hold			

== District 23 ==
=== Democratic primary ===
==== Candidates ====
===== Nominee =====
- Jennifer Sierra, artist and author, and candidate for Dayton city council in 2014

=== Republican primary ===
==== Candidates ====
===== Nominee =====
- Chris McDaniel, incumbent senator

=== General election ===
==== Endorsements ====
Jennifer Sierra (D)

Statewide officials

- Andy Beshear, governor of Kentucky (2019–present)

Organizations

- The Fairness Campaign
- Kentucky AFL-CIO
- Kentucky Sierra Club
- United Auto Workers
- United Mine Workers of America
Chris McDaniel (R)

Organizations

- Americans for Prosperity-Kentucky
- Kentucky Chamber of Commerce
- Kentucky Fraternal Order of Police
- NRA Political Victory Fund
Declined to endorse

Organizations

- Northern Kentucky Right to Life PAC

==== Fundraising ====
Campaign finance reports as of October 27, 2024
Candidate	Raised	Spent	Cash on hand
Jennifer Sierra (D)	$57,890.01	$37,990.97	$19,899.04
Chris McDaniel (R)	$360,508.69	$120,647.86	$239,860.83
Source: Kentucky Registry of Election Finance

==== Results ====
2024 Kentucky Senate 23rd district election
Party	Candidate	Votes	%
Republican	Chris McDaniel (incumbent)	34,101	60.0
Democratic	Jennifer Sierra	22,731	40.0
Total votes		56,832	100.0
Republican hold			

== District 25 ==
=== Republican primary ===
==== Candidates ====
===== Nominee =====
- Robert Stivers, incumbent senator and president of the senate

=== General election ===
==== Results ====
2024 Kentucky Senate 25th district election
Party	Candidate	Votes	%
Republican	Robert Stivers (incumbent)	Unopposed	
Total votes		41,174	100.0
Republican hold			

== District 27 ==
=== Democratic primary ===
==== Candidates ====
===== Nominee =====
- Molly Gene Crain, farmer and consultant

=== Republican primary ===
==== Candidates ====
===== Nominee =====
- Steve West, incumbent senator

=== General election ===
==== Endorsements ====
Molly Gene Crain (D)

Statewide officials

- Andy Beshear, governor of Kentucky (2019–present)

Newspapers

- The Lexington Herald-Leader

Organizations

- Emerge Kentucky
- Kentuckians for the Commonwealth New Power PAC
- Kentucky AFL-CIO
- Planned Parenthood Action Fund
- Run for Something
- United Auto Workers
- United Mine Workers of America
Steve West (R)

Organizations

- Kentucky Chamber of Commerce
- Kentucky Fraternal Order of Police
- Kentucky Right to Life Victory PAC
- NRA Political Victory Fund

==== Fundraising ====
Campaign finance reports as of October 27, 2024
Candidate	Raised	Spent	Cash on hand
Molly Gene Crain (D)	$149,114.09	$123,989.54	$25,124.55
Steve West (R)	$136,391.18	$102,608.75	$33,782.43
Source: Kentucky Registry of Election Finance

==== Results ====
2024 Kentucky Senate 27th district election
Party	Candidate	Votes	%
Republican	Steve West (incumbent)	34,870	62.8
Democratic	Molly Gene Crain	20,682	37.2
Total votes		55,552	100.0
Republican hold			

== District 29 ==
At the time ballots were printed for the election, two candidates were in the race: Republican Johnnie L. Turner and independent David Suhr. However, before the election was held, Suhr withdrew from the race and Turner died, meaning neither of their votes would be counted. The winner of the race was a write-in candidate, Republican Scott Madon.

=== Republican primary ===
==== Candidates ====
===== Nominee =====
- Johnnie L. Turner, senator from the 29th district (2021–2024) (died October 22, 2024, remained on ballot)

===== Eliminated in primary =====
- Shawn Andrew Gilley, member of the Letcher County Board of Education (2019–present)
- Randy Thompson, Judge/Executive of Knott County (2005–2013) (Note: Thompson was appointed to the office in 2005 by governor Ernie Fletcher and was removed from office in 2013 after being convicted of conspiracy to buy votes.)

===== Withdrawn =====
- Les Stapleton, mayor of Prestonsburg (2015–2024) (withdrew January 5, 2024)

==== Endorsements ====
Randy Thompson

Organizations

- Kentucky Right to Life Victory PAC
Johnnie L. Turner

Organizations

- Kentucky AFL-CIO
- NRA Political Victory Fund

==== Fundraising ====
Campaign finance reports as of May 8, 2024
Candidate	Raised	Spent	Cash on hand
Shawn Andrew Gilley	$900.00	$869.14	$30.86
Randy Thompson	$24,600.00	$24,600.00	$0.00
Johnnie L. Turner	$81,033.90	$81,033.90	$0.00
Source: Kentucky Registry of Election Finance

==== Results ====
Results by precinct: Turner: 40–50%; 50–60%; 60–70%; 70–80%; 80–90%; 90–100%; Thompson: 30–40%; 40–50%; 50–60%; 60–70%; 70–80%; 80–90%; 90–100%; Tie: 30–40%; 40–50%; 50%

Republican primary results
Party	Candidate	Votes	%
Republican	Johnnie L. Turner (incumbent)	4,305	61.7
Republican	Randy Thompson	2,181	31.3
Republican	Shawn Andrew Gilley	491	7.0
Total votes		6,977	100.0

=== Independent candidates ===
==== Withdrawn ====
- David Suhr (withdrew October 15, 2024, remained on ballot)

=== Write-in candidates ===
==== Democratic ====
- Craig E. Blackburn
- Valerie Ison Horn, volunteer and activist
- Justin Wade Noble, attorney
- Paul Williams, deputy sheriff

==== Republican ====
- John Clem, candidate for Harlan County Clerk in 2018
- Willie Crase, candidate for Judge/Executive of Floyd County in 2022
- Scott Madon, mayor of Pineville (2015–2025)
- Andrew Thomas Saylor
- James Tyler Ward II, attorney

==== Independent ====
- James Richard Tanner Hesterberg, attorney and former journalist

==== Unknown ====
- Leonard Hendrickson, candidate for Judge/Executive of Knott County in 2018

=== General election ===
==== Endorsements ====
Scott Madon

U.S. representatives

- Hal Rogers, U.S. representative from KY-05 (1981–present)

State legislators

- Robert Stivers, state senator from the 25th district (1997–present) and president of the Senate (2013–present)
- Phillip Wheeler, state senator from the 31st district (2019–present)
Justin Wade Noble

Statewide officials

- Rocky Adkins, advisor to Beshear (2019–present) and state representative from the 99th district (1987–2019)
- Andy Beshear, governor of Kentucky (2019–present)
- Jacqueline Coleman, lieutenant governor of Kentucky (2019–present)

==== Results ====
2024 Kentucky Senate 29th district election
Party	Candidate	Votes	%
Write-in	Scott Madon	6,825	35.2
Write-in	Willie Crase	2,892	14.9
Write-in	James Tyler Ward II	2,006	10.3
Write-in	James Richard Tanner Hesterberg	1,908	9.8
Write-in	Justin Wade Noble	1,844	9.5
Write-in	Leonard Hendrickson	1,266	6.5
Write-in	Valerie Ison Horn	1,238	6.4
Write-in	Craig E. Blackburn	722	3.7
Write-in	John Clem	443	2.3
Write-in	Paul Williams	152	0.8
Write-in	Andrew Thomas Saylor	106	0.5
Total votes		19,402	100.0
Republican hold			

== District 31 ==
=== Republican primary ===
==== Candidates ====
===== Nominee =====
- C. Phillip Wheeler Jr., incumbent senator

=== General election ===
==== Results ====
2024 Kentucky Senate 31st district election
Party	Candidate	Votes	%
Republican	C. Phillip Wheeler Jr. (incumbent)	Unopposed	
Total votes		37,422	100.0
Republican hold			

== District 33 ==
=== Democratic primary ===
==== Candidates ====
===== Nominee =====
- Gerald A. Neal, incumbent senator and senate minority leader

===== Eliminated in primary =====
- Michael W. Churchill Jr.
- Attica Woodson Scott, representative from the 41st district (2017–2023) and candidate for Kentucky's 3rd congressional district in 2022

==== Endorsements ====
Gerald A. Neal

Statewide officials

- Andy Beshear, governor of Kentucky (2019–present)

Local officials

- Craig Greenberg, mayor of Louisville (2023–present)

Organizations

- The Fairness Campaign (co-endorsement with Scott)
- Kentucky AFL-CIO
- Kentucky Chamber of Commerce
- Kentucky Educators' PAC
Attica Woodson Scott

Local officials

- Jecorey Arthur, member of the Louisville Metro Council (2021–present)

Organizations

- Emerge Kentucky
- The Fairness Campaign (co-endorsement with Neal)
- Kentuckians for the Commonwealth New Power PAC
- Louisville DSA

==== Fundraising ====
Campaign finance reports as of May 8, 2024
Candidate	Raised	Spent	Cash on hand
Michael W. Churchill Jr.	$2,305.00	$2,305.00	$0.00
Gerald A. Neal	$135,403.88	$115,449.06	$19,954.82
Attica Woodson Scott	$31,952.19	$31,952.19	$0.00
Source: Kentucky Registry of Election Finance

==== Results ====
Results by precinct: Neal: 30–40%; 40–50%; 50–60%; 60–70%; 70–80%; Scott: 40–50%; 50–60%; 60–70%; Tie: 30–40%; 40–50%

Democratic primary results
Party	Candidate	Votes	%
Democratic	Gerald A. Neal (incumbent)	4,854	55.3
Democratic	Attica Woodson Scott	3,460	39.4
Democratic	Michael W. Churchill Jr.	462	5.3
Total votes		8,776	100.0

=== General election ===
==== Results ====
2024 Kentucky Senate 33rd district election
Party	Candidate	Votes	%
Democratic	Gerald A. Neal (incumbent)	Unopposed	
Total votes		31,265	100.0
Democratic hold			

== District 35 ==
Incumbent senator Denise Harper Angel retired.

=== Democratic primary ===
==== Candidates ====
===== Nominee =====
- Keturah J. Herron, representative from the 42nd district (2022–2025)

=== General election ===
==== Results ====
2024 Kentucky Senate 35th district election
Party	Candidate	Votes	%
Democratic	Keturah J. Herron	Unopposed	
Total votes		24,717	100.0
Democratic hold			

== District 37 ==
2024 Kentucky Senate 37th district election
- November 5, 2024
Nominee	David Yates	Calvin Leach
Party	Democratic	Republican
Popular vote	25,124	16,460
Percentage	60.4%	39.6%
- Precinct results Yates: 50-60% 60-70% 70-80% 80-90% Leach: 50-60% 60-70%
Senator before election
David Yates
Democratic
Elected Senator
David Yates
Democratic

=== Democratic primary ===
==== Candidates ====
===== Nominee =====
- David Yates, incumbent senator and senate minority whip

=== Republican primary ===
==== Candidates ====
===== Nominee =====
- Calvin Leach, master's student and member of the United States Army Reserve

=== General election ===
==== Endorsements ====
David Yates (D)

Organizations

- The Fairness Campaign
- Kentucky AFL-CIO
- Kentucky Fraternal Order of Police
- United Auto Workers
Calvin Leach (R)

Organizations

- Kentucky Right to Life Victory PAC
Declined to endorse

Organizations

- NRA Political Victory Fund

==== Fundraising ====
Campaign finance reports as of October 27, 2024
Candidate	Raised	Spent	Cash on hand
David Yates (D)	$142,668.06	$95,181.11	$47,486.95
Calvin Leach (R)	$0.00	$0.00	$0.00
Source: Kentucky Registry of Election Finance

==== Results ====
2024 Kentucky Senate 37th district election
Party	Candidate	Votes	%
Democratic	David Yates (incumbent)	25,124	60.4
Republican	Calvin Leach	16,460	39.6
Total votes		41,584	100.0
Democratic hold			

== See also ==
- 2024 Kentucky elections
  - 2024 Kentucky House of Representatives election
  - 2024 United States House of Representatives elections in Kentucky
