= Kentucky's 35th Senate district =

American legislative district

Kentucky's 35th State Senate district
Senator
| Keturah J. Herron; D–Louisville |
since January 1, 2025
- Registration: 62.9% Democratic; 24.6% Republican; 11.8% No party preference
- Demographics: 49.7% White; 26.5% Black; 17.5% Hispanic; 1.9% Asian; 0.1% Native American; 0.5% Other; 3.9% Multiracial
- Population (2023): 111,805
- Registered voters (2025): 74,681

Kentucky's 35th Senatorial district is one of 38 districts in the Kentucky Senate. It comprises part of Jefferson County. It has been represented by Keturah J. Herron (D–Louisville) since 2025. As of 2023, the district had a population of 111,805.

== Voter registration ==
On January 1, 2025, the district had 74,681 registered voters, who were registered with the following parties.

| Party | Registration | |
| Party | Voters | % |
|---|---|---|
| Democratic | 46,976 | 62.90 |
| Republican | 18,345 | 24.56 |
| Independent | 3,633 | 4.86 |
| Libertarian | 382 | 0.51 |
| Green | 102 | 0.14 |
| Socialist Workers | 42 | 0.06 |
| Constitution | 28 | 0.04 |
| Reform | 7 | 0.01 |
| "Other" | 5,166 | 6.92 |
| Total | 74,681 | 100.00 |
Source: Kentucky State Board of Elections

== Election results from statewide races ==
=== 2022 – present ===
| Year | Office | Results (Note: Figures presented in this table are calculated by summing precinct election results published by the Kentucky State Board of Elections, using precinct data that list each precinct's senatorial district.) |
|---|---|---|
| 2022 | Senator | Booker 67.8 - 32.2% |
| 2022 | Amendment 1 | No 71.7 - 28.3% |
| 2022 | Amendment 2 | No 76.3 - 23.7% |
| 2023 | Governor | Beshear 78.2 - 21.8% |
| 2023 | Secretary of State | Wheatley 68.9 - 31.0% |
| 2023 | Attorney General | Stevenson 71.2 - 28.8% |
| 2023 | Auditor of Public Accounts | Reeder 69.6 - 30.4% |
| 2023 | State Treasurer | Bowman 72.2 - 27.8% |
| 2023 | Commissioner of Agriculture | Enlow 70.8 - 29.2% |
| 2024 | President | Harris 62.7 - 35.2% |
| 2024 | Amendment 1 | No 53.6 - 46.4% |
| 2024 | Amendment 2 | No 72.7 - 27.3% |

== List of members representing the district ==
| Member | Party | Years | Electoral history | District location |
|---|---|---|---|---|
| Martin J. Duffy (Louisville) | Democratic | January 1, 1952 – January 1, 1968 | Elected in 1951. Reelected in 1955. Reelected in 1959. Reelected in 1963. Retired. | 1944–1964; Jefferson County (part). |
| Martin J. Duffy (Louisville) | Democratic | January 1, 1952 – January 1, 1968 | Elected in 1951. Reelected in 1955. Reelected in 1959. Reelected in 1963. Retired. | 1964–1972 |
| Romano Mazzoli (Louisville) | Democratic | January 1, 1968 – December 16, 1970 | Elected in 1967. Resigned after being elected to Kentucky's 3rd congressional district. | 1964–1972 |
| Lacey Smith (Louisville) | Democratic | January 1971 – January 1, 1976 | Elected to finish Mazzoli's term. Reelected in 1971. Retired. | 1964–1972 |
| Lacey Smith (Louisville) | Democratic | January 1971 – January 1, 1976 | Elected to finish Mazzoli's term. Reelected in 1971. Retired. | 1972–1974 |
| Lacey Smith (Louisville) | Democratic | January 1971 – January 1, 1976 | Elected to finish Mazzoli's term. Reelected in 1971. Retired. | 1974–1984 |
| David Karem (Louisville) | Democratic | January 1, 1976 – January 1, 2005 | Elected in 1975. Reelected in 1979. Reelected in 1983. Reelected in 1988. Reelected in 1992. Reelected in 1996. Reelected in 2000. Retired. | 1974–1984 |
| David Karem (Louisville) | Democratic | January 1, 1976 – January 1, 2005 | Elected in 1975. Reelected in 1979. Reelected in 1983. Reelected in 1988. Reelected in 1992. Reelected in 1996. Reelected in 2000. Retired. | 1984–1993; Jefferson County (part). |
| David Karem (Louisville) | Democratic | January 1, 1976 – January 1, 2005 | Elected in 1975. Reelected in 1979. Reelected in 1983. Reelected in 1988. Reelected in 1992. Reelected in 1996. Reelected in 2000. Retired. | 1993–1997 |
| David Karem (Louisville) | Democratic | January 1, 1976 – January 1, 2005 | Elected in 1975. Reelected in 1979. Reelected in 1983. Reelected in 1988. Reelected in 1992. Reelected in 1996. Reelected in 2000. Retired. | 1997–2003 |
| David Karem (Louisville) | Democratic | January 1, 1976 – January 1, 2005 | Elected in 1975. Reelected in 1979. Reelected in 1983. Reelected in 1988. Reelected in 1992. Reelected in 1996. Reelected in 2000. Retired. | 2003–2015 |
| Denise Harper Angel (Louisville) | Democratic | January 1, 2005 – January 1, 2025 | Elected in 2004. Reelected in 2008. Reelected in 2012. Reelected in 2016. Reelected in 2020. Retired. | 2003–2015 |
| Denise Harper Angel (Louisville) | Democratic | January 1, 2005 – January 1, 2025 | Elected in 2004. Reelected in 2008. Reelected in 2012. Reelected in 2016. Reelected in 2020. Retired. | 2015–2023 |
| Denise Harper Angel (Louisville) | Democratic | January 1, 2005 – January 1, 2025 | Elected in 2004. Reelected in 2008. Reelected in 2012. Reelected in 2016. Reelected in 2020. Retired. | 2023–present |
| Keturah J. Herron (Louisville) | Democratic | January 1, 2025 – present | Elected in 2024. | 2023–present |
