= 2020 Kentucky Senate election =

- November 3, 2020

19 out of 38 seats in the Kentucky Senate 20 seats needed for a majority
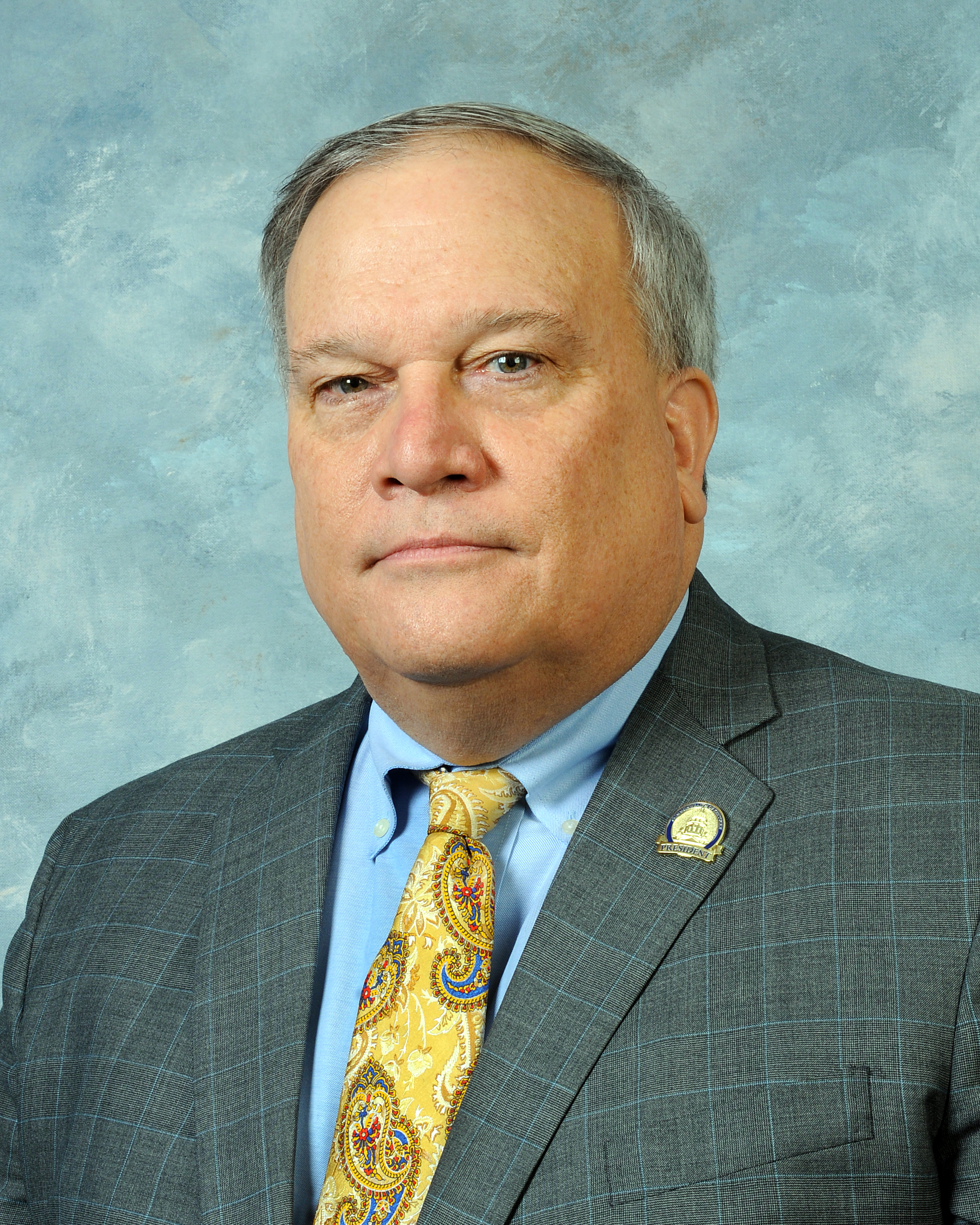

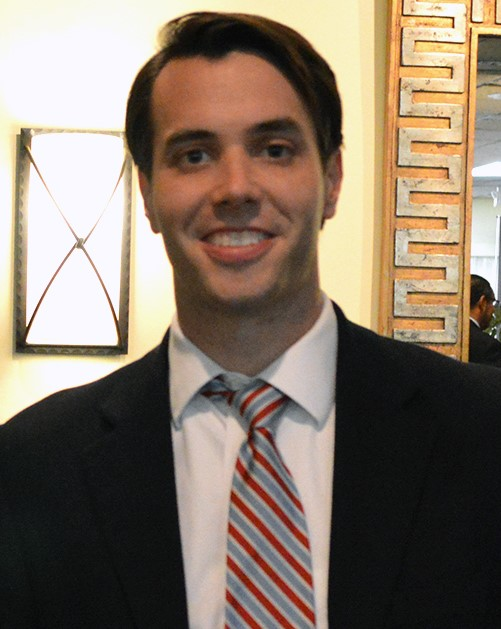
	Majority party	Minority party
Leader	Robert Stivers	Morgan McGarvey
Party	Republican	Democratic
Leader since	January 8, 2013	January 8, 2019
Leader's seat	25th – Manchester	19th – Louisville
Last election	28	10
Seats won	30	8
Seat change	▲2	▼2
Seats up	12	7
Races won	14	5
- Republican hold Republican gain Democratic hold No election 50–60% 60–70% 70–80% 80–90% >90% >90%
Senate President before election
Robert Stivers
Republican
Elected Senate President
Robert Stivers
Republican

The 2020 Kentucky Senate election was held on November 3, 2020. The Republican and Democratic primary elections were held on June 23. Half of the senate seats (all odd-numbered seats) were up for election. Republicans increased their majority in the chamber, gaining two seats.

A numbered map of the senate districts at the time can be viewed here.

== Overview ==
Party	Candidates		Votes	%	Seats			
Party	Opposed	Unopposed	Votes	%	Before	Won	After	+/−
Republican	11	3	532,205	59.01	28	14	30	+2
Democratic	9	4	340,042	37.70	10	5	8	-2
Libertarian	3	0	20,927	2.32	0	0	0	-
Independent	2	0	8,423	0.93	0	0	0	-
Write-in	3	0	268	0.03	0	0	0	-
Total	28	7	901,865	100.00	38	19	38	±0
Source: Kentucky Secretary of State

== Retiring incumbents ==
A total of three senators (two Democrats and one Republican) retired, none of whom ran for other offices.

=== Democratic ===
1. 7th: Julian M. Carroll (Frankfort): Retired
2. 37th: Perry B. Clark (Louisville): Retired

=== Republican ===
1. 1st: Stan Humphries (Cadiz): Retired

== Incumbents defeated ==
One incumbent lost renomination in the primary election, and one incumbent lost reelection in the general election.

=== In the primary election ===
==== Republicans ====
One Republican lost renomination.

1. 21st: Albert Robinson (first elected in 1994) lost renomination to Brandon J. Storm, who won the general election.

=== In the general election ===
==== Democrats ====
One Democrat lost reelection to a Republican.

1. 29th: Johnny Ray Turner (first elected in 2000) lost to Johnnie L. Turner.

== Summary by district ==
Certified results by the Kentucky Secretary of State are available online for the primary election and general election.

† – Incumbent not seeking re-election

District	Incumbent	Party	Elected	Party
1	Stan Humphries†	Rep	Jason G. Howell	Rep
3	Whitney H. Westerfield	Rep	Whitney H. Westerfield	Rep
5	Stephen L. Meredith	Rep	Stephen L. Meredith	Rep
7	Julian M. Carroll†	Dem	Adrienne E. Southworth	Rep
9	David P. Givens	Rep	David P. Givens	Rep
11	John Schickel	Rep	John Schickel	Rep
13	Reginald Thomas	Dem	Reginald Thomas	Dem
15	Rick Girdler	Rep	Rick Girdler	Rep
17	Damon Thayer	Rep	Damon Thayer	Rep
19	Morgan McGarvey	Dem	Morgan McGarvey	Dem
21	Albert Robinson	Rep	Brandon Jackson Storm	Rep
23	Chris McDaniel	Rep	Chris McDaniel	Rep
25	Robert Stivers	Rep	Robert Stivers	Rep
27	Steve West	Rep	Steve West	Rep
29	Johnny Ray Turner	Dem	Johnnie L. Turner	Rep
31	Phillip Wheeler	Rep	Phillip Wheeler	Rep
33	Gerald A. Neal	Dem	Gerald A. Neal	Dem
35	Denise Harper Angel	Dem	Denise Harper Angel	Dem
37	Perry B. Clark†	Dem	David Yates	Dem

== Crossover seats ==
=== Democratic ===
Three districts voted for Donald Trump in 2016 but had Democratic incumbents:

District		Incumbent		
#	Trump margin of victory in 2016	Member	Party	Incumbent margin of victory in 2016
7	R+24.18	Julian M. Carroll	Democratic	Unopposed
29	R+58.30	Johnny Ray Turner	Democratic	Unopposed
37	R+5.54	Perry B. Clark	Democratic	Unopposed

=== Republican ===
None.

== Closest races ==
Seats where the margin of victory was under 10%:

1. District 29, 6.80% (gain)
2. District 7, 9.48% (gain)

== Predictions ==
Source	Ranking	As of
The Cook Political Report	Solid R	October 21, 2020

== Special elections ==
=== District 31 special ===
Results by county: Wheeler: 50–60%; 70–80%; Pugh: 50–60%; 70–80%

Phillip Wheeler was elected in March 2019 following the resignation of Ray Jones II.

2019 Kentucky Senate 31st district special election
Party	Candidate	Votes	%
Republican	Phillip Wheeler	6,188	52.3
Democratic	Darrell Pugh	5,649	47.7
Total votes		11,837	100.0
Republican gain from Democratic			

=== District 38 special ===
Michael J. Nemes was elected in January 2020 following the resignation of Dan Seum.

2020 Kentucky Senate 38th district special election
Party	Candidate	Votes	%
Republican	Michael J. Nemes	8,637	63.6
Democratic	Andrew Bailey	4,943	36.4
Total votes		13,580	100.0
Republican hold			

=== District 26 special ===
Karen Berg was elected in June 2020 following the resignation of Ernie Harris.

2020 Kentucky Senate 26th district special election
Party	Candidate	Votes	%
Democratic	Karen Berg	24,771	57.0
Republican	Bill Ferko	18,705	43.0
Total votes		43,476	100.0
Democratic gain from Republican			

== District 1 ==
Incumbent senator Stan Humphries did not seek reelection. He was succeeded by Republican Jason G. Howell.

=== Republican primary ===
==== Candidates ====
===== Nominee =====
- Jason G. Howell

=== General election ===
==== Results ====
2020 Kentucky Senate 1st district election
Party	Candidate	Votes	%
Republican	Jason G. Howell	Unopposed	
Total votes		40,128	100.0
Republican hold			

== District 3 ==
Incumbent senator Whitney H. Westerfield won reelection, defeating Libertarian candidate Amanda Billings.

=== Republican primary ===
==== Candidates ====
===== Nominee =====
- Whitney H. Westerfield, incumbent senator

=== Third-party candidates ===
==== Libertarian party ====
- Amanda Billings

=== General election ===
==== Results ====
2020 Kentucky Senate 3rd district election
Party	Candidate	Votes	%
Republican	Whitney H. Westerfield (incumbent)	29,640	78.4
Libertarian	Amanda Billings	8,157	21.6
Total votes		37,797	100.0
Republican hold			

== District 5 ==
Incumbent senator Stephen L. Meredith won reelection, defeating Independent and Libertarian candidates.

=== Republican primary ===
==== Candidates ====
===== Nominee =====
- Stephen L. Meredith, incumbent senator

=== Independent candidates ===
- John Whipple

=== Third-party candidates ===
==== Libertarian party ====
- Guy M. Miller

=== General election ===
==== Results ====
2020 Kentucky Senate 5th district election
Party	Candidate	Votes	%
Republican	Stephen L. Meredith (incumbent)	43,385	82.0
Independent	John Whipple	5,724	10.8
Libertarian	Guy M. Miller	3,781	7.1
Total votes		52,890	100.0
Republican hold			

== District 7 ==
Incumbent senator Julian M. Carroll did not seek reelection. He was succeeded by Republican Adrienne E. Southworth.

=== Democratic primary ===
==== Candidates ====
===== Nominee =====
- Joe Graviss, representative from the 56th district (2019–2021)

=== Republican primary ===
==== Candidates ====
===== Nominee =====
- Adrienne E. Southworth

===== Eliminated in primary =====
- Cleaver Kirk Crawford
- Katie Howard
- Calen Studler
- Linda Thompson

==== Results ====
Republican primary results
Party	Candidate	Votes	%
Republican	Adrienne E. Southworth	3,701	31.1
Republican	Katie Howard	3,157	26.5
Republican	Calen Studler	2,697	22.7
Republican	Linda Thompson	1,952	16.4
Republican	Cleaver Kirk Crawford	390	3.3
Total votes		11,897	100.0

=== Independent candidates ===
- Ken Carroll

=== General election ===
==== Results ====
2020 Kentucky Senate 7th district election
Party	Candidate	Votes	%
Republican	Adrienne E. Southworth	33,187	52.6
Democratic	Joe Graviss	27,205	43.1
Independent	Ken Carroll	2,699	4.3
Total votes		63,091	100.0
Republican gain from Democratic			

===== Results by county =====
County	Adrienne E. Southworth		Joe Graviss		Ken Carroll		Margin		Total votes
County	#	%	#	%	#	%	#	%	Total votes
Anderson	8,862	68.20	3,744	28.81	388	2.99	5,118	39.39	12,994
Franklin	10,731	41.45	13,562	52.39	1,594	6.16	-2,831	-10.94	25,887
Gallatin	2,650	70.27	931	24.69	190	5.04	1,719	45.58	3,771
Owen	3,994	74.72	1,163	21.76	188	3.52	2,831	52.97	5,345
Woodford	6,950	46.04	7,805	51.71	339	2.25	-855	-5.66	15,094
Total	33,187	52.60	27,205	43.12	2,699	4.28	5,982	9.48	63,091

== District 9 ==
Incumbent senator David P. Givens won reelection, defeating Democratic candidate Brian Pedigo.

=== Democratic primary ===
==== Candidates ====
===== Nominee =====
- Brian Pedigo

=== Republican primary ===
==== Candidates ====
===== Nominee =====
- David P. Givens, incumbent senator

=== General election ===
==== Results ====
2020 Kentucky Senate 9th district election
Party	Candidate	Votes	%
Republican	David P. Givens (incumbent)	41,555	78.5
Democratic	Brian Pedigo	11,356	21.5
Total votes		52,911	100.0
Republican hold			

== District 11 ==
Incumbent senator John Schickel won reelection, defeating Democratic candidate James Fiorelli.

=== Democratic primary ===
==== Candidates ====
===== Nominee =====
- James Fiorelli

=== Republican primary ===
==== Candidates ====
===== Nominee =====
- John Schickel, incumbent senator

=== General election ===
==== Results ====
2020 Kentucky Senate 11th district election
Party	Candidate	Votes	%
Republican	John Schickel (incumbent)	46,463	70.4
Democratic	James Fiorelli	19,496	29.6
Total votes		65,959	100.0
Republican hold			

== District 13 ==
Incumbent senator Reginald Thomas won reelection, defeating write-in candidate Matt E. Miniard.

=== Democratic primary ===
==== Candidates ====
===== Nominee =====
- Reginald Thomas, incumbent senator

=== General election ===
==== Results ====
2020 Kentucky Senate 13th district election
Party	Candidate	Votes	%
Democratic	Reginald Thomas (incumbent)	36,345	99.8
Write-in	Matt E. Miniard	55	0.2
Total votes		36,400	100.0
Democratic hold			

== District 15 ==
Incumbent senator Rick Girdler won reelection, defeating primary election challenger Larry Sears Nichols.

=== Republican primary ===
==== Candidates ====
===== Nominee =====
- Rick Girdler, incumbent senator

===== Eliminated in primary =====
- Larry Sears Nichols

==== Results ====
Republican primary results
Party	Candidate	Votes	%
Republican	Rick Girdler (incumbent)	14,140	78.3
Republican	Larry Sears Nichols	3,923	21.7
Total votes		18,063	100.0

=== General election ===
==== Results ====
2020 Kentucky Senate 15th district election
Party	Candidate	Votes	%
Republican	Rick Girdler (incumbent)	Unopposed	
Total votes		47,098	100.0
Republican hold			

== District 17 ==
Incumbent senator Damon Thayer won reelection, defeating Democratic candidate Jason Stroude.

=== Democratic primary ===
==== Candidates ====
===== Nominee =====
- Jason Stroude

=== Republican primary ===
==== Candidates ====
===== Nominee =====
- Damon Thayer, incumbent senator

=== General election ===
==== Results ====
2020 Kentucky Senate 17th district election
Party	Candidate	Votes	%
Republican	Damon Thayer (incumbent)	44,772	69.3
Democratic	Jason Stroude	19,852	30.7
Total votes		64,624	100.0
Republican hold			

== District 19 ==
Incumbent senator Morgan McGarvey won reelection unopposed.

=== Democratic primary ===
==== Candidates ====
===== Nominee =====
- Morgan McGarvey, incumbent senator

=== General election ===
==== Results ====
2020 Kentucky Senate 19th district election
Party	Candidate	Votes	%
Democratic	Morgan McGarvey (incumbent)	Unopposed	
Total votes		50,867	100.0
Democratic hold			

== District 21 ==
Incumbent Republican senator Albert Robinson was defeated for renomination by Brandon Jackson Storm.

=== Democratic primary ===
==== Candidates ====
===== Nominee =====
- Walter Trebolo III

=== Republican primary ===
==== Candidates ====
===== Nominee =====
- Brandon Jackson Storm

===== Eliminated in primary =====
- Kay Hensley
- Albert Robinson, incumbent senator

==== Results ====
Republican primary results
Party	Candidate	Votes	%
Republican	Brandon Jackson Storm	6,875	38.7
Republican	Albert Robinson (incumbent)	6,131	34.5
Republican	Kay Hensley	4,756	26.8
Total votes		17,762	100.0

=== General election ===
==== Results ====
2020 Kentucky Senate 21st district election
Party	Candidate	Votes	%
Republican	Brandon Jackson Storm	44,099	82.4
Democratic	Walter Trebolo III	9,447	17.6
Total votes		53,546	100.0
Republican hold			

== District 23 ==
Incumbent senator Chris McDaniel won reelection, defeating Democratic candidate Ryan Olexia.

=== Democratic primary ===
==== Candidates ====
===== Nominee =====
- Ryan Olexia

=== Republican primary ===
==== Candidates ====
===== Nominee =====
- Chris McDaniel, incumbent senator

=== General election ===
==== Results ====
2020 Kentucky Senate 23rd district election
Party	Candidate	Votes	%
Republican	Chris McDaniel (incumbent)	32,188	57.7
Democratic	Ryan Olexia	23,623	42.3
Total votes		55,811	100.0
Republican hold			

== District 25 ==
Incumbent senator Robert Stivers won reelection unopposed.

=== Republican primary ===
==== Candidates ====
===== Nominee =====
- Robert Stivers, incumbent senator

=== General election ===
==== Results ====
2020 Kentucky Senate 25th district election
Party	Candidate	Votes	%
Republican	Robert Stivers (incumbent)	Unopposed	
Total votes		37,141	100.0
Republican hold			

== District 27 ==
Incumbent senator Steve West won reelection, defeating Libertarian and write-in candidates.

=== Republican primary ===
==== Candidates ====
===== Nominee =====
- Steve West, incumbent senator

=== Third-party candidates ===
==== Libertarian party ====
- Bryan Shumate Short

=== General election ===
==== Results ====
2020 Kentucky Senate 27th district election
Party	Candidate	Votes	%
Republican	Steve West (incumbent)	38,370	80.7
Libertarian	Bryan Shumate Short	8,989	18.9
Write-in	Yvonne Baldwin	166	0.3
Write-in	Gene Barry Detherage Jr.	47	0.1
Total votes		47,572	100.0
Republican hold			

== District 29 ==
Incumbent senator Johnny Ray Turner was defeated for reelection by Republican Johnnie L. Turner.

=== Democratic primary ===
==== Candidates ====
===== Nominee =====
- Johnny Ray Turner, incumbent senator

=== Republican primary ===
==== Candidates ====
===== Nominee =====
- Johnnie L. Turner, representative from the 88th district (1999–2003)

===== Eliminated in primary =====
- Matthew Wynn

==== Results ====
Republican primary results
Party	Candidate	Votes	%
Republican	Johnnie L. Turner	3,552	69.9
Republican	Matthew Wynn	1,527	30.1
Total votes		5,079	100.0

=== General election ===
==== Results ====
2020 Kentucky Senate 29th district election
Party	Candidate	Votes	%
Republican	Johnnie L. Turner	22,475	53.4
Democratic	Johnny Ray Turner (incumbent)	19,612	46.6
Total votes		42,087	100.0
Republican gain from Democratic			

===== Results by county =====
County	Johnnie L. Turner		Johnny Ray Turner		Margin		Total votes
County	#	%	#	%	#	%	Total votes
Floyd	6,097	37.50	10,161	62.50	-4,064	-25.00	16,258
Harlan	8,431	78.49	2,310	21.51	6,121	56.99	10,741
Knott	3,047	49.62	3,094	50.38	-47	-0.77	6,141
Letcher	4,900	54.77	4,047	45.23	853	9.53	8,947
Total	22,475	53.40	19,612	46.60	2,863	6.80	42,087

== District 31 ==
Incumbent senator Phillip Wheeler won reelection, defeating Democratic candidate Glenn Martin Hammond.

=== Democratic primary ===
==== Candidates ====
===== Nominee =====
- Glenn Martin Hammond

===== Eliminated in primary =====
- Scott Sykes

==== Results ====
Democratic primary results
Party	Candidate	Votes	%
Democratic	Glenn Martin Hammond	5,559	59.2
Democratic	Scott Sykes	3,836	40.8
Total votes		9,395	100.0

=== Republican primary ===
==== Candidates ====
===== Nominee =====
- Phillip Wheeler, incumbent senator

=== General election ===
==== Results ====
2020 Kentucky Senate 31st district election
Party	Candidate	Votes	%
Republican	Phillip Wheeler (incumbent)	31,704	72.2
Democratic	Glenn Martin Hammond	12,196	27.8
Total votes		43,900	100.0
Republican hold			

== District 33 ==
Incumbent senator Gerald A. Neal won reelection unopposed.

=== Democratic primary ===
==== Candidates ====
===== Nominee =====
- Gerald A. Neal, incumbent senator

=== General election ===
==== Results ====
2020 Kentucky Senate 33rd district election
Party	Candidate	Votes	%
Democratic	Gerald A. Neal (incumbent)	Unopposed	
Total votes		38,520	100.0
Democratic hold			

== District 35 ==
Incumbent senator Denise Harper Angel won reelection unopposed.

=== Democratic primary ===
==== Candidates ====
===== Nominee =====
- Denise Harper Angel, incumbent senator

=== General election ===
==== Results ====
2020 Kentucky Senate 35th district election
Party	Candidate	Votes	%
Democratic	Denise Harper Angel (incumbent)	Unopposed	
Total votes		37,358	100.0
Democratic hold			

== District 37 ==
Incumbent senator Perry B. Clark did not seek reelection. He was succeeded by Democrat David Yates.

=== Democratic primary ===
==== Candidates ====
===== Nominee =====
- David Yates

===== Eliminated in primary =====
- Katie Brophy
- Garrett A. Dean
- Di Tran

==== Results ====
Democratic primary results
Party	Candidate	Votes	%
Democratic	David Yates	10,946	67.0
Democratic	Katie Brophy	2,708	16.6
Democratic	Garrett A. Dean	1,345	8.2
Democratic	Di Tran	1,343	8.2
Total votes		16,342	100.0

=== General election ===
==== Results ====
2020 Kentucky Senate 37th district election
Party	Candidate	Votes	%
Democratic	David Yates	Unopposed	
Total votes		34,165	100.0
Democratic hold			

== See also ==
- 2020 Kentucky elections
  - 2020 Kentucky House of Representatives election
  - 2020 United States Senate election in Kentucky
  - 2020 United States House of Representatives elections in Kentucky
