= Kentucky's 7th Senate district =

American legislative district

Kentucky's 7th State Senate district
Senator
| Aaron Reed; R–Shelbyville |
since January 1, 2025
- Registration: 50.4% Republican; 39.5% Democratic; 9.5% No party preference
- Demographics: 81.6% White; 6.8% Black; 6.5% Hispanic; 0.9% Asian; 0.1% Native American; 0.3% Other; 3.9% Multiracial
- Population (2023): 112,440
- Registered voters (2025): 93,713

Kentucky's 7th Senatorial district is one of 38 districts in the Kentucky Senate. The district comprises the counties of Anderson, Henry, and Shelby, as well as part of Jefferson. It has been represented by Aaron Reed (R–Shelbyville) since 2025. As of 2023, the district had a population of 112,440.

From 2005 to 2021, the district was represented by Julian Carroll, who had previously served as governor of Kentucky.

== Voter registration ==
On January 1, 2025, the district had 93,713 registered voters, who were registered with the following parties.

| Party | Registration | |
| Party | Voters | % |
|---|---|---|
| Republican | 47,240 | 50.41 |
| Democratic | 36,971 | 39.45 |
| Independent | 4,552 | 4.86 |
| Libertarian | 453 | 0.48 |
| Green | 58 | 0.06 |
| Constitution | 31 | 0.03 |
| Socialist Workers | 12 | 0.01 |
| Reform | 7 | 0.01 |
| "Other" | 4,389 | 4.68 |
| Total | 93,713 | 100.00 |
Source: Kentucky State Board of Elections

== Election results from statewide races ==
=== 2014 – 2020 ===
| Year | Office | Results (Note: Figures presented in this table are calculated by summing precinct election results published by the Kentucky State Board of Elections, using precinct data that list each precinct's senatorial district.) |
|---|---|---|
| 2014 | Senator | McConnell 50.6 - 45.1% |
| 2015 | Governor | Conway 49.9 - 44.1% |
| 2015 | Secretary of State | Grimes 58.5 - 41.5% |
| 2015 | Attorney General | Beshear 55.1 - 44.9% |
| 2015 | Auditor of Public Accounts | Edelen 57.8 - 42.2% |
| 2015 | State Treasurer | Ball 55.1 - 44.9% |
| 2015 | Commissioner of Agriculture | Quarles 59.7 - 40.3% |
| 2016 | President | Trump 59.4 - 35.2% |
| 2016 | Senator | Paul 51.7 - 48.3% |
| 2019 | Governor | Beshear 52.7 - 45.0% |
| 2019 | Secretary of State | Henry 53.7 - 46.3% |
| 2019 | Attorney General | Cameron 54.9 - 45.1% |
| 2019 | Auditor of Public Accounts | Harmon 53.9 - 42.7% |
| 2019 | State Treasurer | Ball 59.5 - 40.5% |
| 2019 | Commissioner of Agriculture | Quarles 62.4 - 35.0% |
| 2020 | President | Trump 59.8 - 38.3% |
| 2020 | Senator | McConnell 55.9 - 40.0% |
| 2020 | Amendment 1 | Yes 60.7 - 39.3% |
| 2020 | Amendment 2 | No 69.1 - 30.9% |

=== 2022 – present ===
| Year | Office | Results |
|---|---|---|
| 2022 | Senator | Paul 64.4 - 35.5% |
| 2022 | Amendment 1 | No 54.4 - 45.6% |
| 2022 | Amendment 2 | No 53.4 - 46.6% |
| 2023 | Governor | Cameron 50.8 - 49.1% |
| 2023 | Secretary of State | Adams 65.3 - 34.7% |
| 2023 | Attorney General | Coleman 63.0 - 37.0% |
| 2023 | Auditor of Public Accounts | Ball 65.7 - 34.3% |
| 2023 | State Treasurer | Metcalf 61.7 - 38.3% |
| 2023 | Commissioner of Agriculture | Shell 64.3 - 35.7% |
| 2024 | President | Trump 66.3 - 32.0% |
| 2024 | Amendment 1 | Yes 65.0 - 35.0% |
| 2024 | Amendment 2 | No 59.3 - 40.7% |

== List of members representing the district ==
| Member | Party | Years | Electoral history | District location |
|---|---|---|---|---|
| Robert P. Layne (Louisville) | Republican | January 1, 1964 – September 1965 | Elected in 1963. Resigned. | 1964–1972 |
| Richard Chin (Louisville) | Republican | November 1965 – January 1, 1972 | Elected to finish Layne's term. Reelected in 1967. Lost reelection. | 1964–1972 |
| Bill Quinlan (Louisville) | Democratic | January 1, 1972 – January 1, 1993 | Elected in 1971. Reelected in 1975. Reelected in 1979. Reelected in 1983. Reelected in 1988. Retired. | 1972–1974 |
| Bill Quinlan (Louisville) | Democratic | January 1, 1972 – January 1, 1993 | Elected in 1971. Reelected in 1975. Reelected in 1979. Reelected in 1983. Reelected in 1988. Retired. | 1974–1984 |
| Bill Quinlan (Louisville) | Democratic | January 1, 1972 – January 1, 1993 | Elected in 1971. Reelected in 1975. Reelected in 1979. Reelected in 1983. Reelected in 1988. Retired. | 1984–1993; Jefferson County (part). |
| Lindy Casebier (Louisville) | Republican | January 1, 1993 – January 1, 2005 | Elected in 1992. Reelected in 1996. Reelected in 2000. Retired due to redistricting. | 1993–1997 |
| Lindy Casebier (Louisville) | Republican | January 1, 1993 – January 1, 2005 | Elected in 1992. Reelected in 1996. Reelected in 2000. Retired due to redistricting. | 1997–2003 |
| Lindy Casebier (Louisville) | Republican | January 1, 1993 – January 1, 2005 | Elected in 1992. Reelected in 1996. Reelected in 2000. Retired due to redistricting. | 2003–2015 |
| Julian Carroll (Frankfort) | Democratic | January 1, 2005 – January 1, 2021 | Elected in 2004. Reelected in 2008. Reelected in 2012. Reelected in 2016. Retired. | 2003–2015 |
| Julian Carroll (Frankfort) | Democratic | January 1, 2005 – January 1, 2021 | Elected in 2004. Reelected in 2008. Reelected in 2012. Reelected in 2016. Retired. | 2015–2023 |
| Adrienne Southworth (Lawrenceburg) | Republican | January 1, 2021 – January 1, 2025 | Elected in 2020. Lost renomination. | 2015–2023 |
| Adrienne Southworth (Lawrenceburg) | Republican | January 1, 2021 – January 1, 2025 | Elected in 2020. Lost renomination. | 2023–present |
| Aaron Reed (Shelbyville) | Republican | January 1, 2025 – present | Elected in 2024. | 2023–present |
