= Aaron Reed =

American politician

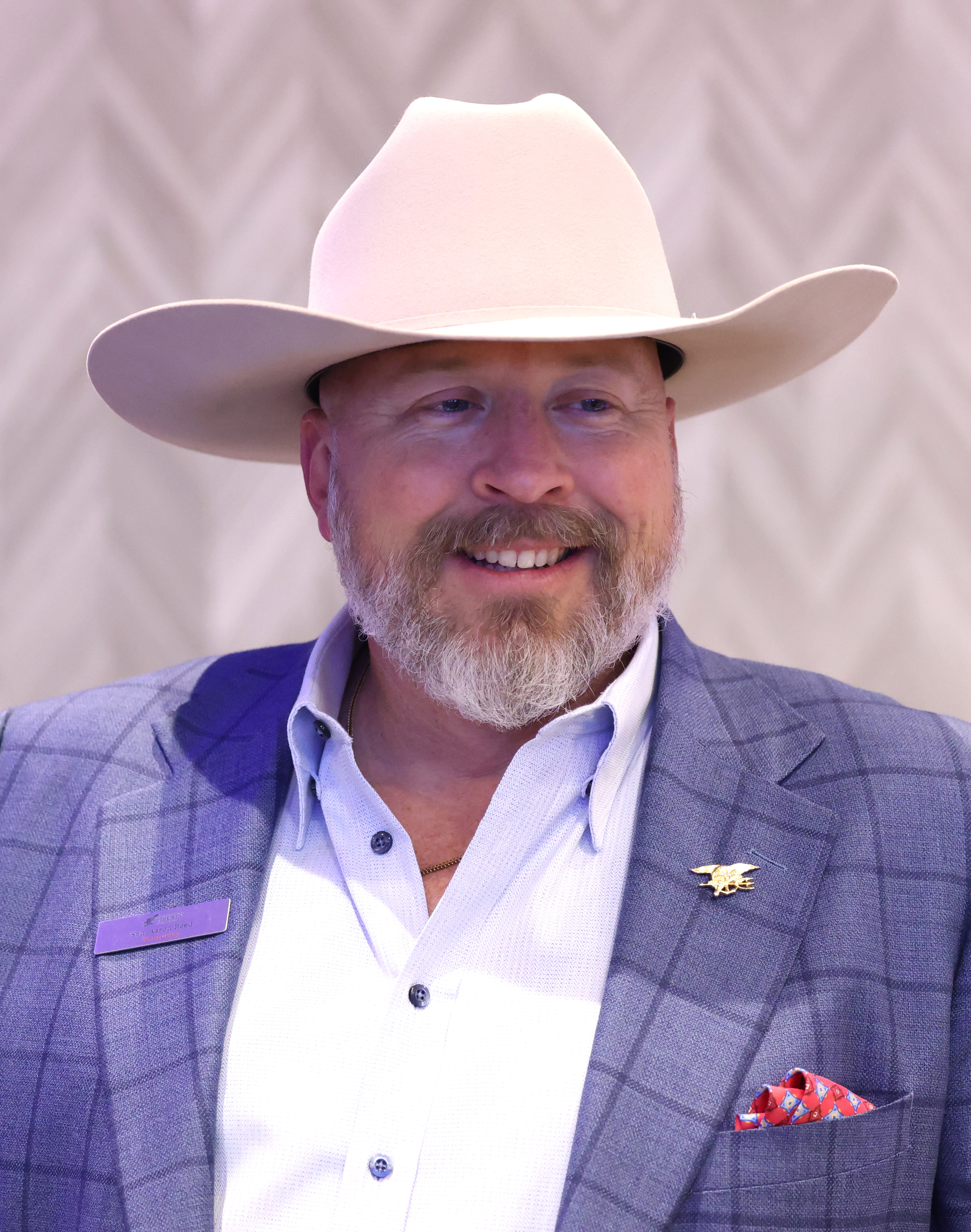
- Reed at Young Americans for Liberty's Hazlitt Summit, 2024

Member of the Kentucky Senate from the 7th district
- Incumbent
- Assumed office January 1, 2025
- Preceded by: Adrienne Southworth

Personal details
- Born: Aaron Charles Reed; July 20, 1977 (age 49) Shelby County, Kentucky, U.S.
- Party: Republican
- Education: Morehead State University (BA)

Military service
- Allegiance: United States
- Branch/service: United States Navy

Aaron Charles Reed (born July 20, 1977) is an American politician. He serves as a Republican member for the 7th district of the Kentucky Senate. His district represents Anderson, Shelby, Spencer counties, and part of Jefferson.

== Life and career ==
Reed is a former United States Navy SEAL.

In May 2024, Reed defeated retired Seal Team Six Captain Ed Gallrein and state Senator Adrienne Southworth in the Republican primary election for the 7th district of the Kentucky Senate. He defeated Gallrein by 118 votes (39.3% to 38.3%). Gallrein requested a recanvass, which reaffirmed Reed's victory. In November 2024, he defeated Rhonda Davis in the general election, winning 68 percent of the votes. He succeeded Southworth. He assumed office on January 1, 2025.
