= Scott Madon =

American politician

Member of the Kentucky Senate from the 29th district
- Incumbent
- Assumed office January 1, 2025
- Preceded by: Johnnie L. Turner

Mayor of Pineville, Kentucky
- In office January 5, 2015 – December 30, 2024
- Preceded by: Sherwin Rader
- Succeeded by: Shawn Fugate II
- In office November 9, 1987 – February 10, 1992
- Preceded by: Fred Roper
- Succeeded by: Michael Roan

Personal details
- Born: March 8, 1962 (age 64)
- Party: Republican

Scott Madon (born March 8, 1962) is an American politician and member of the Kentucky Senate from Kentucky's 29th Senate District. His district includes Bell, Floyd, Harlan, Knott, and Letcher counties. He was elected in the 2024 Kentucky Senate election by write-in vote against ten other candidates following the death of incumbent senator Johnnie L. Turner.

He is a member of the Republican Party.

== Background ==
Madon graduated from Pineville High School in 1981, and later attended Eastern Kentucky University. He is an insurance agent.

== Political career ==
=== Mayor of Pineville ===
In 1987, Madon began his political career when he was elected mayor of Pineville, Kentucky, becoming the youngest mayor in Kentucky at the time. He was first elected in a special election to succeed his father, who had resigned from the office. Madon was reelected to a full four-year term in 1989, but resigned in February 1992. He was elected mayor of Pineville a second time in 2014, defeating incumbent Sherwin Rader, and assumed office on January 5, 2015. During his tenure, he served on the executive committee of the Kentucky League of Cities. He would remain in office until December 30, 2024, when he resigned to assume office as a state senator following his victory in the 2024 Kentucky Senate election.

=== State Senate ===
On October 22, 2024, incumbent Johnnie L. Turner of Kentucky's 29th Senate district died from injuries sustained in an accident. By October 25, eleven write-in candidates, including Madon, had filed to run for the now vacant 29th Senate district seat. With the endorsement of U.S. Representative Hal Rogers and the Kentucky Senate Republican Caucus, Madon won the election with 6,825 votes (35.2%), and assumed office on January 1, 2025.

=== Electoral history ===
2024 Kentucky Senate 29th district election
Party	Candidate	Votes	%
Write-in	Scott Madon	6,825	35.2
Write-in	Willie Crase	2,892	14.9
Write-in	James Tyler Ward II	2,006	10.3
Write-in	James Richard Tanner Hesterberg	1,908	9.8
Write-in	Justin Wade Noble	1,844	9.5
Write-in	Leonard Hendrickson	1,266	6.5
Write-in	Valerie Ison Horn	1,238	6.4
Write-in	Craig E. Blackburn	722	3.7
Write-in	John Clem	443	2.3
Write-in	Paul Williams	152	0.8
Write-in	Andrew Thomas Saylor	106	0.5
Total votes		19,402	100.0
