= Franklin-Simpson High School =

High school in Kentucky, United States

Coordinates: 36.7155°N 86.5809°W

Location
- 400 South College Street; Franklin, (Simpson County), Kentucky 42134; United States

Information
- Type: Public high school
- School district: Simpson County Schools
- NCES District ID: 2105400
- NCES School ID: 210540001301
- Principal: Michael Wix
- Teaching staff: 57.95 (FTE)
- Enrollment: 858 (2023-2024)
- Student to teacher ratio: 14.81
- Colors: Blue and white
- Nickname: Wildcats

Franklin-Simpson High School is a high school in Franklin, Kentucky, United States. Franklin-Simpson is the only high school located in Simpson County, Kentucky. As of 2016, the school has 916 students enrolled and has 52 full-time teachers. The school was built in the 1960s to replace the old high school in Franklin. The school ranks 13th in Kentucky academically. Franklin-Simpson also boasts a very successful athletic department, with them constantly being a threat to win district, Regional, and even State Titles. Franklin-Simpson has been in the top 20 in the Kentucky state academic rankings since 2014.

== Athletics ==
Franklin-Simpson in athletics are known as the Wildcats and Lady Cats. The school colors are Blue and White. Overall, they have five total state titles, four in football with two in class 3A and two in class 4A (1979, 1980, 2017 and 2018), and one in baseball (1991).

Football: The FSHS Wildcat football team has long been a historic power in southern Kentucky football. Consistently winning local district titles, regional titles, and making deep runs in the KHSAA Football playoffs.

== Notable alumni ==
- Joe Blanton, MLB baseball pitcher
- Annie Potts, actress
- Joker Phillips, football coach and former player
- Brad M. Kelley, businessman
- Ed Gallrein, farmer, former Navy SEAL officer, Republican Party nominee in the U.S. House of Representatives election for Kentucky's fourth congressional district in 2026.
- Kenny Perry, PGA Tour professional golfer
