= Denise Harper Angel =

American politician

Member of the Kentucky Senate from the 35th district
- In office January 1, 2005 – January 1, 2025
- Preceded by: David Karem
- Succeeded by: Keturah Herron

Personal details
- Born: November 24, 1953 (age 72) Louisville, Kentucky, U.S.
- Party: Democratic

Denise Harper Angel (born November 24, 1953) is an American politician who served in the Kentucky Senate from 2005 to 2025. Prior to being elected, she worked in various positions of public service, including roles on other campaigns. She was also a delegate to the Democratic National Convention in 1992. She did not run for reelection in 2024.
