= Keturah Herron =

American politician

Keturah J. Herron
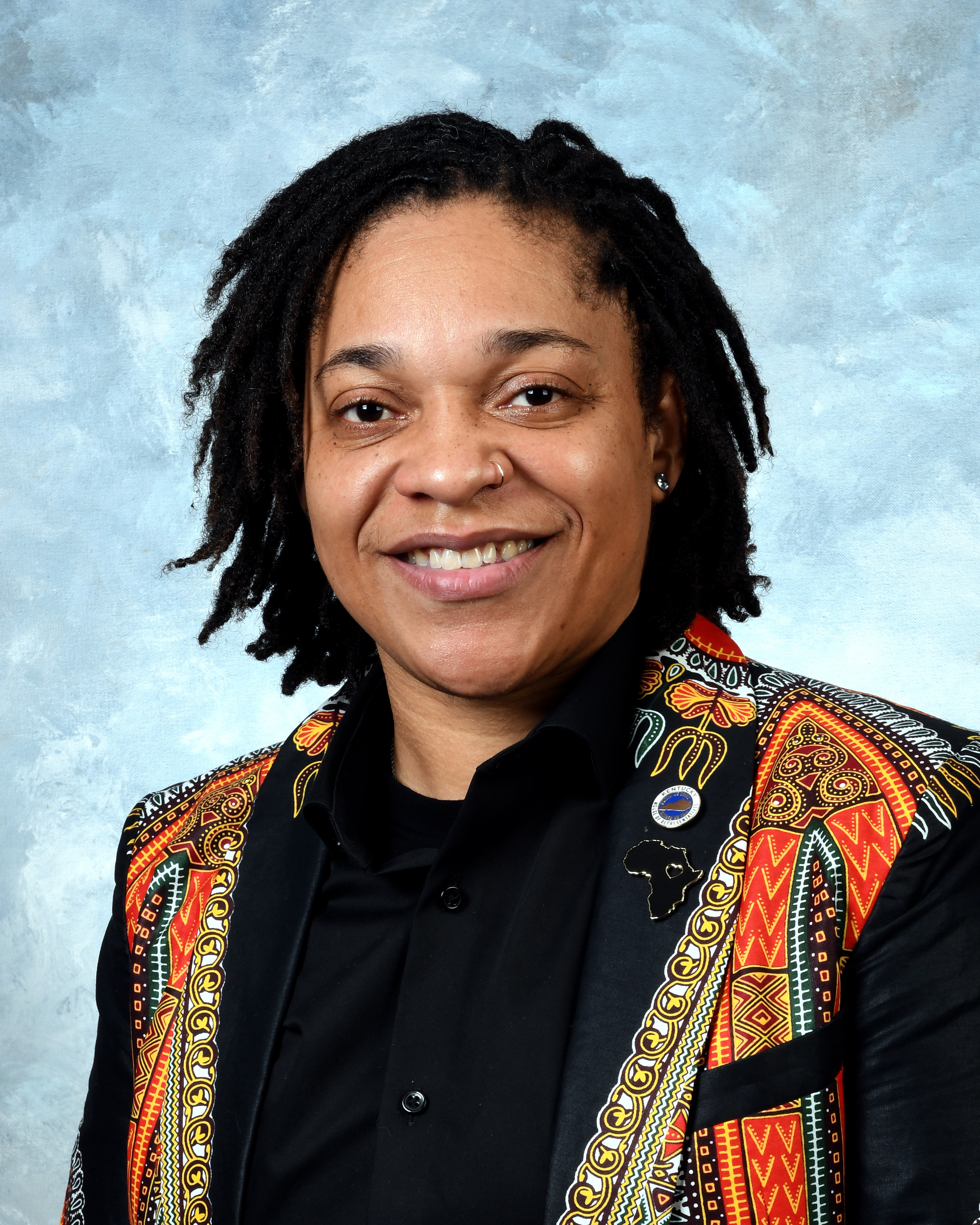
- Official Portrait, 2022

Member of the Kentucky Senate from the 35th district
- Incumbent
- Assumed office January 1, 2025
- Preceded by: Denise Harper Angel

Member of the Kentucky House of Representatives from the 42nd district
- In office February 28, 2022 – January 1, 2025
- Preceded by: Reginald Meeks
- Succeeded by: Joshua Watkins

Personal details
- Born: March 22, 1980 (age 46)
- Party: Democratic

Keturah Joy Herron (born March 22, 1980) is an American politician from Kentucky. She is Democrat and represents District 35 in the Kentucky Senate. When elected to the Kentucky House in 2022, she became the first out LGBTQ+ member of the Kentucky General Assembly.

Herron was named as one of USA Today's Women of the Year in 2022, which recognizes women who have made a significant impact.

Herron was elected to the Kentucky Senate in 2024.

Herron uses they/she pronouns.

== Early life and education ==
Herron was raised by her single mother in Richmond, Kentucky.

In early adulthood, Herron's cousin was incarcerated, leading her to assume guardianship of her two minor sons. Because of this, Herron gained a first-hand understanding of how the criminal justice system can affect Kentucky families.

Keturah graduated from the University of Louisville with a Bachelors of Art in sports management and from Eastern Kentucky University with a Masters of Art in corrections and juvenile justice.

== Political career ==
In her time in the House of Representatives, Herron has worked to address issues around gun violence and has pushed for an Office of Community Safety. Herron has also worked towards restoring voting rights to those who were formerly incarcerated. She was also an advocate for pay raises for teachers.

In 2016 Herron worked in the Administrative Office of Courts, and worked with youth that were in trouble with the law, and in the process of deciding whether or not she should go to court. She had the lowest court referral rate out of anyone in the office. When questioned, she responded she did what she thought was ‘common sense’, and talked to the families before deciding, which none of the other office workers had done. This led to the courts changing their policies.

2022 had marked Herron's first bill passed on the House floor, HR 644, which aimed to establish an office of gun violence prevention. During their campaigning in 2022, she focused on several highlighted key issues such as voter rights/restoration, criminal justice reform, increasing the minimum wage, education/workforce issues, and child abuse and violence prevention. Herron is often credited for getting Breonna Taylor's law passed through the Louisville Metro Council, an ordinance banning “No-Knock” warrants. In 17 days following the death of Breonna Taylor caused by the Louisville police, Herron pushed for Breonna's Law—which outlaws no-knock warrants—and was passed by the Louisville Metro Council. Less than a year later, they formed a bipartisan coalition that successfully passed a statewide prohibition on no-knock warrants via the General Assembly.

In 2024, Herron spoke out in opposition of the Safer Kentucky Act (HB 5), which would criminalize the act of sleeping in cars, or outside in public areas, as part of many proposed policy and law changes. 24 SR 22, “A Resolution adjourning the Senate in honor and loving memory of Thomas Eugene, “Tom Brahm,” was adjourned through a voice vote also in 2024.

=== Legislation ===
Since 2022, Herron has been a primary sponsor of the following bills which have been considered by at least one house:

Bill	Title	House Vote	Senate Vote	Governor	Ky. Acts
HB 124	An act relating to employment	Passed 95–1	Not voted	—N/a	—N/a
HB 551	An act relating to cold cases	Passed 98–0	Passed 38–0	Signed	2024 c. 63
HB 3	An act relating to human trafficking.	Passed 96–0	Passed 38–0	Signed	2024 c.61
HB 157	An act relating to interrogation of children.	Passed 96–0	Passed 38–0	Signed	2024 c. 115
HB 446	An act relating to public school transportation.	Passed 93–1	Passed 37–0	Signed	2024 c. 9
HB 447	An act relating to the transportation of students and declaring an emergency.	Passed 94–0	Passed 38–0	Signed	2024 c. 35
HB 551	An act relating to cold cases.	Passed 98–0	Passed 38–0	Signed	2024 c. 63
HB 378	An act relating to state symbols.	Passed 95–1	Passed 38–0	Signed	2024 c. 88
