= Cassie Chambers Armstrong =

American politician

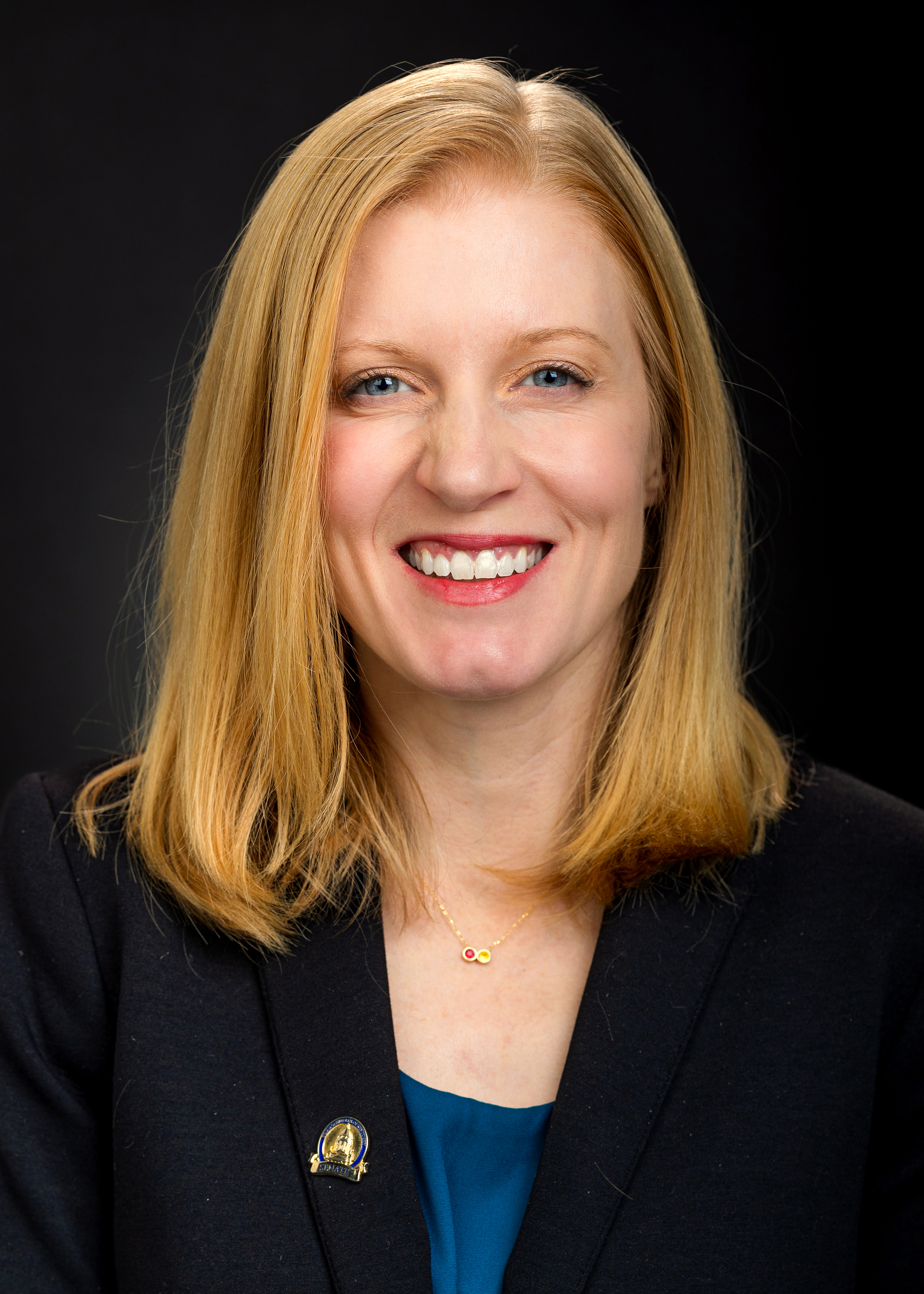
- Official portrait, 2025

Member of the Kentucky Senate from the 19th district
- Incumbent
- Assumed office March 2, 2023
- Preceded by: Morgan McGarvey

Member of the Louisville Metro Council from the 8th District
- In office January 1, 2021 – February 21, 2023
- Preceded by: Brandon Coan
- Succeeded by: Benjamin Reno-Weber

Personal details
- Born: September 30, 1986 (age 39)
- Party: Democratic
- Education: Yale University (BA, MPH); London School of Economics (MS); Harvard Law School (JD)

Cassie Chambers Armstrong (born September 30, 1986) is an American politician who is a member of the Democratic Party representing District 19 in the Kentucky Senate since March 2, 2023. A former member of the Louisville Metro Council, she served from January 1, 2021, until she won a special election on February 21, 2023, to fill the state Senate vacancy left by U.S. Representative Morgan McGarvey. Outside of her legislative service, she is an assistant professor of law at the University of Louisville Brandeis School of Law.

In October 2025, she replaced David Yates as Senate Minority Whip.
