= Border enforcement =

Border enforcement is a type of immigration enforcement whereby a country enforces its immigration laws by trying to prevent people from crossing its border or borders illegally. There are multiple methods a country can use to do this, including patrolling its border and building walls along part or all of it. The term is most commonly used in regards to the efforts by the United States government to prevent people from migrating illegally to the U.S. by crossing the Mexico–United States border. Since 2002, the number of United States Border Patrol agents has more than doubled, to a total of 20,273 (as of September 2016), and federal spending on the Patrol has increased from $1.4 to $3.8 billion over the same time. In addition to the Patrol, agencies responsible for border enforcement in the U.S. include Immigration and Customs Enforcement.

== Effects ==
The consequences of increased border enforcement along the U.S.–Mexico border have included, as intended, making it harder for Mexican immigrants to come to the U.S. illegally. However, this practice has also had the unintended consequence of turning the illegal immigration problem into a human smuggling problem, as migrants have to rely more on smugglers to make it across the border undetected. It has also led to a significant increase in migrant deaths along the border, as would-be illegal immigrants increasingly try to migrate to the U.S. via more dangerous, and less aggressively patrolled, routes. In regards to the general tendency of Mexicans to migrate illegally to the U.S., American border enforcement appears to have had very little effect. It may have also had another unintended consequence: turning what was previously a "circular flow" of workers traveling back and forth between Mexico and the United States into millions of families living in the United States illegally. Another study indicates that enforcement decreased the size of the undocumented population significantly from 1997 to 2003 (though before then its effect was either less negative or significantly positive).
