= Adrienne Southworth =

American politician (born 1988)

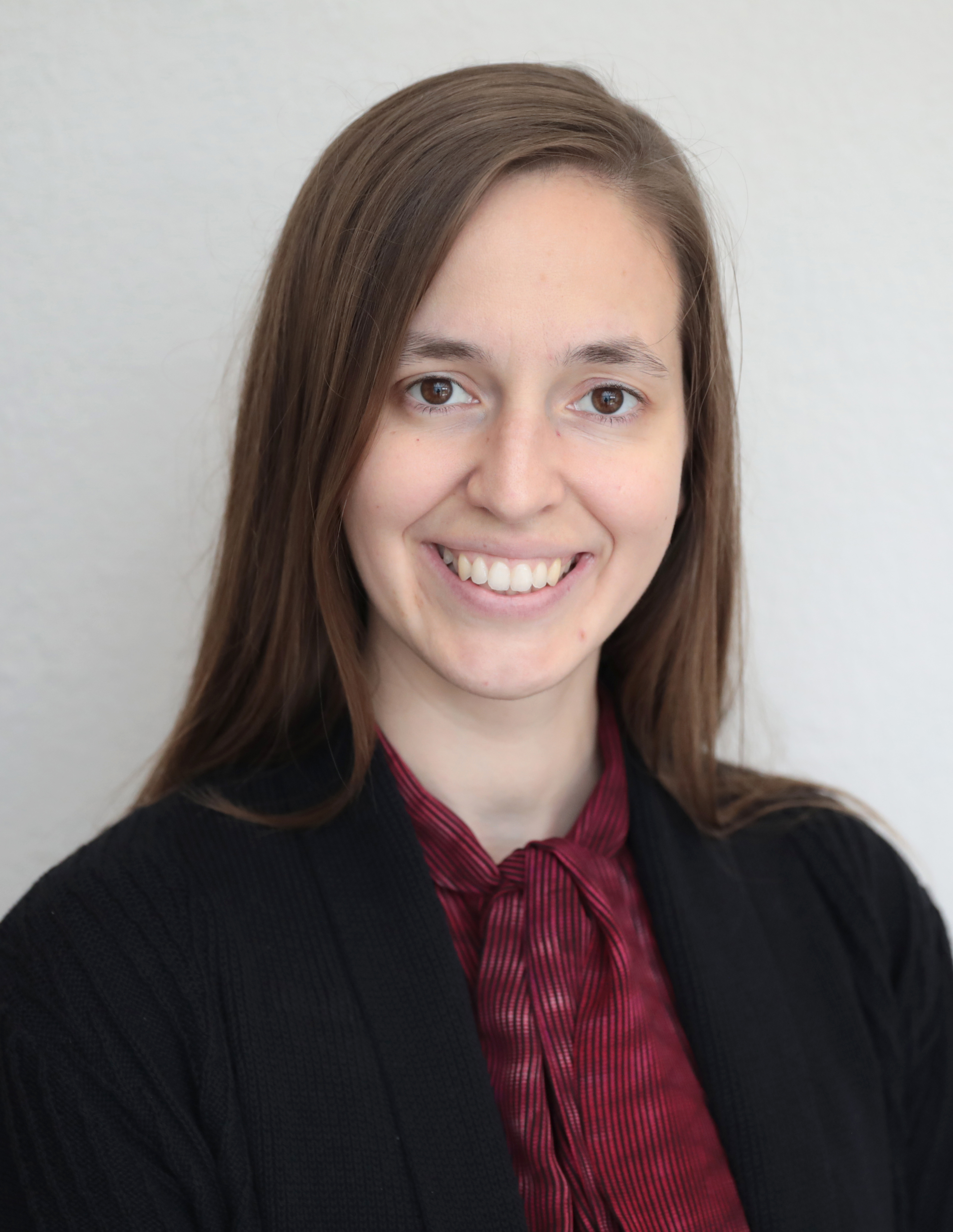
- Southworth at the 2022 Hazlitt Summit hosted by Young Americans for Liberty Foundation

Member of the Kentucky Senate from the 7th district
- In office January 1, 2021 – January 1, 2025
- Preceded by: Julian Carroll
- Succeeded by: Aaron Reed

Personal details
- Born: April 18, 1988 (age 38)
- Party: Republican
- Relatives: Courtney Gilbert (sister)
- Education: Louisiana Baptist University (BA); Mitchell Hamline School of Law (JD)

Adrienne E. Southworth (born April 18, 1988) is an American politician from Kentucky. She is a Republican who represented District 7 in the Kentucky Senate. She was defeated for renomination in the 2024 primaries.

After Donald Trump lost the 2020 election and refused to concede, Southworth promoted falsehoods and conspiracy theories about election fraud, including an unsubstantiated claim that all presidential elections since Ronald Reagan's victory in 1980, with the exception of Trump's victory in 2016, have been rigged.

In February 2021, Southworth filed Senate Bill 158 as its sole sponsor, looking to ban the mandate of face mask requirements during a state of emergency amidst the COVID-19 pandemic in Kentucky. She has also spoken out against compulsory vaccinations, and in 2021 proposed an amendment to Senate Bill 2 that would prohibit health facilities from requiring employees to receive a COVID-19 vaccine.

In 2024, Southworth introduced a bill that sought to prevent students from using college IDs as a primary source of identification when voting at the polls. Kentucky Secretary of State Michael Adams criticized the bill, saying it would reduce turnout among young people.
