= Brandon J. Storm =

American politician

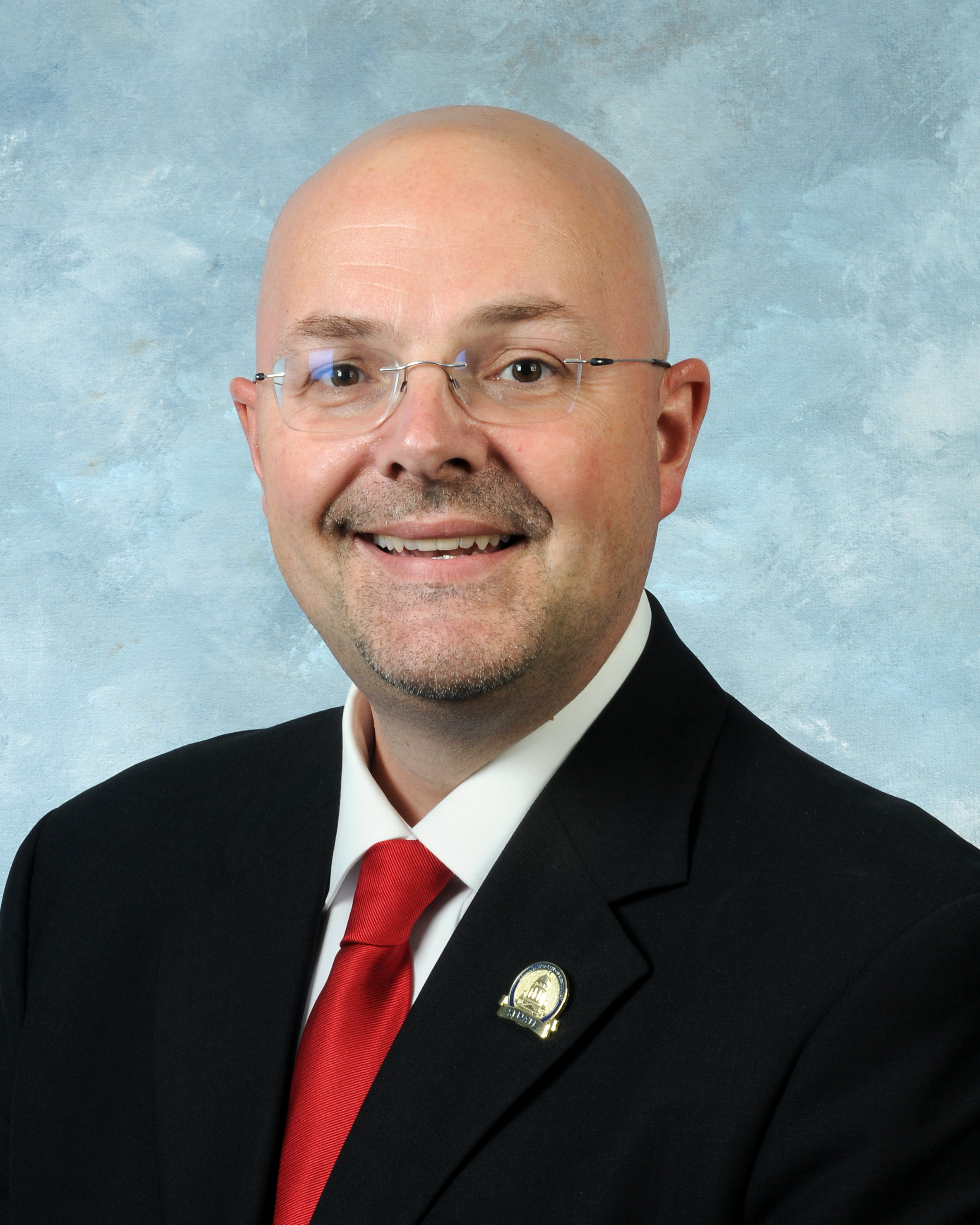
- Official portrait, 2021

Member of the Kentucky Senate from the 21st district
- Incumbent
- Assumed office January 1, 2021
- Preceded by: Albert Robinson

Personal details
- Born: Brandon Jackson Storm; May 14, 1976 (age 50)
- Party: Republican
- Spouse: Jaclyn
- Children: 3
- Education: Eastern Kentucky University (BS); Mississippi College (JD)

Brandon Jackson Storm (born May 14, 1976) is an American attorney and politician serving as a member of the Kentucky Senate from the 21st district. Elected in November 2020, he assumed office on January 1, 2021.

== Early life and education ==
Storm is a native of Laurel County, Kentucky. He earned a Bachelor of Science degree in police administration from Eastern Kentucky University in 2000 and a Juris Doctor from the Mississippi College School of Law in 2003.

== Career ==
Storm worked in independent law firms before founding his own in 2009. He was elected to the Kentucky Senate in November 2020 and assumed office on January 1, 2021. He also serves as chair of the Senate Judiciary Committee.
