= 2024 Kentucky elections =

- November 5, 2024
- Registered: 3,548,136
- Turnout: 58.80% ▲20.74 pp
Turnout
40–45%
45–50%
50–55%
55–60%
60–65%
65–70%
Electorate by party registration
Republican
40–50%
50–60%
60–70%
70–80%
80–90%
90–100%
Democratic
40–50%
50–60%
60–70%
70–80%

A general election was held in the U.S. state of Kentucky on November 5, 2024. The primary election for all offices was held on May 21, 2024. The last day to register to vote in the primary election was April 22 and the last day to register to vote in the general election was October 7.

== Federal offices ==
=== President and Vice President of the United States ===
Kentucky has 8 electoral votes in the Electoral College. Former president Donald Trump won with 64 percent of the vote. He had previously won the state in both 2016 and 2020.

=== United States House of Representatives ===
Kentucky has six congressional districts, electing five Republicans and one Democrat.

== State offices ==
=== Kentucky Senate ===
The Kentucky Senate consists of 38 members. In 2024, half of the chamber (all odd-numbered districts) was up for election. Republicans maintained their majority without gaining or losing any seats.

=== Kentucky House of Representatives ===
All 100 seats in the Kentucky House of Representatives were up for election in 2024. Republicans maintained their majority without gaining or losing any seats.

=== Kentucky Supreme Court ===
Current districts of the Supreme Court.

The Kentucky Supreme Court consists of 7 justices elected in non-partisan elections to staggered eight-year terms. District 5, occupied by chief justice Laurance B. VanMeter, was the only seat up for election in 2024. The district is composed of 8 counties in the Lexington area. VanMeter announced in September 2023 that he would not be seeking reelection. He was succeeded by judge Pamela R. Goodwine.

=== Commonwealth’s Attorneys ===
Commonwealth's Attorneys, who serve as the prosecutors for felonies in the state, are elected to six-year terms. One attorney is elected for each of the 57 circuits of the Kentucky Circuit Courts. Following the 2018 elections, 32 attorneys were affiliated with the Democratic Party, 24 with the Republican party, and one independent.

2024 Kentucky Commonwealth’s Attorneys elections
- November 5, 2024

All 57 circuits of the Kentucky Circuit Courts
	Majority party	Minority party	Third party
Party	Republican	Democratic	Independent
Last election	24	32	1
Seats before	29 (Note: A Republican won a special election in the 15th circuit, previously held by a Democrat, in November 2022. Additionally, five Democratic incumbents in the 4th, 9th, 11th, 35th, and 56th circuits switched parties following the 2018 elections.)	26 (Note: Matt Butler (D) was appointed in the 47th circuit following the resignation of Edison Banks (R).)	2 (Note: The Democratic incumbent in the 1st circuit switched parties following the 2018 elections.)
Seats won	37	18	2
Seat change	▲8	▼8	Steady
- Results: Democratic gain Republican gain Democratic hold Republican hold Independent hold Popular vote: 50–60% 60–70% 80–90% >90% 50–60% >90% >90%

Summary of elections
Circuit		Incumbent			Candidates
#	Counties	Attorney	Party	Status	Candidates
1	Ballard, Carlisle, Fulton, Hickman	Michael B. Stacy	Independent	Incumbent re-elected.	▌Michael B. Stacy (Independent)
2	McCracken	Daniel Y. Boaz	Democratic	Incumbent retired. Republican gain.	▌Donna L. Dixon (Republican)
3	Christian	Maureen Leamy	Republican	Incumbent re-elected.	▌Maureen Leamy (Republican)
4	Hopkins	Kathryn Hibbs Senter	Republican	Incumbent re-elected.	▌Kathryn Hibbs Senter (Republican)
5	Crittenden, Union, Webster	Zac Greenwell	Democratic	Incumbent re-elected.	▌Zac Greenwell (Democratic)
6	Daviess	Mike Van Meter	Democratic	Incumbent re-elected.	▌Mike Van Meter (Democratic)
7	Logan, Todd	Neil Kerr	Republican	Incumbent re-elected.	▌Neil Kerr (Republican)
8	Edmonson, Warren	Kori Beck Bumgarner	Democratic	Incumbent re-elected.	▌Kori Beck Bumgarner (Democratic)
9	Hardin	Shane Young	Republican	Incumbent re-elected.	▌Shane Young (Republican)
10	Hart, LaRue, Nelson	Terry L. Geoghegan	Democratic	Incumbent retired. Democratic hold.	▌Kyle W. Williamson (Democratic)
11	Green, Marion, Taylor, Washington	Shelly Miller	Republican	Incumbent re-elected.	▌Shelly Miller (Republican)
12	Henry, Oldham, Trimble	Courtney T. Baxter	Republican	Incumbent re-elected.	▌Courtney T. Baxter (Republican)
13	Garrard, Jessamine	Andy Sims	Republican	Incumbent re-elected.	▌Andy Sims (Republican)
14	Bourbon, Scott, Woodford	Sharon Muse Johnson	Republican	Incumbent lost renomination. Republican hold.	▌Kelli Kearney (Republican)
15	Carroll, Grant, Owen	Leigh Tomlinson Roberts	Republican	Incumbent re-elected.	▌Leigh Tomlinson Roberts (Republican)
16	Kenton	Rob Sanders	Republican	Incumbent re-elected.	▌Rob Sanders (Republican)
17	Campbell	Michelle Snodgrass	Democratic	Incumbent retired. Republican gain.	▌Michael C. Zimmerman (Republican)
18	Harrison, Nicholas, Pendleton, Robertson	Douglas Miller	Democratic	Incumbent retired. Republican gain.	▌Michael Wade Laws (Republican)
19	Bracken, Fleming, Mason	Christopher L. Kelley	Democratic	Incumbent lost re-election. Republican gain.	▌Johnathan Gay (Republican) 65.1%; ▌Christopher L. Kelley (Democratic) 34.9%
20	Greenup, Lewis	Melvin C. Leonhart	Democratic	Incumbent retired. Republican gain.	▌Rhese David McKenzie (Republican)
21	Bath, Menifee, Montgomery, Rowan	Ashton McKenzie	Democratic	Incumbent re-elected.	▌Ashton McKenzie (Democratic)
22	Fayette	Kimberly Henderson Baird	Democratic	Incumbent re-elected.	▌Kimberly Henderson Baird (Democratic)
23	Estill, Lee, Owsley	Heather Buntin Combs	Republican	Incumbent retired. Democratic gain.	▌Beverly Arvin Brewer (Democratic)
24	Johnson, Lawrence, Martin	Floyd Anthony Skeans	Republican	Incumbent retired. Republican hold.	▌David Matt Runyon (Republican)
25	Clark, Madison	David W. Smith	Democratic	Incumbent re-elected.	▌David W. Smith (Democratic)
26	Harlan	Steven Parker Boggs	Democratic	Incumbent retired. Republican gain.	▌Karen S. Davenport (Republican)
27	Knox, Laurel	Jackie L. Steele	Republican	Incumbent re-elected.	▌Jackie L. Steele (Republican)
28	Lincoln, Pulaski, Rockcastle	David L. Dalton	Republican	Incumbent re-elected.	▌David L. Dalton (Republican)
29	Adair, Casey	Brian Wright	Republican	Incumbent re-elected.	▌Brian Wright (Republican)
30	Jefferson	Gerina D. Whethers	Democratic	Incumbent re-elected.	▌Gerina D. Whethers (Democratic)
31	Floyd	Arnold Brent Turner	Democratic	Incumbent re-elected.	▌Arnold Brent Turner (Democratic)
32	Boyd	Rhonda Copley	Republican	Incumbent re-elected.	▌Rhonda Copley (Republican)
33	Perry	Vacant		Scott Blair (D) resigned. Republican gain.	▌John Hansen (Republican) 50.4%; ▌Jonathan Wilder (Democratic) 49.6%
34	McCreary, Whitley	Ronnie Bowling	Republican	Incumbent re-elected.	▌Ronnie Bowling (Republican)
35	Pike	Billy G. Slone	Republican	Incumbent re-elected.	▌Billy G. "Bill" Slone (Republican)
36	Knott, Magoffin	Todd Martin	Democratic	Incumbent re-elected.	▌Todd Martin (Democratic)
37	Carter, Elliott, Morgan	Brandon Ison	Democratic	Incumbent re-elected.	▌Brandon Ison (Democratic)
38	Butler, Hancock, Ohio	Blake Ross Chambers	Republican	Incumbent re-elected.	▌Blake Ross Chambers (Republican)
39	Breathitt, Powell, Wolfe	Miranda Stevens King	Democratic	Incumbent re-elected.	▌Miranda Stevens King (Democratic)
40	Clinton, Cumberland, Monroe	Jesse M. Stockton Jr.	Republican	Incumbent re-elected.	▌Jesse M. Stockton Jr. (Republican)
41	Clay, Jackson, Leslie	Gary H. Gregory	Republican	Incumbent lost renomination. Republican hold.	▌Haley Jo Fields (Republican) 85.2%; ▌Jake Roberts (Democratic) 14.8%
42	Calloway, Marshall	Dennis R. Foust	Independent	Incumbent re-elected.	▌Dennis R. Foust (Independent)
43	Barren, Metcalfe	John Bishop Gardner	Democratic	Incumbent re-elected.	▌John Bishop Gardner (Democratic)
44	Bell	Lisa Fugate	Republican	Incumbent lost renomination. Republican hold.	▌Mike Taylor (Republican) 68.6%; ▌Jessie Moberg (Democratic) 31.4%
45	McLean, Muhlenberg	Clayton Douglas Adams	Democratic	Incumbent re-elected.	▌Clayton Douglas Adams (Democratic)
46	Breckinridge, Grayson, Meade	Rick Allen Hardin	Republican	Incumbent re-elected.	▌Rick Allen Hardin (Republican)
47	Letcher	Matthew Thomas Butler	Democratic	Incumbent re-elected.	▌Matthew Thomas Butler (Democratic) 56.3%; ▌Edison G. Banks II (Republican) 43.7%
48	Franklin	Larry Cleveland	Democratic	Incumbent re-elected.	▌Larry Cleveland (Democratic)
49	Allen, Simpson	Corey Morgan	Republican	Incumbent lost renomination. Republican hold.	▌Mike Lindsey (Republican)
50	Boyle, Mercer	Richard Bottoms	Democratic	Incumbent retired. Republican gain.	▌Justin Johnson (Republican)
51	Henderson	Herbert L. McKee, Jr.	Democratic	Incumbent re-elected.	▌Herbert L. McKee Jr. (Democratic)
52	Graves	Richard Kemp	Democratic	Incumbent lost re-election. Republican gain.	▌George Shannon Powers (Republican) 52.8%; ▌Richard "Richie" Kemp (Democratic) 47.2%
53	Anderson, Shelby, Spencer	Hart Megibben	Republican	Incumbent re-elected.	▌Hart Megibben (Republican)
54	Boone, Gallatin	Louis Kelly	Republican	Incumbent re-elected.	▌Louis Kelly (Republican)
55	Bullitt	Bailey Taylor	Republican	Incumbent retired. Republican hold.	▌Amanda Hernandez-Troutman (Republican)
56	Caldwell, Livingston, Lyon, Trigg	Carrie L. Ovey-Wiggins	Republican	Incumbent re-elected.	▌Carrie L. Ovey-Wiggins (Republican)
57	Russell, Wayne	Matthew Leveridge	Republican	Incumbent re-elected.	▌Matthew Leveridge (Republican)

=== Circuit Clerks ===
Results by county: Republican: 50–60%; 60–70%; 80–90%; 100%; Democratic: 100%

Each county elected a Circuit Court Clerk to a six-year term. Republican candidates won in 76 counties, while Democrats won 44.

== Local offices ==
=== Mayors ===
Mayors in Kentucky are elected to four-year terms, with cities holding their elections in either presidential or midterm years. Cities with mayoral elections in 2024 included Ashland, Bowling Green, Covington, Frankfort, Newport, Owensboro, and Paducah. Special elections were held for unexpired terms in Brandenburg and Prestonsburg.

Summary of elections
City	Incumbent			Candidates
City	Mayor	First elected	Status	Candidates
Ashland	Matt Perkins	2020	Incumbent retired.	Chuck Charles 51.5%; Joshua Blanton 48.%
Bowling Green	Todd Alcott	2020	Incumbent re-elected.	Todd Alcott 52.7%; Patti Minter 47.3%
Brandenburg (special)	David Pace	2024 (Note: Pace was appointed by the Brandenburg City Council to replace outgoing mayor Bryan Claycomb, beginning January 1, 2024.)	Incumbent retired.	Bruce Fackler
Covington	Joseph U. Meyer	2016	Incumbent retired.	Ronald Washington
Frankfort	Layne Wilkerson	2020	Incumbent re-elected.	Layne Wilkerson 62.0%; Katrisha Waldridge 38.0%
Newport	Thomas Guidugli	2020	Incumbent re-elected.	Thomas Guidugli
Owensboro	Tom Watson	2016 (Note: Watson previously served as mayor from 2005 to 2008.)	Incumbent re-elected.	Tom Watson 56.9%; Pamela Smith-Wright 43.1%
Paducah	George Bray	2020	Incumbent re-elected.	George Bray 70.2%; David Guess 29.8%
Prestonsburg (special)	Rick Hughes	2024 (Note: Hughes was appointed by the Prestonsburg City Council to replace outgoing mayor Les Stapleton, who resigned on March 12, 2024.)	Incumbent re-elected	Rick Hughes 56.0%; David Gearheart 30.4%; Danny Martin 13.6%

=== City Councils ===
Each incorporated city elected its council members to a two-year term.

=== School boards ===
Local school board members are elected to staggered four-year terms, with half up for election in 2024.

=== Louisville Metro Council ===
The Louisville Metro Council is elected to staggered four-year terms, with even-numbered districts up for election in 2024.

== Ballot measures ==
Two constitutional amendments were proposed by the Kentucky General Assembly to be voted on in the general election.

=== Amendment 1 ===
Amendment 1
- November 5, 2024
- Citizenship Requirement for Voting Amendment

Results
Choice	Votes	%
Yes	1,210,581	62.38%
No	730,053	37.62%
Total votes	1,940,634	100.00%

Yes
70–80%
60–70%
50–60%

==== Text ====
Are you in favor of amending Sections 145 and 155 of the Constitution of Kentucky to prohibit persons who are not citizens of the United States from being allowed to vote in the Commonwealth of Kentucky, as stated below?

IT IS PROPOSED THAT SECTION 145 OF THE CONSTITUTION OF KENTUCKY BE AMENDED TO READ AS FOLLOWS:

Every citizen of the United States of the age of eighteen years who has resided in the state one year, and in the county six months, and the precinct in which he or she offers to vote sixty days next preceding the election, shall be a voter in said precinct and not elsewhere. No person who is not a citizen of the United States shall be allowed to vote in this state. The following persons also shall not have the right to vote:

1. Persons convicted in any court of competent jurisdiction of treason, or felony, or bribery in an election, or of such high misdemeanor as the General Assembly may declare shall operate as an exclusion from the right of suffrage, but persons hereby excluded may be restored to their civil rights by executive pardon.

2. Persons who, at the time of the election, are in confinement under the judgment of a court for some penal offense.

3. Idiots and insane persons.

IT IS PROPOSED THAT SECTION 155 OF THE CONSTITUTION OF KENTUCKY BE AMENDED TO READ AS FOLLOWS:

The provisions of Sections 145 to 154, inclusive, shall not apply to the election of school trustees and other common school district elections. Said elections shall be regulated by the General Assembly, except as otherwise provided in this Constitution. No person who is not a citizen of the United States shall be allowed to vote in said elections.

==== Results ====
Amendment 1
Choice	Votes	%
For	1,210,581	62.38
Against	730,053	37.62
Total	1,940,634	100.00

=== Amendment 2 ===
If enacted, the amendment would have allowed the General Assembly to fund charter schools.

==== Results ====
Results by county: No: 50–60%; 60–70%; 70–80%

Amendment 2
Choice	Votes	%
For	707,819	35.21
Against	1,302,466	64.79
Total	2,010,285	100.00

== See also ==
- Elections in Kentucky
- Politics of Kentucky
- Political party strength in Kentucky
