= Kentucky Senate =

Upper house of the Kentucky General Assembly

Coordinates: 38°11′12.4″N 84°52′33.5″W

- Kentucky General Assembly

Type
- Type: Upper house
- Term limits: None

History
- New session started: January 6, 2026 (adjourned)

Leadership
- President: Robert Stivers (R) since January 8, 2013
- President pro tempore: David P. Givens (R) since January 8, 2019
- Majority Leader: Max Wise (R) since January 7, 2025
- Minority Leader: Gerald Neal (D) since January 3, 2023

Structure
- Seats: 38
- Political groups: Republican (32); Democratic (6)
- Length of term: 4 years

Elections
- Last election: November 3, 2026 (19 seats)
- Next election: November 7, 2028 (19 seats)
- Redistricting: Legislative control

Meeting place
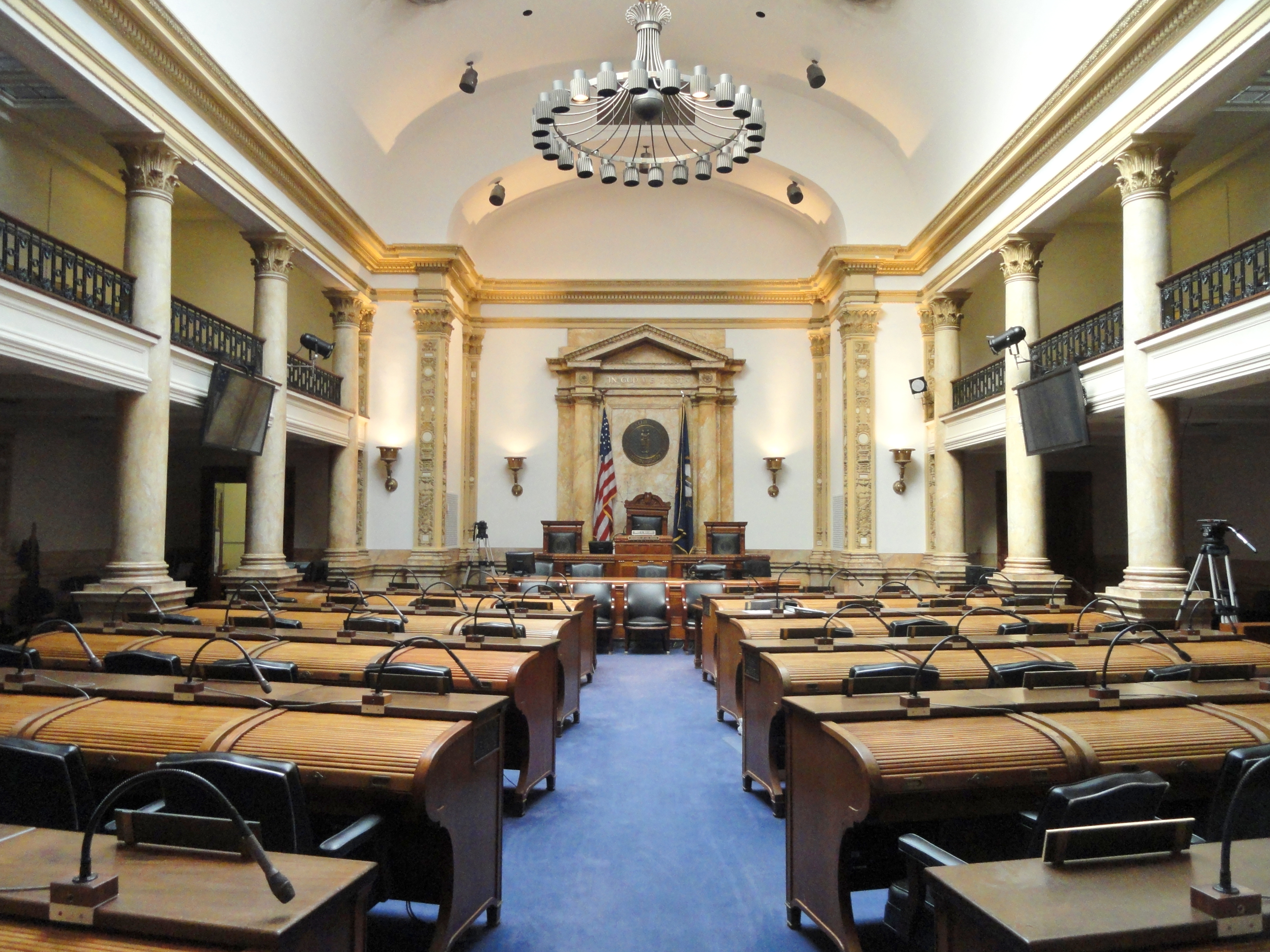
- Senate Chamber; Kentucky State Capitol; Frankfort, Kentucky

Website
- Legislative Research Commission

Rules
- Rules of the Senate (2026)

The Kentucky Senate is the upper house of the Kentucky General Assembly. The Kentucky Senate is composed of 38 members elected from single-member districts throughout the Commonwealth. The Kentucky Senate meets at the Kentucky State Capitol in Frankfort annually beginning in January. Sessions last for 60 legislative days in even-numbered years and 30 legislative days in odd-numbered years.

The Republican Party has had control of the Senate since 1999, currently holding 32 seats, with the Democratic Party holding 6. Senators serve four-year terms with no term limits; half (19) of the senators are up for election every second year, coinciding with federal House of Representatives and Senate elections.

== Terms and qualifications ==
According to Section 32 of the Kentucky Constitution, a senator must:

- be at least 30 years old;
- be a citizen of Kentucky;
- have resided in the state at least six years and the district at least one year prior to election.

Per section 30 of the Kentucky Constitution, senators are elected to four year staggered terms, with half the Senate elected every two years.

== Leadership ==
Prior to a 1992 constitutional amendment, the Lieutenant Governor of Kentucky presided over the Senate; the 1992 amendment created a new office of President of the Senate to be held by one of the 38 senators.

=== Leaders ===
- President (elected by full body): Robert Stivers (R-25)
- President pro tempore (elected by full body): David P. Givens (R-9)

Additionally, each political party elects a floor leader, whip, and caucus chairman.

Current party leadership of the Kentucky Senate:

- Republican Party
  - Leader: Max Wise (R-16)
  - Whip: Mike Wilson (R-32)
  - Caucus chair: Robby Mills (R-4)
- Democratic Party
  - Leader: Gerald Neal (D-33)
  - Whip: Cassie Chambers Armstrong (D-19)
  - Caucus chair: Reginald L. Thomas (D-13)

== Recent composition ==
Senate composition by district Held by Democrats Held by Republicans

Session	Party (Shading indicates majority caucus)		Total	Vacant
Session	Republican	Democratic	Total	Vacant
2015 session	26	11	37	1
2016 session	27	11	38	0
2017–2018 sessions	27	11	38	0
2019 session	28	9	37	1
2020 session	29	9	38	0
2021–2022 sessions	30	8	38	0
2023 session	30	6	36	2
2024 session	31	7	38	0
2025 session	31	7	38	0
2026 session	32	6	38	0
Latest voting share	84.2%	15.8%		

== List of current senators ==
District	Name	Party	First elected	Residence	Counties
1	Jason Howell	Republican	2020	Murray	Calloway, Crittenden, Fulton, Graves, Hickman, Lyon, Trigg
2	Danny Carroll	Republican	2014	Benton	Ballard, Carlisle, Livingston, Marshall, McCracken
3	Craig Richardson	Republican	2024	Hopkinsville	Caldwell, Christian, Muhlenberg
4	Robby Mills	Republican	2018	Henderson	Henderson, Hopkins, Union, Webster
5	Stephen Meredith	Republican	2016	Leitchfield	Breckinridge, Butler, Grayson, Meade, Ohio
6	Lindsey Tichenor	Republican	2022	Smithfield	Jefferson (Part), Oldham, Trimble
7	Aaron Reed	Republican	2024	Shelbyville	Anderson, Henry, Jefferson (Part), Shelby
8	Gary Boswell	Republican	2022	Owensboro	Daviess, Hancock, McLean
9	David P. Givens	Republican	2008	Greensburg	Barren, Edmondson, Green, Hart, Warren (Part)
10	Matthew Deneen	Republican	2022	Elizabethtown	Hardin, Jefferson (Part)
11	Steve Rawlings	Republican	2024	Burlington	Boone (Part)
12	Amanda Mays Bledsoe	Republican	2022	Lexington	Boyle, Fayette (Part), Mercer, Woodford
13	Reginald L. Thomas	Democratic	2013 (Note: Elected in a special election.)	Lexington	Fayette (Part)
14	Jimmy Higdon	Republican	2009	Lebanon	Larue, Marion, Nelson, Spencer, Washington
15	Rick Girdler	Republican	2016	Somerset	Clinton, Cumberland, Pulaski, Russell, Wayne
16	Max Wise	Republican	2014	Campbellsville	Adair, Allen, Metcalfe, Monroe, Taylor, Warren (Part)
17	Matt Nunn	Republican	2024	Sadieville	Fayette (Part), Grant, Kenton (Part), Scott
18	Robin L. Webb	Republican	2009 (Note: Originally a member of the Democratic Party, Webb became a Republican in 2025.)	Grayson	Boyd, Carter, Greenup, Lewis
19	Cassie Chambers Armstrong	Democratic	2023	Louisville	Jefferson (Part)
20	Gex Williams	Republican	2022 (Note: Williams previously served in the senate from 1993 to 1999.)	Verona	Boone (Part), Carroll, Franklin, Gallatin, Kenton (Part), Owen
21	Brandon J. Storm	Republican	2020	London	Casey, Laurel, Lincoln, Rockcastle
22	Donald Douglas	Republican	2021	Nicholasville	Fayette (Part), Garrard, Jessamine
23	Christian McDaniel	Republican	2012	Ryland Heights	Kenton (Part)
24	Shelley Funke Frommeyer	Republican	2022	Alexandria	Bracken, Campbell, Kenton (Part), Pendleton
25	Robert Stivers	Republican	1996	Manchester	Clay, Jackson, Knox, McCreary, Owsley, Whitley
26	Karen Berg	Democratic	2020	Louisville	Jefferson (Part)
27	Steve West	Republican	2015	Paris	Bourbon, Fayette (Part), Fleming, Harrison, Mason, Nicholas, Robertson, Rowan
28	Greg Elkins	Republican	2023	Winchester	Bath, Clark, Fayette (Part), Menifee, Montgomery
29	Scott Madon	Republican	2024	Pineville	Bell, Floyd, Harlan, Knott, Letcher
30	Brandon Smith	Republican	2008	Hazard	Breathitt, Estill, Lee, Leslie, Magoffin, Morgan, Perry, Powell, Wolfe
31	Phillip Wheeler	Republican	2019	Pikeville	Elliott, Johnson, Lawrence, Martin, Pike
32	Mike Wilson	Republican	2010	Bowling Green	Logan, Simpson, Todd, Warren (Part)
33	Gerald A. Neal	Democratic	1988	Louisville	Jefferson (Part)
34	Jared Carpenter	Republican	2010	Berea	Fayette (Part), Madison
35	Keturah J. Herron	Democratic	2024	Louisville	Jefferson (Part)
36	Julie Raque Adams	Republican	2014	Louisville	Jefferson (Part)
37	Gary Clemons	Democratic	2025	Louisville	Jefferson (Part)
38	Michael J. Nemes	Republican	2020	Shepherdsville	Bullitt, Jefferson (Part)

== Seating chart ==
	Meredith	Nemes	Smith	Carpenter	Raque Adams	Girdler
Howell	Douglas	Boswell	Wilson	Deneen	Elkins	West	Williams
McDaniel	Wheeler	Carroll	Mills	Mays Bledsoe	Madon	Tichenor	Storm
Higdon	Reed	Nunn	Wise	Neal	Chambers Armstrong	Thomas	Richardson
Stivers	Givens	Rawlings	Funke Frommeyer	Herron	Berg	Clemons	Webb
			President; Stivers

== History ==
Carolyn Conn Moore became the first woman to serve in the Kentucky Senate when in November 1949 she won a special election to replace her husband, J. Lee Moore, in the legislature after his death. Georgia Davis Powers became the first person of color to be elected to the Kentucky Senate in 1967. Gerald Neal became the first African American ever to be elected to a leadership position in the Kentucky General Assembly in 2014. Ralph Alvarado became the first Hispanic to serve in the Kentucky General Assembly when he was elected in 2014.

== Standing committees ==
Committee	Chair	Vice Chair
Agriculture	Jason Howell	Gary Boswell
Appropriations and Revenue	Christian McDaniel	Amanda Mays Bledsoe
Banking and Insurance	Jared Carpenter	Rick Girdler
Committee on Committees	Robert Stivers	none
Economic Development, Tourism, and Labor	Phillip Wheeler	Shelley Funke Frommeyer
Education	Stephen West	Lindsey Tichenor
Enrollment	Matt Nunn	none
Families and Children	Danny Carroll	Amanda Mays Bledsoe
Health and Services	Stephen Meredith	Craig Richardson
Judiciary	Brandon J. Storm	Phillip Wheeler
Licensing and Occupations	Julie Raque Adams	Jason Howell
Natural Resources and Energy	Brandon Smith	Gex Williams
Rules	Robert Stivers	none
State and Local Government	Michael J. Nemes	Greg Elkins
Transportation	Jimmy Higdon	Donald Douglas
Veterans, Military Affairs, and Public Protection	Matthew Deneen	Aaron Reed

== See also ==
- Kentucky House of Representatives
- List of Kentucky General Assemblies
- Government of Kentucky
