= 2006 Lexington, Kentucky mayoral election =

2006 Lexington mayoral election
- November 7, 2006
Candidate	Jim Newberry	Teresa Isaac
Popular vote	49,726	29,755
Percentage	62.56%	37.44%
Mayor before election
Teresa Isaac
Democratic
Elected Mayor
Jim Newberry
Democratic

The 2006 Lexington, Kentucky mayoral election was held on November 7, 2006. The primary election was held on May 16, with the top two candidates advancing to the general election.

Incumbent mayor Teresa Isaac, who was elected in 2002, was defeated for reelection by attorney Jim Newberry. Mayoral elections in Lexington are nonpartisan; both Isaac and Newberry were members of the Democratic Party.

== Primary election ==
=== Candidates ===
==== Advanced to general election ====
- Teresa Isaac, incumbent mayor
- Jim Newberry, attorney

==== Eliminated in primary ====
- Bill Farmer Jr., member of the Lexington-Fayette Urban County Council from the 5th district (1997–2007, 2011–2021)
- Charles F. Martin, cigar store owner

=== Results ===
Primary results
Candidate	Votes	%
Teresa Isaac (incumbent)	16,966	36.73
Jim Newberry	16,458	35.63
Bill Farmer Jr.	10,060	21.78
Charles F. Martin	2,703	5.85
Total votes	46,187	100.0

== General election ==
=== Endorsements ===
Teresa Isaac

Local officials

- Bill Farmer Jr., member of the Lexington-Fayette Urban County Council from the 5th district (1997–2007, 2011–2021)
Jim Newberry

Newspapers

- The Lexington Herald-Leader

=== Results ===
2006 Lexington mayoral election
Candidate	Votes	%
Jim Newberry	49,726	62.56
Teresa Isaac (incumbent)	29,755	37.44
Total votes	79,481	100.0
