= 2010 Lexington, Kentucky mayoral election =

2010 Lexington mayoral election
- November 2, 2010
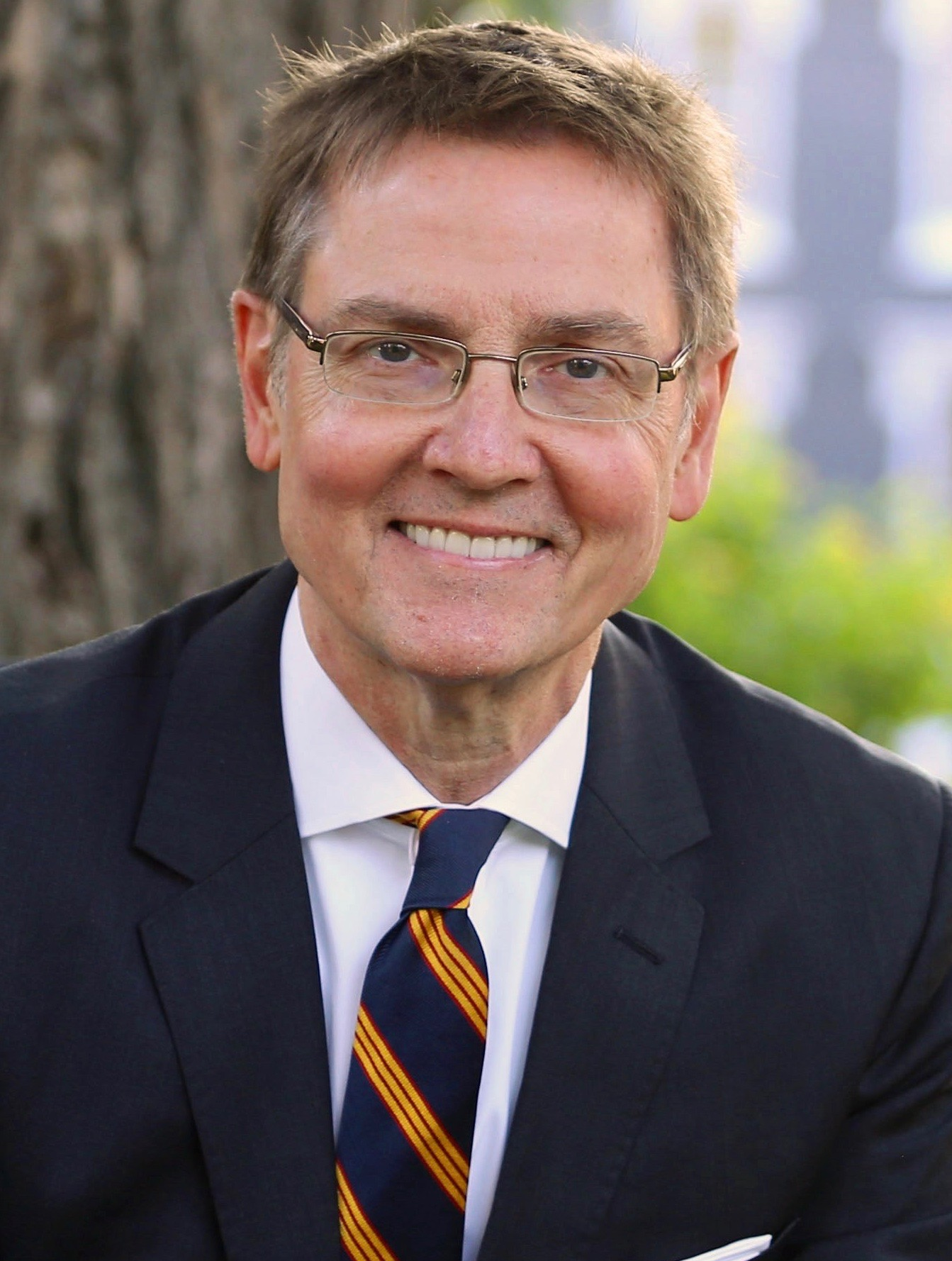

Candidate	Jim Gray	Jim Newberry
Popular vote	42,856	37,560
Percentage	53.28%	46.70%
Mayor before election
Jim Newberry
Democratic
Elected Mayor
Jim Gray
Democratic

The 2010 Lexington, Kentucky mayoral election was held on November 2, 2010. The primary election was held on May 18, with the top two candidates advancing to the general election.

Incumbent mayor Jim Newberry, who was elected in 2006, was defeated for reelection by councilman Jim Gray. Mayoral elections in Lexington are nonpartisan; both Newberry and Gray were members of the Democratic Party.

== Primary election ==
=== Candidates ===
==== Advanced to general election ====
- Jim Gray, at-large member of the Lexington-Fayette Urban County Council (2007–2011)
- Jim Newberry, incumbent mayor

==== Eliminated in primary ====
- Skip Horine
- Teresa Isaac, former mayor (2003–2007)

=== Results ===
Primary results
Candidate	Votes	%
Jim Newberry (incumbent)	21,648	43.68
Jim Gray	17,703	35.72
Teresa Ann Isaac	8,216	16.58
Skip Horine	1,997	4.03
Total votes	49,564	100.0

== General election ==
=== Endorsements ===
Jim Gray

Local officials

- Teresa Isaac, mayor of Lexington (2003–2007)

Newspapers

- The Lexington Herald-Leader

=== Results ===
2010 Lexington mayoral election
Candidate	Votes	%
Jim Gray	42,856	53.28
Jim Newberry (incumbent)	37,560	46.70
Will McGinnis (write-in)	19	0.02
Total votes	80,435	100.0
