= Teresa Isaac =

American politician (born 1955)

Teresa Ann Isaac

Mayor of Lexington
- In office January 6, 2003 – January 1, 2007
- Preceded by: Pam Miller
- Succeeded by: Jim Newberry

Member of the Lexington-Fayette Urban County Council from the at-large district
- In office January 1, 1990 – January 4, 1999

Personal details
- Born: July 3, 1955 (age 71) Lynch, Kentucky, U.S.
- Party: Democratic (from 1974)
- Other political affiliations: Republican (before 1974)
- Spouse: James I. Lowry IV (m. 1978; div. 1990)
- Children: 2
- Education: Transylvania University (BA); University of Kentucky (JD)

Teresa Ann Isaac (born July 3, 1955) is an American attorney and politician who was the mayor of Lexington, Kentucky from 2003 to 2007. She was previously an at-large member of the Lexington-Fayette Urban County Council from 1990 to 1999.

== Early life ==
Teresa Ann Isaac was born on July 3, 1955, in Lynch, Kentucky. Her father, Samuel T. Isaac, was a Republican politician who served as the mayor of Cumberland. In 1964, he unsuccessfully ran for Kentucky's 5th congressional district, losing the Republican nomination to Tim Lee Carter.

After moving to Lexington, Isaac graduated from Bryan Station High School, followed by Transylvania University. While in college, she was a summer intern for Republican senator Marlow Cook. Initially a Republican, her experience with the internship—which overlapped with the Watergate scandal in the summer of 1974—convinced her to become a member of the Democratic Party later that year. She later graduated from the University of Kentucky Rosenberg College of Law in 1979. Before running for office, Isaac was an attorney specializing in discrimination cases. She worked as an assistant Fayette County Attorney from 1986 to 1988.

== Political career ==
Isaac first ran for elective office in 1989, running to be one of three at-large members of the Lexington-Fayette Urban County Council. She won the election with 22 percent of the vote, placing second in a field of six candidates. As the second-place winner in the 1989 at-large election, she become vice mayor of Lexington on January 3, 1993, following the resignation of fellow councilor and incumbent vice mayor Pam Miller. Isaac was reelected in 1993 to a five-year term. (Note: While a term would normally be four years, at-large councilors were elected to five-year terms in 1993 in compliance with 1992 Kentucky Amendment 2, which moved many elections to even-numbered years.) She finished in first place with 25 percent of the vote, allowing her to continue as vice mayor for the entire term.

Isaac did not seek reelection to the council in 1998, instead running for the Democratic nomination for Kentucky's 6th congressional district. She placed third in the primary, losing to Ernesto Scorsone. In 2002, Isaac ran for mayor following the retirement of incumbent Pam Miller. She narrowly won the election, defeating at-large councilor Scott Crosbie win 51 percent of the vote. Despite elections in Lexington being nonpartisan, the race was noted for its unusually partisan tone. Crosbie received heavy support from the state Republican party, who distributed leaflets describing him as "Republican and Conservative" and a supporter of president George W. Bush; Isaac, by contrast, received support from fellow Democratic politicians but largely eschewed framing the election in partisan terms.

Isaac's term as mayor was marked by the controversy of whether the city should condemn the local privately owned water company using eminent domain. Isaac, who favored condemnation, launched an eminent domain suit against the company in 2003 but was at odds with the city council, who in 2005 ended the lawsuit. In the 2006 election, she was soundly defeated for reelection by attorney Jim Newberry, who won 62 percent of the vote. The issue of water condemnation was also put to a vote, similarly losing by over 20 points.

Isaac again ran for mayor in 2010 and in 2018, both times placing third in the primary election.

== Personal life ==
While attending law school, Isaac married fellow student James I. Lowry IV on December 30, 1978. The couple had two children and were later divorced in 1990.

== Notes ==
Political offices
Preceded by Pam Miller	Mayor of Lexington, Kentucky; 2003–2007	Succeeded by Jim Newberry
