= Eric Shelton =

Eric Shelton may refer to:

- Eric Shelton (American football) (born 1983), American football running back
- Eric Shelton (fighter) (born 1991), American mixed martial artist
