= John Wesley Hunt =

American businessman

- Born: 1773
- Died: 1849 (aged 75–76)
- Resting place: Lexington Cemetery
- Occupations: Merchant, horse breeder, banker, civic leader
- Spouse: Catherine Grosh
- Children: 13, including Charlton
- Relatives: Abraham Hunt (father); John Hunt Morgan (grandson); Thomas Hunt Morgan (great-grandson)

John Wesley Hunt (1773–1849) was an American businessman, and early civic leader in Lexington, Kentucky. He was one of the first millionaires west of the Allegheny Mountains. Hunt enslaved as many as 77 people, many of them children, including farm and industrial and domestic workers.

John Wesley Hunt was born in 1773 in Trenton, New Jersey. He was the son of a Lt. Col. in the Revolutionary War, Abraham Hunt, and Theodosia Pearson Hunt. Moving to Lexington in 1795, he became a merchant, slavetrader, horsebreeder, hemp manufacturer, and banker. In 1799, President John Adams named Hunt as postmaster of Lexington.

Beginning in 1800, he developed a profitable slave-trading business with his family members Abijah, Jeremiah, and Jesse Hunt beginning in 1800. John would ship the slaves from Kentucky to Mississippi, where Abijah predicted he could get an average of $500 for them (versus about $300 in Kentucky). A horsebreeder, he introduced the Messenger strain to Kentucky in the winter of 1839–1840.

He married Catherine Grosh, and in 1814, he built a two-story brick mansion known as "Hopemont" (today known as The Hunt-Morgan House) for him and his wife. Their son Charlton Hunt became the first mayor of Lexington.

He died in 1849. He was buried in the family plot at the Lexington Cemetery. His grandson, John Hunt Morgan, was a famous Confederate general during the American Civil War of 1861–1865. Through John Hunt Morgan, he was also the great-great-grandfather of African-American inventor Garrett Morgan. A great-grandson, Thomas Hunt Morgan, was the first person from Kentucky to win a Nobel Prize.
