= Scorsone =

Scorsone is an Italian surname. Notable people with the surname include:

- Caterina Scorsone (born 1981), Canadian-American actress
- Ernesto Scorsone (born 1952), American lawyer, politician, and Judge
