= Woodford County High School (Kentucky) =

Woodford County High School (WCHS)

Location
- 145 School House Road; Versailles, Kentucky 40383; United States; 38°02′34″N 84°44′52″W

Information
- Type: Public
- Motto: Hail Woodford, of Purest Gold!
- Established: 1963
- School district: Woodford County Public Schools
- Principal: Tyler Reed
- Staff: 161
- Faculty: 35
- Grades: 9–12
- Enrollment: 1,223 (2024–2025)
- Campus type: Suburban
- Colors: Yellow █ and Black █
- Athletics: Football (boys), Basketball, Soccer, Baseball (boys), Softball (girls), Swimming, Volleyball (girls), Wrestling, Cross-country, Track and Field, Diving, Tennis
- Athletics conference: KHSAA
- Nickname: Yellowjackets
- Fight Song: On, on, WCHS
- Pep-Rally Cheer: W C H S
- Website: wchs.woodford.kyschools.us

Woodford County High School (WCHS) is a public high school located in Versailles, Kentucky, serving students in grades 9–12. It is the primary high school for the Woodford County Public Schools district. While WCHS has been the county's sole traditional high school since 1963, the district expanded its offerings in 2021 with the establishment of the Woodford Virtual Learning Academy (WVLA), an alternative school providing online and hybrid instruction for students in grades 6–12.

In January 2024, WCHS transitioned from its long-standing 1963 campus to a new $75 million, 197,442-square-foot facility designed for 1,400 students. The former campus now stands as the Woodford County Public Schools District Board of Education.

The school is known for its historically dominant wrestling program, which has secured 13 state championships, and its nationally recognized cheerleading team. As of the 2025–2026 school year, the school is ranked among the top 100 high schools in Kentucky by U.S. News & World Report.

== History ==
At one time, Woodford County was served by three high schools: Midway High School, Versailles High School, and Simmons High School. Following consolidation, the 1963 Woodford County High School building served the community for 60 years.

On January 8, 2024, the school transitioned to a new $75 million, 197,442-square-foot facility located at 145 School House Road. The state-of-the-art campus features:

- Safety: Includes the first-of-its-kind storm shelter in Kentucky designed to house the entire student body and staff.
- Capacity: Designed for 1,400 students with flexible, 21st-century learning spaces.
- Facilities: A 2,062-seat gymnasium, a 420-seat auditorium, and subject-based academic wings.

== Athletics ==
The Yellow Jackets compete in the Kentucky High School Athletic Association (KHSAA).

- Wrestling: A historically dominant program with 13 state titles (1970–1974, 1977, 1993, 1996, 1997, 1999, 2000, 2002, 2005, 2006). In 2026, the girls' wrestling team placed 3rd overall in the state.
- Cheerleading: The cheer program is a national powerhouse, winning the 2025 UCA National High School Cheerleading Championship (Small Co-ed Division) and the 2026 UCA Large Coed D2 Game Day title.
- Baseball: State Champions in 2012.
- Football: Under Head Coach Dennis Johnson, the team was ranked No. 1 in Class 5A during the 2025 season.

== Academics ==
Woodford County High School is consistently ranked among the top public high schools in Kentucky. As of the 2025-2026 school year, it is ranked #101 in Kentucky and #7,288 nationally by U.S. News & World Report.

- Enrollment: Approximately 1,298 students (Grades 9–12) with a 19:1 student-teacher ratio.
- Performance: The school maintains a graduation rate well above the state average, with roughly 54% of students scoring proficient or better in reading.

=== Media program ===
Established in 1974 as "Telecommunications," the WCHS Media Program celebrated its 50th anniversary in 2024. The program recently expanded to a four-year curriculum, allowing students to specialize in broadcasting, digital filmmaking, and live production of the school's daily video announcements. The new building includes a modern, dedicated media center to support these productions.

== Clubs and organizations ==
=== Band ===
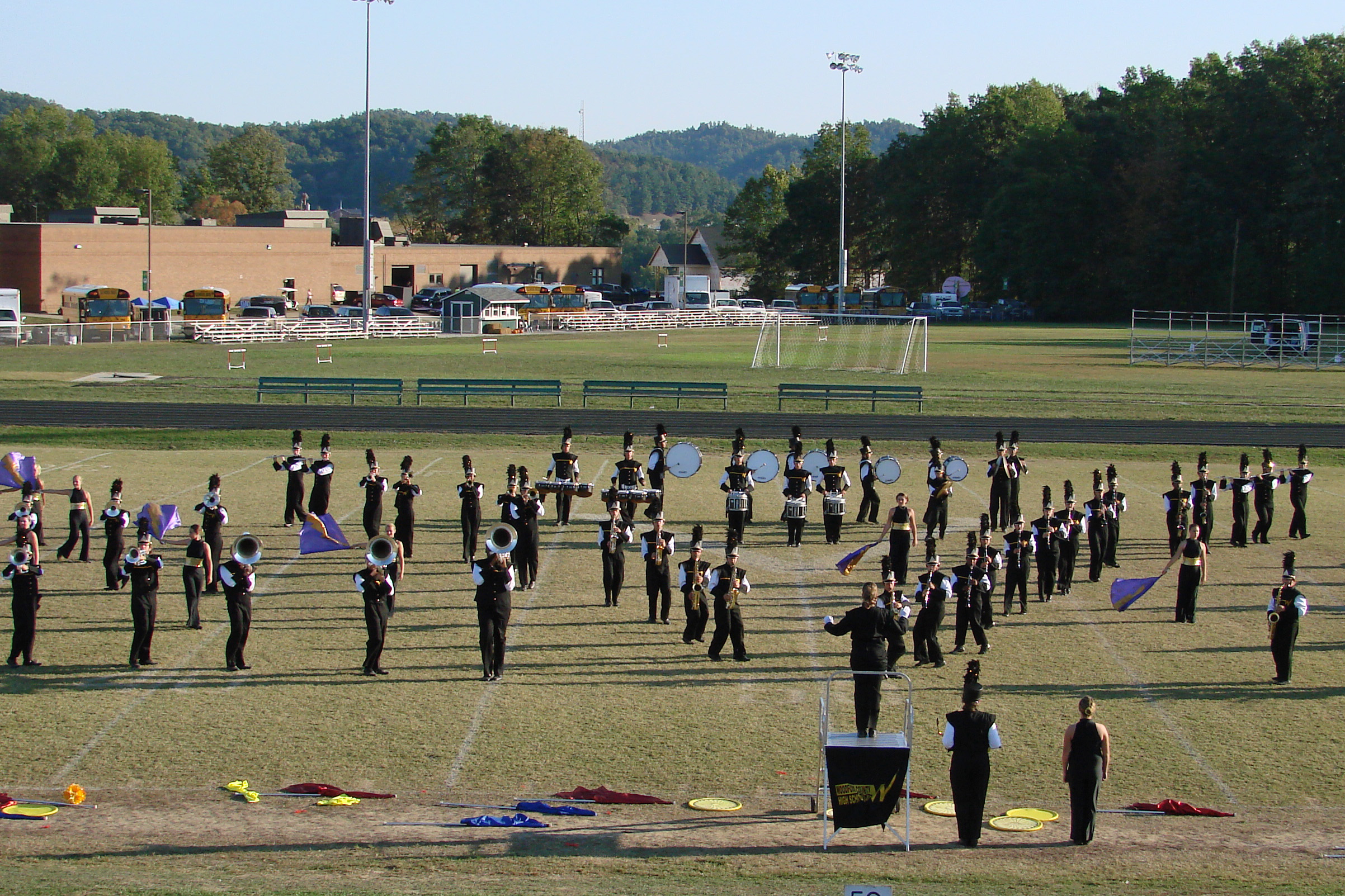
WCHS Band at a competition in Morehead, October 2007.

== Traditions ==
- School Cheer: A signature tradition performed at spirit gatherings. Led by a staff member at mid-court, classes respond in a call-and-response format (Seniors: "W", Juniors: "C", Sophomores: "H", Freshmen: "S") repeated five times.

== Competition results ==
WCHS cheer has won the state title in the Game Day division in the following years: 2022, 2024, 2025

== Notable alumni ==
Notable alumni include:

- Ben Chandler (Class of 1979), former US Rep.
- Shaun King (Class of 1997), Civil Rights Activist
- Sturgill Simpson (Class of 1996), Grammy winning country music singer
- Emma Curtis (Class of 2014), Lexington-Fayette Urban County Council member, first openly transgender city official in Kentucky

== Notes ==
Percentages are NOT based on percentage of questions answered correctly; it is based on the percentage of students scoring a proficient or better.
