= Bryan Station High School =

American public high school

Location
- 201 Eastin Road; Lexington, Kentucky 40505; United States
- 38°4′0″N 84°27′25″W

Information
- School type: Public
- Motto: Animo Et Fide (By courage and faith)
- Founded: 1958
- School district: Fayette County Public Schools
- Principal: Eric Hale
- Teaching staff: 119.50 (on a FTE basis)
- Grades: 9–12
- Enrollment: 2,025 (2023-2024)
- Student to teacher ratio: 16.95
- Campus: Large city
- Colors: Green; Gold; Navy Blue
- Nickname: Defenders/ Lady Defenders
- Website: bshs.fcps.net

Bryan Station High School, founded in 1958, is a high school within the Fayette County Public Schools system in Lexington, Kentucky, United States. During the 2006–2007 school year, students were moved to their newly built school known as Bryan Station High. The school was named for Bryan Station, an 18th-century pioneer settlement. The school's sports teams are called the Defenders, and the school mascot is the "Mean Man"; the school says "His persona reflects the heritage of the pioneers at the siege of Bryan Station Fort between the British and Indians in 1782."

== Athletics ==
The Defenders support 15 different sports teams including football, basketball, soccer, baseball, wrestling, softball, volleyball, tennis, lacrosse, swimming and track and field. The Defenders' football team won the 1971 2A title. The Defenders' boys track team took home titles in 1971, 1975, and 1979–83. Athletic teams typically play against other teams from Fayette County, including Henry Clay High School, Lafayette High School, Paul Laurence Dunbar High School, and Tates Creek High School.

== Notable alumni ==
- Scotty Baesler – Politician; former mayor of Lexington and congressman.
- Zach Brock - Jazz violinist; member of Snarky Puppy
- Cornell Burbage – NFL player
- Dermontti Dawson – NFL player
- Doug Flynn – former Major League Baseball infielder
- Jack Givens – NBA player
- Teresa Isaac – Politician; former mayor of Lexington.
- Tony Jackson – NBA player
- Devon Key - NFL player
- Frank LeMaster – NFL player
- Shelvin Mack – NBA player
- Eric Shelton – NFL player
- Mohamed Thiaw — MLS player
- Melvin Turpin – NBA player
- Robert Washington – College basketball coach
- Keith "Jamm" Frank (basketball) - Christian Rapper, Pastor/Teacher, Technology Consultant, Reclaimed Wood Specialist
- Lawrence Weathers - Lexington, Kentucky Police Chief
- Denise Gray – Politician; first African-American woman outside of Louisville to run for Kentucky State Senate
