= Emma Curtis =

Kentucky politician (born 1996)

Member of the Lexington-Fayette Urban County Council from the 4th district
- Incumbent
- Assumed office January 6, 2025
- Preceded by: Brenda Monarrez

Personal details
- Born: July 30, 1996 (age 30) Lexington, Kentucky, U.S.
- Education: Centre College (BA)
- Occupation: Politician, activist, filmmaker

Emma Lee Curtis (born July 30, 1996) is an American politician, activist, and filmmaker from Kentucky. In 2024, she was elected to the Lexington-Fayette Urban County Council, representing the 4th District. Curtis assumed office on January 6, 2025. Curtis is the first openly transgender person to serve on the Urban County Council in Lexington and the second transgender public official in Kentucky.

== Early life and education ==
Curtis was born in Lexington, Kentucky, and raised on her family's tobacco and cattle farm in Woodford County. She graduated from Woodford County High School and earned a bachelor's degree from Centre College, a private liberal arts college in Danville, Kentucky, in 2018.

== Career and activism ==
After college, Curtis pursued a career as an independent filmmaker, focusing on stories highlighting the experiences of individuals in central Kentucky. She additionally became a dedicated advocate for LGBTQ+ rights and increased civic engagement. Curtis has been actively involved with organizations such as CivicLex, the Lexington Forum, and the Fayette Women's Network, which aim to enhance civic health and community involvement in Lexington.

=== Senate Bill 150 ===
In 2023, Curtis gained national attention for her activism against Kentucky's Senate Bill 150, a legislative measure that imposed restrictions on discussions of sexuality and pronoun use in classrooms and banned gender-affirming care for transgender minors. Her testimony against the bill went viral, amplifying her voice as a leading advocate for transgender rights in the state. In remarks shared by the Kentucky branch of the ACLU, Curtis shared how gender-affirming care saved her life, after she felt social pressure and stigma to detransition, an experience that led to a suicide attempt.

After Senate Bill 150 became law, Curtis and her family joined the families of other transgender people in Kentucky in a lawsuit against the bill. In December 2024, Curtis joined the ACLU and other activists outside the Supreme Court as arguments were held in United States v. Skrmetti, a case deciding the lawfulness of gender-affirming care for minors.

=== Woman A ===
In the summer of 2024, the Kentucky Legislative Research Commission put representative Daniel Grossberg under investigation after a number of allegations came to light accusing Grossberg of inappropriate interactions with women. Grossberg was later removed from his committee assignments. In September 2024, Curtis came forward as "Woman A", publicly naming herself as one of the victims of Grossberg's conduct. Curtis claimed that the legislator pressured her to drink alcohol and "drunkenly interrogated me about my genitals and sex life". The day after Curtis's statement ran in the Herald-Leader, the Kentucky House Democratic caucus voted to expel Grossberg from the caucus and called for his resignation.

== Political career ==
In June 2023, Curtis announced her candidacy for the Democratic nomination in the Kentucky House of Representatives's 93rd district. Her campaign, contesting a special election to succeed Lamin Swann, was historic, as she sought to become the first openly transgender state legislator in Kentucky.

Curtis's platform focused on affordable housing, improving public education, reproductive justice, and workers’ rights, specifically aiming to repeal right to work laws. Curtis raised $10,000 in donations in the first week, and she was considered a front-runner for the Democratic nomination.

The nominating committee of the county Democratic Party selected Adrielle Camuel to run for the seat. Camuel's selection caused controversy, as she was a member of the committee. After Camuel's selection, Curtis endorsed and campaigned for Camuel. In September 2023, Curtis rescinded her support for Camuel after concerns over Camuel's language and behavior on trans rights issues. After Curtis and 11 other transgender Kentucky leaders wrote an open letter to Camuel condemning her remarks, Camuel issued a formal apology.

=== Lexington-Fayette Urban County Council ===
In January 2024, Curtis announced her candidacy for the Lexington-Fayette Urban County Council's 4th district. Curtis campaigned on a platform advocating for a more inclusive society for all residents of Lexington. Her campaign focused on issues such as improving road safety, addressing affordable housing, and enhancing government transparency. In the November 2024 general election, Curtis defeated incumbent councilwoman Brenda Monarrez, securing 51.8% of the vote. Her victory made her the first openly transgender person elected to the Urban County Council in Lexington and the second transgender public official in Kentucky, following Rebecca Blankenship.

Late night television host John Oliver mentioned Curtis's victory on his show Last Week Tonight. "[E]ven amid the GOP's massive anti-trans ad campaign, on Tuesday, [...] at least 35 transgender and gender-expansive candidates won races in places like Montana, Hawaii and Kentucky, where Emma Curtis was elected to the [Lexington-Fayette Urban County Council], and that is a big deal," Oliver said on his show's first episode after the 2024 general election.

On January 12, 2025, Curtis was sworn in as a council member for the 2025–2026 legislative session. She has said that her presence in public office serves as an inspiration for young transgender individuals, demonstrating that they have a place and a voice in their communities.

=== 2026 Lexington-Fayette Urban County Council Election ===
In October 2026, Curtis was issued a cease-and-desist letter by a lawyer representing Brenda Monarrez, who was rechallenging Curtis for the 4th district. The letter regarded social media comments related to Monarrez's membership in the Democratic Party and the allegations made against her in 2024. In 2024, Monarrez was accused of repeatedly sexually assaulting fellow councilwoman Denise Gray. Gray was granted a three-year protection order against Monarrez, rendering her unable to attend any council meetings in-person. Monarrez ultimately defeated Curtis for reelection, winning the 4th district with 53 percent of the vote.

== See also ==
- LGBTQ rights in Kentucky
