= Rebecca Blankenship =

American activist and politician (born 1993)

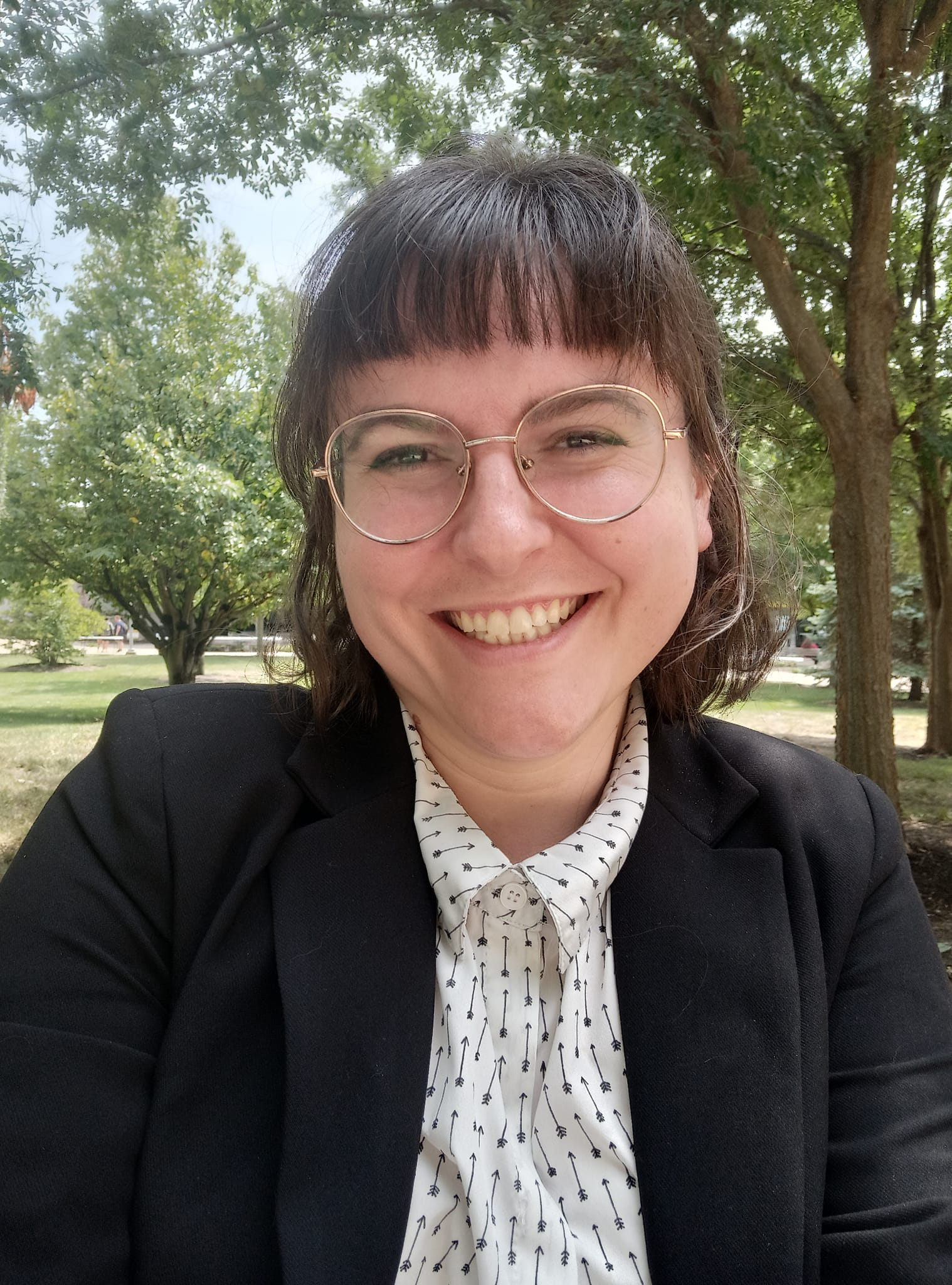
- Blankenship in 2023
- Born: August 24, 1993 (age 33)
- Education: Marshall County High School; Transylvania University
- Title: Member of the Berea Independent School District Board
- Term: January 2023 – August 2024

Rebecca Blankenship (born August 24, 1993) is an American activist and politician. In 2022, Blankenship was elected to the Berea Independent School Board, making her the first openly transgender official elected in the state of Kentucky.

== Early and personal life ==
Rebecca Blankenship is from Benton, Kentucky and graduated from Marshall County High School. Blankenship was studying at Transylvania University when she came out as transgender in 2012, becoming the first openly transgender student at the college. After taking time away from college, she returned to Transylvania University in 2017, graduating with her Bachelor of Arts (BA) degree in 2019. She graduated with a major in philosophy, politics, and economics with a minor in English. That same year, Blankenship also received the 2019 Judy Gaines Young Student Writing Award.

Blankenship is continuing her education at Northern Kentucky University-Salmon P. Chase College of Law. She is projected to graduate from the Salmon P. Chase College of Law in May 2027.

Blankenship married her wife, a conversion therapy survivor, in 2019; the couple have a blended family of seven children. As a young adult, Blankenship struggled with alcoholism and addiction; she has been sober since 2016.

== Career ==
=== Activism ===
Blankenship was the executive director of Ban Conversion Therapy Kentucky, an organization dedicated to protecting minors from conversion therapy, pseudoscientific attempts to change an individual's sexual orientation or gender identity/expression. Blankenship was also the assistant executive director of the Kentucky Student Rights Coalition. Ban Conversion Therapy Kentucky (BCTK) was later dissolved by reason of unfiled annual reports by the Kentucky Secretary of State. Andy Beshear, governor of Kentucky, signed an executive order to ban conversion therapy in September 2024.

Blankenship has been an outspoken critic of state laws, such as House Bill 470, that target trans youth.

=== Political career ===
Blankenship was elected to the Kentucky State Central Executive Committee, becoming "the first openly trans person elected by delegates to the Kentucky Democratic Party’s leadership".

In 2022, Blankenship was elected to a four-year term on the Berea Independent School Board, making her the first openly transgender official in Kentucky. She was elected with 55 votes after filing as a write in candidate. She noted that she ran to improve the community's schools, which her children attend, and although she was running in a conservative area, "nobody bothered me about my trans identity, very much at all". As a member of the school board, her stated priorities included "pay raises for teachers, energy efficient classrooms and improving vocational education".

While continually advocating for more transgender individuals to run for public office, she emphasized the importance of looking at rural communities:

"It's not regular people who want to hurt us, it's national organizations that try to co-opt religion to build power through hate [...] The fact that Kentucky's first openly trans elected official didn’t come from a city, but from a little bitty mountain town, proves that the stereotype of queerphobic rural conservatives is just not the reality [...] My election showed that this is something that can happen. [...] If a trans person can win here in an Appalachian state's hills, they can win anywhere."

On August 19, 2024, Blankenship resigned from the Berea Community School Board after moving with her partner to a house outside of the school district which left her legally ineligible for board service.

== Legacy ==
In 2024, Emma Curtis was elected to the Lexington City Council as the first transgender person on the council, and the second openly transgender person in the state to hold public office, following Blankenship.

== Awards and honors ==
- 24 to Watch in 2024, Lexington Herald-Leader
