= Charlton Tandy =

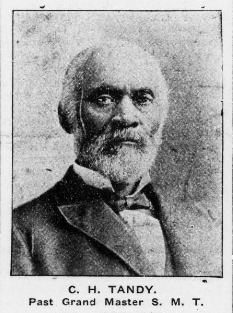
- Born: Charlton Hunt Tandy c. 1836; Lexington, Kentucky, U.S.
- Died: 1919
- Occupations: lawyer, newspaper publisher, state legislator-elect, public official, civil rights activist, volunteer militia officer

Charlton "Charles" Hunt Tandy (c. 1836 – 1919) was an African American volunteer militia officer in Missouri, lawyer, newspaper publisher, state legislator-elect, public official, and civil rights activist.

== Biography ==
Tandy was born in Lexington, Kentucky, in about 1836 and was named after the city's first mayor, Charlton Hunt.

He worked to integrate streetcars (horse-drawn at the time) in St. Louis, including organizing a boycott after legal injunctions failed to stop discriminatory practices. He established an organization to aid Exodusters. He also helped establish Lincoln University. He led protest of the siting of Sumner High School in a heavily polluted area in close proximity to a lead works, lumber and tobacco warehouses, and the train station as well as an area of brothels. He said that black students deserved clean and quiet schools the same way white students do. He was a Republican.

The State Historical Society of Missouri has a collection of his papers. The Tandy Community Center and Tandy Park in St. Louis is named for him.
