= Pam Miller =

American politician

Mayor of Lexington
- In office January 3, 1993 – January 6, 2003
- Preceded by: Scotty Baesler
- Succeeded by: Teresa Isaac

Personal details
- Party: Democratic
- Spouse: Ralph Miller
- Education: Smith College

Pam Miller served as the mayor of Lexington, Kentucky from 1993 to 2003. On January 3, 1993, she became Lexington's first woman mayor. She was first elected to the Urban County Council in 1973 and was the first woman elected to public office in the city. She served from 1974 to 1977 and again from 1980 to 1993. She served as vice-mayor before becoming mayor after the resignation of Scotty Baesler, who was elected to the United States Congress in 1992. She was elected to a full term as mayor in 1993 and again in 1998, though she chose not to run for a third term in 2002.

Under her leadership, Lexington developed an Urban Area Greenspace Plan in 1994. In 1995, she founded Partners for Youth, a non-profit organization that serves as a clearinghouse for funding programs for youth in Lexington. This development occurred after the shooting and killing of Antonio Orlando Sullivan, an eighteen-year-old African American male, by a white police officer in October 1994 which had caused a public outcry.

Upon her retirement as mayor, Pam Miller remained active in civic affairs. She became a member and then chair of the Prichard Committee for Academic Excellence (serving as chair from 2006 to 2010), and the Lexington Opera Society (chair, 2007–2009). Governor Steve Beshear appointed her to the Kentucky Council on Postsecondary Education in 2008, and served as the Council's vice chair from February 2010 to December 2011. She was elected as the Council's chair in 2012 and has been reappointed in that leadership role each year since. Her current term on the Council ended on December 31, 2018.

== Background ==
Miller earned her bachelor's degree in European history, magna cum laude, from Smith College in 1960. She taught history and French in Connecticut. She married physician and former Olympic alpine skier Dr. Ralph E. Miller Jr. in 1962. They had three children: two boys and one girl. She worked for the Congressional Quarterly in Washington D.C. from 1962 to 1965 as a reporter and editor. From 1966 to 1969 she a grant writer at Boston ABCD (Action for Boston Community Development), an anti-poverty and community development organization. She also worked for The Boston Globe.

The Millers left Boston in 1969 when Dr. Miller got a Research Fellowship in Neuroendocrinology at Stanford University in California. They came to Lexington in 1970 from California when Dr. Miller was hired at the University of Kentucky to be a professor of pharmacology. Soon after that, Pam Miller started in 1972 what is now the Lexington Farmers Market.

== Honors ==
On September 12, 2002, Mayor Miller was presented by the University of Kentucky with a rose created to honor her and her service to the city of Lexington.

== Bibliography ==
- "Interview with Pam Miller, August 23rd, 1996". Louie B Nunn Center for Oral History. University of Kentucky Libraries.
- Mayors of Lexington, Kentucky: Scotty Baesler, Teresa Isaac, Pam Miller, Jim Newberry. [S.l.]: General Books. 2010. ISBN 1158517882.

Political offices
Preceded by Scotty Baesler	Mayor of Lexington, Kentucky; 1993–2003	Succeeded by Teresa Isaac
