= H. Foster Pettit =

American politician (1930–2014)

Secretary of the Kentucky Public Protection and Regulation Cabinet
- In office December 13, 1979 – August 21, 1981
- Governor: John Y. Brown Jr.
- Preceded by: Russell McDaniel
- Succeeded by: Tracy Farmer

Mayor of Lexington
- In office January 17, 1974 – January 2, 1978
- Preceded by: Himself
- Succeeded by: James G. Amato
- In office January 3, 1972 – January 1, 1974
- Preceded by: Charles Wylie
- Succeeded by: Himself

Member of the Kentucky House of Representatives from the 53rd district
- In office January 21, 1964 – January 1, 1970
- Preceded by: Harry W. Wood (redistricting)
- Succeeded by: William G. Kenton

Personal details
- Born: August 24, 1930 Lexington, Kentucky, U.S.
- Died: November 22, 2014 (aged 84) Hammond, Louisiana, U.S.
- Party: Democratic
- Spouses: Marion Gregory (m. 1957; div. 1981) Carole Thomas (m. 1981; died 2002) Brenda Kraak (m. 2003)
- Children: 4
- Education: University of Virginia (BA, JD)

Harrison Foster Pettit (August 24, 1930 – November 22, 2014) was an American attorney and politician who was the mayor of Lexington, Kentucky from 1972 to 1978. First elected to be mayor of Lexington proper, he was elected to a second term in 1973 as the first mayor of the merged government of Lexington and Fayette County. He was previously a member of the Kentucky House of Representatives from 1964 to 1970.

== Early life ==
Harrison Foster Pettit was born on August 24, 1930, in Lexington, Kentucky, to Dunster Foster and William Pettit. He was a graduate of Woodberry Forest School in Madison County, Virginia, followed by a bachelor's degree and juris doctor from the University of Virginia in 1956 and 1958, respectively.

== Political career ==
Pettit was first elected to represent the 53rd district of the Kentucky House of Representatives in a special election held January 16, 1964. The election was called to fill the vacant term of representative-elect R. P. Moloney, whose death in December occurred after the election but before the term began. He was reelected to full terms in 1965 and 1967; he declined to seek a fourth term in 1969. For his service in the 1968 General Assembly, the Frankfort press corps named him the "most valuable" member of the house of that year.

In 1971, Pettit was elected mayor of Lexington, easily defeating his opponent Harry Sykes with 60 percent of the vote. The following year, voters in Fayette County approved a merged government with the city of Lexington; Pettit and county judge Robert F. Stephens were prominent advocates for the merger. The charter approved by voters moved the election year for mayor two years earlier from 1975 to 1973.

Pettit ran for reelection in 1973, narrowly defeating judge James G. Amato with 50.1 percent of the vote to become the first mayor of the merged government. The result of the election was contested for several months due to a mislabeled election machine in one precinct which swapped votes between the two candidates. The resulting court case was resolved in Pettit's favor by a local judge, and later upheld by the Kentucky Court of Appeals on January 15. Pettit was sworn in to his second term two days later. He was eligible to seek reelection in 1977 but declined to do so.

On December 13, 1979, Pettit was chosen by governor John Y. Brown Jr. to be the state's secretary of the Public Protection and Regulation Cabinet. He resigned from the position on August 21, 1981.

== Personal life and death ==
Pettit was married three times. His first marriage in 1957 was to Marion Hale Gregory, the daughter of Kentucky congressman Noble Gregory. The couple had four children and divorced in 1981. Later that year he married Carole Chestnut (née Thomas), who died in 2002. In 2003, he married Brenda Cummings (née Kraak), who he preceded in death.

Pettit died on November 22, 2014, in Hammond, Louisiana, following a boating accident.

Political offices
Preceded by Charles Wylie	Mayor of Lexington, Kentucky; 1972–1978	Succeeded by James G. Amato
