= Ernesto Scorsone =

American lawyer, politician and judge

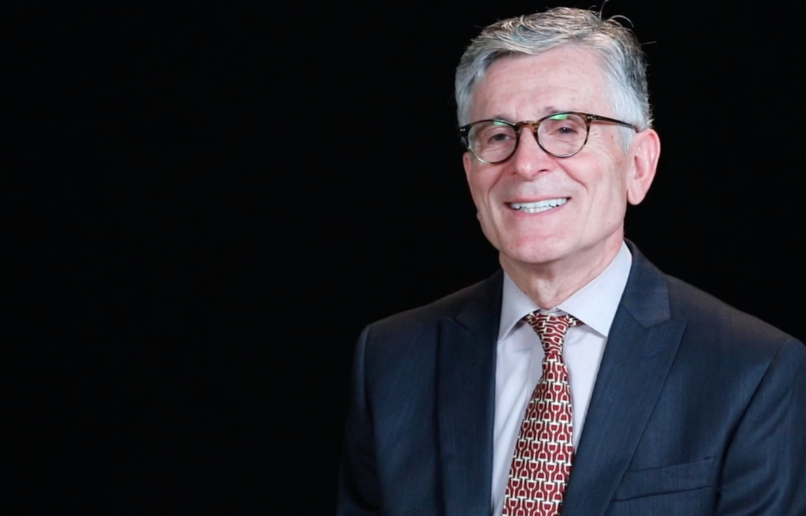
- Scorsone in 2018

Judge of the 22nd Kentucky Circuit Court
- In office August 2008 – November 30, 2021
- Preceded by: Sheila Isaac
- Succeeded by: Jeffrey Taylor

Member of the Kentucky Senate from the 13th district
- In office November 25, 1996 – August 2008
- Preceded by: Mike Moloney
- Succeeded by: Kathy Stein

Member of the Kentucky House of Representatives from the 75th district
- In office January 1, 1985 – November 25, 1996
- Preceded by: Carolyn Kenton
- Succeeded by: Kathy Stein

Personal details
- Born: February 15, 1952 (age 74) Palermo, Sicily, Italy
- Party: Democratic
- Spouse: John Davis
- Education: University of Kentucky (BA); University of Kentucky (JD)

Ernesto M. Scorsone (born February 15, 1952) is an American LGBT advocate, lawyer, politician, and retired judge from Kentucky.

== Early life and career ==
Ernesto Scorsone was born in Palermo, Italy, on February 15, 1952. His family immigrated to the United States in 1960.

Scorsone earned a bachelor's degree from the University of Kentucky in 1973 and a Juris Doctor from the University of Kentucky College of Law in 1976. After a year of public defender work, he began private practice in Lexington in 1977.

== Political career ==
A Democrat, Scorsone was first elected to the Kentucky House of Representatives 1984, defeating Democratic incumbent Carolyn Kenton for renomination. In 1996, he was elected to the Kentucky Senate from the 13th District and re-elected without opposition in 2000 and 2004.

In 1998, Scorsone was the Democratic nominee for the open 6th district in the United States House of Representatives, but he lost the general election to Republican Ernie Fletcher by seven points (53%–46%). Fletcher would go on to be elected Governor.

In the legislature, Scorsone advocated for measures to protect the wellbeing of Kentuckians and to ensure equal treatment for all. Among his accomplishments while serving in the General Assembly:

- Co-sponsored a bill to curb school bullying and helped secure Senate passage after years of legislative defeat, 2008
- Spearheaded efforts to improve the quality of care in nursing homes, 2006
- Championed legislation to reduce junk food and promote physical exercise in schools, 2005
- Helped pass a tough telemarketing law, 2002
- Helped toughen Kentucky's Hate Crime Law, 2000
- Sponsored the School Safety Act, the Children's Health Care Act, the Financial Protection of the Elderly Act, the Custodial Rights Act and the New Crime Act, which mandated violent offenders serve 85% of their sentences, 1996
- Secured funding in the state budget for a drug court program in Fayette County, 1996
- Led advocacy for health care reform, sponsored legislation to guarantee minority representation on school superintendent selection committees, 1994
- Was primary sponsor of Living Will legislation and a bill requiring insurance companies to cover screening mammograms, 1990
- Chaired a task force that recommended creating Family Courts in Kentucky, 1988. Helped obtain state funding for Kentucky's first Family Court.

In November 2007 he was named to Governor-elect Steve Beshear's transition team.

His leadership on LGBT issues has been extensive and has marked much of his career. He led the legal battle to overturn Kentucky's sodomy statute and a successful legislative fight against a constitutional amendment to reinstate the law. Scorsone successfully worked to amend the state's penal code to include, the first time, a hate crime provision based on sexual orientation and helped organize the campaign for a fairness ordinance in Lexington to protect employment, housing and accommodation.{citation needed} He successfully petitioned and helped draft a gubernatorial executive order in 2003 protecting LGBT state employees from job discrimination.

== Kentucky circuit court judge ==
On August 7, 2008, Governor Steve Beshear appointed Scorsone as Fayette Circuit Court Judge. In November of that year, he was elected to the post without opposition. Among other accomplishments as a circuit judge, he initiated a conciliation conference process to avoid home foreclosures in Fayette County.

In March 2016, the Kentucky Department of Health and Family Service's claim, as argued by Louisville attorney and general counsel to the Kentucky office of Kentucky's governor Matt Bevin, that the clinic was operating in unsanitary conditions and conducting abortions without an ambulance agreement, which both health inspection and an ambulance agreement are both required of all facilities that solely perform abortions. The defense attorney, Mr. Scott White, asserted that the EMW provides other necessary women's care that would classify the clinic as a general health facility, not an abortion clinic, including providing mammograms and other care.

The inspection that reported the unsanitary conditions was initiated by an anonymous call to the Kentucky Department of Health and Family Services. The testimony from the two inspectors later disclosed to the attorney for EMW of Lexington, Mr. Scott White, later revealed that the anonymous call was from the office of the governor, Matt Bevin, and whose office instructed the inspectors not to return without finding something. Judge Scorsone denied the Kentucky Department of Health and Family Service's request for a temporary injunction to close the EMW Women's Clinic, citing the undue burden to the people's right to have an abortion and the closure of the clinic would have a disproportional impact to Kentucky by the clinic being only one of two facilities that will provide an abortion within the state. This ruling was subsequently overturned by a unanimous decision by the Kentucky Court of Appeals, ruling that "the circuit court's findings and conclusions are clearly erroneous" and that the case was not about "seeking to prevent women from obtaining abortions," but instead was about the state's right to "regulate the manner in which abortions are performed in this commonwealth."

In May 2017, Judge Scorsone held a hearing upon a defendant's pre-trial motion asserting an applied challenge to the death penalty brought forth within Commonwealth of Kentucky v. Travis Bredhold, who was 18 years and 5 months old when he was charged in 2013 with murder and robbery in the fatal shooting of a Marathon gas station attendant. The pre-trial motion brought forth by the defense counsel asserted that the evolving standards of science have produced evidence that those under twenty-one (21) years of age is still ongoing with mental development, including both in rational and emotional mental faculties. Therefore, in light of the scientific evidence, the evolving standards of decency would preclude the death penalty within the Commonwealth's case since the defendant was under the age of twenty-one (21) years old at the time of the crime. In August 2017, Judge Scorsone issued an order ruling in favor of the motion declaring the death penalty unconstitutional. Judge Scorsone also applied the decision consistently to other cases involving similar defendants, including a case against Justin Smith and Efain Dias, who, along with juvenile co-defendant Roman Gonzales, who is being tried as an adult, were indicted in the murder of University of Kentucky student and Kentucky Kernel photographer, Jonathan Krueger, in the course of a robber on Maxwell Street in 2015. Bredhold's defense team asked Scorsone to extend that exclusion to people 21 and younger. Prosecutors argued that the death penalty is constitutional and argued that there is no national consensus with respect to offenders under 21.

"Contrary to the commonwealth’s assertion, it appears there is a very clear national consensus trending toward restricting the death penalty, especially in cases where defendants are 18 to 21 years of age," Scorsone wrote in his opinion. The judge cited research showing that 18- to 21-year-olds are less culpable for the same reasons that the U.S. Supreme Court found teens under 18 to be. The age group lacks maturity to control their impulses and fully consider risks, making them unlikely to be deterred by knowledge of likelihood and severity of punishment, the judge wrote. In addition, they are susceptible to peer pressure and emotional influence. And their character is not yet well formed, "meaning that they have a much better chance at rehabilitation than do adults," the judge wrote. "Given the national trend toward restricting the use of the death penalty for young offenders, and given the recent studies by the scientific community, the death penalty would be an unconstitutionally disproportionate punishment for crimes committed by individuals under 21 years of age," Scorsone wrote.

In 2018, the Kentucky Supreme Court bypassed the Kentucky Court of Appeals to grant cert upon the question and to hear the case. While the case is still pending, Travis Bredhold's trial is now set to begin June 1, 2020. The judge blocked off four weeks for the trial.

Judge Scorsone swore in Lexington's new mayor, Linda Gorton, at the University of Kentucky on January 6, 2019.

== Civic activities ==
Scorsone's civic activities include service with numerous organizations that support the Lexington/Fayette County community and its citizens as well as Kentuckians' interests statewide. He has particularly focused on issues related to health care, gender bias and LGBT initiatives. He was a founder of JustFundKY, a nonprofit education organization, and led the organization's fundraising campaign that created an endowment of more than $1 million to fund anti-discrimination efforts in Kentucky.

== Recognition ==
Scorsone has been recognized by the Kentucky Human Rights Commission (named to the Civil Rights Hall of Fame), the Kentucky Conference for Community and Justice, the American Heart Association, the Bluegrass Chapter of the Kentucky Fairness Alliance, the Kentucky Association of Criminal Defense Lawyers and was designated "One of Ten Best Legislators" by the Lexington Herald-Leader. He is a recipient of the Charles W. Anderson Medal, named for Kentucky's first African-American legislator to recognize an extraordinary commitment to freedom and justice.

== Electoral history ==
=== 1984 ===
Democratic primary results
Party	Candidate	Votes	%
Democratic	Ernesto Scorsone	1,655	57.7
Democratic	Carolyn L. Kenton (incumbent)	1,213	42.3
Total votes		2,868	100.0

1984 Kentucky House of Representatives 75th district election
Party	Candidate	Votes	%
Democratic	Ernesto Scorsone	6,444	63.0
Republican	Albert "Al" Arbogast	3,788	37.0
Total votes		10,232	100.0
Democratic hold			

=== 1986 ===
1986 Kentucky House of Representatives 75th district election
Party	Candidate	Votes	%
Democratic	Ernesto Scorsone (incumbent)	3,410	99.9
Write-in		3	0.1
Total votes		3,413	100.0
Democratic hold			

=== 1988 ===
1988 Kentucky House of Representatives 75th district election
Party	Candidate	Votes	%
Democratic	Ernesto Scorsone (incumbent)	5,422	63.8
Republican	Albert "Al" Arbogast	2,985	35.1
Write-in		91	1.1
Total votes		8,498	100.0
Democratic hold			

=== 1990 ===
1990 Kentucky House of Representatives 75th district election
Party	Candidate	Votes	%
Democratic	Ernesto Scorsone (incumbent)	Unopposed	
Total votes		3,165	100.0
Democratic hold			

=== 1992 ===
1992 Kentucky House of Representatives 75th district election
Party	Candidate	Votes	%
Democratic	Ernesto Scorsone (incumbent)	7,106	89.7
Libertarian	Geoffrey Gilmore	817	10.3
Total votes		7,923	100.0
Democratic hold			

=== 1994 ===
1994 Kentucky House of Representatives 75th district election
Party	Candidate	Votes	%
Democratic	Ernesto Scorsone (incumbent)	Unopposed	
Total votes		3,108	100.0
Democratic hold			

=== 1996 ===
==== Special election ====
1996 Kentucky Senate 13th district special election
Party	Candidate	Votes	%
Democratic	Ernesto Scorsone	14,533	60.0
Republican	N. Mitchell Meade	9,686	40.0
Total votes		24,219	100.0
Democratic hold			

==== Regular election ====
1996 Kentucky Senate 13th district election
Party	Candidate	Votes	%
Democratic	Ernesto Scorsone	18,262	61.1
Republican	N. Mitchell Meade	11,639	38.9
Total votes		29,901	100.0
Democratic hold			

=== 1998 ===
Democratic primary results
Party	Candidate	Votes	%
Democratic	Ernesto Scorsone	26,653	24.0
Democratic	John A. "Eck" Rose	23,543	21.2
Democratic	Teresa Ann Isaac	17,611	15.9
Democratic	Bobby Russell	16,654	15.0
Democratic	Jim Newberry	13,065	11.8
Democratic	Jonathan Miller	12,240	11.0
Democratic	Scott Land	1,155	1.0
Total votes		110,921	100.0

1998 Kentucky's 6th congressional district election
Party	Candidate	Votes	%
Republican	Ernie Fletcher	104,046	53.1
Democratic	Ernesto Scorsone	90,033	46.0
U.S. Taxpayers' Party	Wasley S. Krogdahl	1,839	0.9
Total votes		195,918	100.0
Republican gain from Democratic			

=== 2000 ===
2000 Kentucky Senate 13th district election
Party	Candidate	Votes	%
Democratic	Ernesto Scorsone (incumbent)	Unopposed	
Total votes		20,729	100.0
Democratic hold			

=== 2004 ===
2004 Kentucky Senate 13th district election
Party	Candidate	Votes	%
Democratic	Ernesto Scorsone (incumbent)	Unopposed	
Total votes		29,055	100.0
Democratic hold			

=== 2008 ===
2008 22nd Kentucky Circuit Court, 7th division special election
Party	Candidate	Votes	%
Nonpartisan	Ernesto Scorsone (incumbent)	Unopposed	
Total votes		78,376	100.0

=== 2014 ===
2014 22nd Kentucky Circuit Court, 7th division election
Party	Candidate	Votes	%
Nonpartisan	Ernesto Scorsone (incumbent)	Unopposed	
Total votes		55,437	100.0

== See also ==
- List of LGBT jurists in the United States
