= Mike Moloney (politician) =

American politician

Member of the Kentucky Senate from the 13th district
- In office January 1, 1972 – July 31, 1996
- Preceded by: Robert Flynn
- Succeeded by: Ernesto Scorsone

Personal details
- Born: January 25, 1941 (age 85) Lexington, Kentucky, U.S.
- Party: Democratic

Michael R. Moloney (born January 25, 1941) was an American politician in the state of Kentucky. He served in the Kentucky Senate as a Democrat from 1972 to 1996. He is a lawyer. On June 15, 1972, Moloney was one of 20 Democratic senators that voted for Kentucky to ratify the Equal Rights Amendment.
