= Kathy Stein =

American politician from Kentucky (born 1955)

Kentucky 22nd Circuit Court 6th Division
- In office October 21, 2013 – February 2, 2022
- Preceded by: Jo Wise
- Succeeded by: Carl Devine

Member of the Kentucky Senate from the 13th district
- In office January 1, 2009 – October 14, 2013
- Preceded by: Ernesto Scorsone
- Succeeded by: Reggie Thomas

Member of the Kentucky House of Representatives from the 75th district
- In office January 1, 1997 – January 1, 2009
- Preceded by: Ernesto Scorsone
- Succeeded by: Kelly Flood

Personal details
- Born: 31 January 1955 (age 71) Birmingham, Alabama, United States
- Party: Democratic
- Education: University of Virginia's College at Wise (BA); University of Kentucky (JD)

Kathy Wright Stein (born January 31, 1955) is an attorney, former member of the Kentucky General Assembly and retired circuit court judge. She served in the Kentucky House of Representatives from 1997 to 2009 before being elected to represent the 13th Kentucky Senate district in 2009, serving until 2013 when she was appointed to the Kentucky 22nd Circuit Court 6th Division by Kentucky Governor Steve Beshear.

Stein was a member of the Women's Political Caucus, the Criminal Justice Council, and the Governor's Council on Domestic Violence and Sexual Abuse. During her time in the Kentucky General Assembly, she became known as a "progressive crusader" who supported women's rights and LGBT rights.

== Personal life and education ==
Stein was born in Birmingham, Alabama, in 1955. She attended Clinch Valley College of the University of Virginia, now known as University of Virginia's College at Wise, to receive her Bachelor of Arts in 1974. The year after her graduation, she worked as the town of Wise, Virginia's treasurer and clerk. She completed some studies at Virginia Tech, and she earned her Juris Doctor from the University of Kentucky College of Law in 1983. She is a retired family judge for Fayette County, Kentucky.
