= William G. Kenton =

American politician (1941–1981)

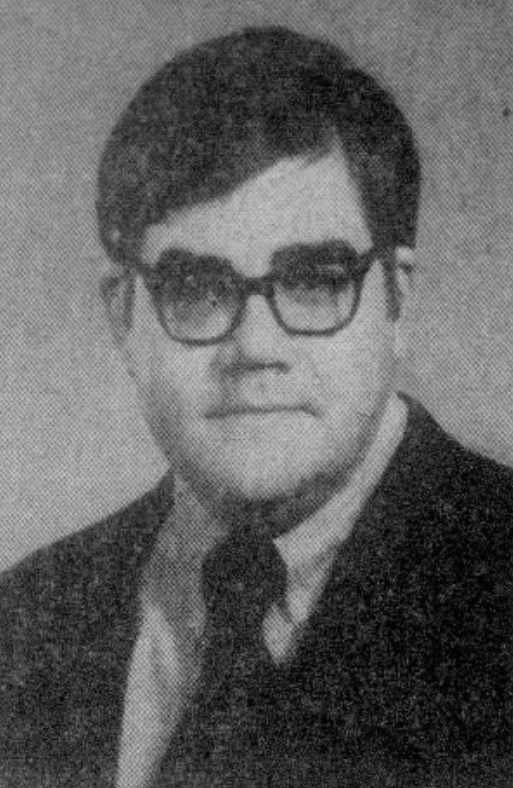
- Kenton, c. 1975

87th Speaker of the Kentucky House of Representatives
- In office January 6, 1976 – November 5, 1981
- Preceded by: Norbert Blume
- Succeeded by: Bobby H. Richardson

Member of the Kentucky House of Representatives
- In office January 1, 1970 – November 5, 1981
- Preceded by: H. Foster Pettit
- Succeeded by: Carolyn Kenton
- Constituency: 53rd district (1970–1972); 75th district (1972–1981)

Personal details
- Born: August 28, 1941 Maysville, Kentucky, U.S.
- Died: November 5, 1981 (aged 40) Lexington, Kentucky, U.S.
- Party: Democratic
- Spouse: Carolyn Kenton
- Relatives: Simon Kenton (great-great-great-granduncle)
- Education: University of Virginia; University of Kentucky

William Gordon Kenton Jr. (October 28, 1941 – November 5, 1981) was an American politician. He served as a Democratic member of the Kentucky House of Representatives.

== Life and career ==
Kenton was born in Maysville, Kentucky. He attended the University of Virginia and the University of Kentucky. His great-great-great-grandfather Mark Kenton (1749–1785) was the brother of noted pioneer Simon Kenton.

Kenton served in the Kentucky House of Representatives from 1970 to 1981.

Kenton died of heart and kidney failure on November 5, 1981, at the age of 40.

Kentucky House of Representatives
Preceded by H. Foster Pettit	Member of the Kentucky House of Representatives from the 53rd district 1970–1972	Succeeded by Randolph Smith
Preceded by James A. Davis	Member of the Kentucky House of Representatives from the 75th district 1972–1981	Succeeded by Carolyn Kenton
