= Kentucky's 13th Senate district =

American legislative district

Kentucky's 13th State Senate district
Senator
Reginald L. Thomas; D–Lexington
since January 7, 2014
- Registration: 57.1% Democratic; 28.8% Republican; 13.3% No party preference
- Demographics: 67.7% White; 14.1% Black; 10.3% Hispanic; 3.6% Asian; 0.3% Other; 4.1% Multiracial
- Population (2023): 123,201
- Registered voters (2025): 87,050

Kentucky's 13th Senatorial district is one of 38 districts in the Kentucky Senate. Located in the central part of the state, it comprises central Lexington. It has been represented by Reginald L. Thomas (D–Lexington) since 2014. As of 2023, the district had a population of 123,201.

== Voter registration ==
On January 1, 2025, the district had 87,050 registered voters, who were registered with the following parties.

Party	Registration	
Party	Voters	%
Democratic	49,694	57.09
Republican	25,037	28.76
Independent	5,951	6.84
Libertarian	539	0.62
Green	135	0.16
Socialist Workers	34	0.04
Constitution	30	0.03
Reform	9	0.01
"Other"	5,621	6.46
Total	87,050	100.00
Source: Kentucky State Board of Elections

== Election results from statewide races ==
=== 2014 – 2020 ===
Year	Office	Results (Note: Figures presented in this table are calculated by summing precinct election results published by the Kentucky State Board of Elections, using precinct data that list each precinct's senatorial district.)
2014	Senator	Grimes 64.1 - 33.4%
2015	Governor	Conway 65.2 - 28.6%
2015	Secretary of State	Grimes 72.1 - 27.9%
2015	Attorney General	Beshear 70.9 - 29.1%
2015	Auditor of Public Accounts	Edelen 71.7 - 28.3%
2015	State Treasurer	Nelson 58.3 - 41.7%
2015	Commissioner of Agriculture	Spann 60.2 - 39.8%
2016	President	Clinton 62.4 - 30.5%
2016	Senator	Gray 70.4 - 29.6%
2019	Governor	Beshear 75.5 - 23.1%
2019	Secretary of State	Henry 73.3 - 26.7%
2019	Attorney General	Stumbo 70.5 - 29.5%
2019	Auditor of Public Accounts	Donahue 67.3 - 29.1%
2019	State Treasurer	Bowman 65.6 - 34.4%
2019	Commissioner of Agriculture	Conway 62.0 - 34.7%
2020	President	No data (Note: Precinct results were not released for Fayette County in 2020.)
2020	Senator	No data
2020	Amendment 1	No data
2020	Amendment 2	No data

=== 2022 – present ===
Year	Office	Results
2022	Senator	Booker 68.7 - 31.3%
2022	Amendment 1	No 75.1 - 24.9%
2022	Amendment 2	No 80.1 - 19.9%
2023	Governor	Beshear 78.5 - 21.5%
2023	Secretary of State	Wheatley 60.9 - 39.1%
2023	Attorney General	Stevenson 70.1 -29.9%
2023	Auditor of Public Accounts	Reeder 63.3 - 36.7%
2023	State Treasurer	Bowman 69.8 - 30.2%
2023	Commissioner of Agriculture	Enlow 68.7 - 31.3%
2024	President	Harris 65.5 - 32.3%
2024	Amendment 1	No 53.2 - 46.8%
2024	Amendment 2	No 76.2 - 23.8%

== List of members representing the district ==
Member	Party	Years	Electoral history	District location
Robert D. Flynn (Lexington)	Republican	January 1, 1968 – January 1, 1972	Elected in 1967. Lost reelection.	1964–1972
Mike Moloney (Lexington)	Democratic	January 1, 1972 – July 31, 1996	Elected in 1971. Reelected in 1975. Reelected in 1979. Reelected in 1983. Reelected in 1988. Reelected in 1992. Resigned after moving outside of the district.	1972–1974
Mike Moloney (Lexington)	Democratic	January 1, 1972 – July 31, 1996	Elected in 1971. Reelected in 1975. Reelected in 1979. Reelected in 1983. Reelected in 1988. Reelected in 1992. Resigned after moving outside of the district.	1974–1984
Mike Moloney (Lexington)	Democratic	January 1, 1972 – July 31, 1996	Elected in 1971. Reelected in 1975. Reelected in 1979. Reelected in 1983. Reelected in 1988. Reelected in 1992. Resigned after moving outside of the district.	1984–1993; Fayette County (part).
Mike Moloney (Lexington)	Democratic	January 1, 1972 – July 31, 1996	Elected in 1971. Reelected in 1975. Reelected in 1979. Reelected in 1983. Reelected in 1988. Reelected in 1992. Resigned after moving outside of the district.	1993–1997
Ernesto Scorsone (Lexington)	Democratic	November 25, 1996 – August 7, 2008	Elected to finish Moloney's term and also to the next term in 1996. Reelected in 2000. Reelected in 2004. Resigned to become a Judge of the 22nd Circuit Court.	1993–1997
Ernesto Scorsone (Lexington)	Democratic	November 25, 1996 – August 7, 2008	Elected to finish Moloney's term and also to the next term in 1996. Reelected in 2000. Reelected in 2004. Resigned to become a Judge of the 22nd Circuit Court.	1997–2003
Ernesto Scorsone (Lexington)	Democratic	November 25, 1996 – August 7, 2008	Elected to finish Moloney's term and also to the next term in 1996. Reelected in 2000. Reelected in 2004. Resigned to become a Judge of the 22nd Circuit Court.	2003–2015
Kathy Stein (Lexington)	Democratic	January 1, 2009 – October 14, 2013	Elected in 2008. Reelected in 2012. Resigned to become a Judge of the 22nd Circuit Court.	2003–2015
Reginald L. Thomas (Lexington)	Democratic	January 7, 2014 – present	Elected to finish Stein's term. Reelected in 2016. Reelected in 2020. Reelected in 2024.	2003–2015
Reginald L. Thomas (Lexington)	Democratic	January 7, 2014 – present	Elected to finish Stein's term. Reelected in 2016. Reelected in 2020. Reelected in 2024.	2015–2023
Reginald L. Thomas (Lexington)	Democratic	January 7, 2014 – present	Elected to finish Stein's term. Reelected in 2016. Reelected in 2020. Reelected in 2024.	2023–present
