= Carolyn Kenton =

American politician (born 1941)

Member of the Kentucky House of Representatives from the 75th district
- In office January 26, 1982 – January 1, 1985
- Preceded by: William G. Kenton
- Succeeded by: Ernesto Scorsone

Personal details
- Born: 1941 (age 84–85)
- Party: Democratic

Carolyn Lips Kenton (born 1941) is an American politician from Kentucky who was a member of the Kentucky House of Representatives from 1982 to 1985. Kenton was elected to the house in a January 1982 special election following the death of her husband, incumbent representative William G. Kenton. She was defeated for renomination for a full term in 1984 by Ernesto Scorsone.
