= Kelly Flood =

American politician (born 1959)

Member of the Kentucky House of Representatives from the 75th district
- In office January 1, 2009 – January 1, 2023
- Preceded by: Kathy Stein
- Succeeded by: Lindsey Burke

Personal details
- Born: April 14, 1959 (age 67)
- Party: Democratic
- Education: Starr King School for the Ministry; Florida State University
- Website: kellyflood.com

Kelly Marie Flood (born April 14, 1959) is an American politician and a Democratic member of the Kentucky House of Representatives representing District 75 from 2009 to 2023.

== Education ==
Flood attended Starr King School for the Ministry and earned her BA in American studies from Florida State University.

== Elections ==
- 2008 When District 75 Representative Kathy Stein was nominated for the Kentucky Senate months after the May primary election, Flood was nominated for the House of Representatives seat by the Democratic party's precinct representatives. She won the November 4, 2008 General election with 8,740 votes (65.0%) against Republican nominee Kimberly Ward.
- 2010 Flood was unopposed for both the May 18, 2010 Democratic Primary and the November 2, 2010 General election, winning with 6,918 votes.
- 2012 Flood was unopposed for both the May 22, 2012 Democratic Primary and the November 6, 2012 General election, winning with 9,870 votes.
- 2014 Flood was unopposed in both the primary and general elections.
- 2016 Flood was unopposed in the Democratic primary, and defeated Republican Gary McCollum.
- 2018 Flood was unopposed in both the primary and general elections, with a total of 11,258 votes.
