= Abraham Hunt =

American merchant and farmer (1741–1821)

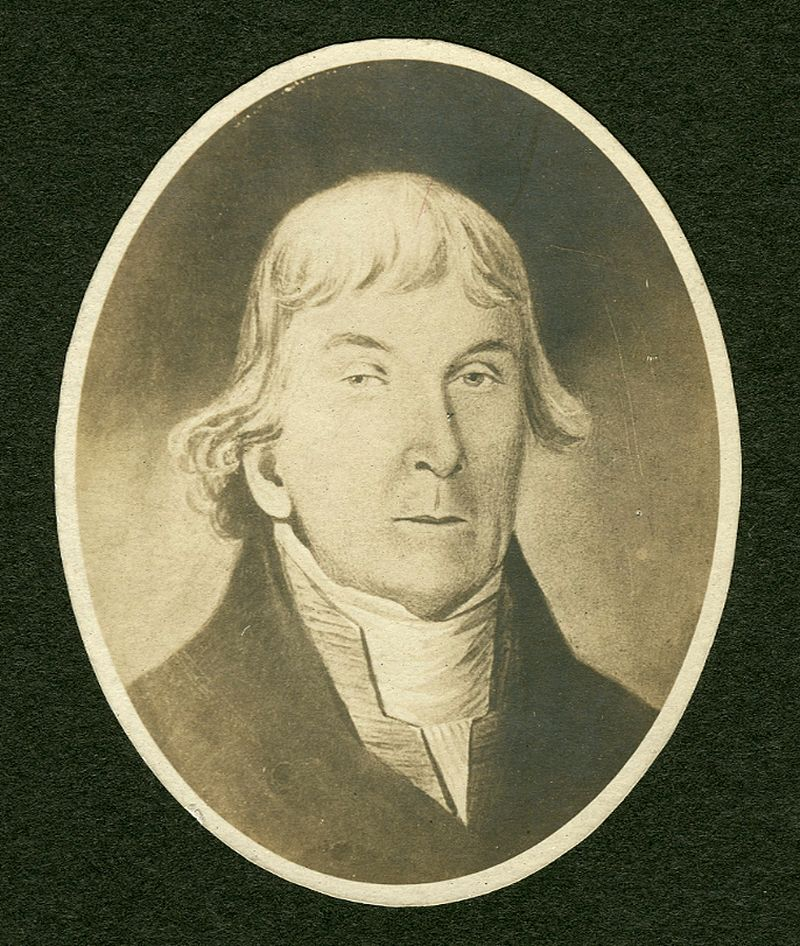
- Born: February 16, 1741; Hopewell, Province of New Jersey, British America
- Died: October 27, 1821 (aged 80)
- Children: 4, including Wilson Price Hunt and John W.
- Relatives: Charlton Hunt (grandson)
- Military career
- Allegiance: United States
- Rank: Lieutenant Colonel
- Unit: Hunterton County militia
- Conflicts: French and Indian War; American Revolutionary War

Abraham Hunt (1741–1821) was an American merchant and farmer in Trenton, New Jersey, first Postmaster of Trenton, and served in the American Revolutionary War as a Lieutenant Colonel in the Hunterton County militia. He was a prominent member of the First Presbyterian Church in Trenton. Early in the revolution he was a member of the Provincial Congress that held some of its sessions in Trenton. He played the host and placated the German Hessian commander Johann Rall before the Battle of Trenton. Suspected of duplicity for his accommodation to the Hessians, Hunt was charged with treason, but was acquitted and went on to serve in the cause for American independence. After the war, Hunt became involved in the politics and business interests of Trenton and New Jersey.

== Early years ==
Hunt was the second oldest among five children of his father, Wilson Hunt (1714–1782), and mother, Susannah Price Hunt (1715–1783). He was born on February 16, 1741, and raised on their farm in Hopewell Township in New Jersey. He married Theodosia Pearson on February 21, 1764, in Hopewell. Their marriage brought all Hunt's four children, Pearson, Wilson Price, John W., and Theodore Hunt. Sometime after Theodosia died in 1784. Hunt married Mary Dagworthy, the sister of General John Dagworthy, where she taught school in a building on South Broad Street later known as the Eagle Hotel.

After the French and Indian War, in 1763, Hunt became a successful merchant and leading citizen of Trenton, New Jersey. In 1764, at the age of twenty-one, Hunt joined in partnership with Moore Furman and together they established the merchant firm of Furman and Hunt, in Trenton. The firm quickly prospered and came to dominate river trade on the Trenton-Philadelphia. Hunt became a wealthy land owner and the principal merchant in Trenton who conducted a successful business in general merchandise from a shop connected with his home on the corner of King and Second Streets. In 1770 Hunt served as a commissioner for purposes of improving navigation on the Delaware River. As hostilities between the colonists and Britain increased in the early 1770s hunt was active in leading some of the protests.

Beginning in 1769, Hunt served on the Board of trusties of the First First Presbyterian Church, in Trenton. The original church was built in 1712. When a new church was built in Trenton, Hunt was one of the largest contributors for the property and its construction. The cornerstone was laid on April 15, 1805.

On January 10, 1764, Benjamin Franklin, serving as postmaster general of the colonies for the King of Great Britain, commissioned Hunt as Trenton's postmaster. In 1770 Hunt was appointed barrack master, and in 1774 became a member of the New Jersey Committee of Correspondence. In 1775 Franklin for the second time appointed Hunt as Trenton's Postmaster.

== American Revolution ==
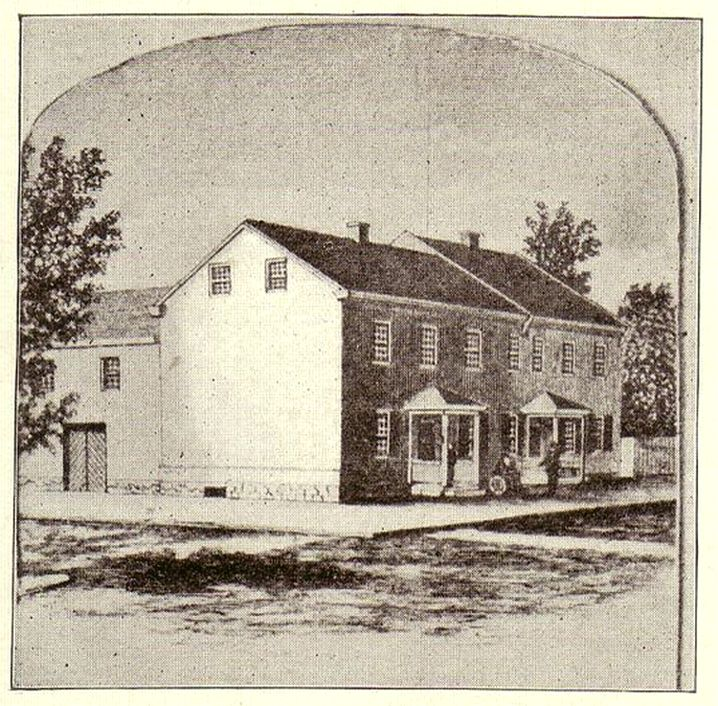
House of Abraham Hunt, where he entertained Hessian commander Johann Rall, Christmas night, 1776

Hunt was a member of and participated in the four sessions of the Provincial Congress, which were held in Trenton, New Jersey, in May, August and October 1775, and in the seventh session held in Trenton beginning July 5, 1776. Hunt was also among the men from Hunterdon County and Trenton who played an active role in the preliminary agitation and also served on the first General Committee of Correspondence appointed by the Provincial Assembly, July 21, 1774.

A meeting of Hunterdon county residents was held on July 8, 1774, at the house of John Ringo in Amwell, with Samuel Tucker as chairman. Tucker expressed his loyalty to King George III, but nevertheless protested against infringement on colonial rights, and appointed Hunt and several others to a committee for the purpose of uniting with the other counties in choosing delegates to Congress.

By the time Hunt had joined the American Revolutionary War, he had already established himself with the rebels, serving on the local Committee of Correspondence. Additionally, at the time he held the commission of Lieutenant Colonel in Colonel Isaac Smith's First Regiment, Hunterdon County Militia. None of the records indicate that Hunt was anything but an exemplary officer when he was serving on active duty.

Hunt, along with Samuel Tucker, Joseph Ellis and Alexander Chambers, were appointed commissioners of the County of Hunterdon, when the Declaration of Independence was declared in 1776. His duties included the disbursement of funds for the purchase of supplies and firearms and pay the militia. Hunt also acted in this capacity in July 1777,. Historian Hamilton Schuyler maintains that being entrusted with such a responsibility would be consistent with Hunt's loyalty to the Patriots and not consistent with the idea that he was under suspicion.

In mid December 1776, Hessian commander Johann Rall and his brigade of Hessian soldiers marched on Trenton and took control of the town. On Christmas evening Rall attended a celebration at Hunt's residence in Trenton. In an apparent effort to render the commander less than capable for military duty Hunt supplied Rall and his officers with plenty of food and drink into the late hours of the night. Hunt, considered a friendly and accommodating man, was known to freely and openly fraternize with both the Patriots and the British. He lived in a finely furnished home, with a cellar well stocked with the finest wines and liquors, as well as a good stock of heavily fortified beers that the Germans were very fond of. He also had a good stock of the finest Virginia tobacco, all of which Hunt made readily available, and put him in good favor with the Hessian officers. Historian David Hackett Fischer maintains that it is uncertain whether Hunt initially swore allegiance to either the Patriots or the British, and speculates that his noncommittal and all around friendly attitude was all in a precarious effort to protect his property from seizure by the Hessians, while not alienating himself from the American Patriots. His property was never seized by either of the belligerent forces. There is either no record of any papers granting Hunt protection of any kind. The Patriots were especially suspicious because the Colonel Rall of the Hessians had made use of his lavish and abundant provisions during the war, especially just before the Battle of Trenton.

=== Battle of Trenton ===
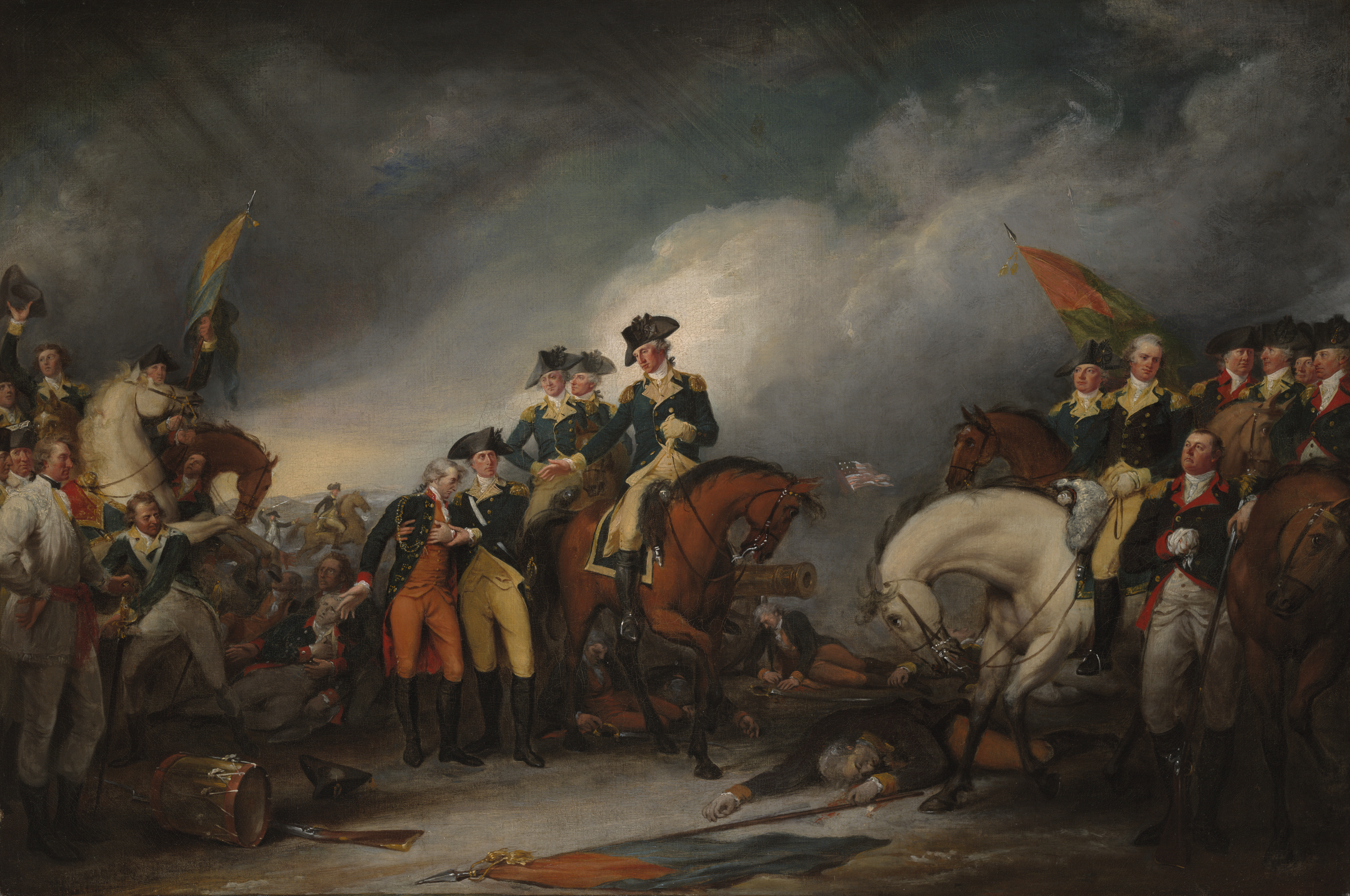
Washington's capture of the Hessians at the Battle of Trenton

The Battle of Trenton was a small but pivotal American Revolutionary War battle that took place on the morning of December 26, 1776, in Trenton, New Jersey. By the time Christmas had approached, the Hessians had been subjected to numerous partisan skirmishes about the outskirts of Trenton, frequent gunfire at night, and numerous false alarms, which had deprived them of sleep since they arrived two weeks prior. On Christmas night a heavy snowfall led Hessian commander Colonel Johann Rall to further assume that no Patriot attack of any consequence would occur. Rall, along with some of his top officers, retired to the home of Abraham Hunt and settled in for a Christmas celebration with food and plenty of drink generously supplied by Hunt, which by some accounts ultimately compromised their ability to up and engage in battle at a moment's notice.

Late in the evening, a Loyalist farmer came calling at Hunt's house for Colonel Rall who was still celebrating and preoccupied with drink and playing cards. One of Hunt's servants answered the call and told the farmer that Rall was too busy with friends to be bothered at that hour, possibly at Hunt's instructions. The farmer then scribbled a note on a scrap of paper, informing Rall that Patriot troops were preparing to cross the Delaware River, and asked that it be given to Rall directly. The farmer retreated feeling he had done his duty and all he could have at that time. Upon receiving the note, Rall slipped it into his vest pocket without reading it and continued with his drinking and card game.

Early in the morning the next day, under cover of darkness and heavy snowfall, General George Washington, along with General Henry Knox had crossed the icy Delaware River with troops, horses and cannon, organized their forces and began marching toward Trenton, where commander Rall and his Hessians mercenaries were still held up at Hunt's residence. During the evening, as Rall and others were still drinking and playing cards, by morning Washington and his troops launched a two-pronged surprise attack. After a touch and go battle the Hessians finally scattered, were outmaneuvered, and were defeated by Washington's forces, where many of them were captured and taken prisoner. During the battle, Rall was shot twice in his side and was mortally wounded. Before he died that evening, Rall requested a formal surrender to Washington. (Note: Rall was given a Christian burial in the Presbyterian Church cemetery, in Trenton.)

After the battle was over, Washington and the Patriot forces never confiscated Hunt's house and property as they would have if Hunt was deemed a Loyalist. For his apparent hospitality to the British and Hessians, however, Hunt faced charges of high treason, but at his trial he was completely exonerated by a grand jury of well-known Patriots because there was only one witness to that effect who could only claim that Hunt was speaking in seditious tones to the Hessians. Hunt continued to be of service to the revolutionary cause. Hunt's trial was featured on the front page of the April 22, 1777, issue of the Pennsylvania Gazette.

== Post war ==
After American independence was established Hunt became a charter member of the Board of Aldermen in 1792 when the city of Trenton was incorporated. He was one of the men appointed that year as the city's legislator. He was also a founder and director of the Trenton Banking Company in 1805. Under the newly formed American government Hunt continued in the office as the Postmaster of Trenton for many years.

In a letter of July 20, 1789, Washington, under the advice of Colonel Thomas Lowrey, wrote to Hunt inquiring about any horses that he might purchase from him. Washington requested that the horses be at least 15 hands high and less than six years old.

On November 13, 1792, the city of Trenton was formed from a part of the township of Trenton giving it corporate city privileges. The New Jersey legislature appointed Hunt and several others as the officers and held their first meeting on December 21, 1792.

== Final years ==
Hunt died on October 27, 1821, at the age of 80. He was buried in the cemetery of the First Presbyterian Church in Trenton, New Jersey. After his death, his business affairs were continued by his grandson, Wesley P. Hunt. In his will, he bequeathed one hundred dollars to the Presbyterian Church, with another hundred dollars to Episcopal Church.

== See also ==
- New York and New Jersey campaign
- Philadelphia campaign
- Valley Forge, Pennsylvania

== Bibliography ==
- Fischer, David Hackett (2006). Washington's Crossing. Oxford University Press. ISBN 0-19-517034-2.
- Flexner, James Thomas (1968). George Washington in the American Revolution, 1775-1783. Boston, Little, Brown. ISBN 978-0-3162-85957.
- Hall, John (Reverend) (1912). History of the Presbyterian Church in Trenton, N.J. : from the first settlement of the town. Trenton, N.J. : MacCrellish & Quigley, printers.
- Ketchum, Richard (1999). The Winter Soldiers: The Battles for Trenton and Princeton (1st Owl books ed.). Holt Paperbacks. ISBN 0-8050-6098-7.
- Kidder, Larry (2013). A people harassed and exhausted : the story of a New Jersey militia regiment in the American Revolution. Kidder Publications. ISBN 978-1-4936-94624.
- Kidder, Larry. "Abraham Hunt". National Heritage: Crossroads of the American revolution.
- Parker, Lewis K. (2002). The Battle of Trenton. San Diego : Blackbirch Press. ISBN 978-1-5671-16205.
- Randall, Willard Sterne (1998). George Washington: A Life. Macmillan. ISBN 978-0-8050-59922. - Google link
- Raum, John O. (1871). History of the city of Trenton, New Jersey. Trenton, N.J. : W.T. Nicholson & Co.
- Schuyler, Hamilton (1929). A history of Trenton, 1679-1929. Princeton : Princeton University Press: The Trenton Historical Society.
- Stryker, William Scudder (1898). The Battles of Trenton and Princeton. Boston : Houghton, Mifflin and Company.
- Tucker, Phillip Thomas (2014). George Washington's surprise attack : a new look at the battle that decided the fate of America. New York, NY : Skyhorse Publishing. ISBN 978-1-6287-36526.
- Stryker, William (March 22, 1884). "A Landmark to go". New Jersey Daily State Gazette. Trenton, New Jersey.
- Washington, George (July 20, 1789). "From George Washington to Abraham Hunt, July 20, 1789". Letter to Hunt, Abraham. National Archives; Founders online.
- Franklin, Benjamin (January 10, 1764). "Post Office Commissions to Abraham Hunt, January 10, 1764 (and October 13, 1775)". Letter to "To All to whom these Presents shall come". National Archives: Founders Online.
- Mandresh, Jason. "Hosting The Enemy For Xmas - Abraham Hunt at Trenton". Founder of the Day.
- "First Presbyterian Church of Trenton". First Presbyterian Church of Trenton. 2020.
- "First Presbyterian Church of Trenton, Founded 1712". Mercer County Cultural and Heritage Commission. June 14, 2014.
