= Reggie Thomas =

American politician

Reginald L. Thomas
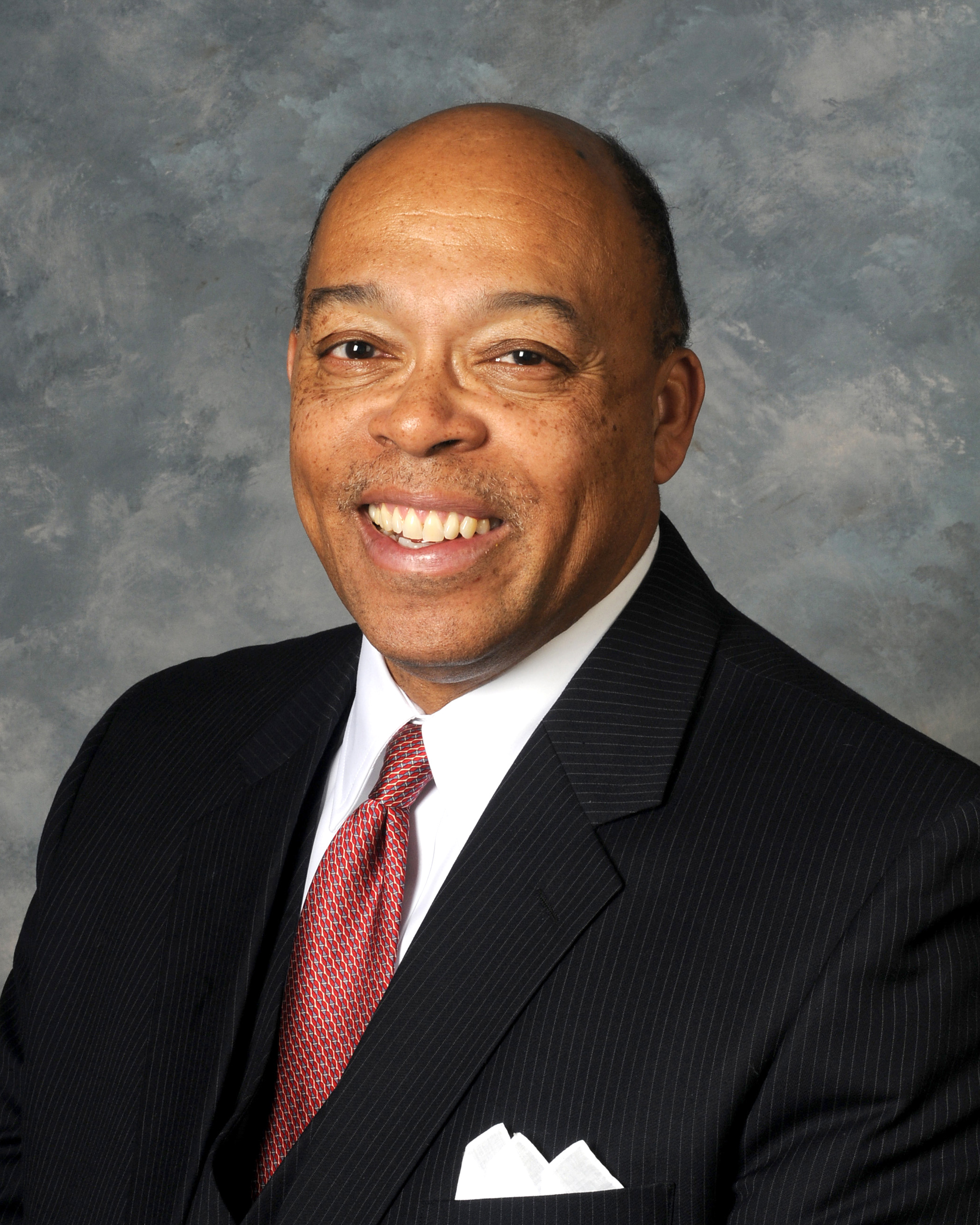
- Official portrait, 2014

Member of the Kentucky Senate from the 13th district
- Incumbent
- Assumed office January 7, 2014
- Preceded by: Kathy Stein

Personal details
- Born: Reginald L. Thomas; May 20, 1953 (age 73)
- Party: Democratic
- Spouse: Lynda Morris Thomas (1980-2015)
- Children: 3
- Education: Dartmouth College; Harvard Law School
- Profession: attorney, law professor
- Website: Reggie Thomas for Congress

Reginald L. Thomas (born May 20, 1953) is an American politician from the state of Kentucky. A member of the Democratic Party, Thomas is a member of the Kentucky Senate and currently serves as the minority caucus chair. Thomas' election in 2013 marked the first time that two African Americans served in the Kentucky Senate concurrently. Thomas is an attorney and law professor; he earned an A.B. degree from Dartmouth College in 1975 and a J.D. degree from Harvard Law School in 1978.

On July 1, 2017, Thomas announced he would challenge Representative Andy Barr in Kentucky's 6th congressional district during the 2018 midterm elections. He lost the Democratic primary to Amy McGrath, who then lost the general election to Barr.

In 2021, Thomas went viral with a TikTok video receiving more than 4 million views of himself singing the song Rick and Morty by Soulja Boy with the caption "Rapping Rick and Morty to the Senate Chambers until we raise the minimum raise in Kentucky".
