= Charlton Hunt =

American lawyer and politician (1801–1836)

Mayor of Lexington, Kentucky
- In office January 12, 1832 – January 12, 1835
- Preceded by: Office established
- Succeeded by: James E. Davis

Personal details
- Born: December 3, 1801
- Died: December 27, 1836 (aged 35)
- Spouse: Rebecca T. Warfield
- Children: 7
- Relatives: John Wesley Hunt (father); Abraham Hunt (grandfather); John Hunt Morgan (nephew); Elisha Warfield (father-in-law)
- Education: Transylvania University

Charlton Hunt (Note: Also spelled Charleton Hunt.) (December 3, 1801 – December 27, 1836) was an American lawyer and politician who served as the first mayor of Lexington, Kentucky following its incorporation.

== Biography ==
Charlton Hunt was born on December 3, 1801, to businessman John Wesley Hunt and his wife Catherine Grosh. His maternal grandmother Mary Charlton was the maternal aunt of Francis Scott Key, writer of "The Star-Spangled Banner" making him his first cousin, once removed. After Hunt graduated with a degree in classical studies at Transylvania University in June 1821, he moved to Frederick, Maryland where he studied law under future Chief Justice Roger B. Taney. In 1824, he married Rebecca T. Warfield, a daughter of Elisha Warfield with whom he had seven children: Elisha, John, Mary, Katherine, Ann, Elizabeth and Rebecca.

Hunt returned to Kentucky in 1822 where he began practicing law in Paris, Kentucky before opening an office in Lexington, Kentucky. In 1832, he was elected as the first mayor of Lexington following its incorporation, receiving almost 6,000 votes from residents. Hunt was inducted on January 12, 1832, in a ceremony at the court house in which he received his oath from Judge T.M. Hickey, before he administered it himself to his fellow councilmen. Hunt was reelected to two more one-year terms in 1833 and 1834 during which the city was hit by a major cholera epidemic and Hunt established the city's first public school, Morton High School named after its sponsor William Morton. Hunt returned to his law practice in 1835 and was described as holding a "prominent position" in his law profession at the time of his death.

Hunt died of scarlet fever at the age of 35 on December 27, 1836, and was buried in Lexington Cemetery. The Louisville Daily Journal wrote that Hunt was a "valuable member of society, and his death has thrown a deep gloom over Lexington". Historian Robert Peter wrote he died as a "future full of promise was opening to him" and that "few men have been more beloved in Lexington." Hunt's Row built in 1836 was named after him by the Lexington City Council.

African American volunteer militia officer Charlton Hunt Tandy was named after him. Hunt's nephew John Hunt Morgan was a Confederate general in the American Civil War and his grandnephew Thomas Hunt Morgan was a biologist and Nobel Prize laureate.

== Sources ==
- Johnson, E. Polk (1912). A History of Kentucky and Kentuckians: The Leaders and Representative Men in Commerce, Industry and Modern Activities: Volume 3. Lewis Publishing Company.
- Peter, Robert (1979). History of Fayette County, Kentucky. Southern Historical Press. ISBN 9780893081638.
- Jackson, Andrew; Smith, Sam B.; Owsley, Harriet Chappell; Moser, Harold D. (2007). The Papers of Andrew Jackson, Volume 7: 1829. University of Tennessee Press. ISBN 9781572335936.
- Ramage, James A. (2014). Rebel Raider: The Life of General John Hunt Morgan. University Press of Kentucky. ISBN 9780813146331.
