= Isaac Smith (New Jersey politician) =

American judge

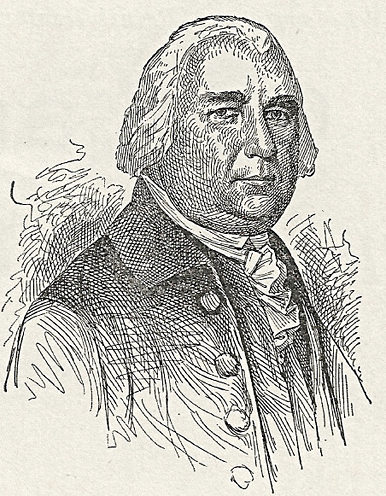

5th President of the Medical Society of New Jersey
- In office 1771–1772
- Preceded by: Nathaniel Scudder
- Succeeded by: James Newell

Member of the U.S. House of Representatives from 's at-large district
- In office March 4, 1794 – March 3, 1797
- Preceded by: Lambert Cadwalader
- Succeeded by: Thomas Sinnickson

Justice of the New Jersey Supreme Court
- In office 1777–1804

Personal details
- Born: 1740 Trenton, New Jersey
- Died: August 29, 1807 (aged 67) Trenton, New Jersey
- Education: Princeton College

Isaac Smith (1740 – August 29, 1807) was a physician, and a United States representative from New Jersey. He was the President of the Medical Society of New Jersey, and an associate justice of the Supreme Court of New Jersey.

== Biography ==
Born in Trenton, New Jersey, he graduated from Princeton College in 1755, was a teacher in that institution from 1755 to 1758, studied medicine, and commenced practice in Trenton. In 1768 he was elected to the American Philosophical Society. He was a colonel in the Hunterdon County Militia in 1776 and 1777, serving with Lieutenant Colonel Abraham Hunt, and was elected as a Federalist to the Fourth Congress, serving from March 4, 1795 to March 3, 1797.

Smith was appointed by President George Washington a commissioner to treat with the Seneca Indians in 1797, and was an associate justice of the Supreme Court of New Jersey from 1777 to 1804. He was the first president of the Trenton Banking Co. from 1805 to 1807. He died in Trenton, New Jersey on August 29, 1807. Interment was in the First Presbyterian Churchyard.

U.S. House of Representatives
Preceded by Lambert Cadwalader	Member of the U.S. House of Representatives from New Jersey's at-large congressional district 1795–1797	Succeeded by Thomas Sinnickson
