= Thomas A. Combs =

American politician

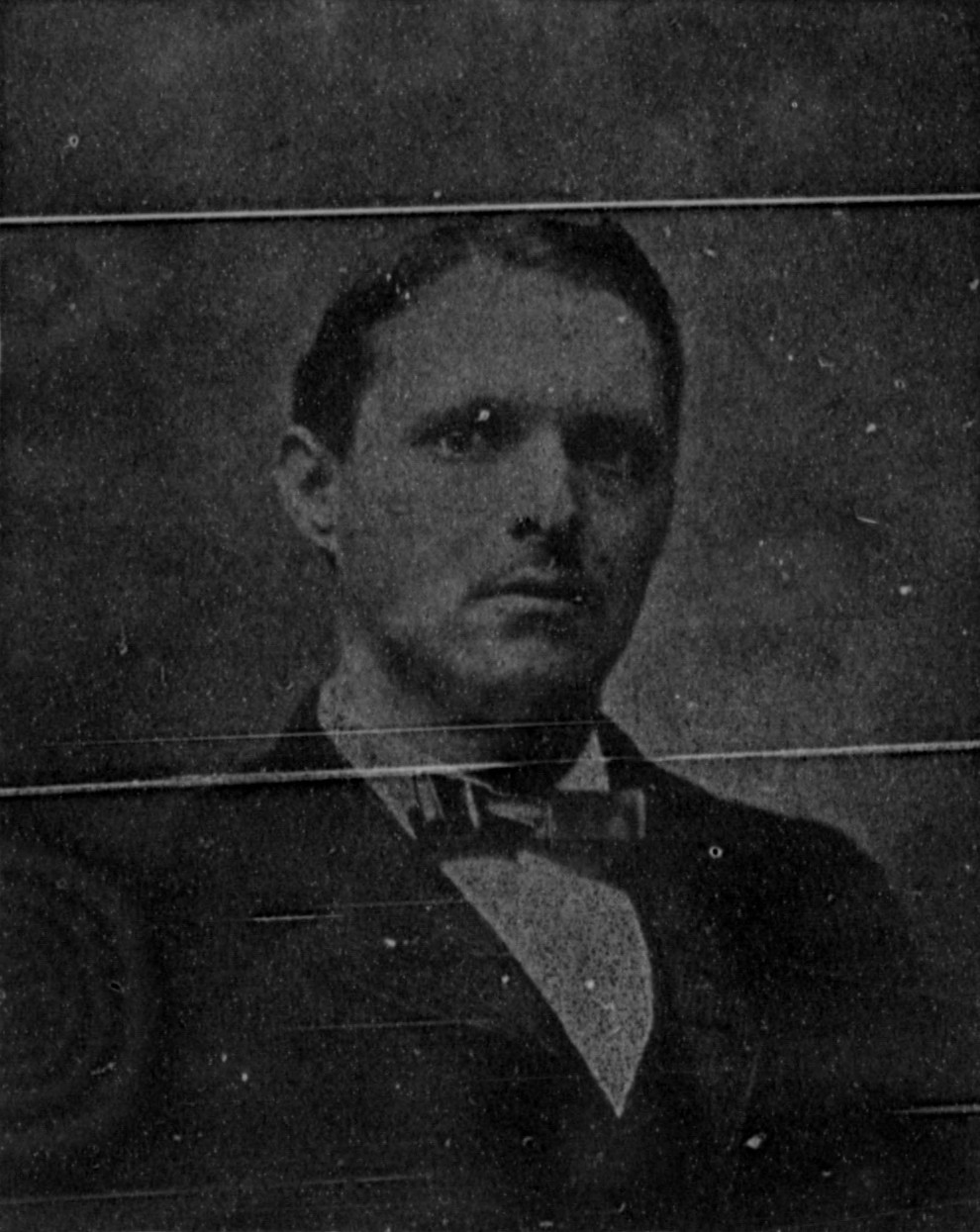

Member of the Kentucky Senate from the 27th district
- In office 1916–1920
- Preceded by: John T. Tunis
- Succeeded by: J. William Stoll
- In office 1908–1912
- Preceded by: J. Embry Allen
- Succeeded by: John T. Tunis

Mayor of Lexington, Kentucky
- In office 1904–1907
- Preceded by: Henry T. Duncan
- Succeeded by: R. B. Waddy

Personal details
- Born: Thomas Asbury Combs; February 25, 1868
- Died: April 7, 1935 (aged 67) Lexington, Kentucky
- Party: Democratic
- Spouse: Vida Downs

Thomas Asbury Combs (February 25, 1868 – April 7, 1935) was an American politician who served as mayor of Lexington, Kentucky from 1904 to 1907 and as a member of the Kentucky Senate from 1908 to 1912 and from 1916 to 1920.

== Biography ==
Combs was born on February 25, 1868, near Jackson, Kentucky, to Alfred and Esther Combs. In 1875, he moved with his parents to Menifee County. He was married to Vida Downs in 1889 and moved to Powell County in 1890. In October 1893, he moved to Lexington and in 1903 was elected mayor of the city. He was elected to the Kentucky Senate In 1907 and 1915. He died at his home in Lexington on April 7, 1935.
