= Linda Gorton =

American politician

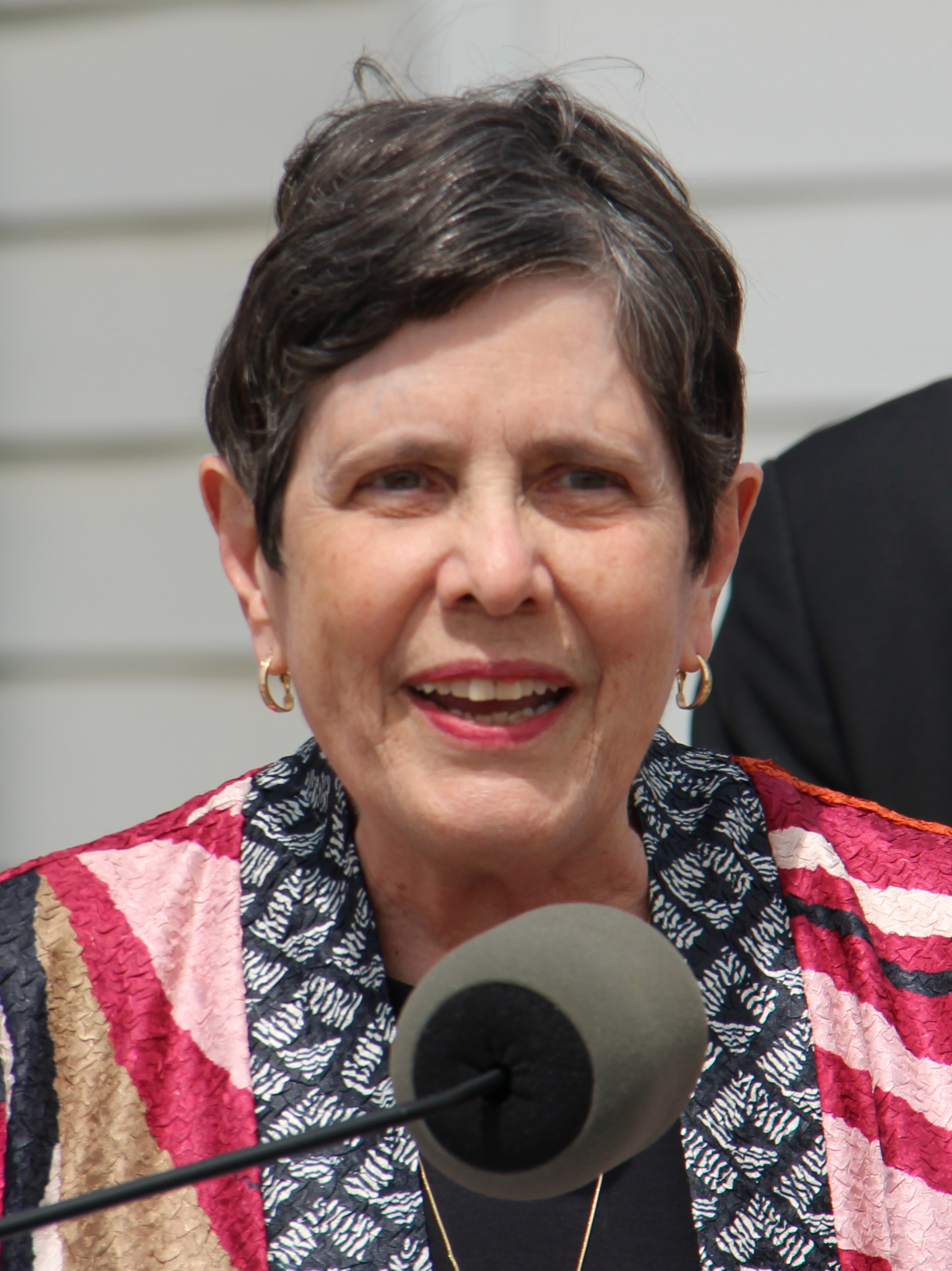
- Gorton in 2026

Mayor of Lexington
- Incumbent
- Assumed office January 7, 2019
- Preceded by: Jim Gray

Member of the Lexington-Fayette Urban County Council
- In office January 4, 1999 – January 5, 2015
- Preceded by: Isabel Yates
- Succeeded by: Multi-member district
- Constituency: 4th district (1999–2007); At-large district (2007–2015)

Personal details
- Born: 1948 (age 77–78)
- Party: Republican
- Education: University of Kentucky (BS)

Linda Gorton (born 1948) is an American politician currently serving as the mayor of Lexington, Kentucky. Gorton previously spent four years as vice mayor and 16 more on the Lexington-Fayette Urban County Council, becoming the longest-serving member of that council. She is also a registered nurse. Gorton was elected mayor in 2018 in a nonpartisan election. She was re-elected in 2022.

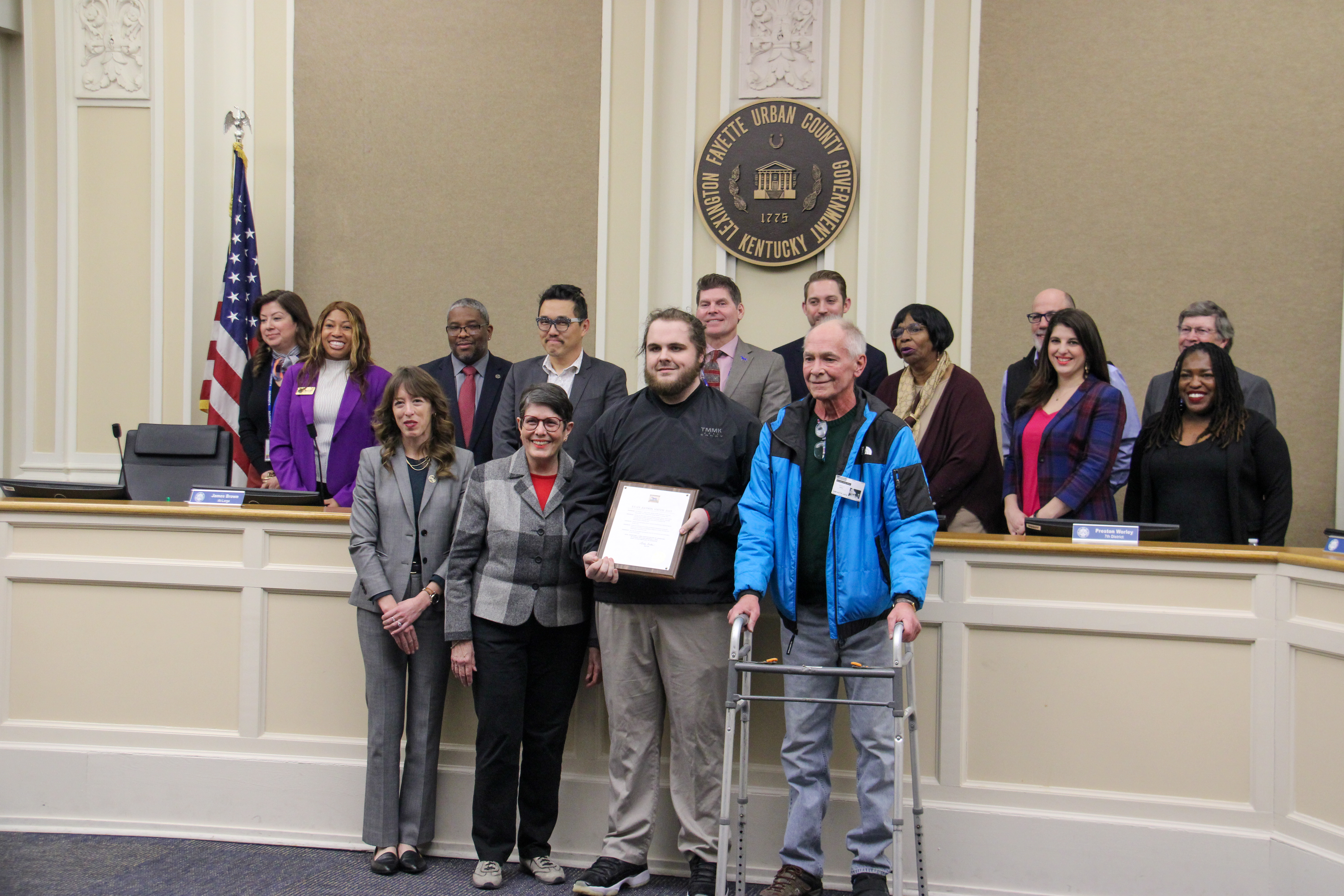
Lexington-Fayette Urban County Council and Mayor Linda Gorton present the Evan Jayson Smith Day Proclamation on February 1, 2024.

== Electoral history ==
Lexington mayoral election 2018, first round results
Candidate	Votes	%
Linda Gorton	23,200	42%
Ronnie Bastin	14,207	26%
Teresa A. Isaac	8,845	16%
Kevin O. Stinnett	7,866	14%
Ike Lawrence	847	2%
William Weyman	326	1%
Skip Horine	315	1%
Total votes	55,606	

Lexington mayoral election 2018, runoff results
Candidate	Votes	%
Linda Gorton	67,480	63%
Ronnie Bastin	40,365	37%
Bryan Garten (write-in)	9	0%
Caroll Montague Price Jr. (write-in)	8	0%
Will McGinnis (write-in)	4	0%
Total votes	107,866	

Lexington mayoral election 2022, first round results
Candidate	Votes	%
Linda Gorton	32,664	71%
David Kloiber	6,436	14%
Adrian Wallace	6,022	13%
William Weyman	830	1%
Total votes	45,952	

Lexington Mayoral Election (Round 2) by Precinct. Gorton won all but one precinct, where she tied with David Kloiber Legend: | Gorton 50–60% 60–70% 70–80% 80–90% | Tie 50% |

Lexington mayoral election 2022, second round results
Candidate	Votes	%
Linda Gorton	67,083	71%
David Kloiber	27,360	29%
Total votes	94,443	

Political offices
Preceded by Jim Gray	Mayor of Lexington; 2019–present	Incumbent
