= Eric Shelton (American football) =

American football player (born 1983)

No. 32
- Position: Running back

Personal information
- Born: June 23, 1983 (age 43); Lexington, Kentucky, U.S.
- Listed height: 6 ft 1 in (1.85 m)
- Listed weight: 246 lb (112 kg)

Career information
- High school: Bryan Station (Lexington)
- College: Louisville
- NFL draft: 2005: 2nd round, 54th overall pick

Career history
- Carolina Panthers (2005–2007); Washington Redskins (2008)*
- * Offseason or practice squad member only

Awards and highlights
- Second-team All-Conference USA (2004)

Career NFL statistics
- Rushing attempts: 8
- Rushing yards: 23
- Rushing touchdowns: 0
- Receptions: 1
- Receiving yards: 6
- Receiving touchdowns: 0
- Stats at Pro Football Reference

Eric Shelton (born June 23, 1983) is an American former professional football player who was a running back in the National Football League (NFL). He was selected by the Carolina Panthers in the second round of the 2005 NFL draft. He played college football for the Louisville Cardinals.

Shelton was also a member of the Washington Redskins.

== Early life ==
Shelton attended Bryan Station High School in Lexington, Kentucky, where he played both running back and linebacker and twice earned state Class 4A Player of the Year honors. He totaled 4,970 yards rushing with 59 touchdowns and 129 tackles with 11 sacks and 41 stops for losses during his career. Shelton was a First-team USA Today and Parade All-American and was also an All-State track performer who competed in the high hurdles, triple jump and 4x100 relay. It was in high school that he met his future wife Shamea. He was on Tom Lemming's Top 100 highschool recruits, ranked at #6 in the nation

== College career ==
=== Florida State ===
Shelton started his collegiate career at Florida State University, where he played one season as a true freshman for the Seminoles. He finished fourth on the team with 29 carries for 130 yards (4.5 avg.) but was disappointed with his playing time and decided to transfer to Louisville. As a result of NCAA transfer rules, however, he was forced to sit out the 2002 season.

=== Louisville ===
Shelton attended the University of Louisville, and in his junior year (in 2004) he led the Cardinals in rushing (938 yards) and touchdowns (20). His touchdown total tied the single season Louisville touchdown record (since broken by Michael Bush with 23 in 2005) and he also tied a Louisville record by rushing for five touchdowns in a game versus East Carolina University. He ranked sixth in the nation with 120 points. In 22 games with the Cardinals, he totaled 1,728 yards on 312 carries (5.5 avg) and had 30 touchdown runs. His 30 touchdowns rank third all time at Louisville despite his only playing two years there.

== Professional career ==
Pre-draft measurables
Height	Weight	Arm length	Hand span	40-yard dash	10-yard split	20-yard split	20-yard shuttle	Three-cone drill	Vertical jump	Broad jump	Bench press
6 ft 1 1/2 in (1.87 m)	246 lb (112 kg)	33 5/8 in (0.85 m)	9 1/2 in (0.24 m)	4.53 s	1.64 s	2.68 s	4.08 s	7.46 s	38.5 in (0.98 m)	10 ft 4 in (3.15 m)	18 reps
All values from NFL Combine/Pro Day

=== Carolina Panthers ===
Shelton was selected in the second round (54th overall) of the 2005 NFL draft by the Carolina Panthers with a pick they obtained from the Seattle Seahawks. Shelton's NFL career got off to a rough start as he was placed on injured reserve at the beginning of the 2005 NFL season due to a broken foot. In the 2006 season, Shelton rushed for 23 yards on only eight carries, and was activated in only eight games. After a disappointing career with the Panthers he was released by them on September 1, 2007.

=== Washington Redskins ===
On January 9, 2008, the Washington Redskins signed Shelton to a future contract. He was waived/injured with a neck injury on July 30 and subsequently placed on injured reserve. He was released with an injury settlement on August 15.

== Personal life ==
Shelton and his wife Shamea had their wedding documented on episode six of the first season of My Big Fat Fabulous Wedding, a show on WE, Women's Entertainment Network. The final cost for the Lexington, KY wedding was $270,000, funded by Shelton's endorsement money.
