= Scotty Baesler =

American politician

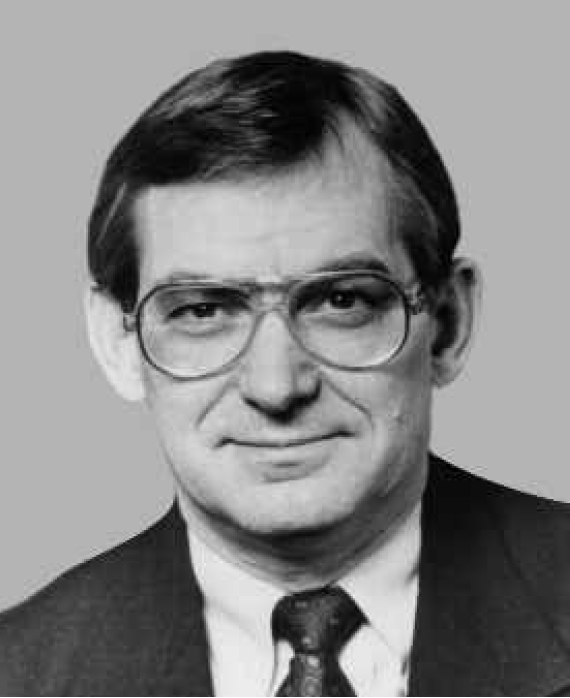

Member of the U.S. House of Representatives from Kentucky's 6th district
- In office January 3, 1993 – January 3, 1999
- Preceded by: Larry J. Hopkins
- Succeeded by: Ernie Fletcher

Mayor of Lexington
- In office January 4, 1982 – January 3, 1993
- Preceded by: James Amato
- Succeeded by: Pam Miller

Personal details
- Born: Henry Scott Baesler; July 9, 1941 (age 85) Lexington, Kentucky, U.S.
- Party: Democratic
- Spouse: Alice Baesler
- Children: 2
- Education: University of Kentucky (BS, JD)

Henry Scott Baesler (born July 9, 1941) is an American Democratic politician from the Commonwealth of Kentucky. He served as mayor of Lexington from 1982 to 1993, and in the United States House of Representatives from 1993 to 1999, representing the 6th district, including the cities of Lexington, Richmond, and Georgetown.

Baesler's core policies stemmed from government operations and politics, economics and public finance, education, agriculture and food and more. His most notable pieces of legislation include a proposed amendment of H.R. 3769 (105th): the Fairness for Working Families Act, H.R. 3867 (105th): the LEAF Act, and H.R. 4860: (105th): the National Domestic Violence Victim Notification Act.

== Life ==
Born in Lexington, Kentucky, Baesler graduated from the University of Kentucky in 1963 with a degree in accounting, later earning a J.D. degree in 1966. While at the university, Baesler played basketball under legendary coach Adolph Rupp; he was team captain in 1963. Over his final two seasons, Baesler had a per-game average of 10.3 points, 4 rebounds, 3 assists, while shooting 83% from the foul line.

Baesler practiced law following college while working on his family's tobacco farm. This became one of his policy focuses in his political career, being the only U.S. representative to have also been a tobacco farmer.

He married Alice Dudley Woods, a fellow University of Kentucky graduate, in 1963 with their marriage lasting 60 years until her death in 2023. Scotty and Alice had two children, Dudley Scott Baesler and Ashley Woods Baesler. Baesler identifies as an Independent Christian and moderate politician.

== Political career ==
After graduating from the University of Kentucky Law School in 1966, Baesler practiced law and served from 1967 to 1973 as an administrator for the Fayette County Legal Aid Administration, a nonprofit entity that provides free legal services to indigent persons facing criminal charges.

He served as vice mayor of Lexington from 1974 to 1978, then as a District Court judge in surrounding Fayette County from 1978 to 1982. Following his judgeship, Baesler was elected mayor of Lexington in 1981 and served for 11 years, becoming chairman of the Kentucky Economic Planning Commission.

In 1991, Baesler ran for governor in a four-way Democratic primary, landing 149,352 votes (30.4%). He finished second behind Brereton Jones (184,703 votes; 37.5%), who went on to win the general election by over 200,000 votes, defeating Republican Larry J. Hopkins, who was Baesler's congressman at the time.

In 1992 Hopkins declined to seek an eighth term in the U.S. House, and Baesler ran to succeed him, winning the general election with 60.7% against Republican Charles Ellinger. In Congress, Baesler was often associated with the Blue Dog Coalition, a caucus of Democrats who believed the party had moved too far to the left, becoming unappealing to the people. This coalition valued moderate Democratic ideas and emphasized fiscal responsibility.

During his time in the U.S. House, Baesler sponsored several key pieces of legislation including an amendment to the Violence Against Women Act of 1994, establishing a national domestic violence victim notification system, and H.R. 3867, the LEAF Act, which focused on providing financial aid and educational opportunities for working tobacco farmers affected by declining tobacco production.

He was a member of the House Agriculture Committee, where he served on the Nutrition and Foreign Agriculture and Risk Management and Specialty Crops subcommittees. Also, Baesler served on the House Veterans' Affairs Committee and its Hospitals and Health Care subcommittee. He served on the House Budget Committee from 1997 to 1999.

Baesler was re-elected to the House in 1994 with 58.8% of the vote over Republican Matthew Wills. In 1996, he defeated Ernie Fletcher in the general election by a vote of 125,999 to 100,231 (55.7%-44.3%). He declined to seek renomination to the House in 1998 to run for the U.S. Senate seat of retiring Democratic whip Wendell Ford. Baesler won a narrow primary victory of 4.9 percentage points over Louisville businessman Charlie Owen and Lieutenant Governor Steve Henry. He then lost by 0.6 points (6,766 votes) in the general election to Republican fellow congressman Jim Bunning.

In 2000, Baesler ran for his former U.S. House seat against Republican Ernie Fletcher, who had replaced him in 1998. Changing political preferences and the presence of a Reform Party candidate, Gatewood Galbraith, torpedoed Baesler's comeback attempt. He got just 34.8% of the vote against Fletcher's 52.8%, with Galbraith taking 12.0%.

== Voting record and legislation ==
Baesler was often labeled as a moderate on foreign, economic, and cultural issues. Many of his actions in Congress aimed to protect the tobacco industry and agriculture through his seat on the House Agriculture Committee, opposing Bill Clinton's taxes on tobacco and criticizing Surgeon General Joycelyn Elders' efforts to outlaw tobacco use and legalize marijuana. Baesler vocally advocated for the Bipartisan Campaign Integrity Act of 1997, a bill proposed to limit excessive soft-money campaign spending among interest groups and political parties. He also co-sponsored many pieces of legislation involving public health issues, taxation, and national security.

Political offices
Preceded by James Amato	Mayor of Lexington; 1982–1993	Succeeded by Pam Miller
U.S. House of Representatives
Preceded by Larry Hopkins	Member of the U.S. House of Representatives from Kentucky's 6th congressional district 1993–1999	Succeeded by Ernie Fletcher
Party political offices
Preceded by Wendell Ford	Democratic nominee for U.S. Senator from Kentucky (Class 3); 1998	Succeeded by Dan Mongiardo
U.S. order of precedence (ceremonial)
Preceded by Ronald Machtley as Former U.S. Representative	Order of precedence of the United States as Former U.S. Representative	Succeeded by Ken Lucas as Former U.S. Representative
