= 2022 Lexington, Kentucky mayoral election =

- November 8, 2022
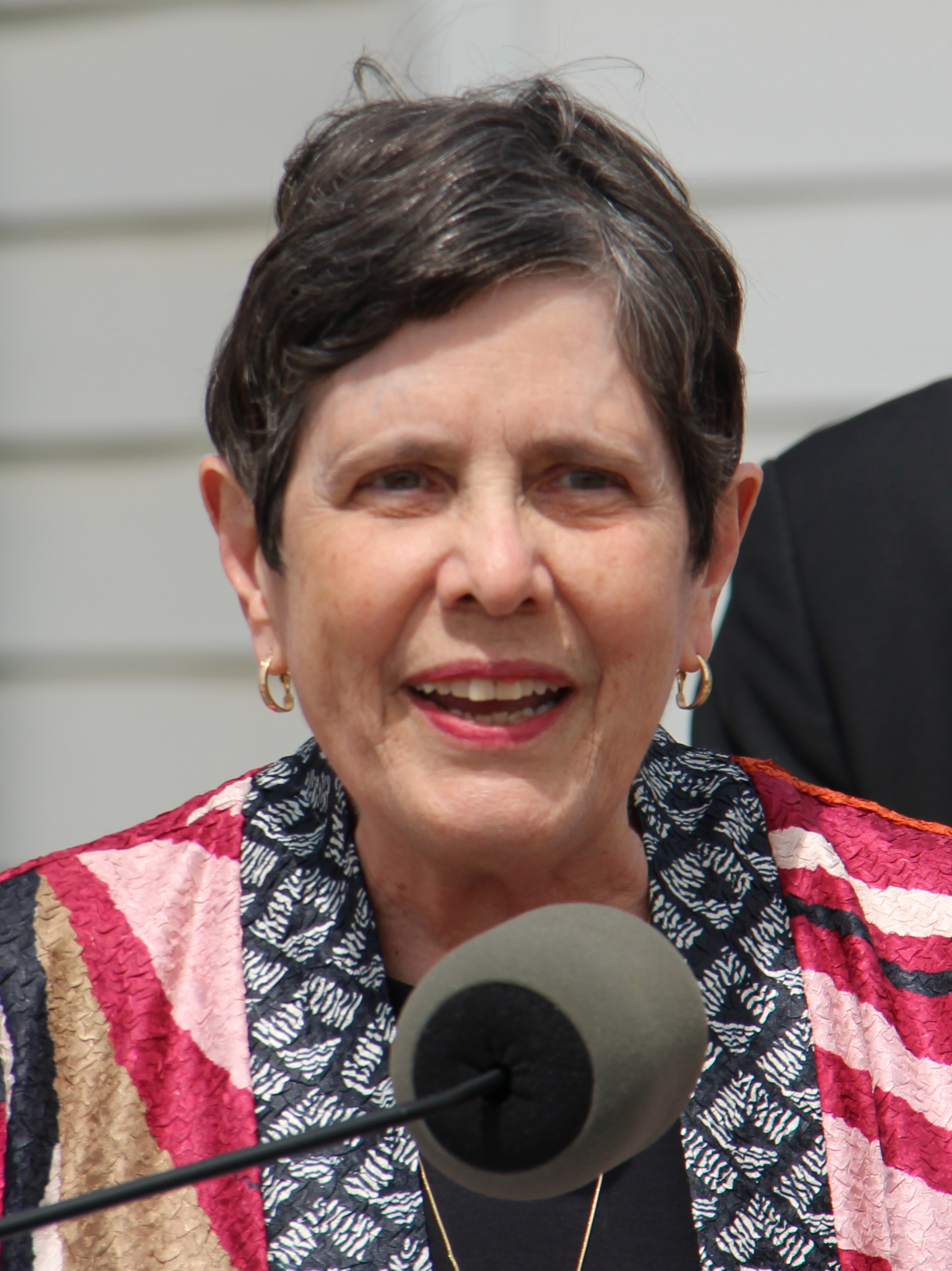

Candidate	Linda Gorton	David Kloiber
Popular vote	67,083	27,360
Percentage	71.03%	28.97%
- General election results by precinct Gorton: 50–60% 60–70% 70–80% 80–90% Tie
Mayor before election
Linda Gorton
Republican
Elected mayor
Linda Gorton
Republican

Lexington, Kentucky held nonpartisan elections for mayor on May 17, 2022, and November 8, 2022. It saw the re-election of Republican Linda Gorton, who had been serving as mayor since January 6, 2019.

== Campaign ==
Prior to the election, candidates addressed issues of violent crime, cost of living, and housing affordability.

=== Funding ===
Linda Gorton's campaign was funded by a variety of industries. The largest contribution came from the equine industry, which is prominent in Kentucky as a whole and Lexington in particular.

David Kloiber's campaign was mostly self- and family-funded, with the vast majority coming in the form of loaning funds to the campaign.

== Results ==
The mayor of Lexington is elected every four years in a two-step process. The first round is a selection of candidates by a nonpartisan blanket primary, after which a general election is held, regardless of whether a candidate earns an absolute majority of the vote in the primary election.

=== Primary ===
The primary election was held on May 17, 2022.

Primary election results
Candidate	Votes	%
Linda Gorton (incumbent)	32,664	71.08%
David Kloiber	6,436	14.01%
Adrian Wallace	6,022	13.10%
William Weyman	830	1.81%
Total votes	45,952	

=== General election results ===
Linda Gorton won the general election held on November 8, 2022.

Election results
Candidate	Votes	%
Linda Gorton (incumbent)	67,083	71.03%
David Kloiber	27,360	28.97%
Total votes	94,443	
