= Jim Newberry =

American mayor (born 1956)

Mayor of Lexington
- In office January 1, 2007 – January 3, 2011
- Preceded by: Teresa Isaac
- Succeeded by: Jim Gray

Personal details
- Born: December 16, 1956 (age 69) Hiseville, Kentucky, U.S.
- Party: Democratic
- Children: 2
- Education: The University of Kentucky; University of Kentucky College of Law
- Profession: Lawyer

Jim Newberry (born December 16, 1956) is an American politician who served as the mayor of Lexington, Kentucky from 2007 to 2011. He defeated incumbent mayor Teresa Isaac by the largest vote margin in the history of Lexington-Fayette's merged "Urban County" government. This was also the first time in Lexington-Fayette history that a challenger had defeated a sitting mayor.

Once taking office as Mayor, Newberry pursued economic development, development of the city's urban core and a number of environmental initiatives.

Newberry was defeated after serving one term by businessman and Vice Mayor Jim Gray.

== Personal life, education, and early career ==
Jim Newberry grew up in Hiseville, Kentucky, the son of a state legislator and farmer father and a school teacher mother. Newberry spent his youth working on the family farm.

Newberry received his bachelor's degree with a major in political science from the University of Kentucky in 1978. During his time as an undergraduate, he served as president of the Student Body and was a member of Sigma Nu fraternity. He then went on to the University of Kentucky College of Law, earning his Juris Doctor degree in 1981. Upon graduation, Newberry briefly practiced law, and then served as Vice-President and General Manager of Airdrie Stud, a thoroughbred farm in Central Kentucky.

Newberry later served as an executive officer in the Office of Lieutenant Governor Brereton Jones. He was later appointed to serve as acting secretary of Kentucky's Natural Resources and Environmental Protection Cabinet. During his tenure at the cabinet, Newberry successfully mediated a contentious dispute over a pipeline near Lake Cumberland. In the 1990s, Newberry practiced law in his own practice, later joining Wyatt, Tarrant & Combs, a large Lexington firm, where he eventually became partner-in-charge.

Newberry now resides in Louisville, KY, and has two sons: Andrew and William.

== Political career ==
=== Running for Congress in 1998 ===
In 1998, Newberry ran unsuccessfully for the Democratic nomination for United States Representative from the 6th Congressional District of Kentucky. He placed fifth in a crowded field of 7 candidates, which included future judge Ernesto Scorsone (who won the nomination), future Mayor and Newberry's 2006 Mayoral Election opponent Teresa Isaac, and future Kentucky State Treasurer, Democratic Party Chair, and Gubernatorial candidate Jonathan Miller.

=== Mayoral election of 2006 ===
Jim Newberry successfully ran for Mayor of Lexington-Fayette County in 2006. Newberry ran a change-based campaign, profiting from a contentious political environment that was dissatisfied with the direction of the city. The paramount issue that year was the question of whether or not the city should condemn and take over the local water company, Kentucky American Water, which was to be decided by popular referendum. Newberry did not take a position in this issue, promising to support the decision of the voters. His opponent, Teresa Isaac, openly supported condemnation.

On Election Day in 2006, Lexington voters voted not to condemn the water company, defeating the referendum with 61% of the vote.

Newberry also defeated Isaac, garnering 62.6% of the vote. This was the first time a challenger had unseated a sitting Mayor seeking reelection in the history of Merged Government in Lexington-Fayette County. It was also the largest margin of victory in Lexington's history.

Candidate	Votes	Percentage
Jim Newberry	49,726	62.6%
Teresa Isaac	29,755	37.4%

== Mayor of Lexington-Fayette County ==
Newberry took office as Mayor on January 1, 2007. As Mayor, he focused on a wide range of initiatives, including projects meant to stimulate the economy, balance the budget, make government more efficient, and protect the environment.

In the area of job-creation, Newberry partnered the city with Commerce Lexington, the University of Kentucky, and Bluegrass Community and Technical College to form the Bluegrass Business Development Partnership, which has thus-far led to the creation of over 2,300 jobs.

He also pursued efforts to make government more transparent and accountable, implementing board training for board-appointees, expanding the Internal Audit Division, and expanding and redesigning the city's website to include access to public meetings, as well as a large number of government documents.

He attempted to make government more efficient by reducing the size of the city's work force by 200 full-time positions. He has also pursued efforts to cut taxes, slicing the Garbage Tax by 10% and reducing the number of business owners liable for the mandatory license fee. Additionally, when Newberry first took office, he had an auditing firm hired to assess the efficiency of Urban County Government operations. The audit identified over 400 ways in which Lexington's government could save taxpayer money, and Newberry's administration worked to utilize this advice.

Newberry also pursued many initiatives to make Lexington environmentally more friendly. When he first took office, his administration created the city's first executive department dedicated solely to environmental issues, the Department of Environmental Quality. At the time Newberry took office, the city had been sued by the Environmental Protection Agency for allowing its storm and sanitary sewers to pollute local water sources for decades. Newberry reached a settlement with the EPA, and set about updating the city's aging infrastructure. His administration also endeavored to make Lexington more bicycle-friendly, installing more bike lanes and trails than ever before. This effort was nationally recognized by Bicycling Magazine in 2010, which named Lexington one of "America's Top 50 Bike-Friendly Cities." Additionally, Newberry pushed the city to increase recycling. During his term, revenue from recycling more than doubled, and in 2010, Newberry announced the city's investment in a new, single-stream recycling system that would encourage Lexingtonians to recycle more waste, and triple the capacity of the city's recycling center.

=== Controversies ===
In March 2008, private developer The Webb Companies announced plans to build a high-rise mixed-used skyscraper (see: CentrePointe, Lexington), on the block occupied by several businesses. These included The Dame, a popular music venue with young Lexingtonians and students, and Mia's, a gay and lesbian bar. Newberry supported the demolition of the block and the building of the project from the beginning, causing many in the progressive and arts communities to associate him with the project and its subsequent difficulties. Newberry supported the project because it was purported to create over 900 jobs and infuse $250,000,000 into the Lexington community through Tax Increment Financing. After almost a decade from the previous buildings being demolished in the Summer of 2008, construction began on new buildings in November 2017.

2008 and 2009 saw a series of highly publicized investigations into inappropriate spending at agencies receiving taxpayer funding. At the end of 2008, the Lexington Herald Leader reported on profligate spending and abnormally large expense account by Blue Grass Airport Director Michael Gobb, expenses which had been approved by the Airport's Board of Directors. The story sparked an investigation by Kentucky Auditor Crit Luallen, the result of which led to criminal charges against airport employees. Charges sparking the investigation included $4,500 spent at a Texas strip club, charged to a company credit card. As Mayor, Newberry was responsible for appointing members of the Airport Board, and was criticized by Vice Mayor Jim Gray and some Council Members for an alleged lack of action in response to the scandal, as well as his continued support of Airport Board officials and confidence in their ability to clean up the worrisome practices there.

As a result of heightened scrutiny of city agencies following the scandal surrounding the Airport, city auditors investigated spending at the taxpayer-funded Public Library. Library CEO Kathleen Imhoff and other Library employees came under scrutiny for excessive and inappropriate spending on Library credit cards, charges which included tens of thousands of dollars in gifts to staff, over $80,000 in travel expenses, and over $10,000 in non-reimbursed meals.

Following these scandals, similar spending issues were uncovered at two outside agencies in which Lexington-Fayette County is a member. At both the Kentucky League of Cities and the Kentucky Association of Counties, spending came under scrutiny from the media as well as formal auditors.

== Reelection campaign: 2010 ==
In November 2009, Newberry officially announced the start of his reelection campaign. On November 2, 2010, Newberry was defeated by Vice Mayor Jim Gray in the mayoral election.

Political offices
Preceded by Teresa Isaac	Mayor of Lexington, Kentucky; 2007-2011	Succeeded by Jim Gray
