= List of mayors of Lexington, Kentucky =

Mayor of Lexington, Kentucky
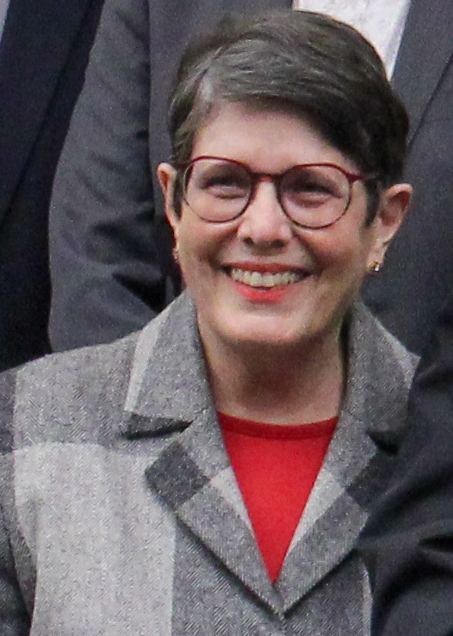
- Incumbent; Linda Gorton since January 6, 2019
- Formation: 1832
- First holder: Charlton Hunt
- Website: Office of the Mayor

This is a list of mayors of Lexington, Kentucky. The city and Fayette County governments were consolidated in 1974.

The current mayor is Linda Gorton, a registered Republican, elected in the nonpartisan 2018 mayoral election and reelected in the 2022 mayoral election.

== Pre-consolidation mayors ==
#	Mayor	Term start	Term end
1	Charlton Hunt	1832	1835
2	James E. Davis	1835	1837
3	James G. McKinney	1837	1839
4	Charles H. Wickliffe	1839	1841
5	Daniel Bradford	1841	1842
6	James Logue	1842	1846
7	Thomas Ross	1846	1847
8	John Henry	1847	1848
9	George Payne Jouett	1848	1849
10	Orlando F. Payne	1849	1851
11	Edward W. Dowden	1851	1854
12	Thomas H. Pindell	1854	1855
13	William Swift	1855	1859
14	Thomas B. Monroe Jr.	1859	1860
15	Benjamin F. Graves	1860	1862
16	Caleb Thomas Worley	1862	1863
17	Joseph Wingate	1863	1866
18	David W. Standiford	1866	1867
19	Jerry T. Frazier	1867	1868
20	Joseph G. Chinn	1868	1869
21	Jerry T. Frazier	1869	1880
22	Claude M. Johnson	1880	1888
23	Charles W. Foushee	1888	1892
24	J. Hull Davidson	1892	1893
25	Henry T. Duncan	1893	1896
26	Joseph Bullock Simrall	1896	1900
27	Henry T. Duncan	1900	1904
28	Thomas A. Combs	1904	1907
29	R. B. Waddy	1907	1908
30	John Skain	1908	1912
31	J. Ernest Cassidy	1912	1916
32	James C. Rogers	1916	1919
33	William H. McCorkle	1919	1920
34	Thomas Clark Bradley	1920	1924
35	Hogan Yancey	1924	1928
36	James J. O'Brien	1928	1932
37	William Thomas Congleton	1932	1934
38	Charles R. Thompson	1934	1936
39	E. Reed Wilson	1936	1940
40	T. Ward Havely	1940	1943
41	R. Mack Oldham	1943	1948
42	Thomas G. Mooney	1948	1952
43	Fred Fugazzi	1952	1956
44	Shelby C. Kinkead	1956	1960
45	Richard J. Colbert	1960	1964
46	Fred Fugazzi	1964	1968
47	Charles Wylie	1968	1972
48	H. Foster Pettit	1972	1974

== Post-consolidation mayors ==
#	Mayor	Term start	Term end
1	H. Foster Pettit	1974	1978
2	James G. Amato	1978	1982
3	Scotty Baesler	1982	1993
4	Pam Miller	1993	2003
5	Teresa Isaac	2003	2007
6	Jim Newberry	2007	2011
7	Jim Gray	2011	2019
8	Linda Gorton	2019	

== Sources ==
- Peter, Robert (1979). History of Fayette County, Kentucky. Southern Historical Press. ISBN 9780893081638.
- Wright, John Dean (1982). Lexington: Heart of the Bluegrass. Lexington-Fayette County Historic Commission. ISBN 9780912839066.
- Shawn Gillen (2010). "'The urge to merge:' the consolidation of Lexington and Fayette County, Kentucky". In Suzanne M. Leland; Kurt Thurmaier (eds.). City-County Consolidation: Promises Made, Promises Kept?. Georgetown University Press. ISBN 978-1-58901-622-4.
