= 2018 Lexington, Kentucky mayoral election =

- November 6, 2018
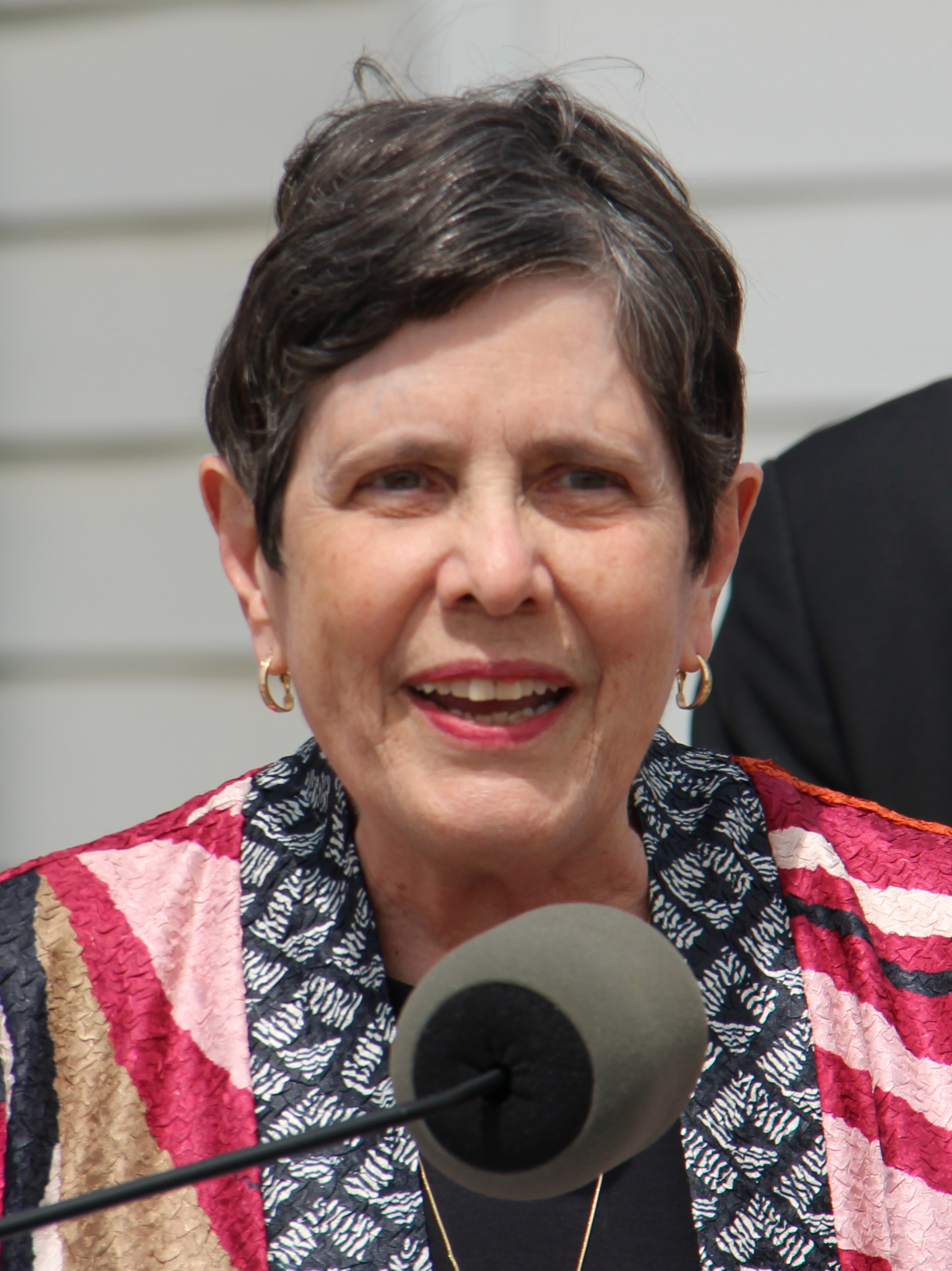

Candidate	Linda Gorton	Ronnie Bastin
Popular vote	67,480	40,365
Percentage	62.56%	37.42%
Mayor before election
Jim Gray
Democratic
Elected mayor
Linda Gorton
Republican

Lexington, Kentucky held an election for mayor on November 6, 2018, with the primary election held on May 22. It saw the election of Republican Linda Gorton.

== Results ==
=== Primary ===
Primary results
Candidate	Votes	%
Linda Gorton	23,200	41.72%
Ronnie Bastin	14,207	25.55%
Teresa A. Isaac	8,845	15.91%
Kevin O. Stinnett	7,866	14.15%
Ike Lawrence	847	1.52%
William Weyman	326	0.59%
Skip Horine	315	0.57%
Total votes	55,606	

=== General election ===
General election results
Candidate	Votes	%
Linda Gorton	67,480	62.56%
Ronnie Bastin	40,365	37.42%
Bryan Garten (write-in)	9	0.01%
Caroll Montague Price Jr. (write-in)	8	0.01%
Will McGinnis (write-in)	4	0.00%
Total votes	107,866	
