= Lexington-Fayette Urban County Council =

Type
- Type: Unicameral
- Term limits: 12 years (consecutive)

Leadership
- Mayor: Linda Gorton since January 7, 2019
- Vice-Mayor: Dan Wu since January 2, 2023

Structure
- Seats: 15
- Length of term: 2 years (district seats); 4 years (at-large seats)

Elections
- Voting system: First-past-the-post with a Nonpartisan blanket primary
- Last election: November 5, 2024 (12 seats)
- Next election: November 3, 2026 (15 seats)

Website
- https://www.lexingtonky.gov/government/office-urban-county-council

The Lexington-Fayette Urban County Council is the governing body of the city of Lexington, Kentucky, which is coterminous with Fayette County. It consists of 12 members elected from districts to two-year terms, and three members elected from the city at-large to four-year terms. All elections are nonpartisan.

The mayor of the city, currently Linda Gorton, presides over the council but has only a tie-breaking vote. The title of vice-mayor is given to the at-large member who received the most votes in the previous election.

== Membership ==
The following are members of the county council after the 2024 elections.

District	Member	First elected
Vice-Mayor	Dan Wu	2022
At-large	James Brown	2022 (Note: Brown previously represented the 1st district from 2015 to 2022.)
At-large	Chuck Ellinger II	2018 (Note: Ellinger previously represented the at-large district from 2003 to 2014.)
1	Tyler Morton	2024
2	Shayla Lynch	2022
3	Tom Eblen	— (Note: Appointed by mayor Linda Gorton in 2026.)
4	Emma Curtis	2024
5	Liz Sheehan	2020
6	Lisa Higgins-Hord	— (Note: Appointed by mayor Linda Gorton in 2025; previously represented the 6th district in 2020.)
7	Joseph Hale	2024
8	Amy Beasley	2024
9	Whitney Elliott Baxter	2020
10	Dave Sevigny	2022
11	Jennifer Reynolds	2018
12	Hil Boone	2024
