= 1991 United States gubernatorial elections =

- October 19, November 5 and 16, 1991

4 governorships 3 states; 1 territory
	Majority party	Minority party
Party	Democratic	Republican
Seats before	28 (Note: Howard Dean (D) succeeded Vermont Governor Richard A. Snelling (R) who died in office in August 1991.)	20 (Note: Louisiana Governor Buddy Roemer was elected as a Democrat in 1987, but switched to the Republican Party in March 1991.)
Seats after	28	20
Seat change	Steady	Steady
Popular vote	1,935,958	1,326,961
Percentage	59.13%	40.53%
Seats up	2	1
Seats won	2	1
- Democratic gain Democratic hold Republican gain

United States gubernatorial elections were held on November 5, 1991, in three states and one territory. Prior to the elections, Democrats held two seats and Republicans held one. The national balance of power did not change as a result of the elections, but the balance of power shifted in two states.

In Kentucky, the incumbent governor, Wallace Wilkinson, was term-limited. Lieutenant Governor Brereton C. Jones was the candidate for the Democrats and defeated Republican Representative Larry J. Hopkins.

== Election results ==
State	Incumbent	Party	First elected	Result	Candidates
Kentucky	Wallace Wilkinson	Democratic	1987	Incumbent term-limited. New governor elected. Democratic hold.	✓ Brereton C. Jones (Democratic) 64.7%; Larry J. Hopkins (Republican) 35.3%
Louisiana	Buddy Roemer	Republican	1987	Incumbent eliminated in primary. New governor elected. Democratic gain.	✓ Edwin Edwards (Democratic) 61.2%; David Duke (Republican) 38.8%
Mississippi	Ray Mabus	Democratic	1987	Incumbent lost re-election. New governor elected. Republican gain.	✓ Kirk Fordice (Republican) 50.8%; Ray Mabus (Democratic) 47.6%; Shawn O'Hara (Independent) 1.6%

== Closest races ==
States where the margin of victory was under 5%:

1. Mississippi, 3.2%

== Kentucky ==
1991 Kentucky gubernatorial election
- November 5, 1991
- Turnout: 44.1% ▲4.3 pp
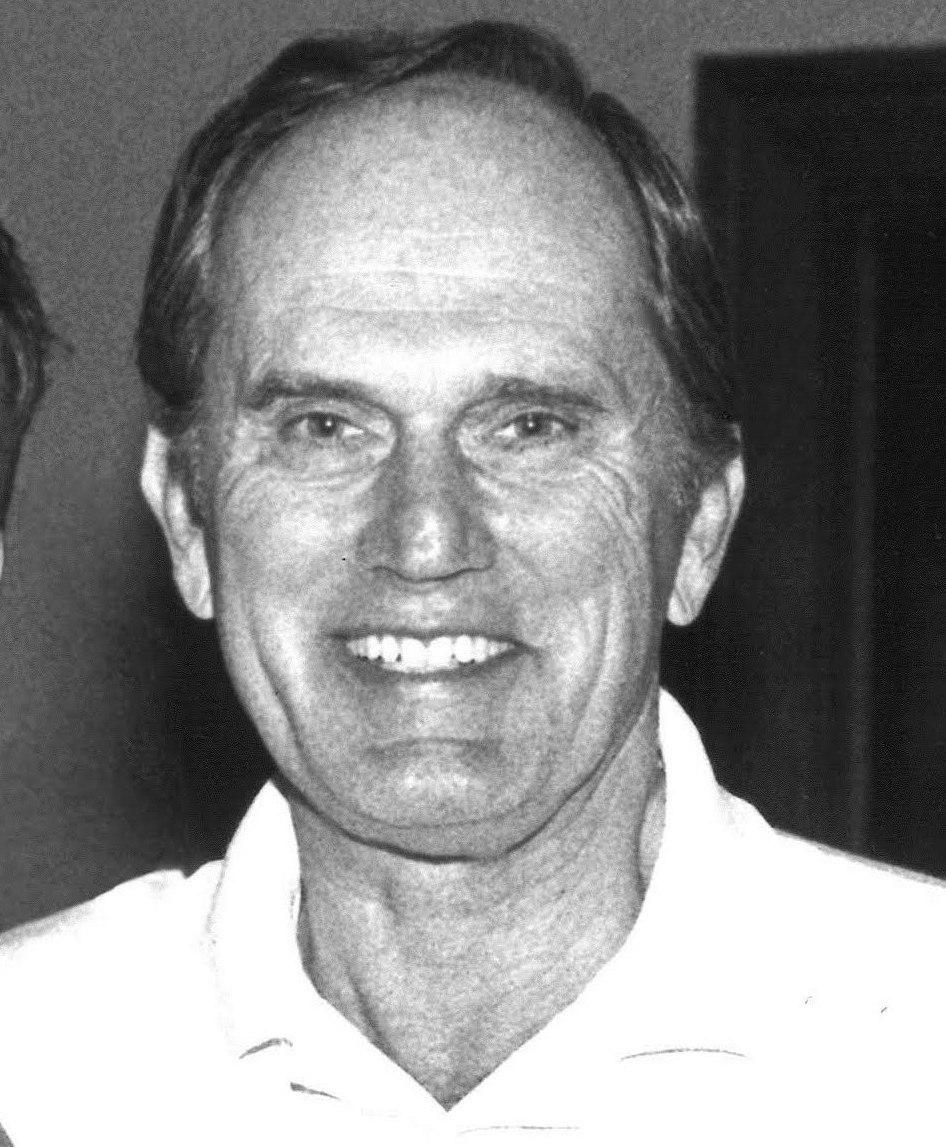

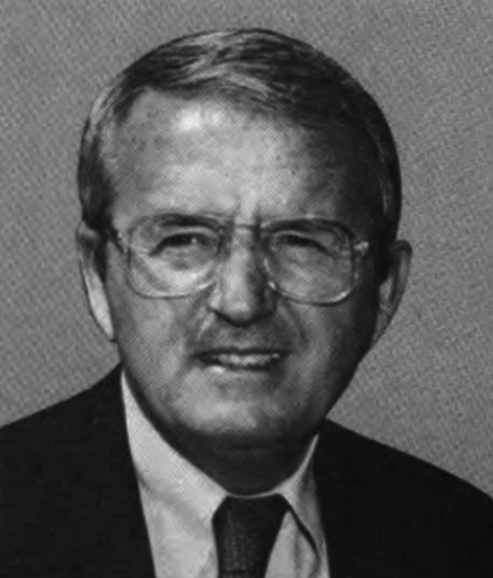
Nominee	Brereton Jones	Larry J. Hopkins
Party	Democratic	Republican
Popular vote	540,468	294,452
Percentage	64.73%	35.27%
- Jones: 50–60% 60–70% 70–80% 80–90% Hopkins: 50–60% 60–70%
Governor before election
Wallace Wilkinson
Democratic
Elected Governor
Brereton Jones
Democratic

The 1991 Kentucky gubernatorial election took place on November 5, 1991. Incumbent Governor Wallace Wilkinson was not eligible to seek a second term due to term limits established by the Kentucky Constitution, creating an open seat. At the time, Kentucky was one of two states, along with Virginia, which prohibited its governors from serving immediate successive terms. The Democratic nominee, Lieutenant Governor Brereton Jones, defeated Republican nominee and U.S. Congressman Larry J. Hopkins to win a term as governor.

== Louisiana ==
1991 Louisiana gubernatorial election
- October 19, 1991 (first round); November 16, 1991 (runoff)
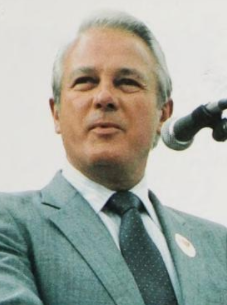

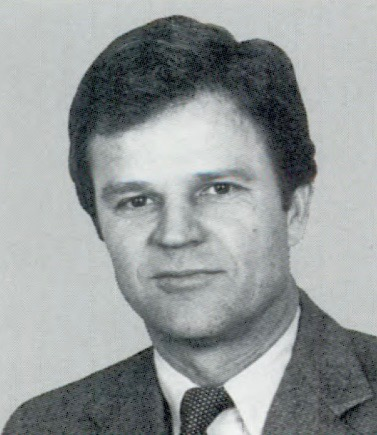

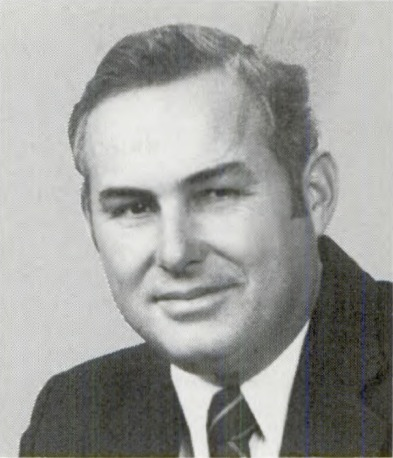
Candidate	Edwin Edwards	David Duke
Party	Democratic	Republican
First round	523,096; 33.76%	491,342; 31.71%
Runoff	1,057,031; 61.17%	671,009; 38.83%
Candidate	Buddy Roemer	Clyde C. Holloway
Party	Republican	Republican
First round	410,690; 26.51%	82,683; 5.34%
Runoff	Eliminated	Eliminated
- Edwards: 30–40% 40–50% 50–60% 60–70% 80–90% Duke: 30–40% 40–50% 50–60% 60–70% Roemer: 30–40% 40–50%
Governor before election
Buddy Roemer
Republican
Elected Governor
Edwin Edwards
Democratic

The 1991 Louisiana gubernatorial election resulted in the election of Democrat Edwin Edwards to his fourth non-consecutive term as governor of Louisiana. The election received national and international attention due to the unexpectedly strong showing of David Duke, a former Grand Wizard of the Knights of the Ku Klux Klan, who had ties to other white supremacist and neo-Nazi groups. Incumbent Republican Governor Buddy Roemer, who had switched from the Democratic to Republican Party during his term, ran for re-election to a second term but was eliminated in the first round of voting.

== Mississippi ==
1991 Mississippi gubernatorial election
- November 5, 1991
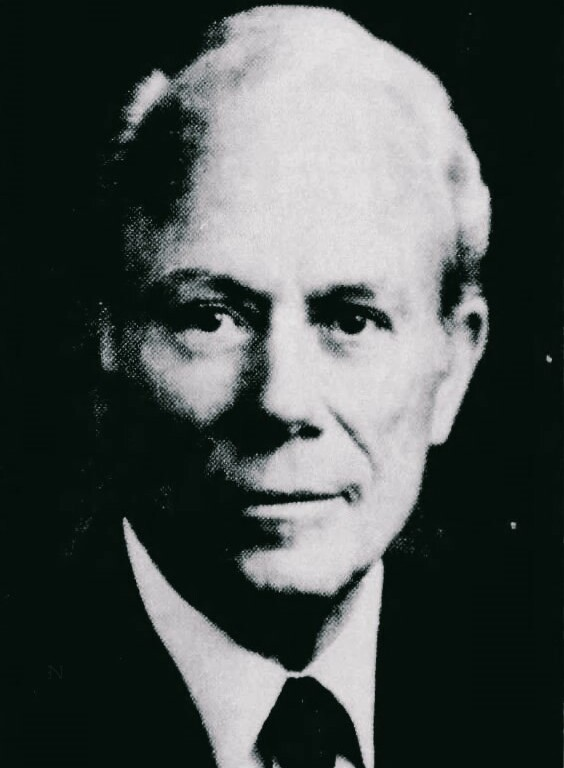

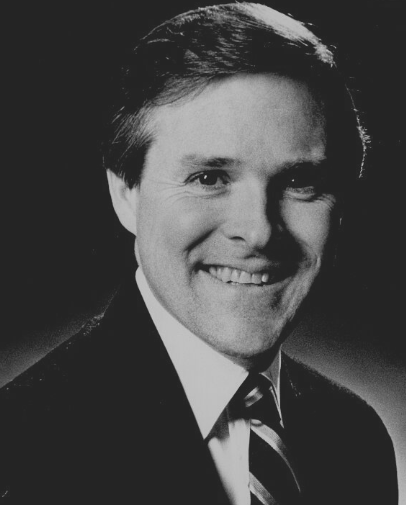
Nominee	Kirk Fordice	Ray Mabus
Party	Republican	Democratic
Popular vote	361,500	338,459
Percentage	50.83%	47.59%
- County results Fordice: 40-50% 50-60% 60-70% 70-80% Mabus: 50-60% 60-70% 70-80%
Governor before election
Ray Mabus
Democratic
Elected Governor
Kirk Fordice
Republican

The 1991 Mississippi gubernatorial election took place on November 5, 1991 to elect the Governor of Mississippi. Incumbent Democrat Ray Mabus unsuccessfully ran for reelection to a second term. This election marked the first time a Republican was elected Governor of Mississippi since Reconstruction, when Adelbert Ames won the office in 1873.
