= Richard Miller =

Richard Miller may refer to:

== Artists and academics ==
- Richard C. Miller (Richard Crump Miller, 1912–2010), American photographer
- Richard E. Miller (1875–1943), American Impressionist painter
- Richard J. Miller (1923–2008), sculptor, printmaker and painter
- Richard Louis Miller (born 1939), American clinical psychologist
- Richard N. Miller (fl. 1998), American doctor
- Richard W. Miller (1945–2023), American philosopher
- Richard Miller (engineer) (Richard Keith Miller, fl. from 1976), American engineer
- Richard Miller (psychologist) (Richard C. Miller, born 1948), American psychologist and Yogic scholar
- Richard Miller (singer) (1926–2009), American operatic tenor, professor of singing at Oberlin College and author
- Richard Miller (visual effects) (1942–2022), American sculptor and visual effects artist
- Rick Miller (comedian) (born 1978), Canadian director, actor, comedian, musician, playwright

== Politicians ==
- Richard Miller (Oregon politician), member of the Oregon Territorial Legislature, 1850
- Richard L. Miller (Richard Landis Miller, 1907–1983), member of the West Virginia House of Delegates
- Richard P. Miller Jr. (died 2014), mayor of Oneonta, New York and President of Hartwick College
- V. Richard Miller (1939–2016), American politician
- Rick Miller (Canadian politician) (Richard Arthur Miller, 1960–2013), Alberta politician
- Rick Miller (Texas politician) (born 1945), retired United States Navy officer and Republican politician

== Sports figures ==
- Rich Miller (baseball) (born 1951), American minor league baseball player and manager
- Rick Miller (baseball) (born 1948), American Major League Baseball player
- Rick Miller (speedway rider) (born 1961), former American international motorcycle speedway rider

== Other people ==
- Richard Miller (agent) (1937–2013), American FBI agent arrested for spying in 1984
- Richard Miller, engineer and businessman who founded VM Labs
- Rich Miller, Illinois political journalist, columnist and founder of Capitol Fax

== Fictional characters ==
- Richard "Dick" Miller, a character in the 1935 film Ah, Wilderness!
- Richard Miller, a recurring character in the Sniper film series
- Richard Miller, the main character in the games Time Crisis (1995) and Time Crisis: Project Titan (2001)

== See also ==
- Dick Miller (disambiguation)
