= E. Bartow Jones =

American politician

Member of the West Virginia Senate from the 4th district
- In office December 1, 1948 – December 1, 1956
- Preceded by: Harlan Staats
- Succeeded by: Roy L. McCulty

Personal details
- Born: July 29, 1909 Point Pleasant, West Virginia, U.S.
- Died: November 20, 1992 (aged 83) Mason County, U.S.
- Party: Republican
- Spouse: Nedra Eleanor Wilhelm (m. 1933)
- Children: 6, including Brereton C. Jones
- Education: University of Kentucky
- Occupation: Farmer; businessman

Edward Bartow Jones II (July 29, 1909 – November 20, 1992) was an American politician. He served as a Republican member for the 4th district of the West Virginia Senate.

== Life and career ==
Jones was born in Point Pleasant, West Virginia. He attended Greenbrier Military Academy and the University of Kentucky.

Jones served in the West Virginia Senate from 1949 to 1956, representing the 4th district.

Jones died in November 1992 in Mason County, at the age of 83.

Party political offices
Preceded by Howard Mason Gore	Republican nominee for Agriculture Commissioner of West Virginia; 1944	Succeeded by William B. "Bod" Rhodes
West Virginia Senate
Preceded by Harlan Staats	Member of the West Virginia Senate from the 4th district 1948–1956; With: Orton R. Karickhoff (1948–1950); E. Ray Reed (1950–1954); Brad Sayre (1954–1956)	Succeeded by Roy L. McCulty
