= 1991 Kentucky gubernatorial election =

- November 5, 1991
- Turnout: 46.2% (▲4.1%)
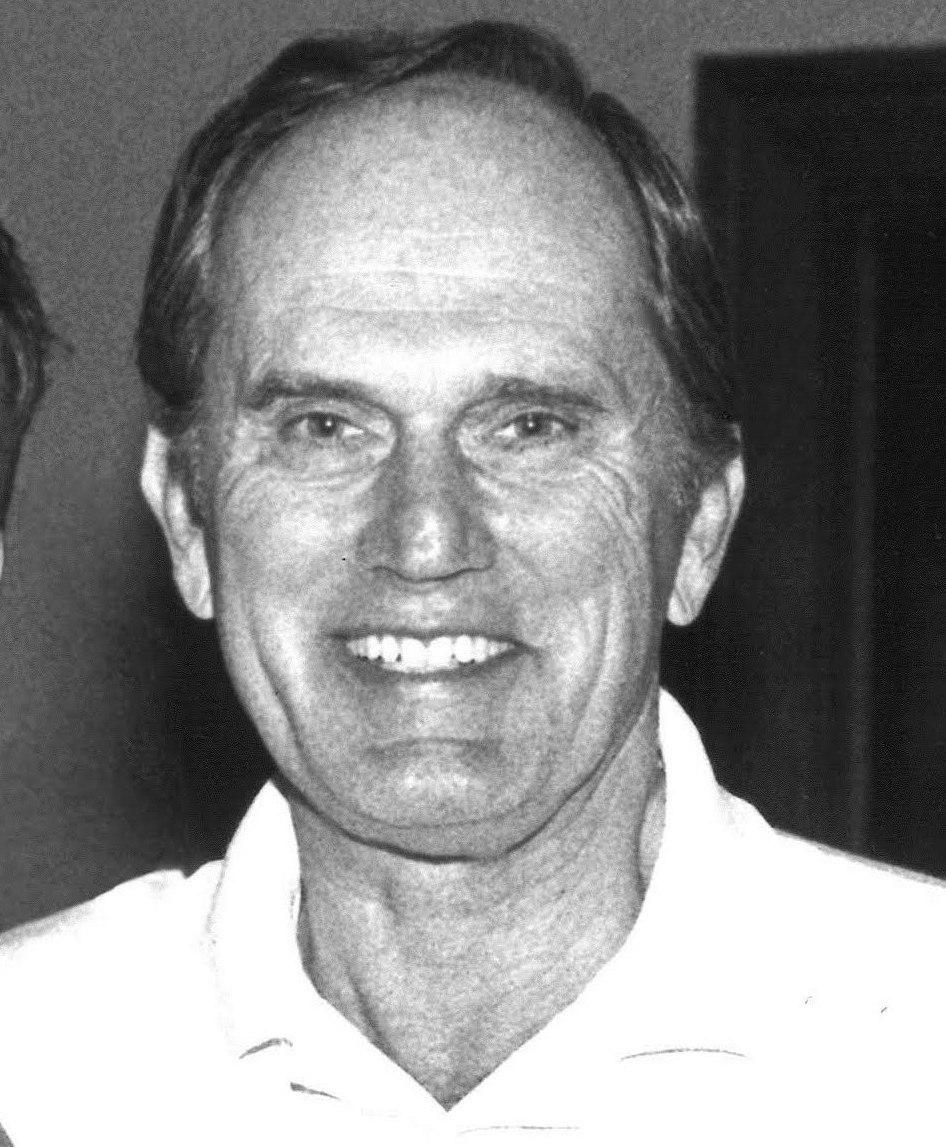

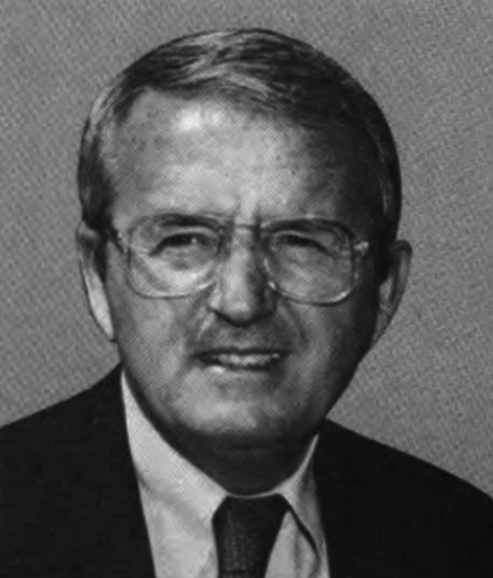
Nominee	Brereton Jones	Larry J. Hopkins
Party	Democratic	Republican
Popular vote	540,468	294,452
Percentage	64.73%	35.27%
- Jones: 50–60% 60–70% 70–80% 80–90% Hopkins: 50–60% 60–70%
Governor before election
Wallace Wilkinson
Democratic
Elected Governor
Brereton Jones
Democratic

The 1991 Kentucky gubernatorial election took place on November 5, 1991. Incumbent Governor Wallace Wilkinson was not eligible to seek a second term due to term limits established by the Kentucky Constitution, creating an open seat. At the time, Kentucky was one of two states, along with Virginia, which prohibited its governors from serving immediate successive terms. The Democratic nominee, Lieutenant Governor Brereton Jones, defeated Republican nominee and U.S. Congressman Larry J. Hopkins to win a term as governor.

== Democratic primary ==
=== Candidates ===
- Brereton Jones, Lieutenant Governor of Kentucky
- Scotty Baesler, Mayor of Lexington
- Floyd G. Poore, physician
- Gatewood Galbraith, perennial candidate

==== Withdrew ====
- Martha Wilkinson, First Lady of Kentucky & wife of Governor Wallace Wilkinson (endorsed Baesler)

=== Results ===
Democratic primary results
Party	Candidate	Votes	%
Democratic	Brereton C. Jones	184,703	37.55
Democratic	Scotty Baesler	149,352	30.36
Democratic	Floyd G. Poore	132,060	26.84
Democratic	Gatewood Galbraith	25,834	5.25
Total votes		491,949	100.00

== Republican primary ==
=== Candidates ===
- Larry J. Hopkins, U.S. Representative
- Larry Forgy, counsel to Governor Louie B. Nunn

=== Results ===
Republican primary results
Party	Candidate	Votes	%
Republican	Larry J. Hopkins	81,526	50.60
Republican	Larry Forgy	79,581	49.40
Total votes		161,107	100.00

== General election ==
=== Results ===
1991 Kentucky gubernatorial election
Party	Candidate	Votes	%	±%
Democratic	Brereton C. Jones	540,468	64.73	+0.23
Republican	Larry J. Hopkins	294,452	35.27	+0.36
Total votes		834,920	100.0	N/A
Turnout		873,887	46.19	+4.11
Registered electors		1,891,962		
Democratic hold				
