= 1987 Kentucky lieutenant gubernatorial election =

- November 3, 1987
- Turnout: 42.0%
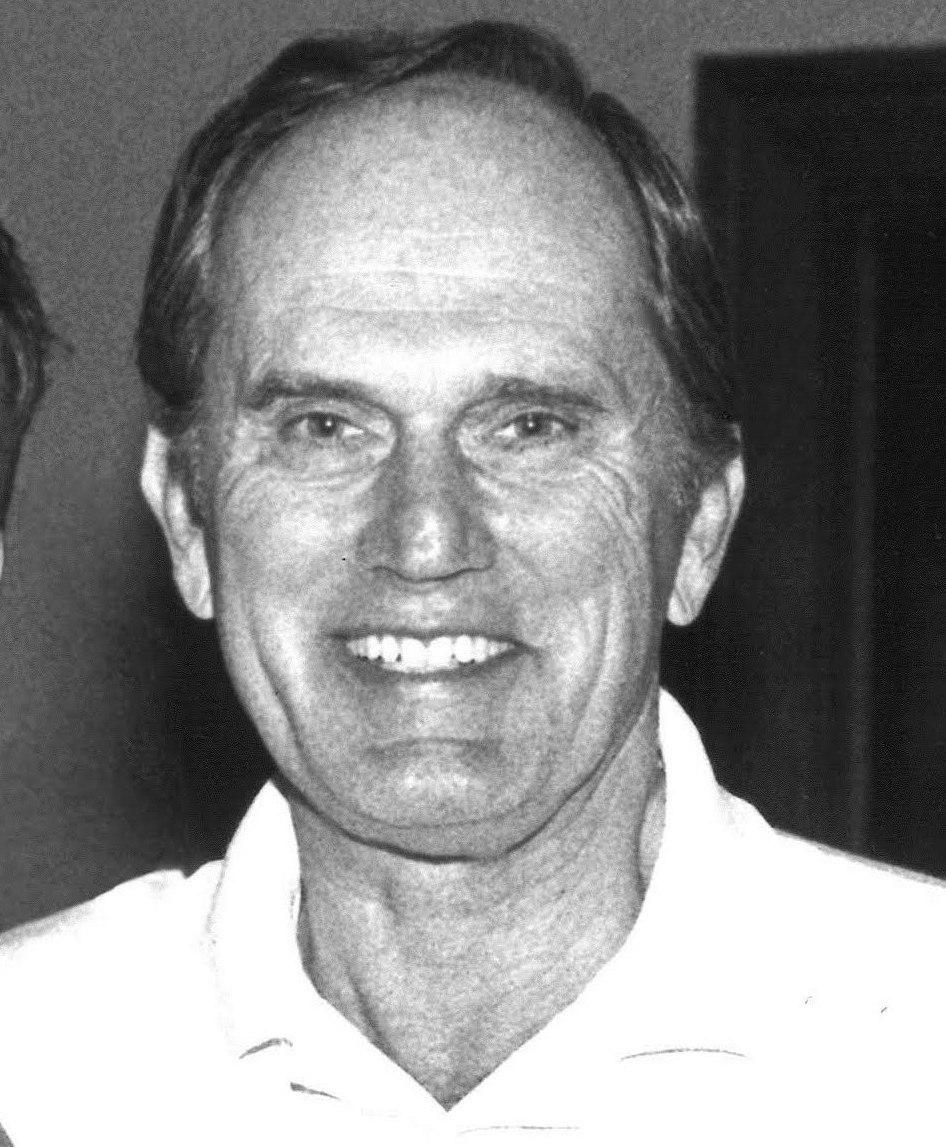

Nominee	Brereton Jones	Lawrence R. Webster
Party	Democratic	Republican
Popular vote	517,811	186,321
Percentage	73.51%	26.45%
- County results Jones: 50–60% 60–70% 70–80% 80–90% >90% Webster: 50–60%
Lieutenant Governor before election
Steve Beshear
Democratic
Elected Lieutenant Governor
Brereton C. Jones
Democratic

The 1987 Kentucky lieutenant gubernatorial election took place on November 3, 1987, to elect the lieutenant governor of Kentucky. Incumbent Democratic lieutenant governor Steve Beshear chose not to seek re-election to a second term, instead choosing to run for governor.

Woodford County millionaire horse breeder and farmer Brereton C. Jones managed to easily beat Republican nominee and Pikeville attorney Lawrence R. "Larry" Webster, 73% to 26%.

== Democratic primary ==
=== Candidates ===
==== Nominee ====
- Brereton C. Jones, Woodford county millionaire horse breeder and farmer.

==== Eliminated in primary ====
- Paul E. Patton, Pike County Judge-Executive.
- David L. Armstrong, incumbent Attorney General.
- David Boswell, incumbent Agriculture Commissioner.
- Alice McDonald, incumbent State Superintendent.
- Wilton Benge Cupp, candidate for governor in 1963.

=== Fundraising ===
Campaign finance reports as of July 1, 1987
Candidate	Raised	Spent	Cash on hand
Brereton C. Jones (D)	$2,231,882 (Note: $1,631,000 of this total was self-funded by Jones.)	$2,206,378	$25,504
Paul E. Patton (D)	$1,597,803 (Note: $766,556 of this total was self-funded by Patton.)	$1,586,051	$11,752
David Boswell (D)	$316,371	$308,089	$165
Alice McDonald (D)	$342,216	$341,517	$699

=== Results ===
May 26, 1987 Democratic primary
Party	Candidate	Votes	%
Democratic	Brereton C. Jones	189,058	33.15%
Democratic	David L. Armstrong	147,718	25.91%
Democratic	Paul E. Patton	130,713	22.93%
Democratic	David Boswell	57,209	10.03%
Democratic	Alice McDonald	41,520	7.29%
Democratic	Wilton Benge Cupp	3,987	0.69%
Total votes		570,205	100.00%
Registered electors		1,319,078	
Turnout		639,516	48.48%

== Republican primary ==
=== Candidates ===
==== Nominee ====
- Lawrence R. "Larry" Webster, Pikeville attorney.

==== Eliminated in primary ====
- Tommy Klein, perennial candidate.

=== Results ===
May 26, Republican primary
Party	Candidate	Votes	%
Republican	Lawrence R. Webster	39,372	56.89%
Republican	Tommy Klein	29,830	43.11%
Total votes		69,202	100.00%
Registered electors		550,978	
Turnout		118,546	21.51%

== General election ==
=== Candidates ===
- Democratic: Brereton C. Jones, Woodford County millionaire horse breeder and farmer.
- Republican: Lawrence R. "Larry" Webster, Pikeville attorney.

=== Results ===
1987 Kentucky lieutenant gubernatorial election
Party	Candidate	Votes	%
Democratic	Brereton C. Jones	517,811	73.51%
Republican	Lawrence R. Webster	186,321	26.45%
Write-in		314	0.04%
Total votes		704,446	100.00%
Registered electors		1,951,243	
Turnout		821,062	42.07%
Democratic hold			
