= Orton R. Karickhoff =

American politician (1905–1987)

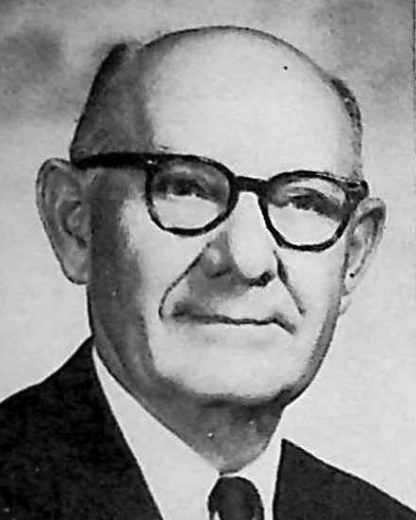

Member of the West Virginia House of Delegates from Roane County
- In office December 1, 1972 – December 1, 1974
- Preceded by: Orton A. Jones
- Succeeded by: Richard L. Miller

Member of the West Virginia Senate from the 4th district
- In office December 1, 1946 – December 1, 1950
- Preceded by: R. F. Musgrave
- Succeeded by: E. Ray Reed

Personal details
- Born: Orton Randolph Karickhoff; November 6, 1905 Hodgesville, West Virginia, US
- Died: August 21, 1987 (aged 81) Parkersburg, West Virginia, US
- Party: Republican
- Spouse: Greta Crislip (m. 1933)
- Education: West Virginia Wesleyan College (BS); Ohio State University (MA)

Orton Randolph Karickhoff (November 6, 1905 – August 21, 1987) was an American politician who served in both houses of the West Virginia Legislature. He won election to the House against Democrat Richard L. Miller in 1972, 22 years after his service in the state senate, but lost a rematch in the newly-drawn 9th district two years later.

West Virginia Senate
Preceded by R. F. Musgrave	Member of the West Virginia Senate from the 4th district 1946–1950; With: Harlan Staats (1946–1948); E. Bartow Jones (1948–1950)	Succeeded by E. Ray Reed
