= Vernon McCoy =

American politician

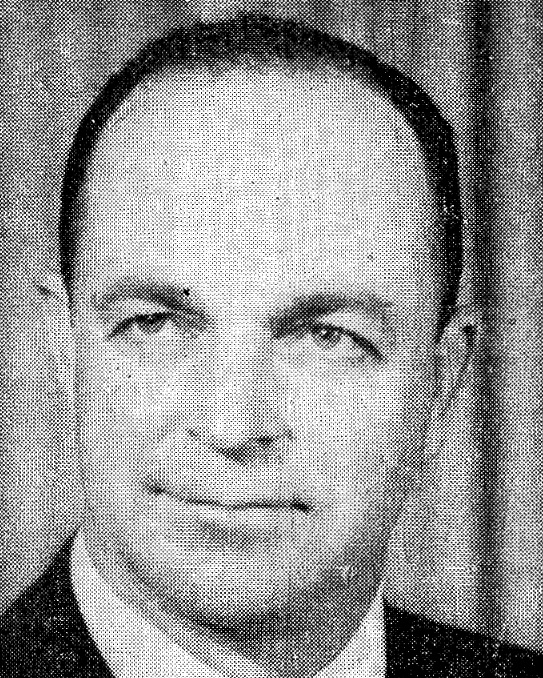

Member of the West Virginia Senate from the 4th district
- In office January 31, 1957 – December 1, 1958
- Appointed by: Cecil H. Underwood
- Preceded by: Brad Sayre
- Succeeded by: Paul R. Moore

Member of the West Virginia House of Delegates from Jackson County
- In office December 1, 1952 – December 1, 1956
- Preceded by: Delmer Hutton
- Succeeded by: Hoyt H. Taylor

Personal details
- Born: James Vernon McCoy; August 23, 1908 Ripley, West Virginia
- Died: November 4, 1988 (aged 80) Parkersburg, West Virginia
- Party: Republican
- Spouse: Mary Brown (m. 1937)

James Vernon McCoy (August 23, 1908 – November 4, 1988) was an American politician who served in both houses of the West Virginia Legislature. A Republican, Governor Cecil H. Underwood appointed him to the state senate after Brad Sayre's resignation in January 1957. He lost reelection to a full term to Paul R. Moore in 1958.
