= Brereton C. Jones =

American politician (1939–2023)

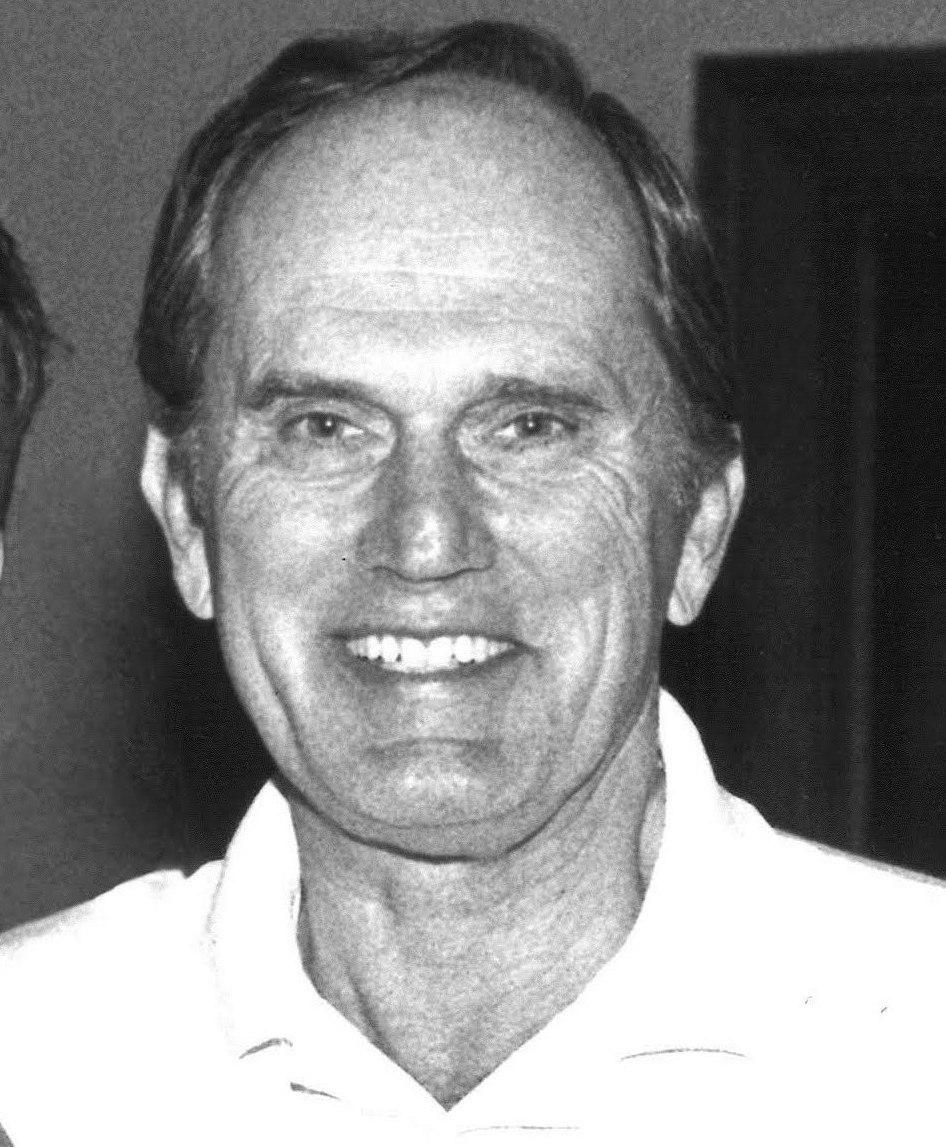
- Jones in 1998

58th Governor of Kentucky
- In office December 10, 1991 – December 12, 1995
- Lieutenant: Paul Patton
- Preceded by: Wallace Wilkinson
- Succeeded by: Paul Patton

50th Lieutenant Governor of Kentucky
- In office December 8, 1987 – December 10, 1991
- Governor: Wallace Wilkinson
- Preceded by: Steve Beshear
- Succeeded by: Paul Patton

Member of the West Virginia House of Delegates from Mason County
- In office December 1, 1964 – December 1, 1968
- Preceded by: Carroll W. Casto
- Succeeded by: Eugene Ball

Personal details
- Born: Brereton Chandler Jones; June 27, 1939 Gallipolis, Ohio, U.S.
- Died: September 18, 2023 (aged 84) Midway, Kentucky, U.S.
- Party: Democratic (after 1975)
- Other political affiliations: Republican (until 1975)
- Spouse: Libby Jones (m. 1970)
- Children: 2
- Parent: E. Bartow Jones (father)
- Education: University of Virginia
- Occupation: Horse breeder; politician
- Profession: Thoroughbred horse farm owner

Brereton Chandler Jones (June 27, 1939 – September 18, 2023) was an American politician from the Commonwealth of Kentucky. From 1991 to 1995, he was the state's 58th governor, and had served from 1987 to 1991 as the 50th lieutenant governor of Kentucky. After his governorship, he chaired the Kentucky Equine Education Project (KEEP), a lobbying organization for the Kentucky horse industry.

Born in Ohio and raised in West Virginia, Jones became the youngest-ever member of the West Virginia House of Delegates in 1964. Two years later, he was chosen as the Republican floor leader in the House. In 1968, he decided to leave politics and focus on his real estate business. He married Elizabeth "Libby" Lloyd in 1970 and in 1972 the family moved to historic Airdrie Farm, Libby's family estate in Woodford County, Kentucky. There, Jones founded Airdrie Stud, now an internationally recognized Thoroughbred farm. Although he remained mostly out of politics, Jones changed his party affiliation to Democratic in 1975, and was appointed to various boards and commissions by governors John Y. Brown Jr. and Martha Layne Collins.

In 1987, Jones announced his candidacy for lieutenant governor, admitting that he considered the office a stepping stone to some day becoming governor. He was elected, but experienced a poor relationship with Governor Wallace Wilkinson throughout their four-year terms. Jones was elected governor in 1991, turning back a challenge from Governor Wilkinson's wife Martha in the Democratic primary. Although Jones maintained a strained relationship with the Kentucky General Assembly following comments he made in the wake of the federal Operation Boptrot investigation, he was still able to pass much of his agenda, including an amendment that would allow state officials to succeed themselves in office once. However, he achieved only a partial victory on his top priority – healthcare reform. While the legislature acceded to many of Jones's proposals, such as eliminating the practice of denying insurance coverage to those with pre-existing conditions, they did not approve his mandate for universal health care for all Kentuckians.

Following his term in office, Jones founded the Kentucky Equine Education Project.

== Early life ==
Although his family lived in Point Pleasant, West Virginia, Brereton Jones was born on June 27, 1939, in Gallipolis, Ohio, the site of the nearest hospital to the family's home. One of six children born to E. Bartow Jones II, who served two terms in the West Virginia Senate, and Nedra Wilhelm Jones, he was raised on a dairy farm in Point Pleasant.

Jones was a star football player in the public schools of Point Pleasant (Point Pleasant High School, Class of 1957). After graduating from high school as valedictorian, he attended the University of Virginia on a football scholarship, playing both offensive and defensive end. He earned a Bachelor of Commerce in 1961. For one semester, he studied at the University of Virginia School of Law, but he returned home to West Virginia and established a real estate and construction business.

In 1964, Jones' political career began with his election as a Republican to the West Virginia House of Delegates. He was the youngest person ever elected to that body. In 1966, he was chosen as the Republican floor leader in the House. In 1968, Jones announced that he would not seek re-election to his seat, despite facing no opposition. Among the factors influencing his decision was his perception of corruption in state politics.

After his service in the West Virginia House, Jones began to concentrate on his real estate business and established a small horse farm just outside Huntington. His interest in the horse business led him to make several trips to Keeneland race track in central Kentucky; it was on one of these trips that he met his future wife, Elizabeth "Libby" Lloyd, daughter of Arthur Lloyd, the former Adjutant General of Kentucky. Jones and Lloyd married in 1970; they had two children – Lucy and Bret. In 1972, the Joneses moved to Airdrie Farm, Libby's childhood home in Woodford County, Kentucky. Jones leased a portion of the farm from his father-in-law and founded Airdrie Stud, a thoroughbred horse farm that has since been internationally recognized for its horses. Airdrie contains the original site of Woodburn Stud, a top thoroughbred farm in the 1800s. The property had not been used for breeding for 70 years prior to Jones' creation of Airdrie Stud. Jones went on to chair the Kentucky Thoroughbred Commission and serve as treasurer of the Breeders' Cup.

== Political career in Kentucky ==
In 1975, Jones registered as a Democrat, citing his disenchantment with the Nixon administration and his desire to participate in Kentucky primary elections. At the time, Democrats outnumbered Republicans in Kentucky by a 2-to-1 margin. Governor John Y. Brown Jr. named him to the board of directors for the University of Kentucky and the Chandler Medical Center. In the mid-1980s, Jones created the Kentucky Health Care Access Foundation to provide free health care to individuals who fell below the poverty line but did not qualify for Medicaid. Governor Martha Layne Collins chose Jones to chair her Medicaid Program Review Team and serve on her Council on Education Reform.

=== Lieutenant governor ===
In late 1985, Jones announced his candidacy for lieutenant governor in the 1987 election, conceding that he sought the office because he would like to serve as governor in the future. He convincingly won in the Democratic primary against Paul E. Patton, who later became governor, and David L. Armstrong, the sitting Attorney General and later Mayor of Louisville. Wallace G. Wilkinson, winner of the Democratic gubernatorial primary, praised Jones and said that, if elected, he would make Jones the head of a blue-ribbon economic development council. Wilkinson and Jones went on to win the general election; Jones defeated Republican nominee Lawrence R. Webster by a convincing vote of 517,811 to 186,321.

Soon after the election results were announced, Jones was quoted in a newspaper as saying that he had talked with Wilkinson about opening channels with the media, whom Wilkinson often refused to speak with. Jones also said that he did not agree with all of Wilkinson's political positions and would not be his "yes man". These comments angered Wilkinson, who backtracked on his promise to give Jones an active role in the administration. Relations between Jones and Wilkinson further deteriorated as both men tried to recoup the money spent during their campaigns.

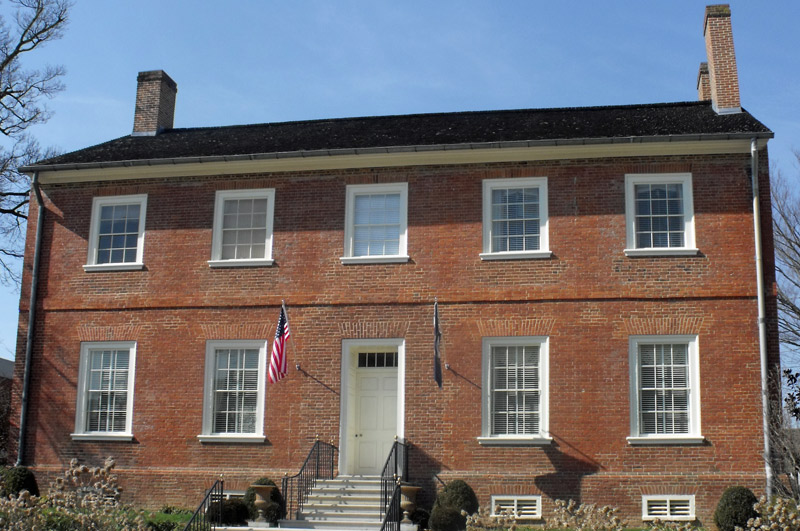
Jones chose not to live in the lieutenant governor's mansion

During the 1988 legislative session, Governor Wilkinson proposed an amendment to the Kentucky Constitution that would allow state officials, including the sitting incumbents, to succeed themselves in office once. As presiding officer in the Senate, Jones insisted that any such measure also include a runoff provision if a candidate did not receive a majority of votes in the party primary. Wilkinson opposed this provision, and the measure died in the state senate. Wilkinson's proposed education program also failed in the session, and Jones suggested that the governor should build a consensus among legislators before including the program on the agenda of a special legislative session, which Wilkinson had proposed for January 1989. After the 1988 session, Wilkinson called Jones a backstabber and accused him of sabotaging the succession amendment. The two did not meet for six months following the session.

As lieutenant governor, Jones advocated for the preservation of family farms and for school reform. He won praise for his efforts to include a "Made in Kentucky" label on produce grown in the state. Further, he claimed the state could save $500,000 a year by merging the offices of lieutenant governor, secretary of state, and state treasurer. Jones maintained that the arrangement would give the lieutenant governor something specific to do between legislative sessions and would provide a broader record upon which voters could judge the officeholder should they seek higher office. Jones' proposal, which would have required a constitutional amendment, was never adopted. Jones also claimed to have saved his office $200,000 by choosing not to live in the lieutenant governor's mansion, by reducing the number of Kentucky State Police troopers used for security at the mansion, and by giving up seven cars assigned to the office – two for him and wife Libby, and five used by the state troopers.

=== Governor ===
In 1991, Jones was the front-runner for the governorship for the entire gubernatorial campaign. The rivalry between Jones and Wilkinson had become so strong that Wilkinson's wife Martha was among Jones' challengers in the Democratic primary; she ended her candidacy 18 days before the primary. Advocating campaign finance reform, Jones garnered 184,703 votes in the primary, enough to best a field including Scotty Baesler (149,352 votes), Dr. Floyd Poore (132,060 votes), and Gatewood Galbraith (25,834).

In the general election, Jones faced Republican Larry Hopkins, a seven-term congressman representing Kentucky's 6th congressional district. Hopkins was considered the Republicans' best hope of capturing the governorship since Louie B. Nunn in 1967. Instead, Hopkins' negative campaign ads, mistakes about his record, and involvement in a House scandal involving bounced checks all hurt his chances. Jones won the election by a vote of 540,468 to 294,542, the largest margin of victory in a Kentucky gubernatorial race.

A supporter of "good government", Jones' first policy action as governor was to issue an executive order restricting the post-government employment of his appointees. He also secured passage of one of the nation's toughest ethics laws, limiting the activities of lobbyists and instituting campaign finance reform to diminish the advantage of wealthy candidates for office. The so-called "trustees bill", passed in 1992, provided for an independent review of all appointees to university boards of trustees. Jones later removed former governor Wilkinson from the board of the University of Kentucky using the bill's provisions. Despite these reforms, Jones drew criticism from ethics watchdogs because no law required him to disclose the identities of his business partners and associates with Airdrie Stud and because the farm benefited from a 1992 law that set up off-track betting parlors and allowed some of their proceeds to go to successful breeders.

The state faced a $400 million revenue shortfall when Jones took office. Shortly after his election, Jones created the Quality and Efficiency Commission to study ways to streamline state government. Among the enacted recommendations were refinancing state bonds at lower interest rates, cutting the state workforce by 2,000 employees (mostly through attrition), and spurring local economic growth through tax incentives. By the end of Jones' term, the state enjoyed a $300 million budget surplus.

During the first year of his administration, Jones and five others were traveling in a state helicopter from Frankfort to Fort Knox on August 7, 1992, when a tail rotor blade snapped, causing the helicopter to crash near Graefenburg in Shelby County. The pilot was able to guide the helicopter into a treetop to soften the impact. No one was killed, but Jones suffered a severe back strain and a bruised kidney. The National Transportation Safety Board later determined that the pilot and co-pilot had not properly attached an engine cowling that knocked off the tail rotor blade. Both pilots maintained that they did nothing wrong, and Jones credited them for the survival of the passengers aboard the helicopter.

Although fellow Democrats controlled two-thirds of the Kentucky General Assembly, Jones never developed a good working relationship with the legislature. This was due in part to remarks Jones made in the wake of the Operation Boptrot investigation that led to the conviction of 15 sitting or former state legislators. Jones called the investigation "a cleansing process"; legislators reacted negatively, claiming Jones was trying to take "the high ground" above them. Following Jones' remarks, state senate president John "Eck" Rose became Jones' bitter political foe. Nevertheless, Jones was able to enact many of his legislative priorities during his term.

Jones' top priority as governor was the passage of health care reform. He appointed two health care reform study commissions, and in May 1993, he called the legislature into a special session to consider a universal health care bill. The only measure to come out of this session was a temporary tax on health care providers. Legislators also agreed to work toward a bill that could be passed in the next regular legislative session. On March 2, 1994, the Kentucky House of Representatives passed a health care reform bill that did not include universal coverage. Angered, Jones began campaigning against the bill, but the Kentucky Senate passed its version on March 22.

Both chambers worked to reconcile differences between their respective versions of the bill, and on April 1, 1994, the last regular day of the legislative session, the Senate passed a compromise bill, but the House killed it on a procedural motion. On April 15, the last day of the session, which legislators had set aside to override any gubernatorial vetoes, the health care bill was reintroduced and passed both houses of the General Assembly. Jones then reversed course and signed it. Among the reforms included in the bill were a mechanism making the policies of all companies uniform and the creation of a Health Policy Board to regulate rate increases. It ensured that insurance companies could not deny coverage because of a pre-existing condition and allowed workers to retain their insurance after changing jobs.

Jones also advocated for an amendment to the state constitution that had major implications for the governor's office. Under the terms of the amendment, the lieutenant governor no longer became acting governor when the sitting governor left the state. It also allowed candidates for governor and lieutenant governor to run as a ticket instead of being elected on separate ballots. The centerpiece of the amendment, however, was the removal of the restriction on governors from succeeding themselves in office. The state constitution had previously barred the incumbent from seeking a second consecutive term; under the new amendment, the sitting governor would be allowed to succeed himself once. Succession amendments had been proposed and defeated during the administrations of John Y. Brown Jr. and Wallace Wilkinson, but Jones was able to see it passed because, unlike Brown and Wilkinson, he was willing to exempt the present incumbents, including himself, from the succession provision. Separate legislation passed during Jones' term required a runoff election if no gubernatorial candidate won a majority in his or her party primary. (Each of Jones' three immediate predecessors would have faced a runoff had this law been in effect during their primaries.)

Among Jones' other accomplishments were the passage of a mandatory seat belt law, an increase in funding for the state park system, and the phasing out of the state inheritance tax. He also established the state's largest-ever reserve trust fund using income from the state's sales, income, corporate, coal, severance, and property taxes. He exceeded his goal of having a 7.4 percent minority representation in the state workforce, and appointed three times more African-Americans than the previous administration had recruited. He also appointed more women to government positions than his predecessor, including Sara Combs, the first woman to serve on the Kentucky Supreme Court.

== Later life ==
At the end of his term as governor, Jones retired to Airdrie Stud. He started Commonwealth Broadcasting and joined with partners to purchase several radio and television stations in Kentucky and Tennessee. He remained a public advocate of campaign finance reform and health care reform and was a supporter of posting the Ten Commandments in public schools.

In 2004, he founded the Kentucky Equine Education Project (KEEP), an organization dedicated to educating the public about Kentucky's horse industry and lobbying the General Assembly for more horse-friendly legislation. He served as chair of KEEP from 2004 to 2011.

In October 2016, Jones was the recipient of the inaugural Industry Vision Award for "significant contributions to Kentucky's horse industry."

Jones died on September 18, 2023, from a long-illness at his Airdrie Stud Farm in Midway, Kentucky, at age 84. His casket was laid in state at the Kentucky State Capitol on September 25. His funeral was held two days later at Forks of Elkhorn Baptist Church in Midway and was followed by a private burial.

Political offices
Preceded by Wallace G. Wilkinson	Governor of Kentucky; 1991–1995	Succeeded by Paul E. Patton
Preceded by Steve Beshear	Lieutenant Governor of Kentucky; 1987–1991	Succeeded by Paul E. Patton
Party political offices
Preceded by Steve Beshear	Democratic nominee for Lieutenant Governor of Kentucky; 1987	Succeeded by Paul E. Patton
Preceded by Wallace G. Wilkinson	Democratic nominee for Governor of Kentucky; 1991	Succeeded by Paul E. Patton
