= Roy L. McCulty =

American politician

Member of the West Virginia Senate from the 4th district
- In office December 1, 1956 – December 1, 1960
- Preceded by: E. Bartow Jones
- Succeeded by: Jack Johnson

Member of the West Virginia House of Delegates from Roane County
- In office December 1, 1942 – December 1, 1954

Personal details
- Born: Roy Lee McCulty; September 6, 1889
- Died: September 9, 1968 (aged 79)
- Party: Republican
- Spouse: Elah Sinnett (m. 1936)

Military service
- Battles/wars: World War I

Roy Lee McCulty (September 6, 1889 – September 9, 1968) was an American World War I combat veteran, a Roane County, West Virginia businessman, a six term Republican member of the West Virginia House of Delegates from 1942 to 1954, and a Republican member of the West Virginia Senate, representing its 4th district from 1957 to 1960.
