= Kentucky Lottery =

American state lottery

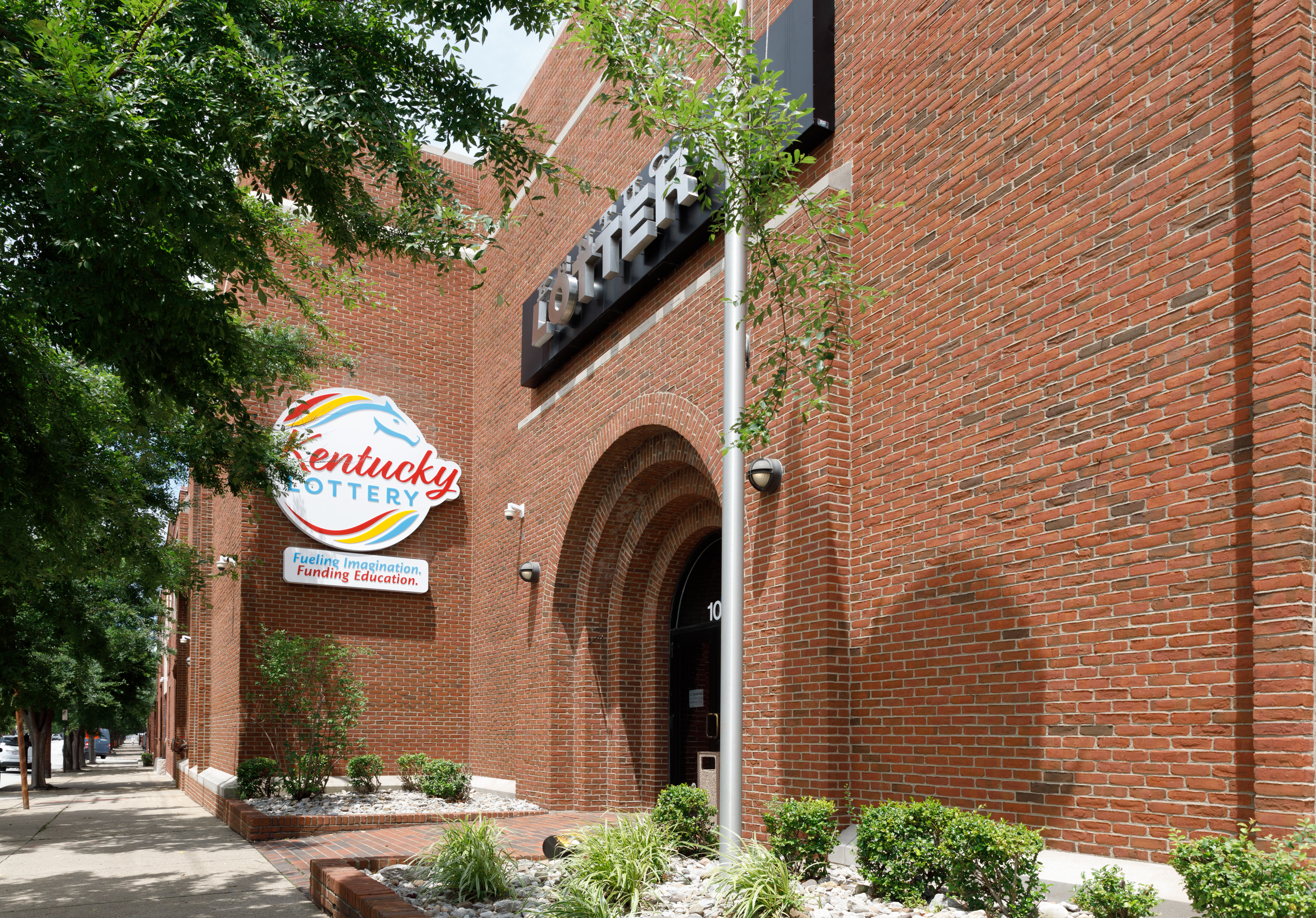
- Formation: April 4, 1989; 37 years ago
- Headquarters: Louisville, Kentucky, U.S.
- President & CEO: Mary Harville
- Website: www.kylottery.com

The Kentucky Lottery, began in April 1989 after a November 1988 vote in which over 60% of voters cast ballots in favor of it. On April 4, 1989, ticket sales began at over 5,000 licensed retailers with over $5 million in sales on the first day. Kentucky Lottery players had two Scratch-off games to choose from, including, Beginner's Luck ($1) and Kentucky Derby Dreamstakes ($2).

Kentucky Lottery proceeds fund college scholarship and grant programs across the Commonwealth, including every dime of the popular KEES program. More than $5.0 Billion in scholarships and grants have been awarded to Kentucky students.

== History ==
The first legally authorized "lottery" in Kentucky was held in 1792 in order to raise funds to build a church in Lexington.

A modern lottery was a highly debated topic in the gubernatorial race of 1987. Wallace G. Wilkinson, who went on to become governor, touted the introduction of a state lottery in a heavily funded campaign that ended up being one of the biggest gubernatorial victories in Kentucky history.

As the incumbent Lieutenant Governor, Steve Beshear opposed the lottery in the 1987 race. Ironically, 20 years later, Beshear became Governor-Elect after running on a platform in support of legalized gambling in Kentucky in the 2007 race against Ernie Fletcher.

== Current Draw Games ==
=== Kentucky-only draw games ===
==== Pick 3 ====
Pick 3 is drawn twice daily, every day of the week. There are various wagers and prizes. The top prize for Pick 3 is $600, based on a $1 straight wager.

==== Pick 4 ====
Pick 4 is also drawn twice daily, every day of the week. The top prize is $5,000, based on a $1 straight wager. There are also various wagers and prizes with Pick 4.

==== Cash Ball 225 ====
Cash Ball 225 is drawn daily. Cash Ball uses a 4+1 matrix (Mega Millions and Powerball each use a 5+1 matrix). Cash Ball draws four numbers from 1 through 35, followed by the Cash Ball (numbered 1 through 25). Cash Ball offers a top prize of $225,000 and each play is only $1. For an additional $1 per play, players can add EZ Match for a chance to win up to $500 instantly.

==== Kentucky 5(now a retired game) ====
Introduced on November 21, 2022. Players pick 5 numbers from 1 to 39, and plays cost $1. For an additional $1, players can multiply the non-jackpot prizes with the Xtra Multiplier feature, by 2, 3, 4, or even up to 5 times. When the Xtra option has been purchased, players will receive a computer-selected multiplier number of 2X, 3X, 4X or 5X assigned to each play wagered. Players also win by matching at least 3 or 4 numbers. Matching 2 numbers while the Xtra is active, the prize is fixed at $2. The starting jackpot prize is $40,000, and if there's no winner in a drawing, it keeps rolling. Drawings are held every night at 11 PM ET/10 PM CT. The Kentucky 5 commenced the ticket sales on November 20, 2022, and the first drawing was held one day later. The game ended on November 2, 2024.

==== 5 Card Cash (now a former game) ====
5 Card Cash is drawn daily and also has an instant win feature. Each 5 Card Cash play costs $2 and only one play will be printed on a ticket. Each ticket is a quick pick play with five card symbols, no card knowledge or skill is needed to play. Players can win instantly at the time of purchase if the card symbols on their ticket match a specified winning hand from the prize structure. The top prize for an instant win is $5,000. The top prize for the nightly drawing is $100,000. The game has ended as of the Saturday, March 26, 2022, drawing.

==== Keno ====
Keno offers a top prize of $100,000. Drawings take place every four minutes. Players choose how many numbers (spots) they want to play per draw. They can select up to 10 numbers from 1 through 80 or select Quick Pick and let the computer randomly select numbers for them. For an additional cost per play, they can add a Multiplier and/or Bulls-Eye for a chance to win bigger prizes. Total Ticket Cost = Base Keno Wager + Multiplier (if selected) + Bulls-Eye (if selected) x Number of Consecutive Draws.

==== CASH POP ====
CASH POP drawings are every day, every four minutes. Players choose how many CASH POP numbers to play per draw. They select 1 number or up to 15 numbers from 1 to 15, or select Quick Pick and let the computer randomly select number(s) for them. Players can select "Cover All" to play all 15 numbers for a guaranteed win. The Total Ticket Cost = Amount of CASH POP Numbers Selected x Wager Amount per Number x Number of Consecutive Draws.

=== Multi-jurisdictional games ===
==== Powerball ====
Powerball is drawn three nights a week - Mondays, Wednesdays and Saturdays at approximately 11 PM ET. Each play is $2. Players choose five white balls (1-69) and one Powerball (1-26) or they can select the Quick Pick option to let the computer randomly select their numbers. For an additional $1 per play, players can add Power Play to multiply their winnings (excluding the jackpot). Jackpot winners choose between 30 graduated annual payments or its cash option.

==== Mega Millions ====
Players choose five white ball (1-70) and one Mega Ball (1-24) or they can select the Quick Pick option to let the computer randomly select their numbers. Each play is $5 with megaplier included. Jackpot winners choose between 30 graduated annual payments or its cash option. Mega Millions is drawn on Tuesdays and Fridays at approximately 11 PM ET.

==== Lucky for Life ====
Lucky For Life is drawn every day of the week. Players choose five white balls (1–48) and one Lucky Ball (1–18) or allow the computer to randomly select their numbers by choosing the Quick Pick option. The top prize is $1,000-per-day-for-life; the second prize is $25,000-per-year-for-life. Winners of either "lifetime" prize can choose cash in lieu of the annuity payments.

== Scratch-offs ==
The Kentucky Lottery offers more than 40 Scratch-offs at any given time, ranging in price from $1 to $50. The Fastest Road to $3 Million, Break Fort Knox, and 300x (as of 2024) are $30 tickets offering a $3 million top prize, the largest top prize ever offered by the Kentucky Lottery. The first $30, 3 Million top prize scratch off was Fastest Road to 3 Million. It launched in the spring of 2021 and has since been discontinued as of 2023.

== Online Play ==
Kentucky's residents can also purchase Kentucky Lottery tickets via the Kentucky Lottery website, kylottery.com. They must be registered through the Fun Club to purchase tickets online or through the mobile app.

=== Instant Play ===
Kentucky Lottery players can play Instant Play games on the Kentucky Lottery's website. There are nearly 60 games to choose from 50-cents to $20 in price, with top prizes reaching $300,000.

=== Draw Games ===
Currently, Powerball, Mega Millions, Lucky For Life, Cash Ball 225, Keno, Pick 3 and Pick 4 can be purchased.

== Fast Play ==
Fast Play is a series of terminal-generated games with instant cash prizes and a rolling jackpot. Players can ask their Kentucky Lottery retailer for a Fast Play ticket for the game they wish to play, and a ticket will be printed on demand right from the lottery terminal.

All Fast Play games are eligible to win a percentage of the rolling jackpot. The jackpot grows with every ticket sold, and jackpots start at $10,000. How to play instructions are printed on every Fast Play ticket, as well as the amount of the estimated rolling jackpot.

An individual must be 18 years old to play the Kentucky Lottery.
