= Dick Miller (disambiguation) =

Dick Miller (1928–2019) was an American character actor.

Dick Miller may also refer to:

== Sportspeople ==
- Dick Miller (American football) (1917–1994), American football player and coach
- Dick Miller (athlete) (1929–2021), British athlete
- Dick Miller (basketball) (1958–2014), American professional basketball player

== Characters ==
- Dick Miller, a character in the 1933 film Air Hostess
- Richard "Dick" Miller, a character in the 1935 film Ah, Wilderness!

== See also ==
- Richard Miller (disambiguation)
