= Richard L. Miller =

American politician

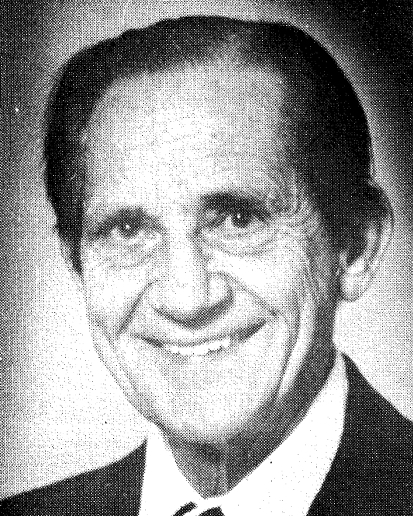

Member of the West Virginia House of Delegates from the 9th district
- In office December 1, 1974 – December 1, 1976
- Preceded by: Orton R. Karickhoff
- Succeeded by: Corlis W. Harris

Personal details
- Born: Richard Landis Miller; February 5, 1907 Deming, New Mexico, U.S.
- Died: May 27, 1983 (aged 76) Spencer, West Virginia, U.S.
- Party: Democratic
- Spouse: Ernestine Johnson (m. 1931)
- Education: Morris Harvey College

Military service
- Allegiance: United States
- Branch/service: United States Navy
- Battles/wars: World War II

Richard Landis Miller (February 5, 1907 – May 27, 1983) was an American politician who served in the West Virginia House of Delegates. A Democrat, he lost to Orton R. Karickhoff in 1972 but won a rematch in the newly-drawn 9th district two years later. He retired after one term.
