= V. Richard Miller =

American politician

Member of the Indiana Senate
- In office 1976–1988

Personal details
- Party: Republican

V. Richard Miller (July 27, 1939 – May 18, 2016) is an American former politician from the state of Indiana. A Republican, he served in the Indiana Senate from 1976 to 1988.

Born in Des Moines, Iowa, his family moved to Warsaw, Indiana during Miller's childhood. Miller married Jay Kay Rothrock on August 19, 1961, with whom he had a son and a daughter.

Miller died in Englewood, Florida at the age of 76.
