= Martha Wilkinson =

First Lady of Kentucky (1941–2014)

First Lady of Kentucky
- In role December 8, 1987 – December 10, 1991
- Governor: Wallace Wilkinson
- Preceded by: Bill Collins
- Succeeded by: Libby Jones

Personal details
- Born: Martha Carol Stafford; August 28, 1941 Casey County, Kentucky
- Died: May 7, 2014 (aged 72) Sarasota, Florida
- Party: Democratic
- Spouse: Wallace G. Wilkinson (1960–2002; his death)

Martha Carol Wilkinson (née Stafford; August 28, 1941 – May 7, 2014) was an American businesswoman and politician. She served as the first lady of Kentucky from 1987 to 1991. Born in Casey County, Kentucky, she was the wife of former Kentucky Governor Wallace G. Wilkinson.

In 1960, she married Wallace G. Wilkinson and together they started the Kentucky Paperback Gallery in 1963 which later became Wallace's College Book Company. The couple had two sons, Wallace Glenn Wilkinson Jr. and Andrew Wilkinson. Martha Wilkinson was business manager of the Wilkinson Farms.

The gown Wilkinson wore at her husband's inauguration was a gift from her sister, Katherine Rubarts. She wore it with a gold, ruby and diamond necklace given to her by Governor Wilkinson.

Martha Wilkinson created "Martha's Army" to fight adult illiteracy. Wilkinson's group used techniques such as a telephone hotline, (800)-GED-ARMY, and financial incentives to encourage Kentucky high school dropouts to earn a General Educational Development (GED) certificate. In 1990, country-music singer Waylon Jennings, who dropped out of school in the 10th grade, earned a GED through Martha's Army.

In 1991, when her husband was term limited from seeking a second consecutive term, Wilkinson announced her candidacy for governor. She withdrew from the race before the Democratic primary when polls showed her trailing Lt. Gov. Brereton Jones. She died on May 7, 2014, in Sarasota, Florida.

Preceded by Dr. Bill Collins	First Lady of Kentucky; 1987–1991	Succeeded by Libby Jones
