= E. Ray Reed =

American politician

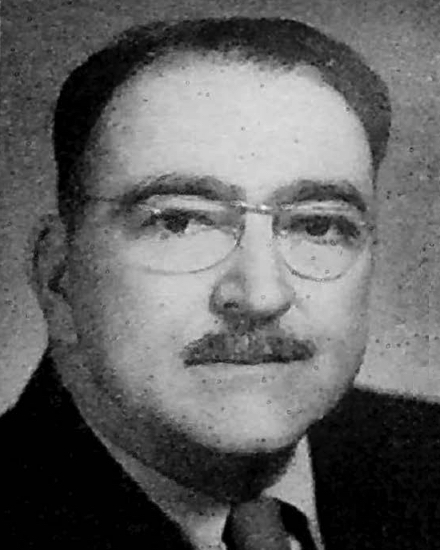

Member of the West Virginia Senate from the 4th district
- In office December 1, 1950 – December 1, 1954
- Preceded by: Orton R. Karickhoff
- Succeeded by: Brad Sayre
- In office December 1, 1940 – December 1, 1944
- Preceded by: Howard S. Johnson
- Succeeded by: Harlan Staats

Member of the West Virginia House of Delegates from Clay County
- In office December 1, 1932 – December 1, 1936
- Preceded by: Stanard W. Bryant
- Succeeded by: W. C. Bobbitt

Personal details
- Born: Edward Ray Reed; March 15, 1891 Clay, West Virginia, U.S.
- Died: February 18, 1970 (aged 78) Clay, West Virginia, U.S.
- Party: Republican
- Spouse: Lula Wilson (m. 1917)
- Education: Cumberland University

Edward Ray Reed (March 15, 1891 – February 18, 1970) was an American politician who served in both houses of the West Virginia Legislature. He was the Republican nominee for state auditor in 1956, losing a close race to incumbent Edgar B. Sims.

Party political offices
Preceded by Brad Sayre	Republican nominee for West Virginia State Auditor; 1956	Succeeded by Litz McGuire
