= Brad Sayre =

American politician

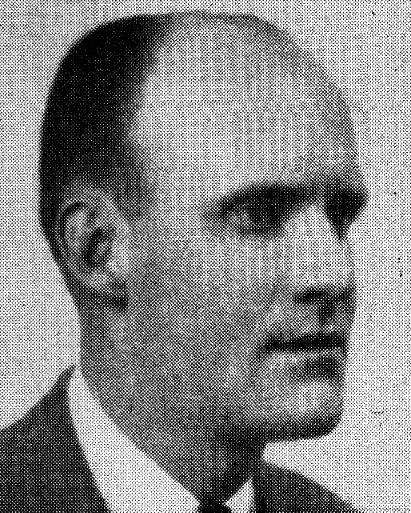

Member of the West Virginia Senate from the 4th district
- In office December 1, 1968 – December 1, 1972
- Preceded by: Randall A. Taylor
- Succeeded by: Orton A. Jones
- In office December 1, 1954 – January 31, 1957
- Preceded by: E. Ray Reed
- Succeeded by: Vernon McCoy

Member of the West Virginia House of Delegates from Jackson County
- In office December 1, 1944 – December 1, 1950
- Preceded by: Harlan Staats
- Succeeded by: Delmer Hutton

Personal details
- Born: Virgil Bradford Sayre; January 3, 1912 Cottageville, West Virginia
- Died: December 10, 1994 (aged 82) Amanda, Ohio
- Party: Republican
- Spouse: Blondis Neely (m. 1952)

Virgil Bradford "Brad" Sayre (January 3, 1912 – December 10, 1994) was an American politician who served in both houses of the West Virginia Legislature. He was the Republican nominee for state auditor in 1952, losing to incumbent Edgar B. Sims.

Party political offices
Preceded by Russell R. Bell	Republican nominee for West Virginia State Auditor; 1952	Succeeded by E. Ray Reed
