= Larry J. Hopkins =

American politician (1933–2021)

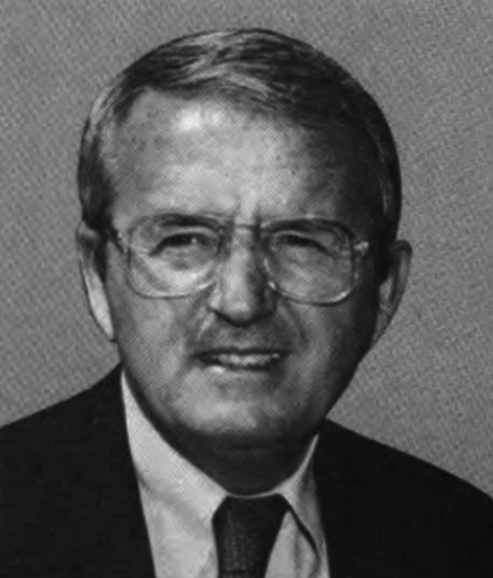
- Hopkins c. 1981

Member of the U.S. House of Representatives from Kentucky's 6th district
- In office January 3, 1979 – January 3, 1993
- Preceded by: John B. Breckinridge
- Succeeded by: Scotty Baesler

Member of the Kentucky Senate from the 12th district
- In office January 1, 1978 – December 8, 1978
- Preceded by: Joe Graves
- Succeeded by: Jack Trevey

Member of the Kentucky House of Representatives from the 78th district
- In office January 1, 1972 – January 1, 1978
- Preceded by: Russell Reynolds (redistricting)
- Succeeded by: Jack Trevey

Personal details
- Born: Larry Jones Hopkins; October 25, 1933 Detroit, Michigan, U.S.
- Died: November 15, 2021 (aged 88) Lexington, Kentucky, U.S.
- Party: Republican
- Spouse: Carolyn Pennebaker (m. 1956)
- Children: 3, including Josh
- Education: Murray State University

Military service
- Branch/service: United States Marine Corps
- Years of service: 1954–1956

Larry Jones Hopkins (October 25, 1933 – November 15, 2021) was an American businessman and politician who represented Kentucky's 6th congressional district in the United States House of Representatives from 1979 to 1993. He was the Republican nominee for governor of Kentucky in 1991 and lost to Brereton C. Jones.

He was the father of actor Josh Hopkins.

== Early life and education ==
Hopkins was born in Detroit and raised in Kentucky, the son of Louise Jones and James Glenn Hopkins. He attended public schools in the village of Wingo, Kentucky and later attended Murray State University.

== Career ==
Hopkins served in the United States Marine Corps from 1954 to 1956 and was a stockbroker with Hilliard Lyons. Hopkins served as Fayette County clerk before serving as the Kentucky House of Representatives from 1972 to 1978 and the Kentucky Senate in 1978.

=== Congress ===
He served in the United States House of Representatives from January 3, 1979, to January 3, 1993. During his tenure in Congress, Hopkins was a member of the United States House Committee on Armed Services, where he was a principal House cosponsor of the Goldwater–Nichols Act. In 1991, Hopkins ran for governor and defeated Larry Forgy in the Republican primary. Hopkins lost the general election to Brereton C. Jones who polled 540,468 votes (64.7%) to Hopkins' 294,452 (35.3%).

Hopkins did not seek re-election to the House in 1992, due in part to his loss in the race for governor and also because of his role in the House banking scandal. He was later exonerated on all charges.

=== Later career ===
He later served as director of the Tobacco Division of the Agricultural Marketing Service in the G. H. W. Bush administration. He also worked as a lobbyist for Lott & Hopkins LLC Sonny Callahan & Associates LLC.

== Personal life ==
Hopkins was married to Carolyn Pennebaker in 1956 and had two daughters and a son, Josh Hopkins, who later became an actor.

== Death ==
Hopkins died on November 15, 2021, at age 88.

U.S. House of Representatives
Preceded by John Breckinridge	Member of the U.S. House of Representatives from Kentucky's 6th congressional district 1979–1993	Succeeded by Scotty Baesler
Party political offices
Preceded by John Harper	Republican nominee for Governor of Kentucky; 1991	Succeeded by Larry Forgy
