= Wallace Wilkinson =

American politician (1941–2002)

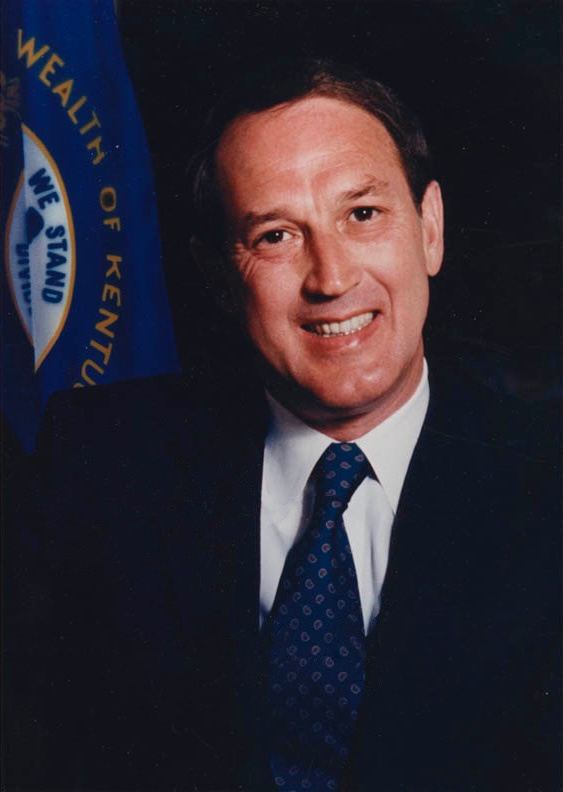
- Official Portrait, 1988

57th Governor of Kentucky
- In office December 8, 1987 – December 10, 1991
- Lieutenant: Brereton C. Jones
- Preceded by: Martha Layne Collins
- Succeeded by: Brereton C. Jones

Personal details
- Born: Wallace Glenn Wilkinson; December 12, 1941 Casey County, Kentucky, U.S.
- Died: July 5, 2002 (aged 60) Lexington, Kentucky, U.S.
- Resting place: Sarasota Memorial Park, Sarasota, Florida
- Party: Democratic
- Spouse: Martha Carol Stafford
- Education: University of Kentucky (dropped out)
- Profession: Businessman

Wallace Glenn Wilkinson (December 12, 1941 – July 5, 2002) was an American businessman and politician from the Commonwealth of Kentucky. From 1987 to 1991, he served as the state's 57th governor. Wilkinson dropped out of college at the University of Kentucky in 1962 to attend to a book retail business he started. The business rapidly became a national success, and Wilkinson re-invested his profits in real estate, farming, transportation, banking, coal, and construction ventures, becoming extremely wealthy. In 1987, he joined a crowded field in the Democratic gubernatorial primary. After running behind two former governors and the sitting lieutenant governor for most of the race, Wilkinson began to climb in the polls after hiring then-unknown campaign consultant James Carville. Wilkinson campaigned on a promise of no new taxes and advocated a state lottery as an alternative means of raising money for the state. Wilkinson surprised most political observers by winning the primary and going on to defeat his Republican challenger in the general election.

Wilkinson was able to secure passage of a constitutional amendment allowing a state lottery. He also helped craft a significant education reform bill in response to a ruling by the Kentucky Supreme Court that declared the state's entire public school system unconstitutional. Wilkinson's term was plagued by political scandal and an uneasy relationship with the state legislature. He advocated an amendment to the state constitution that would allow him to seek a second consecutive term as governor, but the amendment was defeated in the General Assembly. His wife Martha attempted to succeed him, but withdrew from the campaign amid weak support for her candidacy. Following his term as governor, Wilkinson encountered difficult financial times. In 2001, he was sued by a group of creditors, and during the proceedings, it was revealed that he was operating a Ponzi scheme to keep his businesses afloat. Both he and his wife Martha filed for bankruptcy later that year. In 2002, Wilkinson was hospitalized with arterial blockages. His condition was complicated by a recurrence of Non-Hodgkin lymphoma. He suffered a stroke on July 4, 2002, and his family withdrew his life support the following day in accordance with his previously expressed wishes.

== Early life ==
Wallace Wilkinson was born on a farm in Casey County, Kentucky, about 5 miles (8.0 km) southwest of the city of Liberty, on December 12, 1941. The son of Hershel and Cleo (Lay) Wilkinson, he had two older brothers and a younger sister. His parents were farmers and also operated a small general store. When Wilkinson was four years old, the family moved to Liberty, and the family opened Wilkinson's Grocery. During his childhood, he delivered newspapers, sold popcorn from a street stand, and co-owned a shoe shine parlor with a boyhood friend. He also accompanied his father to sell produce from the back of a truck. It was during one such trip that he met Martha Carol Stafford, whose parents owned a grocery store about 10 miles (16 km) away. The two dated throughout high school and were married in 1960. They had two children: Wallace Glenn Wilkinson Jr. (1970 – 2014) and Andrew Stafford Wilkinson (1972);

Wilkinson was a member of the freshman basketball team at Liberty High School. Using profits from his early business ventures, he purchased a business wardrobe that earned him the title of best dressed member of his senior class. He graduated from high school in 1959, but the poor curriculum there left him without the credits he needed to gain admission to the University of Kentucky's engineering program. He began selling livestock feed in Scottsville, Kentucky, and also worked at a venetian blind factory while taking classes at Campbellsville College to earn the credits he needed. In 1962, he moved to Lexington, Kentucky, and enrolled at the University of Kentucky. While in college, he worked at Kennedy Book Store in Lexington. Later, he and two friends borrowed money to open the Kentucky Paperback Gallery in Lexington; Wilkinson left school later that year to attend to the business full-time. At the time, Kentucky high school students were required to purchase their own textbooks, but there was no marketplace for buying and selling used books; Wilkinson's business catered to this market and was highly successful.

== Business ventures ==
Wilkinson opened Wallace's Book Store in June 1965 after a local stockbroker helped him raise the initial capital needed through a public stock offering. By this time, Kentucky had adopted free textbook legislation at the behest of Governor Julian Carroll, so Wilkinson transitioned to selling college textbooks to students at the University of Kentucky. Throughout the 1960s, Wilkinson refused to pay the state sales tax on his transactions; he and Joe Kennedy, the owner of Kennedy Book Store, both claimed that paying the tax put them at a competitive disadvantage with the university's book store, which did not pay state taxes because it was operated by the university, a tax exempt entity. In 1977, the state Board of Tax Appeals ruled that all three bookstores should have been paying the tax, but by this time, the statute of limitations had expired, and none of the three were required to pay any back taxes. Wallace's Book Store continued to expand rapidly, opening retail stores in twenty-eight states and becoming one of the country's largest book firms. In January 1971, he considered issuing more stock to raise capital to buy Providence, Rhode Island–based Barnes & Noble, but the executive committee of Wallace's was averse to purchasing a company so far away and blocked the move. In April 1977, Wilkinson was cited for false and misleading advertisement in conjunction with claims made in radio ads for Wallace's Book Store claiming they were offering the first discounts in history on new college textbooks. In a court filing, Wilkinson admitted the claims were untrue, promised to stop airing the ads, and agreed to refund any money overpaid by customers.

With the success of his chain of bookstores, Wilkinson pursued other business ventures in the fields of real estate development, farming, transportation, banking, coal interests, and construction. He purchased several private aircraft to help him tend to his diverse interests throughout the state, and in 1973, created Wilkinson Flying Service to keep the planes busy when he wasn't using them. After investing in the unfinished Bluegrass Commerce Center in Lexington in early 1977, he purchased one-third interest in the Purcell building on Lexington's Vine Street later that year. The building was only partially occupied, but had become more valuable because of the opening of nearby Rupp Arena in October 1976 and a new Hyatt hotel in May 1977. Developers Donald and Dudley Webb developed plans to construct the Vine Center on the block; by May 1979, they had options to buy every property on the block except Wilkinson's interest in the Purcell building. Unwilling to meet Wilkinson's asking price, they instead formed a partnership with him to co-develop the Vine Center. When Wilkinson eventually sold his interest in the venture at the end of 1981, he turned a profit of at least $1.3 million on his investment. Next, he formed a public-private partnership with the city of Lexington to construct the Capital Plaza Hotel in 1983. The city provided $3 million in capital and another $8.5 million in guaranteed loans to supplement Wilkinson's $1.15 million investment. Wallace's Book Stores was given 95% ownership in the hotel, allowing the company to shield $2 million in assets from federal income taxes and claim over $400,000 in tax credits.

Despite playing a major role in the Lexington real estate market, Wilkinson was fiercely protective of his privacy; for a time, he even refused to allow newspapers to publish pictures of him. His public profile began to rise when he announced plans to construct the 50-story World Coal Center on the corner of Main and Limestone streets in Lexington. When completed, it would be the largest office complex between Atlanta and Chicago. Wilkinson hoped that all the major coal companies in the state would relocate their offices to the center, making it a hub for the international coal market. Shortly after Wilkinson demolished the historic Phoenix Hotel to make way for the building, the coal market experienced a pronounced lull, and the empty lot where the proposed coal center would have stood was derided as "Wally's Folly" and "Lake Wilkinson". In 1984, the Lexington-Fayette Urban County Government secured a lease from Wilkinson to develop a temporary municipal park on the site. Wilkinson conceded that he would not be able to develop the proposed World Coal Center in the near-term, and Lexington mayor Scotty Baesler wanted to improve the property before the city hosted the finals of the 1985 NCAA men's basketball tournament at Rupp Arena. In early 1985, Wilkinson struck a deal with the state and urban county governments to retain the park and build a public library and parking garage while allowing Wilkinson to construct and operate a 21-story apartment complex above the garage. Critics claimed that the city-county government bailed Wilkinson out of a bad investment by purchasing the property from him and by giving him a government-subsidized, low interest rate on his $12 million mortgage for the apartment building.

== Alleged kidnapping by Jerome Jernigan ==
On April 10, 1984, Wilkinson was allegedly kidnapped by a man named Jerome Jernigan. In 1977, Wilkinson had provided Jernigan with start-up money for Jernigan Export Timber, Inc., a company that manufactured and exported wood veneers internationally. The company went defunct around the time of Jernigan's divorce from his wife, the secretary-treasurer of the company, in December 1980. Jernigan's son, Victor, continued to work for Wilkinson in another capacity until 1982.

According to Wilkinson, in the months leading up to the alleged kidnapping, Jernigan had come to Wilkinson's office several times demanding money he claimed he was owed from his prior business dealings with Wilkinson. Wilkinson said he had been making the requested payments, but that when he refused Jernigan's request on April 10, Jernigan presented him with a four-page suicide note, then produced a pistol and told Wilkinson, "I'm going to kill you first." Wilkinson further alleged that Jernigan forced him to drive to the Crowne Plaza Hotel in Frankfort, a hotel Wilkinson owned, at gunpoint. The two spent the night at the hotel, and sometime during the night, Wilkinson contacted James Aldridge, president of New Farmers National Bank in Glasgow, Kentucky. Wilkinson, who owned an interest in New Farmers National Bank, told Aldridge he needed $500,000 as soon as possible. The next day, Wilkinson and Jernigan flew to Glasgow aboard a plane operated by Wilkinson Flying Service, another company owned by Wilkinson. Wilkinson said Jernigan threatened to kill employees at the company if Wilkinson attempted to alert them. Aldridge met Wilkinson and Jernigan with the money Wilkinson had requested at the Glasgow Municipal Airport. Upon their arrival, Wilkinson paid Jernigan $500,000 and was released unharmed.

After his release, Wilkinson alerted the FBI, and Jernigan was arrested the same day in Lexington. Upon his arrest, he was in possession of two pistols, six sets of handcuffs, and $400,000 in cash. Jernigan told authorities that he and Wilkinson had spent the previous night at the Crowne Plaza negotiating a settlement to their differences stemming from their earlier business relationship. The terms of the settlement, Jernigan maintained, included a $500,000 cash payment from Wilkinson, part of which would finance a new business venture similar to Jernigan's previous veneer export business. Wilkinson would also furnish Jernigan with a car, a furnished apartment in Lexington, and a salary of $5,000 a month. Jernigan stated that after the $500,000 was paid, Wilkinson decided to back out of the settlement and portray the encounter as a crime. Wilkinson denied Jernigan's allegations and maintained that the money – which was later recovered – was demanded by Jernigan as a ransom for his release.

Weeks later, Jernigan filed a counter-suit against Wilkinson in Fayette County circuit court. He asked the court to award him $50 million in punitive damages and to determine the profits made by his and Wilkinson's veneer company, of which he would receive half. A judge ordered the case moved to Louisville because the alleged crime was committed in Glasgow, in the state's western district. State charges against Jernigan, which included kidnapping and carrying a concealed deadly weapon, were dropped so that the federal extortion charges could take precedence. Over the objection of his legal counsel, the court ordered Jernigan to undergo a psychiatric evaluation to determine whether he was insane or mentally incompetent for his own defense. The court-appointed psychiatrist found Jernigan competent to stand trial, and he was released in late May on a $25,000 bond.

After his release on bond, Jernigan returned to the room at the Continental Inn in Lexington where he had been living prior to his arrest. On July 18, 1984, Jernigan's son Randy found him dead in the room. An autopsy showed that Jernigan suffered from coronary atherosclerosis, and heart disease was officially listed as the cause of death. Lexington police determined that there was no evidence to suggest foul play. Jernigan's ex-wife continued to pursue Jernigan's case against Wilkinson, but a Fayette County Circuit Court Judge awarded Wilkinson a summary judgment to dismiss the case in 1986.

== Political life ==
After announcing his plans for the World Coal Center, Wilkinson began attending meetings of the Lexington Urban City Council, where he advocated his fiscally conservative political views. He was an admirer of Ronald Reagan, although he said he wished Reagan was a Democrat like himself. In 1979, Wilkinson became involved with Terry McBrayer's campaign against John Y. Brown Jr. in the Democratic gubernatorial primary. He held a critical fundraiser for Scotty Baesler's 1981 Lexington mayoral campaign, although most of the businessmen in Lexington favored Baesler's opponent. In the 1983 Democratic gubernatorial primary, he served as finance chairman for Harvey Sloane's campaign. When Sloane lost a close race to Lieutenant Governor Martha Layne Collins, Republican nominee Jim Bunning tried to enlist the support of Sloane and his supporters, including Wilkinson. After a month of consideration, however, Wilkinson endorsed the entire Democratic ticket. The following year, he managed former governor Brown's brief senatorial campaign. Already considering running for governor in 1987, Wilkinson had hoped to remove Brown as a potential competitor for that office by helping him get elected to the Senate, but Brown ended his campaign early for health reasons. Through his work in various campaigns, Wilkinson found that he enjoyed the challenges of competing in the political arena. He lobbied the General Assembly to pass a multi-bank holding company bill allowing banking companies to own more than one Kentucky bank. The bill passed in 1984.

=== Democratic primary of 1987 ===
In April 1985, Wilkinson formed a campaign committee in advance of the 1987 gubernatorial election. Relatively unknown statewide, Wilkinson was the first candidate to enter the race. The Democratic primary field eventually grew to include two previous Kentucky governors, John Y. Brown Jr. and Julian Carroll; sitting Lieutenant Governor Steve Beshear, who would later win two terms as governor in 2007 and 2011; and Grady Stumbo, cabinet secretary for Governor Martha Layne Collins. Early in the race, Brown was the clear-cut favorite, while Wilkinson was picked to finish fifth. Wilkinson financed his own campaign and campaign manager Danny Briscoe suggested that he hire a campaign consultant to reach out to the state's large concentration of undecided voters. After a few interviews, Wilkinson hired a then-unknown political consultant named James Carville; Carville later went on to chair Bill Clinton's successful presidential campaign in 1992.

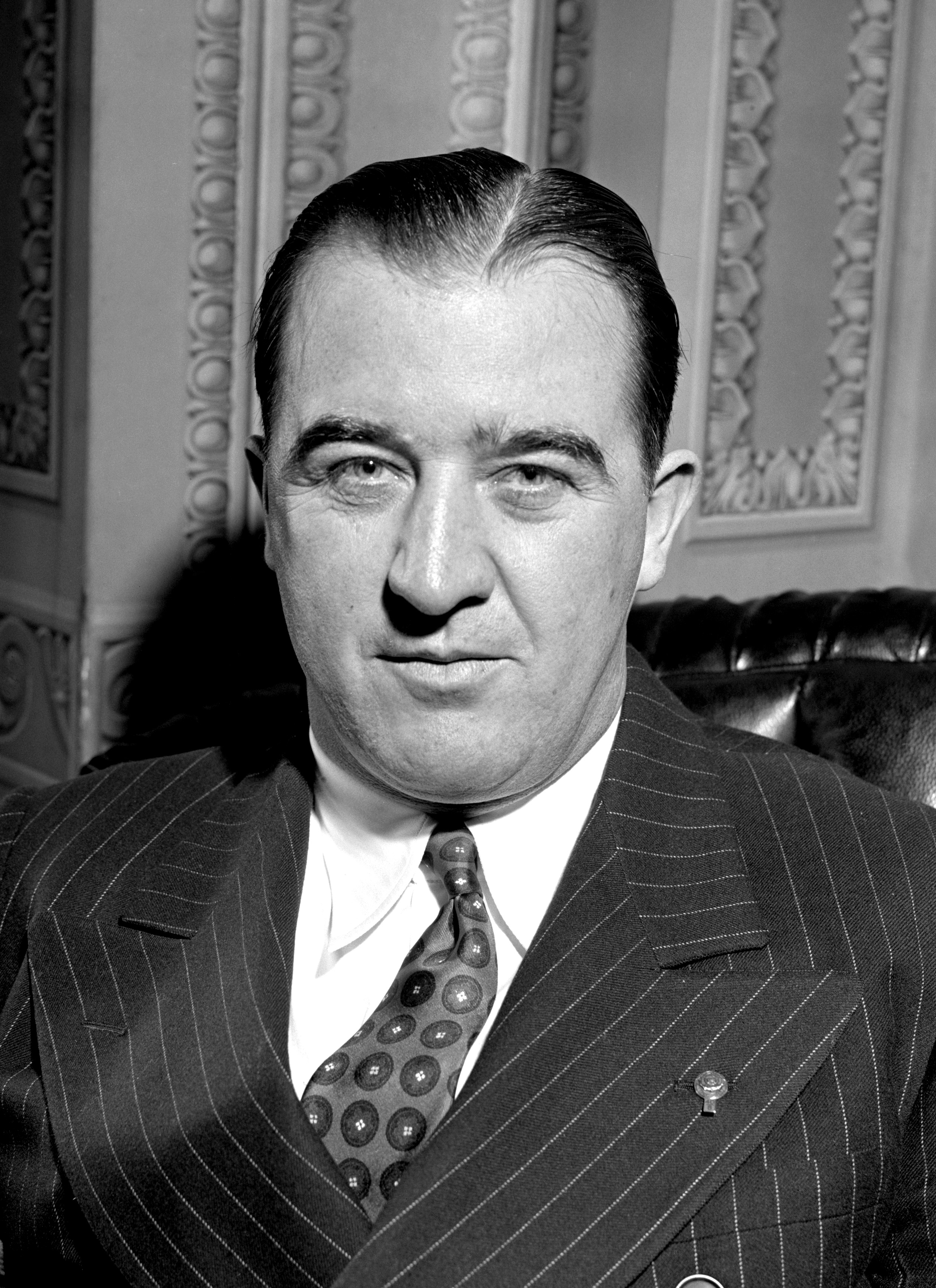
Happy Chandler's endorsement boosted Wilkinson's candidacy.

Beshear, considered the second strongest candidate in the primary race, spent much of the campaign attacking Brown, and Brown spent time and resources responding to Beshear's attacks. Meanwhile, Wilkinson attacked all of his opponents in the race as political insiders while touting his own rise from poverty to financial success. He called the incentive package that sitting governor Martha Layne Collins had offered to lure a Toyota manufacturing plant to the state "a massive mistake and terrible deal" that had made Kentucky "an international laughingstock". He also claimed that both Brown and Beshear would raise taxes and proposed a state lottery, which he claimed would generate $70 million annually for the state's coffers, as an alternative to higher taxes. The proposal proved particularly popular in Northern Kentucky, where residents routinely traveled to neighboring Ohio to play that state's lottery. Wilkinson also advocated for wholesale education reform, stating that Kentucky's children "don't have a learning problem; they've got a schooling problem." Two-time former governor A. B. "Happy" Chandler gave Wilkinson's campaign further credibility with his endorsement.

In late April, Brown still held a 20 percentage point lead in public opinion polling. However, as Beshear began to slip in the polls, Wilkinson moved up. By Memorial Day weekend, he was polling second among the candidates. Brown largely ignored Wilkinson until a week before the election, when he began running ads questioning the amount of money Wilkinson claimed would be generated by a state lottery. Wilkinson won the primary, garnering 36 percent of the vote to 26 percent for Brown, 18 percent for Beshear, 12 percent for Stumbo, and 6 percent for Carroll. In total, Wilkinson spent a record $4 million during the primary campaign. Kentucky historian Thomas D. Clark opined that Wilkinson's lavish spending during the campaign prompted the legislature to adopt campaign finance reform measures.

=== Gubernatorial campaign of 1987 ===
Democrats enjoyed a 3-to-1 voter registration advantage in Kentucky, and while he had been the underdog in the primary campaign, Wilkinson became the heavy favorite against the Republican nominee, State Representative John Harper of Shepherdsville. Larry Forgy, who had been groomed for the Republican nomination, unexpectedly dropped out of the race before the primary, leaving the party at a significant disadvantage with a largely unknown and underfunded candidate. While Harper began his general election campaign immediately, Wilkinson made few public appearances – except for fundraisers – until the second week in September. He also refused to endorse the $125 million education reform measure that sitting governor Martha Layne Collins had guided through the legislature in 1985, which cost him the endorsement of the Kentucky Education Association. The association endorsed Harper, marking the first time in its history it had endorsed a Republican gubernatorial candidate, but endorsed Brereton C. Jones, the Democratic candidate for lieutenant governor.

Harper attacked Wilkinson's lottery proposal as "Alice in Wonderland" economics. In addition, Harper's campaign raised a number of ethical issues with regard to Wilkinson's business dealings. Gary Stafford, Wilkinson's brother-in-law who was serving as president of Wallace's Book Store, pleaded guilty to illegal wiretapping and rolling back the odometers on company vehicles. The company was also forced to pay $44,641 in back taxes. Further, Republican state chairman Bob Gable questioned whether Wilkinson had helped Italian businessmen circumvent laws that made it difficult to export Italian currency by disguising real estate ventures as legitimate business transactions with Jernigan Export Timber. Gable also hired a private investigator who determined that there was "substantial reason" to suspect that foul play was involved in the death of Wilkinson's business partner, Jerome Jernigan. Despite Gable's allegations and the investigator's findings, Lexington police officials said they saw no reason to reopen the investigation. Harper was at a substantial fundraising disadvantage, raising only $225,000 for the entire campaign compared to Wilkinson's $8 million. This left him unable to purchase enough media time to solidify any of the ethical questions about Wilkinson in the voters' minds. Wilkinson's campaign also delved into Harper's personal life, admitting that it tipped off the media about Harper's son, who had been shot to death in an attempted burglary.

In the general election, Wilkinson defeated Harper by a vote of 504,674 to 273,141. By capturing 65% of the vote, he broke Julian Carroll's record of 62.8%. Low voter turnout prohibited him from setting the record for most votes received by a candidate in a Kentucky gubernatorial election, and he received several thousand fewer votes than Brereton Jones, the victorious Democratic candidate for lieutenant governor. He carried 115 of Kentucky's 120 counties – besting Carroll's old record of 99 – but lost in Fayette, his county of residence. A poll conducted by a Louisville television station after the election showed that 76% of voters wished they had another candidate to vote for.

=== Legislative session of 1988 ===
Even before he officially took office, some of Wilkinson's public comments set up an adversarial relationship with the General Assembly. Just two days after his election, he told reporters that he would exert the "full power" of his office toward getting his agenda approved by the legislature and that he "conceive of a situation" where he would use his political action committee (PAC), Kentuckians for a Better Future, to help defeat legislators who opposed him. Under governors Brown and Collins, the legislature had become increasingly independent of the governor, and Lexington Herald-Leader reporters opined that House Speaker Don Blandford and Senate President Pro Tem John "Eck" Rose would be reluctant to cede power back to the chief executive. During the 1988 legislative session, Rose introduced a bill setting a limit of $4,000 on the amount PACs could contribute to an individual's campaigns during a single election and a limit of $2,000 on the amount any individual could contribute to a single PAC in a given election. A month later, Wilkinson recanted, saying he "misspoke" and only intended to use his PAC to promote passage of the lottery amendment. Despite the governor's promise, the legislature passed Rose's bill.

Tensions also developed between Wilkinson and Lieutenant Governor-Elect Jones soon after the election. During the campaign, Jones was quoted as saying that he had talked with Wilkinson about being more open with the press and said that, if elected, he would not be a "yes man" for Wilkinson. At a press conference shortly after the election, Wilkinson said he did not know what role Jones would play in his administration and that much of it would depend on what Jones had meant when he said he did not agree with all of Wilkinson's positions. In late November 1987, Wilkinson announced that Jones would spearhead the promotion of the administration's agricultural agenda. The Lexington Herald-Leader reported that this would not be Jones' primary role in the administration but that no other specifics had been provided.

Although amendments removing Kentucky's constitutional prohibition on a state lottery had been introduced in every legislative session since the mid-1970s, Wilkinson's election provided the issue with fresh momentum, and the General Assembly passed the amendment by the required majorities in the 1988 session. Another amendment passed during Wilkinson's term required landowner approval before strip mining could occur on a piece of property. This amendment essentially overturned a 1956 court ruling and negated the practice of issuing broad form deeds which allowed property owners to sell their mineral rights while retaining ownership of structures and other improvements above-ground. A third amendment for which Wilkinson advocated would have allowed elected state officials to succeed themselves in office. During his gubernatorial campaign, he insisted that he would not seek to have such an amendment apply to himself, but shortly after his election, he reversed course and insisted on an amendment that did not exclude present incumbents. The amendment became one of Wilkinson's top priorities in the 1988 legislative session, and he threatened to work against legislators who opposed it. Legislators proposed that a succession amendment include provisions to lengthen the terms of state legislators to maintain a balance of power between the executive and legislative branches; Wilkinson insisted that the General Assembly pass a "clean" succession amendment, free from any other provisions that might diminish the amendment's chances of being approved by the state's voters. The Kentucky House of Representatives passed such an amendment, but the state Senate continued to press for legislative concessions, proposing annual legislative sessions and mandatory runoffs in gubernatorial primaries when one candidate did not receive a majority of the votes cast. When Wilkinson rejected both proposals, Senate leaders refused to bring the amendment to the floor for a vote. Wilkinson's reversal on his campaign promise not to seek succession for present incumbents damaged his reputation.

Wilkinson's advocacy for the amendment further damaged his relationship with Lieutenant Governor Jones because Jones had already announced his intention to run for governor in 1991. After the session, Jones told a crowd in Owensboro that if Wilkinson called a special session to insist that legislators pass his educational agenda, that the General Assembly would probably "throw it back in his face". In response, Wilkinson said that Jones should "be involved in improving the process, not be so negative about everything" and "pay attention to his own business". A Lexington Herald-Leader story noted that a promised news conference to elaborate on Jones' role in the administration had not yet happened and that "[m]ost observers expect it never will". The two men's relationship continued to be strained throughout their terms; Jones later described it as "terrible".

=== Creation of the Kentucky Lottery ===
Leaders of the Southern Baptists and United Methodists led opposition to the amendment during Wilkinson's administration, activating the Coalition Against a State Lottery. Despite the opposition, Kentucky voters approved the lottery amendment by a vote of 694,577 to 446,937 in the November 1988 elections. Days after the election, Wilkinson signed a proclamation calling a special legislative session to begin November 28 to pass legislation to implement the lottery. The call instructed the legislature to consider a bill based on the recommendations of Wilkinson's lottery commission. The recommendations included the establishment of a lottery board whose president and members would be appointed by the governor and could only be removed by the governor, and earmarked the first year's proceeds to be split evenly between early childhood education programs, programs for the elderly, and a one-time bonus to veterans of the Vietnam War. Legislators insisted on more legislative control of the lottery and did not favor explicit earmarks for the proceeds, preferring to allocate them in the 1990 legislative session. They also objected to the lottery board's exemption from open records and open meetings laws.

Immediately after the session convened, Democratic leadership in both houses of the General Assembly announced they would not support earmarking lottery funds, but would let them accumulate in escrow until the 1990 legislative session. On December 14, legislators adjourned the session after passing a bill that created an eight-member lottery board, headed by a president appointed by the governor and confirmed by the other seven members. The other seven members of the board would serve staggered terms, would be appointed by the governor, and be confirmed by the Senate. The legislation also escrowed proceeds until the 1990 General Assembly and specified that the first expenditures from those proceeds would fund a one-time bonus to veterans of the Vietnam War. The vote on the legislation was 32–5 in the Senate and 92–6 in the House. Several Republican amendments, including one by Senator David L. Williams to implement a local option for counties to decide whether or not to sell lottery tickets, were defeated on party-line votes. While the legislation did not implement all of Wilkinson's proposals for the lottery, he nonetheless praised it as a "very good" bill.

=== Education reform ===
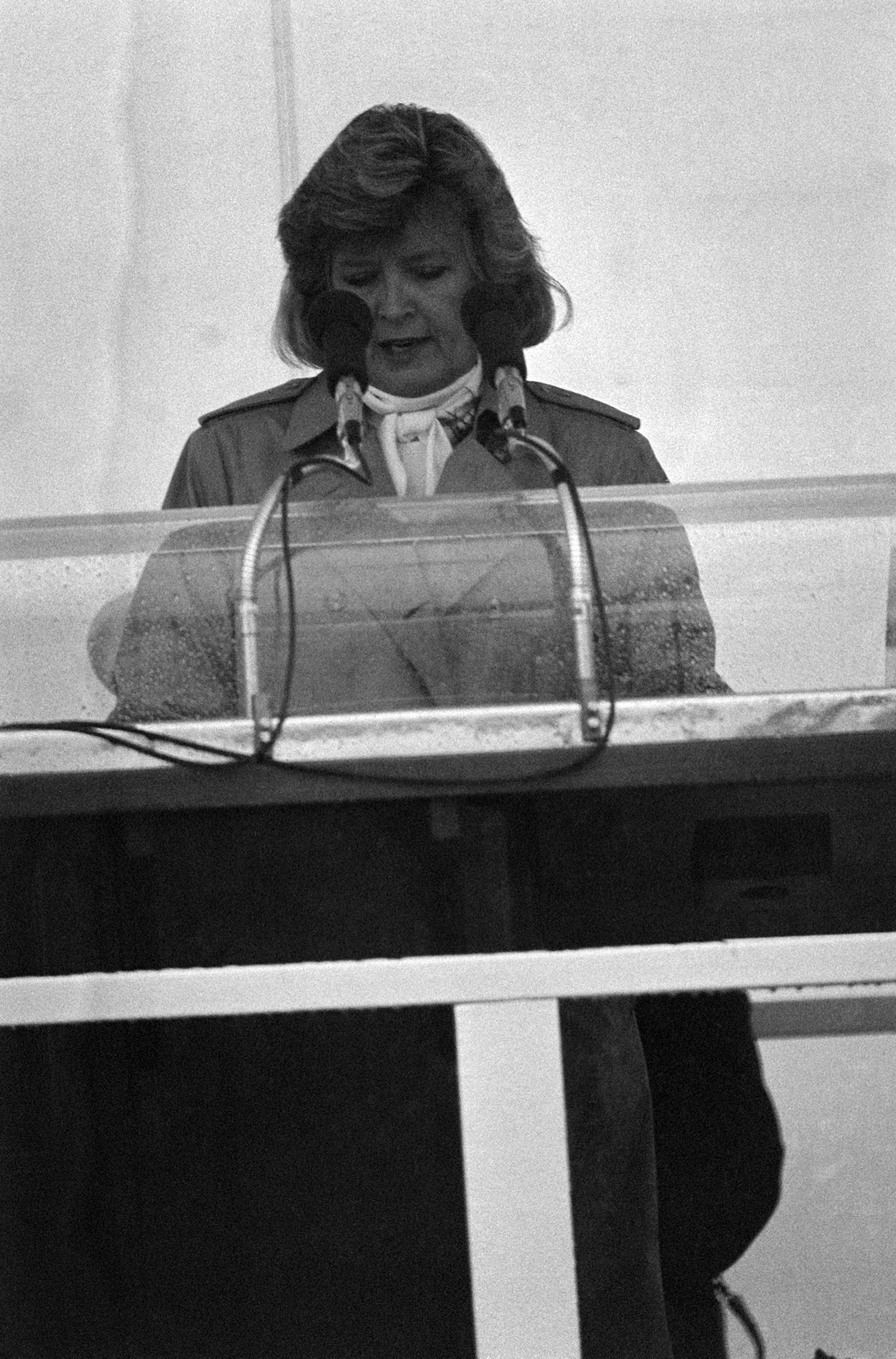
A lawsuit to reform Kentucky's educational system began under Wilkinson's predecessor, Martha Layne Collins

On May 31, 1988, Franklin County circuit court judge Ray Corns issued a ruling in the case of Council for Better Education v. Collins, et al. stating that Kentucky's system of school financing was unconstitutional. The suit was brought against Wilkinson's predecessor, Martha Layne Collins, and several members of the state government by a group of poor school districts as a means to equalize funding for all the state's school districts. An advocate for education, Wilkinson dropped the governor's office's defense in the suit and joined the plaintiffs when Corns' decision was appealed to the Kentucky Supreme Court. On appeal, the Supreme Court declared Kentucky's entire public school system unconstitutional and mandated that the legislature reform it.

Although state legislators maintained that reforming the public school system was too large an issue to tackle during the 60-day legislative session of 1990 and requested that Wilkinson call a special legislative session in June 1990 to consider the issue, the governor insisted that the issue be resolved during the regular session and said that he would not allow consideration of tax increases to fund improvements in the system if he had to call a special session. Wilkinson presented a budget proposal to the General Assembly that contained measures increasing taxes on cigarettes and corporations and eliminating sales tax exemptions on legal, engineering, and advertising services. Legislators favored raising the sales tax to six percent instead. For much of the legislative session, Wilkinson remained steadfastly opposed to an increased sales tax, repeatedly calling it a "dead issue" and threatening to veto it. Then on March 9, 1990, Wilkinson announced that he would drop his opposition to the tax in exchange for the Assembly's approval of a $600 million bond issue to finance road improvements he had promised during the campaign. The Lexington Herald-Leader called the move "a stunning reversal" and noted that Wilkinson would not comment on why he changed his mind. With the impasse between the legislature and Wilkinson resolved, House Speaker Don Blandford announced that the remainder of the session would focus only on approving the state budget and passing the court-mandated education reforms; any bills still in committees would not be brought to a vote, he said. On April 11, 1990, the Assembly passed the Kentucky Education Reform Act (KERA) to comply with the Supreme Court's decision. Besides increasing funding for schools, it mandated high performance measures and held schools accountable for meeting them. Educators hailed the legislation as being among the nation's best education reform plans.

Even after KERA was passed, disagreements between Wilkinson and the legislature continued. The $600 million bond issue for road construction that had been the price for Wilkinson's support of the sales tax was modified to include language that allowed the legislature to determine where the roads were constructed. Wilkinson threatened to veto the measure, claiming he did not need the General Assembly's approval to issue the bonds, but ultimately, he chose to allow it to become law without his signature. Wilkinson vetoed 21 bills passed by the legislature, but 13 of those vetoes were overridden; it was the most gubernatorial vetoes overridden in a single session in modern times. Most of the overridden vetoes were on bills strengthening the legislative branch relative to the executive branch. The General Assembly also voted to send two proposed constitutional amendments that strengthened the legislative branch relative to the executive to voters for ratification. One allowed the legislature to call itself into session – a power constitutionally reserved for the governor – if two-thirds of its members signed a petition to do so. The other allowed a committee of legislators to suspend regulations enacted by the executive branch between legislative sessions until the full legislature re-convened. Through his political action committee, Wilkinson opposed both measures, and both were rejected by the state's voters in the November 1990 elections.

The political debates and posturing leading up to the passing of KERA also permanently breached the relationship between Wilkinson and Lieutenant Governor Jones. During a teachers' rally in Frankfort, Jones was sympathetic to their demands for more money for education than Wilkinson was supporting. Jones wanted to speak to the crowd that had gathered outside the Capitol. While in the governor's office, Wilkinson told Jones that if he spoke to the crowd, he should never "step foot [sic] in this office again." Jones defied Wilkinson by speaking to the teachers and, according to Penny Miller, editor of Jones' public papers, never again entered Wilkinson's office.

=== Other matters of Wilkinson's term ===
Wilkinson also helped to advance economic development in the state. During his tenure, Delta Air Lines nearly doubled the number of people it employed at the Cincinnati/Northern Kentucky International Airport; Wilkinson secured Delta's expansion by agreeing to limit the company's sales tax liability on jet fuel to $4 million annually. Additionally, Scott Paper Company opened a plant near Owensboro and North American Stainless, a Spanish-owned steel company, located a plant near Carrollton. During his term in office, Wilkinson served on the Education Commission of the States, the Southern Growth Policies Board, and the Council of the State Governments and the Southern States Energy Board. He was elected chair of the Southern Governors' Association in 1990 and served on the Education Commission of the States' Policy and Priorities Committee.

The Wilkinson administration was dogged by ethical questions that eventually resulted in prosecution of some members. Before being elected governor, Wilkinson asked the Kentucky attorney general to rule on his ownership of the Holiday Inn Capital Plaza Hotel in Frankfort. The ruling stated that he should sell the hotel, and in November 1987, Kentucky Central Life Insurance, a state-regulated company, purchased the property for $12 million, which included $8.2 million of debt. Kentucky Central became insolvent in 1994 and was ordered into liquidation. The following year, Kentucky Insurance Commissioner George Nichols III assumed the liquidation and brought suit against Wilkinson stating that the property was only worth $6 million. Franklin County Circuit Judge Earl O'Bannon dismissed the lawsuit on the grounds that Wilkinson had not knowingly participated in Kentucky Central's breach of financial responsibility, even though it had, in his words, an "odor of politics."

Further, an FBI (Operation Boptrot) investigation of the Kentucky General Assembly led to Wilkinson's nephew, Bruce N. Wilkinson, who served as his appointment secretary. Bruce Wilkinson was convicted of extortion, fined $20,000, and sentenced to three years in prison. Wallace Wilkinson was investigated by a grand jury but never indicted. He vehemently denied any wrongdoing.

In 1990, Wilkinson's wife, Martha, announced that she would seek the Democratic gubernatorial nomination in 1991. The move was widely seen as a surrogate candidacy so that her husband could continue his administration for a second consecutive term. Her challengers included Lieutenant Governor Jones, Lexington mayor Scotty Baesler, and Dr. Floyd G. Poore, the former Kentucky highway director. With polls consistently showing little support for her candidacy, Mrs. Wilkinson dropped out of the race in May 1991. Earlier in the year, Wallace Wilkinson was diagnosed with limited-stage Non-Hodgkin lymphoma. This diagnosis was also a factor in Ms. Wilkinson's withdrawal from the race. Wallace underwent surgery at the Mayo Clinic in Rochester, Minnesota, then received radiation therapy at the University of Kentucky. These treatments eliminated all signs of the disease by 1993, and doctors gave Wilkinson an excellent chance of recovery.

As Wilkinson's term ended, he appointed himself to a six-year term on the University of Kentucky's board of regents. The move was unprecedented, and was particularly controversial because of Wilkinson's open feuds with Charles T. Wethington Jr., the university president. An incensed legislature passed a law shortly thereafter that dissolved the existing boards of trustees at all Kentucky public colleges and universities and mandated that they be reconstituted by allowing the governor to select each member from a list of three candidates recommended by an independent review board. Jones, who succeeded Wilkinson as governor, used the provisions of the law to remove Wilkinson and several of his appointees from the university boards.

== Later life and death ==
After his service as governor, Wilkinson returned to his business pursuits. In the early 1990s, he began borrowing money to keep his bookstore business solvent and to support his lavish lifestyle. His interest in running for another non-consecutive term as governor appeared to be dampened by the system of public financing that Kentucky had in place at that time for gubernatorial elections. In 1995, he published his memoir entitled You Can't Do That, Governor!; a major theme of the book was his disdain for conventional wisdom and political norms. In 1999, he launched ECampus.com, an Internet book retailer. Among the investors in the company were Wendy's founder Dave Thomas, Long John Silver's founder James Patterson, and Ohio State University president William English Kirwan.

On February 5, 2001, a group of Wilkinson's creditors filed suit to have his companies seized. During the ensuing bankruptcy proceedings, Wilkinson admitted that his liabilities exceeded his assets by $300 million. During the proceedings, it was revealed that Wilkinson had been financially insolvent since 1992 and was operating a Ponzi scheme, paying his creditors with money borrowed from others rather than his own profits. He had paid no federal income taxes since 1991. At his deposition in June 2001, Wilkinson invoked his Fifth Amendment privilege against self-incrimination over 140 times. Wallace's Bookstore was liquidated for just over $31 million, and ecampus.com was sold for $2.5 million. Wilkinson's wife, Martha, also filed for bankruptcy; his sons were forced to sell their homes to repay loans made to them by their father. During the bankruptcy proceedings, the Wilkinsons moved from Lexington to Naples, Florida.

While in Lexington for a deposition on May 26, 2002, Wilkinson began to experience chest pains and was admitted to St. Joseph Hospital. Doctors diagnosed him with arterial blockages and scheduled him for arterial bypass surgery. Before the surgery could be performed, however, doctors discovered another lymphatic mass. Wilkinson began taking chemotherapy, and doctors removed the mass on June 4, 2002. Wilkinson was placed on life support on June 26, 2002. He suffered a stroke on July 4, 2002. Wilkinson had previously instructed his family not to continue life support after all hope of recovery was gone; accordingly, they decided to withdraw life support, and Wilkinson died on July 5, 2002. He was originally buried at Blue Grass Memorial Gardens in Nicholasville, Kentucky. In August 2002, his coffin was moved to a locked mausoleum at Sarasota Memorial Park in Sarasota, Florida; the family chose July 4, 2002 as the date of death for his marker. The city of Liberty dubbed the stretch of the U.S. 127 bypass that runs through the city Wallace Wilkinson Boulevard in 1987.

== See also ==
- Central Virginia Community College v. Katz, an important U.S. Supreme Court case that arose from the bankruptcy of Wilkinson's bookstore company.

Political offices
Preceded by Martha L. Collins	Governor of Kentucky; 1987–1991	Succeeded by Brereton Jones
Party political offices
Preceded by Martha L. Collins	Democratic nominee for Governor of Kentucky; 1987	Succeeded by Brereton Jones
