= 1987 Kentucky gubernatorial election =

- November 3, 1987
- Turnout: 42.1% (▼14.2%)
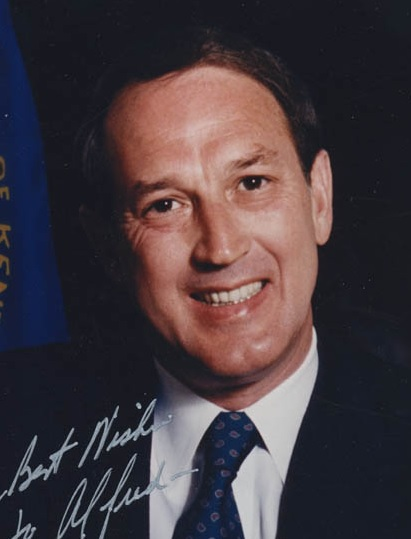

Nominee	Wallace Wilkinson	John Harper
Party	Democratic	Republican
Popular vote	504,674	273,141
Percentage	64.50%	34.91%
- Wilkinson: 50–60% 60–70% 70–80% 80–90% Harper: 50–60% 60–70%
Governor before election
Martha Layne Collins
Democratic
Elected Governor
Wallace Wilkinson
Democratic

The 1987 Kentucky gubernatorial election was held on November 3, 1987. Democratic nominee Wallace Wilkinson defeated Republican nominee John Harper with 64.50% of the vote.

== Primary elections ==
Primary elections were held on May 26, 1987.

=== Democratic primary ===
==== Candidates ====
- Wallace Wilkinson, businessman
- John Y. Brown Jr., former Governor
- Steve Beshear, incumbent Lieutenant Governor and future Governor
- W. Grady Stumbo, former Secretary of the Kentucky Cabinet for Human Resources
- Julian Carroll, former Governor
- Stanley Luttrell
- Dinwiddle Lampton Jr.

==== Results ====
Results by county: Wilkinson: 20–30%; 30–40%; 40–50%; 50–60%; 60–70%; 80–90%; Brown: 20–30%; 30–40%; 40–50%; Beshear: 20–30%; 30–40%; 40–50%; 50–60%; Stumbo: 30–40%; 40–50%; 50–60%; 60–70%; 70–80%; 80–90%; Carroll: 30–40%; 40–50%

Democratic primary results
Party	Candidate	Votes	%
Democratic	Wallace Wilkinson	221,138	34.90
Democratic	John Y. Brown Jr.	163,204	25.75
Democratic	Steve Beshear	114,439	18.06
Democratic	W. Grady Stumbo	84,613	13.35
Democratic	Julian Carroll	42,137	6.65
Democratic	Stanley Luttrell	3,788	0.60
Democratic	Dinwiddle Lampton Jr.	2,638	0.42
Total votes		633,718	100.00

=== Republican primary ===
==== Candidates ====
- John Harper, State Representative
- Joseph E. Johnson III
- Leonard "Buck" Beasley
- Thurman Jerome Hamlin

==== Results ====
Republican primary results
Party	Candidate	Votes	%
Republican	John Harper	37,432	41.42
Republican	Joseph E. Johnson III	22,396	24.78
Republican	Leonard "Buck" Beasley	21,067	23.31
Republican	Thurman Jerome Hamlin	9,475	10.49
Total votes		90,370	100.00

== General election ==
=== Candidates ===
- Wallace Wilkinson, Democratic
- John Harper, Republican

=== Results ===
1987 Kentucky gubernatorial election
Party	Candidate	Votes	%	±%
Democratic	Wallace G. Wilkinson	504,674	64.50	+10.00
Republican	John Harper	273,141	34.91	−9.20
Write-in		4,639	0.59	N/A
Total votes		782,454	100.0	N/A
Turnout		821,062	42.08	−14.15
Registered electors		1,951,243		
Democratic hold				
