= Richard Chin (politician) =

American politician

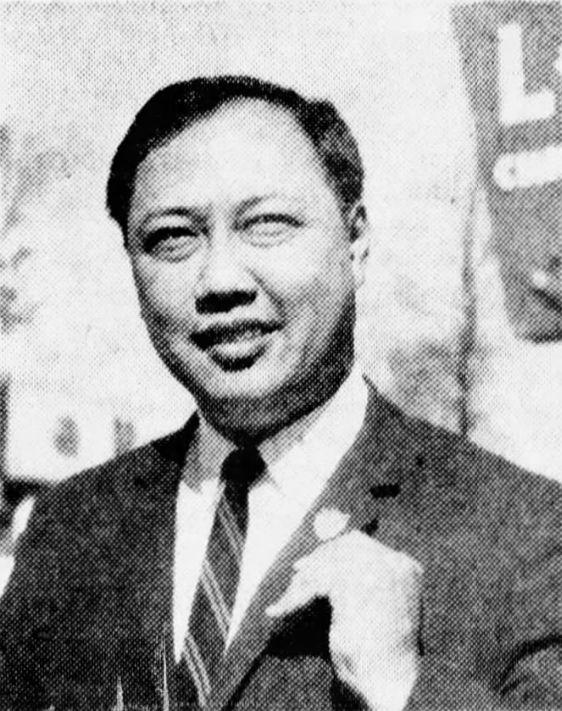
- Chin in 1965

Member of the Kentucky Senate from the 7th district
- In office November 1965 – January 1, 1972
- Preceded by: Robert P. Layne
- Succeeded by: Bill Quinlan

Personal details
- Born: 1932
- Died: December 17, 2017 (aged 85)
- Party: Republican

Richard Chin (1932 – December 17, 2017) was an American politician from Kentucky who was a member of the Kentucky Senate from 1965 to 1972. Elected in a November 1965 special election, Chin was the first Asian American member of the Kentucky General Assembly. He won reelection to a full term in 1967 but was defeated in 1971 by Democrat Bill Quinlan.

Richard Chin was the son of Ming Chin, a Chinese American immigrant and owner of the first Chinese restaurant in Louisville. After his defeat, Richard worked in the office of the Jefferson County Property Value Administrator. Chin died in December 2017 at 85 years old.
