= Bill Quinlan (politician) =

American politician

Member of the Kentucky Senate from the 7th district
- In office January 1, 1972 – January 1, 1993
- Preceded by: Richard Chin
- Succeeded by: Lindy Casebier

Personal details
- Born: December 25, 1930
- Died: March 10, 2000 (aged 69)
- Party: Democratic

William L. Quinlan (December 25, 1930 – March 10, 2000) was an American politician from Kentucky who was a member of the Kentucky Senate from 1972 to 1993. Quinlan was first elected in 1971, defeating incumbent Republican Richard Chin. He did not seek reelection in 1992.

On June 15, 1972, Quinlan was one of 20 Democratic senators that voted for Kentucky to ratify the Equal Rights Amendment.

Quinlan died in March 2000 at 69 years old.
