= 2003 Kentucky elections =

A general election was held in the U.S. state of Kentucky on November 4, 2003. The primary election for all offices was held on May 20, 2003.

== Secretary of State ==
2003 Kentucky Secretary of State election
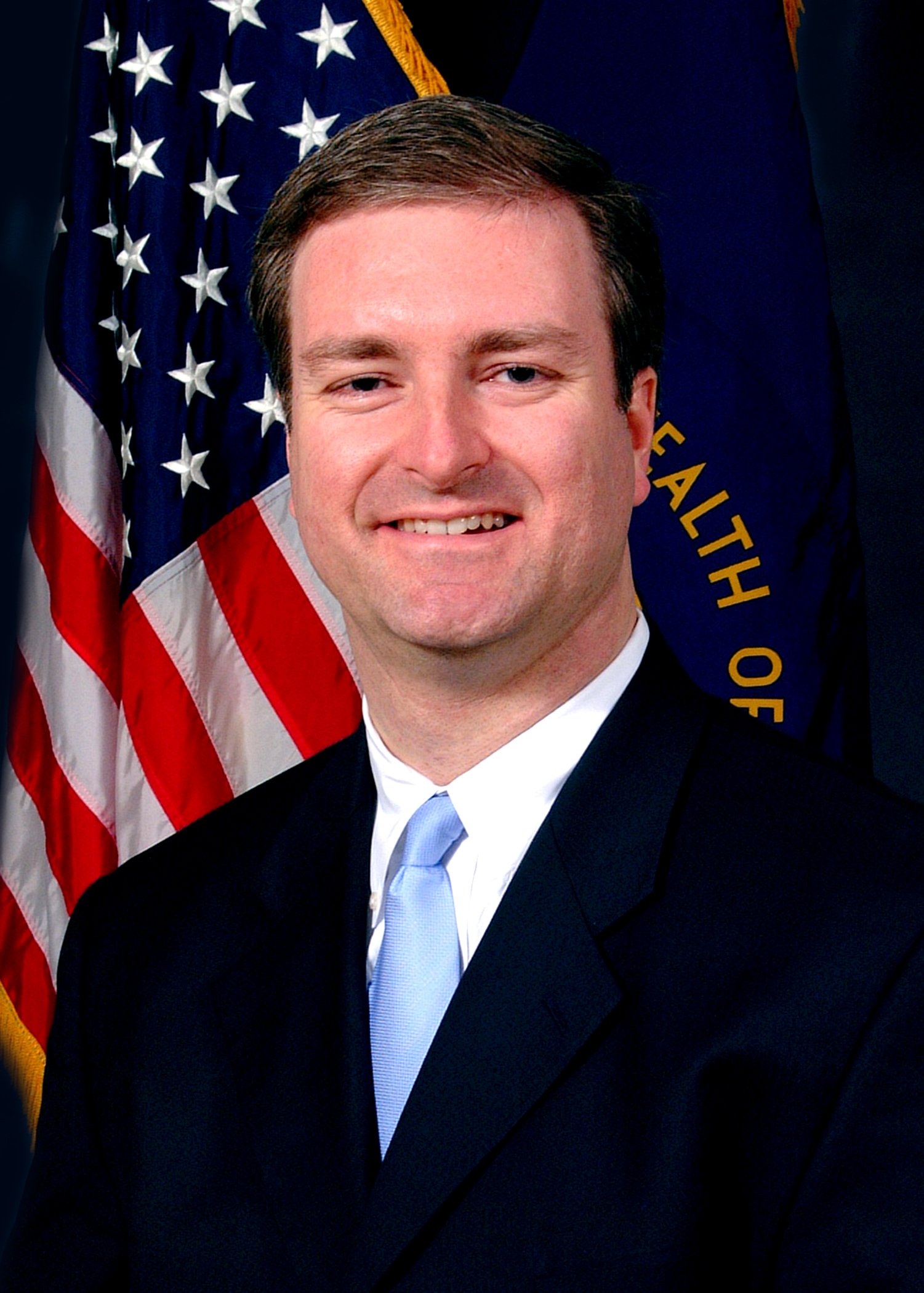

Nominee	Trey Grayson	Russ Maple
Party	Republican	Democratic
Popular vote	528,801	477,628
Percentage	52.5%	47.5%
- County results Grayson: 50–60% 60–70% 70–80% 80-90% Maple: 50–60% 60–70% 70–80% 80–90%
Secretary of State before election
John Young Brown III
Democratic
Elected Secretary of State
Trey Grayson
Republican

=== Democratic primary ===
==== Candidates ====
===== Nominee =====
- Russ Maple, Jefferson County Commissioner (1995–2003)

===== Eliminated in primary =====
- Gippy Graham, state representative from the 57th district (1995–2003)
- Joe Lanter

==== Results ====
Democratic primary results
Party	Candidate	Votes	%
Democratic	Russ Maple	105,204	43.1
Democratic	H. "Gippy" Graham	96,556	39.6
Democratic	J. "Joe B." Lanter	42,142	17.3
Total votes		243,902	100.0

=== Republican primary ===
==== Candidates ====
===== Nominee =====
- Trey Grayson

=== General election ===
==== Results ====
2003 Kentucky Secretary of State election
Party	Candidate	Votes	%
Republican	C. M. "Trey" Grayson	528,801	52.5
Democratic	Russ Maple	477,628	47.5
Total votes		1,006,429	100.0
Republican gain from Democratic			

== Attorney General ==
2003 Kentucky Attorney General election
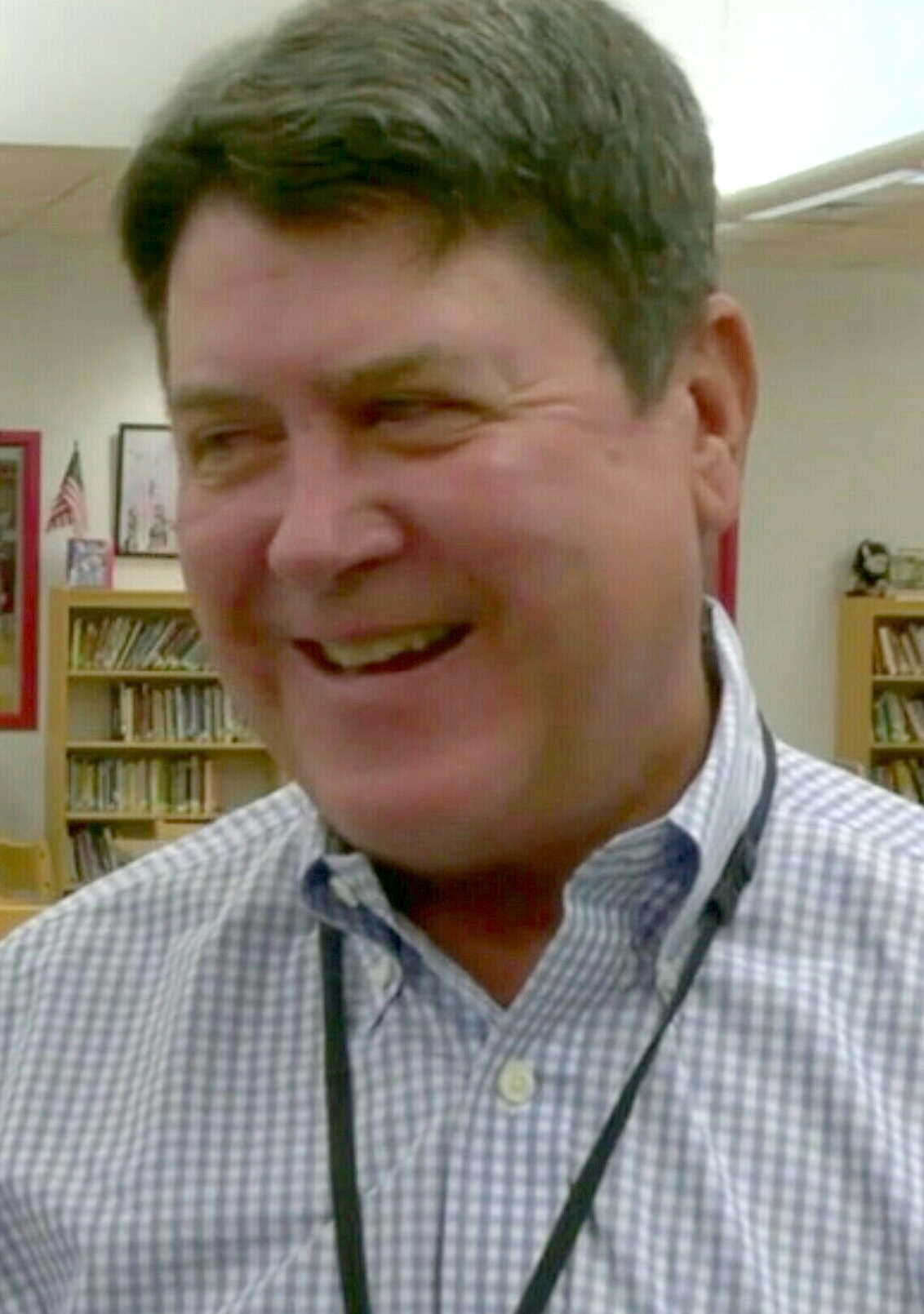

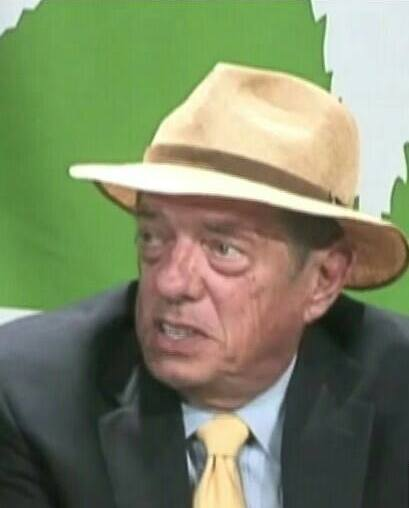
Nominee	Greg Stumbo	Jack Wood	Gatewood Galbraith
Party	Democratic	Republican	Independent
Popular vote	492,540	430,153	109,498
Percentage	47.7%	41.7%	10.6%
- County results Stumbo: 30–40% 40–50% 50–60% 60–70% 70–80% 80–90% Wood: 40-50% 50–60% 60–70% 70–80%
Attorney General before election
Ben Chandler
Democratic
Elected Attorney General
Greg Stumbo
Democratic

=== Democratic primary ===
==== Candidates ====
===== Nominee =====
- Greg Stumbo, state representative from the 95th district (1980–2004)

===== Eliminated in primary =====
- Chris Gorman, Attorney General of Kentucky (1992–1996)
- Ed Hatchett, Kentucky Auditor of Public Accounts (1996–2004)

==== Results ====
Democratic primary results
Party	Candidate	Votes	%
Democratic	Gregory D. Stumbo	99,676	36.4
Democratic	Ed Hatchett	93,381	34.1
Democratic	Chris Gorman	80,422	29.4
Total votes		273,479	100.0

=== Republican primary ===
==== Candidates ====
===== Nominee =====
- Jack Wood, judge of the 29th Kentucky District Court (1982–1986), candidate for the 30th district court in 1998, and Democratic candidate for the Louisville Metro Council in 2002

===== Eliminated in primary =====
- Tim Feeley, state representative from the 59th district (1999–2005)
- Philip Kimball, candidate for the Kentucky Senate in 2000 and the Kentucky House of Representatives in 2002

==== Results ====
Republican primary results
Party	Candidate	Votes	%
Republican	Jack D. Wood	47,320	38.7
Republican	Philip C. Kimball	37,817	30.9
Republican	Timothy E. Feeley	37,104	30.4
Total votes		122,241	100.0

=== Independent candidates ===
- Gatewood Galbraith, perennial candidate

=== General election ===
==== Results ====
2003 Kentucky Attorney General election
Party	Candidate	Votes	%
Democratic	Gregory D. Stumbo	492,540	47.7
Republican	Jack D. Wood	430,153	41.7
Independent	Gatewood Galbraith	109,498	10.6
Total votes		1,032,191	100.0
Democratic hold			

== Auditor of Public Accounts ==
2003 Kentucky Auditor of Public Accounts election
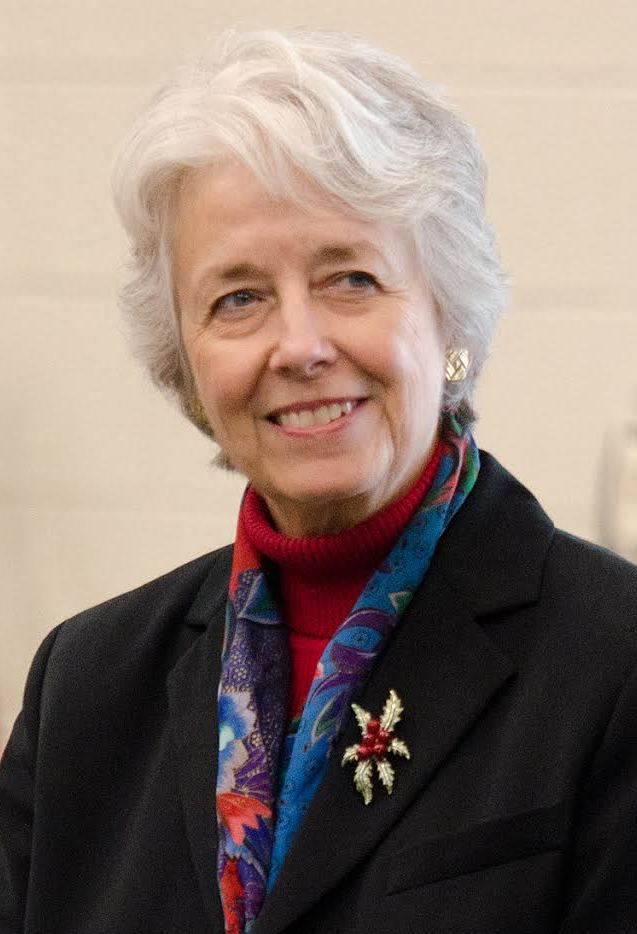

Nominee	Crit Luallen	Linda Greenwell
Party	Democratic	Republican
Popular vote	513,454	498,084
Percentage	50.8%	49.2%
- County results Luallen: 50–60% 60–70% 70–80% 80–90% Greenwell: 50–60% 60–70% 70–80% 80-90%
Auditor of Public Accounts before election
Ed Hatchett
Democratic
Elected Auditor of Public Accounts
Crit Luallen
Democratic

=== Democratic primary ===
==== Candidates ====
===== Nominee =====
- Crit Luallen

===== Eliminated in primary =====
- Michael Wayne Gayhart
- Jim Glenn

==== Results ====
Democratic primary results
Party	Candidate	Votes	%
Democratic	Crit Luallen	104,756	43.8
Democratic	Michael Wayne Gayhart	68,360	28.6
Democratic	Jim Glenn	66,040	27.6
Total votes		239,156	100.0

=== Republican primary ===
==== Candidates ====
===== Nominee =====
- Linda Greenwell, candidate for Spencer County magistrate in 1998 and County Clerk in 2002

===== Eliminated in primary =====
- Peppy Martin, Republican nominee for governor of Kentucky in 1999
- Osi Onyekwuluje
- Basha Cannon Roberts

==== Results ====
Republican primary results
Party	Candidate	Votes	%
Republican	Linda Greenwell	50,366	40.4
Republican	Peppy Martin	32,421	26.0
Republican	Basha Cannon Roberts	25,216	20.2
Republican	Osi Onyekwuluje	16,596	13.3
Total votes		124,599	100.0

=== General election ===
==== Results ====
2003 Kentucky Auditor of Public Accounts election
Party	Candidate	Votes	%
Democratic	Crit Luallen	513,454	50.8
Republican	Linda Greenwell	498,084	49.2
Total votes		1,011,538	100.0
Democratic hold			

== State Treasurer ==
2003 Kentucky State Treasurer election
Nominee	Jonathan Miller	Adam Koenig
Party	Democratic	Republican
Popular vote	569,028	437,101
Percentage	56.6%	43.4%
- County results Miller: 50–60% 60–70% 70–80% 80–90% Koenig: 50–60% 60–70% 70–80%
State Treasurer before election
Jonathan Miller
Democratic
Elected State Treasurer
Jonathan Miller
Democratic

=== Democratic primary ===
==== Candidates ====
===== Nominee =====
- Jonathan Miller, incumbent state treasurer

=== Republican primary ===
==== Candidates ====
===== Nominee =====
- Adam Koenig, Kenton County Commissioner (1999–2007)

=== General election ===
==== Results ====
2003 Kentucky State Treasurer election
Party	Candidate	Votes	%
Democratic	Jonathan Miller (incumbent)	569,028	56.6
Republican	Adam Koenig	437,101	43.4
Total votes		1,006,129	100.0
Democratic hold			

== Commissioner of Agriculture ==
2003 Kentucky Commissioner of Agriculture election
Nominee	Richie Farmer	Alice Woods Baesler
Party	Republican	Democratic
Popular vote	578,008	468,696
Percentage	55.2%	44.8%
- County results Farmer: 50–60% 60–70% 70–80% Baesler: 50–60% 60–70% 70–80%
Commissioner of Agriculture before election
Billy Ray Smith
Democratic
Elected Commissioner of Agriculture
Richie Farmer
Republican

=== Democratic primary ===
==== Candidates ====
===== Nominee =====
- Alice Woods Baesler

===== Eliminated in primary =====
- T. E. Beckham
- Glen D. Holbrook, candidate for Commissioner of Agriculture in 1991 and 1995
- Barney Hornback
- Roy A. Massey
- Steve Meredith, candidate for the Kentucky House of Representatives in 1992
- Joey Pendleton, state senator from the 3rd district (1993–2013)
- Jimmy Turner, Member of the Kentucky Railroad Commission (1976–1988) and candidate for the Kentucky Senate in 1988

==== Results ====
Democratic primary results
Party	Candidate	Votes	%
Democratic	Alice Woods Baesler	57,110	22.4
Democratic	Joey Pendleton	47,713	18.7
Democratic	Barney Hornback	43,087	16.9
Democratic	Roy A. Massey	28,240	11.1
Democratic	Steve Meredith	26,417	10.4
Democratic	Glen D. Holbrook	25,023	9.8
Democratic	Jimmy "Gabe" Turner	14,939	5.9
Democratic	T. E. "Beck" Beckham	12,439	4.9
Total votes		254,968	100.0

=== Republican primary ===
==== Candidates ====
===== Nominee =====
- Richie Farmer

===== Eliminated in primary =====
- Leonard Beasley, candidate for governor of Kentucky in 1987 and Commissioner of Agriculture in 1991

==== Results ====
Republican primary results
Party	Candidate	Votes	%
Republican	Richie Farmer	109,831	79.1
Republican	L. W. "Buck" Beasley	28,948	20.9
Total votes		138,779	100.0

=== General election ===
==== Results ====
2003 Kentucky Commissioner of Agriculture election
Party	Candidate	Votes	%
Republican	Richie Farmer	578,008	55.2
Democratic	Alice Woods Baesler	468,696	44.8
Total votes		1,046,704	100.0
Republican gain from Democratic			

== See also ==
- Elections in Kentucky
- Politics of Kentucky
- Political party strength in Kentucky
