= 1999 Kentucky elections =

A general election was held in the U.S. state of Kentucky on November 2, 1999. The primary election for all offices was held on May 25, 1999.

== Secretary of State ==
1999 Kentucky Secretary of State election
Nominee	John Young Brown III
Party	Democratic
Popular vote	396,784
Percentage	100.0%
Secretary of State before election
John Young Brown III
Democratic
Elected Secretary of State
John Young Brown III
Democratic

=== Democratic primary ===
==== Nominee ====
- John Young Brown III, incumbent secretary of state

=== General election ===
==== Results ====
1999 Kentucky Secretary of State election
Party	Candidate	Votes	%
Democratic	John Y. Brown III (incumbent)	Unopposed	
Total votes		396,784	100.0
Democratic hold			

== Attorney General ==
1999 Kentucky Attorney General election
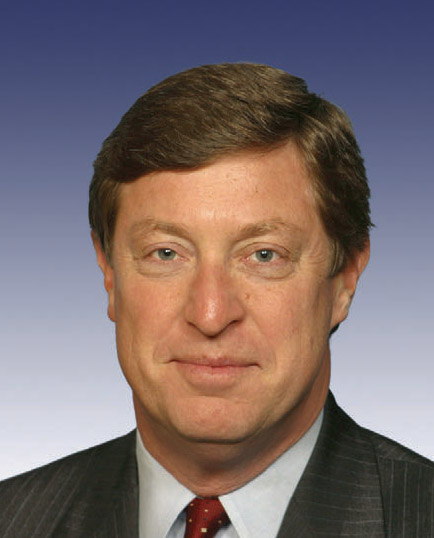
Nominee	Ben Chandler
Party	Democratic
Popular vote	403,223
Percentage	100.0%
Attorney General before election
Ben Chandler
Democratic
Elected Attorney General
Ben Chandler
Democratic

=== Democratic primary ===
==== Nominee ====
- Ben Chandler, incumbent attorney general

=== General election ===
==== Results ====
1999 Kentucky Attorney General election
Party	Candidate	Votes	%
Democratic	A. B. "Ben" Chandler (incumbent)	Unopposed	
Total votes		403,223	100.0
Democratic hold			

== Auditor of Public Accounts ==
1999 Kentucky Auditor of Public Accounts election
Nominee	Ed Hatchett
Party	Democratic
Popular vote	368,429
Percentage	100.0%
Auditor of Public Accounts before election
Ed Hatchett
Democratic
Elected Auditor of Public Accounts
Ed Hatchett
Democratic

=== Democratic primary ===
==== Nominee ====
- Ed Hatchett, incumbent auditor of public accounts

=== General election ===
==== Results ====
1999 Kentucky Auditor of Public Accounts election
Party	Candidate	Votes	%
Democratic	Ed Hatchett (incumbent)	Unopposed	
Total votes		368,429	100.0
Democratic hold			

== State Treasurer ==
1999 Kentucky State Treasurer election
Nominee	Jonathan Miller
Party	Democratic
Popular vote	372,953
Percentage	100.0%
State Treasurer before election
John Kennedy Hamilton
Democratic
Elected State Treasurer
Jonathan Miller
Democratic

=== Democratic primary ===
==== Nominee ====
- Jonathan Miller, deputy chief of staff of the Department of Energy (1996–1997) and candidate for Kentucky's 6th congressional district in 1998

==== Eliminated in primary ====
- Susan Johns, state representative from the 32nd district (1997–2001) and state senator from the 36th district district (1991–1995)

==== Results ====
Democratic primary results
Party	Candidate	Votes	%
Democratic	Jonathan Miller	66,586	55.9
Democratic	Susan D. Johns	52,537	44.1
Total votes		119,123	100.0

=== General election ===
==== Results ====
1999 Kentucky State Treasurer election
Party	Candidate	Votes	%
Democratic	Jonathan Miller	Unopposed	
Total votes		372,953	100.0
Democratic hold			

== Commissioner of Agriculture ==
1999 Kentucky Commissioner of Agriculture election
Nominee	Billy Ray Smith
Party	Democratic
Popular vote	375,769
Percentage	100.0%
Commissioner of Agriculture before election
Billy Ray Smith
Democratic
Elected Commissioner of Agriculture
Billy Ray Smith
Democratic

=== Democratic primary ===
==== Nominee ====
- Billy Ray Smith, incumbent commissioner of agriculture

=== General election ===
==== Results ====
1999 Kentucky Commissioner of Agriculture election
Party	Candidate	Votes	%
Democratic	Billy Ray Smith (incumbent)	Unopposed	
Total votes		375,769	100.0
Democratic hold			

== Railroad Commission ==
Results by county: Democratic candidates: 50–60%; 60–70%; 70–80%; 80–90%; 100%; Republican candidates: 50–60%; 60–70%

The three members of the Kentucky Railroad Commission were elected to four-year terms. This was the final election before the commission was abolished in 2000.

== Kentucky Supreme Court ==
1999 Kentucky Supreme Court 5th district special election
- November 2, 1999
- District 5
Candidate	James E. Keller	Phillip J. Shepherd
Popular vote	47,611	37,779
Percentage	55.76%	44.24%
- County results Keller: 50–60% 60–70% Shepherd: 50–60% 60–70%
Justice before election
James E. Keller
Elected Justice
James E. Keller

The Kentucky Supreme Court consists of seven justices elected in non-partisan elections to staggered eight-year terms. A special election was held in district 5 in 1999.

=== District 5 ===
1999 Kentucky Supreme Court 5th district special election
Candidate	Votes	%
James E. Keller (incumbent)	47,611	55.76
Phillip J. Shepherd	37,779	44.24
Total votes	85,390	100.0

== Other judicial elections ==
Judges of the Kentucky Court of Appeals and the Kentucky Circuit Courts are elected in non-partisan elections to eight-year terms. In 1999, judges were elected to seven-year terms in order to move the elections from odd to even-numbered years.

== See also ==
- Elections in Kentucky
- Politics of Kentucky
- Political party strength in Kentucky
