= 1995 Kentucky elections =

- November 7, 1995
- Turnout: 44.50%

A general election was held in the U.S. state of Kentucky on November 7, 1995. The primary election for all offices was held on May 23, 1995.

== Voter turnout ==
=== Primary election ===
Turnout in the primary election was 21.31%, with 464,251 votes cast.

Party	Votes cast	Registration	Turnout
Democratic	344,149	1,403,966	24.51%
Republican	119,892	663,756	18.06%
Other	210	110,629	0.19%
Total	464,251	2,178,351	21.31%

=== General election ===
Turnout in the general election was 44.50%, with 1,000,206 votes cast.

Party	Votes cast	Registration	Turnout
Democratic	662,659	1,424,592	46.52%
Republican	306,184	690,966	44.31%
Other	31,363	132,223	23.72%
Total	1,000,206	2,247,781	44.50%

== Secretary of State ==
1995 Kentucky Secretary of State election
Nominee	John Y. Brown III	Steve Crabtree
Party	Democratic	Republican
Popular vote	528,547	395,841
Percentage	57.18%	42.82%
- County results Brown: 50–60% 60–70% 70–80% 80–90% Crabtree: 50–60% 60–70% 70–80%
Secretary of State before election
Bob Babbage
Democratic
Elected Secretary of State
John Y. Brown III
Democratic

=== Democratic primary ===
==== Nominee ====
- John Y. Brown III, attorney

==== Eliminated in primary ====
- Don Blevins, County Clerk of Fayette County (1982–2008) and member of the Lexington-Fayette Urban County Council (1974–1982)
- Ed Logsdon, Kentucky Commissioner of Agriculture (1992–1996)
- Frances Jones Mills, Kentucky State Treasurer (1976–1980, 1984–1988, 1992–1996) and Kentucky Secretary of State (1980–1984)
- Carol Palmore, Kentucky Labor Secretary (1987–1994)
- George W. Wilson, Kentucky Corrections Secretary (1980–1987)

==== Results ====
Democratic primary results
Party	Candidate	Votes	%
Democratic	John Y. Brown III	106,064	34.65
Democratic	Ed Logsdon	56,350	18.41
Democratic	Carol Palmore	45,157	14.75
Democratic	Frances Jones Mills	41,487	13.55
Democratic	Don Blevins	31,674	10.35
Democratic	George W. Wilson	25,373	8.29
Total votes		306,105	100.0

=== Republican primary ===
==== Nominee ====
- Steve Crabtree, television executive

==== Eliminated in primary ====
- Charles Merle Hellebusch, businessman and chair of the Ross Perot 1992 presidential campaign in Kentucky

==== Results ====
Republican primary results
Party	Candidate	Votes	%
Republican	Steve Crabtree	70,091	76.74
Republican	Charles Merle Hellebusch	21,243	23.26
Total votes		91,334	100.0

=== General election ===
==== Results ====
1995 Kentucky Secretary of State election
Party	Candidate	Votes	%
Democratic	John Y. Brown III	528,547	57.18
Republican	Steve Crabtree	395,841	42.82
Total votes		924,388	100.0
Democratic hold			

== Attorney General ==
1995 Kentucky Attorney General election
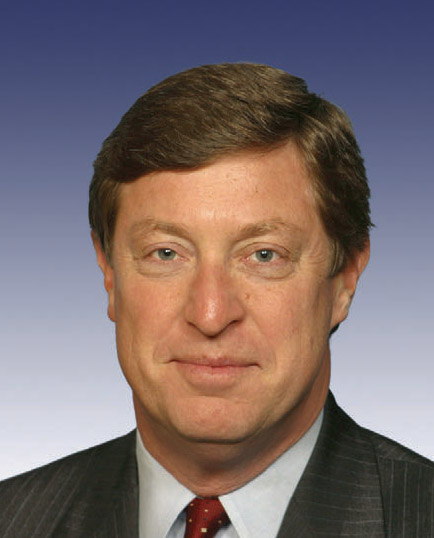

Nominee	Ben Chandler	Will T. Scott
Party	Democratic	Republican
Popular vote	560,526	375,287
Percentage	59.90%	40.10%
- County results Chandler: 50–60% 60–70% 70–80% 80–90% Scott: 50–60% 60–70% 70–80%
Attorney General before election
Chris Gorman
Democratic
Elected Attorney General
Ben Chandler
Democratic

=== Democratic primary ===
==== Nominee ====
- Ben Chandler

=== Republican primary ===
==== Nominee ====
- Will T. Scott

==== Eliminated in primary ====
- Eurie Hayes Smith III

==== Results ====
Republican primary results
Party	Candidate	Votes	%
Republican	William "Will T." Scott	69,884	78.19
Republican	Eurie Hayes Smith III	19,497	21.81
Total votes		89,381	100.0

=== General election ===
==== Results ====
1995 Kentucky Attorney General election
Party	Candidate	Votes	%
Democratic	A. B. "Ben" Chandler	560,526	59.90
Republican	William "Will T." Scott	375,287	40.10
Total votes		935,813	100.0
Democratic hold			

== Auditor of Public Accounts ==
1995 Kentucky Auditor of Public Accounts election
Nominee	Ed Hatchett	Don Bell
Party	Democratic	Republican
Popular vote	490,079	396,060
Percentage	55.30%	44.70%
- County results Hatchett: 50–60% 60–70% 70–80% 80–90% Bell: 50–60% 60–70% 70–80%
Auditor of Public Accounts before election
Ben Chandler
Democratic
Elected Auditor of Public Accounts
Ed Hatchett
Democratic

=== Democratic primary ===
==== Nominee ====
- Ed Hatchett

==== Eliminated in primary ====
- Jesse S. Hall
- Jim Wayne

==== Results ====
Democratic primary results
Party	Candidate	Votes	%
Democratic	Ed Hatchett	114,369	45.40
Democratic	Jim Wayne	81,478	32.34
Democratic	Jesse S. Hall	56,059	22.25
Total votes		251,906	100.0

=== Republican primary ===
==== Nominee ====
- Don Ball

==== Eliminated in primary ====
- Tom Buford

==== Results ====
Republican primary results
Party	Candidate	Votes	%
Republican	Don Ball	44,407	51.28
Republican	Tom Buford	42,196	48.72
Total votes		86,603	100.0

=== General election ===
==== Results ====
1995 Kentucky Auditor of Public Accounts election
Party	Candidate	Votes	%
Democratic	Ed Hatchett	490,079	55.30
Republican	Don Bell	396,060	44.70
Total votes		886,139	100.0
Democratic hold			

== State Treasurer ==
1995 Kentucky State Treasurer election
Nominee	John Kennedy Hamilton	James H. Lambert
Party	Democratic	Republican
Popular vote	494,801	409,362
Percentage	54.72%	45.28%
- County results Hamilton: 50–60% 60–70% 70–80% 80–90% Lambert: 50–60% 60–70% 70–80%
State Treasurer before election
Frances Jones Mills
Democratic
Elected State Treasurer
John Kennedy Hamilton
Democratic

=== Democratic primary ===
==== Nominee ====
- John Kennedy Hamilton

==== Eliminated in primary ====
- Larry J. O'Bryan
- Pamela Carroll
- Jim V. Marcum
- Barbara Mahaffey Nash

==== Results ====
Democratic primary results
Party	Candidate	Votes	%
Democratic	John Kennedy Hamilton	81,691	29.80
Democratic	Pamela Carroll	81,009	29.55
Democratic	Larry J. O'Bryan	56,657	20.67
Democratic	Barbara Mahaffey Nash	32,346	11.80
Democratic	James "Jim" V. Marcum	22,396	8.17
Total votes		274,099	100.0

=== Republican primary ===
==== Nominee ====
- James H. Lambert

==== Eliminated in primary ====
- John Glascock

==== Results ====
Republican primary results
Party	Candidate	Votes	%
Republican	James H. Lambert	52,431	56.15
Republican	John Glascock	40,950	43.85
Total votes		93,381	100.0

=== General election ===
==== Results ====
1995 Kentucky State Treasurer election
Party	Candidate	Votes	%
Democratic	John Kennedy Hamilton	494,801	54.72
Republican	James H. Lambert	409,362	45.28
Total votes		904,163	100.0
Democratic hold			

== Commissioner of Agriculture ==
1995 Kentucky Commissioner of Agriculture election
Nominee	Billy Ray Smith	Woody Allen
Party	Democratic	Republican
Popular vote	515,524	384,928
Percentage	57.25%	42.75%
- County results Smith: 50–60% 60–70% 70–80% 80–90% Allen: 50–60% 60–70% 70–80%
Commissioner of Agriculture before election
Ed Logsdon
Democratic
Elected Commissioner of Agriculture
Billy Ray Smith
Democratic

=== Democratic primary ===
==== Nominee ====
- Billy Ray Smith

==== Eliminated in primary ====
- Glen Holbrook

==== Results ====
Democratic primary results
Party	Candidate	Votes	%
Democratic	Billy Ray Smith	138,226	54.54
Democratic	Glen Holbrook	115,208	45.46
Total votes		253,434	100.0

=== Republican primary ===
==== Nominee ====
- Woody Allen

=== General election ===
==== Results ====
1995 Kentucky Commissioner of Agriculture election
Party	Candidate	Votes	%
Democratic	Billy Ray Smith	515,524	57.25
Republican	Woody Allen	384,928	42.75
Total votes		900,452	100.0
Democratic hold			

== Railroad Commission ==
Results by county: Democratic candidates: 50–60%; 60–70%; 70–80%; 80–90%; 100%; Republican candidates: 50–60%; 60–70%; 70–80%

The three members of the Kentucky Railroad Commission were elected to four-year terms.

== Kentucky Supreme Court ==
1995 Kentucky Supreme Court 1st district special election
- November 7, 1995
- District 1
Candidate	William Graves	Will Shadoan	Rick Johnson
Popular vote	17,334	16,345	16,192
Percentage	20.18%	19.03%	18.85%
Candidate	Charles Boteler	Richard Lewis	Christopher Hancock
Popular vote	16,000	14,603	5,433
Percentage	18.62%	17.00%	6.32%
Justice before election
William Fuqua
Elected Justice
William Graves

The Kentucky Supreme Court consists of seven justices elected in non-partisan elections to staggered eight-year terms. A special election was held in district 1 in 1995.

=== District 1 ===
1995 Kentucky Supreme Court 1st district special election
Candidate	Votes	%
J. W. "Bill" Graves	17,334	20.18
Will Shadoan	16,345	19.03
Rick Johnson	16,192	18.85
Charles Boteler	16,000	18.62
Richard Lewis	14,603	17.00
Christopher "Kit" Hancock	5,433	6.32
Total votes	85,907	100.0

== Local offices ==
=== Mayors ===
Mayors in Kentucky are elected to four-year terms, with cities currently holding their elections in either presidential or midterm years. In 1995, cities which held elections elected their mayor to a five-year term in order to move future elections to presidential years.

== See also ==
- Elections in Kentucky
- Politics of Kentucky
- Political party strength in Kentucky
