= 2014 United States Senate election in Kentucky =

- November 4, 2014
- Turnout: 46.27%

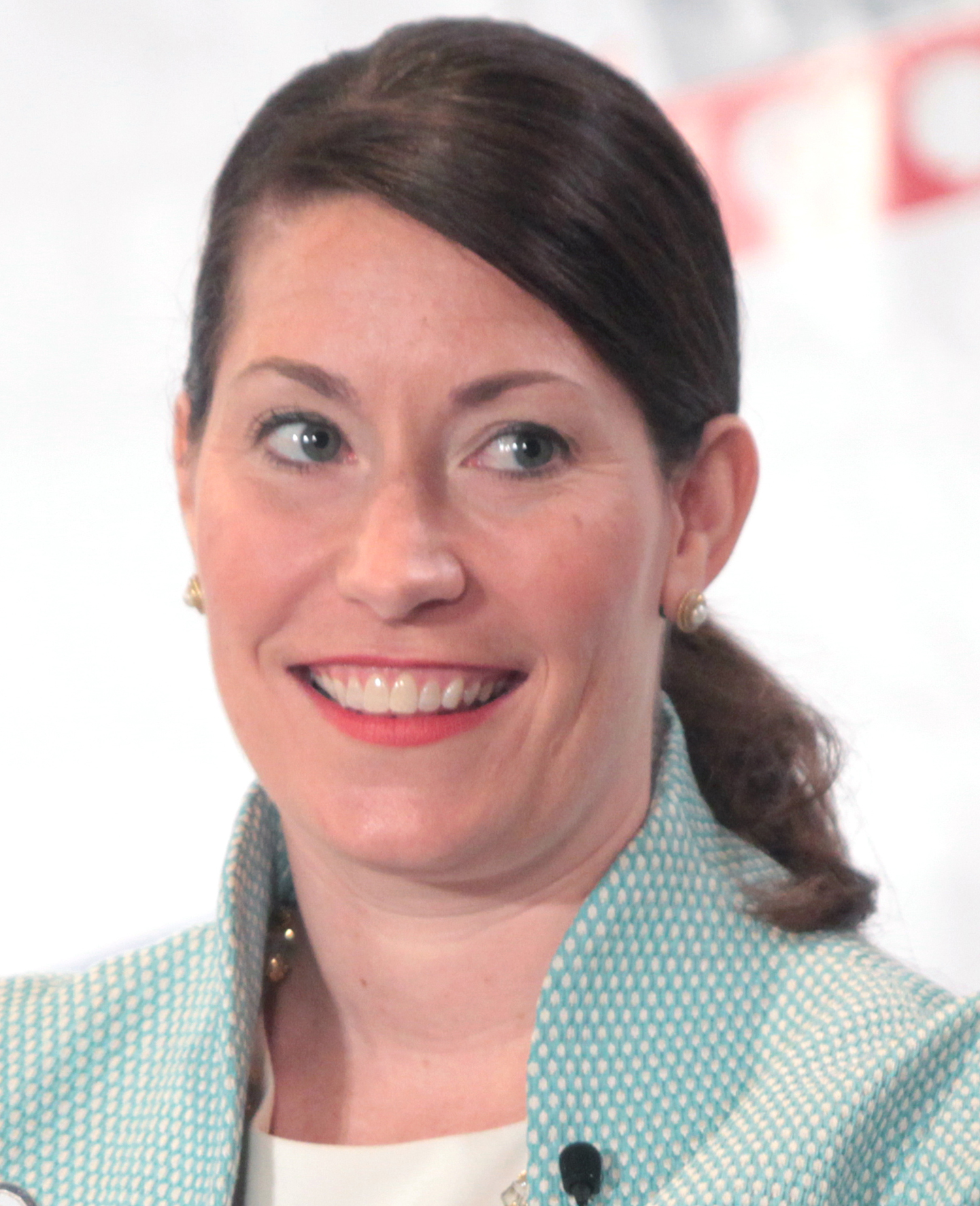
Nominee	Mitch McConnell	Alison Lundergan Grimes
Party	Republican	Democratic
Popular vote	806,787	584,698
Percentage	56.19%	40.72%
- McConnell: 40–50% 50–60% 60–70% 70–80% 80–90% Grimes: 40–50% 50–60% 60–70% 70–80% 80–90%
U.S. senator before election
Mitch McConnell
Republican
Elected U.S. Senator
Mitch McConnell
Republican

The 2014 United States Senate election in Kentucky took place on November 4, 2014, to elect a member of the United States Senate to represent the Commonwealth of Kentucky, concurrently with elections to the United States Senate in other states, elections to the United States House of Representatives, and various state and local elections.

Incumbent Republican Senator Mitch McConnell, the Senate Minority Leader, ran for re-election to a sixth term. He faced Democratic nominee and Kentucky Secretary of State Alison Lundergan Grimes and Libertarian nominee David Patterson in the general election.

The race was initially seen as a possible pickup opportunity for Democrats, largely due to McConnell's unpopularity among Kentucky voters. By election day, however, both The Cook Political Report and the Rothenberg Political Report considered Republicans to be favored. McConnell ultimately defeated Grimes by a landslide margin of 56.2% to 40.7%.

== Republican primary ==
Immediately after a secret recording of Mitch McConnell and his campaign staff was released to Mother Jones, McConnell expressed concerns about what he saw as a threat from the left. David Adams, a Kentucky Tea Party activist who was seeking a Republican opponent to McConnell, told The New York Times that McConnell's fears about "threats from the left" were misplaced. Adams said: "It's going to come from the right. The fact that he's coming unglued about this thing should make clear to observers that he may not be ready for the challenge that lies ahead."

McConnell won the primary with 60.2% of the vote. According to analysis by the University of Minnesota, this is the lowest voter support for a Kentucky U.S. senator in a primary by either party since 1938.

=== Candidates ===
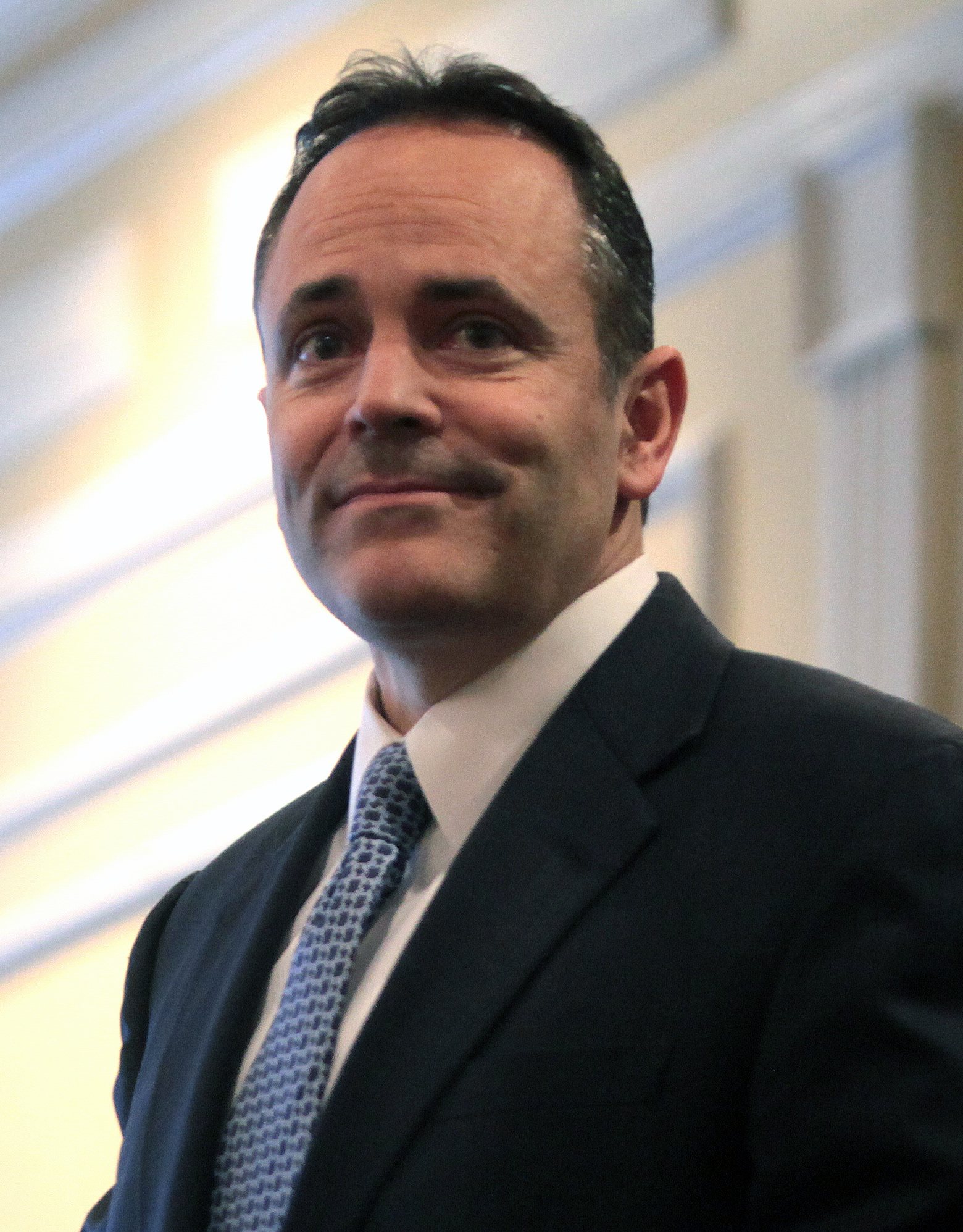
Candidate Matt Bevin

==== Declared ====
- Matt Bevin, businessman
- Brad Copas, former National Guardsman
- Mitch McConnell, incumbent U.S. senator
- Chris Payne, party promoter
- Shawna Sterling, doctoral student

==== Withdrew ====
- Gurley L. Martin, World War II veteran and candidate for the U.S. Senate in 2010

==== Declined ====
- Andy Barr, U.S. representative
- Ernie Fletcher, former governor of Kentucky and former U.S. representative
- Brett Guthrie, U.S. representative
- John Kemper, candidate for state auditor in 2011
- Thomas Massie, U.S. representative

=== Endorsements ===
Matt Bevin

Public figures

- Wendy Caswell, founder and president of the Louisville Tea Party
- Mandy Connell, conservative talk radio personality
- Tom Dupree, WLAP Radio host
- Larry Forgy, former Republican national committeeman and 1995 Republican nominee for Governor of Kentucky
- John Kemper, former Republican nominee for Kentucky state auditor and conservative activist
- Mark Levin, conservative talk radio host
- Angela Minter, executive director of Sisters for Life

Organizations

- FreedomWorks
- Gun Owners of America
- Louisville Tea Party
- Madison Project PAC
- Northern Kentucky Right to Life
- Republican Liberty Caucus
- Right Wing News
- Senate Conservatives Fund
- Take Back Kentucky
- Tea Party Patriots
- United Kentucky Tea Party
Mitch McConnell

Elected officials

- James Comer, Kentucky commissioner of agriculture
- Mike Huckabee, former governor of Arkansas and candidate for president of the United States in 2008
- Anne Northup, former U.S. representative (R-KY)
- Rand Paul, U.S. senator (R-KY)
- Rick Perry, governor of Texas and 2012 presidential candidate
- Pat Toomey, U.S. senator (R-PA)

Organizations

- American Chemistry Council
- NRA Political Victory Fund
- TheTeaParty.net
Declined to endorse

Elected officials

- Ernie Fletcher, former governor of Kentucky and former U.S. representative

=== Polling ===
Poll source	Date(s) administered	Sample size	Margin of error	Mitch McConnell	Matt Bevin	Brad Copas	Chris Payne	Shawna Sterling	Undecided
Wenzel Strategies	July 23–24, 2013	302	± 5.6%	58.9%	19.9%	—	—	—	21.2%
Voter/Consumer Research ^	August 18–20, 2013	600	± 4%	68%	21%	—	—	—	8%
Lake Research Partners	October 24–29, 2013	603	± 4%	50%	17%	—	—	—	33%
Public Policy Polling	December 12–15, 2013	540	± 4.2%	53%	26%	—	—	—	21%
Gravis Marketing	January 2, 2014	683	± 4%	53%	31%	—	—	—	16%
Bluegrass Poll	January 30 – February 4, 2014	404	± 4.9%	55%	29%	—	—	—	15%
Wenzel Strategies	February 8–11, 2014	377	± 5.03%	58.5%	17.4%	—	—	—	24.1%
Public Opinion Strategies	February 24–26, 2014	400	± 4.9%	61%	23%	—	—	—	16%
Gravis Marketing	April 15–17, 2014	638	± 4%	51%	34%	—	—	—	15%
NBC News/Marist	April 30 – May 6, 2014	760	± 3.6%	55%	22%	1%	3%	2%	17%
Gravis Marketing	May 12, 2014	629	± 4%	48%	34%	—	—	—	18%
Bluegrass Poll	May 14–16, 2014	605	± 4%	55%	35%	1%	1%	3%	5%

- ^ Internal poll for Mitch McConnell campaign
Hypothetical polling

Poll source	Date(s) administered	Sample size	Margin of error	Mitch McConnell	Someone more conservative	Undecided
Public Policy Polling	December 7–9, 2012	395	± 4.9%	50%	35%	15%
Public Policy Polling	April 5–7, 2013	320	± 5.5%	46%	32%	22%
Public Policy Polling	December 12–15, 2013	540	± 4.2%	39%	42%	19%

Poll source	Date(s) administered	Sample size	Margin of error	Mitch McConnell	John Calipari	Undecided
Gravis Marketing	January 2, 2014	683	± 4%	59%	26%	15%

Poll source	Date(s) administered	Sample size	Margin of error	Mitch McConnell	Thomas Massie	Undecided
Public Policy Polling	December 7–9, 2012	395	± 4.9%	66%	18%	16%
Public Policy Polling	April 5–7, 2013	320	± 5.5%	56%	18%	27%

=== Results ===
Results by county McConnell: 40–50%; 50–60%; 60–70%; 70–80%; Bevin: 40–50%

Republican primary results
Party	Candidate	Votes	%
Republican	Mitch McConnell (incumbent)	213,753	60.19%
Republican	Matt Bevin	125,787	35.42%
Republican	Shawna Sterling	7,214	2.03%
Republican	Chris Payne	5,338	1.51%
Republican	Brad Copas	3,024	0.85%
Total votes		355,116	100.00%

== Democratic primary ==
In late 2012 and early 2013, media speculation focused on the possibility of a challenge to incumbent Mitch McConnell from actress and Tennessee resident Ashley Judd, who was raised in Kentucky. Judd later announced that she would not seek the Democratic nomination. On April 9, Mother Jones magazine released a tape of a private meeting between McConnell and, allegedly, his aides reviewing opposition research and tactics to use against Judd. At the February strategy session, McConnell referred to the early stages of his re-election bid as the "Whac-A-Mole period of the campaign," and he and aides discussed attacking Judd's religious views as well as her struggle with depression.

Alison Lundergan Grimes, the sitting secretary of state, entered the primary race with the encouragement of former president Bill Clinton, a friend of Grimes's father, former Kentucky politician Jerry Lundergan. On May 20, 2014, she won the Democratic primary with 77% of the vote. Her father's involvement in the campaign was noted as a factor in the race because of his personal political history and fundraising connections.

=== Candidates ===
==== Declared ====
- Burrel Farnsley, perennial candidate
- Alison Lundergan Grimes, secretary of state of Kentucky
- Greg Leichty, professor at the University of Louisville
- Tom Recktenwald, former Catholic school teacher

==== Withdrew ====
- Ed Marksberry, contractor and nominee for Kentucky's 2nd congressional district in 2010 (ran as an independent before dropping out entirely)

==== Declined ====
- Jerry Abramson, lieutenant governor of Kentucky and former mayor of Louisville
- Matthew Barzun, United States ambassador to the United Kingdom and former United States ambassador to Sweden
- Steve Beshear, governor of Kentucky
- John Young Brown III, former secretary of state of Kentucky and candidate for lieutenant governor of Kentucky in 2007
- Ben Chandler, former U.S. representative
- Jack Conway, attorney general of Kentucky and nominee for the U.S. Senate in 2010
- Adam Edelen, state auditor of Kentucky
- Greg Fischer, mayor of Louisville
- Tom FitzGerald, executive director of the Kentucky Resources Council
- Heather French Henry, former Miss America
- Bill Garmer, attorney, former chairman of the Kentucky Democratic Party
- Gill Holland, film producer and environmental activist
- Ashley Judd, actress and political activist
- Crit Luallen, former state auditor
- Daniel Mongiardo, former lieutenant governor of Kentucky and nominee for the U.S. Senate in 2004
- Dennis Parrett, state senator
- Greg Stumbo, speaker of the Kentucky House of Representatives and former attorney general of Kentucky
- John Yarmuth, U.S. representative

=== Endorsements ===
Alison Lundergan Grimes

Elected officials

- Jerry Abramson, lieutenant governor of Kentucky and former mayor of Louisville
- Steve Beshear, governor of Kentucky
- Julian Carroll, state senator and former governor of Kentucky
- Bill Clinton, former president of the United States
- Hillary Clinton, former U.S. secretary of state
- Martha Layne Collins, former governor of Kentucky
- Jack Conway, former attorney general of Kentucky
- Greg Fischer, mayor of Louisville
- Wendell Ford, former U.S. senator and former governor of Kentucky
- Terry McAuliffe, governor of Virginia
- Paul E. Patton, former governor of Kentucky
- Jody Richards, state representative and former speaker of the Kentucky House of Representatives
- Debbie Stabenow, U.S. senator from Michigan
- Greg Stumbo, speaker of the Kentucky House of Representatives and former attorney general of Kentucky
- Elizabeth Warren, U.S. senator from Massachusetts
- John Yarmuth, U.S. representative

Newspapers

- The Courier-Journal
- The Lexington Herald-Leader

Public figures

- Madeleine Albright, former United States secretary of state and former United States ambassador to the United Nations
- James Carville, political commentator and media personality
- Heather French Henry, former Miss America
- Ashley Judd, actress and political activist
- Jeffrey Katzenberg, CEO of DreamWorks Animation
- Lilly Ledbetter, activist and namesake of the Lilly Ledbetter Fair Pay Act of 2009
- will.i.am, hip-hop artist

Organizations

- American Sunrise PAC
- Council for a Livable World
- Democratic Senatorial Campaign Committee
- EMILY's List
- Kentucky Education Association
- Kentucky Professional Firefighters Association
- Kentucky State AFL-CIO
- National Education Association
- United Mine Workers of America

=== Polling ===
Hypothetical polling

Poll source	Date(s) administered	Sample size	Margin of error	Jerry Abramson	Matthew Barzun	Jack Conway	Adam Edelen	Greg Fischer	Alison Lundergan Grimes	Ashley Judd	John Yarmuth	Other	Undecided
Public Policy Polling	December 7–9, 2012	585	± 4.1%	16%	1%	15%	2%	5%	9%	29%	9%	—	15%

=== Results ===
Results by county Grimes: 50–60%; 60–70%; 70–80%; 80–90%

Democratic primary results
Party	Candidate	Votes	%
Democratic	Alison Lundergan Grimes	307,821	76.47%
Democratic	Greg Leichty	32,602	8.10%
Democratic	Burrel Farnsley	32,310	8.03%
Democratic	Tom Recktenwald	29,791	7.40%
Total votes		402,524	100.00%

== Libertarian primary ==
=== Candidates ===
==== Declared ====
- David Patterson, police officer

=== Results ===
Patterson won the Libertarian primary on March 1, 2014. While he ran unopposed, all Libertarian Party candidates must defeat "none of the above" (NOTA) in the primary operated by the Libertarian Party of Kentucky. He became an official ballot-listed candidate on August 11 after submitting over 9,100 signatures.

== Independents ==
=== Candidates ===
==== Declared ====
- Mike Maggard (write-in)
- Robert Ransdell (write-in), white supremacist and Neo-Nazi campaigner
- Shawna Sterling (write-in), unsuccessful Republican candidate for the seat

==== Withdrew ====
- Ed Marksberry, contractor and Democratic nominee for Kentucky's 2nd congressional district in 2010

== General election ==
=== Debates ===
- Complete video of debate, October 13, 2014

=== Predictions ===
Source	Ranking	As of
The Cook Political Report	Lean R	November 3, 2014
Sabato's Crystal Ball	Likely R	November 3, 2014
Rothenberg Political Report	Likely R	November 3, 2014
Real Clear Politics	Lean R	November 3, 2014

=== Polling ===
Poll source	Date(s) administered	Sample size	Margin of error	Mitch McConnell (R)	Alison Lundergan Grimes (D)	David Patterson (L)	Other	Undecided
Public Policy Polling	December 7–9, 2012	1,266	± 2.8%	47%	40%	—	—	13%
Public Policy Polling	April 5–7, 2013	1,052	± 3%	45%	41%	—	—	14%
Public Policy Polling	May 23–24, 2013	556	± 4.2%	45%	45%	—	—	10%
Wenzel Strategies	June 1–2, 2013	623	± 3.9%	47%	40%	—	—	14%
Public Policy Polling	July 19–21, 2013	1,210	± 2.8%	44%	45%	—	—	11%
Wenzel Strategies	July 23–24, 2013	624	± 3.9%	48%	40%	—	—	12%
Lake Research Partners	August 5–15, 2013	5,000	± 1.4%	40%	46%	—	—	14%
Public Policy Polling	October 14–15, 2013	1,193	± 2.8%	43%	45%	—	—	12%
Lake Research Partners	October 24–29, 2013	603	± 4%	37%	37%	—	6%	19%
DFM Research	October 21–29, 2013	600	± 4%	41%	40%	—	—	19%
Public Policy Polling	December 12–15, 2013	1,509	± 2.5%	43%	42%	—	—	15%
Gravis Marketing	January 2, 2014	1,153	± 4%	42%	37%	—	8%	13%
Public Policy Polling	January 24–26, 2014	882	± ?%	45%	44%	—	—	11%
Rasmussen Reports	January 29–30, 2014	500	± 4.5%	42%	42%	—	6%	10%
Bluegrass Poll	January 30 – February 4, 2014	1,082	± 3%	42%	46%	—	—	12%
Wenzel Strategies	February 8–11, 2014	1,002	± 3.06%	43%	42%	—	—	15%
Public Policy Polling	April 1–2, 2014	663	± 4%	44%	45%	—	—	11%
New York Times/Kaiser Family	April 8–15, 2014	891	± ?	44%	43%	—	3%	11%
Gravis Marketing	April 15–17, 2014	1,359	± 3%	43%	36%	—	9%	12%
Hickman Analytics	April 24–30, 2014	500	± 4.4%	46%	45%	—	—	9%
NBC News/Marist	April 30 – May 6, 2014	2,353	± 2%	46%	45%	—	1%	8%
Bluegrass Poll	May 14–16, 2014	1,782	± 2.1%	42%	43%	4%	4%	7%
Wenzel Strategies	May 23–24, 2014	608	± 3.95%	47%	44%	—	—	8%
Rasmussen Reports	May 28–29, 2014	750	± 4%	48%	41%	—	5%	7%
Magellan Strategies	June 4–5, 2014	808	± 3.45%	46%	49%	—	—	5%
Public Policy Polling	June 20–22, 2014	682	± 3.8%	46%	48%	—	—	6%
Gravis Marketing	July 17–20, 2014	1,054	± 3%	45%	45%	—	—	10%
SurveyUSA	July 18–23, 2014	604	± 4.1%	41%	39%	7%	—	13%
SurveyUSA	July 18–23, 2014	604	± 4.1%	47%	45%	—	—	8%
CBS News/NYT/YouGov	July 5–24, 2014	1,546	± 4.2%	49%	45%	—	2%	4%
Wenzel Strategies	August 6, 2014	?	± ?	47%	44%	4%	—	5%
Wenzel Strategies	August 6, 2014	?	± ?	48%	44%	—	—	8%
Public Policy Polling	August 7–10, 2014	991	± 3.1%	44%	40%	7%	—	9%
Public Policy Polling	August 7–10, 2014	991	± 3.1%	47%	42%	—	—	11%
Bluegrass Poll	August 25–27, 2014	569	± 4.2%	46%	42%	5%	—	8%
CNN/ORC	August 28 – September 1, 2014	671	± 4%	50%	46%	—	1%	3%
CBS News/NYT/YouGov	August 18 – September 2, 2014	2,130	± 3%	47%	42%	—	2%	9%
Rasmussen Reports	September 1–2, 2014	750	± 4%	46%	41%	—	7%	6%
Public Opinion Strategies	September 1–3, 2014	600 LV	± 4%	47%	42%	4%	—	7%
NBC News/Marist	September 2–4, 2014	691 LV	± 3.7%	47%	39%	8%	<1%	6%
NBC News/Marist	September 2–4, 2014	1,184 RV	± 2.8%	45%	38%	9%	<1%	8%
Magellan Strategies	September 4–7, 2014	742 LV	± 3.6%	50%	42%	6%	—	2%
Mellman Group*	September 4–7, 2014	800 LV	± 3.5%	42%	43%	—	—	15%
Ipsos	September 8–12, 2014	944 LV	± 3.6%	46%	42%	—	5%	6%
Ipsos	September 8–12, 2014	1,755 RV	± 2.7%	36%	38%	—	9%	17%
ccAdvertising	September 9–16, 2014	2,282	± ?	42%	33%	—	—	25%
Gravis Marketing	September 13–16, 2014	839	± 3%	51%	41%	—	—	8%
Mellman Group*	September 19–27, 2014	1,800	± 2.3%	40%	42%	3%	—	16%
CBS News/NYT/YouGov	September 20 – October 1, 2014	1,689	± 3%	47%	41%	2%	1%	9%
Bluegrass Poll	September 29 – October 2, 2014	632	± 4%	44%	46%	3%	—	7%
Fox News	October 4–7, 2014	706	3.5%	45%	41%	3%	3%	8%
Gravis Marketing	October 11–12, 2014	1,020	± 3%	50%	47%	—	—	3%
Rasmussen Reports	October 15–16, 2014	1,000	± 3%	52%	44%	2%	—	2%
WKU/Big Red Poll	October 6–19, 2014	? LV	± ?%	45%	42%	5%	—	8%
WKU/Big Red Poll	October 6–19, 2014	601 RV	± 4%	45%	40%	5%	—	9%
SurveyUSA/Bluegrass Poll	October 15–19, 2014	655	± 3.9%	44%	43%	5%	—	8%
Voter Consumer Research^	October 16–19, 2014	815	± 3.5%	49%	41%	3%	—	7%
CBS News/NYT/YouGov	October 16–23, 2014	1,502	± 4%	45%	39%	2%	0%	14%
Public Opinion Strategies	October 25–27, 2014	600	± 4%	50%	43%	4%	0%	3%
SurveyUSA/Bluegrass Poll	October 26–30, 2014	597	± 4.1%	48%	43%	3%	—	6%
Public Policy Polling	October 26–30, 2014	556 LV	± 4.2%	50%	41%	5%	<1%	3%
Public Policy Polling	October 26–30, 2014	894 RV	± 3.3%	49%	39%	6%	<1%	6%
NBC News/Marist	October 26–30, 2014	556	± 4.2%	50%	41%	5%	<1%	3%
NBC News/Marist	October 26–30, 2014	894	± 3.3%	49%	39%	6%	<1%	6%
Public Policy Polling	October 30 – November 1, 2014	1,503	± 2.5%	50%	42%	3%	—	5%
Public Policy Polling	October 30 – November 1, 2014	1,503	± 2.5%	53%	44%	—	—	4%

Hypothetical polling

Poll source	Date(s) administered	Sample size	Margin of error	Matt Bevin (R)	Alison Lundergan Grimes (D)	David Patterson (L)	Other	Undecided
Wenzel Strategies	July 23–24, 2013	624	± 3.9%	35%	30%	—	—	36%
Lake Research Partners	October 24–29, 2013	603	± 4%	20%	38%	—	—	42%
Public Policy Polling	December 12–15, 2013	1,509	± 2.5%	39%	38%	—	—	24%
Bluegrass Poll	January 30 – February 4, 2014	1,082	± 3%	38%	43%	—	—	19%
Wenzel Strategies	February 8–11, 2014	1,002	± 3.06%	36%	39%	—	—	25%
New York Times/Kaiser Family	April 8–15, 2014	891	± ?	35%	41%	—	4%	19%
Gravis Marketing	April 15–17, 2014	1,359	± 3%	32%	37%	—	7%	25%
NBC News/Marist	April 30 – May 6, 2014	2,353	± 2%	37%	46%	—	1%	15%
Bluegrass Poll	May 14–16, 2014	1,782	± 2.1%	38%	41%	5%	4%	12%

Poll source	Date(s) administered	Sample size	Margin of error	Mitch McConnell (R)	Jerry Abramson (D)	Undecided
Public Policy Polling	December 7–9, 2012	1,266	± 2.8%	47%	43%	10%

Poll source	Date(s) administered	Sample size	Margin of error	Mitch McConnell (R)	Matthew Barzun (D)	Undecided
Public Policy Polling	December 7–9, 2012	1,266	± 2.8%	48%	37%	14%

Poll source	Date(s) administered	Sample size	Margin of error	Mitch McConnell (R)	Ben Chandler (D)	Undecided
Public Policy Polling	April 5–7, 2013	1,052	± 3%	46%	41%	13%

Poll source	Date(s) administered	Sample size	Margin of error	Mitch McConnell (R)	Jack Conway (D)	Undecided
Public Policy Polling	December 7–9, 2012	1,266	± 2.8%	47%	43%	9%

Poll source	Date(s) administered	Sample size	Margin of error	Mitch McConnell (R)	Adam Edelen (D)	Undecided
Public Policy Polling	December 7–9, 2012	1,266	± 2.8%	48%	36%	15%

Poll source	Date(s) administered	Sample size	Margin of error	Mitch McConnell (R)	Greg Fischer (D)	Undecided
Public Policy Polling	December 7–9, 2012	1,266	± 2.8%	46%	41%	13%

Poll source	Date(s) administered	Sample size	Margin of error	Mitch McConnell (R)	Tom FitzGerald (D)	Undecided
Wenzel Strategies	June 1–2, 2013	623	± 3.9%	47%	30%	24%

Poll source	Date(s) administered	Sample size	Margin of error	Mitch McConnell (R)	Heather French Henry (D)	Undecided
Wenzel Strategies	June 1–2, 2013	623	± 3.9%	46%	40%	14%

Poll source	Date(s) administered	Sample size	Margin of error	Mitch McConnell (R)	Ashley Judd (D)	Undecided
Public Policy Polling	December 7–9, 2012	1,266	± 2.8%	47%	43%	10%
Harper Polling	February 11–12, 2013	850	±3.36%	49%	40%	11%

Poll source	Date(s) administered	Sample size	Margin of error	Mitch McConnell (R)	Ed Marksberry (D)	Undecided
Public Policy Polling	April 5–7, 2013	1,052	± 3%	46%	35%	19%

Poll source	Date(s) administered	Sample size	Margin of error	Mitch McConnell (R)	John Yarmuth (D)	Undecided
Public Policy Polling	December 7–9, 2012	1,266	± 2.8%	48%	38%	14%

- ^ Internal poll for McConnell campaign
- * Internal Poll for Grimes campaign

=== Results ===
United States Senate election in Kentucky, 2014
Party	Candidate	Votes	%	±%
Republican	Mitch McConnell (incumbent)	806,787	56.19%	+3.22%
Democratic	Alison Lundergan Grimes	584,698	40.72%	−6.31%
Libertarian	David M. Patterson	44,240	3.08%	N/A
Write-in		143	0.01%	N/A
Total votes		1,453,868	100.0%	N/A
Republican hold				

==== Counties that flipped from Democratic to Republican ====
- Bourbon (largest city: Paris)
- Carroll (largest city: Carrollton)
- Breathitt (largest city: Jackson)
- Carter (largest city: Grayson)
- Hancock (largest city: Hawesville)
- Magoffin (largest city: Salyersville)
- Powell (largest city: Stanton)
- Trimble (largest city: Bedford)
- Webster (largest city: Providence)
- McLean (largest city: Livermore)
- Morgan (largest city: West Liberty)
- Harrison (largest city: Cynthiana)
- Knott (largest municipality: Hindman)
- Pike (largest municipality: Pikeville)
- Henderson (largest city: Henderson)
- Letcher (largest city: Jenkins)
- Muhlenberg (largest city: Central City)
- Floyd (largest municipality: Prestonburg)
- Greenup (largest city: Flatwoods)
- Fulton (largest city: Fulton)
- Fleming (largest city: Flemingsburg)
- Lincoln (largest city: Stanford)

==== By congressional district ====
McConnell won five of six congressional districts.

District	McConnell	Grimes	Representative
1st	61.73%	35.14%	Ed Whitfield
2nd	58.83%	37.83%	Brett Guthrie
3rd	41.11%	56.94%	John Yarmuth
4th	61.08%	35.6%	Thomas Massie
5th	65.24%	31.42%	Hal Rogers
6th	50.55%	46.0%	Andy Barr

== See also ==
- 2014 United States Senate elections
- 2014 United States elections
