= 1991 Kentucky elections =

A general election was held in the U.S. state of Kentucky on November 5, 1991. The primary election for all offices was held on May 28, 1991.

== Secretary of State ==
1991 Kentucky Secretary of State election
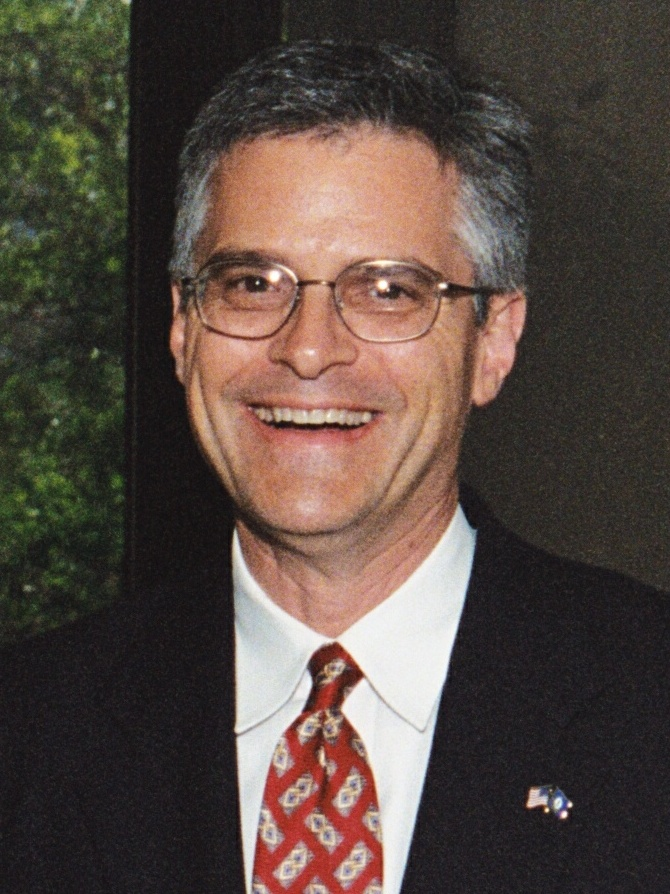

Nominee	Bob Babbage	Dexter S. Wright
Party	Democratic	Republican
Popular vote	492,119	226,006
Percentage	68.5%	31.5%
- County results Babbage: 50–60% 60–70% 70–80% 80–90% Wright: 50–60% 60–70%
Secretary of State before election
Bremer Ehrler
Democratic
Elected Secretary of State
Bob Babbage
Democratic

=== Results ===
1991 Kentucky Secretary of State election
Party	Candidate	Votes	%
Democratic	Bob Babbage	492,119	68.5
Republican	Dexter S. Wright	226,006	31.5
Total votes		718,125	100.0
Democratic hold			

== Attorney General ==
1991 Kentucky Attorney General election
Nominee	Chris Gorman	Tom Handy
Party	Democratic	Republican
Popular vote	450,593	280,557
Percentage	61.6%	38.4%
- County results Gorman: 50–60% 60–70% 70–80% 80–90% Handy: 50–60% 60–70% 70–80% 80–90%
Attorney General before election
Fred Cowan
Democratic
Elected Attorney General
Chris Gorman
Democratic

=== Results ===
1991 Kentucky Attorney General election
Party	Candidate	Votes	%
Democratic	Chris Gorman	450,593	61.6
Republican	Tom Handy	280,557	38.4
Total votes		731,150	100.0
Democratic hold			

== Auditor of Public Accounts ==
1991 Kentucky Auditor of Public Accounts election
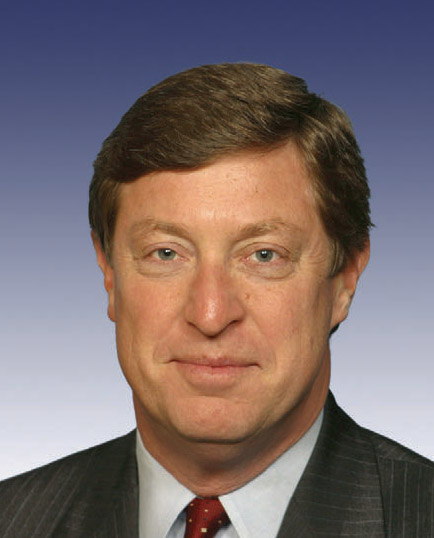

Nominee	Ben Chandler	Betty Holmes
Party	Democratic	Republican
Popular vote	465,119	251,973
Percentage	64.9%	35.1%
- County results Chandler: 50–60% 60–70% 70–80% 80–90% Holmes: 50–60% 60–70%
Auditor of Public Accounts before election
Bob Babbage
Democratic
Elected Auditor of Public Accounts
Ben Chandler
Democratic

=== Results ===
1991 Kentucky Auditor of Public Accounts election
Party	Candidate	Votes	%
Democratic	A. B. "Ben" Chandler	465,119	64.9
Republican	Betty Holmes	251,973	35.1
Total votes		717,092	100.0
Democratic hold			

== State Treasurer ==
1991 Kentucky State Treasurer election
Nominee	Frances Jones Mills	Don Bell
Party	Democratic	Republican
Popular vote	407,169	311,257
Percentage	56.7%	43.3%
- County results Mills: 50–60% 60–70% 70–80% 80–90% Bell: 50–60% 60–70% 70–80%
State Treasurer before election
Bob Mead
Democratic
Elected State Treasurer
Frances Jones Mills
Democratic

=== Results ===
1991 Kentucky State Treasurer election
Party	Candidate	Votes	%
Democratic	Frances Jones-Mills	407,169	56.7
Republican	Don Bell	311,257	43.3
Total votes		718,426	100.0
Democratic hold			

== Commissioner of Agriculture ==
1991 Kentucky Commissioner of Agriculture election
Nominee	Ed Logsdon	Leonard W. Beasley
Party	Democratic	Republican
Popular vote	465,475	232,331
Percentage	66.7%	33.3%
- County results Logsdon: 50–60% 60–70% 70–80% 80–90% Beasley: 50–60% 60–70% 70–80%
Commissioner of Agriculture before election
Charles Hamilton
Democratic
Elected Commissioner of Agriculture
Ed Logsdon
Democratic

=== Results ===
1991 Kentucky Commissioner of Agriculture election
Party	Candidate	Votes	%
Democratic	Ed Logsdon	465,475	66.7
Republican	Leonard W. "Buck" Beasley	232,331	33.3
Total votes		697,806	100.0
Democratic hold			

== Superintendent of Public Instruction ==
1991 Kentucky Superintendent of Public Instruction election
Nominee	John Stephenson	Donna Shedd
Party	Democratic	Republican
Popular vote	413,582	263,043
Percentage	61.1%	38.9%
- County results Stephenson: 50–60% 60–70% 70–80% 80–90% Shedd: 50–60% 60–70%
Superintendent of Public Instruction before election
John Brock
Democratic
Elected Superintendent of Public Instruction
John Stephenson
Democratic

=== Results ===
1991 Kentucky Superintendent of Public Instruction election
Party	Candidate	Votes	%
Democratic	John Stephenson	413,582	61.1
Republican	Donna Shedd	263,043	38.9
Total votes		676,625	100.0
Democratic hold			

== Railroad Commission ==
Results by county: Democratic candidates: 50–60%; 60–70%; 70–80%; 80–90%; 100%; Republican candidates: 50–60%; 60–70%

The three members of the Kentucky Railroad Commission were elected to four-year terms.

== Judicial elections ==
All judges of the Kentucky Court of Appeals and the Kentucky Circuit Courts were elected in non-partisan elections to eight-year terms.

== Local offices ==
=== Mayors ===
Mayors in Kentucky are elected to four-year terms. Prior to 1992, cities held their elections in odd-numbered years, in either the year preceding or following a presidential election.

=== City councils ===
Each incorporated city elected its council members to a two-year term.

== See also ==
- Elections in Kentucky
- Politics of Kentucky
- Political party strength in Kentucky
