= Kentucky's 21st House of Representatives district =

American legislative district

Kentucky's 21st State House of Representatives district
Representative
Amy Neighbors; R–Edmonton
since January 1, 2023
- Registration: 72.6% Republican; 20.4% Democratic; 6.7% No party preference
- Demographics: 92.0% White; 2.1% Black; 3.1% Hispanic; 0.2% Asian; 0.1% Native American; 0.1% Hawaiian/Pacific Islander; 2.3% Multiracial
- Population (2023): 46,654
- Registered voters (2025): 35,982

Kentucky's 21st House of Representatives district is one of 100 districts in the Kentucky House of Representatives. Located in the southern part of the state, it comprises the counties of Adair, Cumberland, Metcalfe, and Monroe. It has been represented by Amy Neighbors (R–Edmonton) since 2023. As of 2023, the district had a population of 46,654.

== Voter registration ==
On January 1, 2025, the district had 35,982 registered voters, who were registered with the following parties.

Party	Registration	
Party	Voters	%
Republican	26,108	72.56
Democratic	7,326	20.36
Independent	1,250	3.47
Libertarian	91	0.25
Green	20	0.06
Constitution	14	0.04
Socialist Workers	4	0.01
Reform	1	0.00
"Other"	1,168	3.25
Total	35,982	100.00
Source: Kentucky State Board of Elections

== List of members representing the district ==
Member	Party	Years	Electoral history	District location
Billy Ray Smith (Bowling Green)	Democratic	January 1, 1982 – December 31, 1995	Elected in 1981. Reelected in 1984. Reelected in 1986. Reelected in 1988. Reelected in 1990. Reelected in 1992. Reelected in 1994. Resigned after being elected Kentucky Commissioner of Agriculture.	1974–1985; Simpson (part) and Warren (part) Counties.
Billy Ray Smith (Bowling Green)	Democratic	January 1, 1982 – December 31, 1995	Elected in 1981. Reelected in 1984. Reelected in 1986. Reelected in 1988. Reelected in 1990. Reelected in 1992. Reelected in 1994. Resigned after being elected Kentucky Commissioner of Agriculture.	1985–1993; Simpson (part) and Warren (part) Counties.
Billy Ray Smith (Bowling Green)	Democratic	January 1, 1982 – December 31, 1995	Elected in 1981. Reelected in 1984. Reelected in 1986. Reelected in 1988. Reelected in 1990. Reelected in 1992. Reelected in 1994. Resigned after being elected Kentucky Commissioner of Agriculture.	1993–1997; Simpson (part) and Warren (part) Counties.
Roger Thomas (Smiths Grove)	Democratic	February 22, 1996 – January 1, 2005	Elected to finish Smith's term. Reelected in 1996. Reelected in 1998. Reelected in 2000. Reelected in 2002. Lost reelection.	1993–1997; Simpson (part) and Warren (part) Counties.
Roger Thomas (Smiths Grove)	Democratic	February 22, 1996 – January 1, 2005	Elected to finish Smith's term. Reelected in 1996. Reelected in 1998. Reelected in 2000. Reelected in 2002. Lost reelection.	1997–2003
Roger Thomas (Smiths Grove)	Democratic	February 22, 1996 – January 1, 2005	Elected to finish Smith's term. Reelected in 1996. Reelected in 1998. Reelected in 2000. Reelected in 2002. Lost reelection.	2003–2015
Jim DeCesare (Bowling Green)	Republican	January 1, 2005 – January 1, 2015	Elected in 2004. Reelected in 2006. Reelected in 2008. Reelected in 2010. Reelected in 2012. Redistricted to the 17th district.	2003–2015
Bart Rowland (Tompkinsville)	Republican	January 1, 2015 – January 1, 2023	Redistricted from the 53rd district and reelected in 2014. Reelected in 2016. Reelected in 2018. Reelected in 2020. Retired.	2015–2023
Amy Neighbors (Edmonton)	Republican	January 1, 2023 – present	Elected in 2022. Reelected in 2024. Reelected in 2026.	2023–present
