= Roger Thomas (Kentucky politician) =

American politician

Member of the Kentucky House of Representatives from the 21st district
- In office February 22, 1996 – January 1, 2005
- Preceded by: Billy Ray Smith
- Succeeded by: Jim DeCesare

Personal details
- Born: August 20, 1950 (age 75)
- Party: Democratic

James Roger Thomas (born August 20, 1950) is an American politician from Kentucky who was a member of the Kentucky House of Representatives from 1996 to 2005. Thomas was first elected in a February 1996 special election following the resignation of incumbent Billy Ray Smith to become state agriculture commissioner. He was defeated for reelection in 2004 by Republican Jim DeCesare.
