= The Woodford Sun =

Weekly American newspaper

- Type: Weekly newspaper
- Publisher: Ben Chandler
- Founded: 1869
- City: Versailles, Kentucky
- Website: woodfordsun.com

The Woodford Sun is a weekly newspaper in Versailles, Kentucky. It is the newspaper of record for Woodford County.

The Sun was established in 1869 as The Woodford Weekly, and later consolidated with The Midway Sun. In 1942, A.B. "Happy" Chandler, former Kentucky governor and U.S. senator, purchased the newspaper. The family still owns and operates the paper, and Ben Chandler, former Kentucky attorney general and U.S. representative, became publisher in 2022. The Sun occupies an office on Main Street in Versailles.

In 2026, the newspaper announced it would shift to a nonprofit model — the first legacy newspaper in Kentucky to do so, and part of a national trend as newspaper advertising revenue has dwindled in the 21st century. The Sun's nonprofit transition will form the Woodford Sun Community Newspaper. Chandler told the Kentucky Lantern the nonprofit change "will keep the paper alive." The Sun operates with a staff of fewer than 10, including several part-time staffers. It prints a weekly publication of about 12-14 pages, and serves about 2,300 subscribers.

Albert Benjamin "Ben" Chandler Jr., longtime publisher and the son of Happy Chandler, was inducted to the Kentucky Journalism Hall of Fame in 2012, in part for his "Happy Landings" column, which "showed his editorial leadership through the weekly newspaper’s reliable, well-edited and comprehensive news pages. He has included aggressive coverage of planning, zoning and development issues, a major focus of public concern in Woodford County during most of his tenure."
