= 2004 Kentucky's 6th congressional district special election =

- February 17, 2004
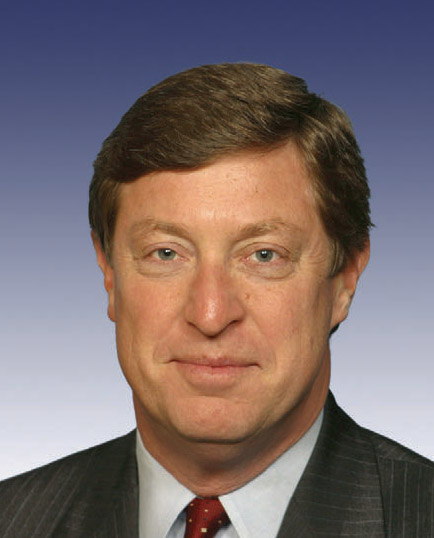

Nominee	Ben Chandler	Alice Kerr
Party	Democratic	Republican
Popular vote	84,168	65,474
Percentage	55.16%	42.91%
- County results Chandler: 50–60% 60–70% Kerr: 50–60%
U.S. Representative before election
Ernie Fletcher
Republican
Elected U.S. Representative
Ben Chandler
Democratic

The 2004 United States House of Representatives special election in Kentucky's 6th congressional district was held on February 17, 2004, to select the successor to Ernie Fletcher (R) who resigned upon being elected Governor of Kentucky. Each party held a nominating convention to choose their nominee for the special election. Republicans selected state Senator Alice Kerr over state Representatives Stan Lee and Lonnie Napier and Lexington city councilman Charles Ellinger II as their nominee while Democrats chose former state Attorney General and 2003 Democratic gubernatorial nominee Ben Chandler.

Chandler won the election to fill out the rest of Fletcher's unexpired term. This was a symbolic victory for Democrats considering that the man Chandler succeeded was the same one he lost to in the Gubernatorial election months earlier. Though Kerr was able to out raise and out spend Chandler, it was not enough to overcome his popularity, who in addition to having served as state attorney general was also the grandson of Happy Chandler, a former governor, U.S. Senator, and Commissioner of Baseball, in this conservative, but generally ticket-splitting Lexington centered District, which supported Fletcher with 71% in 2002, and George W. Bush over Al Gore by a smaller but nonetheless substantial 55% to 42% margin in the Presidential election of 2000.

== Election results ==
Kentucky's 6th congressional district special election, 2004
Party	Candidate	Votes	%
Democratic	Ben Chandler	84,168	55.16
Republican	Alice Kerr	65,474	42.91
Libertarian	Mark Gailey	2,952	1.93
Total votes		152,594	100.00
Democratic gain from Republican			
