= Crit Luallen =

American politician (born 1952)

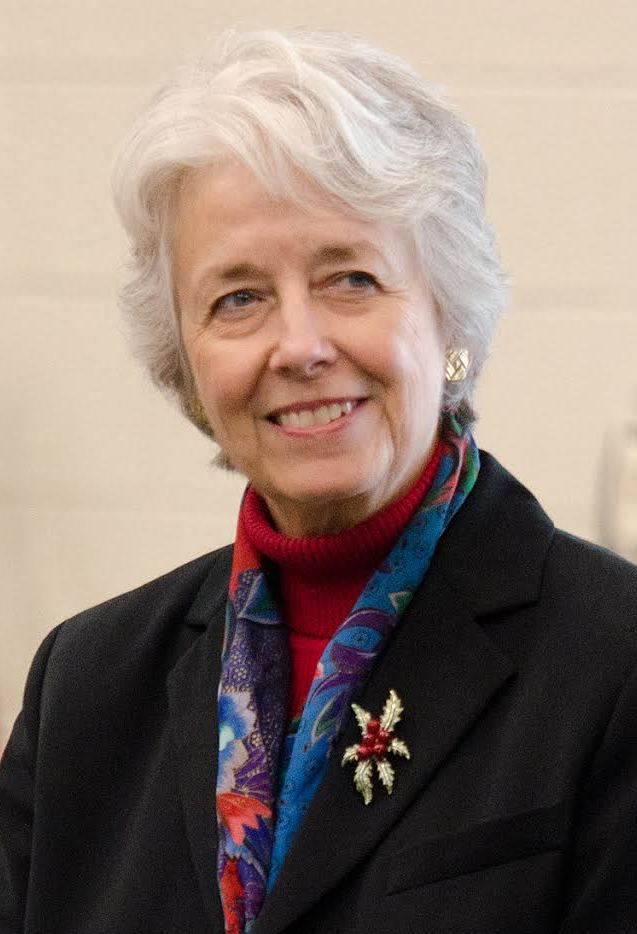

56th Lieutenant Governor of Kentucky
- In office November 13, 2014 – December 8, 2015
- Governor: Steve Beshear
- Preceded by: Jerry Abramson
- Succeeded by: Jenean Hampton

Auditor of Kentucky
- In office January 5, 2004 – January 2, 2012
- Governor: Ernie Fletcher; Steve Beshear
- Preceded by: Ed Hatchett
- Succeeded by: Adam Edelen

Personal details
- Born: July 21, 1952 (age 74) Frankfort, Kentucky, U.S.
- Party: Democratic
- Spouse: Lynn Luallen
- Education: Centre College

Eugenia Crittenden "Crit" Luallen (née Blackburn; born July 21, 1952) is an American politician who served as the 56th lieutenant governor of Kentucky from November 13, 2014, to December 8, 2015. Luallen previously served as Kentucky State Auditor.

== Early life and career ==
Luallen is a native of Frankfort, Kentucky and graduated from Frankfort High School, before studying at Centre College in Danville, Kentucky, graduating in 1974. Luallen is descended from John Jordan Crittenden and Luke Pryor Blackburn, and she shares her name with both men. After graduating from Centre College, Luallen began working in the mailroom of Wendell Ford's senate campaign. Her dedication and work ethic, in the campaign, led to her working in communications. After Ford's campaign, Luallen worked on Julian Carroll's gubernatorial campaign and in the administration of John Y. Brown Jr.

In 1983, Luallen worked on the gubernatorial campaign for on Martha Layne Collins, serving as the Campaign Media Coordinator. She worked in the Collins administration, as a Special Assistant, and she was later appointed Commissioner of the Kentucky Department of the Arts. As Commissioner of the Arts, Luallen helped found the Kentucky Governor's School for the Arts. After Governor Collins left office in 1988, Luallen took a position working with the Greater Louisville Economic Development Partnership, a position she retained until 1992. Luallen returned to government in 1992, after taking being appointed the Secretary of the Kentucky Tourism Cabinet, a position she held until 1994. From 1994 to 1995, Luallen served as Secretary of the Finance and Administration Cabinet. In 1995, Paul E. Patton was elected Governor of Kentucky, and Luallen served as Secretary of the Executive Cabinet until 2002. Luallen received attention during her tenure under Governor Patton, particularly for helping to negotiate a 1997 tax incentive package for the United Parcel Service, during the 2000 tax reforms, as well as for her role in the 1997 higher education reforms.

== Kentucky Auditor ==
She was elected to the position of state auditor in November 2003 and was re-elected by a wide margin in the 2007 Kentucky State Elections. Luallen was not eligible to run for another term as Auditor in 2011. As Auditor, Luallen received near-universal praise, "uncovering millions of dollars in fraud—sending up a then-unheard-of 120 cases to law enforcement." She was seen as "a non-partisan figure whose work resulted in the prosecution of 34 public officials, many from her own party." On Luallen's willingness as state auditor to search out crime, Assistant U.S. Attorney Ken Taylor commented, "I am very impressed with that office under her. They have the right attitude about being a watchdog." During her tenure as Auditor, Luallen successfully battled colon cancer and another unspecified cancer in 2004 and 2005.

Luallen was considered a top contender for the Democratic nomination to challenge Senator Mitch McConnell in the 2008 Election before announcing her decision not to run but instead to remain as Auditor. In December 2011, Luallen said "At this stage in my career, I think the next race for me if I decide to run for statewide race would be for governor", and ruled out running against McConnell in 2014. In April 2014, she ruled out running for Governor in 2015.

== Lieutenant Governor of Kentucky ==
On November 6, 2014, Governor Steve Beshear appointed Luallen Lieutenant Governor of Kentucky, effective November 13, 2014. Luallen completed the term of Jerry Abramson who was appointed Deputy Assistant to the President and Director of Intergovernmental Affairs by President Barack Obama.

== Honors ==
- 1994- Centre College Distinguished Alumni induction
- 2001- National Excellence in Leadership award from Women Executives in State Government
- 2009- Public Officials of the Year honoree from Governing
- 2012- Fontaine Banks Award for Distinguished Service from Bluegrass Council of the Boy Scouts of America
- 2012- Martha Layne Collins award from Women Leading Kentucky
- 2012- Honorary degree from Spalding University
- 2012- Kentucky Women Remembered induction
- 2015- Louisville Business First Enterprising Woman of Achievement

== See also ==
- List of female lieutenant governors in the United States

Party political offices
Preceded by Ed Hatchett	Democratic nominee for Kentucky Auditor of Public Accounts; 2003, 2007	Succeeded by Adam Edelen
Political offices
Preceded by Jerry Abramson	Lieutenant Governor of Kentucky; 2014–2015	Succeeded by Jenean Hampton
