= Thomas Scudder Page =

American politician (1800–1877)

Kentucky State Auditor
- In office 1839–? 1851–?
- Appointed by: James Clark (1839)

Personal details
- Born: April 19, 1800 New York City, New York, US
- Died: April 17, 1877 (aged 76)
- Party: Know Nothing (after 1855); Whig (before 1855)

Thomas Scudder Page (April 19, 1800 – April 17, 1877) was Kentucky's first elected auditor of public accounts, and the first elected official to be tried for corruption in that state.

== Biography ==
He was born in New York City, and moved to Kentucky in 1817.

He became a clerk with the Land Office and in 1839, was appointed auditor by Governor James Clark.

Under Kentucky's third constitution, auditor became an elected position. Page was elected in 1851 as a Whig and in 1855, with the Know Nothing party. He required official collectors of funds to deposit their collections with the Auditor's office, rather than the state treasurer directly, and in 1859, was sued for corruption by the state for embezzling $88,927 (~$2.48 million in 2024). Page declared bankruptcy in 1863. In 1867, he was ordered by the legislature to repay the state $88,000, plus interest and court costs. The case was settled by special act of the legislature that year, with Page agreeing to repay half.

He lived the remaining 10 years of his life in destitution in Frankfort, and was buried in Frankfort Cemetery.
