= Adam Edelen =

American politician (born 1974)

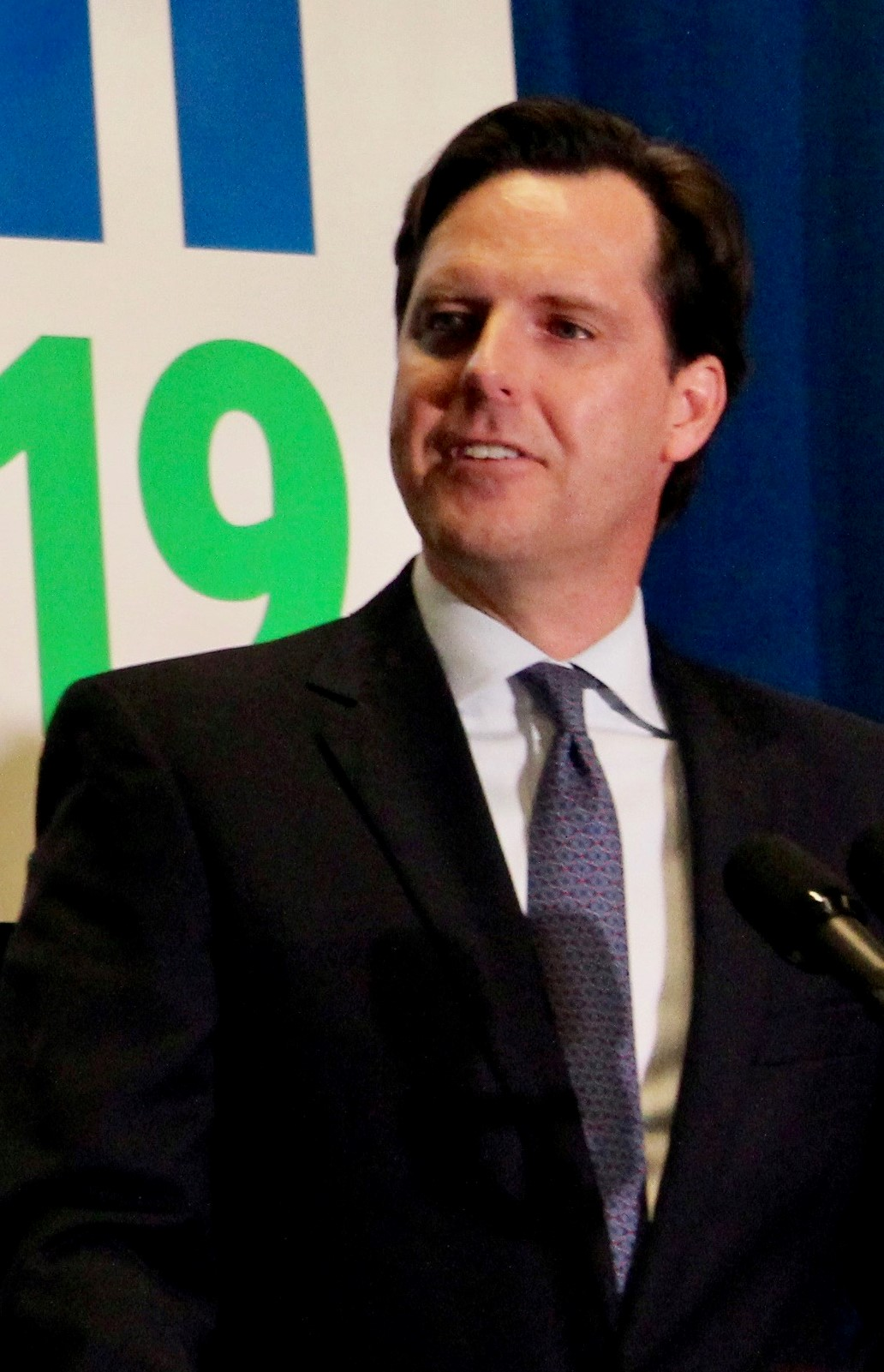
- Edelen in 2019

47th Auditor of Kentucky
- In office January 2, 2012 – January 4, 2016
- Governor: Steve Beshear; Matt Bevin
- Preceded by: Crit Luallen
- Succeeded by: Mike Harmon

Personal details
- Born: November 26, 1974 (age 51) Flaherty, Kentucky, U.S.
- Party: Democratic
- Children: 2
- Education: University of Kentucky (BA)
- Website: Campaign website

Adam Edelen (born November 26, 1974) is an American businessman, solar energy entrepreneur, and politician who served as the Auditor of Public Accounts for the Commonwealth of Kentucky from 2012 to 2016.

Prior to that, he was the Chief of Staff for Democratic Kentucky Governor Steve Beshear from July 2008 until September 15, 2010. He resigned from his position as the governor's Chief of Staff to work as a business consultant, before running for the Auditor of Public Accounts for the Commonwealth of Kentucky. In 2019, he ran for Governor of Kentucky with running mate Gill Holland, where he finishing in third place for the Democratic nomination .

== Early years and career ==
Edelen was born on a family farm in Meade County, Kentucky. His mother was 16 when he was born. His parents divorced when he was young, and his time as a child was divided between his mother's home in Louisville and his father's farm in rural Meade County.

Edelen is a graduate of the University of Kentucky, where he was a member of Delta Tau Delta social fraternity.

At 21, he started his public service career as an aide to Kentucky Governor Paul Patton. He worked in the private sector as a senior executive at the Greater Lexington Chamber of Commerce (Commerce Lexington) and Thomas & King, Inc.

In 2002, Edelen unsuccessfully ran for the Lexington-Fayette Urban County Council. Of the six candidates for the three at-large seats, he finished in fifth place.

In 2008, he returned to the public sector, serving as Director of the Kentucky Office of Homeland Security and then as Chief of Staff to Governor Steve Beshear.

== Kentucky Auditor ==
Edelen won election to Kentucky Auditor of Public Accounts on November 8, 2011, defeating Republican John T. Kemper III by a margin of 11.6%.

Shortly after his inauguration, Edelen initiated an examination of the former administration of the Kentucky Department of Agriculture. This examination was conducted at the request of the Republican Agriculture Commissioner, James Comer. The examination found rampant spending abuses and a culture of entitlement. Former commissioner and UK basketball star Richie Farmer was sentenced to 27 months in prison on federal charges and a year in prison on a state charge based on issues identified in Edelen's report.

Edelen also led an effort to reform special districts, which represent a $2.7 billion layer of government. The effort led to a report and the creation of a database with financial information for approximately 1,200 entities, including libraries, fire districts, and health departments. In 2013, Edelen helped shepherd a measure through the legislature to bring more accountability and transparency to the entities. House Bill 1 – as dubbed by the Speaker of the House-passed with broad, bipartisan support. The National State Auditors Association selected the initiative as one of its Excellence in Accountability Award recipients. The leadership of Common Cause KY described the initiative as a significant step for government reform.

When private, multibillion-dollar insurance companies took over the state's Medicaid system, Edelen proposed recommendations for the state and managed care organizations (MCOs) to address issues in implementation. The Auditor's office found the managed care companies were not efficiently processing claims to health care providers despite receiving more than 700 million taxpayer dollars. Edelen created a new Medicaid Accountability and Transparency Unit in the Auditor's office to provide real-time oversight over the second-largest expenditure in state government.

In 2012, Edelen began examining spending practices in public schools. Special examinations in 15 public school districts found wasteful spending, lack of oversight of superintendent contracts by school boards and other abuses. One exam led to criminal conviction of a former superintendent and more than $500,000 returned to the community. The Kentucky Department of Education began requiring school districts to post superintendent contracts online, aligning with recommendations from Edelen's office.

In 2014, Edelen proposed legislation to strengthen Kentucky's cyber security protections and require state and local government to notify citizens if their data is compromised in a data breach. Kentucky was one of four states that lacked security breach notification laws. House Bill 5 passed the House 99–1 and the Senate unanimously.

In 2015, Edelen lost his re-election bid to Republican Mike Harmon.

The efforts of Edelen's auditor administration to expose the practice of special districts was a focus of a segment on Last Week Tonight with John Oliver.

== Eastern Kentucky solar project ==
In 2017, news articles began circulating which detailed a project in which Edelen is involved that plans to install tens of thousands of solar panels on a reclaimed surface mine in eastern Kentucky. The project aims to create jobs for former coal miners in building and installing solar panels. The project is planned as the first large-scale solar panel installation in the Appalachian region and one of the largest in Kentucky. In a 2018 interview with Kentucky Today, Edelen said he was prioritizing the project over a run for governor.

In January 2019, Edelen said the power has been sold and the project will move forward within the next few weeks.

== 2019 Kentucky gubernatorial campaign ==
After nearly four years away from politics and in the private sector, Edelen declared his candidacy for the Democratic nomination for governor of Kentucky on January 7, 2019, making him the fourth and final Democrat to enter the race. Edelen chose Gill Holland, a Louisville community builder, filmmaker, and environmentalist, as his lieutenant governor candidate.

The ticket touted a platform of no PAC contributions, a living wage, acknowledgement of climate change, green jobs, fully funded public and higher education, universal broadband internet, expanded healthcare and protection of the Medicaid expansion. Edelen also pledged to appoint women to at least six of Kentucky's 12 cabinet positions. He came in third in the primary.

== Awards ==
Edelen was one of Government Technology magazine's 2014 Top 25 Doers, Dreamers and Drivers, an award bestowed on innovators in the public sector across the country. In 2008, Edelen was named one of the Ten Outstanding Young Americans by the United States Junior Chamber of Commerce. This award is one of the oldest service honors in the United States, with previous recipients including John F. Kennedy, Richard Nixon, Gerald Ford and Bill Clinton.

Other honors include:

- New Leaders Council 40 Under 40 Leadership Award recipient
- Aspen Institute Rodel fellow
- American-Swiss Foundation Young Leader

== Community service ==
As a gubernatorial appointee to the board of Kentucky Educational Television, Edelen supported the 'Be Well Kentucky' initiative, which aimed to address public health issues in the state.

== Personal life ==
Edelen has two twin sons, Wade and Hamilton. Edelen makes his home in Lexington, Kentucky. He is a member of Lexington's First Presbyterian Church. He is an avid sportsman, reader of history, and University of Kentucky basketball fan.

Party political offices
Preceded by Crit Luallen	Democratic nominee for Auditor of Kentucky; 2011, 2015	Succeeded by Sheri Donahue
Political offices
Preceded by Crit Luallen	Auditor of Kentucky; 2012–2016	Succeeded by Mike Harmon
