= Trey Grayson =

American lawyer (born 1972)

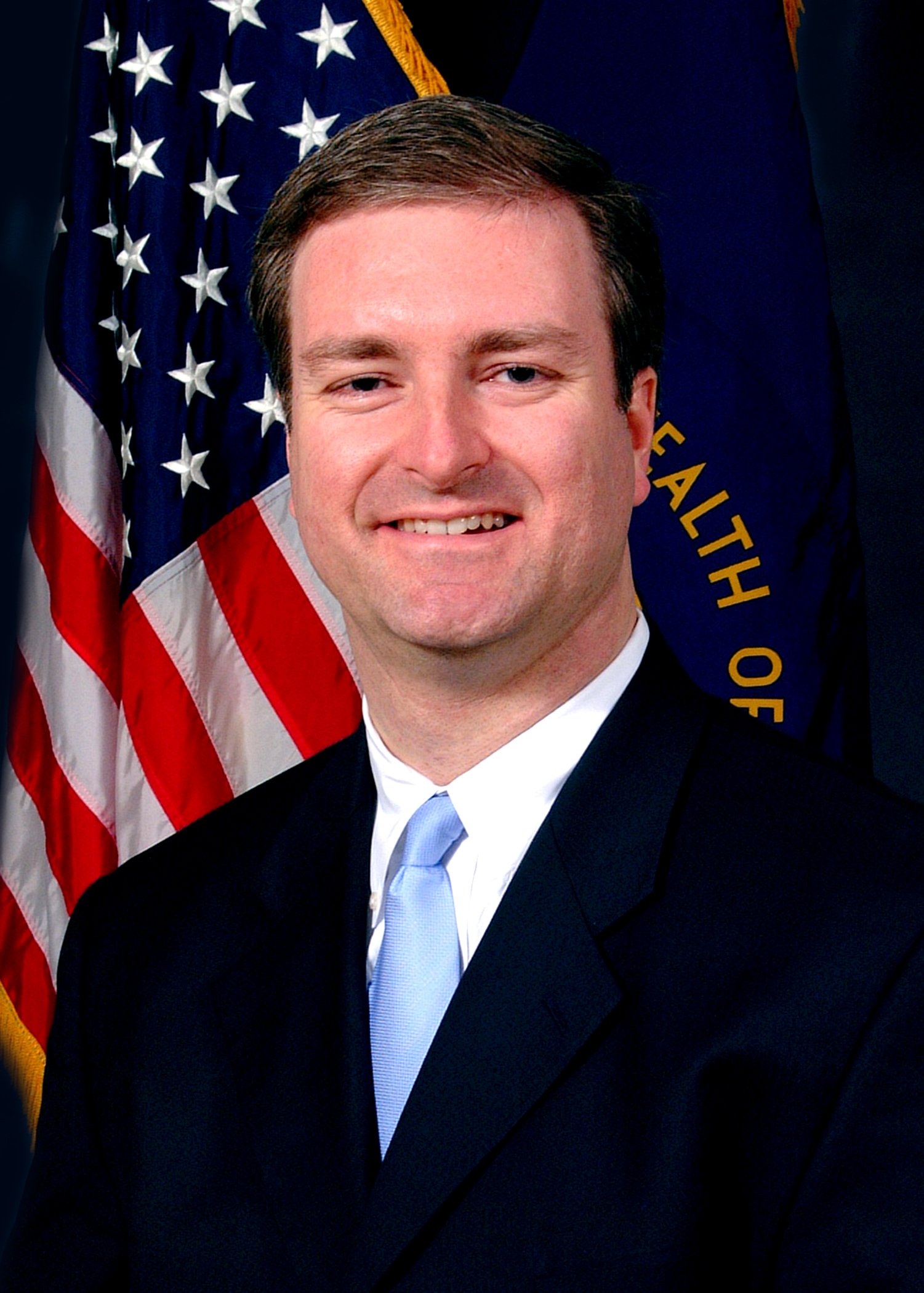

Director of the Harvard Institute of Politics
- In office January 31, 2011 – June 5, 2014
- Preceded by: John Culver
- Succeeded by: Maggie Williams

83rd Secretary of State of Kentucky
- In office January 5, 2004 – January 29, 2011
- Governor: Ernie Fletcher; Steve Beshear
- Preceded by: John Young Brown III
- Succeeded by: Elaine Walker

Personal details
- Born: Charles Merwin Grayson III; April 18, 1972 (age 54) Kenton County, Kentucky, U.S.
- Party: Republican
- Spouse: Nancy Grayson
- Children: 2
- Education: Harvard University (BA); University of Kentucky (MBA, JD)
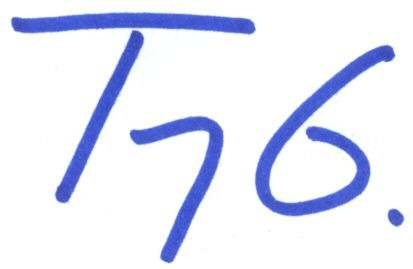
- Signature

Charles Merwin "Trey" Grayson III (born April 18, 1972) is an American politician and attorney who is a partner at FBT Gibbons, where he leads the firm's lobbying and public policy practice. A former Secretary of State of Kentucky, Grayson was a candidate in the 2010 Republican primary to replace retiring U.S. Senator Jim Bunning, losing to Rand Paul, the Tea Party favorite. He later was the director of the Harvard Institute of Politics. Grayson also was CEO of the Northern Kentucky Chamber of Commerce.

== Early life, education, and law career ==
A product of the Kenton County public school system, Grayson was inducted into the Kentucky Association for Academic Competition Hall of Fame for his achievements in the Governor's Cup and other academic competitions at Dixie Heights High School. He was a 1989 Governor's Scholar and later president of the program's alumni association.

Grayson graduated from Harvard University with honors in 1994 with an A.B. in government. He then returned to Kentucky, entering a JD/MBA dual-degree program at the University of Kentucky, where he was one of the first Kentucky MBA scholars and one of the first two Bert T. Combs Scholars, the College of Law's top scholarship.

After earning both degrees in 1998, he worked as an attorney with Greenebaum Doll & McDonald and later Keating, Muething & Klekamp, where he focused on estate planning and corporate law.

== Republican activism ==
Although a member of the Democratic Party during his collegiate years, voting for Bill Clinton in the 1992 presidential election, Grayson became a member of the Republican Party shortly after graduating, citing his conservative beliefs.

In 2005, he was selected for the inaugural class of the Aspen-Rodel Fellowships in Public Leadership, which recognize the nation's top young elected officials. In 2004, The Council of State Governments selected him to participate in the Toll Fellowship Program, and he was recognized at the 2004 Republican National Convention by United Leaders as a "Rising Star" in the Republican Party.

In 2004, Grayson became a member of the senior advisory committee to Harvard University's Institute of Politics. Grayson has been on a variety of advisory boards of several national, election-related organizations and the steering committee for the Campaign for the Civic Mission of Schools.

Grayson has had various national leadership positions, including chair of the Republican Association of Secretaries of State. A former NASS Treasurer, chair of the NASS Elections committee, co-chair of the NASS Presidential Primary subcommittee, vice-chair of the NASS committee on voter participation, and NASS representative on the Council of State Government Executive Committee, he is also on the NASS standing committee on business services and the NASS executive committee. Through these positions, he has become a national authority on presidential primary reform and election administration.

== Kentucky Secretary of State ==
Grayson was elected Kentucky's Secretary of State in 2003. When he was sworn into office, he was the nation's youngest secretary of state, at 31. Grayson modernized the Office of the Secretary of State by bringing more services online, enhanced Kentucky's election laws through several legislative packages, and revived the civic mission of Kentucky schools by leading the effort to restore civics education.

During his first term, his office placed millions of images online and launched several new online services to eliminate bureaucratic impediments to starting a business or running for office. Grayson led a nationally recognized effort to increase the civic literacy of Kentucky's youth and helped change Kentucky's election laws, including a repeal of public financing of gubernatorial campaigns.

During his first term there was a controversy involving the State Board of Elections' purging of approximately 8,000 Kentucky voters from the Kentucky voter rolls because the voters had moved out of state. Grayson and the state board of elections were defendants in a lawsuit filed by then Kentucky Attorney General Greg Stumbo. A circuit judge ruled that the Board's actions were legal but asked Grayson to take additional steps to ensure voters would not be disenfranchised. Grayson later admitted to National Public Radio that the Office had made a technical mistake in purging some of the voters, but that the concept was important.

Grayson was reelected Secretary of State in 2007 by a 14-point margin. He became one of only two Republican statewide elected constitutional officers to win a second consecutive term in modern history

In Grayson's second term, he launched new services that allow companies to start businesses online, reducing by several days the time it takes start a business in Kentucky. He also led the effort to modernize Kentucky's business laws, making it easier to start a business in Kentucky. His office was the first government entity in Kentucky to put its spending online so that taxpayers could hold his office accountable for how their tax dollars are spent. He also cut spending in his office by 15%.

Grayson supported a policy change made by Governor Steve Beshear that made it easier for some convicted felons to apply to have their voting rights restored. The Secretary of State's office is part of the technical process to restore voting rights, as the governor's paperwork is filed with the office. Grayson did not support automatic restoration of voting rights to all convicted felons.

Grayson administered the $37 million Kentucky received in federal funds to implement the Help America Vote Act (HAVA), as well the $169,755 grant from the Federal Election Assistance for Individuals with Disabilities (EAID). These funds allowed every Kentucky county to purchase a new machine for every precinct.

== 2010 U.S. Senate election ==
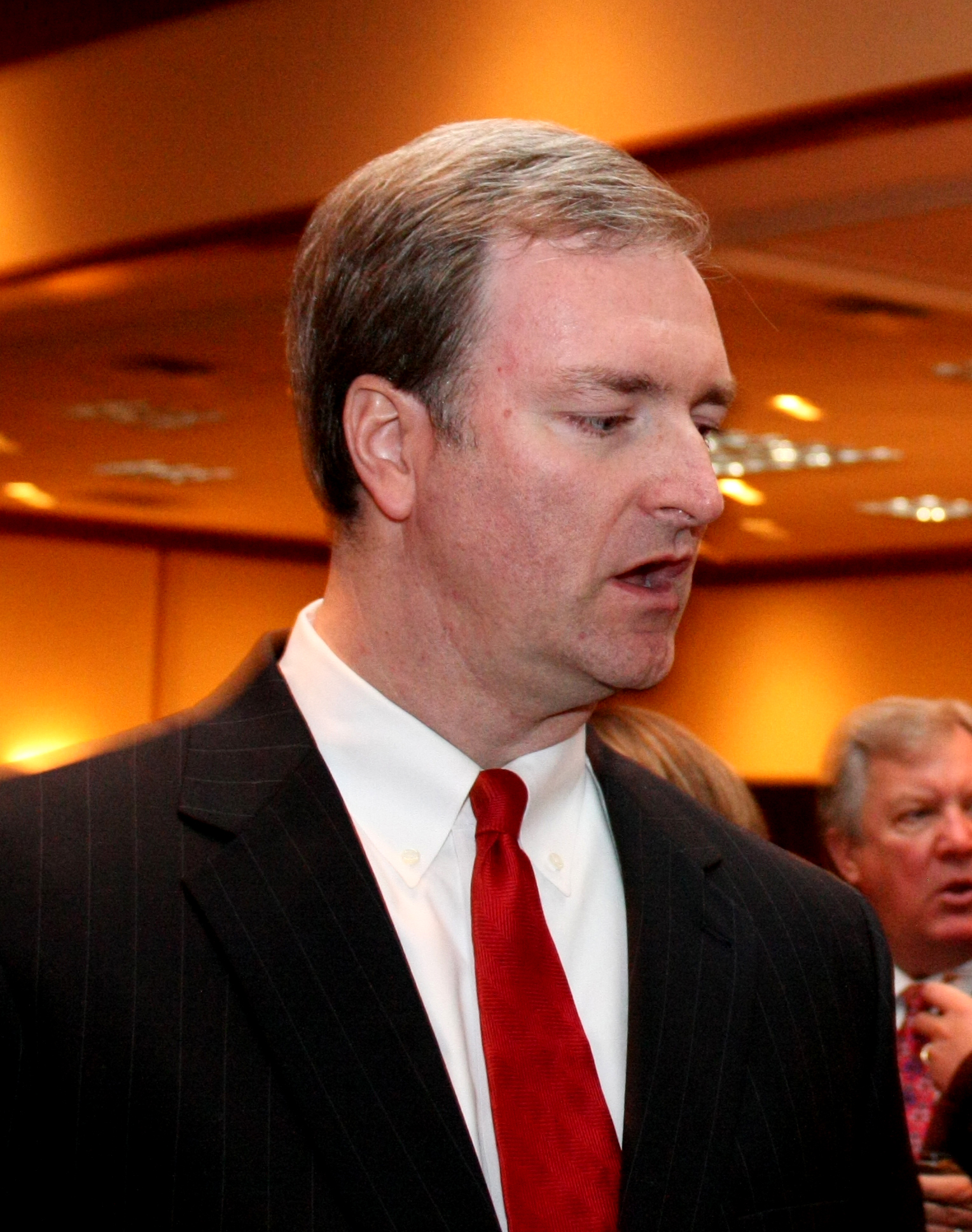
Grayson campaigning for U.S. Senate in December 2009.

Grayson ran in the 2010 Republican primary for U.S. Senate in Kentucky, losing to Rand Paul by a 23-point margin.

=== Endorsements ===
Grayson was endorsed by Senator Mitch McConnell, former Vice President Dick Cheney, former New York City mayor Rudy Giuliani, Senator Rick Santorum, Representative Hal Rogers, and several members of Kentucky's State legislature.

In late April, Focus on the Family founder James Dobson endorsed Grayson, saying he was the only candidate with the conviction to lead Kentucky. But a week later, Dobson rescinded his endorsement and endorsed Paul, claiming to have been misled by senior Republican officials about Paul's stance on abortion. Dobson did not claim Grayson was complicit in misleading him, but two days later Paul aired commercials claiming that Grayson and other GOP leaders "deliberately deceived one of America's leading conservatives, Dr. James Dobson." The ads were later removed.

=== Results ===
Grayson lost to Paul by a 23.33% margin, with 124,710 votes to Paul's 206,812.

After conceding the election to Paul, Grayson said, "It's time to put all differences aside, unite behind Dr. Paul. He needs our help and I for one stand ready to serve". He downplayed the effect of the Tea Party's support for Paul, saying, "I think there are just so many things at work here, it's hard to pinpoint it. I think the tea party [vs.] conservative establishment thing is a little too simplistic."

== Later career ==
On January 7, 2011, it was announced that Grayson would resign as Secretary of State to accept a position at the John F. Kennedy School of Government at Harvard University. He became the Director of the Harvard Institute of Politics. Governor Beshear named Bowling Green, Kentucky Mayor Elaine Walker as Grayson's replacement. Grayson's resignation became effective January 29, 2011.

At Harvard, Grayson oversaw many nationally recognized studies of political shifts between different blocks of voters, especially millennials. He was also a frequent moderator of school panels and lectures by many of the nation's top leaders.

In 2012, Grayson joined Gabrielle Giffords's "Gabby PAC" as co-chairman.

In April 2014, it was announced that Grayson would resign from Harvard University effective June 30.

On May 21, 2014, the Northern Kentucky Chamber of Commerce announced Grayson would become the president and CEO of the organization, effective July 1.

In May 2017, the Northern Kentucky Chamber of Commerce announced Grayson would resign as president and CEO effective June 9.

Later that year, in September, Frost Brown Todd announced that Grayson would joining its team as a member and a principal for CivicPoint, the firm's public affairs affiliate.

In June 2020, Grayson participated in the Transition Integrity Project, a group that considered scenarios for a contested presidential election in the fall. He continues to write opinion columns on subjects such as prioritizing economic development over "anti-LGBTQ stunts" and in favor of broader funding sources for election assurance.

Party political offices
Vacant Title last held by Steve Crabtree	Republican nominee for Secretary of State of Kentucky; 2003, 2007	Succeeded by Bill Johnson
Political offices
Preceded by John Brown	Secretary of State of Kentucky; 2004–2011	Succeeded by Elaine Walker
