= Bob Babbage =

American politician

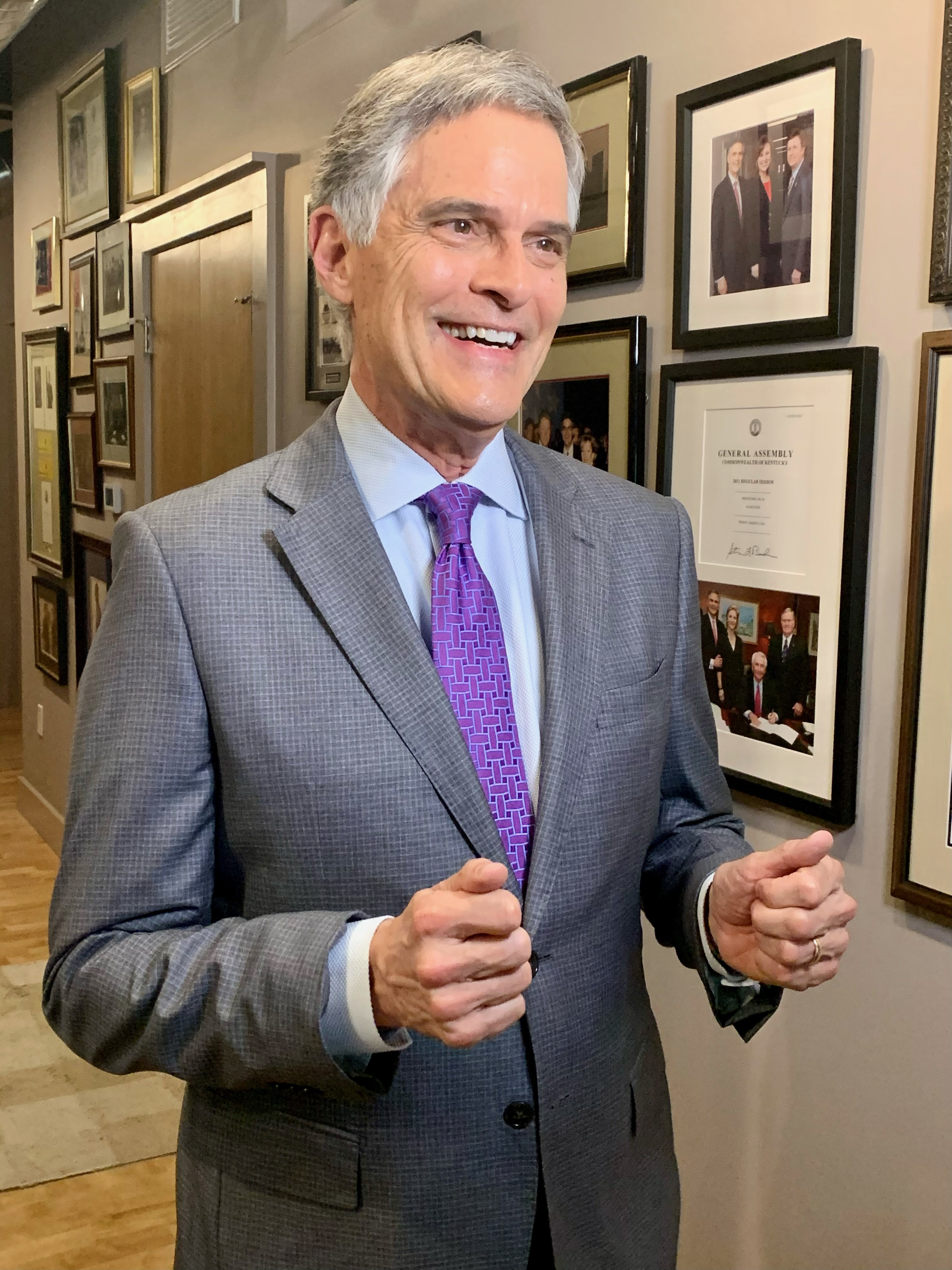
- Babbage in 2021

81st Secretary of State of Kentucky
- In office January 6, 1992 – January 1, 1996
- Governor: Brereton Jones; Paul E. Patton
- Preceded by: Bremer Ehrler
- Succeeded by: John Young Brown III

Kentucky Auditor of Public Accounts
- In office January 4, 1988 – January 6, 1992
- Governor: Wallace Wilkinson; Brereton Jones
- Preceded by: Mary Ann Tobin
- Succeeded by: Ben Chandler

Personal details
- Born: July 8, 1951 (age 74)
- Political party: Democratic

Bob Babbage (born July 8, 1951) is an American public leader, business and civic entrepreneur. Babbage is the leading lobbyist of Babbage Cofounder, a firm specializing in government relations and business strategies for public decisions. He was elected as Kentucky State Auditor and Kentucky Secretary of State.

On the federal level Babbage lobbied for the passage of the PNTR trade modernization with China and the $10.1 billion feature for agriculture in the American Jobs Creation Act of 2004. Both successes have had local as well as global impact.

Babbage served as Kentucky State Auditor (1988–1992) and Kentucky Secretary of State (1992–1996).

== Early life and education ==
Robert Alexander Babbage is the son of Robert and Judith Johnson Babbage and grandson of Kentucky Governor Keen Johnson (1939–1943). He has one brother, Dr. Keen J. Babbage, an educator and author.

He is a native of Lexington, Kentucky and graduate of Henry Clay High School. He graduated from Eastern Kentucky University in 1973 majoring in journalism and political science. He holds an MA from the University of Kentucky Patterson School of Diplomacy and International Commerce and an MA from Lexington Theological Seminary.

Babbage was assistant to the mayor of Lexington, Kentucky (1975–1976) and administrative assistant to Kentucky Governor Julian Carroll (1976–1979). Shortly thereafter he launched a career in financial management and insurance.

From 1984 to 1986 he was assistant to University of Kentucky President Otis Singletary. In 1988 he completed the Senior Executive Program at Harvard University. He received an honorary Doctorate in Public Administration from Campbellsville University in 1993.

Babbage teamed with Kentucky Chamber of Commerce president and chief executive officer Dave Adkisson for the program Leadership Kentucky. Babbage is also a co-founder of Lexington Forum.

== Politics ==
Babbage was first elected to public office in 1981 as Council Member At-Large to the Lexington-Fayette Urban County Government. At that time, he was the youngest person ever elected to an at-large seat on the council. As a member of the council from 1981 to 1987, Babbage was instrumental in developing Lexington's first-ever 911 emergency communications system.

He also served as Budget Chairman and started Lexington's Senior Interns Program.

In 1987, Babbage successfully ran for Kentucky State Auditor serving from 1988 to 1992. Prevented from seeking a second term by state law which at that time prohibited constitutional officers from succeeding themselves, he subsequently sought the office of Kentucky Secretary of State serving from 1992 to 1996.

During his tenure as auditor, Kentucky voters amended the state constitution to remove the restriction on lotteries which led to the establishment of the Kentucky Lottery Commission. Babbage established guidelines and procedures for routine audits of the Lottery. In 2014 the Kentucky Lottery had total sales of $858.8 million and provided $276.1 million in revenue to the state budget.

Also as State Auditor, Babbage ensured that all audits of county governments were at current-year-status, many having been far behind. Twice during his tenure as State Auditor, he was awarded the Governor's Affirmative Action Achievement Award for successfully recruiting minorities in state government.

As Secretary of State Babbage championed a "motor-voter law" that simplified the process for registering voters and maintaining registrations, was active in starting limited liability corporations for Kentucky business and conducted the nation's first online vote count in real time. He also proposed One-Stop business licensing through the Corporations Filing Office of the Office of Secretary of State.

He managed the Election Day Task Force with the state attorney general and the FBI. Babbage and the attorney general named a task force on vote fraud reform that proposed legislation that was successfully passed and implemented. He also founded and chaired Democracy, Inc., a voter registration and education foundation.

Babbage contested and lost a close primary race for Governor of Kentucky in 1995. Babbage's signature campaign proposal to establish a pool of funds to provide college tuition scholarships to all high school students graduating with above average grades and attending Kentucky colleges was later implemented by the state. Following the election, he was named state chair of the Kentucky Democratic Party by Governor Paul E. Patton.

Babbage was the working chair in 2000 of the bi-partisan committee to pass a constitutional amendment for annual sessions of the Kentucky General Assembly. The committee was chaired by the Republican Senate President and Democrat Speaker of the House. After previously failing three times over Kentucky's history, the amendment to establish a short session of the legislature in odd-numbered years passed 52.33% to 47.67%.

== Business and professional ==
Following tenures as Kentucky State Auditor and Kentucky Secretary of State, Babbage was vice president of the U.S. Corrections Corporation and a senior fellow at the Council of State Governments during the mid-1990s.

During that time, President Bill Clinton appointed him to the Coordinating Council on Juvenile Justice chaired by Attorney General Janet Reno and later by Attorney General John Ashcroft.

U. S. Secretary of State Colin Powell later named him to the Advisory Committee for Cultural Diplomacy.

In 1995 he re-branded InterSouth, Inc., formed in 1994, as Babbage Cofounder.

Party political offices
Preceded by Mary Ann Tobin	Democratic nominee for Kentucky Auditor of Public Accounts; 1987	Succeeded by Ben Chandler
Preceded by Bremer Ehrler	Democratic nominee for Secretary of State of Kentucky; 1991	Succeeded by John Young Brown III
Political offices
Preceded by Bremer Ehrler	Secretary of State of Kentucky; 1992–1996	Succeeded by John Young Brown III
