= Kentucky Auditor of Public Accounts =

Kentucky elected constitutional officer

Auditor of Public Accounts of Kentucky
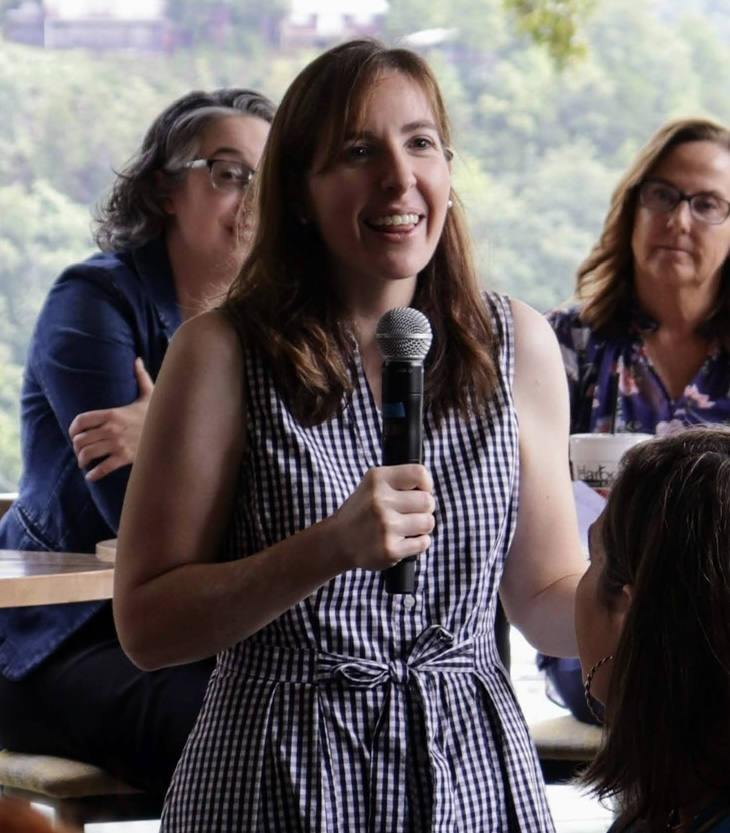
- Incumbent; Allison Ball since January 1, 2024
- Style: Mister or Madam Auditor (informal); The Honorable (formal)
- Seat: Kentucky State Capitol; Frankfort, Kentucky
- Appointer: General election
- Term length: Four years, no more than two terms consecutively
- Constituting instrument: Sections 91 and 93, Kentucky Constitution
- Inaugural holder: William McDowell
- Formation: June 22, 1792 (234 years ago)
- Succession: Fourth
- Salary: $129,375
- Website: Official website

The auditor of public accounts of Kentucky is an elected constitutional officer in the executive branch of the U.S. state of Kentucky. Forty-seven individuals have occupied the auditor's office since statehood. The incumbent is Allison Ball, a Republican.

== Powers and duties ==
The auditor of public accounts "...ensures that public resources are protected, accurately valued, properly accounted for, and effectively employed to raise the quality of life of Kentuckians." More specifically, the auditor of public accounts conducts an array of external audits which examine financial condition, legal compliance, information technology systems, and program performance in governmental entities. The auditor's scope of authority extends to all state agencies, every public or private entity that receives state funds, all state-owned or operated enterprises such as prisons and public works, and every county, municipality, and school district in the commonwealth.

== History ==
Initially, the auditor of public accounts served as a comptroller and tax collector for state government. The Reorganization Act of 1936 transferred those functions to other state agencies and established the auditor's office as "...an impartial agency entirely independent of state administration and charged with the responsibility of auditing the accounts and financial transactions of all Commonwealth spending agencies." Government auditing remains the primary function of the auditor's office to this day.

== List of auditors ==
No.	Image	Name	Term
1		William McDowell	1792–1796
2		George Madison	1796–1816
3		John Madison	1816–1820
4		Porter Clay	1820
5		Ben Shelby	1820–1834
6		Thomas Scudder Page	1834–1846
7		H. Q. Bradley	1846–1848
8		John Baylor Temple	1848–1850
9		James A. Barbour	1850–1851
9		Thomas Scudder Page	1851–1859
10		Grant Green	1859–1863
11		A. T. Samuels	1863–1867
12		D. Howard Smith	1867–1879
13		Fayette Hewitt	1879–1887
14		L. C. Norman	1887–1896
15		Samuel Hanson Stone	1896–1900
16		John S. Sweeney	1900
17		Gus G. Coulter	1900–1904
18		Samuel Wilber Hager	1904–1908
19		Frank P. Jones	1908–1912
20		Henry M. Bosworth	1912–1916
21		Robert L. Greene	1916–1919
22		T. M. Jones	1919–1920
23		John J. Craig	1920–1924
24		William H. Shanks	1924–1928
25		Clell Coleman	1928–1932
26		J. Dan Talbott	1932–1936
27		E. E. Shannon	1936–1940
28		David A. Logan	1940–1943
29		B. L. Sparks	1943–1947
30		Charles I. Ross	1947
31		W. D. Bratcher	1947–1948
32		Harry Newman Jones	1948–1952
33		T. Herbert Tinsley	1952–1956
34		Mary Louise Foust	1956–1960
35		Joseph W. Schneider	1960–1964
36		Henry H. Carter	1964–1968
37		Clyde Conley	1968–1969
38		James Thompson	1969–1970
39		Mary Louise Foust	1970–1976
40		George L. Atkins	1976–1980
41		James B. Graham	1980–1984
42		Mary Ann Tobin	1984–1988
43		Bob Babbage	1988–1992
44		Ben Chandler	1992–1996
45		Ed Hatchett	1996–2004
46		Crit Luallen	2004–2012
47		Adam Edelen	2012–2016
48		Mike Harmon	2016–2024
49		Allison Ball	2024–present
