= Billy Ray Smith (politician) =

American politician (1944–2026)

32nd Kentucky Commissioner of Agriculture
- In office January 1, 1996 – January 5, 2004
- Governor: Paul E. Patton; Ernie Fletcher
- Preceded by: Ed Logsdon
- Succeeded by: Richie Farmer

Member of the Kentucky House of Representatives from the 21st district
- In office January 1, 1982 – January 1, 1996
- Preceded by: Buddy Adams
- Succeeded by: Roger Thomas

Personal details
- Born: April 5, 1944
- Died: October 10, 2026 (aged 82)
- Party: Democratic
- Education: Western Kentucky University (BS)

William Ray Smith (April 5, 1944 – October 10, 2026) was an American farmer and politician from Kentucky. He served as a member of the Kentucky House of Representatives from 1982 to 1996 and as Kentucky Commissioner of Agriculture from 1996 to 2004. He was the first agriculture commissioner to be elected to two terms.

== Early life and education ==
William Ray Smith was born on April 5, 1944, to Leslie and Evelyn (Stahl) Smith. His family were multi-generational farmers and cattle breeders from Bowling Green. In 1965, he graduated from Western Kentucky University with a Bachelor of Science degree in agriculture.

== Career ==
After receiving his undergraduate degree, he worked for Pan American Mills, a grain elevator and livestock feed company.

In 1981, Smith was elected to the Kentucky House of Representatives after incumbent representative Buddy Adams chose not to seek reelection. He was elected agriculture commissioner in 1995 after incumbent commissioner Ed Logsdon chose to run for secretary of state. He was reelected in 1999 and term-limited in 2003.

== Personal life and death ==
Smith and his wife Sandra had four children together, and were married for fifty years prior to her passing in 2012. He later married Jane McLellan Thomas.

Smith died of cancer on October 10, 2026, at the age of 82.
