= Ed Hatchett =

American attorney and politician

Edward Hatchett

Auditor of Kentucky
- In office January 1, 1996 – January 5, 2004
- Governor: Paul Patton; Ernie Fletcher
- Preceded by: Ben Chandler
- Succeeded by: Crit Luallen

Personal details
- Political party: Democratic
- Education: Centre College; University of Louisville (JD)
- Profession: Attorney

Edward "Ed" Hatchett is an American attorney and politician from Glasgow, Kentucky. A Democrat, Hatchett was the elected State Auditor in Kentucky from 1996 to 2004.

== Early life and education ==
Hatchett received his bachelor's degree from Centre College and Juris Doctor from the University of Louisville.

== Career ==
Hatchett began practicing law in 1977. From 1977 to 1988 he was vice president, trust and investment officer and secretary of New Farmers National Bank of Glasgow. Hatchett has held various appointed positions in associated with Kentucky state government including, Kentucky Commissioner of Financial Institutions and Kentucky securities administrator.

Hatchett was elected Auditor of Public Accounts in Kentucky in 1995 and re-elected in 1999.

Currently, Hatchett practices law as managing partner for Blue Spring Creek, LLC.

=== Professional experience ===
Hatchett has had the following professional experience:

- Real Estate Broker, Hatchett Real Estate and Auction, 1977–present
- Auctioneer, Hatchett Auction, 1976–present
- President, United States Slag and ReClamation, 1978–1979
- Assistant Cashier, Bank of Marshall Company, 1971–1976

== Personal life ==
Hatchett is currently married with three children; as well as two grandchildren.

Hatchett practices the religion of Christianity.

Party political offices
Preceded by Ben Chandler	Democratic nominee for Kentucky Auditor of Public Accounts; 1995, 1999	Succeeded by Crit Luallen
