= John Young Brown III =

American politician (born 1963)

82nd Secretary of State of Kentucky
- In office January 1, 1996 – January 4, 2004
- Governor: Paul Patton; Ernie Fletcher
- Preceded by: Bob Babbage
- Succeeded by: Trey Grayson

Personal details
- Born: June 2, 1963 (age 63) Louisville, Kentucky, U.S.
- Party: Democratic
- Spouse: Rebecca Jackson
- Children: 2
- Parent(s): John Y. Brown Jr. Eleanor Durall
- Relatives: John Y. Brown Sr. (grandfather); Pamela Brown (half-sister)
- Education: Bellarmine University (BA, MBA); University of Kentucky (JD)
- Profession: Lawyer; Politician

John Young Brown III (born June 2, 1963) is an American politician from the Commonwealth of Kentucky. Brown served as Secretary of State of Kentucky from 1996 to 2004. In 2007, Brown ran unsuccessfully for the Democratic nomination for Lieutenant Governor of Kentucky as the running mate of gubernatorial candidate Jody Richards, the Speaker of the Kentucky House of Representatives.

== Biography ==
Brown was born in Louisville, Kentucky. He is the son of John Y. Brown Jr., a former Governor of Kentucky and KFC magnate, and he is the grandson of former state legislator and United States Congressman John Y. Brown Sr. Brown is also the half-brother of television reporter Pamela Brown.

Brown graduated from Kentucky's public school system. He received a B.A. degree (magna cum laude) and an M.B.A. from Bellarmine College. He earned his J.D. degree from the University of Kentucky College of Law.

In 1991, he married Rebecca J. Brown, an Oldham County native. They have a son and a daughter. His son, John Y. Brown IV, earned his Juris doctor degree from the University of Kentucky College of Law in 2021, and is a registered Republican.

Party political offices
Preceded by Bob Babbage	Democratic nominee for Secretary of State of Kentucky; 1995, 1999	Succeeded by Russ Maple
Political offices
Preceded by Bob Babbage	Kentucky Secretary of State; 1996–2004	Succeeded by Trey Grayson
