= Ben Chandler =

American politician (born 1959)

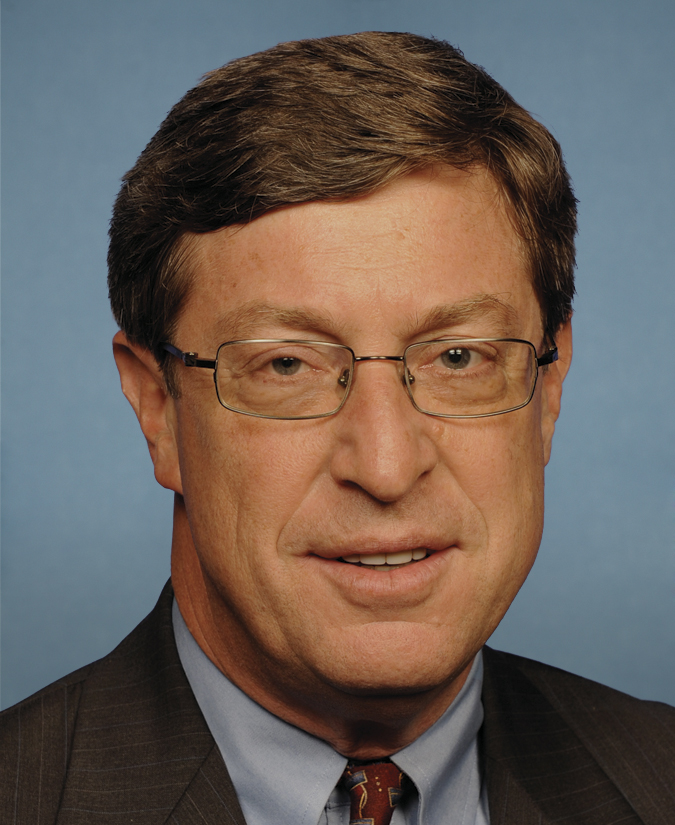

Member of the U.S. House of Representatives from Kentucky's 6th district
- In office February 17, 2004 – January 3, 2013 (Note: Chandler's official service begins on the date of the special election, while he was not sworn in until February 24, 2004.)
- Preceded by: Ernie Fletcher
- Succeeded by: Andy Barr

47th Attorney General of Kentucky
- In office January 1, 1996 – January 5, 2004
- Governor: Paul Patton; Ernie Fletcher
- Preceded by: Chris Gorman
- Succeeded by: Greg Stumbo

Auditor of Kentucky
- In office January 6, 1992 – January 1, 1996
- Governor: Brereton Jones; Paul Patton
- Preceded by: Bob Babbage
- Succeeded by: Ed Hatchett

Personal details
- Born: Albert Benjamin Chandler III; September 12, 1959 (age 66) Versailles, Kentucky, U.S.
- Party: Democratic
- Spouse: Jennifer Romine
- Relatives: Happy Chandler (grandfather) Mimi Chandler (aunt)
- Education: University of Kentucky (BA, JD)

Albert Benjamin Chandler III (born September 12, 1959) is an American lawyer and politician who served as the United States representative for Kentucky's 6th congressional district from 2004 to 2013. A member of the Democratic Party, and the grandson of two-time Kentucky Governor Happy Chandler, he was the nominee of his party for Governor in 2003, losing by just over 10 points to Republican Ernie Fletcher, He was then elected to Congress in a 2004 special election. He served until January 2013, having been defeated for re-election by Andy Barr in the 2012 elections. He was also the Attorney General of Kentucky from 1996 until 2004.

== Early life, education and career ==
Chandler was born in Versailles, Kentucky on September 12, 1959, the son of Lucie "Toss" (née Dunlap) and A. B. (Ben) Chandler Jr. His paternal grandfather, A. B. (Happy) Chandler, served as governor of Kentucky and commissioner of baseball, and as a U.S. senator.

Chandler graduated with distinction from the University of Kentucky with a BA in History and a J.D. from the University of Kentucky College of Law. Chandler became a lawyer in private practice in Lexington, KY before starting his political career.

== Early political career ==
Chandler started his political career as State Auditor (per the Constitution of the Commonwealth, officially called the "Auditor of Public Accounts") from 1992 through 1995. In 1995, Chandler won the Attorney General of Kentucky race by a 20-point margin, making him the nation's youngest attorney general at the time. In 1999, Chandler was elected to a second term as attorney general with no opposition.

As attorney general, Chandler championed Kentucky's "No Call" list and collected thousands of dollars in fines to the state for companies that did not comply with the new law. Chandler also strengthened federal laws regarding the "No Call" registry.

Also during his time as attorney general, Chandler recovered $45 million in charitable assets from one of Kentucky's largest insurance companies when it converted from non-profit to for-profit status. This $45 million provided the endowment for the Foundation for a Healthy Kentucky, which many years later Chandler headed.

== U.S. House of Representatives ==
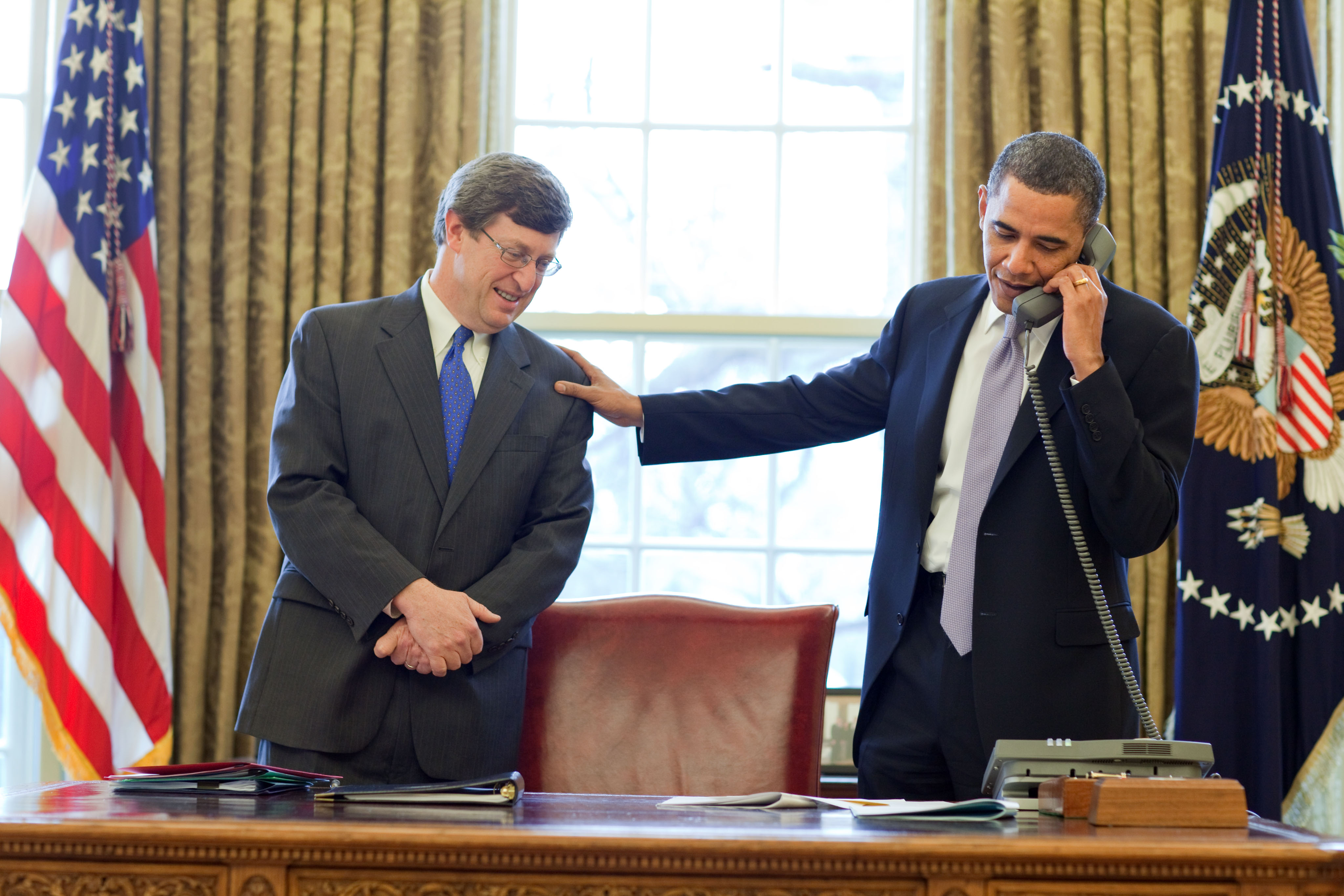
Congressman Chandler with Barack Obama

Chandler represented the Sixth Congressional District of Kentucky in the United States House of Representatives since a special election in 2004 until 2013. Although Chandler is a Democrat, the Sixth Congressional District leans Republican, rated by Charlie Cook in his Cook Partisan Voting Index as "R + 9," meaning a generic Republican running against a generic Democrat would win by 9 points more than he would nationally.

He is a moderate to conservative Democrat, and in its 2010 vote rankings, National Journal rated Chandler as being the ideological center of the House of Representatives. Although Chandler is a Democrat and has supported many Democratic bills including supporting healthcare for children through the SCHIP law and the Recovery Act, he has also voted against some large pieces of Democratic-led legislation including the Wall Street Bailout and the Affordable Care Act.

Chandler was a member of the Blue Dog Coalition, a fiscally conservative Democratic caucus. This caucus is generally composed of Democrats serving Republican leaning congressional districts. He served as the chair of the national Blue Dog Task Force on Oversight and Regulatory Review. According to the website, this taskforce "The Task Force on Oversight and Regulatory Review is responsible for taking a look at the nearly 8,000 regulations issued annually by the federal government and for analyzing these new rules to ensure Congressional intent is appropriately followed. Under the leadership of Chair Ben Chandler (KY-06) and Vice-Chair Tim Holden (PA-17), the Task Force monitors implementation efforts, identifies overly burdensome regulations and seeks to modify rules problematic to job creation."

Chandler has voted in favor of the American Recovery and Reinvestment Act of 2009, the American Clean Energy and Security Act of 2009, against the Dodd–Frank Wall Street Reform and Consumer Protection Act and the Troubled Asset Relief Program, against the Patient Protection and Affordable Care Act, against Cut, Cap and Balance Act and for funding the State Children's Health Insurance Program.

In 2010 Chandler was criticized for accepting campaign contributions from embattled Congressman Rep. Charles Rangel's National Leadership PAC.

In September 2010, Kentucky.com reported that Chandler was one of several "moderate Democrats facing tough re-election bids who are bucking the Obama administration and pushing to extend tax cuts at every income level."

In 2011, Chandler voted for the National Defense Authorization Act for Fiscal Year 2012 as part of a controversial provision that allows the government and the military to indefinitely detain American citizens and others without trial.

Taxes

Chandler is a signer of Americans for Tax Reform's Taxpayer Protection Pledge.

=== Committee assignments ===
Before being appointed to the Intelligence Committee, Chandler served on the Appropriations Committee.

- Committee on Foreign Affairs
  - Subcommittee on the Middle East and South Asia
- Permanent Select Committee on Intelligence
  - Subcommittee on Technical and Tactical Intelligence

=== Caucus memberships ===
A full list of Chandler's caucus memberships can be found here: Caucus Membership | Congressman Ben Chandler, Representing the 6th District of Kentucky

- Healthy Forests Caucus
- Horse Caucus (Co-chair)
- International Conservation Caucus (Co-chair)
- Public Broadcasting Caucus (Co-chair)
- Wildlife Refuge Caucus

Chandler was a Blue Dog Democrat as well as a member of the House New Democrat Coalition. His name had been rumored as a candidate for governor for the 2007 election and Senator in the 2008 election. Chandler, however, announced on November 30, 2006, that he would not seek the governorship in 2007, stating he could better serve the Commonwealth in Congress: "With rising seniority and a Democratic majority, I have the opportunity to do so much more for my constituents and for the people of Kentucky." Chandler told "Kentucky Newsmakers" that he would not start holding so-called town hall meetings in 2009, citing a lack of "civility" at forums regarding health care. Chandler ultimately voted against the Patient Protection and Affordable Care Act.

== Political campaigns ==
Chandler was the Democratic candidate for governor in the election of 2003. He was defeated in that election in the landslide by his Republican opponent, Congressman Ernie Fletcher. Fletcher resigned from Congress in order to become governor, and a special election was held for his seat in February 2004. Chandler became the Democratic candidate and won the election, defeating state Senator Alice Forgy Kerr by a 55% to 43% margin.

As a superdelegate in the 2008 United States presidential election, Chandler endorsed Barack Obama. Chandler's 2008 Republican opponent in the race for Congress was attorney Jon Larson.

=== 2010 ===
Chandler was challenged by Republican nominee Andy Barr in the November 2010 election. Chandler was elected by a very narrow margin, as results showed him leading Barr by about 600 votes. The results were re-canvassed due to the closeness of the outcome, but Chandler was certified as the election winner on November 12, 2010, by 648 votes.

In October 2011, Barr called their forthcoming contest "a rematch of the third-closest Congressional race in America" and said that Chandler was burdened with "considerable dissatisfaction" on the part of his constituents and the difficulty of running on the ticket with Obama. But Joshua Miller of Roll Call observed that "if the bent of the GOP-leaning district grows more Democratic and Democrats who sat out 2010 come to the polls next November, Barr has a steep hill to climb."

=== 2012 ===
Chandler was again challenged by Barr. Randolph S. Vance ran as a write-in candidate. Barr defeated Chandler in the election, 50.6% to 46.7%.

== Post-congressional career ==
Chandler did not run for Governor in 2015, though he has hinted that he might run for office again in the future.

From 2013 to 2016, Chandler served as executive director of the Kentucky Humanities Council. From 2016 to 2024, he was CEO of the Foundation for a Healthy Kentucky. He is a member of the ReFormers Caucus of Issue One and has served as publisher of The Woodford Sun since 2022.

== See also ==
- Politics of Kentucky

Party political offices
Preceded by Bob Babbage	Democratic nominee for Auditor of Kentucky; 1991	Succeeded by Ed Hatchett
Preceded by Chris Gorman	Democratic nominee for Attorney General of Kentucky; 1995, 1999	Succeeded by Paul Patton
Preceded by Paul Patton	Democratic nominee for Governor of Kentucky; 2003	Succeeded by Steve Beshear
Legal offices
Preceded by Chris Gorman	Attorney General of Kentucky; 1996–2004	Succeeded by Greg Stumbo
U.S. House of Representatives
Preceded by Ernie Fletcher	Member of the U.S. House of Representatives from Kentucky's 6th congressional district 2004–2013	Succeeded by Andy Barr
U.S. order of precedence (ceremonial)
Preceded by Carl C. Perkins as Former U.S. Representative	Order of precedence of the United States as Former U.S. Representative	Succeeded by Bill Boner as Former U.S. Representative
