= Political party strength in Kentucky =

Politics in the US state of Kentucky

The following table indicates the party of elected officials in the U.S. state of Kentucky:

- Governor
- Lieutenant Governor
- Secretary of State
- Attorney General
- State Treasurer
- Auditor of Public Accounts
- Agriculture Commissioner

The table also indicates the historical party composition in the:

- State Senate
- State House of Representatives
- State delegation to the United States Senate
- State delegation to the United States House of Representatives

For years in which a presidential election was held, the table indicates which party's nominees received the state's electoral votes.

== 1792–1851 ==
Year	Executive offices					General Assembly		United States Congress			Electoral votes
Year	Governor	Lt. Governor	Sec. of State	Attorney General	Treasurer	State Senate	State House	U.S. Senator (Class II)	U.S. Senator (Class III)	U.S. House	Electoral votes
1792	Isaac Shelby (DR)	no such office	James Brown (DR)	George Nicholas (F)	John Logan	DR majority	DR majority	John Brown (AA)	John Edwards (AA)	2AA	Washington/ Jefferson (Note: Kentucky's representatives voted for President Washington and Secretary of State Jefferson in the electoral college.) (I) ✓
1793	Isaac Shelby (DR)	no such office	James Brown (DR)	John Breckinridge (DR)	John Logan	DR majority	DR majority	John Brown (AA)	John Edwards (AA)	2AA	Washington/ Jefferson (I) ✓
1794	Isaac Shelby (DR)	no such office	James Brown (DR)	John Breckinridge (DR)	John Logan	DR majority	DR majority	John Brown (AA)	John Edwards (AA)	2AA	Washington/ Jefferson (I) ✓
1795	Isaac Shelby (DR)	no such office	James Brown (DR)	John Breckinridge (DR)	John Logan	DR majority	DR majority	John Brown (DR)	Humphrey Marshall (F)	2DR	Washington/ Jefferson (I) ✓
1796	Isaac Shelby (DR)	no such office	James Brown (DR)	John Breckinridge (DR)	John Logan	DR majority	DR majority	John Brown (DR)	Humphrey Marshall (F)	2DR	Jefferson/ Burr (DR) ✗
1797	James Garrard (DR)	no such office	Harry Toulmin (DR)	James Blair (DR)	John Logan	DR majority	DR majority	John Brown (DR)	Humphrey Marshall (F)	2DR	Jefferson/ Burr (DR) ✗
1798	James Garrard (DR)	no such office	Harry Toulmin (DR)	James Blair (DR)	John Logan	DR majority	DR majority	John Brown (DR)	Humphrey Marshall (F)	2DR	Jefferson/ Burr (DR) ✗
1799	James Garrard (DR)	no such office	Harry Toulmin (DR)	James Blair (DR)	John Logan	DR majority	DR majority	John Brown (DR)	Humphrey Marshall (F)	2DR	Jefferson/ Burr (DR) ✗
1800	James Garrard (DR)	no such office	Harry Toulmin (DR)	James Blair (DR)	John Logan	DR majority	DR majority	John Brown (DR)	Humphrey Marshall (F)	2DR	Jefferson/ Burr (DR) ✓
1801	James Garrard (DR)	Alexander Scott Bullitt (DR)	Harry Toulmin (DR)	James Blair (DR)	John Logan	DR majority	DR majority	John Brown (DR)	John Breckinridge (DR) (Note: Resigned to take office as United States Attorney General.)	2DR	Jefferson/ Burr (DR) ✓
1802	James Garrard (DR)	Alexander Scott Bullitt (DR)	Harry Toulmin (DR)	James Blair (DR)	John Logan	DR majority	DR majority	John Brown (DR)	John Breckinridge (DR)	2DR	Jefferson/ Burr (DR) ✓
1803	James Garrard (DR)	Alexander Scott Bullitt (DR)	Harry Toulmin (DR)	James Blair (DR)	John Logan	DR majority	DR majority	John Brown (DR)	John Breckinridge (DR)	6DR	Jefferson/ Burr (DR) ✓
1804	James Garrard (DR)	Alexander Scott Bullitt (DR)	Harry Toulmin (DR)	James Blair (DR)	John Logan	DR majority	DR majority	John Brown (DR)	John Breckinridge (DR)	6DR	Jefferson/ Clinton (DR) ✓
1805	Christopher Greenup (DR)	John Caldwell (DR) (Note: Died in office.)	John Rowan (DR)	James Blair (DR)	John Logan	DR majority	DR majority	Buckner Thruston (DR)	John Breckinridge (DR)	6DR	Jefferson/ Clinton (DR) ✓
1805	Christopher Greenup (DR)	vacant	John Rowan (DR)	James Blair (DR)	John Logan	DR majority	DR majority	Buckner Thruston (DR)	John Adair (DR)	6DR	Jefferson/ Clinton (DR) ✓
1806	Christopher Greenup (DR)	Thomas Posey (DR)	John Rowan (DR)	James Blair (DR)	John Logan	DR majority	DR majority	Buckner Thruston (DR)	John Adair (DR)	6DR	Jefferson/ Clinton (DR) ✓
1807	Christopher Greenup (DR)	Thomas Posey (DR)	John Rowan (DR)	James Blair (DR)	John Logan	DR majority	DR majority	Buckner Thruston (DR)	Henry Clay (DR)	6DR	Jefferson/ Clinton (DR) ✓
1807	Christopher Greenup (DR)	Thomas Posey (DR)	Alfred W. Grayson	James Blair (DR)	David Logan	DR majority	DR majority	Buckner Thruston (DR)	John Pope (DR)	6DR	Jefferson/ Clinton (DR) ✓
1808	Christopher Greenup (DR)	Thomas Posey (DR)	William C. Greenup	James Blair (DR)	David Logan	DR majority	DR majority	Buckner Thruston (DR)	John Pope (DR)	6DR	Madison/ Clinton (DR) ✓
1809	Charles Scott (DR)	Gabriel Slaughter (DR)	Jesse Bledsoe (DR)	James Blair (DR)	John P. Thomas	DR majority	DR majority	Buckner Thruston (DR)	John Pope (DR)	6DR	Madison/ Clinton (DR) ✓
1810	Charles Scott (DR)	Gabriel Slaughter (DR)	Jesse Bledsoe (DR)	James Blair (DR)	John P. Thomas	DR majority	DR majority	Henry Clay (DR)	John Pope (DR)	6DR	Madison/ Clinton (DR) ✓
1811	Charles Scott (DR)	Gabriel Slaughter (DR)	Jesse Bledsoe (DR)	James Blair (DR)	John P. Thomas	DR majority	DR majority	George M. Bibb (DR)	John Pope (DR)	6DR	Madison/ Clinton (DR) ✓
1812	Charles Scott (DR)	Gabriel Slaughter (DR)	Fielding Whitlock	James Blair (DR)	John P. Thomas	DR majority	DR majority	George M. Bibb (DR)	John Pope (DR)	6DR	Madison/ Gerry (DR) ✓
1812	Isaac Shelby (DR)	Richard Hickman (DR)	Martin D. Hardin (DR)	James Blair (DR)	John P. Thomas	DR majority	DR majority	George M. Bibb (DR)	John Pope (DR)	6DR	Madison/ Gerry (DR) ✓
1813	Isaac Shelby (DR)	Richard Hickman (DR)	Christopher Greenup (DR)	James Blair (DR)	John P. Thomas	DR majority	DR majority	George M. Bibb (DR)	Jesse Bledsoe (DR)	10DR	Madison/ Gerry (DR) ✓
1813	Isaac Shelby (DR)	Richard Hickman (DR)	Martin D. Hardin (DR)	James Blair (DR)	John P. Thomas	DR majority	DR majority	George M. Bibb (DR)	Jesse Bledsoe (DR)	10DR	Madison/ Gerry (DR) ✓
1814	Isaac Shelby (DR)	Richard Hickman (DR)	Martin D. Hardin (DR)	James Blair (DR)	John P. Thomas	DR majority	DR majority	George M. Bibb (DR)	Jesse Bledsoe (DR)	10DR	Madison/ Gerry (DR) ✓
1814	Isaac Shelby (DR)	Richard Hickman (DR)	Martin D. Hardin (DR)	James Blair (DR)	John P. Thomas	DR majority	DR majority	George Walker (DR)	Jesse Bledsoe (DR)	10DR	Madison/ Gerry (DR) ✓
1815	Isaac Shelby (DR)	Richard Hickman (DR)	Martin D. Hardin (DR)	James Blair (DR)	John P. Thomas	DR majority	DR majority	William T. Barry (DR)	Isham Talbot (DR)	10DR	Madison/ Gerry (DR) ✓
1816	Isaac Shelby (DR)	Richard Hickman (DR)	Martin D. Hardin (DR)	James Blair (DR)	John P. Thomas	DR majority	DR majority	William T. Barry (DR)	Isham Talbot (DR)	10DR	Monroe/ Tompkins (DR) ✓
1816	George Madison (DR)	Gabriel Slaughter (DR)	Charles Stewart Todd (DR)	James Blair (DR)	John P. Thomas	DR majority	DR majority	William T. Barry (DR)	Isham Talbot (DR)	10DR	Monroe/ Tompkins (DR) ✓
1816	Gabriel Slaughter (DR) (Note: As lieutenant governor, filled unexpired term.)	vacant	John Pope (DR)	James Blair (DR)	John P. Thomas	DR majority	DR majority	Martin D. Hardin (DR)	Isham Talbot (DR)	10DR	Monroe/ Tompkins (DR) ✓
1817	Gabriel Slaughter (DR)	vacant	John Pope (DR)	James Blair (DR)	John P. Thomas	DR majority	DR majority	John J. Crittenden (DR)	Isham Talbot (DR)	10DR	Monroe/ Tompkins (DR) ✓
1818	Gabriel Slaughter (DR)	vacant	John Pope (DR)	James Blair (DR)	John P. Thomas	DR majority	DR majority	John J. Crittenden (DR)	Isham Talbot (DR)	10DR	Monroe/ Tompkins (DR) ✓
1819	Gabriel Slaughter (DR)	vacant	John Pope (DR)	James Blair (DR)	Samuel South	DR majority	DR majority	Richard Mentor Johnson (DR)	William Logan (DR)	10DR	Monroe/ Tompkins (DR) ✓
1820	Gabriel Slaughter (DR)	vacant	Oliver G. Waggener	Joseph M. White (DR)	Samuel South	DR majority	DR majority	Richard Mentor Johnson (DR)	William Logan (DR)	10DR	Monroe/ Tompkins (DR) ✓
1820	Gabriel Slaughter (DR)	vacant	Oliver G. Waggener	Benjamin Hardin (DR)	Samuel South	DR majority	DR majority	Richard Mentor Johnson (DR)	Isham Talbot (DR)	10DR	Monroe/ Tompkins (DR) ✓
1821	John Adair (DR)	William T. Barry (DR)	Cabell Breckinridge (DR)	Solomon P. Sharp (DR)	Samuel South	DR majority	DR majority	Richard Mentor Johnson (DR)	Isham Talbot (DR)	10DR	Monroe/ Tompkins (DR) ✓
1822	John Adair (DR)	William T. Barry (DR)	Cabell Breckinridge (DR)	Solomon P. Sharp (DR)	Samuel South	DR majority	DR majority	Richard Mentor Johnson (DR)	Isham Talbot (DR)	10DR	Monroe/ Tompkins (DR) ✓
1823	John Adair (DR)	William T. Barry (DR)	Cabell Breckinridge (DR)	Solomon P. Sharp (DR)	Samuel South	DR majority	DR majority	Richard Mentor Johnson (DR)	Isham Talbot (DR)	12DR (8A-C, 4J)	Monroe/ Tompkins (DR) ✓
1824	John Adair (DR)	William T. Barry (DR)	Thomas Bell Monroe (DR)	Solomon P. Sharp (DR)	Samuel South	DR majority	DR majority	Richard Mentor Johnson (DR)	Isham Talbot (DR)	12DR (8A-C, 4J)	Clay/ Sanford (DR) ✗
1825	Joseph Desha (DR)	Robert B. McAfee (DR)	William T. Barry (DR)	Frederick W. S. Grayson (J)	James Davidson	DR majority	DR majority	Richard Mentor Johnson (J)	John Rowan (J)	7NR, 5J	Clay/ Sanford (DR) ✗
1825	Joseph Desha (DR)	Robert B. McAfee (DR)	James C. Pickett (DR)	James W. Denny (J)	James Davidson	DR majority	DR majority	Richard Mentor Johnson (J)	John Rowan (J)	7NR, 5J	Clay/ Sanford (DR) ✗
1826	Joseph Desha (DR)	Robert B. McAfee (DR)	James C. Pickett (DR)	James W. Denny (J)	James Davidson	21NC, 17OC	62OC, 38NC	Richard Mentor Johnson (J)	John Rowan (J)	8NR, 4J	Clay/ Sanford (DR) ✗
1827	Joseph Desha (DR)	Robert B. McAfee (DR)	James C. Pickett (DR)	James W. Denny (J)	James Davidson	22OC, 16NC	56OC, 44NC	Richard Mentor Johnson (J)	John Rowan (J)	7J, 5NR	Clay/ Sanford (DR) ✗
1828	Joseph Desha (DR)	Robert B. McAfee (DR)	George Robertson (DR)	James W. Denny (J)	James Davidson	20NR, 18D	54NR, 46D	Richard Mentor Johnson (J)	John Rowan (J)	8J, 4NR	Jackson/ Calhoun (D) ✓
1829	Thomas Metcalfe (NR)	John Breathitt (D)	Thomas T. Crittenden	James W. Denny (J)	James Davidson	22NR, 16D	57D, 42NR, 1?	George M. Bibb (J)	John Rowan (J)	10J, 2NR	Jackson/ Calhoun (D) ✓
1830	Thomas Metcalfe (NR)	John Breathitt (D)	Thomas T. Crittenden	James W. Denny (J)	James Davidson	24NR, 14D	64NR, 36D	George M. Bibb (J)	John Rowan (J)	10J, 2NR	Jackson/ Calhoun (D) ✓
1831	Thomas Metcalfe (NR)	John Breathitt (D)	Thomas T. Crittenden	James W. Denny (J)	James Davidson	20NR, 18D	55NR, 44D, 1 tie	George M. Bibb (J)	Henry Clay (NR)	8J, 4NR	Jackson/ Calhoun (D) ✓
1832	Thomas Metcalfe (NR)	John Breathitt (D)	John F. McCurdy	James W. Denny (J)	James Davidson	20D, 18NR	52NR, 48D	George M. Bibb (J)	Henry Clay (NR)	8J, 4NR	Clay/ Sergeant (NR) ✗
1833	John Breathitt (D)	James T. Morehead (NR)	Lewis Sanders	Charles S. Morehead (NR)	James Davidson	22NR, 16D	60NR, 40D	George M. Bibb (J)	Henry Clay (NR)	9NR, 4J	Clay/ Sergeant (NR) ✗
1834	John Breathitt (D)	James T. Morehead (NR)	Lewis Sanders	Charles S. Morehead (NR)	James Davidson	20D, 18NR	60NR, 40D	George M. Bibb (J)	Henry Clay (NR)	9NR, 4J	Clay/ Sergeant (NR) ✗
1834	James T. Morehead (NR)	vacant	John J. Crittenden (NR) (Note: Resigned to take an elected seat in the United States Senate.)	Charles S. Morehead (NR)	James Davidson	20D, 18NR	60NR, 40D	George M. Bibb (J)	Henry Clay (NR)	9NR, 4J	Clay/ Sergeant (NR) ✗
1835	James T. Morehead (NR)	vacant	William Owsley (NR)	Charles S. Morehead (NR)	James Davidson	21W, 17D	75W, 25D	John J. Crittenden (NR)	Henry Clay (NR)	9NR, 4J	Clay/ Sergeant (NR) ✗
1836	James T. Morehead (NR)	vacant	Austin P. Cox	Charles S. Morehead (NR)	James Davidson	23W, 15D	63W, 37D	John J. Crittenden (NR)	Henry Clay (NR)	9NR, 4J	Harrison/ Granger (W) ✗
1837	James Clark (W)	Charles A. Wickliffe (W)	James M. Bullock	Charles S. Morehead (NR)	James Davidson	24W, 14D	58W, 42D	John J. Crittenden (W)	Henry Clay (W)	12W, 1D	Harrison/ Granger (W) ✗
1838	James Clark (W)	Charles A. Wickliffe (W)	James M. Bullock	Owen G. Cotes (D)	James Davidson	24W, 14D	71W, 29D	John J. Crittenden (W)	Henry Clay (W)	12W, 1D	Harrison/ Granger (W) ✗
1839	James Clark (W)	Charles A. Wickliffe (W)	James M. Bullock	Owen G. Cotes (D)	James Davidson	22W, 16D	68W, 32D	John J. Crittenden (W)	Henry Clay (W)	11W, 2D	Harrison/ Granger (W) ✗
1839	Charles A. Wickliffe (W)	vacant	James M. Bullock	Owen G. Cotes (D)	James Davidson	22W, 16D	68W, 32D	John J. Crittenden (W)	Henry Clay (W)	11W, 2D	Harrison/ Granger (W) ✗
1840	Charles A. Wickliffe (W)	vacant	James M. Bullock	Owen G. Cotes (D)	James Davidson	22W, 16D	60W, 38D, 2?	John J. Crittenden (W)	Henry Clay (W)	11W, 2D	Harrison/ Tyler (W) ✓
1841	Robert P. Letcher (W)	Manlius Valerius Thomson (W)	James Harlan (W)	Owen G. Cotes (D)	James Davidson	24W, 14D	76W, 24D	James T. Morehead (W)	Henry Clay (W)	11W, 2D	Harrison/ Tyler (W) ✓
1842	Robert P. Letcher (W)	Manlius Valerius Thomson (W)	James Harlan (W)	Owen G. Cotes (D)	James Davidson	27W, 11D	77W, 23D	James T. Morehead (W)	Henry Clay (W)	11W, 2D	Harrison/ Tyler (W) ✓
1842	Robert P. Letcher (W)	Manlius Valerius Thomson (W)	James Harlan (W)	Owen G. Cotes (D)	James Davidson	27W, 11D	77W, 23D	James T. Morehead (W)	John J. Crittenden (W) (Note: Resigned to take office as Governor of Kentucky.)	11W, 2D	Harrison/ Tyler (W) ✓
1843	Robert P. Letcher (W)	Manlius Valerius Thomson (W)	James Harlan (W)	Owen G. Cotes (D)	James Davidson	29W, 9D	57W, 43D	James T. Morehead (W)	John J. Crittenden (W)	5D, 5W	Harrison/ Tyler (W) ✓
1844	Robert P. Letcher (W)	Manlius Valerius Thomson (W)	James Harlan (W)	Owen G. Cotes (D)	James Davidson	26W, 12D	62W, 38D	James T. Morehead (W)	John J. Crittenden (W)	5D, 5W	Clay/ Frelinghuysen (W) ✗
1845	William Owsley (W)	Archibald Dixon (W)	Benjamin Hardin (W)	Owen G. Cotes (D)	James Davidson	26W, 12D	64W, 35D, 1?	James T. Morehead (W)	John J. Crittenden (W)	7W, 3D	Clay/ Frelinghuysen (W) ✗
1846	William Owsley (W)	Archibald Dixon (W)	Benjamin Hardin (W)	Owen G. Cotes (D)	James Davidson	24W, 14D	62W, 38D	James T. Morehead (W)	John J. Crittenden (W)	7W, 3D	Clay/ Frelinghuysen (W) ✗
1847	William Owsley (W)	Archibald Dixon (W)	George B. Kinkead (W)	Owen G. Cotes (D)	James Davidson	26W, 12D	63W, 37D	Joseph R. Underwood (W)	John J. Crittenden (W)	6W, 4D	Clay/ Frelinghuysen (W) ✗
1848	William Owsley (W)	Archibald Dixon (W)	George B. Kinkead (W)	Owen G. Cotes (D)	James Davidson	27W, 11D	59W, 41D	Joseph R. Underwood (W)	John J. Crittenden (W)	6W, 4D	Taylor/ Fillmore (W) ✓
1848	William Owsley (W)	Archibald Dixon (W)	William Decatur Reed (W)	Owen G. Cotes (D)	James Davidson	27W, 11D	59W, 41D	Joseph R. Underwood (W)	Thomas Metcalfe (W)	6W, 4D	Taylor/ Fillmore (W) ✓
1849	John J. Crittenden (W)	John L. Helm (W)	Orlando Brown (W)	M. Conyers Johnson (D)	Richard Curd; Wintersmith	27W, 11D	64W, 36D	Joseph R. Underwood (W)	Henry Clay (W)	6W, 4D	Taylor/ Fillmore (W) ✓
1850	John J. Crittenden (W)	John L. Helm (W)	Joshua Fry Bell (W)	M. Conyers Johnson (D)	Richard Curd; Wintersmith	27W, 11D	59W, 41D	Joseph R. Underwood (W)	Henry Clay (W)	6W, 4D	Taylor/ Fillmore (W) ✓
1850	John L. Helm (W)	vacant	John William Finnell (W)	M. Conyers Johnson (D)	Richard Curd; Wintersmith	27W, 11D	59W, 41D	Joseph R. Underwood (W)	Henry Clay (W)	6W, 4D	Taylor/ Fillmore (W) ✓
1851	John L. Helm (W)	vacant	John William Finnell (W)	M. Conyers Johnson (D)	Richard Curd; Wintersmith	23W, 15D	57W, 43D	Joseph R. Underwood (W)	Henry Clay (W)	5D, 5W	Taylor/ Fillmore (W) ✓

== 1852–present ==
Year	Executive offices							General Assembly		United States Congress			Electoral votes
Year	Governor	Lt. Governor	Sec. of State	Attorney General	Treasurer	Auditor	Ag. Comm.	State Senate	State House	U.S. Senator (Class II)	U.S. Senator (Class III)	U.S. House	Electoral votes
1852	Lazarus Powell (D)	John Burton Thompson (W)	David Meriwether (D)	James Harlan (W)	Richard Curd Wintersmith	Thomas Scudder Page (W)	no such office	20W, 18D (Note: With the Kentucky Constitution of 1850 taking effect, the elections of 1851 changed Senate elections from occurring every year with a quarter of the body up to every two years with half of the body up, and changed House terms from one year to two years.)	55W, 45D	Joseph R. Underwood (W)	Henry Clay (W)	5D, 5W	Scott/ Graham (W) ✗
1852	Lazarus Powell (D)	John Burton Thompson (W)	James P. Metcalfe (D)	James Harlan (W)	Richard Curd Wintersmith	Thomas Scudder Page (W)	no such office	20W, 18D	55W, 45D	Joseph R. Underwood (W)	David Meriwether (D)	5D, 5W	Scott/ Graham (W) ✗
1852	Lazarus Powell (D)	John Burton Thompson (W)	James P. Metcalfe (D)	James Harlan (W)	Richard Curd Wintersmith	Thomas Scudder Page (W)	no such office	20W, 18D	55W, 45D	Joseph R. Underwood (W)	Archibald Dixon (W)	5D, 5W	Scott/ Graham (W) ✗
1853	Lazarus Powell (D)	vacant	James P. Metcalfe (D)	James Harlan (W)	Richard Curd Wintersmith	Thomas Scudder Page (W)	no such office	20W, 18D	55W, 45D	John Burton Thompson (KN)	Archibald Dixon (W)	5D, 5W	Scott/ Graham (W) ✗
1854	Lazarus Powell (D)	vacant	Grant Green (D)	James Harlan (W)	Richard Curd Wintersmith	Thomas Scudder Page (W)	no such office	23W, 15D	55W, 45D	John Burton Thompson (KN)	Archibald Dixon (W)	5D, 5W	Scott/ Graham (W) ✗
1855	Lazarus Powell (D)	vacant	Grant Green (D)	James Harlan (W)	Richard Curd Wintersmith	Thomas Scudder Page (W)	no such office	23W, 15D	55W, 45D	John Burton Thompson (KN)	John J. Crittenden (W)	6KN, 4D	Scott/ Graham (W) ✗
1856	Charles S. Morehead (KN)	James Greene Hardy (KN)	Mason Brown (KN)	James Harlan (W)	Richard Curd Wintersmith	Thomas Scudder Page (KN)	no such office	25KN, 13D	61KN, 39D	John Burton Thompson (KN)	John J. Crittenden (W)	6KN, 4D	Buchanan/ Breckinridge (D) ✓
1857	Charles S. Morehead (KN)	vacant	Mason Brown (KN)	James Harlan (W)	James H. Garrard	Thomas Scudder Page (KN)	no such office	25KN, 13D	61KN, 39D	John Burton Thompson (KN)	John J. Crittenden (KN)	8D, 2KN	Buchanan/ Breckinridge (D) ✓
1858	Charles S. Morehead (KN)	vacant	Mason Brown (KN)	James Harlan (W)	James H. Garrard	Thomas Scudder Page (KN)	no such office	20KN, 18D	62D, 38KN	John Burton Thompson (KN)	John J. Crittenden (KN)	8D, 2KN	Buchanan/ Breckinridge (D) ✓
1859	Charles S. Morehead (KN)	vacant	Mason Brown (KN)	James Harlan (W)	James H. Garrard	Thomas Scudder Page (KN)	no such office	20KN, 18D	62D, 38KN	Lazarus Powell (D)	John J. Crittenden (KN)	5D, 5O	Buchanan/ Breckinridge (D) ✓
1859	Beriah Magoffin (D) (Note: Resigned due to his disagreement with the state legislature over the American Civil War; he espoused neutrality.)	Linn Boyd (D)	Thomas Bell Monroe Jr. (D)	Andrew J. James (D)	James H. Garrard	Grant Green (D)	no such office	20KN, 18D	62D, 38KN	Lazarus Powell (D)	John J. Crittenden (KN)	5D, 5O	Buchanan/ Breckinridge (D) ✓
1860	Beriah Magoffin (D)	vacant	Thomas Bell Monroe Jr. (D)	Andrew J. James (D)	James H. Garrard	Grant Green (D)	no such office	24D, 14O	59D, 41O	Lazarus Powell (D)	John J. Crittenden (KN)	5D, 5O	Bell/ Everett (CU) ✗
1861	Beriah Magoffin (D)	vacant	Thomas Bell Monroe Jr. (D)	Andrew J. James (D)	James H. Garrard	Grant Green (D)	no such office	24D, 14O	59D, 41O	Lazarus Powell (D)	John C. Breckinridge (D)	9U, 1D	Bell/ Everett (CU) ✗
1862	Beriah Magoffin (D)	vacant	Nathaniel Gaither (D)	Andrew J. James (D)	James H. Garrard	Grant Green (D)	no such office	27U, 11SR	75U, 25SR	Lazarus Powell (D)	Garrett Davis (U)	10U	Bell/ Everett (CU) ✗
1862	James Fisher Robinson (D) (Note: As president of the senate, filled unexpired term – at the time the previous governor resigned, as there was no lieutenant governor.)	vacant	Daniel C. Wickliffe (D)	Andrew J. James (D)	James H. Garrard	Grant Green (D)	no such office	27U, 11SR	75U, 25SR	Lazarus Powell (D)	Garrett Davis (U)	10U	Bell/ Everett (CU) ✗
1863	James Fisher Robinson (D)	vacant	Daniel C. Wickliffe (D)	Andrew J. James (D)	James H. Garrard	Grant Green (D)	no such office	27U, 11SR	75U, 25SR	Lazarus Powell (D)	Garrett Davis (U)	9U	Bell/ Everett (CU) ✗
1864	Thomas E. Bramlette (D)	Richard Taylor Jacob (D)	Ephraim L. Van Winkle (W)	John Marshall Harlan (U)	James H. Garrard	A. T. Samuels	no such office	36U, 2SR	96U, 4SR	Lazarus Powell (D)	Garrett Davis (U)	9U	McClellan/ Pendleton (D) ✗
1865	Thomas E. Bramlette (D)	Richard Taylor Jacob (D)	Ephraim L. Van Winkle (W)	John Marshall Harlan (U)	James H. Garrard	A. T. Samuels	no such office	36U, 2SR	96U, 4SR	James Guthrie (D)	Garrett Davis (U)	5D, 4U	McClellan/ Pendleton (D) ✗
1866	Thomas E. Bramlette (D)	Richard Taylor Jacob (D)	John S. Van Winkle	John Marshall Harlan (U)	Mason Brown (D)	A. T. Samuels	no such office	20O, 18UU	58O, 42UU	James Guthrie (D)	Garrett Davis (U)	6D, 3U	McClellan/ Pendleton (D) ✗
1867	Thomas E. Bramlette (D)	Richard Taylor Jacob (D)	John S. Van Winkle	John Marshall Harlan (U)	Mason Brown (D)	A. T. Samuels	no such office	20O, 18UU	58O, 42UU	James Guthrie (D)	Garrett Davis (D)	7D, 2 vac.	McClellan/ Pendleton (D) ✗
1867	John L. Helm (D)	John W. Stevenson (D)	Samuel B. Churchill (D)	John Rodman (D)	James Tate (D)	D. Howard Smith (D)	no such office	20O, 18UU	58O, 42UU	James Guthrie (D)	Garrett Davis (D)	7D, 2 vac.	McClellan/ Pendleton (D) ✗
1868	John W. Stevenson (D) (Note: As lieutenant governor, filled unexpired term, and was later elected in his own right.)	vacant	Samuel B. Churchill (D)	John Rodman (D)	James Tate (D)	D. Howard Smith (D)	no such office	27D, 7R, 4UD	86D, 10R, 4UD	Thomas C. McCreery (D)	Garrett Davis (D)	7D, 1R, 1 vac.	Seymour/ Blair (D) ✗
1869	John W. Stevenson (D)	vacant	Samuel B. Churchill (D)	John Rodman (D)	James Tate (D)	D. Howard Smith (D)	no such office	27D, 7R, 4UD	86D, 10R, 4UD	Thomas C. McCreery (D)	Garrett Davis (D)	9D	Seymour/ Blair (D) ✗
1870	John W. Stevenson (D)	vacant	Samuel B. Churchill (D)	John Rodman (D)	James Tate (D)	D. Howard Smith (D)	no such office	36D, 2R	92D, 8R	Thomas C. McCreery (D)	Garrett Davis (D)	9D	Seymour/ Blair (D) ✗
1871	John W. Stevenson (D)	vacant	Samuel B. Churchill (D)	John Rodman (D)	James Tate (D)	D. Howard Smith (D)	no such office	36D, 2R	92D, 8R	Thomas C. McCreery (D)	Garrett Davis (D)	9D	Seymour/ Blair (D) ✗
1871	Preston Leslie (D) (Note: As president of the state Senate, filled unexpired term because at the time the previous governor resigned, there was no lieutenant governor; was later elected in his own right.)	vacant	Samuel B. Churchill (D)	John Rodman (D)	James Tate (D)	D. Howard Smith (D)	no such office	36D, 2R	92D, 8R	John W. Stevenson (D)	Garrett Davis (D)	9D	Seymour/ Blair (D) ✗
1871	Preston Leslie (D)	John G. Carlisle (D)	Andrew J. James (D)	John Rodman (D)	James Tate (D)	D. Howard Smith (D)	no such office	36D, 2R	92D, 8R	John W. Stevenson (D)	Garrett Davis (D)	9D	Seymour/ Blair (D) ✗
1872	Preston Leslie (D)	John G. Carlisle (D)	Andrew J. James (D)	John Rodman (D)	James Tate (D)	D. Howard Smith (D)	no such office	35D, 3R	88D, 12R	John W. Stevenson (D)	Garrett Davis (D)	9D	Seymour/ Blair (D) ✗
1872	Preston Leslie (D)	John G. Carlisle (D)	George Washington Craddock (D)	John Rodman (D)	James Tate (D)	D. Howard Smith (D)	no such office	35D, 3R	88D, 12R	John W. Stevenson (D)	Willis B. Machen (D)	9D	Hendricks/ Brown (D) ✗
1873	Preston Leslie (D)	John G. Carlisle (D)	George Washington Craddock (D)	John Rodman (D)	James Tate (D)	D. Howard Smith (D)	no such office	35D, 3R	88D, 12R	John W. Stevenson (D)	Thomas C. McCreery (D)	10D	Hendricks/ Brown (D) ✗
1874	Preston Leslie (D)	John G. Carlisle (D)	George Washington Craddock (D)	John Rodman (D)	James Tate (D)	D. Howard Smith (D)	no such office	31D, 7R	79D, 21R	John W. Stevenson (D)	Thomas C. McCreery (D)	10D	Hendricks/ Brown (D) ✗
1875	Preston Leslie (D)	John G. Carlisle (D)	George Washington Craddock (D)	John Rodman (D)	James Tate (D)	D. Howard Smith (D)	no such office	31D, 7R	79D, 21R	John W. Stevenson (D)	Thomas C. McCreery (D)	9D, 1R	Hendricks/ Brown (D) ✗
1876	James B. McCreary (D)	John C. Underwood (D)	J. Stoddard Johnston (D)	Thomas Edward Moss (D)	James Tate (D)	D. Howard Smith (D)	Winston Jones Davie (D)	32D, 6R	89D, 11R	John W. Stevenson (D)	Thomas C. McCreery (D)	9D, 1R	Tilden/ Hendricks (D) ✗
1877	James B. McCreary (D)	John C. Underwood (D)	J. Stoddard Johnston (D)	Thomas Edward Moss (D)	James Tate (D)	D. Howard Smith (D)	Winston Jones Davie (D)	32D, 6R	89D, 11R	James B. Beck (D)	Thomas C. McCreery (D)	10D	Tilden/ Hendricks (D) ✗
1878	James B. McCreary (D)	John C. Underwood (D)	J. Stoddard Johnston (D)	Thomas Edward Moss (D)	James Tate (D)	D. Howard Smith (D)	Winston Jones Davie (D)	37D, 1R	87D, 13R	James B. Beck (D)	Thomas C. McCreery (D)	10D	Tilden/ Hendricks (D) ✗
1879	James B. McCreary (D)	John C. Underwood (D)	J. Stoddard Johnston (D)	Thomas Edward Moss (D)	James Tate (D)	D. Howard Smith (D)	Winston Jones Davie (D)	37D, 1R	87D, 13R	James B. Beck (D)	John Stuart Williams (D)	9D, 1ID	Tilden/ Hendricks (D) ✗
1880	Luke P. Blackburn (D)	James E. Cantrill (D)	Samuel B. Churchill (D)	Parker Watkins Hardin (D)	James Tate (D)	Fayette Hewitt (D) (Note: Resigned to accept the presidency of the State National Bank of Frankfort.)	Charles W. Bowman (D) (Note: appointed)	34D, 4R	80D, 17R, 3G	James B. Beck (D)	John Stuart Williams (D)	9D, 1ID	Hancock/ English (D) ✗
1881	Luke P. Blackburn (D)	James E. Cantrill (D)	James W. Blackburn (D)	Parker Watkins Hardin (D)	James Tate (D)	Fayette Hewitt (D)	Charles W. Bowman (D)	34D, 4R	80D, 17R, 3G	James B. Beck (D)	John Stuart Williams (D)	8D, 1R, 1ID	Hancock/ English (D) ✗
1882	Luke P. Blackburn (D)	James E. Cantrill (D)	James W. Blackburn (D)	Parker Watkins Hardin (D)	James Tate (D)	Fayette Hewitt (D)	Charles W. Bowman (D)	29D, 9R	73D, 21R, 4G, 2I	James B. Beck (D)	John Stuart Williams (D)	8D, 1R, 1ID	Hancock/ English (D) ✗
1883	Luke P. Blackburn (D)	James E. Cantrill (D)	James W. Blackburn (D)	Parker Watkins Hardin (D)	James Tate (D)	Fayette Hewitt (D)	Charles W. Bowman (D)	29D, 9R	73D, 21R, 4G, 2I	James B. Beck (D)	John Stuart Williams (D)	8D, 2R, 1ID	Hancock/ English (D) ✗
1884	J. Proctor Knott (D)	James R. Hindman (D)	James A. McKenzie (D)	Parker Watkins Hardin (D)	James Tate (D)	Fayette Hewitt (D)	John F. Davis (D)	33D, 5R	90D, 10R	James B. Beck (D)	John Stuart Williams (D)	8D, 2R, 1ID	Cleveland/ Hendricks (D) ✓
1885	J. Proctor Knott (D)	James R. Hindman (D)	James A. McKenzie (D)	Parker Watkins Hardin (D)	James Tate (D)	Fayette Hewitt (D)	John F. Davis (D)	33D, 5R	90D, 10R	James B. Beck (D)	J. C. S. Blackburn (D)	10D, 1R	Cleveland/ Hendricks (D) ✓
1886	J. Proctor Knott (D)	James R. Hindman (D)	James A. McKenzie (D)	Parker Watkins Hardin (D)	James Tate (D)	Fayette Hewitt (D)	John F. Davis (D)	34D, 4R	80D, 20R	James B. Beck (D)	J. C. S. Blackburn (D)	10D, 1R	Cleveland/ Hendricks (D) ✓
1887	J. Proctor Knott (D)	James R. Hindman (D)	James A. McKenzie (D)	Parker Watkins Hardin (D)	James Tate (D)	Fayette Hewitt (D)	John F. Davis (D)	34D, 4R	80D, 20R	James B. Beck (D)	J. C. S. Blackburn (D)	8D, 3R	Cleveland/ Hendricks (D) ✓
1888	Simon Bolivar Buckner (D)	James William Bryan (D)	George Madison Adams (D)	Parker Watkins Hardin (D)	James Tate (D)	Fayette Hewitt (D)	Charles Y. Wilson (D)	31D, 7R	70D, 26R, 2Proh, 2Lab	James B. Beck (D)	J. C. S. Blackburn (D)	8D, 3R	Cleveland/ Thurman (D) ✗
1889	Simon Bolivar Buckner (D)	James William Bryan (D)	George Madison Adams (D)	Parker Watkins Hardin (D)	Stephen G. Sharpe (D) (Note: Appointed to fill vacancy.)	Fayette Hewitt (D)	Charles Y. Wilson (D)	31D, 7R	70D, 26R, 2Proh, 2Lab	James B. Beck (D)	J. C. S. Blackburn (D)	9D, 2R	Cleveland/ Thurman (D) ✗
1890	Simon Bolivar Buckner (D)	James William Bryan (D)	George Madison Adams (D)	William J. Hendrick (D)	Stephen G. Sharpe (D)	L. C. Norman	Charles Y. Wilson (D)	31D, 7R	85D, 15R	James B. Beck (D)	J. C. S. Blackburn (D)	9D, 2R	Cleveland/ Thurman (D) ✗
1890	Simon Bolivar Buckner (D)	James William Bryan (D)	George Madison Adams (D)	William J. Hendrick (D)	Henry S. Hale (D) (Note: Appointed to fill vacancy, subsequently elected to a full term.)	L. C. Norman	Charles Y. Wilson (D)	31D, 7R	85D, 15R	John G. Carlisle (D)	J. C. S. Blackburn (D)	9D, 2R	Cleveland/ Thurman (D) ✗
1891	Simon Bolivar Buckner (D)	James William Bryan (D)	George Madison Adams (D)	William J. Hendrick (D)	Henry S. Hale (D)	L. C. Norman	Charles Y. Wilson (D)	31D, 7R	85D, 15R	John G. Carlisle (D)	J. C. S. Blackburn (D)	10D, 1R	Cleveland/ Thurman (D) ✗
1891	Simon Bolivar Buckner (D)	James William Bryan (D)	Willis Lunsford Ringo (D)	William J. Hendrick (D)	Henry S. Hale (D)	L. C. Norman	Charles Y. Wilson (D)	31D, 7R	85D, 15R	John G. Carlisle (D)	J. C. S. Blackburn (D)	10D, 1R	Cleveland/ Thurman (D) ✗
1892	John Y. Brown (D)	Mitchell Cary Alford (D)	John W. Headley (D)	William J. Hendrick (D)	Henry S. Hale (D)	L. C. Norman	Nicholas McDowell (D) (Note: The adoption of the 1891 Kentucky Constitution made the Commissioner of Agriculture an elected position.)	28D, 9R, 1Pop	70D, 16R, 10Pop, 4ID	John G. Carlisle (D)	J. C. S. Blackburn (D)	10D, 1R	Cleveland/ Stevenson (D) ✓
1893	John Y. Brown (D)	Mitchell Cary Alford (D)	John W. Headley (D)	William J. Hendrick (D)	Henry S. Hale (D)	L. C. Norman	Nicholas McDowell (D)	28D, 9R, 1Pop	70D, 16R, 10Pop, 4ID	William Lindsay (D)	J. C. S. Blackburn (D)	10D, 1R	Cleveland/ Stevenson (D) ✓
1894	John Y. Brown (D)	Mitchell Cary Alford (D)	John W. Headley (D)	William J. Hendrick (D)	Henry S. Hale (D)	L. C. Norman	Nicholas McDowell (D)	27D, 11R	76D, 22R, 2Pop	William Lindsay (D)	J. C. S. Blackburn (D)	10D, 1R	Cleveland/ Stevenson (D) ✓
1895	John Y. Brown (D)	Mitchell Cary Alford (D)	John W. Headley (D)	William J. Hendrick (D)	Henry S. Hale (D)	L. C. Norman	Nicholas McDowell (D)	27D, 11R	76D, 22R, 2Pop	William Lindsay (D)	J. C. S. Blackburn (D)	6R, 5D	Cleveland/ Stevenson (D) ✓
1896	William O'Connell Bradley (R)	William Jackson Worthington (R)	Charles Finley (R) (Note: First elected Secretary of State.)	William S. Taylor (R)	George W. Long (R)	Samuel H. Stone (R)	Lucas Moore (R)	22D, 16R	52R, 46D, 2Pop	William Lindsay (D)	J. C. S. Blackburn (D)	6R, 5D	12 – McKinley/ Hobart (R) ✓ 1 – Bryan/ Sewall (D) ✗
1897	William O'Connell Bradley (R)	William Jackson Worthington (R)	Charles Finley (R)	William S. Taylor (R)	George W. Long (R)	Samuel H. Stone (R)	Lucas Moore (R)	22D, 16R	54R, 44D, 2Pop	William Lindsay (D)	William J. Deboe (R)	7D, 4R	12 – McKinley/ Hobart (R) ✓ 1 – Bryan/ Sewall (D) ✗
1898	William O'Connell Bradley (R)	William Jackson Worthington (R)	Charles Finley (R)	William S. Taylor (R)	George W. Long (R)	Samuel H. Stone (R)	Lucas Moore (R)	27D, 11R	72D, 26R, 2Pop	William Lindsay (D)	William J. Deboe (R)	7D, 4R	12 – McKinley/ Hobart (R) ✓ 1 – Bryan/ Sewall (D) ✗
1899	William O'Connell Bradley (R)	William Jackson Worthington (R)	Charles Finley (R)	William S. Taylor (R)	George W. Long (R)	Samuel H. Stone (R)	Lucas Moore (R)	27D, 11R	72D, 26R, 2Pop	William Lindsay (D)	William J. Deboe (R)	9D, 2R	12 – McKinley/ Hobart (R) ✓ 1 – Bryan/ Sewall (D) ✗
1900	William S. Taylor (R) (Note: William S. Taylor was sworn in and assumed office, but the state legislature challenged the validity of his election, claiming ballot fraud. William Goebel, his challenger in the election, was shot on January 30, 1900. The next day, the legislature named Goebel governor. However, Goebel died from his wounds three days later. Taylor fled the state and never returned and was pardoned by Governor Augustus E. Willson in 1909.)	John Marshall (R)	Caleb Powers (R)	R. J. Breckinridge(D)	Walter R. Day (R)	John S. Sweeny	Ion B. Nall (D)	26D, 12R	60D, 40R	William Lindsay (D)	William J. Deboe (R)	9D, 2R	Bryan/ Stevenson (D) ✗
1900	William Goebel (D)	J. C. W. Beckham (D)	Caleb Breckinridge Hill (D)	R. J. Breckinridge(D)	Samuel W. Hager (D)	Gus G. Coulter (D)	Ion B. Nall (D)	26D, 12R	60D, 40R	William Lindsay (D)	William J. Deboe (R)	9D, 2R	Bryan/ Stevenson (D) ✗
1900	J. C. W. Beckham (D) (Note: As lieutenant governor, filled unexpired term until elected to fill it in a special election.)	vacant	Caleb Breckinridge Hill (D)	R. J. Breckinridge(D)	Samuel W. Hager (D)	Gus G. Coulter (D)	Ion B. Nall (D)	26D, 12R	60D, 40R	William Lindsay (D)	William J. Deboe (R)	9D, 2R	Bryan/ Stevenson (D) ✗
1901	J. C. W. Beckham (D)	vacant	Caleb Breckinridge Hill (D)	R. J. Breckinridge(D)	Samuel W. Hager (D)	Gus G. Coulter (D)	Ion B. Nall (D)	26D, 12R	60D, 40R	J. C. S. Blackburn (D)	William J. Deboe (R)	8D, 3R	Bryan/ Stevenson (D) ✗
1902	J. C. W. Beckham (D)	vacant	Caleb Breckinridge Hill (D)	C. J. Pratt	Samuel W. Hager (D)	Gus G. Coulter (D)	Ion B. Nall (D)	25D, 13R	73D, 26R, 1ID	J. C. S. Blackburn (D)	William J. Deboe (R)	8D, 3R	Bryan/ Stevenson (D) ✗
1903	J. C. W. Beckham (D)	vacant	Caleb Breckinridge Hill (D)	C. J. Pratt	Samuel W. Hager (D)	Gus G. Coulter (D)	Ion B. Nall (D)	25D, 13R	73D, 26R, 1ID	J. C. S. Blackburn (D)	James B. McCreary (D)	10D, 1R	Bryan/ Stevenson (D) ✗
1904	J. C. W. Beckham (D)	William P. Thorne (D)	Harry V. McChesney (D)	N. B. Hays (D)	Henry M. Bosworth (D)	Samuel W. Hager (D)	Hubert Vreeland (D)	31D, 7R	77D, 23R	J. C. S. Blackburn (D)	James B. McCreary (D)	10D, 1R	Parker/ Davis (D) ✗
1905	J. C. W. Beckham (D)	William P. Thorne (D)	Harry V. McChesney (D)	N. B. Hays (D)	Henry M. Bosworth (D)	Samuel W. Hager (D)	Hubert Vreeland (D)	31D, 7R	77D, 23R	J. C. S. Blackburn (D)	James B. McCreary (D)	9D, 2R	Parker/ Davis (D) ✗
1906	J. C. W. Beckham (D)	William P. Thorne (D)	Harry V. McChesney (D)	N. B. Hays (D)	Henry M. Bosworth (D)	Samuel W. Hager (D)	Hubert Vreeland (D)	31D, 7R	73D, 27R	J. C. S. Blackburn (D)	James B. McCreary (D)	9D, 2R	Parker/ Davis (D) ✗
1907	J. C. W. Beckham (D)	William P. Thorne (D)	Harry V. McChesney (D)	N. B. Hays (D)	Henry M. Bosworth (D)	Samuel W. Hager (D)	Hubert Vreeland (D)	31D, 7R	73D, 27R	Thomas H. Paynter (D)	James B. McCreary (D)	7D, 4R	Parker/ Davis (D) ✗
1908	Augustus E. Willson (R)	William Hopkinson Cox (R)	Ben L. Bruner (R)	James Breathitt (R)	Edwin Farley (R)	Frank P. James (R)	M. C. Rankin (R)	22D, 16R	51D, 49R	Thomas H. Paynter (D)	James B. McCreary (D)	7D, 4R	Bryan/ Kern (D) ✗
1909	Augustus E. Willson (R)	William Hopkinson Cox (R)	Ben L. Bruner (R)	James Breathitt (R)	Edwin Farley (R)	Frank P. James (R)	M. C. Rankin (R)	22D, 16R	51D, 49R	Thomas H. Paynter (D)	William O'Connell Bradley (R)	8D, 3R	Bryan/ Kern (D) ✗
1910	Augustus E. Willson (R)	William Hopkinson Cox (R)	Ben L. Bruner (R)	James Breathitt (R)	Edwin Farley (R)	Frank P. James (R)	M. C. Rankin (R)	26D, 12R	73D, 27R	Thomas H. Paynter (D)	William O'Connell Bradley (R)	8D, 3R	Bryan/ Kern (D) ✗
1911	Augustus E. Willson (R)	William Hopkinson Cox (R)	Ben L. Bruner (R)	James Breathitt (R)	Edwin Farley (R)	Frank P. James (R)	M. C. Rankin (R)	26D, 12R	73D, 27R	Thomas H. Paynter (D)	William O'Connell Bradley (R)	9D, 2R	Bryan/ Kern (D) ✗
1912	James B. McCreary (D)	Edward J. McDermott (D)	Carl F. Crecelius (D)	James Garnett (D)	Thomas Rhea (D)	Henry M. Bosworth (D)	J. W. Newman (D)	32D, 6R	76D, 24R	Thomas H. Paynter (D)	William O'Connell Bradley (R)	9D, 2R	Wilson/ Marshall (D) ✓
1913	James B. McCreary (D)	Edward J. McDermott (D)	Carl F. Crecelius (D)	James Garnett (D)	Thomas Rhea (D)	Henry M. Bosworth (D)	J. W. Newman (D)	32D, 6R	76D, 24R	Ollie Murray James (D)	William O'Connell Bradley (R)	9D, 2R	Wilson/ Marshall (D) ✓
1914	James B. McCreary (D)	Edward J. McDermott (D)	Carl F. Crecelius (D)	James Garnett (D)	Thomas Rhea (D)	Henry M. Bosworth (D)	J. W. Newman (D)	25D, 13R	79D, 20R, 1Fus	Ollie Murray James (D)	William O'Connell Bradley (R)	9D, 2R	Wilson/ Marshall (D) ✓
1914	James B. McCreary (D)	Edward J. McDermott (D)	Carl F. Crecelius (D)	James Garnett (D)	Thomas Rhea (D)	Henry M. Bosworth (D)	J. W. Newman (D)	25D, 13R	79D, 20R, 1Fus	Ollie Murray James (D)	Johnson N. Camden Jr. (D)	9D, 2R	Wilson/ Marshall (D) ✓
1915	James B. McCreary (D)	Edward J. McDermott (D)	Carl F. Crecelius (D)	James Garnett (D)	Thomas Rhea (D)	Henry M. Bosworth (D)	J. W. Newman (D)	25D, 13R	79D, 20R, 1Fus	Ollie Murray James (D)	J. C. W. Beckham (D)	9D, 2R	Wilson/ Marshall (D) ✓
1916	Augustus Owsley Stanley (D)	James D. Black (D)	James P. Lewis (R)	M. M. Logan (D)	Sherman Goodpaster (D)	Robert L. Greene (D)	Mat S. Cohen (D)	28D, 10R	64D, 36R	Ollie Murray James (D)	J. C. W. Beckham (D)	9D, 2R	Wilson/ Marshall (D) ✓
1917	Augustus Owsley Stanley (D)	James D. Black (D)	James P. Lewis (R)	M. M. Logan (D)	Sherman Goodpaster (D)	Robert L. Greene (D)	Mat S. Cohen (D)	28D, 10R	64D, 36R	Ollie Murray James (D)	J. C. W. Beckham (D)	9D, 2R	Wilson/ Marshall (D) ✓
1918	Augustus Owsley Stanley (D)	James D. Black (D)	James P. Lewis (R)	Charles H. Morris	Sherman Goodpaster (D)	Robert L. Greene (D)	Mat S. Cohen (D)	24D, 14R	60D, 40R	Ollie Murray James (D)	J. C. W. Beckham (D)	9D, 2R	Wilson/ Marshall (D) ✓
1918	Augustus Owsley Stanley (D)	James D. Black (D)	James P. Lewis (R)	Charles H. Morris	Sherman Goodpaster (D)	Robert L. Greene (D)	Mat S. Cohen (D)	24D, 14R	60D, 40R	George B. Martin (D)	J. C. W. Beckham (D)	9D, 2R	Wilson/ Marshall (D) ✓
1919	Augustus Owsley Stanley (D)	James D. Black (D)	James P. Lewis (R)	Charles H. Morris	Sherman Goodpaster (D)	Robert L. Greene (D)	Mat S. Cohen (D)	24D, 14R	60D, 40R	George B. Martin (D)	J. C. W. Beckham (D)	7D, 4R	Wilson/ Marshall (D) ✓
1919	James D. Black (D)	vacant	James P. Lewis (R)	Charles H. Morris	Sherman Goodpaster (D)	T. M. Jones (Note: As assistant state auditor, was appointed to fill vacancy.)	Mat S. Cohen (D)	24D, 14R	60D, 40R	Augustus Owsley Stanley (D)	J. C. W. Beckham (D)	7D, 4R	Wilson/ Marshall (D) ✓
1920	Edwin P. Morrow (R)	S. Thruston Ballard (R)	Fred A. Vaughn (R)	Charles I. Dawson (R)	James A. Wallace (R)	John J. Craig (R)	William C. Hanna (R)	20D, 18R	55R, 45D	Augustus Owsley Stanley (D)	J. C. W. Beckham (D)	7D, 4R	Cox/ Roosevelt (D) ✗
1921	Edwin P. Morrow (R)	S. Thruston Ballard (R)	Fred A. Vaughn (R)	Charles I. Dawson (R)	James A. Wallace (R)	John J. Craig (R)	William C. Hanna (R)	20D, 18R	55R, 45D	Augustus Owsley Stanley (D)	Richard P. Ernst (R)	8D, 3R	Cox/ Roosevelt (D) ✗
1922	Edwin P. Morrow (R)	S. Thruston Ballard (R)	Fred A. Vaughn (R)	Charles I. Dawson (R)	James A. Wallace (R)	John J. Craig (R)	William C. Hanna (R)	20D, 18R	68D, 32R	Augustus Owsley Stanley (D)	Richard P. Ernst (R)	8D, 3R	Cox/ Roosevelt (D) ✗
1923	Edwin P. Morrow (R)	S. Thruston Ballard (R)	Fred A. Vaughn (R)	T.B. McGregor (R)	James A. Wallace (R)	John J. Craig (R)	William C. Hanna (R)	20D, 18R	68D, 32R	Augustus Owsley Stanley (D)	Richard P. Ernst (R)	8D, 3R	Cox/ Roosevelt (D) ✗
1924	William J. Fields (D)	Henry Denhardt (D)	Emma Guy Cromwell (D)	Frank E. Daugherty (D)	Edward B. Dishman (D)	William H. Shanks (D)	Clell Coleman (D)	25D, 13R	67D, 32R, 1I	Augustus Owsley Stanley (D)	Richard P. Ernst (R)	8D, 3R	Coolidge/ Dawes (R) ✓
1925	William J. Fields (D)	Henry Denhardt (D)	Emma Guy Cromwell (D)	Frank E. Daugherty (D)	Edward B. Dishman (D)	William H. Shanks (D)	Clell Coleman (D)	25D, 13R	67D, 32R, 1I	Frederic M. Sackett (R)	Richard P. Ernst (R)	8D, 3R	Coolidge/ Dawes (R) ✓
1926	William J. Fields (D)	Henry Denhardt (D)	Emma Guy Cromwell (D)	Frank E. Daugherty (D)	Edward B. Dishman (D)	William H. Shanks (D)	Clell Coleman (D)	26D, 12R	65D, 35R	Frederic M. Sackett (R)	Richard P. Ernst (R)	8D, 3R	Coolidge/ Dawes (R) ✓
1927	William J. Fields (D)	Henry Denhardt (D)	Emma Guy Cromwell (D)	Frank E. Daugherty (D)	Edward B. Dishman (D)	William H. Shanks (D)	Clell Coleman (D)	26D, 12R	65D, 35R	Frederic M. Sackett (R)	Alben W. Barkley (D)	8D, 3R	Coolidge/ Dawes (R) ✓
1928	Flem D. Sampson (R)	James Breathitt Jr. (D)	Ella Lewis (D)	James W. Cammack (D)	Emma Guy Cromwell (D)	Clell Coleman (D)	Newton Bright (D)	24D, 14R	62D, 38R	Frederic M. Sackett (R)	Alben W. Barkley (D)	8D, 3R	Hoover/ Curtis (R) ✓
1929	Flem D. Sampson (R)	James Breathitt Jr. (D)	Ella Lewis (D)	James W. Cammack (D)	Emma Guy Cromwell (D)	Clell Coleman (D)	Newton Bright (D)	24D, 14R	62D, 38R	Frederic M. Sackett (R)	Alben W. Barkley (D)	9R, 2D	Hoover/ Curtis (R) ✓
1929	Flem D. Sampson (R)	James Breathitt Jr. (D)	Ella Lewis (D)	James W. Cammack (D)	Emma Guy Cromwell (D)	Clell Coleman (D)	Newton Bright (D)	24D, 14R	62D, 38R	Frederic M. Sackett (R)	Alben W. Barkley (D)	8R, 3D	Hoover/ Curtis (R) ✓
1930	Flem D. Sampson (R)	James Breathitt Jr. (D)	Ella Lewis (D)	James W. Cammack (D)	Emma Guy Cromwell (D)	Clell Coleman (D)	Newton Bright (D)	24D, 14R	66D, 34R	John M. Robsion (R)	Alben W. Barkley (D)	8R, 3D	Hoover/ Curtis (R) ✓
1930	Flem D. Sampson (R)	James Breathitt Jr. (D)	Ella Lewis (D)	James W. Cammack (D)	Emma Guy Cromwell (D)	Clell Coleman (D)	Newton Bright (D)	24D, 14R	66D, 34R	Ben M. Williamson (D)	Alben W. Barkley (D)	8R, 3D	Hoover/ Curtis (R) ✓
1931	Flem D. Sampson (R)	James Breathitt Jr. (D)	Ella Lewis (D)	James W. Cammack (D)	Emma Guy Cromwell (D)	Clell Coleman (D)	Newton Bright (D)	24D, 14R	66D, 34R	M. M. Logan (D)	Alben W. Barkley (D)	9D, 2R	Hoover/ Curtis (R) ✓
1932	Ruby Laffoon (D)	Happy Chandler (D)	Sara Mahan (D)	Bailey P. Wootton (D)	Elam Huddleston (D)	J. Dan Talbott (D)	Eugene Flowers (D)	26D, 12R	74D, 26R	M. M. Logan (D)	Alben W. Barkley (D)	9D, 2R	Roosevelt/ Garner (D) ✓
1933	Ruby Laffoon (D)	Happy Chandler (D)	Sara Mahan (D)	Bailey P. Wootton (D)	Elam Huddleston (D)	J. Dan Talbott (D)	Eugene Flowers (D)	26D, 12R	74D, 26R	M. M. Logan (D)	Alben W. Barkley (D)	9D	Roosevelt/ Garner (D) ✓
1934	Ruby Laffoon (D)	Happy Chandler (D)	Sara Mahan (D)	Bailey P. Wootton (D)	Elam Huddleston (D)	J. Dan Talbott (D)	Eugene Flowers (D)	26D, 12R	70D, 30R	M. M. Logan (D)	Alben W. Barkley (D)	9D	Roosevelt/ Garner (D) ✓
1935	Ruby Laffoon (D)	Happy Chandler (D)	Sara Mahan (D)	Bailey P. Wootton (D)	Elam Huddleston (D)	J. Dan Talbott (D)	Eugene Flowers (D)	26D, 12R	70D, 30R	M. M. Logan (D)	Alben W. Barkley (D)	8D, 1R	Roosevelt/ Garner (D) ✓
1936	Happy Chandler (D) (Note: Resigned to take an appointed seat in the United States Senate.)	Keen Johnson (D)	Charles D. Arnett (D)	Beverly M. Vincent (D) (Note: Resigned to take an elected seat in the United States House of Representatives.)	John E. Buckingham	Ernest E. Shannon (D)	Garth Ferguson (D)	26D, 12R	66D, 34R	M. M. Logan (D)	Alben W. Barkley (D)	8D, 1R	Roosevelt/ Garner (D) ✓
1937	Happy Chandler (D)	Keen Johnson (D)	Charles D. Arnett (D)	Hubert Meredith (D)	John E. Buckingham	Ernest E. Shannon (D)	Garth Ferguson (D)	26D, 12R	66D, 34R	M. M. Logan (D)	Alben W. Barkley (D)	8D, 1R	Roosevelt/ Garner (D) ✓
1938	Happy Chandler (D)	Keen Johnson (D)	Charles D. Arnett (D)	Hubert Meredith (D)	John E. Buckingham	Ernest E. Shannon (D)	Garth Ferguson (D)	28D, 10R	76D, 24R	M. M. Logan (D)	Alben W. Barkley (D)	8D, 1R	Roosevelt/ Garner (D) ✓
1939	Happy Chandler (D)	Keen Johnson (D)	Charles D. Arnett (D)	Hubert Meredith (D)	John E. Buckingham	Ernest E. Shannon (D)	Garth Ferguson (D)	28D, 10R	76D, 24R	M. M. Logan (D)	Alben W. Barkley (D)	8D, 1R	Roosevelt/ Garner (D) ✓
1939	Keen Johnson (D)	vacant	Charles D. Arnett (D)	Hubert Meredith (D)	John E. Buckingham	Ernest E. Shannon (D)	Garth Ferguson (D)	28D, 10R	76D, 24R	Happy Chandler (D)	Alben W. Barkley (D)	8D, 1R	Roosevelt/ Garner (D) ✓
1940	Keen Johnson (D)	Rodes K. Myers (D)	George G. Hatcher (D)	Hubert Meredith (D)	Ernest E. Shannon (D)	David A. Logan	William H. May (D)	29D, 9R	73D, 27R	Happy Chandler (D)	Alben W. Barkley (D)	8D, 1R	Roosevelt/ Wallace (D) ✓
1941	Keen Johnson (D)	Rodes K. Myers (D)	George G. Hatcher (D)	Hubert Meredith (D)	Ernest E. Shannon (D)	David A. Logan	William H. May (D)	29D, 9R	73D, 27R	Happy Chandler (D)	Alben W. Barkley (D)	8D, 1R	Roosevelt/ Wallace (D) ✓
1942	Keen Johnson (D)	Rodes K. Myers (D)	George G. Hatcher (D)	Hubert Meredith (D)	Ernest E. Shannon (D)	David A. Logan	William H. May (D)	29D, 9R	75D, 25R	Happy Chandler (D)	Alben W. Barkley (D)	8D, 1R	Roosevelt/ Wallace (D) ✓
1943	Keen Johnson (D)	Rodes K. Myers (D)	George G. Hatcher (D)	Hubert Meredith (D)	Ernest E. Shannon (D)	B.L. Sparks	William H. May (D)	29D, 9R	75D, 25R	Happy Chandler (D)	Alben W. Barkley (D)	8D, 1R	Roosevelt/ Wallace (D) ✓
1944	Simeon Willis (R)	Kenneth H. Tuggle (R)	Charles K. O'Connell (D)	Eldon S. Dummit (R)	Thomas W. Vinson (R)	Charles I. Ross (R)	Elliott Robertson (R)	23D, 15R	57D, 43R	Happy Chandler (D)	Alben W. Barkley (D)	7D, 2R	Roosevelt/ Truman (D) ✓
1945	Simeon Willis (R)	Kenneth H. Tuggle (R)	Charles K. O'Connell (D)	Eldon S. Dummit (R)	Thomas W. Vinson (R)	Charles I. Ross (R)	Elliott Robertson (R)	23D, 15R	57D, 43R	Happy Chandler (D)	Alben W. Barkley (D)	8D, 1R	Roosevelt/ Truman (D) ✓
1946	Simeon Willis (R)	Kenneth H. Tuggle (R)	Charles K. O'Connell (D)	Eldon S. Dummit (R)	Thomas W. Vinson (R)	Charles I. Ross (R)	Elliott Robertson (R)	21D, 17R	69D, 31R	William A. Stanfill (R)	Alben W. Barkley (D)	8D, 1R	Roosevelt/ Truman (D) ✓
1947	Simeon Willis (R)	Kenneth H. Tuggle (R)	Charles K. O'Connell (D)	Eldon S. Dummit (R)	Thomas W. Vinson (R)	W. D. Bratcher	Elliott Robertson (R)	21D, 17R	69D, 31R	John Sherman Cooper (R)	Alben W. Barkley (D)	6D, 3R	Roosevelt/ Truman (D) ✓
1948	Earle Clements (D)	Lawrence Wetherby (D)	George G. Hatcher (D)	Alvarado E. Funk (D)	Edward F. Seiller (D) (Note: Resigned to take a position in Washington, D.C.)	Harry Newman Jones (D)	Harry F. Walters (D)	29D, 9R	75D, 25R	John Sherman Cooper (R)	Alben W. Barkley (D)	6D, 3R	Truman/ Barkley (D) ✓
1949	Earle Clements (D)	Lawrence Wetherby (D)	George G. Hatcher (D)	Alvarado E. Funk (D)	Edward F. Seiller (D)	Harry Newman Jones (D)	Harry F. Walters (D)	29D, 9R	75D, 25R	Virgil Chapman (D)	Garrett Withers (D)	7D, 2R	Truman/ Barkley (D) ✓
1950	Earle Clements (D)	Lawrence Wetherby (D)	George G. Hatcher (D)	Alvarado E. Funk (D)	Pearl Frances Runyon (D)	Harry Newman Jones (D)	Harry F. Walters (D)	29D, 9R	76D, 24R	Virgil Chapman (D)	Garrett Withers (D)	7D, 2R	Truman/ Barkley (D) ✓
1951	Lawrence Wetherby (D)	vacant	George G. Hatcher (D)	Alvarado E. Funk (D)	Pearl Frances Runyon (D)	Harry Newman Jones (D)	Harry F. Walters (D)	29D, 9R	76D, 24R	Thomas R. Underwood (D)	Earle Clements (D)	7D, 2R	Truman/ Barkley (D) ✓
1952	Lawrence Wetherby (D)	Emerson Beauchamp (D)	Charles K. O'Connell (D)	J. D. Buckman Jr. (D)	Pearl Frances Runyon (D)	T. Herbert Tinsley (D)	Ben S. Adams (D)	28D, 10R	73D, 27R	Thomas R. Underwood (D)	Earle Clements (D)	7D, 2R	Stevenson/ Sparkman (D) ✗
1953	Lawrence Wetherby (D)	Emerson Beauchamp (D)	Charles K. O'Connell (D)	J. D. Buckman Jr. (D)	Pearl Frances Runyon (D)	T. Herbert Tinsley (D)	Ben S. Adams (D)	28D, 10R	73D, 27R	John Sherman Cooper (R)	Earle Clements (D)	6D, 2R	Stevenson/ Sparkman (D) ✗
1954	Lawrence Wetherby (D)	Emerson Beauchamp (D)	Charles K. O'Connell (D)	J. D. Buckman Jr. (D)	Pearl Frances Runyon (D)	T. Herbert Tinsley (D)	Ben S. Adams (D)	29D, 9R	79D, 21R	John Sherman Cooper (R)	Earle Clements (D)	6D, 2R	Stevenson/ Sparkman (D) ✗
1955	Lawrence Wetherby (D)	Emerson Beauchamp (D)	Charles K. O'Connell (D)	J. D. Buckman Jr. (D)	Pearl Frances Runyon (D)	T. Herbert Tinsley (D)	Ben S. Adams (D)	29D, 9R	79D, 21R	Alben W. Barkley (D)	Earle Clements (D)	6D, 2R	Stevenson/ Sparkman (D) ✗
1956	Happy Chandler (D)	Harry Lee Waterfield (D)	Thelma Stovall (D)	Jo M. Ferguson (D)	Henry H. Carter (D)	Mary Louise Foust (D)	Ben J. Butler (D)	30D, 8R	77D, 23R	Robert Humphreys (D)	Earle Clements (D)	6D, 2R	Eisenhower/ Nixon (R) ✓
1957	Happy Chandler (D)	Harry Lee Waterfield (D)	Thelma Stovall (D)	Jo M. Ferguson (D)	Henry H. Carter (D)	Mary Louise Foust (D)	Ben J. Butler (D)	30D, 8R	77D, 23R	John Sherman Cooper (R)	Thruston Ballard Morton (R)	6D, 2R	Eisenhower/ Nixon (R) ✓
1958	Happy Chandler (D)	Harry Lee Waterfield (D)	Thelma Stovall (D)	Jo M. Ferguson (D)	Henry H. Carter (D)	Mary Louise Foust (D)	Ben J. Butler (D)	29D, 9R	75D, 25R	John Sherman Cooper (R)	Thruston Ballard Morton (R)	6D, 2R	Eisenhower/ Nixon (R) ✓
1959	Happy Chandler (D)	Harry Lee Waterfield (D)	Thelma Stovall (D)	Jo M. Ferguson (D)	Henry H. Carter (D)	Mary Louise Foust (D)	Ben J. Butler (D)	29D, 9R	75D, 25R	John Sherman Cooper (R)	Thruston Ballard Morton (R)	7D, 1R	Eisenhower/ Nixon (R) ✓
1960	Bert Combs (D)	Wilson W. Wyatt (D)	Henry H. Carter (D)	John B. Breckinridge (D)	Thelma Stovall (D)	Joseph W. Schneider (D)	Emerson Beauchamp (D)	30D, 8R	80D, 20R	John Sherman Cooper (R)	Thruston Ballard Morton (R)	7D, 1R	Nixon/ Lodge (R) ✗
1961	Bert Combs (D)	Wilson W. Wyatt (D)	Henry H. Carter (D)	John B. Breckinridge (D)	Thelma Stovall (D)	Joseph W. Schneider (D)	Emerson Beauchamp (D)	30D, 8R	80D, 20R	John Sherman Cooper (R)	Thruston Ballard Morton (R)	7D, 1R	Nixon/ Lodge (R) ✗
1962	Bert Combs (D)	Wilson W. Wyatt (D)	Henry H. Carter (D)	John B. Breckinridge (D)	Thelma Stovall (D)	Joseph W. Schneider (D)	Emerson Beauchamp (D)	29D, 9R	74D, 26R	John Sherman Cooper (R)	Thruston Ballard Morton (R)	7D, 1R	Nixon/ Lodge (R) ✗
1963	Bert Combs (D)	Wilson W. Wyatt (D)	Henry H. Carter (D)	John B. Breckinridge (D)	Thelma Stovall (D)	Joseph W. Schneider (D)	Emerson Beauchamp (D)	29D, 9R	74D, 26R	John Sherman Cooper (R)	Thruston Ballard Morton (R)	5D, 2R	Nixon/ Lodge (R) ✗
1964	Ned Breathitt (D)	Harry Lee Waterfield (D)	Thelma Stovall (D)	Robert F. Matthews Jr. (D)	Emerson Beauchamp (D)	Henry H. Carter (D)	Wendell P. Butler (D)	25D, 13R	63D, 37R	John Sherman Cooper (R)	Thruston Ballard Morton (R)	5D, 2R	Johnson/ Humphrey (D) ✓
1965	Ned Breathitt (D)	Harry Lee Waterfield (D)	Thelma Stovall (D)	Robert F. Matthews Jr. (D)	Emerson Beauchamp (D)	Henry H. Carter (D)	Wendell P. Butler (D)	25D, 13R	63D, 37R	John Sherman Cooper (R)	Thruston Ballard Morton (R)	6D, 1R	Johnson/ Humphrey (D) ✓
1966	Ned Breathitt (D)	Harry Lee Waterfield (D)	Thelma Stovall (D)	Robert F. Matthews Jr. (D)	Emerson Beauchamp (D)	Henry H. Carter (D)	Wendell P. Butler (D)	26D, 12R	64D, 36R	John Sherman Cooper (R)	Thruston Ballard Morton (R)	6D, 1R	Johnson/ Humphrey (D) ✓
1967	Ned Breathitt (D)	Harry Lee Waterfield (D)	Thelma Stovall (D)	Robert F. Matthews Jr. (D)	Emerson Beauchamp (D)	Henry H. Carter (D)	Wendell P. Butler (D)	26D, 12R	64D, 36R	John Sherman Cooper (R)	Thruston Ballard Morton (R)	4D, 3R	Johnson/ Humphrey (D) ✓
1968	Louie Nunn (R)	Wendell Ford (D)	Elmer Begley (R)	John B. Breckinridge (D)	Thelma Stovall (D)	Clyde Conley (R)	J. Robert Miller (R)	24D, 14R	59D, 41R	John Sherman Cooper (R)	Marlow Cook (R)	4D, 3R	Nixon/ Agnew (R) ✓
1969	Louie Nunn (R)	Wendell Ford (D)	Elmer Begley (R)	John B. Breckinridge (D)	Thelma Stovall (D)	Clyde Conley (R)	J. Robert Miller (R)	24D, 14R	59D, 41R	John Sherman Cooper (R)	Marlow Cook (R)	4D, 3R	Nixon/ Agnew (R) ✓
1970	Louie Nunn (R)	Wendell Ford (D)	Elmer Begley (R)	John B. Breckinridge (D)	Thelma Stovall (D)	James Thompson (R)	J. Robert Miller (R)	24D, 14R	71D, 29R	John Sherman Cooper (R)	Marlow Cook (R)	4D, 3R	Nixon/ Agnew (R) ✓
1970	Louie Nunn (R)	Wendell Ford (D)	Leila Feltner Begley (R)	John B. Breckinridge (D)	Thelma Stovall (D)	James Thompson (R)	J. Robert Miller (R)	24D, 14R	71D, 29R	John Sherman Cooper (R)	Marlow Cook (R)	4D, 3R	Nixon/ Agnew (R) ✓
1971	Louie Nunn (R)	Wendell Ford (D)	Kenneth F. Harper (R)	John B. Breckinridge (D)	Thelma Stovall (D)	Mary Louise Foust (D) (Note: Elected to fill vacancy.)	J. Robert Miller (R)	24D, 14R	71D, 29R	John Sherman Cooper (R)	Marlow Cook (R)	5D, 2R	Nixon/ Agnew (R) ✓
1972	Wendell Ford (D)	Julian Carroll (D)	Thelma Stovall (D)	Ed W. Hancock (D)	Drexell R. Davis (D)	Mary Louise Foust (D)	Wendell P. Butler (D)	27D, 11R	73D, 27R	John Sherman Cooper (R)	Marlow Cook (R)	5D, 2R	Nixon/ Agnew (R) ✓
1973	Wendell Ford (D)	Julian Carroll (D)	Thelma Stovall (D)	Ed W. Hancock (D)	Drexell R. Davis (D)	Mary Louise Foust (D)	Wendell P. Butler (D)	27D, 11R	73D, 27R	Walter Dee Huddleston (D)	Marlow Cook (R)	5D, 2R	Nixon/ Agnew (R) ✓
1974	Wendell Ford (D)	Julian Carroll (D)	Thelma Stovall (D)	Ed W. Hancock (D)	Drexell R. Davis (D)	Mary Louise Foust (D)	Wendell P. Butler (D)	29D, 9R	80D, 20R	Walter Dee Huddleston (D)	Marlow Cook (R)	5D, 2R	Nixon/ Agnew (R) ✓
1975	Julian Carroll (D)	vacant	Thelma Stovall (D)	Ed W. Hancock (D)	Drexell R. Davis (D)	Mary Louise Foust (D)	Wendell P. Butler (D)	29D, 9R	80D, 20R	Walter Dee Huddleston (D)	Wendell Ford (D)	5D, 2R	Nixon/ Agnew (R) ✓
1976	Julian Carroll (D)	Thelma Stovall (D)	Drexell R. Davis (D)	Robert F. Stephens (D)	Frances Jones Mills (D)	George L. Atkins (D)	Thomas O. Harris (D)	30D, 8R	79D, 21R	Walter Dee Huddleston (D)	Wendell Ford (D)	5D, 2R	Carter/ Mondale (D) ✓
1977	Julian Carroll (D)	Thelma Stovall (D)	Drexell R. Davis (D)	Robert F. Stephens (D)	Frances Jones Mills (D)	George L. Atkins (D)	Thomas O. Harris (D)	30D, 8R	79D, 21R	Walter Dee Huddleston (D)	Wendell Ford (D)	5D, 2R	Carter/ Mondale (D) ✓
1978	Julian Carroll (D)	Thelma Stovall (D)	Drexell R. Davis (D)	Robert F. Stephens (D)	Frances Jones Mills (D)	George L. Atkins (D)	Thomas O. Harris (D)	30D, 8R	78D, 22R	Walter Dee Huddleston (D)	Wendell Ford (D)	5D, 2R	Carter/ Mondale (D) ✓
1979	Julian Carroll (D)	Thelma Stovall (D)	Drexell R. Davis (D)	Robert F. Stephens (D)	Frances Jones Mills (D)	George L. Atkins (D)	Thomas O. Harris (D)	30D, 8R	78D, 22R	Walter Dee Huddleston (D)	Wendell Ford (D)	4D, 3R	Carter/ Mondale (D) ✓
1980	John Y. Brown Jr. (D)	Martha Layne Collins (D)	Frances Jones Mills (D)	Steve Beshear (D)	Drexell R. Davis (D)	James B. Graham (D)	Alben W. Barkley II (D)	29D, 9R	75D, 25R	Walter Dee Huddleston (D)	Wendell Ford (D)	4D, 3R	Reagan/ Bush (R) ✓
1981	John Y. Brown Jr. (D)	Martha Layne Collins (D)	Frances Jones Mills (D)	Steve Beshear (D)	Drexell R. Davis (D)	James B. Graham (D)	Alben W. Barkley II (D)	29D, 9R	75D, 25R	Walter Dee Huddleston (D)	Wendell Ford (D)	4D, 3R	Reagan/ Bush (R) ✓
1982	John Y. Brown Jr. (D)	Martha Layne Collins (D)	Frances Jones Mills (D)	Steve Beshear (D)	Drexell R. Davis (D)	James B. Graham (D)	Alben W. Barkley II (D)	29D, 9R	76D, 24R	Walter Dee Huddleston (D)	Wendell Ford (D)	4D, 3R	Reagan/ Bush (R) ✓
1983	John Y. Brown Jr. (D)	Martha Layne Collins (D)	Frances Jones Mills (D)	Steve Beshear (D)	Drexell R. Davis (D)	James B. Graham (D)	Alben W. Barkley II (D)	29D, 9R	76D, 24R	Walter Dee Huddleston (D)	Wendell Ford (D)	4D, 3R	Reagan/ Bush (R) ✓
1984	Martha Layne Collins (D)	Steve Beshear (D)	Drexell R. Davis (D)	David L. Armstrong (D)	Frances Jones Mills (D)	Mary Ann Tobin (D)	David Boswell (D)	28D, 10R	77D, 23R	Walter Dee Huddleston (D)	Wendell Ford (D)	4D, 3R	Reagan/ Bush (R) ✓
1985	Martha Layne Collins (D)	Steve Beshear (D)	Drexell R. Davis (D)	David L. Armstrong (D)	Frances Jones Mills (D)	Mary Ann Tobin (D)	David Boswell (D)	28D, 10R	74D, 26R (Note: Pursuant to Constitutional Amendment #2, passed in 1979, election dates for the Kentucky General Assembly were moved to even-numbered years. Only elections for the Kentucky House of Representatives were held in 1984 (having last been held in 1981), and Senators elected in the 1981 and 1983 elections served five-year terms in order to bring the dates of election into symmetry again.)	Mitch McConnell (R)	Wendell Ford (D)	4D, 3R	Reagan/ Bush (R) ✓
1986	Martha Layne Collins (D)	Steve Beshear (D)	Drexell R. Davis (D)	David L. Armstrong (D)	Frances Jones Mills (D)	Mary Ann Tobin (D)	David Boswell (D)	28D, 10R	74D, 26R	Mitch McConnell (R)	Wendell Ford (D)	4D, 3R	Reagan/ Bush (R) ✓
1987	Martha Layne Collins (D)	Steve Beshear (D)	Drexell R. Davis (D)	David L. Armstrong (D)	Frances Jones Mills (D)	Mary Ann Tobin (D)	David Boswell (D)	29D, 9R	73D, 27R	Mitch McConnell (R)	Wendell Ford (D)	4D, 3R	Reagan/ Bush (R) ✓
1988	Wallace Wilkinson (D)	Brereton C. Jones (D)	Bremer Ehrler (D)	Fred Cowan (D)	Bob Mead (D)	Bob Babbage (D)	Ward Burnette (D) (Note: Resigned shortly before impeachment trial in the Kentucky Senate following criminal conviction for theft.)	29D, 9R	71D, 29R	Mitch McConnell (R)	Wendell Ford (D)	4D, 3R	Bush/ Quayle (R) ✓
1989	Wallace Wilkinson (D)	Brereton C. Jones (D)	Bremer Ehrler (D)	Fred Cowan (D)	Bob Mead (D)	Bob Babbage (D)	Ward Burnette (D)	30D, 8R	72D, 28R	Mitch McConnell (R)	Wendell Ford (D)	4D, 3R	Bush/ Quayle (R) ✓
1990	Wallace Wilkinson (D)	Brereton C. Jones (D)	Bremer Ehrler (D)	Fred Cowan (D)	Bob Mead (D)	Bob Babbage (D)	Ward Burnette (D)	30D, 8R	71D, 29R	Mitch McConnell (R)	Wendell Ford (D)	4D, 3R	Bush/ Quayle (R) ✓
1991	Wallace Wilkinson (D)	Brereton C. Jones (D)	Bremer Ehrler (D)	Fred Cowan (D)	Bob Mead (D)	Bob Babbage (D)	Charles Hamilton (D)	27D, 11R	68D, 32R	Mitch McConnell (R)	Wendell Ford (D)	4D, 3R	Bush/ Quayle (R) ✓
1992	Brereton Jones (D)	Paul E. Patton (D)	Bob Babbage (D)	Chris Gorman (D)	Frances Jones Mills (D)	Ben Chandler (D)	Ed Logsdon (D)	27D, 11R	68D, 32R	Mitch McConnell (R)	Wendell Ford (D)	4D, 3R	Clinton/ Gore (D) ✓
1993	Brereton Jones (D)	Paul E. Patton (D)	Bob Babbage (D)	Chris Gorman (D)	Frances Jones Mills (D)	Ben Chandler (D)	Ed Logsdon (D)	25D, 13R	72D, 28R	Mitch McConnell (R)	Wendell Ford (D)	4D, 2R	Clinton/ Gore (D) ✓
1994	Brereton Jones (D)	Paul E. Patton (D)	Bob Babbage (D)	Chris Gorman (D)	Frances Jones Mills (D)	Ben Chandler (D)	Ed Logsdon (D)	24D, 14R (Note: A special election flipped one seat from Democratic to Republican following the resignation of John Arnold.)	71D, 29R	Mitch McConnell (R)	Wendell Ford (D)	3D, 3R	Clinton/ Gore (D) ✓
1995	Brereton Jones (D)	Paul E. Patton (D)	Bob Babbage (D)	Chris Gorman (D)	Frances Jones Mills (D)	Ben Chandler (D)	Ed Logsdon (D)	21D, 17R	63D, 37R	Mitch McConnell (R)	Wendell Ford (D)	4R, 2D	Clinton/ Gore (D) ✓
1996	Paul E. Patton (D)	Steve Henry (D)	John Young Brown III (D)	Ben Chandler (D)	John Kennedy Hamilton (D)	Ed Hatchett (D)	Billy Ray Smith (D)	21D, 17R	63D, 37R	Mitch McConnell (R)	Wendell Ford (D)	4R, 2D	Clinton/ Gore (D) ✓
1997	Paul E. Patton (D)	Steve Henry (D)	John Young Brown III (D)	Ben Chandler (D)	John Kennedy Hamilton (D)	Ed Hatchett (D)	Billy Ray Smith (D)	23 Coal., 15D (Note: A coalition of 5 Democrats and 18 Republicans formed to control the chamber.)	64D, 36R	Mitch McConnell (R)	Wendell Ford (D)	5R, 1D	Clinton/ Gore (D) ✓
1998	Paul E. Patton (D)	Steve Henry (D)	John Young Brown III (D)	Ben Chandler (D)	John Kennedy Hamilton (D)	Ed Hatchett (D)	Billy Ray Smith (D)	23 Coal., 15D	65D, 35R (Note: A special election flipped one seat from Republican to Democratic.)	Mitch McConnell (R)	Wendell Ford (D)	5R, 1D	Clinton/ Gore (D) ✓
1999	Paul E. Patton (D)	Steve Henry (D)	John Young Brown III (D)	Ben Chandler (D)	John Kennedy Hamilton (D)	Ed Hatchett (D)	Billy Ray Smith (D)	23 Coal., 15D	66D, 34R	Mitch McConnell (R)	Jim Bunning (R)	5R, 1D	Clinton/ Gore (D) ✓
2000	Paul E. Patton (D)	Steve Henry (D)	John Young Brown III (D)	Ben Chandler (D)	Jonathan Miller (D)	Ed Hatchett (D)	Billy Ray Smith (D)	20R, 18D (Note: Senators Dan Seum and Bob Leeper switched parties from Democratic to Republican, giving the Republicans outright majority control.)	65D, 35R	Mitch McConnell (R)	Jim Bunning (R)	5R, 1D	Bush/ Cheney (R) ✓
2001	Paul E. Patton (D)	Steve Henry (D)	John Young Brown III (D)	Ben Chandler (D)	Jonathan Miller (D)	Ed Hatchett (D)	Billy Ray Smith (D)	20R, 18D	66D, 34R	Mitch McConnell (R)	Jim Bunning (R)	5R, 1D	Bush/ Cheney (R) ✓
2002	Paul E. Patton (D)	Steve Henry (D)	John Young Brown III (D)	Ben Chandler (D)	Jonathan Miller (D)	Ed Hatchett (D)	Billy Ray Smith (D)	20R, 18D	66D, 34R	Mitch McConnell (R)	Jim Bunning (R)	5R, 1D	Bush/ Cheney (R) ✓
2003	Paul E. Patton (D)	Steve Henry (D)	John Young Brown III (D)	Ben Chandler (D)	Jonathan Miller (D)	Ed Hatchett (D)	Billy Ray Smith (D)	22R, 16D	65D, 35R	Mitch McConnell (R)	Jim Bunning (R)	5R, 1D	Bush/ Cheney (R) ✓
2004	Ernie Fletcher (R)	Steve Pence (R)	Trey Grayson (R) (Note: Resigned to accept a position at the John F. Kennedy School of Government at Harvard University.)	Greg Stumbo (D)	Jonathan Miller (D)	Crit Luallen (D)	Richie Farmer (R)	22R, 16D	64D, 36R (Note: Democratic representative Thomas Kerr switched parties.)	Mitch McConnell (R)	Jim Bunning (R)	4R, 2D	Bush/ Cheney (R) ✓
2005	Ernie Fletcher (R)	Steve Pence (R)	Trey Grayson (R)	Greg Stumbo (D)	Jonathan Miller (D)	Crit Luallen (D)	Richie Farmer (R)	21R, 15D, 1I, 1 vac. (Note: A Republican who won a Senate seat was denied the ability to take her seat over residency issues by court order; Senator Bob Leeper switched from being a Republican to an independent, but continued to caucus with the GOP.)	57D, 43R	Mitch McConnell (R)	Jim Bunning (R)	5R, 1D	Bush/ Cheney (R) ✓
2006	Ernie Fletcher (R)	Steve Pence (R)	Trey Grayson (R)	Greg Stumbo (D)	Jonathan Miller (D)	Crit Luallen (D)	Richie Farmer (R)	21R, 16D, 1I (Note: After the Republican with residency issues resigned her seat, Perry B. Clark filled the vacancy left by her in a special election.)	56D, 44R (Note: Representative James R. Carr switched to the Republican party.)	Mitch McConnell (R)	Jim Bunning (R)	5R, 1D	Bush/ Cheney (R) ✓
2007	Ernie Fletcher (R)	Steve Pence (R)	Trey Grayson (R)	Greg Stumbo (D)	Jonathan Miller (D)	Crit Luallen (D)	Richie Farmer (R)	21R, 16D, 1I	61D, 39R	Mitch McConnell (R)	Jim Bunning (R)	4R, 2D	Bush/ Cheney (R) ✓
2008	Steve Beshear (D)	Daniel Mongiardo (D)	Trey Grayson (R)	Jack Conway (D)	Todd Hollenbach (D)	Crit Luallen (D)	Richie Farmer (R)	22R, 15D, 1I (Note: A Republican, Brandon Smith, filled the vacancy left by Daniel Mongiardo when he became Lt. Governor.)	63D, 37R (Note: Two Republicans, Milward Dedman and Melvin Henley, switch parties to Democratic.)	Mitch McConnell (R)	Jim Bunning (R)	4R, 2D	McCain/ Palin (R) ✗
2009	Steve Beshear (D)	Daniel Mongiardo (D)	Trey Grayson (R)	Jack Conway (D)	Todd Hollenbach (D)	Crit Luallen (D)	Richie Farmer (R)	21R, 16D, 1I (Note: Mike Reynolds, a Democrat, filled the vacancy left by Brett Guthrie when he became a Congressman.)	65D, 35R	Mitch McConnell (R)	Jim Bunning (R)	4R, 2D	McCain/ Palin (R) ✗
2010	Steve Beshear (D)	Daniel Mongiardo (D)	Trey Grayson (R)	Jack Conway (D)	Todd Hollenbach (D)	Crit Luallen (D)	Richie Farmer (R)	20R, 17D, 1I (Note: Robin L. Webb, a Democrat, filled the vacancy left by Charlie Borders when he was appointed to the Kentucky Public Service Commission by governor Steve Beshear.)	65D, 35R	Mitch McConnell (R)	Jim Bunning (R)	4R, 2D	McCain/ Palin (R) ✗
2011	Steve Beshear (D)	Daniel Mongiardo (D)	Elaine Walker (D)	Jack Conway (D)	Todd Hollenbach (D)	Crit Luallen (D)	Richie Farmer (R)	22R, 15D, 1I	59D, 41R (Note: Rep. Wade Hurt switched parties from Republican to Democratic on April 22, 2011.)	Mitch McConnell (R)	Rand Paul (R)	4R, 2D	McCain/ Palin (R) ✗
2012	Steve Beshear (D)	Jerry Abramson (D) (Note: Resigned to accept an appointed to the position of Deputy Assistant to the President and White House Director of Intergovernmental Affairs.)	Alison Lundergan Grimes (D)	Jack Conway (D)	Todd Hollenbach (D)	Adam Edelen (D)	James Comer (R)	22R, 15D, 1I	59D, 41R	Mitch McConnell (R)	Rand Paul (R)	4R, 2D	Romney/ Ryan (R) ✗
2013	Steve Beshear (D)	Jerry Abramson (D)	Alison Lundergan Grimes (D)	Jack Conway (D)	Todd Hollenbach (D)	Adam Edelen (D)	James Comer (R)	23R, 14D, 1I	55D, 45R	Mitch McConnell (R)	Rand Paul (R)	5R, 1D	Romney/ Ryan (R) ✗
2014	Steve Beshear (D)	Jerry Abramson (D)	Alison Lundergan Grimes (D)	Jack Conway (D)	Todd Hollenbach (D)	Adam Edelen (D)	James Comer (R)	23R, 14D, 1I	54D, 46R	Mitch McConnell (R)	Rand Paul (R)	5R, 1D	Romney/ Ryan (R) ✗
2015	Steve Beshear (D)	Crit Luallen (D)	Alison Lundergan Grimes (D)	Jack Conway (D)	Todd Hollenbach (D)	Adam Edelen (D)	James Comer (R)	26R, 12D	54D, 46R	Mitch McConnell (R)	Rand Paul (R)	5R, 1D	Romney/ Ryan (R) ✗
2015	Steve Beshear (D)	Crit Luallen (D)	Alison Lundergan Grimes (D)	Jack Conway (D)	Todd Hollenbach (D)	Adam Edelen (D)	James Comer (R)	27R, 11D	54D, 46R	Mitch McConnell (R)	Rand Paul (R)	5R, 1D	Romney/ Ryan (R) ✗
2016	Matt Bevin (R)	Jenean Hampton (R)	Alison Lundergan Grimes (D)	Andy Beshear (D)	Allison Ball (R)	Mike Harmon (R)	Ryan Quarles (R)	27R, 11D	53D, 47R (Note: Two Democratic representatives (Jim Gooch Jr. and Denver Butler) switched parties to Republican in late 2015/early 2016 and Democrats picked up one seat in a set of March 2016 special elections.)	Mitch McConnell (R)	Rand Paul (R)	5R, 1D	Trump/ Pence (R) ✓
2017	Matt Bevin (R)	Jenean Hampton (R)	Alison Lundergan Grimes (D)	Andy Beshear (D)	Allison Ball (R)	Mike Harmon (R)	Ryan Quarles (R)	27R, 11D	64R, 36D	Mitch McConnell (R)	Rand Paul (R)	5R, 1D	Trump/ Pence (R) ✓
2018	Matt Bevin (R)	Jenean Hampton (R)	Alison Lundergan Grimes (D)	Andy Beshear (D)	Allison Ball (R)	Mike Harmon (R)	Ryan Quarles (R)	27R, 11D	63R, 37D	Mitch McConnell (R)	Rand Paul (R)	5R, 1D	Trump/ Pence (R) ✓
2019	Matt Bevin (R)	Jenean Hampton (R)	Alison Lundergan Grimes (D)	Andy Beshear (D)	Allison Ball (R)	Mike Harmon (R)	Ryan Quarles (R)	29R, 9D	61R, 39D	Mitch McConnell (R)	Rand Paul (R)	5R, 1D	Trump/ Pence (R) ✓
2020	Andy Beshear (D)	Jacqueline Coleman (D)	Michael Adams (R)	Daniel Cameron (R)	Allison Ball (R)	Mike Harmon (R)	Ryan Quarles (R)	28R, 10D	62R, 38D	Mitch McConnell (R)	Rand Paul (R)	5R, 1D	Trump/ Pence (R) ✗
2021	Andy Beshear (D)	Jacqueline Coleman (D)	Michael Adams (R)	Daniel Cameron (R)	Allison Ball (R)	Mike Harmon (R)	Ryan Quarles (R)	30R, 8D	75R, 25D	Mitch McConnell (R)	Rand Paul (R)	5R, 1D	Trump/ Pence (R) ✗
2022	Andy Beshear (D)	Jacqueline Coleman (D)	Michael Adams (R)	Daniel Cameron (R)	Allison Ball (R)	Mike Harmon (R)	Ryan Quarles (R)	30R, 8D	75R, 25D	Mitch McConnell (R)	Rand Paul (R)	5R, 1D	Trump/ Pence (R) ✗
2023	Andy Beshear (D)	Jacqueline Coleman (D)	Michael Adams (R)	Daniel Cameron (R)	Allison Ball (R)	Mike Harmon (R)	Ryan Quarles (R)	31R, 7D	80R, 20D	Mitch McConnell (R)	Rand Paul (R)	5R, 1D	Trump/ Pence (R) ✗
2024	Andy Beshear (D)	Jacqueline Coleman (D)	Michael Adams (R)	Russell Coleman (R)	Mark Metcalf (R)	Allison Ball (R)	Jonathan Shell (R)	31R, 7D	80R, 20D	Mitch McConnell (R)	Rand Paul (R)	5R, 1D	Trump/ Vance (R) ✓
2025	Andy Beshear (D)	Jacqueline Coleman (D)	Michael Adams (R)	Russell Coleman (R)	Mark Metcalf (R)	Allison Ball (R)	Jonathan Shell (R)	32R, 6D	80R, 20D	Mitch McConnell (R)	Rand Paul (R)	5R, 1D	Trump/ Vance (R) ✓
2026	Andy Beshear (D)	Jacqueline Coleman (D)	Michael Adams (R)	Russell Coleman (R)	Mark Metcalf (R)	Allison Ball (R)	Jonathan Shell (R)	32R, 6D	80R, 20D	Mitch McConnell (R)	Rand Paul (R)	5R, 1D	Trump/ Vance (R) ✓
2027	Andy Beshear (D)	Jacqueline Coleman (D)	Michael Adams (R)	Russell Coleman (R)	Mark Metcalf (R)	Allison Ball (R)	Jonathan Shell (R)	30R, 8D	74R, 26D	Andy Barr (R)	Rand Paul (R)	4R, 2D	Trump/ Vance (R) ✓

== See also ==
- Law and government in Kentucky
