= Secretary of state =

Type of senior civil servant in the government of a state

The title secretary of state or state's secretary (Note: This and many other government and judiciary titles are often capitalized in government documents in violation of the much more common rule in English to capitalize titles only before a name (see e.g. Chicago Manual of Style, 17th ed., 2017, sec. 8.19, 8.22), when it in fact becomes part of the name. Therefore lowercase spelling is the first or only variant recorded in some major dictionaries such as the American Heritage Dictionary, the Oxford Online Dictionaries, and the Random House Dictionary.) is commonly used for senior or mid-level posts in governments around the world. The role varies between countries, and in some cases there are multiple secretaries of state in the country's system of governing the country.

In many countries, a secretary of state is a senior or mid-level post. It is usually a politically appointed position, although in some countries, such as Germany and Sweden, it can be filled by a member of the executive bureaucracy (civil service) as a political appointment (equivalent to permanent secretary).

In the Holy See, the administrative body of the Catholic Church, the secretary of state coordinates all the departments of the Roman Curia and is, in that respect, equivalent to a prime minister.

The United States secretary of state is the foreign minister of the federal government of the United States, while in most of the individual U.S. states the secretary of state is an administrative officer responsible for certain governmental functions, often including overseeing elections, tasks which would be exercised by interior ministers or secretaries in most other nations.

The term "secretary of state" originated in early 17th century England.

== Africa ==
=== Orange Free State ===
In the Orange Free State (1854–1902) the secretary of state was the original title of the main administrative officer of the state, who worked closely with both the state president as head of state and head of government, and his cabinet, and with the Volksraad, the parliament of the Orange Free State. The title of state secretary was replaced by that of government secretary soon after the formation of the state apparatus and was thereafter never used again.

=== Portuguese-speaking African countries ===
The organization of the governments of Angola, Cape Verde, Guinea-Bissau, Mozambique and São Tome and Príncipe closely mirrors the Portuguese government model. Thus, in these countries, a secretary of state (Portuguese: secretário de Estado) is a junior minister, subordinate to a cabinet minister. Usually, the secretaries of State do not participate in the council of ministers.

In Mozambique, the role of vice-minister (Portuguese: vice-ministro) exists as an intermediate government rank between those of minister and secretary of state. The role of vice-minister also exists in the Government of Angola, but it is junior to that of secretary of state.

=== South African Republic ===
In the South African Republic the secretary of state was the main administrative officer of the State, working closely with both the State President as head of state and head of government, and the parliament of the South African Republic.

=== Liberia ===
In Liberia, from 1847 until 1972, the secretary of state was the head of the Department of State and the chief foreign policy officer of the republic, responsible for conducting diplomacy and implementing the nation's foreign affairs. The title was abolished in 1972 and replaced with the new nomenclature, minister of foreign affairs. Throughout most of Liberia's history, holders of that office usually went on to become president.

== The Americas ==
=== Argentina ===
The secretary of state (secretario de estado) in Argentina's federal government is a high official with the same rank as a minister, who is responsible directly to the president. The position must be distinguished from a "secretary," a lower position, responsible to a minister.

The official responsible for foreign policy is called minister of foreign affairs (Ministro de Relaciones Exteriores) or "Chancellor" (Canciller).

=== Brazil ===
In Brazil, a secretary of state (Portuguese: secretário de Estado or secretário estadual)—commonly referred simply as "secretary" (Portuguese: secretário)—is one of the government members of each of the Brazilian states, subordinate to the respective state governor. At state level, the Brazilian secretaries of state have functions similar to those of the ministers of the federal government.

At federal level, the officer responsible for foreign affairs, a position equivalent to that of the United States secretary of state, is the minister of foreign affairs.

=== Canada ===
The Canadian Cabinet used to have a secretary of state for external Affairs who acted as the country's foreign minister, but this position was abolished in 1993 and a new position of minister of foreign affairs was created. From 1867 to 1993, there was also a secretary of state for Canada who was a Cabinet minister whose duties varied over time but who was responsible for the Department of secretary of state until the position was abolished. Since 1993, some junior ministers have been styled secretary of state, and assigned in specific policy areas to assist Cabinet ministers. However, these junior ministers are not themselves members of Cabinet. A similar role is played by ministers of state, however ministers are members of the cabinet.

=== Mexico ===
In Mexico a secretary of state is a member of the Mexican Executive Cabinet who responds to the president of the Republic.

=== United States ===
==== Federal government ====
In the United States federal government, the secretary of state is the official responsible for executing the non-military and non-homeland security aspects of foreign policy—the analogue of the foreign secretary or foreign minister of a country that has one or the other. The U.S. secretary of state is head of the United States Department of State. The secretary of state is responsible for the administration of United States embassies and their subsidiary units throughout the world. The U.S. secretary of state has the power to remove any foreign diplomat from U.S. soil for any reason.

Six secretaries of state became presidents (Thomas Jefferson, James Madison, James Monroe, John Quincy Adams, Martin Van Buren and James Buchanan) and five won Nobel Peace Prizes (Frank Kellogg, Cordell Hull, George Marshall, Elihu Root, and Henry Kissinger).

The now long-established terms "Department ..." and "secretary of state" were preceded (for two months following the effective date of the Constitution) by the narrower title secretary of foreign affairs and the corresponding departmental name; the change reflected the addition of some miscellaneous domestic responsibilities.

The position is widely regarded as the most senior in the Cabinet. In the presidential line of succession, the secretary of state falls first among Cabinet officers, and fourth overall. The secretary of state is also, in protocol, the first Cabinet member in the order of precedence, immediately preceding any former presidents and former first ladies, who are followed by the rest of the Cabinet.

==== State government ====
In most of the individual states of the United States, the secretary of state is an administrative officer responsible for certain governmental functions. The specific powers and duties of this office depend on the constitution and laws of the particular state, but they often include responsibility for overseeing elections within the state. In the state of Oregon the secretary of state is an elected office that acts as the equivalent of a lieutenant governor in other states among many other duties. In three states (Massachusetts, Pennsylvania, and Virginia), the position is called "secretary of the commonwealth," since these states as well as Kentucky are called "commonwealths" instead of "states." In Connecticut, this office is called the "secretary of the state". In three states (Alaska, Hawaii and Utah), there is no secretary of state.

== Asia ==
=== Brunei ===
The state secretary (Setiausaha Kerajaan) was established to support the Menteri Besar in overseeing Brunei's administrative functions. The position was specifically reserved for Malay Muslims and required nomination by the Sultan. Under the 1959 Constitution, the State Secretary became the principal officer managing internal administrative affairs, ensuring departmental coordination and policy consultation. The State Secretary also held a seat in the Council of Ministers and worked alongside other key officials like the Attorney General and the State Financial Officer to implement the Sultan's executive authority. Additionally, in legal matters involving government personnel, documents signed by the State Secretary, such as those certifying employment details, were accepted as conclusive evidence in court.

=== Indonesia ===
In Indonesia, the minister-secretary of state (Menteri Sekretaris Negara) is a government official of ministerial rank who heads the Ministry of State Secretariat. The minister-secretary of state gives technical and administrative assistance to the president and vice president in running state affairs. In the president's case, the minister-secretary of state also provides assistance for the president in his role as commander-in-chief of the Indonesian National Armed Forces. In addition, the state secretary provides the president and vice president with their reports, coordinates household matters and protocols, as well as assisting in the drafting of bills and/or governmental regulations.

=== Kuwait ===
The Kuwaiti minister of foreign affairs, Dr. Sheikh Muhammad Al-Sabah Al-Salem Al-Sabah, is in charge of international relations of Kuwait, and all Kuwaiti representatives abroad. Al-Sabah is a member of the cabinet of ministers, and reports directly to Sabah Al-Ahmad Al-Jaber Al-Sabah, The Emir of Kuwait. He is also in charge of all the diplomatic representatives in Kuwait.

=== Malaysia ===
In Malaysia, the chief secretary to the government is the Malaysian secretary of state.

However, every state in Malaysia have its own state secretary, except federal territories. The secretary of state is the member of the State Executive Council, appointed by the governor (in Malacca, Penang, Sabah and Sarawak) or the sultan (except in Negeri Sembilan, appointed by the Yang DiPertuan Besar; and Perlis, appointed by the (Raja of Perlis). The state secretary is the head of the public service in their state.

=== Timor-Leste ===
Following the Portuguese model, in the government of Timor-Leste, a secretary of state (Sekretáriu Estadu in Tetum, Secretário de Estado in Portuguese) is a junior minister, subordinate to a cabinet minister. Despite being members of the Government, the Secretaries of State usually do not participate in the Council of Ministers, unless they are specially summoned for and, in this case, without right to vote.

== Europe ==
=== Belgium ===
As in France, a secretary of state in Belgium is a junior minister who is responsible to a minister or to the prime minister. For example, Vincent Van Quickenborne was a secretary of state charged with the simplification of the administration, and in this role he was accountable to the prime minister. The title "secretary of state" was created because the constitution of Belgium explicitly limits the number of ministers to fifteen (seven French-speaking ministers and seven Dutch-speaking ministers, with the prime minister being officially "linguistically neutral"). Therefore, appointing people as secretaries of state allows the government to circumvent this constitutional limitation. See Current list of secretaries of states for Belgian Federal Government.

There are also three secretaries of state in the government of the Brussels-Capital Region, one of whom has to be Flemish.

=== Estonia ===
The secretary of state (Riigisekretär) directs the Government Office. Its mission is to support the Government of Estonia and the prime minister of Estonia in policy drafting and implementation. It also supports any Ministers without portfolio and helps to ensure good governance. The first secretary of state was Karl Terras. Before the Soviet re-occupation in 1944, the State Secretary went into exile until the position came back to Estonia in 1992.

=== Finland ===
A state secretary (Finnish: valtiosihteeri), is the highest official below each minister. Ministers, who lead ministries (government departments), comprise the Finnish Government. Each state secretary is appointed for the term of the minister and is responsible to the minister.

This is a new arrangement; during the introduction of this model, a secretary was called "political state secretary" (poliittinen valtiosihteeri). In contrast, previously only two ministries, Ministries of Finance and Foreign Affairs, used to have state secretaries, who were permanently appointed. One such example is Raimo Sailas.

=== France ===
In France, a secretary of state (Secrétaire d'État) is a junior minister, responsible to a minister or the prime minister. It is not to be confused with the Minister of State title given to a senior French cabinet minister of particular importance.

Under the Ancien Régime, Secretaries of State were Crown officers whose responsibilities were similar to those of today's governmental ministers.

=== Germany ===
The German Staatssekretär is a Beamter (civil servant) who ranks second only to the minister in a state or federal ministry, so the position is equivalent to that of Permanent secretary in the United Kingdom, not to that of a U.K. secretary of state. While officially it is not a political office, often it is assigned by appointment based on political criteria such as party affiliation, rather than by career progression as a civil servant. Nevertheless, Staatssekretäre function as the administrative heads of ministries. They depend on the full confidence of their respective ministers and can at any time be posted into provisional retirement with their pension paid in full. This happens usually when the government or the minister changes. De facto such a provisional retirement is lifelong.

A special case is the Parliamentary State Secretary (Parlamentarischer Staatssekretär), who is a member of parliament who is appointed to a ministry as a Staatssekretär; in the German Foreign Office and the German Chancellery the official title is Staatsminister (Minister of State). Critics claim that parliamentary secretaries of state are usually given little to no influence and responsibility within their ministry, all the while drawing very generous pay due to receiving two salaries, both as a secretary of state and as a member of parliament. For example, when interviewed in 2005 about his post as a parliamentary minister of state in the German Foreign Office (1998–2002) during an investigation into visa abuse, Ludger Volmer claimed that he had been cut off from the workflow within the ministry, and called the Staatsminister office an "Unding" (absurdity).

In 1998, chancellor Gerhard Schröder introduced the new office of Federal Government Commissioner for Culture and the Media (German: Beauftragter der Bundesregierung für Kultur und Medien) at the formal rank of a Parlamentarischer Staatssekretär, hence the office is usually called Kulturstaatsminister ("State Minister of Culture") for short – although some of the incumbents did not hold a seat in parliament. The German Parliamentary Commission for Culture and the Media (German: Ausschuss für Kultur und Medien) serves in place of a proper ministry for this department.

=== Greece ===
In Greece, the title "secretary of state" (Greek: Γραμματεύς της Επικρατείας) was used only intermittently during the early years of the modern Greek state. It was first employed for the head of the cabinet under the governorship of Ioannis Kapodistrias, a post held successively by Spyridon Trikoupis (1828–29) and Nikolaos Spiliadis (1829–31). It was then abandoned, until used instead of the title of "Minister" (Υπουργός) for the cabinet members in the 1835–37 Cabinet of Josef Ludwig von Armansperg, with Armansperg being designated "Chief secretary of state" (Αρχιγραμματεύς της Επικρατείας).

=== Holy See ===
The secretary of state of His Holiness The Pope, or Cardinal secretary of state, presides over the Secretariat of State, which is the most important dicastery of the Roman Curia, as it organizes, makes appointments to, and directs the activities of the other dicasteries. The secretariat is also responsible for the Holy See's foreign relations. During a sede vacante, the former secretary of state (the appointment expires when the pope dies or resigns) assumes some of the functions of the head of state as a part of a temporary commission.

=== Luxembourg ===
Luxembourgian Secretaries of State (French: secrétaire d'Etat, Luxembourgish: Staatssekretär(in), German: Staatssekretär(in)) are members of the cabinet, and are ranked below ministers. They are given specific briefs, covering the same briefs as the ministers, and help to assist their respective ministers to perform their functions. They often hold more than one brief or assist more than one minister. In the first Juncker-Asselborn cabinet, there was one secretary of state, Octavie Modert, who is responsible for Relations with Parliament; Agriculture, Viticulture, and Rural Development; and Culture, Higher Education, and Research. There had been two in the previous cabinet, and three between 1984 and 1989.

=== Netherlands ===
As in France and Belgium, a state secretary (Dutch: staatssecretaris) in the Netherlands is a junior minister who is responsible to a Cabinet Minister or the prime minister. Some of them may, in specific circumstances, call themselves Minister when visiting a foreign country. Each State Secretary has a certain portfolio, which is different to their Cabinet Minister to split up the responsibilities and relieve the workload.

The top civil servant in a government department is called Secretary-General (secretaris-generaal).

=== Norway ===
A statssekretær in Norway plays more or less the same role as the French or Swedish equivalent. Secretaries of state are connected to specific ministry, and serve as a de facto vice minister. However, the state secretary cannot attend a Council of State and the only minister is constitutionally responsible for all the statssekretær's decisions in office.

=== Poland ===
In Poland, the ministries are staffed by secretaries of state and undersecretaries of state, commonly referred to as deputy ministers. Their task is to assist the Minister and replace him if necessary.

=== Portugal ===
In Portugal, a secretary of state (Portuguese: secretário de Estado, masculine; secretária de Estado, feminine; secretários de Estado, plural) is a junior minister, of intermediate rank between that of cabinet minister and that of under-secretary of State. Although having the Constitutional status of Government members, the secretaries of State do not usually participate in the Council of Ministers, unless summoned for certain meetings and, in those cases, without right to vote. They act merely as deputies of ministers, having only the powers delegated to them by their ministers or directly by the prime minister.

Until the reorganization of the Portuguese Public Administration structure in 2004, it was common for a secretary of State to be in charge of a secretariat of State (Portuguese: secretaria de Estado), a Government department with a status below that of a ministry. A secretariat of State could be organized as a division of a ministry or occasionally be directly subordinate to the prime minister. For example, from 1987 to 1995, a Secretariat of State for the Culture existed directly subordinate to the prime minister. Despite this type of department no longer officially existing in the organization of the Portuguese Government, it is still common usage for the portfolio of a secretary of State to be colloquially referred to as a "secretariat of State".

Historically, since the 17th century, the title of "secretary of State" was used to designate the heads of the Government departments of Portugal. In the 19th century, the title of "minister" started to be used, the official complete title of each of the ministers becoming "minister and secretary of State" of a given portfolio until the end of the Monarchy in 1910. From them on, the title "minister" completely replaced that of "secretary of State" (with the exception of the brief presidential system that existed during 1918, in which the ministers were re-titled "secretaries of State"). In 1958, the title of "secretary of State" was reintroduced to designate the then created role of a junior minister, subordinate to a cabinet minister.

In the devolved governments of the Autonomous Regions (the Azores and Madeira), cabinet members are called "Regional Secretary" of a given portfolio (Portuguese: Secretário Regional), and the head of the cabinet is titled "President of the Regional Government" (Portuguese: Presidente do Governo Regional).

=== Russia ===
The position of state secretary (Russian: Статс-секретарь, romanized: Stats-sekretar or Russian: Государственный секретар, romanized: Gosudarstvennyj sekretar) has existed at certain periods of time. Boris Yeltsin revived the post in 1991.

- In the Russian Empire State secretaries of the Russian Empire (Russian: Государственные секретари Российской империи, romanized: Gosudarstvennye sekretari Rossijskoj imperii) operated in the State Chancellery from 1810 to 1917.
  - Count Karl Nesselrode, state secretary in 1814, Foreign Minister from 1816 to 1856
  - M. de Freigang sometime in the 1820–1828 time period
  - Sergei Witte 1903–1905
- In the Russian Federation:
  - Gennady Burbulis, Gosudarstvennyj sekretar May to November 1992
  - Grigory Karasin, Russian: Статс-секретарь-Заместитель министра иностранных дел Российской Федерации, romanized: Stats-sekretar-Zamestitel ministra inostrannykh del Rossijskoj Federatsii 2005–2019

=== San Marino ===
In the Republic of San Marino a secretary of state is a senior cabinet minister in charge of a department of state. Secretaries of state are members of the Congress of State.

=== Spain ===
In present-day organisation of the Spanish Government a secretary of state (Spanish: Secretario de Estado) is a junior minister. Each ministry may have one or several secretaries of state. For example, the secretary of state for press in the Office of the Prime Minister and the secretary of state for Ibero-America in the Ministry of Foreign Affairs.

Before 1705, a secretary of state was an official of the Council of State, who acted as an administrative officer and as a liaison between the Crown and the Council. After the division of the post of Secretary of the Universal Office (Spanish: Secretario del Despacho Universal, kind of a prime minister) in 1705, it successors were known as Secretaries of the Office [of State, of War, of Finance, of the Navy, etc] and were granted the same honors and title that the secretaries of the Council of State, so their complete name was Secretaries of State and of the Office (Spanish: Secretarios de Estado y del Despacho), and they were the heads of different government departments. The secretary of state and of the Office of State, today known as minister of foreign affairs, usually served as Chief Minister (See List of foreign ministers of Spain and List of prime ministers of Spain).

=== Sweden ===
In Sweden, a state secretary (Swedish: Statssekreterare) is a political appointee, second in rank to the minister (Swedish: Statsråd) in charge of the ministry. Unlike ministers, state secretaries are not members of the cabinet. Typically, there is one state secretary assigned for each minister in the cabinet, and two for the prime minister. For historical reasons, the state secretary in the Ministry for Foreign Affairs has another title (Swedish: Kabinettssekreterare, in English literally "cabinet secretary"). State secretaries tend to, more often than the ministers do, hail from a fixed civil servant background or a professional background relevant to the area of responsibility that belongs to their respective ministries.

=== Switzerland ===
In the Swiss federal administration, secretaries of state are the most senior career officials. The title is conferred by the Swiss Federal Council on heads of federal offices whose duties entail independent interaction with senior foreign authorities (cf. article 46 of the Government and Administration Organisation Act). In practice, the function of a secretary of state is the same as in France.

=== United Kingdom ===
==== Historical origin ====
In the Kingdom of England, before 1660, an office entitled secretary of state came into being near the end of the reign of Queen Elizabeth I (1558–1603), the usual title before that having been King's Clerk, King's Secretary, or Principal Secretary. From 1540 there were sometimes two such secretaries.

From 1660 there were always two secretaries of state, between whom oversight of foreign affairs was divided on a geographical basis while domestic affairs were shared: the northern secretary and the southern secretary. In 1707, England and Scotland were merged into the Kingdom of Great Britain, and there was a third secretary of state for Scotland until 1746. A third secretary of state for the Colonies existed from 1768. In 1782 a system reform resulted in reverting to having two secretaries of state: a home secretary (including colonial affairs) and a foreign secretary, with the addition of a third for War from 1794. The title of under secretary came into use over the same period.

The United Kingdom was formed by the union of the Kingdom of Great Britain and the Kingdom of Ireland in 1801. By a gradual process between then and the 1960s, most of the ministers of the British cabinet became secretaries of state.

==== Modern role ====
In the United Kingdom, a secretary of state is a senior minister, normally in charge of a government department. Secretaries of state are appointed directly by the monarch on the advice of the prime minister, and are responsible, along with other Cabinet members, for the collective government of the United Kingdom. There are a number of secretaries of state, each of whom are formally titled "His Majesty's principal secretary of state for ..."; legislation generally refers only to "the secretary of state".
