= Samuel Churchill =

Samuel Churchill may refer to:

- Samuel J. Churchill (1842–1932), American Civil War soldier and Medal of Honor recipient
- Samuel B. Churchill (1812–1890), American attorney and politician in Kentucky, and in Missouri
