= Senator Blackburn (disambiguation) =

Marsha Blackburn (born 1952) is a U.S. Senator from Tennessee.

Senator Blackburn may also refer to:

- James W. Blackburn (1841–1915), Kentucky State Senate
- Joseph Clay Stiles Blackburn (1838–1918), U.S. Senator from Kentucky
- W. Jasper Blackburn (1820–1899), Louisiana State Senate
