= Andrew James =

Andrew James may refer to:

- Andrew J. James (1817–1883), American lawyer and state representative from Kentucky
- Butch James (Andrew David James, born 1979), South African rugby union player
- Andrew James, pen name used by James Kirkup (1918–2009), English poet, translator and travel writer
- Andy James, guitarist with Five Finger Death Punch
