= Secretary of State of Kentucky =

Constitutional officer of the U.S. state of Kentucky

- Seal of Kentucky

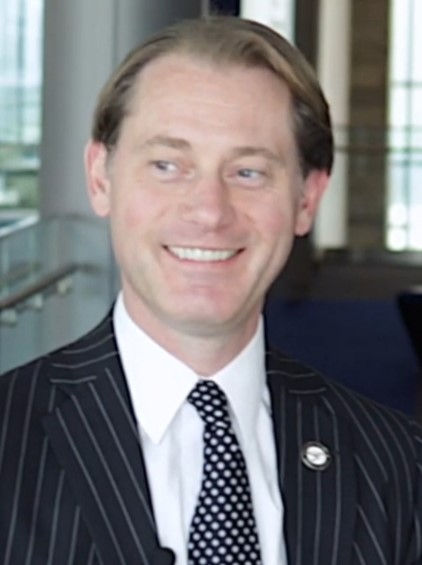
- Incumbent; Michael Adams since January 6, 2020
- Term length: 4 years
- Inaugural holder: James Brown; June 5, 1792
- Formation: Kentucky Constitution; 1792
- Salary: $124,113.60
- Website: sos.ky.gov

The secretary of state of Kentucky is one of the constitutional officers of the U.S. state of Kentucky. It is an elected office, but was an appointed office prior to 1891. The incumbent secretary of state is Republican Michael Adams, who was elected on November 5, 2019; he took office on January 6, 2020.

== History and name of position ==
Despite the fact that Kentucky designates itself a commonwealth, the office itself is still referred to as "Secretary of State" (unlike Virginia, Massachusetts and Pennsylvania, which refer to the office as "Secretary of the Commonwealth"). The office was created by Article II, Section 17 of the Kentucky Constitution of 1792 simply as "the secretary". Article III, Section 21, of the Kentucky Constitution of 1850 changed the title of the office to Secretary of State.

Section 91 of the Kentucky Constitution of 1891 (the most recent state constitution), changed the method by which the secretary of state is selected. Prior to 1891, the secretary was appointed by the governor; under the present Constitution, the secretary of state is elected by the qualified voters of the state. The most recent election was in 2023. In 1992, the Constitution was amended to allow the secretary of state to serve two successive terms.

Emma Guy Cromwell ran for the office of Secretary of State, defeating another woman, Mary Elliott Flanery, and two men in the 1923 Democratic primary. In the general election, Cromwell went on to defeat her Republican opponent, Eleanor Wickliffe. She was sworn in on January 10, 1924, and became the first woman elected to statewide office in Kentucky.

== Structure and duties of the office ==
The secretary of state's office is composed of five divisions:

- The Business Services Division is responsible for maintaining records regarding creation and status of corporations and business entities, registration of trademarks and service marks, recording liens made pursuant to the Uniform Commercial Code.
- The Elections Division certifies the name, party affiliation and ballot position of all candidates filed with him to the appropriate county clerks for ballot printing. The actual administration of elections is conducted by a separate, independent agency, the Kentucky State Board of Elections, of which the secretary of state serves as chair.
- The Administrative Services Division appoints notaries public, issues apostilles, and serves as the registered agent for service of process in cases involving foreign corporations, as well as service of summons and petitions in actions against non-resident motorists.
- The Kentucky Land Office is an archive of land patents and land grants dating back to the colonial era.
- The Executive Branch of the Office of the Secretary of State files and maintains legislation passed by the Kentucky General Assembly and executive orders of the governor of Kentucky, including appointments to the Order of Kentucky Colonels. This division is also the keeper of the Seal of the Commonwealth of Kentucky and the personal seal of the secretary of state.

== List of secretaries of state of Kentucky ==
#	Image	Name	Term of office	Party
1		James Brown	1792–1796	Democratic-Republican
2		Harry Toulmin	1796–1804	Democratic-Republican
3		John Rowan	1804–1807	Democratic-Republican
4		Alfred W. Grayson	1807–1808	
5		William C. Greenup	1808	
6		Jesse Bledsoe	1808–1812	Democratic-Republican
7		Fielding Winlock	1812	
8		Martin D. Hardin	1812	Democratic-Republican
9		Christopher Greenup	1813	Democratic-Republican
10		Martin D. Hardin	1813–1816	Democratic-Republican
11		Charles Stewart Todd	1816	Democratic-Republican
12		John Pope	1816–1819	Democratic-Republican
13		Oliver G. Waggener	1819–1820	
14		Cabell Breckinridge	1820–1823	Democratic-Republican
15		Thomas Bell Monroe	1823–1824	Democratic-Republican
16		William T. Barry	1824–1825	Democratic-Republican
17		James C. Pickett	1825–1828	Democratic-Republican
18		George Robertson	1828	Democratic-Republican
19		Thomas T. Crittenden	1828–1832	
20		John F. McCurdy	1832	
21		Lewis Sanders	1832–1834	
22		John Jordan Crittenden	1834–1835	National Republican
23		William Owsley	1835–1836	National Republican
24		Austin P. Cox	1836	
25		James M. Bullock	1836–1840	
26		James Harlan	1840–1844	Whig
27		Benjamin Hardin	1844–1846	Whig
28		George B. Kinkead	1846–1847	Whig
29		William Decatur Reed	1847–1848	Whig
30		Orlando Brown	1848–1849	Whig
31		Joshua Fry Bell	1849–1850	Whig
32		John William Finnell	1850–1851	Whig
33		David Meriwether	1851–1852	Democratic
34		James P. Metcalfe	1852–1854	Democratic
35		Grant Green	1854–1855	Democratic
36		Mason Brown	1855–1859	American
37		Thomas Bell Monroe Jr.	1859–1861	Democratic
38		Nathaniel Gaither	1861–1862	Democratic
39		Daniel C. Wickliffe	1862–1863	Democratic
40		Ephraim L. Van Winkle	1863–1866	
41		John S. Van Winkle	1866–1867	
42		Samuel B. Churchill	1867–1871	Democratic
43		Andrew Jackson James	1871–1872	Democratic
44		George Washington Craddock	1872–1875	Democratic
45		J. Stoddard Johnston	1875–1879	Democratic
46		Samuel B. Churchill	1879–1880	Democratic
47		James W. Blackburn	1880–1883	Democratic
48		James A. McKenzie	1883–1887	Democratic
49		George Madison Adams	1887–1891	Democratic
50		Willis Lunsford Ringo	1891	Democratic
51		John W. Headley	1891–1896	Democratic
52		Charles Finley	1896–1899	Republican
53		John W. Headley	1899	Democratic
54		Charles Finley	1899	Republican
55		Caleb Powers	1899–1900	Republican
56		Caleb Breckinridge Hill	1900–1904	Democratic
57		Harry V. McChesney	1904–1908	Democratic
58		Ben L. Bruner	1908–1912	Republican
59		Carl F. Crecelius	1912–1916	Democratic
60		James P. Lewis	1916–1920	Republican
61		Fred A. Vaughn	1920–1924	Republican
62		Emma Guy Cromwell	1924–1928	Democratic
63		Ella Lewis	1928–1932	Democratic
64		Sara Mahan	1932–1936	Democratic
65		Charles D. Arnett	1936–1940	Democratic
66		George G. Hatcher	1940–1944	Democratic
67		Charles K. O'Connell	1944–1948	Democratic
68		George G. Hatcher	1948–1952	Democratic
69		Charles K. O'Connell	1952–1956	Democratic
70		Thelma Stovall	1956–1960	Democratic
71		Henry H. Carter	1960–1964	Democratic
72		Thelma Stovall	1964–1968	Democratic
73		Elmer Begley	1968–1970	Republican
74		Leila Feltner Begley	1970–1971	Republican
75		Kenneth F. Harper	1971–1972	Republican
76		Thelma Stovall	1972–1976	Democratic
77		Drexell R. Davis	1976–1980	Democratic
78		Frances Jones Mills	1980–1984	Democratic
79		Drexell R. Davis	1984–1988	Democratic
80		Bremer Ehrler	1988–1992	Democratic
81		Bob Babbage	1992–1996	Democratic
82		John Young Brown III	1996–2004	Democratic
83		Trey Grayson	2004–2011	Republican
84		Elaine Walker	2011–2012	Democratic
85		Alison Lundergan Grimes	2012–2020	Democratic
86		Michael Adams	2020–present	Republican

== See also ==
- Kentucky Attorney General
