= Fielding Winlock =

American politician

Fielding Winlock was an American politician who served as the 7th Secretary of State of Kentucky from July to September 1812.
