= Cabinet of Josef Ludwig von Armansperg =

- 5th Cabinet of Kingdom of Greece
- 1835 - 1837
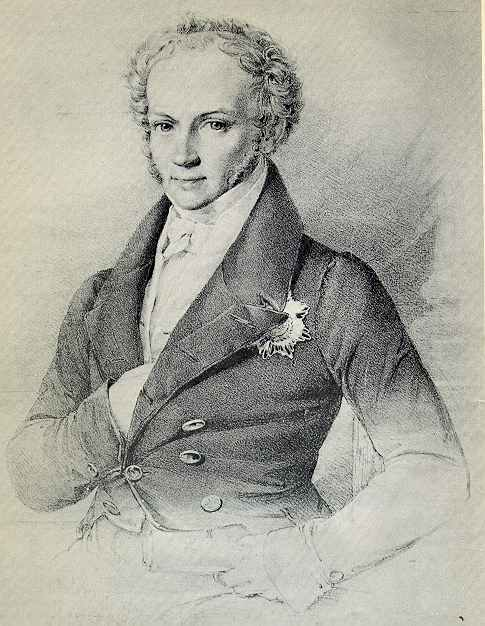
- Date formed: 20 May 1835
- Date dissolved: 2 February 1837

People and organisations
- Monarch: Otto of Greece - (Regency council of Otto of Greece)
- Prime Minister: Josef Ludwig von Armansperg
- Prime Minister's history: President of the Regency council

The Cabinet of Josef Ludwig von Armansperg (20 May 1835 – 2 February 1837) was formed after the fall of the government of Ioannis Kolettis on 20 May 1835.

== Members of the Cabinet ==
- Count Josef Ludwig von Armansperg, Chief Secretary of State, Regent of Greece
- Iakovos Rizos Neroulos, Secretary of State and Secretary for Foreign and Religious Affairs
- Nikolaos Theocharis, Secretary for Finance
- Georgios Praidis, Secretary for Justice
- Heinrich Christian von Schmaltz, Secretary for Military and Naval Affairs

On 14 February 1836, the government changed

- Drosos Mansolas, Secretary of State for the Interior
- Iakovos Rizos Neroulos, Secretary of State for the Royal Household, the Foreign Affairs, the Religious Affairs and Public Education, interim secretary of State for Justice
- Antonios Kriezis, Secretary of State for Naval Affairs (member of the English Party)
- Georgios Lassanis, Secretary of State for Finance
- Heinrich Christian von Schmaltz, Secretary of State for Military Affairs

In 1836, the government changed the administrative division of Greece.
