= Andrew J. James =

Attorney General of Kentucky

Secretary of State of Kentucky
- In office 1871–1872
- Preceded by: Samuel B. Churchill
- Succeeded by: George Washington Craddock

Attorney General of Kentucky
- In office 1859–1863
- Preceded by: James Harlan
- Succeeded by: John Marshall Harlan

Member of the Kentucky House of Representatives from Pulaski County
- In office August 6, 1855 – August 3, 1857
- Preceded by: John Griffin Jr.
- Succeeded by: Milton E. Jones

Personal details
- Born: June 14, 1817 Pulaski County, Kentucky, United States
- Died: April 4, 1883 (aged 65) Fayette County, Kentucky, United States
- Spouse: Mary Allison Beattie
- Children: 8
- Parent(s): Daniel F. James and Eleanor Evans

Andrew Jackson James (June 14, 1817 – April 4, 1883) was an American lawyer and state representative, who served as Attorney General of Kentucky and as Secretary of State of Kentucky. Before becoming Attorney General, he served as a state representative of Pulaski County, Kentucky.

== Early life ==
James was born June 14, 1817, in Pulaski County, Kentucky, near Somerset, to Daniel F. James and Eleanor James. He had three brothers and five sisters.

== Personal life ==
James married Mary A. Beattie on March 16, 1841, and together they had eight children. Two of his sons, John and Daniel James, were also attorneys.

== Career ==
James was made clerk of Pulaski County from the age of fifteen where he served until he was twenty-one. He then started his law practice in Somerset. He was a candidate for elector for Martin Van Buren in 1840. James was elected to represent Pulaski County in the Kentucky House of Representatives in 1855 and served until 1856. He was elected to the position of state Attorney General in 1859, and then in 1871, he was appointed as Secretary of State and served one year in the administration of Governor Preston H. Leslie, 1871–72. He resigned due to health and private business reasons and was succeeded by George W. Craddock. He practiced in Frankfort until two years before his death in 1883.

== Death ==
He died April 4, 1883, on his farm in Fayette County from tuberculosis aged 67. He was survived by his wife and six of his children and was buried in Frankfort Cemetery.
