= James A. McKenzie =

American politician (1840–1904)

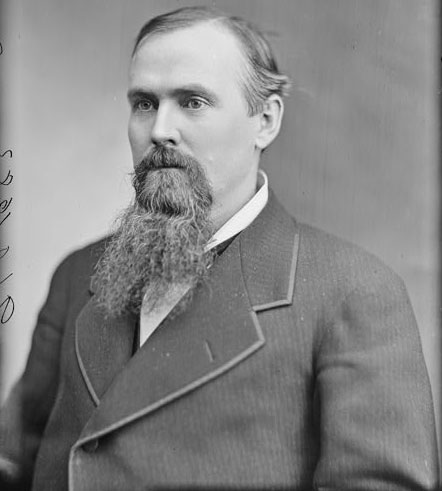
- McKenzie, 1865–1880

Member of the U.S. House of Representatives from Kentucky's 2nd district
- In office March 4, 1877 – March 3, 1883
- Preceded by: John Y. Brown
- Succeeded by: James Franklin Clay

48th Secretary of State of Kentucky
- In office September 5, 1883 – August 30, 1887
- Governor: J. Proctor Knott
- Preceded by: James W. Blackburn
- Succeeded by: George Madison Adams

United States Ambassador to Peru
- In office June 24, 1893 – April 13, 1897
- Preceded by: John Hicks
- Succeeded by: Irving B. Dudley

Member of the Kentucky House of Representatives from Christian County
- In office August 5, 1867 – August 7, 1871
- Preceded by: George Poindexter
- Succeeded by: Walter Evans

Personal details
- Born: August 1, 1840 Bennettstown, Kentucky
- Died: June 25, 1904 (aged 63) Oak Grove, Kentucky
- Resting place: Fairview Cemetery
- Party: Democratic
- Spouse: Amelia C. Parish Blakey
- Relations: Uncle of John McKenzie Moss
- Education: Centre College
- Profession: Lawyer

Military service
- Allegiance: United States; Confederate States
- Branch/service: Confederate States Army
- Rank: Private
- Battles/wars: American Civil War

James Andrew McKenzie (August 1, 1840 – June 25, 1904) was a U.S. representative from Kentucky and uncle of John McKenzie Moss.

Born in Bennettstown, Kentucky, McKenzie attended the common schools of Christian County and Centre College, Danville, Kentucky. He studied law and admitted to the bar in 1861, and commenced practice in Hopkinsville, Kentucky. McKenzie also engaged in agricultural pursuits during this time.

During the Civil War he served as a private in the Confederate States Army.

Following the war, he served as member of the Kentucky House of Representatives from 1867 to 1871. McKenzie later was elected as a Democrat to the Forty-fifth, Forty-sixth, and Forty-seventh United States Congresses (March 4, 1877 – March 3, 1883). He was an unsuccessful candidate for renomination in 1882.

McKenzie then served as Secretary of State of Kentucky under Governor J. Proctor Knott from 1884 to 1888 and as commissioner from Kentucky to the World's Columbian Exposition at Chicago, Illinois in 1893. In that same year, he was appointed Minister to Peru by President Grover Cleveland.

He resigned and settled on his farm near Long View, Kentucky. He died at Oak Grove, Kentucky, on June 25, 1904. He was interred in Fairview Cemetery, Bowling Green, Kentucky.

Journalist and Toledo mayor Brand Whitlock described McKenzie as a colorful figure renowned for his flowery style of speaking:

He was tall and spare of frame, and his long moustache and goatee, and the great black slouch hat he wore made him in appearance the typical southerner of the popular imagination. **** He was fond of striking phrases; he it was who had referred to Blaine as a Florentine mosaic; and his reference to Mrs. Cleveland as “the uncrowned queen of America” had delighted the Democratic convention at St. Louis which renominated her husband for the presidency. And again at Chicago, on that memorable night of oratory in 1892 in seconding the nomination of Cleveland on behalf of Kentucky he stood on a chair and referred to his state as the commonwealth “in which, thank God, the damned lie is the first lick, where the women are so beautiful that the aurora borealis blushes with shame, where the whiskey is so good as to make intoxication a virtue, and the horses so fleet that lightning in comparison is but a puling paralytic.”

U.S. House of Representatives
Preceded by John Y. Brown	Member of the U.S. House of Representatives from Kentucky's 2nd congressional district March 4, 1877–March 3, 1883	Succeeded by James Franklin Clay
Political offices
Preceded by James W. Blackburn	Secretary of State of Kentucky; 1883–1887	Succeeded by George M. Adams
Diplomatic posts
Preceded by John Hicks	United States Minister to Peru; 24 June 1893–13 April 1897	Succeeded by Irving B. Dudley
