= Fred A. Vaughn =

American educator, attorney, and politician (1876–1927)

61st Secretary of State of Kentucky
- In office January 5, 1920 – January 7, 1924
- Governor: Edwin P. Morrow; William J. Fields
- Preceded by: James P. Lewis
- Succeeded by: Emma Guy Cromwell

County Judge of Johnson County
- In office January 5, 1914 – January 1920

Member of the Kentucky House of Representatives from the 96th district
- In office January 1, 1904 – January 1, 1906
- Preceded by: William T. Stafford
- Succeeded by: William T. Cain

Personal details
- Born: December 8, 1876 Paintsville, Kentucky, U.S.
- Died: January 21, 1927 (aged 50) Paintsville, Kentucky, U.S.
- Resting place: Mayo Cemetery, Paintsville, Kentucky
- Party: Republican
- Spouse: Mary Muir Halstead (m. 1914)
- Parent(s): H.S. Vaughn; Mary E. Burgess
- Education: University of Kentucky; George Washington University

Fred A. Vaughn (December 8, 1876 – January 21, 1927) was an American educator, attorney, and politician who served as Secretary of State of Kentucky from 1920 to 1924. He also served as a member of the Kentucky House of Representatives from 1904 to 1906 and Judge/Executive of Johnson County, Kentucky from 1913 to 1920. He was a member of the Republican Party.

== Early life and education ==
Fred A. Vaughn was born on December 8, 1876, in Paintsville, Johnson County, Kentucky, as the fifth child of H.S. Vaughn, a local politician, and Mary E. Burgess. He received a common education from Paintsville public schools. He attended the University of Kentucky and learned law at George Washington University in Washington, D.C. He then taught as a teacher at the Big Sandy Valley Seminary for 10 years. He married Mary Muir Halstead in 1914, they had no children.

== Career ==
In 1904, Vaughn was elected a member of the Kentucky House of Representatives from Johnson and Martin counties. He served for one term from 1904 to 1906, when he was appointed chairman of the Republican campaign committee in Kentucky's 10th congressional district, which elected John W. Langley to serve as representative that year. He also served as Langley's assistant in Washington D.C. until 1909. For the next 10 years, he worked for the United States Census Bureau.

In 1913, Vaughn was elected Judge/Executive of Johnson County, Kentucky, and was re-elected in 1917. In 1919, he ran for secretary of state of Kentucky against Matt S. Cohen. Vaughn defeated Cohen taking 5,302 votes to Cohen's 5,136 votes. After being elected secretary of state, Vaughn resigned from his position as judge of Johnson County, in order to take on full duties as secretary of state. He served as secretary of state for four years from 1920 to 1924 under governors Edwin P. Morrow and William J. Fields. He also served in a variety of positions on several different school boards. He served on the Board of Regents of Eastern Kentucky University for 10 years.

After leaving office, Vaughn worked as a receiver for the Ohio Valley Fire and Marine Insurance Company. He also practiced law in Frankfort, Kentucky for several years, and in 1926, he moved back to Paintsville to practice law there. He also planned to run for judge of the 24th Judicial District.

== Death ==
Vaughn died on the morning of January 21, 1927, in Paintsville, Kentucky, at the age of 50. He died of a stroke caused by high blood pressure. He was buried at the Mayo Cemetery in Paintsville, Kentucky.
