= Samuel J. Churchill =

- Born: November 1, 1842; Rutland, Vermont
- Died: June 3, 1932 (aged 89); Lawrence, Kansas
- Military career
- Allegiance: United States of America
- Branch: United States Army
- Service years: 1861–1865
- Rank: Corporal
- Unit: Battery G, 2nd Regiment Illinois Volunteer Light Artillery
- Conflicts: Battle of Nashville
- Awards: Medal of Honor

Corporal Samuel Joseph Churchill (November 1, 1842 – June 3, 1932) was an American soldier who fought in the American Civil War. Churchill received the country's highest award for bravery during combat, the Medal of Honor, for his action during the Battle of Nashville in Tennessee on 15 December 1864. He was honored with the award on 20 January 1897.

== Biography ==
Churchill was born in Rutland, Vermont on November 1, 1842. He enlisted into Battery G, 2nd Illinois Light Artillery at DeKalb County, Illinois. During his veteran furlough, he returned to Vermont where he married Adelia Augusty Holmes on May 4, 1863. When he returned to his battery shortly thereafter, he was promoted to the position of corporal. After the war, he moved to Lee's Summit, Missouri and then Lawrence, Kansas. In 1901, Churchill wrote Genealogy and Biography of the Connecticut Branch of the Churchill Family in America in which he recounts his Civil War experiences. Churchill died on 3 June 1932 and his remains are interred at the Oak Hill Cemetery in Lawrence, Kansas. The Lawrence, Kansas Army Reserve Training Center is named in his honor.

== See also ==
- List of American Civil War Medal of Honor recipients: A–F
