= James W. Blackburn =

47th Secretary of State of Kentucky

47th Secretary of State of Kentucky
- In office May 6, 1880 – September 4, 1883
- Governor: Luke P. Blackburn
- Preceded by: Samuel B. Churchill
- Succeeded by: James A. McKenzie

Member of the Kentucky Senate from the 22nd district
- In office August 2, 1875 – May 6, 1880
- Preceded by: William P. Duvall
- Succeeded by: S. M. Davis

Personal details
- Born: April 30, 1841 Woodford County, Kentucky, U.S.
- Died: December 14, 1915 (aged 74) Buffalo, New York
- Party: Democratic
- Spouse: Henrietta
- Relations: Luke P. Blackburn (brother); J. C. S. Blackburn (brother)
- Children: 4
- Parent(s): Edward "Ned" Blackburn; Lavinia Bell

Military service
- Allegiance: Confederate States of America
- Years of service: 1861–1865

James W. Blackburn (April 30, 1841 – December 14, 1915) was an American politician who served as Secretary of State of Kentucky from 1880 to 1883. He also served as a member of the Kentucky Senate from 1875 to 1880. He was a member of the Democratic Party.

== Biography ==
James W. Blackburn was born on April 30, 1841, in Woodford County, Kentucky, to Edward "Ned" Blackburn and Lavinia Bell.

In 1861, Blackburn joined the Confederate States Army, and until 1864, when he was taken prisoner. In February 1865, he was released and served until the end of the war.

In the 1870 United States census, he was listed as a farmer with four children, James, Samuel, Mary, and Henrietta.

In 1875, Blackburn was elected a member of the Kentucky Senate, a position he held until 1880. In 1880, he was appointed Secretary of State of Kentucky by his brother and Governor Luke P. Blackburn. He served in that position until 1883. He was also a member of the 1890 Kentucky Constitutional Convention, which introduced amendments to the Kentucky Constitution. He died on December 14, 1915, in Buffalo, New York.
