= William C. Greenup =

American politician

William C. Greenup was an American politician who served as the 5th Secretary of State of Kentucky from February to September 1808.
