= Alfred W. Grayson =

American politician

Alfred William Grayson was an American politician who served as Secretary of State of Kentucky from 1807 to 1808.
