= James P. Lewis =

American educator, politician, and banker (1869–1942)

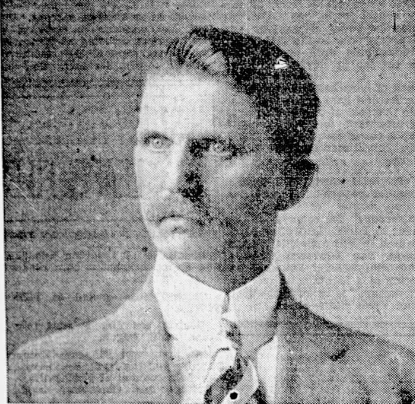
- Lewis in 1915

Kentucky State Banking Commissioner
- In office 1920–1923
- Governor: Edwin P. Morrow

60th Secretary of State of Kentucky
- In office January 3, 1916 – January 5, 1920
- Governor: Augustus O. Stanley; James D. Black; Edwin P. Morrow
- Preceded by: Carl F. Crecelius
- Succeeded by: Fred A. Vaughn

County Judge of Letcher County
- In office January 6, 1902 – January 1, 1906

Personal details
- Born: September 8, 1869 Partridge, Kentucky, U.S.
- Died: May 22, 1942 (aged 72) Hazard, Kentucky, U.S.
- Resting place: Georgetown Cemetery
- Party: Republican
- Spouse: Maria Caudill (m. 1895)
- Children: 11
- Parent(s): Wilson Lewis; Katie Collier
- Education: Curry College; Union College; Holbrook Normal College; Northern Indiana University

James P. Lewis (September 8, 1869 – May 22, 1942) was an American educator, politician, and banker who served as Secretary of State of Kentucky from 1916 to 1920. He also served as County Judge of Letcher County from 1902 to 1906, and Kentucky state banking commissioner from 1920 to 1923. He was a member of the Republican Party.

== Biography ==
James P. Lewis was born on September 8, 1869, in Partridge, Letcher County, Kentucky, as the ninth out of eleven children born to Wilson Lewis and Katie Collier. He attended four colleges in four different states, including Curry College in Lee County, Virginia, Union College in Barbourville, Kentucky, Holbrook Normal College in Nashville, Tennessee, and Northern Indiana University (now Valparaiso University) in Valparaiso, Indiana. He married Maria Caudill in 1895, they raised a large family of 11 children.

=== Career ===
==== Early career ====
In 1890, Lewis became engaged in mercantile work. From 1892 to 1897, he served as Superintendent of Letcher County Schools. He also became active in several business endeavors including banking and coal. He created the Letcher County Coal and Improvement Company around 1912/13. Along with his brother Martin Lewis, George Hogg, and James H. Frazier the company bought and developed the land in Chip, Kentucky, which would become the city of Neon.

=== Political career ===
From 1902 to 1906, Lewis held the role of County Judge of Letcher County, Kentucky. In the following years, he gave most of his attention to business affairs. In 1915, he ran for secretary of state of Kentucky against Barksdale Hamlett. Lewis defeated Hamlett taking 209,754 votes to Hamlett's 209,639 votes. Lewis won by a majority of 115 votes. He was the only republican elected to a statewide office in that election. After leaving office, he was appointed Kentucky State Banking Commissioner by Edwin P. Morrow, a role which he held from 1920 to 1923.

=== Later career ===
Lewis continued to have several business interests in Letcher County and Georgetown, Kentucky. In 1935, he was appointed chairman of the board of trustees of Georgetown College.

=== Later life and death ===
During the last few years of his life, Lewis lived in Georgetown, Kentucky. While returning to Kentucky from a trip to Florida, he suddenly became ill, and was taken to a hospital in Hazard, Kentucky. During the following three weeks, his condition would worsen until his death on May 22, 1942, at the age of 72. He was buried at Georgetown Cemetery.
