= Sara Mahan =

American politician (1870–1966)

Sara W. Mahan (February 26, 1870 – November 1, 1966) was an American Progressive Era social reformer, and early Democratic Party female politician from Kentucky in the United States. Mahan was one of the founders of the Democratic Women's Club of Kentucky. She was one of the first women to become a member of the Kentucky Democratic State Central and executive committee.

== Early life ==
The daughter of George D. and Katherine Cain (White), she was born in Clay County, Kentucky on February 26, 1870.

== Career ==
In 1907 Mahan began her political career when she managed the campaign headquarters of the Kentucky Democratic gubernatorial candidate, Judge Samuel Wilber Hager. The Frankfort Journal took note of her work and said, "Miss Mahan displayed remarkable exec. ability and was the first woman to have charge of the successful management of a campaign for the nomination for the chief office of this Commonwealth."

In 1908, Mahan became assistant state librarian and remained in the position until 1920. From 1920 to 1921, she served as Centre College librarian.

Mahan was Boyle County Circuit Court Clerk from 1921 to 1929. She was Secretary of State of Kentucky from 1932 to 1936.

== Personal life ==
Mahan was a member of many Women's Clubs and other community organizations, including the Democratic Women's Club of Kentucky, Woman's Club of Frankfort, and the Business and Professional Women's Club. She never married. Mahan died in Danville, Kentucky, on November 1, 1966, and was interred in Bellevue Cemetery.

Political offices
Preceded by Ella Lewis	Secretary of State of Kentucky; 1932–1936	Succeeded by Charles D. Arnett
