= Ella Lewis =

American educator and politician

63rd Secretary of State of Kentucky
- In office January 2, 1928 – January 4, 1932
- Governor: Flem D. Sampson; Ruby Laffoon
- Preceded by: Emma Guy Cromwell
- Succeeded by: Sara Mahan

Personal details
- Born: December 26, 1878 Leitchfield, Kentucky, U.S.
- Died: December 16, 1953 (aged 74) Louisville, Kentucky, U.S.
- Party: Democratic
- Parent(s): James Franklin Lewis; Mary Kirkland
- Education: Western Kentucky State Normal School; Transylvania University

Ella Lewis (December 26, 1878 – December 16, 1953) was an American educator and politician who served as Secretary of State of Kentucky from 1928 to 1932. She was the second woman to be elected to the office. She was a member of the Democratic Party.

== Biography ==
Ella Lewis was born on December 26, 1878, in Leitchfield, Kentucky, to James Franklin Lewis and Mary Kirkland. She received a common education, and attended Western Kentucky State Normal School and Transylvania University. She never married or had any children.

Lewis served as superintendent of Grayson County Schools for 8 years. In 1927, she ran for Secretary of State of Kentucky against F. D. Quisenberry. She defeated Quisenberry taking 1,316 votes to Quisenberry's 1,037 votes, becoming the 2nd woman elected to the office. Lewis held the role of Secretary of State for four years from 1928 to 1932, where she served for four years under Flem D. Sampson, the Republican governor. She was also employed by the Kentucky Department of Public Welfare for three years.

Lewis died of uremia on December 16, 1953, in Louisville, Kentucky, at the age of 74. She had experienced several years of feeble health before her death. She was interred in Leitchfield, Kentucky.
