= Secretary of the Commonwealth =

Secretary of the Commonwealth is a variant of Secretary of State in three U.S. state governments.

It may refer to:

- Secretary of the Commonwealth of Massachusetts
- Secretary of the Commonwealth of Pennsylvania
- Secretary of the Commonwealth of Virginia

Secretary of the Commonwealth in the United Kingdom is also a commonly disused term to refer to the Secretary of State for Foreign and Commonwealth Affairs.

The term Commonwealth Secretariat refers to the head office of the Commonwealth of Nations.
