= Samuel B. Churchill =

American politician (1812–1890)

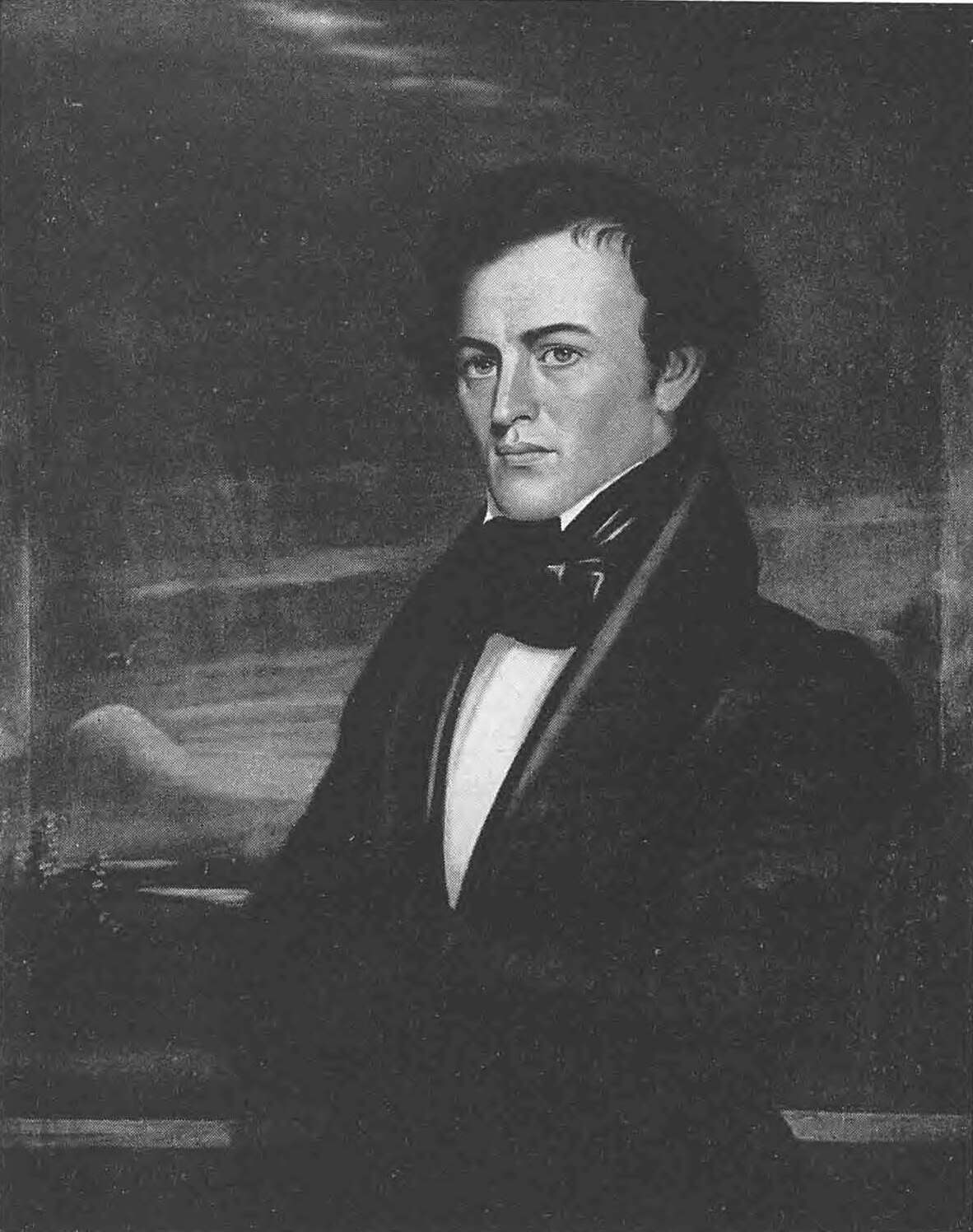
- portrait by George Caleb Bingham, 1837
- Born: 6 December 1812; Louisville
- Died: 14 May 1890 (aged 77)
- Alma mater: Transylvania University
- Occupation: Politician, journalist
- Parent(s): Samuel Churchill
- Position held: member of the State Senate of Missouri, Secretary of State of Kentucky

Samuel Bullitt Churchill (December 6, 1812 – May 14, 1890) was an American attorney and politician who served as Secretary of State of Kentucky for two non-consecutive terms from 1867 to 1871 and 1879 to 1880. He also served as a member of the Missouri Senate in 1858. He was a member of the Democratic Party.

Churchill was one of sixteen children of Samuel Churchill, a Kentucky State Senator, and Abigail Oldham Churchill.
