= James Harlan =

James Harlan is the name of:

- James Harlan (Iowa politician) (1820–1899), U.S. Senator and U.S. Secretary of the Interior
  - James Harlan (Walker), a statue of Harlan by Nellie Walker
- James Harlan (Kentucky politician) (1800–1863), state Attorney General and Secretary of State and U.S. Representative
- James Harlan Jr. (1831–1897), American politician and judge from Kentucky
- James S. Harlan (1861–1927), American lawyer and commerce specialist
- Jim Harlan (born 1954), American football player
