= List of United States Supreme Court justices who owned slaves =

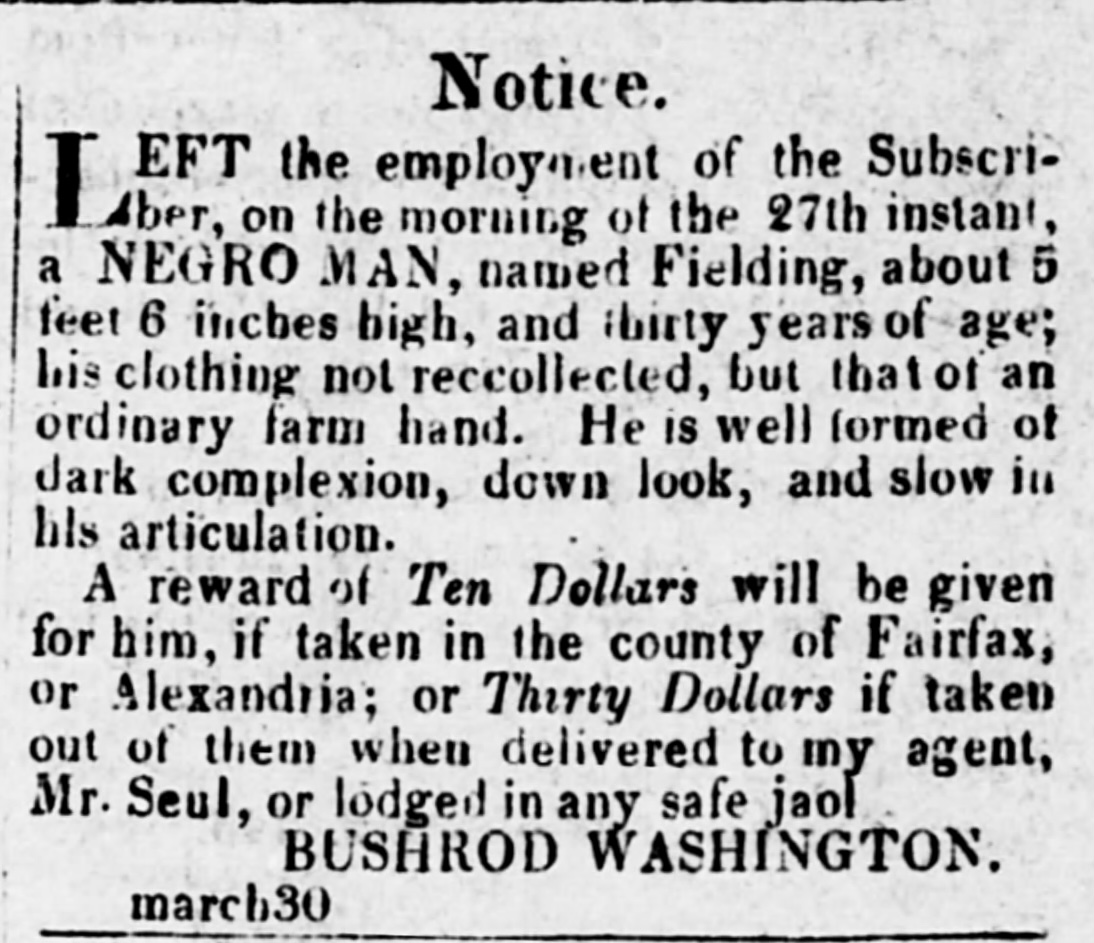
Bushrod Washington placed a runaway slave ad in the Alexandria Gazette of April 4, 1821, seeking the return of Fielding, reward $10

This is a list of U.S. Supreme Court justices who owned slaves at any point in their lives. Slavery was legal in parts of the United States from the American Revolutionary War through the adoption of the Thirteenth Amendment to the United States Constitution in December, 1865, shortly after the conclusion of the American Civil War.

No.	Justice	Chief or Associate	Approximate number of slaves held	While on federal bench?	Notes
1	John Jay	Chief	17	Yes (1789–1795)	Owned five slaves as late as 1800; advocate for gradual emancipation and first president of the New York Manumission Society.
2	John Rutledge	Associate & Chief	60+	Yes (1790–1791, 1795)	Lifelong slave owner. Argued for slavery before the Constitutional Convention. Rescued by enslaved people after a suicide attempt. Owned one slave on his death in 1800. Related by marriage to the abolitionist Grimké sisters.
4	James Wilson	Associate	1	Yes (1789–1798)	One of the proposers of the Three-fifths Compromise. Helped to write but opposed including the Fugitive Slave Clause. While purporting to be an opponent of slavery, owned one household slave, freed in 1794.
6	James Iredell	Associate	14+	Yes (1790–1799)	Was openly against the practice of slavery, especially the slave trade, while continuing to enslave people. Freed some during his lifetime.
7	Thomas Johnson	Associate	50+	Yes (1791–1793)	Had enslaved people working at his and his brothers' factory, Catoctin Furnace. Runaway slave ads and records of sale survive.
9	Samuel Chase	Associate	15	Yes (1796–1811)	Despite owning slaves, was opposed to slavery on a religious basis.
11	Bushrod Washington	Associate	83	Yes (1798–1829)	Heir to Mount Vernon and the enslaved people who worked and lived on the property. Helped found the American Colonization Society.
12	Alfred Moore	Associate	48	Yes (1800–1804)	Moore's plantation, Buchoi, was raided by British forces during the Revolutionary War, who seized livestock and freed enslaved people.
13	John Marshall	Chief	150+	Yes (1801–1835)	Lifelong slave owner; provided venture capital to slave speculators.
14	William Johnson	Associate	unknown	Yes (1804–1834)	Critical voice in the case of Denmark Vesey's slave rebellion. "Opposed abolition while also opposing inhumane treatment of Africans."
16	Thomas Todd	Associate	26	Yes (1807–1826)	
17	Gabriel Duvall	Associate	~200	Yes (1811–1835)	Enslaved people built his house, Marietta (Glenn Dale, Maryland). As an attorney prior to serving on the Court, represented enslaved people suing for their freedom.
20	Robert Trimble	Associate	23	unknown (1826–1828)	Prior to joining the Court, involved in the case of the slave ship Antelope.
21	John McLean	Associate	3+	Yes (1829–1861)	Vocal opponent of slavery prior to joining and while sitting on the Court. Dissented in slave cases of Prigg v. Pennsylvania and Dred Scott v. Sandford. Known to have purchased enslaved people and freed them subsequently.
23	James M. Wayne	Associate	100+	unknown (1835–1867)	Concurrence in Dred Scott decision. Freed enslaved woman he had three children with.
24	Roger B. Taney	Chief	8+	No (1836–1864)	Manumitted "most (but not all)" of his slaves as young man. Some manumissions delayed until the 1840s. "Deeply committed to slavery". Wrote the Dred Scott decision.
25	Philip P. Barbour	Associate	54	Yes (1836–1841)	While in Congress, advocated for admission of Missouri as a slave state during the Missouri Compromise and upheld Missouri's ban on the entry of free Black Americans (legally deemed non-citizens). "One of the largest slave owners in Orange County"
26	John Catron	Associate	10	Yes (1837–1865)	Lifelong slave owner; father of an extramarital child by an enslaved woman named Sally. Concurrence in Dred Scott decision.
27	John McKinley	Associate	12	Yes (1838–1852)	
28	Peter V. Daniel	Associate	8+	Yes (1842–1860)	Concurrence in Dred Scott decision. "The most pro-southern and proslavery of all the justices."
33	John A. Campbell	Associate	14	No (1853–1861)	Freed his slaves before joining the Court. Concurrence in Dred Scott decision. Quit the court at outbreak of Civil War and was later appointed Confederate Assistant Secretary of War; he "bitterly opposed" Reconstruction and organized multiple lawsuits in opposition.
36	Samuel Freeman Miller	Associate	unknown	No (1862–1890)	Freed his slaves before he left Kentucky for Iowa in 1850.
44	John Marshall Harlan	Associate	unknown	No (1877–1911)	Had a mixed-race half-brother, Robert James Harlan. Owned "a few household slaves", and did not free his slaves until the abolishment of slavery. "The Great Dissenter," he ultimately became one of the court's staunchest defenders of equal rights.
49	Lucius Q. C. Lamar	Associate	31	No (1888–1893)	Staunch proslavery activist and speaker.

== See also ==
- Lists of United States public officials who owned slaves
- Slavery in the District of Columbia
- History of the Supreme Court of the United States
- List of court cases in the United States involving slavery

== Literature ==
- Finkelman, Paul (2018). Supreme Injustice: Slavery in the Nation's Highest Court. The Nathan I. Huggins Lectures. Cambridge, Mass.: Harvard University Press. ISBN 9780674051218. LCCN 2017021771.
