= Attorney General Harlan =

Attorney General Harlan may refer to:

- James Harlan (Kentucky politician) (1800–1863), Attorney General of Kentucky
- John Marshall Harlan (1833–1911), Attorney General of Kentucky
