= Lists of United States public officials who owned slaves =

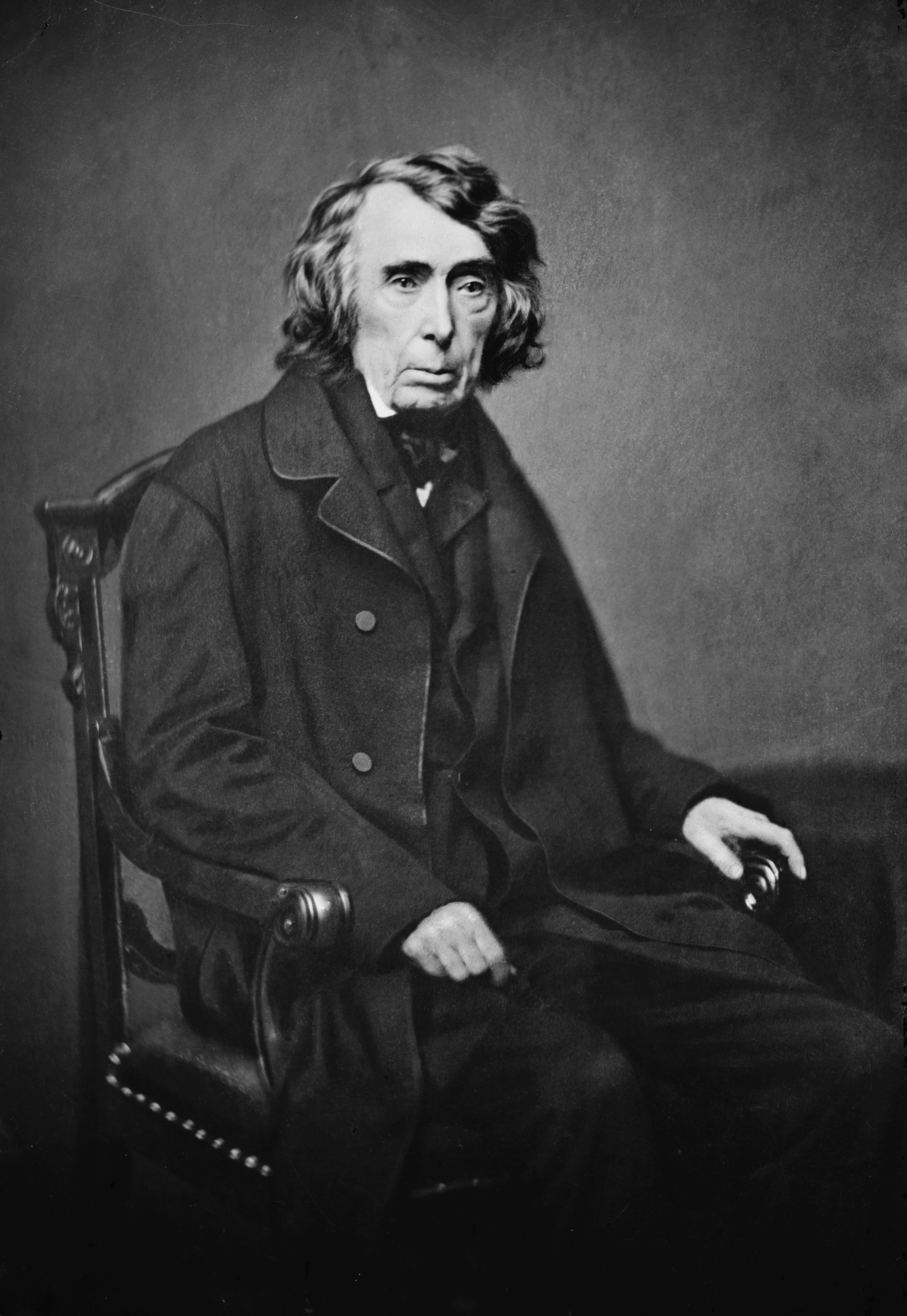
Justice Taney manumitted "most (but not all)" of his slaves as young man and was "deeply committed to slavery" throughout his life (Brady-Handy collection, Library of Congress)

This is a list of lists of United States public officials who owned slaves:

- List of presidents of the United States who owned slaves
- List of vice presidents of the United States who owned slaves
- List of members of the United States Congress who owned slaves
- List of United States Supreme Court justices who owned slaves

== See also ==
- John Quincy Adams and abolitionism
- Slavery in the District of Columbia
