= List of vice presidents of the United States who owned slaves =

This is a list of vice presidents of the United States who owned slaves. Slavery was legal in the United States from its beginning as a nation, having been practiced in North America since early colonial days. The Thirteenth Amendment to the United States Constitution formally abolished slavery in 1865, after the end of the American Civil War earlier in the year.

At least nine vice presidents owned slaves at some point in their lives. Thomas Jefferson was the first while Andrew Johnson was the last.

== Vice presidents who owned slaves ==
No.	Vice president	Approximate number of slaves held	While in office?	Notes	Ref.
2	Thomas Jefferson	600+	Yes (1797–1801)	Most historians believe Jefferson fathered multiple slave children with the enslaved woman Sally Hemings, the likely half-sister of his late wife Martha Wayles Skelton. Despite being a lifelong slave owner, Jefferson routinely condemned the institution of slavery, attempted to restrict its expansion, and advocated gradual emancipation. As president, he oversaw the abolition of the international slave trade. See Thomas Jefferson and slavery for more details.	
3	Aaron Burr	10+	Yes (1801–1805)	Burr was born into a slaveholding family. He became a slaveholder himself upon his marriage to Theodosia Bartow Prevost, who held slaves from her prior marriage to Jacques Marcus Prevost, and bought a servant named Carlos. Burr personally opposed to slavery, proposing a 1785 bill for immediate emancipation which failed in the New York State Assembly in favor of another bill which required gradual emancipation and was never passed; a later bill for immediate emancipation was passed after Burr returned to the State Assembly in 1799. His son John Pierre Burr became an abolitionist and civil rights activist.	
7	John C. Calhoun	70–80	unknown	Calhoun led the pro-slavery faction in the Senate, opposing both total abolitionism and attempts such as the Wilmot Proviso to limit the expansion of slavery into the western territories. He also owned 70–80 enslaved African-Americans at his Fort Hill Plantation, comprising the area where Clemson University currently sits.	
8	Martin Van Buren	1	No	Van Buren's father owned six slaves. The only slave Van Buren personally owned, Tom, escaped in 1814, and Van Buren made no effort to find him. Otherwise, Van Buren hired out free and enslaved African Americans to work at the Decatur House, a pattern he continued during his time in the White House. Later in life, Van Buren belonged to the Free Soil Party, which opposed the expansion of slavery into the Western territories, but not immediate abolition.	
9	Richard M. Johnson	unknown	unknown	Johnson inherited Julia Chinn, an octoroon mixed-race woman (seven-eighths European and one-eighth African in ancestry), who was born into slavery around 1790. He was later criticized for his interracial relationship with Chinn. Unlike other upper-class planters and leaders who had African-American mistresses or concubines, but never acknowledged them, Johnson treated Chinn as his common-law wife. He acknowledged their two daughters as his children, giving them his surname, much to the consternation of some of his constituents. When Lewis Tappan requested presentation of an abolitionist petition to the Senate, Johnson, still a slaveowner, declined the request.	
10	John Tyler	29	Yes (1841)	Evidence suggests that at least four enslaved and free enslaved African Americans worked in the White House when Tyler was president. He also never freed any of his slaves and consistently supported the slaveholder's rights and the expansion of slavery during his time in political office.	
13	William R. King	unknown	unknown	He developed a large cotton plantation based on slave labor, calling the property "Chestnut Hill". King and his relatives formed one of the state's largest slaveholding families, collectively owning as many as 500 people. During the conflicts leading up to the Compromise of 1850, King supported the Senate's gag rule against debate on antislavery petitions and opposed proposals to abolish slavery in the District of Columbia, which Congress administered.	
14	John C. Breckinridge	unknown	unknown	1850, he was nominated for a position in the Kentucky state legislature by a meeting trying to protect the interest of slaveowners. He joined Buchanan in supporting the proslavery Lecompton Constitution for Kansas. In 1860, he ran for president and campaigned on a platform calling for federal intervention to protect slaveowners in U.S. territories. He resigned as a U.S. Senator in 1861, becoming a brigadier general for the Confederacy and later a Secretary of War.	
16	Andrew Johnson	9	No	Johnson acquired up to at least ten slaves from 1843 until their manumission on August 8, 1863, after which they remained as paid servants. A year later, on October 24, 1864, Johnson, as military governor of Tennessee, proclaimed the freedom of Tennessee's slaves.	

== See also ==
- Lists of United States public officials who owned slaves
- Abolitionism in the United States
- District of Columbia Compensated Emancipation Act (1862), which ended slavery in Washington, D.C.
- John Quincy Adams and abolitionism
- List of slave owners
- Slavery in the District of Columbia
- Slavery in the United States
- Treatment of slaves in the United States
