= Preston Leslie =

Governor of Kentucky (1819–1907)

Preston H. Leslie
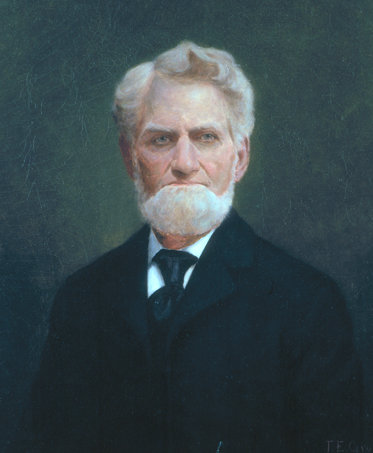

U.S. District Attorney
- In office 1894–1898
- Constituency: Montana Territory

9th Territorial Governor of Montana
- In office February 18, 1887 – April 13, 1889
- Preceded by: Samuel Thomas Hauser
- Succeeded by: Benjamin F. White

26th Governor of Kentucky
- In office February 13, 1871 – August 31, 1875
- Lieutenant: John G. Carlisle
- Preceded by: John W. Stevenson
- Succeeded by: James B. McCreary

Member of the Kentucky Senate
- In office August 5, 1867 – August 7, 1871
- Preceded by: James W. Gorin
- Succeeded by: John S. Barlow
- Constituency: 11th district
- In office August 4, 1851 – August 1, 1853
- Preceded by: John W. Ritter
- Succeeded by: John S. Barlow
- Constituency: 7th district

Member of the Kentucky House of Representatives
- In office 1844–1850

Personal details
- Born: March 8, 1819 Wayne County, Kentucky
- Died: February 7, 1907 (aged 87) Helena, Montana
- Resting place: Forestvale Cemetery
- Party: Whig, Democrat
- Spouse(s): Louisa Black; Mary Kuykendall
- Occupation: Farmer
- Profession: Lawyer

Preston Hopkins Leslie (March 8, 1819 – February 7, 1907) was the 26th governor of Kentucky from 1871 to 1875, and territorial governor of Montana from 1887 to 1889. He ascended to the office of governor by three different means. First, he succeeded Kentucky governor John W. Stevenson upon the latter's resignation to accept a seat in the United States Senate in 1871. Later that year, he was elected to a full term as governor, defeating John Marshall Harlan in the general election. Finally, he was appointed territorial governor by President Grover Cleveland.

Leslie was a Confederate sympathizer during the Civil War, but began to adopt a more progressive position during his gubernatorial campaign against Harlan. Though he opposed ratification of the Fourteenth and Fifteenth Amendments, he used his influence as governor to effect passage of laws admitting the testimony of blacks in court and providing for an educational system for recently freed slaves. He also helped quell violence perpetrated by the Ku Klux Klan in many areas of the state.

As territorial governor of Montana, Leslie quickly drew the ire of the press for his pro-temperance position. The territory's political machinery also turned against him, and he was removed from office by President Benjamin Harrison. When Grover Cleveland succeeded Harrison for a second term in office, he appointed Leslie district attorney for Montana. Leslie continued to practice law well into his eighties, and was being considered for a district court judgeship in Montana when he fell ill with pneumonia and died on February 7, 1907, at the age of 87.

== Early life ==
Preston Leslie was born in Clinton County, Kentucky (then a part of Wayne County), on March 8, 1819. He was the second son of Vachel H. and Sarah Hopkins Leslie. He was educated in the public schools, then studied law under Judge Rice Maxey. He worked with his father on the family farm until 1835, and supported himself by doing odd jobs including driving a stagecoach, running a ferry, and being store clerk. Leslie was admitted to the bar on October 10, 1840, and served as the deputy clerk of the Clinton County courts. In 1841, he relocated to Tompkinsville, Kentucky, where he worked as a farmer. He became county attorney of Monroe County in 1842.

On November 11, 1841, Leslie married Louisa Black; they had seven children. Louisa died on August 9, 1858. Leslie married the widowed Mary Maupin Kuykendall on November 17, 1859, fathering three more children. Mary Leslie died September 3, 1900.

== Political career ==
Leslie began his political career by being elected as a Whig to the Kentucky House of Representatives in 1844. He was defeated for a seat in the state Senate in 1846 by a single vote. He continued serving in the House until 1850, when he won election to the Senate representing Monroe and Barren counties. He then served in the Senate until 1855. In the 1850s, the Whig Party gradually faded in Kentucky, and Leslie became a Democrat. He declined nominations for a seats in the United States Congress and on the Kentucky Court of Appeals, preferring instead to work on his farm. In 1859, he moved to Glasgow, Kentucky, in Barren County.

By 1861, Leslie had built up a prosperous estate and added a plot of land in Texas to his holdings in Kentucky. In December of that year, he and his eldest son traveled to the property with 26 slaves and a large part of the family's possessions. After establishing his household, Leslie returned to Kentucky and left the Texas estate in the care of his son.

Leslie's feelings were mixed on the issues central to the Civil War. Known as a "strong Union man" prior to the war, his sympathies switched to the southern cause once the war began. Nevertheless, he believed the South should solve its differences with the North through diplomatic means, and did not favor the idea of secession. He kept a low political profile and refused military service for either side. He returned to the state Senate from 1867 to 1871, serving as president of that body from 1869 to 1871.

=== Governor of Kentucky ===
On February 13, 1871, Governor John W. Stevenson resigned his post to accept a seat in the U.S. Senate. Stevenson had ascended to the governorship on the death of John L. Helm, and had no lieutenant governor. As president of the Senate, Leslie was the ex-officio lieutenant governor, and next in line to succeed Stevenson. A gubernatorial election was already scheduled later in 1871, and Leslie was among several nominees put forward by the Democrats. Because of Leslie's opposition to the Fourteenth and Fifteenth Amendments, his candidacy was opposed by Henry Watterson, founder of the powerful Louisville Courier-Journal. Despite this, Leslie emerged from a field of Democratic candidates that included future governors John Y. Brown and J. Proctor Knott and former Confederate governor Richard Hawes. John G. Carlisle was chosen as Leslie's running mate, and was declared by one commentator to be "by odds, the ablest man on the ticket". Leslie's opposition to the Southern Railroad bill while serving in the state senate proved a liability with some voters in his own party. Because of his southern sympathies, he was also opposed by the more progressive "New Departure" wing of his party. Nevertheless, he enjoyed support from the Bourbon Democrats in the state, as well as the state's tobacco interests and the Louisville and Nashville Railroad.

During the campaign, Leslie's opponent Republican John Marshall Harlan was blasted as a "political weathercock" for having changed his stance on many issues. In one joint debate, Leslie quoted an antebellum speech wherein Harlan had called the Republican platform "revolutionary, and if carried out, would result in the destruction of our free government." Harlan admitted his inconsistent stands, declaring that he would rather be right than consistent. Meanwhile, Leslie began moving closer to the "New Departure" wing of his party during the course of the campaign. Ultimately, Leslie's supporters deemed him "sober, conservative, and safe", and this perception enabled him to defeat Harlan by a considerable margin in the first election in which blacks were allowed to vote.

Leslie laid out an aggressive legislative agenda in his inaugural address to the General Assembly on September 5, 1871, but legislators were more concerned with passing the Southern Railroad bill that would create a connection between the railroads of Cincinnati, Ohio, and those of the Southern United States. The line would pass through central Kentucky, opening up trade to the region. It would be funded primarily by capital from Ohio, and would provide competition to the Louisville and Nashville Railroad's monopoly in the state. Though Leslie wasn't particularly supportive of the bill, he refused to veto it because of the potential economic benefits to the state. Leslie was also faced with the issue of post-war violence by the Ku Klux Klan. The legislature had refused to pass a law against mob violence in 1871. In his address to the legislature on December 6, 1871, Leslie endorsed legislation that made it illegal to write or post threatening notices and to band together and wear disguises. This proposal enjoyed favorable public opinion, and was passed during the legislature's next session. With the railroad and violence issues resolved, Governor Leslie urged the legislature to improve the status of blacks in the state, including the creation of an educational system for blacks and the approval of the testimony of blacks in the state's courts. He commissioned a new geological survey, appointing native Kentuckian Nathaniel Southgate Shaler to head the work. An advocate of the temperance movement, he secured additional regulations on the sale of liquor. Also during Leslie's tenure, the penal system was improved.

Devout Baptists and teetotalers, Governor and Mrs. Leslie did not serve alcohol in the governor's mansion and were given a silver service set at the expiration of his term by the Good Templars of Kentucky for their charity to the needy. Following his term in office, Leslie was elected to serve on the Glasgow circuit court, a position he held for six years, beginning in 1881. He failed in a re-election bid in 1886 by four votes.

=== Governor of Montana ===
In 1887, President Grover Cleveland appointed Leslie to be the Territorial Governor of Montana. Cleveland made the appointment on the recommendation of John Marshall Harlan, Leslie's opponent in the Kentucky gubernatorial election of 1871, who was now serving as an Associate Justice of the United States Supreme Court. Leslie soon ran afoul of the local press, who labeled him the "Coldwater Governor" for his stands in favor of temperance. The press's opinion of him further dimmed when he pardoned a prostitute convicted of grand larceny because the penitentiary was not equipped to accommodate women. He urged the territorial legislature to enact fiscal reforms and improve facilities for the insane and the incarcerated, but he was no match for the political machinery in Montana Territory. His 1889 pocket veto of an appointment bill supported by the legislature was the final straw; under pressure from Republicans, President Benjamin Harrison replaced Leslie as territorial governor.

Meanwhile, in Kentucky, the state treasurer, "Honest Dick" Tate, had absconded with nearly $250,000 of the state's money in 1888. During the investigation that followed, it was discovered that Leslie, along with several other state officials, had procured personal loans from the state treasury through Tate.

== Later life and death ==
Following his removal from office, Leslie opened a legal practice in Helena, Montana, partnering with A. J. Craven. President Cleveland in his second term appointed Leslie U.S. district attorney of Montana. He served from 1894 to 1898.

During his final years practicing law in Helena, Leslie gained widespread acclaim and served as president of the Montana State Bar Association. On a return visit to Kentucky in 1906, he addressed the legislature, noting how he had helped the state adjust to the "new order" following the Civil War. Montana governor Joseph Toole was circulating a petition to have Leslie named a district court judge when Leslie fell ill with pneumonia. He died February 7, 1907, and was buried at Forestvale Cemetery in Helena.

== Memorials ==
Leslie County, Kentucky, was formed in 1878 and was named in his honor.

Party political offices
Preceded by John W. Stevenson	Democratic nominee for Governor of Kentucky; 1871	Succeeded by James B. McCreary
Political offices
Preceded by John W. Stevenson	Governor of Kentucky; 1871–1875	Succeeded by James B. McCreary
