= William Lee Miller =

American academic (1926–2012)

- Born: April 21, 1926; Bloomington, Indiana, United States
- Died: May 27, 2012 (aged 86); New York City, New York
- Education: University of Nebraska, Yale Divinity School
- Occupation: Academic
- Spouse(s): Lou Horton, Linda Moore Miller
- Writing career
- Language: English
- Subject: Political ethics

William Lee Miller (April 21, 1926 – May 27, 2012) was an American journalist, academic, and historian who taught in the University of Virginia's religious studies department for 17 years, and remained affiliated with the university after his 1999 retirement.

== Early life and education ==
Miller was the son of a Presbyterian minister, and was born in Bloomington, Indiana. Due to his father's profession, Miller grew up in various parts of the United States, including Laramie, Wyoming, Hutchinson, Kansas, and Lincoln, Nebraska. He earned undergraduate degrees from the University of Nebraska and Yale University, and a Ph.D. from Yale.

== Political, journalistic, and government work ==
Between 1953 and 1965, Miller contributed to The Reporter. He was on staff at that publication between 1955 and 1958. In 1964, he released a collection of those writings in book form, titled Piety Along the Potomac.

Miller worked as the chief speechwriter for Adlai Stevenson II during the 1956 U.S. presidential election.

Between 1963 and 1969, while an associate professor at Yale University, he was a member of the New Haven Board of Aldermen.

He later worked in the Department of Health, Education and Welfare, writing messages to be used by President Lyndon Johnson.

== Academic work ==
Miller taught at Smith College, Yale University, and Indiana University before joining the faculty of the University of Virginia in 1982. He described his position in a 1992 Booknotes interview: "I'm not an historian. I'm a political ethicist. My present title is professor of ethics and institutions, which doesn't fit any department, but it fits me."

In the same interview, Miller acknowledged the influence of Reinhold and Richard Niebuhr on his thought and work:

"Reinhold Niebuhr was the greatest -- well, let's put it in the largest way, and then if you make me do it, I'll take it back -- the greatest American political thinker of the 20th century... ...He was a big influence on me, the reason I studied the things I did, and he would be my mentor -- my chief mentor... ...I didn't study directly with him; I studied at Yale under his brother, a man called Richard Niebuhr, who was kind of the Mycroft Holmes to his Sherlock Holmes -- you know, the Sherlock Holmes story, the one who's in the background and is even smarter than his well known brother. But Reinhold was down in New York, and we collaborated in many organizations. I wrote for his magazine. I knew him in various Ford Foundation things and then in Santa Barbara for a while."

His book Arguing About Slavery won the D.B. Hardeman Prize in 1996.

At the time of his retirement from the University of Virginia, Miller was Commonwealth Professor of Political and Social Thought, and after his retirement until his death he was the White Burkett Miller Center Scholar in Residence, professor emeritus.

== Bibliography ==
| Title | Year | Publisher | Subject matter |
|---|---|---|---|
| The Protestant and Politics | 1960 | Westminster Press | |
| Piety Along the Potomac | 1964 | Houghton Mifflin | |
| The Fifteenth Ward and the Great Society: An Encounter With a Modern City | 1966 | Riverside Press | The East Rock neighborhood of New Haven, Connecticut |
| Of Thee, Nevertheless, I Sing: An Essay on American Political Values | 1975 | Harcourt Brace Jovanovich | |
| Yankee From Georgia: The Emergence of Jimmy Carter | 1978 | Times Books | Jimmy Carter |
| The First Liberty: Religion and the American Republic | 1986 | Knopf | |
| Williamsburg: Cradle of the First Liberty | 1988 | Colonial Williamsburg Foundation | History of Williamsburg, Virginia |
| Religion and the Public Good | 1989 | Mercer University Press | |
| The Business of May Next: James Madison and the Founding | 1992 | University of Virginia Press | James Madison |
| Arguing about Slavery: The Great Battle in the United States Congress | 1996 | Knopf | John Quincy Adams and abolitionism |
| Lincoln's Virtues: An Ethical Biography | 2002 | Knopf | Abraham Lincoln |
| President Lincoln: The Duty of a Statesman | 2008 | Knopf | Abraham Lincoln |
| Two Americans: Truman, Eisenhower, and a Dangerous World | 2012 | Knopf | Harry Truman, Dwight Eisenhower |
