= Malvina Shanklin Harlan =

American writer (1839–1916)

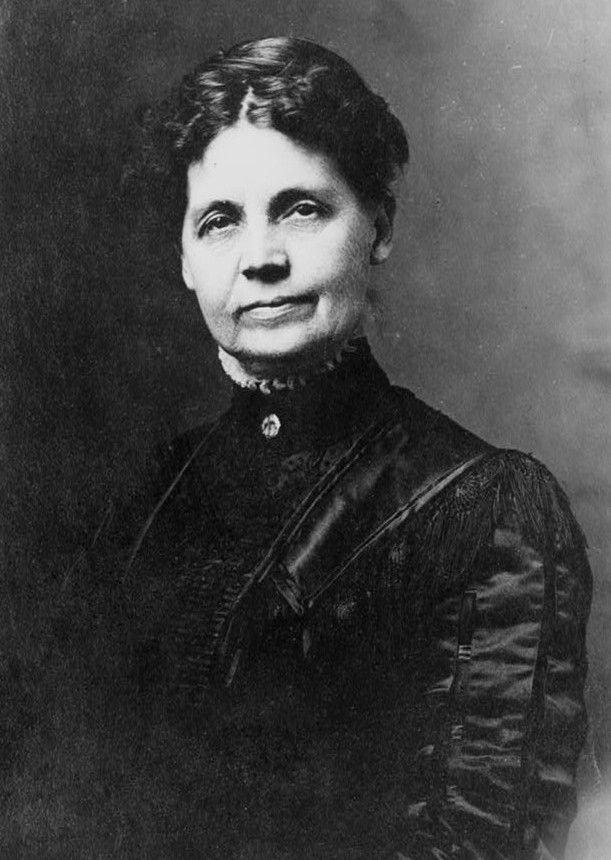
- Born: Malvina French Shanklin; 1839; Indiana
- Died: October 10, 1916 (aged 76–77); Washington, D.C., U.S.
- Resting place: Rock Creek Cemetery
- Spouse: John Marshall Harlan (m. 1856)
- Children: 6 (including James and John)
- Relatives: John Marshall Harlan II (grandson)
- Writing career
- Genre: Memoir
- Notable works: Some Memories of a Long Life, 1854–1911 (completed 1915, published 2001)

Malvina French Shanklin Harlan (1839 – October 10, 1916), informally known as "Mallie", was the wife of U.S. Supreme Court Justice John Marshall Harlan, the grandmother of Supreme Court Justice John Marshall Harlan II, and the author of a 1915 memoir entitled Some Memories of a Long Life, 1854–1911. Her memoir remained unpublished until 2001, when it was published at the instigation of Supreme Court Justice Ruth Bader Ginsburg.

== Early life and marriage ==
Malvina French "Mallie" Shanklin was born in 1839 in Indiana, raised in Evansville, and educated at girls' seminaries until she was 16. She was her family's only daughter, and she had three brothers. She first met John Marshall Harlan (then of Frankfort, Kentucky) at a dinner event held near her home that was hosted by Harlan's sister and her physician husband in 1854, when she was 16 (shortly after his admission to the bar to practice law). They married on December 23, 1856, when she was 17 and he was 23.

Her family held strongly anti-slavery views, and some members of her family were dismayed when they heard of her involvement with Harlan, as he and his family were slaveholders. She resolved to accept her husband's way of life, following the advice of her mother: "You love this man well enough to marry him. Remember, now, his home is YOUR home; his people, YOUR people; his interests, YOUR interests – you must have no other." After a honeymoon at her parents' home, she moved with her husband to Kentucky.

His family gave the couple a slave as a wedding gift. She would later remark on discovering "the close sympathy existing between the slaves and their Master or Mistress". One of the family slaves was apparently a half-brother of her husband.

Despite being a supporter of slavery at the time, John Marshall Harlan remained a supporter of the Union. When the Civil War approached a few years after their marriage, he joined the Union Army in 1861. Although Harlan rose to prominence after the war as an opponent of the Emancipation Proclamation and supporter of slavery, in his later life he would eventually become a staunch supporter of civil rights. He became known as "The Great Dissenter" due to his many dissents in Supreme Court cases that restricted civil liberties.

== Memoir ==
Shanklin Harlan's memoir, completed in 1915 (the year before her death), remained unpublished until 2001, when it was published in the Journal of Supreme Court History at the instigation of Supreme Court Justice Ruth Bader Ginsburg. Ginsburg had encountered the 200-page typed manuscript of the memoir among the John Marshall Harlan papers collected by the Library of Congress while doing research for a lecture on the wives of Supreme Court justices for the Supreme Court Historical Society. Ginsburg and the Historical Society first approached various commercial, academic, and university press publishers without finding any that were interested in publishing the manuscript, before finally deciding to publish it in its entirety in a special issue of the Historical Society's journal, a publication with only 6,000 subscribers. The publication in the journal included 207 footnote annotations and an introduction by Linda Przybyszewski, a professor of history at the University of Cincinnati who had written a biography of John Marshall Harlan in 1999.

Upon its publication by the journal, the memoir was reviewed in an article in The New York Times by Linda Greenhouse, a reporter who covered Supreme Court issues for the newspaper. Greenhouse said the memoir was "the deeply personal story of a girl's transformation from a 17-year-old bride to a confident woman, a mother of six, who offered food and drink to the 200 to 300 visitors who thronged the Harlan residence every Monday afternoon, when the wives of Supreme Court justices were expected to be 'at home' to Washington society". The coverage by the Times increased interest in the memoir among the public and led to offers from several publishers to publish the manuscript as a book. It was then published by Random House with a foreword by Ruth Bader Ginsburg, annotations and an afterword by Linda Przybyszewski, and an epilogue on the Harlan legacy by Amelia Newcomb, a great-great-granddaughter of the Harlans and editor for The Christian Science Monitor.

The range of dates that Shanklin Harlan used in the title of her memoir (1854–1911) was the period of her time with John Marshall Harlan – from when she met him when she was 16 until his death in 1911.

== Family and descendants ==
She and her husband were both Presbyterians. They had six children – three sons and three daughters. Their oldest daughter, Edith, died shortly after she married and bore a child. Their eldest son, Richard, became a Presbyterian minister and educator, and he served as president of Lake Forest College from 1901 until 1906. Their second son, James S., practiced law in Chicago and served as Attorney General of Puerto Rico before being appointed to the Interstate Commerce Commission in 1906 and becoming that body's chairman in 1914. Their youngest son, John Maynard, also practiced law in Chicago and served as an alderman before running unsuccessfully for mayor several times.

John Maynard's son, John Marshall Harlan II, served as an Associate Justice of the U.S. Supreme Court from 1955 to 1971.

== Death ==
Harlan died on October 10, 1916, at the home of her daughter in Washington, D.C. She was buried in Rock Creek Cemetery.
