= 1871 Kentucky gubernatorial election =

- August 7, 1871
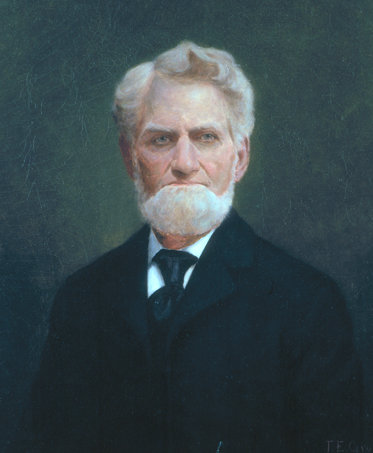

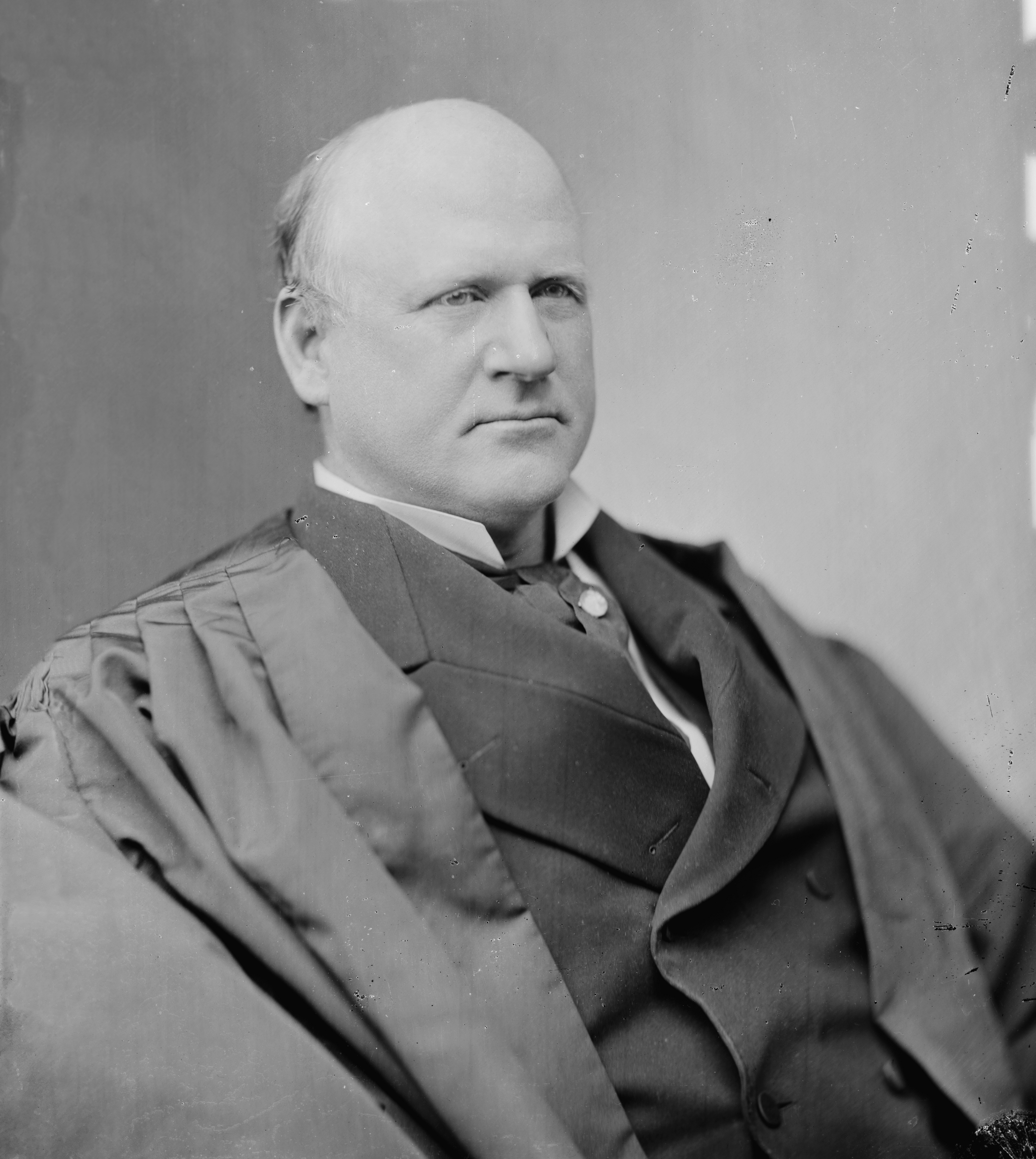
Nominee	Preston Leslie	John Marshall Harlan
Party	Democratic	Republican
Popular vote	126,445	89,298
Percentage	58.61%	41.39%
- County results Leslie: 50–60% 60–70% 70–80% 80–90% >90% Harlan: 50–60% 60–70% 70–80% 80–90%
Governor before election
Preston Leslie
Democratic
Elected Governor
Preston Leslie
Democratic

The 1871 Kentucky gubernatorial election was held on August 7, 1871. Incumbent Democrat Preston Leslie defeated Republican nominee John Marshall Harlan with 58.61% of the vote.

== General election ==
=== Candidates ===
- Preston Leslie, Democratic
- John Marshall Harlan, Republican

=== Campaigning ===
The two candidates campaigned in a somewhat unusual fashion. They traveled together, often speaking to the same audiences on the same stages where they debated. They were personally cordial and often shared lodging during the campaign.

The gubernatorial election was the first in Kentucky since Black suffrage.

=== Results ===
1871 Kentucky gubernatorial election
Party	Candidate	Votes	%	±%
Democratic	Preston Leslie (incumbent)	126,445	58.61%	−23.03%
Republican	John Marshall Harlan	89,298	41.39%	+23.03%
Majority		37,147		
Turnout				
Democratic hold		Swing		
