= S. I. M. Major =

American politician and newspaper editor (1830–1886)

Member of the Kentucky House of Representatives from the Franklin County district
- In office 1889–1890
- In office 1867–1869
- Preceded by: James Harlan Jr.
- Succeeded by: D. M. Bowen

Personal details
- Born: Samuel Ire Monger Major Jr. September 14, 1830 near Frankfort, Kentucky, U.S.
- Died: June 21, 1886 (aged 55) Frankfort, Kentucky, U.S.
- Party: Democratic
- Spouse: Mary Brown Scott (m. 1862; died 1885)
- Occupation: Politician; newspaper editor

Samuel Ire Monger Major Jr. (September 14, 1830 – June 21, 1886) was an American politician and newspaper editor from Kentucky. He served in the Kentucky House of Representatives and as mayor of Frankfort, Kentucky.

== Early life ==
Samuel Ire Monger Major Jr. was born on September 14, 1830, near Frankfort, Kentucky, to Martha (née Bohannan) and S. I. M. Major Sr. He attended the Frankfort Academy and was taught by B. B. Sayre. He attended a collegiate course and knew French.

== Career ==
Following school, Major spent a few years teaching and surveying. In 1852, Major became affiliated with William Tanner and the Frankfort Yeoman, a newspaper based on St. Clair Street in Frankfort. He became editor of the paper in 1853. He reported on the campaign of Whig candidate Alexander Keith Marshall and James O. Harrison in 1855. Following Marshall's win in the election, he wrote in the Yeoman that "Abolitionism and Know Nothingism have taken [the Whig party]". This article caused a conflict with rival Know Nothing journalist Thomas Marshall Green, who was associated with another newspaper on St. Clair Street, the Commonwealth. Green challenged Major to a duel following the article. The offer of a duel was accepted by Major and planned to occur in Virginia near the Big Sandy River, but was ultimately called off. Having accepted the duel challenge, Major and his paper became disenfranchised by Kentucky.

Following the election of Abraham Lincoln in 1860, Major published in the Yeoman frustration with the new president, stating that "the election of Lincoln, although not a sufficient cause for revolution, is nevertheless wrong both in spirit and principle". Kentucky governor Beriah Magoffin wrote a letter to Major that was later published echoing thoughts of neutrality between the North and the South. He was later pardoned from his duel challenge by Magoffin in 1862. In 1863, he resumed the publication and editing of the Yeoman. Major remained active in the management of the paper until it suspended in March 1886. He died prior to the sale of the publication.

Major was a Democrat. He was public printer from 1857 to 1860. In 1867, he was elected to the Kentucky House of Representatives, representing Franklin County. He served from 1867 to 1869. In the same year, he was elected as mayor of Frankfort and served four terms from 1867 to 1871. In his tenure, the public school system was established and the fire department and some public works projects were modernized. He also served as mayor from 1879 to 1881. In the legislature, he was chairman of the committee on public offices. He also served in the federal relations and management of the penitentiary committees. He introduced a bill for new Capitol buildings and he wrote a bill to establish a state house of correction for juveniles. He was state printer from 1866 to 1884. He was elected again in 1885 to the Kentucky legislature, representing Franklin County, and also served from 1889 to 1890. He became a member of the Democratic State Central Committee in 1851 and served in that body for about 20 years.

== Personal life ==
In October 1862, Major married Mary Brown Scott, daughter of Robert Wilmot Scott. They had several children, including one son S. I. M. Major III. His wife died in 1885. He was a member of the Episcopal Church. He accumulated a book collection that cost Major about US$25,000. He owned a home on Ann Street in Frankfort that later became a bed and breakfast.

Major died on June 21, 1886, at his home on Ann Street in Frankfort.

== Legacy ==
In 1869, Major Hall was built on Main Street in Frankfort, where City Hall would later stand. It was used as a restaurant and clubroom. It burned down on November 11, 1882.
