= William H. Copeland =

Ohio politician

William H. Copeland (July 30, 1848 – 1931) was a brakeman, porter, gauger, deputy sheriff, cafe owner, undertaker, and state legislator in Ohio. He was born in Columbus, Ohio. He served in the Ohio House of Representatives from 1888 to 1889. His photograph is part of the Ohio House of Representatives Photograph Collection.

His father William Copeland was a painting contractor and Mary Copeland was his mother. He was born in Columbus, Ohio and attended public schools before joining the Quartermaster Department at Camp Chase during the Civil War.
