= James Harlan Jr. =

American politician and judge (1831–1897)

Member of the Kentucky House of Representatives from the Franklin County district
- In office 1865–1867
- Preceded by: H. M. Bedford
- Succeeded by: S. I. M. Major

Personal details
- Born: 1831 Boyle County, Kentucky, U.S.
- Died: June 14, 1897 (aged 65–66) near Louisville, Kentucky, U.S.
- Resting place: Frankfort Cemetery
- Spouse: Anna Lane (died)
- Children: 1
- Parent: James Harlan (father)
- Relatives: John Marshall Harlan (brother)
- Education: Centre College
- Occupation: Politician; judge; lawyer

James Harlan Jr. (1831 – June 14, 1897) was an American politician and judge from Kentucky. He served in the Kentucky House of Representatives and as vice chancellor of the Jefferson Circuit Court.

== Early life ==
James Harlan Jr. was born in 1831 in Boyle County, Kentucky, to James Harlan. His brother was John Marshall Harlan. At an early age, he began practicing law with his father and was admitted to the bar between 1830 and 1840. He graduated from Centre College in 1850, the same class as his brother John.

== Career ==
Harlan moved to Frankfort, Kentucky. He started a practice there. He was appointed as clerk of Franklin County on May 30, 1862. He served in that position until May 1865. He served as a member of the Kentucky House of Representatives, representing Franklin County from 1865 to 1867. He was a member of the committee on privileges and elections and served as chairman of the committee on revised statutes.

Harlan later moved his practice to Louisville. He was appointed as vice chancellor of the Jefferson Circuit Court (later named the law and equity division). He later was elected to the office, but resigned two years before his term ended. He then practiced law with A. E. Willson. One of his rulings for a short-line railroad was that laborers employed by a railroad that goes into a receiver's hands have a lien on the railroad property that is superior to the first mortgage. Harlan's ruling on the case was upheld by the appeals court.

== Personal life ==
Harlan married Anna Lane of Evansville, Indiana. He had a son, Harry. His wife died around 1885. Until around 1894, he lived at Enterprise Hotel. Towards the end of his life, he had issues with alcohol and lived in an almshouse.

Harlan was struck by and killed by a Louisville, Henderson, and St. Louis passenger train on June 14, 1897, after stepping on to the track from the Almshouse Depot, a station six miles from Louisville. The coroner ruled the death was due to accident. He was buried in Frankfort Cemetery.
