= James Harlan (Kentucky politician) =

American politician and lawyer

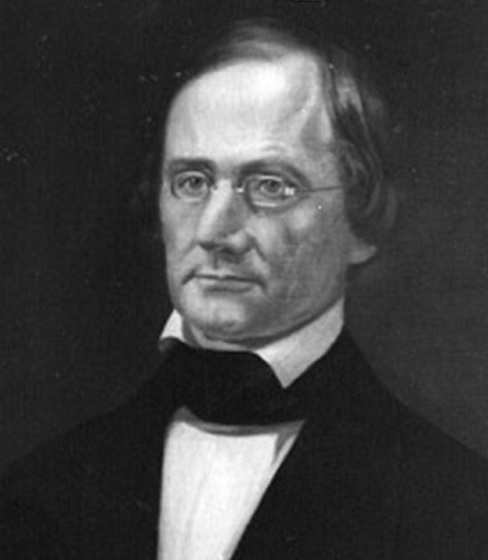
- Black and white reproduction of 1850 portrait

Member of the U.S. House of Representatives from Kentucky's 5th district
- In office March 4, 1835 – March 3, 1839
- Preceded by: Robert P. Letcher
- Succeeded by: Simeon H. Anderson

26th Secretary of State of Kentucky
- In office September 3, 1840 – September 3, 1844
- Preceded by: James M. Bullock
- Succeeded by: Benjamin Hardin

12th Attorney General of Kentucky
- In office 1851–1859
- Governor: Lazarus W. Powell; Charles S. Morehead
- Preceded by: M. C. Johnson
- Succeeded by: Andrew J. James

Personal details
- Born: June 22, 1800 Mercer County, Kentucky, U.S.
- Died: February 18, 1863 (aged 62) Frankfort, Kentucky, U.S.
- Children: 9, including John and James Jr.

James Harlan (June 22, 1800 – February 18, 1863) was an American attorney and politician who was a U.S. representative from Kentucky from 1835 to 1839. He also served as U.S. Attorney for Kentucky and, prior to that, as Kentucky Secretary of State and Attorney General, the first to be elected to the latter office statewide.

== Early life and career ==
Born in Mercer County, Kentucky, Harlan attended school before working as a clerk in a dry goods store from 1817 to 1821. Deciding to embark upon a legal career, he read law under the guidance of a local judge before gaining admission to the bar in 1823. Harlan commenced practice in Harrodsburg, Kentucky and enjoyed a busy but not especially-remunerative legal career. He served as a Commonwealth's Attorney from 1829 to 1835.

== Political career ==
A follower of Henry Clay, Harlan was soon involved in local and state politics. In 1833, he managed the reelection campaign of Congressman Robert P. Letcher. When Letcher decided not to run for another term, Harlan ran successfully to replace him. Harlan was elected as an Anti-Jacksonian to the Twenty-fourth Congress and reelected as a Whig to the Twenty-fifth Congress (serving March 4, 1835 – March 3, 1839).

In 1840, Letcher, who had won election as governor of Kentucky, appointed Harlan as Secretary of State of Kentucky, an office he held for the duration of Letcher's term. In 1845, Harlan was elected to the Kentucky House of Representatives, serving three terms until 1851. He was elected Attorney General of Kentucky in 1850, the first man elected statewide as attorney general. He served until 1859 as the state's attorney general (during which time he wrote The Code of Practice in Civil and Criminal Cases). Two years later, Harlan was appointed U.S. Attorney for Kentucky by President Abraham Lincoln, and he served in that capacity until his death in Frankfort on February 18, 1863.

== Marriage and family ==
James Harlan married Eliza Shannon Davenport (1805–70) on December 23, 1822. The couple had six sons and three daughters. One of their sons, John Marshall Harlan (1833–1911), followed his father into the law, becoming an attorney and a judge. Ultimately he was appointed as a justice of the Supreme Court of the United States, where he dissented in the important Plessy v. Ferguson (1896) civil rights case, standing up for equal rights under the law. Another son was James Harlan Jr. He was also a great-grandfather of another Supreme Court justice, John Marshall Harlan II (1899–1971).

In addition, Harlan may have had a relationship with a mulatto slave and a son by her, Robert James Harlan, born in 1816. He raised the mixed-race boy in his household, where Robert was tutored by two older half-brothers. After having a successful businesses in Harrodsburg and Lexington, Robert went to California during the Gold Rush and earned a fortune of $90,000. He returned to the Midwest, settling in Cincinnati, Ohio in 1851 and investing in real estate. He was elected as a state legislator in 1886.

U.S. House of Representatives
Preceded by Robert P. Letcher	Member of the U.S. House of Representatives from Kentucky's 5th congressional district March 4, 1835 – March 3, 1839	Succeeded by Simeon H. Anderson
Political offices
Preceded by James M. Bullock	Kentucky Secretary of State; September 3, 1840 – September 3, 1844	Succeeded by Benjamin Hardin
Legal offices
Preceded by M. C. Johnson	Attorney General of Kentucky; 1851–1859	Succeeded by Andrew J. James
