= John Marshall Harlan =

U.S. Supreme Court justice from 1877 to 1911

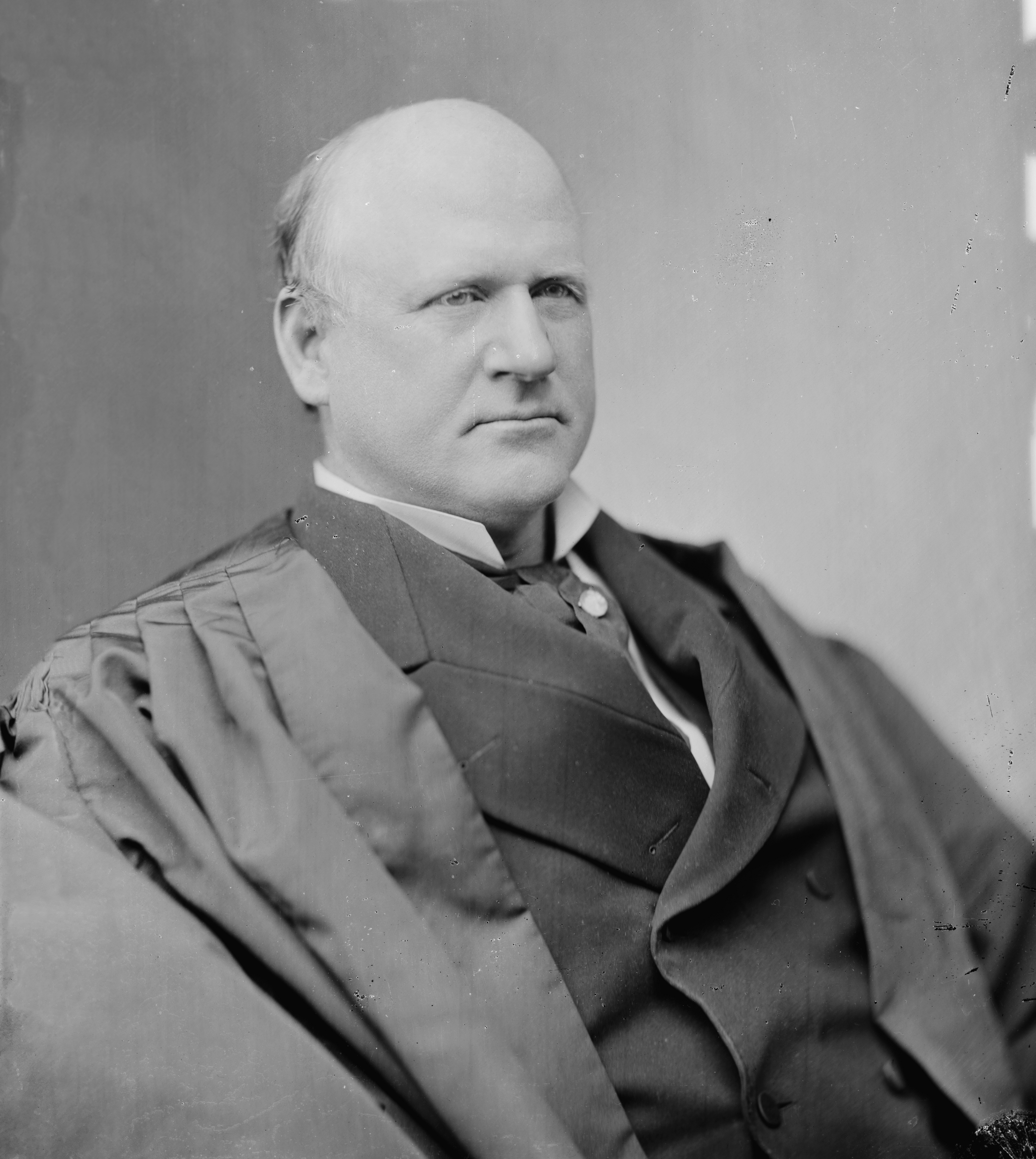
- Harlan, 1865–1880

Associate Justice of the Supreme Court of the United States
- In office December 10, 1877 – October 14, 1911
- Nominated by: Rutherford B. Hayes
- Preceded by: David Davis
- Succeeded by: Mahlon Pitney

Attorney General of Kentucky
- In office September 1, 1863 – September 3, 1867
- Governor: Thomas Bramlette
- Preceded by: Andrew James
- Succeeded by: John Rodman

Adjutant General of Kentucky
- In office April 16, 1851 – September 12, 1859
- Governor: John L. Helm; Lazarus W. Powell; Charles S. Morehead
- Preceded by: Peter Dudley
- Succeeded by: Scott Brown

Personal details
- Born: June 1, 1833 Boyle County, Kentucky, U.S.
- Died: October 14, 1911 (aged 78) Washington, D.C., U.S.
- Resting place: Rock Creek Cemetery; Washington, D.C., U.S.
- Party: Whig (before 1854); Know Nothing (1854–1858); Opposition (1858–1860); Constitutional Union (1860); Unionist (1861–1867); Republican (1868–1911)
- Spouse: Malvina Shanklin (m. 1856)
- Relations: John Marshall Harlan II (grandson); Robert James Harlan (brother); James Harlan Jr. (brother)
- Children: 6, including James, Richard, and John Maynard
- Parents: James Harlan (father); Elizabeth Davenport (mother)
- Education: Centre College (BA); Transylvania University
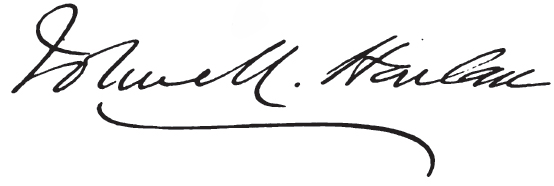
- Signature

Military service
- Allegiance: The Union
- Branch/service: Union Army
- Years of service: 1861–1863
- Rank: Colonel
- Unit: 10th Kentucky Infantry Regiment
- Commands: Crittenden Union Zouaves (Captain, August 13, 1861–October 20, 1861); 10th Kentucky Infantry Regiment (Colonel, October 20, 1861–March 17, 1863)
- Battles/wars: American Civil War: Defense of Lebanon Junction (September 1861); Battle of Mill Springs (January 19, 1862); Siege of Corinth (April 1862); Morgan's Christmas Raid (December 29, 1862)

John Marshall Harlan (June 1, 1833 – October 14, 1911) was an American lawyer and politician who served as an associate justice of the Supreme Court of the United States from 1877 until his death in 1911. He is often called "The Great Dissenter" due to his many dissents in cases that restricted civil liberties, including the Civil Rights Cases, Plessy v. Ferguson, and Giles v. Harris. Many of Harlan's views expressed in his notable dissents would become the official view of the Supreme Court starting from the 1950s Warren Court and onward.

Born into a prominent, slave-holding family near Danville, Kentucky, Harlan experienced a quick rise to political prominence. When the American Civil War broke out, Harlan strongly supported the Union and recruited the 10th Kentucky Infantry. Despite his opposition to the Emancipation Proclamation, he served in the war until 1863, when he was elected attorney general of Kentucky. Harlan lost his re-election bid in 1867 and joined the Republican Party in the following year, quickly emerging as the leader of the Kentucky Republican Party. In 1877, President Rutherford B. Hayes appointed Harlan to the Supreme Court.

Harlan's jurisprudence was marked by his life-long belief in a strong national government, his sympathy for the economically disadvantaged, and his view that the Reconstruction Amendments had fundamentally transformed the relationship between the federal government and the state governments. He was the sole dissenter in both the Civil Rights Cases (1883) and Plessy v. Ferguson (1896), which permitted state and private actors to engage in racial segregation. He also wrote dissents in major cases such as Pollock v. Farmers' Loan & Trust Co. (1895) that struck down a federal income tax, United States v. E. C. Knight Co. (1895) that severely limited the power of the federal government to pursue antitrust actions, Lochner v. New York (1905) that invalidated a state law setting maximum working hours on the basis of substantive due process; and Standard Oil Co. of New Jersey v. United States (1911) that established the rule of reason. He was the first Supreme Court justice to advocate the incorporation of the Bill of Rights, and his majority opinion in Chicago, Burlington & Quincy Railroad Co. v. City of Chicago (1897) incorporated the Takings Clause.

Harlan was largely forgotten in the decades after his death, but many scholars now consider him to be one of the greatest Supreme Court justices of his era. His grandson John Marshall Harlan II later served on the Supreme Court from 1955 to 1971.

== Early life and education ==
Harlan was born in 1833 at Harlan's Station, 5 miles (8.0 km) west of Danville, Kentucky, on Salt River Road. He was born into a prominent slaveholding family whose earliest members had settled in the region in 1779. Harlan's father was James Harlan, a lawyer and prominent Whig politician who represented Kentucky in the United States House of Representatives and served as Secretary of State of Kentucky. Harlan's mother, Elizabeth, née Davenport, was the daughter of a pioneer from Virginia. Harlan grew up on the family estate near Frankfort, Kentucky. He was named after Chief Justice of the United States John Marshall, whom his father admired. The first ancestor of the Harlan family was George Harlan, an Englishman who arrived to the American Colony of Pennsylvania in the 1600s.

John had several older brothers, including a mixed-race half-brother, Robert James Harlan, born in 1816 into slavery, and whom his father raised in his own household and had tutored by Richard and James Jr., two of John Marshall Harlan's older brothers. His brother James was a judge. According to historian Allyson Hobbs, Robert became highly successful, making a fortune in the California Gold Rush before returning east and settling in Cincinnati, Ohio. He "remained close to the other Harlans"; she suggests this might have influenced his half-brother John Marshall Harlan, "who argued on behalf of equal rights under the law in Plessy v. Ferguson".

After attending school in Frankfort, John Harlan enrolled at Centre College. He was a member of Beta Theta Pi and graduated with honors. Though his mother wanted Harlan to become a merchant, James insisted that his son follow him into the legal profession, and Harlan joined his father's law practice in 1852. While James Harlan could have trained his son in the office, as was the norm of "reading the law" in that era, he sent John to attend law school at Transylvania University in 1850, where George Robertson and Thomas Alexander Marshall were among his instructors. Harlan finished his legal education in his father's law office and was admitted to the Kentucky Bar in 1853.

== Politician and lawyer ==
=== Rise: 1851–1861 ===
A member of the Whig Party like his father, Harlan got an early start in politics when, in 1851, he was offered the post of adjutant general of the state by governor John L. Helm. He served in the post for the next eight years, which gave him a statewide presence and familiarity with many of Kentucky's leading political figures. With the Whig Party's dissolution in the early 1850s, Harlan shifted his affiliation to the Know Nothings, despite his discomfort with their opposition to Catholicism. Harlan's personal popularity within the state was such that he was able to survive the decline of the Know Nothing movement in the late 1850s, winning election in 1858 as the county judge for Franklin County, Kentucky. The following year, he renounced his allegiance to the Know Nothings and joined the state's Opposition Party, serving as their candidate in an unsuccessful attempt to defeat Democrat William E. Simms for the seat in Kentucky's 8th congressional district.

Throughout the 1850s, Harlan criticized both abolitionists and pro-slavery radicals. Like many other anti-secession Southerners, he supported the Constitutional Union ticket of John Bell and Edward Everett in the 1860 presidential election. Harlan agreed to serve as a presidential elector for Bell, and he delivered speeches on behalf of the party throughout Kentucky during the campaign. In the secession crisis that followed Republican candidate Abraham Lincoln's victory in the 1860 election, Harlan sought to prevent Kentucky from seceding.

=== Military service: 1861–1863 ===
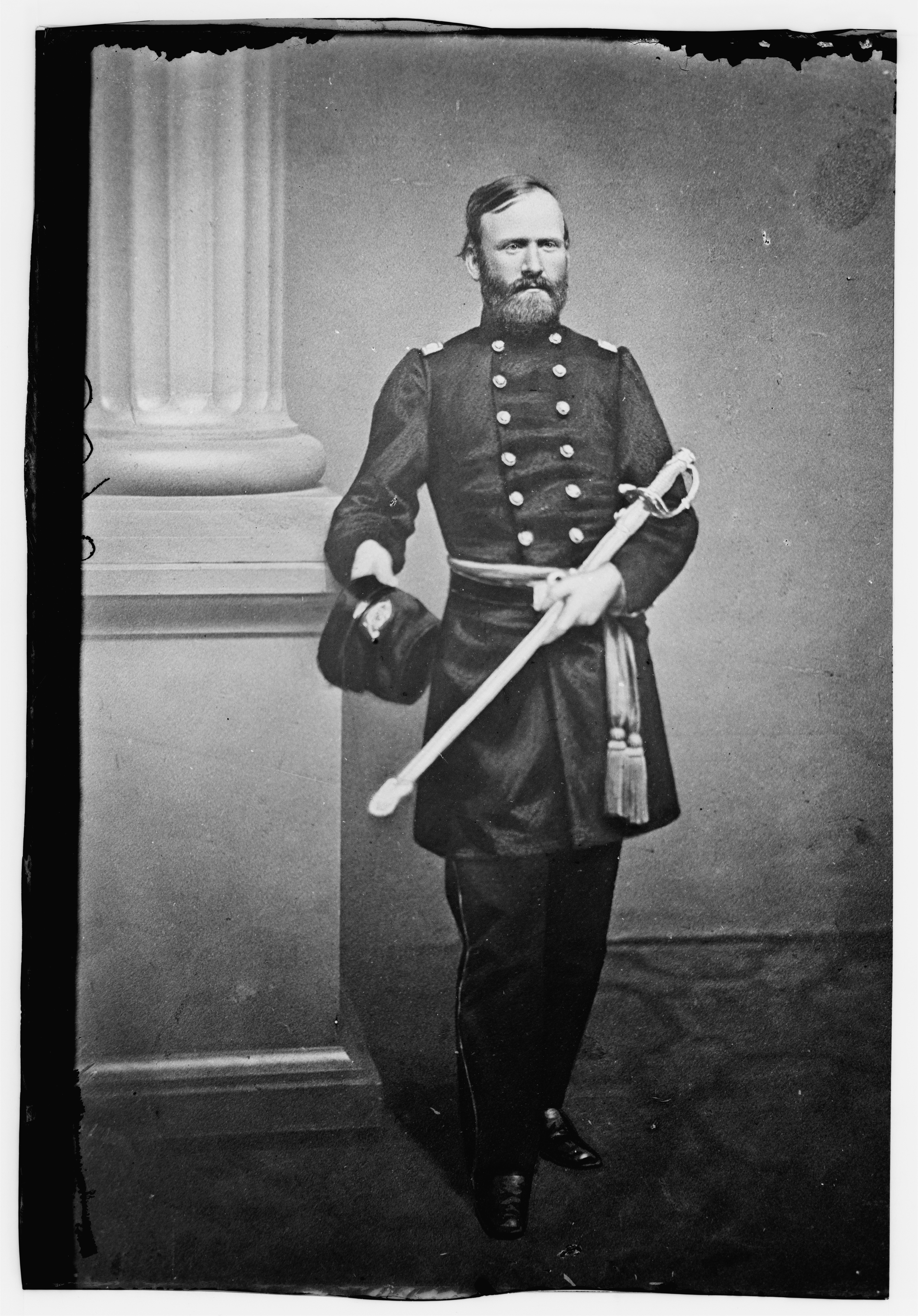
Colonel Harlan of the Union Army

When the Civil War erupted in April 1861, John Marshall Harlan was a staunch Unionist who worked tirelessly to keep Kentucky in the Union, writing several pro-Union editorials and representing the Union in state court. On August 13, 1861, After the state legislature voted to expel all Confederate forces from Kentucky, Harlan recruited and was elected captain of the newly organized Crittenden Union Zouaves, a militia unit formed to support the Union cause. By October 4, 1861, Harlan and his command were officially enrolled into the Union Army. Soon after, on October 20, 1861, he was mustered in as Colonel of the 10th Kentucky Volunteer Infantry Regiment in Lebanon, Kentucky, for a three-year term.

In September 1861, Harlan played a key role in the defense of Lebanon Junction, Kentucky, a vital transportation hub. Under General William T. Sherman, Harlan's unit worked to secure ammunition and defend strategic railroad bridges. In one notable incident, Harlan personally led efforts to transport supplies across the Rolling Fork River after Confederate forces burned the bridge, earning commendation for his resourcefulness and determination.

The 10th Kentucky Infantry soon became part of General George H. Thomas’s division. On January 19, 1862, Harlan fought at the Battle of Mill Springs, a significant Union victory that disrupted Confederate operations in Kentucky. In April 1862, his regiment participated in the Siege of Corinth, Mississippi, following the Union victory at the Battle of Shiloh.

Harlan’s most notable engagement came on December 29, 1862, during a skirmish with Confederate cavalry commander John Hunt Morgan at the Rolling Fork River Bridge, known as Morgan's Christmas Raid. After marching his forces from Munfordville to Elizabethtown, Harlan led his troops to defend the bridge, engaging Morgan’s forces with cannon and rifle fire. This skirmish successfully disrupted Morgan’s attempt to destroy critical railroad bridges, preserving vital Union supply lines. In his official report, Harlan claimed that his command "saved the Rolling Fork Bridge and most probably prevented any attempt to destroy the bridge at Shepherdsville," safeguarding property essential to Union operations in the Western Theater.

Throughout his military service, Harlan publicly argued that the Union's goal in taking up arms was to preserve the Union rather than abolish slavery. In a wartime speech, he asserted that the war "was not for the purpose of giving freedom to the Negro". Harlan vowed to resign if President Lincoln signed the Emancipation Proclamation, which he denounced as "unconstitutional and null and void" when it took effect on January 1, 1863. However, contrary to public perception, Harlan did not resign over the proclamation.

Harlan's resignation came after the sudden death of his father on March 6, 1863, prompting him to leave the army to care for his family and resume his legal and political career. He formally resigned his commission on March 17, 1863. In his resignation letter, Harlan expressed his regret at leaving the army and reaffirmed his dedication to the Union cause, writing:

"It was my fixed purpose to remain in the Federal army until it had effectually suppressed the existing armed rebellion and restored the authority of the national government over every part of the nation. ... That cause will always have the warmest sympathies of my heart, for there are no conditions upon which I will consent to a dissolution of the Union."

Harlan's time in the army was not without moments of controversy and complexity. In the fall of 1861, during an encounter near Elizabethtown, Harlan and his unit came across Confederate General Basil Duke, who was traveling incognito in civilian clothes to visit his wife in Lexington. Despite being recognized by Harlan, Duke was allowed to escape when Harlan discreetly pressed his foot on the brake of the handcar carrying Union soldiers, preventing them from stopping to apprehend Duke. Harlan later explained that he believed Duke was merely on his way to visit his wife and was not acting as a spy.

=== Party leader: 1863–1877 ===
Weeks after leaving the Army, Harlan was nominated by the Union Party to run for Attorney General of Kentucky. Campaigning on a platform of vigorous prosecution of the war, he won the election by a considerable margin. As attorney general for the state, Harlan issued legal opinions and advocated for the state in a number of court cases. Party politics, however, occupied much of his time. Though still a committed unionist, he opposed Lincoln's Emancipation Proclamation and supported Democratic candidate George B. McClellan's unsuccessful campaign in the 1864 presidential election. Harlan also opposed ratification of the Thirteenth Amendment, attacking it as a "direct interference, by a portion of the states, with the local concerns of other states".

Harlan's attitudes toward slavery remained complex throughout the war. He owned a few household slaves and did not emancipate them until forced to by the Thirteenth Amendment in December 1865, which he described as "a flagrant invasion of the right of self-government". After the end of the Civil War in 1865, Harlan initially refused to join either the Democratic Party, which he viewed as too accepting of former rebels, or the Republican Party, whose Reconstruction policies he opposed. He sought re-election in 1867 on a third-party ticket, (Note: During the 1860s, Harlan was a member of several ephemeral unionist parties separate from both the Democratic Party and the Republican Party. In 1867, he ran as a Conservative Union Democrat, competing against candidates nominated by the Democratic Party and the Republican Party.) but lost his office in a Democratic sweep of the state.

Despite his earlier opposition to emancipation and the Reconstruction Amendments, Harlan underwent a significant political transformation after his defeat. He joined the Republican Party in 1868, supporting the party's Reconstruction policies and its platform of civil rights for Black Americans. He supported Ulysses S. Grant's candidacy in the 1868 presidential election. Moving to Louisville, Harlan formed a successful partnership with John E. Newman, a former circuit-court judge who, like Harlan, was a Unionist turned Republican. In 1870, Harlan and Newman briefly took on a new partner, Benjamin Bristow, but President Grant appointed Bristow as U.S. solicitor general later that year.

While growing his legal practice, Harlan also worked to build up the Republican Party organization in the state. He served as the Republican nominee for governor of Kentucky in 1871; though he finished a distant second to incumbent Democratic Governor Preston Leslie, Harlan nonetheless established himself as the leader of the Kentucky Republican Party during the campaign. Harlan's views on Reconstruction shifted in the early 1870s, and he came to support Reconstruction measures such as the Enforcement Act of 1870, though he still opposed the Civil Rights Act of 1875 as a federal overreach. Harlan reluctantly accepted the party's gubernatorial nomination in 1875, and he once again lost by a substantial margin, this time to Democrat James B. McCreary. The following year, Harlan worked to nominate Bristow at the 1876 Republican National Convention, seeking to position Bristow as a more electable alternative to Republican front-runner James G. Blaine. When Rutherford B. Hayes instead emerged as the compromise candidate, Harlan switched his delegation's votes and subsequently campaigned on Hayes' behalf in the 1876 election.

== Supreme Court justice ==
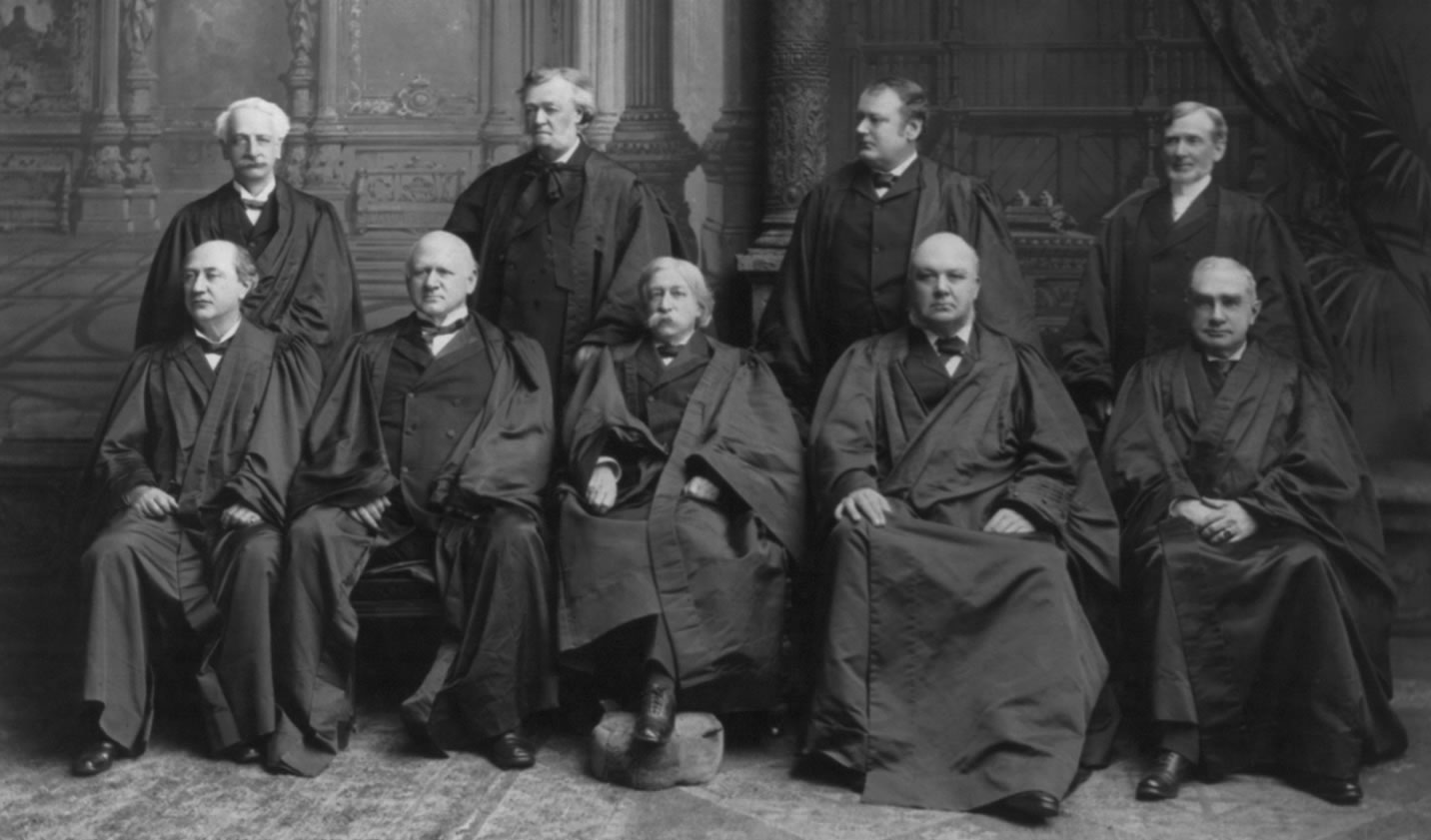
The Supreme Court, headed by Melville Fuller, 1898; with Harlan in the front row, second from left

=== Nomination ===
Though Harlan was considered for several positions in the new administration, most notably Attorney General, initially the only job he was offered was as a member of a commission sent to Louisiana to resolve disputed statewide elections there. Justice David Davis, however, had resigned from the Supreme Court in January 1877 after being elected to the Senate by the Illinois General Assembly. Seeking to appoint a Southerner to the Supreme Court in the aftermath of the acrimonious and disputed 1876 presidential election, Hayes settled on Harlan. Though Harlan's nomination prompted some criticism from Republican Stalwarts, he was confirmed unanimously by the Senate on November 29, 1877, and took the judicial oath of office on December 10, 1877.

=== Life on the court ===
Harlan greatly enjoyed his time as a justice, serving until his death in 1911. From the start, he established good relationships with his fellow justices and he was close friends with a number of them. Though Harlan often disagreed with the other justices, occasionally quite vociferously, he was able to separate differences over legal matters from personal relationship. During his tenure, money problems continually plagued him, particularly as he began to put his three sons through college. Debt was a constant concern, and in the early 1880s, he considered resigning from the Court and returning to private practice. He ultimately decided to remain on the Court, but supplemented his income by teaching constitutional law at the Columbian Law School, which later became the George Washington University Law School.

When Harlan began his service, the Supreme Court faced a heavy workload that consisted primarily of diversity and removal cases, with only a few constitutional issues. Justices also rode circuit in the various federal judicial circuits; though these usually corresponded to the region from which the justice was appointed, due to his junior status, Harlan was assigned the Seventh Circuit based in Chicago. Harlan rode the Seventh Circuit until 1896, when he switched to his home circuit, the Sixth, upon the death of its previous holder, Justice Howell Edmunds Jackson. Harlan became the senior associate justice on the Court following the retirement of Stephen Johnson Field in 1897, and he served as acting chief justice after the death of Melville Fuller in 1910.

=== Jurisprudence ===
During Harlan's tenure on the Supreme Court, major Supreme Court decisions tended to address issues arising from industrialization and the Reconstruction Amendments. Beginning in the 1880s, the Supreme Court increasingly began to adopt a laissez-faire philosophy, striking down economic regulations while at the same time allowing states to curtail the rights of African Americans. Harlan differed from many of his colleagues, often voting to uphold federal regulations and to protect the civil rights of African Americans. His judicial opinions were influenced by his life-long belief in a strong national government, his sympathy for the economically disadvantaged, and his view that the Reconstruction Amendments had fundamentally transformed the relationship between the federal government and the state governments. Though Harlan believed the Court had the power to review state and federal actions on a broad array of topics, he tended to oppose judicial activism in favor of deference to legislatures.

==== Earlier cases, 1877–1896 ====
Congress had passed the Civil Rights Act of 1875 in the waning days of Reconstruction, outlawing segregation in public accommodations such as railroads. The Supreme Court did not rule on the Civil Rights Act of 1875 until 1883, when it struck down the law in Civil Rights Cases. In his majority opinion, Justice Joseph P. Bradley held that the Thirteenth Amendment "simply abolished slavery," and that the Fourteenth Amendment did not authorize Congress to bar racial discrimination by private actors. Only Harlan dissented, vigorously, charging that the majority had subverted the Reconstruction Amendments: "The substance and spirit of the recent amendments of the constitution have been sacrificed by a subtle and ingenious verbal criticism." Harlan argued that the Fourteenth Amendment gave Congress the authority to regulate public accommodations, and further argued that the Thirteenth Amendment empowered Congress to "eradicate" the vestiges of slavery, such as restrictions on freedom of movement.

Harlan joined the Court's unanimous decision in Pace v. Alabama (1883), which ruled that anti-miscegenation laws were constitutional. Harlan was the first justice to argue that the Fourteenth Amendment incorporated the Bill of Rights (making rights guarantees applicable to the individual states), in Hurtado v. California (1884). Harlan was one of four justices to file a dissenting opinion in Pollock v. Farmers' Loan & Trust Co. (1895), which struck down a federal income tax levied by the Wilson–Gorman Tariff Act of 1894. Harlan described the majority opinion as a "disaster to the country" because it "impairs and cripples the just powers of the national government". He was the sole dissenter in another 1895 case, United States v. E. C. Knight Co., in which the Court severely curtailed the power of the federal government to pursue antitrust actions under the Sherman Antitrust Act. In his dissent, he wrote that "the common government of all the people is the only one that can adequately deal with a matter which directly and injuriously affects the entire commerce of the country." During the 1890s, he also wrote several dissents in cases where Court decisions curtailed the regulatory powers of the Interstate Commerce Commission (ICC).

==== Plessy v. Ferguson ====
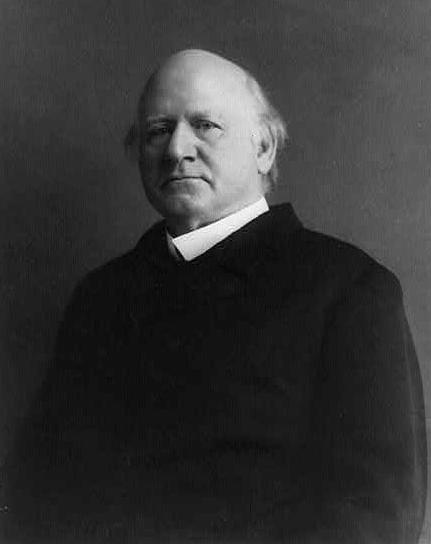
John Marshall Harlan

In 1896, Associate Justice Henry Billings Brown delivered the majority decision in Plessy v. Ferguson, which established the doctrine of "separate but equal". Whereas the Civil Rights Cases had struck down a federal law barring segregation by private actors, the Court's opinion in Plessy allowed state governments to engage in segregation. Rejecting the argument that segregation violated the Thirteenth Amendment, Brown wrote that "a statute which implies merely a legal distinction between the white and colored races has no tendency to destroy the legal equality of the two races, or reestablish a state of involuntary servitude." In response to the plaintiff's claims regarding the Fourteenth Amendment, Brown wrote that the Fourteenth Amendment was designed to "enforce the absolute equality of the two races before the law," but added that the amendment "could not have been intended to abolish distinction based upon color, or to enforce social, as distinguished from political, equality, or a commingling of the two races upon terms unsatisfactory to either".

Harlan, the lone dissenting justice, strongly disapproved of the majority opinion, writing that "the judgement this day rendered, will, in time, prove to be quite as pernicious as the decision made by this tribunal in the Dred Scott Case". He accepted the appellant's argument that the Thirteenth Amendment barred segregation in public accommodations, as he believed that segregation imposed "badges of slavery or servitude" upon African Americans. He also accepted the appellant's argument that the segregation in public accommodations violated the Fourteenth Amendment on the basis that these accommodations constituted "public highway[s]". He further wrote that "our Constitution is color-blind, and neither knows nor tolerates classes among citizens." Harlan rejected the idea that the law in question was race-neutral, writing that "everyone knows that the statute in question [was intended] to exclude colored people from coaches occupied by or assigned to white persons", adding that the law was "cunningly devised" to overturn the results of the Civil War.

Harlan did not embrace the idea of full social racial equality. While he had appeared to advocate for equality among those of different races and for a color-blind Constitution in his Plessy dissent, he also stated "[t]here is a race so different from our own that we do not permit those belonging to it to become citizens of the United States ... I allude to the Chinese race."

==== Later cases, 1897–1911 ====
In United States v. Wong Kim Ark (1898), Harlan joined Chief Justice Fuller's dissent proclaiming the dangers of having large numbers of Chinese immigrants in the United States. The Court's holding was that persons of Chinese descent born in the United States were citizens by birth. Fuller and Harlan argued that the principle of jus sanguinis (that is, the concept of a child inheriting their father's citizenship by descent regardless of birthplace) had been more pervasive in U.S. legal history since independence. In the view of the minority, excessive reliance on jus soli (birthplace) as the principal determiner of citizenship would lead to an untenable state of affairs in which "the children of foreigners, happening to be born to them while passing through the country, whether of royal parentage or not, or whether of the Mongolian, Malay or other race, were eligible to the presidency, while children of our citizens, born abroad, were not".

Harlan was also the most staunchly anti-imperialist justice of the Supreme Court, arguing consistently in the Insular Cases (from 1901 to 1905) that the Constitution did not permit the demarcation of different rights between citizens of the states and the residents of newly acquired territories in the Philippines, Hawaii, Guam, and Puerto Rico, a view that was consistently in the minority. In Hawaii v. Mankichi (1903) his opinion stated: "If the principles now announced should become firmly established, the time may not be far distant when, under the exactions of trade and commerce, and to gratify an ambition to become the dominant power in all the earth, the United States will acquire territories in every direction... whose inhabitants will be regarded as 'subjects' or 'dependent peoples,' to be controlled as Congress may see fit... which will engraft on our republican institutions a colonial system entirely foreign to the genius of our Government and abhorrent to the principles that underlie and pervade our Constitution."

Harlan delivered the majority opinion in Chicago, Burlington & Quincy Railroad Co. v. City of Chicago (1897), holding that due process required fair compensation to be given for any private property seized by the state. The decision incorporated the Fifth Amendment's Takings Clause, representing the first time that part of the Bill of Rights was applied to state governments. The Court would not incorporate another provision of the Bill of Rights until Gitlow v. New York (1925). Harlan wrote the majority opinion in Northern Securities Co. v. United States, the first time the Court upheld the use of the Sherman Antitrust Act to break up a large corporation. Harlan also wrote the majority opinion in Jacobson v. Massachusetts (1905) upholding the government's right to enforce vaccination requirements, and the majority opinion in Adair v. United States (1908), holding that Congress did not have the power to ban "yellow-dog contracts".

During his final years on the Court, Harlan continued to write dissents in major cases, such as Giles v. Harris (1903), a case challenging the use of grandfather clauses to restrict voting rolls and de facto exclude blacks. He also dissented in Lochner v. New York (1905), but he agreed with the majority "that there is a liberty of contract which cannot be violated even under the sanction of direct legislative enactment". In his dissent in Hodges v. United States (1906), Harlan reiterated his belief that the Thirteenth Amendment empowered Congress to protect African Americans from discrimination and violence. He was the lone dissenter in Ex parte Young (1908), arguing that the Eleventh Amendment prevented suits against state officials acting on behalf of the state. In his partial dissent in the 1911 case of Standard Oil Company of New Jersey v. United States, Harlan argued against the Court's establishment of the rule of reason, which held that in some extenuating circumstances a trust should not be broken up even if it has a monopoly. In both Standard Oil and United States v. American Tobacco Co. (1911), Harlan strongly criticized the majority opinion for adopting the rule of reason; as the rule was not present in the original legislation, he believed that the Court was usurping Congress's legislative prerogatives.

On March 12, 1906, Harlan donated a King James Version Bible to the Supreme Court. This Bible had become known as the "Harlan Bible". As of 2015, this Bible has been signed by every succeeding Supreme Court justice after taking the oath of office.

== Death ==
Harlan died on October 14, 1911, after 33 years serving on the Supreme Court, the third-longest tenure on the court up to that time and seventh-longest ever. He was the last veteran of the Waite Court to remain on the bench. He was buried in Rock Creek Cemetery, Washington, D.C., where his body resides along with those of three other justices.

== Personal life ==
=== Family ===
In December 1856, Harlan married Malvina French Shanklin, the daughter of an Indiana businessman. According to friends and Shanklin's memoirs, theirs was a happy marriage, which lasted until Harlan's death. They had six children, three sons and three daughters. Their eldest son, Richard, became a Presbyterian minister and served as president of Lake Forest College. Their second son, James S. Harlan, practiced in Chicago and served as attorney general of Puerto Rico and chairman of the Interstate Commerce Commission. Their youngest son, John Maynard Harlan, also practiced in Chicago and served as an alderman. John Maynard's son, John Marshall Harlan II, served as a Supreme Court Associate Justice from 1955 until 1971.

Harlan had suffered from financial problems throughout his tenure on the Court and left minimal assets for the support of his widow and two unmarried daughters. In the months following Harlan's death, leading members of the Supreme Court Bar established a fund for the benefit of the Harlan survivors.

=== Religious beliefs ===
Harlan was fervently religious, and legal scholar James W. Gordon argued that his faith "was the most important lens through which he viewed the people and events of his life". A conservative Presbyterian, he favored the Old School branch of that denomination, opposed higher criticism, and stridently adhered to Calvinism. During his tenure as a justice, he was an elder at the New York Avenue Presbyterian Church in Washington, D.C., and there he taught a Sunday school class of middle-aged men from 1896 until his death in 1911.

== Legacy ==
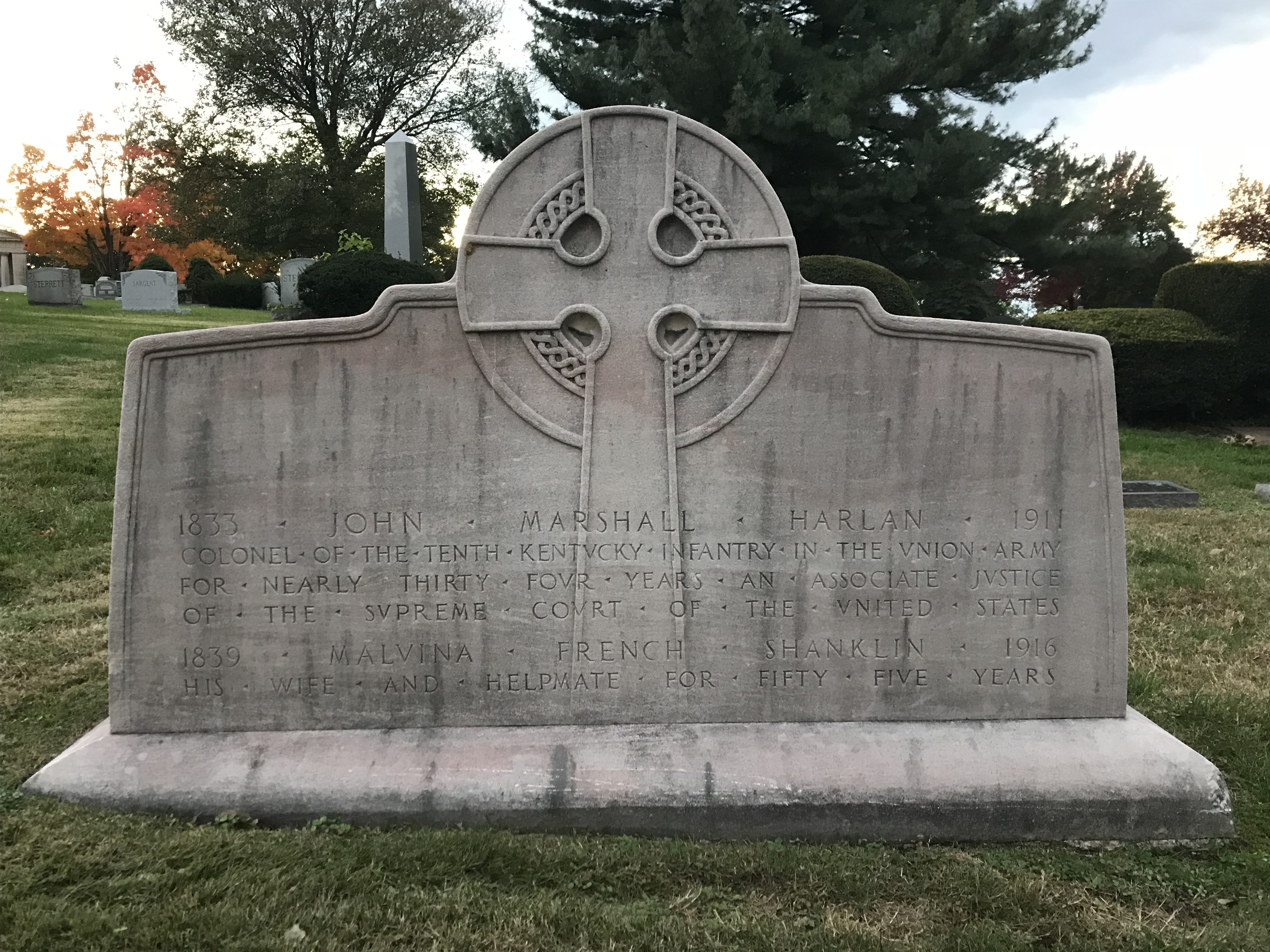
Harlan's gravesite

Harlan was largely forgotten in the decades after his death, but his reputation began to improve in the mid-twentieth century. Many scholars now consider him to be one of the greatest Supreme Court justices of his era. He is most known for his reputation as the "Great Dissenter". He is especially remembered for his dissent in Plessy v. Ferguson. Historian D. Grier Stephenson writes that "more than any justice with whom he served, Harlan understood the Reconstruction Amendments to establish a nationally protected right against racial discrimination, although it is a measure of the Court that he frequently articulated those promises in dissent". Legal scholar Bernard Schwartz writes that "Harlan's key dissents have generally been affirmed in the court of history. A century later, his rejection of the narrow view toward civil rights adopted by the Court majority has been generally approved." Harlan's view that the Fourteenth Amendment made the provisions of the Bill of Rights applicable to the states has largely been adopted by the Supreme Court. (Note: Harlan favored the total incorporation of the Bill of Rights, but the Supreme Court has instead selectively incorporated the Bill of Rights on a case-by-case basis.)

Harlan is commemorated by John Marshall Harlan Community Academy High School, a Chicago public high school, as well as by John Marshall Harlan High School in Texas. During World War II the Liberty ship SS John M. Harlan was built and named in his honor. Centre College, Harlan's alma mater, instituted the John Marshall Harlan Professorship in Government in 1994 in honor of Harlan's reputation as one of the Supreme Court's greatest justices. In 2025, Centre unveiled a bronze statue of Harlan located on their campus sculpted by Ed Hamilton. Named for Justice Harlan, the "Harlan Scholars" of the University of Louisville/Louis D. Brandeis School of Law is an undergraduate organization for students interested in attending law school. Collections of Harlan's papers are at the University of Louisville and at the Library of Congress in Washington. Other papers are collected at many other libraries.

== See also ==
- List of justices of the Supreme Court of the United States
- List of law clerks for the eighth seat of the Supreme Court of the United States
- List of United States Supreme Court justices by time in office
- United States Supreme Court cases during the Fuller Court
- United States Supreme Court cases during the Waite Court
- United States Supreme Court cases during the White Court
- List of United States federal judges by longevity of service

== Notes ==
Party political offices
Preceded by George M. Thomas	Republican nominee for Governor of Kentucky; 1871, 1875	Succeeded by Walter Evans
Legal offices
Preceded by Andrew James	Attorney General of Kentucky; 1863–1867	Succeeded by John Rodman
Preceded by David Davis	Associate Justice of the Supreme Court of the United States; 1877–1911	Succeeded by Mahlon Pitney
