= John Quincy Adams and abolitionism =

John Quincy Adams' thoughts on slavery

Like most contemporaries, John Quincy Adams's views on slavery evolved over time. He never joined the movement called "abolitionist" by historians—the one led by William Lloyd Garrison—because it demanded the immediate abolition of slavery and insisted it was a sin to enslave people. Further, abolitionism meant disunion and Adams was a staunch champion of American nationalism and union.

He often dealt with slavery-related issues during his seventeen-year congressional career, which began after his presidency. In the House, Adams became a champion of free speech, demanding that petitions against slavery be heard despite a "gag rule" that said they could not be heard. Adams repeatedly spoke out against the "Slave Power", that is the organized political power of the slave owners who dominated all the southern states and their representation in Congress. He vehemently attacked the annexation of Texas (1845) and the Mexican War (1846–1848) as part of a "conspiracy" to extend slavery. During the censure debate, Adams said that he took delight in the fact that southerners would forever remember him as "the acutest, the astutest, the archest enemy of southern slavery that ever existed".

Biographers Nagle and Parsons argue that he was not a true abolitionist, although he quickly became the primary enemy of slavery in Congress. Though he, like most anti-slavery contemporaries such as Henry Clay, held the preservation of the union as the primary goal, he increasingly became more forceful for the anti-slavery cause. Remini notes that Adams feared that the end of slavery could only come through civil war or the consent of the slave South, and not quickly and painlessly as the abolitionists wanted.

== Background ==
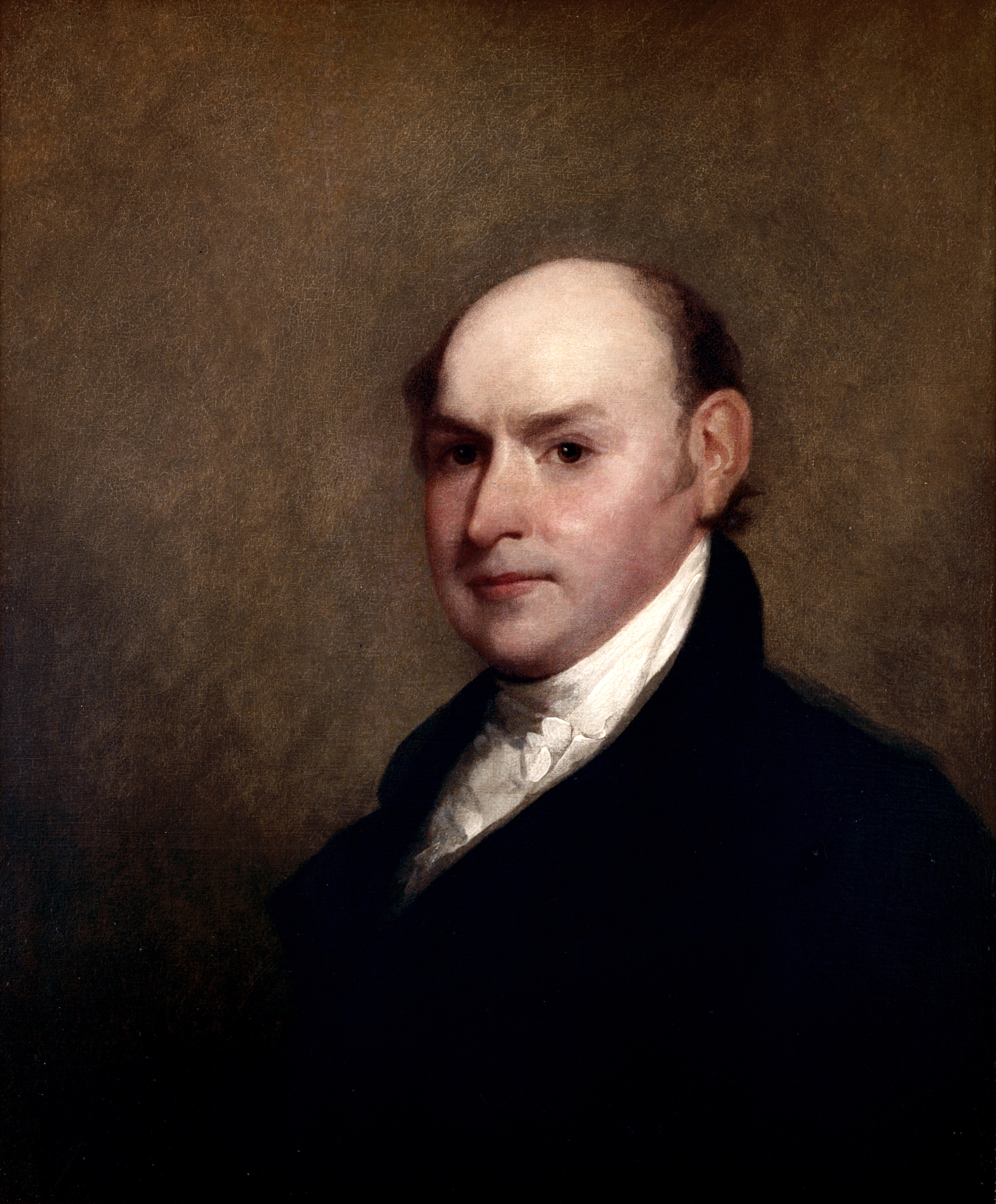
John Quincy Adams by Gilbert Stuart, 1818

John Quincy Adams was born into a family that never owned slaves, and was hostile to the practice. His mother, Abigail Adams, held strong anti-slavery views. His father, President John Adams, despite opposing a 1777 bill in Massachusetts to emancipate slaves, opposed slavery on principle and considered the practice of slavery abhorrent. Adams's career before his election to presidency in 1824 was focused on foreign policy where the slavery issue seldom came up. There were no major slavery-related controversies during his presidency. The union issue became hotly contested under his successor, Andrew Jackson, when South Carolina threatened to secede, partly due to the tariff. This event, the Nullification Crisis, was successfully resolved, with a lower tariff and an end to threats of disunion.

The debate on the Missouri Compromise in 1820 was a turning point for Adams. During that debate, he broke with his friend John C. Calhoun, who became the most outspoken national leader in favor of slavery. They became bitter enemies. Adams vilified slavery as a bad policy while Calhoun countered that the right to own slaves had to be protected from interference from the federal government to keep the nation alive. Adams said slavery contradicted the principles of republicanism, while Calhoun said that slavery was essential to American democracy, for it made all white men equal. Adams predicted that if the South formed a new nation, it would be torn apart by an extremely violent slave insurrection. If the two nations went to war, Adams predicted the president of the United States would use his war powers to abolish slavery. The two men became ideological leaders of the North and the South.

== Amistad case ==
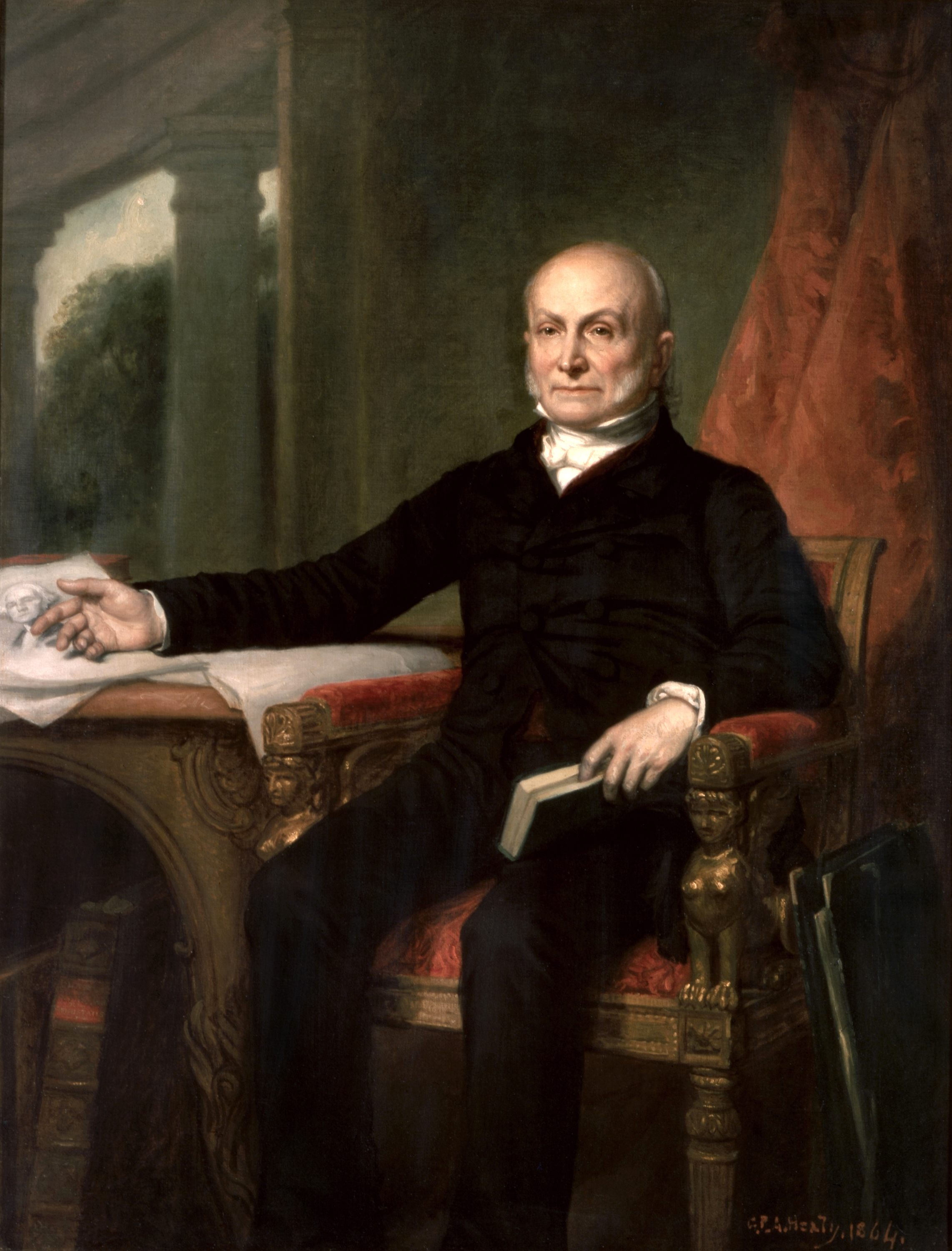
John Quincy Adams portrait.

In 1841, Adams had the case of a lifetime, representing the defendants in United States v. The Amistad Africans in the Supreme Court of the United States. He successfully argued that the Africans, who had seized control of a Spanish ship, La Amistad, on which they were being transported illegally as slaves, should not be extradited or deported to Spanish Cuba (where slavery was legal) but should be considered free. Under President Martin Van Buren, the government argued the Africans should be deported for having mutinied and killed officers on the ship. Adams won their freedom, with the chance to stay in the United States or return to Africa. Adams made the argument because the U.S. had prohibited the international slave trade, although it allowed internal slavery. He never billed for his services in the Amistad case. The speech was directed not only at the justices of this Supreme Court hearing the case, but also to the broad national audience he instructed in the evils of slavery.

== As member of Congress ==
Adams was elected to the United States House of Representatives in the 1830 elections as a National Republican. He was elected to eight terms, serving as a Representative for 17 years, from 1831 until his death in 1848, as a Whig. He became an important antislavery voice in the Congress and was regarded by Southern legislators as the "hell hound of abolition". In 1836 Southern Congressmen voted in a rule, called the "gag rule," that called for the immediate tabling of any petitions about slavery. Congress had been flooded with petitions signed by citizens protesting slavery; most originated from the Anti-Slavery Society based in New York. The Gag rule prevented discussion of slavery from 1836 to 1844, but Adams frequently managed to evade it by parliamentary skill.

He refused to honor the House's gag rule banning discussion or debate of the slavery issue. Using unconventional tactics, Adams evaded and ignored the gag rule until his persistence irritated his colleagues to the point that he was threatened with censure. Although the House never voted to censure Adams, the discussion ignited by his actions and the attempts of others to quiet him raised questions of the right to petition, the right to legislative debate, and the morality of slavery.

In 1837 he donated US$50 (equivalent to $1,423 in 2025) to Nathan Allen so that he could buy his enslaved wife Dorcas Allen and their two surviving children out of a Washington, D.C. slave jail.

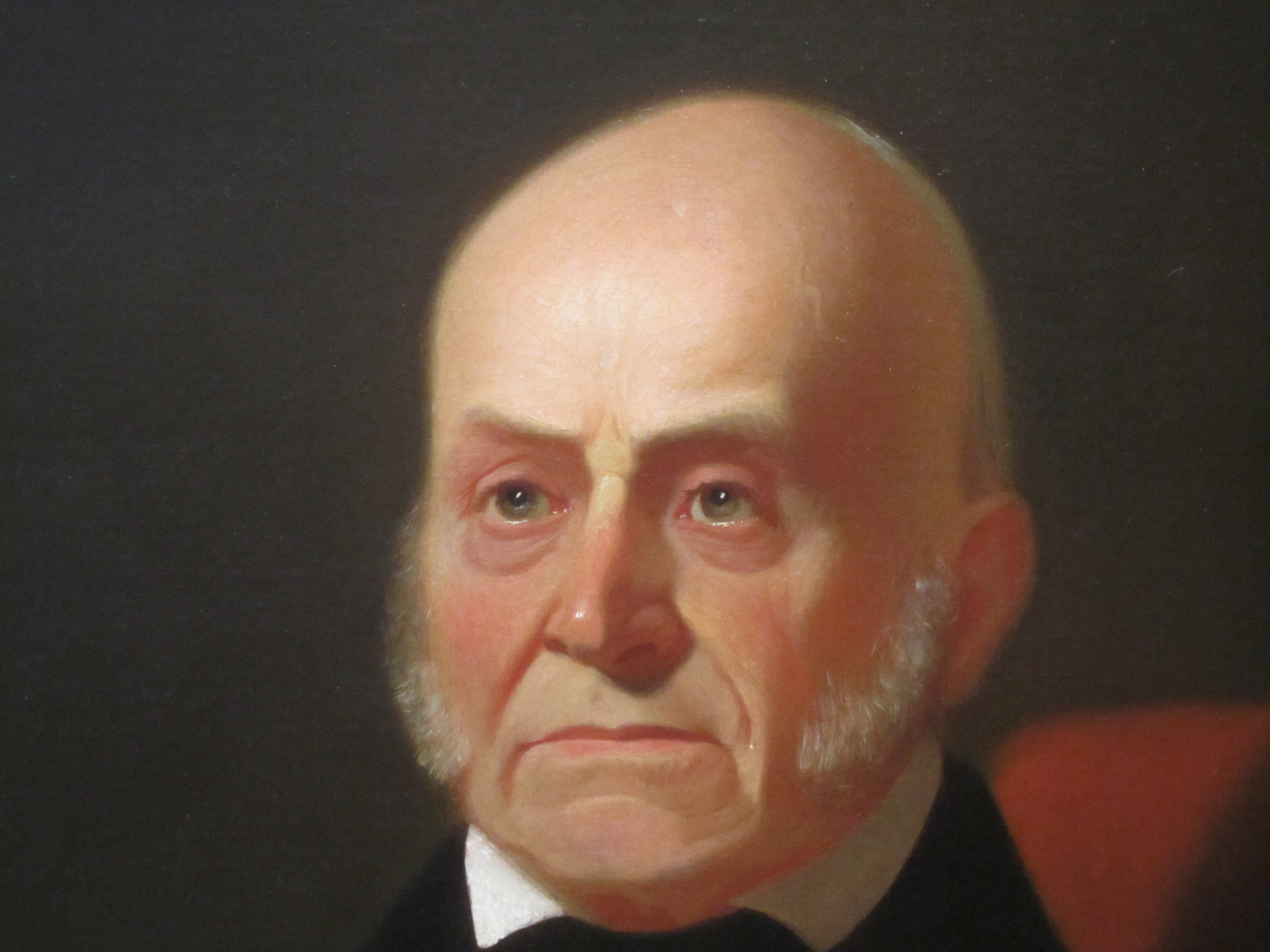
Adams as he appears in the National Portrait Gallery in Washington, D.C.

In the South, abolitionist tracts and publications were barred from the mail system. The result was that the issues of slavery and free speech began to intersect and therefore concerned larger portions of the American public. During the censure debate, Adams said that he took delight in the fact that southerners would forever remember him as "the acutest, the astutest, the archest enemy of southern slavery that ever existed".

=== Adams's petitions ===
Adams had been presenting anti-slavery petitions on the floor of the House since he was first elected to the Congress. He made it clear that it was a free speech issue, and that he personally disagreed with the demands for immediate abolition contained in the petitions. But he demanded they be heard. In the wake of the coinciding slavery and free speech debates surrounding the increasingly present abolitionist literature, the number of petitions brought to the house floor concerning the matter was multiplying rapidly. Some estimate that the numbers of petitions approached the tens of thousands in the first months of 1836. The southern congressmen, led by James Henry Hammond of South Carolina, moved to eliminate any discussion of the issue from the House floor. Hammond asked that any anti-slavery petitions submitted to the House not be accepted. Congress engaged in heated debate over the right to petition the government, but the "gag rule" soon came to be adopted, and any discussion of the slavery question and the presentation of any associated petition were banned. The practice was to immediately table any petition or resolution concerning slavery and never act on it thereafter.

Aside from the blow this action dealt to the expanding abolitionist movement, the gag rule also prompted questions of free speech and its role and limitations in the proceedings of the House of Representatives. The House is and was subject to its own Rules and the ability of the members to ban discussion of a national issue became fodder for intense debate.

Adams felt that he had to challenge not only the country's acceptance of slavery, but also the House's adoption of a rule that would limit debate of national issues and issues that were at the forefront of public debate. Adams used his formal legal training to mount an involved attack against the gag rule and against the movement to limit the congressional discussion of the contentious issue of slavery. At the time, there were a series of gag rules instituted at the urging of several southern members according to the parliamentary requirements of the House. Adams found creative and unique ways to continue challenging these same rules on different grounds and with different tactics.

External videos
- Presentation by William Lee Miller on Arguing About Slavery at the Adams National Historic Site, June 26, 1996, C-SPAN

In William Lee Miller’s book, Arguing about Slavery, the author chronicles much of John Quincy Adams's fight against this censorship of speech on the House floor. Adams engaged his colleagues first by requesting that petitions brought before the institution of the gag order be reviewed. Figuring that the gag rule could not pertain to items brought to the attention of the chair prior to its existence, Adams suggested the presentation of those petitions. This request was disallowed, now effectively making the gag rule a retroactive rule of the House. Adams then, with his colleague from Massachusetts, began to present a series of petitions from other nearby states and states up and down the eastern seaboard, as he was no longer allowed to present petitions from those in his own state. Both he and his colleague also presented petitions from women praying for abolition. Women, as non-voters, were not directly banned from petitioning per the gag rule. All of these parliamentary tricks were in vain, however, as the gag rule resulted in each being summarily dismissed.

Miller discusses Adams's actions on February 6, 1837 in great detail. On that day, John Quincy Adams stirred up the debate in the House with conniving adeptness by further challenges to the gag rule specifically as it concerned petitions. Adams began to present a petition from what he said were nine ladies from Fredericksburg, Virginia. Prevented from doing so by the house ban on such petitions, Adams moved on, but not without creating interest among his colleagues. One of the congressmen who was from Fredericksburg became intrigued as to who the nine abolitionist ladies from a proud slave-holding southern state were, and reviewed the petition. He then challenged Adams on the grounds that the women purported to have offered the petition were not "ladies" as Adams has suggested. The congressman from Virginia suggested that the women, if any existed, were free black women or women of mixed race, and implied that all were of questionable character. Adams amended his petition, saying it was a petition from women rather than ladies, but insisted he could still present it to the House. Adams’ challenge to the notions of his colleagues about what sort of citizens were appropriate candidates to petition was ill-received, but he would press farther still.

After his petition from the women of Fredericksburg was denied, Adams asked for clarification as to whether it was within the rules of the House to present a petition signed by twenty-two enslaved persons. His question ignited pandemonium in the House. Adams's colleagues came to the floor to express their disapproval, shock, indignation, and outrage. Many attacked the former president personally. Ultimately, congressman Dixon Hall Lewis of Alabama offered a motion that Congressman Adams be punished, and suggested that if Adams were not punished, all members from slaveholding states should protest by leaving the proceedings. Many members offered suggestions and objections until Congressman Waddy Thompson offered a motion to censure former president Adams and bring him before the speaker to receive a formal reprimand. The actual proposal for censure follows: Resolved, that J.Q. Adams, a member from the State of Massachusetts, by his attempt to introduce into this House a petition of slaves for the abolition of slavery in the District of Columbia, committed an outrage on the rights and feelings of a large portion of the people of the Union, a flagrant contempt on the dignity of this House; and by extending to slaves a privilege only belonging to freemen, directly incites the slave population to insurrection; and that the said member be forthwith called to the bar of the House, and censured by the Speaker.

Miller describes Adams's response as an intentionally understated and humble attempt at correcting the misinformation in the censure proposal. According to Miller, Adams took issue with the following: "The resolution charged him with attempting to present a petition from slaves asking for the abolition of slavery in the District of Columbia. In the first place, he would remind the House that he had not attempted to present the petition; he had simply asked for a ruling by the Speaker about the status of such a petition under the Hawes resolution".

Furthermore, Adams took issue with the assumption that the petition was a petition for the abolition of slavery. He informed the House that the petition was actually not asking for the members to consider abolishing slavery, but in fact was supplicating in favor of the opposite view. This revelation further angered the members of the House, who now believed that Adams was acting in contempt of the rules and decorum of the body. Miller suggests that while many of Adams's colleagues were enraged at his manipulation of the House and his deceptive tactics to control the debate, the true issue was that Adams had suggested that, regardless of its content, a petition by slaves would be considered legitimate.

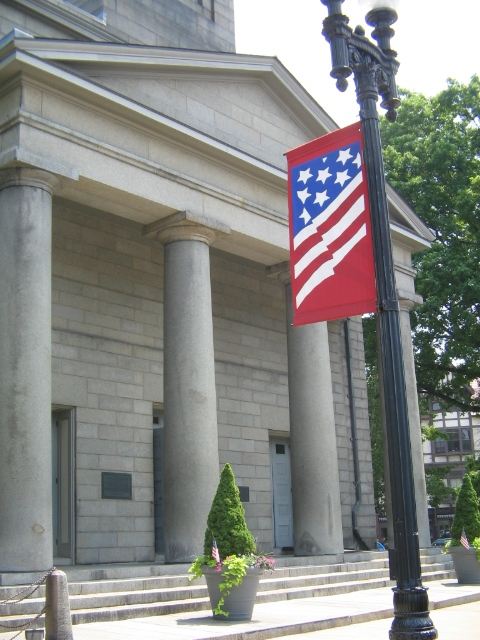
United First Parish Church

Over the next days, many of the members of the House rose to publicly condemn Adams and disparage his actions, but not all felt that he should be censured. Even two representatives of slaveholding states suggested that a censure of Adams could be conceived as an attack on the liberty of speech. Many of the congressmen from the northern states who spoke during the uproar would say the same, but few if any, would defend Adams absolutely. The only two congressmen to vocally defend Adams during the debate over censuring him were his Massachusetts colleagues: Caleb Cushing and Levi Lincoln.

Controversy remains over the origin of the petition of the slaves against Adams’ cause. Some suggest the petition was a ruse entirely fabricated by Adams or his allies to initiate the debate that ensued. Others believe the signatures were authentic but products of coercion or force. A contemporary of Adams alleged that the petition had been a hoax planned by enemies of Adams, designed to make him look ridiculous for presenting so many petitions by having him present a petition for his own expulsion by mistake.

Whatever the origin of the petition, Adams took advantage of his right to defend himself in front of the members to deliver days of prepared and impromptu remarks against slavery and in favor of abolition. He spoke against the slave trade and the ownership of slaves. Adams went so far as to suggest the dissolution of the Union on the grounds that to remain whole would mean supporting the institution of slavery and the views of southern slaveholders. To this end, he presented yet another signed petition that actually called to dissolve the union of states. He had angered his colleagues yet again, who now believed his censure necessary not only for trickery and indecency, but even for treason. As others continued to attack him and call for his censure, Adams continued to debate the issues of slavery and the evils of slaveholding. Adams had cleverly lifted the gag rule by debating slavery on the House floor in the moments he was allowed to rise in his defense against the threat of censure. Adams also called into question the actions of a House that would limit its own ability to debate and resolve questions internally. He forced his colleagues to consider the precedent they were setting for the legislative arm of the United States government if members could be censured for speech on the House floor.

On February 8, 1837, the United States House of Representatives voted to table the motion to censure Representative Adams. No further motion personal to Adams concerning his issue was accepted by the House, and so the former President of the United States was not censured by the House of Representatives. Years later, a more orchestrated attempt at censuring former-President Adams would take form, but this would be politically motivated and planned.

Although any move to censure Adams over the slavery petition was ultimately abandoned, the House did address the issue of petitions from enslaved persons. Adams rose again to argue that the right to petition was a universal right granted so that those in the weakest positions might always have recourse to those in the most powerful. Despite a rigorous defense launched by Adams, the house resolved almost unanimously, with the support of even the northerners who defended Adams, that the right to petition one's government applied only to free white persons.

The two resolutions passed at the end of this period of debate follow:

Resolved, that this House cannot receive the said petition without disregarding its own dignity, the rights of a large class of citizens of the South and West, and the constitution of the United States.

Resolved, That slaves do not possess the right of petition secured to the people of the United States by the constitution.

== See also ==
- List of opponents of slavery
- George Washington and slavery
- Thomas Jefferson and slavery
- Abraham Lincoln and slavery
- Andrew Jackson and the slave trade in the United States
