= 1983 Kentucky elections =

A general election was held in the U.S. state of Kentucky on November 8, 1983. The primary election for all offices was held on May 24, 1983.

== Secretary of State ==
1983 Kentucky Secretary of State election
Nominee	Drexell Davis	Ann Ross
Party	Democratic	Republican
Popular vote	474,698	320,996
Percentage	59.7%	40.3%
- County results Davis: 50–60% 60–70% 70–80% 80–90% Ross: 50–60% 60–70% 70–80%
Secretary of State before election
Frances Jones Mills
Democratic
Elected Secretary of State
Drexell Davis
Democratic

=== Results ===
1983 Kentucky Secretary of State election
Party	Candidate	Votes	%
Democratic	Drexell Davis	474,698	59.7
Republican	Ann Ross	320,996	40.3
Total votes		795,694	100.0
Democratic hold			

== Attorney General ==
1983 Kentucky Attorney General election
Nominee	Dave Armstrong	James G. Weddle
Party	Democratic	Republican
Popular vote	555,717	268,048
Percentage	67.5%	32.5%
- County results Armstrong: 50–60% 60–70% 70–80% 80–90% Weddle: 50–60% 60–70% 70–80%
Attorney General before election
Steve Beshear
Democratic
Elected Attorney General
Dave Armstrong
Democratic

=== Results ===
1983 Kentucky Attorney General election
Party	Candidate	Votes	%
Democratic	Dave Armstrong	555,717	67.5
Republican	James G. Weddle	268,048	32.5
Total votes		823,765	100.0
Democratic hold			

== Auditor of Public Accounts ==
1983 Kentucky Auditor of Public Accounts election
Nominee	Mary Ann Tobin	Ronald B. Halleck
Party	Democratic	Republican
Popular vote	503,954	280,331
Percentage	64.3%	35.7%
- County results Tobin: 50–60% 60–70% 70–80% 80–90% Halleck: 50–60% 60–70% 70–80%
Auditor of Public Accounts before election
James B. Graham
Democratic
Elected Auditor of Public Accounts
Mary Ann Tobin
Democratic

=== Results ===
1983 Kentucky Auditor of Public Accounts election
Party	Candidate	Votes	%
Democratic	Mary Ann Tobin	503,954	64.3
Republican	Ronald B. Halleck	280,331	35.7
Total votes		784,285	100.0
Democratic hold			

== State Treasurer ==
1983 Kentucky State Treasurer election
Nominee	Frances Jones Mills	Patricia C. Schafer
Party	Democratic	Republican
Popular vote	486,989	324,059
Percentage	60.0%	40.0%
- County results Mills: 50–60% 60–70% 70–80% 80–90% Schafer: 50–60% 60–70% 70–80%
State Treasurer before election
Drexell R. Davis
Democratic
Elected State Treasurer
Frances Jones Mills
Democratic

=== Results ===
1983 Kentucky State Treasurer election
Party	Candidate	Votes	%
Democratic	Frances Jones Mills	486,989	60.0
Republican	Patricia C. Schafer	324,059	40.0
Total votes		811,048	100.0
Democratic hold			

== Commissioner of Agriculture ==
1983 Kentucky Commissioner of Agriculture election
Nominee	David E. Boswell	Richard A. Turner
Party	Democratic	Republican
Popular vote	500,125	283,896
Percentage	63.8%	36.2%
- County results Boswell: 50–60% 60–70% 70–80% 80–90% >90% Turner: 50–60% 60–70% 70–80%
Commissioner of Agriculture before election
Alben W. Barkley II
Democratic
Elected Commissioner of Agriculture
David E. Boswell
Democratic

=== Results ===
1983 Kentucky Commissioner of Agriculture election
Party	Candidate	Votes	%
Democratic	David E. Boswell	500,125	63.8
Republican	Richard A. Turner	283,896	36.2
Total votes		784,021	100.0
Democratic hold			

== Superintendent of Public Instruction ==
1983 Kentucky Superintendent of Public Instruction election
Nominee	Alice McDonald	Kenneth E. Bland
Party	Democratic	Republican
Popular vote	535,831	281,970
Percentage	65.5%	34.5%
- County results McDonald: 50–60% 60–70% 70–80% 80–90% Bland: 50–60% 60–70%
Superintendent of Public Instruction before election
Raymond H. Barber
Democratic
Elected Superintendent of Public Instruction
Alice McDonald
Democratic

=== Results ===
1983 Kentucky Superintendent of Public Instruction election
Party	Candidate	Votes	%
Democratic	Alice McDonald	535,831	65.5
Republican	Kenneth E. Bland	281,970	34.5
Total votes		817,801	100.0
Democratic hold			

== Railroad Commission ==
Results by county: Democratic candidates: 50–60%; 60–70%; 70–80%; 80–90%; 100%; Republican candidates: 50–60%; 60–70%

The three members of the Kentucky Railroad Commission were elected to four-year terms.

== Kentucky Senate ==
The Kentucky Senate consists of 38 members. In 1983, half of the chamber (all odd-numbered districts) was up for election. Democrats maintained their majority, losing one seat. In 1983, senators were elected to five-year terms in order to move future elections to even-numbered years.

== Judicial elections ==
All judges of the Kentucky Court of Appeals and the Kentucky Circuit Courts were elected in non-partisan elections to eight-year terms.

== Local offices ==
=== Mayors ===
Mayors in Kentucky are elected to four-year terms. Prior to 1992, cities held their elections in odd-numbered years, in either the year preceding or following a presidential election.

=== City councils ===
Each incorporated city elected its council members to a two-year term.

== See also ==
- Elections in Kentucky
- Politics of Kentucky
- Political party strength in Kentucky
