= 1987 Kentucky elections =

A general election was held in the U.S. state of Kentucky on November 3, 1987. The primary election for all offices was held on May 26, 1987.

== Secretary of State ==
1987 Kentucky Secretary of State election
| Nominee | Bremer Ehrler | Ronald L. Sanders |
| Party | Democratic | Republican |
| Popular vote | 433,914 | 207,618 |
| Percentage | 67.6% | 32.4% |
- County results Ehrler: 50–60% 60–70% 70–80% 80–90% Sanders: 50–60% 60–70%
Secretary of State before election
Drexell R. Davis
Democratic
Elected Secretary of State
Bremer Ehrler
Democratic

=== Results ===
1987 Kentucky Secretary of State election
| Party | Candidate | Votes | % |
|---|---|---|---|
| Democratic | Bremer Ehrler | 433,914 | 67.6 |
| Republican | Ronald L. Sanders | 207,618 | 32.4 |
| Total votes | | 641,532 | 100.0 |
| Democratic hold | | | |

== Auditor of Public Accounts ==
1987 Kentucky Auditor of Public Accounts election
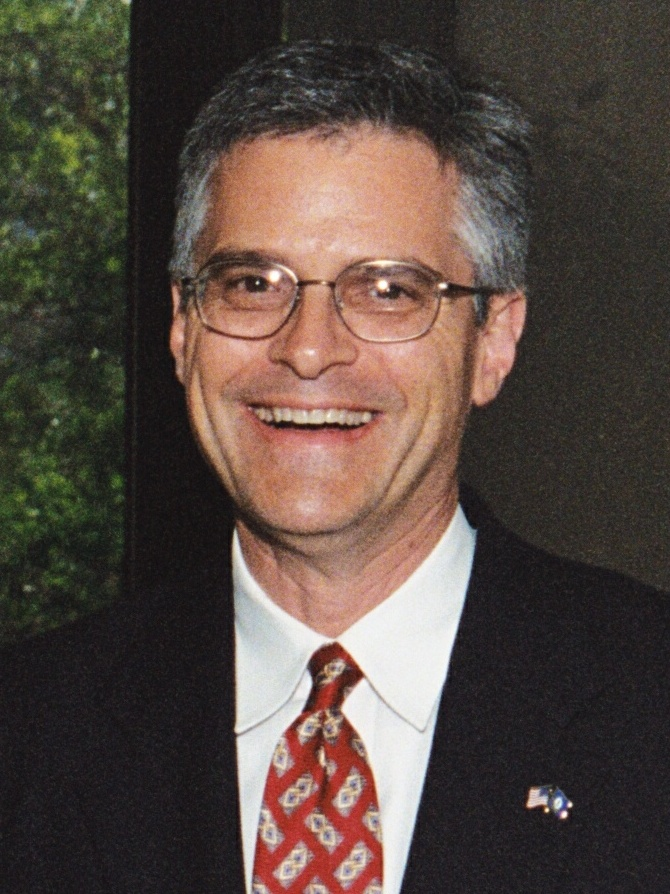

| Nominee | Bob Babbage | Beverly Griffin |
| Party | Democratic | Republican |
| Popular vote | 448,675 | 195,213 |
| Percentage | 69.7% | 30.3% |
- County results Babbage: 50–60% 60–70% 70–80% 80–90% 90–100% Griffin: 50–60% 60–70%
Auditor of Public Accounts before election
Mary Ann Tobin
Democratic
Elected Auditor of Public Accounts
Bob Babbage
Democratic

=== Results ===
1987 Kentucky Auditor of Public Accounts election
| Party | Candidate | Votes | % |
|---|---|---|---|
| Democratic | Bob Babbage | 448,675 | 69.7 |
| Republican | Beverly Griffin | 195,213 | 30.3 |
| Total votes | | 643,888 | 100.0 |
| Democratic hold | | | |

== State Treasurer ==
1987 Kentucky State Treasurer election
| Nominee | Robert Mead | Carol W. Reed |
| Party | Democratic | Republican |
| Popular vote | 422,977 | 214,366 |
| Percentage | 66.4% | 33.6% |
- County results Mead: 50–60% 60–70% 70–80% 80–90% 90–100% Reed: 50–60% 60–70%
State Treasurer before election
Frances Jones Mills
Democratic
Elected State Treasurer
Robert Mead
Democratic

=== Results ===
1987 Kentucky State Treasurer election
| Party | Candidate | Votes | % |
|---|---|---|---|
| Democratic | Robert Mead | 422,977 | 66.4 |
| Republican | Carol W. Reed | 214,366 | 33.6 |
| Total votes | | 637,343 | 100.0 |
| Democratic hold | | | |

== Commissioner of Agriculture ==
1987 Kentucky Commissioner of Agriculture election
| Nominee | Ward Burnette | John Underwood Jr. |
| Party | Democratic | Republican |
| Popular vote | 432,517 | 200,995 |
| Percentage | 68.3% | 31.7% |
- County results Burnette: 50–60% 60–70% 70–80% 80–90% 90–100% Underwood: 50–60% 60–70%
Commissioner of Agriculture before election
David Boswell
Democratic
Elected Commissioner of Agriculture
Ward Burnette
Democratic

=== Results ===
1987 Kentucky Commissioner of Agriculture election
| Party | Candidate | Votes | % |
|---|---|---|---|
| Democratic | Ward Burnette | 432,517 | 68.3 |
| Republican | John Underwood Jr. | 200,995 | 31.7 |
| Total votes | | 633,512 | 100.0 |
| Democratic hold | | | |

== Superintendent of Public Instruction ==
1987 Kentucky Superintendent of Public Instruction election
| Nominee | John Brock | Sue Daniel |
| Party | Democratic | Republican |
| Popular vote | 461,666 | 189,722 |
| Percentage | 70.9% | 29.1% |
- County results Brock: 50–60% 60–70% 70–80% 80–90% 90–100% Daniel: 50–60%
Superintendent of Public Instruction before election
Alice McDonald
Democratic
Elected Superintendent of Public Instruction
John Brock
Democratic

=== Results ===
1987 Kentucky Superintendent of Public Instruction election
| Party | Candidate | Votes | % |
|---|---|---|---|
| Democratic | John Brock | 461,666 | 70.9 |
| Republican | Sue Daniel | 189,722 | 29.1 |
| Total votes | | 651,388 | 100.0 |
| Democratic hold | | | |

== Railroad Commission ==
Results by county: Democratic candidates: 50–60%; 60–70%; 70–80%; 80–90%; >90%; Republican candidates: 50–60%; 60–70%

The three members of the Kentucky Railroad Commission were elected to four-year terms.

== Commonwealth’s Attorneys ==
Commonwealth's Attorneys, who serve as the prosecutors for felonies in the state, are elected to six-year terms. One attorney is elected for each of the 57 circuits of the Kentucky Circuit Courts.

== Circuit Clerks ==
Each county elected a Circuit Court Clerk to a six-year term.

== Local offices ==
=== Mayors ===
Mayors in Kentucky are elected to four-year terms. Prior to 1992, cities held their elections in odd-numbered years, in either the year preceding or following a presidential election.

=== City councils ===
Each incorporated city elected its council members to a two-year term.

== See also ==
- Elections in Kentucky
- Politics of Kentucky
- Political party strength in Kentucky
