= 1983 Kentucky lieutenant gubernatorial election =

- November 8, 1983
- Turnout: 56.2%
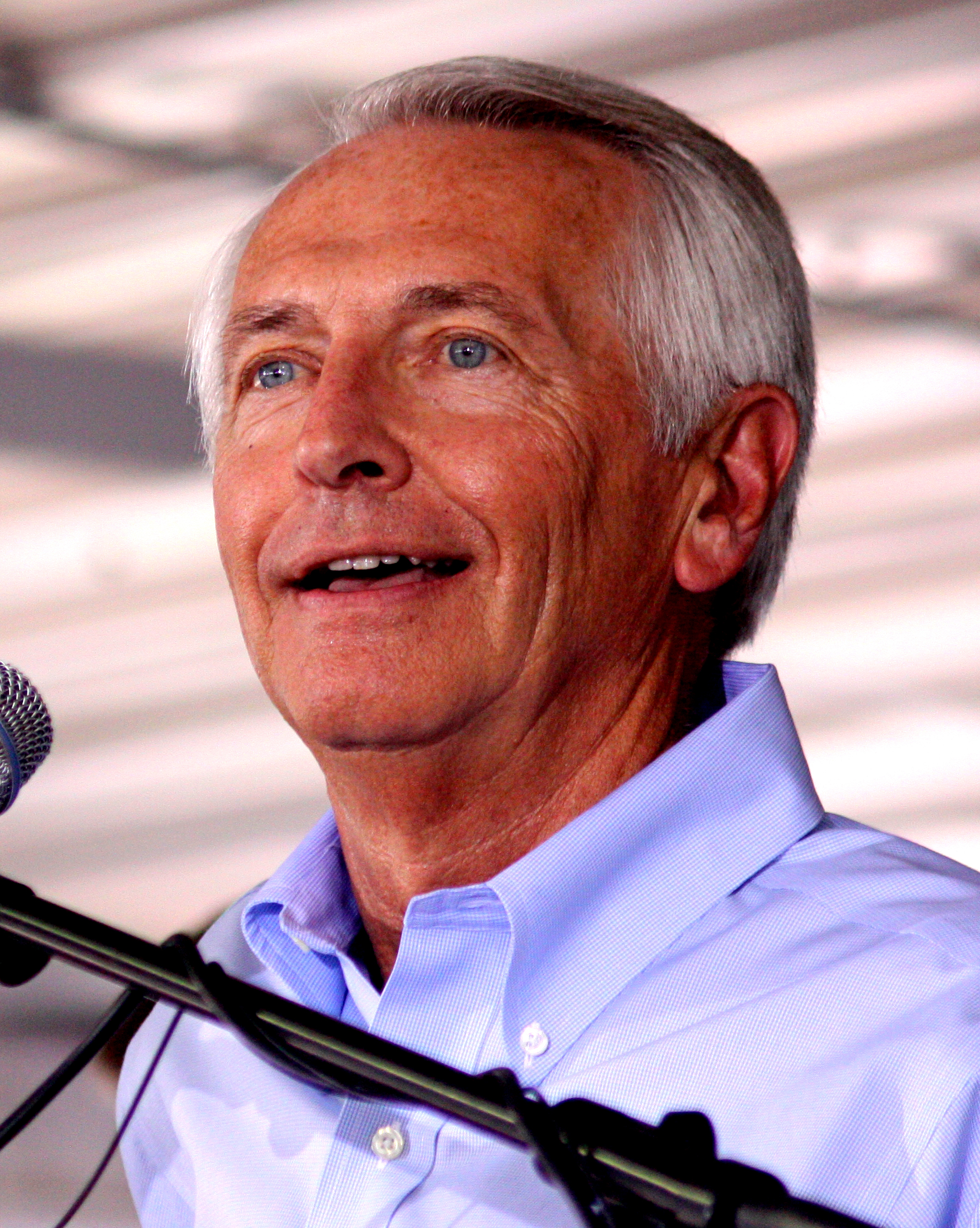

Nominee	Steve Beshear	Eugene P. Stuart
Party	Democratic	Republican
Popular vote	568,869	321,352
Percentage	63.35%	35.79%
- County results Beshear: 50–60% 60–70% 70–80% 80–90% Stuart: 50–60% 60–70%
Lieutenant Governor before election
Martha Layne Collins
Democratic
Elected Lieutenant Governor
Steve Beshear
Democratic

The 1983 Kentucky lieutenant gubernatorial election took place on November 8, 1983, to elect the lieutenant governor of Kentucky. Incumbent Democratic lieutenant governor Martha Layne Collins chose not to seek re-election to a second term, instead choosing to run for governor.

Incumbent Democratic Attorney General Steve Beshear beat Republican nominee Eugene P. Stuart.

== Democratic primary ==
=== Candidates ===
==== Nominee ====
- Steve Beshear, incumbent Attorney General.

==== Eliminated in primary ====
- George L. Atkins, former State Auditor (1976–1980) and cabinet secretary to governor John Y. Brown Jr.
- Alben W. Barkley II, incumbent Agriculture Commissioner and grandson of Alben W. Barkley.
- Bill Spivey, former University of Kentucky basketball player.
- Todd Hollenbach, former Jefferson County Judge/Executive (1970–1978), candidate for governor in 1975 and for this seat in 1979, and father of Todd Hollenbach IV.
- George Herman Kendall, Lexington real estate agent.
- Guy W. Rockefeller.

=== Results ===
May 24, Democratic primary
Party	Candidate	Votes	%
Democratic	Steve Beshear	183,662	31.94%
Democratic	George L. Atkins	156,038	27.13%
Democratic	Todd Hollenbach	126,364	21.98%
Democratic	Alben W. Barkley II	76,046	13.22%
Democratic	George H. Kendall	12,519	2.18%
Democratic	Guy W. Rockefeller	10,406	1.81%
Democratic	Bill Spivey	9,987	1.74%
Total votes		575,022	100.00%

== Republican primary ==
After McCubbin lost the Republican primary, he became an independent candidate for governor. This was because Kentucky law (commonly called Sore loser law) prevented a candidate who lost a primary to run in the general election for the same office they were defeated in. At the same time, Don Wiggins Jr., an unsuccessful candidate for governor in the Republican primary, ran as an independent in the lieutenant gubernatorial election on a ticket with McCubbin.

=== Candidates ===
==== Nominee ====
- Eugene P. Stuart, state senator from the 36th district.

==== Eliminated in primary ====
- Nicholas David McCubbin, Lexington lawyer.
- Tommy Klein, perennial candidate.

=== Results ===
May 24, Republican primary
Party	Candidate	Votes	%
Republican	Eugene P. Stuart	36,414	53.59%
Republican	Nicholas D. McCubbin	16,598	24.43%
Republican	Tommy Klein	14,932	21.98%
Total votes		67,944	100.00%

== General election ==
=== Candidates ===
- Democratic: Steve Beshear.
- Republican: Eugene P. Stuart.

=== Results ===
1983 Kentucky lieutenant gubernatorial election
Party	Candidate	Votes	%
Democratic	Steve Beshear	568,869	63.35%
Republican	Eugene P. Stuart	321,352	35.79%
Independent	Don Wiggins Jr.	7,728	0.86%
Total votes		897,949	100.00%
Democratic hold			
