= Drex =

Drex may refer to:

- Drex, informal name of Kentucky politician Drexell R. Davis
- Drex, nickname of Australian-Canadian radio personality Justin Wilcomes
- DREX, a coding scheme associated with the FMA instruction set
- Drex, a Brazilian central bank digital currency
- Drex, a supporting character in the television series Henry Danger
- Drex, short for Distortus rex, a fictional mutant Tyrannosaurus featured in Jurassic World Rebirth
