= Sam McElroy (politician) =

American politician (1921–2004)

Member of the Kentucky House of Representatives from the 7th district
- In office January 23, 1984 – January 1, 1995
- Preceded by: David Boswell
- Succeeded by: John Arnold

Personal details
- Born: April 14, 1921
- Died: October 17, 2004 (aged 83)
- Party: Democratic

Sam Martin McElroy (April 14, 1921 – October 17, 2004) was an American politician from Kentucky who was a member of the Kentucky House of Representatives from 1984 to 1995. McElroy was first elected in a January 1984 special election following the resignation of incumbent representative David Boswell to become Kentucky Commissioner of Agriculture. McElroy did not seek reelection in 1994.

He died in October 2004 at age 83.
