= Kentucky's 7th House of Representatives district =

American legislative district

Kentucky's 7th State House of Representatives district
Representative
Suzanne Miles; R–Owensboro
since January 7, 2014
- Registration: 45.6% Republican; 44.5% Democratic; 9.3% No party preference
- Demographics: 84.8% White; 4.8% Black; 3.2% Hispanic; 3.2% Asian; 0.2% Native American; 0.9% Other; 2.9% Multiracial
- Population (2023): 48,597
- Registered voters (2025): 36,551

Kentucky's 7th House of Representatives district is one of 100 districts in the Kentucky House of Representatives. Located in the western part of the state, it comprises part of Daviess County. It has been represented by Suzanne Miles (R–Owensboro) since 2014. As of 2023, the district had a population of 48,597.

== Voter registration ==
On January 1, 2025, the district had 36,551 registered voters, who were registered with the following parties.

Party	Registration	
Party	Voters	%
Republican	16,669	45.60
Democratic	16,266	44.50
Independent	1,489	4.07
Libertarian	169	0.46
Constitution	21	0.06
Green	20	0.05
Socialist Workers	4	0.01
Reform	2	0.01
"Other"	1,911	5.23
Total	36,551	100.00
Source: Kentucky State Board of Elections

== List of members representing the district ==
Member	Party	Years	Electoral history	District location
David Boswell (Owensboro)	Democratic	January 1, 1978 – January 2, 1984	Elected in 1977. Reelected in 1979. Reelected in 1981. Resigned after being elected Agriculture Commissioner.	1974–1985; Daviess (part), Henderson (part), and Union Counties.
Sam McElroy (Waverly)	Democratic	January 23, 1984 – January 1, 1995	Elected to finish Boswell's term. Reelected in 1984. Reelected in 1986. Reelected in 1988. Reelected in 1990. Reelected in 1992. Retired.	1974–1985; Daviess (part), Henderson (part), and Union Counties.
Sam McElroy (Waverly)	Democratic	January 23, 1984 – January 1, 1995	Elected to finish Boswell's term. Reelected in 1984. Reelected in 1986. Reelected in 1988. Reelected in 1990. Reelected in 1992. Retired.	1985–1993; Daviess (part), Henderson (part), and Union Counties.
Sam McElroy (Waverly)	Democratic	January 23, 1984 – January 1, 1995	Elected to finish Boswell's term. Reelected in 1984. Reelected in 1986. Reelected in 1988. Reelected in 1990. Reelected in 1992. Retired.	1993–1997; Daviess (part), Henderson (part), and Union Counties.
John Arnold (Sturgis)	Democratic	January 1, 1995 – September 13, 2013	Elected in 1994. Reelected in 1996. Reelected in 1998. Reelected in 2000. Reelected in 2002. Reelected in 2004. Reelected in 2006. Reelected in 2008. Reelected in 2010. Reelected in 2012. Resigned.	1993–1997; Daviess (part), Henderson (part), and Union Counties.
John Arnold (Sturgis)	Democratic	January 1, 1995 – September 13, 2013	Elected in 1994. Reelected in 1996. Reelected in 1998. Reelected in 2000. Reelected in 2002. Reelected in 2004. Reelected in 2006. Reelected in 2008. Reelected in 2010. Reelected in 2012. Resigned.	1997–2003
John Arnold (Sturgis)	Democratic	January 1, 1995 – September 13, 2013	Elected in 1994. Reelected in 1996. Reelected in 1998. Reelected in 2000. Reelected in 2002. Reelected in 2004. Reelected in 2006. Reelected in 2008. Reelected in 2010. Reelected in 2012. Resigned.	2003–2015
Suzanne Miles (Owensboro)	Republican	January 7, 2014 – present	Elected to finish Arnold's term. Reelected in 2014. Reelected in 2016. Reelected in 2018. Reelected in 2020. Reelected in 2022. Reelected in 2024. Reelected in 2026.	2003–2015
Suzanne Miles (Owensboro)	Republican	January 7, 2014 – present	Elected to finish Arnold's term. Reelected in 2014. Reelected in 2016. Reelected in 2018. Reelected in 2020. Reelected in 2022. Reelected in 2024. Reelected in 2026.	2015–2023
Suzanne Miles (Owensboro)	Republican	January 7, 2014 – present	Elected to finish Arnold's term. Reelected in 2014. Reelected in 2016. Reelected in 2018. Reelected in 2020. Reelected in 2022. Reelected in 2024. Reelected in 2026.	2023–present
