= David Logan (Kentucky politician) =

American politician

2nd Kentucky State Treasurer
- In office 1807–1808
- Preceded by: John Logan
- Succeeded by: John Pendelton Thomas

Personal details
- Relations: John Logan (father or uncle)

David Logan was an American politician who served as Kentucky State Treasurer from 1807 to 1808. He was appointed treasurer by Governor Christopher Greenup to fill the unexpired term of John Logan, who died in office. It is unknown if David was the son of John or his elder brother Benjamin Logan, who also had a son named David.
