= John Logan (pioneer) =

American pioneer and politician (1747–1807)

1st Kentucky State Treasurer
- In office 1792–1807
- Preceded by: New office
- Succeeded by: David Logan

Kentucky State Senator
- In office 1792–1792
- Preceded by: New office
- Succeeded by: Henry Pawling

Member of the Virginia House of Delegates for Lincoln County
- In office October 19, 1789 – December 20, 1791 Serving with Henry Pawling, Baker Ewing, Thomas Todd
- Preceded by: James Knox
- Succeeded by: position abolished
- In office May 3, 1784 – January 7, 1785 Serving with George Slaughter
- Preceded by: John Edwards
- Succeeded by: Benjamin Logan

Personal details
- Born: 1747 Augusta County, Colony of Virginia
- Died: July 1807 (aged 59–60) Frankfort, Kentucky
- Resting place: Stanford, Lincoln County, Kentucky
- Spouse: Jane McClure
- Relations: Benjamin Logan (brother); Stephen T. Logan (grandson)

Military service
- Branch/service: Virginia and Kentucky militias
- Rank: Colonel
- Battles/wars: Lord Dunmore's War, American Revolutionary War

John Logan (1747 – July 1807) was a military officer, farmer and politician from Virginia who became a pioneer in and helped found the state of Kentucky. He served under his brother, Benjamin during Lord Dunmore's War in 1774, then both moved to what was then called Kentucky County, Virginia. Logan took part in several expeditions against the Shawnee, including some led by Daniel Boone, John Bowman, and George Rogers Clark. After Kentucky County was split into three counties, Logan and his brother at various times represented Lincoln in the Virginia House of Delegates, and John Logan also represented that county at the Virginia Ratification Convention in 1788.

When Kentucky became a state in 1792, Logan briefly served in the Kentucky Senate, before accepting appointment as the state's first treasurer, an office he held continuously until his death in 1807. After being becoming treasurer, he moved to Franklin County, where he became one of the first trustees of the city of Frankfort, which became the state capital. He also represented Franklin County at the 1799 state constitutional convention and later became the county's first circuit court judge.

== Early life ==
John Logan was born to David and Jane (McKinley) Logan in the spring of 1747 in then-vast Virginia County. He was baptized by Rev. John Craig in Augusta County on the 10th of May 1747. His parents had immigrated from Ireland by way of Pennsylvania, before settling in the Shenandoah Valley in the "Borden Track." He had seven siblings.

His father died in 1757, leaving no will, so by primogeniture his entire estate passed to his oldest son Benjamin when he came of age in 1764. Benjamin sold the entire estate and divided the money among himself and his brothers and sisters. Benjamin and his brother, Hugh, used their shares to purchase a farm near the headwaters of the James River, and their sister Jane joined them there. John Logan soon purchased 200 acres (0.81 km^{2}) of land for himself near his family. In the early 1770s, he married Jane McClure; they had six daughters and a son. Benjamin Logan moved again, this time further down the Wilderness Road in the then-vast but newly formed Botetourt County. They settled on the Holston River, and John and his wife followed in 1773, establishing their home at Black's Fort (now the city of Abingdon, Virginia).

== Virginia officer and politician ==
In 1774, Logan served as a non-commissioned officer in a militia unit led by his brother Benjamin during Lord Dunmore's War. His unit arrived too late to participate in the Battle of Point Pleasant, but were able to accompany Lord Dunmore during his invasion of the Shawnee lands beyond the Ohio River.

In 1776, Benjamin Logan made claims for himself and several members of his family, including John, in Kentucky County, Virginia along the Dix River, although the family did not immediately move there. John Logan joined the local militia in several excursions against the Indians. During one engagement, a bullet severed the forefinger of Logan's right hand. In August 1778, Logan and Daniel Boone led an unauthorized expedition against the Shawnee known as the Paint Creek Expedition. The party engaged a small detachment of Shawnees with indecisive results before retreating; the Shawnee group may have been sent in advance of the larger war party that later laid siege to the Boonesborough settlement.

In 1779, Logan answered John Bowman's call for volunteers for a campaign against the Shawnee. On May 30, 1779, he participated in a raid on the Shawnee village of Chillicothe. In July, he led troops which safely conveyed gunpowder and ammunition from Boonesborough to the fort at St. Asaph's (near the present-day city of Stanford, Kentucky). Later that year, his brother Benjamin was promoted to colonel and John Logan was promoted to captain assumed command of his brother's old unit. In 1780, he was ordered to bring four-fifths of his company to the mouth of the Licking River for a retaliatory mission against the Indians, who had combined with British forces to overwhelm the settlements of Ruddle's Station and Martin's Station. George Rogers Clark led the mission, which completely destroyed the Shawnee settlements of Chillicothe and Pekowee in August 1780.

In January 1781, the Virginia legislature created three counties from the formerly vast Kentucky County. John Logan's property lay in newly created Lincoln County. When the county court of Lincoln County was organized at Harrodsburg on January 16, 1781, both John and Benjamin Logan were appointed as justices; this was the first court organized in what would become the state of Kentucky. At the first meeting of the county court, John Bowman became lieutenant of the county militia and Stephen Trigg became its colonel. Benjamin Logan and James Harrod received commissions as lieutenant colonel and major, respectively, but both declined because they thought they deserved a higher rank. Governor Thomas Jefferson recommended John Logan as the lieutenant colonel and Hugh McGary as the unit's major. However, John Logan was not sworn in as lieutenant colonel until January 16, 1782.

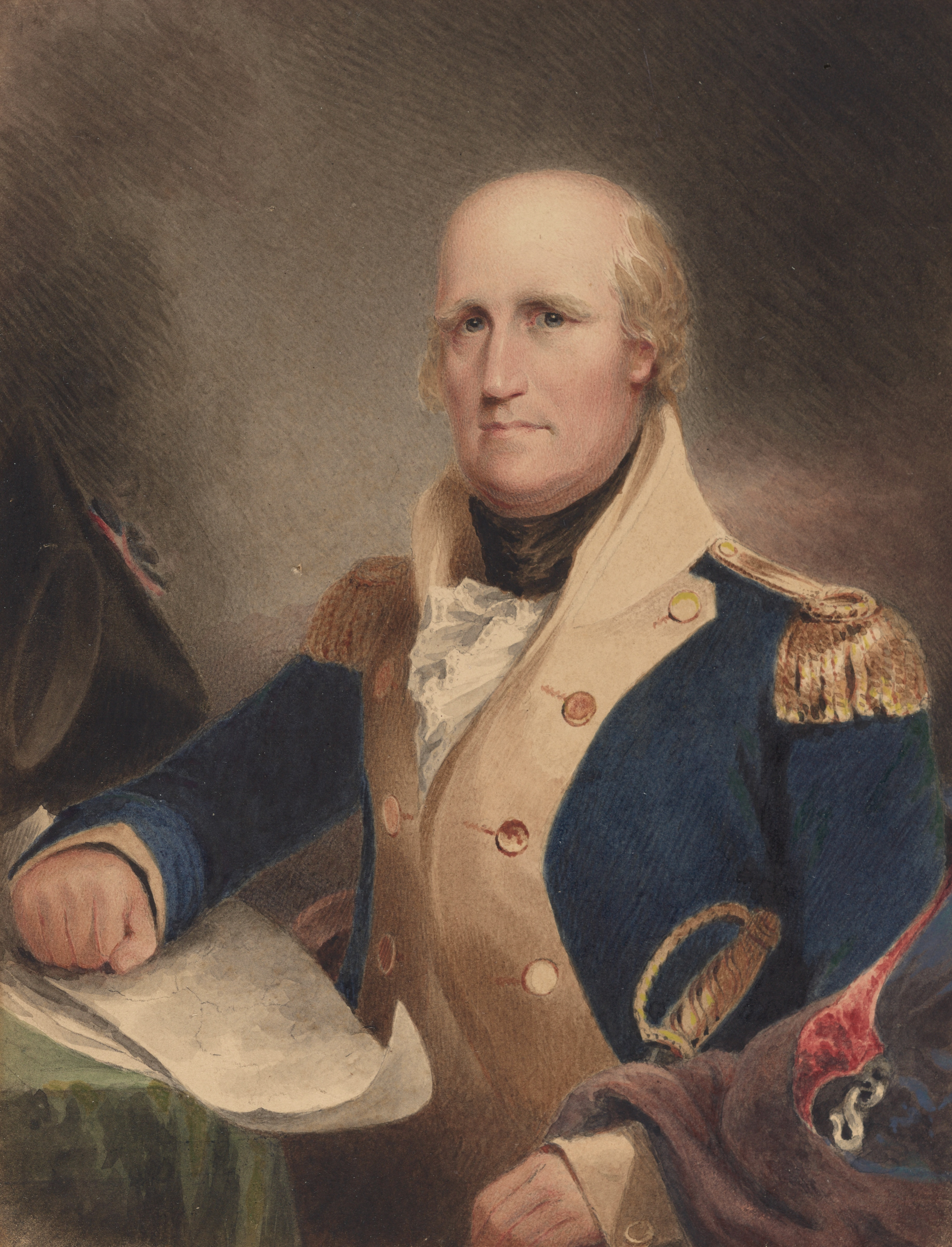
George Rogers Clark commanded Logan in several campaigns against the Shawnee

Logan briefly led George Rogers Clark's militiamen who were building a fleet of armed boats and fortifications and Louisville later that year. In August 1782, he was ordered to gather as many men as possible and pursue the Indians that had attacked Bryan Station. At Lexington, Logan met his brother Benjamin and the remnants of an advance party led by Stephen Trigg and Fayette County Lieutenant John Todd. Trigg and Todd's soldiers had been soundly defeated at the Battle of Blue Licks; Trigg and Todd, along with two majors, five captains, and five lieutenants were among the casualties. The combined force returned to the battlefield at Blue Licks, but their Native American opponents had already returned north of the Ohio River, so the men returned to their homes. In November, John Logan participated in George Rogers Clark's retaliatory mission that destroyed the native settlements at McKee's Town, Willstown, and Standing Stone.

Virginia governor Benjamin Harrison commissioned Logan as colonel of the Lincoln County militia. He formally replaced Stephen Trigg on July 22, 1783, although he had already been functioning as such for three months. Meanwhile, Lincoln County voters elected Logan and George Slaughter as their (part-time) representatives to the Virginia House of Delegates in 1784. Required to cross the Appalachian Mountains to Richmond to attend, Logan arrived late to the session, and consequently served on no committees. Nonetheless, he helped defeat a resolution calling for the repeal of laws that conflicted with the Treaty of Paris and voted with the majority to restrict the ports that could be used by foreign vessels. When the town of Stanford was established in March 1786, Logan was named one of its first trustees.

In October 1785, Logan and twenty-two militiamen recovered property and prisoners from an Indian raiding party that had attacked several families camped along the Wilderness Road. He again joined George Rogers Clark for an expedition against the Shawnee in October 1786, but was later critical of Clark's actions during the campaign. He co-signed a letter to Governor Edmund Randolph claiming that Clark had, without proper authority, enlisted men and commissioned officers for a garrison at Vincennes and confiscated Spanish property to supply the garrison.

On December 12, 1786, Logan was sworn in as sheriff of Lincoln County. In February 1787, Logan gathered a group of militiamen to avenge the killing of a Virginian named Luttrell by natives near Somerset. Logan tracked the raiders over the Cumberland River into what is now Tennessee. He and his men attacked the group of Cherokees – killing seven of them – and recovered horses, pelts, and other items believed to belong to settlers in the area. The Cherokee who survived Logan's attack formally protested his actions to the government of Virginia. Governor Randolph ordered Harry Innes, attorney general for the state's western district, to prosecute Logan for violating the terms of the United States' treaty with the Indians, but Innes refused, citing Logan's recovery of items belonging to Virginian settlers as proof that his actions had been justified. No other action was taken against Logan.

During the 1780s, Logan served as a delegate to the first, fourth, sixth, and seventh Kentucky statehood conventions in Danville. In June 1788, he represented Lincoln County at the Virginia convention to consider ratification of the United States Constitution. Logan and nine of the other thirteen delegates from what is now Kentucky voted against ratification, but the convention voted 88–78 in favor of it. Logan fear federal power without the inclusion of a bill of rights. The following year, John Logan replaced his brother Benjamin as lieutenant of Lincoln County following Benjamin's resignation. Meanwhile, Virginia conducted a tax census, which listed both John and Benjamin as non-residents of Lincoln County, but taxed each for slaves and livestock in the county, John for three enslaved adults and two younger slaves, as well as seven horses, a stud horse, and 30 cattle, and Benjamin for three adult slaves, five younger slaves, eight horses and 70 cattle. However, he was still considered a resident of Botetourt County, where he owned three adult slaves, three younger slaved, 13 horses and a stud horse, and 20 cattle.

In 1789, Lincoln County voters elected John Logan to the first of three consecutive terms in the Virginia House of Delegates. During the 1789 term, Logan helped draft the legislation authorizing the separation of Kentucky from Virginia. In 1790, he helped author a bill providing funds to clear obstacles from the Wilderness Road; he was named as one of the supervisors of the work, along with Henry Innes, Isaac Shelby, Samuel McDowell, and John Miller.

== Kentucky politician ==
When Kentucky became a state in 1792, Logan was chosen as a member of the state senate. Just two weeks after the Senate convened for the first time on June 4, 1792, a joint ballot of the House and Senate was taken to select a state treasurer, and Logan was unanimously chosen for the office. A week after the ballot, he resigned his position in the Senate and assumed the post of treasurer. As treasurer, Logan had the difficult task of financing the state using a combination of currencies from the Netherlands, France, Austria, Prussia, Portugal, Italy, and elsewhere. The situation was complicated when the federal government refused to redeem the paper money issued by the states of Virginia, Pennsylvania, and North Carolina to finance the Revolutionary War, rendering these notes worthless. In the early days of the Commonwealth, tobacco, animal pelts, and land warrants were more useful as currency than paper notes. At times, Logan had to personally borrow money to cover the state's obligations.

With near-total autonomy over the state's finances, Logan created the county offices of justice of the peace, sheriff, auditor, and surveyor and set their salaries. Logan was also charged with finding a way to ensure adequate defense of the frontier state; he divided the state into districts based on population in order to ensure equitable conscription of soldiers for the state militia.

While the state treasurer, Logan also became one of the trustees for the city of Frankfort in December 1794, and also served on a five-man commission to oversee the construction of the jail there. In 1799, he represented Franklin County at the constitutional convention that produced the second Constitution of Kentucky. Logan became a trustee of the Kentucky Seminary in 1800, and was appointed the first circuit judge of Franklin County, presiding over the court's first session on April 18, 1803.

== Death and legacy ==
John Logan continued to serve as state treasurer until his death in July 1807 at Frankfort. His remains were returned to Lincoln County for burial at the Fort Harrod Pioneer Cemetery, now part of Old Fort Harrod State Park.

David Logan served the remainder of the term, although records are unclear whether this was his son or his nephew (his brother Benjamin's son was also named David). Logan's son David married the daughter of Stephen Trigg and their son, Stephen Trigg Logan, became a judge in Illinois and a law partner of Abraham Lincoln.

Political offices
Preceded by new office	Treasurer of Kentucky; 1792–1807	Succeeded by David Logan
