= Delbert Murphy =

American politician

Member of the Kentucky Senate from the 8th district
- In office December 1967 – January 1, 1991
- Preceded by: Wendell Ford
- Succeeded by: David Boswell

Personal details
- Born: March 8, 1929
- Died: April 26, 1995 (aged 66)
- Party: Democratic

Delbert S. Murphy (March 8, 1929 – April 26, 1995) was an American politician from Kentucky who was a member of the Kentucky Senate from 1967 to 1991. Murphy was first elected in a December 1967 special election, following the resignation of incumbent senator Wendell Ford. He did not seek reelection in 1990.

On June 15, 1972, Murphy was one of seven Democratic senators that voted against Kentucky's ratification of the Equal Rights Amendment.

Murphy died in April 1995 at age 66.
