= Mason Brown =

American politician (1799–1867)

8th Kentucky State Treasurer
- In office 1865–1867
- Preceded by: James H. Garrard
- Succeeded by: James W. Tate

36th Secretary of State of Kentucky
- In office 1855–1859
- Governor: Charles S. Morehead
- Preceded by: Grant Green
- Succeeded by: Thomas Bell Monroe Jr.

Personal details
- Born: November 10, 1799
- Died: January 27, 1867 (aged 67)
- Parents: John Brown (father); Margaretta Mason (mother)
- Relatives: Orlando Brown (brother); John M. Mason (maternal uncle)

Mason Brown (November 10, 1799 – January 27, 1867) was an American politician who served as secretary of state of Kentucky and Kentucky state treasurer.

Mason Brown was born November 10, 1799, in Philadelphia, Pennsylvania, to John Brown and Margaretta (Mason) Brown. At the time of his birth, his father was a U.S. Senator from Kentucky. His mother was a sister of John M. Mason, D. D.

Brown was reared at Liberty Hall, his parents' estate in Frankfort, Kentucky. His early education was obtained through private tutors. He joined the Sophomore Class in Yale College in 1817, graduating in 1820. After graduation, he returned to Frankfort and studied law. He entered the law office of John J. Crittenden. He completed his studies in the Law School at Lexington, and began the practice of law in Maysville. After a few years he removed to Frankfort and became the law partner of Benjamin Mills, and subsequently, of Charles S. Morehead.

In 1825, Brown married Judith A. Bledsoe of Lexington, Kentucky. She was the daughter of former U.S. Senator Jesse Bledsoe. The couple had one son, Benjamin Gratz Brown, who went on to become a U.S. Senator from Missouri. Following his first wife's death, Brown married Mary Yoder of Spencer County, Kentucky, in 1835. Brown and his second wife had six additional children: John Mason Brown, Margaretta M. (Brown) Barrett, Mary Yoder (Brown) Scott, Yoder Brown, Knox Brown, and Eliza (Brown) Baily.

Brown and Morehead compiled A Digest of the Statute Laws of Kentucky, also known as Morehead and Brown's Digest, in 1834. In 1839, Brown was appointed to the bench of the Circuit Court of his District, and he served in that capacity until resigning in 1849 to return to his law practice. Morehead was elected governor of Kentucky in 1855 and appointed Brown as his Secretary of State. Both men's terms expired in 1859.

Brown died on January 27, 1867, in Frankfort and was buried in Frankfort Cemetery, which he had helped establish in 1844.

This article incorporates public domain material from the Yale Obituary Record.

Political offices
Preceded by Grant Green	Secretary of State of Kentucky; 1855–1859	Succeeded by Thomas B. Monroe Jr.
Preceded by James H. Garrard	Treasurer of Kentucky; 1865–1867	Succeeded by James W. Tate
