= Cola Barr Craig =

American author, clubwoman, and anti-suffragist (1861–1930)

President General, United Daughters of the Confederacy
- In office 1917–1919
- Succeeded by: May Faris McKinney

Personal details
- Born: Cola Amanda Barr; March 17, 1861 Jackson, Hinds County, Mississippi, U.S.
- Died: January 20, 1930 (aged 68) Selma, Alabama, U.S.
- Spouse: Benjamin H. Craig (m. 1885–1930)
- Children: 2
- Parent(s): Col. James Barr; Frances (Donnell) Barr
- Relatives: Marshall Jewell (uncle)
- Education: Fair Lawn Institute
- Occupation: Author, clubwoman

Cola Barr Craig (née, Barr; pen name, Benjamin H. Craig; March 17, 1861 – January 20, 1930) was an author of the American South who wrote short stories and a novel. Also a clubwoman, she served as president of several organizations including the United Daughters of the Confederacy (U.D.C.), the Memorial Association of Selma, Alabama, and United Charities of Selma.

== Early life and education ==
Cola Amanda Barr was born March 17, 1861, at Jackson, Hinds County, Mississippi.

She was educated at Fair Lawn Institute, Jackson, Mississippi, graduating in 1879.

== Lineage ==
She was the daughter of Col. James and Frances (Donnell) Barr, the former a native of New York state, who early in life moved with his parents to Jackson, Mississippi, and during the American Civil War, served in Confederate States Army, as colonel of the 10th Mississippi Infantry Regiment and was killed at Kennesaw Mountain.

She was the granddaughter of James and Margaret (Smith) Barr, of Patchogue, New York, and of William H. and Susan (Benthal) Donnell, natives of Wilson County, Tennessee, who resided at Jackson, Mississippi, for many years.

Craig was a descendent of Capt. John Donnell, of Mecklenburg County, North Carolina, known as the fighting parson during colonial times, and of John Benthal, a private in the Continental Army during the American Revolutionary War. Cola's siblings were: Georgia, Samuel and James.

== Career ==
Craig served as president of several organizations, including the United Daughters of the Confederacy (U.D.C.), the Memorial Association of Selma, Alabama, and United Charities of Selma. She also held the position of vice-president of the Anti-Suffrage association of the U.D.C. Alongside Mrs. James S. Pinckard, Craig attempted to co-organize a branch of the Southern Women's Rejection League, but the effort was unsuccessful.

During World War I, Craig was the county chair for the State Council of Defense and chaired the Dallas County committee on food conservation and production. She played a key role in the establishment of the first hospital in Selma, which was owned by United Charities. Craig was a member of the Ossian Club, a literary organization, and served as secretary-treasurer of the "Scribblers," the first organized writers' club in Alabama.

She was a Presbyterian and Democrat.

Craig authored the novel Was She and an unpublished work titled The Contrast, along with numerous short stories and poems.

== Personal life ==
On June 3, 1885, in Dallas County, Alabama, she married Benjamin H. Craig. They had a son, Benjamin H. Jr. and a daughter, Cola Barr.

Cola Barr Craig made her home in Selma, Alabama, where she died January 20, 1930.

== Selected works ==
- Was She: A Novel (1906)
