= Stephen T. Logan =

American lawyer and politician (1800–1880)

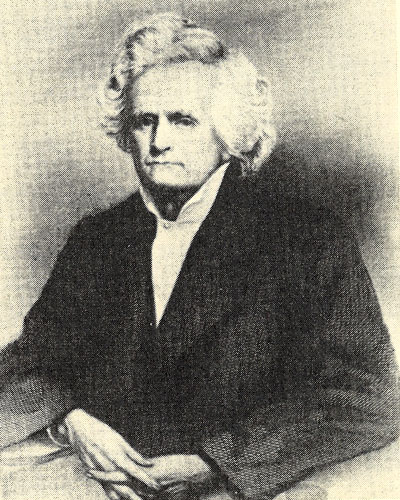
- Born: Stephen Trigg Logan; February 24, 1800; Franklin County, Kentucky, US
- Died: July 17, 1880 (aged 80); Springfield, Illinois, US
- Occupations: Lawyer, politician
- Known for: practiced law with Abraham Lincoln (1841–1843)
- Children: David, Sally
- Relatives: Grandfathers: Stephen Trigg, John Logan

Stephen Trigg Logan (February 24, 1800 – July 17, 1880) was an American lawyer and politician.

== Biography ==
Stephen T. Logan was born in Franklin County, Kentucky on February 24, 1800. He practiced law with Abraham Lincoln from 1841 to 1843. He served as Illinois circuit court judge and in 1847 was elected to the Illinois Constitutional Convention. He also served in the Illinois House of Representatives. Logan's son, David was a politician in Oregon, serving as mayor of Portland. Stephen Trigg Logan was a close friend and associate of Illinois industrialists and financiers Jacob Bunn and John Whitfield Bunn, who, at Logan's suggestion, helped Logan and others fund the 1860 presidential campaign of Abraham Lincoln.

His maternal grandfather was American pioneer Stephen Trigg and his paternal grandfather was John Logan, who was elected the first treasurer of the state of Kentucky.

His daughter Sally was the second wife of Ward Hill Lamon, another former Lincoln law partner who later served as his primary bodyguard during the Civil War.

Logan died in Springfield, Illinois on July 17, 1880.
