= John Arnold (Kentucky politician) =

American politician

Member of the Kentucky House of Representatives from the 7th district
- In office January 1, 1995 – September 13, 2013
- Preceded by: Sam McElroy
- Succeeded by: Suzanne Miles

Personal details
- Born: August 23, 1944
- Died: July 25, 2021 (aged 76)
- Party: Democratic

John Alloway Arnold Jr. (August 23, 1944 – July 25, 2021) was an American politician from Kentucky who was a member of the Kentucky House of Representatives from 1995 to 2013.

== Biography ==
Arnold was first elected in 1994 after incumbent representative Sam McElroy retired. Prior to his election he was a chiropractor, mayor of Sturgis, and member of the Sturgis city council. He resigned from the house in September 2013 amid allegations that he had sexually harassed legislative staffers. He was replaced in the house by Republican Suzanne Miles.

Arnold died on July 25, 2021.
