= Honest Dick Tate =

American politician and criminal (born 1831)

James W. "Honest Dick" Tate
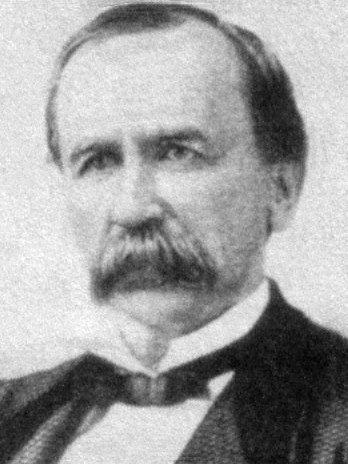

9th Kentucky State Treasurer
- In office 1867–1888
- Preceded by: Mason Brown
- Succeeded by: Stephen G. Sharpe

Kentucky Assistant Secretary of State
- In office 1854–1855

Kentucky Assistant Secretary of State
- In office 1859–1863

Assistant Clerk of the Kentucky House of Representatives
- In office 1865–1867

Personal details
- Born: January 2, 1831 Franklin County, Kentucky
- Died: Unknown, possibly 1890 possibly China
- Party: Democratic
- Spouse: Lucy J. Hawkins-Tate
- Profession: Post office clerk

James William "Honest Dick" Tate (January 2, 1831 – unknown (after 1890?)) was the Kentucky State Treasurer. He was nicknamed "Honest Dick" because of his good reputation and rapport with his colleagues. The nickname turned ironic, however, when Tate absconded with nearly a quarter of a million dollars from the state's treasury in 1888. He was never found.

Tate's thievery was frequently cited during Kentucky's fourth constitutional convention as a reason to impose term limits on Kentucky's elected officials. The one-term limit remained in force on most of Kentucky's officials until the state's constitution was amended in 1992 to allow the governor, lieutenant governor, state treasurer and other state officeholders to serve two consecutive terms.

== Early life ==
James William Tate was born the only child of Nancy (Taylor) Tate and her second husband, Colonel Thomas L. Tate in Franklin County, Kentucky. His father was descended from a Virginia family of Scots-Irish ancestry and was a farmer and veteran of the War of 1812; his paternal grandfather was a veteran of the American Revolutionary War. His maternal grandfather was Reverend John Taylor, a pioneer Baptist minister in Kentucky.

Tate received his education in Franklin and Woodford counties and finished his schooling in 1848. Later that year, at age 17, Tate began work as a clerk at the Frankfort post office. On June 3, 1856, he married Lucy J. Hawkins. On June 28, 1858, the couple had their first child, a son named Howard, who died at the age of three. The couple also had a daughter, Edmonia.

== Political career ==
Tate's political career began with an appointment by Governor Lazarus W. Powell to the position of Assistant Secretary of State for the state of Kentucky in 1854. A model Democrat, he resigned the post when Know-Nothing governor Charles S. Morehead was elected in 1855. Four years later, he was appointed to the post again under Democratic governor Beriah Magoffin, and supported the Breckinridge wing of Kentucky's Democratic party during the American Civil War. Though Magoffin resigned in 1862 due to disagreements with the General Assembly, Tate continued to serve under Magoffin's hand-picked successor, James F. Robinson, resigning again at the end of Robinson's term in 1863. From 1865 to 1867, Tate served as Assistant Clerk to the Kentucky House of Representatives. At the end of his service in the house, Tate successfully ran for state treasurer, a post to which he would be re-elected every two years for the next two decades.

In 1878, Tate was mentioned in the Biographical Encyclopedia of Kentucky. The biographer gushed that in 1867, Tate had "materially contributed, by his personal popularity, to the great success of the Democratic party" adding:

Biennially, since that time, without opposition in his own party, he has been successively re-elected by popular majorities, perhaps exceeding those obtained by any other candidate for office in the State. From these evidences of popularity, it would seem that his lease on the office might be regarded as a fixed fact.

In the gubernatorial race of 1887, Republican challenger William O. Bradley made an issue of the need to examine the treasury. Though Bradley ultimately lost the race, the idea of auditing the treasurer's records took root, and the General Assembly began calling for a commission to undertake the audit in the 1887–8 session. Tate claimed to need time to get his books in order; this effectively delayed the establishment of the commission, but it was ultimately formed.

== Disappearance and aftermath ==
In the first quarter of 1888, Tate began a pattern of behavior that would have aroused considerable suspicion in a man of lesser repute. He began depositing only checks in the state's bank account, instead of cash, as was usual. In a short time, he paid a number of personal debts. On March 14, 1888, Henry Murray, one of Tate's clerks, noticed him filling two tobacco sacks with gold and silver coins later determined to be worth about $100,000 (equivalent to $2.8 million in 2019). He departed for Louisville, leaving a note saying he would return in two days. Again, due to the nature of his job and his perceived record of trustworthiness, nobody questioned his actions. After a week passed with no word from the treasurer, it became clear what had happened: after a few days in Louisville, Tate boarded a train for Cincinnati, and then vanished, leaving his wife and daughter behind.

During the investigation that followed, the state's ledger, which was almost indecipherable, was found to show Tate giving some state officials loans and advances that were often left unpaid, including an advance of several thousand dollars to Governor Preston H. Leslie in 1872. Tate had apparently used some of the state's money to make personal investments in mines and real estate. Governor Simon B. Buckner announced that between his atrocious bookkeeping, his embezzlement and his outright theft, Tate had misappropriated $247,128.50 ($7 million in 2019) from the state treasury.

Impeachment hearings followed in Kentucky's House of Representatives, and the Senate removed Tate from office after an impeachment trial, convicting him on four counts on March 30. A criminal indictment followed. An 1895 case marked "Not to be officially reported" freed those implicated in the scandal from any obligation to repay the state. "Tateism" became synonymous with political corruption in the state, and Tate's crime was frequently cited at the state's fourth constitutional convention in 1891. The resulting constitution expanded the one-term limit that had applied to the governor since 1800 to all statewide elected officials. The legislature and voters adopted a two-term limit for such officials in 1992.

Despite the General Assembly's offer of $5,000 ($140,000 in 2019) for information leading to Tate's arrest, he was never found. Though his family at first claimed they had heard nothing from him and presumed he may have committed suicide, his daughter eventually admitted that she had received at least four letters from her father between April and December 1888. The letters were postmarked from British Columbia (Canada), Japan, China, and San Francisco. Another witness claimed to have seen a letter to one of Tate's friends written in 1890 and postmarked from Brazil. That was the last known communication from "Honest Dick" Tate. An article in The New York Times, citing "friends who should know", claimed that Tate was believed to have died in China in 1890.

== See also ==
- Edward A. Burke – a Louisiana state Treasurer who also fled the country once his fraud was discovered.
- List of people who disappeared
- List of unsolved deaths

Political offices
Preceded by Mason Brown	Treasurer of Kentucky; 1867–1888	Succeeded by Stephen G. Sharpe
