= Alexander Allen Faris =

American physician (1840–1905)

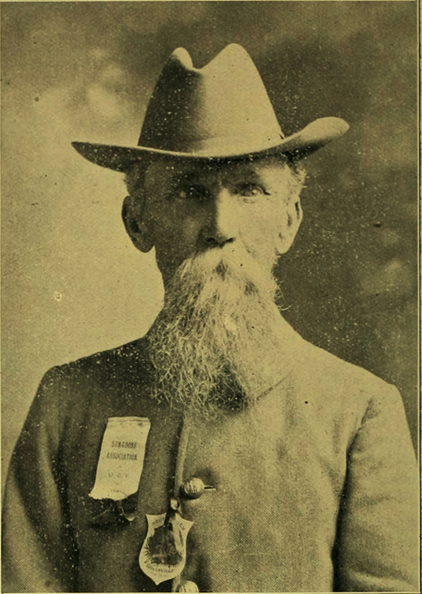
Dr. Alexander Allen Faris

Alexander Allen Faris (1840–1905) was an American physician. Though he had lost an arm in the civil war, he developed a very high degree of skill as a surgeon.

== Early life ==
Alexander Allen Faris was born March 1, 1840, on his father's plantation in Mississippi County, Missouri, opposite Hickman, Kentucky. His father, Richard Alexander Faris, was a native of North Carolina and spent his active life as a planter in Mississippi County, Missouri. Richard's wife was Ethelinda Harris. Ethelinda's father, Samuel Harris, was a member of the Rowan County, North Carolina Committee of Safety during the Revolutionary war.

== American Civil War ==
Early in the spring of 1861, Faris enlisted in Company L of the 5th Tennessee Infantry Regiment of Strahl's Brigade, Cheatham's Division, Hardee's Corps, Army of the Tennessee. On October 8, 1862, at the Battle of Perryville, Kentucky, in the forefront of battle and on the hottest part of the fighting line, he lost his right arm and was captured by the enemy. In February 1863, the Federal authorities, supposing him to be of no further efficiency as a soldier, gave him an exchange. His spirit of service was not to be daunted, and he hastened to Valdosta, Georgia, where he rejoined his command, reporting to Gen. Frank Cheatham for duty as a one-armed Confederate soldier. Cheatham made him one of his special couriers, and with the exception of the Battle of Missionary Ridge , when Faris was off on special duty, he was with his command in every engagement in which it participated from that time to the close of the civil war.

== Medical school ==
After the war, he took up the study of medicine, and by his study, acquired three diplomas. He graduated at the Nashville (Tenn.) Medical College in 1868; took a postgraduate course at Tulane Medical College, New Orleans, in 1869; graduated from the Bellevue Hospital' Medical College (now New York University Grossman School of Medicine, New York City, in 1871; and, taking a special course at the Jefferson Medical College (now Thomas Jefferson University, Philadelphia, in 1876.

== Career ==
After completing his studies, Faris returned to New York, where he remained nearly a year attending clinics at the various medical institutions of that city. From 1872, he was a member of the American Medical Association.

In 1878, when his home town was afflicted by yellow fever, he remained with his people throughout the epidemic. He alone of the five resident physicians lived through it, the four other volunteer physicians died.

Despite losing an arm during the Civil War, he developed considerable skill as a surgeon and achieved notable distinction in the field during his era, at a time when few with such a disability did so. He practiced for nearly 40 years in Hickman, Kentucky, where he was regarded as a valued member of the medical profession.

== Personal life ==
On May 18, 1871, Faris married Florence Goalder on the Stonewall farm near Lexington, Missouri. Their daughter, May Mourning Farris McKinney, served as President General of the United Daughters of the Confederacy.

He was an ardent democrat and served as a vestryman of St. Paul's Episcopal Church in Hickman.

Alexander Allen Faris died at his residence, Maple Hall, in Hickman, May 12, 1905.

After being widowed, Mrs. Faris continued to live at Maple Hall. Her father, James Thomas Goalder, born in Green County, Kentucky, in 1809, was a lawyer by profession, and died in Washington County, Kentucky, in 1860. His wife was Sarah Wilson, whose father, Gen. Samuel Wilson, served from Monroe County, Kentucky, in the War of 1812. Sarah Wilson's mother was Elizabeth Hughlett, daughter of Capt. William Thrift Hughlett, who served under Gen. Martin Armstrong in North Carolina in the American Revolutionary War.
