= Suzanne Miles =

American politician

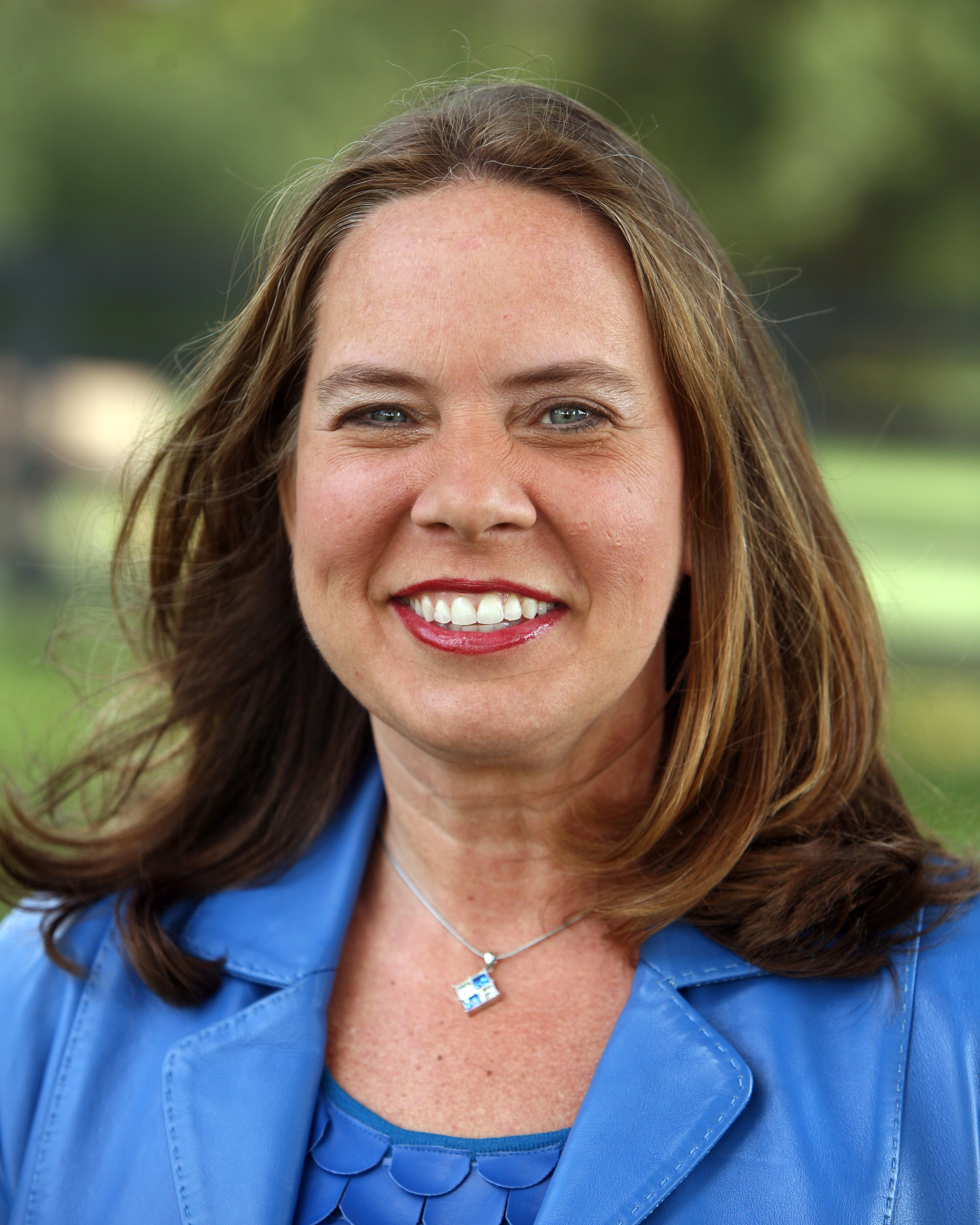
- Official portrait, 2013

Majority Caucus Chair of the Kentucky House of Representatives
- Incumbent
- Assumed office January 8, 2019
- Preceded by: David Meade

Member of the Kentucky House of Representatives from the 7th district
- Incumbent
- Assumed office January 7, 2014
- Preceded by: John Arnold

Personal details
- Born: November 18, 1970 (age 55) Owensboro, Kentucky, U.S.
- Party: Republican
- Education: Transylvania University
- Committees: Committee on Committees; Natural Resources and Energy; Rules

Vera Suzanne Miles (born November 18, 1970) is an American politician who has served as a Republican member of the Kentucky House of Representatives since January 2014. She represents Kentucky's 7th House district, which includes Daviess, Henderson, and Union counties. She serves as the House's Majority Caucus Chair, and is the first woman in Kentucky to serve as both an acting floor leader and an acting speaker of the chamber.

== Early life and education ==
Miles was born on November 18, 1970, in Owensboro, Kentucky. Her father, Billy Joe Miles, was a prominent farmer and businessman who served on the University of Kentucky's Board of Trustees from 1995 to 2013.

She graduated from Apollo High School in 1988, and continued her education at Transylvania University. During her senior year at Transylvania, Miles became a small business owner when she purchased a clothing store in Owensboro. After graduating from Transylvania in 1992, Miles began working at Town and Countrywear Ladies Clothing and Accessories, which she owned and operated until 2008.

Miles continues to live in Owensboro, and in 2009 began serving as a field representative for U.S. Representative Brett Guthrie of Kentucky's 2nd congressional district.

== Political career ==
=== 2013 Special Election ===
In September 2013, Kentucky's 7th House district incumbent John Arnold resigned following allegations that he had sexually harassed legislative staffers. To fill the vacancy, Governor Steve Beshear called for a special election to be held on December 10, 2013.

Miles was selected as the Republican nominee and won the 2013 Kentucky House of Representatives special election with 3,548 votes (50.8%) against Democratic candidate Kim Humphrey.

Upon her election, Miles became the 46th Republican in the Kentucky House, the highest strength the party had held in the chamber since 1921.

=== Majority Caucus Chair ===
In 2018, Miles was elected House Majority Caucus Chair and became the first woman to serve in Kentucky House Republican leadership. She was reelected to the position in 2020, 2022, and 2024.

=== Other elections ===
- 2014 Miles was unopposed in the 2014 republican primary, and won the 2014 Kentucky House of Representatives election with 8,343 (53.5%) votes against Democratic candidate John Warren.
- 2016 Miles was unopposed in the 2016 republican primary, and won the 2016 Kentucky House of Representatives election with 13,189 (63%) votes against Democratic candidate Joy Gray.
- 2018 Miles was unopposed in the 2018 republican primary, and won the 2018 Kentucky House of Representatives election with 10,723 (61.5%) votes against Democratic candidate Joy Gray.
- 2020 Miles was unopposed in both the 2020 republican primary and 2020 Kentucky House of Representatives election, winning the latter with 18,847 votes.
- 2022 Miles was unopposed in both the 2022 republican primary and 2022 Kentucky House of Representatives election, winning the latter with 11,211 votes.
- 2024 Miles was unopposed in the 2024 republican primary and 2024 Kentucky House of Representatives election, winning the latter with 16,678 votes.
