= Winston Jones Davie =

American politician

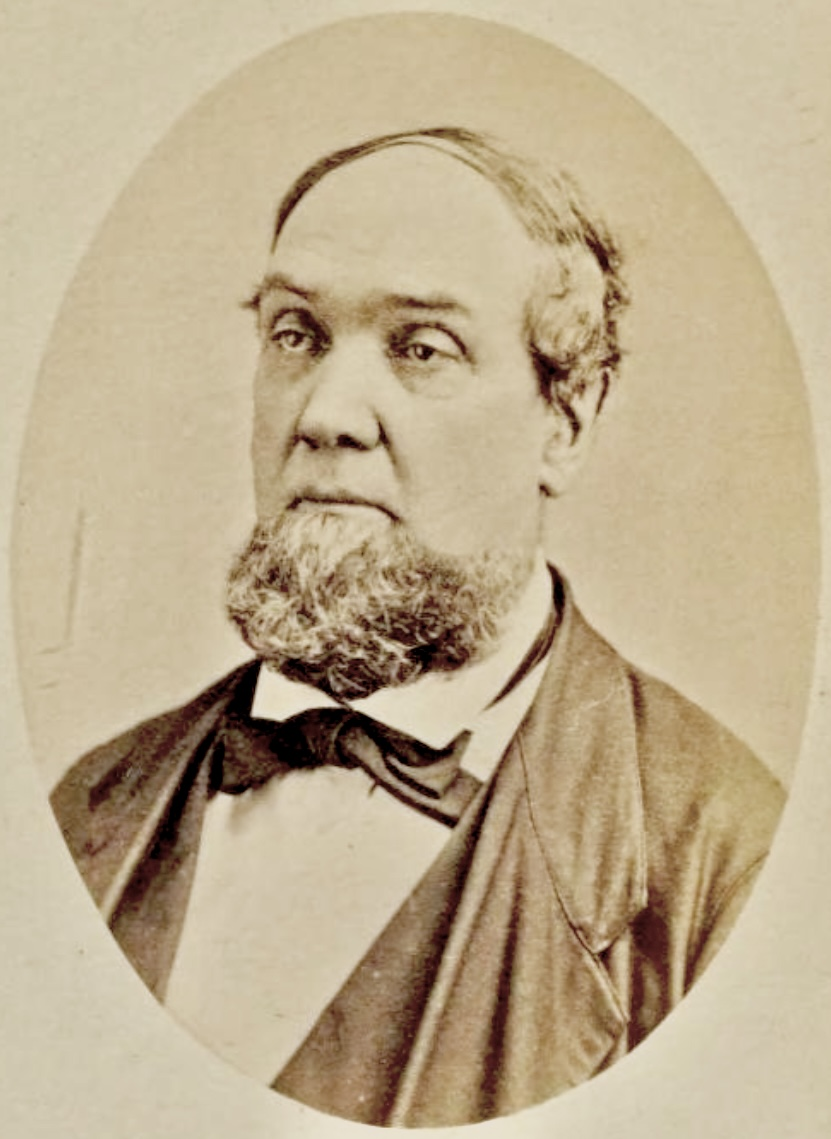
- Davie, c. 1881

1st Kentucky Commissioner of Agriculture
- In office 1876–1879
- Governor: James B. McCreary
- Preceded by: Office established
- Succeeded by: Charles W. Bowman

Personal details
- Born: April 3, 1824 Christian County, Kentucky
- Died: May 24, 1887 (aged 63) Hopkinsville, Kentucky
- Party: Democratic
- Education: Yale University

Winston Jones Davie (April 3, 1824 – May 24, 1887) was a Kentucky politician and the first Kentucky Commissioner of Agriculture.

== Early life and education ==
Davie, elder son of Ambrose and Elizabeth Ann (Woodson) Davie, was born April 3, 1824, in Christian County, Kentucky, where his father was an extensive planter. He graduated from Yale College in 1845. After graduation he became a cotton and tobacco planter in his native State.

== Career ==
He was elected to the Kentucky General Assembly in 1849 as a Democrat, and in 1853 was a candidate for US Congress, and lost the election by only a few votes. For most of the time between the latter date and the outbreak of the American Civil War he was engaged as a banker and real estate dealer in Memphis, Tenn. He acted with the South during the war, and by the results of that contest lost all his property. From 1865 until 1876 he resided near Hopkinsville, in his native county. From 1876 to 1879 he was State Commissioner of Agriculture. Later he resided in Louisville, engaged in the manufacture of chemical fertilizers.

== Personal life ==
He was married, August 7, 1845, to Sarah Ann, daughter of Gen. Charles Philips, of Harris County, Ga., who died June 2, 1859, leaving two sons, who both graduated from the College of New Jersey. He was again married, February 14, 1861, to Addie E, daughter of Jacob W. Kalfus, of Louisville, Ky., by whom he had one son.

== Death ==
He died in Hopkinsville, May 24, 1887, in his 64th year.

This article incorporates public domain material from the 1887 Yale Obituary Record.
