= May Faris McKinney =

American non-profit leader (1874–1959)

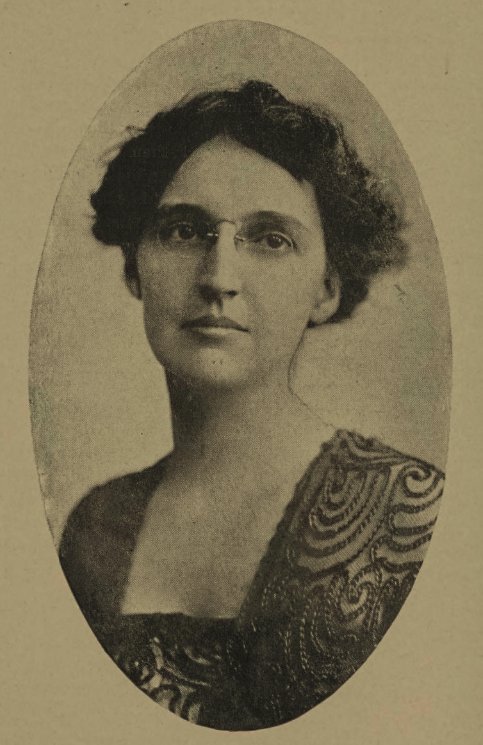
- McKinney circa 1920

President General of the United Daughters of the Confederacy
- In office 1919–1921
- Preceded by: Cola Barr Craig
- Succeeded by: Leonora St. George Rogers Schuyler

Personal details
- Born: May Mourning Faris; June 23, 1874 Hickman, Kentucky, U.S.
- Died: December 22, 1959 (aged 85) Paducah, Kentucky, U.S.
- Resting place: Mount Kenton Cemetery
- Spouse: Roy Weaks McKinney
- Children: 2
- Parent: Dr. Alexander Allen Faris (father)
- Occupation: Non-profit executive

May Faris McKinney (née Faris; after marriage, Mrs. Roy Weaks McKinney; nickname, "May-Roy"; 1874–1959) was an American clubwoman and non-profit executive. She was the first Kentucky woman to serve as President General of the United Daughters of the Confederacy (UDC), an honor conferred upon her on November 13, 1919, at the national convention at Tampa, Florida. Previously, McKinney was elected Recording Secretary-General at Little Rock, Arkansas in 1910, serving three terms. From October 1905 to October 1907, McKinney was President of the Kentucky Division of the UDC. She was at one time Regent of the Fort Jefferson Chapter of the Daughters of the American Revolution (DAR), and she served as president of the Paducah Woman's Club for two terms. During World War I, McKinney was prominently identified with Liberty loan sales and other war activities.

== Early life and education ==
May Mourning Faris was born at the home of her parents, Maple Hall, in Hickman, Kentucky, on June 23, 1874. May's father, Dr. Alexander Allen Faris, lost an arm in the civil war, but nevertheless developed a very high degree of skill as a surgeon, and was one of the few men thus handicapped who achieved distinction in that branch of the profession in his era. May's mother was Florence (Goalder) Faris. A member of the UDC, she was a charter member and officer of the chapter at Hickman. May had four siblings: four siblings, Light, Irene, Evan, and Allen.

McKinney's grandfather, Richard Alexander Faris, was a native of North Carolina and spent his active life as a planter in Mississippi County, Missouri. His wife was Ethelinda Harris. Ethelinda's father, Samuel Harris, was a member of the Rowan County, North Carolina Committee of Safety during the Revolutionary war.

McKinney was educated by private tutors to the age of twelve, after which she attended Mrs. M. E. Clark's Select School for Young Ladies at Nashville, Tennessee, graduating in 1892, and later taking two years of college work. An unusual side to her training was that obtained from close association with her father in the practice of his profession, when very frequently, in time of emergency, she assisted him with surgical operations.

She afterwards "entered into society", and church and other activities, and was prominent in Hickman social circles for several years.

== Career ==
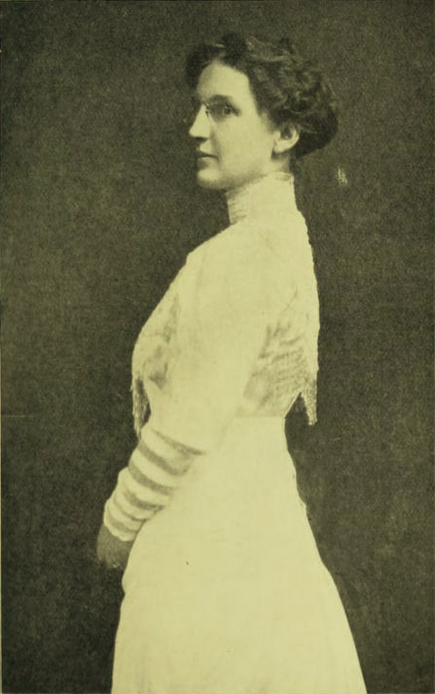
McKinney circa 1910

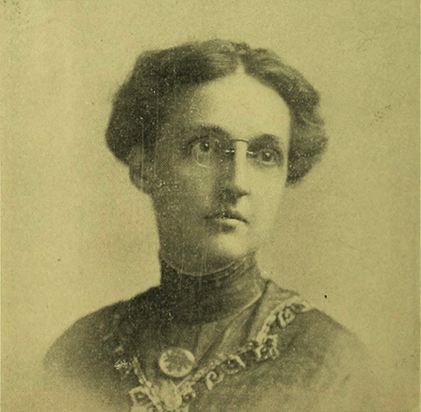
McKinney circa 1911

In the UDC, McKinney's efforts over time brought her increasing prominence. In 1909, she joined Paducah Chapter, and for two years, she served as its president. For two years, she was president of the Kentucky chapter; two years, chair of the General History Committee; two years, chair of the General Finance Committee; ten years, treasurer of the Shiloh Monument Committee; and three years, chair of the committee to provide a monument to Jefferson Davis at his Kentucky birthplace.For three years, she served as Recording Secretary-General. An interesting incident in her career as Recording Secretary-General happened at Washington, D.C. when McKinney locked up in a room some newspaper reporters until they agreed to omit from their stories of the convention certain remarks made on the floor by members, but that were not typical of the best in the UDC. On the score of her work in these various offices, McKinney was placed in nomination and elected President General of the UDC at Tampa, Florida, on November 19, 1919. By 1946, she was serving as Executive Editor of the United Daughters of the Confederacy Magazine, published monthly by the UDC from Paducah, Kentucky.

She was a member and president for two years of the Paducah Woman's Club; a member of the River Raisin Chapter at Lexington of the National Society of United States Daughters of 1812; and Chaperon of Forrest's Cavalry Corps. McKinney was a member of the DAR; for two years, she served as Regent of the Fort Jefferson Chapter of the DAR.

During World War I, McKinney was chair of sales of the Woman's Division in McCracken County for all the loan campaigns; chair of War Savings Stamp sales for the county districts of McCracken County; recording secretary of the Woman's Division of McCracken County's Council of National Defense; member of the Speaker's Bureau, of the Home Service Department of the McCracken County Red Cross; and chair of the UDC Red Cross Unit.

== Personal life ==
On November 26, 1901, in St. Paul's Episcopal Church at Hickman, she married Roy Weaks McKinney. They had two children, Elizabeth and Roy, who died in infancy.

Roy Weaks McKinney was born in Caldwell County, Kentucky, May 3, 1875, a son of James W. McKinney, who was president of the Cadiz Bank in Trigg County, Kentucky, where for many years he was a prominent democrat and at one time, represented the county in the Kentucky General Assembly. James W. McKinney married Elizabeth Weaks, who was born at Tobaccoport, Stewart County, Tennessee, in 1855, and died in Trigg County in 1877. The McKinneys came from Scotland to North Carolina in Colonial times, the first of the family in the U.S. being Barnabas McKinney. His branch of the McKinneys were descended from Clan Macdonald of Sleat, and through them from the MacDonalds of the Isles and also the Sumerleds, a clan with high connections with the reigning house of Scotland in the year 900. Roy McKinney's maternal grandfather, E. P. Weaks, was a prominent business man in Paducah, Kentucky where he died when about eighty years of age. He was president of the firm Weaks Bros. & Company, wholesale grocers. E. P. Weaks married Mary Jane Acree, a descendant of James Brigham, a Revolutionary soldier from Sullivan County, Tennessee. James Brigham gave some of his property for the court house and other buildings in Sullivan County. Roy McKinney was a prominent Paducah businessman, being president of the McKinney-Guedry Company, and a vestry man of Grace Episcopal Church.

McKinney was confirmed by Bishop Thomas Underwood Dudley in St. Paul's Episcopal Church at Hickman, and for many years was identified with church activities. She became a member of Grace Episcopal Church at Paducah. For recreation, she enjoyed motoring.

May Faris McKinney moved to Paducah, Kentucky, after her marriage. She died at her home in this city on December 22, 1959. Interment was at Mount Kenton Cemetery.
