= Alben W. Barkley II =

American politician (1944–2023)

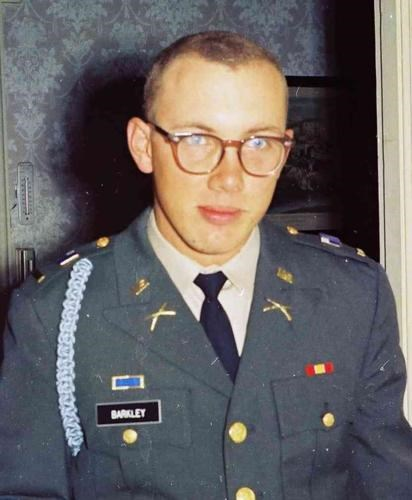
- Barkley, c. 1970

27th Kentucky Commissioner of Agriculture
- In office January 7, 1980 – January 2, 1984
- Governor: John Y. Brown, Jr.
- Preceded by: Thomas O. Harris
- Succeeded by: David Boswell

Personal details
- Born: Alben William Barkley II; September 15, 1944 Bexar, Texas, U.S.
- Died: January 30, 2023 (aged 78) Hanson, Kentucky, U.S.
- Resting place: Mount Kenton Cemetery
- Party: Democratic
- Spouse: Patricia Barkley
- Relations: Alben W. Barkley (grandfather)
- Education: Murray State University (BA)

Military service
- Allegiance: United States
- Branch/service: United States Army
- Years of service: 1969–1971
- Rank: Captain
- Unit: 1st Infantry Division
- Battles/wars: Vietnam War

Alben William Barkley II (September 15, 1944 – January 30, 2023) was an American politician who served as Kentucky Commissioner of Agriculture from 1980 to 1984. He also had a failed bid for Lieutenant Governor of Kentucky in 1983. He was a member of the Democratic Party.

== Early life ==
Alben William Barkley II was born in Bexar, Texas, on September 15, 1944, to David and Dorothy Barkley. He was the grandson of U.S. vice president, senator, and representative Alben W. Barkley. He received a public education, and attended Paducah Tilghman High School, where he was on the football and basketball teams. He graduated from Murray State University in 1967 with a Bachelor of Arts in English, history, and political science.

After graduating, Barkley joined the United States Army. In 1969, he was drafted to serve in the Vietnam War. He climbed to rank of captain in the 1st Infantry Division. He later served as a liaison officer to South Vietnam. He was military discharged in 1971.

== Career ==
After returning to the United States, Barkley moved to Marion, Kentucky, where he began a career in hunting and farming. In 1979, he ran for Agriculture Commissioner of Kentucky. He defeated Roy C. Gray Jr. in the general election on November 6, 1979. Barkley assumed office in 1980.

In 1981, Barkley was accused of sexually harassing his 25-year old secretary Ann Hester. Barkley reportedly asked Hester to be his lover, looked down her dress, and told her she looked "sexy." Barkley denied any wrong-doing.

In 1983, Barkley ran for Lieutenant Governor of Kentucky, but came in fourth in the primary behind Steve Beshear, George L. Atkins, and Todd Hollenbach.

== Death ==
At age 78, Barkley died on January 30, 2023, at the Western Kentucky Veterans Center, in Hanson, Kentucky. He was buried in the Barkley family plot at the Mount Kenton Cemetery in Paducah, Kentucky.
