= James H. Garrard =

American politician

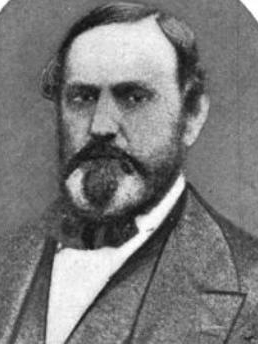

7th Kentucky State Treasurer
- In office 1857–1865
- Preceded by: Richard Curd Wintersmith
- Succeeded by: Mason Brown

Personal details
- Born: October 23, 1810
- Died: August 12, 1865 (aged 54)
- Relatives: James Garrard (grandfather)

James Henry Garrard (October 23, 1810 – August 12, 1865) was a Kentucky politician. Garrard, the grandson of Kentucky's second Governor, James Garrard, represented Clay, Letcher, and Perry Counties in the Kentucky Constitutional Convention. Garrard served as Kentucky State Treasurer from 1857 until his death in 1865.

== Personal life ==
Garrard was married to Letitia J. Garrard, and had 5 children, Toleman, Daniel, Maletda, James & Lucy Garrard Stell.

In 1859, Garrard purchased the Crittenden-Garrard House on Wilkinson Street in Frankfort, Kentucky with his wife Letitia. He died in 1865.

== Military service ==
Garrard served as a General for the Union Army in the American Civil War.

== Career ==
He was elected to the state legislature in 1836. In 1849, Garrard represented Clay, Letcher, and Perry Counties in the Kentucky Constitutional Convention.

In 1857, James H. Garrard was elected State Treasurer for the first time by a majority of more than 12,000 votes over Thomas L. Jones. He was subsequently re-elected and served three more two-year terms during the Civil War. In August 1865, he was re-elected for a fifth term but died just 12 days later before beginning the term.

Political offices
Preceded by Richard Curd Wintersmith	Treasurer of Kentucky; 1857–1865	Succeeded by Mason Brown
