= Mount Kenton Cemetery =

Cemetery in Kentucky, US

- Interactive map of Mount Kenton Cemetery

Details
- Established: 1857
- Location: McCracken County, Paducah, Kentucky
- Country: United States
- Coordinates: 37°02′37″N 88°39′31″W
- No. of graves: >6,000
- Website: Mt. Kenton Cemetery
- Find a Grave: Mount Kenton Cemetery
- Footnotes: GNIS 498761

Mount Kenton Cemetery is a small cemetery in the rural city of Paducah, Kentucky in the United States. It is located approximately four miles south of Paducah. The area of the cemetery was original deeded by Joseph Kenton to Charles A. Campbell, Hiram Hall, J.D. Brandberry, T.P. Reynolds, and a Church of the Old School Presbyterians for a church to be placed there.

== Notable burials ==
- Alben W. Barkley (1877–1956), 35th vice president of the United States under Harry S. Truman.
- May Mourning Farris McKinney (1874–1959), President General of the United Daughters of the Confederacy

== See also ==
- List of burial places of presidents and vice presidents of the United States
