= Frances Jones Mills =

American politician

33rd, 35th, & 37th Kentucky State Treasurer
- In office January 6, 1992 – January 1, 1996
- Preceded by: Robert Mead
- Succeeded by: John Kennedy Hamilton
- In office January 3, 1984 – January 4, 1988
- Preceded by: Drexell R. Davis
- Succeeded by: Robert Mead
- In office January 5, 1976 – January 7, 1980
- Preceded by: Drexell R. Davis
- Succeeded by: Drexell R. Davis

78th Secretary of State of Kentucky
- In office January 7, 1980 – January 3, 1984
- Preceded by: Drexell R. Davis
- Succeeded by: Drexell R. Davis

Clerk of the Kentucky Court of Appeals
- In office January 3, 1972 – January 5, 1976
- Preceded by: Dick Vermillion
- Succeeded by: Martha Layne Collins

Member of the Kentucky House of Representatives from the 87th district
- In office January 1, 1962 – January 1, 1964
- Preceded by: Buford Clark
- Succeeded by: Harry M. Hoe

Personal details
- Born: July 4, 1920 Gray, Kentucky
- Died: May 24, 1996 (aged 75) Louisville, Kentucky

Frances Jones Mills (July 4, 1920 – May 24, 1996) was an American politician who served in various state elective offices in Kentucky for a large portion of the 1970s and 1980s. The first woman and first Democrat in the 20th century to win election to the Kentucky General Assembly from her native Knox County, she later became the first woman to serve three (non-successive) terms as Kentucky State Treasurer. In an era when Kentucky's Constitution forbad elected statewide officeholders from serving consecutive terms, Mills also served as Secretary of State of Kentucky and Clerk of the Kentucky Court of Appeals.

== Early life and education ==
Born in Gray, a small town in far southeast Knox County, Kentucky, Frances was the daughter of Dr. William H. Jones and Bertie (Steely) Jones. She graduated from Cumberland College in Williamsburg in nearby Whitley County as well as attended Eastern Kentucky State Teacher's College in Madison County. She taught school in Gray for eight years before marrying and ultimately beginning her political career.

== Public office ==
Knox County voters elected Mills to the Kentucky House of Representatives in 1961, although a Democrat from a heavily Republican district. She served one term, then worked as an aide to the Speaker of the House.

In 1964, despite the nationwide Democratic landslide as Lyndon B. Johnson retained the presidency by a huge margin over Barry Goldwater, Mills became an unsuccessful candidate for the U.S. House of Representatives. She won the Democratic nomination but lost the general election to Republican Tim Lee Carter, who would later win re-election several times.

From 1965 to 1972 Mills worked for the Kentucky Civil Defense, leaving after winning her first statewide office (for Clerk of the Kentucky Court of Appeals) in November 1971. Mills later sought and won election to the office of State Treasurer in 1975, 1983, and 1991. She was also elected Secretary of State in 1979. Mills also twice unsuccessfully sought election as Secretary of State of Kentucky, losing to Bremer Ehrler in 1987, and to John Y. Brown III in 1995.

For 100 years (1891–1992) the Kentucky Constitution did not allow any holder of statewide office to succeed themselves for a second consecutive term. As a result, a handful of Kentucky politicians became known as musical chairs officeholders because they would run for one statewide office and then another repeatedly. Thelma Stovall, Drexell R. Davis and Mills were the best known of Kentucky's musical chairs officeholders, and traded offices in various election years through the 1970s and 1980s.

In 1984, Mills and six of her employees (in the Secretary of State's office) were indicted for violating state ethics laws in regards to her election as State Treasurer. Mills was acquitted after a two-year-long case. In the early 1990s she was again charged with violating ethics laws, convicted and fined $11,000. Because she filed an appeal and the case was still pending when he died of cancer, it was ultimately dismissed per custom.

== Personal life ==
She first married Marvin Wayne Bowling, but they divorced in the early 1940s). Mills married Gene Mills in 1949.

== Death ==
On May 24, 1996, Mills died of cancer in Louisville. She is buried in the Highland Cemetery in Williamsburg. Certain portraits and her gavel are held by the Knox County Historical Society.

== See also ==
- John Y. Brown, Jr.
- Martha Layne Collins
- Drexell R. Davis
- Thelma Stovall

Party political offices
Preceded by Drexell R. Davis	Democratic nominee for Kentucky State Treasurer; 1975	Succeeded by Drexell R. Davis
Preceded by Drexell R. Davis	Democratic nominee for Secretary of State of Kentucky; 1979	Succeeded by Drexell R. Davis
Preceded by Drexell R. Davis	Democratic nominee for Kentucky State Treasurer; 1983	Succeeded by Robert Mead
Preceded by Robert Mead	Democratic nominee for Kentucky State Treasurer; 1991	Succeeded by John Kennedy Hamilton
Legal offices
Preceded by Dick Vermillion	Clerk of the Kentucky Court of Appeals; 1972–1976	Succeeded by Martha Layne Collins
Political offices
Preceded by Drexell R. Davis	Kentucky State Treasurer; 1976–1980	Succeeded by Drexell R. Davis
Preceded by Drexell R. Davis	Kentucky Secretary of State; 1980–1984	Succeeded by Drexell R. Davis
Preceded by Drexell R. Davis	Kentucky State Treasurer; 1984–1988	Succeeded by Robert Mead
Preceded by Robert Mead	Kentucky State Treasurer; 1992–1996	Succeeded by John Kennedy Hamilton
