= Bremer Ehrler =

American politician

80th Secretary of State of Kentucky
- In office January 4, 1988 – January 6, 1992
- Governor: Wallace Wilkinson; Brereton Jones
- Preceded by: Drexell R. Davis
- Succeeded by: Bob Babbage

2nd Judge/Executive of Jefferson County
- In office January 3, 1985 – January 6, 1986
- Appointed by: Martha Layne Collins
- Preceded by: Mitch McConnell
- Succeeded by: Harvey I. Sloane

Personal details
- Born: July 10, 1914 Louisville, Kentucky, U.S.
- Died: February 9, 2013 (aged 98)
- Party: Democratic

Military service
- Branch/service: United States Army
- Years of service: 1942–1968
- Rank: Lieutenant Colonel
- Unit: United States Army Reserve

Bremer Ehrler (July 10, 1914 – February 9, 2013) was an American politician who served as Jefferson County Judge/ Executive and the 80th Secretary of State of Kentucky.

== Early life and education ==
Ehrler was born in Louisville, Kentucky. As a child, he worked on his family's dairy farm. He graduated from DuPont Manual High School in 1931.

== Career ==
Ehrler joined the United States Army in 1942 and served until 1968, retiring as a lieutenant colonel. Ehrler worked for the United States Postal Service for 37 years, and served as postmaster of Louisville, Kentucky during the 1960s.

Ehrler was appointed Jefferson County Judge/Executive by Governor Martha Layne Collins on December 21, 1984, to fill the vacancy left by Mitch McConnell after McConnell's election to the United States Senate. Ehrler served in that post until January 6, 1986. He did not seek election to a second term, opting instead to run for secretary of state in 1987, the year after he left office. He would serve as Kentucky Secretary of State from 1988 until the end of his term in 1992.

He later was appointed Jefferson County sheriff in 1993.

Party political offices
Preceded by Drexell R. Davis	Democratic nominee for Secretary of State of Kentucky; 1987	Succeeded by Bob Babbage
Legal offices
Preceded by Mitch McConnell	Jefferson County Judge/Executive (Kentucky); December 21, 1984–January 6, 1986	Succeeded by Harvey I. Sloane
Political offices
Preceded by Drexell R. Davis	Kentucky Secretary of State; 1988–1992	Succeeded by Bob Babbage
