= Kentucky State Treasurer =

Elected chief fiscal officer of Kentucky

State Treasurer of Kentucky
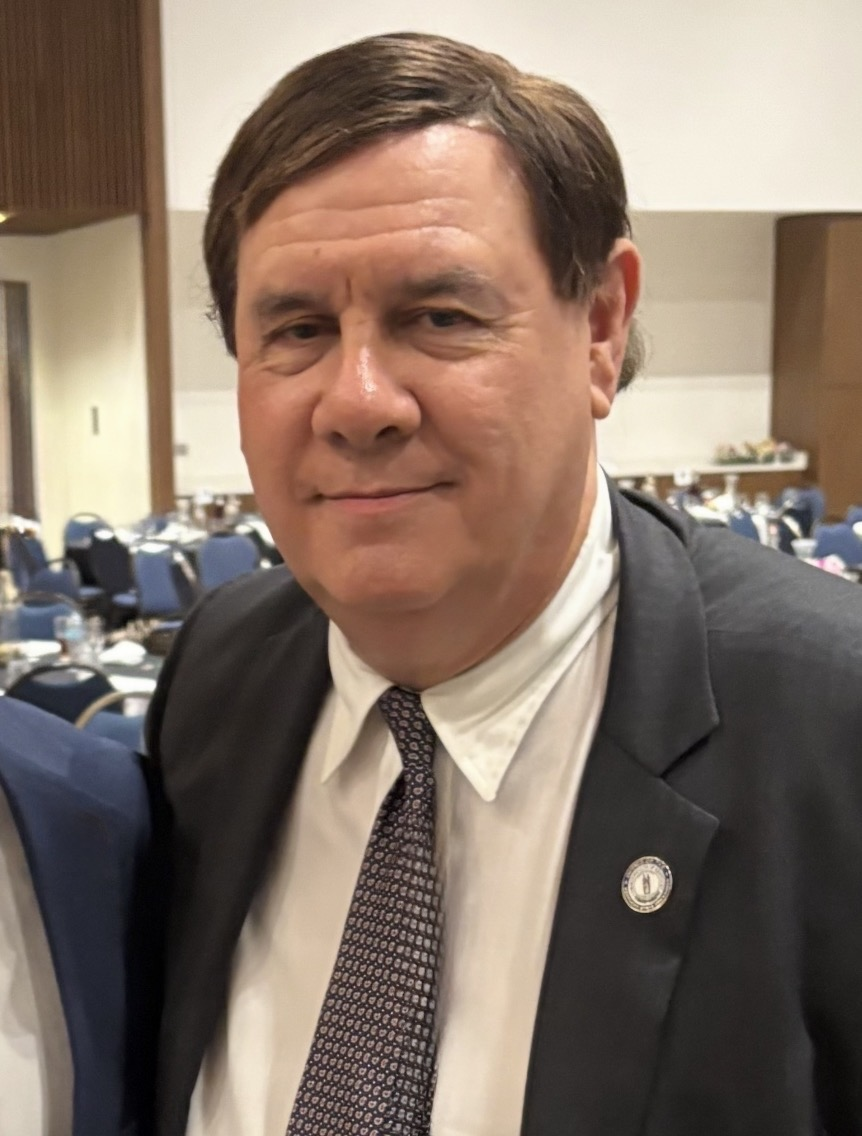
- Incumbent; Mark Metcalf since January 1, 2024
- Type: State's chief elected fiscal officer
- Term length: 4 years, renewable once
- Formation: 1792
- First holder: John Logan
- Salary: $152,551.00
- Website: Kentucky State Treasurer website

The Kentucky State Treasurer is elected every four years along with the governor and other statewide officials. The treasurer, who can serve two terms, acts as the state's chief elected fiscal officer. The salary is $152,551.00 a year.

The current treasurer, Mark Metcalf of Lancaster, is the second Republican elected to the post since 1944. He succeeded the term-limited Republican Allison Ball of Prestonsburg, who was elected Kentucky Auditor of Public Accounts.

The treasurer's duties include:

- Act as head of the treasury KRS 041.020
- Create and manage the state's depository KRS 041-070
- Make record of all monies due and payable to the state KRS 041-100
- Process warrants from the Finance and Administration Cabinet KRS 041-150
- Make payments on behalf of the state KRS 041-160
- Make an annual report KRS 041-340

== List of Kentucky State Treasurers ==
#	Image	Name	Political Party	Term
1		John Logan		1792–1807
2		David Logan		1807–1808
3		John Pendelton Thomas		1808–1818
4		Samuel South		1818–1824
5		James Davidson		1824–1849
6		Richard Curd Wintersmith		1849–1857
7		James H. Garrard	Democratic	1857–1865
8		Mason Brown	Democratic	1865–1867
9		James W. Tate	Democratic	1867–1888
10		Stephen G. Sharpe	Democratic	1888–1890
11		Henry S. Hale	Democratic	1890–1895
12		George W. Long	Republican	1896–1900
13		Walter R. Day	Republican	1900
14		Samuel Wilber Hager	Democratic	1900–1904
15		Henry M. Bosworth	Democratic	1904–1908
16		Edwin Farley	Republican	1908–1912
17		Thomas S. Rhea	Democratic	1912–1916
18		Sherman Goodpaster	Democratic	1916–1920
19		James A. Wallace	Republican	1920–1924
20		Edward Blan Dishman	Democratic	1924–1928
21		Emma Guy Cromwell	Democratic	1928–1932
22		Elam Huddleston	Democratic	1932–1936
23		John E. Buckingham		1936–1940
24		Ernest E. Shannon	Democratic	1940–1944
25		Thomas W. Vinson	Republican	1944–1948
26		Edward F. Seiller	Democratic	1948–1949
27		Pearl Frances Runyon	Democratic	1949–1956
28		Henry H. Carter	Democratic	1956–1960
29		Thelma Stovall	Democratic	1960–1964
30		Emerson "Doc" Beauchamp	Democratic	1964–1968
31		Thelma Stovall	Democratic	1968–1972
32		Drexell R. Davis	Democratic	1972–1976
33		Frances Jones Mills	Democratic	1976–1980
34		Drexell R. Davis	Democratic	1980–1984
35		Frances Jones Mills	Democratic	1984–1988
36		Robert Mead	Democratic	1988–1992
37		Frances Jones Mills	Democratic	1992–1996
38		John Kennedy Hamilton	Democratic	1996–1999
39		Jonathan Miller	Democratic	1999–2007
40		Todd Hollenbach	Democratic	2007–2016
41		Allison Ball	Republican	2016–2024
42		Mark Metcalf	Republican	2024–present
