= David Boswell (Kentucky politician) =

American politician

David E. Boswell

Member of the Kentucky Senate from the 8th district
- In office January 1, 1991 – January 1, 2011
- Preceded by: Delbert Murphy
- Succeeded by: Joseph R. Bowen

28th Kentucky Commissioner of Agriculture
- In office January 2, 1984 – January 4, 1988
- Governor: Martha Layne Collins; Wallace Wilkinson
- Preceded by: Alben W. Barkley II
- Succeeded by: Ward Burnette

Member of the Kentucky House of Representatives from the 7th district
- In office January 1, 1978 – January 2, 1984
- Preceded by: Joe McBride
- Succeeded by: Sam McElroy

Personal details
- Born: November 20, 1949 (age 76) Henderson, Kentucky
- Party: Democratic
- Spouse: Sandi
- Education: Eastern Kentucky University
- Occupation: Sales and marketing

David Erle Boswell (born November 20, 1949) is a former Democratic member of the Kentucky Senate, having represented the 8th District from 1990 to 2011. Earlier he was a member of the Kentucky House of Representatives from 1978 through 1983. In 1983, he defeated Republican Richard Turner to be elected Agriculture Commissioner of Kentucky with 64%. In 1987, he was a candidate for Lieutenant Governor unsuccessfully in the Democratic Primary on a ticket paired with Grady Stumbo. The Stumbo-Boswell ticket came in fourth. He returned the political arena and was the 2008 Democratic nominee for U.S. Representative for Kentucky's 2nd Congressional District, and lost to Republican nominee Brett Guthrie. The congressional seat became open because of the retirement of Republican Ron Lewis.

Boswell's 2008 campaign was endorsed by Democrats for Life of America. although the National Right to Life Committee (generally considered the flagship right-to-life organization in the United States) endorsed his opponent, Guthrie. While Boswell kept the race close by winning the more urbanized counties in this mostly rural district, he could not overcome the presence of John McCain and Mitch McConnell atop the ticket. McCain carried the district with 60 percent of the vote and won all but one county entirely within the district. McConnell also carried the 2nd easily.

Boswell lost his 2010 bid for State Senate re-election to Republican businessman Joseph R. Bowen, the owner of Bowen Tire Company in Owensboro.

== See also ==
- United States House of Representatives elections in Kentucky, 2008#District 2

Party political offices
Preceded by Alben W. Barkley II	Democratic nominee for Agriculture Commissioner of Kentucky; 1983	Succeeded by Ward Burnette
