= Drexell R. Davis =

American politician

- Davis, c. 1975

77th & 79th Secretary of State of Kentucky
- In office January 2, 1984 – January 4, 1988
- Governor: Martha Layne Collins; Wallace Wilkinson
- Preceded by: Frances Jones Mills
- Succeeded by: Bremer Ehrler
- In office January 5, 1976 – January 7, 1980
- Governor: Julian Carroll; John Y. Brown Jr.
- Preceded by: Thelma Stovall
- Succeeded by: Frances Jones Miller

32nd & 34th Kentucky State Treasurer
- In office January 7, 1980 – January 2, 1984
- Governor: John Y. Brown Jr. Martha Layne Collins
- Preceded by: Frances Jones Mills
- Succeeded by: Frances Jones Mills
- In office January 3, 1972 – January 5, 1976
- Governor: Wendell Ford; Julian Carroll
- Preceded by: Thelma Stovall
- Succeeded by: Frances Jones Mills

Clerk of the Kentucky Court of Appeals
- In office January 6, 1964 – January 1, 1968
- Preceded by: Doris Owens
- Succeeded by: Dick Vermillion

Personal details
- Born: July 21, 1921 Shelbyville, Kentucky
- Died: December 16, 2009 (aged 88) Frankfort, Kentucky

Drexell R. Davis (July 19, 1921 – December 16, 2009) was a Democrat who held several elected offices in Kentucky. He was born in Shelby County, Kentucky.

For 100 years (1891–1992) the Kentucky Constitution did not allow any holder of statewide office to succeed themselves for a second consecutive term. As a result, a handful of Kentucky politicians became known as "musical chairs" officeholders because they would run for one statewide office and then another repeatedly. Thelma Stovall, Frances Jones Mills and Drex Davis were the best known musical chairs officeholders. The three often traded offices in given election years through the 1970s and 1980s.

== Clerk of the Court of Appeals ==
Davis began his career in statewide elective office by winning election as Clerk of the Kentucky Court of Appeals in 1963 on the Democratic ticket headed by Edward T. Breathitt. (Clerk of the Court of Appeals was a partisan elective office into the 1970s in Kentucky). Davis served as Clerk from 1964 to 1968. Davis ran for Kentucky State Treasurer in 1967, but lost.

== Treasurer and Secretary of State ==
Davis won election as Kentucky State Treasurer in 1971 on a ticket headed by Wendell H. Ford and served in that office 1972–1976. He then ran for Secretary of State in 1975 on a ticket headed by Julian Carroll and won, serving 1976–1980. Davis then ran for State Treasurer again in 1979 on a ticket headed by John Y. Brown, Jr. and won, serving 1980–1984. Davis' last elective office was Secretary of State of Kentucky, which he won in 1983 on a ticket headed by Martha Layne Collins, serving 1984–1988.

== Retirement ==
In 1991, Davis' son Drexell R. Davis Jr. ran for state treasurer but lost in a crowded Democratic primary to Frances Jones Mills who had held the office previously.

Davis died on December 16, 2009, in Frankfort, Kentucky.

Party political offices
Preceded by Thelma Stovall	Democratic nominee for Kentucky State Treasurer; 1971	Succeeded by Frances Jones Mills
Preceded by Thelma Stovall	Democratic nominee for Secretary of State of Kentucky; 1975	Succeeded by Frances Jones Mills
Preceded by Frances Jones Mills	Democratic nominee for Kentucky State Treasurer; 1979	Succeeded by Frances Jones Mills
Preceded by Frances Jones Mills	Democratic nominee for Secretary of State of Kentucky; 1983	Succeeded by Bremer Ehrler
Legal offices
Preceded by Doris Owens	Clerk of the Kentucky Court of Appeals; 1964–1968	Succeeded by Dick Vermillion
Political offices
Preceded by Thelma Stovall	Kentucky State Treasurer; 1972–1976	Succeeded by Frances Jones Mills
Preceded by Thelma Stovall	Kentucky Secretary of State; 1976–1980	Succeeded by Frances Jones Mills
Preceded by Frances Jones Mills	Kentucky State Treasurer; 1980–1984	Succeeded by Frances Jones Mills
Preceded by Frances Jones Mills	Kentucky Secretary of State; 1984–1988	Succeeded by Bremer Ehrler
