= Kentucky Commissioner of Agriculture =

American state government official

Agriculture Commissioner of Kentucky
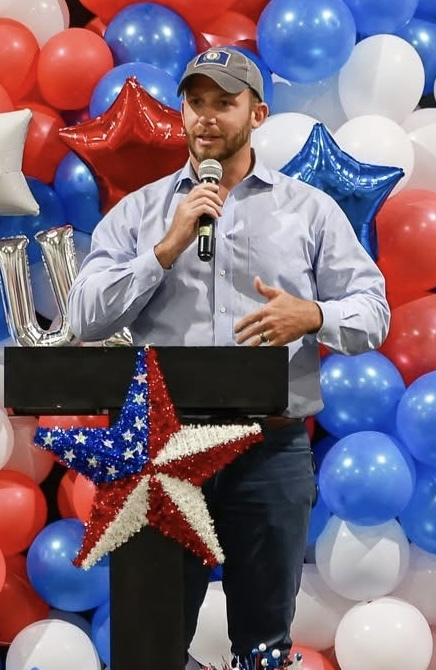
- Incumbent; Jonathan Shell since January 1, 2024
- Term length: 4 years Renewable once
- Formation: 1876
- First holder: Winston Jones Davie
- Salary: $129,375
- Website: https://www.kyagr.com/commissioner/

The Kentucky Commissioner of Agriculture is an elected position in the Commonwealth of Kentucky. The Commissioner of Agriculture serves as head of the Kentucky Department of Agriculture. The commissioner manages agriculture markets, rural development, and the Kentucky Proud Program. The current commissioner of agriculture is Jonathan Shell (R).

== History ==
=== Creation ===
In his message to the 1875-76 Kentucky General Assembly, Governor James B. McCreary called for the creation of a Bureau of Agriculture and Statistics in order to better organize Kentucky's agricultural capacity as well as provide general statistical information. Subsequently, Representative George Washington Craddock of Franklin County filed a bill to establish the Bureau of Agriculture, Immigration, and Statistics. Following a number of amendments as well as discussions by a special committee, the bill was amended to create the Bureau of Agriculture, Horticulture, and Statistics which was to be led by a commissioner appointed by the governor for two-year terms with a set salary of $2,000. The bill received final passage, was signed into law, and took effect on March 20, 1876.

=== Name changes ===
Following the ratification of the 1891 Kentucky Constitution, the office of commissioner was made an elected constitutional office with a four-year term. The following year, the bureau was renamed to the Bureau of Agriculture, Labor, and Statistics. In 1934, the bureau's name was changed again, this time to the Department of Agriculture, Labor, and Statistics. In 1962, the department was renamed for the final time to simply the Department of Agriculture. The commissioner's title was also amended to reflect each name change as they occurred.

== List of commissioners ==
Commissioner of Agriculture, Horticulture, and Statistics (1876–1892)
No.	Image	Name	Term of office	Party
1		Winston Jones Davie	1876–1879	Democratic
2		Charles W. Bowman	1879–1884	Democratic
3		John F. Davis	1884–1888	Democratic
4		Charles Y. Wilson	1888–1892	Democratic

Commissioner of Agriculture, Labor, and Statistics (1892–1962)
No.	Image	Name	Term of office	Party
5		Nicholas McDowell	1892–1896	Democratic
6		Lucas Moore	1896–1900	Republican
7		Ion B. Nall	1900–1904	Democratic
8		C. Hubert Vreeland	1904–1908	Democratic
9		Merrel C. Rankin	1908–1912	Republican
10		John W. Newman	1912–1916	Democratic
11		Mat S. Cohen	1916–1920	Democratic
12		William C. Hanna	1920–1924	Republican
13		Clell Coleman	1924–1928	Democratic
14		Newton Bright	1928–1932	Democratic
15		Eugene Flowers	1932–1936	Democratic
16		Garth Ferguson	1936–1940	Democratic
17		William H. May	1940–1944	Democratic
18		Elliott Robertson	1944–1948	Republican
19		Harry F. Walters	1948–1952	Democratic
20		Ben S. Adams	1951–1956	Democratic
21		Ben J. Butler	1956–1960	Democratic
22		Emerson Beauchamp	1960–1964	Democratic

Commissioner of Agriculture (1962–present)
No.	Image	Name	Term of office	Party
22		Emerson Beauchamp	1960–1964	Democratic
23		Wendell P. Butler	1964–1968	Democratic
24		J. Robert Miller	1968–1972	Republican
25		Wendell P. Butler	1972–1976	Democratic
26		Thomas O. Harris	1976–1980	Democratic
27		Alben W. Barkley II	1980–1984	Democratic
28		David Boswell	1984–1988	Democratic
29		Ward "Butch" Burnette	1988–1991	Democratic
30		Charles L. Hamilton	1991–1992	Democratic
31		Ed Logsdon	1992–1996	Democratic
32		Billy Ray Smith	1996–2004	Democratic
33		Richie Farmer	2004–2012	Republican
34		James Comer	2012–2016	Republican
35		Ryan Quarles	2016–2024	Republican
36		Jonathan Shell	2024–present	Republican
