= List of special elections to the Kentucky Senate =

Special elections to the Kentucky Senate are held when a vacancy occurs in the Kentucky Senate. Elections are called by the governor of Kentucky when the General Assembly is not in session, and by the president of the Senate when it is in session.

== List of special elections ==
District	Original	Cause of vacancy	Winner	Date
18	George M. Plummer (R)	Died January 17, 1970	Luther K. Plummer (R)	February 14, 1970
19	Fred F. Bishop (R)	Died May 8, 1970	Lillie Roberts Bishop (R)	November 3, 1970
35	Romano Mazzoli (D)	Resigned December 16, 1970 (Elected to KY-03)	Lacey Smith (D)	January 15, 1971
6	William A. Logan (D)	Resigned March 17, 1972	Ken Gibson (D)	May 23, 1972
5	Damon Majors (D)		Earl R. Glenn (D)	November 6, 1973
14	William R. Gentry Jr. (D)	Resigned March 19, 1976	Randall Donahue (D)	November 2, 1976
12	Larry J. Hopkins (R)	Resigned December 8, 1978 (Elected to KY-06)	Jack Trevey (R)	January 9, 1979
2	Tom Garrett (D)	Died February 4, 1979	Helen Garrett (D)	May 29, 1979
9	Walter Arnold Baker (R)	Resigned June 15, 1981	Joe Lane Travis (R)	November 3, 1981
1	Richard Weisenberger (D)	Resigned September 30, 1981 (Elected commonwealth's attorney)	Greg Higdon (D)	November 3, 1981
37	Danny Yocom (D)	Resigned September 5, 1986	Larry Saunders (D)	November 4, 1986
24	John Weaver (D)	Died February 25, 1989	Patti Weaver (D)	May 23, 1989
6	William T. Brinkley (D)	Died March 2, 1989	Kim L. Nelson (D)	May 23, 1989
27	Woody May (D)	Resigned November 25, 1991	Walter Blevins (D)	January 7, 1992
1	Greg Higdon (D)	Resigned December 23, 1991	Jeff Green (D)	January 30, 1992
24	Dick Roeding (R)		Gex Williams (R)	February 16, 1993
25	David LeMaster (D)	Resigned January 28, 1994	John David Preston (R)	March 8, 1994
34	Landon Sexton (R)	Resigned February 7, 1994	Barry Metcalf (R)	March 15, 1994
21	Gene Huff (R)	Resigned June 30, 1994	Albert Robinson (R)	July 26, 1994
15	John D. Rogers (R)	Resigned November 10, 1994	James Crase (R)	December 27, 1994
9	Walter Arnold Baker (R)		Richie Sanders (R)	June 25, 1996
13	Mike Moloney (D)	Resigned July 31, 1996	Ernesto Scorsone (D)	November 5, 1996
1	Jeff Green (D)	Died September 5, 1997	Bob Jackson (D)	November 4, 1997
28	Dale Shrout (D)	Resigned August 10, 2001	R. J. Palmer (D)	September 18, 2001
17	Daniel Mongiardo (D)		Damon Thayer (R)	January 28, 2003
4	Paul Herron (D)	Died June 16, 2004	Dorsey Ridley (D)	July 27, 2004
37	None		Perry B. Clark (D)	February 14, 2006
30	Daniel Mongiardo (D)	Resigned December 11, 2007 (Elected lieutenant governor)	Brandon Smith (R)	February 5, 2008
32	Brett Guthrie (R)		Mike Reynolds (D)	February 10, 2009
18	Charlie Borders (R)	Resigned July 15, 2009	Robin L. Webb (D)	August 25, 2009
14	Dan Kelly (R)	Resigned October 26, 2009 (Appointed circuit judge)	Jimmy Higdon (R)	December 8, 2009
19	Tim Shaughnessy (D)	Resigned June 29, 2012	Morgan McGarvey (D)	November 6, 2012
16	David Williams (R)		Sara Beth Gregory (R)	December 18, 2012
13	Kathy Stein (D)		Reggie Thomas (D)	December 10, 2013
27	Walter Blevins (D)		Steve West (R)	March 3, 2015
31	Ray Jones II (D)		Phillip Wheeler (R)	March 5, 2019
38	Dan Seum (R)		Michael J. Nemes (R)	January 14, 2020
26	Ernie Harris (R)		Karen Berg (D)	June 23, 2020
22	Tom Buford (R)	Died July 6, 2021	Donald Douglas (R)	November 2, 2021
19	Morgan McGarvey (D)		Cassie Chambers Armstrong (D)	February 21, 2023
28	Ralph Alvarado (R)		Greg Elkins (R)	May 16, 2023
37	David Yates (D)		Gary Clemons (D)	December 16, 2025
