= 2010 Kentucky Senate election =

- November 2, 2010

19 out of 38 seats in the Kentucky Senate 20 seats needed for a majority
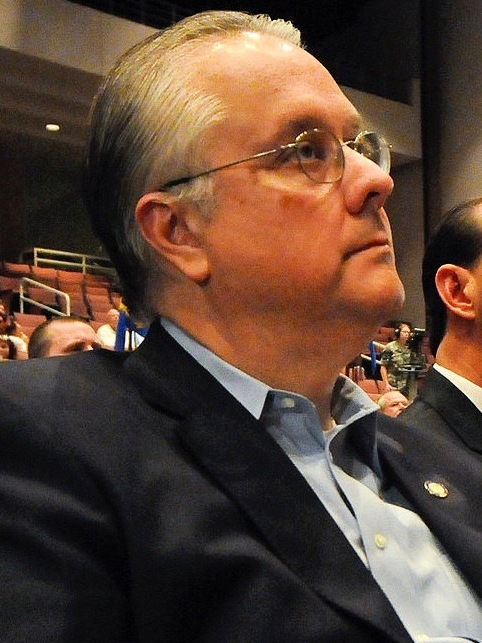

	Majority party	Minority party
Leader	David Williams	Ed Worley (retired)
Party	Republican	Democratic
Leader since	January 5, 1999	January 6, 2003
Leader's seat	16th – Burkesville	34th – Richmond
Last election	22	15
Seats before	20 (Note: Independent senator Bob Leeper caucused with the Republicans.)	17
Seats won	22	15
Seat change	▲2	▼2
Seats up	11	7
Races won	13	5
- Results: Republican hold Republican gain Democratic hold Democratic gain Independent hold No election Popular vote: 50–60% 60–70% >90% 50–60% >90% 40–50%
Senate President before election
David Williams
Republican
Elected Senate President
David Williams
Republican

The 2010 Kentucky Senate election was held on November 2, 2010. The Republican and Democratic primary elections were held on May 18. Half of the senate (all even-numbered seats) were up for election. Republicans increased their majority in the chamber, gaining two seats.

A numbered map of the senate districts at the time can be viewed here.

== Overview ==
Party	Candidates		Votes	%	Seats			
Party	Opposed	Unopposed	Votes	%	Before	Won	After	+/−
Republican	15	3	398,458	57.88	20	13	22	+2
Democratic	15	1	271,350	39.42	17	5	15	-2
Independent	1	0	17,606	2.56	1	1	1	-
Evangelical Christian	1	0	1,004	0.15	0	0	0	-
Total	32	4	688,418	100.00	38	19	38	±0
Source: Kentucky Secretary of State

== Retiring incumbents ==
A total of two senators (one Democrat and one Republican) retired, neither of which ran for other offices.

=== Democratic ===
1. 34th: Ed Worley (Richmond): Retired.

=== Republican ===
1. 20th: Gary Tapp (Shelbyville): Retired.

== Defeated incumbents ==
Three incumbents (two Democrats and one Republican) were defeated for reelection.

=== Democrats ===
1. 8th: David Boswell (first elected in 1990) lost to Joseph R. Bowen.
2. 32nd: Mike Reynolds (elected in February 2009) lost to Mike Wilson.

=== Republicans ===
1. 10th: Elizabeth Tori (first elected in 1994) lost to Dennis Parrett.

== Summary by district ==
Certified results by the Kentucky Secretary of State are available online for the primary election and general election.

District	Incumbent	Party	Elected	Party
2	Bob Leeper	Ind	Bob Leeper	Ind
4	Dorsey Ridley	Dem	Dorsey Ridley	Dem
6	Jerry Rhoads	Dem	Jerry Rhoads	Dem
8	David Boswell	Dem	Joseph R. Bowen	Rep
10	Elizabeth Tori	Rep	Dennis Parrett	Dem
12	Alice Forgy Kerr	Rep	Alice Forgy Kerr	Rep
14	Jimmy Higdon	Rep	Jimmy Higdon	Rep
16	David Williams	Rep	David Williams	Rep
18	Robin L. Webb	Dem	Robin L. Webb	Dem
20	Gary Tapp	Rep	Paul Hornback	Rep
22	Tom Buford	Rep	Tom Buford	Rep
24	Katie Kratz Stine	Rep	Katie Kratz Stine	Rep
26	Ernie Harris	Rep	Ernie Harris	Rep
28	R. J. Palmer	Dem	R. J. Palmer	Dem
30	Brandon Smith	Rep	Brandon Smith	Rep
32	Mike Reynolds	Dem	Mike Wilson	Rep
34	Ed Worley	Dem	Jared Carpenter	Rep
36	Julie Denton	Rep	Julie Denton	Rep
38	Dan Seum	Rep	Dan Seum	Rep

== Closest races ==
Seats where the margin of victory was under 10%:

1. District 12, 2.38%
2. District 2, 2.49%
3. District 10, 3.30% (gain)
4. District 8, 3.34% (gain)
5. District 6, 5.19%
6. District 28, 5.41%
7. District 18, 6.62%

== Predictions ==
Source	Ranking	As of
Governing	Likely R	November 1, 2010

== Special elections ==
=== District 32 special ===
Results by county: Reynolds: 50–60%; Hughes: 70–80%

Mike Reynolds was elected in February 2009 following the resignation of Brett Guthrie.

2009 Kentucky Senate 32nd district special election
Party	Candidate	Votes	%
Democratic	Mike Reynolds	8,283	54.7
Republican	J. Marshall Hughes	6,858	45.3
Total votes		15,141	100.0
Democratic gain from Republican			

=== District 18 special ===
Results by county: Webb: 50–60%; Ditty: 40–50%; 50–60%

Robin L. Webb was elected in August 2009 following the resignation of Charlie Borders.

2009 Kentucky Senate 18th district special election
Party	Candidate	Votes	%
Democratic	Robin L. Webb	8,684	48.1
Republican	Jack F. Ditty	8,402	46.6
Independent	Guy E. Gibbons Jr.	953	5.3
Total votes		18,039	100.0
Democratic gain from Republican			

=== District 14 special ===
Results by county: Higdon: 50–60%; 60–70%; Haydon: 50–60%

Jimmy Higdon was elected in December 2009 following the resignation of Dan Kelly.

2009 Kentucky Senate 14th district special election
Party	Candidate	Votes	%
Republican	Jimmy Higdon	11,327	56.1
Democratic	Jodie Haydon	8,881	43.9
Total votes		20,208	100.0
Republican hold			

== District 2 ==
Incumbent senator Bob Leeper won reelection, defeating Democratic and Republican challengers.

=== Democratic primary ===
==== Candidates ====
===== Nominee =====
- Rex Smith, representative from the 4th district (1987–1995)

=== Republican primary ===
==== Candidates ====
===== Nominee =====
- William Michael East

=== Independent candidates ===
- Bob Leeper, incumbent senator

=== General election ===
==== Results ====
2010 Kentucky Senate 2nd district election
Party	Candidate	Votes	%
Independent	Bob Leeper	17,606	46.3
Democratic	Rex Smith	16,657	43.8
Republican	William Michael East	3,790	10.0
Total votes		38,053	100.0
Independent hold			

== District 4 ==
Incumbent senator Dorsey Ridley won reelection unopposed.

=== Democratic primary ===
==== Candidates ====
===== Nominee =====
- Dorsey Ridley, incumbent senator

=== General election ===
==== Results ====
2010 Kentucky Senate 4th district election
Party	Candidate	Votes	%
Democratic	Dorsey Ridley	Unopposed	
Total votes		26,304	100.0
Democratic hold			

== District 6 ==
Incumbent senator Jerry Rhoads won reelection, defeating Republican Jack Whitfield.

=== Democratic primary ===
==== Candidates ====
===== Nominee =====
- Jerry Rhoads, incumbent senator

=== Republican primary ===
==== Candidates ====
===== Nominee =====
- Jack Whitfield

=== General election ===
==== Results ====
2010 Kentucky Senate 6th district election
Party	Candidate	Votes	%
Democratic	Jerry Rhoads	17,473	52.6
Republican	Jack Whitfield	15,750	47.4
Total votes		33,223	100.0
Democratic hold			

== District 8 ==
Incumbent senator David Boswell was defeated for reelection by Republican Joseph R. Bowen.

=== Democratic primary ===
==== Candidates ====
===== Nominee =====
- David Boswell, incumbent senator

=== Republican primary ===
==== Candidates ====
===== Nominee =====
- Joseph R. Bowen

=== General election ===
==== Results ====
2010 Kentucky Senate 8th district election
Party	Candidate	Votes	%
Republican	Joseph R. Bowen	18,073	51.7
Democratic	David Boswell	16,904	48.3
Total votes		34,977	100.0
Republican gain from Democratic			

== District 10 ==
Incumbent senator Elizabeth Tori was defeated for reelection by Democrat Dennis Parrett.

=== Democratic primary ===
==== Candidates ====
===== Nominee =====
- Dennis Parrett

=== Republican primary ===
==== Candidates ====
===== Nominee =====
- Elizabeth Tori, incumbent senator

=== General election ===
==== Results ====
2010 Kentucky Senate 10th district election
Party	Candidate	Votes	%
Democratic	Dennis Parrett	16,291	51.7
Republican	Elizabeth Tori	15,250	48.3
Total votes		31,541	100.0
Democratic gain from Republican			

== District 12 ==
Incumbent senator Alice Forgy Kerr won reelection, defeating primary and general election challengers.

=== Democratic primary ===
==== Candidates ====
===== Nominee =====
- Don Blevins, County Clerk of Fayette County (1982–2008)

=== Republican primary ===
==== Candidates ====
===== Nominee =====
- Alice Forgy Kerr, incumbent senator

===== Eliminated in primary =====
- Andrew Roberts

==== Results ====
Republican primary results
Party	Candidate	Votes	%
Republican	Alice Forgy Kerr	6,805	71.3
Republican	Andrew Roberts	2,738	28.7
Total votes		9,543	100.0

=== General election ===
==== Endorsements ====
Don Blevins (D)

Newspapers

- The Lexington Herald-Leader

==== Results ====
2010 Kentucky Senate 12th district election
Party	Candidate	Votes	%
Republican	Alice Forgy Kerr	20,341	51.2
Democratic	Don Blevins	19,397	48.8
Total votes		39,738	100.0
Republican hold			

== District 14 ==
Incumbent senator Jimmy Higdon won reelection unopposed.

=== Republican primary ===
==== Candidates ====
===== Nominee =====
- Jimmy Higdon, incumbent senator

=== General election ===
==== Results ====
2010 Kentucky Senate 14th district election
Party	Candidate	Votes	%
Republican	Jimmy Higdon	Unopposed	
Total votes		30,360	100.0
Republican hold			

== District 16 ==
Incumbent senator David Williams won reelection, defeating primary election challenger Denver Capps.

=== Republican primary ===
==== Candidates ====
===== Nominee =====
- David Williams, incumbent senator

===== Eliminated in primary =====
- Denver Capps

==== Results ====
Republican primary results
Party	Candidate	Votes	%
Republican	David Williams	18,407	81.6
Republican	Denver Capps	4,143	18.4
Total votes		22,550	100.0

=== General election ===
==== Results ====
2010 Kentucky Senate 16th district election
Party	Candidate	Votes	%
Republican	David Williams	Unopposed	
Total votes		24,484	100.0
Republican hold			

== District 18 ==
Incumbent senator Robin L. Webb won reelection, defeating Republican Jack Ditty.

=== Democratic primary ===
==== Candidates ====
===== Nominee =====
- Robin L. Webb, incumbent senator

=== Republican primary ===
==== Candidates ====
===== Nominee =====
- Jack Ditty, Republican candidate for this district in August 2009

=== General election ===
==== Results ====
2010 Kentucky Senate 18th district election
Party	Candidate	Votes	%
Democratic	Robin L. Webb	17,617	53.3
Republican	Jack Ditty	15,428	46.7
Total votes		33,045	100.0
Democratic hold			

== District 20 ==
Incumbent senator Gary Tapp did not seek reelection. He was succeeded by Republican Paul Hornback.

=== Democratic primary ===
==== Candidates ====
===== Nominee =====
- David Eaton, candidate for the 58th house district in 2002 and 2004

===== Eliminated in primary =====
- John Spainhour

==== Results ====
Democratic primary results
Party	Candidate	Votes	%
Democratic	David Eaton	8,281	55.6
Democratic	John Spainhour	6,618	44.4
Total votes		14,899	100.0

=== Republican primary ===
==== Candidates ====
===== Nominee =====
- Paul Hornback

===== Eliminated in primary =====
- David Glauber

==== Results ====
Republican primary results
Party	Candidate	Votes	%
Republican	Paul Hornback	5,328	62.9
Republican	David Glauber	3,148	37.1
Total votes		8,476	100.0

=== General election ===
==== Results ====
2010 Kentucky Senate 20th district election
Party	Candidate	Votes	%
Republican	Paul Hornback	26,883	60.5
Democratic	David Eaton	17,588	39.5
Total votes		44,471	100.0
Republican hold			

== District 22 ==
Incumbent senator Tom Buford won reelection, defeating primary election challenger Chad Crouch.

=== Republican primary ===
==== Candidates ====
===== Nominee =====
- Tom Buford, incumbent senator

===== Eliminated in primary =====
- Chad Crouch

==== Results ====
Republican primary results
Party	Candidate	Votes	%
Republican	Tom Buford	6,236	52.9
Republican	Chad Crouch	5,542	47.1
Total votes		11,778	100.0

=== General election ===
==== Results ====
2010 Kentucky Senate 22nd district election
Party	Candidate	Votes	%
Republican	Tom Buford	Unopposed	
Total votes		32,080	100.0
Republican hold			

== District 24 ==
Incumbent senator Katie Kratz Stine won reelection, defeating Democrat Julie Smith-Morrow.

=== Democratic primary ===
==== Candidates ====
===== Nominee =====
- Julie Smith-Morrow

=== Republican primary ===
==== Candidates ====
===== Nominee =====
- Katie Kratz Stine, incumbent senator

=== General election ===
==== Results ====
2010 Kentucky Senate 24th district election
Party	Candidate	Votes	%
Republican	Katie Kratz Stine	22,398	69.2
Democratic	Julie Smith-Morrow	9,978	30.8
Total votes		32,376	100.0
Republican hold			

== District 26 ==
Incumbent senator Ernie Harris won reelection, defeating primary and general election challengers.

=== Democratic primary ===
==== Candidates ====
===== Nominee =====
- John Black

=== Republican primary ===
==== Candidates ====
===== Nominee =====
- Ernie Harris, incumbent senator

===== Eliminated in primary =====
- Don Godfrey

==== Results ====
Republican primary results
Party	Candidate	Votes	%
Republican	Ernie Harris	9,109	71.5
Republican	Don Godfrey	3,626	28.5
Total votes		12,735	100.0

=== General election ===
==== Results ====
2010 Kentucky Senate 26th district election
Party	Candidate	Votes	%
Republican	Ernie Harris	30,305	58.3
Democratic	John Black	21,656	41.7
Total votes		51,961	100.0
Republican hold			

== District 28 ==
Incumbent senator R. J. Palmer won reelection, defeating primary and general election challengers.

=== Democratic primary ===
==== Candidates ====
===== Nominee =====
- R. J. Palmer, incumbent senator

===== Eliminated in primary =====
- Bryan Lutz

==== Results ====
Democratic primary results
Party	Candidate	Votes	%
Democratic	R. J. Palmer	14,575	68.5
Democratic	Bryan Lutz	6,705	31.5
Total votes		21,280	100.0

=== Republican primary ===
==== Candidates ====
===== Nominee =====
- Ralph Alvarado, candidate for the 73rd house district in 2004 and 2006

===== Eliminated in primary =====
- Ryan Dotson

==== Results ====
Republican primary results
Party	Candidate	Votes	%
Republican	Ralph Alvarado	3,386	65.5
Republican	Ryan Dotson	1,780	34.5
Total votes		5,166	100.0

=== General election ===
==== Results ====
2010 Kentucky Senate 28th district election
Party	Candidate	Votes	%
Democratic	R. J. Palmer	18,876	52.7
Republican	Ralph Alvarado	16,940	47.3
Total votes		35,816	100.0
Democratic hold			

== District 30 ==
Incumbent senator Brandon Smith won reelection, defeating Democrat Johnnie L. Turner.

=== Democratic primary ===
==== Candidates ====
===== Nominee =====
- Johnnie L. Turner, representative from the 88th district (1999–2003)

=== Republican primary ===
==== Candidates ====
===== Nominee =====
- Brandon Smith, incumbent senator

=== General election ===
==== Results ====
2010 Kentucky Senate 30th district election
Party	Candidate	Votes	%
Republican	Brandon Smith	20,870	67.2
Democratic	Johnnie L. Turner	10,180	32.8
Total votes		31,050	100.0
Republican hold			

== District 32 ==
Incumbent senator Mike Reynolds was defeated for reelection by Republican Mike Wilson.

=== Democratic primary ===
==== Candidates ====
===== Nominee =====
- Mike Reynolds, incumbent senator

=== Republican primary ===
==== Candidates ====
===== Nominee =====
- Mike Wilson

===== Eliminated in primary =====
- Ed Mills
- Regina Webb

==== Results ====
Republican primary results
Party	Candidate	Votes	%
Republican	Mike Wilson	5,025	51.5
Republican	Regina Webb	3,077	31.5
Republican	Ed Mills	1,656	17.0
Total votes		9,758	100.0

=== General election ===
==== Results ====
2010 Kentucky Senate 32nd district election
Party	Candidate	Votes	%
Republican	Mike Wilson	18,935	55.0
Democratic	Mike Reynolds	15,490	45.0
Total votes		34,425	100.0
Republican gain from Democratic			

== District 34 ==
Incumbent senator Ed Worley did not seek reelection. He was succeeded by Republican Jared Carpenter.

=== Democratic primary ===
==== Candidates ====
===== Nominee =====
- Lee Murphy

===== Eliminated in primary =====
- Michael Cope
- Landra Lewis

==== Results ====
Democratic primary results
Party	Candidate	Votes	%
Democratic	Lee Murphy	4,452	35.5
Democratic	Landra Lewis	4,106	32.8
Democratic	Michael Cope	3,966	31.7
Total votes		12,524	100.0

=== Republican primary ===
==== Candidates ====
===== Nominee =====
- Jared Carpenter

===== Eliminated in primary =====
- Kent Kessler
- Barry Metcalf, senator from the 34th district (1994–1999) and candidate in 2002 and 2006

==== Results ====
Republican primary results
Party	Candidate	Votes	%
Republican	Jared Carpenter	4,405	37.9
Republican	Kent Kessler	4,264	36.7
Republican	Barry Metcalf	2,955	25.4
Total votes		11,624	100.0

=== Third-party candidates ===
==== Evangelical Christian ====
- Donald VanWinkle

=== General election ===
==== Results ====
2010 Kentucky Senate 34th district election
Party	Candidate	Votes	%
Republican	Jared Carpenter	23,553	64.9
Democratic	Lee Murphy	11,719	32.3
Evangelical Christian	Donald VanWinkle	1,004	2.8
Total votes		36,276	100.0
Republican gain from Democratic			

== District 36 ==
Incumbent senator Julie Denton won reelection, defeating primary and general election challengers.

=== Democratic primary ===
==== Candidates ====
===== Nominee =====
- Rick Hiles

=== Republican primary ===
==== Candidates ====
===== Nominee =====
- Julie Denton, incumbent senator

===== Eliminated in primary =====
- Shawn Slone

==== Results ====
Republican primary results
Party	Candidate	Votes	%
Republican	Julie Denton	10,135	71.7
Republican	Shawn Slone	4,000	28.3
Total votes		14,135	100.0

=== General election ===
==== Results ====
2010 Kentucky Senate 36th district election
Party	Candidate	Votes	%
Republican	Julie Denton	36,864	66.8
Democratic	Rick Hiles	18,291	33.2
Total votes		55,155	100.0
Republican hold			

== District 38 ==
Incumbent senator Dan Seum won reelection, defeating Democrat Marty Meyer.

=== Democratic primary ===
==== Candidates ====
===== Nominee =====
- Marty Meyer

=== Republican primary ===
==== Candidates ====
===== Nominee =====
- Dan Seum, incumbent senator

=== General election ===
==== Results ====
2010 Kentucky Senate 38th district election
Party	Candidate	Votes	%
Republican	Dan Seum	26,154	60.7
Democratic	Marty Meyer	16,929	39.3
Total votes		43,083	100.0
Republican hold			

== See also ==
- 2010 Kentucky elections
  - 2010 Kentucky House of Representatives election
  - 2010 United States Senate election in Kentucky
  - 2010 United States House of Representatives elections in Kentucky
