= 2014 Kentucky Senate election =

- November 4, 2014

19 out of 38 seats in the Kentucky Senate 20 seats needed for a majority
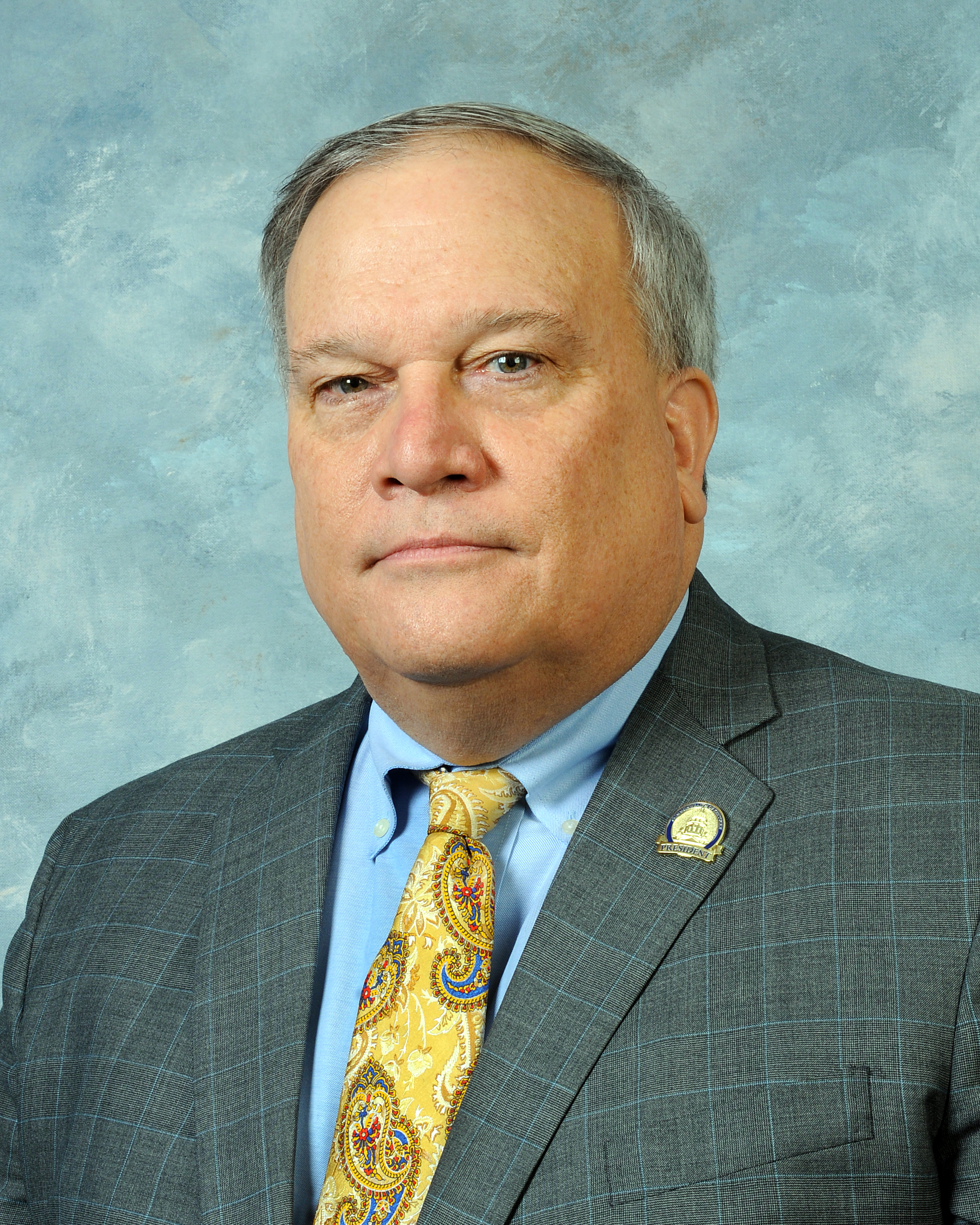

	Majority party	Minority party
Leader	Robert Stivers	R. J. Palmer II (lost reelection)
Party	Republican	Democratic
Leader since	January 8, 2013	January 4, 2011
Leader's seat	25th – Manchester	28th – Winchester
Last election	23 (Note: Independent senator Bob Leeper caucused with the Republicans.)	14
Seats won	26	12
Seat change	▲3	▼2
Seats up	13	5
Races won	16	3
- Republican hold Republican gain Democratic hold No election 50–60% 60–70% 70–80% >90% 60–70% >90%
Senate President before election
Robert Stivers
Republican
Elected Senate President
Robert Stivers
Republican

The 2014 Kentucky Senate election was held on November 4, 2014. The Republican and Democratic primary elections were held on May 20. Half of the senate (all even-numbered seats) were up for election. Republicans increased their majority in the chamber, gaining three seats.

A numbered map of the senate districts at the time can be viewed here.

== Overview ==
Party	Candidates		Votes	%	Seats			
Party	Opposed	Unopposed	Votes	%	Before	Won	After	+/−
Republican	9	8	444,656	70.06	23	16	26	+3
Democratic	9	2	190,052	29.94	14	3	12	-2
Independent	0	0	0	0.00	1	0	0	-1
Total	18	10	634,708	100.00	38	19	38	±0
Source: Kentucky Secretary of State

== Retiring incumbents ==
A total of four senators (one Democrat, two Republicans, and one independent) retired, two of whom ran for another office.

=== Democratic ===
1. 6th: Jerry P. Rhoads (Madisonville): Retired.

=== Republican ===
1. 24th: Katie Kratz Stine (Southgate): Retired.
2. 36th: Julie Carman Denton (Louisville): Retired to run for the Louisville Metro Council.

=== Independent ===
1. 2nd: Robert J. "Bob" Leeper (Paducah): Retired to run for Judge/Executive of McCracken County.

== Incumbents defeated ==
One incumbent lost renomination in the primary election, and one incumbent lost reelection in the general election.

=== In the primary election ===
==== Republicans ====
One Republican lost renomination.

1. 16th: Sara Beth Gregory (elected in December 2012) lost renomination to George Maxwell "Max" Wise, who won the general election.

=== In the general election ===
==== Democrats ====
One Democrat lost reelection to a Republican.

1. 28th: R. J. Palmer II (first elected in 2001) lost to Ralph Alvarado.

== Predictions ==
Source	Ranking	As of
Governing	Safe R	October 20, 2014

== Summary by district ==
Certified results by the Kentucky Secretary of State are available online for the primary election and general election.

† – Incumbent not seeking re-election

District	Incumbent	Party	Elected	Party
2	Robert J. "Bob" Leeper†	Ind	Danny Carroll	Rep
4	J. Dorsey Ridley	Dem	J. Dorsey Ridley	Dem
6	Jerry P. Rhoads†	Dem	C. B. Embry Jr.	Rep
8	Joe Bowen	Rep	Joe Bowen	Rep
10	Dennis L. Parrett	Dem	Dennis L. Parrett	Dem
12	Alice Forgy Kerr	Rep	Alice Forgy Kerr	Rep
14	Jimmy Higdon	Rep	Jimmy Higdon	Rep
16	Sara Beth Gregory	Rep	George Maxwell "Max" Wise	Rep
18	Robin Webb	Dem	Robin Webb	Dem
20	Paul R. Hornback	Rep	Paul R. Hornback	Rep
22	Tom Buford	Rep	Tom Buford	Rep
24	Katie Kratz Stine†	Rep	Wil Schroder	Rep
26	Ernie Harris	Rep	Ernie Harris	Rep
28	R. J. Palmer II	Dem	Ralph Alvarado	Rep
30	Brandon D. Smith	Rep	Brandon D. Smith	Rep
32	Mike Wilson	Rep	Mike Wilson	Rep
34	Jared K. Carpenter	Rep	Jared K. Carpenter	Rep
36	Julie Carman Denton†	Rep	Julie Raque Adams	Rep
38	Dan Malano Seum	Rep	Dan Malano Seum	Rep

== Closest races ==
Seats where the margin of victory was under 10%:

1. District 28, 5.61% (gain)

== Special elections ==
=== District 13 special ===
Reggie Thomas was elected in December 2013 following the resignation of Kathy Stein.

2013 Kentucky Senate 13th district special election
Party	Candidate	Votes	%
Democratic	Reggie Thomas	4,040	53.8
Independent	Richard Moloney	2,617	34.8
Republican	Michael Johnson	851	11.3
Write-in	Michael Graetz	2	0.0
Total votes		7,510	100.0
Democratic hold			

== District 2 ==
Incumbent senator Robert J. "Bob" Leeper did not seek reelection. He was succeeded by Republican Danny Carroll.

=== Democratic primary ===
==== Candidates ====
===== Nominee =====
- Jeff G. Parker

=== Republican primary ===
==== Candidates ====
===== Nominee =====
- Danny Carroll

===== Eliminated in primary =====
- David Hoffman

==== Results ====
Republican primary results
Party	Candidate	Votes	%
Republican	Danny Carroll	3,195	54.9
Republican	David Hoffman	2,621	45.1
Total votes		5,816	100.0

=== General election ===
==== Results ====
2014 Kentucky Senate 2nd district election
Party	Candidate	Votes	%
Republican	Danny Carroll	24,752	58.5
Democratic	Jeff G. Parker	17,585	41.5
Total votes		42,337	100.0
Republican gain from Independent			

== District 4 ==
Incumbent senator J. Dorsey Ridley won reelection unopposed.

=== Democratic primary ===
==== Candidates ====
===== Nominee =====
- J. Dorsey Ridley, incumbent senator

=== General election ===
==== Results ====
2014 Kentucky Senate 4th district election
Party	Candidate	Votes	%
Democratic	J. Dorsey Ridley (incumbent)	Unopposed	
Total votes		26,811	100.0
Democratic hold			

== District 6 ==
Incumbent senator Jerry P. Rhoads did not seek reelection. He was succeeded by Republican C. B. Embry Jr.

=== Democratic primary ===
==== Candidates ====
===== Nominee =====
- William M. Cox Jr.

===== Eliminated in primary =====
- M. Douglas "Doug" Smith

==== Results ====
Democratic primary results
Party	Candidate	Votes	%
Democratic	William M. Cox Jr.	7,411	66.9
Democratic	M. Douglas "Doug" Smith	3,665	33.1
Total votes		11,076	100.0

=== Republican primary ===
==== Candidates ====
===== Nominee =====
- C. B. Embry Jr., representative from the 17th district (2003–2015)

=== General election ===
==== Results ====
2014 Kentucky Senate 6th district election
Party	Candidate	Votes	%
Republican	C. B. Embry Jr.	21,591	57.1
Democratic	William M. Cox Jr.	16,230	42.9
Total votes		37,821	100.0
Republican gain from Democratic			

== District 8 ==
Incumbent senator Joe Bowen won reelection unopposed.

=== Republican primary ===
==== Candidates ====
===== Nominee =====
- Joe Bowen, incumbent senator

=== General election ===
==== Results ====
2014 Kentucky Senate 8th district election
Party	Candidate	Votes	%
Republican	Joe Bowen (incumbent)	Unopposed	
Total votes		29,140	100.0
Republican hold			

== District 10 ==
Incumbent senator Dennis L. Parrett won reelection unopposed.

=== Democratic primary ===
==== Candidates ====
===== Nominee =====
- Dennis L. Parrett, incumbent senator

=== General election ===
==== Results ====
2014 Kentucky Senate 10th district election
Party	Candidate	Votes	%
Democratic	Dennis L. Parrett (incumbent)	Unopposed	
Total votes		23,823	100.0
Democratic hold			

== District 12 ==
Incumbent senator Alice Forgy Kerr won reelection, defeating Democratic candidate Kathy Warnecke Ryan.

=== Democratic primary ===
==== Candidates ====
===== Nominee =====
- Kathy Warnecke Ryan

=== Republican primary ===
==== Candidates ====
===== Nominee =====
- Alice Forgy Kerr, incumbent senator

=== General election ===
==== Results ====
2014 Kentucky Senate 12th district election
Party	Candidate	Votes	%
Republican	Alice Forgy Kerr (incumbent)	26,458	62.9
Democratic	Kathy Warnecke Ryan	15,583	37.1
Total votes		42,041	100.0
Republican hold			

== District 14 ==
Incumbent senator Jimmy Higdon won reelection unopposed.

=== Republican primary ===
==== Candidates ====
===== Nominee =====
- Jimmy Higdon, incumbent senator

=== General election ===
==== Results ====
2014 Kentucky Senate 14th district election
Party	Candidate	Votes	%
Republican	Jimmy Higdon (incumbent)	Unopposed	
Total votes		31,413	100.0
Republican hold			

== District 16 ==
Incumbent Republican senator Sara Beth Gregory was defeated for renomination by George Maxwell "Max" Wise.

=== Republican primary ===
==== Candidates ====
===== Nominee =====
- George Maxwell "Max" Wise

===== Eliminated in primary =====
- Sara Beth Gregory, incumbent senator

==== Results ====
Republican primary results
Party	Candidate	Votes	%
Republican	George Maxwell "Max" Wise	14,037	54.5
Republican	Sara Beth Gregory (incumbent)	11,743	45.5
Total votes		25,780	100.0

=== General election ===
==== Results ====
2014 Kentucky Senate 16th district election
Party	Candidate	Votes	%
Republican	George Maxwell "Max" Wise	Unopposed	
Total votes		31,918	100.0
Republican hold			

== District 18 ==
Incumbent senator Robin Webb won reelection, defeating Republican candidate Tony Downey.

=== Democratic primary ===
==== Candidates ====
===== Nominee =====
- Robin Webb, incumbent senator

=== Republican primary ===
==== Candidates ====
===== Nominee =====
- Tony Downey

=== General election ===
==== Results ====
2014 Kentucky Senate 18th district election
Party	Candidate	Votes	%
Democratic	Robin Webb (incumbent)	21,533	62.7
Republican	Tony Downey	12,817	37.3
Total votes		34,350	100.0
Democratic hold			

== District 20 ==
Incumbent senator Paul R. Hornback won reelection, defeating primary election challenger Tony McCurdy.

=== Republican primary ===
==== Candidates ====
===== Nominee =====
- Paul R. Hornback, incumbent senator

===== Eliminated in primary =====
- Tony McCurdy

==== Results ====
Republican primary results
Party	Candidate	Votes	%
Republican	Paul R. Hornback (incumbent)	6,079	82.9
Republican	Tony McCurdy	1,256	17.1
Total votes		7,335	100.0

=== General election ===
==== Results ====
2014 Kentucky Senate 20th district election
Party	Candidate	Votes	%
Republican	Paul R. Hornback (incumbent)	Unopposed	
Total votes		29,810	100.0
Republican hold			

== District 22 ==
Incumbent senator Tom Buford won reelection unopposed.

=== Republican primary ===
==== Candidates ====
===== Nominee =====
- Tom Buford, incumbent senator

=== General election ===
==== Results ====
2014 Kentucky Senate 22nd district election
Party	Candidate	Votes	%
Republican	Tom Buford (incumbent)	Unopposed	
Total votes		28,089	100.0
Republican hold			

== District 24 ==
Incumbent senator Katie Kratz Stine did not seek reelection. She was succeeded by Republican Wil Schroder.

=== Democratic primary ===
==== Candidates ====
===== Nominee =====
- Jason Michael Steffen

=== Republican primary ===
==== Candidates ====
===== Nominee =====
- Wil Schroder

===== Eliminated in primary =====
- Deb Sheldon
- Brandon N. Voelker

==== Results ====
Republican primary results
Party	Candidate	Votes	%
Republican	Wil Schroder	4,555	50.3
Republican	Deb Sheldon	2,439	26.9
Republican	Brandon N. Voelker	2,057	22.7
Total votes		9,051	100.0

=== General election ===
==== Results ====
2014 Kentucky Senate 24th district election
Party	Candidate	Votes	%
Republican	Wil Schroder	21,792	61.7
Democratic	Jason Michael Steffen	13,547	38.3
Total votes		35,339	100.0
Republican hold			

== District 26 ==
Incumbent senator Ernie Harris won reelection unopposed.

=== Republican primary ===
==== Candidates ====
===== Nominee =====
- Ernie Harris, incumbent senator

=== General election ===
==== Results ====
2014 Kentucky Senate 26th district election
Party	Candidate	Votes	%
Republican	Ernie Harris (incumbent)	Unopposed	
Total votes		34,827	100.0
Republican hold			

== District 28 ==
Incumbent senator R. J. Palmer II was defeated for reelection by Republican Ralph Alvarado.

=== Democratic primary ===
==== Candidates ====
===== Nominee =====
- R. J. Palmer II, incumbent senator

=== Republican primary ===
==== Candidates ====
===== Nominee =====
- Ralph Alvarado

=== General election ===
==== Results ====
2014 Kentucky Senate 28th district election
Party	Candidate	Votes	%
Republican	Ralph Alvarado	18,636	52.8
Democratic	R. J. Palmer II (incumbent)	16,656	47.2
Total votes		35,292	100.0
Republican gain from Democratic			

== District 30 ==
Incumbent senator Brandon D. Smith won reelection, defeating Democratic candidate Jordan Bowling Palmer.

=== Democratic primary ===
==== Candidates ====
===== Nominee =====
- Jordan Bowling Palmer

=== Republican primary ===
==== Candidates ====
===== Nominee =====
- Brandon D. Smith, incumbent senator

=== General election ===
==== Results ====
2014 Kentucky Senate 30th district election
Party	Candidate	Votes	%
Republican	Brandon D. Smith (incumbent)	27,447	73.8
Democratic	Jordan Bowling Palmer	9,733	26.2
Total votes		37,180	100.0
Republican hold			

== District 32 ==
Incumbent senator Mike Wilson won reelection unopposed.

=== Republican primary ===
==== Candidates ====
===== Nominee =====
- Mike Wilson, incumbent senator

=== General election ===
==== Results ====
2014 Kentucky Senate 32nd district election
Party	Candidate	Votes	%
Republican	Mike Wilson (incumbent)	Unopposed	
Total votes		24,666	100.0
Republican hold			

== District 34 ==
Incumbent senator Jared K. Carpenter won reelection, defeating Democratic candidate Michael S. Pope.

=== Democratic primary ===
==== Candidates ====
===== Nominee =====
- Michael S. Pope

=== Republican primary ===
==== Candidates ====
===== Nominee =====
- Jared K. Carpenter, incumbent senator

=== General election ===
==== Results ====
2014 Kentucky Senate 34th district election
Party	Candidate	Votes	%
Republican	Jared K. Carpenter (incumbent)	22,932	64.6
Democratic	Michael S. Pope	12,540	35.4
Total votes		35,472	100.0
Republican hold			

== District 36 ==
Incumbent senator Julie Carman Denton did not seek reelection. She was succeeded by Republican Julie Raque Adams.

=== Democratic primary ===
==== Candidates ====
===== Nominee =====
- Siddique Malik

=== Republican primary ===
==== Candidates ====
===== Nominee =====
- Julie Raque Adams, representative from the 32nd district (2011–2015)

=== General election ===
==== Results ====
2014 Kentucky Senate 36th district election
Party	Candidate	Votes	%
Republican	Julie Raque Adams	31,623	66.4
Democratic	Siddique Malik	16,011	33.6
Total votes		47,634	100.0
Republican hold			

== District 38 ==
Incumbent senator Dan Malano Seum won reelection, defeating primary election challenger Brenda Sue "Susie" Board.

=== Republican primary ===
==== Candidates ====
===== Nominee =====
- Dan Malano Seum, incumbent senator

===== Eliminated in primary =====
- Brenda Sue "Susie" Board

==== Results ====
Republican primary results
Party	Candidate	Votes	%
Republican	Dan Malano Seum (incumbent)	5,280	74.2
Republican	Brenda Sue "Susie" Board	1,832	25.8
Total votes		7,112	100.0

=== General election ===
==== Results ====
2014 Kentucky Senate 38th district election
Party	Candidate	Votes	%
Republican	Dan Malano Seum (incumbent)	Unopposed	
Total votes		26,745	100.0
Republican hold			

== See also ==
- 2014 Kentucky elections
  - 2014 United States Senate election in Kentucky
  - 2014 Kentucky House of Representatives election
  - 2014 United States House of Representatives elections in Kentucky
