= 2018 Kentucky Senate election =

- November 6, 2018

19 out of 38 seats in the Kentucky Senate 20 seats needed for a majority
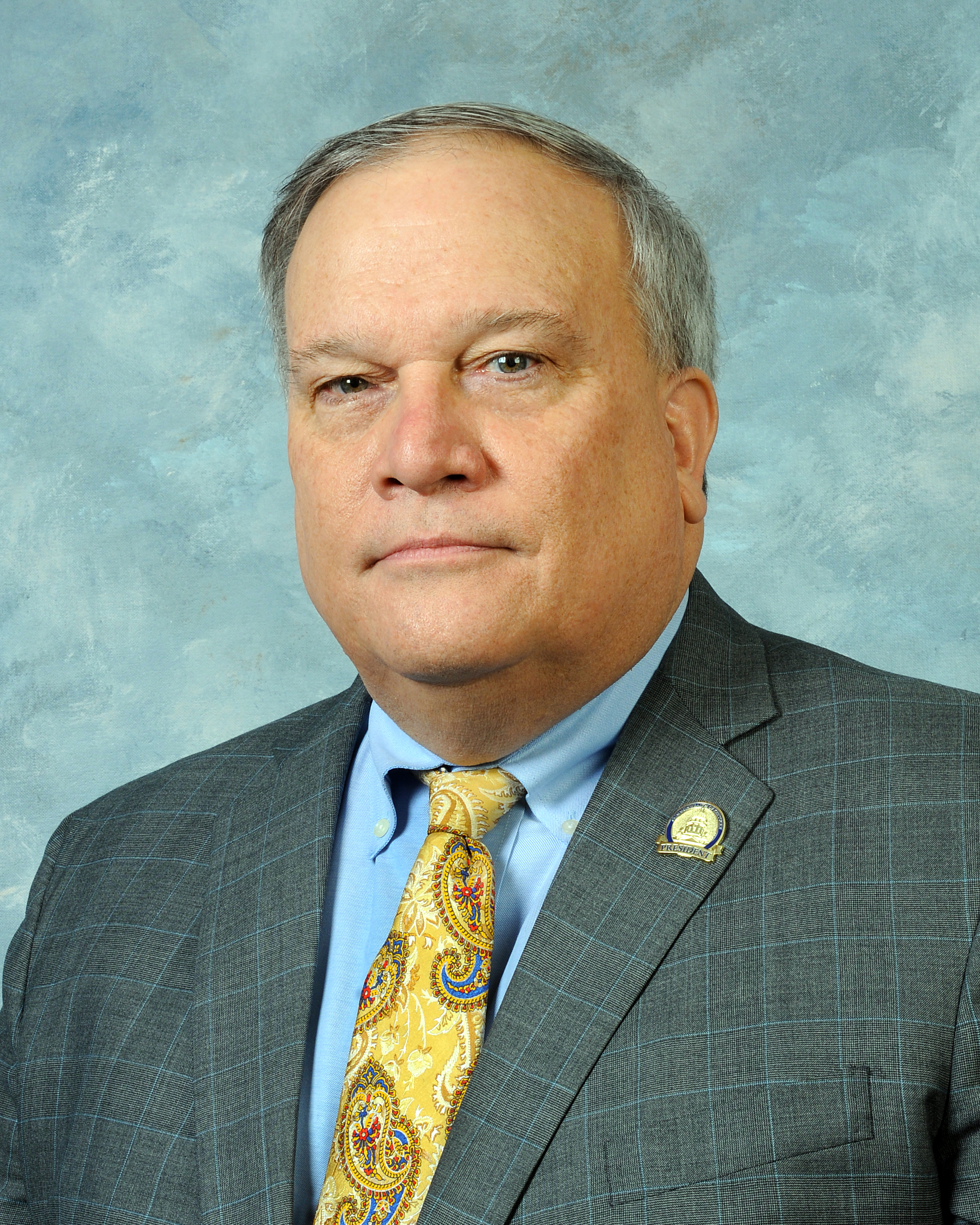

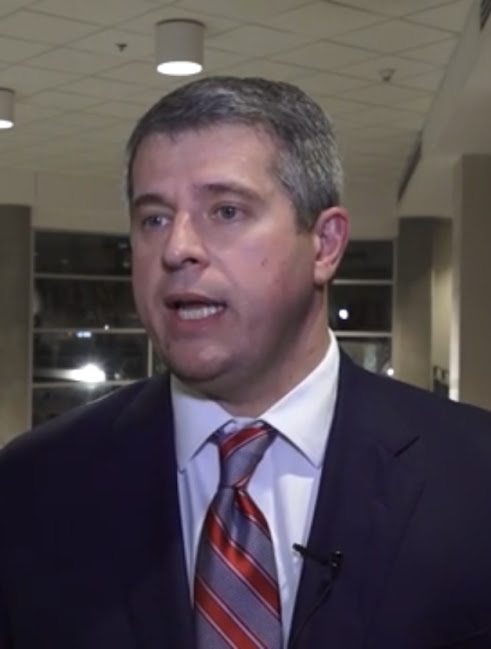
	Majority party	Minority party
Leader	Robert Stivers	Ray Jones
Party	Republican	Democratic
Leader since	January 8, 2013	January 6, 2015
Leader's seat	25th – Manchester	31st – Pikeville
Last election	27	11
Seats won	28	10
Seat change	▲1	▼1
Seats up	16	3
Races won	17	2
- Republican hold Republican gain Democratic hold No election 50–60% 60–70% 70–80% >90% 50–60% >90%
Senate President before election
Robert Stivers
Republican
Elected Senate President
Robert Stivers
Republican

The 2018 Kentucky Senate election was held on November 6, 2018. The Republican and Democratic primary elections were held on May 22. Half of the senate (all even-numbered seats) were up for election. Republicans increased their majority in the chamber, gaining one seat.

A numbered map of the senate districts at the time can be viewed here.

== Overview ==
Party	Candidates		Votes	%	Seats			
Party	Opposed	Unopposed	Votes	%	Before	Won	After	+/−
Republican	18	0	468,530	57.93	27	17	28	+1
Democratic	16	1	325,800	40.29	11	2	10	-1
Independent	2	0	10,946	1.35	0	0	0	-
Write-in	2	0	3,454	0.43	0	0	0	-
Total	38	1	808,730	100.00	38	19	38	±0
Source: Kentucky Secretary of State

== Retiring incumbents ==
One senator retired, who did not run for another office.

1. 8th: Joe Bowen (Owensboro) retired.

== Incumbents defeated ==
One incumbent lost reelection in the general election.

1. 4th: J. Dorsey Ridley (first elected in 2004) lost to Robert M. "Robby" Mills.

== Summary by district ==
Certified results by the Kentucky Secretary of State are available online for the primary election and general election.

† – Incumbent not seeking re-election

District	Incumbent	Party	Elected	Party
2	Danny Carroll	Rep	Danny Carroll	Rep
4	J. Dorsey Ridley	Dem	Robert M. "Robby" Mills	Rep
6	C. B. Embry Jr.	Rep	C. B. Embry Jr.	Rep
8	Joe Bowen†	Rep	Matt Castlen	Rep
10	Dennis L. Parrett	Dem	Dennis L. Parrett	Dem
12	Alice Forgy Kerr	Rep	Alice Forgy Kerr	Rep
14	Jimmy Higdon	Rep	Jimmy Higdon	Rep
16	George Maxwell "Max" Wise	Rep	George Maxwell "Max" Wise	Rep
18	Robin L. Webb	Dem	Robin L. Webb	Dem
20	Paul R. Hornback	Rep	Paul R. Hornback	Rep
22	Tom Buford	Rep	Tom Buford	Rep
24	Wil Schroder	Rep	Wil Schroder	Rep
26	Ernie Harris	Rep	Ernie Harris	Rep
28	Ralph Alvarado	Rep	Ralph Alvarado	Rep
30	Brandon Smith	Rep	Brandon Smith	Rep
32	Mike Wilson	Rep	Mike Wilson	Rep
34	Jared K. Carpenter	Rep	Jared K. Carpenter	Rep
36	Julie Raque Adams	Rep	Julie Raque Adams	Rep
38	Dan Malano Seum	Rep	Dan Malano Seum	Rep

== Crossover seats ==
=== Democratic ===
Three districts voted for Donald Trump in 2016 but had Democratic incumbents:

District		Incumbent		
#	Trump margin of victory in 2016	Member	Party	Incumbent margin of victory in 2014
4	R+44.38	J. Dorsey Ridley	Democratic	Unopposed
10	R+30.39	Dennis L. Parrett	Democratic	Unopposed
18	R+43.15	Robin L. Webb	Democratic	D+25.37

=== Republican ===
None.

== Closest races ==
Seats where the margin of victory was under 10%:

1. District 4, 1.29% (gain)
2. District 12, 1.46%
3. District 32, 4.66%
4. District 26, 5.42%
5. District 28, 6.71%
6. District 36, 6.74%

== Predictions ==
Source	Ranking	As of
Governing	Safe R	October 8, 2018

== District 2 ==
Incumbent senator Danny Carroll won reelection, defeating Democratic candidate Julie Tennyson.

=== Democratic primary ===
==== Candidates ====
===== Nominee =====
- Julie Tennyson

=== Republican primary ===
==== Candidates ====
===== Nominee =====
- Danny Carroll, incumbent senator

=== General election ===
==== Results ====
Results by county: Carroll: 60–70%

2018 Kentucky Senate 2nd district election
Party	Candidate	Votes	%
Republican	Danny Carroll (incumbent)	28,252	63.2
Democratic	Julie Tennyson	16,428	36.8
Total votes		44,680	100.0
Republican hold			

== District 4 ==
Incumbent senator J. Dorsey Ridley was defeated for reelection by Republican Robert M. "Robby" Mills.

=== Democratic primary ===
==== Candidates ====
===== Nominee =====
- J. Dorsey Ridley, incumbent senator

=== Republican primary ===
==== Candidates ====
===== Nominee =====
- Robert M. "Robby" Mills, representative from the 11th district (2017–2019)

=== General election ===
==== Results ====
Results by county: Mills: 50–60%; 60–70%; Ridley: 50–60%

2018 Kentucky Senate 4th district election
Party	Candidate	Votes	%
Republican	Robert M. "Robby" Mills	19,057	50.6
Democratic	J. Dorsey Ridley (incumbent)	18,573	49.4
Total votes		37,630	100.0
Republican gain from Democratic			

===== Results by county =====
County	Robert M. "Robby" Mills		J. Dorsey Ridley		Margin		Total votes
County	#	%	#	%	#	%	Total votes
Caldwell	2,660	53.53	2,309	46.47	351	7.06	4,969
Crittenden	2,144	63.75	1,219	36.25	925	27.51	3,363
Henderson	6,586	43.03	8,718	56.97	-2,132	-13.93	15,304
Livingston	2,216	58.15	1,595	41.85	621	16.29	3,811
Union	3,028	53.23	2,661	46.77	367	6.45	5,689
Webster	2,423	53.92	2,071	46.08	352	7.83	4,494
Total	19,057	50.64	18,573	49.36	484	1.29	37,630

== District 6 ==
Incumbent senator C. B. Embry Jr. won reelection, defeating Democratic candidate Crystal Chappell.

=== Democratic primary ===
==== Candidates ====
===== Nominee =====
- Crystal Chappell

=== Republican primary ===
==== Candidates ====
===== Nominee =====
- C. B. Embry Jr., incumbent senator

=== General election ===
==== Results ====
Results by county: Embry: 50–60%; 60–70%; 70–80%; 80–90%

2018 Kentucky Senate 6th district election
Party	Candidate	Votes	%
Republican	C. B. Embry Jr. (incumbent)	27,139	67.2
Democratic	Crystal Chappell	13,217	32.8
Total votes		40,356	100.0
Republican hold			

== District 8 ==
Incumbent senator Joe Bowen did not seek reelection. He was succeeded by Republican Matt Castlen.

=== Democratic primary ===
==== Candidates ====
===== Nominee =====
- Bob Glenn

=== Republican primary ===
==== Candidates ====
===== Nominee =====
- Matt Castlen, representative from the 14th district (2017–2019)

===== Eliminated in primary =====
- Dianne Burns Mackey

==== Results ====
Republican primary results
Party	Candidate	Votes	%
Republican	Matt Castlen	4,530	65.0
Republican	Dianne Burns Mackey	2,441	35.0
Total votes		6,971	100.0

=== General election ===
==== Results ====
Results by county: Castlen: 50–60%; 60–70%

2018 Kentucky Senate 8th district election
Party	Candidate	Votes	%
Republican	Matt Castlen	25,107	58.2
Democratic	Bob Glenn	18,019	41.8
Total votes		43,126	100.0
Republican hold			

== District 10 ==
Incumbent senator Dennis L. Parrett won reelection unopposed.

=== Democratic primary ===
==== Candidates ====
===== Nominee =====
- Dennis L. Parrett, incumbent senator

=== General election ===
==== Results ====
2018 Kentucky Senate 10th district election
Party	Candidate	Votes	%
Democratic	Dennis L. Parrett (incumbent)	Unopposed	
Total votes		24,224	100.0
Democratic hold			

== District 12 ==
Incumbent senator Alice Forgy Kerr won reelection, defeating Democratic candidate Paula Setser-Kissick.

=== Democratic primary ===
==== Candidates ====
===== Nominee =====
- Paula Setser-Kissick

=== Republican primary ===
==== Candidates ====
===== Nominee =====
- Alice Forgy Kerr, incumbent senator

=== General election ===
==== Results ====
2018 Kentucky Senate 12th district election
Party	Candidate	Votes	%
Republican	Alice Forgy Kerr (incumbent)	26,874	50.7
Democratic	Paula Setser-Kissick	26,102	49.3
Total votes		52,976	100.0
Republican hold			

== District 14 ==
Incumbent senator Jimmy Higdon won reelection, defeating Democratic candidate Stephanie Compton.

=== Democratic primary ===
==== Candidates ====
===== Nominee =====
- Stephanie Compton

=== Republican primary ===
==== Candidates ====
===== Nominee =====
- Jimmy Higdon, incumbent senator

=== General election ===
==== Results ====
Results by county: Higdon: 60–70%; 70–80%; 80–90%

2018 Kentucky Senate 14th district election
Party	Candidate	Votes	%
Republican	Jimmy Higdon (incumbent)	29,752	65.3
Democratic	Stephanie Compton	15,842	34.7
Total votes		45,594	100.0
Republican hold			

== District 16 ==
Incumbent senator George Maxwell "Max" Wise won reelection, defeating write-in candidate Nicole Britton.

=== Republican primary ===
==== Candidates ====
===== Nominee =====
- George Maxwell "Max" Wise, incumbent senator

=== General election ===
==== Results ====
2018 Kentucky Senate 16th district election
Party	Candidate	Votes	%
Republican	George Maxwell "Max" Wise (incumbent)	33,447	96.7
Write-in	Nicole Britton	1,125	3.3
Total votes		34,572	100.0
Republican hold			

== District 18 ==
2018 Kentucky Senate 18th district election
- November 6, 2018
Nominee	Robin L. Webb	Scott L. Sharp
Party	Democratic	Republican
Popular vote	21,644	15,823
Percentage	57.8%	42.2%
- Precinct results Webb: 50-60% 60-70% 70-80% 100% Sharp: 50-60% Tie: 50%
Senator before election
Robin L. Webb
Democratic
Elected Senator
Robin L. Webb
Democratic

Incumbent senator Robin L. Webb won reelection, defeating primary and general election challengers.

=== Democratic primary ===
==== Candidates ====
===== Nominee =====
- Robin L. Webb, incumbent senator

===== Eliminated in primary =====
- Chester Chuck Highley

==== Results ====
Democratic primary results
Party	Candidate	Votes	%
Democratic	Robin L. Webb (incumbent)	10,543	86.7
Democratic	Chester Chuck Highley	1,623	13.3
Total votes		12,166	100.0

=== Republican primary ===
==== Candidates ====
===== Nominee =====
- Scott L. Sharp

=== General election ===
==== Results ====
Results by county: Webb: 50–60%; 60–70%

2018 Kentucky Senate 18th district election
Party	Candidate	Votes	%
Democratic	Robin L. Webb (incumbent)	21,644	57.8
Republican	Scott L. Sharp	15,823	42.2
Total votes		37,467	100.0
Democratic hold			

== District 20 ==
Incumbent senator Paul R. Hornback won reelection, defeating Democratic candidate Dave Suetholz.

=== Democratic primary ===
==== Candidates ====
===== Nominee =====
- Dave Suetholz

=== Republican primary ===
==== Candidates ====
===== Nominee =====
- Paul R. Hornback, incumbent senator

=== General election ===
==== Results ====
2018 Kentucky Senate 20th district election
Party	Candidate	Votes	%
Republican	Paul R. Hornback (incumbent)	25,775	56.5
Democratic	Dave Suetholz	19,829	43.5
Total votes		45,604	100.0
Republican hold			

== District 22 ==
Incumbent senator Tom Buford won reelection, defeating Democratic candidate Carolyn Dupont.

=== Democratic primary ===
==== Candidates ====
===== Nominee =====
- Carolyn Dupont

=== Republican primary ===
==== Candidates ====
===== Nominee =====
- Tom Buford, incumbent senator

=== General election ===
==== Results ====
2018 Kentucky Senate 22nd district election
Party	Candidate	Votes	%
Republican	Tom Buford (incumbent)	28,537	66.0
Democratic	Carolyn Dupont	14,692	34.0
Total votes		43,229	100.0
Republican hold			

== District 24 ==
Incumbent senator Wil Schroder won reelection, defeating Democratic candidate Rachel Roberts.

=== Democratic primary ===
==== Candidates ====
===== Nominee =====
- Rachel Roberts

=== Republican primary ===
==== Candidates ====
===== Nominee =====
- Wil Schroder, incumbent senator

=== General election ===
==== Results ====
Results by county: Schroder: 50–60%; 70–80%

2018 Kentucky Senate 24th district election
Party	Candidate	Votes	%
Republican	Wil Schroder (incumbent)	23,705	56.9
Democratic	Rachel Roberts	17,958	43.1
Total votes		41,663	100.0
Republican hold			

== District 26 ==
Incumbent senator Ernie Harris won reelection, defeating primary and general election challengers.

=== Democratic primary ===
==== Candidates ====
===== Nominee =====
- Karen Berg

===== Eliminated in primary =====
- Matt Kaufmann

==== Results ====
Democratic primary results
Party	Candidate	Votes	%
Democratic	Karen Berg	7,112	67.3
Democratic	Matt Kaufmann	3,451	32.7
Total votes		10,563	100.0

=== Republican primary ===
==== Candidates ====
===== Nominee =====
- Ernie Harris, incumbent senator

===== Eliminated in primary =====
- Alex R. White

==== Results ====
Republican primary results
Party	Candidate	Votes	%
Republican	Ernie Harris (incumbent)	5,193	52.2
Republican	Alex R. White	4,750	47.8
Total votes		9,943	100.0

=== General election ===
==== Results ====
2018 Kentucky Senate 26th district election
Party	Candidate	Votes	%
Republican	Ernie Harris (incumbent)	29,625	51.8
Democratic	Karen Berg	26,524	46.3
Independent	Jody Hurt	1,078	1.9
Total votes		57,227	100.0
Republican hold			

== District 28 ==
Incumbent senator Ralph Alvarado won reelection, defeating Democratic candidate Denise Gray.

=== Democratic primary ===
==== Candidates ====
===== Nominee =====
- Denise Gray

=== Republican primary ===
==== Candidates ====
===== Nominee =====
- Ralph Alvarado, incumbent senator

=== General election ===
==== Results ====
2018 Kentucky Senate 28th district election
Party	Candidate	Votes	%
Republican	Ralph Alvarado (incumbent)	23,212	53.4
Democratic	Denise Gray	20,291	46.6
Total votes		43,503	100.0
Republican hold			

== District 30 ==
Incumbent senator Brandon Smith won reelection, defeating Democratic candidate Paula Clemons-Combs.

=== Democratic primary ===
==== Candidates ====
===== Nominee =====
- Paula Clemons-Combs

=== Republican primary ===
==== Candidates ====
===== Nominee =====
- Brandon Smith, incumbent senator

=== General election ===
==== Results ====
Results by county: Smith: 60–70%; 70–80%; 80–90%; Clemons-Combs: 50–60%

2018 Kentucky Senate 30th district election
Party	Candidate	Votes	%
Republican	Brandon Smith (incumbent)	27,747	73.2
Democratic	Paula Clemons-Combs	10,151	26.8
Total votes		37,898	100.0
Republican hold			

== District 32 ==
Incumbent senator Mike Wilson won reelection, defeating primary and general election challengers.

=== Democratic primary ===
==== Candidates ====
===== Nominee =====
- Jeanie Smith

=== Republican primary ===
==== Candidates ====
===== Nominee =====
- Mike Wilson, incumbent senator

===== Eliminated in primary =====
- Darrell Traughber

==== Results ====
Republican primary results
Party	Candidate	Votes	%
Republican	Mike Wilson (incumbent)	4,877	60.8
Republican	Darrell Traughber	3,150	39.2
Total votes		8,027	100.0

=== General election ===
==== Results ====
2018 Kentucky Senate 32nd district election
Party	Candidate	Votes	%
Republican	Mike Wilson (incumbent)	20,803	52.3
Democratic	Jeanie Smith	18,952	47.7
Total votes		39,755	100.0
Republican hold			

== District 34 ==
Incumbent senator Jared K. Carpenter won reelection, defeating Democratic candidate Susan Byrne Haddix.

=== Democratic primary ===
==== Candidates ====
===== Nominee =====
- Susan Byrne Haddix

=== Republican primary ===
==== Candidates ====
===== Nominee =====
- Jared K. Carpenter, incumbent senator

=== General election ===
==== Results ====
2018 Kentucky Senate 34th district election
Party	Candidate	Votes	%
Republican	Jared K. Carpenter (incumbent)	28,145	61.8
Democratic	Susan Byrne Haddix	17,377	38.2
Total votes		45,522	100.0
Republican hold			

== District 36 ==
Incumbent senator Julie Raque Adams won reelection, defeating primary and general election challengers.

=== Democratic primary ===
==== Candidates ====
===== Nominee =====
- Sheri A. Donahue

===== Eliminated in primary =====
- Gay Adelmann

==== Results ====
Democratic primary results
Party	Candidate	Votes	%
Democratic	Sheri A. Donahue	5,694	56.2
Democratic	Gay Adelmann	4,442	43.8
Total votes		10,136	100.0

=== Republican primary ===
==== Candidates ====
===== Nominee =====
- Julie Raque Adams, incumbent senator

===== Eliminated in primary =====
- Sheeba Jolly

==== Results ====
Republican primary results
Party	Candidate	Votes	%
Republican	Julie Raque Adams (incumbent)	5,800	90.3
Republican	Sheeba Jolly	622	9.7
Total votes		6,422	100.0

=== General election ===
==== Results ====
2018 Kentucky Senate 36th district election
Party	Candidate	Votes	%
Republican	Julie Raque Adams (incumbent)	29,729	53.4
Democratic	Sheri A. Donahue	25,977	46.6
Total votes		55,706	100.0
Republican hold			

== District 38 ==
Incumbent senator Dan Malano Seum won reelection, defeating primary and general election challengers.

=== Republican primary ===
==== Candidates ====
===== Nominee =====
- Dan Malano Seum, incumbent senator

===== Eliminated in primary =====
- Paul Wesley Ham

==== Results ====
Republican primary results
Party	Candidate	Votes	%
Republican	Dan Malano Seum (incumbent)	3,712	57.1
Republican	Paul Wesley Ham	2,787	42.9
Total votes		6,499	100.0

=== General election ===
==== Results ====
2018 Kentucky Senate 38th district election
Party	Candidate	Votes	%
Republican	Dan Malano Seum (incumbent)	25,801	67.9
Independent	Brenda Sue "Susie" Board	9,868	26.0
Write-in	Andrew Bailey	2,329	6.1
Total votes		37,998	100.0
Republican hold			

== See also ==
- 2018 Kentucky elections
  - 2018 Kentucky House of Representatives election
  - 2018 United States House of Representatives elections in Kentucky
