= Kentucky's 2nd Senate district =

American legislative district

Kentucky's 2nd State Senate district
Senator
| Danny Carroll; R–Benton |
since January 1, 2015
- Registration: 46.9% Republican; 43.2% Democratic; 9.3% No party preference
- Demographics: 87.2% White; 6.0% Black; 2.7% Hispanic; 0.7% Asian; 0.1% Native American; 0.2% Other; 3.1% Multiracial
- Population (2023): 120,694
- Registered voters (2025): 103,431

Kentucky's 2nd Senatorial district is one of 38 districts in the Kentucky Senate. Located in the far west of the state, it comprises the counties of Ballard, Carlisle, Livingston, Marshall, and McCracken. It has been represented by Danny Carroll (R–Benton) since 2015. As of 2023, the district had a population of 120,694.

== Voter registration ==
On January 1, 2025, the district had 103,431 registered voters, who were registered with the following parties.

| Party | Registration | |
| Party | Voters | % |
|---|---|---|
| Republican | 48,547 | 46.94 |
| Democratic | 44,688 | 43.21 |
| Independent | 4,216 | 4.08 |
| Libertarian | 472 | 0.46 |
| Green | 78 | 0.08 |
| Constitution | 33 | 0.03 |
| Socialist Workers | 12 | 0.01 |
| Reform | 8 | 0.01 |
| "Other" | 5,377 | 5.20 |
| Total | 103,431 | 100.00 |
Source: Kentucky State Board of Elections

== Election results from statewide races ==
=== 2014 – 2020 ===
| Year | Office | Results (Note: Figures presented in this table are calculated by summing precinct election results published by the Kentucky State Board of Elections, using precinct data that list each precinct's senatorial district.) |
|---|---|---|
| 2014 | Senator | McConnell 61.8 - 35.5% |
| 2015 | Governor | Bevin 56.4 - 40.7% |
| 2015 | Secretary of State | Knipper 53.5 - 46.5% |
| 2015 | Attorney General | Westerfield 52.7 - 47.3% |
| 2015 | Auditor of Public Accounts | Harmon 55.9 - 44.1% |
| 2015 | State Treasurer | Ball 62.6 - 37.4% |
| 2015 | Commissioner of Agriculture | Quarles 64.6 - 35.4% |
| 2016 | President | Trump 70.1 - 25.7% |
| 2016 | Senator | Paul 63.9 - 36.1% |
| 2019 | Governor | Bevin 58.9 - 39.3% |
| 2019 | Secretary of State | Adams 64.0 - 36.0% |
| 2019 | Attorney General | Cameron 64.2 - 35.8% |
| 2019 | Auditor of Public Accounts | Harmon 62.4 - 34.2% |
| 2019 | State Treasurer | Ball 67.6 - 32.4% |
| 2019 | Commissioner of Agriculture | Quarles 65.1 - 32.2% |
| 2020 | President | Trump 70.0 - 28.5% |
| 2020 | Senator | McConnell 66.2 - 30.4% |
| 2020 | Amendment 1 | Yes 61.2 - 38.8% |
| 2020 | Amendment 2 | No 70.2 - 29.8% |

=== 2022 – present ===
| Year | Office | Results |
|---|---|---|
| 2022 | Senator | Paul 72.5 - 27.5% |
| 2022 | Amendment 1 | Yes 55.7 - 44.3% |
| 2022 | Amendment 2 | Yes 59.3 - 40.7% |
| 2023 | Governor | Cameron 57.2 - 42.8% |
| 2023 | Secretary of State | Adams 70.0 - 30.0% |
| 2023 | Attorney General | Coleman 67.7 - 32.3% |
| 2023 | Auditor of Public Accounts | Ball 70.2 - 29.8% |
| 2023 | State Treasurer | Metcalf 66.3 - 33.7% |
| 2023 | Commissioner of Agriculture | Shell 69.2 - 30.8% |
| 2024 | President | Trump 72.8 - 25.9% |
| 2024 | Amendment 1 | Yes 65.5 - 34.5% |
| 2024 | Amendment 2 | No 64.2 - 35.8% |

== List of members representing the district ==
| Member | Party | Years | Electoral history | District location |
|---|---|---|---|---|
| Tom Garrett (Paducah) | Democratic | January 1, 1962 – February 4, 1979 | Elected in 1961. Reelected in 1965. Reelected in 1969. Reelected in 1973. Reelected in 1977. Died. | 1944–1964; Ballard, Carlisle, Livingston, and McCracken Counties. |
| Tom Garrett (Paducah) | Democratic | January 1, 1962 – February 4, 1979 | Elected in 1961. Reelected in 1965. Reelected in 1969. Reelected in 1973. Reelected in 1977. Died. | 1964–1972 |
| Tom Garrett (Paducah) | Democratic | January 1, 1962 – February 4, 1979 | Elected in 1961. Reelected in 1965. Reelected in 1969. Reelected in 1973. Reelected in 1977. Died. | 1972–1974 |
| Tom Garrett (Paducah) | Democratic | January 1, 1962 – February 4, 1979 | Elected in 1961. Reelected in 1965. Reelected in 1969. Reelected in 1973. Reelected in 1977. Died. | 1974–1984 |
| Helen Garrett (Paducah) | Democratic | May 1979 – January 1, 1991 | Elected to finish her husband's term. Reelected in 1981. Reelected in 1986. Lost renomination. | 1974–1984 |
| Helen Garrett (Paducah) | Democratic | May 1979 – January 1, 1991 | Elected to finish her husband's term. Reelected in 1981. Reelected in 1986. Lost renomination. | 1984–1993; Ballard, Marshall, and McCracken Counties. |
| Bob Leeper (Paducah) | Democratic | January 1, 1991 – August 22, 1999 | Elected in 1990. Reelected in 1994. Reelected in 1998. Reelected in 2002. Reelected in 2006. Reelected in 2010. Retired to run for Judge/Executive of McCracken County. | 1984–1993; Ballard, Marshall, and McCracken Counties. |
| Bob Leeper (Paducah) | Democratic | January 1, 1991 – August 22, 1999 | Elected in 1990. Reelected in 1994. Reelected in 1998. Reelected in 2002. Reelected in 2006. Reelected in 2010. Retired to run for Judge/Executive of McCracken County. | 1993–1997 |
| Bob Leeper (Paducah) | Democratic | January 1, 1991 – August 22, 1999 | Elected in 1990. Reelected in 1994. Reelected in 1998. Reelected in 2002. Reelected in 2006. Reelected in 2010. Retired to run for Judge/Executive of McCracken County. | 1997–2003 |
| Bob Leeper (Paducah) | Republican | August 22, 1999 – January 11, 2005 | Elected in 1990. Reelected in 1994. Reelected in 1998. Reelected in 2002. Reelected in 2006. Reelected in 2010. Retired to run for Judge/Executive of McCracken County. | 1997–2003 |
| Bob Leeper (Paducah) | Republican | August 22, 1999 – January 11, 2005 | Elected in 1990. Reelected in 1994. Reelected in 1998. Reelected in 2002. Reelected in 2006. Reelected in 2010. Retired to run for Judge/Executive of McCracken County. | 2003–2015 |
| Bob Leeper (Paducah) | Independent | January 11, 2005 – January 1, 2015 | Elected in 1990. Reelected in 1994. Reelected in 1998. Reelected in 2002. Reelected in 2006. Reelected in 2010. Retired to run for Judge/Executive of McCracken County. | 2003–2015 |
| Danny Carroll (Benton) | Republican | January 1, 2015 – present | Elected in 2014. Reelected in 2018. Reelected in 2022. Reelected in 2026. | 2015–2023 |
| Danny Carroll (Benton) | Republican | January 1, 2015 – present | Elected in 2014. Reelected in 2018. Reelected in 2022. Reelected in 2026. | 2023–present |
