= Kentucky's 32nd Senate district =

American legislative district

Kentucky's 32nd State Senate district
Senator
Mike Wilson; R–Bowling Green
since January 1, 2011
- Registration: 47.9% Republican; 40.8% Democratic; 10.6% No party preference
- Demographics: 81.9% White; 5.6% Black; 4.7% Hispanic; 3.2% Asian; 0.1% Native American; 0.4% Hawaiian/Pacific Islander; 0.2% Other; 3.9% Multiracial
- Population (2023): 128,080
- Registered voters (2025): 91,521

Kentucky's 32nd Senatorial district is one of 38 districts in the Kentucky Senate. Located in the southern part of the state, it comprises the counties of Logan, Simpson, Todd, and part of Warren. It has been represented by Mike Wilson (R–Bowling Green) since 2011. As of 2023, the district had a population of 128,080.

== Voter registration ==
On January 1, 2025, the district had 91,521 registered voters, who were registered with the following parties.

Party	Registration	
Party	Voters	%
Republican	43,854	47.92
Democratic	37,343	40.80
Independent	4,488	4.90
Libertarian	514	0.56
Green	75	0.08
Constitution	53	0.06
Socialist Workers	12	0.01
Reform	5	0.01
"Other"	5,177	5.66
Total	91,521	100.00
Source: Kentucky State Board of Elections

== Election results from statewide races ==
=== 2014 – 2020 ===
Year	Office	Results (Note: Figures presented in this table are calculated by summing precinct election results published by the Kentucky State Board of Elections, using precinct data that list each precinct's senatorial district.)
2014	Senator	McConnell 58.7 - 38.2%
2015	Governor	Bevin 55.2 - 41.6%
2015	Secretary of State	Knipper 52.5 - 47.5%
2015	Attorney General	Westerfield 52.7 - 47.3%
2015	Auditor of Public Accounts	Harmon 57.3 - 42.7%
2015	State Treasurer	Ball 65.5 - 34.5%
2015	Commissioner of Agriculture	Quarles 63.6 - 36.4%
2016	President	Trump 59.2 - 35.0%
2016	Senator	Paul 60.3 - 39.7%
2019	Governor	Beshear 50.8 - 47.6%
2019	Secretary of State	Adams 54.3 - 45.7%
2019	Attorney General	Cameron 56.5 - 43.5%
2019	Auditor of Public Accounts	Harmon 54.8 - 41.7%
2019	State Treasurer	Ball 61.4 - 38.6%
2019	Commissioner of Agriculture	Quarles 57.8 - 39.0%
2020	President	Trump 57.4 - 40.6%
2020	Senator	McConnell 53.6 - 42.1%
2020	Amendment 1	Yes 64.3 - 35.7%
2020	Amendment 2	No 66.7 - 33.3%

=== 2022 – present ===
Year	Office	Results
2022	Senator	Paul 66.8 - 33.2%
2022	Amendment 1	Yes 53.1 - 46.9%
2022	Amendment 2	Yes 53.0 - 47.0%
2023	Governor	Cameron 55.1 - 44.9%
2023	Secretary of State	Adams 66.1 - 33.9%
2023	Attorney General	Coleman 63.9 - 36.1%
2023	Auditor of Public Accounts	Ball 66.3 - 33.7%
2023	State Treasurer	Metcalf 63.5 - 36.5%
2023	Commissioner of Agriculture	Shell 66.0 - 34.0%
2024	President	Trump 68.6 - 29.9%
2024	Amendment 1	Yes 64.9 - 35.1%
2024	Amendment 2	No 64.8 - 35.2%

== List of members representing the district ==
Member	Party	Years	Electoral history	District location
Ray B. White (Bowling Green)	Republican	January 1, 1970 – January 1, 1974	Elected in 1969. Retired.	1964–1972
Ray B. White (Bowling Green)	Republican	January 1, 1970 – January 1, 1974	Elected in 1969. Retired.	1972–1974
Frank Miller (Bowling Green)	Democratic	January 1, 1974 – January 1, 1987	Elected in 1973. Reelected in 1977. Reelected in 1981. Lost renomination.	1974–1984
Frank Miller (Bowling Green)	Democratic	January 1, 1974 – January 1, 1987	Elected in 1973. Reelected in 1977. Reelected in 1981. Lost renomination.	1984–1993; Logan and Warren Counties.
Nicholas Kafoglis (Bowling Green)	Democratic	January 1, 1987 – January 1, 1999	Elected in 1986. Reelected in 1990. Reelected in 1994. Retired.	1984–1993; Logan and Warren Counties.
Nicholas Kafoglis (Bowling Green)	Democratic	January 1, 1987 – January 1, 1999	Elected in 1986. Reelected in 1990. Reelected in 1994. Retired.	1993–1997
Nicholas Kafoglis (Bowling Green)	Democratic	January 1, 1987 – January 1, 1999	Elected in 1986. Reelected in 1990. Reelected in 1994. Retired.	1997–2003
Brett Guthrie (Bowling Green)	Republican	January 1, 1999 – January 6, 2009	Elected in 1998. Reelected in 2002. Reelected in 2006. Resigned after being elected to Kentucky's 2nd congressional district.	1997–2003
Brett Guthrie (Bowling Green)	Republican	January 1, 1999 – January 6, 2009	Elected in 1998. Reelected in 2002. Reelected in 2006. Resigned after being elected to Kentucky's 2nd congressional district.	2003–2015
Mike Reynolds (Bowling Green)	Democratic	February 17, 2009 – January 1, 2011	Elected to finish Guthrie's term. Lost reelection.	2003–2015
Mike Wilson (Bowling Green)	Republican	January 1, 2011 – present	Elected in 2010. Reelected in 2014. Reelected in 2018. Reelected in 2022. Reelected in 2026.	2003–2015
Mike Wilson (Bowling Green)	Republican	January 1, 2011 – present	Elected in 2010. Reelected in 2014. Reelected in 2018. Reelected in 2022. Reelected in 2026.	2015–2023
Mike Wilson (Bowling Green)	Republican	January 1, 2011 – present	Elected in 2010. Reelected in 2014. Reelected in 2018. Reelected in 2022. Reelected in 2026.	2023–present
