= Don Pasley =

American politician

Member of the Kentucky House of Representatives from the 73rd district
- In office November 2001 – January 1, 2011
- Preceded by: R. J. Palmer
- Succeeded by: Donna Mayfield

Personal details
- Born: October 26, 1961 (age 64) Winchester, Kentucky, U.S.
- Party: Democratic
- Spouse: Teresa
- Children: 1

Don Pasley (born October 26, 1961) is an American politician from Kentucky who was a member of the Kentucky House of Representatives from 2001 to 2011. Pasley was first elected in a November 2001 special election after incumbent representative R. J. Palmer resigned following his election to the Kentucky Senate. He was defeated for reelection in 2010 by Republican Donna Mayfield.
