= Dan Kelly (politician) =

American politician

Majority Leader of the Kentucky Senate
- In office October 26, 1999 – c. October 7, 2009
- Whip: Elizabeth Tori; Dan Seum; Carroll Gibson
- Preceded by: David Karem
- Succeeded by: Robert Stivers

Minority Leader of the Kentucky Senate
- In office November 12, 1994 – January 5, 1999
- Preceded by: John D. Rogers
- Succeeded by: David Williams

Member of the Kentucky Senate from the 14th district
- In office January 1, 1991 – October 26, 2009
- Preceded by: Ed O'Daniel
- Succeeded by: Jimmy Higdon

Personal details
- Born: 1950 (age 75–76)
- Party: Republican

Dan Kelly (born 1950) is an American politician from Kentucky who was a member of the Kentucky Senate from 1991 to 2009. Kelly was first elected in 1990, defeating incumbent Democratic senator Ed O'Daniel. He resigned from the senate in October 2009, having been appointed to the 11th Kentucky Circuit Court by governor Steve Beshear.
