= Dennis Parrett =

American politician (1959–2026)

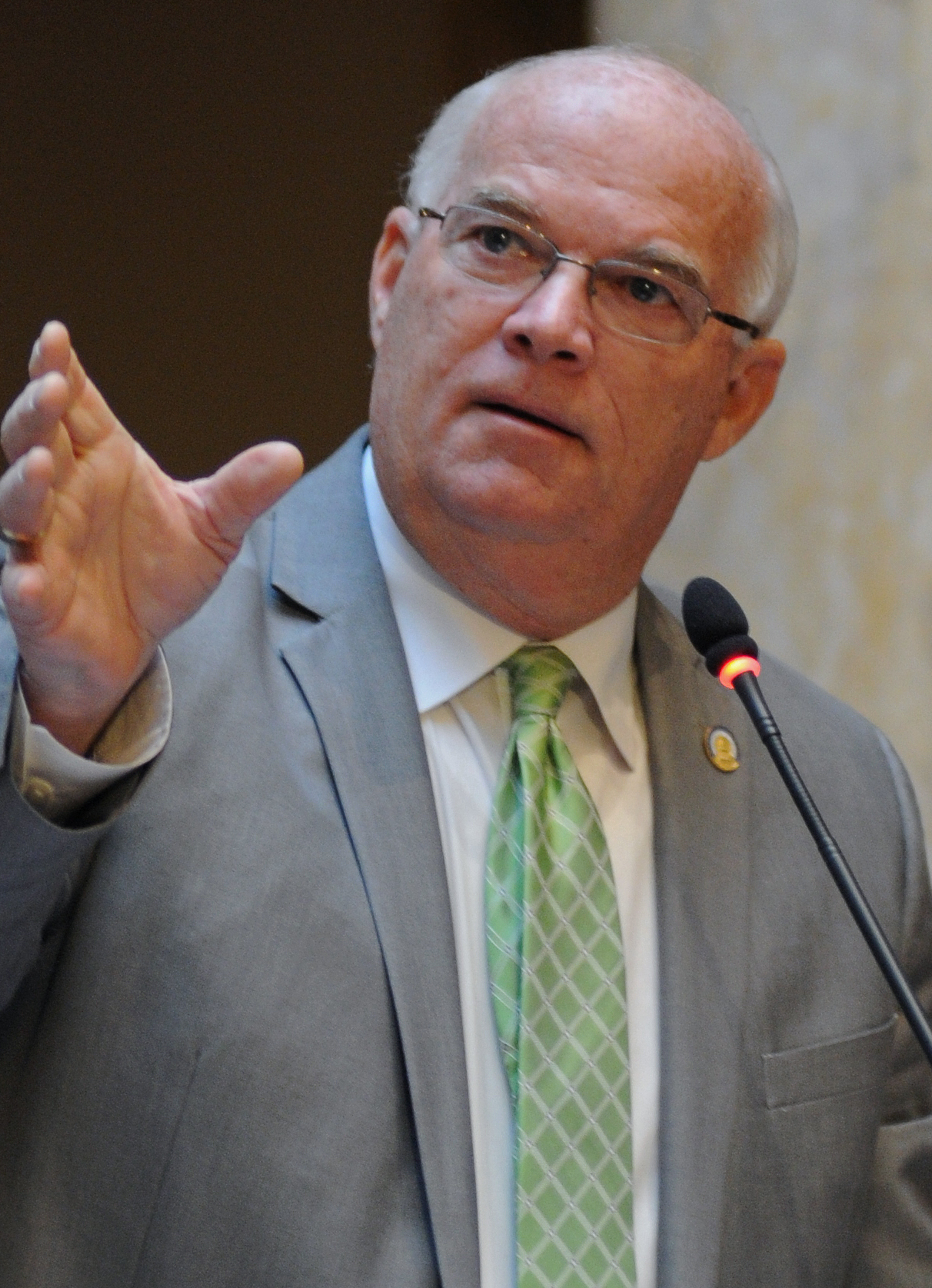
- Parrett in 2019

Minority Whip of the Kentucky Senate
- In office August 23, 2017 – January 1, 2023
- Preceded by: Julian Carroll
- Succeeded by: David Yates

Member of the Kentucky Senate from the 10th district
- In office January 1, 2011 – January 1, 2023
- Preceded by: Elizabeth Tori
- Succeeded by: Matthew Deneen

Personal details
- Born: October 30, 1959
- Died: June 7, 2026 (aged 66)
- Party: Democratic
- Education: University of Kentucky

Dennis L. Parrett (October 30, 1959 – June 7, 2026) was an American politician who served as a member of the Kentucky Senate from 2011 to 2023. A member of the Democratic Party, Parrett represented Kentucky's 10th Senate district, which included Hardin County as well as part of Jefferson County. From 2017 until his retirement in 2023, Parrett served as minority whip.

== Early life and education ==
Parrett lived in Elizabethtown, Kentucky, and graduated from West Hardin High School in 1977. He went on to attend the University of Kentucky, where he graduated with a Bachelor of Science degree in agricultural economics in 1981. Afterwards, he worked as an agricultural extension agent serving Hardin and Nelson counties, and later served in leadership roles at Southern States Cooperative and as co-owner of Cecilia Farm Services. From 2002 to 2020, Parrett operated a crop insurance agency which he had founded.

== Political career ==
In 2010, Parrett was unopposed for the Democratic nomination for Kentucky's 10th Senate district, and won the general election that November, unseating incumbent Republican senator Elizabeth Tori. He was subsequently reelected in 2014 and 2018.

In 2015, Parrett considered running for commissioner of agriculture, but ultimately decided against it.

During the 2017 Kentucky General Assembly, Parrett alongside senator Danny Carroll established the sunny page program in honor of their daughters with special needs, which gives special needs children the opportunity to serve as a senate legislative page. In August of that year, Parrett was elected minority whip by the Senate Democratic caucus following their removal of senator and former governor Julian Carroll from the position for allegations of sexual harassment. Parrett remained as whip until his retirement in 2023.

== Personal life and death ==
Parrett resided in Elizabethtown alongside his wife, Lisa. The couple had three daughters together, the youngest of whom has special needs.

Parrett died on June 7, 2026, at the age of 66, following a long-term fight with dementia.
