= Jimmy Higdon =

Kentucky politician

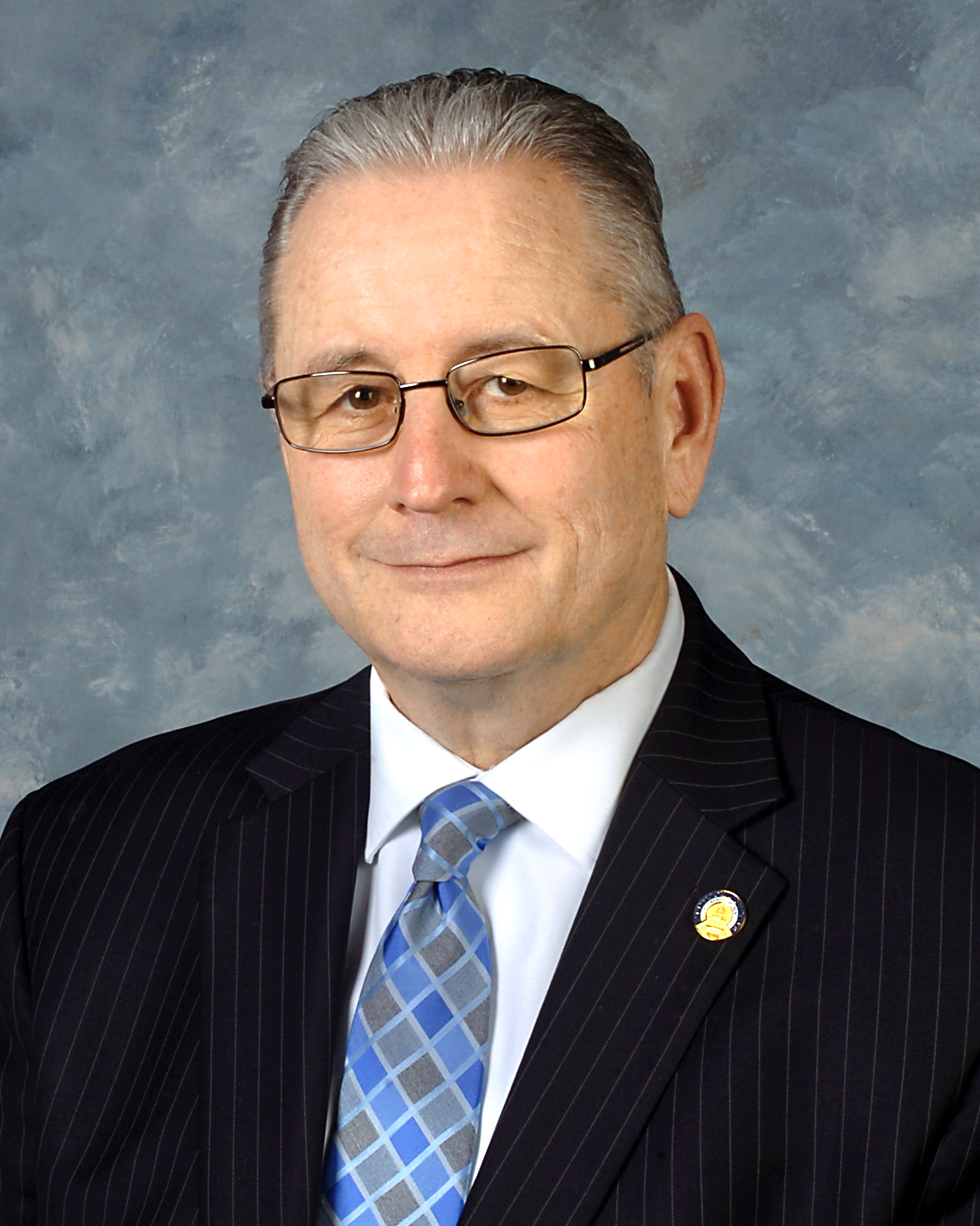
- Official Portrait, 2016

President pro tempore of the Kentucky Senate
- In office January 2, 2018 – January 8, 2019
- Preceded by: David P. Givens
- Succeeded by: David P. Givens

Majority Whip of the Kentucky Senate
- In office January 6, 2015 – January 2, 2018
- Preceded by: Brandon Smith
- Succeeded by: Mike Wilson

Member of the Kentucky Senate from the 14th district
- Incumbent
- Assumed office December 16, 2009
- Preceded by: Dan Kelly
- Succeeded by: Ben Mudd (elect)

Member of the Kentucky House of Representatives from the 24th district
- In office January 1, 2003 – December 16, 2009
- Preceded by: William Scott
- Succeeded by: Terry Mills

Personal details
- Born: July 15, 1953 (age 73)
- Party: Republican
- Education: Morehead State University (BS)

James Cecil Higdon Jr. (born July 15, 1953) is an American politician who has served as a member of the Kentucky Senate since 2009. A member of the Republican Party, Higdon represents the Kentucky's 14th Senate district, which includes LaRue, Marion, Nelson, Spencer, and Washington counties. He currently serves as the chair of the senate transportation committee. Higdon did not run for reelection in 2026.

Higdon was previously a member of the Kentucky House of Representatives from 2003 to 2009.

== Biography ==
James Cecil Higdon Jr. was born on July 15, 1953, in Lebanon, Kentucky to Cecil and Alice Higdon. He graduated from Marion County High School in 1971, and from Morehead State University in 1975, earning a Bachelor of Science in industrial technology. He then served in the United States Army Reserve from 1976 to 1984.

In 1976, Higdon returned to Lebanon and became a partner in the Key Market grocery store, which was later renamed Higdon's Foodtown. The store closed in January 2011 following three consecutive years of losses. He noted that, “independent grocers are like dinosaurs, there's a few less every year.”

=== Political career ===
Higdon was first elected to the house in 2002 following the retirement of incumbent Democratic representative William Scott. He was elected to the 24th district, (Note: At the time, the 24th district comprised Casey, Marion, and part of Pulaski Counties.) defeating Democratic candidate Connie Sue Rakes with 51.1 percent of the vote. He was reelected to the house in 2004, 2006, and 2008.

On December 8, 2009, Higdon won a special election to Kentucky's 14th Senate district, which had been vacated by the resignation of senator Dan Kelly. The election, held while Republicans maintained a slim majority in the chamber, (Note: Following Kelly’s resignation, the membership of the Senate was 19 Republicans, 17 Democrats, and one independent who caused with the Republicans.) was described by the Lexington Herald-Leader as a “closely watched race” with “much at stake.” Higdon ultimately received 56.1 percent of the vote, defeating former Democratic representative Jodie Haydon. He took the oath of office on December 16. He was subsequently reelected to full four-year terms in 2010, 2014, 2018, and 2022.

Higdon has described himself as “pro-life and pro-Second Amendment.” In 2022, he received an A+ rating and the endorsement of the NRA Political Victory Fund.

Higdon served as chair of the Senate Veterans, Military Affairs, and Public Protection Committee during the 2013 and 2014 legislative sessions. In 2015, he was chosen by his Republican colleagues as the caucus's majority whip, a role he continued until his election as president pro tempore in 2018. Since the 2021 session, He has served as chair of the Senate Transportation Committee.

In 2011, Higdon introduced legislation to allow voters registered as independents to vote in primary elections. Higdon argued that independents, as taxpayers, "help pay for elections, so they should be able to vote," and that "the first political party that voluntarily opens up its primary will enjoy an unfair advantage during the general election." The bill (SB 41) passed the senate in a 23 to 13 to vote, but was not approved by the house before the legislative session adjourned.

During his campaign Higdon opposed the generous pensions from which these senators benefit and vowed to try to repeal the higher pensions after he took office.

In 2011, Senator Higdon called for tighter state regulations to prevent physicians from establishing temporary clinics from which they issue prescriptions to drug abusers. A "pain clinic" of this kind opened in Lebanon in 2010, but citizens complained of van-loads of people waiting in the parking lot to purchase prescriptions. As police began to investigate, the clinic abruptly closed; the doctor was since found with another such operation in Lexington, Kentucky. Many pain clinics are legal, but others have been questioned as "pill mills".

Higdon retired at the 2026 Kentucky Senate election.

== Personal life ==
Higdon and his wife Jane have a son, James III; and a daughter, Brittany. He is a Roman Catholic.

== Electoral history ==
Electoral history of Kevin Kiley
Year	Office	Primary			General			Result	Swing	Ref.
Year	Office	Total	%	P.	Total	%	P.	Result	Swing	Ref.
2002	Kentucky House of Representatives (24th)	Unopposed			5,911	51.10%	1st	Won	Gain	
2004	Kentucky House of Representatives (24th)	Unopposed			10,806	Unopposed		Won	Hold	
2006	Kentucky House of Representatives (24th)	Unopposed			8,533	Unopposed		Won	Hold	
2008	Kentucky House of Representatives (24th)	2,285	81.46%	1st	12,551	Unopposed		Won	Hold	
2009 sp	Kentucky Senate (14th)	N/A			11,327	56.05%	1st	Won	Hold	
2010	Kentucky Senate (14th)	Unopposed			30,360	Unopposed		Won	Hold	
2014	Kentucky Senate (14th)	Unopposed			31,413	Unopposed		Won	Hold	
2018	Kentucky Senate (14th)	Unopposed			29,752	65.25%	1st	Won	Hold	
2022	Kentucky Senate (14th)	Unopposed			33,142	Unopposed		Won	Hold	

== Notes ==
Kentucky House of Representatives
Preceded by William Scott	Member of the Kentucky House of Representatives from the 24th district 2003–2009	Succeeded by Terry Mills
Kentucky Senate
Preceded by Dan Kelly	Member of the Kentucky Senate from the 14th district 2009–present	Incumbent
Preceded by David P. Givens	President pro tempore of the Kentucky Senate; 2018–2019	Succeeded by David P. Givens
