= Helen Garrett =

American politician

Member of the Kentucky Senate from the 2nd district
- In office May 1979 – January 1, 1991
- Preceded by: Tom Garrett
- Succeeded by: Bob Leeper

Personal details
- Born: May 20, 1929 Paducah, Kentucky, US
- Died: October 26, 2006 (aged 77) Paducah, Kentucky, US
- Party: Democratic

Helen Marie Garrett (née Rickman; May 20, 1929 – October 26, 2006) was an American politician who served in the Kentucky Senate from the 2nd district from 1979 to 1991.

== Operation Boptrot ==
Helen R. Garrett was charged in 1992 with taking a $2,000 bribe from a horse racing track in exchange for helping pass favorable legislation in an FBI Operation called Boptrot. She pled guilty and received four years of probation.
