= Karen Berg (politician) =

American physician and politician

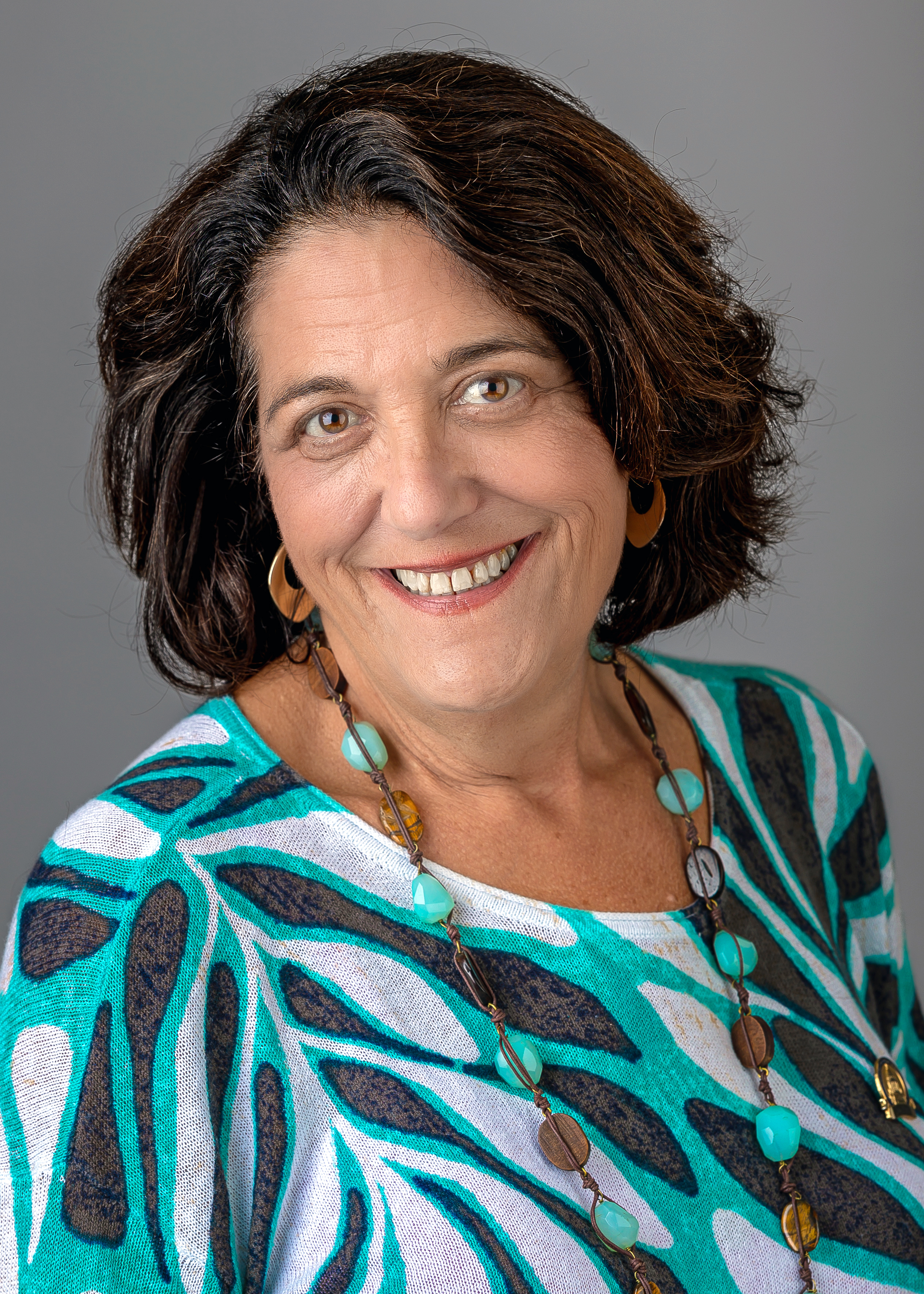
- Official portrait, 2025

Member of the Kentucky Senate from the 26th district
- Incumbent
- Assumed office July 13, 2020
- Preceded by: Ernie Harris

Personal details
- Born: Karen Aviva Berg; December 30, 1961 (age 64) Louisville, Kentucky, U.S.
- Party: Democratic
- Spouse: Bob Brousseau
- Children: 2, including Henry
- Education: University of Kentucky (BA); University of Louisville (MD)

Karen A. Berg (born December 30, 1961) is an American politician, physician, and former educator who currently serves as a member of the Kentucky Senate, representing the 26th district since 2020. A member of the Democratic Party, she is the only Jewish member of the Kentucky State Senate.

Born and raised in Louisville, Berg graduated from the University of Kentucky with her bachelor's degree and earned her Doctor of Medicine from the University of Louisville in 1987. She worked as a diagnostic radiologist and was an assistant professor at the University of Louisville until her election to the state senate. In June 2020, Berg won a special election to succeed Ernie Harris, flipping a seat held by the Republican Party for over 25 years. During her tenure in the Kentucky Senate, Berg has received international media attention for her support of transgender rights.

== Early life ==
Berg was born and raised in Kentucky. Her father, Dr. Harold Berg, was an artist and World War II veteran who served as a surgeon in the Pacific theater before returning to Louisville, Kentucky, to complete his medical education.

After graduating from Central High School, Berg attended the University of Kentucky where she earned her Bachelor of Arts, and the University of Louisville, where she earned a Doctor of Medicine in 1987.

== Career ==
Berg spent her career as a diagnostic radiologist, and assistant professor in the Department of Radiology at the University of Louisville.

Berg ran for the Kentucky State Senate in 2018, losing the seat to incumbent Ernie Harris. She won the seat in a special election in June 2020 after Harris announced his retirement. This was the first time in 25 years that the seat was won by a Democrat. She is the only Jewish member of the Kentucky State Senate.

Berg is a member of the Kentucky Antisemitism Task Force started by Governor Andy Beshear on December 21, 2023. The task force was founded as a response to bomb threats across the United States that targeted many locations including Kentucky synagogues.The task force is also responsible for revising training for law enforcement and Holocaust curriculum in Kentucky public middle and high schools.

=== Controversy ===
During the 2024 Kentucky General Assembly, Berg gained international media attention following comments she made during a committee debate regarding a bill to criminalize child sex dolls. Berg seemingly defended their use by saying, "There are what they call MAPs — minor-attracted persons — and the limited amount of research that’s done on these dolls suggests that they actually, for people who are attracted to minors, that these dolls actually decrease their proclivity to go out and attack children... that it actually gives them a release that makes them less likely to go outside of their home."

Berg's comments quickly went viral online, and were criticized by Governor Beshear. Berg later apologized, and voted in favor of the bill.

== Committee membership ==
=== Senate Standing Committees ===
- Veterans, Military Affairs, & Public Protection (S) (Member)
- Transportation (S) (Member)
- BR Sub. on Health & Family Services (S) (Liaison Member)
- Judiciary (S) (Member)
- Health Services (S) (Member)

=== Interim Joint Committees ===
- Judiciary (Member)
- Veterans, Military Affairs, & Public Protection (Member)
- Transportation (Member)
- Health Services (Member)
- BR Sub on Health & Family Services (Liaison Member)

=== Statutory Committees ===
- Commission on Race & Access to Opportunity (Member)
- Medicaid Oversight and Advisory Board (Member)

=== Caucuses ===
- Women's Caucus (Member)
- Bourbon Trail Caucus (Member)
- Louisville Metropolitan Caucus (Member)
- Kentucky Nonprofit Caucus (Member)

== Personal life ==
Berg was married to Bob Brousseau; they had two children, Rachel and Henry. Her son, Henry, was a transgender rights advocate who worked as a deputy press secretary for the Human Rights Campaign. In 2015, at 16 years old, he testified against a bathroom bill in the Kentucky state legislature. He died by suicide at the age of 24 on December 16, 2022.
