= Ray Jones II =

American politician

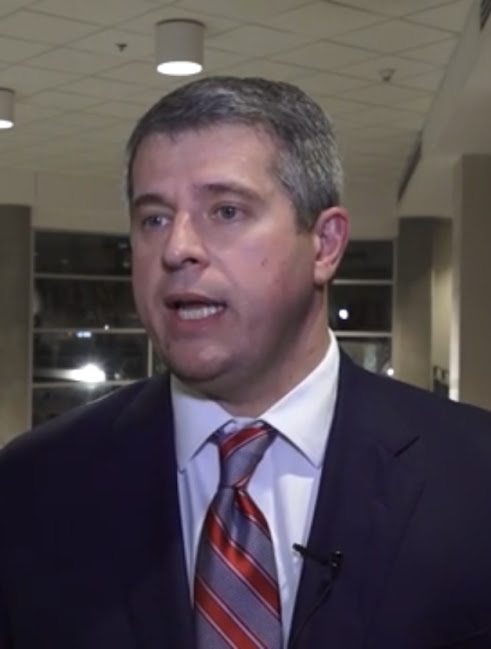
- Jones in 2018

Judge/Executive of Pike County
- Incumbent
- Assumed office January 7, 2019
- Preceded by: Bill Deskins

Minority Leader of the Kentucky Senate
- In office January 6, 2015 – January 7, 2019
- Preceded by: R. J. Palmer
- Succeeded by: Morgan McGarvey

Member of the Kentucky Senate from the 31st district
- In office January 1, 2001 – January 7, 2019
- Preceded by: Gary C. Johnson
- Succeeded by: Phillip Wheeler

Personal details
- Born: October 6, 1969 (age 56) Whitesburg, Kentucky, U.S.
- Party: Democratic
- Spouse: Paula Ashby
- Education: Eastern Kentucky University (BA); University of Louisville (JD)

Ray Stanley Jones II (born October 6, 1969) is an American attorney and politician who has served as judge/executive of Pike County, Kentucky since January 2019. He previously served as a Democratic member of the Kentucky Senate, representing Kentucky's 31st Senate district from 2001 to 2019. During his senate tenure, he served as minority leader from 2015 to 2019.

== Early life and education ==
Jones was born in Whitesburg, Kentucky in 1969. He earned a Bachelor of Arts degree from Eastern Kentucky University in 1991, and a Juris Doctor degree from the University of Louisville School of Law in 1994.

== Career ==
Jones was first elected to the Kentucky Senate in 2000 for a term starting in 2001. Jones served on the Appropriations and Revenue, Transportation, Natural Resources and Energy, and Judiciary committees. In 2018, Jones ran for and won the position of Pike County judge/executive, replacing the outgoing incumbent Bill Deskins. He was sworn in on January 6, 2019, and assumed office the following day.

On November 4, 2025, Jones stated that he would not seek re-election to a third term.

Kentucky Senate
Preceded by R. J. Palmer	Minority Leader of the Kentucky Senate; 2015–2019	Succeeded by Morgan McGarvey
