= Elizabeth Tori =

American politician (1936–2024)

Majority Whip of the Kentucky Senate
- In office October 26, 1999 – January 4, 2005
- Preceded by: Walter Blevins
- Succeeded by: Dan Seum

Minority Whip of the Kentucky Senate
- In office January 7, 1997 – August 22, 1999
- Preceded by: Dick Roeding
- Succeeded by: Marshall Long

Member of the Kentucky Senate from the 10th district
- In office January 1, 1995 – January 1, 2011
- Preceded by: Tom Smith
- Succeeded by: Dennis Parrett

Personal details
- Born: March 2, 1936
- Died: October 2, 2024 (aged 88)
- Party: Republican

Elizabeth Tori (March 2, 1936 – October 2, 2024) was an American politician of the Republican Party. Tori represented the 10th state Senate district of Kentucky from 1995 until 2011.

Tori attended the University of Kentucky and Western Kentucky University. Tori began her political activism with the creation of the North Hardin Republican Women's Club. Tori was also active in the congressional campaigns of her late husband, Martin, who ran for Kentucky's 2nd district U.S. House seat in 1988 and 1990.

Tori made her first run for political office in 1992 with a failed bid for the Radcliff, Kentucky City Council. Two years later, Tori filed for the 10th district state Senate seat held by Democratic incumbent Tom Smith. Using the slogan "the man for the job is a woman", Tori ran a hard campaign that focused on veterans' issues, a highly appealing topic to the district that includes Fort Knox. Tori defeated Smith on election night, becoming the first woman and first Republican to represent the district.

Tori was elected Senate Minority Whip in 1997. Tori earned a second term when she defeated Hardin County, Kentucky Magistrate Charles E. Wise by a wide margin in 1998. When the Republican Party gained control of the Kentucky Senate in January 2000, Tori was elevated to Majority Whip, making her the highest ranking woman in the legislature. In 2002, Tori defeated activist Janey Fair in the general election to win a third term. Following the 2004 election, Tori stepped down from her party leadership position to take the chairmanship of the Senate Veterans' Affairs Committee. On November 7, 2006, Tori won a fourth term in the Kentucky State Senate by defeating Hardin County Magistrate Doug Goodman by a wide margin.

In 2010, Tori narrowly lost a bid for a fifth term to Dennis Parrett, who used a series of questionable attack ads that painted Tori negatively, including an ad that accused her of taking $505,000 from state government, though that was the total of her legislator salary for the previous 16 years.

Tori died on October 2, 2024.
