= Julie Denton =

American politician (born 1960)

Julie Carman Denton

Member of the Louisville Metro Council from the 19th District
- In office January 5, 2015 – January 2019
- Preceded by: Jerry T. Miller
- Succeeded by: Anthony Piagentini

Member of the Kentucky Senate from the 36th district
- In office January 1, 1995 – January 1, 2015
- Preceded by: Susan Johns
- Succeeded by: Julie Raque Adams

Personal details
- Born: June 16, 1960 (age 66)
- Party: Republican

Julie Carman Denton (born June 16, 1960; formerly Julie Carman Rose) is a former member of the Kentucky Senate. She represented the 36th senate district from 1995 to 2015 as a Republican. She succeeded Democrat Susan Johns, who had previously been the only woman in the state senate. Denton was noted to be pro-life. In 2000, she was the co-chair of the Kentucky Senate's Brain Injury Task Force. For chair assignments after 2009, she chaired the Health and Welfare Committee and co-chaired the Banking and Insurance Committee during the 2011/2012 legislative session. In the 2013-2014 legislative session, she chaired the Health and Welfare Committee again. In 2015, she was elected to the city council of Louisville, Kentucky, but did not seek re-election in 2018.

Denton was born in Louisville, Kentucky, on June 16, 1960, and attended Asbury University from 1977 to 1979 before transferring to the University of Louisville, where she graduated with a Bachelor of Science in dental hygiene in 1981. After graduation, she worked as a dental hygienist until 2002 and as a consumer representative for General Electric from 1983 to 1986, while founding CPMC Corrections (a prison inmate phone call service) in 1986 and owning it until 2002. In 2012, she worked as the Vice President of Operations for Family Scholar House. In 2013, she began working in real estate with RE/MAX and, in 2015, became president of her own lobbying group. Denton is married and has four children.
