= Mike Reynolds (Kentucky politician) =

American politician

Member of the Kentucky Senate from the 32nd district
- In office February 17, 2009 – January 1, 2011
- Preceded by: Brett Guthrie
- Succeeded by: Mike Wilson

Personal details
- Party: Democratic

Mike Reynolds (born October 23, 1947) is an American politician from Kentucky who was a member of the Kentucky Senate from 2009 to 2011. Reynolds was elected in a February 2009 special election following the resignation of incumbent senator Brett Guthrie. He was defeated for reelection for a full term in 2010 by Republican Mike Wilson.
