= Brett Guthrie =

American politician (born 1964)

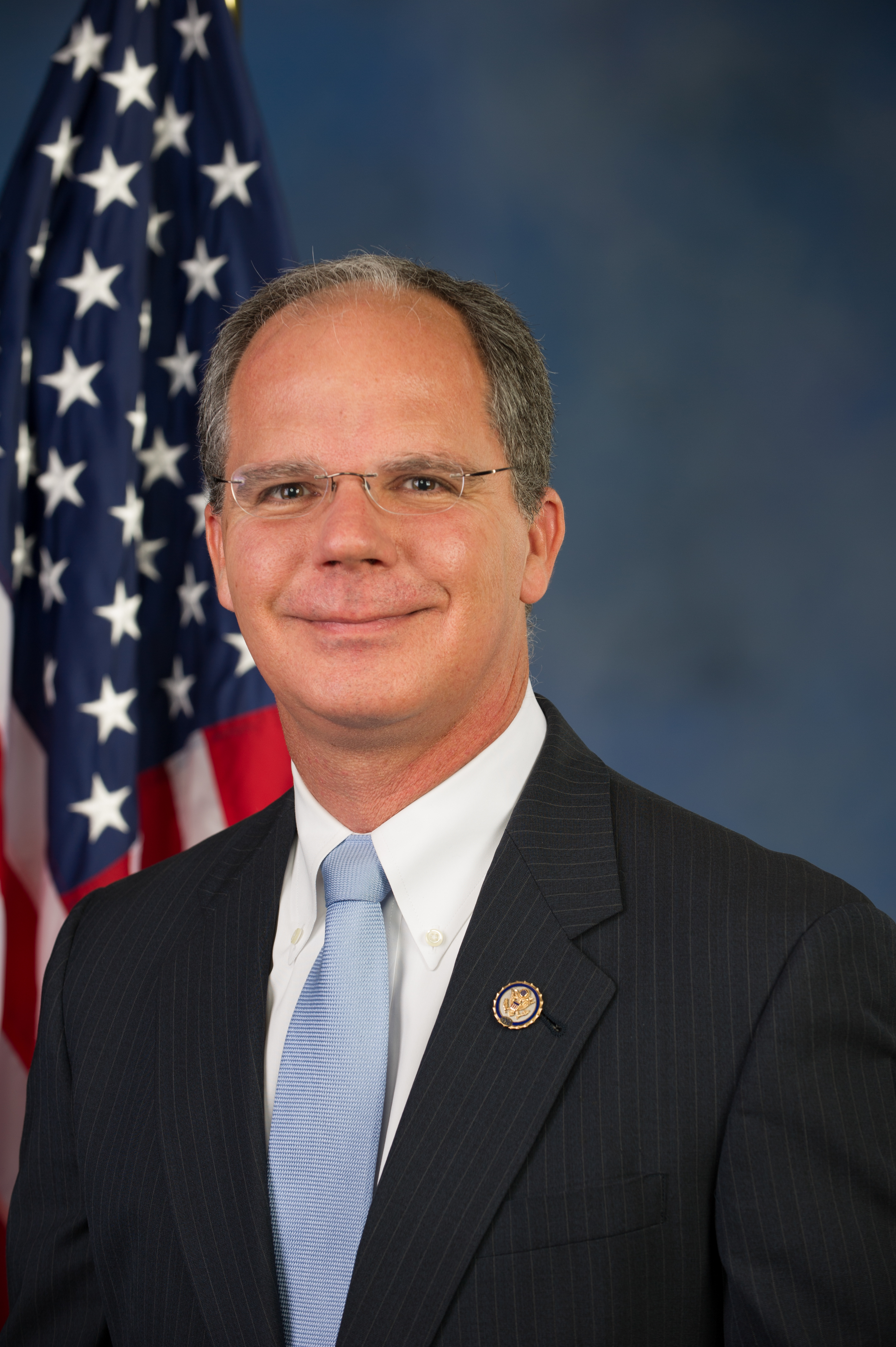
- Official portrait, 2012

Chair of the House Energy and Commerce Committee
- Incumbent
- Assumed office January 3, 2025
- Preceded by: Cathy McMorris Rodgers

Member of the U.S. House of Representatives from Kentucky's 2nd district
- Incumbent
- Assumed office January 3, 2009
- Preceded by: Ron Lewis

Member of the Kentucky Senate from the 32nd district
- In office January 1, 1999 – January 6, 2009
- Preceded by: Nicholas Kafoglis
- Succeeded by: Mike Reynolds

Personal details
- Born: Steven Brett Guthrie; February 18, 1964 (age 62) Florence, Alabama, U.S.
- Party: Republican
- Spouse: Beth Clemmons
- Children: 3
- Education: United States Military Academy (BS); Yale University (MBA)
- Website: House website Campaign website

Military service
- Branch/service: United States Army
- Years of service: 1987–1990
- Rank: Captain
- Unit: 101st Airborne Division
- Guthrie's voice Guthrie supporting the CARES Act. Recorded March 27, 2020

Steven Brett Guthrie (born February 18, 1964) is an American businessman and politician serving as the U.S. representative for Kentucky's 2nd congressional district since 2009. The district is in central Kentucky and includes Fort Knox, Owensboro, Bowling Green, and a portion of eastern Louisville. Guthrie previously served as a Republican member of the Kentucky Senate.

== Early life, education, and career ==
Guthrie was born in Florence, Alabama, the son of Carolyn P. (née Holt) and Lowell M. Guthrie. He earned his Bachelor of Science in mathematical economics at the U.S. Military Academy at West Point in 1987 and his Master's of Public and Private Management at the Yale School of Management in 1997.

Guthrie is a former vice president of Trace Die Cast, Inc., an automotive parts supplier based in Bowling Green. He previously served as a field artillery officer in the 101st Airborne Division at Fort Campbell, Kentucky.

== Kentucky Senate ==
Guthrie represented the 32nd district in the Kentucky Senate from 1999 to 2008, serving as vice chair of the Economic Development, Tourism and Labor Committee and chairing the Transportation Committee.

== U.S. House of Representatives ==
=== Elections ===
2008

In the 2008 congressional general election, Guthrie defeated Democratic nominee State Senator David Boswell for the right to succeed the retiring U.S. Representative Ron Lewis. Lewis announced his retirement on the last day for candidates to file for the seat in 2008, in hopes of steering the Republican nomination to his chief of staff, Daniel London. Guthrie defeated London for the nomination.

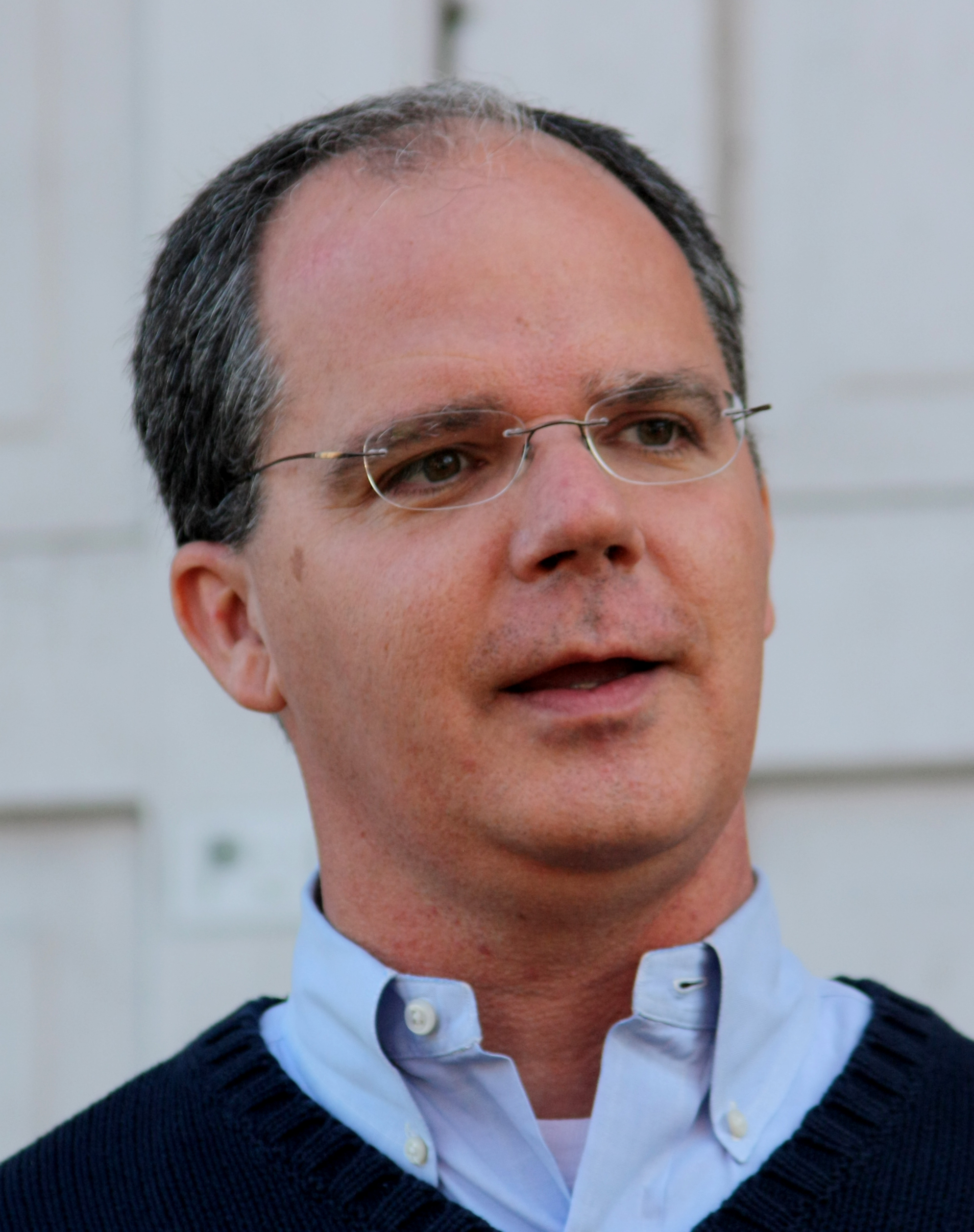
Guthrie in Hawesville, Kentucky.

This set up the closest race in the 2nd in 14 years. Democrats had a large advantage in registration, but voters had been very conservative on social issues. This was a major reason Lewis had been able to hold the district with little trouble since winning it in a 1994 special election. Guthrie prevailed by 15,500 votes, mostly on the strength of rural voters. He may have been boosted by voters being more motivated to come to the polls due to the presidential and Senate election held at the same time. Republican presidential nominee John McCain carried the district with 60% of the vote and won all but one county entirely within the district. Incumbent Republican Senator Mitch McConnell also carried the 2nd district easily.

2010

The 2nd reverted to form in 2010, and Guthrie defeated Democratic nominee Ed Marksberry by a large margin.

2012

Guthrie won reelection in 2012 with over 64% of the vote.

2018

Guthrie filed for reelection on November 27, 2017. Two Democratic challengers filed against Guthrie: Grant Short and Brian Pedigo, both of whom ultimately lost to Democratic candidate Hank Linderman in the primary.

=== Tenure ===
2011

In 2011, Guthrie voted for the National Defense Authorization Act for Fiscal Year 2012 as part of a controversial provision that allows the government and the military to indefinitely detain American citizens and others without trial. In July 2013, he voted against defunding the National Security Agency due to the alleged privacy violations reported by whistleblower Edward Snowden.

2013

Guthrie voted in favor of ending the 2013 United States federal government shutdown.

In September, Guthrie introduced the Missing Children's Assistance Reauthorization Act of 2013, authorizing the continued funding of the National Center for Missing and Exploited Children through fiscal year 2018 and to strengthen additional programs that prevent the abduction and sexual exploitation of children.

2017

Guthrie and Virginia Foxx introduced the Promoting Real Opportunity, Success and Prosperity through Education Reform (PROSPER) Act, an act that would eliminate Public Service Loan Forgiveness and reduce federal funding made available to for-profit colleges.

On December 19, Guthrie voted for the Tax Cuts and Jobs Act. Before his vote, he said he was "willing to accept" criticism about the bill making American businesses more competitive on a global scale.

2022

In August 2022, Guthrie criticized President Joe Biden for forgiving up to $10,000 of student loan debt for eligible borrowers. Guthrie was criticized for hypocrisy because he had $4.3 million of debt from his PPP loan forgiven.

=== Committee assignments ===
For the 119th Congress:

- Committee on Energy and Commerce (Chair)

=== Caucus memberships ===
- Congressional Arts Caucus
- Republican Study Committee
- Climate Solutions Caucus
- U.S.–Japan Caucus
- Rare Disease Caucus
- Congressional Caucus on Turkey and Turkish Americans

== Political positions ==
Guthrie supports the repeal and replacement of the Affordable Care Act ("Obamacare"). He also co-sponsored, along with Representatives Greg Murphy and Don Davis, a bill to reduce the power of Medicare to negotiate drug prices.

== Personal life ==
He married Beth Clemmons and has three children and three grandchildren.

== Electoral history ==
Kentucky 32nd State Senate District General Election, 1998
Party	Candidate	Votes	%
Republican	Brett Guthrie	13,493	50.24
Democratic	Ron Murphy	13,363	49.76
Total votes		26,856	100.0

Kentucky 32nd State Senate District General Election, 2002
Party	Candidate	Votes	%
Republican	Brett Guthrie (incumbent)	19,498	100.0
Total votes		19,498	100.0

Kentucky 32nd State Senate District General Election, 2006
Party	Candidate	Votes	%
Republican	Brett Guthrie (incumbent)	21,695	100.0
Total votes		21,695	100.0

Kentucky 2nd Congressional District General Election, 2008
Party	Candidate	Votes	%
Republican	S. Brett Guthrie	158,936	52.57
Democratic	David E. Boswell	143,379	47.43
Total votes		302,315	100.0

Kentucky 2nd Congressional District General Election, 2010
Party	Candidate	Votes	%
Republican	S. Brett Guthrie (incumbent)	155,906	67.89
Democratic	Ed Marksberry	73,749	32.11
Total votes		229,655	100.0

Kentucky 2nd Congressional District General Election, 2012
Party	Candidate	Votes	%
Republican	S. Brett Guthrie (incumbent)	181,508	64.30
Democratic	David Lynn Williams	89,541	31.72
Independent	Andrew R. Beacham	6,304	2.23
Libertarian	Craig R. Astor	4,914	1.74
Total votes		282,267	100.0

Kentucky 2nd Congressional District General Election, 2014
Party	Candidate	Votes	%
Republican	S. Brett Guthrie (incumbent)	156,936	69.19
Democratic	Ron Leach	69,898	30.81
Total votes		226,834	100.0

Kentucky 2nd Congressional District General Election, 2016
Party	Candidate	Votes	%
Republican	S. Brett Guthrie (incumbent)	251,825	100.0
Total votes		251,825	100.0

Kentucky 2nd Congressional District General Election, 2018
Party	Candidate	Votes	%
Republican	S. Brett Guthrie (incumbent)	171,700	66.72
Democratic	Hank Linderman	79,964	31.07
Independent	Thomas E. Loecken	5,681	2.21
Total votes		257,345	100.0

Kentucky 2nd Congressional District General Election, 2020
Party	Candidate	Votes	%
Republican	Brett Guthrie (incumbent)	255,735	70.9
Democratic	Hank Linderman	94,643	26.3
Libertarian	Robert Lee Perry	7,588	2.1
Populist	Lewis Carter	2,431	0.7
Write-in		2	0.0
Total votes		360,399	100.0

Kentucky 2nd Congressional District General Election, 2022
Party	Candidate	Votes	%
Republican	Brett Guthrie (incumbent)	170,487	71.9
Democratic	Hank Linderman	66,769	28.1
Total votes		237,256	100.0

Kentucky 2nd Congressional District General Election, 2024
Party	Candidate	Votes	%
Republican	Brett Guthrie (incumbent)	252,826	73.1
Democratic	Hank Linderman	93,029	26.9
Total votes		345,855	100.0

U.S. House of Representatives
Preceded by Ron Lewis	Member of the U.S. House of Representatives from Kentucky's 2nd congressional district 2009–present	Incumbent
Preceded by Cathy McMorris Rodgers	Chair of the House Energy Committee; 2025–present	Incumbent
U.S. order of precedence (ceremonial)
Preceded by Steve Scalise	United States representatives by seniority 66th	Succeeded by Jim Himes
