= Mike Wilson (Kentucky politician) =

American politician

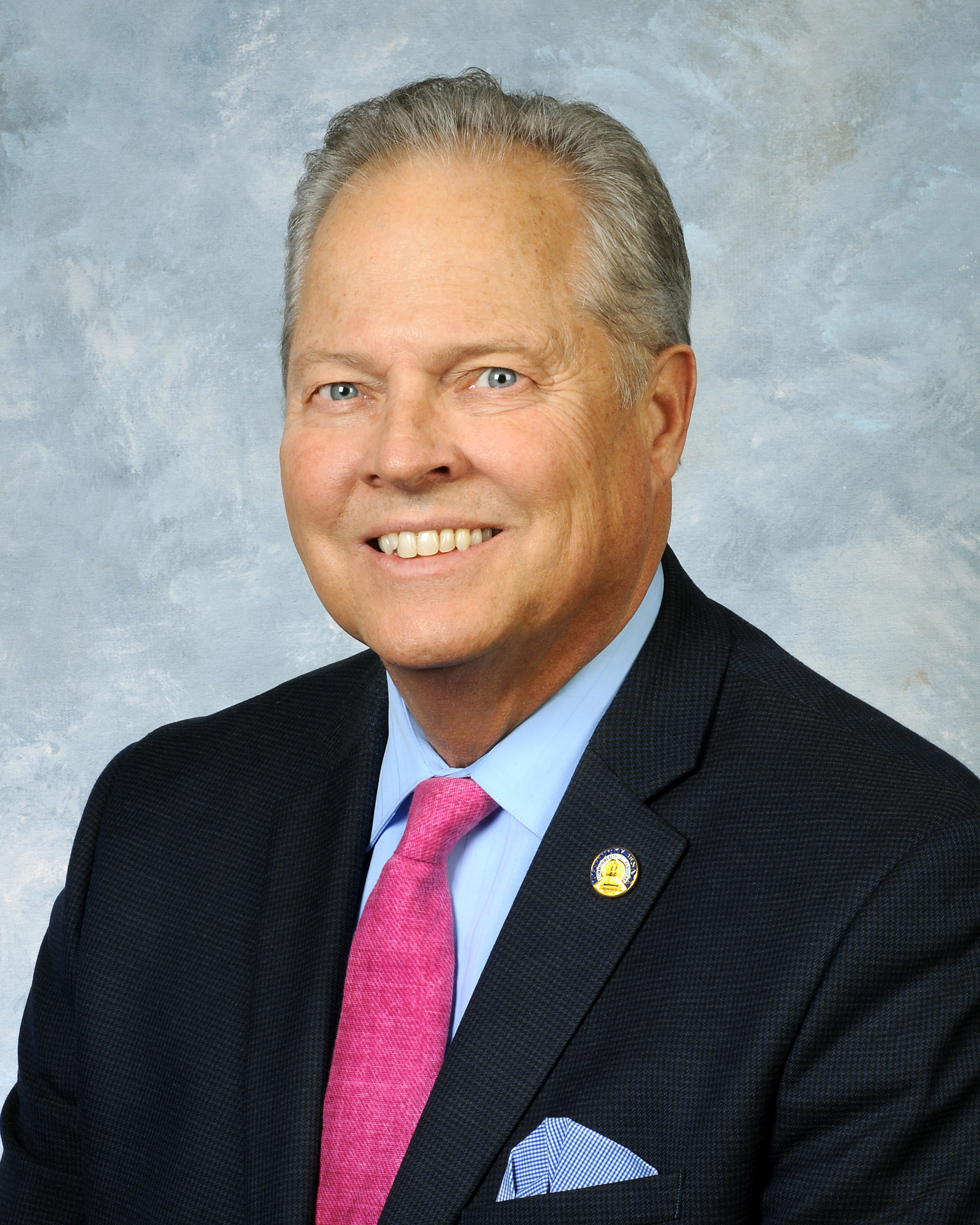
- Official portrait, 2019

Majority Whip of the Kentucky Senate
- Incumbent
- Assumed office January 2, 2018
- Preceded by: Jimmy Higdon

Member of the Kentucky Senate from the 32nd district
- Incumbent
- Assumed office January 1, 2011
- Preceded by: Mike Reynolds

Personal details
- Born: December 4, 1951 (age 74) New Albany, Mississippi, U.S.
- Party: Republican
- Education: Fullerton College; California State University, Fullerton

Military service
- Branch/service: United States Marine Corps
- Years of service: 1972–1981

Mike Wilson (born December 4, 1951) is an American politician and a Republican member of the Kentucky Senate representing District 32 since January 2011. He has served as the Senate Majority Whip since 2018. He is also a veteran of the US Marine Corps.

== Education ==
Wilson earned his AA from Fullerton College and his BA in business administration from California State University, Fullerton.

== Political career ==
In 2010, to challenge District 32 appointed Democratic Senator Mike Reynolds, Wilson won the three-way May 18, 2010 Republican Primary with 5,025 votes (51.5%) and won the November 2, 2010 General election with 18,935 votes (55.0%) against Senator Reynolds. From November, 2016 to November, 2017, Wilson was one of the most frequent travellers among state legislators.
