= Bob Leeper =

American politician (born 1958)

Judge/Executive of McCracken County
- In office January 5, 2015 – January 7, 2019
- Preceded by: Van Newberry
- Succeeded by: Craig Clymer

Member of the Kentucky Senate from the 2nd district
- In office January 1, 1991 – January 1, 2015
- Preceded by: Helen Garrett
- Succeeded by: Danny Carroll

Personal details
- Born: Robert J. Leeper; December 8, 1958 (age 67)
- Party: Independent (2005–present)
- Other political affiliations: Republican (1999–2005); Democratic (before 1999)
- Education: Paducah Community College; Sherman College of Chiropractic
- Profession: Chiropractor
- Website: www.lrc.ky.gov/...

Robert Joseph Leeper (born December 8, 1958) is an American independent politician and chiropractor. He was a member of the Kentucky Senate from 1991 to 2015 retiring to run for McCracken County Judge-Executive. In 2014, he was elected Judge-Executive of McCracken County, but chose not to seek reelection in 2018.

== Education ==
Leeper attended Paducah Community College and Sherman College of Chiropractic.

== Political career ==
Prior to serving in the Kentucky Senate, Leeper was a city commissioner in Paducah.

=== Kentucky Senate ===
Originally a Democrat, Leeper joined the Republican Party in 1999, and became a political independent later in 2005. Leeper has been described as an "ultra-conservative independent", and was known in the legislature for his opposition to expanded gambling. In 2012, he mounted an unsuccessful candidacy to serve as president of the Kentucky Senate. He decided against re-election in 2014 and ran for McCracken County Judge-Executive.

=== Judge-Executive of McCracken County ===
In 2014, Leeper was elected Judge-Executive of McCracken County. In 2018, he faced criticism over the termination of Paducah Economic Development president and CEO Scott Darnell, and issued a statement saying he would not answer questions about the matter. He did not seek reelection in 2018.

== Honors ==
In 2020, he was honored with the opening of the Bob Leeper Bridge, a 110-foot pedestrian bridge in McCracken County.
