= R. J. Palmer =

American politician

Judge/Executive of Clark County
- Incumbent
- Assumed office March 26, 2026
- Preceded by: Steve Craycraft (interim)

Minority Leader of the Kentucky Senate
- In office January 4, 2011 – January 1, 2015
- Preceded by: Ed Worley
- Succeeded by: Ray Jones II

Member of the Kentucky Senate from the 28th district
- In office September 19, 2001 – January 1, 2015
- Preceded by: Dale Shrout
- Succeeded by: Ralph Alvarado

Member of the Kentucky House of Representatives from the 73rd district
- In office January 1, 1999 – September 19, 2001
- Preceded by: Drew Graham
- Succeeded by: Don Pasley

Personal details
- Born: December 25, 1970 (age 55)
- Party: Democratic
- Education: Transylvania University (BA); Eastern Kentucky University (MBA)

Ralph Joe Palmer II (born December 25, 1970) is an American politician who has served as judge/executive of Clark County, Kentucky, since March 2026. A member of the Democratic Party, he previously served as a member of the Kentucky Senate from 2001 to 2015 and the Kentucky House from 1999 to 2001.

During his tenure, Palmer served as minority leader of the Kentucky Senate from 2011 to 2015.

== Biography ==
Palmer is from Winchester, Kentucky. He graduated with a Bachelor of Arts degree from Transylvania University and a Master of Business Administration degree from Eastern Kentucky University.

He was first elected to the house in 1998 when incumbent representative Drew Graham retired to run for judge/executive of Clark County. He served in the Kentucky House of Representatives from January 1, 1999, through September 19, 2001, and served in the Kentucky Senate from 2001 until he was defeated by challenger Ralph Alvarado and replaced in 2015. His senate district included Bath, Bourbon, Clark, Harrison, Montgomery, Nicholas counties.

On March 26, 2026, Palmer was appointed judge/executive of Clark County by governor Andy Beshear following the resignation of incumbent Les Yates.
