= Jared Carpenter =

American politician (born 1977)

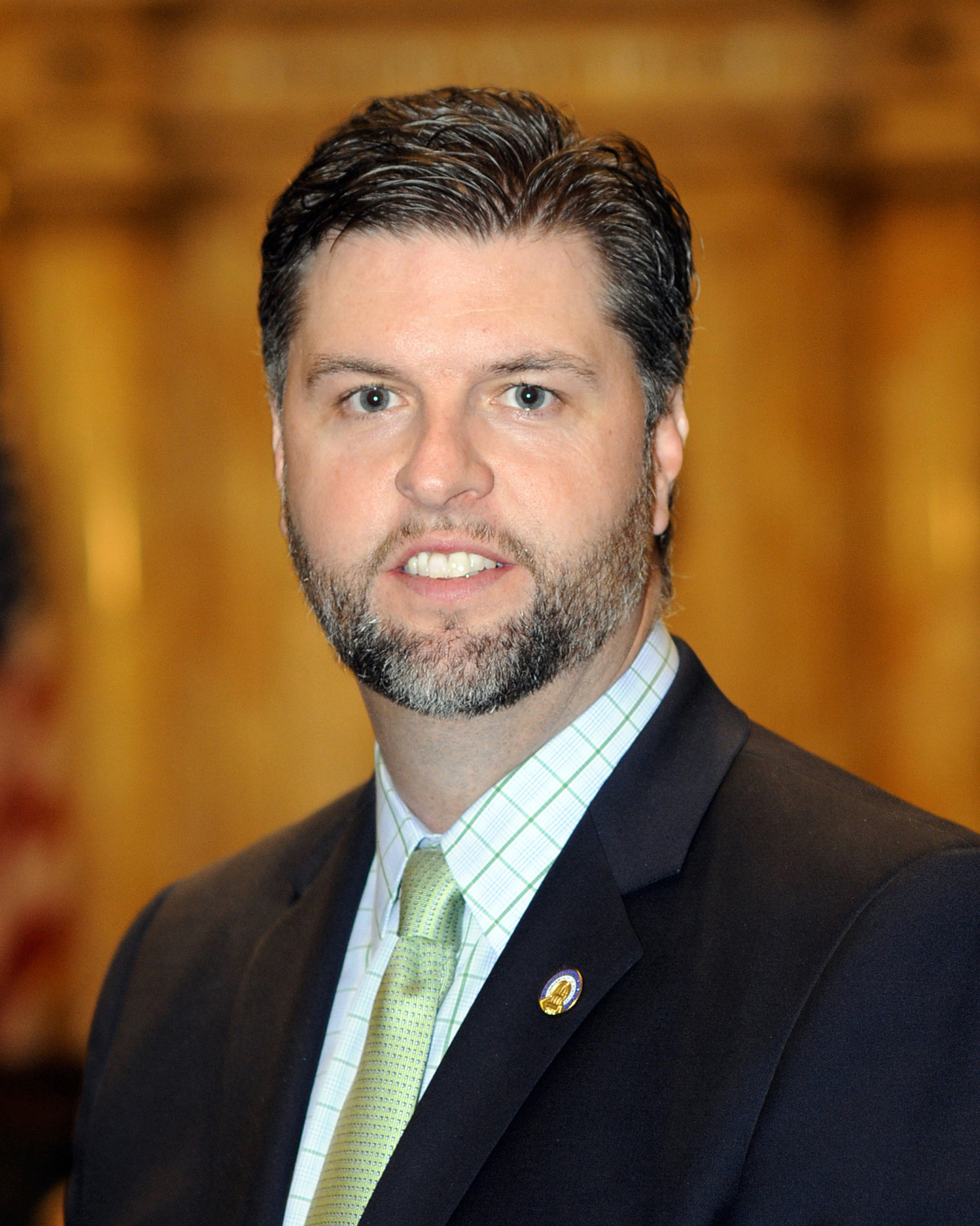
- Official portrait, 2016

Member of the Kentucky Senate from the 34th district
- Incumbent
- Assumed office January 1, 2011
- Preceded by: Ed Worley

Personal details
- Born: April 26, 1977 (age 49) Berea, Kentucky, U.S.
- Party: Republican
- Education: Eastern Kentucky University (BA)

Jared Keith Carpenter (born in Richmond, Kentucky, April 26, 1977) is a Republican member of the Kentucky Senate representing District 34 since January 2011. He is the Chairman of the Senate Banking & Insurance Committee. He also serves on the Agriculture, Transportation, and Natural Resources & Energy Committees. Away from Frankfort he is a businessman and farmer residing in Berea with his family.

== Education ==
Carpenter earned his BA from Eastern Kentucky University where he was a member of the basketball team.

== Elections ==
- In 2022 he defeated Rhonda Goode in the Republican Primary with 6,086 votes (75.6%). He defeated his Democratic challenger, Susan Cintra with 24,140 votes (59.7%).
- In 2018 he ran unopposed in the Republican Primary. He defeated his Democratic challenger, Susan Byrne Haddix with 28,145 votes (61.8%).
- In 2014 he ran unopposed in the Republican Primary. He defeated his Democratic challenger, Michael Cope, in the general election with 22,932 votes (64.6%).
- 2010 When District 34 Senator Ed Worley retired and left the seat open, Carpenter won the three-way May 18, 2010, Republican Primary with 4,405 votes (37.9%) and won the three-way November 2, 2010, general election with 23,553 votes (64.9%) against Democratic nominee Lee Murphy and Evangelical Christian Party candidate Donald VanWinkle.
