= Alice Forgy Kerr =

American politician

Member of the Kentucky Senate from the 12th district
- In office January 1, 1999 – January 1, 2023
- Preceded by: Timothy N. Philpot
- Succeeded by: Amanda Mays Bledsoe

Personal details
- Born: August 30, 1954 (age 72)
- Party: Republican
- Relatives: Larry Forgy (brother); Thomas Kerr (brother-in-law)

Alice Forgy Kerr (born August 30, 1954) is an American politician who served in the Kentucky Senate from the 12th district from 1999 to 2023.

In 2004, she was the Republican nominee in a special election in Kentucky's 6th congressional district, which she lost to Democratic nominee Ben Chandler.

In July 2021, Kerr announced that she would not run for reelection in 2022.
