= Ernie Harris (politician) =

American politician

Member of the Kentucky Senate from the 26th district
- In office January 1, 1995 – April 15, 2020
- Preceded by: Rick Rand
- Succeeded by: Karen Berg

Personal details
- Born: December 23, 1947 (age 78) Louisville, Kentucky, U.S.
- Party: Republican

Ernest Leo Harris Jr. (born December 23, 1947) is an American politician. He was a member of the Kentucky Senate from the 26th District from 1995 to 2020. He is a member of the Republican Party. He announced in April 2020 that he would resign from the senate.
