= Tom Buford =

American politician (1949–2021)

Member of the Kentucky Senate from the 22nd district
- In office January 1, 1991 – July 6, 2021
- Preceded by: Bill Clouse
- Succeeded by: Donald Douglas

Personal details
- Born: May 23, 1949 Lexington, Kentucky, U.S.
- Died: July 6, 2021 (aged 72) Pensacola, Florida, U.S.
- Party: Republican

Tom Buford (May 23, 1949 – July 6, 2021) was an American politician who served in the Kentucky Senate from the 22nd district from 1991 until his death in 2021.

In 2004, Buford was the Republican nominee for Kentucky's 6th congressional district, losing to incumbent Democratic representative Ben Chandler.

He died of cancer on July 6, 2021, in Pensacola, Florida at age 72.
