= Dorsey Ridley =

American politician

Member of the Kentucky Senate from the 4th district
- In office July 2004 – January 1, 2019
- Preceded by: Paul Herron
- Succeeded by: Robby Mills

Member of the Kentucky House of Representatives from the 12th district
- In office January 1, 1987 – January 1, 1995
- Preceded by: Roy Joe Head
- Succeeded by: Jim Gooch Jr.

Personal details
- Born: November 26, 1953 (age 72)
- Party: Democratic

James Dorsey Ridley (born November 26, 1953) is an American politician. He was a member of the Kentucky Senate from the 4th District, serving from 2004 to 2019. He is a member of the Democratic Party. First elected in a July 2004 special election following the death of senator Paul Herron, he was defeated for reelection in 2018 by Republican Robby Mills.

Ridley served in the Kentucky House of Representatives from 1987 to 1995. He was first elected in 1986, defeating incumbent Roy Joe Head in the Democratic primary election. He did not seek reelection in 1994.

In 2022 Ridley ran for County Judge/Executive of Henderson County but lost to incumbent Republican Brad Schneider.
