= Dan Seum =

American politician from Kentucky

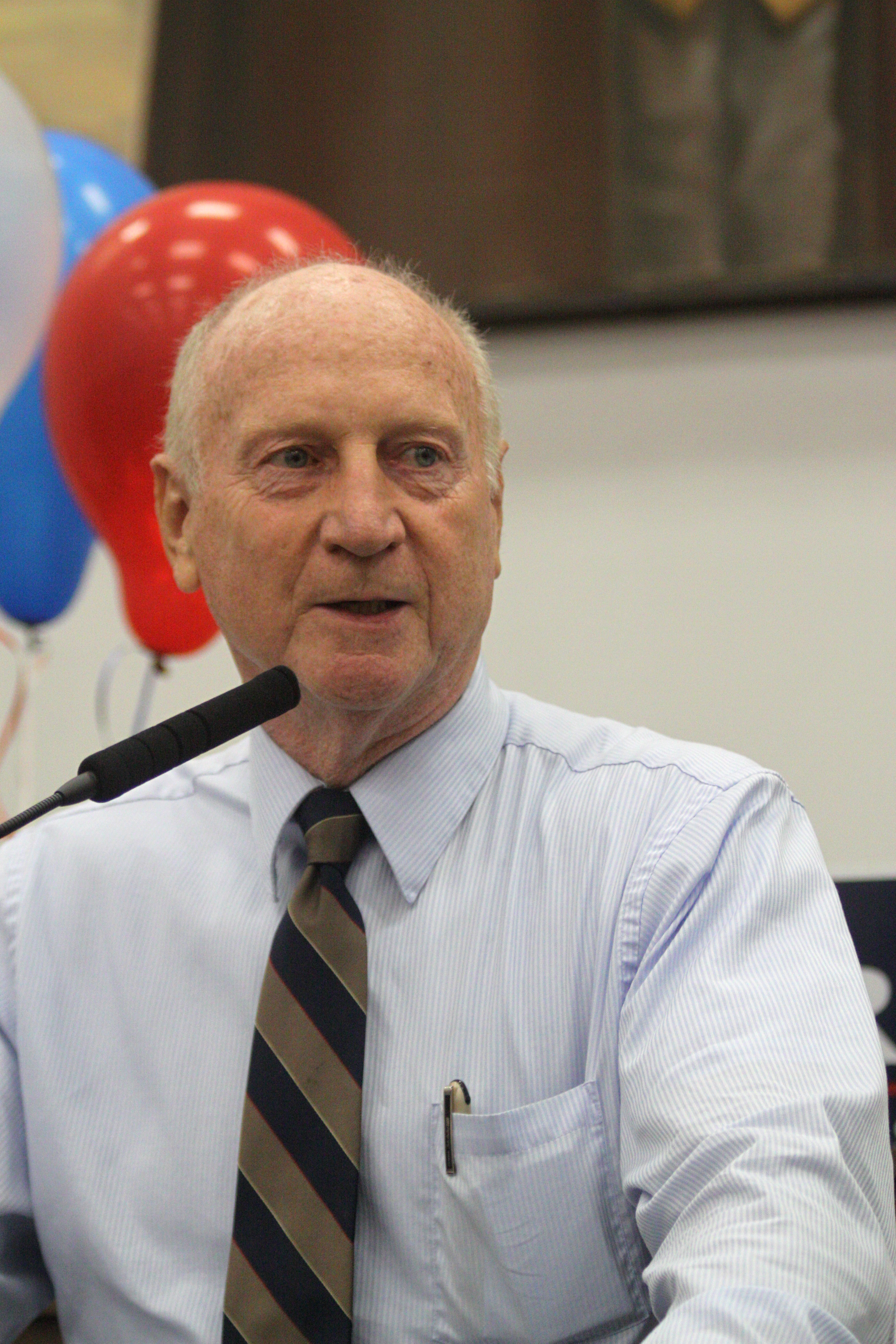

Majority Whip of the Kentucky Senate
- In office January 4, 2005 – January 8, 2008
- Preceded by: Elizabeth Tori
- Succeeded by: Carroll Gibson

Member of the Kentucky Senate
- In office January 1, 1995 – November 16, 2019
- Preceded by: Danny Meyer
- Succeeded by: Michael J. Nemes
- Constituency: 38th district
- In office January 1, 1989 – January 1, 1993
- Preceded by: Larry Saunders
- Succeeded by: Larry Saunders
- Constituency: 37th district

Member of the Kentucky House of Representatives from the 38th district
- In office January 1, 1982 – January 1, 1989
- Preceded by: Dexter Wright
- Succeeded by: Denver Butler Sr.

Personal details
- Born: January 28, 1940 (age 86)
- Party: Republican (since 1999); Democratic (until 1999)

Daniel DeVerl "Malano" Seum (/ˈsaɪm/ SYME; born January 28, 1940) is an American politician. He was a member of the Kentucky Senate, representing the 38th district from 1995 to 2019.

Seum began his career as a member of the Democratic party. He was first elected to the state house in 1981, defeating incumbent Republican Dexter Wright. Seum continued in the house until he was elected to the senate in 1988, defeating incumbent Democratic senator Larry Saunders for renomination. Saunders challenged Seum again in 1992, defeating him. Seum was elected to the senate again in 1994 following the retirement of senator Danny Meyer. In July 1999 he changed party affiliation, joining the Republican party.

He resigned from the senate in November 2019.
