= Kentucky General Assembly =

Legislative branch of the state government of Kentucky

- 2026 session (adjourned)

Type
- Type: Bicameral
- Houses: Senate; House of Representatives
- Term limits: None

History
- Founded: May 26, 1845

Leadership
- Senate President: Robert Stivers (R) since January 8, 2013
- House Speaker: David Osborne (R) since January 8, 2019

Structure
- Seats: 138 voting members: 38 senators; 100 representatives
- Senate political groups: Republican (32); Democratic (6)
- House political groups: Republican (80); Democratic (20)
- Length of term: Senate 4 years House of Representatives 2 years
- Salary: $188.22/day + per diem (elected before January 1, 2023) $203.28/day + per diem (elected after January 1, 2023)

Elections
- Last Senate election: November 3, 2026 (19 seats)
- Last House election: November 3, 2026
- Next Senate election: November 7, 2028 (19 seats)
- Next House election: November 7, 2028
- Redistricting: Legislative control

Motto
- United we stand, divided we fall

Meeting place
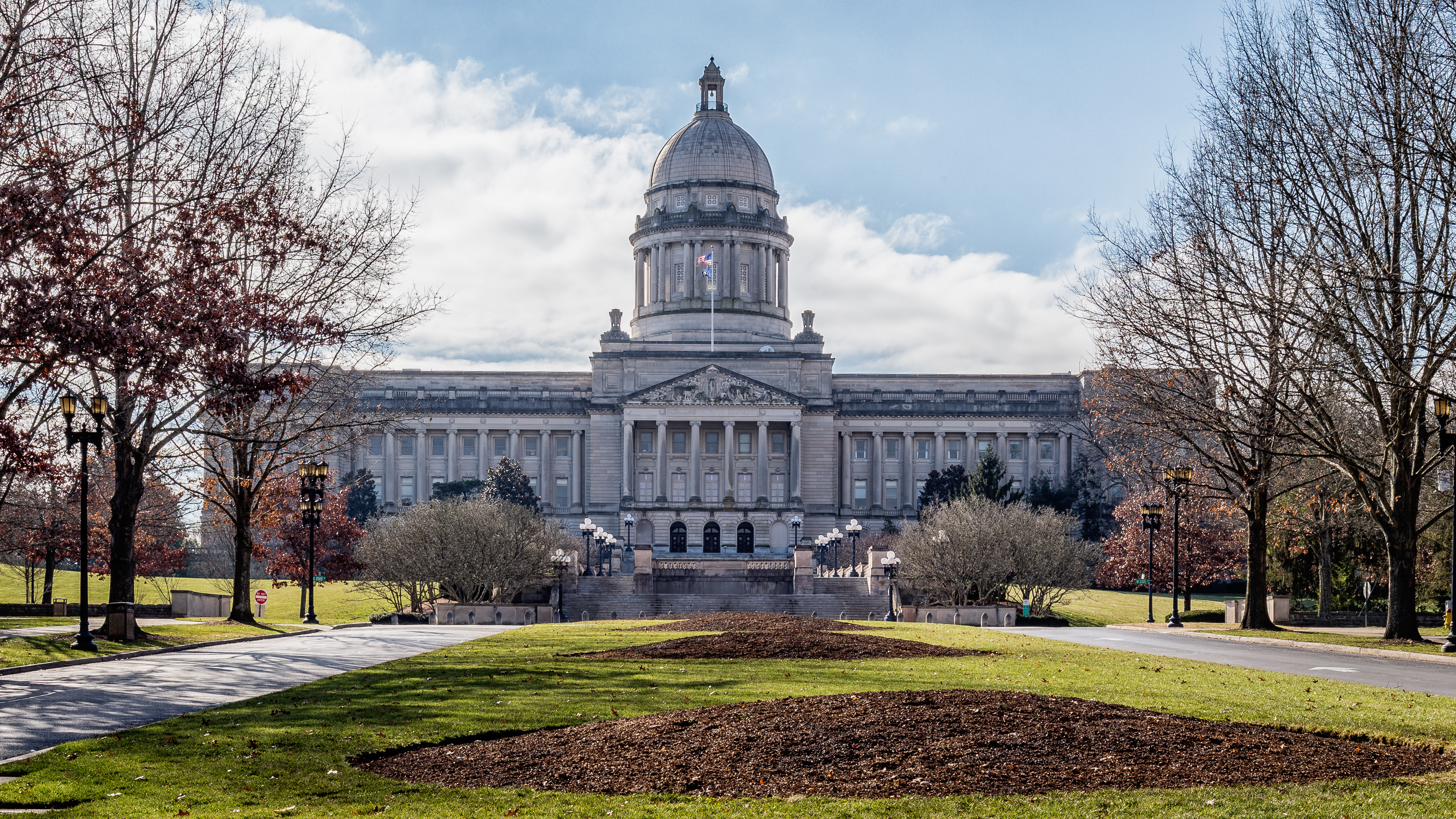
- Kentucky State Capitol; Frankfort

Website
- legislature.ky.gov/Pages/index.aspx

The Kentucky General Assembly, also called the Kentucky Legislature, is the state legislature of the U.S. state of Kentucky. It comprises the Kentucky Senate and the Kentucky House of Representatives.

The General Assembly meets annually in the state capitol building in Frankfort, convening on the first Tuesday after the first Monday in January. In even-numbered years, sessions may not last more than 60 legislative days, and cannot extend beyond April 15. In odd-numbered years, sessions may not last more than 30 legislative days, and cannot extend beyond March 30. Special sessions may be called by the Governor of Kentucky at any time and for any duration.

== History ==
The first meeting of the General Assembly occurred in 1792, shortly after Kentucky was granted statehood. Legislators convened in Lexington, the state's temporary capital. Among the first orders of business was choosing a permanent state capital. In the end, the small town of Frankfort, with their offer to provide a temporary structure to house the legislature and a cache of materials for constructing a permanent edifice, was chosen, and the state's capital has remained there ever since.

After women gained suffrage in Kentucky, Mary Elliott Flanery was elected to the Kentucky House of Representatives from the 89th District, representing Boyd County, Kentucky. When Flanery took her seat in January 1922, she was the first female state legislator elected in Kentucky and the first female legislator elected south of the Mason–Dixon line.

Operation Boptrot led to the conviction of more than a dozen legislators between 1992 and 1995. The investigation also led to reform legislation being passed in 1993.

=== The Civil War ===
Due to the strong Southern Unionist sympathies of a large portion of the Commonwealth's citizens and elected officials, Kentucky remained officially neutral during the Civil War. Even so, a group of Confederate sympathizers met in Russellville representing 68 Kentucky counties in the western and central parts of the state in November 1861, to establish a Confederate government for the state. The group established a Confederate state capital in Bowling Green controlling half the state early in the war, but never successfully displaced the elected General Assembly in Frankfort.

=== Assassination of Governor Goebel ===
The General Assembly played a decisive role in the disputed gubernatorial election of 1899. Initial vote tallies had Republican William S. Taylor leading Democrat William Goebel by a scant 2,383 votes. The General Assembly, however, wielded the final authority in election disputes. With a majority in both houses, the Democrats attempted to invalidate enough votes to give the election to Goebel. During the contentious days that followed, an unidentified assassin shot Goebel as he approached the state capitol.

As Goebel hovered on the brink of death, chaos ensued in Frankfort, and further violence threatened. Taylor, serving as governor pending a final decision on the election, called out the militia and ordered the General Assembly into a special session, not in Frankfort, but in London, Kentucky, a Republican area of the state. The Republican minority naturally heeded the call and headed to London. Democrats predictably resisted the call, many retiring to Louisville instead. Both factions claimed authority, but the Republicans were too few in number to muster a quorum.

Goebel died four days after receiving the fatal shot, and the election was eventually contested to the U.S. Supreme Court, who ruled the General Assembly's actions legal and made Goebel's lieutenant governor, J. C. W. Beckham, governor of the state.

== Houses ==
The General Assembly is bicameral, consisting of a Senate and a House of Representatives. The House and Senate chambers are on opposite ends of the third floor of the capitol building, and legislators have offices in the nearby Capitol Annex building.

Section 33 of the Kentucky Constitution requires that the General Assembly divide the state into 38 Senate and 100 House districts. Districts are required to be as nearly equal in population as possible. Districts can be formed by joining more than one county, but the counties forming a district must be contiguous. Districts must be reviewed every 10 years and be re-divided if necessary.

Under the state constitution, only three counties may be divided to form a Senate district—Jefferson (Louisville), Fayette (Lexington) and Kenton (Covington).

=== Senate ===
The Senate is the upper house of the General Assembly.

==== Terms and qualifications ====
According to Section 32 of the Kentucky Constitution, a senator must:

- be at least 30 years old;
- be a citizen of Kentucky;
- have resided in the state at least 6 years and the district at least 1 year prior to election.

Under section 30 of the Kentucky Constitution, senators are elected to four year staggered terms, with half the Senate elected every two years.

==== Leadership ====
Prior to a 1992 constitutional amendment, the Lieutenant Governor of Kentucky presided over the Senate; the 1992 amendment created a new office of President of the Senate to be held by one of the 38 senators.

- President (elected by full body): Robert Stivers (R-25)
- President Pro-Tempore (elected by full body): David P. Givens (R-9)

Additionally, each party elects a floor leader, whip, and caucus chair.

Current party leadership of the Kentucky Senate
	Republican Party	Democratic Party
Floor Leader	Max Wise (R-16)	Gerald Neal (D-33)
Whip	Mike Wilson (R-32)	Cassie Chambers Armstrong (D-19)
Caucus chair	Robby Mills (R-4)	Reginald L. Thomas (D-13)

=== House of Representatives ===
The House of Representatives is the lower house of the General Assembly. Section 47 of the Kentucky Constitution stipulates that all bills for raising revenue must originate in the House of Representatives.

==== Terms and qualifications ====
According to Section 32 of the Kentucky Constitution, a representative must:

- be at least 24 years old;
- be a citizen of Kentucky
- have resided in the state at least 2 years and the district at least 1 year prior to election.

Per section 30 of the Kentucky Constitution, representatives are elected every two years in the November following a regular session of the General Assembly.

==== Leadership ====
- Speaker (elected by full body): David Osborne (R-59)
- Speaker Pro Tempore (elected by full body): David Meade (R-80)

Additionally, each party elects a floor leader, whip, and caucus chair.

Current party leadership of the Kentucky House of Representatives
	Republican Party	Democratic Party
Leader	Steven Rudy (R-1)	Pamela Stevenson (D-43)
Whip	Jason Nemes (R-33)	Joshua Watkins (D-42)
Caucus chair	Suzanne Miles (R-7)	Lindsey Burke (D-75)

== Committees ==
=== Senate committees ===
Committee	Chair	Vice Chair
Agriculture	Jason Howell	Gary Boswell
Appropriations and Revenue	Christian McDaniel	Amanda Mays Bledsoe
Banking and Insurance	Jared Carpenter	Rick Girdler
Committee on Committees	Robert Stivers	none
Economic Development, Tourism, and Labor	Phillip Wheeler	Shelley Funke Frommeyer
Education	Stephen West	Lindsey Tichenor
Enrollment	Matt Nunn	none
Families and Children	Danny Carroll	Amanda Mays Bledsoe
Health and Services	Stephen Meredith	Craig Richardson
Judiciary	Brandon J. Storm	Phillip Wheeler
Licensing and Occupations	Julie Raque Adams	Jason Howell
Natural Resources and Energy	Brandon Smith	Gex Williams
Rules	Robert Stivers	none
State and Local Government	Michael J. Nemes	Greg Elkins
Transportation	Jimmy Higdon	Donald Douglas
Veterans, Military Affairs, and Public Protection	Matthew Deneen	Aaron Reed

=== House of Representatives committees ===
Committee	Chair	Vice Chair(s)
Agriculture	Myron Dossett	Daniel Fister
Appropriations and Revenue	Jason Petrie	Adam Bowling and Josh Bray
Banking and Insurance	Michael Meredith	Matt Lockett and Michael Pollock
Committee on Committees	David W. Osborne	David Meade
Economic Development and Workforce Investment	Josh Branscum	Thomas Huff
Elections, Const. Amendments, and Intergovernmental Affairs	DJ Johnson	John Hodgson
Enrollment	Thomas Huff	none
Families and Children	Samara Heavrin	Nick Wilson
Health Services	Kimberly Poore Moser	Robert Duvall
Judiciary	Daniel Elliott	Jennifer Decker
Licensing, Occupations, and Administrative Regulations	Matthew Koch	Tom Smith
Local Government	Patrick Flannery	Amy Neighbors
Natural Resources and Energy	Jim Gooch Jr.	Jared Bauman and Richard White
Postsecondary Education	James Tipton	Shane Baker
Primary and Secondary Education	Scott Lewis	Mike Clines
Rules	David W. Osborne	David Meade
Small Business and Information Technology	Deanna Frazier Gordon	William Lawrence
State Government	David Hale	Rebecca Raymer
Tourism and Outdoor Recreation	Kim King	Susan Witten
Transportation	John Blanton	Mary Beth Imes
Veterans, Military Affairs, and Public Protection	Bobby McCool	Bill Wesley

== Legislative Research Commission ==
The Kentucky General Assembly is served by a 16-member nonpartisan agency called the Legislative Research Commission (LRC). Created in 1948, the LRC provides the General Assembly with staff and research support including committee staffing, bill drafting, oversight of the state budget and educational reform, production of educational materials, maintenance of a reference library and Internet site, and the preparation and printing of research reports, informational bulletins and a legislative newspaper. It is led by the elected leadership of the Democratic and Republican parties in both the Kentucky House of Representatives and the Kentucky Senate, while the agency is run on a day-to-day basis by a Director.

== See also ==
- Kentucky Senate
- Kentucky House of Representatives
- List of Kentucky General Assemblies
- Government of Kentucky
