= 2026 Kentucky Senate election =

- November 3, 2026

19 out of 38 seats in the Kentucky Senate 20 seats needed for a majority
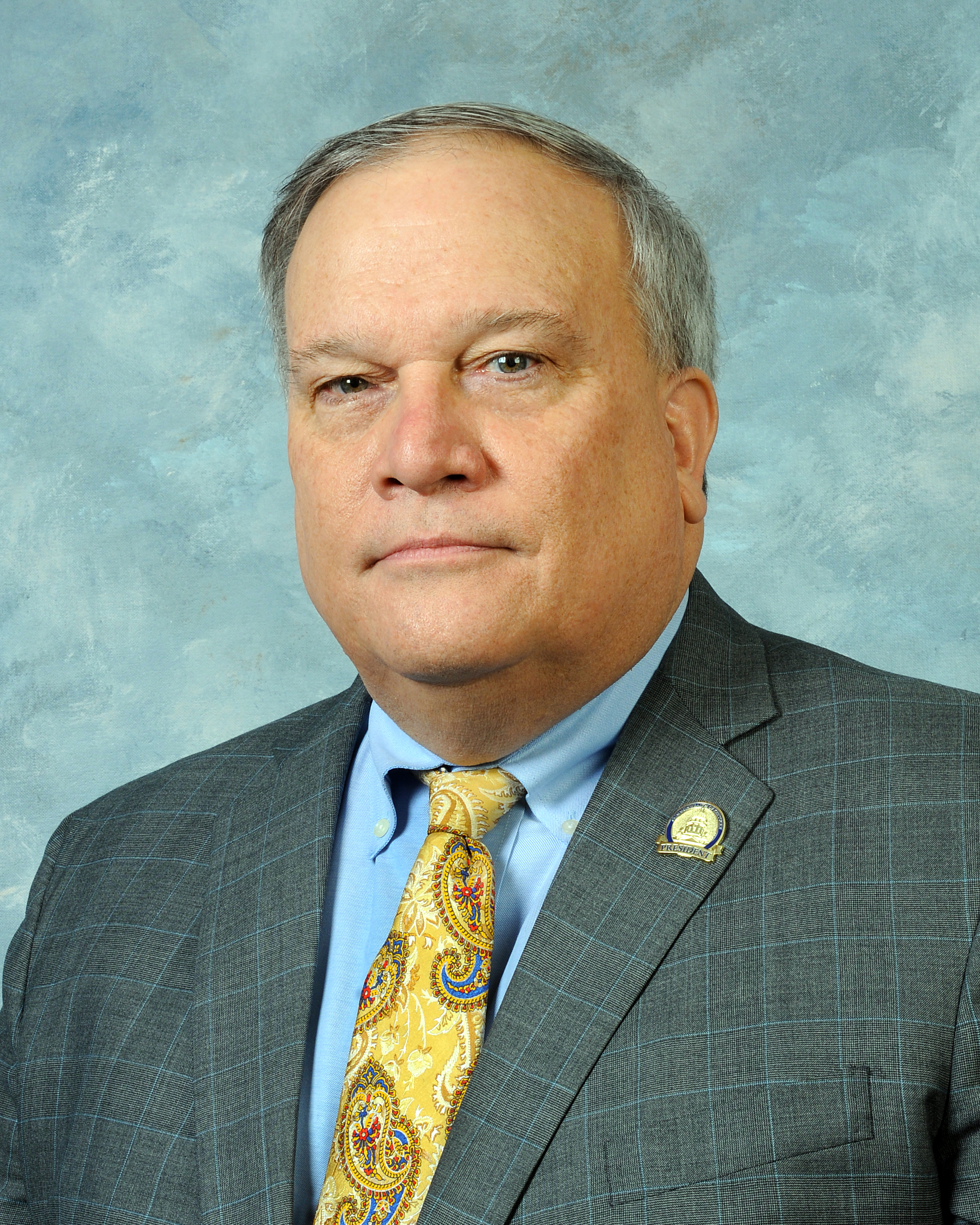

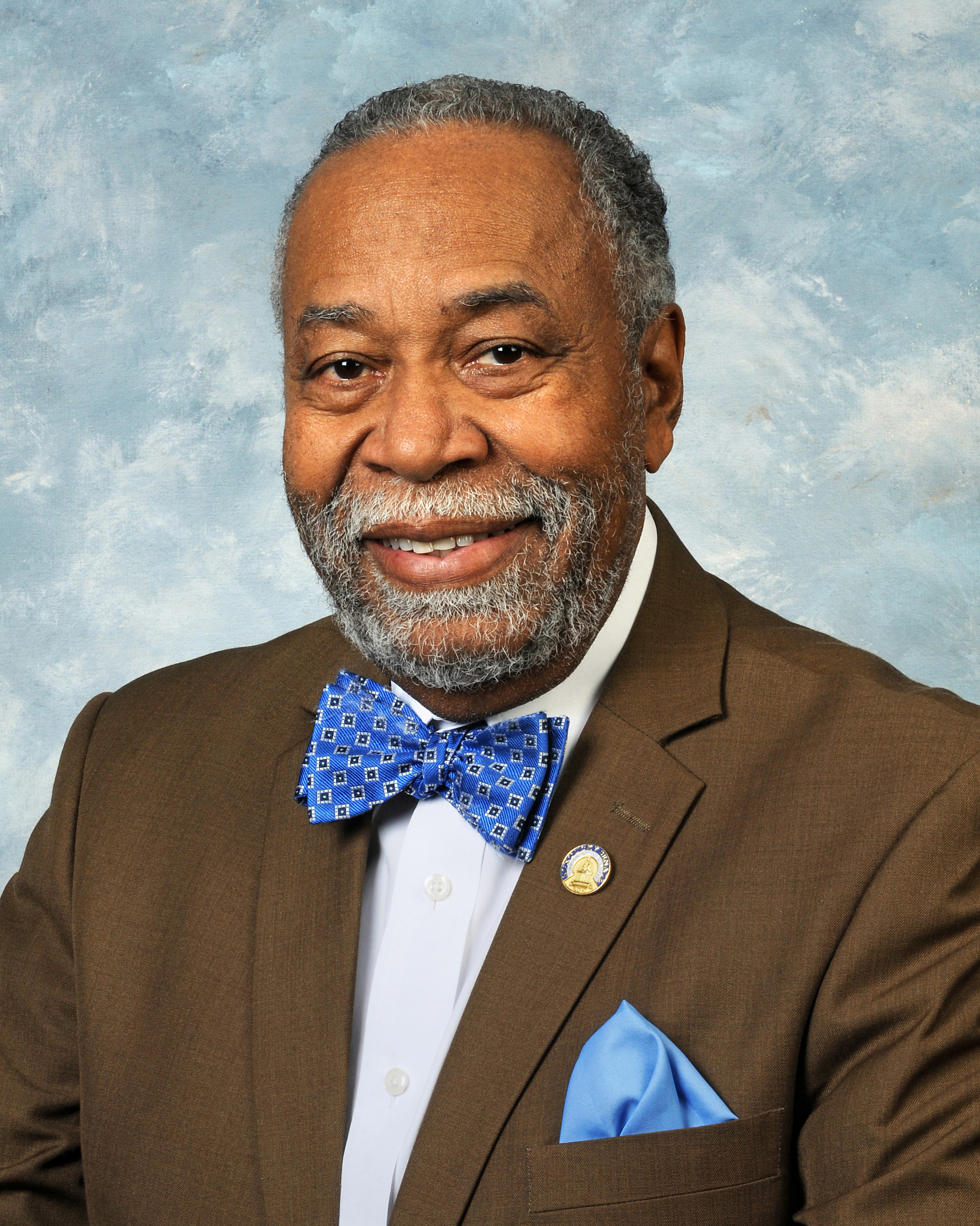
	Majority party	Minority party
Leader	Robert Stivers	Gerald A. Neal
Party	Republican	Democratic
Leader since	January 8, 2013	January 3, 2023
Leader's seat	25th – Manchester	33rd – Louisville
Last election	31	7
Seats before	32	6
Seats won	30	8
Seat change	▼2	▲2
Seats up	18	1
Races won	16	3
- Results of the elections: Democratic hold Democratic gain Republican hold No election
Senate President before election
Robert Stivers
Republican
Elected Senate President
Robert Stivers
Republican

The 2026 Kentucky Senate election was held on November 3, 2026. The Republican and Democratic primary elections were held on May 19. Half of the senate (all even-numbered seats) was up for election. Following the 2024 election, Republicans and Democrats held 31 and seven seats, respectively. However, the party switch of Robin L. Webb in May 2025 increased the Republican majority to 32 seats. The deadline for candidates to file was January 9, 2026. Republicans maintained their majority, losing two seats.

== Overview ==
Party	Candidates		Votes	%	Seats			
Party	Opposed	Unopposed	Votes	%	Before	Won	After	+/−
Republican	11	8	464,753	71.37	32	16	30	-2
Democratic	9	0	183,058	28.11	6	3	8	+2
Write-in	2	0	3,347	0.51	N/A	0	N/A	N/A
Total	22	8	651,158	100.0	38	19	38	±0

== Summary by district ==
† – Incumbent did not seek re-election

District	Incumbent	Party	Elected	Party
2	Danny Carroll	Rep	Danny Carroll	Rep
4	Robby Mills	Rep	Robby Mills	Rep
6	Lindsey Tichenor	Rep	Christian Furman	Dem
8	Gary Boswell	Rep	Gary Boswell	Rep
10	Matthew Deneen	Rep	Matthew Deneen	Rep
12	Amanda Mays Bledsoe	Rep	Amanda Mays Bledsoe	Rep
14	Jimmy Higdon†	Rep	Ben Mudd	Rep
16	Max Wise	Rep	Max Wise	Rep
18	Robin L. Webb	Rep (Note: Switched parties in May 2025.)	Robin L. Webb	Rep
20	Gex Williams	Rep	Gex Williams	Rep
22	Donald Douglas	Rep	Donald Douglas	Rep
24	Shelley Funke Frommeyer	Rep	Shelley Funke Frommeyer	Rep
26	Karen Berg	Dem	Karen Berg	Dem
28	Greg Elkins	Rep	Greg Elkins	Rep
30	Brandon Smith	Rep	Brandon Smith	Rep
32	Mike Wilson	Rep	Mike Wilson	Rep
34	Jared Carpenter	Rep	Jared Carpenter	Rep
36	Julie Raque Adams	Rep	Sarah Cole McIntosh	Dem
38	Michael J. Nemes	Rep	Michael J. Nemes	Rep

== Retirements ==
Retiring incumbents by district Democratic incumbent ran Republican incumbent ran Republican incumbent retired

One senator, a Republican, retired.

=== Republican ===
1. 14th: Jimmy Higdon (Lebanon): retired.

== Incumbents defeated ==
No incumbents lost renomination in the primary election, and two incumbents lost reelection in the general election.

=== In the primary election ===
No incumbent senators lost renomination.

=== In the general election ===
==== Republicans ====
Two Republicans lost reelection to Democrats.

1. 6th: Lindsey Tichenor (first elected in 2022) lost to Christian Furman.
2. 36th: Julie Raque Adams (first elected in 2014) lost to Sarah Cole McIntosh.

== Closest races ==
Four races were decided by 10% or lower.

District	Winner	Margin
6th	Democratic (flip)	2.39%
34th	Republican	2.41%
36th	Democratic (flip)	4.07%
20th	Republican	6.75%

== Predictions ==
Source	Ranking	As of
Sabato's Crystal Ball	Safe R	January 22, 2026
State Navigate	Safe R	October 21, 2026

== Special elections ==
=== District 37 special ===
2025 Kentucky's 37th Senate district special election
- December 16, 2025
Nominee	Gary Clemons	Calvin Leach
Party	Democratic	Republican
Popular vote	3,752	1,297
Percentage	72.6%	25.1%
- Precinct results Clemons: 50-60% 60-70% 70-80% 80-90% >90% Leach: >90% Tie: 30-40%
Senator before election
David Yates
Democratic
Elected Senator
Gary Clemons
Democratic

David Yates resigned from the senate on October 8, 2025, in order to become the county clerk of Jefferson County. A special election was held on December 16, 2025.

2025 Kentucky's 37th Senate district special election
Party	Candidate	Votes	%
Democratic	Gary Clemons	3,752	72.6
Republican	Calvin Leach	1,297	25.1
Libertarian	Wendy Higdon	121	2.3
Total votes		5,170	100.0
Democratic hold			

== District 2 ==
=== Republican primary ===
==== Candidates ====
- Danny Carroll, incumbent senator

=== General election ===
==== Results ====
2026 Kentucky's 2nd Senate district election
Party	Candidate	Votes	%
Republican	Danny Carroll (incumbent)	Unopposed	
Total votes		30,565	100.0
Republican hold			

== District 4 ==
=== Republican primary ===
==== Candidates ====
- Robby Mills, incumbent senator

=== Write-in candidates ===
- Janyna Lynn Russelburg

=== General election ===
==== Results ====
2026 Kentucky's 4th Senate district election
Party	Candidate	Votes	%
Republican	Robert M. "Robby" Mills (incumbent)	24,709	94.68
Write-in	Janyna Lynn Russelburg	1,389	5.32
Total votes		26,098	100.0
Republican hold			

== District 6 ==
=== Republican primary ===
==== Candidates ====
- Lindsey Tichenor, incumbent senator

=== Democratic primary ===
==== Candidates ====
===== Nominee =====
- Christian Furman, physician

===== Eliminated in primary =====
- Chaz Stoess

==== Endorsements ====
Christian Furman

Organizations

- 314 Action
- The Fairness Campaign

==== Results ====
Democratic primary results
Party	Candidate	Votes	%
Democratic	Christian Furman	8,425	76.5
Democratic	Chaz Stoess	2,591	23.5
Total votes		11,016	100.0

=== General election ===
==== Results ====
2026 Kentucky's 6th Senate district election
Party	Candidate	Votes	%
Democratic	Christian Furman	24,735	51.19
Republican	Lindsey Tichenor (incumbent)	23,582	48.81
Total votes		48,317	100.0
Democratic gain from Republican			

== District 8 ==
=== Republican primary ===
==== Candidates ====
- Gary Boswell, incumbent senator

=== Democratic primary ===
==== Candidates ====
- Vicki Quisenberry

=== General election ===
==== Results ====
2026 Kentucky's 8th Senate district election
Party	Candidate	Votes	%
Republican	Gary M. Boswell (incumbent)	21,825	57.04
Democratic	Vicki Quisenberry	16,437	42.96
Total votes		38,262	100.0
Republican hold			

== District 10 ==
=== Republican primary ===
==== Candidates ====
===== Nominee =====
- Matthew Deneen, incumbent senator

===== Eliminated in primary =====
- Louis Grider, perennial candidate (Note: Candidate for sheriff of Hardin County in 2010, 2014, 2018; candidate for the U.S. Senate in 2020.)

==== Results ====
Republican primary results
Party	Candidate	Votes	%
Republican	Matt Deneen (incumbent)	6,872	83.1
Republican	Louis Grider	1,394	16.9
Total votes		8,266	100.0

=== Democratic primary ===
==== Candidates ====
- Christopher Gatrost

=== General election ===
==== Results ====
2026 Kentucky's 10th Senate district election
Party	Candidate	Votes	%
Republican	Matt Deneen (incumbent)	20,522	61.31
Democratic	Christopher Gatrost	12,953	38.69
Total votes		33,475	100.0
Republican hold			

== District 12 ==
=== Republican primary ===
==== Candidates ====
- Amanda Mays Bledsoe, incumbent senator

=== Democratic primary ===
==== Candidates ====
===== Withdrawn =====
- Tyler K. Dean

=== General election ===
==== Results ====
2026 Kentucky's 12th Senate district election
Party	Candidate	Votes	%
Republican	Amanda Mays Bledsoe (incumbent)	Unopposed	
Total votes		31,531	100.0
Republican hold			

== District 14 ==
=== Republican primary ===
==== Candidates ====
===== Nominee =====
- Ben Mudd, pharmacist

===== Eliminated in primary =====
- Brian Bayers, Spencer County magistrate (2015–2019)
- Stephen Carney, Washington County magistrate (2023–present)
- Dallas Robinson, former Olympic bobsledder
- Lynn Shelburne, member of the Spencer County Board of Education (2015–present)
- Peggy Brady Smith
- James Victery

===== Declined =====
- Jimmy Higdon, incumbent senator

==== Endorsements ====
Dallas Robinson

Organizations

- Kentucky Right to Life Victory PAC

==== Results ====
Republican primary results
Party	Candidate	Votes	%
Republican	Ben Mudd	4,122	30.0
Republican	Dallas Robinson	3,759	27.3
Republican	James Victery	2,088	15.2
Republican	Stephen Carney	1,576	11.5
Republican	Lynn Shelburne	1,390	10.1
Republican	Brian Bayers	452	3.3
Republican	Peggy Brady Smith	368	2.7
Total votes		13,755	100.0

=== Democratic primary ===
==== Candidates ====
===== Nominee =====
- Carrie Gribbins Truitt, member of the Marion County Board of Education (2017–present)

===== Eliminated in primary =====
- Malcolm W. Jones

==== Results ====
Democratic primary results
Party	Candidate	Votes	%
Democratic	Carrie Gribbins Truitt	6,808	73.4
Democratic	Malcolm W. Jones	2,469	26.6
Total votes		9,277	100.0

=== General election ===
==== Results ====
2026 Kentucky's 14th Senate district election
Party	Candidate	Votes	%
Republican	Ben Mudd	25,927	65.80
Democratic	Carrie Gribbins Truitt	13,473	34.20
Total votes		39,400	100.0
Republican hold			

== District 16 ==
=== Republican primary ===
==== Candidates ====
- Max Wise, incumbent senator

=== General election ===
==== Results ====
2026 Kentucky's 16th Senate district election
Party	Candidate	Votes	%
Republican	George Maxwell "Max" Wise (incumbent)	Unopposed	
Total votes		28,142	100.0
Republican hold			

== District 18 ==
=== Republican primary ===
==== Candidates ====
- Robin L. Webb, incumbent senator

=== General election ===
==== Results ====
2026 Kentucky's 18th Senate district election
Party	Candidate	Votes	%
Republican	Robin L. Webb (incumbent)	Unopposed	
Total votes		24,565	100.0
Republican hold			

== District 20 ==
=== Republican primary ===
==== Candidates ====
- Gex Williams, incumbent senator

=== Democratic primary ===
==== Candidates ====
- Stella R. Pollard

=== General election ===
==== Results ====
2026 Kentucky's 20th Senate district election
Party	Candidate	Votes	%
Republican	Gex "jay" Williams (incumbent)	20,793	53.38
Democratic	Stella R. Pollard	18,163	46.62
Total votes		38,956	100.0
Republican hold			

== District 22 ==
=== Republican primary ===
==== Candidates ====
- Donald Douglas, incumbent senator

=== Write-in candidates ===
- Michael Wieland French

=== General election ===
==== Results ====
2026 Kentucky's 22nd Senate district election
Party	Candidate	Votes	%
Republican	Donald R. Douglas (incumbent)	24,795	92.68
Write-in	Michael Wieland French	1,958	7.32
Total votes		26,753	100.0
Republican hold			

== District 24 ==
=== Republican primary ===
==== Candidates ====
- Shelley Funke Frommeyer, incumbent senator

=== Democratic primary ===
==== Candidates ====
- Joshua Baker

=== General election ===
==== Results ====
2026 Kentucky's 24th Senate district election
Party	Candidate	Votes	%
Republican	Shelley "Funke" Frommeyer (incumbent)	24,113	56.10
Democratic	Joshua Baker	18,866	43.90
Total votes		42,979	100.0
Republican hold			

== District 26 ==
=== Democratic primary ===
==== Candidates ====
- Karen Berg, incumbent senator

=== Republican primary ===
==== Candidates ====
===== Nominee =====
- Everett C. Corley, perennial candidate (Note: Candidate for this district in 2022, the 43rd house district in 2018, and Kentucky's 3rd congressional district in 2016.)

===== Eliminated in primary =====
- Sheeba Jolly, candidate for the 36th district in 2018

==== Results ====
Republican primary results
Party	Candidate	Votes	%
Republican	Everett C. Corley	4,960	82.4
Republican	Sheeba Jolly	1,058	17.6
Total votes		6,018	100.0

=== General election ===
==== Results ====
2026 Kentucky's 26th Senate district election
Party	Candidate	Votes	%
Democratic	Karen A. Berg (incumbent)	30,081	68.23
Republican	Everett C. Corley	14,009	31.77
Total votes		44,090	100.0
Democratic hold			

== District 28 ==
=== Republican primary ===
==== Candidates ====
- Greg Elkins, incumbent senator

=== General election ===
==== Results ====
2026 Kentucky's 28th Senate district election
Party	Candidate	Votes	%
Republican	Greg Elkins (incumbent)	Unopposed	
Total votes		25,524	100.0
Republican hold			

== District 30 ==
=== Republican primary ===
==== Candidates ====
===== Nominee =====
- Brandon Smith, incumbent senator

===== Eliminated in primary =====
- Bill Wesley, state representative from the 91st district (2021–present)

==== Endorsements ====
Brandon D. Smith

Organizations

- Kentucky Chamber of Commerce
- NRA Political Victory Fund

==== Results ====
Republican primary results
Party	Candidate	Votes	%
Republican	Brandon D. Smith (incumbent)	7,275	53.8
Republican	Billy Wesley	6,248	46.2
Total votes		13,523	100.0

=== General election ===
==== Results ====
2026 Kentucky's 30th Senate district election
Party	Candidate	Votes	%
Republican	Brandon D. Smith (incumbent)	Unopposed	
Total votes		25,074	100.0
Republican hold			

== District 32 ==
=== Republican primary ===
==== Candidates ====
- Mike Wilson, incumbent senator

=== General election ===
==== Results ====
2026 Kentucky's 32nd Senate district election
Party	Candidate	Votes	%
Republican	Mike Wilson (incumbent)	Unopposed	
Total votes		25,813	100.0
Republican hold			

== District 34 ==
=== Republican primary ===
==== Candidates ====
- Jared Carpenter, incumbent senator

=== Democratic primary ===
==== Candidates ====
- Jessica D. McIntosh

=== General election ===
==== Results ====
2026 Kentucky's 34th Senate district election
Party	Candidate	Votes	%
Republican	Jared K. Carpenter (incumbent)	22,660	51.20
Democratic	Jessica D. McIntosh	21,595	48.80
Total votes		44,255	100.0
Republican hold			

== District 36 ==
=== Republican primary ===
==== Candidates ====
===== Nominee =====
- Julie Raque Adams, incumbent senator

===== Eliminated in primary =====
- David J. Farley

==== Endorsements ====
Julie Raque Adams

Organizations

- Kentucky Chamber of Commerce

==== Results ====
Republican primary results
Party	Candidate	Votes	%
Republican	Julie Raque Adams (incumbent)	9,126	80.4
Republican	David J. Farley	2,220	19.6
Total votes		11,346	100.0

=== Democratic primary ===
==== Candidates ====
===== Nominee =====
- Sarah Cole McIntosh, member of the Jefferson County Board of Education (2021–2025)

===== Eliminated in primary =====
- Luke Whitehead, former University of Louisville basketball player

==== Results ====
Democratic primary results
Party	Candidate	Votes	%
Democratic	Sarah Cole McIntosh	7,411	57.9
Democratic	Luke Whitehead	5,391	42.1
Total votes		12,802	100.0

=== General election ===
==== Results ====
2026 Kentucky's 36th Senate district election
Party	Candidate	Votes	%
Democratic	Sarah Cole McIntosh	26,755	52.03
Republican	Julie Raque Adams (incumbent)	24,663	47.97
Total votes		51,418	100.0
Democratic gain from Republican			

== District 38 ==
=== Republican primary ===
==== Candidates ====
- Michael J. Nemes, incumbent senator

=== General election ===
==== Results ====
2026 Kentucky's 38th Senate district election
Party	Candidate	Votes	%
Republican	Mike Nemes (incumbent)	Unopposed	
Total votes		25,941	100.0
Republican hold			

== See also ==
- 2026 Kentucky elections
  - 2026 Kentucky House of Representatives election
  - 2026 United States Senate election in Kentucky
  - 2026 United States House of Representatives elections in Kentucky
