= 2022 Kentucky Senate election =

- November 8, 2022

19 out of 38 seats in the Kentucky Senate 20 seats needed for a majority
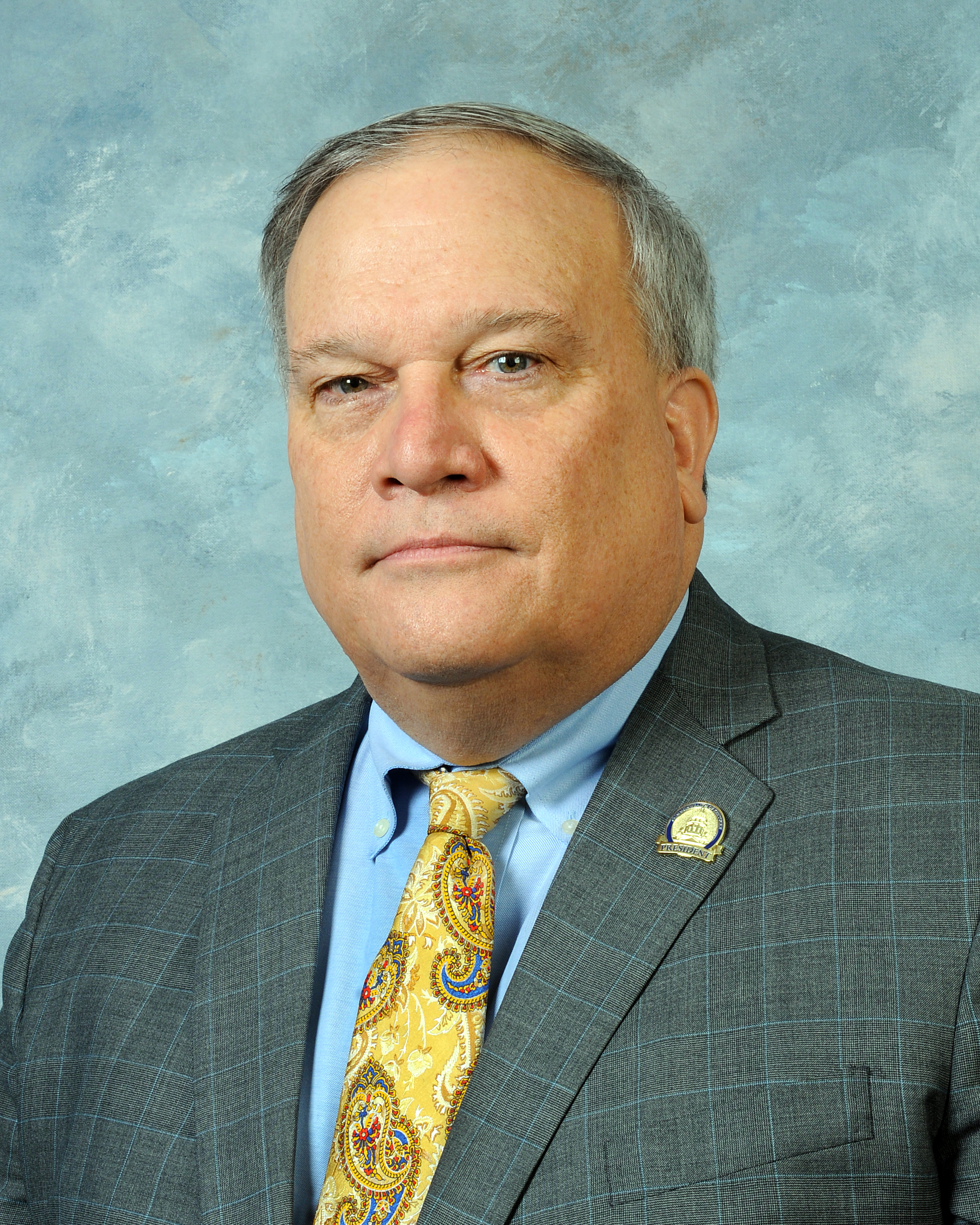

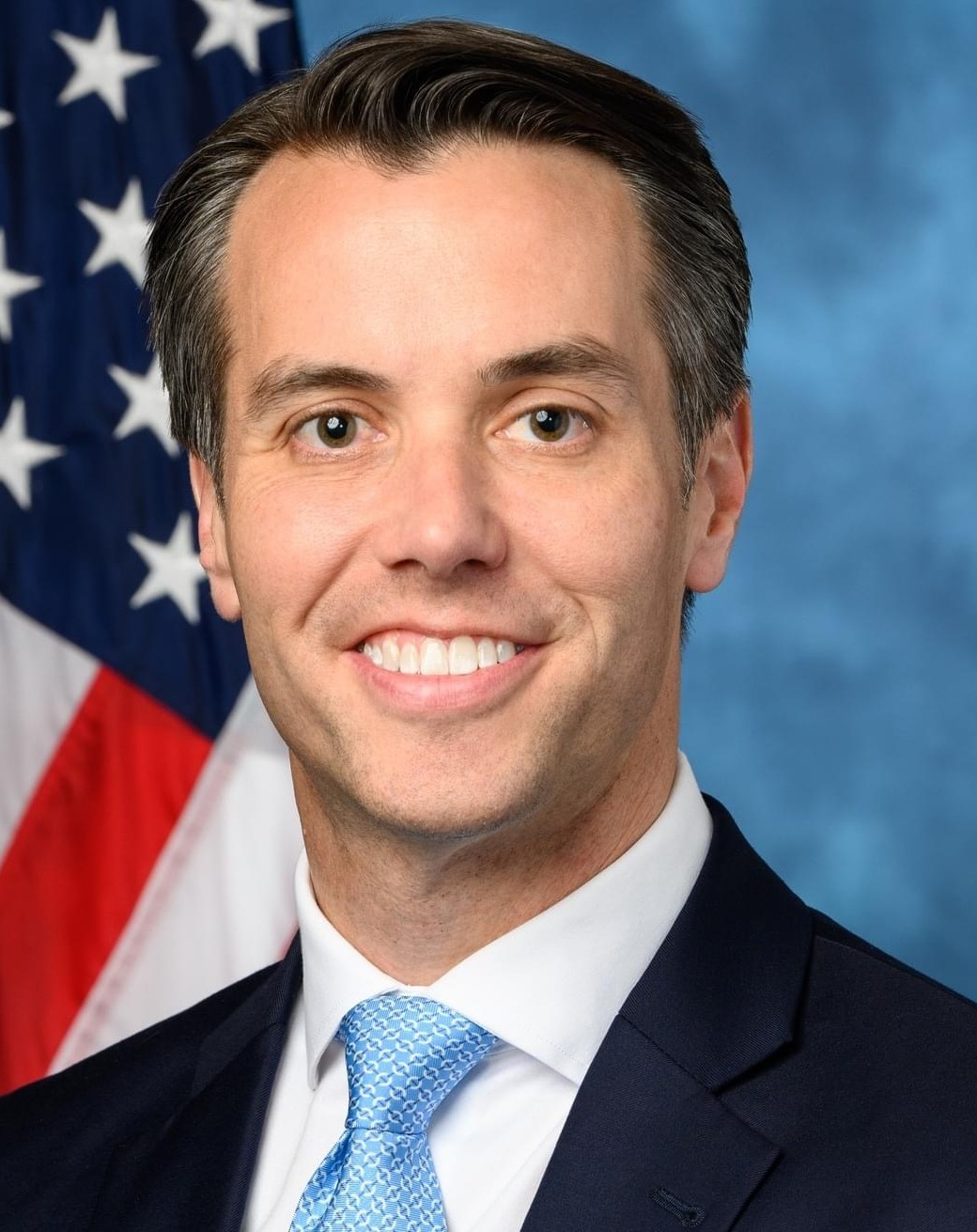
| | Majority party | Minority party |
|---|---|---|
| Leader | Robert Stivers | Morgan McGarvey |
| Party | Republican | Democratic |
| Leader since | January 8, 2013 | January 8, 2019 |
| Leader's seat | 25th – Manchester | 19th – Louisville |
| Last election | 30 | 8 |
| Seats won | 31 | 7 |
| Seat change | ▲1 | ▼1 |
| Seats up | 16 | 3 |
| Races won | 17 | 2 |
- Republican hold Republican gain Democratic hold No election 50–60% 60–70% 70–80% >90% 60–70% >90%
Senate President before election
Robert Stivers
Republican
Elected Senate President
Robert Stivers
Republican

The 2022 Kentucky Senate election was held on November 8, 2022. The Republican and Democratic primary elections were held on May 17. Half of the senate (all even-numbered seats) were up for election. Republicans increased their majority in the chamber, gaining one seat.

A numbered map of the senate districts can be viewed here.

== Overview ==
| Party | Candidates | | Votes | % | Seats | | | |
| Party | Opposed | Unopposed | Votes | % | Before | Won | After | +/− |
|---|---|---|---|---|---|---|---|---|
| Republican | 10 | 8 | 500,535 | 75.48 | 30 | 17 | 31 | +1 |
| Democratic | 8 | 1 | 160,236 | 24.16 | 8 | 2 | 7 | -1 |
| Write-in | 2 | 0 | 2,348 | 0.35 | 0 | 0 | 0 | - |
| Total | 20 | 9 | 663,119 | 100.00 | 38 | 19 | 38 | ±0 |
Source: Kentucky Secretary of State

== Retiring incumbents ==
A total of five senators (one Democrat and four Republicans) retired, none of whom ran for other offices. Additionally, C. B. Embry resigned from the chamber in September 2022.

=== Democratic ===
1. 10th: Dennis Parrett (Elizabethtown): Retired.

=== Republican ===
1. 8th: Matt Castlen (Owensboro): Retired.
2. 12th: Alice Forgy Kerr (Lexington): Retired.
3. 20th: Paul Hornback (Shelbyville): Retired.
4. 24th: Wil Schroder (Wilder): Retired.

== Defeated incumbents ==
No incumbents lost renomination or reelection.

== Summary by district ==
Certified results by the Kentucky Secretary of State are available online for the primary election and general election.

| District | Incumbent | Party | Elected | Party |
|---|---|---|---|---|
| 2 | Danny Carroll | Rep | Danny Carroll | Rep |
| 4 | Robby Mills | Rep | Robby Mills | Rep |
| 6 | Vacant | | Lindsey Tichenor | Rep |
| 8 | Matt Castlen | Rep | Gary Boswell | Rep |
| 10 | Dennis Parrett | Dem | Matthew Deneen | Rep |
| 12 | Alice Forgy Kerr | Rep | Amanda Mays Bledsoe | Rep |
| 14 | Jimmy Higdon | Rep | Jimmy Higdon | Rep |
| 16 | Max Wise | Rep | Max Wise | Rep |
| 18 | Robin L. Webb | Dem | Robin L. Webb | Dem |
| 20 | Paul Hornback | Rep | Gex Williams | Rep |
| 22 | Donald Douglas | Rep | Donald Douglas | Rep |
| 24 | Wil Schroder | Rep | Shelley Funke Frommeyer | Rep |
| 26 | Karen Berg | Dem | Karen Berg | Dem |
| 28 | Ralph Alvarado | Rep | Ralph Alvarado | Rep |
| 30 | Brandon Smith | Rep | Brandon Smith | Rep |
| 32 | Mike Wilson | Rep | Mike Wilson | Rep |
| 34 | Jared Carpenter | Rep | Jared Carpenter | Rep |
| 36 | Julie Raque Adams | Rep | Julie Raque Adams | Rep |
| 38 | Michael J. Nemes | Rep | Michael J. Nemes | Rep |

== Crossover seats ==
=== Democratic ===
Two districts voted for Donald Trump in 2020 but had Democratic incumbents:

| District | | Incumbent | | |
| # | Trump margin of victory in 2020 | Member | Party | Incumbent margin of victory in 2018 |
|---|---|---|---|---|
| 10 | R+24.20 | Dennis Parrett | Democratic | Unopposed |
| 18 | R+44.78 | Robin L. Webb | Democratic | D+15.54 |

=== Republican ===
None.

== Closest races ==
There were no seats where the margin of victory was under 10%.

== Predictions ==
| Source | Ranking | As of |
|---|---|---|
| Sabato's Crystal Ball | Safe R | May 19, 2022 |

== Special elections ==
=== District 22 special ===
County results: Douglas 70–80% Bukulmez 50–60%

Donald Douglas was elected in November 2021 following the death of Tom Buford.

2021 Kentucky Senate 22nd district special election
| Party | Candidate | Votes | % |
|---|---|---|---|
| Republican | Donald Douglas | 9,733 | 71.5 |
| Democratic | Helen Bukulmez | 3,725 | 27.4 |
| Write-in | Sindicat Dunn | 150 | 1.1 |
| Total votes | | 13,608 | 100.0 |
| Republican hold | | | |

== District 2 ==
Incumbent senator Danny Carroll won reelection unopposed.

=== Republican primary ===
==== Candidates ====
===== Nominee =====
- Danny Carroll, incumbent senator

=== General election ===
==== Results ====
2022 Kentucky Senate 2nd district election
| Party | Candidate | Votes | % |
|---|---|---|---|
| Republican | Danny Carroll | Unopposed | |
| Total votes | | 34,951 | 100.0 |
| Republican hold | | | |

== District 4 ==
Incumbent senator Robby Mills won reelection, defeating primary and general election challengers.

=== Democratic primary ===
==== Candidates ====
===== Nominee =====
- Bruce Pritchett

=== Republican primary ===
==== Candidates ====
===== Nominee =====
- Robby Mills, incumbent senator

===== Eliminated in primary =====
- Roxan Lynn Ashby

==== Results ====
Republican primary results
| Party | Candidate | Votes | % |
|---|---|---|---|
| Republican | Robby Mills | 4,007 | 78.0 |
| Republican | Roxan Lynn Ashby | 1,132 | 22.0 |
| Total votes | | 5,139 | 100.0 |

=== General election ===
==== Results ====
2022 Kentucky Senate 4th district election
| Party | Candidate | Votes | % |
|---|---|---|---|
| Republican | Robby Mills | 25,141 | 66.6 |
| Democratic | Bruce Pritchett | 12,585 | 33.4 |
| Total votes | | 37,726 | 100.0 |
| Republican hold | | | |

== District 6 ==
Incumbent senator C. B. Embry resigned from the senate in September 2022. He was succeeded by Republican Lindsey Tichenor.

=== Republican primary ===
==== Candidates ====
===== Nominee =====
- Lindsey Tichenor

===== Eliminated in primary =====
- Bill Ferko

==== Results ====
Precinct results: Tichenor: 50–60%; 60–70%; 70–80%; Ferko: 50–60%; 60–70%; 80–90%

Republican primary results
| Party | Candidate | Votes | % |
|---|---|---|---|
| Republican | Lindsey Tichenor | 6,601 | 54.0 |
| Republican | Bill Ferko | 5,616 | 46.0 |
| Total votes | | 12,217 | 100.0 |

=== General election ===
==== Results ====
2022 Kentucky Senate 6th district election
| Party | Candidate | Votes | % |
|---|---|---|---|
| Republican | Lindsey Tichenor | 31,111 | 94.5 |
| Write-in | Brian J. Easley | 1,797 | 5.5 |
| Total votes | | 32,908 | 100.0 |
| Republican hold | | | |

== District 8 ==
Incumbent senator Matt Castlen did not seek reelection. He was succeeded by Republican Gary Boswell.

=== Republican primary ===
==== Candidates ====
===== Nominee =====
- Gary Boswell

=== General election ===
==== Results ====
2022 Kentucky Senate 8th district election
| Party | Candidate | Votes | % |
|---|---|---|---|
| Republican | Gary Boswell | Unopposed | |
| Total votes | | 29,630 | 100.0 |
| Republican hold | | | |

== District 10 ==
Incumbent Democratic senator Dennis Parrett did not seek reelection. He was succeeded by Republican Matthew Deneen. This was the only seat to change parties in 2022.

=== Republican primary ===
==== Candidates ====
===== Nominee =====
- Matthew Deneen

=== General election ===
==== Results ====
2022 Kentucky Senate 10th district election
| Party | Candidate | Votes | % |
|---|---|---|---|
| Republican | Matthew Deneen | Unopposed | |
| Total votes | | 23,606 | 100.0 |
| Republican gain from Democratic | | | |

== District 12 ==
Incumbent senator Alice Forgy Kerr did not seek reelection. She was succeeded by Republican Amanda Mays Bledsoe.

=== Democratic primary ===
==== Candidates ====
===== Nominee =====
- Bill O’Brien

=== Republican primary ===
==== Candidates ====
===== Nominee =====
- Amanda Mays Bledsoe

=== General election ===
==== Results ====
2022 Kentucky Senate 12th district election
| Party | Candidate | Votes | % |
|---|---|---|---|
| Republican | Amanda Mays Bledsoe | 29,181 | 60.5 |
| Democratic | Bill O’Brien | 19,046 | 39.5 |
| Total votes | | 48,227 | 100.0 |
| Republican hold | | | |

== District 14 ==
Incumbent senator Jimmy Higdon won reelection unopposed.

=== Republican primary ===
==== Candidates ====
===== Nominee =====
- Jimmy Higdon, incumbent senator

=== General election ===
==== Results ====
2022 Kentucky Senate 14th district election
| Party | Candidate | Votes | % |
|---|---|---|---|
| Republican | Jimmy Higdon | Unopposed | |
| Total votes | | 33,142 | 100.0 |
| Republican hold | | | |

== District 16 ==
Incumbent senator Max Wise won reelection unopposed.

=== Republican primary ===
==== Candidates ====
===== Nominee =====
- Max Wise, incumbent senator

=== General election ===
==== Results ====
2022 Kentucky Senate 16th district election
| Party | Candidate | Votes | % |
|---|---|---|---|
| Republican | Max Wise | Unopposed | |
| Total votes | | 31,887 | 100.0 |
| Republican hold | | | |

== District 18 ==
Incumbent senator Robin L. Webb won reelection unopposed.

=== Democratic primary ===
==== Candidates ====
===== Nominee =====
- Robin L. Webb, incumbent senator

=== General election ===
==== Results ====
2022 Kentucky Senate 18th district election
| Party | Candidate | Votes | % |
|---|---|---|---|
| Democratic | Robin L. Webb | Unopposed | |
| Total votes | | 23,308 | 100.0 |
| Democratic hold | | | |

== District 20 ==
2022 Kentucky Senate 20th district election
- November 8, 2022
| Nominee | Gex Williams | Teresa Azbill Barton |
| Party | Republican | Democratic |
| Popular vote | 22,166 | 17,206 |
| Percentage | 56.3% | 43.7% |
- Precinct results Williams: 50-60% 60-70% 70-80% 80-90% Barton: 50-60% 60-70% 70-80% 80-90%
Senator before election
Paul Hornback
Republican
Elected Senator
Gex Williams
Republican

Incumbent senator Paul Hornback did not seek reelection. He was succeeded by Republican Gex Williams.

=== Democratic primary ===
==== Candidates ====
===== Nominee =====
- Teresa Azbill Barton

=== Republican primary ===
==== Candidates ====
===== Nominee =====
- Gex Williams

===== Eliminated in primary =====
- Phyllis Sparks
- Calen Studler
- Mike Templeman

==== Results ====
Republican primary results
| Party | Candidate | Votes | % |
|---|---|---|---|
| Republican | Gex Williams | 3,332 | 42.3 |
| Republican | Phyllis Sparks | 1,836 | 23.3 |
| Republican | Calen Studler | 1,452 | 18.4 |
| Republican | Mike Templeman | 1,263 | 16.0 |
| Total votes | | 7,883 | 100.0 |

=== General election ===
==== Results ====
2022 Kentucky Senate 20th district election
| Party | Candidate | Votes | % |
|---|---|---|---|
| Republican | Gex Williams | 22,166 | 56.3 |
| Democratic | Teresa Azbill Barton | 17,206 | 43.7 |
| Total votes | | 39,372 | 100.0 |
| Republican hold | | | |

== District 22 ==
Incumbent senator Donald Douglas won reelection, defeating primary and general election challengers.

=== Democratic primary ===
==== Candidates ====
===== Nominee =====
- Chuck Eddy

=== Republican primary ===
==== Candidates ====
===== Nominee =====
- Donald Douglas, incumbent senator

===== Eliminated in primary =====
- Andrew Cooperrider

==== Results ====
Republican primary results
| Party | Candidate | Votes | % |
|---|---|---|---|
| Republican | Donald Douglas | 6,114 | 55.8 |
| Republican | Andrew Cooperrider | 4,840 | 44.2 |
| Total votes | | 10,954 | 100.0 |

=== General election ===
==== Results ====
2022 Kentucky Senate 22nd district election
| Party | Candidate | Votes | % |
|---|---|---|---|
| Republican | Donald Douglas | 23,486 | 59.7 |
| Democratic | Chuck Eddy | 15,843 | 40.3 |
| Total votes | | 39,329 | 100.0 |
| Republican hold | | | |

== District 24 ==
Incumbent senator Wil Schroder did not seek reelection. He was succeeded by Republican Shelley Funke Frommeyer.

=== Democratic primary ===
==== Candidates ====
===== Nominee =====
- Rene Heinrich

=== Republican primary ===
==== Candidates ====
===== Nominee =====
- Shelley Funke Frommeyer

===== Eliminated in primary =====
- Jessica Neal
- Chris Robinson

==== Results ====
Republican primary results
| Party | Candidate | Votes | % |
|---|---|---|---|
| Republican | Shelley Funke Frommeyer | 4,094 | 38.6 |
| Republican | Jessica Neal | 3,787 | 35.7 |
| Republican | Chris Robinson | 2,731 | 25.7 |
| Total votes | | 10,612 | 100.0 |

=== General election ===
==== Results ====
2022 Kentucky Senate 24th district election
| Party | Candidate | Votes | % |
|---|---|---|---|
| Republican | Shelley Funke Frommeyer | 27,346 | 61.7 |
| Democratic | Rene Heinrich | 16,960 | 38.3 |
| Total votes | | 44,306 | 100.0 |
| Republican hold | | | |

== District 26 ==
Incumbent senator Karen Berg won reelection, defeating Republican James Peden.

=== Democratic primary ===
==== Candidates ====
===== Nominee =====
- Karen Berg, incumbent senator

=== Republican primary ===
==== Candidates ====
===== Nominee =====
- James Peden

===== Eliminated in primary =====
- Everett Corley
- Mark Hignite Downer

==== Results ====
Republican primary results
| Party | Candidate | Votes | % |
|---|---|---|---|
| Republican | James Peden | 2,774 | 42.6 |
| Republican | Mark Hignite Downer | 2,368 | 36.4 |
| Republican | Everett Corley | 1,370 | 21.0 |
| Total votes | | 6,512 | 100.0 |

=== General election ===
==== Results ====
2022 Kentucky Senate 26th district election
| Party | Candidate | Votes | % |
|---|---|---|---|
| Democratic | Karen Berg | 28,850 | 60.5 |
| Republican | James Peden | 18,859 | 39.5 |
| Total votes | | 47,709 | 100.0 |
| Democratic hold | | | |

== District 28 ==
Incumbent senator Ralph Alvarado won reelection, defeating write-in candidate Joshua D. Buckman.

=== Republican primary ===
==== Candidates ====
===== Nominee =====
- Ralph Alvarado, incumbent senator

=== General election ===
==== Results ====
2022 Kentucky Senate 28th district election
| Party | Candidate | Votes | % |
|---|---|---|---|
| Republican | Ralph Alvarado | 27,097 | 98.0 |
| Write-in | Joshua D. Buckman | 551 | 2.0 |
| Total votes | | 27,648 | 100.0 |
| Republican hold | | | |

== District 30 ==
Incumbent senator Brandon Smith won reelection, defeating Democratic candidate Sid Allen.

=== Democratic primary ===
==== Candidates ====
===== Nominee =====
- Sid Allen

===== Eliminated in primary =====
- Terry V. Salyer

==== Results ====
Democratic primary results
| Party | Candidate | Votes | % |
|---|---|---|---|
| Democratic | Sid Allen | 7,148 | 56.7 |
| Democratic | Terry V. Salyer | 5,468 | 43.3 |
| Total votes | | 12,616 | 100.0 |

=== Republican primary ===
==== Candidates ====
===== Nominee =====
- Brandon Smith, incumbent senator

=== General election ===
==== Results ====
2022 Kentucky Senate 30th district election
| Party | Candidate | Votes | % |
|---|---|---|---|
| Republican | Brandon Smith | 25,581 | 73.7 |
| Democratic | Sid Allen | 9,116 | 26.3 |
| Total votes | | 34,697 | 100.0 |
| Republican hold | | | |

== District 32 ==
Incumbent senator Mike Wilson won reelection unopposed.

=== Republican primary ===
==== Candidates ====
===== Nominee =====
- Mike Wilson, incumbent senator

=== General election ===
==== Results ====
2022 Kentucky Senate 32nd district election
| Party | Candidate | Votes | % |
|---|---|---|---|
| Republican | Mike Wilson | Unopposed | |
| Total votes | | 28,682 | 100.0 |
| Republican hold | | | |

== District 34 ==
Incumbent senator Jared Carpenter won reelection, defeating primary and general election challengers.

=== Democratic primary ===
==== Candidates ====
===== Nominee =====
- Susan Cintra

=== Republican primary ===
==== Candidates ====
===== Nominee =====
- Jared Carpenter, incumbent senator

===== Eliminated in primary =====
- Rhonda Goode

==== Results ====
Republican primary results
| Party | Candidate | Votes | % |
|---|---|---|---|
| Republican | Jared Carpenter | 6,086 | 75.6 |
| Republican | Rhonda Goode | 1,964 | 24.4 |
| Total votes | | 8,050 | 100.0 |

=== General election ===
==== Results ====
2022 Kentucky Senate 34th district election
| Party | Candidate | Votes | % |
|---|---|---|---|
| Republican | Jared Carpenter | 25,049 | 59.1 |
| Democratic | Susan Cintra | 17,322 | 40.9 |
| Total votes | | 42,371 | 100.0 |
| Republican hold | | | |

== District 36 ==
Incumbent senator Julie Raque Adams won reelection unopposed.

=== Republican primary ===
==== Candidates ====
===== Nominee =====
- Julie Raque Adams, incumbent senator

=== General election ===
==== Results ====
2022 Kentucky Senate 36th district election
| Party | Candidate | Votes | % |
|---|---|---|---|
| Republican | Julie Raque Adams | Unopposed | |
| Total votes | | 36,851 | 100.0 |
| Republican hold | | | |

== District 38 ==
Incumbent senator Michael J. Nemes won reelection unopposed.

=== Republican primary ===
==== Candidates ====
===== Nominee =====
- Michael J. Nemes, incumbent senator

=== General election ===
==== Results ====
2022 Kentucky Senate 38th district election
| Party | Candidate | Votes | % |
|---|---|---|---|
| Republican | Michael J. Nemes | Unopposed | |
| Total votes | | 26,769 | 100.0 |
| Republican hold | | | |

== See also ==
- 2022 Kentucky elections
  - 2022 Kentucky House of Representatives election
  - 2022 United States Senate election in Kentucky
  - 2022 United States House of Representatives elections in Kentucky
