= Sarah Cole McIntosh =

American politician

Member-elect of the Kentucky Senate from the 36th district
- Assuming office January 1, 2027
- Succeeding: Julie Raque Adams

Personal details
- Party: Democratic

Sarah Cole McIntosh is an American politician. She is the Democratic member-elect of the Kentucky Senate from the 36th district, defeating Julie Raque Adams. Prior to her victory, she was a social studies teacher at Jefferson County Public Schools, where she was a Board of Education member from 2021 to 2025.

== Biography ==
Sarah Cole McIntosh graduated from Doss High School and later studied at the University of Louisville, where she obtained a bachelor's degree in history and a master's degree in teaching. She was a teacher at the Jefferson County Public Schools, teaching social studies in middle and high school. She later retired as teacher, but remained with the JCPS as a parent–teacher association volunteer.

McIntosh was a social studies teacher at the Jefferson County Public Schools, teaching at middle and high schools. She later retired as teacher, but remained with the JCPS as a parent–teacher association volunteer, as well as a School-Based Decision Making Council member.

McIntosh ran in the 2020 Jefferson County Public Schools Board of Education election in District 7, defeating Tammy Stewart 62.6% to 36.1%; this was her first political candidacy. Her term began on January 1, 2021. McIntosh recalled about her time as a board member: "I simultaneously angered the very far left and the very far right, and so that let me know that I was in the area of ideology of the majority of the people in my community". She was not a candidate for re-election in 2024, and her term ended on January 6, 2025.

McIntosh later ran in the 2026 election as a Democratic candidate for Kentucky's 36th Senate district, which had not been held by a Democrat for three decades, challenging incumbent Julie Raque Adams. McIntosh cited extra funding for public schools as a planned legislative priority, and cited childcare, education, and healthcare as campaign priorities. She won the Democratic primary in May, defeating basketball player Luke Whitehead 57.9% to 42.1%. She defeated Adams in the November general election, 52.0% to 48.0%.

McIntosh lives in Middletown with her husband Rusty and two children.
