= Kentucky's 16th Senate district =

American legislative district

Kentucky's 16th State Senate district
Senator
Max Wise; R–Campbellsville
since January 1, 2015
- Registration: 61.1% Republican; 29.8% Democratic; 8.5% No party preference
- Demographics: 88.2% White; 4.5% Black; 3.5% Hispanic; 1.1% Asian; 0.1% Native American; 0.1% Hawaiian/Pacific Islander; 0.1% Other; 2.5% Multiracial
- Population (2023): 120,739
- Registered voters (2025): 92,701

Kentucky's 16th Senatorial district is one of 38 districts in the Kentucky Senate. Located in the southern part of the state, it comprises the counties of Adair, Allen, Metcalfe, Monroe, Taylor, and part of Warren. It has been represented by Max Wise (R–Campbellsville) since 2015. As of 2023, the district had a population of 120,739.

From 1987 to 2012, the district was represented by David L. Williams, who was president of the Senate from 2000 to 2012.

== Voter registration ==
On January 1, 2025, the district had 92,701 registered voters, who were registered with the following parties.

Party	Registration	
Party	Voters	%
Republican	56,681	61.14
Democratic	27,628	29.80
Independent	3,863	4.17
Libertarian	385	0.42
Green	73	0.08
Constitution	52	0.06
Socialist Workers	17	0.02
Reform	8	0.01
"Other"	3,994	4.31
Total	92,701	100.00
Source: Kentucky State Board of Elections

== Election results from statewide races ==
=== 2014 – 2020 ===
Year	Office	Results (Note: Figures presented in this table are calculated by summing precinct election results published by the Kentucky State Board of Elections, using precinct data that list each precinct's senatorial district.)
2014	Senator	McConnell 67.6 - 28.7%
2015	Governor	Bevin 66.8 - 30.4%
2015	Secretary of State	Knipper 60.8 - 39.2%
2015	Attorney General	Westerfield 66.3 - 33.7%
2015	Auditor of Public Accounts	Harmon 67.0 - 33.0%
2015	State Treasurer	Ball 74.4 - 25.6%
2015	Commissioner of Agriculture	Quarles 76.1 - 23.9%
2016	President	Trump 80.6 - 16.5%
2016	Senator	Paul 72.4 - 27.6%
2019	Governor	Bevin 67.2 - 30.9%
2019	Secretary of State	Adams 71.9 - 28.1%
2019	Attorney General	Cameron 77.1 - 22.9%
2019	Auditor of Public Accounts	Harmon 76.9 - 21.1%
2019	State Treasurer	Ball 79.8 - 20.2%
2019	Commissioner of Agriculture	Quarles 77.9 - 20.0%
2020	President	Trump 81.8 - 17.0%
2020	Senator	McConnell 75.3 - 19.8%
2020	Amendment 1	Yes 56.6 - 43.4%
2020	Amendment 2	No 67.5 - 32.5%

=== 2022 – present ===
Year	Office	Results
2022	Senator	Paul 74.3 - 25.7%
2022	Amendment 1	Yes 55.6 - 44.4%
2022	Amendment 2	Yes 58.4 - 41.6%
2023	Governor	Cameron 60.4 - 39.6%
2023	Secretary of State	Adams 73.1 - 26.8%
2023	Attorney General	Coleman 71.7 - 28.3%
2023	Auditor of Public Accounts	Ball 74.0 - 26.0%
2023	State Treasurer	Metcalf 70.8 - 29.2%
2023	Commissioner of Agriculture	Shell 73.5 - 26.5%
2024	President	Trump 76.4 - 22.4%
2024	Amendment 1	Yes 67.0 - 33.0%
2024	Amendment 2	No 64.4 - 35.6%

== List of members representing the district ==
Member	Party	Years	Electoral history	District location
James A. Hicks (Albany)	Republican	January 1, 1970 – January 1, 1974	Elected in 1969. Retired.	1964–1972
James A. Hicks (Albany)	Republican	January 1, 1970 – January 1, 1974	Elected in 1969. Retired.	1972–1974
Doug Moseley (Columbia)	Republican	January 1, 1974 – January 1, 1987	Elected in 1973. Reelected in 1977. Reelected in 1981. Retired.	1974–1984
Doug Moseley (Columbia)	Republican	January 1, 1974 – January 1, 1987	Elected in 1973. Reelected in 1977. Reelected in 1981. Retired.	1984–1993; Adair, Casey, Cumberland, Green, Metcalfe, Russell, and Taylor Counties.
David Williams (Burkesville)	Republican	January 1, 1987 – November 2, 2012	Elected in 1986. Reelected in 1990. Reelected in 1994. Reelected in 1998. Reelected in 2002. Reelected in 2006. Reelected in 2010. Resigned to become a Judge of the 40th Circuit Court.	1984–1993; Adair, Casey, Cumberland, Green, Metcalfe, Russell, and Taylor Counties.
David Williams (Burkesville)	Republican	January 1, 1987 – November 2, 2012	Elected in 1986. Reelected in 1990. Reelected in 1994. Reelected in 1998. Reelected in 2002. Reelected in 2006. Reelected in 2010. Resigned to become a Judge of the 40th Circuit Court.	1993–1997
David Williams (Burkesville)	Republican	January 1, 1987 – November 2, 2012	Elected in 1986. Reelected in 1990. Reelected in 1994. Reelected in 1998. Reelected in 2002. Reelected in 2006. Reelected in 2010. Resigned to become a Judge of the 40th Circuit Court.	1997–2003
David Williams (Burkesville)	Republican	January 1, 1987 – November 2, 2012	Elected in 1986. Reelected in 1990. Reelected in 1994. Reelected in 1998. Reelected in 2002. Reelected in 2006. Reelected in 2010. Resigned to become a Judge of the 40th Circuit Court.	2003–2015
Sara Beth Gregory (Monticello)	Republican	December 2012 – January 1, 2015	Elected to finish Williams's term. Lost renomination.	2003–2015
Max Wise (Campbellsville)	Republican	January 1, 2015 – present	Elected in 2014. Reelected in 2018. Reelected in 2022. Reelected in 2026.	2015–2023
Max Wise (Campbellsville)	Republican	January 1, 2015 – present	Elected in 2014. Reelected in 2018. Reelected in 2022. Reelected in 2026.	2023–present
