= Senator Boswell =

Senator Boswell may refer to:

- David Boswell (Kentucky politician) (born 1949), Kentucky State Senate
- Gary Boswell (born 1954), Kentucky State Senate
- Leonard Boswell (1934–2018), Iowa State Senate
