= Gary Clemons =

Kentucky politician (born 1974)

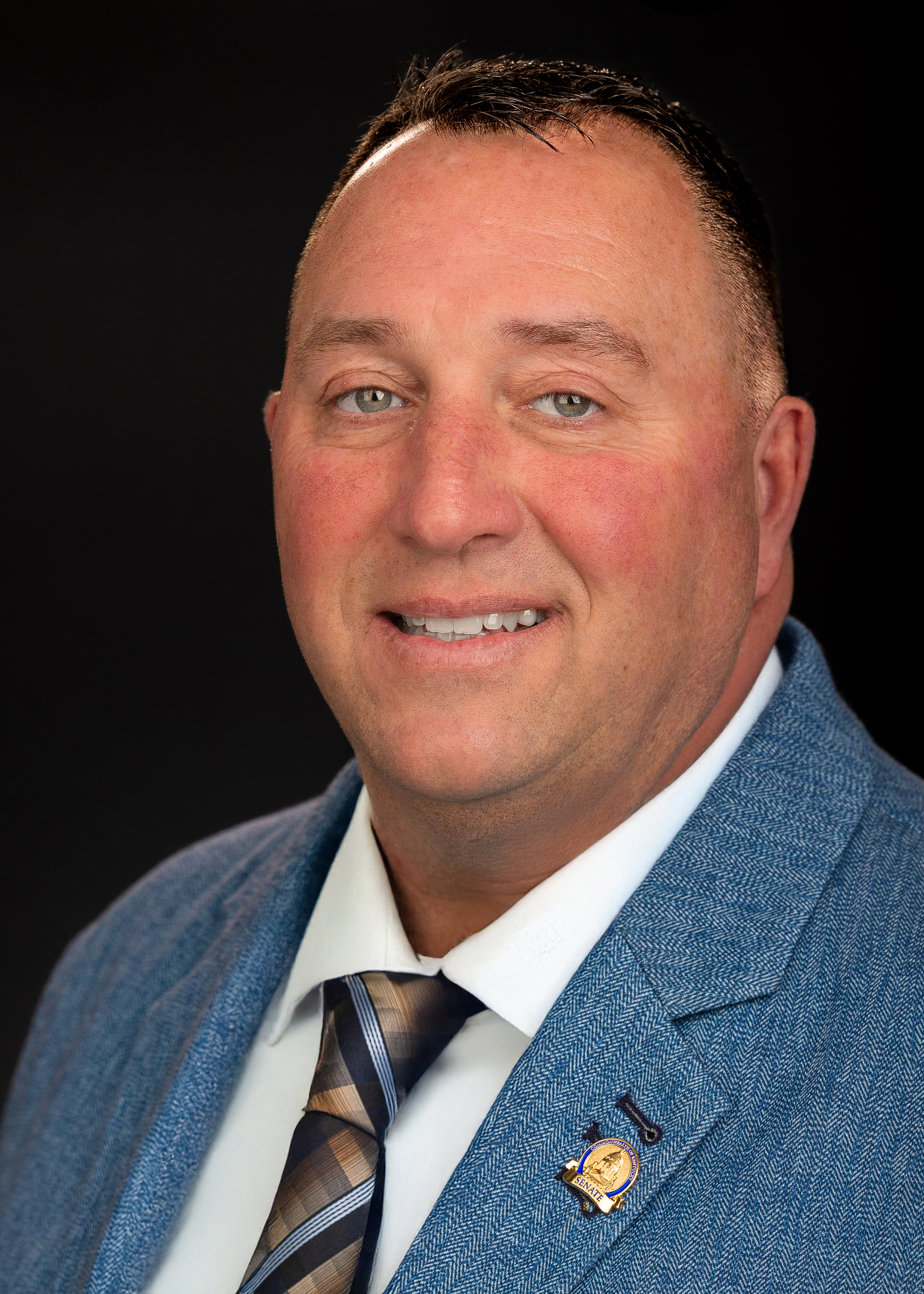
- Official portrait, 2026

Member of the Kentucky Senate from the 37th district
- Incumbent
- Assumed office January 6, 2026
- Preceded by: David Yates

Personal details
- Born: Gary Dale Clemons; August 6, 1974 (age 51) Valley Station, Kentucky
- Party: Democratic
- Website: Campaign website

Gary Dale Clemons (born August 6, 1974) is an American politician from Kentucky who is a member of the Kentucky Senate from the 37th district. Clemons was elected in a December 2025 special election following the resignation of incumbent senator David Yates, who left the position in October of that year to become Jefferson County Clerk.

== Biography ==
Clemons was born and raised in Valley Station, Kentucky. He has worked for the American Synthetic Rubber Company since 1996 and is currently president of United Steelworkers Local 1693.
