= Luke Whitehead =

American basketball player (born 1981)

- Born: February 9, 1981 (age 45); Walnut Creek, California, U.S.
- Political party: Democratic
- Basketball career

Personal information
- Listed height: 6 ft 6 in (1.98 m)
- Listed weight: 220 lb (100 kg)

Career information
- High school: Cardinal Gibbons (Fort Lauderdale, Florida); St. Ignatius (San Francisco, California); Oak Hill (Mouth of Wilson, Virginia)
- College: Louisville (2000–2004)
- NBA draft: 2004: undrafted
- Playing career: 2004–2009
- Position: Small forward

Career history
- 2004–2005: Kentucky Colonels
- 2005: Daegu Orions
- 2005: Seoul SK Knights
- 2005–2006: Alba Berlin
- 2006–2007: Sioux Falls Skyforce
- 2007–2008: Iowa Energy
- 2008–2009: Gold Coast Blaze

Career highlights
- German Basketball Cup (2006)

Luke Edward Whitehead (born February 9, 1981) is an American former professional basketball player. Born in Walnut Creek, California, he played forward for the University of Louisville.

Whitehead was a Democratic candidate for Kentucky's 36th Senate district in the 2026 election, losing the Democratic nomination.

== College ==
After graduating from Oak Hill Academy in 2000, Whitehead joined University of Louisville where he played until 2004. During his career at U of L he accumulated more than 1,000 points and over 600 rebounds. In 2003 he was named the Conference USA Tournament MVP.

=== Accident during game ===
In a game against Coppin State on December 12, 2001, Whitehead was upended while making an alley-oop when he was undercut by Larry Tucker of Coppin State and landed on the side of his head. He was taken to the hospital to determine if there was any damage to his kidneys or spine.

== Playing career ==
In 2004, he played in the NBA Summer League for the Golden State Warriors. Following the NBA Summer League, he played for the Kentucky Colonels. In 2006, he was drafted in the NBA Development League's draft by the Sioux Falls Skyforce, but was later waived due to injury.

He played for Alba Berlin during the 2005–06 Basketball Bundesliga season where he won the 2006 German Basketball Cup.

In January 2008, Whitehead was signed by the Gold Coast Blaze of the Australian National Basketball League to replace Juaquin Hawkins, who had suffered a stroke.
