= Kentucky's 36th Senate district =

American legislative district

Kentucky's 36th State Senate district
Senator
Julie Raque Adams; R–Louisville
since January 1, 2015
- Registration: 45.4% Republican; 42.1% Democratic; 11.9% No party preference
- Demographics: 79.1% White; 7.5% Black; 4.2% Hispanic; 5.4% Asian; 0.3% Other; 3.5% Multiracial
- Population (2023): 113,645
- Registered voters (2025): 107,893

Kentucky's 36th Senatorial district is one of 38 districts in the Kentucky Senate. It comprises part of Jefferson County. It has been represented by Julie Raque Adams (R–Louisville) since 2015. As of 2023, the district had a population of 113,645.

== Voter registration ==
On January 1, 2025, the district had 107,893 registered voters, who were registered with the following parties.

Party	Registration	
Party	Voters	%
Republican	48,956	45.37
Democratic	45,430	42.11
Independent	7,062	6.55
Libertarian	499	0.46
Green	79	0.07
Constitution	30	0.03
Socialist Workers	18	0.02
Reform	11	0.01
"Other"	5,808	5.38
Total	107,893	100.00
Source: Kentucky State Board of Elections

== Election results from statewide races ==
=== 2022 – present ===
Year	Office	Results (Note: Figures presented in this table are calculated by summing precinct election results published by the Kentucky State Board of Elections, using precinct data that list each precinct's senatorial district.)
2022	Senator	Paul 52.5 - 47.5%
2022	Amendment 1	No 59.0 - 41.0%
2022	Amendment 2	No 64.1 - 35.9%
2023	Governor	Beshear 58.2 - 41.8%
2023	Secretary of State	Adams 55.5 - 44.4%
2023	Attorney General	Coleman 51.2 - 48.8%
2023	Auditor of Public Accounts	Ball 54.6 - 45.4%
2023	State Treasurer	Metcalf 51.0 - 49.0%
2023	Commissioner of Agriculture	Shell 52.2 - 47.8%
2024	President	Trump 50.1 - 48.2%
2024	Amendment 1	Yes 62.1 - 37.9%
2024	Amendment 2	No 58.1 - 41.9%

== List of members representing the district ==
Member	Party	Years	Electoral history	District location
Scott Miller Jr. (Louisville)	Republican	January 1, 1958 – January 1, 1974	Elected in 1957. Reelected in 1961. Reelected in 1965. Reelected in 1969. Retired.	1944–1964; Jefferson County (part).
Scott Miller Jr. (Louisville)	Republican	January 1, 1958 – January 1, 1974	Elected in 1957. Reelected in 1961. Reelected in 1965. Reelected in 1969. Retired.	1964–1972
Scott Miller Jr. (Louisville)	Republican	January 1, 1958 – January 1, 1974	Elected in 1957. Reelected in 1961. Reelected in 1965. Reelected in 1969. Retired.	1972–1974
Eugene P. Stuart (Prospect)	Republican	January 1, 1974 – January 1, 1991	Elected in 1973. Reelected in 1977. Reelected in 1981. Reelected in 1986. Lost reelection.	1974–1984
Eugene P. Stuart (Prospect)	Republican	January 1, 1974 – January 1, 1991	Elected in 1973. Reelected in 1977. Reelected in 1981. Reelected in 1986. Lost reelection.	1984–1993; Jefferson County (part).
Susan Johns (Louisville)	Democratic	January 1, 1991 – January 1, 1995	Elected in 1990. Lost reelection.	1984–1993; Jefferson County (part).
Susan Johns (Louisville)	Democratic	January 1, 1991 – January 1, 1995	Elected in 1990. Lost reelection.	1993–1997
Julie Denton (Louisville)	Republican	January 1, 1995 – January 1, 2015	Elected in 1994. Reelected in 1998. Reelected in 2002. Reelected in 2006. Reelected in 2010. Retired.	1993–1997
Julie Denton (Louisville)	Republican	January 1, 1995 – January 1, 2015	Elected in 1994. Reelected in 1998. Reelected in 2002. Reelected in 2006. Reelected in 2010. Retired.	1997–2003
Julie Denton (Louisville)	Republican	January 1, 1995 – January 1, 2015	Elected in 1994. Reelected in 1998. Reelected in 2002. Reelected in 2006. Reelected in 2010. Retired.	2003–2015
Julie Raque Adams (Louisville)	Republican	January 1, 2015 – present	Elected in 2014. Reelected in 2018. Reelected in 2022. Lost reelection.	2015–2023
Julie Raque Adams (Louisville)	Republican	January 1, 2015 – present	Elected in 2014. Reelected in 2018. Reelected in 2022. Lost reelection.	2023–present
Sarah Cole McIntosh (Louisville)	Democratic	Assuming office January 1, 2027	Elected in 2026.	2023–present
