= Paul Marcotte =

American politician (1928–2012)

Member of the Kentucky House of Representatives from the 60th district
- In office January 1, 1995 – January 1, 2007
- Preceded by: Kenny French
- Succeeded by: Sal Santoro

Personal details
- Born: January 26, 1928 La Crosse, Wisconsin, U.S.
- Died: December 4, 2012 (aged 84) Union, Kentucky, U.S.
- Party: Republican

Paul Henry Marcotte (January 26, 1928 – December 4, 2012) was an American businessman and politician.

Born in La Crosse, Wisconsin, Marcotte graduated from Aquinas High School. Marcotte served in the United States Army. He then graduated from Saint John' University in Collegeville, Minnesota. He studied economics at the University of Vienna. Marcotte then worked in the newspaper and food industries in Wisconsin, Illinois, and Ohio. He worked for Ohio Valley AFM, Inc. He served in the Kentucky House of Representatives from Union, Kentucky from 1995 to 2007 and was a Republican. He died in Union, Kentucky.

Marcotte was first elected to the state house in 1994, defeating Democratic incumbent Kenny French. He did not seek reelection in 2006.
