= Ben Mudd =

American politician

Member-elect of the Kentucky Senate from the 14th district
- Assuming office January 1, 2027
- Succeeding: Jimmy Higdon

Personal details
- Party: Republican
- Education: University of Kentucky (PharmD)
- Occupation: Pharmacist
- Website: www.votemudd.com

Benjamin P. Mudd is an American pharmacist and politician from Kentucky. He is the Republican member-elect of the Kentucky Senate from the 14th district, succeeding Jimmy Higdon who retired at the 2026 election. Mudd supports term limits.
