= Kenny French =

American politician

Member of the Kentucky House of Representatives from the 60th district
- In office January 1, 1993 – January 1, 1995
- Preceded by: Gex Williams (redistricting)
- Succeeded by: Paul Marcotte

Personal details
- Party: Democratic

Kenny French (born 1958) is an American politician from Kentucky who was a member of the Kentucky House of Representatives from 1993 to 1995. French was elected in 1992 after incumbent representative Gex Williams was removed from the ballot due to redistricting. He was defeated for reelection in 1994 by Republican Paul Marcotte.
