= Christian Furman =

American politician

Member-elect of the Kentucky Senate from the 6th district
- Assuming office January 1, 2027
- Succeeding: Lindsey Tichenor

Personal details
- Born: Louisville, Kentucky, U.S.
- Party: Democratic

Christian Davis Furman is an American politician and physician. She is the Democratic member-elect of the Kentucky Senate from the 6th district, defeating Lindsey Tichenor. She is also a physician and medical professor at the University of Louisville and served in the Prospect City Council.

== Biography ==
=== Early life and academic career ===
Furman was born in Louisville and raised in Crestwood, graduating from Oldham County High School in 1988. She studied at the University of Louisville, where she obtained her MD in 1996 and a MSPH in 2003, and was an internal medicine resident from 1996 to 1996 and a geriatric medicine fellow from 1999 to 2000.

Furman is a physician specializing in geriatric and palliative care at UofL, where she is holds positions of chief of palliative medicine and medical director (both at the UofL Trager Institute). As an academic, she is Professor of Geriatric and Palliative Medicine and Margaret Dorward Smock Endowed Chair in Geriatric Medicine at the School of Medicine. She is a Fellow of the American Geriatrics Society.

=== Political career ===
In 2024, Furman was elected to Prospect City Council, receiving the second-highest votes of all eight candidates.

Furman ran in Kentucky's 6th Senate district in the 2026 election as a Democratic candidate, challenging Republican incumbent Lindsey Tichenor. Furman cited environmental protection, public education funding, and universal preschool as planned legislative priorities, and her campaign prioritized affordability and public safety. She received an endorsement from governor Andy Beshear. She won the Democratic primary in May 2026, defeating local Ford factory worker Chaz Stoess 76.5% to 23.5%. She defeated Tichenor in the general election 51.2% to 48.8%.
