= David Yates (politician) =

American politician (born 1980)

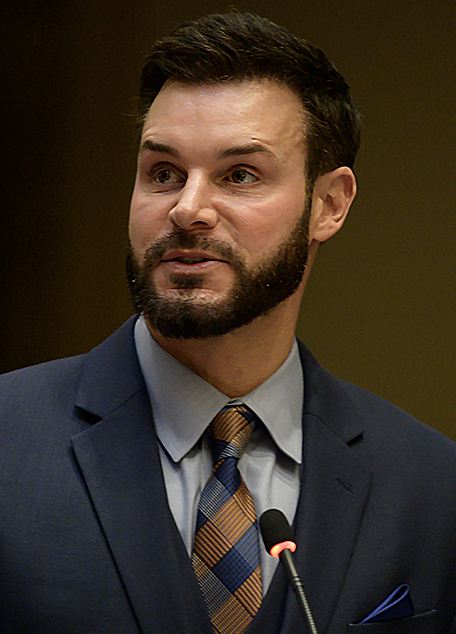
- Yates in 2024

County Clerk of Jefferson County
- Incumbent
- Assumed office October 8, 2025
- Preceded by: Bobbie Holsclaw

Minority Whip of the Kentucky Senate
- In office January 3, 2023 – October 8, 2025
- Preceded by: Dennis Parrett
- Succeeded by: Cassie Chambers Armstrong

Member of the Kentucky Senate from the 37th district
- In office January 1, 2021 – October 8, 2025
- Preceded by: Perry B. Clark
- Succeeded by: Gary Clemons

President of the Louisville Metro Council
- In office January 7, 2016 – January 11, 2018
- Preceded by: David W. Tandy
- Succeeded by: David James

Member of the Louisville Metro Council from the 25th district
- In office January 2011 – January 1, 2021
- Preceded by: Doug Hawkins
- Succeeded by: Amy Holton Stewart

Personal details
- Born: June 3, 1980 (age 46) Louisville, Kentucky, U.S.
- Party: Democratic
- Relations: Jim Yates (grandfather)
- Children: 2
- Education: University of Louisville (BA); Northern Kentucky University (JD)

Charles David Yates (born June 3, 1980) is an American attorney and politician serving as the county clerk of Jefferson County, Kentucky. A member of the Democratic Party, Yates previously served as a member of the Kentucky Senate from January 2021 to October 2025, and the Louisville Metro Council from 2011 to 2021. Yates also served as president of the Louisville Metro Council from 2016 to 2018, and as Senate minority whip from 2023 to 2025.

== Early life and education ==
Yates was raised in Louisville, Kentucky. His grandfather, Jim Yates, served as a member of the Kentucky House of Representatives from Kentucky's 44th House district from 1972 to 1994. His great-uncle, Charlie Yates, was a prominent Louisville police officer who assisted in founding the city's Fraternal Order of Police chapter.

Yates graduated from Holy Cross High School, before going on to earn a Bachelor of Arts degree in political science from the University of Louisville in 2003, and a Juris Doctor degree from the Salmon P. Chase College of Law at Northern Kentucky University in 2006.

Following law school, he clerked for judge William Bertelsman of the United States District Court for the Eastern District of Kentucky, and afterwards was employed by the commonwealth attorney's office. From 2006 to 2008, Yates served as an assistant attorney general. He has since worked as a personal injury attorney.

== Political career ==
=== Louisville Metro Council ===
In November 2010, Yates defeated Republican incumbent Doug Hawkins for the Louisville Metro Council's 25th district, becoming the youngest member ever elected to the council as well as the first to ever unseat an elected member.

In late 2015, Yates announced his intent to challenge David W. Tandy for the council's presidency. Tandy was initially elected to the position following the death of president Jim King earlier that year, but his tenure was marked by splits within the council's Democratic caucus, with Yates being his chief critic. This conflict came to a head when the caucus failed to initially endorse a candidate during a meeting in December, with neither Tandy or Yates getting a majority of the votes necessary. However, Tandy withdrew from the race the week of the election. Yates was subsequently elected council president along party lines against Republican Kelly Downard, setting another record as the youngest member ever elected council president.

As president, Yates gained attention for his personal legal work against the Louisville Metro Police Department. In March 2017, he filed a lawsuit containing allegations of sexual abuse against officers involved in the department's youth explorers program. While Yates attempted to emphasize his intent to keep separate his roles as council president and as an attorney for the alleged victims, he was disqualified from the case due to a conflict of interest. During this time, Yates was charged with felony assault after he punched a man in the face after he allegedly harassed and threatened himself and his girlfriend while they were attending a University of Louisville football game. Yates stated that his actions were in self-defense, and were appropriate to defend themselves. Yates also said that the timing of the charge was not surprising given his suit against the LMPD. Ultimately however, a grand jury declined to indict him.

=== Kentucky Senate ===
In 2020, Yates chose to run for Kentucky's 37th Senate district after incumbent Perry B. Clark chose not to seek reelection. Yates won the four-way Democratic primary with 10,946 votes (67%) and was unopposed in the 2020 Kentucky Senate election. He assumed office on January 1, 2021.

During his tenure, Yates was elected by the Senate Democratic caucus as minority whip following the retirement of senator Dennis Parrett, serving in the position until his appointment as interim county clerk of Jefferson County in October 2025.

==== Legislation ====
During his Senate tenure, Yates was the primary sponsor of the following bills which were considered by at least one chamber:

| Bill | Title | House Vote | Senate Vote | Governor | Ky. Acts |
|---|---|---|---|---|---|
| 22 SB 23 | An act relating to theft of mail matter | Passed 81–14 | Passed 37–0 | Signed | 2022 c. 97 |
| 23 SB 229 | An act relating to child abuse | Passed 91–6 | Passed 36–0 | Signed | 2023 c. 107 |
| 23 SB 268 | An act relating to financial support of a child or dependent after driving under the influence | Passed 84–12 | Passed 37–0 | Signed | 2023 c. 174 |
| 24 SB 45 | An act relating to Kentucky Alert Systems | Passed 92–0 | Passed 32–1 | Signed | 2024 c. 52 |
| 24 SB 48 | An act relating to employment | Not voted | Passed 37–0 | —N/a | —N/a |
| 25 SB 133 | An act relating to sanctioning bodies for boxing and wrestling exhibitions | Passed 89–0 | Passed 37–0 | Signed | 2025 c. 69 |

=== Jefferson County Clerk ===
With the support of congressman Morgan McGarvey and former congressman John Yarmuth, Yates announced in June 2025 his intention to run for county clerk of Jefferson County. The office had been held by Republican incumbent Bobbie Holsclaw since 1999. However, before announcing whether not she intended to seek reelection, Holsclaw died on September 10, 2025. Louisville mayor Craig Greenberg appointed Yates as interim clerk in October to complete Holsclaw's term, and he subsequently won the Democratic primary with 65,476 votes (69%). Yates is unopposed in the 2026 general election.

== Personal life ==
Yates lives in South Louisville with his wife, Lindsey. The couple have two daughters together.
