= Max Wise =

American educator and Republican politician

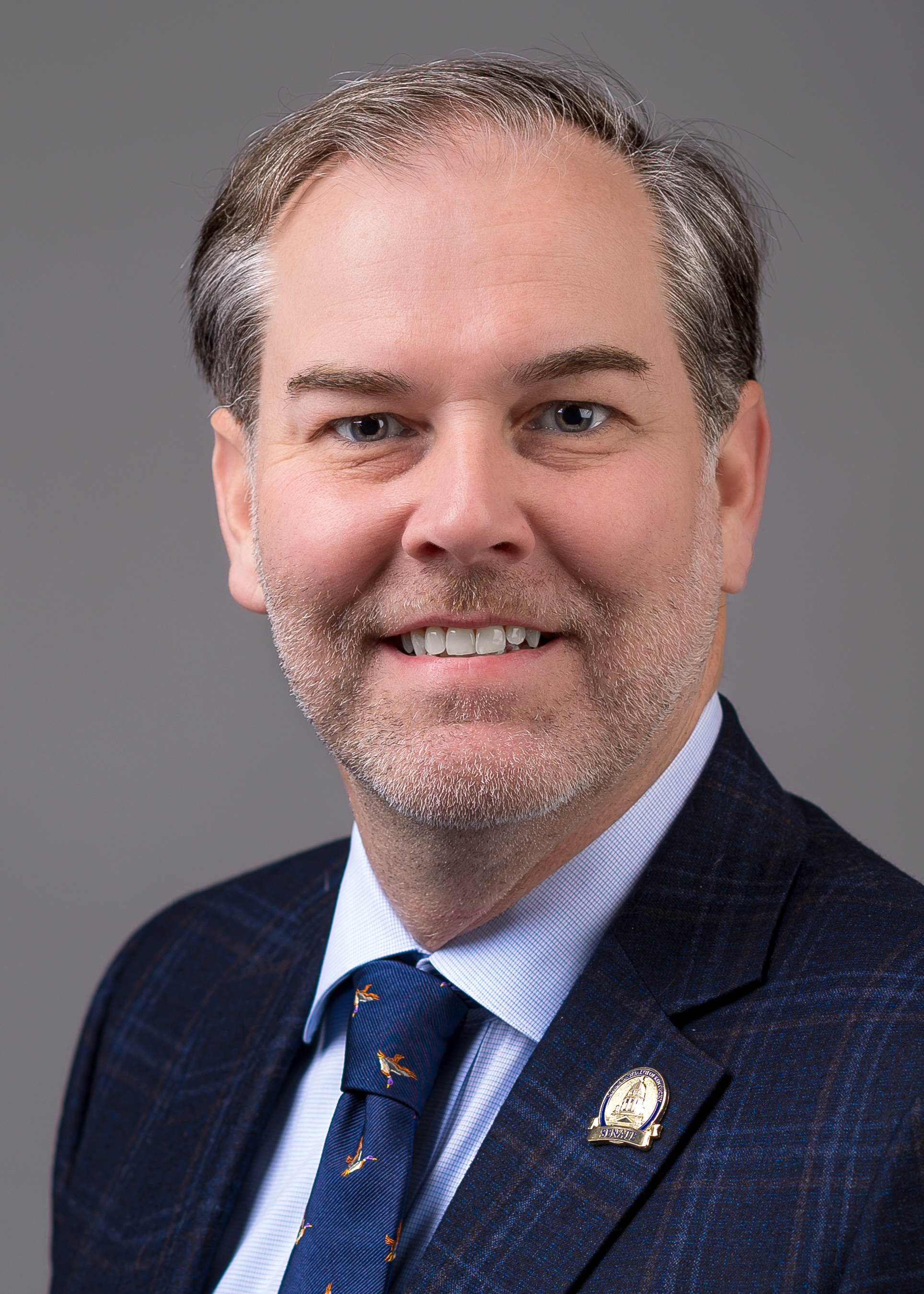
- Official Portrait, 2024

Majority Leader of the Kentucky Senate
- Incumbent
- Assumed office January 7, 2025
- Whip: Mike Wilson
- Preceded by: Damon Thayer

Member of the Kentucky Senate from the 16th district
- Incumbent
- Assumed office January 1, 2015
- Preceded by: Sara Beth Gregory

Personal details
- Born: George Maxwell Wise; June 28, 1975 (age 51) Campbellsville, Kentucky, U.S.
- Party: Republican
- Spouse: Heather Hood
- Children: 4
- Education: Campbellsville University (BA); University of Kentucky (MA); Texas A&M University (GrCert)

George Maxwell Wise (born June 28, 1975) is an American politician and former FBI agent, who has served as a member of the Kentucky Senate since January 2015. A member of the Republican Party, Wise represents Kentucky's 16th Senate district, which includes Adair, Allen, Metcalfe, Monroe, and Taylor counties as well as part of Warren County. He has served as Senate majority leader since January 2025.

During the 2023 Kentucky gubernatorial election, former U.S. Ambassador to the United Nations Kelly Craft chose Wise to be her running mate. Their ticket was defeated by Kentucky attorney general Daniel Cameron.

== Early life and education ==
Wise was born in Campbellsville, Kentucky. He attended Campbellsville High School, graduating in 1993.

He earned a Bachelor of Arts degree in political science and history from Campbellsville University in 1997. He then earned a Master of Arts degree in international politics and national security from the University of Kentucky in 1999, and a graduate certificate in homeland security from Texas A&M University.

== Career ==
=== FBI and academia ===
Prior to entering politics, when 9/11 took place Wise joined the Federal Bureau of Investigation, and served as an agent in the FBI Counterterrorism Division. He was first assigned to FBI headquarters in Washington, D.C. before being relocated to the Louisville, Kentucky field office. He was a member of the Louisville Joint Terrorism Task Force and the Kentucky Intelligence Fusion Center. Wise then taught political science at Campbellsville University, and graduate-level terrorism courses at the University of Kentucky.

=== Kentucky Senate ===
Wise was first elected to the Kentucky Senate in November 2014, defeating Republican incumbent Sara Beth Gregory of Kentucky's 16th Senate district in the Republican primary 54%-46%. Wise was then unchallenged in the 2014 Kentucky Senate general election, and assumed office on January 1, 2015. Wise was unopposed for reelection in 2018 and 2022.

==== Senate tenure ====
During the 2017 legislative session, Wise served as chair of the Senate Enrollment Committee and vice chair of the Senate Education Committee. From 2019 to 2022, he has served as the Senate Education Committee chair. From 2023 to 2024, he also served as chair of the Senate Economic Development, Tourism, and Labor committee.

Following the retirement of longtime Senate majority leader Damon Thayer in 2025, Wise was elected to the position by the Republican caucus, defeating Senate majority caucus chair Julie Raque Adams.

=== 2023 gubernatorial election ===
In September 2022, former U.S. Ambassador to the United Nations Kelly Craft chose Wise to be her running mate in the 2023 Kentucky gubernatorial election. Their ticket placed third in the Republican primary, losing to Kentucky attorney general Daniel Cameron.

== Personal life ==
Wise's father is George Wise, and his mother Donna Wise was the women's basketball coach at Campbellsville University. She is Campbellsville University's all-time winningest coach, and was inducted into the NAIA Basketball Hall of Fame in 2000, and the Kentucky Athletic Hall of Fame in 2010.

Wise is married to Heather Hood Wise. She had been a high school basketball star at Glasgow High School and started her college career at Georgetown College, and Wise met her when he helped his mother recruit her to play for CU. She is now a pediatric dentist. They have four children; Grayson, Jackson, Carter, and McLean.

Kentucky Senate
Preceded by Damon Thayer	Majority Leader of the Kentucky Senate; 2025–present	Incumbent
