= Lindsey Tichenor =

American politician (born 1977)

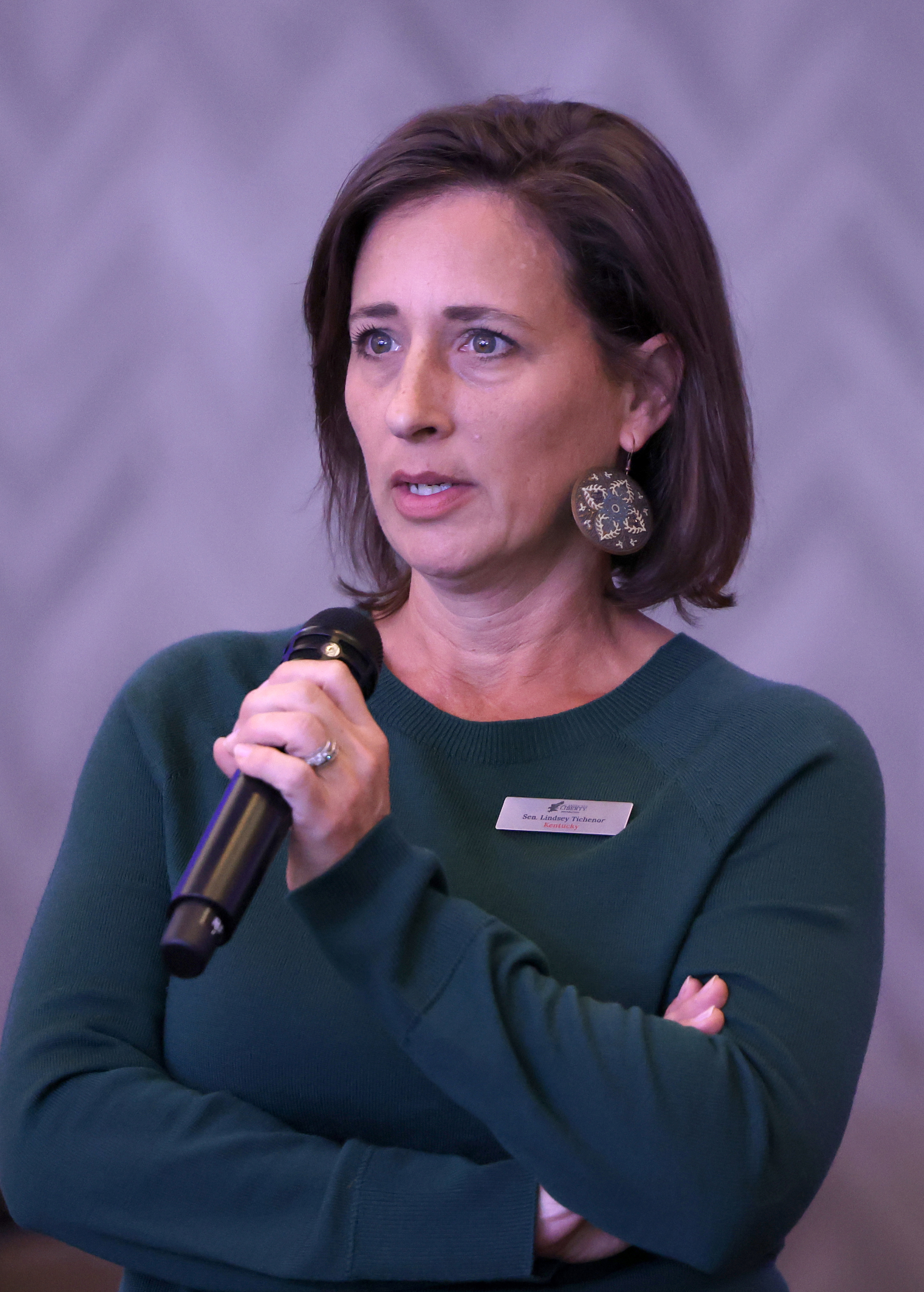
- Tichenor at the 2024 Hazlitt Summit hosted by Young Americans for Liberty Foundation

Member of the Kentucky Senate from the 6th district
- Incumbent
- Assumed office January 1, 2023
- Preceded by: C.B. Embry Jr. (redistricting)

Personal details
- Born: January 29, 1977 (age 49) Louisville, Kentucky, U.S.
- Party: Republican
- Spouse: Bowin Tichenor
- Children: 4
- Website: http://tichenorforkentucky.com/

Lindsey E. Tichenor (born January 29, 1977) is an American politician and real estate agent from Kentucky. A member of the Republican Party, she has represented the 6th district in the Kentucky Senate since 2023. Tichenor was defeated for reelection in 2026, losing to Democratic candidate Christian Furman.

== Biography ==
Tichenor was born in Louisville, Kentucky. She has worked as a real estate agent with Covenant Realty, LLC, and worked at Arbonne International. She has participated in outreach programs with Water Step (formerly Edge Outreach) and has served in various roles within the Oldham County Republican Party, including as education and district chair. She is also a member of the Oldham County Republican Women's Club.

== Political career ==
=== Elections ===
In 2022, Tichenor won the Republican nomination for Kentucky's 6th Senate District, defeating Bill Ferko with 54% of the vote. She subsequently won the general election against Democratic write-in candidate Brian Easley, receiving 94.5% of the vote.

Tichenor announced her intention to run for re-election in 2026.

Tichenor was defeated for reelection in 2026, losing to Democratic candidate Christian Furman.

=== Sponsored legislation ===
During her tenure, Tichenor has sponsored legislation on topics including religious liberty (SB60), antisemitism awareness in higher education (SJR55), tax exemptions for senior homeowners (SB67), opioid treatment research (SB240), and missing children alert system reform (SB289).
