= Julie Raque Adams =

American politician (born 1969)

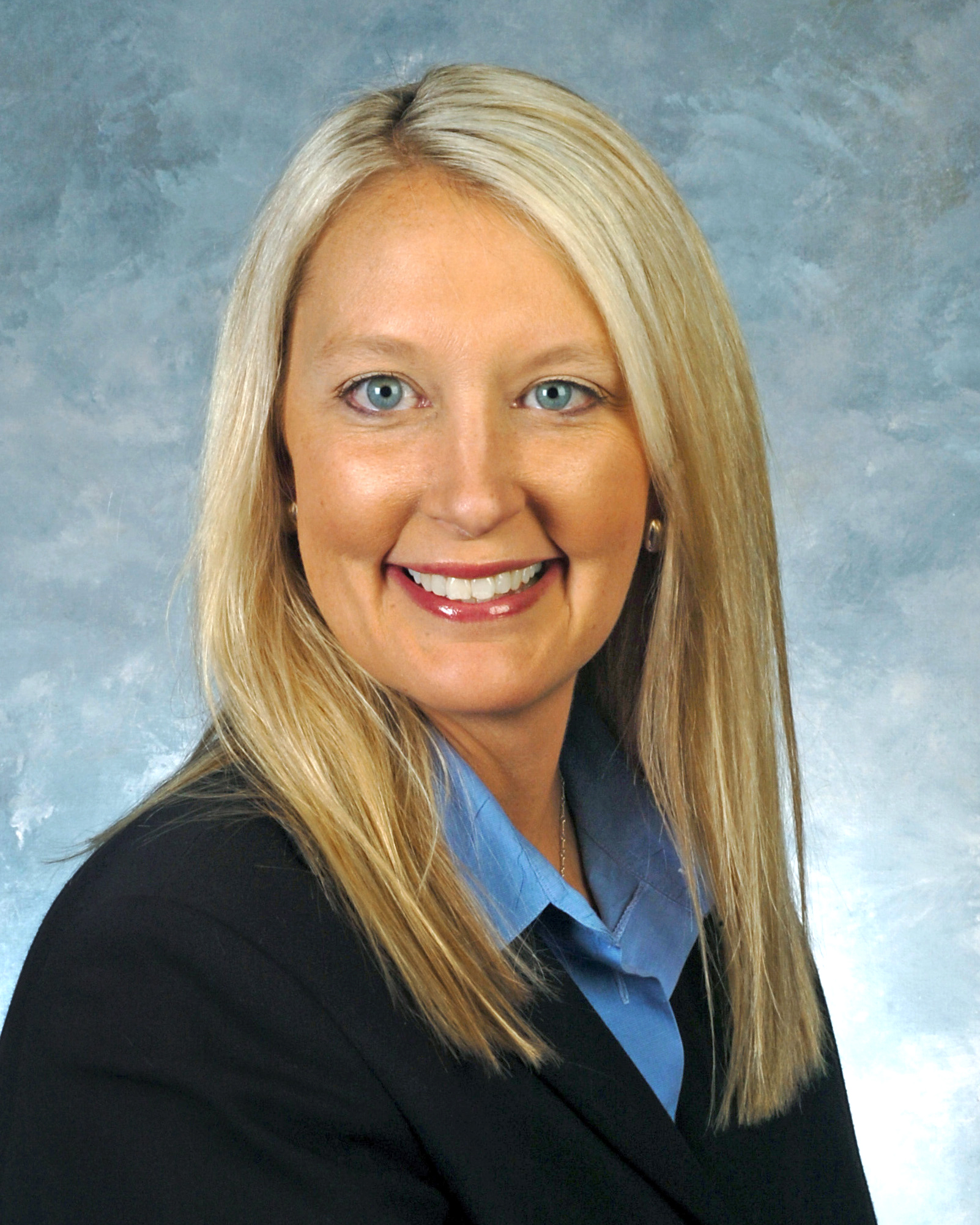
- Official portrait, 2010

Member of the Kentucky Senate from the 36th district
- Incumbent
- Assumed office January 1, 2015
- Preceded by: Julie Denton

Member of the Kentucky House of Representatives from the 32nd district
- In office January 1, 2011 – January 1, 2015
- Preceded by: Scott Brinkman
- Succeeded by: Phil Moffett

Member of the Louisville Metro Council from the 18th district
- In office January 1, 2003 – January 1, 2009
- Preceded by: Constituency established
- Succeeded by: Jon Ackerson

Personal details
- Born: June 11, 1969 (age 57) Louisville, Kentucky, U.S.
- Party: Republican
- Children: 2
- Education: Saint Mary's College (BA); George Washington University (MA)

Julie Marie Raque Adams (born June 11, 1969) is an American businesswoman, politician and a Republican member of the Kentucky Senate representing District 36 since January 1, 2015. She is a former member of the Kentucky House of Representatives and the Louisville Metro Council. Raque Adams was defeated for reelection in 2026, losing to Democratic candidate Sarah Cole McIntosh.

== Education ==
Raque Adams attended Sacred Heart Academy. Raque Adams earned her BA degree from Saint Mary's College in Notre Dame, Indiana, and her MA from George Washington University.

== Personal life ==
Raque Adams was born in Louisville, Kentucky. She is married to Jim Adams, and is the mother of two sons, James and Joseph.

== Louisville Metro Council ==
=== Elections ===
==== 2002 ====
Raque Adams began her political career by running for the District 18 Seat on the Louisville Metro Council in 2002. According to a 2015 interview, Raque Adams stated that she had chosen to enter politics because, according to her, she wanted a stop sign on her street to protect the school children who crossed the road, but no one listened to her request. She ran unopposed in the 2002 Republican Primary. Raque Adams faced off against Democratic candidate James Baker Sr., as well as Libertarian candidate Sam Cox. The General Election was held on November 5, 2002. Raque Adams won with an overwhelming 70.6% of the vote, or 7,450 of the 11,166 votes cast.

Louisville Metro Council District 18 Election, 2002
Party	Candidate	Votes	%	±%
Republican	Julie Raque Adams	7,450	70.6%	0.0%
Democratic	James Baker Sr.	2,905	27.53%	−43.07%
Libertarian	Sam Cox	198	1.88%	−68.72%
Majority				
Turnout		10,553	72.81%	
Republican hold		Swing		

Raque Adams was sworn in for her first term as a Councilwoman on January 1, 2003.

==== 2006 ====
Raque Adams ran for reelection in 2006. Once again, she was unopposed in the Republican primary. In the general election, she faced no Democratic opponent, instead facing off against Libertarian Donna Walker Mancini, the head of the Libertarian Party in Kentucky. The General Election was held on November 2, 2006. Raque Adams easily won a second term, with 83% of the vote.

Louisville Metro Council District 18 Election, 2006
Party	Candidate	Votes	%	±%
Republican	Julie Raque Adams	11,166	83.74%	0.0%
Libertarian	Donna Walker Mancini	2,168	16.26%	−67.48%
Majority		8,998	67.48%	
Turnout		11,166	83.74%	
Republican hold		Swing		

Raque Adams was sworn in for the second time on January 1, 2005.

=== Tenure ===
==== EPA Advisory Council ====
On June 17, 2004, Raque Adams was named by Environmental Protection Agency Administrator Mike Leavitt to the U.S. Environmental Protection Agency's Local Government Advisory Committee. The committee is made up of thirty-one local government officials from across the country who work to advise the EPA on how environmental policy will affect local governments. Raque Adams served on the committee until her retirement from the Metro Council in 2009.

==== Smoking ban ====
In 2006, Raque Adams successfully sponsored legislation to ban smoking in public places within the boundary of the Louisville Metro Area.

== Kentucky House of Representatives ==
=== Elections ===
==== 2010 ====
In 2010, Raque Adams chose to run for the House seat vacated by retired District 32 Representative Scott Brinkman. The Republican Primary was held on May 18, 2010, and was a race between Raque Adams and fellow Republican Jimmy Yancy. Raque Adams won with 57.76% of the vote.

Kentucky House of Representatives District 32 Republican Primary, 2010
Party	Candidate	Votes	%	±%
Republican	Julie Raque Adams	2,654	57.76%	0.0%
Republican	Jimmy Yancy	1,941	42.24%	−15.52%
Majority				
Turnout		4,595		
Republican hold		Swing		

In the general election held on November 2, 2010, Raque Adams faced off against Democratic nominee Nellie Stallings and Libertarian candidate Matthew Linker. Raque Adams easily won the election with 62.9% of the vote.

Kentucky House of Representatives District 32 Election, 2010
Party	Candidate	Votes	%	±%
Republican	Julie Raque Adams	11,449	62.92%	0.0%
Democratic	Nellie Draus Stallings	6,256	34.38%	−28.54%
Libertarian	Matthew Linker	492	2.70%	−60.21%
Majority		11,449	62.92%	
Turnout		18,197		
Republican hold		Swing		

Adams was sworn into her first term as a Representative on January 1, 2011.

==== 2012 ====
In the 2012 Republican primary for District 32 heald on May 22, 2012, Raque Adams ran unopposed. The General Election, held on November 6, 2012, saw Raque Adams running unopposed, and saw her winning all 16,038 votes cast. Not a single vote was cast for any write-in candidate.

Kentucky House of Representatives District 32 Election, 2012
Party	Candidate	Votes	%	±%
Republican	Julie Raque Adams	16,038	100.0%	0.0%
Majority		16,038	100.0%	0.0%
Turnout		16,038		
Republican hold		Swing		

=== Tenure ===
A map of District 32 in the Kentucky House of Representatives

==== Statewide smoking ban ====
In 2014, Raque Adams co-sponsored House Bill 173 (HB173), which would have banned smoking in public places, as well as in indoor workplaces. Raque Adams sponsored the bill with Democratic Representative Susan Westrom of Lexington. In response to the bill passing the House Committee on Health and Wellness, Raque Adams stated: "We cannot continue to allow smoking in the workplace. It hurts productivity, increases health care costs and makes us less attractive to new businesses.

== Kentucky Senate ==
=== Elections ===
==== 2014 ====
Instead of running for a third term in the Kentucky House of Representatives, Raque Adams chose to run for the 36th District in the Kentucky Senate. She ran unopposed in the primary. The General Election was held on November 4, 2014. Raque Adams faced off against Democratic candidate Siddique Malik. She won the election with 66% of the vote.

Kentucky Senate District 36 Election, 2014
Party	Candidate	Votes	%	±%
Republican	Julie Raque Adams	31,623	66.39%	0.0%
Democratic	Siddique Malik	16,011	33.61%	−32.77%
Majority		31,623	66.39%	
Turnout		47,634		
Republican hold		Swing		

Raque Adams was sworn in as a State Senator on January 1, 2015.

== 2016 presidential election ==
=== Presidential endorsement ===
On March 5, 2016, Raque Adams announced her endorsement of Presidential candidate Marco Rubio. Rubio would eventually lose the nomination to Donald Trump who would eventually win the presidency.

=== Republican National Convention ===
At the 2016 Republican National Convention, Raque Adams was one of Kentucky's 46 delegates to the convention.
