= Danny Carroll (Kentucky politician) =

American politician (born 1963)

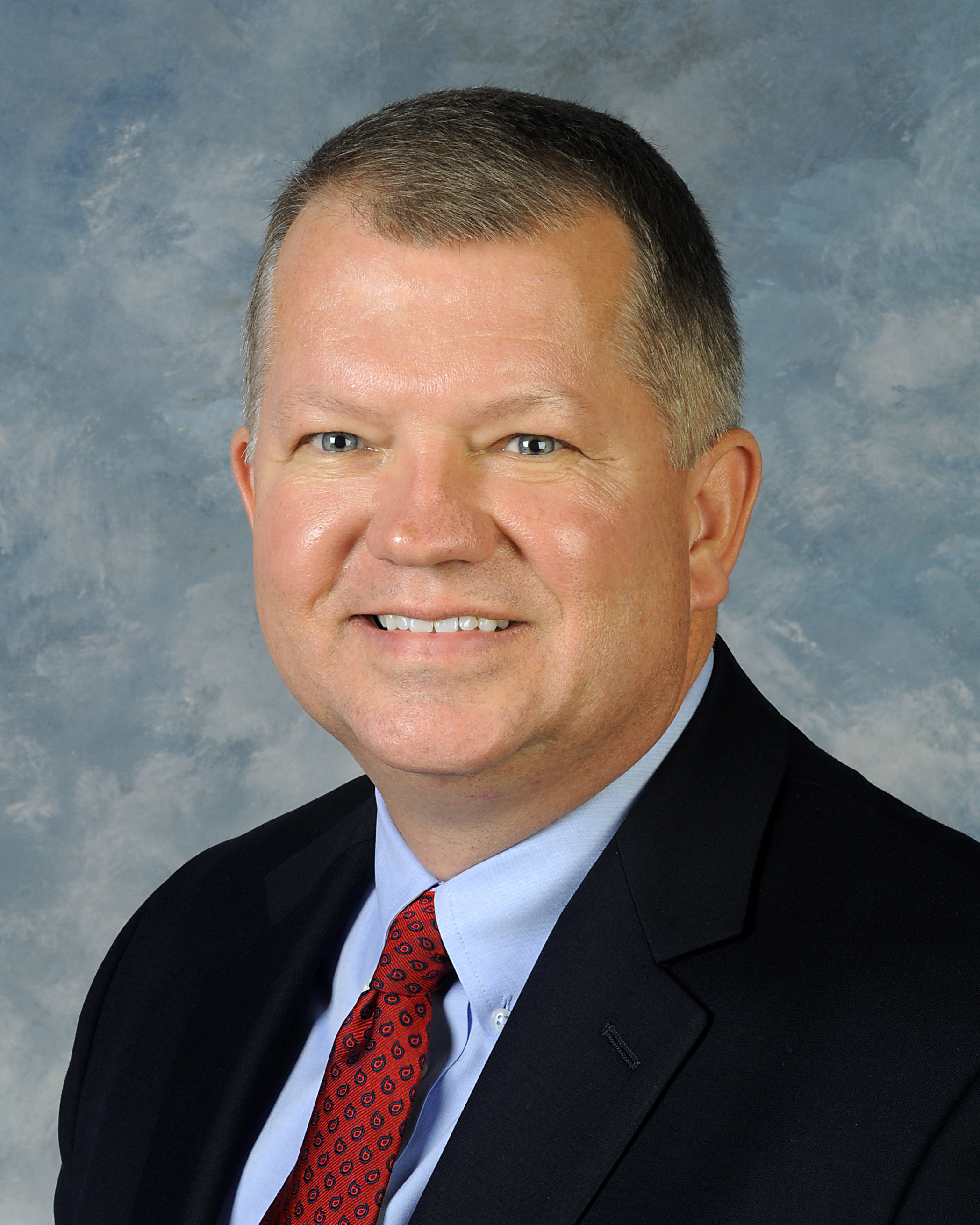
- Official portrait, 2014

Member of the Kentucky Senate from the 2nd district
- Incumbent
- Assumed office January 1, 2015
- Preceded by: Bob Leeper

Personal details
- Born: November 4, 1963 (age 62) Paducah, Kentucky, U.S.
- Party: Republican

Daniel Wayne Carroll (born November 4, 1963) is an American politician who has served in the Kentucky Senate from the 2nd district since 2015.

In early 2019, Carroll withdrew a bill (which he later claimed he did not write) that would put strict limits on access to public records.

In 2021, Carroll proposed a bill which would make it a crime to insult or taunt a police officer.
