= Gex Williams =

American politician (born 1952)

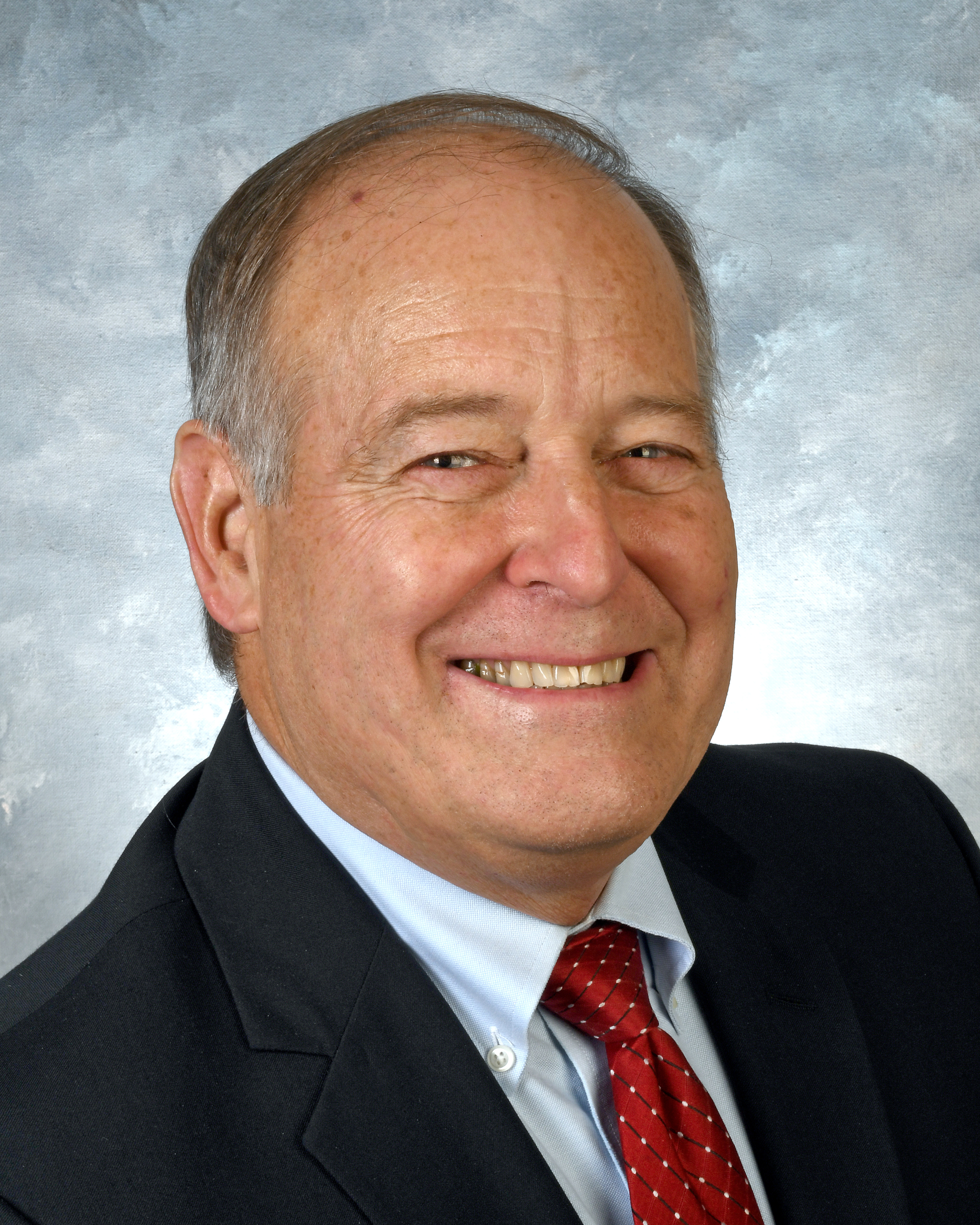
- Official portrait, 2022

Member of the Kentucky Senate
- Incumbent
- Assumed office January 1, 2023
- Preceded by: Paul Hornback
- Constituency: 20th district
- In office March 3, 1993 – January 1, 1999
- Preceded by: Dick Roeding (redistricting)
- Succeeded by: Katie Kratz Stine
- Constituency: 24th district

Member of the Kentucky House of Representatives from the 60th district
- In office January 1, 1991 – January 1, 1993
- Preceded by: William McBee
- Succeeded by: Kenny French (redistricting)

Personal details
- Born: August 22, 1952 (age 74)
- Party: Republican
- Education: University of Florida

Edwin Gex Williams (pronounced /ˈdʒeɪ/ JAY; born August 22, 1952) is an American politician from Kentucky. He is a member of the Republican Party and has represented District 20 in the Kentucky Senate since January 1, 2023. Williams's experience includes working as an internet and IT consultant. He resides in Verona, Kentucky. From 1991 to 1992 Williams represented Kentucky House District 60. In 1993, he served in the Kentucky Senate, representing District 24 until 1998. He ran for Kentucky's 4th congressional district in the 1998 elections, but lost the general election to Ken Lucas.
