= Donald Douglas (politician) =

American politician

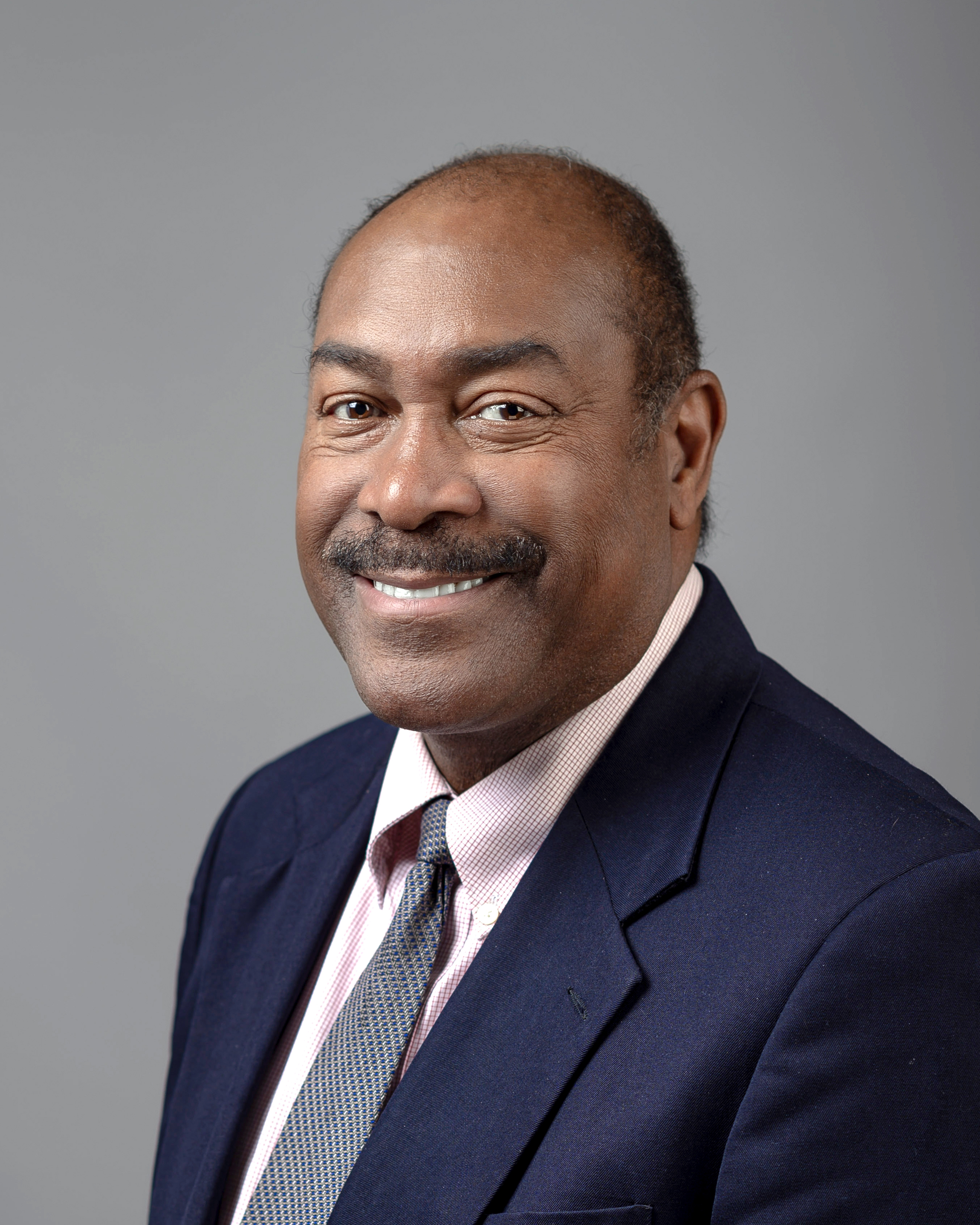
- Official portrait, 2024

Member of the Kentucky Senate from the 22nd district
- Incumbent
- Assumed office November 18, 2021
- Preceded by: Tom Buford

Personal details
- Born: March 6, 1957 (age 69)
- Party: Republican
- Education: Western Kentucky University (BS); University of Kentucky (MD)

Donald Ray Douglas (born March 6, 1957) is an American physician and politician serving as a member of the Kentucky Senate from the 22nd district. He assumed office on November 18, 2021.

== Early life and education ==
Douglas was raised in Owensboro, Kentucky in a family of 16 children. After graduating from Daviess County High School, Douglas earned a Bachelor of Science degree in biology from Western Kentucky University and a Doctor of Medicine from the University of Kentucky College of Medicine. He completed medical internships at the University of Kentucky and Saint Elizabeth Hospital in Utica, New York.

== Career ==
Outside of politics, Douglas works as medical director and lead physician at the Tony Delk IMAC Regeneration Center in Lexington, Kentucky. He was elected to the Kentucky Senate in a November 2021 special election. When he assumed office, he became the first African-American Republican state senator in Kentucky.

== Personal life ==
A former track and field athlete, Douglas participated in the 1980 and 1984 United States Olympic trials. During the 1980s, Douglas was one of the world's top athletes in the 400 meter hurdle event.
