= Matthew Deneen =

American politician (born 1968)

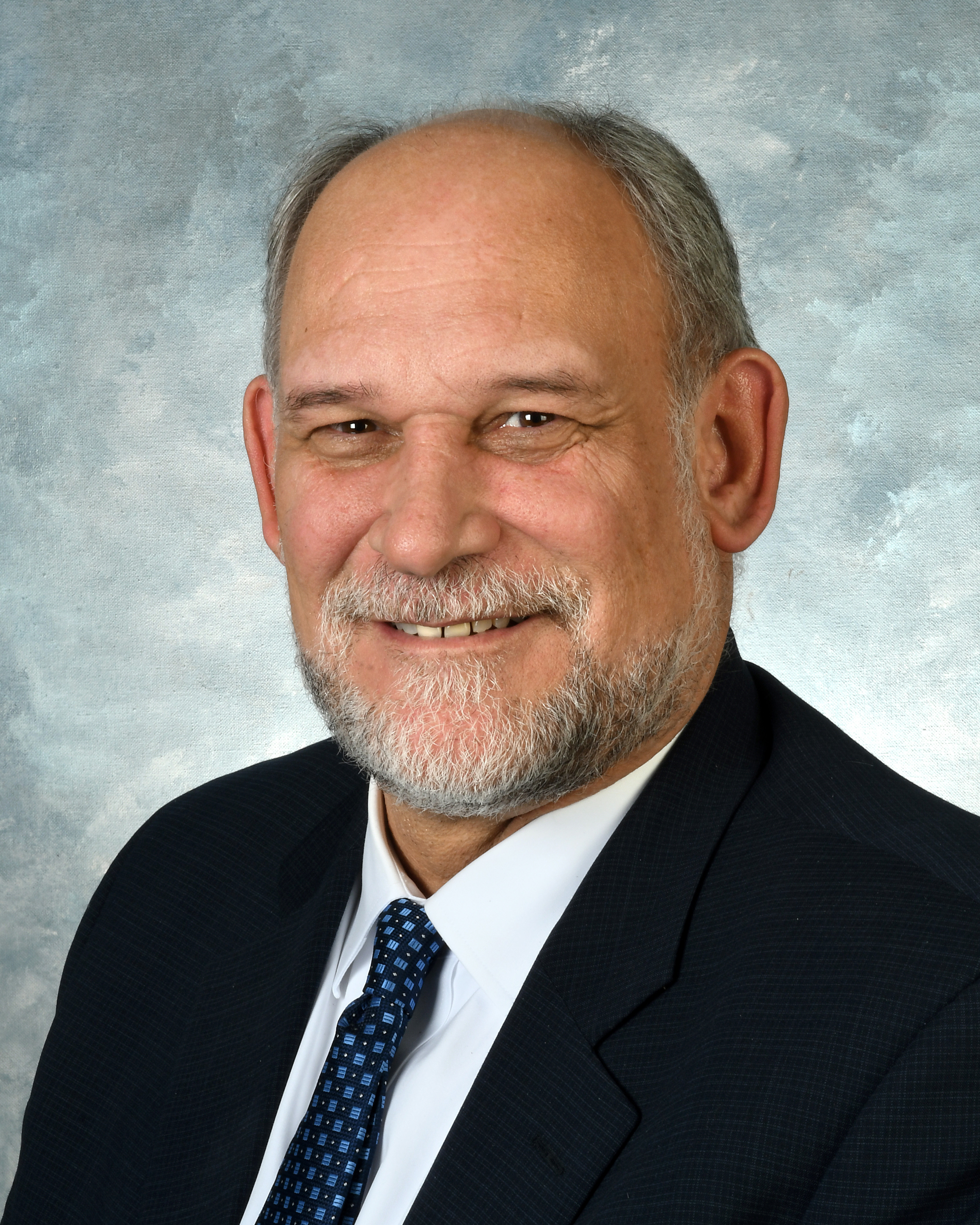
- Official portrait, 2022

Member of the Kentucky Senate from the 10th district
- Incumbent
- Assumed office January 1, 2023
- Preceded by: Dennis Parrett

Personal details
- Born: September 19, 1968 (age 57)
- Party: Republican

Matthew Darin Deneen (born September 19, 1968) is an American politician from Kentucky. He is a member of the Republican Party and has represented District 10 in the Kentucky Senate since January 1, 2023. Deneen resides in Elizabethtown, Kentucky.
