= Shelley Funke Frommeyer =

American politician (born 1969)

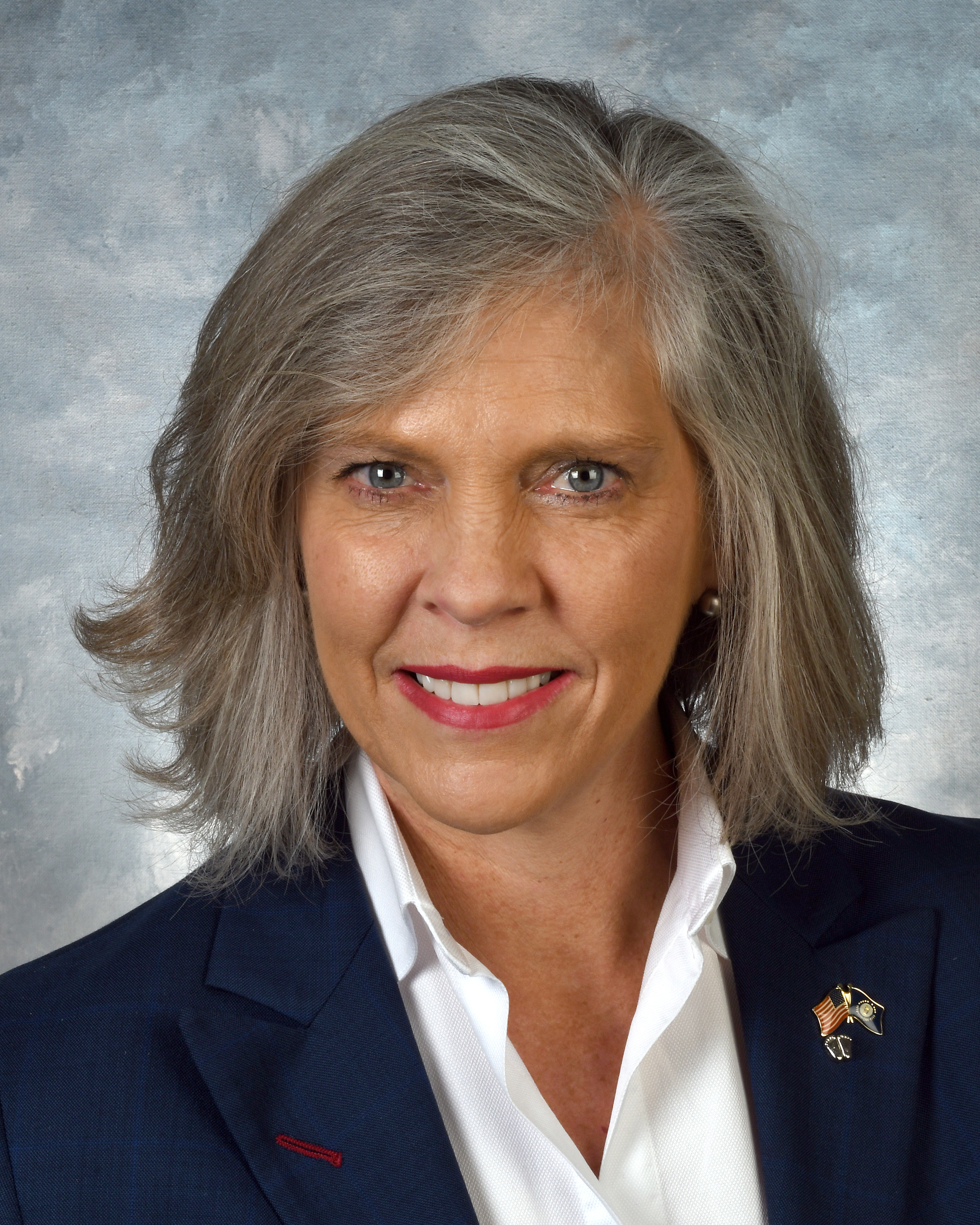
- Official portrait, 2022

Member of the Kentucky Senate from the 24th district
- Incumbent
- Assumed office January 1, 2023
- Preceded by: Wil Schroder

Personal details
- Born: June 21, 1969 (age 57)
- Party: Republican

Michelle Ann "Shelley" Frommeyer (born June 21, 1969) is an American politician from Kentucky. She is a member of the Republican Party and has represented District 24 in the Kentucky Senate since January 1, 2023. Funke Frommeyer is a certified financial planner, and she resides in Alexandria, Kentucky.
