= Amanda Mays Bledsoe =

American politician (born 1978)

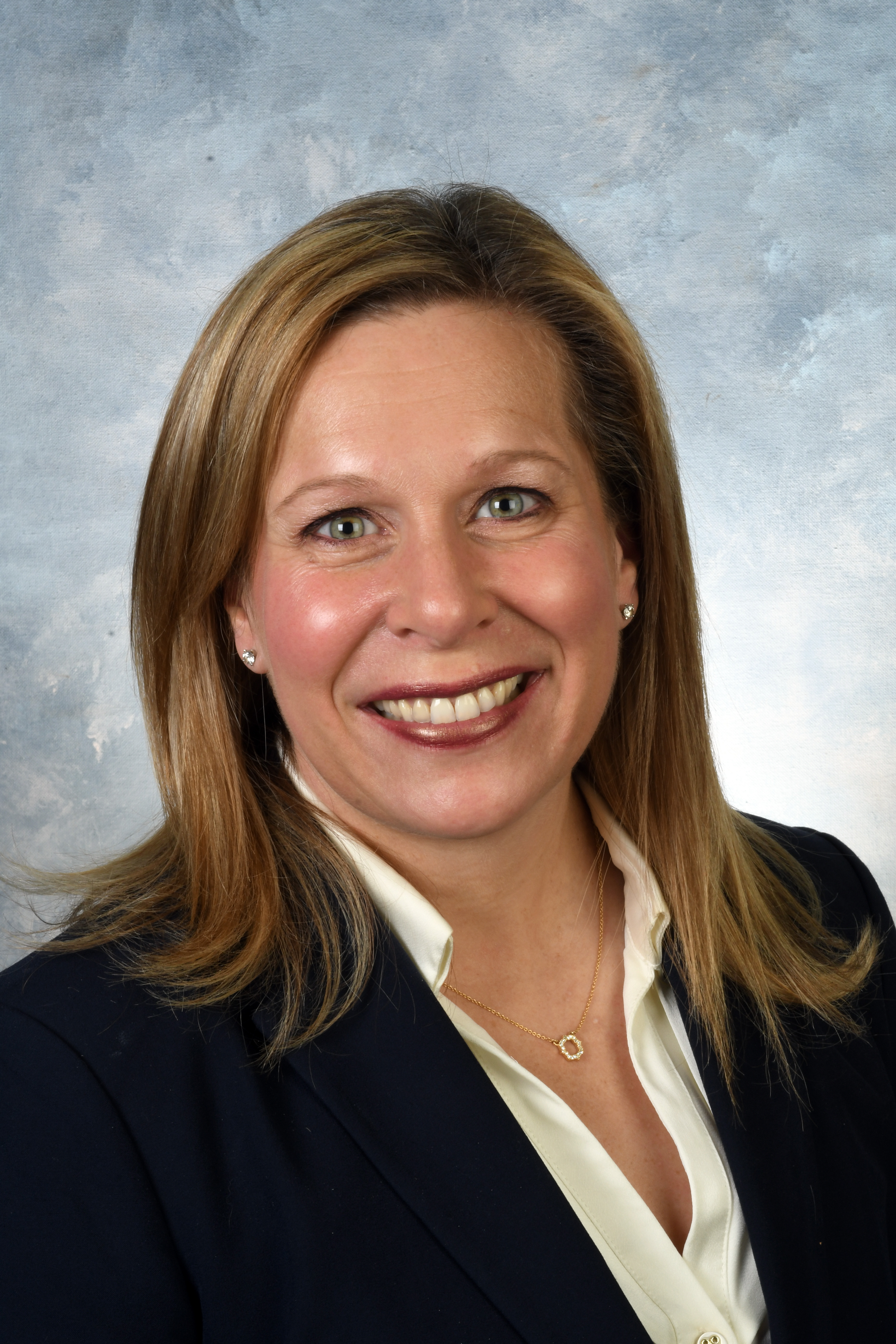
- Official portrait, 2022

Member of the Kentucky Senate from the 12th district
- Incumbent
- Assumed office January 1, 2023
- Preceded by: Alice Forgy Kerr

Member of the Lexington-Fayette Urban County Council from the 10th district
- In office January 2015 – January 1, 2023
- Preceded by: Harry Clarke
- Succeeded by: Dave Sevigny

Personal details
- Born: February 15, 1978 (age 48) Lexington, Kentucky, U.S.
- Party: Republican
- Education: Hillsdale College (BA); University of Kentucky (MA)

Amanda Mays Bledsoe (born February 15, 1978) is an American politician from Kentucky. She is a member of the Republican Party and has represented District 12 in the Kentucky Senate since January 1, 2023. She was a member of the Lexington-Fayette Urban County Council from the 10th district from 2015 to 2023.

== Background ==
Bledsoe is a graduate of the University of Kentucky and resides in the city of Lexington. Her experience includes working as a senior policy analyst and an adjunct instructor.
