= Gary Boswell =

American politician (born 1954)

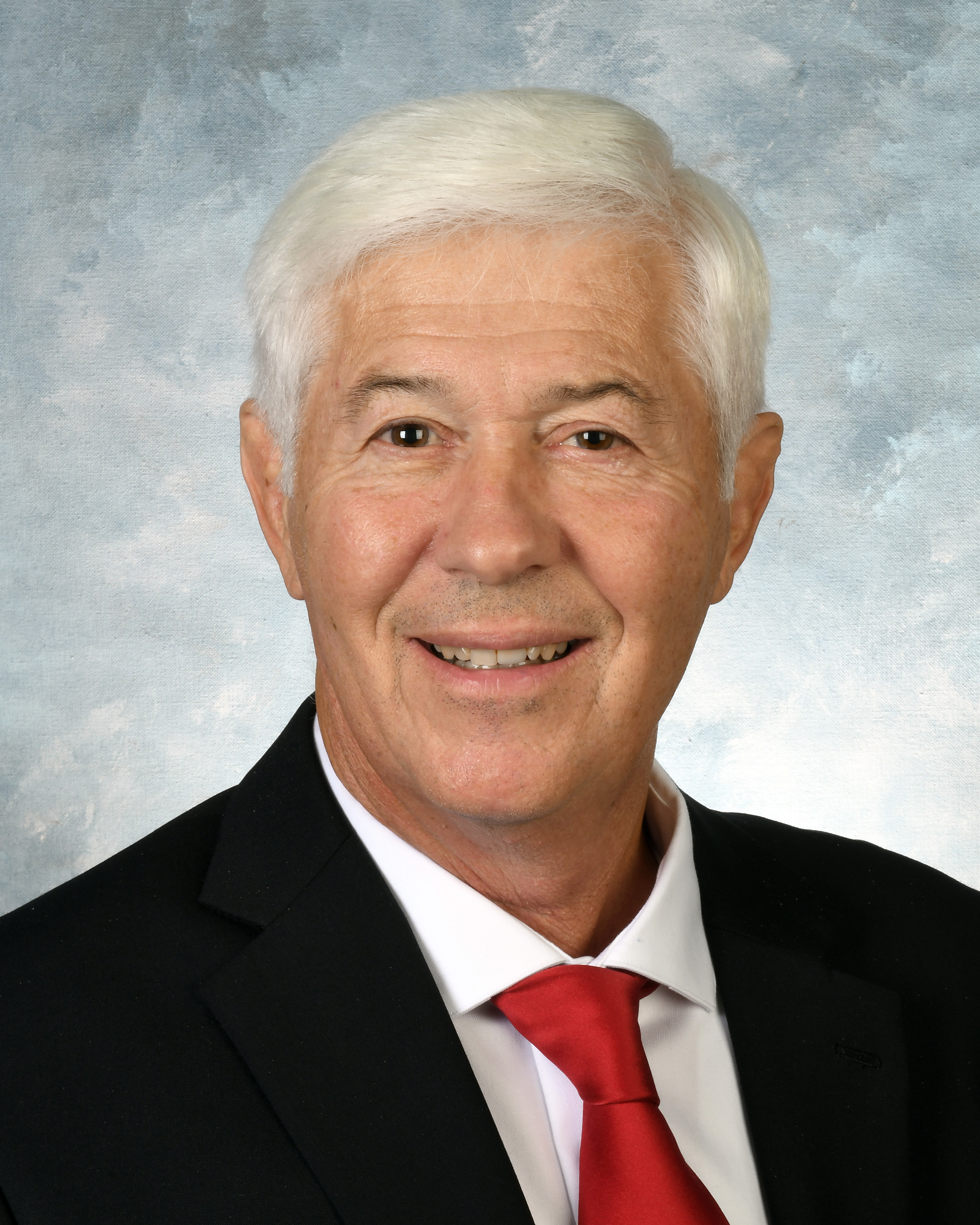
- Official portrait, 2022

Member of the Kentucky Senate from the 8th district
- Incumbent
- Assumed office January 1, 2023
- Preceded by: Matt Castlen

Personal details
- Born: June 19, 1954 (age 72)
- Party: Republican

Gary M. Boswell (born June 19, 1954) is an American politician from Kentucky. He is a Republican who has represented District 8 in the Kentucky Senate since January 1, 2023. He is also a farmer and real estate developer in Owensboro, Kentucky.
