= Paul Richardson =

Paul Richardson may refer to:

- Paul Richardson Sr. (born 1969), American football player
- Paul Richardson (American football) (born 1992), American football player, and son of the above
- Paul Richardson (organist) (1932–2006), home field organist for the Philadelphia Phillies, 1970–2005
- Paul Richardson (priest) (born 1947), British Roman Catholic priest and former Anglican bishop
- Paul Richardson (footballer) (born 1949), English football player
- Paul Richardson (recorder maker) (born 1947), musical instrument maker
- Paul Richardson (businessman) (born 1959), British businessman and entrepreneur
- Paul Richardson (politician) (1916–2003), member of the Kentucky House of Representatives
