= Stanley Cole (architect) =

American architect (1924–2013)

Stanley M. Cole (1924 – March 12, 2013) was an American architect and principal of the EwingCole architectural firm. Cole was the chief architect and designer of Citizens Bank Park, which opened on April 3, 2004, as the home of the Philadelphia Phillies.

== Background ==
Cole was born in 1924 in Brooklyn, New York. He served in the U.S. Army Air Forces' Fifth Air Force from 1942 until 1945 during World War II. During the war, Cole participated in fifty-eight air raids on Japanese forces in New Guinea, including several November 1943 bombing missions on Rabaul, on the nearby island of New Britain. He was the recipient of three Bronze Service Stars, the Distinguished Flying Cross, and the Air Medal.

Earning his bachelor's degree in architecture and engineering from Pennsylvania State University in 1948 Cole was hired by the firm, Harrison & Abromowitz, based in New York City after graduation, where he helped design a portion of the United Nations headquarters. He eventually joined the chemical firm, Rohm & Haas, as a company in-house architect, which necessitated his move to Bristol, Pennsylvania. Rohm & Haas was planning a new headquarters located on Independence Mall in Philadelphia. Cole worked closely with architect Alexander Ewing as Ewing's project manager on the new headquarters. Ewing then hired Cole as a managing partner for his firm in 1964. The new company became known as EwingCole.

In 1970, Cole became president of EwingCole. He then served as the chairman and CEO until 1990. He remained a principal of EwingCole from 1990 until his death in March 2013.

== The Phillies ==
The Philadelphia Phillies had been a client of EwingCole since 1964, and Cole enjoyed a close relationship with the team through the company. He was a friend of Phillies president and CEO David Montgomery. The Phillies retained EwingCole and Stanley Cole to construct a new baseball stadium when they wanted to replace the aging Veterans Stadium. Cole, who was the chief architect on the project, designed the new Citizens Bank Park, a 43,651-seat stadium which opened in 2004.

Stanley Cole died from pneumonia at Paoli Hospital in Paoli, Pennsylvania, on March 12, 2013, at the age of 89. He was survived by his wife of 29 years, Nadene Carey; two daughters, Jackie Prosser and Stacey Tormollan; and son, Bradley Cole.
