= Drew Graham =

American politician

Member of the Kentucky House of Representatives from the 73rd district
- In office January 1, 1993 – January 1, 1999
- Preceded by: Paul Richardson
- Succeeded by: R. J. Palmer

Personal details
- Party: Democratic

Drew Graham (born 1961) is an American politician from Kentucky who was a member of the Kentucky House of Representatives from 1993 to 1999. Graham was first elected in 1992 after defeating incumbent representative Paul Richardson in the May primary election. He did not seek reelection in 1998, instead successfully running for Judge/Executive of Clark County.
