= Citizens Bank Park =

Baseball park in Philadelphia, United States

- CBP; The Bank

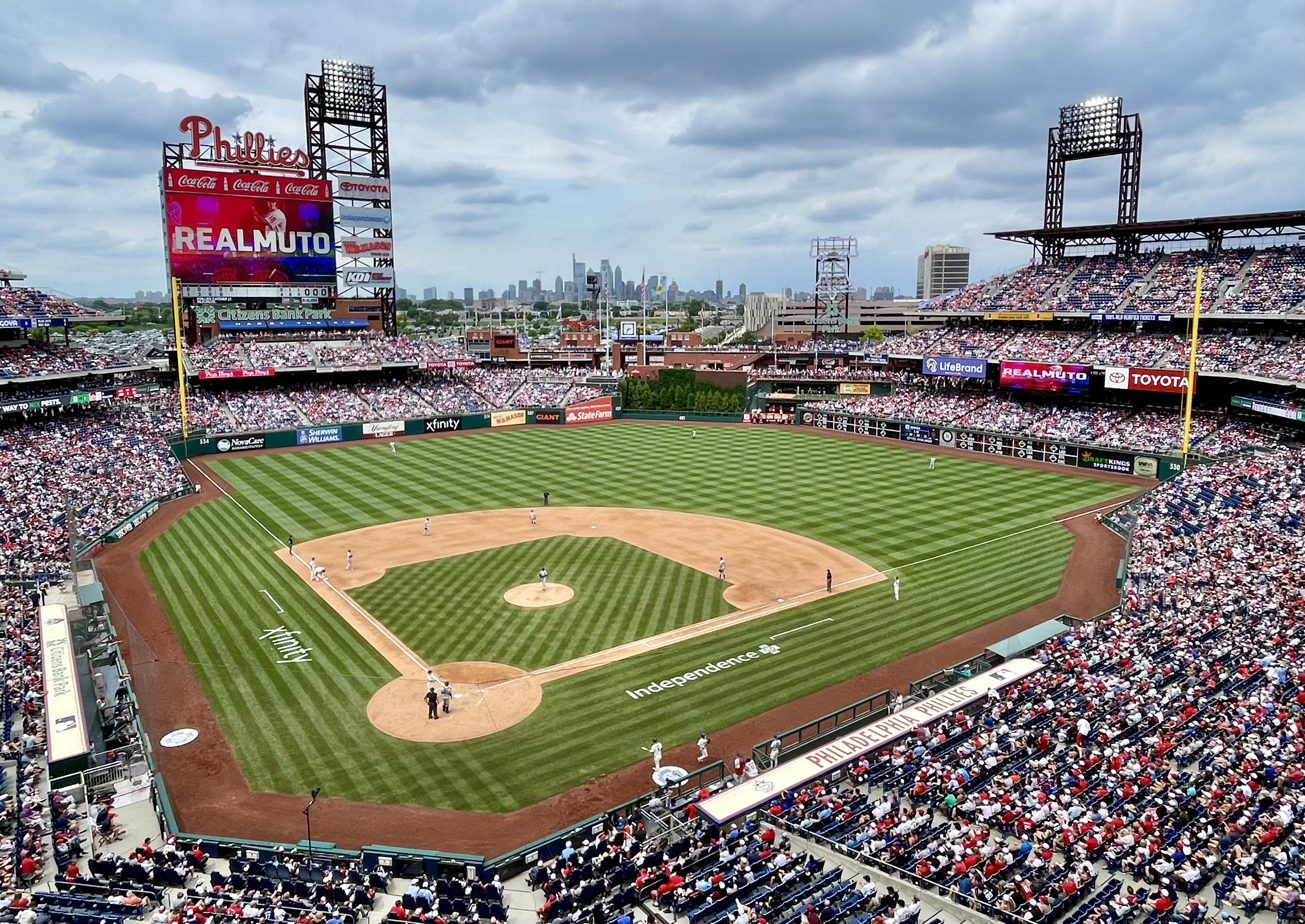
- Citizens Bank Park in South Philadelphia in June 2021

- Location in Philadelphia Location in Pennsylvania Location in the United States
- Address: One Citizens Bank Way
- Location: Philadelphia, Pennsylvania, U.S.
- Coordinates: 39°54′21″N 75°9′59″W
- Owner: City of Philadelphia
- Operator: Global Spectrum
- Capacity: 42,901 (2023–present); 42,792 (2019–2021); 43,035 (2018); 43,651 (2011–2017); 43,647 (2007–2010); 43,308 (2006); 43,500 (2004–2005)
- Surface: Kentucky bluegrass (2004–2012, 2016–present); Riviera Bermuda grass (2012–2016)
- Scoreboard: Left Field HD display Board: 152 ft (46 m) x 86 ft (26 m); 13,072 sq ft (1,214.4 m^{2}); Daktronics left field scoreboard message board, baseline message boards, HD displays and out-of-town scoreboards
- Record attendance: Hockey: 46,967 (January 2, 2012) 2012 NHL Winter Classic; Baseball: 46,575 (October 2, 2011) 2011 NLDS; Concert: 48,206 (June 26, 2026) Noah Kahan's The Great Divide Tour
- Field size: Left field foul pole 329 feet (100 m); Left field power alley 374 feet (114 m); Monty's Angle (left of CF to LCF); 409 feet (125 m) – 381 feet (116 m) – 387 feet (118 m); Center field, straightaway 401 feet (122 m); Right field power alley 369 feet (112 m); Right field foul pole 330 feet (101 m)
- Public transit: SEPTA Metro: (NRG Station); SEPTA bus: 4, 45, 68

Construction
- Groundbreaking: June 28, 2001
- Opened: April 3, 2004
- Cost: US$458 million ($781 million in 2025 dollars)
- Architects: EwingCole (formerly Ewing Cole Cherry Brott) from Philadelphia and HOK Sport; Agoos Lovera Architects of Philadelphia
- Project manager: Stranix Associates
- General contractors: L. F. Driscoll and Hunt Construction Group
- Main contractors: Synterra, Ltd. Don Todd Associates, Inc.

Tenant
- Philadelphia Phillies (MLB) (2004–present)

Website
- mlb.com/phillies/ballpark

Citizens Bank Park is a baseball stadium in Philadelphia, Pennsylvania, United States. Home to Major League Baseball's Philadelphia Phillies, the stadium opened April 3, 2004.

The 42,901-seat ballpark was built to replace the 33-year-old Veterans Stadium, a multipurpose football and baseball facility that was demolished in 2004. Citizens Bank Park features a natural grass-and-dirt playing field and Philadelphia-style food stands that serve cheesesteak sandwiches, hoagies, Tastykakes, soft pretzels, Yards and Yuengling beer, and other regional specialties.

The ballpark is named after Citizens Bank, N.A.. It sits on the northeast corner of the South Philadelphia Sports Complex, which includes Lincoln Financial Field, Xfinity Mobile Arena, and Stateside Live!, a dining and entertainment venue which often serves as a media hub for various live broadcasts.

== History ==
=== Planning ===
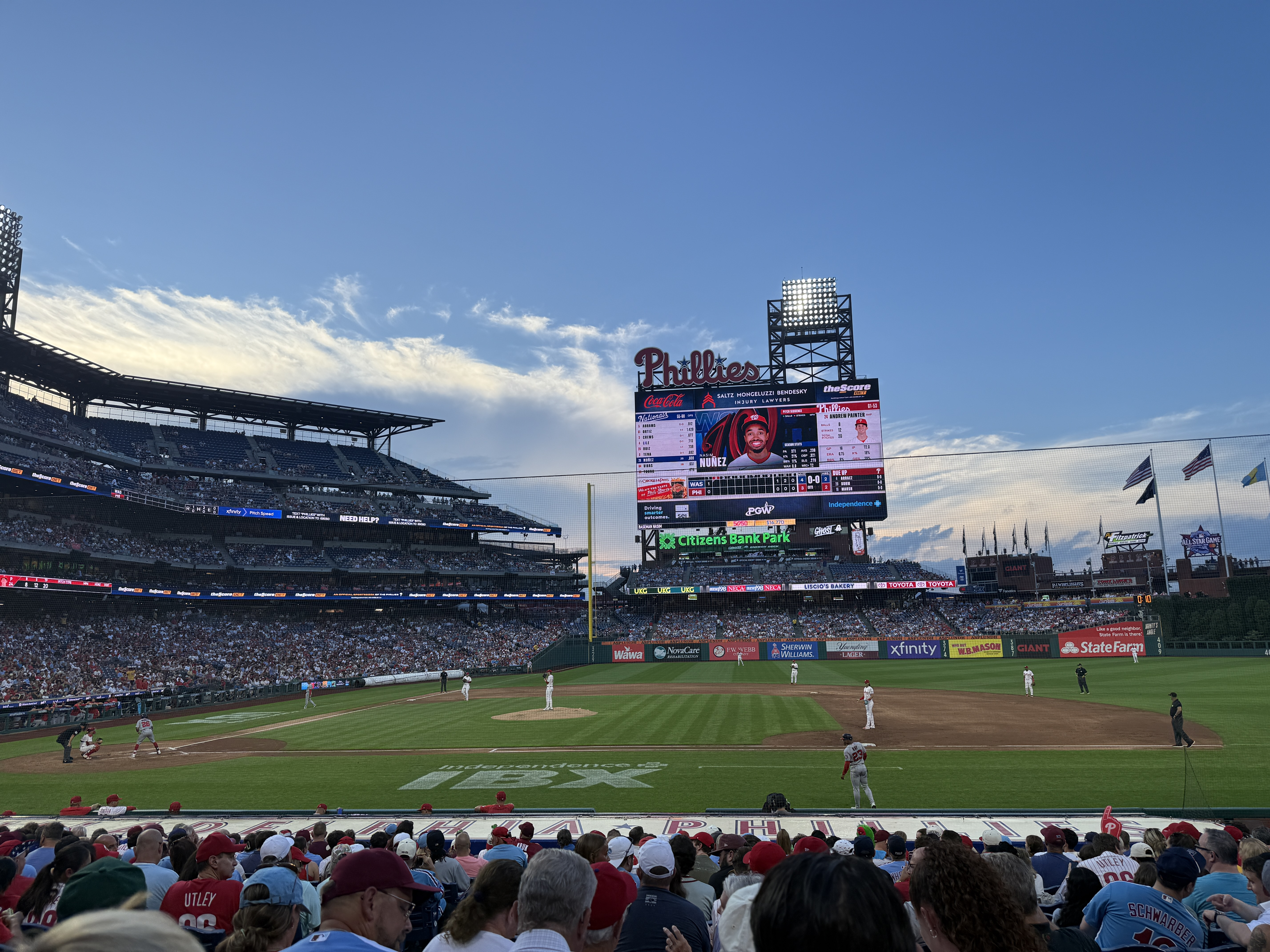
The Phillies taking on the Washington Nationals at Citizens Bank Park in August 2026

In 1999, the owners of the Phillies and the Philadelphia Eagles of the NFL joined their western Pennsylvania counterparts, the owners of the Pittsburgh Pirates and Pittsburgh Steelers, in asking state and local governments to replace Veterans Stadium and Three Rivers Stadium in Pittsburgh with separate baseball and football stadiums. Pressure for new Philadelphia stadiums increased after a railing collapsed at "The Vet" during the 1998 Army–Navy Game, injuring eight cadets. The Pirates owners threatened to leave Pittsburgh in 1997, helping to convince the state legislature to approve funding for the four proposed stadiums. With their architectural plans already in place, Allegheny County and the City of Pittsburgh approved the pacts swiftly. Still, debate among Philadelphia's city leaders continued into 2001, when Pittsburgh opened its stadiums (PNC Park for the Pirates and Heinz Field for the Steelers). The Eagles ultimately agreed to the site of a former food warehouse slightly southeast of Veterans Stadium. Lincoln Financial Field celebrated its grand opening in August 2003.

The Phillies originally sought to build a downtown ballpark similar to those in Baltimore, Denver, Cincinnati, Cleveland, Detroit, and San Francisco. Various locations were proposed, including Broad and Spring Garden streets; Spring Garden and Delaware Avenue; and next to 30th Street Station on the site of the former main post office. The team and the city announced that the site would be at 13th and Vine streets in Chinatown, just north of Interstate 676, within walking distance of Center City. There was considerable support for a downtown ball park from business and labor and the city at large. But Chinatown residents protested, fearing a new ballpark would destroy their neighborhood. The City and team eventually settled on building the ballpark at the South Philadelphia Sports Complex on the site of another abandoned food warehouse. In the years that followed, residents, fans, and owner Bill Giles expressed regret that the new ballpark was not located in Center City Philadelphia. Still, the team set attendance records in 2010 (3,647,249 fans, averaging 45,028) with all home games sold out for the first time in the team's 81-year history, extending a sellout streak dating to July 2009 to 123.

Chief architect of the new stadium was EwingCole's Stanley Cole. The new park's design was unveiled at a groundbreaking ceremonies on June 28, 2001. After the game that evening, the location of the left-field foul pole, 325 feet (99 m) from home plate, was unveiled at the outset of the team's annual Fourth of July fireworks display. On June 17, 2003, Citizens Bank agreed to a 25-year, US $95 million deal for the park's naming rights and advertising on billboards, telecasts, radio broadcasts, and publications. The ballpark was officially topped off on August 12, 2003, and opened in April 2004.

=== Modifications ===
Shortly after the park opened in 2004, the bullpens were reassigned so the Phillies' pitchers used the lower pen and visitors used the upper pen. This was done to give Phillies' pitchers a better view of the game and to protect them from heckling by fans. However, the team forgot to rewire the bullpen phones after the bullpens were reassigned, so during the first game, the dugout coaches had to communicate with the bullpens by hand signals.

In its first years, Citizens Bank Park allowed 218 home runs in 2004 and 201 in 2005, more than half to left-field. After the 2005 season, the left-field wall was moved back 5 feet (1.5 m).

Even with these modifications, the park has a reputation as one of the most hitter-friendly parks in baseball. In 2009, it gave up 149 home runs, the most in the National League and second in the majors behind only the new Yankee Stadium, but has been neutral since, with a .997 park factor in 2011.

=== Events ===
This plaque at Citizens Bank Park marks the landing point of Jim Thome's 400th career home run on June 14, 2004

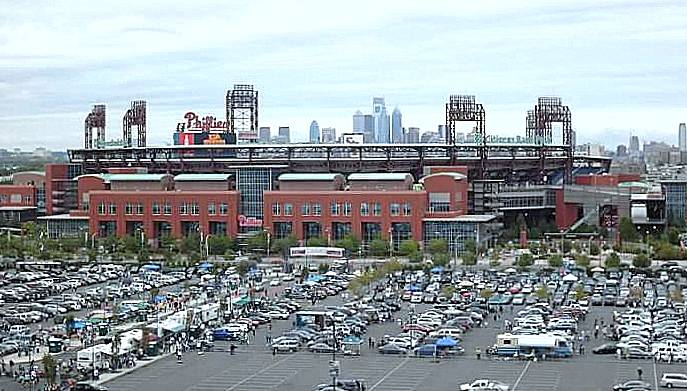
Citizens Bank Park parking lot (forefront) and the stadium (background) in 2010

- April 12, 2004, 1:32 PM: Randy Wolf of the Phillies threw the first regular-season pitch at Citizens Bank Park to D'Angelo Jiménez of the Cincinnati Reds, who got the park's first hit, a lead-off ground-rule double. Jiménez scored the park's first run later in the inning on a wild pitch. Bobby Abreu of the Phillies hit the first home run in the bottom of the first inning, which also served as the franchise's first hit at Citizens Bank Park. Reds pitcher Paul Wilson earned the first win in that game and Danny Graves earned the park's first save.
- June 14, 2004: Phillies first baseman Jim Thome hit his 400th career home run into the left-center field seats at Citizens Bank Park. The home run came before a 2-hour, 18-minute rain delay that started when the game was not yet official. The teams waited out that delay and two more to finish the game at 2:06 am.
- June 20, 2004: The first inside-the-park home run at the stadium was hit by Jimmy Rollins against the Kansas City Royals.
- April 4, 2005: The Washington Nationals played their first regular season game as a new team after moving from Montreal at Citizens Bank Park, and the Phillies won the game 8-4.
- May 9, 2005: In the first Minor League Baseball game at the park, the Eastern League Reading Phillies defeat the Trenton Thunder, 5–3.
- September 14, 2005: Andruw Jones of the Atlanta Braves hit his 300th career home run, which sailed 430 feet (130 m) off Phils reliever Geoff Geary in a 12–4 Phillies win. The ball landed in the upper deck in left field.
- July 15, 2007: The Phillies lost their 10,000th regular-season game to the St. Louis Cardinals, 10–2, the first time a professional sports franchise reached that mark.
- October 3, 2007: The park hosted its first postseason game as the Colorado Rockies defeated the Phillies 4–2 in Game 1 of the 2007 NLDS.
- October 25, 2008: The park hosted its first World Series game, as the Phillies defeated the Tampa Bay Rays, 5–4 in Game 3. Before the game, country music singer Tim McGraw, the son of the late Phillies closer Tug McGraw, who had recorded the last out in the Phillies' World Series victory in 1980, took a handful of his dad's ashes and spread them on the pitcher's mound just before handing the ball used in throwing out the ceremonial first pitch in the game to Steve Carlton.
- October 29, 2008, 9:58 PM: In Game 5 of the 2008 World Series, Phillies closer Brad Lidge struck out Eric Hinske of the Rays to complete a 4–3 victory and clinch the Phillies' second World Series championship in franchise history. Game 5 had originally started on October 27, but was stopped in the bottom of the sixth inning due to rain, and would remain suspended before resuming play two nights later. The Phillies held a celebration at the park at the conclusion of their championship parade on October 31.

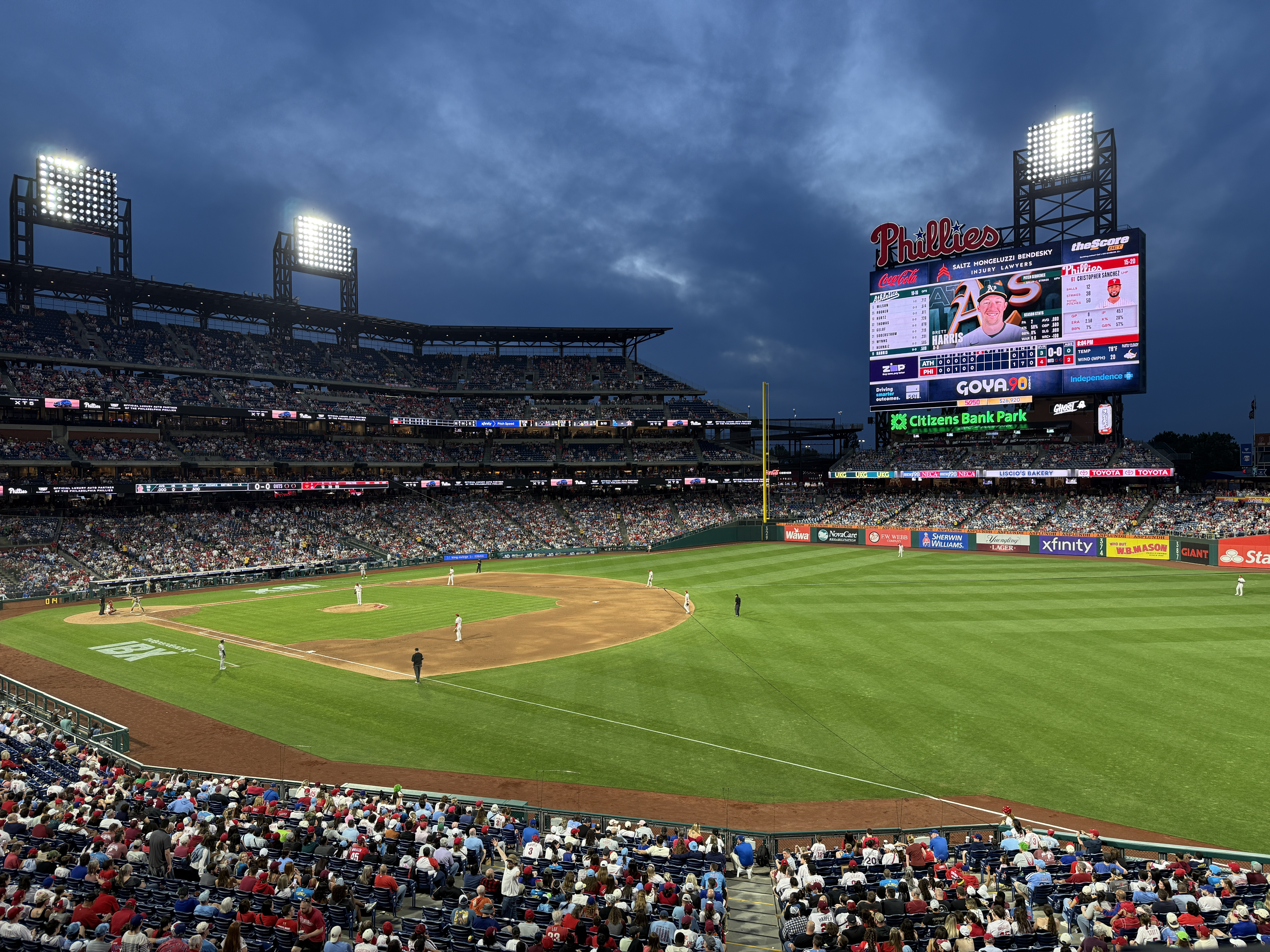
The Phillies taking on the Athletics at Citizens Bank Park in May 2026

- June 25, 2010: Citizens Bank Park hosted the first regular-season game in a National League stadium in which the designated hitter was used; MLB moved the Phillies' series against the Toronto Blue Jays from Rogers Centre to Philadelphia, citing security concerns for the G-20 Summit. Ryan Howard served as the first DH in a National League ballpark. Despite playing in their park, Philadelphia was designated as the road team.
- October 6, 2010: The first no-hitter at Citizens Bank Park was thrown by Roy Halladay against the Cincinnati Reds in Game 1 of the 2010 NLDS.
- May 1, 2011: During a game between the Phillies and the rival New York Mets, the 45,713 fans in attendance began to chant "U-S-A!" following the news that Osama bin Laden, the mastermind of the September 11 attacks, had been killed by U.S. special forces in Pakistan.
- October 2, 2011: A crowd of 46,575 attended Game 2 of the 2011 NLDS between the Phillies and the St. Louis Cardinals. As of 2026, this remains the highest-attended baseball game in the park's history.
- May 25, 2014: Los Angeles Dodgers pitcher Josh Beckett threw the first regular season no-hitter in the ballpark's history. He was also the first opposing pitcher to throw a no-hitter.
- April 16, 2019: MLB announced that Citizens Bank Park would host the 2026 Major League Baseball All-Star Game to commemorate the 250th anniversary of the signing of the Declaration of Independence.
- November 2, 2022: In Game 4 of the 2022 World Series, Houston Astros starting pitcher Cristian Javier, combined with bullpen relief from Bryan Abreu, Rafael Montero, and Ryan Pressly, threw a no-hitter, the first in a World Series game since Don Larsen's perfect game in Game 5 of the 1956 World Series.
- August 9, 2023: In his first home start with the Phillies, Michael Lorenzen threw a no-hitter against the Washington Nationals, the stadium's fourth no-hitter and the second by a Phillies pitcher.
- August 30, 2023: Phillies designated hitter Bryce Harper hit his 300th career home run into the right-center field seats in a game against the Los Angeles Angels.
- August 15, 2024: Weston Wilson became the first rookie to hit for the cycle in Phillies history. It was the second Phillies cycle hit in Citizens Bank Park and the 10th cycle in Phillies history.

== Features ==
=== Ashburn Alley ===
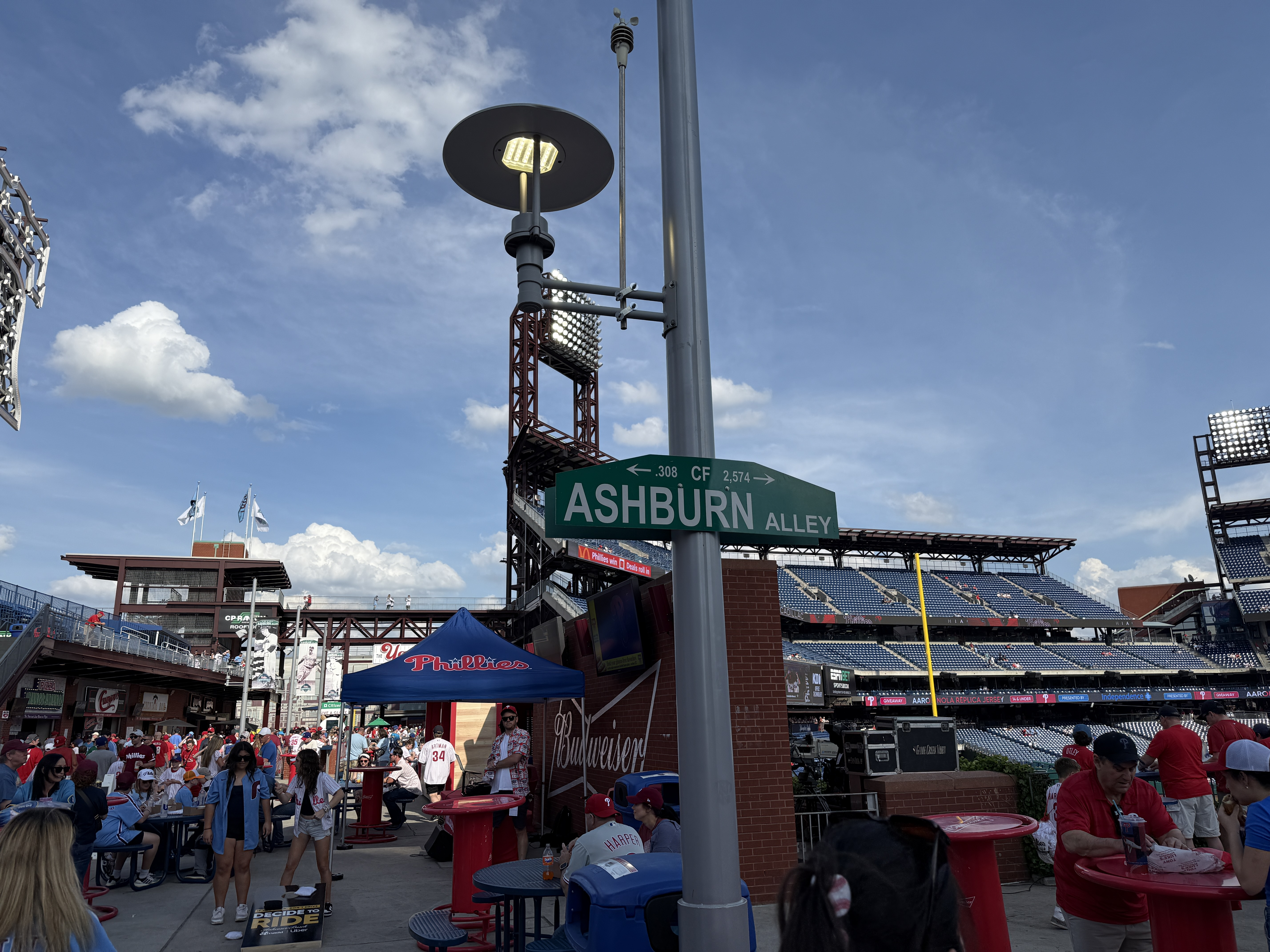
Ashburn Alley

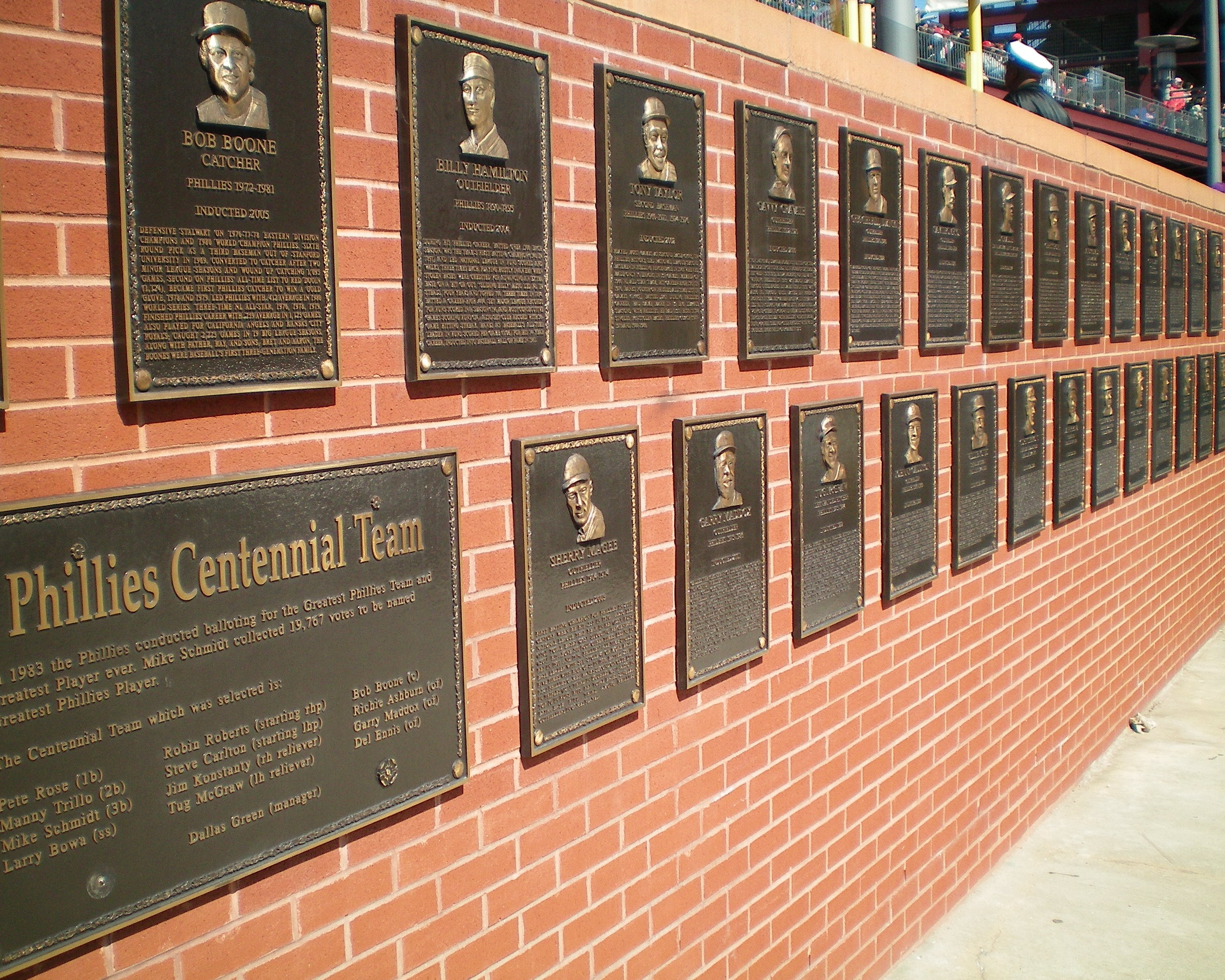
The Philadelphia Baseball Wall of Fame at Citizens Bank Park

Behind center field is Ashburn Alley, named for Phillies Hall of Fame center fielder Richie Ashburn, who played for the team from 1948 to 1959 and was a Phillies broadcaster from 1963 until his death in 1997. It is seen by Phillies fans as a sop to their desire to see the stadium named for Ashburn.

Ashburn Alley is named for the slightly-overgrown grass that bordered the third base line at Shibe Park, where Ashburn was famous for laying down bunts that stayed fair. The new Ashburn Alley, located near Ashburn's defensive position, is a walkway with restaurants, games and memorabilia from Phillies history. Ashburn Alley also has a memorabilia shop and a large bronze statue of Ashburn directly behind center field, as well as the U.S. flag, the flags of the Commonwealth of Pennsylvania and the City of Philadelphia, a POW/MIA flag, and the flags from the Phillies' championships.

Year	Event	Championship
1915	1915 World Series	National League Champion
1950	1950 World Series	National League Champion
1976	1976 NLCS	National League East Division Champion
1977	1977 NLCS	National League East Division Champion
1978	1978 NLCS	National League East Division Champion
1980	1980 World Series	World Series Champion
1981	1981 NLDS	National League East Division Co-Champion
1983	1983 World Series	National League Champion
1993	1993 World Series	National League Champion
2007	2007 NLDS	National League East Division Champion
2008	2008 World Series	World Series Champion
2009	2009 World Series	National League Champion
2010	2010 NLCS	National League East Division Champion
2011	2011 NLDS	National League East Division Champion
2022	2022 World Series	National League Champion
2023	2023 NLCS	National League Division Series Champion
2024	2024 NLDS	National League East Division Champion
2025	2025 NLDS	National League East Division Champion

In 2004 and 2005, organist Paul Richardson performed from Ashburn Alley, as Citizens Bank Park was built without an organ booth.

=== Other attractions ===
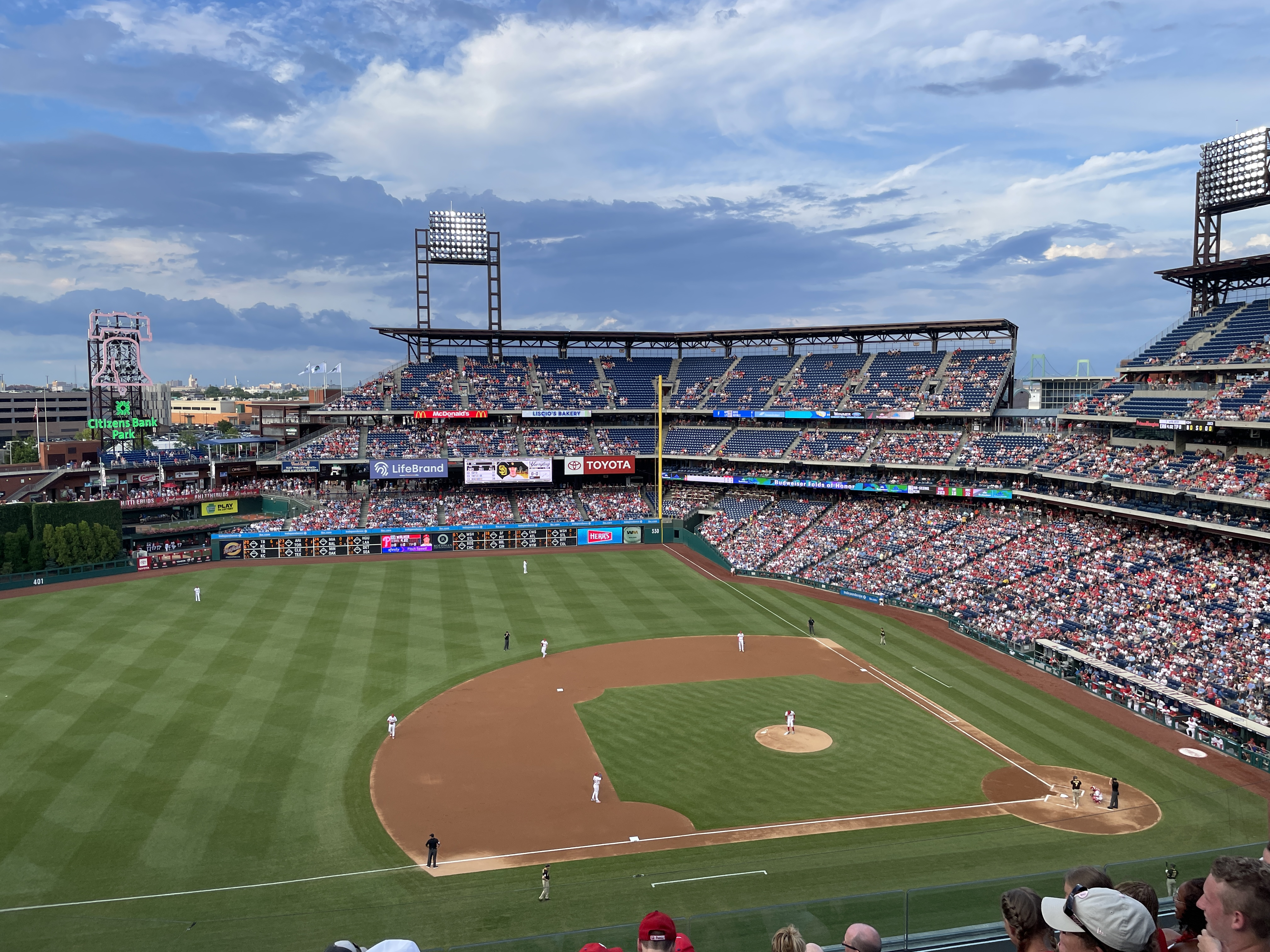
The Phillies taking on the San Diego Padres at Citizens Bank Park in July 2023

- Philadelphia Insurance and Hall of Fame Clubs: Two premium seating areas in the park. The Philadelphia Insurance Club, located behind home plate, includes an air-conditioned indoor club area with exclusive food and souvenir shops where ticket holders can watch batting practice on either side of the club (especially on rainy days). There are a total of 1,164 seats in the Philadelphia Insurance Club. A second level, called the Hall of Fame Club, is located between Sections 212 through 232. This air-conditioned area features exclusive food and souvenir stands akin to the Philadelphia Insurance Club, and also houses memorabilia from the teams' past going back to the 1880s, along with memorabilia from the Philadelphia Athletics. The Hall of Fame Club contains 6,600 seats. In addition to being an attraction to fans, the Hall of Fame level also houses the A/V crew on the first-base side of that level that controls the scoreboard and all other monitors throughout the park and is where Dan Baker announces the game, as well as the press box, television, and radio booths.
- High and Inside Pub: Located on the Terrace Level behind home plate, the area is open to groups before the ballgame, and the public once the games start.
- Liberty Bell: Standing 102 feet (31 m) above street level, this 52-foot-tall (16 m) by 35-foot-wide (11 m) mechanical, lighted replica of the Liberty Bell "rings" and lights up after every Phillies home run and victory. In recent years, the Phillies have promoted the hashtag "#RingTheBell".
- New Era Phillies Team Store and '47 Alley Store: The team store is open year-round, and serves as the starting point for tours of the ballpark. The bi-level store features regular merchandise on the first level and player jerseys as well as Phanatic-themed items on the second level, while the Alley Store is open during all home games and features authentic replicas of older Phillies jerseys made by the famous Philadelphia retailer of vintage uniform shirts and caps, Mitchell and Ness, as well as other items. During the off-season, customizable jerseys are available in the main store when a stand next to the store is open during the season.
- McFadden's Bar and Grille: Open year-round, this restaurant combined the McFadden's and Zanzibar Blue menus at the Third Base Gate. Since its opening, it has become a popular post-game (or event) site for the nearby Xfinity Mobile Arena and Lincoln Financial Field. Closed in 2018.
- Pass and Stow: Located at the former site of McFadden's Bar and Grille. Pass and Stow is an indoor bar and restaurant while also consisting of an outdoor bar and pizza oven. It is located inside of the entrance of the third base gate. Opened in 2019.
- Phanatic Phun Zone: Located at the First Base Gate plaza, this playground offers fun for guests eight years old and younger with slides, climb, explore and play games. A separate area for toddlers three years old and younger is found inside. Closed and later replaced by King Swings Playground as of 2026.
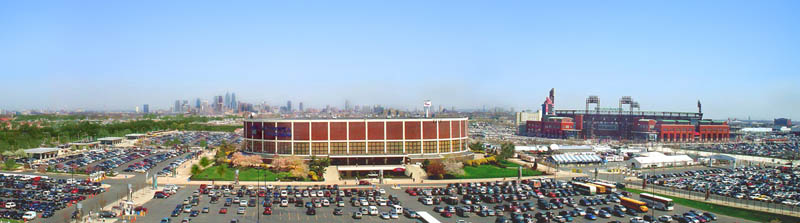
When it opened in 2004, Citizens Bank Park (right) was the newest of the four Philadelphia sports stadiums located in the South Philadelphia Sports Complex; the four-decade-old Spectrum (center) was the oldest (opened 1967, closed 2009, demolished 2011); Lincoln Financial Field (opened 2003), home of the Philadelphia Eagles, can be seen in the distant right; to the left is tree-lined South Broad Street, the world's longest straight street, and the expansive Center City skyline in this photo taken from the rooftop of the Xfinity Mobile Arena (opened in 1996), home of the Philadelphia 76ers and Philadelphia Flyers.

=== Statues ===
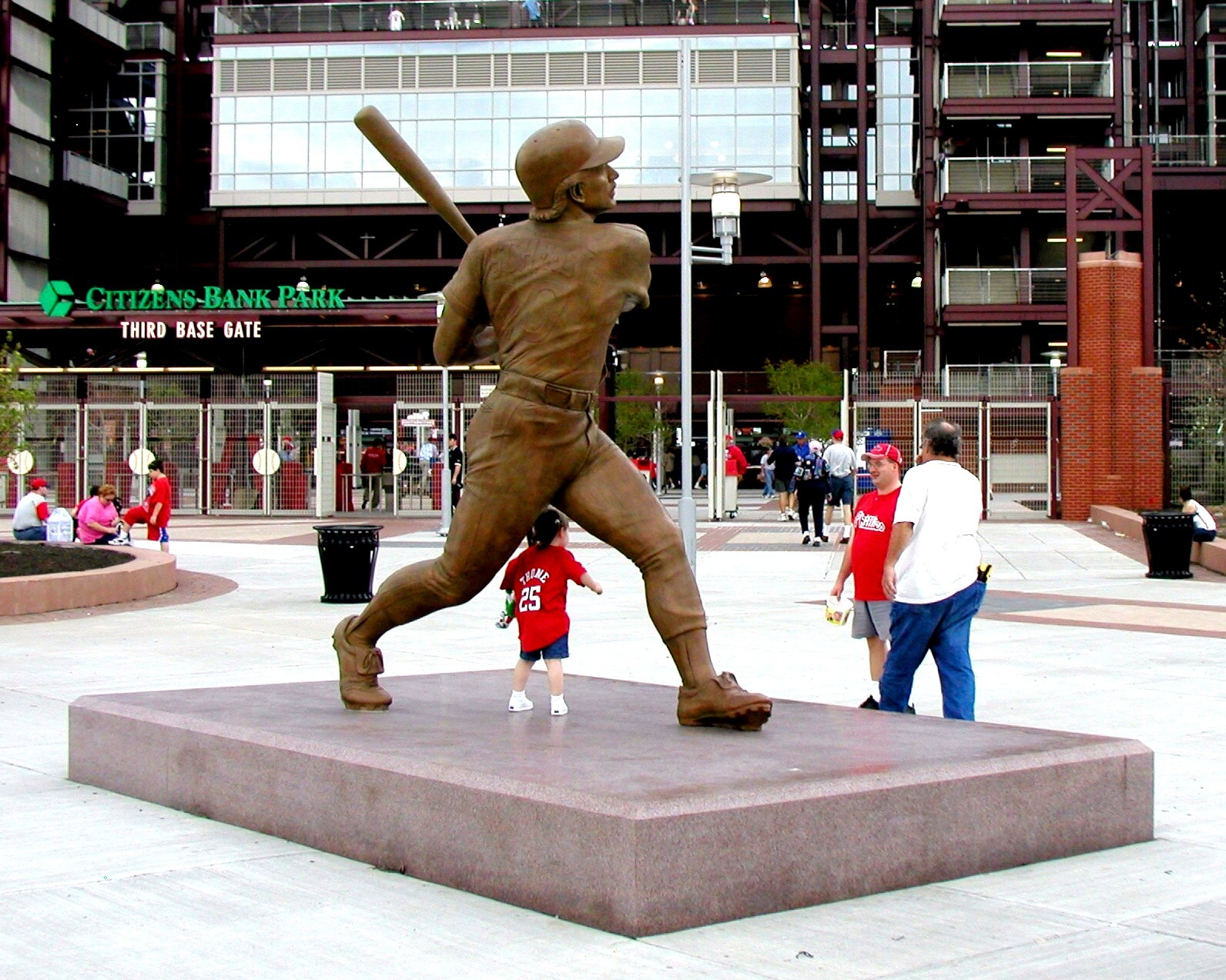
Statue of Mike Schmidt by Zenos Frudakis at Citizens Bank Park

In addition to the Richie Ashburn statue in Ashburn Alley, statues of three other famous Phillies, Robin Roberts (at the First Base Gate), Mike Schmidt (at the Third Base Gate), and Steve Carlton (at the Left Field Gate), are located outside of the facility. Each of the 10-foot-high (3.0 m) statues were made by local sculptor Zenos Frudakis and cast at Laran Bronze in nearby Chester. Other art found throughout the park includes tile mosaics, murals and terrazzo floors with outlined images of famous players in Phillies history.

In April 2011, the Phillies accepted a gift of a fan-underwritten 7.5-foot-tall (2.3 m) bronze statue of legendary broadcaster Harry Kalas. Created by noted local sculptor Lawrence Nowlan and cast at Laran Bronze, it was placed behind Section 141, near the restaurant that bears Kalas' name, after a dedication held on August 16, 2011, before a game against the Arizona Diamondbacks. The statue was unveiled two days later than originally scheduled (the originally-scheduled date is on a plaque on the ground below the statue) because of a rained-out game between the Phillies and the Washington Nationals.

=== Green stadium ===
The Philadelphia Phillies are the first Major League Baseball team to join the Environmental Protection Agency's Green Power Partnership Program which motivates organizations across the world to purchase green power in order to minimize environmental impact. The Phillies announced on April 30, 2008, that their home field, Citizens Bank Park, will be powered with 20 million kilowatt-hours (kWh) of green energy purchased in Green-e Energy Certified Renewable Certificates (RECs). The EPA said that this purchase holds the record in professional sports for the largest purchase of 100% renewable energy. The Phillies are among the top three purchasers of green power in Philadelphia, and the executive director of the Center for Resource Solutions, Arthur O'Donnell, wants "other clubs to take their lead." Aramark Corporation is the Phillies' food and beverage provider at Citizens Bank Park and they are taking major actions in improving the environmental impact of the Phillies' stadium. Glass, cardboard and plastics used during game day are recycled; frying oil is being recycled to produce biodiesel fuel, and biodegradable, recyclable, and compostable products, serviceware, and plastics have been introduced.

== Non-baseball events ==
=== Ice hockey ===
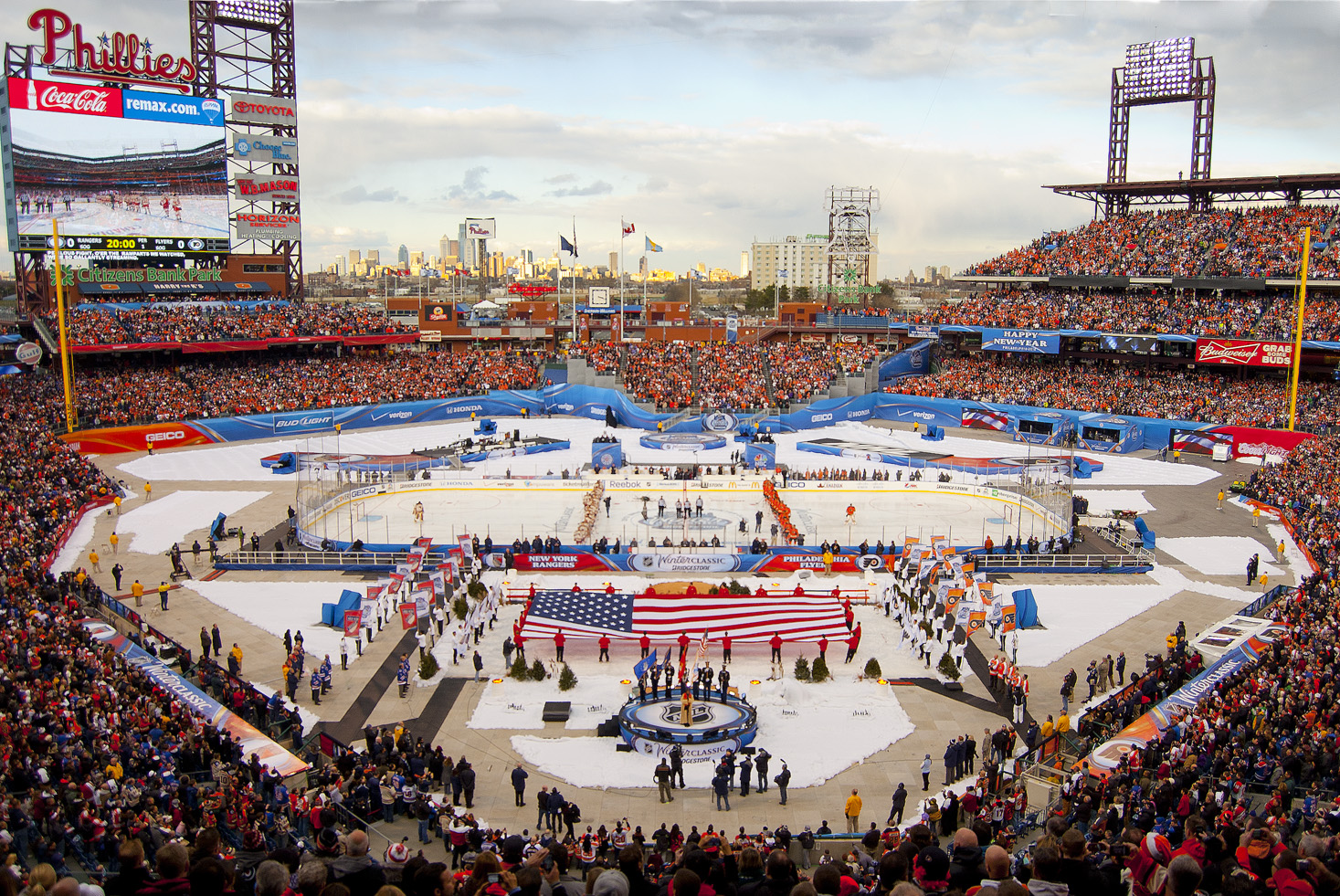
Citizens Bank Park hosting the 2012 NHL Winter Classic, featuring the Philadelphia Flyers and the New York Rangers

On January 2, 2012, Citizens Bank Park hosted the fifth annual NHL Winter Classic between long time division rivals New York Rangers and Philadelphia Flyers before an SRO crowd of 46,967. The game, which was televised throughout the United States and Canada by NBC and CBC respectively, was won by the Rangers, 3–2. Two days earlier, on New Year's Eve, 45,667 attended an alumni game played between teams made up of former Flyers and Rangers who had retired from the NHL between the 1970s and 2011 of which eight (four on each team) were also members of the Hockey Hall of Fame. The Flyers' starting goalie for the game, which was won by the Flyers alumni, 3–1, was Hall of Famer Bernie Parent. He made his first on ice appearance since his playing career ended prematurely due to an eye injury suffered during a game against the Rangers played at the neighboring (although since demolished) Spectrum in February 1979.

Four days after the 2012 NHL Winter Classic game, a third sell out crowd of 45,663 filled the Park on January 6 to watch the Flyers' AHL farm team, the Adirondack Phantoms, defeat the Hershey Bears, 4–3, in overtime. That crowd exceeded by a factor of more than two the previous largest gathering (21,673) to ever attend an AHL game since the league was established in 1936. With the normal 43,651 baseball seating capacity of the Park having been increased by more than 3,000 with the installation of temporary bleachers built over the bullpen area in center field, the trio of outdoor hockey games drew a combined total of 138,296 over the week of Winter Classic events.

=== Concerts ===
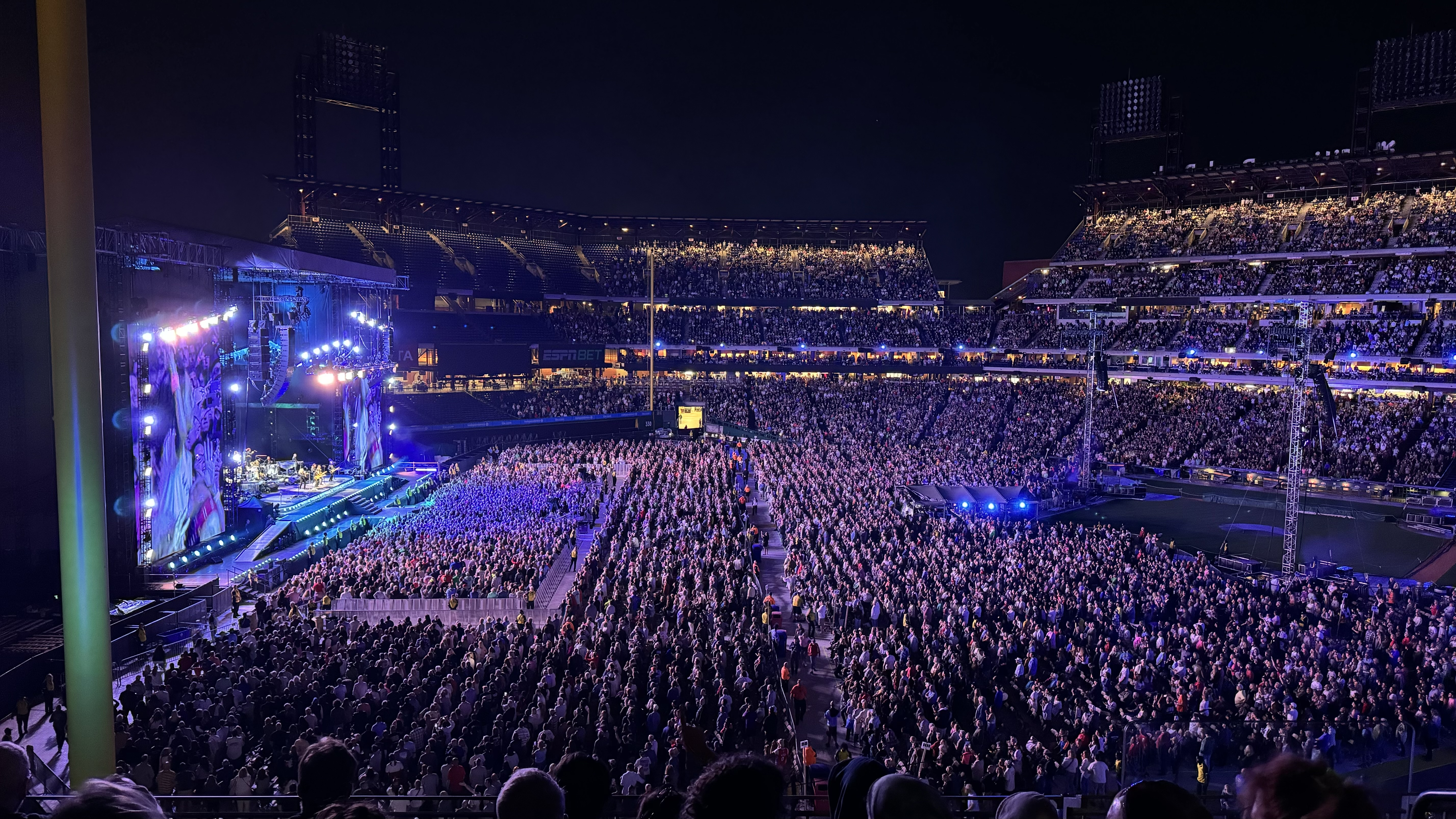
Bruce Springsteen & The E Street Band performing at Citizens Bank Park in 2024

The first concert at the park was Jimmy Buffett & The Coral Reefer Band on August 25, 2005; they returned on June 14, 2008.

The Eagles, The Dixie Chicks, and Keith Urban were scheduled to perform on June 14, 2010, but the show was cancelled.

The Jonas Brothers were scheduled to perform on August 14, 2025, but the concert was moved to Freedom Mortgage Pavilion.

Date	Artist	Opening act(s)	Tour / Concert name	Attendance	Revenue	Notes
August 25, 2005	Jimmy Buffett	—	A Salty Piece of Land Tour	85,451 / 85,451	$6,826,906	First concert at the ballpark. Sonny Landreth was the special guest.
August 27, 2005	Jimmy Buffett	—	A Salty Piece of Land Tour	85,451 / 85,451	$6,826,906	First concert at the ballpark. Sonny Landreth was the special guest.
July 15, 2006	Bon Jovi	Nickelback	Have a Nice Day Tour	39,409 / 44,238	$2,764,310	
July 19, 2007	The Police	The Fratellis; Fiction Plane	The Reunion Tour	42,599 / 42,599	$4,128,705	
June 14, 2008	Jimmy Buffett	—	Year of Still Here Tour	—	—	Sonny Landreth was the special guest.
July 30, 2009	Billy Joel; Elton John	—	Face to Face 2009	89,690 / 89,690	$11,853,455	
August 1, 2009	Billy Joel; Elton John	—	Face to Face 2009	89,690 / 89,690	$11,853,455	
July 14, 2012	Roger Waters	—	The Wall Live	36,773 / 36,773	$4,270,942	
September 2, 2012	Bruce Springsteen & The E Street Band	—	Wrecking Ball World Tour	73,296 / 78,200	$6,644,578	He became the first act to perform at every major live music venue in Philadelphia.
September 3, 2012	Bruce Springsteen & The E Street Band	—	Wrecking Ball World Tour	73,296 / 78,200	$6,644,578	He became the first act to perform at every major live music venue in Philadelphia.
August 13, 2013	Justin Timberlake; Jay-Z	DJ Cassidy	Legends of the Summer Stadium Tour	39,487 / 39,487	$4,318,455	
July 5, 2014	Beyoncé; Jay-Z	—	On the Run Tour	40,634 / 40,634	$5,141,381	
August 1, 2014	Jason Aldean	Florida Georgia Line; Tyler Farr	Burn It Down Tour	38,725 / 38,725	$2,484,731	The first ever country show to be held at the ballpark.
August 2, 2014	Billy Joel	—	Billy Joel in Concert	40,335 / 40,335	$4,122,996	
August 13, 2015	Billy Joel	—	Billy Joel in Concert	38,313 / 38,313	$3,939,042	
August 15, 2015	Zac Brown Band	The Avett Brothers	Jekyll and Hyde Tour	—	—	
July 9, 2016	Billy Joel	Christina Perri	Billy Joel in Concert	39,303 / 39,303	$4,162,880	
July 12, 2016	Paul McCartney	—	One on One Tour	38,431 / 40,615	$4,365,986	
September 7, 2016	Bruce Springsteen & The E Street Band	—	The River Tour 2016	77,670 / 80,000	$10,048,796	The first show lasted for 4 hours and 4 minutes, setting Springsteen's record for his longest show performed in North America, as well as his second longest show performed in the world. The second show featured original E Street Band drummer Vini Lopez on "It's Hard to Be a Saint in the City" and "Spirit in the Night".
September 9, 2016	Bruce Springsteen & The E Street Band	—	The River Tour 2016	77,670 / 80,000	$10,048,796	The first show lasted for 4 hours and 4 minutes, setting Springsteen's record for his longest show performed in North America, as well as his second longest show performed in the world. The second show featured original E Street Band drummer Vini Lopez on "It's Hard to Be a Saint in the City" and "Spirit in the Night".
September 8, 2017	Luke Bryan	Brett Eldredge; Craig Campbell	Huntin', Fishin' and Lovin' Every Day Tour	35,855 / 39,528	$2,743,300	
September 9, 2017	Billy Joel	—	Billy Joel in Concert	41,183 / 41,183	$4,529,573	
July 27, 2018	Billy Joel	Ben Folds	Billy Joel in Concert	—	—	His fifth consecutive annual concert and seventh overall performance at the ballpark.
July 28, 2018	Eagles	James Taylor and His All-Star Band	2018 North American Tour	—	—	
May 24, 2019	Billy Joel	Ben Folds	Billy Joel in Concert	40,969 / 40,969	$4,781,392	
May 25, 2019	The Who	Peter Wolf	Moving On! Tour	—	—	
August 20, 2021	Green Day; Fall Out Boy; Weezer	The Interrupters	Hella Mega Tour	38,063 / 38,063	$4,267,247	Originally scheduled for August 29, 2020.
August 21, 2021	Dead & Company	—	Summer Tour 2021	—	—	
June 25, 2022	Mötley Crüe; Def Leppard; Poison; Joan Jett and The Blackhearts	Classless Act	The Stadium Tour	38,076 / 38,076	$5,288,180	Originally scheduled for August 15, 2020, and then July 13, 2021.
July 10, 2022	Dead & Company	—	Summer Tour '22	—	—	
July 15, 2022	Elton John	—	Farewell Yellow Brick Road	38,870 / 38,870	$6,263,878	
September 3, 2022	Red Hot Chili Peppers	The Strokes; Thundercat	2022 Global Stadium Tour	43,425 / 43,425	$6,217,390	
June 15, 2023	Dead & Company	—	Summer Tour '23	—	—	
September 18, 2023	P!nk	Grouplove; KidCutUp; Brandi Carlile	Summer Carnival	93,000 / 93,000	$14,200,000	Highest two-day attendance
September 19, 2023	P!nk	Grouplove; KidCutUp; Brandi Carlile	Summer Carnival	93,000 / 93,000	$14,200,000	Highest two-day attendance
July 23, 2024	Def Leppard; Journey	Steve Miller Band	The Summer Stadium Tour			
August 9, 2024	Green Day	The Smashing Pumpkins; Rancid; The Linda Lindas	The Saviors Tour			The Linda Linda’s set was cancelled due to bad weather. However, Green Day let them play one song during their set.
August 21, 2024	Bruce Springsteen & The E Street Band	—	Springsteen and E Street Band 2023 Tour			Originally scheduled for August 16, 2023.
August 23, 2024	Bruce Springsteen & The E Street Band	—	Springsteen and E Street Band 2023 Tour			Originally scheduled for August 18, 2023.
May 11, 2024	Morgan Wallen	Ernest; Parker McCollum; Lauren Watkins	One Night at a Time World Tour	—	—	Originally scheduled for June 17, 2023.
May 24, 2025	Post Malone; Jelly Roll	Sierra Ferrell; Chandler Walters	Big Ass Stadium Tour	—	—	
August 15, 2025	My Chemical Romance	Alice Cooper	Long Live The Black Parade			
August 10, 2025	Chris Brown	Summer Walker; Bryson Tiller	Breezy Bowl XX	—	—	Originally scheduled for August 16, 2025.
September 19, 2025	The Lumineers	Dr. Dog; Chance Peña	Automatic World Tour	—	—	
June 26, 2026	Noah Kahan	Gigi Perez; Annabelle Dinda	The Great Divide Tour	48,206 / 48,206	—	Highest attendance

== Other stadium information ==
Public address announcer Dan Baker has introduced the players since 1972. During each player's first at-bat, Baker, in an excited voice, says, "Now batting for the Phillies, number (#), (position), (player's name)". For example, a first at-bat introduction would have Baker say, "Now batting for the Phillies, number 11, shortstop Jimmy Rollins!" During subsequent at-bats, players are only announced by their position and name, for example, "Phillies first baseman, Ryan Howard!" Baker only uses the city of the opposing team when he announces their players rather than the team nickname, for example, "Now batting for Atlanta, number ten, third baseman Chipper Jones", and makes the announcement in a more-subdued tone.

== Video boards ==
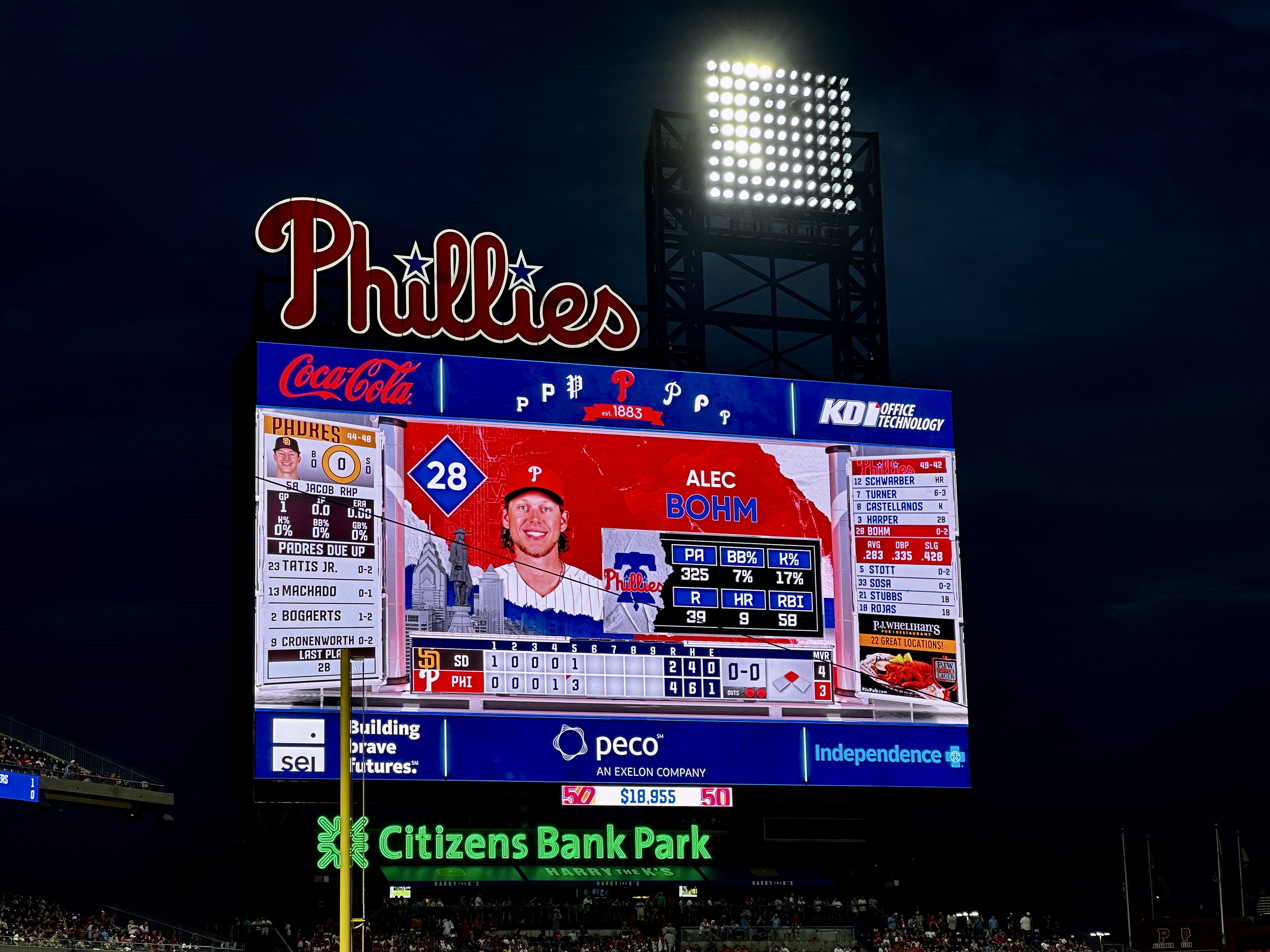
2023 PhanaVision scoreboard

In 2004 and 2005, Citizens Bank Park installed Daktronics video and message displays in the park. One of the largest incandescent displays in Major League Baseball was installed in left field that was used as a scoreboard and for giving statistics. There are also out-of-town field-level displays installed in the park that measure about 10 feet (3.0 m) high by 25 feet (7.6 m) wide.

During the 2010–2011 offseason, the Phillies replaced their incandescent scoreboard with a new HD scoreboard that cost $10 million. The new screen measured 76 feet (23 m) high and 97 feet (30 m) wide, which nearly tripled the size of the old screen, and was the second-largest HD screen in the National League at the time, after the San Diego Padres' PETCO Park screen (61 ft. high and 124 ft. wide).

On March 21, 2023, a new "PhanaVision" was unveiled. Made by Daktronics, the 4K HDR video board is 77% larger, measuring 152 by 86 feet.

== Accolades ==
The food at Citizens Bank Park was named the Best Ballpark Food in a survey of Food Network viewers in the first annual Food Network Awards, which first aired on the network on April 22, 2007.

In 2007, PETA rated Citizens Bank Park as America's most vegetarian-friendly ballpark; the stadium was given the same honor in five of the next seven years as well.

== Photo gallery ==
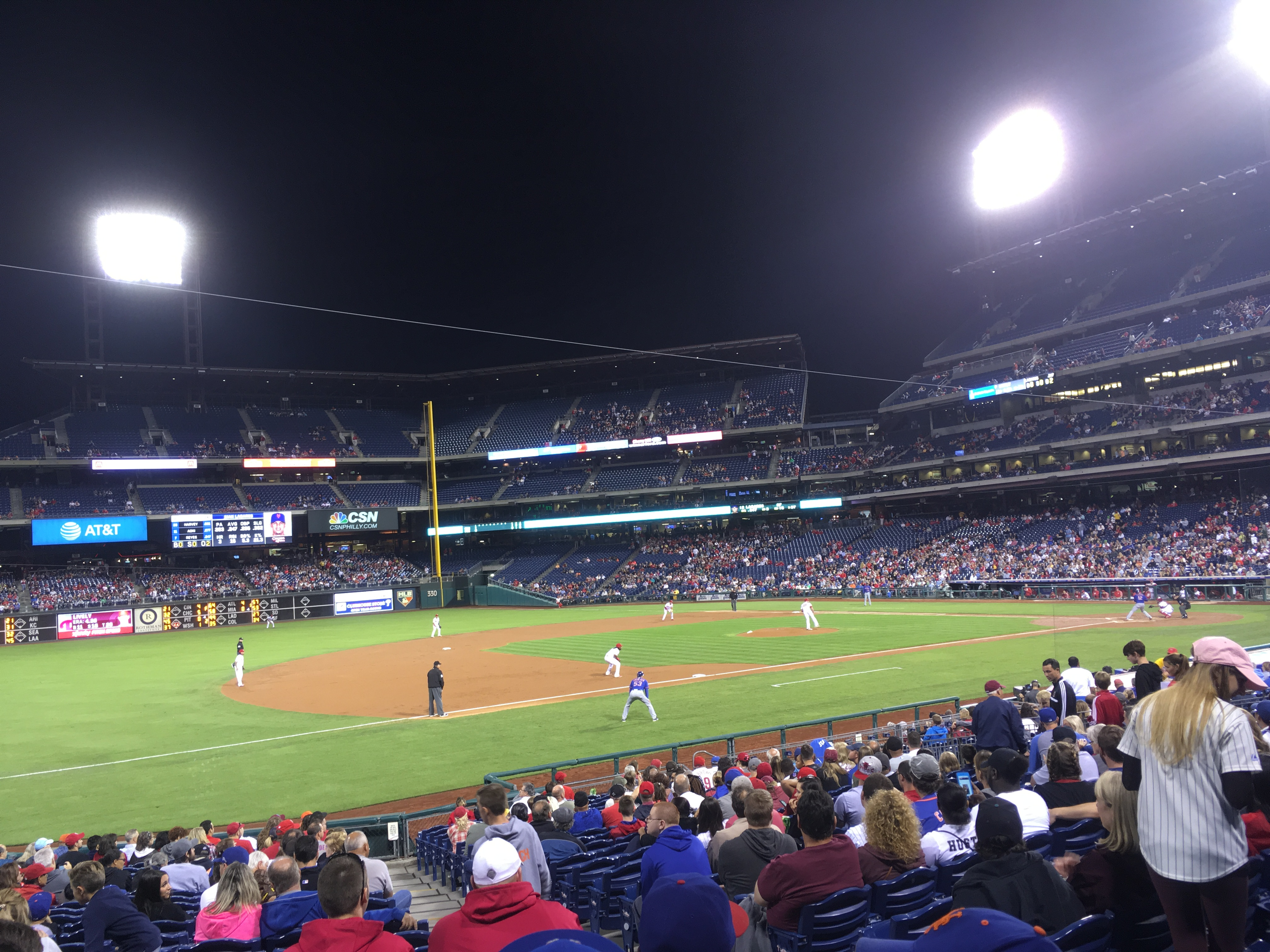
The Phillies take on the New York Mets at Citizens Bank Park on September 29, 2017.

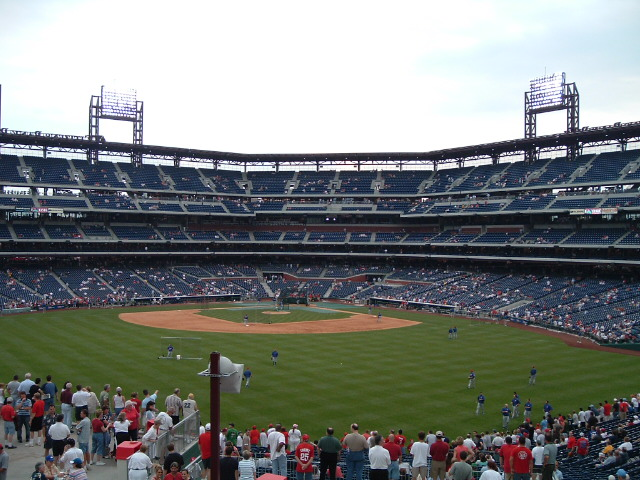
Outfield view from Ashburn Alley

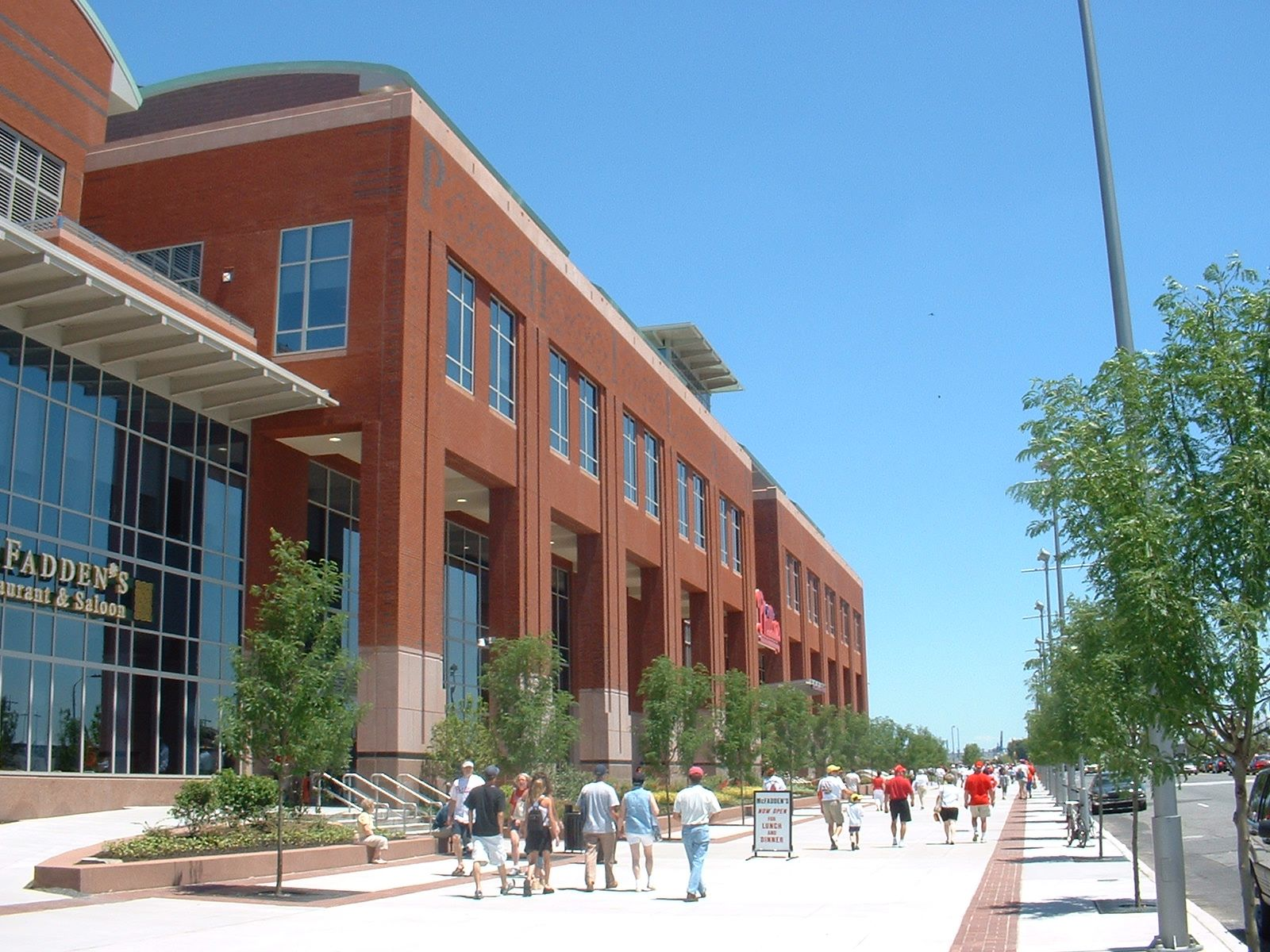
Home plate side of CBP on Pattison Avenue

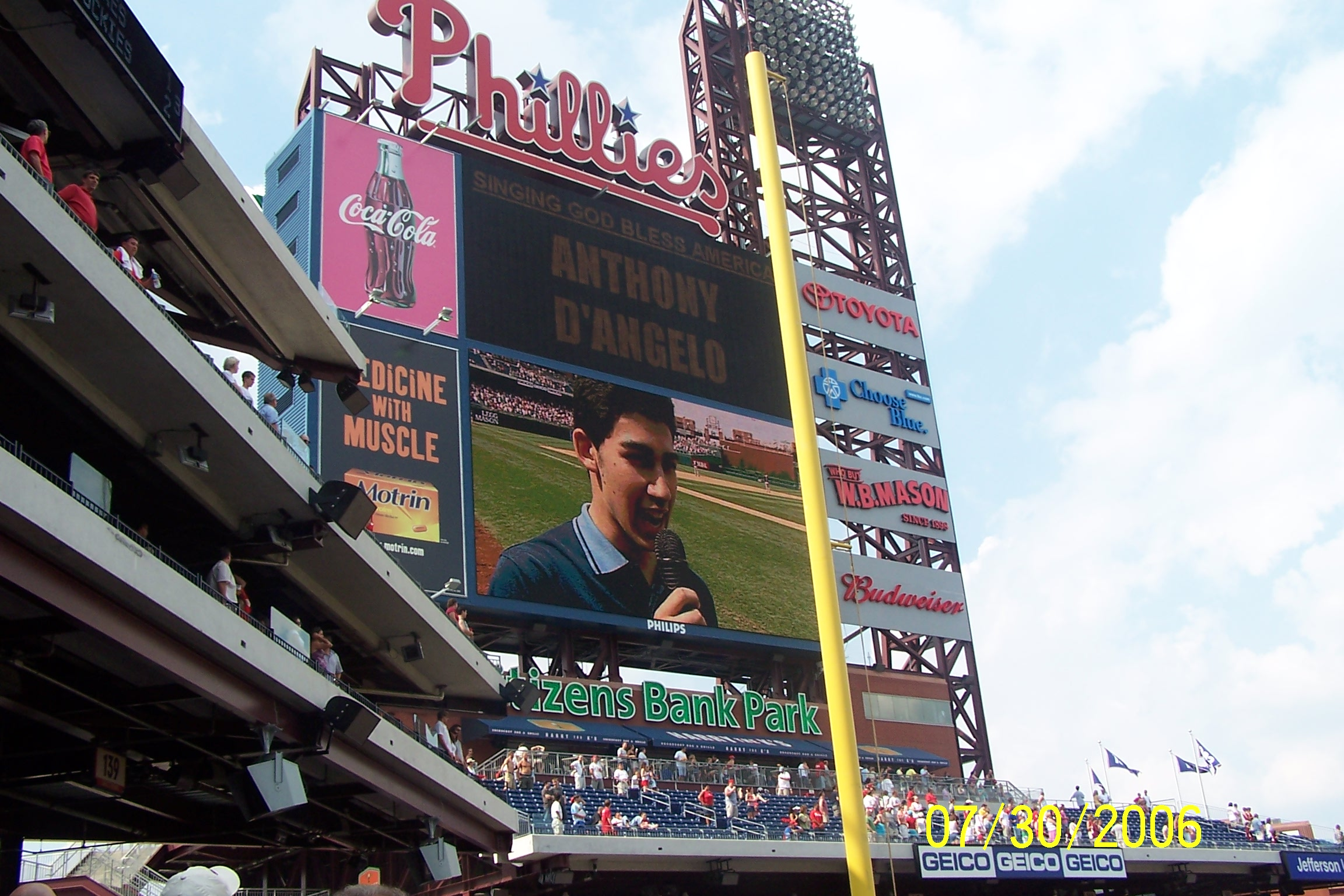
Scoreboard with singer

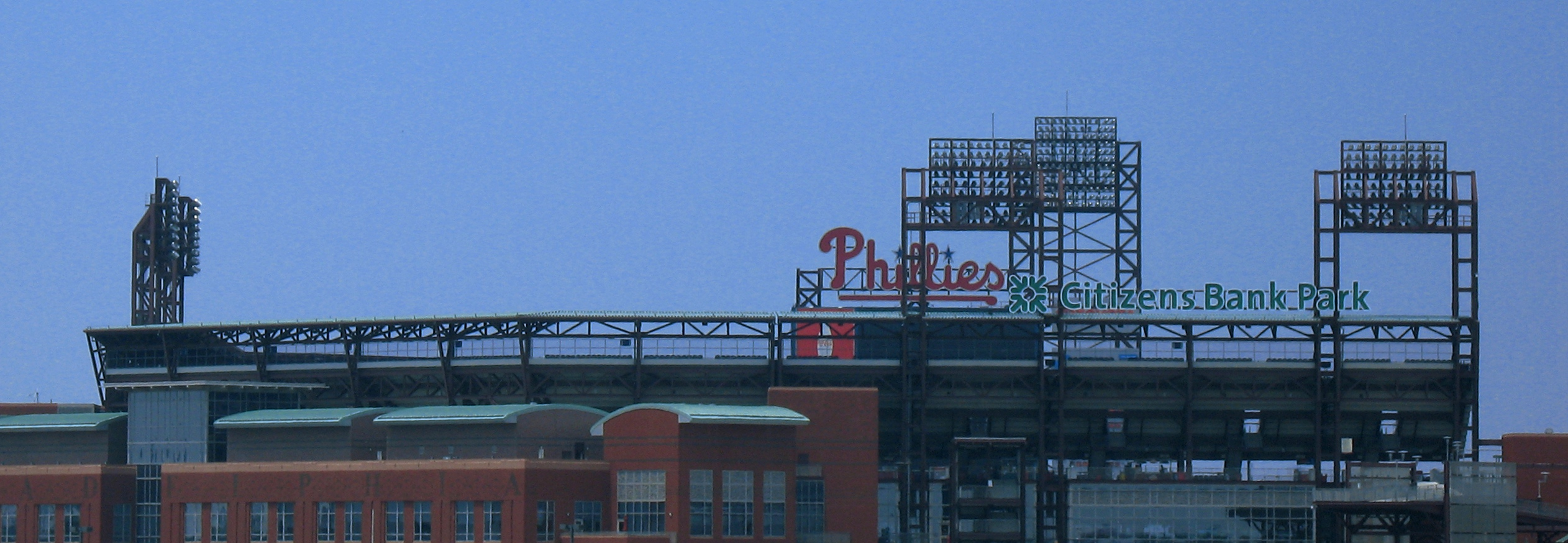
The view from I-95

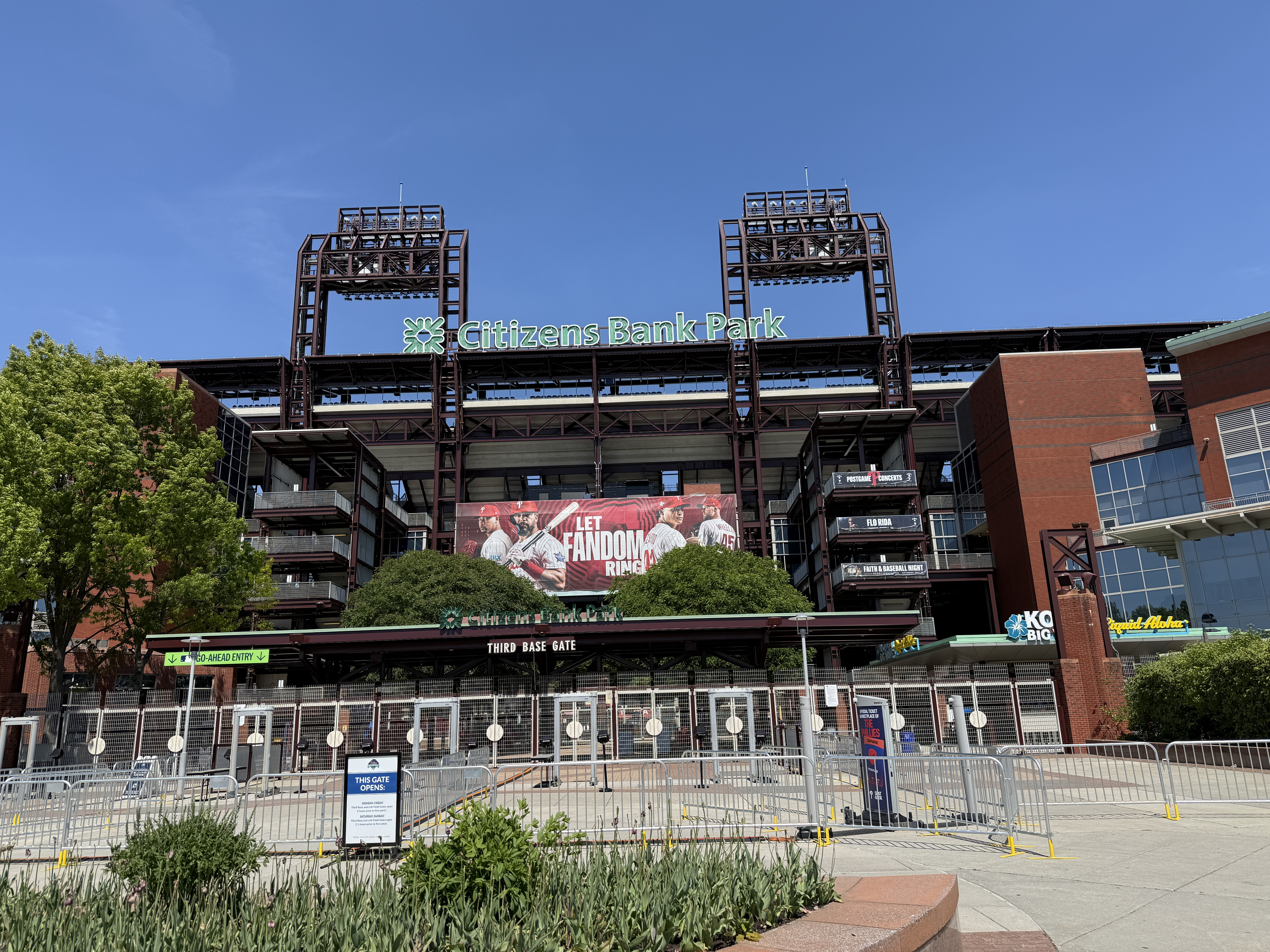
Entrance to the Ballpark

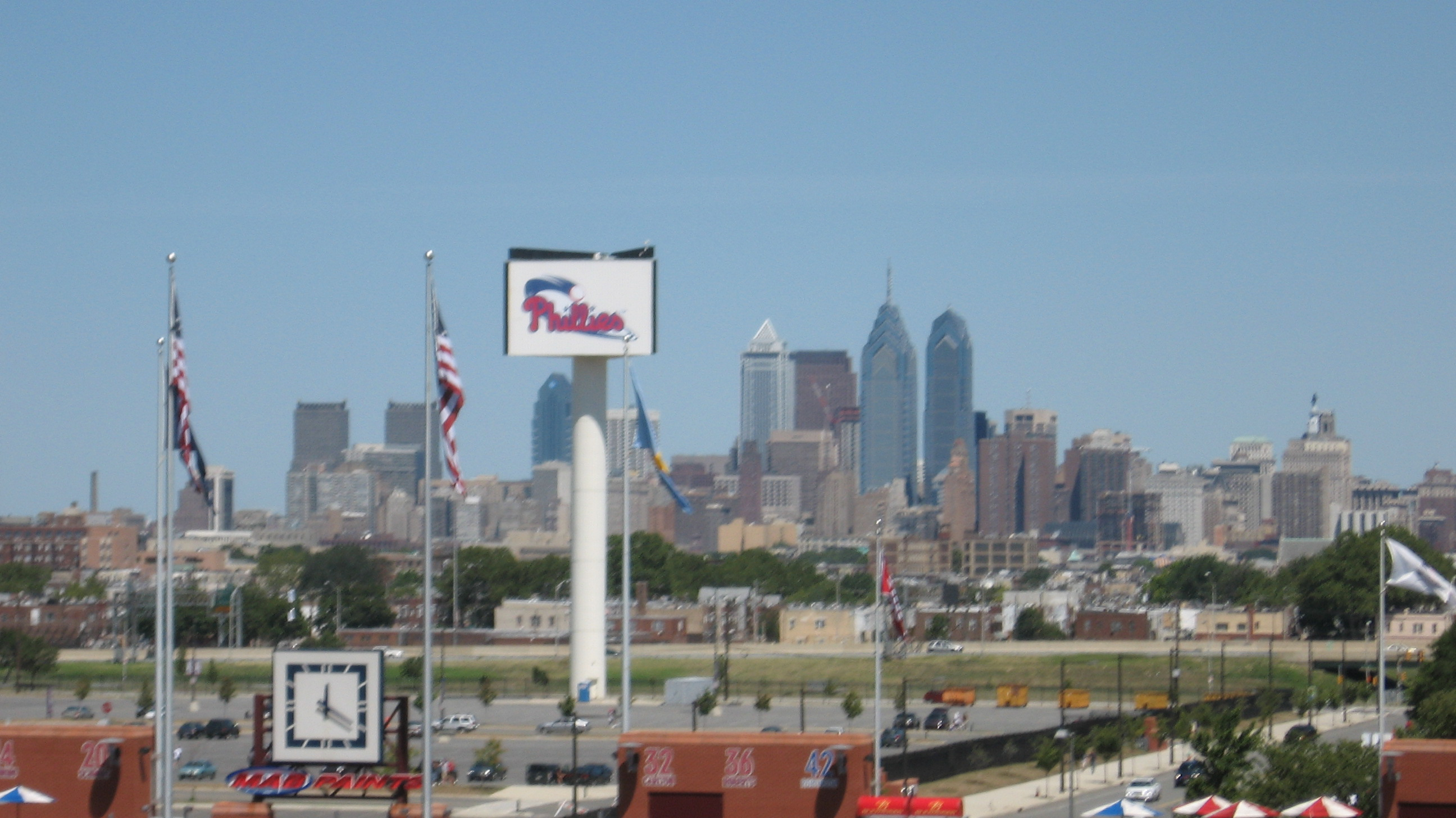
A view of the skyline from inside

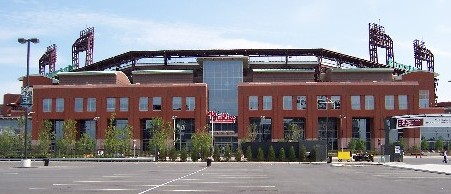
The front of the park as seen from a parking lot at Lincoln Financial Field

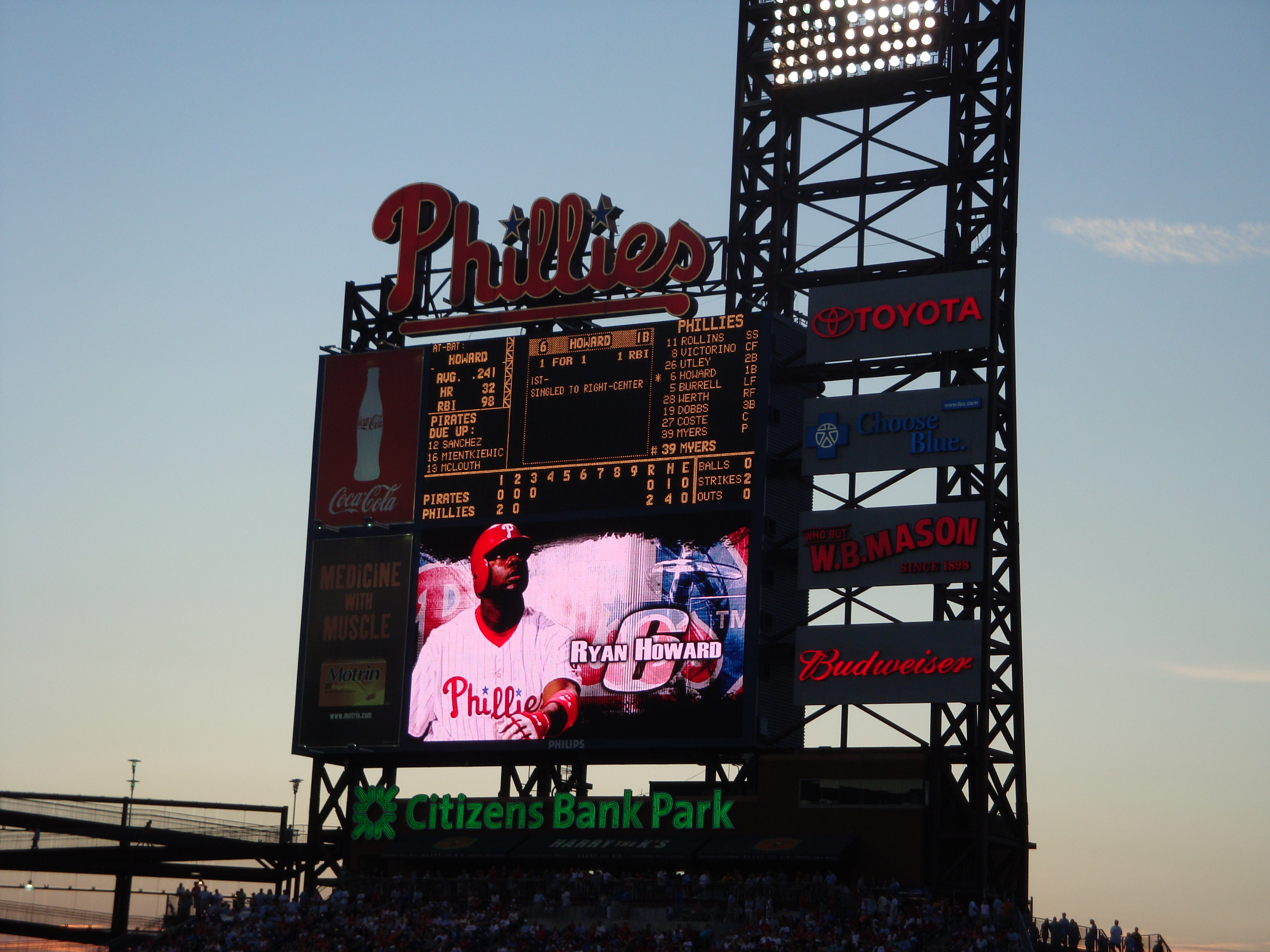
The scoreboard in left field as viewed from right field

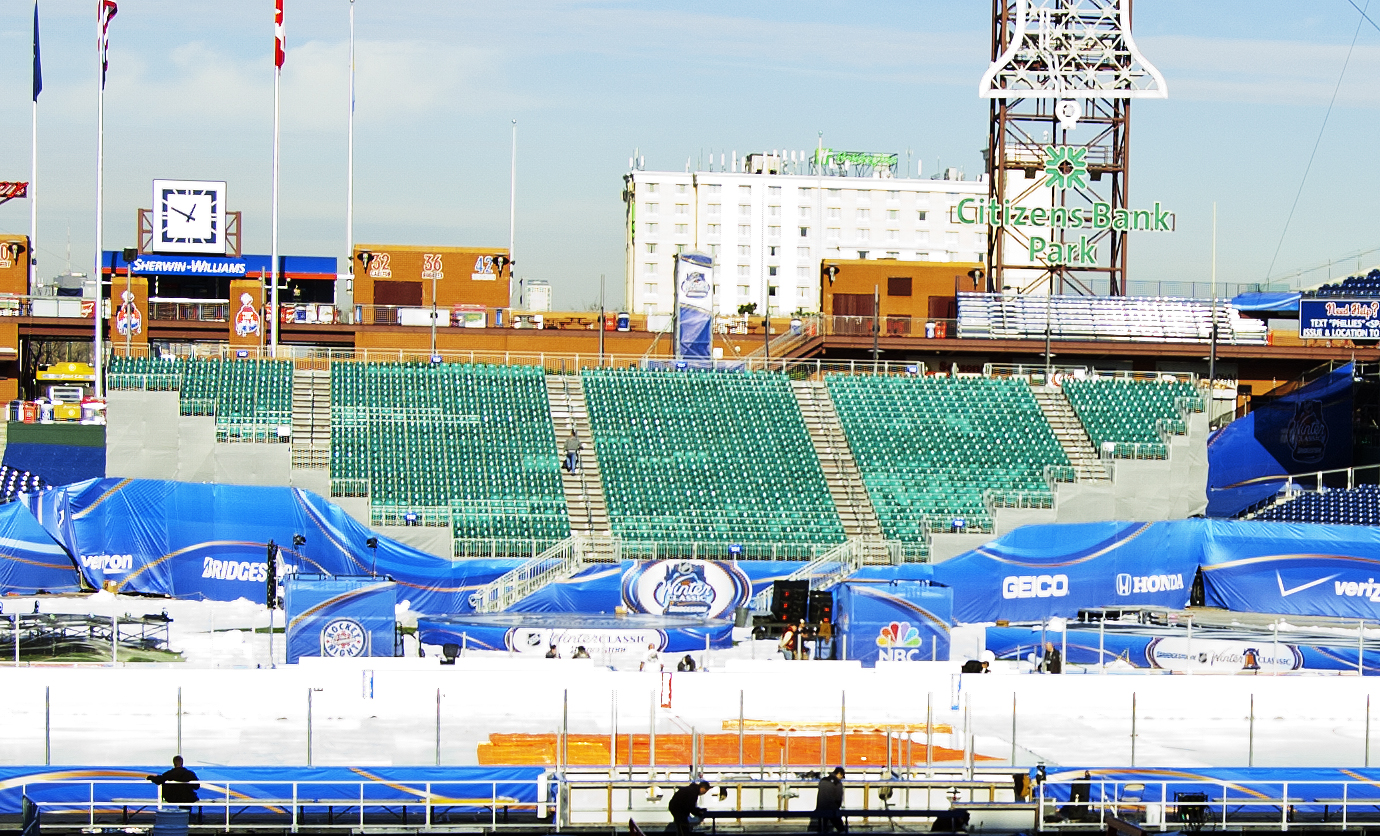
Temporary center field bleachers added for the 2012 NHL Winter Classic

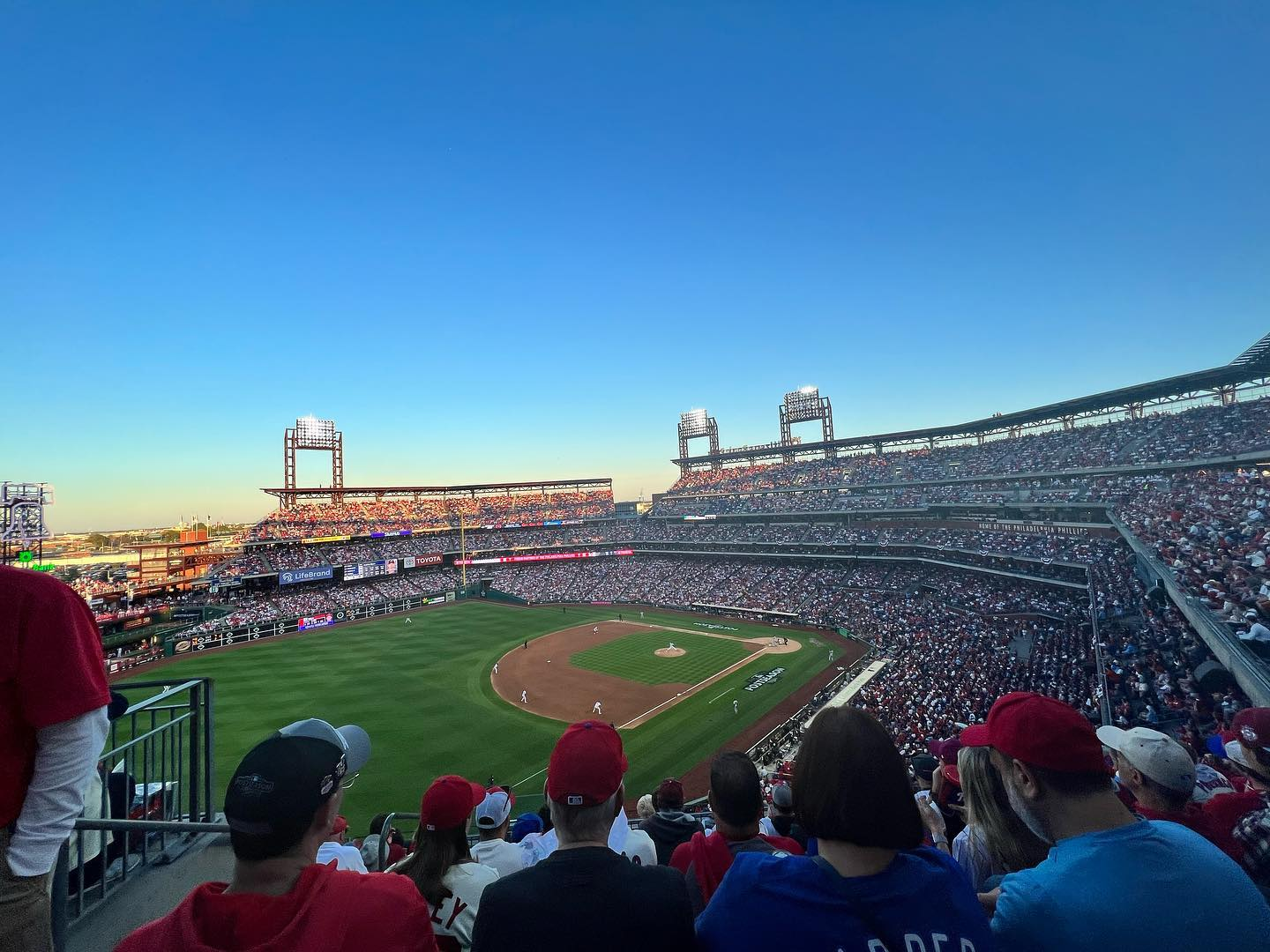
Citizens Bank Park hosting Game 3 of the 2022 NLDS

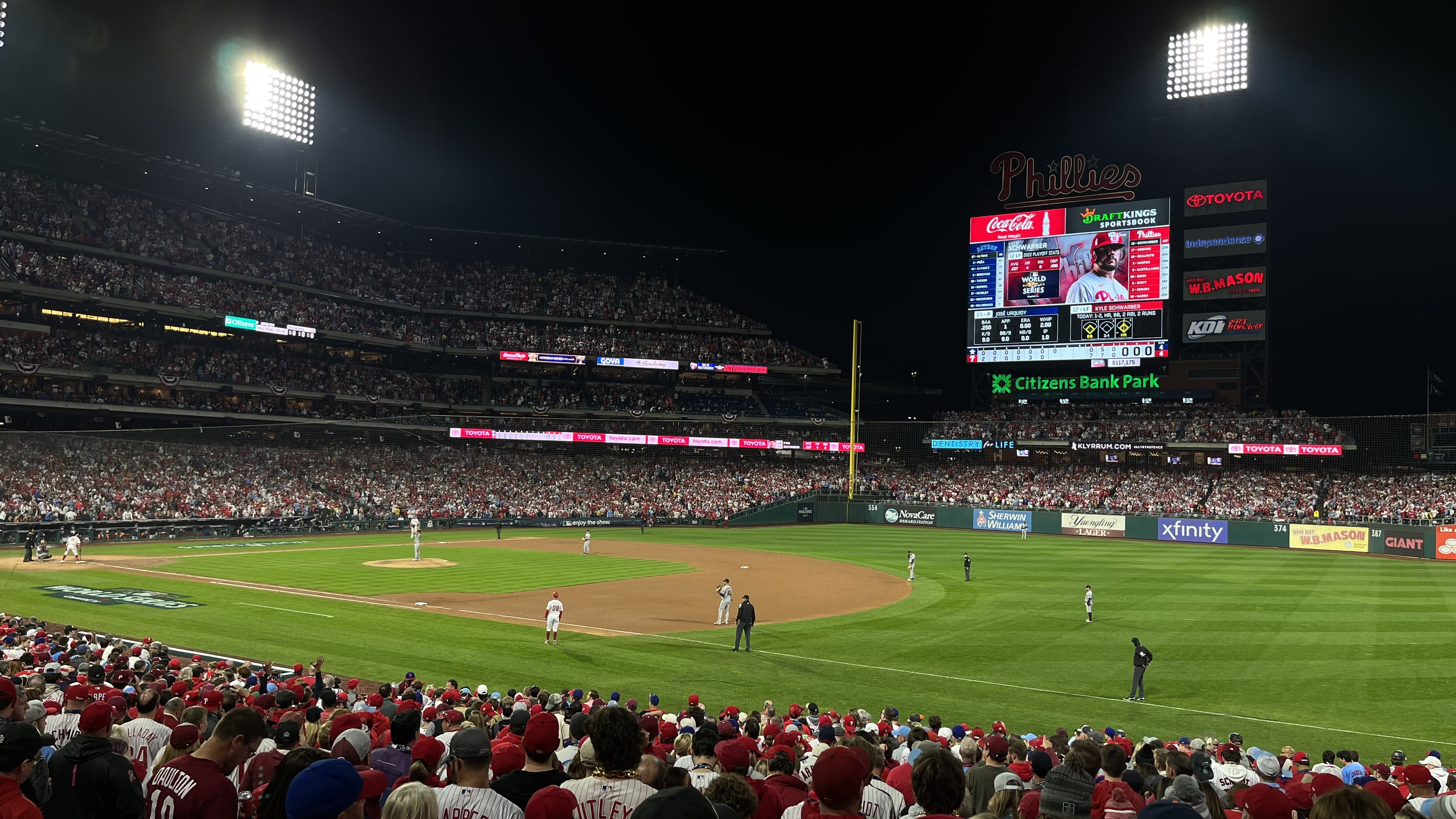
Citizens Bank Park hosting Game 3 of the 2022 World Series

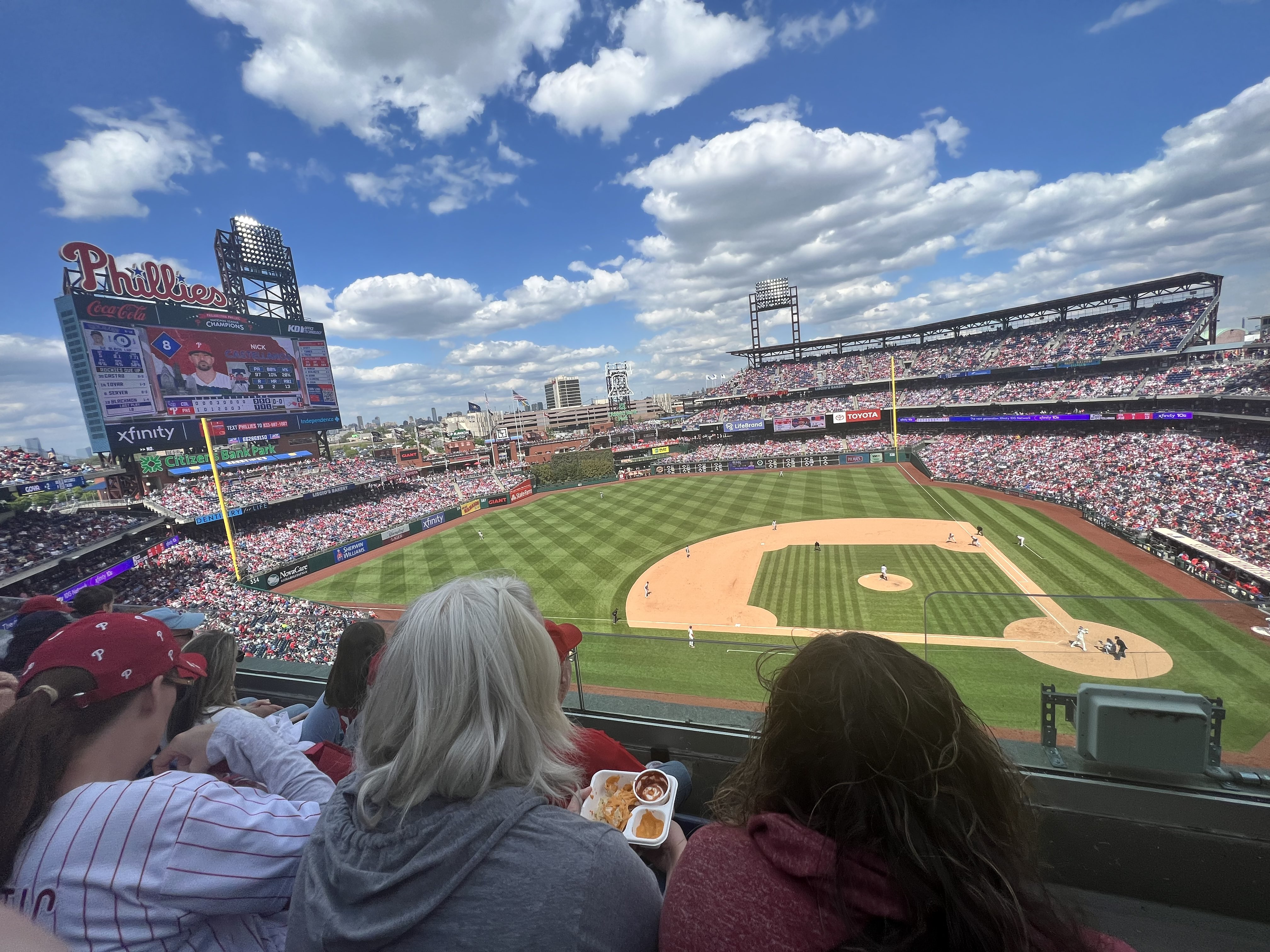
Citizens Bank Park during a 2023 regular season matchup against the Rockies

== See also ==
- List of Major League Baseball stadiums
- List of Major League Baseball spring-training stadiums
- Jefferson Street Grounds (Philadelphia) (site of first game in history of Major League Baseball)
- Lists of stadiums

Events and tenants
Preceded by Veterans Stadium	Home of the Philadelphia Phillies; 2004 – present	Succeeded by Current
Preceded by Heinz Field	Host of the NHL Winter Classic; 2012	Succeeded by Michigan Stadium
