= Paul Richardson (businessman) =

Paul Richardson, West Midlands businessman (born 1959)

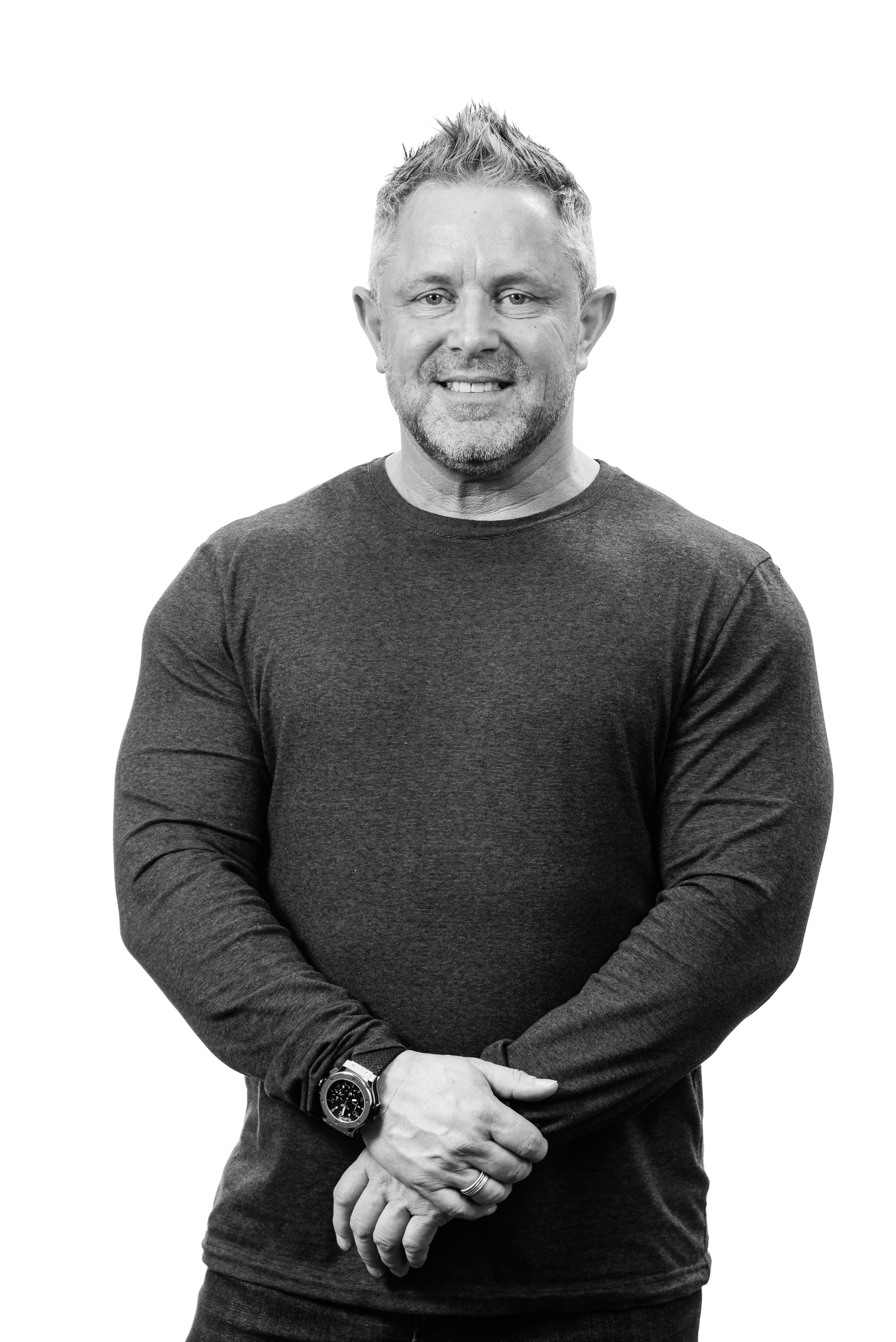
- An image of Richardson in 2018

Paul Richardson (born 31 May 1959) is a British businessman and entrepreneur. He is the former co-owner of AllSaints, and the former executive director and chairman of Gymshark. Richardson is currently executive chairman at streetwear brand HERA.

== Early life ==
Richardson ran various waste management services including, in 1992, founding City Waste. The company would go on to become the largest waste management and recycling company in the West Midlands with a turnover in excess of £10 million. City Waste was sold to SITA in 2002 for an eight figure sum. Richardson later purchased Wardon based chemical firm Norchem.

== AllSaints ==
In 2000, Richardson co-bought fashion retailer AllSaints out of administration and joined the board as a director. When he sold his stake in the company in 2004, AllSaints had expanded to 10 stores across the UK.

== Gymshark ==
In 2013, Richardson met with Gymshark co-founders Ben Francis and Lewis Morgan who enlisted his help in growing their new fitness apparel business. Richardson later joined Gymshark as executive chairman in 2015 to assist with the company's growth and international expansion.

In 2020, Richardson and two other shareholders sold 21% of their Gymshark stake to General Atlantic for around £250 million

== Other ventures ==
In January 2014, Richardson became a director at Knowaste, a waste management company that he had worked with since 2008. In his time at Knowaste, Richardson worked with the company to bring absorbent hygiene products (AHP) recycling to the market with the development of the first commercial AHP recycling facilities in the UK. These included the UK's first ever nappy recycling facility.

In October 2021, Richardson returned to the fashion retail sector, acquiring streetwear brand HERA and becoming the company’s executive chairman in the process. Focusing on digital growth, Richardson aims to grow the company to £100 million turnover by 2027

In May 2022, Richardson became chairman of Belfast-based fashion retail start-up Haru. Haru was co-founded by Jacques Hill and Sam Lynas partnering with charity shops and fashion brands to sell second hand clothing online.

== Birmingham City Football ==
In February 2002, Richardson joined the board of his boyhood football club, Birmingham City Football Club, as non-executive director. He carried out this role until May 2004, acting as an advisor to the senior management team during the club’s first two seasons in the Premier League.

In July 2022, Richardson launched a takeover bid for Birmingham City alongside former footballer Maxi López, at a reported fee of £35 million . After months of negotiations, Richardson and Lopez confirmed their company Maxco Capital were unable to agree terms citing concern around an ongoing investigation into the club's then owners. However, at the time, Richardson said he would consider bidding again should the opportunity arise. Birmingham City have since been taken over by Knighthead Capital Management LLC which includes a partnership with former NFL quarterback and seven time Super Bowl champion Tom Brady.
