= Paul Richardson (politician) =

American politician (1916–2003)

Member of the Kentucky House of Representatives from the 73rd district
- In office January 1, 1976 – January 1, 1993
- Preceded by: Glenn White
- Succeeded by: Drew Graham

Personal details
- Born: December 23, 1916
- Died: September 14, 2003 (aged 86)
- Party: Democratic

Paul W. Richardson Sr. (December 23, 1916 – September 14, 2003) was an American politician from Kentucky who was a member of the Kentucky House of Representatives from 1976 to 1993. Richardson was first elected to the house in 1975, defeating incumbent representative Glenn White for renomination. He was defeated for renomination in 1992 by Drew Graham.

He died in September 2003 at age 86.
