= Paul Richardson (organist) =

American musician (1932–2006)

Paul Richardson (1932 – October 2, 2006) was the home field organist for the Philadelphia Phillies from 1970 to 2005.

In 1980 when the Phillies won the World Series, Richardson was awarded a World Series ring alongside the players.

Richardson also played organ for the New York Yankees (owned by his friend George Steinbrenner) from 1978 to 1983 when the Phillies were on the road.

He is credited with popularizing the use of the "Charge!" fanfare in sports games, and with being the first to play a theme song for each player as they stepped up to the plate.

Once a staple of Phillies games, Richardson's organ music was heard much less frequently from the mid-1990s on, as pre-recorded ("canned") music became more prevalent. When the team moved into Citizens Bank Park in 2004, Richardson was not given a booth, and was seen only before games on the Ashburn Alley outfield concourse. A recording of his version of Take Me Out to the Ballgame was used for the seventh-inning stretch. This diminished role combined with health problems and no longer having a place where he could see the game were factors in Richardson announcing his retirement prior to the 2006 season.

On October 2, 2006, Richardson died after a long battle with prostate cancer . The Phillies paid tribute to him prior to their 2007 home opener and also during the seventh-inning stretch of that game.
