= Paul Richardson (recorder maker) =

Paul Richardson (born 2 March 1947) is a recorder maker living in Madrid, Spain, who makes hand-crafted copies of authentic original renaissance and baroque instruments.

== Beginnings ==
He began his formal musical training in Madrid (Spain) with Regino Sainz de la Maza (Romantic and Classical Guitar) in 1973 and in the following year began studying recorder in the Madrid Royal Conservatory.

In 1979, after finishing his studies in the Madrid Conservatory he founded the Aulos Quartet which has performed throughout North America and Europe.

== Current occupation ==
The experience of having played in this quartet during the following 8 years gave him the possibility to orient his recorder making craftsmanship towards the real needs of recorder players. Therefore, in 1987, after having found the solutions to some of the most important aspects of recorder making under the auspicious guidance of Alec Loretto, he set up his workshop.

== See also ==
- Silvestro Ganassi
