= Operation Boptrot =

FBI investigation of corruption in the legislature of Kentucky

- Date: 1992–1995
- Location: Kentucky
- Motive: Financial gain
- Participants: Members of the Frankfort lobbying corp Various members of the Kentucky General Assembly; Bruce Wilkinson, son of governor Wallace Wilkinson
- Convictions: Bribery; Campaign finance violations Conspiracy; Extortion; Mail fraud Making false statements Racketeering
- Investigative agency: Federal Bureau of Investigation (FBI)

Operation Boptrot, also referred to as Boptrot, was an investigation by the United States Federal Bureau of Investigation (FBI) into corruption among the Kentucky General Assembly, the Commonwealth's legislature. The operation was highly successful, with the investigation culminating in several indictments in 1992, leading to the conviction of more than a dozen legislators between 1992 and 1995. The investigation also led to reform legislation being passed in 1993.

== Operation ==
The sting, dubbed Operation Boptrot, involved legislators who accepted bribes and other illegal inducements to support horse-racing legislation in Kentucky. The FBI's original targets were the Business, Organization, and Professions Committees (the "BOP" in Boptrot) in the Kentucky House of Representatives and the Kentucky Senate. Those two committees oversaw state laws regulating horse racing (the "trot"). The exposé was especially notable for revealing how cheaply the legislators were willing to sell their votes.

== Convictions ==
Legislators convicted as a result of Operation Boptrot included:

1. Senator John Hall (D) pleaded guilty to conspiracy and other charges.
2. Representative Clay Crupper (D) pleaded guilty to charges of interstate travel in aid of racketeering and resigned. He was fined $10,000 in 1992.
3. Representative Ronny Layman (R) was indicted in 1992 on charges of conspiracy to commit extortion and making false statements to the FBI. He pleaded guilty and was sentenced to three months of home detention and community service.
4. Representative Jerry Bronger (D) was indicted in 1992 and later pleaded guilty to charges that he accepted $2,000 in exchange for blocking legislation that would hurt harness racing. He was sentenced to 10 months in prison.
5. Senator Helen Garrett (D) was charged in 1992 with taking a $2,000 bribe from a track in exchange for helping pass legislation. She pleaded guilty and received four years' probation.
6. Representative Tom O'Dell Smith (R) was convicted in Operation Crabgrass, an offshoot of BOPTROT.
7. House Speaker Don Blandford (D) was convicted after a trial on charges of extortion, racketeering and lying. He was sentenced to 64 months in prison and was fined $10,000.
8. Senator David LeMaster (D) was indicted in 1993, and acquitted of extortion and racketeering, but convicted of lying. He was sentenced to a year in prison and fined $30,000, but served just one day after resigning from the legislature.
9. Representative Richard Turner (R) pleaded guilty to a 1993 charge that he filed a false campaign finance report.
10. Senator Art Schmidt (R) pleaded guilty to a 1993 indictment for withholding the fact that he took a cash payment from another senator tied to Operation BopTrot. He was sentenced to probation and fined $2,500.
11. Senator Virgil Pearman (D) pleaded guilty after 1993 indictment charging that he took an illegal $3,000 campaign contribution. He was sentenced to three months in a halfway house, probation and was fined $5,000.
12. Representative Bill Strong (R) pleaded guilty after 1993 indictment charges that he took an illegal $3,000 campaign contribution and did not deposit the money into his campaign fund. He was sentenced to three months in a halfway house, probation and was fined $3,000.
13. Senator Patti Weaver (D) pleaded guilty after 1993 indictment charging that she was promised help finding a job in exchange for support of legislation. She was sentenced to weekend incarceration, probation and community service and was fined $10,000.
14. Senator Landon Sexton (R) pleaded guilty after 1994 indictment charging that he took an illegal $5,000 cash campaign contribution. He was sentenced to 15 consecutive weekends in jail, home detention for two months and probation for two years. In addition he was fined $5,000.
15. Senator John D. Rogers (R), then the Minority Leader in the Kentucky Senate, was sentenced in 1994 to 42 months in prison after conviction on charges of extortion, conspiracy, attempted extortion, mail fraud and lying to the FBI.

Others convicted as a result of Operation Boptrot included:

1. Lobbyist John W. "Jay" Spurrier, the "dean of the Frankfort lobbyist corps"
2. Former representative Bill McBee (D) of Boone County, was sentenced to a 15-month prison term for bribery and corruption.
3. Bruce Wilkinson, the nephew of then-Governor Wallace Wilkinson (D), who was serving as the governor's appointments secretary, was convicted of conspiracy to commit extortion and sentenced to three years' imprisonment and fined of $20,000, the amount of a bribe he was convicted of taking. Governor Wilkinson was investigated, but not charged.
4. Buel Guy (D) aide to Don Blandford and former legislator pled guilty to lying to the FBI.
5. Jockeys' Guild Inc.
6. George L. Atkins
7. Bradley Shannon
