= Schickel =

Schickel is a surname. Notable people with the surname include:

- Alfred Schickel (1933–2015), German historian
- Bill Schickel (born 1951), American politician
- J. William Schickel (1850–1907), German-American architect
- John Schickel (born 1954), American politician
- Richard Schickel (1933–2017), American film historian, journalist, author, documentarian, and film and literary critic
- William Schickel (artist) (1919–2009), American spiritual artist and liturgical architect

== See also ==
- Schickel & Ditmars, American architecture firm
