= Jeff Hoover =

American politician (born 1960)

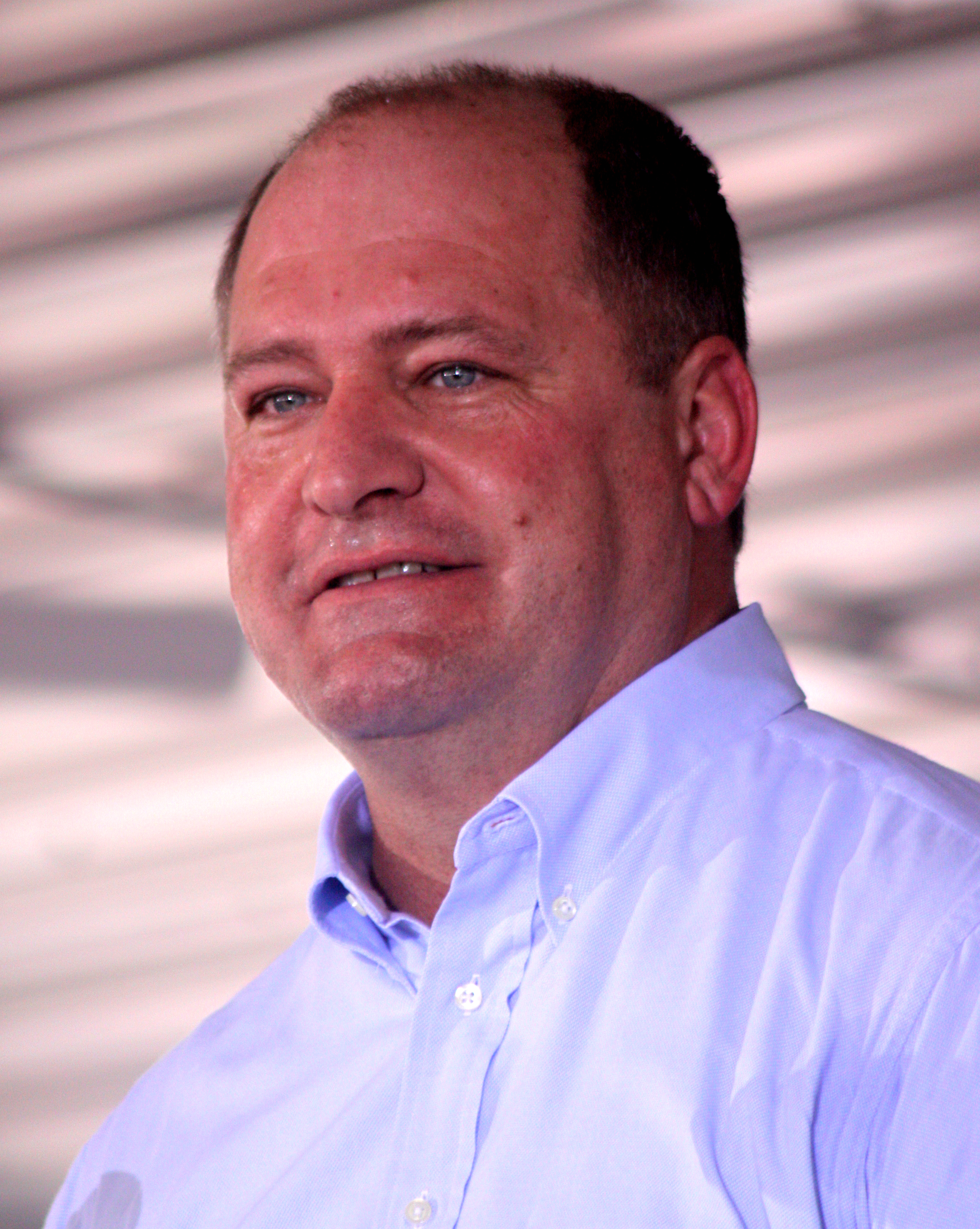
- Hoover in 2010

93rd Speaker of the Kentucky House of Representatives
- In office January 3, 2017 – January 8, 2018
- Preceded by: Greg Stumbo
- Succeeded by: David W. Osborne

Minority Leader of the Kentucky House of Representatives
- In office January 2, 2001 – January 3, 2017
- Preceded by: Danny Ford
- Succeeded by: Rocky Adkins

Member of the Kentucky House of Representatives from the 83rd district
- In office January 1, 1997 – January 1, 2021
- Preceded by: Tommy Todd
- Succeeded by: Josh Branscum

Personal details
- Born: Jeffrey H. Hoover; January 18, 1960 (age 66) Albany, Kentucky, U.S.
- Party: Republican
- Relations: Mae Hoover (mother)
- Education: Centre College (BA); Samford University (JD)

Jeffrey H. Hoover (born January 18, 1960) is an American politician and attorney who served as speaker of the Kentucky House of Representatives from 2017 to 2018, and was the first Republican to be elected speaker since 1920.

Elected to the House in 1996, Hoover served as minority caucus chair from 1999 to 2001, and minority leader from 2001 until his election as speaker in 2017. He represented Kentucky's 83rd House district, which comprised Clinton, Cumberland and Russell County as well as part of Pulaski County.

Hoover announced in late 2017 that he would resign as speaker due to accusations that he had sexually harassed an aide, which he denied. He was unopposed for re-election to his House seat in 2018 and did not seek reelection in 2020.

== Early life and education ==
Jeffrey H. Hoover was born on January 18, 1960, at War Memorial Hospital in Albany, Kentucky, to Welby and Mae (Turner) Hoover. In 1966, his parents started WJRS, the first FM radio station in Russell County, which Hoover continues to operate today.

Hoover's father was later a field representative for congressman Hal Rogers, and was elected to the Kentucky House of Representatives in 1986. However, his father died of a heart attack before he assumed office. A memorial service was held for his father by speaker Don Blandford in the House chamber; it was the first time Hoover had visited the state capitol. In the following special election, Hoover's mother was elected to serve her husband's term. She assumed office on February 6, 1987, and did not seek reelection in 1988.

Hoover was raised in Jamestown, and graduated from Russell County High School. Standing at six feet and four inches tall, he played basketball in high school as well as for Centre College, where he graduated in 1982 with a Bachelor of Arts degree in government. Afterwards, he served as an intern to Kentucky House minority leader Richard Turner before enrolling at Samford University's Cumberland School of Law. He graduated with a Juris Doctor degree in 1987.

Returning to Jamestown, Hoover clerked for a local circuit judge for eighteen months before entering into private practice and specializing in criminal litigation. After his mother's death in 2008, he bought out his siblings' interests in WJRS and assumed ownership of the station.

== Political career ==
Hoover was elected to the Kentucky House of Representatives in 1996, defeating incumbent Republican Tommy Todd for renomination. He was selected to serve as minority caucus chair in 1999, a position he held until his selection as minority leader in 2001.

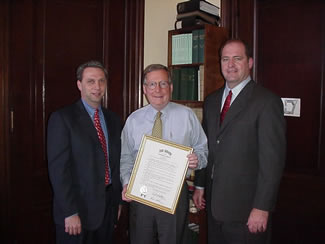
Hoover with Mitch McConnell and Richie Sanders on May 9, 2001

In 2007, Hoover unsuccessfully ran for lieutenant governor as the running mate of former congresswoman Anne Northup; their slate received 36.5% of the vote in the Republican primary against incumbent governor Ernie Fletcher.

In 2015, Hoover became the longest serving Republican leader in the history of the Kentucky House.

=== Speaker tenure ===
After the 2016 elections when Republicans gained a supermajority in the House, Hoover was selected as House Speaker replacing Democrat Greg Stumbo, becoming the first Republican speaker since the election of Joseph Bosworth in 1920.

==== Resignation ====
On November 4, 2017, governor Matt Bevin and eight House Republicans called on Hoover to resign after it was revealed that Hoover as well as House members Jim DeCesare, Brian Linder, and Michael Meredith had paid $110,000 to settle a sexual harassment claim made by a legislative staffer. The next day, Hoover announced his intent to resign as speaker. He was succeeded by speaker pro tempore David W. Osborne. Bevin said he was not satisfied with Hoover merely stepping down from his leadership position, and called on Hoover and others accused in the scandal to resign their seats.

On January 8, 2018, Hoover resigned as speaker. He did not seek reelection in 2020, and retired at the end of his term in January 2021.

== Personal life ==
In January 1992, Hoover married Karyn Blankenship. The two have three daughters together.

Hoover lives in Jamestown, where he continues to operate a private law practice. He also continues to manage WJRS, for which the Hoover family became the first group to be inducted into the Kentucky Broadcasters Mic Hall of Fame in 2025.
