= William Schickel =

William Schickel may refer to:

- J. William Schickel (1850–1907), German-American architect
- William Schickel (artist) (1919–2009), American spiritual artist and liturgical architect
- Bill Schickel (born 1951), American politician and broadcast executive
