= Senator Weaver =

Senator Weaver may refer to:

- Chuck Weaver (born 1956), Illinois State Senate
- Darrell Weaver (born 1962), Oklahoma State Senate
- John Weaver (Kentucky politician) (1946–1989), Kentucky State Senate
- Patti Weaver (born 1950), Kentucky State Senate
- Richard Weaver (American politician) (1827–1906), Wisconsin State Senate
- Stanley B. Weaver (1925–2003), Illinois State Senate
- Zebulon Weaver (1872–1948), North Carolina State Senate
