= Dick Roeding =

American politician

President pro tempore of the Kentucky Senate
- In office January 4, 2000 – January 4, 2005
- Preceded by: Joey Pendleton
- Succeeded by: Katie Kratz Stine

Minority Whip of the Kentucky Senate
- In office January 3, 1995 – January 7, 1997
- Preceded by: Charlie Borders
- Succeeded by: Elizabeth Tori

Member of the Kentucky Senate
- In office January 1, 1991 – January 1, 2009
- Preceded by: Patti Weaver
- Succeeded by: John Schickel
- Constituency: 24th district (1991–1993); 11th district (1993–2009)

Personal details
- Born: November 28, 1930 Covington, Kentucky, United States
- Died: October 6, 2017 (aged 86) Edgewood, Kentucky, United States
- Party: Republican

Richard L. Roeding (November 28, 1930 – October 6, 2017) was an American politician.

Roeding was born in Covington, Kentucky. He served in the United States Army during World War II. Roeding went to Xavier University and the University of Cincinnati and was a pharmacist. He was a member of the Kentucky State Senate from 1991 to 2009. He was a member of the Republican party.

Kentucky Senate
Preceded by Patti Weaver	Member of the Kentucky Senate from the 24th district 1991–1993	Succeeded by Gex Williams
Preceded by Art Schmidt	Member of the Kentucky Senate from the 11th district 1993–2009	Succeeded by John Schickel
