= Clyde Middleton =

American politician (1928–2019)

Judge/Executive of Kenton County
- In office January 1, 1990 – January 4, 1999
- Preceded by: Robert Aldemeyer
- Succeeded by: Richard Murgatroyd

Member of the Kentucky Senate from the 24th district
- In office November 1967 – January 1, 1987
- Preceded by: John J. Moloney
- Succeeded by: John Weaver

Personal details
- Born: January 30, 1928 Cleveland, Ohio, United States
- Died: July 12, 2019 (aged 91) Covington, Kentucky, United States
- Party: Republican

Clyde Middleton (January 30, 1928 - July 12, 2019) was an American politician in the state of Kentucky. He served in the Kentucky Senate as a Republican from 1967 to 1987. On June 15, 1972, Middleton was one of 11 Republican senators that voted against Kentucky's ratification of the Equal Rights Amendment.
