= Kentucky's 19th House of Representatives district =

American legislative district

Kentucky's 19th State House of Representatives district
Representative
Michael Meredith; R–Oakland
since January 1, 2011
- Registration: 53.9% Republican; 35.6% Democratic; 9.8% No party preference
- Demographics: 82.2% White; 9.1% Black; 3.5% Hispanic; 1.1% Asian; 0.1% Native American; 0.1% Hawaiian/Pacific Islander; 0.1% Other; 3.9% Multiracial
- Population (2023): 46,382
- Registered voters (2025): 36,846

Kentucky's 19th House of Representatives district is one of 100 districts in the Kentucky House of Representatives. Located in the western part of the state, it comprises the counties of Edmonson and part of Warren. It has been represented by Michael Meredith (R–Oakland) since 2011. As of 2023, the district had a population of 46,382.

== Voter registration ==
On January 1, 2025, the district had 36,846 registered voters, who were registered with the following parties.

Party	Registration	
Party	Voters	%
Republican	19,866	53.92
Democratic	13,104	35.56
Independent	1,752	4.75
Libertarian	192	0.52
Green	30	0.08
Constitution	25	0.07
Socialist Workers	8	0.02
Reform	5	0.01
"Other"	1,864	5.06
Total	36,846	100.00
Source: Kentucky State Board of Elections

== List of members representing the district ==
Member	Party	Years	Electoral history	District location
Ronny Layman (Leitchfield)	Republican	January 1, 1978 – January 1, 1991	Elected in 1977. Reelected in 1979. Reelected in 1981. Reelected in 1984. Reelected in 1986. Reelected in 1988. Retired.	1974–1985; Breckinridge (part), Butler (part), Edmonson, Grayson, and Hart (part) Counties.
Ronny Layman (Leitchfield)	Republican	January 1, 1978 – January 1, 1991	Elected in 1977. Reelected in 1979. Reelected in 1981. Reelected in 1984. Reelected in 1986. Reelected in 1988. Retired.	1985–1993; Edmonson, Grayson, and Hardin (part) Counties.
Richie Sanders (Smiths Grove)	Republican	January 1, 1991 – June 1996	Elected in 1990. Reelected in 1992. Reelected in 1994. Resigned after being elected to the Kentucky Senate.	1985–1993; Edmonson, Grayson, and Hardin (part) Counties.
Richie Sanders (Smiths Grove)	Republican	January 1, 1991 – June 1996	Elected in 1990. Reelected in 1992. Reelected in 1994. Resigned after being elected to the Kentucky Senate.	1993–1997; Edmonson, Grayson (part), Hardin (part), and Warren (part) Counties.
Anthony Mello (Mammoth Cave)	Republican	November 1996 – January 1, 1997	Elected to finish Sanders's term while simultaneously losing reelection to a full term.	1993–1997; Edmonson, Grayson (part), Hardin (part), and Warren (part) Counties.
Dottie Sims (Horse Cave)	Democratic	January 1, 1997 – January 1, 2005	Elected in 1996. Reelected in 1998. Reelected in 2000. Reelected in 2002. Lost reelection.	1997–2003
Dottie Sims (Horse Cave)	Democratic	January 1, 1997 – January 1, 2005	Elected in 1996. Reelected in 1998. Reelected in 2000. Reelected in 2002. Lost reelection.	2003–2015
Terry Shelton (Magnolia)	Republican	January 1, 2005 – January 1, 2007	Elected in 2004. Lost reelection.	2003–2015
Dottie Sims (Horse Cave)	Democratic	January 1, 2007 – January 1, 2011	Elected in 2006. Reelected in 2008. Lost reelection.	2003–2015
Michael Meredith (Oakland)	Republican	January 1, 2011 – present	Elected in 2010. Reelected in 2012. Reelected in 2014. Reelected in 2016. Reelected in 2018. Reelected in 2020. Reelected in 2022. Reelected in 2024. Reelected in 2026.	2003–2015
Michael Meredith (Oakland)	Republican	January 1, 2011 – present	Elected in 2010. Reelected in 2012. Reelected in 2014. Reelected in 2016. Reelected in 2018. Reelected in 2020. Reelected in 2022. Reelected in 2024. Reelected in 2026.	2015–2023
Michael Meredith (Oakland)	Republican	January 1, 2011 – present	Elected in 2010. Reelected in 2012. Reelected in 2014. Reelected in 2016. Reelected in 2018. Reelected in 2020. Reelected in 2022. Reelected in 2024. Reelected in 2026.	2023–present
