= Jerry Rhoads =

American politician (born 1941)

Minority Whip of the Kentucky Senate
- In office January 6, 2009 – January 1, 2015
- Preceded by: Joey Pendleton
- Succeeded by: Julian Carroll

Member of the Kentucky Senate from the 6th district
- In office January 1, 2003 – January 1, 2015
- Preceded by: Dick Adams
- Succeeded by: C. B. Embry

Personal details
- Born: April 5, 1941 (age 85) Henderson, Kentucky, U.S.
- Party: Democratic
- Education: Murray State University (BA); University of Kentucky (JD)

Jerry P. Rhoads (born April 5, 1941) is an American politician from Kentucky who was a member of the Kentucky Senate from 2003 to 2015. Rhoads was first elected in 2002 following retirement of incumbent senator Dick Adams. He did not seek reelection in 2014 and was succeeded by Republican C. B. Embry.
