= Kentucky's 6th Senate district =

American legislative district

Kentucky's 6th State Senate district
Senator
| Lindsey Tichenor; R–Smithfield |
since January 1, 2023
- Registration: 48.3% Republican; 39.1% Democratic; 11.9% No party preference
- Demographics: 81.0% White; 7.0% Black; 5.0% Hispanic; 3.0% Asian; 0.1% Native American; 0.5% Other; 3.5% Multiracial
- Population (2023): 117,704
- Registered voters (2025): 101,725

Kentucky's 6th Senatorial district is one of 38 districts in the Kentucky Senate. It comprises Oldham and Trimble counties, as well as part of Jefferson County. It has been represented by Lindsey Tichenor (R–Smithfield) since 2023. As of 2022, the district had a population of 117,704.

== Voter registration ==
On January 1, 2025, the district had 101,725 registered voters, who were registered with the following parties.

| Party | Registration | |
| Party | Voters | % |
|---|---|---|
| Republican | 49,164 | 48.33 |
| Democratic | 39,774 | 39.10 |
| Independent | 6,236 | 6.13 |
| Libertarian | 536 | 0.53 |
| Green | 64 | 0.06 |
| Constitution | 35 | 0.03 |
| Socialist Workers | 17 | 0.02 |
| Reform | 5 | 0.00 |
| "Other" | 5,894 | 5.79 |
| Total | 101,725 | 100.00 |
Source: Kentucky State Board of Elections

== Election results from statewide races ==
=== 2014 – 2020 ===
| Year | Office | Results (Note: Figures presented in this table are calculated by summing precinct election results published by the Kentucky State Board of Elections, using precinct data that list each precinct's senatorial district.) |
|---|---|---|
| 2014 | Senator | McConnell 61.8 - 35.3% |
| 2015 | Governor | Bevin 57.7 - 39.4% |
| 2015 | Secretary of State | Knipper 52.2 - 47.8% |
| 2015 | Attorney General | Westerfield 51.3 - 48.7% |
| 2015 | Auditor of Public Accounts | Harmon 57.2 - 42.8% |
| 2015 | State Treasurer | Ball 58.9 - 41.1% |
| 2015 | Commissioner of Agriculture | Quarles 61.8 - 38.2% |
| 2016 | President | Trump 75.0 - 21.5% |
| 2016 | Senator | Paul 65.3 - 34.7% |
| 2019 | Governor | Bevin 57.5 - 40.2% |
| 2019 | Secretary of State | Adams 63.0 - 37.0% |
| 2019 | Attorney General | Cameron 67.0 - 33.0% |
| 2019 | Auditor of Public Accounts | Harmon 64.1 - 33.0% |
| 2019 | State Treasurer | Ball 67.4 - 32.6% |
| 2019 | Commissioner of Agriculture | Quarles 65.3 - 32.2% |
| 2020 | President | Trump 75.1 - 23.5% |
| 2020 | Senator | McConnell 67.3 - 27.0% |
| 2020 | Amendment 1 | Yes 58.5 - 41.5% |
| 2020 | Amendment 2 | No 65.3 - 34.7% |

=== 2022 – present ===
| Year | Office | Results |
|---|---|---|
| 2022 | Senator | Paul 55.0 - 44.9% |
| 2022 | Amendment 1 | No 57.3 - 42.7% |
| 2022 | Amendment 2 | No 62.2 - 37.8% |
| 2023 | Governor | Beshear 55.8 - 44.2% |
| 2023 | Secretary of State | Adams 57.3 - 42.6% |
| 2023 | Attorney General | Coleman 54.0 - 46.0% |
| 2023 | Auditor of Public Accounts | Ball 57.0 - 43.0% |
| 2023 | State Treasurer | Metcalf 53.7 - 46.3% |
| 2023 | Commissioner of Agriculture | Shell 55.2 - 44.8% |
| 2024 | President | Trump 54.9 - 43.1% |
| 2024 | Amendment 1 | Yes 62.8 - 37.2% |
| 2024 | Amendment 2 | No 62.4 - 37.6% |

== List of members representing the district ==
| Member | Party | Years | Electoral history | District location |
|---|---|---|---|---|
| William A. Logan (Madisonville) | Democratic | January 1, 1970 – March 1972 | Elected in 1969. Resigned to become a member of the Kentucky Public Service Commission. | 1964–1972 |
| William A. Logan (Madisonville) | Democratic | January 1, 1970 – March 1972 | Elected in 1969. Resigned to become a member of the Kentucky Public Service Commission. | 1972–1974 |
| Ken Gibson (Madisonville) | Democratic | June 8, 1972 – January 1, 1987 | Elected to finish Logan's term. Reelected in 1973. Reelected in 1977. Reelected in 1981. Retired. | 1972–1974 |
| Ken Gibson (Madisonville) | Democratic | June 8, 1972 – January 1, 1987 | Elected to finish Logan's term. Reelected in 1973. Reelected in 1977. Reelected in 1981. Retired. | 1974–1984 |
| Ken Gibson (Madisonville) | Democratic | June 8, 1972 – January 1, 1987 | Elected to finish Logan's term. Reelected in 1973. Reelected in 1977. Reelected in 1981. Retired. | 1984–1993; Caldwell, Hopkins, McLean, and Muhlenberg (part) Counties. |
| William T. Brinkley (Madisonville) | Democratic | January 1, 1987 – March 2, 1989 | Elected in 1986. Died. | 1984–1993; Caldwell, Hopkins, McLean, and Muhlenberg (part) Counties. |
| Kim L. Nelson (Madisonville) | Democratic | June 6, 1989 – January 1, 1999 | Elected to finish Brinkley's term. Reelected in 1990. Reelected in 1994. Lost renomination. | 1984–1993; Caldwell, Hopkins, McLean, and Muhlenberg (part) Counties. |
| Kim L. Nelson (Madisonville) | Democratic | June 6, 1989 – January 1, 1999 | Elected to finish Brinkley's term. Reelected in 1990. Reelected in 1994. Lost renomination. | 1993–1997 |
| Kim L. Nelson (Madisonville) | Democratic | June 6, 1989 – January 1, 1999 | Elected to finish Brinkley's term. Reelected in 1990. Reelected in 1994. Lost renomination. | 1997–2003 |
| Dick Adams (Madisonville) | Democratic | January 1, 1999 – January 1, 2003 | Elected in 1998. Retired. | 1997–2003 |
| Jerry Rhoads (Madisonville) | Democratic | January 1, 2003 – January 1, 2015 | Elected in 2002. Reelected in 2006. Reelected in 2010. Retired. | 2003–2015 |
| C. B. Embry (Morgantown) | Republican | January 1, 2015 – September 26, 2022 | Elected in 2014. Reelected in 2018. Resigned due to health issues. | 2015–2023 |
| Lindsey Tichenor (Smithfield) | Republican | January 1, 2023 – present | Elected in 2022. Lost reelection. | 2023–present |
| Christian Furman (Prospect) | Democratic | Assuming office January 1, 2027 | Elected in 2026. | 2023–present |
