= Willard Allen (politician) =

American politician (born 1940)

Woody Allen

Minority Leader of the Kentucky House of Representatives
- In office January 6, 1987 – January 3, 1989
- Preceded by: Richard Turner
- Succeeded by: William Strong

Member of the Kentucky House of Representatives from the 17th district
- In office January 1, 1974 – January 1, 2003
- Preceded by: Theron Kessinger
- Succeeded by: C. B. Embry

Personal details
- Born: April 21, 1940 (age 86) Garrard County, Kentucky, U.S.
- Party: Republican

Willard C. "Woody" Allen (born April 21, 1940) is an American politician in the state of Kentucky. He served in the Kentucky House of Representatives as a Republican from 1974 to 2003. He did not seek reelection in 2002.

Party political offices
Preceded by Leonard "Buck" Beasley	Republican nominee for Agriculture Commissioner of Kentucky; 1995	Vacant Title next held by Richie Farmer
