= Dottie Sims =

American politician

Member of the Kentucky House of Representatives from the 19th district
- In office January 1, 2007 – January 1, 2011
- Preceded by: Terry Shelton
- Succeeded by: Michael Meredith
- In office January 1, 1997 – January 1, 2005
- Preceded by: Anthony Mello
- Succeeded by: Terry Shelton

Personal details
- Born: April 6, 1949
- Died: October 9, 2023 (aged 74)
- Party: Democratic

Dorothy Jean Sims (April 6, 1949 – October 9, 2023) was an American politician from Kentucky who was a member of the Kentucky House of Representatives from 1997 to 2005 and again from 2007 to 2011. Sims was first elected in November 1996, defeating Republican Anthony Mello. Mello simultaneously won a special election to fill the seat for the remaining two months until January 1997. Sims was defeated for reelection in 2004 by Republican Terry Shelton. Sims challenged Shelton again in 2006, regaining her seat. She was defeated for reelection in 2010 by Republican Michael Meredith.

Sims died on October 9, 2023.
