= Kentucky's 11th Senate district =

American legislative district

Kentucky's 11th State Senate district
Senator
Steve Rawlings; R–Burlington
since January 1, 2025
- Registration: 54.7% Republican; 29.3% Democratic; 15.2% No party preference
- Demographics: 83.9% White; 3.7% Black; 5.6% Hispanic; 2.7% Asian; 0.1% Hawaiian/Pacific Islander; 0.5% Other; 3.5% Multiracial
- Population (2023): 115,599
- Registered voters (2025): 97,903

Kentucky's 11th Senatorial district is one of 38 districts in the Kentucky Senate. Located in the northern part of the state, it comprises part of Boone County. It has been represented by Steve Rawlings (R–Burlington) since 2025. As of 2023, the district had a population of 115,599.

From 1980 to 1984, the district was represented by Jim Bunning, who would later be elected U.S. representative and U.S. senator from Kentucky.

== Voter registration ==
On January 1, 2025, the district had 97,903 registered voters, who were registered with the following parties.

Party	Registration	
Party	Voters	%
Republican	53,579	54.73
Democratic	28,644	29.26
Independent	6,272	6.41
Libertarian	655	0.67
Green	84	0.09
Constitution	53	0.05
Socialist Workers	26	0.03
Reform	5	0.01
"Other"	8,585	8.77
Total	97,903	100.00
Source: Kentucky State Board of Elections

== Election results from statewide races ==
=== 2014 – 2020 ===
Year	Office	Results (Note: Figures presented in this table are calculated by summing precinct election results published by the Kentucky State Board of Elections, using precinct data that list each precinct's senatorial district.)
2014	Senator	McConnell 67.8 - 28.6%
2015	Governor	Bevin 65.8 - 30.8%
2015	Secretary of State	Knipper 66.5 - 33.5%
2015	Attorney General	Westerfield 61.6 - 38.4%
2015	Auditor of Public Accounts	Harmon 71.4 - 28.6%
2015	State Treasurer	Ball 74.1 - 25.9%
2015	Commissioner of Agriculture	Quarles 72.1 - 27.9%
2016	President	Trump 67.8 - 26.1%
2016	Senator	Paul 73.3 - 26.7%
2019	Governor	Bevin 56.2 - 41.4%
2019	Secretary of State	Adams 62.3 - 37.7%
2019	Attorney General	Cameron 67.7 - 32.3%
2019	Auditor of Public Accounts	Harmon 63.6 - 31.5%
2019	State Treasurer	Ball 69.2 - 30.8%
2019	Commissioner of Agriculture	Quarles 64.8 - 30.3%
2020	President	Trump 66.9 - 31.2%
2020	Senator	McConnell 62.3 - 33.5%
2020	Amendment 1	Yes 66.8 - 33.2%
2020	Amendment 2	No 70.4 - 29.6%

=== 2022 – present ===
Year	Office	Results
2022	Senator	Paul 66.8 - 33.1%
2022	Amendment 1	Yes 51.4 - 48.6%
2022	Amendment 2	No 50.1 - 49.9%
2023	Governor	Cameron 54.5 - 45.5%
2023	Secretary of State	Adams 64.6 - 35.2%
2023	Attorney General	Coleman 63.0 - 37.0%
2023	Auditor of Public Accounts	Ball 66.0 - 34.0%
2023	State Treasurer	Metcalf 64.3 - 35.7%
2023	Commissioner of Agriculture	Shell 64.6 - 35.4%
2024	President	Trump 66.4 - 31.8%
2024	Amendment 1	Yes 67.6 - 32.4%
2024	Amendment 2	No 61.2 - 38.8%

== List of members representing the district ==
Member	Party	Years	Electoral history	District location
Donald Johnson (Newport)	Republican	January 1, 1964 – November 17, 1977	Elected in 1963. Reelected in 1967. Reelected in 1971. Reelected in 1975. Lost reelection.	1964–1972
Donald Johnson (Newport)	Republican	January 1, 1964 – November 17, 1977	Elected in 1963. Reelected in 1967. Reelected in 1971. Reelected in 1975. Lost reelection.	1972–1974
Donald Johnson (Newport)	Republican	January 1, 1964 – November 17, 1977	Elected in 1963. Reelected in 1967. Reelected in 1971. Reelected in 1975. Lost reelection.	1974–1984
Donald Johnson (Newport)	Democratic	November 17, 1977 – January 1, 1980	Elected in 1963. Reelected in 1967. Reelected in 1971. Reelected in 1975. Lost reelection.	1974–1984
Jim Bunning (Fort Thomas)	Republican	January 1, 1980 – January 1, 1984	Elected in 1979. Retired to run for governor of Kentucky.	1974–1984
Art Schmidt (Cold Spring)	Republican	January 1, 1984 – January 1, 1993	Elected in 1983. Reelected in 1988. Retired.	1984–1993; Bracken, Campbell, and Pendleton (part) Counties.
Dick Roeding (Lakeside Park)	Republican	January 1, 1993 – January 1, 2009	Redistricted from the 24th district and reelected in 1992. Reelected in 1996. Reelected in 2000. Reelected in 2004. Retired.	1993–1997
Dick Roeding (Lakeside Park)	Republican	January 1, 1993 – January 1, 2009	Redistricted from the 24th district and reelected in 1992. Reelected in 1996. Reelected in 2000. Reelected in 2004. Retired.	1997–2003
Dick Roeding (Lakeside Park)	Republican	January 1, 1993 – January 1, 2009	Redistricted from the 24th district and reelected in 1992. Reelected in 1996. Reelected in 2000. Reelected in 2004. Retired.	2003–2015
John Schickel (Union)	Republican	January 1, 2009 – January 1, 2025	Elected in 2008. Reelected in 2012. Reelected in 2016. Reelected in 2020. Retired.	2003–2015
John Schickel (Union)	Republican	January 1, 2009 – January 1, 2025	Elected in 2008. Reelected in 2012. Reelected in 2016. Reelected in 2020. Retired.	2015–2023
John Schickel (Union)	Republican	January 1, 2009 – January 1, 2025	Elected in 2008. Reelected in 2012. Reelected in 2016. Reelected in 2020. Retired.	2023–present
Steve Rawlings (Burlington)	Republican	January 1, 2025 – present	Elected in 2024.	2023–present
