= Brian Linder =

American politician (born 1972)

Member of the Kentucky House of Representatives from the 61st district
- In office January 1, 2013 – January 1, 2019
- Preceded by: Royce Adams
- Succeeded by: Savannah Maddox

Personal details
- Born: January 24, 1972 (age 54)
- Party: Republican
- Education: University of Kentucky (BA); Thomas More College (MBA)

Brian E. Linder (born January 24, 1972) is an American politician and a former Republican member of the Kentucky House of Representatives, who represented District 61 from 2013 to 2019. He did not seek reelection in 2018.

== Early life ==
Linder earned his bachelor's degree in economics, history, and political science from the University of Kentucky and his MBA from Thomas More College.

== Career ==
2012 When District 61 Democratic Representative Royce Adams retired and left the seat open, Linder won the May 22, 2012 Republican Primary with 806 votes (52.9%) and won the November 6, 2012 General election with 9,387 votes (58.7%) against Democratic nominee Wanda Hammons.

== Sexual harassment accusations ==
In November 2017, the Courier-Journal published a story revealing that House Speaker Jeff Hoover had reached a confidential settlement for a sexual harassment suit made by a female staff member against four state representatives, including Linder. He later admitted to being involved in the settlement, and apologized for making unspecified "mistakes". He was subsequently replaced as the leader of the House Pension Committee, and did not seek reelection in 2018.
