= C. B. Embry =

American politician (1941–2022)

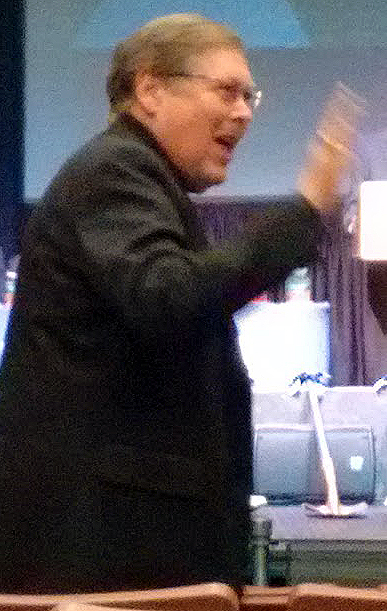
- Embry waving to a crowd in 2015

Member of the Kentucky Senate from the 6th district
- In office January 1, 2015 – September 26, 2022
- Preceded by: Jerry Rhoads
- Succeeded by: Lindsey Tichenor (redistricting)

Member of the Kentucky House of Representatives from the 17th district
- In office January 1, 2003 – January 1, 2015
- Preceded by: Willard Allen
- Succeeded by: Jim DeCesare

Personal details
- Born: July 29, 1941 Louisville, Kentucky, U.S.
- Died: September 29, 2022 (aged 81) Bowling Green, Kentucky, U.S.
- Party: Republican
- Education: Duke University; Kentucky Wesleyan College; University of Kentucky; University of Louisville; Western Kentucky University (B.S.) 1963

Carlos Brogdon Embry Jr. (July 29, 1941 – September 29, 2022) was an American politician and a Republican member of the Kentucky Senate representing District 6 from January 1, 2015, until September 26, 2022, when he resigned due to cancer. He previously served in the Kentucky House of Representatives starting on January 1, 2003, and leaving office on January 1, 2015, to serve in the Kentucky Senate. Embry was a mayor of Beaver Dam, Kentucky from 1970 until 1973. Embry died three days after his resignation from the senate for health reasons at a hospice in Bowling Green, at the age of 81.

== Education ==
Embry attended Duke University, Kentucky Wesleyan College, University of Kentucky, and University of Louisville, and earned his B.S. in English and geography from Western Kentucky University.

== Elections ==
On September 26, 2022, Embry resigned, resulting in the Kentucky Senate District 6 seat becoming vacant. On November 8, 2022, Republican nominee Lindsey Tichenor defeated write-in Democratic candidate Brian Easley. Tichenor was sworn in on January 1, 2023, officially replacing Embry in the Kentucky Senate.

- 2018 Embry was unopposed for the May 22, 2018 Republican Primary and defeated Democratic nominee Crystal Chappell in the November 6, 2018 General Election winning with 27,139 votes (67.2%).
- 2014 Embry was unopposed for the May 20, 2014 Republican Primary and defeated Democratic nominee William Cox Jr. in the November 4, 2014 General Election winning with 21,591 votes (57.1%).
- 2012 Embry was unopposed for both the May 22, 2012 Republican Primary and the November 6, 2012 General election, winning with 13,077 votes.
- 2010 Embry was unopposed for the May 18, 2010 Republican Primary and the November 2, 2010 General election, winning with 11,118 votes (79.7%) against Democratic nominee Les Russell.
- 2008 Embry was unopposed for both the 2008 Republican Primary and the November 4, 2008 General election, winning with 13,249 votes.
- 2006 Embry was unopposed for both the 2006 Republican Primary and the November 7, 2006 General election, winning with 9,830 votes.
- 2004 Embry was challenged in the 2004 Republican Primary, winning with 2,176 votes (74.3%) and won the November 2, 2004 General election with 11,045 votes (69.3%) against Democratic nominee Larry Ashlock.
- 2002 When District 17 Representative Woody Allen left the Legislature and left the seat open, Embry won the three-way 2002 Republican Primary with 3,164 votes (43.1%) and won the November 5, 2002 General election with 7,518 votes (66.4%) against Democratic nominee James Hampton.
