= Terry Shelton =

American politician

Member of the Kentucky House of Representatives from the 19th district
- In office January 1, 2005 – January 1, 2007
- Preceded by: Dottie Sims
- Succeeded by: Dottie Sims

Personal details
- Party: Republican

Terry Lynn Shelton (born September 14, 1952) is an American politician from Kentucky who was a member of the Kentucky House of Representatives from 2005 to 2007. Shelton was elected in 2004, defeating Democratic incumbent Dottie Sims. He served one term in the house until his defeat by Sims in a rematch in 2006.
