= Royce Adams (politician) =

American politician (1938–2023)

Royce W. Adams

Member of the Kentucky House of Representatives from the 61st district
- In office September 30, 1992 – January 1, 2013
- Preceded by: Clay Crupper
- Succeeded by: Brian Linder

Personal details
- Born: September 29, 1938 Williamstown, Kentucky, U.S.
- Died: August 11, 2023 (aged 84) Williamstown, Kentucky, U.S.
- Party: Democratic

Royce William Adams (September 29, 1938 – August 11, 2023) was an American politician from Kentucky who was a member of the Kentucky House of Representatives from 1992 to 2013. Adams was first elected in a September 1992 special election following the resignation of incumbent Clay Crupper. He did not seek reelection in 2012 and was succeeded by Republican Brian Linder.

Adams served in the U.S. Army from 1961 to 1965. He married Rita Haydon in 1959, and they had two daughters. Adams died from Parkinson's disease on August 11, 2023, aged 84.
