= Richie Sanders =

American politician

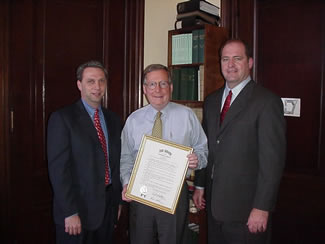
- Sanders with Mitch McConnell and Jeff Hoover in May 2001

Member of the Kentucky Senate from the 9th district
- In office June 1996 – January 1, 2009
- Preceded by: Walter Arnold Baker
- Succeeded by: David P. Givens

Member of the Kentucky House of Representatives from the 19th district
- In office January 1, 1991 – June 1996
- Preceded by: Ronny Layman
- Succeeded by: Anthony Mello

Personal details
- Born: August 6, 1963 (age 62) Smiths Grove, Kentucky
- Party: Republican

Richard A. Sanders (born August 6, 1963) is an American politician who served in the Kentucky House of Representatives from the 19th district from 1991 to 1996 and in the Kentucky Senate from the 9th district from 1996 to 2009.

Sanders was first elected to the house in 1990 after defeating incumbent representative Ronny Layman in the Republican primary election. He served in the house until winning a special election to Kentucky Senate in June 1996. He did not seek reelection in 2008.
