= Kim L. Nelson =

American politician

Kim Nelson

Member of the Kentucky Senate from the 6th district
- In office June 6, 1989 – January 1, 1999
- Preceded by: William T. Brinkley
- Succeeded by: Dick Adams

Personal details
- Born: February 19, 1948 (age 78)
- Party: Democratic

Kim L. Nelson (born February 19, 1948) is an American politician from Kentucky who was a member of the Kentucky Senate from 1989 to 1999. Nelson was first elected in a May 1989 special election following the death of incumbent senator William T. Brinkley. He was defeated for renomination in 1998 by Dick Adams.
