= Ken Gibson (Kentucky politician) =

American politician

Member of the Kentucky Senate from the 6th district
- In office June 8, 1972 – January 1, 1987
- Preceded by: William A. Logan
- Succeeded by: William T. Brinkley

Personal details
- Born: 1933 (age 92–93)
- Party: Democratic

Kenneth Omar Gibson Sr. (born 1933) is an American politician from Kentucky who was a member of the Kentucky Senate from 1972 to 1987. Gibson was first elected in a May 1972 special election following the resignation of incumbent senator William Logan. On June 15, 1972, Gibson was one of seven Democratic senators who voted against Kentucky's ratification of the Equal Rights Amendment. He retired from the Senate in 1986.
