= Dick Adams (Kentucky politician) =

American politician

Member of the Kentucky Senate from the 6th district
- In office January 1, 1999 – January 1, 2003
- Preceded by: Kim L. Nelson
- Succeeded by: Jerry Rhoads

Personal details
- Born: March 10, 1943
- Died: April 3, 2006 (aged 63)
- Party: Democratic

Richard Adams (March 10, 1943 – April 3, 2006) was an American politician from Kentucky who was a member of the Kentucky Senate from 1999 to 2003. Adams was elected in 1998, defeating incumbent senator Kim L. Nelson for renomination. He did not seek reelection in 2002.

He died in April 2006 at age 63.
