= Kentucky's 24th Senate district =

American legislative district

Kentucky's 24th State Senate district
Senator
Shelley Funke Frommeyer; R–Alexandria
since January 1, 2023
- Registration: 47.3% Republican; 38.3% Democratic; 13.7% No party preference
- Demographics: 90.1% White; 3.2% Black; 2.7% Hispanic; 0.8% Asian; 0.1% Native American; 0.2% Other; 2.8% Multiracial
- Population (2023): 120,875
- Registered voters (2025): 102,044

Kentucky's 24th Senatorial district is one of 38 districts in the Kentucky Senate. Located in the northern part of the state, it comprises the counties of Bracken, Campbell, Pendleton, and part of Kenton. It has been represented by Shelley Funke Frommeyer (R–Alexandria) since 2023. As of 2023, the district had a population of 120,875.

From 1887 to 1900, the district was represented by William Goebel, who was declared the winner in the contested 1899 gubernatorial election.

== Voter registration ==
On January 1, 2025, the district had 102,044 registered voters, who were registered with the following parties.

Party	Registration	
Party	Voters	%
Republican	48,219	47.25
Democratic	39,060	38.28
Independent	6,671	6.54
Libertarian	653	0.64
Green	99	0.10
Constitution	39	0.04
Socialist Workers	24	0.02
Reform	9	0.01
"Other"	7,270	7.12
Total	102,044	100.00
Source: Kentucky State Board of Elections

== Election results from statewide races ==
=== 2014 – 2020 ===
Year	Office	Results (Note: Figures presented in this table are calculated by summing precinct election results published by the Kentucky State Board of Elections, using precinct data that list each precinct's senatorial district.)
2014	Senator	McConnell 60.0 - 36.1%
2015	Governor	Bevin 54.8 - 41.3%
2015	Secretary of State	Knipper 56.5 - 43.5%
2015	Attorney General	Westerfield 50.9 - 49.1%
2015	Auditor of Public Accounts	Harmon 60.9 - 39.1%
2015	State Treasurer	Ball 63.3 - 36.7%
2015	Commissioner of Agriculture	Quarles 61.1 - 38.9%
2016	President	Trump 62.2 - 31.8%
2016	Senator	Paul 66.4 - 33.6%
2019	Governor	Beshear 49.5 - 48.4%
2019	Secretary of State	Adams 51.5 - 48.5%
2019	Attorney General	Cameron 59.9 - 40.1%
2019	Auditor of Public Accounts	Harmon 56.2 - 39.1%
2019	State Treasurer	Ball 61.2 - 38.8%
2019	Commissioner of Agriculture	Quarles 56.5 - 38.9%
2020	President	Trump 62.3 - 35.8%
2020	Senator	McConnell 57.2 - 38.6%
2020	Amendment 1	Yes 67.0 - 33.0%
2020	Amendment 2	No 70.6 - 29.4%

=== 2022 – present ===
Year	Office	Results
2022	Senator	Paul 61.4 - 38.6%
2022	Amendment 1	No 52.5 - 47.5%
2022	Amendment 2	No 54.7 - 45.3%
2023	Governor	Beshear 52.2 - 47.8%
2023	Secretary of State	Adams 57.9 - 42.1%
2023	Attorney General	Coleman 56.6 - 43.4%
2023	Auditor of Public Accounts	Ball 59.3 - 40.7%
2023	State Treasurer	Metcalf 57.1 - 42.9%
2023	Commissioner of Agriculture	Shell 57.9 - 42.1%
2024	President	Trump 62.2 - 35.9%
2024	Amendment 1	Yes 62.7 - 37.3%
2024	Amendment 2	No 63.7 - 36.3%

== List of members representing the district ==
Member	Party	Years	Electoral history	District location
John J. Moloney (Covington)	Democratic	January 1, 1966 – November 6, 1966	Elected in 1965. Died.	1964–1972
Clyde Middleton (Fort Mitchell)	Republican	November 1967 – January 1, 1987	Elected to finish Moloney's term. Reelected in 1969. Reelected in 1973. Reelected in 1977. Reelected in 1981. Lost reelection.	1964–1972
Clyde Middleton (Fort Mitchell)	Republican	November 1967 – January 1, 1987	Elected to finish Moloney's term. Reelected in 1969. Reelected in 1973. Reelected in 1977. Reelected in 1981. Lost reelection.	1972–1974
Clyde Middleton (Fort Mitchell)	Republican	November 1967 – January 1, 1987	Elected to finish Moloney's term. Reelected in 1969. Reelected in 1973. Reelected in 1977. Reelected in 1981. Lost reelection.	1974–1984
Clyde Middleton (Fort Mitchell)	Republican	November 1967 – January 1, 1987	Elected to finish Moloney's term. Reelected in 1969. Reelected in 1973. Reelected in 1977. Reelected in 1981. Lost reelection.	1984–1993; Boone and Kenton (part) Counties.
John Weaver (Walton)	Democratic	January 1, 1987 – February 25, 1989	Elected in 1986. Died.	1984–1993; Boone and Kenton (part) Counties.
Patti Weaver (Walton)	Democratic	June 6, 1989 – January 1, 1991	Elected to finish her husband's term. Retired.	1984–1993; Boone and Kenton (part) Counties.
Dick Roeding (Fort Mitchell)	Republican	January 1, 1991 – January 1, 1993	Elected in 1990. Resigned after being elected to the 11th senate district.	1984–1993; Boone and Kenton (part) Counties.
Gex Williams (Verona)	Republican	March 3, 1993 – January 1, 1999	Elected to finish Roeding's term. Reelected in 1994. Retired to run for Kentucky's; 4th congressional district.	1993–1997
Gex Williams (Verona)	Republican	March 3, 1993 – January 1, 1999	Elected to finish Roeding's term. Reelected in 1994. Retired to run for Kentucky's; 4th congressional district.	1997–2003
Katie Kratz Stine (Southgate)	Republican	January 1, 1999 – January 1, 2015	Elected in 1998. Reelected in 2002. Reelected in 2006. Reelected in 2010. Retired.	1997–2003
Katie Kratz Stine (Southgate)	Republican	January 1, 1999 – January 1, 2015	Elected in 1998. Reelected in 2002. Reelected in 2006. Reelected in 2010. Retired.	2003–2015
Wil Schroder (Wilder)	Republican	January 1, 2015 – January 1, 2023	Elected in 2014. Reelected in 2018. Retired.	2015–2023
Shelley Funke Frommeyer (Alexandria)	Republican	January 1, 2023 – present	Elected in 2022. Reelected in 2026.	2023–present
