= William I. Donnermeyer Sr. =

American politician (1924–2025)

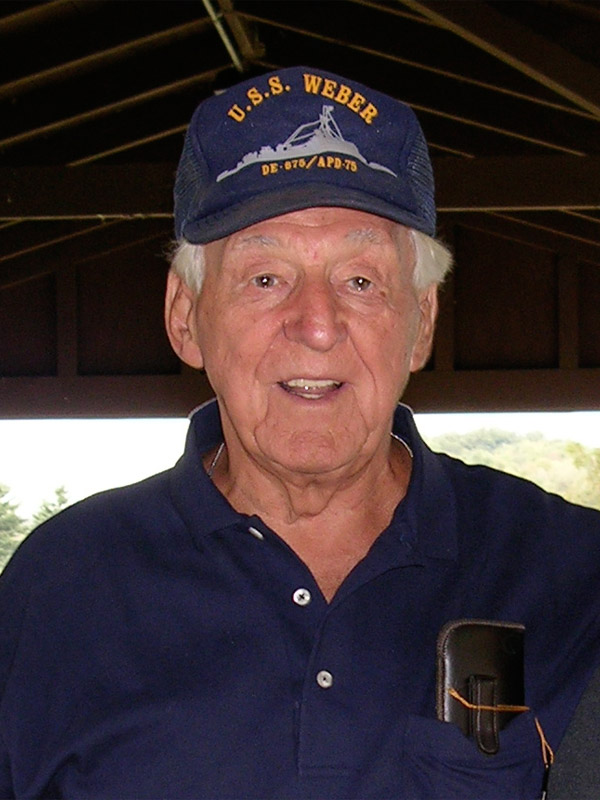

Member of the Kentucky House of Representatives from the 68th district
- In office January 1, 1970 – August 1994
- Preceded by: Carl Bamberger
- Succeeded by: Katie Kratz Stine

Personal details
- Born: William Irvin Donnermeyer; September 19, 1924 Dayton, Kentucky, U.S.
- Died: August 25, 2025 (aged 100) Fort Thomas, Kentucky, U.S.
- Party: Democratic
- Spouse: Mary Donnermeyer

William Irvin Donnermeyer Sr. (September 19, 1924 – August 25, 2025) was an American politician. He was elected in 1969 to the 68th district of the House of Representatives for the Commonwealth of Kentucky and was first seated in 1970. Donnermeyer retired in 1994, having served continuously for 25 years. He was a member of the Bellevue Veterans Club. Donnermeyer served in the US Navy during World War II.

Donnermeyer lived in Bellevue, Kentucky. He turned 100 on September 19, 2024, and died in Fort Thomas, Kentucky, on August 25, 2025, aged 100.
