= Tommy Todd (politician) =

American politician

Member of the Kentucky House of Representatives from the 83rd district
- In office January 1, 1982 – January 1, 1997
- Preceded by: Marshall Davenport
- Succeeded by: Jeff Hoover

Personal details
- Born: 1927
- Died: May 13, 2018 (aged 90)
- Party: Republican

Thomas W. "Tommy" Todd (1927 – May 13, 2018) was an American politician from Kentucky who was a member of the Kentucky House of Representatives from 1982 to 1997. Todd was first elected in 1981 after incumbent representative Marshall Davenport retired. He was defeated for renomination in 1996 by Jeff Hoover.

He died in May 2018 at age 90.
