= John Stacy =

American politician

Judge/Executive of Morgan County
- In office January 2019 – January 2023

Majority Whip of the Kentucky House of Representatives
- In office January 6, 2009 – January 4, 2011
- Preceded by: Rob Wilkey
- Succeeded by: Tommy Thompson

Member of the Kentucky House of Representatives from the 71st district
- In office January 1, 1993 – January 1, 2015
- Preceded by: Jerry Ravenscraft
- Succeeded by: Jonathan Shell (redistricting)

Personal details
- Born: March 29, 1953 (age 73)
- Party: Democratic
- Education: Morehead State University; Salmon P. Chase College of Law

John Will Stacy (born March 29, 1953) is an American politician and a former Democratic member of the Kentucky House of Representatives who represented district 71 from 1993 to 2015. He was first elected to the house in 1992, defeating Democratic incumbent Jerry Ravenscraft for renomiation. He did not seek reelection in 2014. He then served as Judge/Executive of Morgan County from 2019 to 2023.

== Education ==
Stacy earned his BS from Morehead State University and his JD from Northern Kentucky University's Salmon P. Chase College of Law.

== Elections ==
- 2012 Stacy was challenged in the May 22, 2012 Democratic Primary, winning with 1,569 votes (66.0%) and was unopposed for the November 6, 2012 General election, winning with 10,737 votes.
- 1992 Stacy was initially elected in the 1992 Democratic Primary and the November 3, 1992 General election.
- 1994 Stacy was unopposed for both the 1994 Democratic Primary and the November 8, 1994 General election.
- 1996 Stacy was unopposed for both the 1996 Democratic Primary and the November 5, 1996 General election.
- 1998 Stacy was unopposed for both the 1998 Democratic Primary and the November 3, 1998 General election.
- 2000 Stacy was unopposed for both the 2000 Democratic Primary and the November 7, 2000 General election, winning with 9,275 votes.
- 2002 Stacy was unopposed for both the 2002 Democratic Primary and the November 5, 2002 General election, winning with 6,692 votes.
- 2004 Stacy was challenged in the 2004 Democratic Primary, winning with 2,747 votes (82.5%) and was unopposed for the November 2, 2004 General election, winning with 10,329 votes.
- 2006 Stacy was challenged in the 2006 Democratic Primary, winning with 7,771 votes (71.1%) and was unopposed for the November 7, 2006 General election, winning with 10,228 votes.
- 2008 Stacy was unopposed for both the 2008 Democratic Primary and the November 4, 2008 General election, winning with 10,970 votes.
- 2010 Stacy was unopposed for the May 18, 2010 Democratic Primary and won the November 2, 2010 General election with 8,257 votes (63.7%) against Independent candidate Christian Weigel.
