= David P. Givens =

American politician

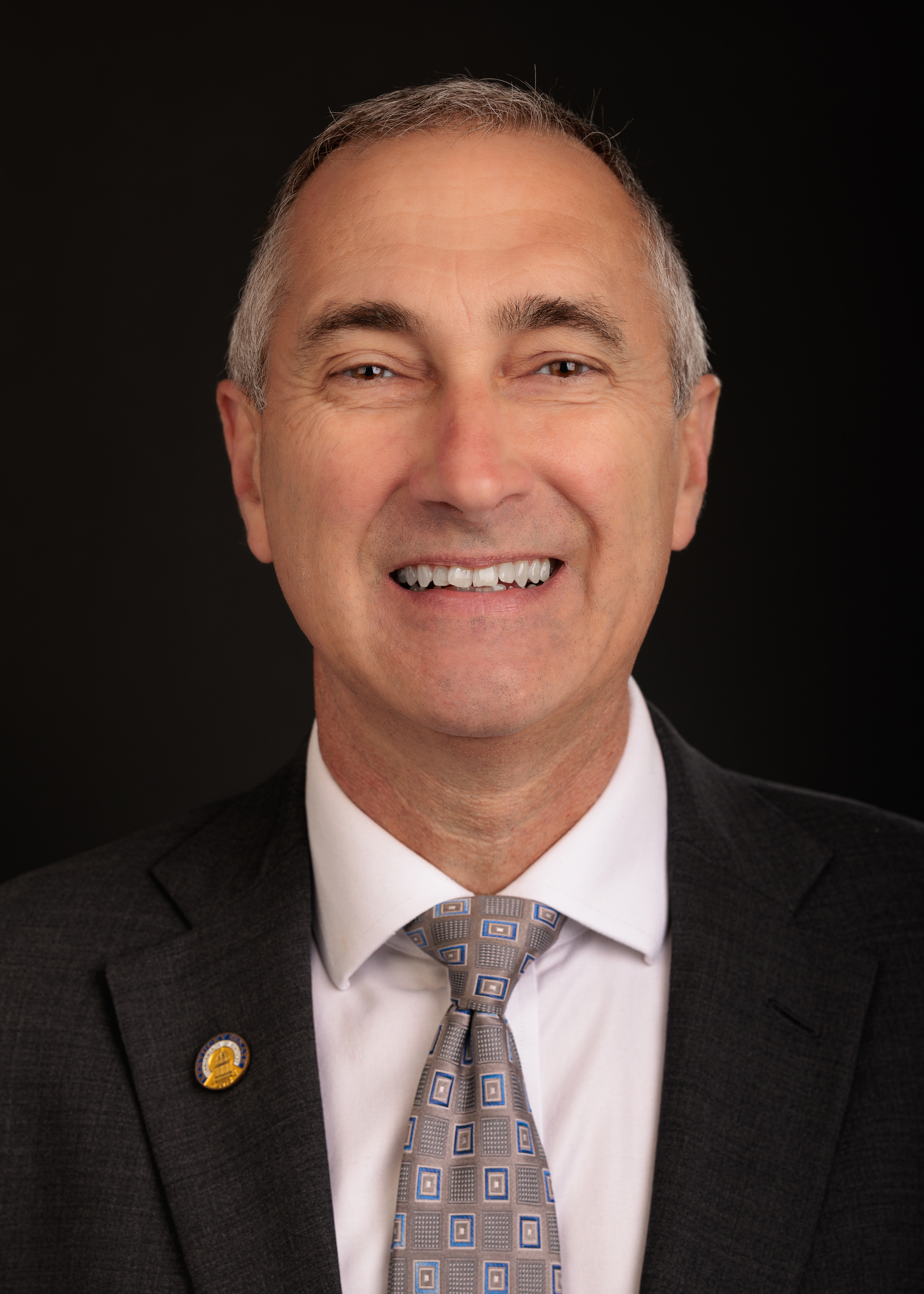
- Official portrait, 2025

President pro tempore of the Kentucky Senate
- Incumbent
- Assumed office January 8, 2019
- Preceded by: Jimmy Higdon
- In office January 6, 2015 – July 1, 2017
- Preceded by: Katie Kratz Stine
- Succeeded by: Jimmy Higdon

Member of the Kentucky Senate from the 9th district
- Incumbent
- Assumed office January 1, 2009
- Preceded by: Richie Sanders

Personal details
- Born: December 26, 1966 (age 59) Greensburg, Kentucky, U.S.
- Party: Republican
- Spouse: Laurie K. Givens
- Children: 3
- Education: Western Kentucky University (BS, MA)

David P. Givens (born December 26, 1966) is an American politician who has served in the Kentucky Senate from the 9th district since 2009. Givens was re-elected by the members of the Kentucky State Senate as the President pro tempore of the Kentucky Senate and has served in the office for the 2019 Legislative Session, 2020 Legislative Session, and 2021 Legislative Session.

== Education ==
1985 Green County High School, valedictorian. WKU, MA 1997. WKU, BS Ag 1989

Kentucky Senate
Preceded by Katie Kratz Stine	President pro tempore of the Kentucky Senate; 2015–2017	Succeeded by Jimmy Higdon
Preceded by Jimmy Higdon	President pro tempore of the Kentucky Senate; 2019–present	Incumbent
