= Steve Rawlings =

American politician

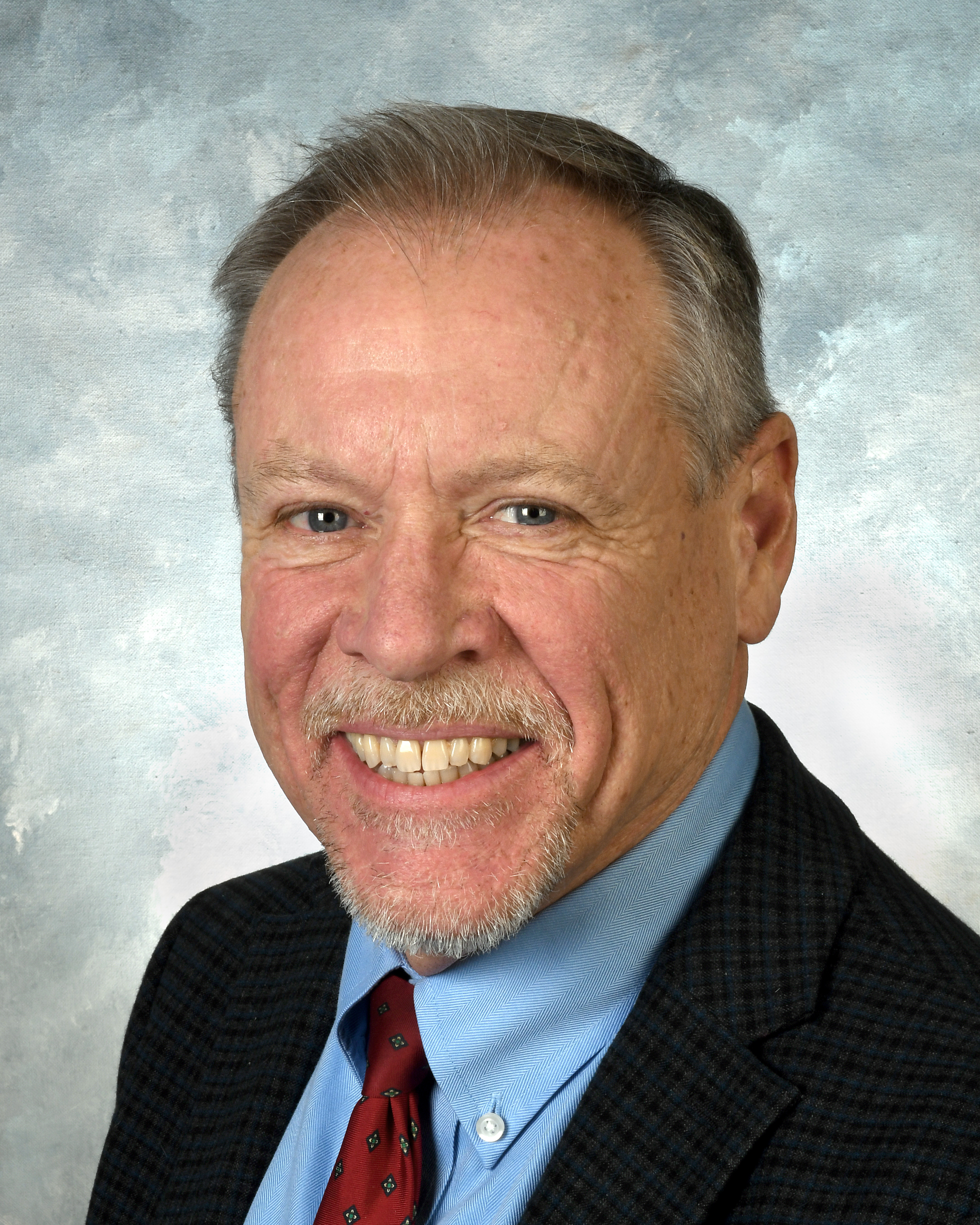

Member of the Kentucky Senate from the 11th district
- Incumbent
- Assumed office January 1, 2025
- Preceded by: John Schickel

Member of the Kentucky House of Representatives from the 66th district
- In office January 1, 2023 – January 1, 2025
- Preceded by: C. Ed Massey
- Succeeded by: T. J. Roberts

Personal details
- Party: Republican
- Education: University of Cincinnati (BBA); Northern Kentucky University (JD)

John Steven Rawlings (born April 5, 1957) is an American attorney and politician who has served as a Republican member of the Kentucky Senate since January 2025. His district includes the northern part of Boone County. He previously was a member of the Kentucky House of Representatives from 2023 to 2025.

In 2024, Rawlings was elected to the Kentucky Senate to represent Kentucky's 11th Senate district following the retirement of incumbent John Schickel.

== Background ==
Rawlings is the son of Herb and Pat Rawlings, nephew of Rawlings Group founder and philanthropist George Rawlings, and the grandson of John William Rawlings, a prominent pastor and advisor to Liberty University founder Jerry Falwell, and the namesake of Liberty University's John W. Rawlings School of Divinity.

He graduated from Greenhills High School before earning a Bachelor of Business Administration from the University of Cincinnati in 1980, and a Juris Doctor from the Northern Kentucky University Salmon P. Chase College of Law in 1989. During his time at Chase, Rawlings served as an associate editor of the Northern Kentucky Law Review.

Prior to entering politics, Rawlings was an attorney and author. Currently, he is the owner of My Father's Design, a tiny home construction company, and serves on the Merit Theatre Company board of directors as well as the judicial committee of USA Shooting.

== Political career ==
=== Elections ===
- 2022 Rawlings won the 2022 Republican primary with 2,695 votes (68.7%) against incumbent representative C. Ed Massey and won the 2022 Kentucky House of Representatives election with 11,235 votes (70.4%) against Democratic candidate Tim Montgomery.
- 2024 Incumbent senator John Schickel of Kentucky's 11th Senate District chose not to seek reelection. Rawlings won the 2024 Republican primary with 7,482 votes (77.4%) and was unopposed in the 2024 Kentucky Senate election, winning with 42,770 votes.
