= Jerry Ravenscraft =

American politician (born 1955)

Member of the Kentucky House of Representatives from the 71st district
- In office February 19, 1992 – January 1, 1993
- Preceded by: Walter Blevins
- Succeeded by: John Stacy

Personal details
- Party: Democratic

Jerry Ravenscraft (born 1955) is an American politician from Kentucky who was a member of the Kentucky House of Representatives in 1992. Ravenscraft was elected to the house in a February 1992 special election to fill the vacancy caused by the resignation of Walter Blevins. He was defeated for renomination for a full term in May 1992 by John Stacy.
