= William T. Brinkley =

American politician

William Brinkley

Member of the Kentucky Senate from the 6th district
- In office January 1, 1987 – March 2, 1989
- Preceded by: Ken Gibson
- Succeeded by: Kim L. Nelson

Member of the Kentucky House of Representatives from the 10th district
- In office November 1974 – January 1, 1987
- Preceded by: W. Michael Troop
- Succeeded by: Eddie Ballard

Personal details
- Born: December 15, 1936
- Died: March 2, 1989 (aged 52)
- Party: Democratic

William T. Brinkley (December 15, 1936 – March 2, 1989) was an American politician from Kentucky who was a member of the Kentucky House of Representatives from 1974 to 1987, and the Kentucky Senate from 1987 until his death in March 1989. Brinkley was first elected to the house in a November 1974 special election, following the resignation of incumbent representative Michael Troop. Brinkley had previously lost the 1973 Democratic primary election to Troop. Brinkley won reelection continuously to the house until his election to the senate in 1986, where he served until his death of a heart attack in March 1989.
