= Rob Wilkey =

American politician

Majority Whip of the Kentucky House of Representatives
- In office January 2, 2007 – January 1, 2009
- Preceded by: Joe Barrows
- Succeeded by: John Stacy

Member of the Kentucky House of Representatives from the 22nd district
- In office January 1, 1997 – January 1, 2009
- Preceded by: Richard Turner
- Succeeded by: Wilson Stone

Personal details
- Born: December 12, 1956 (age 69)
- Party: Democratic
- Spouse: Terry
- Education: University of Kentucky, University of Louisville
- Occupation: Attorney

Robert Dee Wilkey (born December 12, 1956) is a politician and a Democratic member of the Kentucky House of Representatives from 1997 to 2009, representing district 22. He served as Majority Whip. Wilkey was first elected to the house in 1996 after Republican incumbent Richard Turner retired. He did not seek reelection in 2008.

== Birth ==
Robert Wilkey was born on December 12, 1956.

== Religion ==
Robert Wilkey is Presbyterian.

== Family ==
Robert Wilkey is married to Terry, and together they have two children named Grace and Seth.

== Education ==
Wilkey received his education from the following institutions:

- JD, University of Louisville
- BA, University of Kentucky

== Political experience ==
Wilkey has had the following political experience:

- Majority Whip, Kentucky House of Representatives, 2007–2009
- Representative, Kentucky House of Representatives, 1997–2009

== Organizations ==
Wilkey has been a member of the following organizations:

- Board Member, Chamber of Commerce
- Chair, Ducks Unlimited
- Former President, Franklin-Simpson Chamber of Commerce
- Member, Kentucky Bar Association
- Former President, Optimist Club
- Elder, Bowling Green Presbyterian Church
