= John Schickel =

American politician

- Schickel in 2019

Member of the Kentucky Senate from the 11th district
- In office January 1, 2009 – January 1, 2025
- Preceded by: Dick Roeding
- Succeeded by: Steve Rawlings

United States Marshal for the Eastern District of Kentucky
- In office 2002–2008
- President: George W. Bush
- Preceded by: Steve Stone
- Succeeded by: David Watts

Jailer of Boone County
- In office 1987–2001
- Preceded by: Russell Luck
- Succeeded by: Ed Prindle

Personal details
- Born: March 29, 1954 (age 72) Mariemont, Ohio, US
- Relations: J. William Schickel (great-grandfather); William Schickel (father); Bill Schickel (brother)
- Education: Ohio State University; Northern Kentucky University
- Occupation: Law enforcement officer (retired)

John W. Schickel (born March 29, 1954) is an American politician and law enforcement officer who served as a member of the Kentucky Senate from 2009 to 2025, representing Kentucky's 11th Senate district.

He previously served as jailer of Boone County, Kentucky, from 1987 to 2001 and as United States Marshal for the Eastern District of Kentucky from 2002 to 2008.

== Early life and education ==
Schickel was born in Mariemont, Ohio. He was one of five sons and eleven children total born to Mary and William Schickel. His father was an artist, sculptor, and designer who created many stained glass and other liturgical commissions. Schickel's great-grandfather was J. William Schickel, a prominent New York architect and founder of the architecture firm Schickel & Ditmars. His brother, Bill Schickel, is an Iowa politician and broadcasting executive who served as a member of the Iowa House of Representatives as well as co-chair of the Republican Party of Iowa.

Schickel earned an associate degree from Ohio State University as well as a bachelor's degree and Master of Public Administration degree from Northern Kentucky University. From 1975 to 1977, he served as an officer of NKU's police department as well as the Florence police department from 1977 to 1987. On May 28, 1977, Schickel was one of the first law enforcement officers to arrive at the scene of the Beverly Hills Super Club fire.

== Political career ==
=== Boone County Jailer and US Marshal ===
In 1986, Schickel was elected jailer of Boone County. During his tenure, he was appointed by Governor Wallace Wilkinson as one of twelve members of the reconstituted Kentucky Crime Commission, tasked with advising the state on the criminal justice system. In 1990, Schickel attempted to establish a 40-bed work camp for county inmates in order to reduce overcrowding, but this proposal was unanimously rejected by the Boone County Fiscal Court. The measure was re-proposed and approved in 1996. From 1996 to 1997, Schickel served as president of the Kentucky Jailers Association.

Schickel also served as a delegate to the 2000 Republican National Convention.

In 2002, President George W. Bush nominated Schickel to be the next United States Marshal for the Eastern District of Kentucky. He served in this position until 2008.

=== State Senator ===
In 2008, incumbent senator Dick Roeding of Kentucky's 11th Senate district chose not to seek reelection. Schickel won the 2008 Republican primary by a margin of 24 votes against Charlie Walton, who had served as a representative from Kentucky's 66th House district from 1993 to 2005, and was unopposed in the 2008 Kentucky Senate election. He assumed office on January 1, 2009.

During his tenure, Schickel served as co-chair of the jail and corrections reform task force during the 2023 legislative interim, and as chairman of the Northern Kentucky Caucus. From 2011 until his retirement, Schickel served as chairman of the Senate licensing and occupations committee. While chairman, he had a policy that any bill not presented to his committee during the legislative interim would not be given a hearing by his committee during the legislative session, a policy which Majority Leader Damon Thayer coined as a bill being "Schickelized."

On November 14, 2023, Schickel announced that he would not be seeking reelection.

=== Boone County commission ===
On November 18, 2025, Schickel announced his campaign for a seat on the Boone County commission.

== Personal life ==
In 2012, Schickel began hosting Schickel's Pickles and Wieners Feast as a political fundraiser. Since 2022, the annual event has changed to become a fundraiser for Special Olympics Northern Kentucky (SONKY), with the event raising $58,000 in 2025.

Schickel is a substitute bus driver for Boone County Schools.
