= Katie Kratz Stine =

American politician (born 1956)

President pro tempore of the Kentucky Senate
- In office January 4, 2005 – January 1, 2015
- Preceded by: Dick Roeding
- Succeeded by: David P. Givens

Member of the Kentucky Senate from the 24th district
- In office January 1, 1999 – January 1, 2015
- Preceded by: Gex Williams
- Succeeded by: Wil Schroder

Member of the Kentucky House of Representatives from the 68th district
- In office January 1, 1995 – January 1, 1999
- Preceded by: William Donnermeyer
- Succeeded by: Joe Fischer

Personal details
- Born: December 6, 1956 (age 69) Covington, Kentucky, U.S.
- Party: Republican
- Spouse: Fred A. Stine
- Education: University of Cincinnati (BS); Salmon P. Chase College of Law (JD)
- Profession: Attorney

Katie Kratz Stine (born December 6, 1956) was a Republican member of the Kentucky Senate representing Campbell and Pendleton Counties as State Senator from the 24th Senate District from 1999 until 2015. She served as the President Pro tempore of the Kentucky State Senate. She did not seek reelection in 2014.

== Personal life ==
Stine lives in Southgate, Kentucky and is married to former Campbell Circuit Judge Fred A. Stine, who retired in 2017. They have two children, Caroline and Fritz. She graduated from the University of Cincinnati with a degree in Biology and from Northern Kentucky University's Salmon P. Chase College of Law.

== State representative ==
Stine served two terms in the Kentucky House of Representatives from 1995 to 1999. In 1994, she announced that she would challenge incumbent William "Bill" Donnermeyer. However, Donnermeyer announced that he would retire at the end of his term. Then Bellevue, Kentucky Mayor Tom Wiethorn, announced as the Democratic nominee for the seat. In November 1994, Stine won the election with 61% of the general election vote.

== State senator ==
In 1998, Stine announced that she would not run for re-election to the state House and would instead seek election to the Kentucky State Senate. State Senator Gex "Jay" Williams, the incumbent, chose not to run for reelection to the State Senate to run for the U.S. House of Representatives.

In her 1998 election to the State Senate, Stine defeated George Merritt with 72% of the general election vote.

In 1999, Stine was sworn in as a Kentucky State Senator. She was unchallenged in her re-election in 2002 and 2006. In 2010, she won re-election against Democrat Julie Smith Morrow with 69% of the vote.

=== Committee assignments ===
Session Committees

- Committee on Committees
- Economic Development, Tourism & Labor
- Enrollment
- Health & Welfare
- Judiciary - Vice Chair
- Natural Resources and Energy
- Rules
- Veterans, Military Affairs, & Public Protection

Interim Committees

- Economic Development and Tourism
- Energy Special Subcommittee
- Health and Welfare
- Judiciary; Labor and Industry
- Natural Resources & Environment
- Veterans, Military Affairs, and Public Protection

Statutory Committees

- Legislative Research Commission
- Medicaid Oversight and Advisory Committee - Co-Chair
- Program Review and Investigations Comm.

== President Pro tempore of the Senate ==
In 2005, Stine was elected by the State Senate Republican Caucus to be the Senate President Pro tempore. She was the first woman to serve in that role. She succeeded her fellow Northern Kentuckian, State Senator Richard "Dick" Roeding of Lakeside Park, Kentucky.

Political offices
Preceded by Dick Roeding	President Pro Tempore of the Kentucky Senate; 2005-2015	Succeeded by David P. Givens
Kentucky Senate
Preceded by Gex Williams	Kentucky State Senator from District 24; 1999-2015	Succeeded by Wil Schroder
Kentucky Senate
Preceded by William "Bill" Donnermeyer	Kentucky State Representative from District 68; 1995-1999	Succeeded by Joseph Fischer
