= Anthony Mello =

American politician

Member of the Kentucky House of Representatives from the 19th district
- In office November 1996 – January 1, 1997
- Preceded by: Richie Sanders
- Succeeded by: Dottie Sims

Personal details
- Born: December 24, 1946 (age 79)
- Party: Republican

Anthony Clinton Mello (born December 24, 1946) is an American politician from Kentucky who was a member of the Kentucky House of Representatives from November 1996 to January 1997. Mello was elected in a November 1996 special election following the resignation of incumbent Richie Sanders. He simultaneously lost the general election for the full two-year term to Democrat Dottie Sims.
