= Ronny Layman =

American politician

Member of the Kentucky House of Representatives from the 19th district
- In office January 1, 1978 – January 1, 1991
- Preceded by: Bill Vincent
- Succeeded by: Richie Sanders

Personal details
- Born: April 15, 1944 (age 82)
- Party: Republican

Ronald Ray Layman (born April 15, 1944) is an American politician from Kentucky who was a member of the Kentucky House of Representatives from 1978 to 1991. Layman was first elected in 1977, defeating incumbent Democratic representative Bill Vincent. He was defeated for renomination in 1990 by Richie Sanders.
