= Jim DeCesare =

American politician

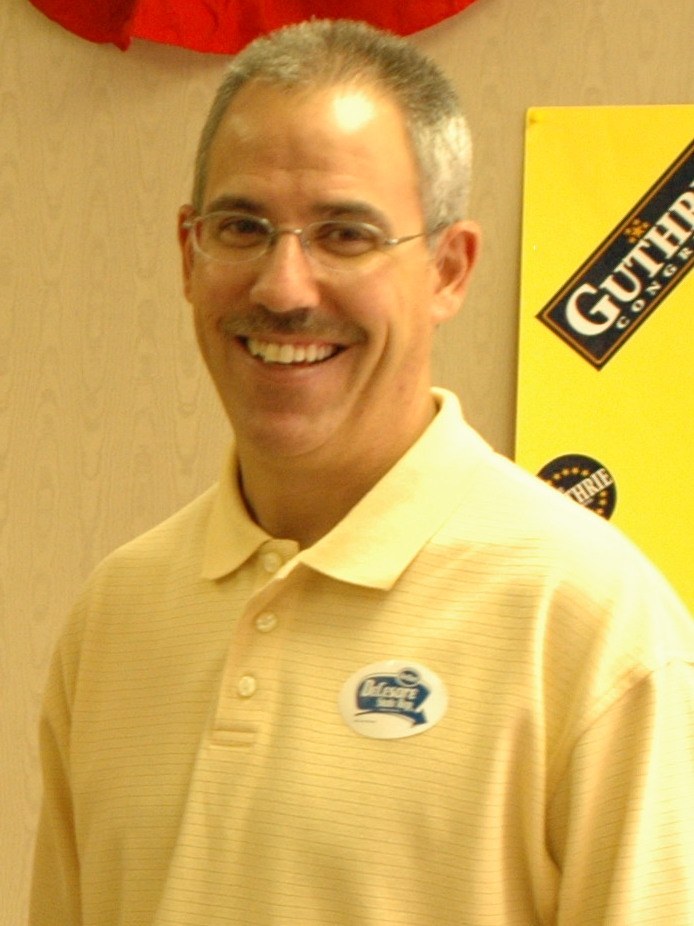

Member of the Kentucky House of Representatives
- In office January 1, 2005 – January 1, 2019
- Preceded by: Roger Thomas
- Succeeded by: Steve Sheldon
- Constituency: 21st district (2005–2015); 17th district (2015–2019)

Personal details
- Born: July 10, 1966 (age 60)

James Joseph DeCesare (born July 10, 1966) is an American politician and a former member of the Kentucky House of Representatives who represented District 21 from January 2005 to January 2015 and District 17 from January 2015 to January 2019.

== Elections ==
2018 DeCesare did not run for re-election. His seat was filled by Republican Steve Sheldon.

- 2016 DeCesare was unopposed for both the May 17, 2016 Republican Primary and the November 8, 2016 General election, winning with 17,761 votes.
- 2014 DeCesare was unopposed for both the May 20, 2014 Republican Primary and the November 4, 2014 General election, winning with 12,105 votes.
- 2012 DeCesare was unopposed for both the May 22, 2012 Republican Primary and the November 6, 2012 General election, winning with 15,946 votes.
- 2010 DeCesare was unopposed for both the May 18, 2010 Republican Primary and the November 2, 2010 General election, winning with 11,080 votes.
- 2008 DeCesare was unopposed for the 2008 Republican Primary and won the November 4, 2008 General election with 12,292 votes (59.5%) against Democratic nominee Charlene Rabold.
- 2006 DeCesare was unopposed for the 2006 Republican Primary and won the November 7, 2006 General election with 6,857 votes (51.5%) against Democratic nominee Malcolm Cherry.
- 2004 To challenge District 21 incumbent Democratic Representative Roger Thomas, DeCesare was unopposed for the 2004 Republican Primary and won the November 2, 2004 General election with 8,954 votes (50.5%) against Representative Thomas.

Political offices
Preceded by Roger Thomas	Member of the Kentucky House of Representatives from the 21st district 2005–2015	Succeeded by Bart Rowland
Preceded by C. B. Embry	Member of the Kentucky House of Representatives from the 17th district 2015–2019	Succeeded by Steve Sheldon
