= William Schickel (artist) =

American artist and designer (1919–2009)

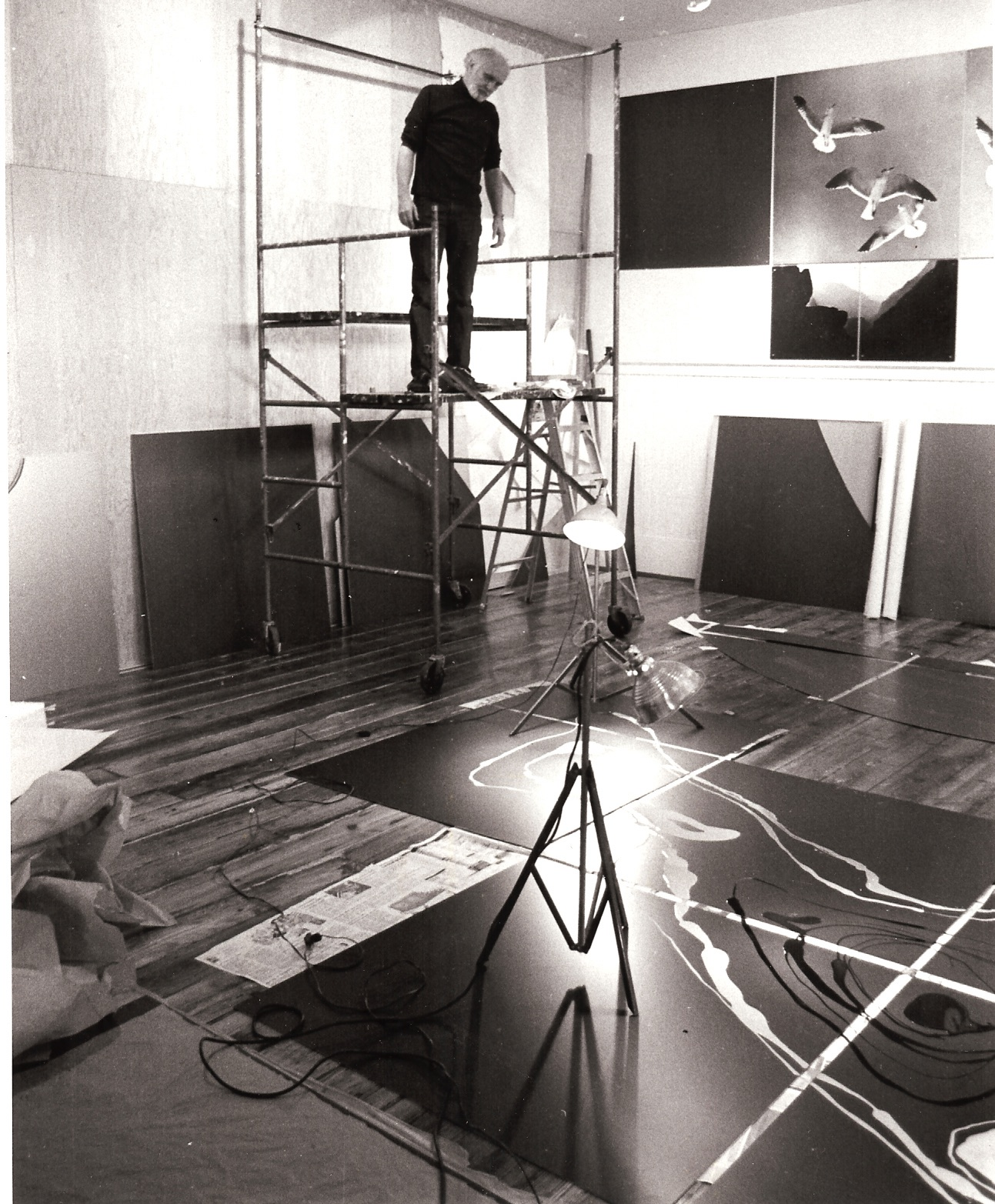

William Schickel (1919 – July 14, 2009) was an American artist and designer. His stained glass, painting, sculpture, furniture, and building design is characterized by neo-Thomism and modernism and is influenced by the writings of Jacques Maritain.

== Biography ==
Schickel was born in 1919 in Stamford, Connecticut, the grandson of German-American architect J. William Schickel, and grew up in Ithaca, New York. As a student at the University of Notre Dame, he studied under the philosopher Yves Simon and the stained-glass artist Emil Frei, Jr., whose daughter Mary he would soon marry. He graduated from Notre Dame in 1944.

The Schickels moved to Loveland, Ohio, so that Mary could be close to Grailville, the national headquarters of the Grail movement of which she was a member. William Schickel established a design studio there in 1948. The Schickels had five sons and six daughters, including Iowa politician and broadcast executive Bill Schickel, and Kentucky politician John Schickel. In 1952, William Schickel was diagnosed with lymphoma, which went into remission after a pilgrimage to St. Charles, Missouri.

On July 14, 2009, Schickel died in Loveland of complications from pneumonia. The William Schickel Gallery in Loveland has continued to display his works.

== Notable works ==
Over his more than 60-year career, Schickel was involved in the design or renovation of many liturgical structures. One of his earliest works was the 1962 conversion of a 1813 barn in Loveland into the Grailville Oratory. He won an Architects Society of Ohio award for the 1960s renovation of the Abbey of Our Lady of Gethsemani, the oldest Trappist abbey in the United States, in which the Gothic Revival vaulting was replaced by a minimalist design in keeping with Second Vatican Council reforms. His other liturgical commissions include Bellarmine Chapel at Xavier University in Cincinnati and the Shrine of St. Rose Philippine Duchesne in St. Charles, Missouri, an early example of a church in the round.

Schickel's secular works include the Rotunda of Creation at the Mercy Centers for Health and Wellness in Anderson Township and Fairfield, Ohio, and the Kane County Correctional Complex in Aurora, Illinois.
