= Michael Meredith (politician) =

American politician (born 1985)

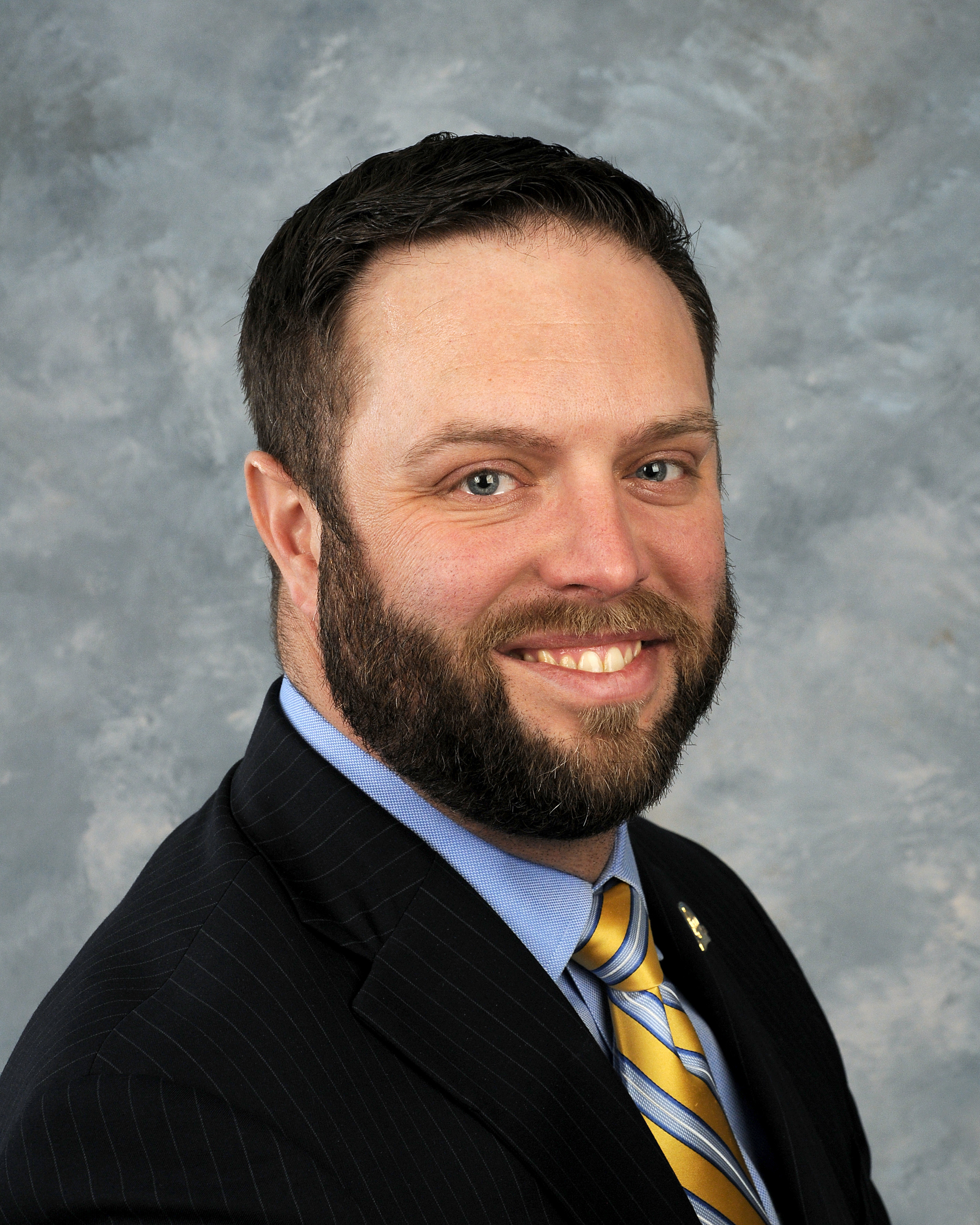

Member of the Kentucky House of Representatives from the 19th district
- Incumbent
- Assumed office January 1, 2011
- Preceded by: Dottie Sims

Personal details
- Born: April 25, 1985 (age 41)
- Party: Republican
- Education: Western Kentucky University (BS)
- Committees: Banking and Insurance (Chair); Licensing, Occupations, and Administrative Regulations; Local Government

Michael Lee Meredith (born April 25, 1985) is an American politician and a Republican member of the Kentucky House of Representatives from Kentucky's 19th House district since January 2011. His district is composed of Edmonson County as well as part of Warren County.

== Background ==
Meredith was raised on a beef farm in Edmonson County. He graduated from Edmonson County High School, and went on to earn a Bachelor of Science in business management from Western Kentucky University.

He has been employed by the Bank of Edmonson County since the age of 16, and currently is employed as a loan officer. He is a member of the Edmonson Lions Club, Edmonson County Leadership Alumni, Mammoth Cave National Park Association, and the Arts of Southern Kentucky Arts Advocacy Committee. He is a past member of the Edmonson County Tourism Commission, Edmonson County Community Education Council, Edmonson County High School Youth Service Center Advisory Board, and LifeSkills Inc. Board of Directors.

== Political career ==
=== Elections ===
- 2010 Meredith won the May 18, 2010 Republican Primary with 3,017 votes (75.9%) and won the November 2, 2010 General election with 8,368 votes (58.0%) against incumbent Democratic Representative Dottie Sims.
- 2012 Meredith and former Democratic Representative Sims both won their May 22, 2012 primaries, setting up a rematch, but Sims withdrew, leaving Meredith unopposed for the November 6, 2012 General election, winning with 12,770 votes.
- 2014 Meredith was unopposed in the 2014 Republican primary, and won the 2014 Kentucky House of Representatives election against Democratic candidate John Wayne Smith, winning with 8,165 votes (62.4%).
- 2016 Meredith was unopposed in the 2016 Republican primary, and won the 2016 Kentucky House of Representatives election against Democratic candidate John Wayne Smith, winning with 12,455 votes (68.9%).
- 2018 Meredith won the 2018 Republican primary with 2,821 votes (65.2%) against challenger Brian Kent Strow. Meredith won the 2018 Kentucky House of Representatives election against Democratic candidate William Fishback, winning with 9,313 votes (61.5%).
- 2020 Meredith was unopposed in the 2020 Republican primary, and won the 2020 Kentucky House of Representatives election against Democratic candidate Daniel Wayne Johnson, winning with 14,638 votes (69.4%).
- 2022 Meredith was unopposed in both the 2022 Republican primary and the 2022 Kentucky House of Representatives election, winning with 11,852 votes.
- 2024 Meredith won the 2024 Republican primary with 3,334 votes (75.9%) against challenger Kelcey Rock and was unopposed in the 2024 Kentucky House of Representatives election, winning with 18,135 votes.
