= Michael Cormack =

American politician (born 1970)

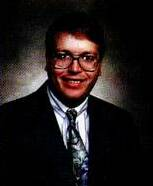

Member of the Iowa House of Representatives
- In office January 9, 1995 – January 12, 2003

Personal details
- Born: April 22, 1970 (age 56) Fort Dodge, Iowa, U.S.
- Party: Republican
- Education: Minnesota State University, Mankato
- Occupation: teacher

Michael G. Cormack (born April 22, 1970) is an American politician in the state of Iowa.

Cormack was born in Fort Dodge, Iowa and attended Minnesota State University, Mankato. A Republican, he served in the Iowa House of Representatives from 1995 to 2003 (13th district)
