= Richard Turner (Kentucky politician) =

American politician (born 1935)

Minority Leader of the Kentucky House of Representatives
- In office January 3, 1984 – January 6, 1987
- Preceded by: Art Schmidt
- Succeeded by: Willard Allen

Member of the Kentucky House of Representatives from the 22nd district
- In office January 1, 1980 – January 1, 1997
- Preceded by: Buel Guy
- Succeeded by: Rob Wilkey
- In office January 1, 1976 – January 1, 1978
- Preceded by: Carl Bowles
- Succeeded by: Buel Guy

Personal details
- Born: January 12, 1935 Monroe County, Kentucky, U.S.
- Party: Republican
- Spouse: Brenda Turner
- Children: 4
- Occupation: Politician

Richard All Turner (born January 12, 1935) is an American politician from the commonwealth of Kentucky. He served in the Kentucky House of Representatives as a Republican from 1976 to 1978 and 1980 to 1997.

Turner was caught in the FBI investigation of Kentucky horse racing industry called Operation Boptrot. He was convicted of filing a fake campaign finance report.

== Career ==
Prior to entering politics, Richard Turner studied at Tompkinsville High School, where upon graduating then served and enlisted in the military as a staff sergeant in the Air Force during the Korean War as an instructor. Upon honorably completing his military service, he enrolled at Western Kentucky University from 1958 to 1962, where he majored in history. After completing his bachelor's degree, he went on to teach in a one-room schoolhouse less than five miles from where he was born.

Turner was elected to the House of Representatives in 1976, succeeding Carl Bowles as a representor of the state of Kentucky. After being succeeded by Buel Guy, he later started work at the Modern Woodmen of America, doing so currently along with managing and tending to his farmland.

== Personal life ==
Turner resides in Tompkinsville, Kentucky, with his spouse Brenda Turner. He is an active member of the Free Masons and spends his time with family and friends while being an active member of Fairview Baptist Church.

Party political offices
Preceded by Ron C. Gray, Jr.	Republican nominee for Agriculture Commissioner of Kentucky; 1983	Succeeded by John Underwood, Jr
