= President pro tempore of the Kentucky Senate =

Highest-ranking member of the Senate

- Seal of Kentucky

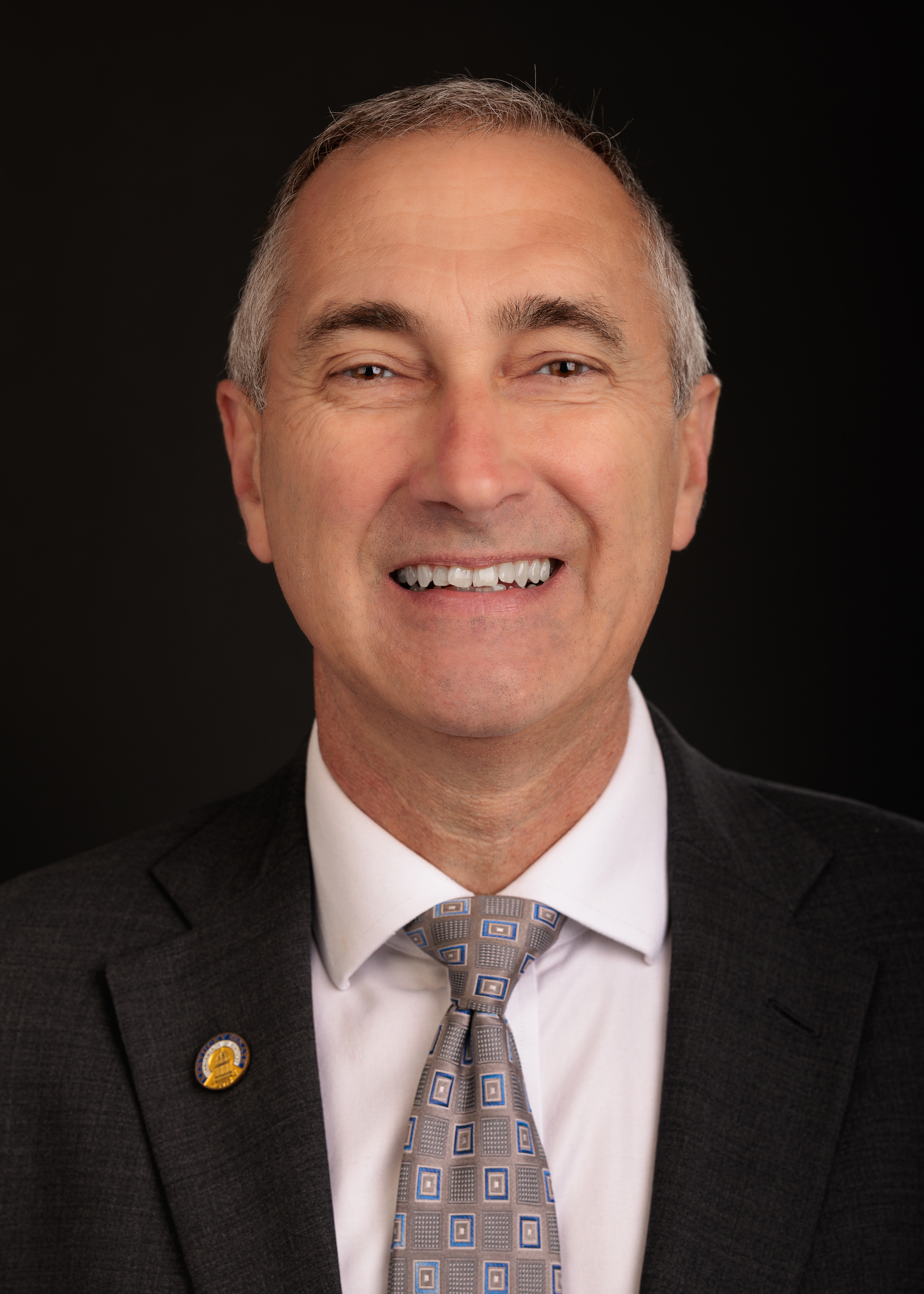
- Incumbent; David P. Givens since January 8, 2019
- Kentucky Senate
- Abbreviation: Senate President Pro Tem
- Member of: Legislative Research Commission
- Seat: Kentucky State Capitol, Frankfort, Kentucky
- Nominator: Major parties (normally)
- Appointer: The Kentucky Senate
- Term length: Two years (currently)
- Constituting instrument: Constitution of Kentucky
- Superseded by: President of the Kentucky Senate (as highest-ranking member)

President Pro Tempore of the Kentucky Senate is a post within the Kentucky Senate in the US.

Historically, it was the title of highest-ranking member of the Kentucky Senate prior to enactment of a 1992 amendment to the Constitution of Kentucky.

Prior to the 1992 amendment of Section 83 of the Constitution of Kentucky the Lieutenant Governor of Kentucky was the Senate's presiding officer, but was rarely present. The President pro tempore of the Kentucky Senate – called the Senate President Pro Tem for short – acted as the de facto presiding officer. The President Pro Tem usually presided over the body and was the most influential member of that body.

The President Pro Tem was almost always chosen by the majority party from among their members, then elected on a party line vote.

After the 1992 amendment, the Lieutenant Governor was stripped of all duties relating to the Senate. A new office, President of the Kentucky Senate, was created under amended Sections 84, 85, 86 and 87 of the Constitution of Kentucky; the President of the Kentucky Senate was given power to preside over the Senate.

The last President pro tempore to serve as the highest-ranking member of the Kentucky Senate was John "Eck" Rose. He continued as President of the Kentucky Senate once that office was established.

The office of President pro tempore continued in existence as, nominally, the second highest ranking position in the body, though as a practical matter the Majority Leader usually wielded more influence and power in the chamber. Before and after the creation of the office of President of the Kentucky Senate, the Senate President pro tempore served as a member of the Legislative Research Commission.

== Past Presidents Pro Tempore ==
- Lawrence Wetherby (1965)
- David P. Givens (2019–2021)

== See also ==
- Kentucky General Assembly
- President of the Senate
- Katie Kratz Stine
