= Clay Crupper =

American politician

Member of the Kentucky House of Representatives from the 61st district
- In office January 1, 1974 – June 9, 1992
- Preceded by: Tommy Reed
- Succeeded by: Royce Adams

Personal details
- Born: October 12, 1935 Owen County, Kentucky, United States
- Died: June 20, 2019 (aged 83)
- Party: Democratic

Clay Crupper (October 12, 1935 – June 20, 2019) was an American politician in the state of Kentucky. He served in the Kentucky House of Representatives from 1974 to 1992. He was a Democrat.
