= Art Schmidt =

American politician (1927–2018)

Member of the Kentucky Senate from the 11th district
- In office January 1, 1984 – January 1, 1993
- Preceded by: Jim Bunning
- Succeeded by: Dick Roeding

Minority Leader of the Kentucky House of Representatives
- In office January 8, 1980 – January 1, 1984
- Preceded by: William Harold DeMarcus
- Succeeded by: Richard Turner

Member of the Kentucky House of Representatives from the 69th district
- In office January 1, 1968 – January 1, 1984
- Preceded by: Bud Overman
- Succeeded by: Jon Reinhardt
- In office January 1, 1964 – January 1, 1966
- Preceded by: Otto Ingram (redistricting)
- Succeeded by: Bud Overman

Personal details
- Born: May 1, 1927 Cold Spring, Kentucky, United States
- Died: September 2, 2018 (aged 91)
- Party: Republican

Arthur Louis Schmidt (May 1, 1927 - Sep 2, 2018) was an American politician in the state of Kentucky. He served in the Kentucky Senate and in the Kentucky House of Representatives. He was a member of the Republican party. First elected to the house in 1963, he was defeated for reelection in 1965 by Democrat Henry "Bud" Overman. Schmidt ran against Overman again in 1967, defeating him. Schmidt was elected to the senate in 1983 after incumbent Jim Bunning retired to run for governor. He did not seek reelection in 1992.

He died on Sep 2, 2018 at the age of 91.
