= John Weaver (Kentucky politician) =

American politician

Member of the Kentucky Senate from the 24th district
- In office January 1, 1987 – February 25, 1989
- Preceded by: Clyde Middleton
- Succeeded by: Patti Weaver

Personal details
- Born: 1946
- Died: March 2, 1989 (aged 43)
- Party: Democratic

John Weaver (1946 – February 25, 1989) was an American politician from Kentucky who was a member of the Kentucky Senate from 1987 until his death in February 1989. Weaver was elected to the senate 1986, defeating Republican incumbent Clyde Middleton. He died of cancer on February 25, 1989.
