= Patti Weaver =

American politician

Member of the Kentucky Senate from the 24th district
- In office June 6, 1989 – January 1, 1991
- Preceded by: John Weaver
- Succeeded by: Dick Roeding

Personal details
- Born: December 12, 1950 (age 75)
- Party: Democratic

Patti Weaver (born December 12, 1950) is an American politician from Kentucky who was a member of the Kentucky Senate from 1989 to 1991. Weaver was elected in a May 1989 special election following the death of her husband John Weaver. She did not seek reelection in 1990.
