= Bill Schickel =

American politician

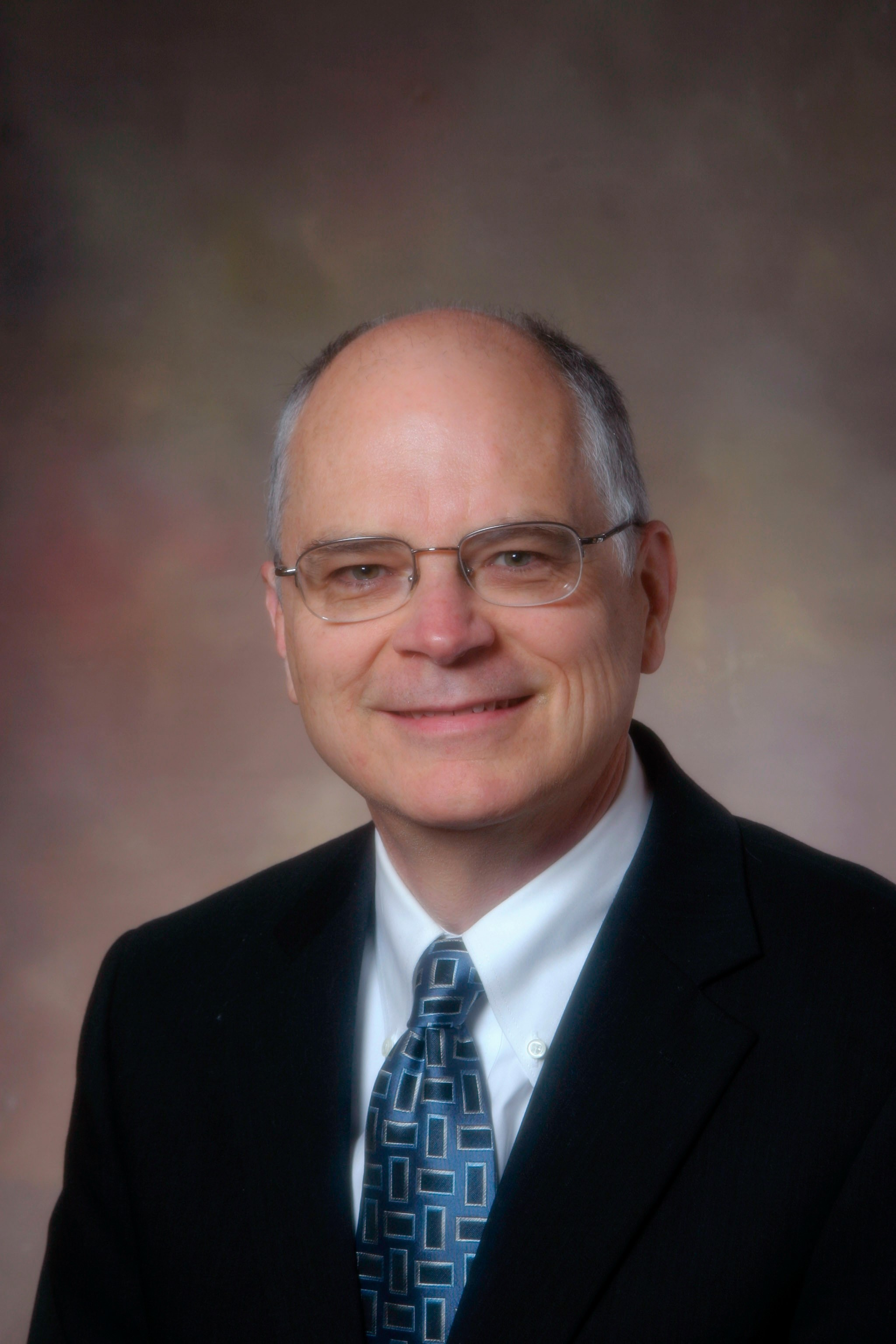

Member of the Iowa House of Representatives from the 13th district
- In office January 13, 2003 – January 11, 2009
- Preceded by: Michael Cormack
- Succeeded by: Sharon S. Steckman

Personal details
- Born: March 24, 1951 (age 75) Loveland, Ohio
- Party: Republican
- Spouse: Candi Schickel
- Children: 3
- Education: University of Cincinnati
- Occupation: Mayor of the City of Mason City, Iowa General Manager, Christian Radio KCMR
- Website: Schickel's former legislative website

William "Bill" Schickel is an Iowa broadcast executive. A former Iowa State Representative, he represented the 13th District for three terms. He was elected to his fifth term as the mayor of Mason City, Iowa on November 2, 2021. He is the former co-chairman of the Republican Party of Iowa. He was chairman of the 2012 Iowa Caucus Review Committee.

During his service in the Iowa House, Schickel was a member of the Appropriations and Economic Growth committees and as the chair of the Ethics Committee and of the Economic Development Appropriations Committee.

He was a news anchor, producer, assignment editor, reporter and account executive for the CBS television affiliate, KIMT-TV, in Mason City, IA. He worked as an editor and reporter for The Globe-Gazette in Mason City and newspapers in Ohio.

He received his BA from the University of Cincinnati.

His wife, Candi, is a Mason City, IA, attorney. The Schickels have three adult daughters.

Schickel announced he would be retiring as mayor in 2025.

== Electoral history ==
*incumbent

Election	Political result	Candidate	Party	Votes	%
Iowa House of Representatives elections, 2002; District 13; Turnout: 9,876	Republican (newly redistricted)	Bill Schickel	Republican	5,168	52.3
Iowa House of Representatives elections, 2002; District 13; Turnout: 9,876	Republican (newly redistricted)	Lionel J. Foster	Democratic	4,673	47.3
Iowa House of Representatives elections, 2004; District 13; Turnout: 14,917	Republican hold	Bill Schickel*	Republican	7,914	53.1
Iowa House of Representatives elections, 2004; District 13; Turnout: 14,917	Republican hold	Bob Cole	Democratic	6,985	46.8
Iowa House of Representatives elections, 2006; District 13; Turnout: 10,644	Republican hold	Bill Schickel*	Republican	5,433	51.0
Iowa House of Representatives elections, 2006; District 13; Turnout: 10,644	Republican hold	Alan Steckman	Democratic	4,616	43.4
Iowa House of Representatives elections, 2006; District 13; Turnout: 10,644	Republican hold	Gary Van Horn	Independent	540	5.1

Iowa House of Representatives
Preceded by Michael Cormack	13th District; 2003 – 2009	Succeeded by Sharon S. Steckman
